= Viktor Krauss =

American bassist

- Born: Viktor Karl Krauss; 1969 (age 55–56); Champaign, Illinois, U.S.
- Genres: Pop, rock, country, bluegrass, jazz
- Occupations: Musician, composer
- Instrument: Bass
- Years active: 1985–present
- Labels: Nonesuch
- Website: viktorkrauss.com

Viktor Krauss is an American musician who plays acoustic and electric bass. He has released solo albums and has worked as a sideman with many musicians, including his sister, singer and fiddler Alison Krauss.

== Music career ==
Krauss was born to Fred and Louise, and raised in Champaign, Illinois. As a boy, he enjoyed listening to soundtracks. He started on piano and trumpet before moving on to playing double bass with local jazz groups in his early teens. In high school, he began composing music and was influenced by rock, soul, and R&B. He attended the University of Illinois at Urbana-Champaign and studied bass, voice, and electronic music. While in college, he formed a band called Difficult Listening.

In 1992, he became a member of the Free Mexican Airforce led by Peter Rowan, a bluegrass guitarist and singer from Boston. After working with Rowan, he joined the band of country singer Lyle Lovett, touring and recording for the next ten years. He played on Forget About It, a solo album by his sister, Alison.

He recorded his album Far from Enough (Nonesuch, 2004) with Alison, dobro player Jerry Douglas, drummer Steve Jordan, and guitarist Bill Frisell. Alison sings a cover version of the song "Big Log" by Robert Plant. Viktor Krauss called his album a soundtrack without a movie. It combines country, bluegrass, and jazz. His second album, II (EMI/Back Porch, 2007), was also compared to a film soundtrack. Shawn Colvin sings a cover version of "Shine On You Crazy Diamond" by Pink Floyd.

Krauss has worked as a session musician on albums by the Cox Family, Beth Nielsen Chapman, Bill Frisell, Jerry Douglas, Kenny Rogers, Dolly Parton, Martin Taylor, Michael McDonald, and Natalie MacMaster. He is also the composer of the indie horror game No Players Online.

From the mid-1990s until 2001, Krauss owned the American Football House, located at 704 W. High St. in Urbana, which was featured on the cover of the first album by emo band American Football.

== Discography ==
- Different Strokes (Fiddle Tunes, 1985)
- Far from Enough (Nonesuch, 2004)
- II (EMI/Back Porch, 2007)

=== As sideman ===
With Alison Krauss

- 1995 Now That I've Found You: A Collection
- 1999 Forget About It
- 2007 A Hundred Miles or More: A Collection

With the Cox Family

- 1994 I Know Who Holds Tomorrow with Alison Krauss
- 1993 Everybody's Reaching Out for Someone
- 1995 Beyond the City
- 1996 Just When We're Thinking It's Over
- 2015 Gone Like the Cotton

With Bill Frisell

- 1997 Nashville (Nonesuch)
- 1998 Gone, Just Like a Train (Nonesuch)
- 1999 Good Dog, Happy Man (Nonesuch)
- 1999 The Sweetest Punch (Decca)
- 2005 East/West (Nonesuch)
- 2007 Floratone (Blue Note)
- 2009 Disfarmer (Nonesuch)

With Jerry Douglas

- 1998 Restless on the Farm
- 2002 Lookout for Hope
- 2005 The Best Kept Secret
- 2012 Traveler

With Lyle Lovett

- 1998 Step Inside This House
- 1999 Live in Texas
- 2000 Dr. T & the Women
- 2003 My Baby Don't Tolerate
- 2003 Smile
- 2007 It's Not Big It's Large
- 2012 Release Me
- 2009 Natural Forces

With Beth Nielsen Chapman

- 2002 Deeper Still
- 2005 Look
- 2007 Prism

With Dolly Parton

- 1994 Heartsongs: Live from Home
- 2005 Those Were the Days

With Jill Sobule

- 1995 Jill Sobule
- 1997 Happy Town

With Natalie MacMaster

- 1999 In My Hands
- 2003 Blueprint

With Ron Block

- 2001 Faraway Land
- 2007 DoorWay

With Peter Rowan

- 1994 Tree on a Hill
- 2006 Crucial Country

With Jason White

- 2001 Shades of Gray
- 2003 Tonight's Top Story

With Carrie Rodriguez

- 2006 Seven Angels on a Bicycle
- 2016 Lola

With Sarah Jarosz

- 2011 Follow Me Down
- 2013 Build Me Up from Bones

With Nicole C. Mullen

- 2000 Nicole C. Mullen
- 2001 Talk About It
- 2008 Gift Tin

With others

- 1995 Departure, Michael Johnson
- 1995 In a Quiet Room, Dan Seals
- 1997 Blue Obsession, Michael McDonald
- 1998 Howlin' at the Moon, Sam Bush
- 1999 Family Tree, Darrell Scott
- 1999 The Crossing, Tim O'Brien
- 1999 The Luxury of Time, David Mead
- 2000 Crazy as Me, Robert Lee Castleman
- 2000 The Beautiful Game, Acoustic Alchemy
- 2002 Down the Old Plank Road, The Chieftains
- 2002 Hey Y'all, Elizabeth Cook
- 2004 Between Here and Gone, Mary Chapin Carpenter
- 2004 Deja Vu All Over Again, John Fogerty
- 2004 Just Like There's Nothin' to It, Steve Forbert
- 2004 Lone Starry Night, John Arthur Martinez
- 2004 One Moment More, Mindy Smith
- 2004 Passing Through, Randy Travis
- 2005 Say What You Feel, Paul Brady
- 2006 3D, Casey Driessen
- 2007 South of Delia, Richard Shindell
- 2007 When at Last, Russ Barenberg
- 2008 In Time, Danny O'Keefe
- 2009 Not Far Now, Richard Shindell
- 2009 The Near Demise of the High Wire Dancer, Antje Duvekot
- 2009 The Scorpion in the Story, Tori Sparks
- 2009 Time to Grow, Lovell Sisters
- 2011 Natural History, JD Souther
- 2011 Anniversary Celebration, Randy Travis
- 2011 City of Refuge, Abigail Washburn
- 2011 Mesabi, Tom Russell
- 2011 Tennessee: The Nashville Sessions, Russell Hitchcock
- 2011 Until Morning/Come Out of the Dark, Tori Sparks
- 2011 Weights & Wings, Matt Wertz
- 2012 All Fall Down, Shawn Colvin
- 2012 Hello Cruel World, Gretchen Peters
- 2001 Nitelife, Martin Taylor
- 2011 Crazy Little Things, Lynda Carter
- 2013 Every Man Should Know, Harry Connick Jr.
- 2013 The Living Room Sessions, B. J. Thomas
- 2012 Amazing Grace, Kenny Rogers
- 2014 Sixty, John Cowan
- 2015 That Lovin' Feeling, Steve Tyrell
- 2016 Turns to Gold, Gabe Dixon
- 2016 Corazones (Omar Rodríguez-López album), Omar Rodríguez-López
