= Degenerate Art Ensemble =

American multi-art performance company

- Choir
- Origin: Seattle, Wa USA
- Founded: 1999 (27 years ago)
- Genre: Performance and Visual Arts
- Director: Joshua Kohl, Haruko Nishimura
- Website: http://degenerateartensemble.com

Degenerate Art Ensemble (often abbreviated DAE) is a Seattle-based multi-art performance company whose work is inspired by punk, comics, cinema, nightmares and fairy tales driven by live music and visceral movement theater and dance. The group was founded and is co-directed by dancer/performer/director Haruko Nishimura and composer/conductor/performer Joshua Kohl. Degenerate Art Ensemble is both a multi-discipline performance company and a band, having performed major dance and live music works, orchestral concerts, rock shows and site-specific street spectacles.

Kohl has described the group's philosophy as follows: "We aim to achieve the intensity of a sacrificial rite to tear away the waking world revealing alternate realities filled with characters that are transformers expressing unimaginable possibilities. We throw audiences into this world, asking them to make sounds en-masse enveloping and activating space. Characters climb over the audience – removing the barriers that normally separate us, creating an environment that arouses our interconnectedness."

The group has performed both music shows and dance/theater performance works in 10 countries of North America and Europe in festivals, theaters, clubs and museums.

== Style and influences ==
Co-founder Nishimura uses her study of Butoh dance and experimental physical theater to create the imagery Degenerate Art Ensemble has come to be synonymous for. As a director and performer, Nishimura has been inspired to explore the relationship between performer's and the patrons; which can often be experienced in attending one of their performances. Nishimura and the team are inspired by the idea of "collision and conflict—with the goal of awakening and transformation". Kohl, whom both composes and conducts the music for the group, utilizes both traditional and newly designed instruments to create the unique sounds for DAE and the Big Band Garage Orchestra. Kohl's approach to the sound of the group is to create music that is "genere-free"- a sound that crosses boundaries and blurs the lines between classical, punk and indie styles.

== Big Band Garage Orchestra (2001–2006) ==
In 2001 Degenerate Art Ensemble formed its first "Big Band Garage Orchestra" with a lineup of drums, guitar, bass, two trumpets, tenor sax, violin, percussion and Nishimura on vocals with Kohl conducting. The group played a punk-jazz style with extreme dynamics ranging from gentle lullabies like Dreams from Wounded Mouth (co-composed by Kohl and Nishimura) to furious jazz/punk/thrash tunes like "Oni Goroshi" (composed by Jherek Bischoff). From 2001 until 2006 the big band toured Europe four times with shows in Germany, Netherlands, France, Italy, Slovenia, Slovakia, Czech Republic and Poland including both music shows and dance theater engagements.

== At the Frye Art Museum ==
The first art exhibition and museum project showcasing Degenerate Art Ensemble was the culmination of a year-long dialogue between Frye Art Museum curator Robin Held and the artists of Degenerate Art Ensemble in 2011. The survey of the group's work filled the entire museum, featuring 14 artists and five large scale works inspired by the ambitious all-sensory productions the group is known for creating: a Weeble Wobble princess that battles ninjas, a surgery ice cream truck, a tuning nest in a listening forest, and the Slug Princess that devours cabbages in a microscopic world.

== Grants and awards ==
- Degenerate Art Ensemble received a Creative Capital Award in 2013
- Joshua Kohl and Haruko Nishimura were chosen to be featured in Seattle's Museum of History and Industry's new Center for Innovation alongside Jeff Bezos and Dale Chihuly in October 2013.
- In 2012 Haruko Nishimura was awarded a Guggenheim Fellowship for choreography.
- The group was awarded the International Music Theater NOW Award by the International Theatre Institute in Germany in for their work Red Shoes in 2012. Kohl and Nishimura presented their work in May 2013 in Jönköping, Sweden as part of the Swedish Biennial for Performing Arts.

== Collaborations ==
Degenerate Art Ensemble has collaborated with many influential and highly respected groups and individuals. DAE has worked with Seattle photographer Steven Miller on multiple projects including Predator's Songstress and Cuckoo Crow to create the elaborate visuals used in performances. In November 2013, Degenerate Art Ensemble collaborated with classical chamber ensemble Kronos Quartet for their 40th anniversary celebration at the Neptune Theatre in Seattle. Over the years Jherek Bischoff has collaborated with Degenerate Art Ensemble on many different compositions and projects including co-producing their 2007 album Cuckoo Crow. In February 2012 Kohl conducted the music of Bischoff at the Lincoln Center in New York with the Wordless Music Orchestra and vocalists David Byrne and Mirah. In April 2012 DAE was commissioned by renowned theater director Robert Wilson and the Watermill Center to create an interpretation of his and Philip Glass's epic work Einstein on the Beach for the Baryshnikov Arts Center in New York. This piece marked the 35th anniversary of the original Einstein On The Beach and was the first time Wilson and Glass have allowed a new interpretation of this work. For their work UNDERBELLY Degenerate Art Ensemble collaborated with cutting edge Olson Kundig Architects. This collaborative multi-media performance was a part of Seattle's Next 50 celebrations in 2012 marking the 50th anniversary of Seattle's World Fair. Olson Kundig has previously worked with the group to create a piece dubbed the Concorde Table for DAE's performance On The Beach in 2012. The group has also worked alongside inkBoat Artistic Director and renowned dancer Shinichi lova-Koga. Koga collaborated on DAE's Rinko as special guest choreographer and dancer in 2000. Composer Violinist Eyvind Kang has also collaborated with Degenerate Art Ensemble on multiple compositions and performances.

== Early years – The Young Composers Collective (1993–1998) ==
Degenerate Art Ensemble grew out of an earlier group led by Kohl and Nishimura called The Young Composers Collective founded in Seattle in 1994, a morphing 17-20 member big band / orchestra that hosted performance artists, modern classical / jazz / rock composers and world-music practitioners performing wildly mixed programs in rock clubs around Seattle and eventually the San Francisco Bay Area. By the late 1990s the collective had shifted towards more visual and dance-centric performances and in 1999 during the creation of their work Scream!Liondogs, which explored the psychology of fascism, renamed the group Degenerate Art Ensemble as it is known today – named after the Degenerate Art Exhibition in Munich in 1937. For the group the name is a "freak flag" of free expression.

== Notable performance works ==
- Boy mother / faceless bloom, 2021–present, a collaboration with musician/performer eddy kwon and sculptor Senga Nengudi commissioned by Colorado College and Contemporary Arts Center (Cincinnati, OH)
- Skeleton Flower, 2019–present, performed at On the Boards (Seattle), International Festival of Contemporary Dance (Mexico City), HC Andersen Festival (Odense, Sweden), to be performed in San Francisco at ODC/Dance in 2024
- Predator's Songstress, 2012–2016, An interdisciplinary performance supported by Creative Capital and the John Simon Guggenheim Foundation performed at Yerba Buena Center for the Arts (San Francisco) and On the Boards (Seattle)
- Red Shoes, 2011, Premiered at Frye Art Museum (Seattle)
- Sonic Tales, 2008–2009, Performed at the Moore Theatre (Seattle) and New Museum (New York)
- Cuckoo Crow, 2005–2007, Performed at REDCAT (Los Angeles)
- Dreams from Wounded Mouth, 2003, Performed at Consolidated Works in Seattle, the Orph Theater in Berlin, Germany and Theatre France Presen (Lubliana, Slovenia)
- Nymph, 2002, Orph Theatre (Berlin, Germany), New Performance Series at On the Boards (Seattle)
- Razor Stitch, 1999–2000, Premiered at Theater Yugen (San Francisco)
- Scream!Liondogs, 1999 Premiered at On the Boards
- Rinko, 1997–2001, On the Boards New Works Festival and ODC Theater (San Francisco)

== Discography ==
DAE has recorded and released nine albums of their music including recordings of works for stage, silent film and music for music's sake.

- 2009, Sonic Tales
- 2006, Cuckoo Crow
- 2005, Bastress (Big Band Garage Orchestra)
- 2003, Look-Away Popeye (The first group recordings of Big Band Garage Orchestra)
- 2001, Rinko
- 1999, Scream! Liondogs
- 1998, Razor Stitch
- 1998, Metropolis (As the Young Composers Collective, a film score to Fritz Lang's 1926 silent film classic Metropolis)
- 1995, The Young Composers Collective (As the Young Composers Collective)

With Eyvind Kang

- The Yelm Sessions (Tzadik, 2009) – on one track as Degenerate Art Orchestra
