= The Narrow Garden =

Live album by Eyvind Kang
- Released: February 14, 2012
- Recorded: October 9, 2007 at Sala Ovidi Montllor, Mercat de les Flors in Barcelona, Spain
- Genre: Jazz, Contemporary classical music
- Length: 38:29
- Label: Ipecac Recordings IPC 132
- Producer: Eyvind Kang and Arco y Flecha

Eyvind Kang chronology
Visible Breath (2012)	The Narrow Garden (2012)	The Face of the Earth (2012)

The Narrow Garden is a live album by violinist/multi-instrumentalist Eyvind Kang which was released in 2012 on Ipecac Recordings.

== Reception ==
Professional ratings
Review scores
Source	Rating
PopMatters	5/10 stars
Allmusic	4/5 stars
Pitchfork Media	7.5/10

The album received generally favorable reviews with Metacritic giving it a score of 73% from 6 reviews.

The PopMatters review by Brice Ezell stated "it’s curious how much of The Narrow Garden doesn’t sound cutting-edge. Much of it sounds quite familiar, actually. ...The Narrow Garden is perhaps best described as a “floating album.” Taken by itself, it has some pretty tracks, as well as some intriguing ones. Yet for the majority of the album I was left wondering what this music was meant to be used for. This means that even if you are taken by the prettiness of the music while you’re listening to it, by the album’s end you’ll be wondering where the music is supposed to go".

The Allmusic review by Thom Jurek was more enthusiastic observing "The Narrow Garden succeeds, far more than either The Yelm Sessions or Athlantis, because there is nothing "narrow" about it. Its more accessible root melodies leave room for a wider array of colors and textures to naturally find their way into its mix. It is his most ambitious and focused work, and combines not only instruments and musical traditions, but cultural sonances and histories as well".

Pitchfork reviewer Brian Howe noted "you don't have to strain too hard to hear Kang's intricate weaving of soft, romantic consonances and harsh, anxious dissonances as an expression of the quicksilver joys and miseries of formalized desire. Taking in lyric poetry, Western choral music, Middle Eastern and South Asian modes, and "ashugh" singing (a popular folk tradition heavily associated with the Caucasus), The Narrow Garden features some of the most sunny and flowering music that Kang has created, seamlessly joined with a couple of sinister threnodies."

== Track listing ==
All compositions by Eyvind Kang with lyrics by Guilhem IX (track 2) and Sulpicia (tracks 6 & 7)

1. "Forest Sama'l" - 5:28
2. "Pure Nothing" - 4:59
3. "Usnea" - 7:23
4. "Mineralia" - 4:29
5. "The Narrow Garden" - 5:25
6. "Nobis Natalis" - 1:14
7. "Invisus Natalis" - 9:31

== Personnel ==
- Eyvind Kang - composer, director
- Daphna Mor - flute
- Bassam Saba - flute, ney
- Josiah Boothby - French horn
- Taina Karr - oboe
- Michael Ibrahim - bassoon
- David Murgadas - guitar
- Shelly Burgon - harp
- Trevor Dunn - bass
- April Centrone, Ferran Armengol - percussion
- Jenny Scheinman, Roberto Riggio, Aleix Puig, Ariadna Padró, Gabriel Coll, Guillem Calvo, Oriol Sanã, Daniel Cuberco, Emilia Grajales, Gerard Purti, Lluna Aragón, Maria Sanz - violin
- Laia Besalduch, Marc Terrida, Miquel Córdoba, Stephanie Griffin - viola
- Amat Santacana, Eva Gumà, Marika Hughes, Oleguer Aymami - cello
- Christopher Williams, Felipe Contreras - contrabass
- Jessika Kenney - vocals
