= Fit as a Fiddle =

Fit as a Fiddle may refer to:

- "Fit as a Fiddle" (song) 1932
- Fit as a Fiddle (album) by Natalie MacMaster 1997
- Fit as a Fiddle, album by Danish jazz violinist Svend Asmussen 1999
- Fit as a Fiddle, 1952 keep-fit documentary with Joe Robinson (actor)
- Fit as a Fiddle, 1980s sketch in the sketch series Hee Haw with Gailard Sartain
