= No Boundaries (Natalie MacMaster album) =

Studio album by Natalie MacMaster
- Released: May 1, 1996
- Genre: Celtic
- Length: 53:30
- Label: Rounder

Natalie MacMaster chronology
A Compilation	No Boundaries	My Roots Are Showing

Professional ratings
Review scores
Source	Rating
Allmusic	4/5 stars

No Boundaries, an album by Natalie MacMaster, was released in 1996 on the Rounder Records label.

== Track listing ==
1. "The Honeysuckle Set" – 5:42
2. "My Friend Buddy" – 4:07
3. "Fiddle & Bow" (with Bruce Guthro) – 5:10
4. "Reel Beatrice" – 3:30
5. "Paddy Leblanc's Set" – 5:54
6. "Silverwells" – 3:40
7. "The Drunken Piper" – 4:07
8. "Catharsis" – 2:30
9. "Where's Howie?" – 3:46
10. "Bill Crawford's Set" – 3:28
11. "The Beaumont Rag" – 3:31
12. "The Autograph" – 5:58
13. "Rev. Archie Beaton" – 2:27
