= In My Hands =

Studio album by Natalie MacMaster
- Released: September 14, 1999
- Genre: Celtic
- Length: 61:51
- Label: Rounder
- Producer: Gordie Sampson

Natalie MacMaster chronology
| A Compilation (1998) | In My Hands (1999) | My Roots Are Showing (2000) |

Professional ratings
Review scores
| Source | Rating |
|---|---|
| AllMusic | 3/5 stars |

In My Hands is an album by Natalie MacMaster. It was released in 1999 on Rounder Records. The album won the 2000 Juno Award for Instrumental Album of the Year.

== Critical reception ==
The Washington Post wrote that "Alison Krauss' satiny soprano perfectly matches MacMaster's fiddle on 'Get Me Through December'."

== Track listing ==
1. "In My Hands" - 4:23
2. "Welcome to the Trossachs" - 7:17
3. "Gramma" - 2:35
4. "Blue Bonnets Over the Border" - 4:24
5. "New York Jig" - 4:06
6. "Flamenco Fling" - 3:44
7. "Space Ceilidh" - 3:41
8. "Olympic Reel" - 3:19
9. "Father MacLeod's Jig" - 2:55
10. "Get Me Through December" - 6:29
11. "The Farewell" - 5:25
12. "Moxham Castle" - 4:17
13. "Mom's Jig" - 5:15
14. "Flora MacDonald" - 3:48

== Personnel ==
- Scott Alexander - bass
- Art Avalos - percussion, handclaps
- Margaret Ann (Cameron) Beaton - spoken introduction
- Marie Berard - violin
- James Blennerhasset - bass
- Kevin Breit - electric guitar
- Joel Chiasson - piano
- Charlie Cooley - drums
- Jesse Cook - guitar
- Al Cross - drums
- Aaron Davis - piano
- David Direnzo - percussion
- Bruce Dixon - bass
- Phil Dwyer - trombone, saxophone
- Ray Fean - drum
- Fujiko Imajishi - violin
- John Barlow Jarvis - piano
- Denis Keldie - organ
- Laoise Kelly - harp
- Alison Krauss - vocals on track 10
- Viktor Krauss - bass
- Howie MacDonald - piano
- David MacIsaac - guitar
- Brent Mason - guitar
- Mark O'Connor - fiddle
- Douglas Perry - viola
- Terry Promane - trumpet
- Matt Rollins - piano
- Gordie Sampson - keyboards, guitar, bass guitar, percussion
- Chase Sanborn - trumpet
- Mary Shannon - mandolin
- Sharon Shannon - accordion
- Harry Stinson - drums
- Rick Tate - trumpet
- Paul Widner - cello
- Glenn Worf - bass
- Natalie MacMaster - vocals, acoustic and electric fiddle
