= Jennifer Walshe =

Irish composer (born 1974)

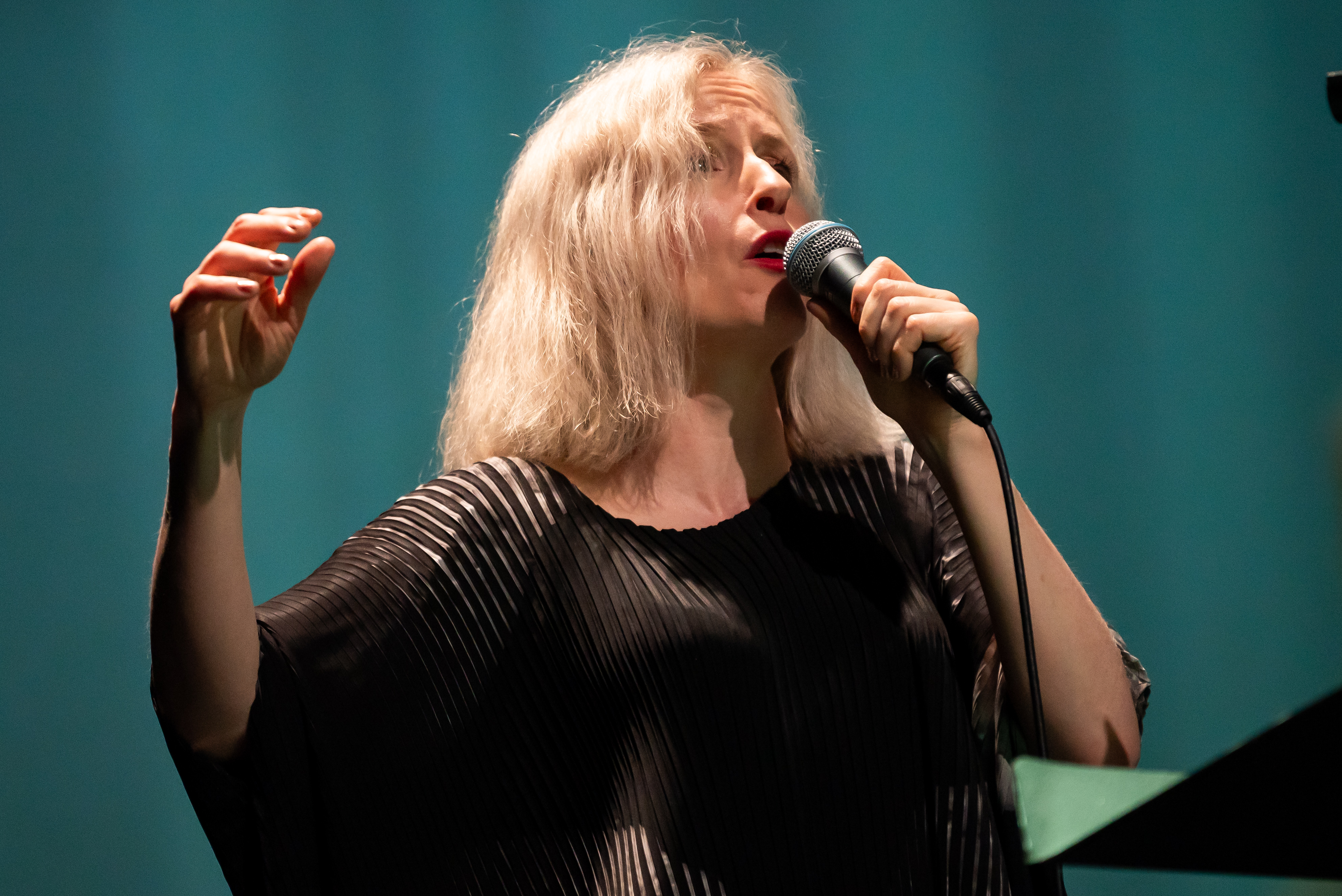
Jennifer Walshe on stage in 2024

Jennifer Walshe (born 1 June 1974) is an Irish composer, vocalist and artist.

== Biography ==
Jennifer Walshe was born in Dublin, Ireland, in 1974. She studied composition with John Maxwell Geddes at the Royal Scottish Academy of Music and Drama, Kevin Volans in Dublin and graduated from Northwestern University (Evanston, IL) with a doctoral degree in composition in June 2002. Her chief teachers at Northwestern were Amnon Wolman and Michael Pisaro. In 2003–04 Walshe was a fellow of Akademie Schloss Solitude, Stuttgart; during 2004–05 she lived in Berlin as a guest of the DAAD Berliner Künstlerprogramm. From 2006 to 2008 she was the composer-in-residence in South Dublin County for In Context 3. Walshe received a 2007 Foundation for Contemporary Arts Grants to Artists Award. In 2008 she was awarded the Praetorius Music Prize for Composition by the Niedersächsisches Ministerium für Wissenschaft und Kultur. In 2014 she was invited as guest curator for the Danish music and sound art festival SPOR festival.

Walshe's work has been performed all over the world by ensembles such as Alter Ego, ensemble recherche, Ensemble Resonanz, Apartment House, ensemble Intégrales, Neue Vocalsolisten Stuttgart, Stuttgarter Kammerorchester, Schlagquartett Köln, Crash Ensemble, Con Tempo Quartet, Trio Scordatura, Ensemble Ascolta, Champ d'Action, ensemble laboratorium, ensemble surplus, the Rilke Ensemble, the Irish Chamber Orchestra, the Irish Youth Wind Ensemble, Bozzini Quartet, Callino Quartet, Ensemble 2000, Concorde, Kaleidoscop, Black Hair, Continuum, Musica Nova Consort, ensemble chronophonie, the Scottish Chamber Orchestra Wind Quintet, the Hebrides Ensemble, Psappha, and Q-02 among others.

She has received commissions from organisations including Raidió Teilifís Éireann (RTÉ), Westdeutscher Rundfunk (WDR), Südwest Rundfunk (SWR), the Internationale Ferienkurse für Neue Musik, Darmstadt, MaerzMusik, Musik der Jahrhundert, the Huddersfield Contemporary Music Festival, Dresdener Tage der zeitgenössischen Musik, Wien Modern, the Dresden Semperoper, Center for Art and Media Karlsruhe, the Irish Chamber Orchestra, Crash Ensemble, the Project Arts Centre and the National Concert Hall, Ireland, as well as commission awards from the New Music Scheme of the Arts Council of Ireland and the Scottish Arts Council.

In 2003–04 Walshe was composer-in-residence at the National Sculpture Factory, Cork. In 2000 she won the Kranichsteiner Musikpreis at the Internationale Ferienkurse für Neue Musik in Darmstadt, and received first prize in the SCI/ASCAP 2002 Commission Competition. In July 2002 she returned to Darmstadt to lecture in composition at the Internationale Ferienkurse für Neue Musik. Her work was shortlisted for the 2002 and 2003 Gaudeamus Foundation composition prizes.

In addition to her activities as a composer, Walshe frequently performs as a vocalist, specialising in extended techniques. Many of her recent compositions were commissioned for her voice in conjunction with other instruments, and her works have been performed by her and others at festivals such as RTÉ Living Music (Dublin), Båstad Kammarmusik Festival (Sweden), Ultraschall (Berlin), Ars Musica (Brussels), Steirischer Herbst, Wien Modern, Wittener Tage für neue Kammermusik, Donaueschinger Musiktage, the Huddersfield Contemporary Music Festival, Late Music Festival (York), Hamburger Klangwerktage, Gaida (Lithuania), BMIC Cutting Edge, Composer's Choice (Dublin), SoundField (Chicago) the Internationale Ferienkurse für Neue Musik Darmstadt, Stockholm New Music, BELEF (Belgrade), Traiettorie (Parma), Lucerne Festival (Switzerland), SPOR (Denmark), Frau musica nova (Cologne), Performa (New York), Electric Eclectics (Canada), Reihe 0 (Austria), Ergodos (Dublin), Music at the Anthology (New York) and the 17th edition of the Sonic Acts Festival: The Noise of Being (Amsterdam). Walshe is also active as an improviser, performing regularly with musicians in Europe and the US.

Recent projects of note include Grúpat, a two-year project in which Walshe assumed nine different alter egos – all members of art collective Grúpat – and created compositions, installations, graphic scores, films, photography, sculptures and fashion under these alter egos. Pieces by Grúpat members have been performed and exhibited all over the world, most notably at the Dublin Electronic Arts Festival; Kilkenny Arts Festival; the Museum of Arts & Design, New York; the Contemporary Arts Museum Houston; New Langton Arts, San Francisco; Ultrasound Festival, Tel Aviv and Festival Rümlingen, Switzerland. In February 2009 Grúpat were the feature of a retrospective at the Project Arts Centre, Dublin, which coincided with the launch of the book Grúpat by Project Press and the release of two CDs featuring Walshe's music written under her Grúpat alter egos. Walshe is part of the first edition of the Monheim Triennale.

Since 2016, Walshe has been Professor at the State University of Music and Performing Arts Stuttgart. She has taught, held lectures, and performed workshops within the framework of conferences and festivals, and has acted as a mentor at the Forecast program in Berlin. In 2019, The Guardian ranked XXX_LIVE_NUDE_GIRLS!!! (2003) the 25th greatest work of art music since 2000, with Kate Molleson stating that "she yanks off the plastic veneer of commercial culture by parodying then systematically dismembering the archetypes."

As of 2021, Walshe is Professor of Composition at the University of Oxford. Walshe's opera MARS, with a libretto by Mark O'Connell, premiered at the Galway International Arts Festival in July 2025. In 2026, Walshe and Irish National Opera won the Opera category at the Sky Arts Awards for the work.

== Works ==
- A Girl's Book of Song (2016) for girls' choir
- EVERYTHING IS IMPORTANT (2016) for voice, string quartet and film (with sound)
- AN GLÉACHT (2015) for 1+ performers
- 1984 IT'S O.K. (2015) for violin, cello and percussion
- VOLUNTEER CHORUS (2015) for 5 or more performers
- 13 Vices (2015) for string trio, three improvisers and voice; written in collaboration with Irvine
- Historical Documents of the Irish Avant-Garde (2015)
- Zusammen ii (2015) for seven performers
- The Chimes Hours (2014) for ensemble, four soloists, quartet of improvisers, multiple installations and film; written in collaboration with Lee Patterson and Peter Meanwell
- Zusammen i (2014) for ten performers, from The Chimes Hours
- THE TOTAL MOUNTAIN (2014) for voice and film (with sound)
- THE SIGNING (2014) shadow opera for voice, violin, shadow puppets and film; written in collaboration with Tony Conrad
- TRAINING IS THE OPPOSITE (2014) chamber opera for soprano, string quartet, electronics and film
- THEY LEFT HIM IN THE OCEAN (2014) for string quartet and DVD
- DORDÁN (2013) for clarinet, trombone, guitar, cello, double bass and DVD
- WASH ME WHITER THAN SNOW (2013) for violin, cello and DVD
- DURATION & ITS SIMPLE MODES (2013) for solo voice and 16 voice choir
- LANGUAGE RUINS EVERYTHING (2013) for counter-tenor, piano, volunteer chorus and DVD
- EVERYTHING YOU OWN HAS BEEN TAKEN TO A DEPOT SOMEWHERE (2013) for three performers
- Historical Documents of the Irish Avant-garde Vol. 1: Dada for voice and electronics (2012)
- The White Noisery (2012) for 16 voices (with objects) and CD
- SILENTLY & VERY FAST (2012) for any number of performers
- Look, Stranger on this Island (2012) for voice and electronics
- Die Taktik (2012) opera for 4 voices, chorus, 3 dancers, trombone, percussion, piano, violin, viola, cello and electronics
- Atlanta 2089 (2011) for voice, trumpet, trombone, 2 percussion, piano, guitar, cello and DVD
- METTA (2011) for flute, clarinet, trombone, tuba, piano, percussion, violin, cello and voice
- Flor Hartigan's to Damhnait Brixius (2011) for voice and ensemble
- A Folk Song Collection (2011) for three voices
- ALL THE MANY PEOPLES (2011) for solo voice, DVD and electronics
- The Soft Menagerie (2011) for three voices
- WATCHED OVER LOVINGLY BY SILENT MACHINES (2011) for five voices (with objects) and DVD
- Julian & Kanye (2011) for three voices
- HYGIENE (2011) for violin, viola or cello, 8 performers and DVD
- lashings of the old ultra-v (2010) for four male voices and electronics
- The Church of Frequency & Protein (2010) for voice, trumpet, trombone, 2 percussion, piano, guitar, cello and DVD
- Stuttgart 2089 (2010) for voice, trumpet, trombone, 2 percussion, piano, guitar, cello and DVD
- Freya Birren's The Faerie Queene (2010) for voice, guitar and DVD
- Wilhelm vs. Bruce (Fists of Fury!) (2010) for 16-channel sound
- Hotel Chelsea (2010) for organ and symphony orchestra
- The Geometry (2009) opera for 4 actors, voice, clarinet, guitar, live electronics
- Performat #2 (2009) for voice and electronics
- Freya Birren's Libris Solar (2009) for voice and orchestra
- MARLOWE S. (2009) for string quartet, tape recorder and CD
- Thelma Mansfield (2008) for flute, percussion and piano with DVD
- Violetta Mahon's Dream Diaries, 1988–2008 (2008) for trumpet, trombone, cello, two percussionists, piano, cello and CD
- PADDY REILLY RUNS WITH THE DEVIL (2008) for five vocalists with mp3 players
- he was she was (2008) for four performers and CD
- The Dowager Marchylove's The Wasistas of Thereswhere (2008) for voice, tin whistle, kazoo and live electronics
- becher (2008) for solo piano
- Turf Boon's Community Choir Drawing 8291: lámh (2008) for voice, chamber ensemble and laptop
- Detleva Verens' Scintillia (2008) for solo voice, with film canister and comb
- Flor Hartigan's Conturador (2008) for solo or ensemble
- i: same person/ii: not the same person (2007) for solo voice (with psaltery), instruments and laptop, or for solo voice (with psalter) and electronics
- Flor Hartigan's whives: trio and solo (2007)
- My Extensive Relationship with Mr. Stephen Patrick M. (2007) for oboe, clarinet, accordion, percussion, voice, cello and CD
- "The Blue Room" (2007) for piano, from FASTER, FASTER, PUSSYCAT – KILL KILL KILL!
- Ukeoirn O'Connor's Three Songs (2007) for voice and ukulele
- Physics for the Girl in the Street (2007) for voice and percussion quartet
- elephant (2006) for harp and guns
- passenger (2006) for string orchestra
- 22’30” (2006) for a singer for voice and laptop
- dub/ber/vie (2006) for voice, 4-channel sound projection and live electronics
- The Procedure for Smoothing Air (2005) for trombone, voice, piano, cello and CD
- Motel Abandon (2005) for voice, actor, cello, DVD and multiple CDs
- The Book of Tamworth (2005) for any forces
- (your name here) (2005) for voice, violin and video
- G.L.O.R.I.- (2005) for solo voice
- meanwhile, back at the ranch... (2005) for seven performers and image controller
- #214: the son and heir (2004) for voice, clarinet and cello
- nature data (2004) for voice and dictaphones
- A Fyne Prospeckte: Jim and Christine Sheenan's Chateau Tamworth (2004) for four performers
- x=dative case (2004) for French horn
- set phasers on KILL! (2004) for three female voices and two male voices, trombone, two percussionists, prepared piano, viola, cello, video, slides and CD
- Cooking with Stone (2004) open score
- #132: the leather runs smooth on the passenger seat (2004) for voice, cello and viola/percussion
- #112: dear hero imprison'd (2004) for two voices and cello
- THIS IS WHY PEOPLE O.D. ON PILLS /AND JUMP FROM THE GOLDEN GATE BRIDGE (2004) for solo or ensemble
- a sensitive number for the laydeez (2004) for viola, saxophone, percussion, piano and video
- XXX_LIVE_NUDE_GIRLS!!! (2003) for two female vocalists, clarinet, trombone, accordion, cello, two puppeteers, two camera operators and CD
- minard/nithsdale (2003) for string quartet and two boomboxes
- been in a room and a room and a room and a room (2002) for twelve voices
- theme from (2002) for violin and piano with walkie-talkies
- here we are now (2002) for voice, cello, trombone and percussion
- unbreakable line. hinged waist. (2002) for flute, oboe, clarinet, percussion, piano, violin, viola and cello
- movement v: presto giocose (2002) for chamber orchestra
- ná déan NÍL CEAD (2001) for voice and string ensemble
- dirty white fields (2001) for voice and violin
- NOW WASH YOUR HANDS (2001) for voice, cello and two djs
- small small big (2001) for wind ensemble
- moving in/love song/city front garden with old men (2001) for tenor voice and piano
- like glass in a mirror on a windowpane (2000) for wind quintet
- as mo cheann (2000) for voice and violin
