= Big Sur (album) =

Studio album by Bill Frisell
- Released: June 18, 2013
- Recorded: 2013
- Studio: Fantasy Studios, Berkeley, CA
- Genre: Jazz
- Length: 64:25
- Label: OKeh 88883717382
- Producer: Lee Townsend

Bill Frisell chronology
Silent Comedy (2013)	Big Sur (2013)	Guitar in the Space Age! (2014)

Big Sur is an album by Bill Frisell which was released on the OKeh label in 2013.

== Reception ==
Professional ratings
Aggregate scores
Source	Rating
Metacritic	77/100
Review scores
Source	Rating
AllMusic	4/5 stars

Response was positive, with Metacritic assigning the album an aggregate score of 77 out of 100 based on 5 critical reviews, indicating "Generally favorable reviews". In his review for AllMusic, Thom Jurek notes that, "this hour-long work is at its absolute best when taken as a whole. On Big Sur, Frisell delivers an inspired musical portrayal of the land, sky, sea, and wildlife of the region with majesty, humor, and true sophistication".

== Track listing ==
All compositions by Bill Frisell.

1. "The Music of Glen Deven Ranch" – 3:46
2. "Sing Together Like a Family" – 4:22
3. "A Good Spot" – 0:53
4. "Going to California" – 3:17
5. "The Big One" – 2:44
6. "Somewhere" – 1:32
7. "Gather Good Things" – 5:31
8. "Cry Alone" – 3:18
9. "The Animals" – 1:39
10. "Highway 1" – 4:51
11. "A Beautiful View" – 4:05
12. "Hawks" – 4:40
13. "We All Love Neil Young" – 1:39
14. "Big Sur" – 3:05
15. "On the Lookout" – 2:01
16. "Shacked Up" – 4:11
17. "Walking Stick (For Jim Cox)" – 4:10
18. "Song for Lana Weeks" – 4:14
19. "Far Away" – 4:36

== Personnel ==
- Bill Frisell – guitar
- Jenny Scheinman – violin
- Eyvind Kang – viola
- Hank Roberts – cello
- Rudy Royston – drums
