= Blueprint (Natalie MacMaster album) =

Studio album by Natalie MacMaster
- Released: September 9, 2003
- Genre: Celtic
- Length: 56:59
- Label: Rounder
- Producer: Darol Anger

Natalie MacMaster chronology
Live (2002)	Blueprint (2003)

Professional ratings
Review scores
Source	Rating
Allmusic	4/5 stars

Blueprint is an album by Natalie MacMaster, released in 2003 on the Rounder Records label.

== Track listing ==
1. "A Blast" – 5:27
  - "Bishop Faber MacDonald's Strathspey"
  - "Frank & Julie Leahy's Strathspey"
  - "Maggie Cameron's Stratspey"
  - "Bill Burnett's Reel"
  - "Mrs. MacPherson of Invernan"
2. "Appropriate Dipstick" – 3:31
3. "Jig Party" – 4:02
  - Traditional Jig
  - "The Butlers of Glen Avenue"
  - "Tee Tie Tum Tittle Tee"
  - "Annette's Chatter"
4. "Touch of the Master's Hand" – 3:14
5. "Eternal Friendship" – 4:27
6. "Gravel Shore" – 4:45
  - "Gravel Shore"
  - "Reel for Carl"
  - "The Street Player"
7. "Devil and the Dirk" – 4:44
  - "The Carignan Clog"
  - "The Devil and the Dirk"
  - "Lord Gordon's Reel"
  - "Golden Lochs"
8. "The Ewe With the Crooked Horn" – 5:37
  - "The Ewie wi' the Crookit Horn"
  - "The Ashplant"
9. "Johsefin's Waltz" – 3:35
10. "Bela's Tune" – 4:57
11. "The Silver Spear" – 4:16
  - "The Silver Spear"
  - "The Glen Road to Carrick"
  - "Lad O'Beirne's Reel"
12. "Minnie & Alex's Reel" – 2:35
13. "My Love, Cape Breton and Me" – 5:49
  - "My Love, Cape Breton and Me"
  - "Prayer for Peace Waltz"

== Personnel ==
- Philip Aaberg - piano
- Darol Anger - octave violin, arranger
- Larry Atamanuik - drums
- Sam Bacco - percussion
- Alison Brown - banjo
- John R. Burr - synthesizer
- Sam Bush - mandolin
- John Chiasson - bass
- John Cowan - vocals
- Tracey Dares - piano
- Brad Davidge - guitar
- Jerry Douglas - resonator guitar
- Béla Fleck - banjo
- Matt Flinner - mandolin
- George Hebert - guitar
- Byron House - bass
- Viktor Krauss - bass
- Matt MacIsaac - bagpipes, small pipes, electric pipes, whistle
- Mike Marshall - mandolin
- Edgar Meyer - bass, arranger
- Todd Phillips - bass
- Bob Quinn - piano
- Kate Quinn - vocals
- Gordie Sampson - guitar
- Bryan Sutton - guitar
- Victor Wooten - bass
