= Floratone =

Studio album by Bill Frisell, Matt Chamberlain, Lee Townsend, Tucker Martine
- Released: August 14, 2007
- Recorded: 2007
- Studio: Flora, Portland, OR, Studio Litho, Seattle, WA and Avast! Recording Co., Seattle WA
- Genre: Jazz
- Length: 48:19
- Label: Blue Note 0946 3 93879
- Producer: Lee Townsend, Tucker Martine

Bill Frisell chronology
Bill Frisell, Ron Carter, Paul Motian (2006)	Floratone (2007)	History, Mystery (2008)

Floratone is the first album by the collective Floratone, which comprises guitarist Bill Frisell, drummer Matt Chamberlain along with producers Lee Townsend and Tucker Martine which was released on the Blue Note label in 2007.

== Reception ==
Professional ratings
Review scores
Source	Rating
AllMusic	4/5 stars
All About Jazz	4.5/5 stars

In his review for AllMusic, Sean Westergaard notes that, "It's great to hear Frisell messing with the delays again in a big way and the pure sonics of Floratone are as much of a treat as the playing. It's pleasant enough for background music, but careful listening will be rewarded. Try this one with headphones". On All About Jazz, John Kelman said "The music on Floratone is largely based around Chamberlain's behind-the-beat grooves and Frisell's left-of-center blues-drenched chords and phrases. While changes don't figure much, Frisell's inherently skewed lyricism creates instantly memorable melodies. As is often the case with Frisell, it's not about soloing per se; rather it's about collective interpretation—and Frisell's ability to work simple ideas, exploring all possible nuances". The BBC Music review by Matt Trustram stated "The lack of an instrumentalist leader is audible; don’t expect virtuosic riffing or soloing from Frisell here. Sure, his presence is felt, with hallmark reverb and tremolo effects as well as his innate blues feel".

== Track listing ==
All compositions by Bill Frisell, Matt Chamberlain, Lee Townsend and Tucker Martine

1. "Floratone" – 5:31
2. "The Wanderer" – 6:39
3. "Mississippi Rising" – 4:26
4. "The Passenger" – 6:56
5. "Swamped" – 3:34
6. "Monsoon" – 4:59
7. "Louisiana Lowboat" – 4:01
8. "The Future" – 4:25
9. "Take a Look" – 2:02
10. "Frontiers" – 4:05
11. "Threadbare" – 1:41

== Personnel ==
- Bill Frisell – electric guitar, acoustic guitar, loops, vocals
- Matt Chamberlain – drums, percussion, loops
- Lee Townsend, Tucker Martine – production
- Viktor Krauss – electric bass, acoustic bass
- Ron Miles – cornet (tracks 1–3, 7 & 8)
- Eyvind Kang – viola (tracks 1–3, 7 & 8)
