= East/West (album) =

Live album by Bill Frisell
- Released: 2005
- Recorded: May 8–11, 2003 and December 9–12, 2003
- Studio: Yoshi's, Oakland, California; Village Vanguard, NYC
- Genre: Jazz fusion, folk-jazz, Americana
- Length: 115:11
- Label: Elektra Nonesuch
- Producer: Lee Townsend

Bill Frisell chronology
Richter 858 (2005)	East/West (2005)	Bill Frisell, Ron Carter, Paul Motian (2006)

East/West is the 18th album, first double CD and first live album by Bill Frisell to be released on the Elektra Nonesuch label. Released in 2005, it features performances by Frisell, Viktor Krauss and Kenny Wollesen which were recorded at Yoshi's in Oakland, California on May 8–11, 2003 (CD 1 – West) and performances by Frisell with Tony Scherr and Kenny Wollesen recorded on December 9–12, 2003 at the Village Vanguard in New York City (CD2 – East). An additional second set of material from both the "East" and "West" venues was made available as a downloadable album Further East/Further West.

== Reception ==
The AllMusic review by Sean Westergaard awarded the album four stars, stating, "The group improvisations also add a bit of spark. Folks who discovered Frisell in the late '90s with albums like Nashville are going to love this set".

Professional ratings
Review scores
Source	Rating
Allmusic	4/5 stars
The Penguin Guide to Jazz Recordings	3/4 stars

== Track listing ==
All compositions by Bill Frisell except as indicated.

Disc One – West

1. "I Heard It Through the Grapevine" (Strong, Whitfield) – 8:00
2. "Blues for Los Angeles" – 11:09
3. Shenandoah" (Traditional) – 12:05
4. "Boubacar" – 6:22
5. "Pipe Down" – 10:50
6. "A Hard Rain's A-Gonna Fall" (Dylan) – 11:49

Disc Two – East

1. "My Man's Gone Now" (Gershwin, Gershwin, Heyward) – 3:48
2. "The Days of Wine and Roses" (Mancini, Mercer) – 9:20
3. "You Can Run" (Frisell, Scherr, Wollesen) – 0:51
4. "Ron Carter" – 13:59
5. "Interlude" (Frisell, Scherr, Wollesen) – 1:39
6. "Goodnight Irene" (Ledbetter, Lomax) – 8:57
7. "The Vanguard" (Frisell, Scherr, Wollesen) – 4:44
8. "People" (Merrill, Styne) – 4:29
9. "Crazy" (Nelson) – 4:31
10. "Tennessee Flat Top Box" (Cash) – 2:28

== Personnel ==
- Bill Frisell – guitars and electronic effects
- Kenny Wollesen – drums
- Viktor Krauss – bass (Disc 1 – West)
- Tony Scherr – bass, acoustic guitar (Disc 2 – East)
