= Virginal Co Ordinates =

Studio album by Eyvind Kang
- Released: 2003
- Genre: Avant-garde jazz
- Label: I Dischi Di Angelica (CD) (IDA 016)

Eyvind Kang chronology
napoli 23 (2002)	Virginal Co Ordinates (2003)	Orchestra Dim Bridges (2004)

Virginal Co Ordinates is an album by Eyvind Kang, released in 2003 by I Dischi Di Angelica and reissued in 2004 by Ipecac Recordings.

== Track listing ==
All tracks written by Eyvind Kang.

1. "Go in a Good Way to a Better Place" – 4:10
2. "I Am the Dead" – 5:08
3. "Doorway to the Sun" – 19:23
4. "Occultum Lapidem" – 4:38
5. "Harbour of the NADE" – 2:50
6. "Taksim" – 2:38
7. "Sidi Bou Said" – 5:41
8. "Virginal Co-Ordinates" – 10:39
9. "Innocent Eye, Crystal See" – 12:58
10. "Marriage of Days" – 4:33
