= Live (Natalie MacMaster album) =

Live album by Natalie MacMaster
- Released: June 4, 2002
- Genre: Celtic
- Length: 105:52
- Label: Rounder

Natalie MacMaster chronology
My Roots Are Showing (2000)	Live (2002)	Blueprint (2003)

Professional ratings
Review scores
Source	Rating
AllMusic	4.5/5 stars

Live is a double album by Natalie MacMaster, released in 2002 on the Rounder Records label.

== Track listing ==
Disc one – In Concert (recorded at the Living Arts Center, Mississauga, Ontario)

1. "Farewell" – 7:46
2. "Fairy Dance" – 5:05
3. "Torna a Surriento" – 5:31
4. "Bog a Lochan Steps" – 3:06
5. "Blue Bonnets" – 4:36
6. "Welcome to Trossachs" – 7:08
7. "David's Jig" – 4:28
8. "Tullochgorum" – 9:56
9. "The A Medley" – 9:55
10. "The Encore" – 6:22

Disc two – Glencoe Dance (recorded at the Glencoe Mills Hall, Glencoe Mills, Cape Breton)

1. "Natalie's Intro" – 0:33
2. "Opening Figure" – 3:56
3. "Second Figure" – 4:44
4. "Lively Steps" – 8:26
5. "Jerry Tunes" – 3:11
6. "Pipe Jigs" – 3:49
7. "Grand Promenade" – 7:44
8. "Stepdancer's Queue" – 7:07
9. "...One Good Holler" – 2:29
