= Bill Frisell, Ron Carter, Paul Motian =

Studio album by Bill Frisell
- Released: 2006
- Recorded: February 14–15, 2005
- Studio: Avatar Studios, New York, NY
- Genre: Post-bop, folk jazz, Americana
- Length: 63:21
- Label: Elektra Nonesuch
- Producer: Lee Townsend

Bill Frisell chronology
East/West (2005)	Bill Frisell, Ron Carter, Paul Motian (2006)	Floratone (2007)

Bill Frisell, Ron Carter, Paul Motian is the 19th album by Bill Frisell, released on the Elektra Nonesuch label.

== Background ==
It was released in 2006 and features performances by Frisell, Ron Carter and Paul Motian recorded on February 14–15, 2005.

An EP with four additional tracks was released on iTunes. It has since become available on Bill Frisell's official website as a download.

The album cover features a photography by Ralph Gibson, who also provided portraits of the musicians for the album's booklet and the EP.

== Reception ==
The AllMusic review by Thom Jurek awarded the album 3½ stars, stating, "This is a solid and unexpected surprise from a brilliantly conceived collaboration.".

Professional ratings
Review scores
Source	Rating
AllMusic	3.5/5 stars
The Penguin Guide to Jazz Recordings	3.5/4 stars

== Track listing ==
1. "Eighty-One" (Miles Davis, Ron Carter) – 6:20
2. "You Are My Sunshine" (Jimmie Davis) – 5:56
3. "Worse and Worse" (Bill Frisell) – 5:16
4. "Raise Four" (Thelonious Monk) – 5:15
5. "Pretty Polly" (Traditional) – 6:56
6. "On the Street Where You Live" (Frederick Loewe) – 9:25
7. "Monroe" (Frisell) – 6:05
8. "Introduction" (Paul Motian) – 4:36
9. "Misterioso" (Monk) – 6:36
10. "I'm So Lonesome I Could Cry" (Hank Williams) – 7:56

=== Additional tracks on "A Frisell EP" ===
1. "Lazy" – 3:23
2. "Mandeville" (Paul Motian) – 3:48
3. "Little Waltz" (Ron Carter) – 6:55
4. "Mood" – 4:44

== Personnel ==
- Bill Frisell – guitars
- Paul Motian – drums
- Ron Carter – bass
