= Gone, Just Like a Train =

Studio album by Bill Frisell
- Released: January 6, 1998
- Recorded: 1997
- Studio: O'Henry Sound (Burbank, California)
- Genre: Jazz fusion, Americana
- Length: 68:50
- Label: Elektra Nonesuch
- Producer: Lee Townsend

Bill Frisell chronology
Nashville (1997)	Gone, Just Like a Train (1998)	Good Dog, Happy Man (1999)

Gone, Just Like a Train is the tenth album by Bill Frisell to be released on the Elektra Nonesuch label. It was released in 1998 and features performances by Frisell, bassist Viktor Krauss and drummer Jim Keltner. The cover art is by comics artist Jim Woodring.

== Reception ==
The Allmusic review by Richard S. Ginell awarded the album 4 stars calling it "an immensely likable, easy-grooving CD that defies one to put a label on it... this is thoughtful, free-thinking, ear-friendly jamming that was recorded in bustling Burbank, CA. but sounds as if it was laid down in a relaxed cabin in the hills".

Professional ratings
Review scores
Source	Rating
Allmusic	4/5 stars
The Penguin Guide to Jazz Recordings	3.5/4 stars

== Track listing ==
All compositions by Bill Frisell.

1. "Blues for Los Angeles" – 5:18
2. "Verona" – 3:09
3. "Godson Song" – 4:38
4. "Girl Asks Boy (Part 1)" – 3:36
5. "Pleased to Meet You" – 4:12
6. "Lookout For Hope" – 10:20
7. "Nature's Symphony" – 4:58
8. "Egg Radio" – 5:06
9. "Ballroom" – 3:22
10. "Girl Asks Boy (Part 2)" – 2:30
11. "Sherlock Jr." – 2:51
12. "Gone, Just Like a Train" – 5:30
13. "The Wife and Kid" – 5:49
14. "Raccoon Cat" – 3:24
15. "Lonesome" – 4:17

== Personnel ==
- Bill Frisell – guitar
- Viktor Krauss – bass
- Jim Keltner – drums
