= Tony Scherr =

American jazz and folk rock musician

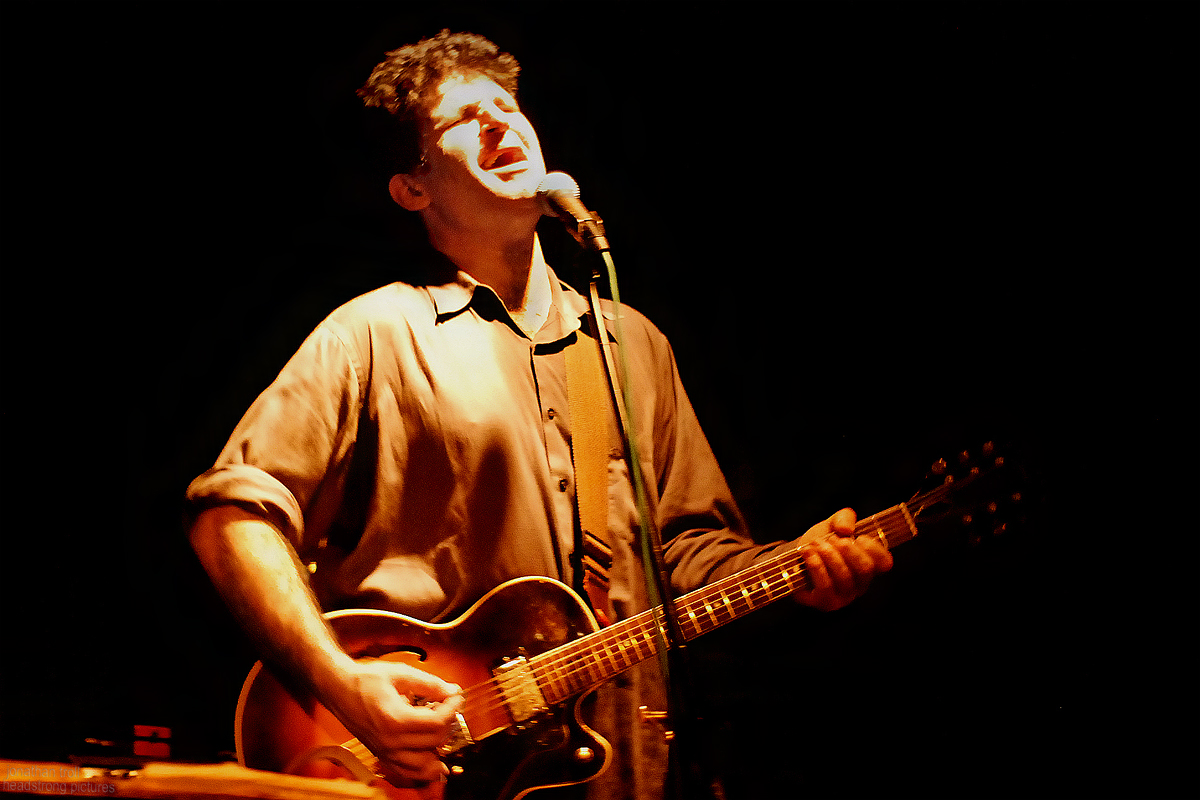
- Tony Scherr at Marion's Marquee Lounge, East Village, New York City (December 4, 2007)

Background information
- Born: New Haven, Connecticut, U.S.
- Genres: Jazz, rock, folk rock
- Occupation(s): Musician, singer-songwriter, record producer
- Instrument(s): Guitar, bass guitar, upright bass
- Years active: 1980s–present
- Labels: Smells Like

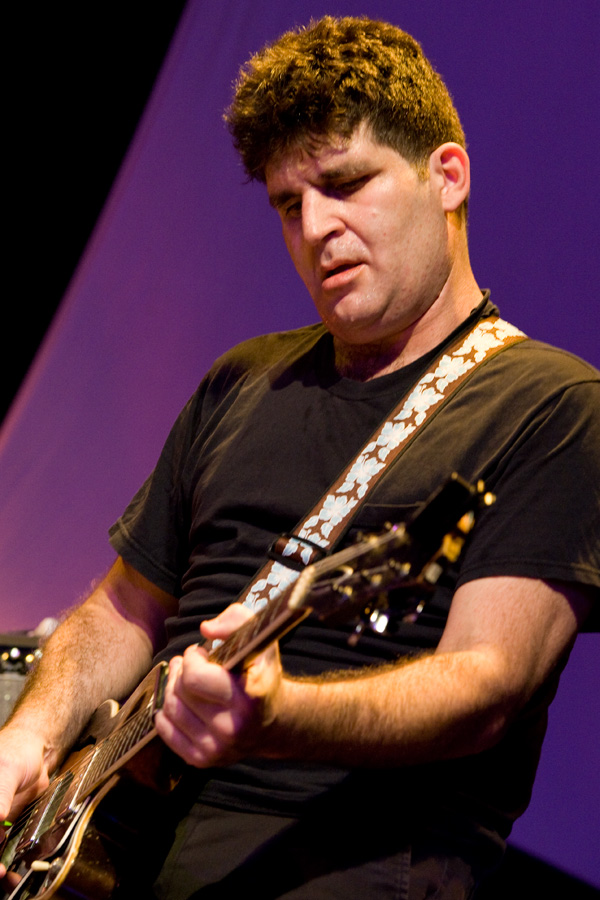
Tony Scherr, moers festival 2011

Tony Scherr is an American jazz and folk rock bassist, guitarist, singer-songwriter, and record producer.

== Biography ==
Scherr was born in New Haven, Connecticut, and is a graduate of the Hammonasset School. He played with Woody Herman as a teenager, and moved to New York City in the late-1980s, where he became a prolific session musician, working with artists such as Bill Frisell, John Scofield, Norah Jones, and Ana Egge. He has been a member of a number of bands, such as The Lounge Lizards, Sex Mob, Jesse Harris and the Ferdinandos, and Chris Brown and the Citizen Band. Scherr owns a recording studio and has worked as record producer for many of the artists he performs with.

In 2002, Tony Scherr released his first solo album, Come Around, on Smells Like Records. His song "Sacramento" was later covered by Leslie Feist on her album Let It Die, with alternate lyrics and a new title, "Lonely Lonely".

Tony Scherr's second album, Twist in the Wind, was released March 17, 2008.

== Discography ==
=== Solo albums ===
- Come Around (2002)
- Twist in the Wind (2008)

=== Sex Mob ===
- Din of Inequity (1998)
- Solid Sender (2000)
- Theatre and Dance (2000)
- Sex Mob Does Bond (2001)
- Dime Grind Palace (2003)
- Sexotica (2006)
- Sexmob meets Medeski Live in Willisau 2006 (2009)
- Sexmob Plays Fellini: Cinema, Circus & Spaghetti, the Music of Nino Rota (2013)
- Cultural Capital (2017)
- The Hard Way (2023)

=== Contributions ===
- Al Di Meola – Kiss My Axe (1991)
- Franklin Kiermyer & Jericho – Break Down the Walls (1992)
- One O'Clock Lab Band – Best of One O'Clock (1992)
- Teddy Kumpel – Nome Sane? (1994)
- The Allan Chase Quartet – Dark Clouds with Silver Linings (1994)
- Maria Schneider – Coming About (1995)
- Wolfgang Muthspiel – Loaded, Like New (1995)
- Either/Orchestra – Across the Omniverse (1996)
- Greg Skaff – Blues and Other News (1996)
- Tim Sessions – And Another Thing (1996)
- Brad Shepik and the Commuters – Loan (1997)
- Bruce Saunders – Forget Everything (1997)
- Charles Socci – Visit (1997)
- Michael Blake – Kingdom of Champa (1997)
- Michael Dean – Right Here for You (1997)
- New York Voices – Sing the Songs of Paul Simon (1997)
- Scott Wendholt – Beyond Thursday (1997)
- John Lurie – Fishing with John (1998)
- Michelle Lewis – Little Leviathan (1998)
- Slow Poke – At Home (1998)
- Steven Bernstein – Diaspora Soul (1999)
- Wolfgang Muthspiel – Work in Progress 89–98 (1999)
- John Scofield – Bump (2000)
- Maria Schneider – Orchestra Allegresse (2000)
- Marvin Pontiac – Legendary Marvin Pontiac (2000)
- Slow Poke – Redemption (2000)
- Teddy Kumpel – Songs in Tomato Sauce (2000)
- Tridruga – Tridruga (2000)
- Barney McAll – Release the Day (2001)
- Dom Um Romao – Lake of Perseverance (2001)
- Michael Blake – Drift (2001)
- Norah Jones – First Sessions (2001)
- Spottiswoode – Spottiswoode and His Enemies (2001)
- Norah Jones – Come Away With Me (2002)
- Ani DiFranco – Trust (2004)
- Ana Egge – Out Past the Lights (2004)
- Bill Frisell - Unspeakable (2004)
- Ani DiFranco – Knuckle Down (2005)
- Bill Frisell – East/West (2005)
- Rosanna Goodman - My Old Man (2006)
- Rod Alonzo - Cyclists (2006)
- Ana Egge – Lazy Days (2007)
- Chris Brown and the Citizens' Band – Oblivion (2007)
- Bill Frisell – History, Mystery (2008)
- Jenny Scheinman - Jenny Scheinman (2008)
- Bill Frisell – All We Are Saying (2011)
- Snarky Puppy – Family Dinner – Volume 1 (2013)
- Bill Frisell - Guitar in the Space Age! (2014)
- Rocket Sci - Bond Riviera (2021)
- Rick Peckham - Left End (2005)
