= History, Mystery =

Studio album by Bill Frisell
- Released: 2008
- Genre: Chamber jazz Post-bop; Folk jazz Jazz fusion World fusion
- Label: Elektra Nonesuch
- Producer: Lee Townsend

Bill Frisell chronology
Floratone (2007)	History, Mystery (2008)	Disfarmer (2009)

History, Mystery is the 20th album by Bill Frisell to be released on the Elektra Nonesuch label. It was released in 2008.

== Reception ==
The Allmusic review by Thom Jurek awarded the album 4½ stars, stating, "Frisell's inherent love of formal lyricism, expansive harmonics, and divergent musical histories reflects his tireless passion for tracing sources. In composing his own material, he also interprets and arranges his sources. On History, Mystery he achieves musical alchemy; he creates something new from familiar, exotic, and even forgotten forms, providing listeners with a magical aural experience".

Professional ratings
Review scores
Source	Rating
Allmusic	4.5/5 stars

== Track listing ==
All compositions by Bill Frisell except as indicated.

Disc 1

1. "Imagination" – 1:51
2. "Probability Cloud" – 4:45
3. "Probability Cloud Part 2" – 1:01
4. "Out of Body" – 2:27
5. "Struggle" – 5:32
6. "A Momentary Suspension of Doubt" – 0:38
7. "Onward" – 1:38
8. "Baba Drame" (Boubacar Traoré) – 6:09
9. "What We Need" – 1:37
10. "A Change Is Gonna Come" (Sam Cooke) – 8:49
11. "Jackie-ing" (Thelonious Monk) – 2:55
12. "Show Me" – 3:16
13. "Boo and Scout" – 2:28
14. "Struggle Part 2" – 6:25
15. "Heal" – 1:41
16. "Another Momentary Suspension of Doubt" – 0:37
17. "Probability Cloud (Reprise)" – 1:36

Disc 2

1. "Monroe" – 4:18
2. "Lazy Robinson" – 2:18
3. "Question #1" – 1:14
4. "Answer #1" – 0:40
5. "Faces" – 1:52
6. "Sub-Conscious Lee" (Lee Konitz) – 5:39
7. "Monroe Part 2" – 1:52
8. "Question #2" – 0:56
9. "Lazy Robinson Part 2" – 3:18
10. "What We Need Part 2" – 1:16
11. "Waltz for Baltimore" – 8:47
12. "Answer #2" – 1:50
13. "Monroe Part 3" – 2:58

== Personnel ==
- Bill Frisell – guitars
- Ron Miles – cornet
- Greg Tardy – tenor saxophone, clarinet
- Jenny Scheinman – violin
- Eyvind Kang – viola
- Hank Roberts – cello
- Tony Scherr – bass
- Kenny Wollesen – drums
