= Athlantis =

Live album by Eyvind Kang
- Released: July 10, 2007
- Recorded: May 7 & 8, 2006, at the Teatro Comunale di Modena, Italy during AngelicA and l'Altro Suono Festival
- Genre: Contemporary classical music
- Length: 41:47
- Label: Ipecac Recordings IPC 87
- Producer: Eyvind Kang and Mell Dettmer

Eyvind Kang chronology
Aestuarium (2005)	Athlantis (2007)	The Yelm Sessions (2007)

Athlantis is a live album by violinist/multi-instrumentalist Eyvind Kang which was released in 2007 on Ipecac Recordings.

== Reception ==
Professional ratings
Review scores
Source	Rating
PopMatters	7/10 stars
Allmusic	2.5/5 stars
Spin	7/10

The PopMatters review by Sean Murphy stated "Those who cherish the oddness in Kang (or, to invoke another of his wonderfully appropriate album titles, the “sweetness of sickness”), won't be disappointed here".

The Allmusic review by Stephen Eddins observed "The music of Athlantis defies easy pigeonholing, so identifying its attributes may be the best way to describe it. Its primary quality is an aura of dark mystery, a sense of conjuring supernatural forces. This is not the kind of piece most people would want to listen to alone in the dark".

Spin noted "Athlantis, Kang's second disc for Ipecac, is truly out there. Inspired by Renaissance-era texts, he utilizes the voices of Mike Patton and Jessika Kenney to render his chillingly phantasmal choral arrangements. Think the monolith scene from 2001 as rendered by Mr. Bungle and you're almost there."

== Track listing ==
All compositions by Eyvind Kang with lyrics by Giordano Bruno (tracks 2–5, 8, 11 & 12) and Marbod of Rennes (tracks 6 & 9)

1. "Ministers of Friday" - 1:04
2. "Vespertiliones" - 1:07
3. "Andegavenses" - 5:09
4. "Rabianara" - 5:35
5. "Inquisitio" - 3:41
6. "Ros Vespertinus" - 5:02
7. "Conciliator" - 2:36
8. "Iupitter" - 1:28
9. "Repetitio" - 3:17
10. "Lamentatio" - 3:26
11. "Athlantis" - 4:49
12. "Aquilas" - 4:33

== Personnel ==
- Eyvind Kang - composer, director
- Jessika Kenney, Mike Patton - vocals
- Walter Zanetti - acoustic guitar, electric guitar
- Alberto Capelli – acoustic guitar, electric guitar, sitar

Ensemble di Ottoni di Modena

- Marco Catelli, Marzio Montali - trumpet
- Valentino Spaggiari - trombone
- Gianluigi Paganelli - bass tuba
- Aldo Sisillo - conductor

Coro da Camera di Bologna

- Arianna Lanci, Atsuko Koyama, Mila Ferri, Sonila Kaceli, Soon So Kyoung - soprano vocals
- Alessandra Masini, Angela Troilo, Elisa Bonazzi, Laura Vicinelli, Olga Adamovich - contralti vocals
- Antonio Frezzetti, Kei Nagakawa, Michele Napolitano, Sergio Giachini, Sergio Turra - tenor vocals
- Enrico Volontieri, Giacomo Serra, Marcus Köhler, Simone Astolfi - bass vocals
- Giovanna Giovannini - assistant choir master
- Pier Paolo Scattolin - choir master
