= Guitar in the Space Age! =

Studio album by Bill Frisell
- Released: October 6, 2014
- Recorded: 2014
- Studio: Flora Recording & Playback, Portland, OR
- Genre: Jazz, pop, rock
- Length: 55:08
- Label: OKeh
- Producer: Lee Townsend

Bill Frisell chronology
Big Sur (2013)	Guitar in the Space Age! (2014)	When You Wish Upon a Star (2016)

Guitar in the Space Age! is an album by Bill Frisell featuring interpretations of songs and instrumentals from the 1960s which was released by OKeh in 2014.

== Reception ==
Professional ratings
Review scores
Source	Rating
AllMusic	4/5 stars
The Guardian	4/5 stars
PopMatters	6/10 stars
Tom Hull	B+

In his review for AllMusic, Thom Jurek notes that "Guitar in the Space Age! is a joyous recording. Far from an exercise in mere nostalgia, it reveals new reasons as to why these tunes are eternal. Frisell and his collaborators understood exactly what they were going for, and it sounds like they had a hell of a great time getting there". The Guardian's John Fordham observed "This is an old-school electric guitar fan’s album, played by one of the most creative guitar fans in the world". PopMatters Associate Music Editor John Garratt was less enthusiastic and said "Guitar in the Space Age! is professionally executed place holding. I’m not saying you have to be a baby boomer to enjoy it, but you probably need to be one in order to rank it as one of Frisell’s top five recordings"

Interviewed by Chip Stern in 2014 for billfrisell.com, Frisell said of fellow band-member Greg Leisz: "Playing with Greg has never felt to me like lead/rhythm. It's always been this kind of effortless conversation... where we don't have to hold anything back. It never feels like we get in each other's way. You see, I like to pretend that I'm a singer. That's so much of the way I think on the instrument, trying to mimic a voice. And Greg has played with so many singers (it might be easier to list the ones he hasn't played with), so he's just a master accompanist, super supportive, but in the most spontaneous, in the moment, unpredictable kind of way. Maybe that's why it works. We have this deep bond, but we've never really had to talk about it or plan anything or arrange anything. I don't want to jinx it."

== Track listing ==
1. "Pipeline" (Brian Carman, Bob Spickard) – 7:06
2. "Turn! Turn! Turn!" (Pete Seeger) – 2:40
3. "Messin' with the Kid" (Mel London) – 2:59
4. "Surfer Girl" (Brian Wilson) – 4:14
5. "Rumble" (Milt Grant, Link Wray) – 4:56
6. "The Shortest Day" (Bill Frisell) – 4:57
7. "Rebel Rouser" (Duane Eddy, Lee Hazlewood) – 3:39
8. "Baja" (Hazlewood) – 3:37
9. "Cannonball Rag" (Merle Travis) – 2:56
10. "Tired of Waiting for You" (Ray Davies) – 6:02
11. "Reflections from the Moon" (Speedy West) – 3:21
12. "Bryant's Boogie" (Jimmy Bryant) – 3:09
13. "Lift Off" (Frisell) – 2:17
14. "Telstar" (Joe Meek) – 3:15

== Personnel ==
- Bill Frisell – electric guitar
- Greg Leisz – pedal steel guitar, electric guitar
- Tony Scherr – bass, acoustic guitar on "Rebel Rouser"
- Kenny Wollesen – drums, percussion, vibes
