= Good Dog, Happy Man =

Studio album by Bill Frisell
- Released: 1999
- Studio: O'Henry Sound (Burbank, California)
- Genre: Folk jazz, new acoustic, Americana
- Length: 61:51
- Label: Elektra Nonesuch
- Producer: Lee Townsend

Bill Frisell chronology
Gone, Just Like a Train (1998)	Good Dog, Happy Man (1999)	The Sweetest Punch (1999)

Good Dog, Happy Man is the 11th album by Bill Frisell to be released on the Elektra Nonesuch label. It was released in 1999 and features performances by Frisell, steel guitarist Greg Leisz, keyboardist Wayne Horvitz, bassist Viktor Krauss and drummer Jim Keltner with a guest appearance by Ry Cooder on slide guitar.

== Reception ==
Professional ratings
Review scores
Source	Rating
Allmusic	4/5 stars
The Penguin Guide to Jazz Recordings	3.5/4 stars

JazzTimes called the album "the latest, logical extension in the saga of Frisell’s maturing voice." and summarized; "Triads galore, sweet tunes, organic funkiness, and a general laconic grace keep the music rooted, while also searching. What else could we ask for? Good Dog, Happy Man is a recording full of gentle things, bolstered by innate smarts and rugged musicality. The Allmusic review by Richard S. Ginell awarded the album 4 stars, stating, "Again, Frisell often captures a loose, evolutionary jamming quality in these sessions, playing the country accents off of his jazz sensibilities. Unlike its predecessor, though, you can't imagine this being recorded on a backwoods front porch, for there are some production tricks and distant-sounding electronic loops that give away its Burbank studio origins. Purists on either side of the jazz/country divide are hereby warned to back off so that the rest of us can enjoy this".

== Track listing ==
All compositions by Bill Frisell except as indicated.

1. "Rain, Rain" – 2:45
2. "Roscoe" – 3:43
3. "Big Shoe" – 3:49
4. "My Buffalo Girl" – 8:50
5. "Shenandoah" – for Johnny Smith (Traditional) – 6:09
6. "Cadillac 1959" – 6:16
7. "The Pioneers" – 5:16
8. "Cold, Cold Ground" – 9:01
9. "That Was Then" – 5:29
10. "Monroe" – 4:19
11. "Good Dog, Happy Man" – 2:33
12. "Poem For Eva" – 3:41

== Personnel ==
- Bill Frisell – electric and acoustic guitars, loops and music boxes
- Greg Leisz – pedal steel, Dobro, lap steel, Weissenborn, National steel guitar and mandolin
- Wayne Horvitz – organ, piano, samples
- Viktor Krauss – bass
- Jim Keltner – drums and percussion
- Ry Cooder (5) – guitar
