= 7 NADEs =

Studio album by Eyvind Kang
- Released: April 23, 1996
- Genre: Jazz, Contemporary classical music
- Length: 45:13
- Label: Tzadik TZ 7013
- Producer: Eyvind Kang

Eyvind Kang chronology
7 NADEs (1996)	Sweetness Of Sickness (1996)

7 NADEs is the debut album by violinist/multi-instrumentalist Eyvind Kang which was released in 1996 on John Zorn's Tzadik Records as part of the Composer Series.

== Reception ==
Professional ratings
Review scores
Source	Rating
Allmusic	3/5 stars

Allmusic music critic Stacia Proefrock wrote:

In a world where almost no sound exists in a pure space without distraction, this combination of thematically distant musical bits does seem to make sense, but it inhibits his ability to set an overall tone for the work. Occasionally beautiful or beautifully painful, this album nonetheless suffers from its randomness.

— Proefrock, Stacia. "Theater of Mineral NADEs > Review". Allmusic.

== Track listing ==
All compositions by Eyvind Kang

1. "Theme from 1st Nade" - 3:01
2. "Angel With Wings Torn Off" - 3:23
3. "Earth" - 2:17
4. "Thin, Rabid, Pearly Tunnel" - 4:45
5. "Inevitability/The Engagement" - 1:35
6. "Winged Head over Troubled Waters" - 5:00
7. "5th Nade/Invisible Man" - 7:40
8. "Universal" - 7:55
9. "Theme from 6th Nade" - 1:45
10. "Extra Cry" - 2:40
11. "The Banishment" - 2:58
12. "Living Corpses" - 2:14

== Personnel ==
- Eyvind Kang - violin, keyboards, piano, bass, erhu, harp, cymbal, tape manipulations, microphone, noises, voice
- Brian Fairbanks (track 9), Susanna Knapp (tracks 1 & 5) - flute
- Thuc Ngyen - clarinet (track 9)
- Craig Flory, Jessica Lurie - alto saxophone (track 7)
- Mike Anderson (tracks 1 & 5), Angelina Baldoz (track 11) - trumpet
- Steve Moore - trombone (track 5)
- Don Ankney - French horn (track 6 & 9)
- Scott Perry - oboe (track 6 & 9)
- Nancy Bondurant - bassoon (track 6 & 9)
- Terry Hsu, Alan Kestle - violin (tracks 1 & 5)
- Brent Arnold - cello (tracks 1, 5 & 11)
- Tim Young - guitar, amplifier, voice (tracks 1, 2, 4 & 5)
- Mr. Ko - guitar, keyboards (track 4 & 10)
- Byron Au Yong - harpsichord (tracks 1 & 5)
- Craig Flory - Moog synthesizer, acoustic guitar (track 4)
- Christina Schinkei - electronics (track 2)
- David Slusser - slussomatic (track 4)
- Scott Colburn - tape splice (track 4)
- Scott Colburn - tape manipulations, fire (track 6 & 8)
- Ian Rashkin (tracks 1 & 5), Geoffrey Harper (track 7), Tari Nelson-Zagar (track 7) - bass
- Reggie Watts - drum machine (track 7)
- Jarrad Kaplan - midi drums (track 12)
- Mike Stone - percussion (track 5)
- Yoko Murao - narration (track 11)
- Teresa Truax - French narration (tracks 1 & 5)
- Courtney Agguire (tracks 1, 5), Crystal (track 5), Jasmine (track 5), Angela Lopes (track 2), Brad Mowen (track 10), Mari Murao (track 4), Om (track 7) - voice
