= Yuniya edi kwon =

American composer (born 1989)

yuniya edi kwon
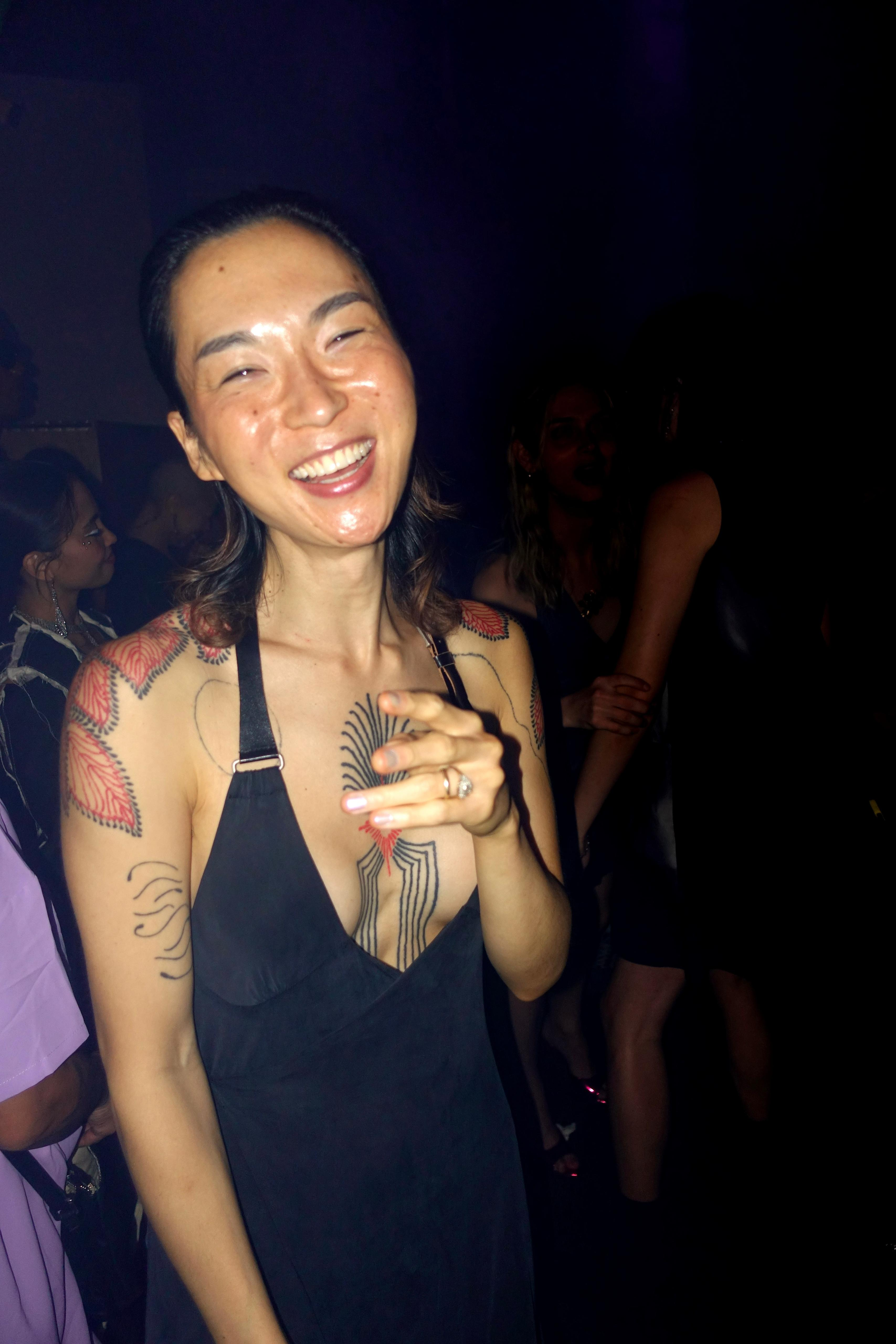
- yuniya edi kwon in Brooklyn, New York (2025)
- Born: 1989 (age 36–37); Minneapolis, Minnesota, U.S.
- Education: University of Cincinnati – College-Conservatory of Music
- Occupations: Violinist; composer
- Awards: Guggenheim Fellowship (2025)
- Musical career
- Instrument: Violinist
- Formerly of: Juni One Set; Sun Han Guild; The Happy Maladies
- Website: yuniya.net

yuniya edi kwon (stylized in lower-case; born 1989), is an American violinist and composer. She is a 2025 Guggenheim Fellow.

== Biography ==
kwon was born and raised in Minneapolis, to Korean immigrant parents. She began studying the violin at the age of ten. She graduated from University of Cincinnati – College-Conservatory of Music as a jazz studies student. She was a 2016 United States Artists Fellow.

In 2021, she performed the piece Seep as part of a Bang on a Can event; David Wright said that "whistling, vocalizing, and folk-inflected violin effects evoked woodland spirits in" the piece. She was featured in The Washington Post's "22 for ‘22" series, with nominator Wang Lu saying that Kwon’s works have a "naturally musical" quality and "don't make me feel that they are too much 'carved'". In a May 2023 review of her piece Earth Iridescence/Sorrow Churn, performed by Sun Han Guild, Vanessa Ague called her voice "a moment of catharsis".

kwon won a 2023 Foundation for Contemporary Arts Robert Rauschenberg Award in Music/Sound. She was a 2023-2025 Princeton University Arts Fellow. She performed violin at the 2024 Monheim Triennale. She performed as violinist on Stephan Crump's 2024 album Slow Water; Thomas Conrad of Stereophile said in a review for that album that "melodies sound more yearning when played on a violin". In 2025, she was awarded a Guggenheim Fellowship in Music Composition.

kwon co-founded the ensemble Sun Han Guild, and she is also part of the collective Juni One Set. She has also been guitarist and violinist for experimental folk-rock band The Happy Maladies. Regarding her performance style, UK Jazz News said that she "draws on her Korean heritage and Japanese butoh dance as well as jazz and classical music".

kwon lives in Brooklyn. She is transgender.
