= Reiner Michalke =

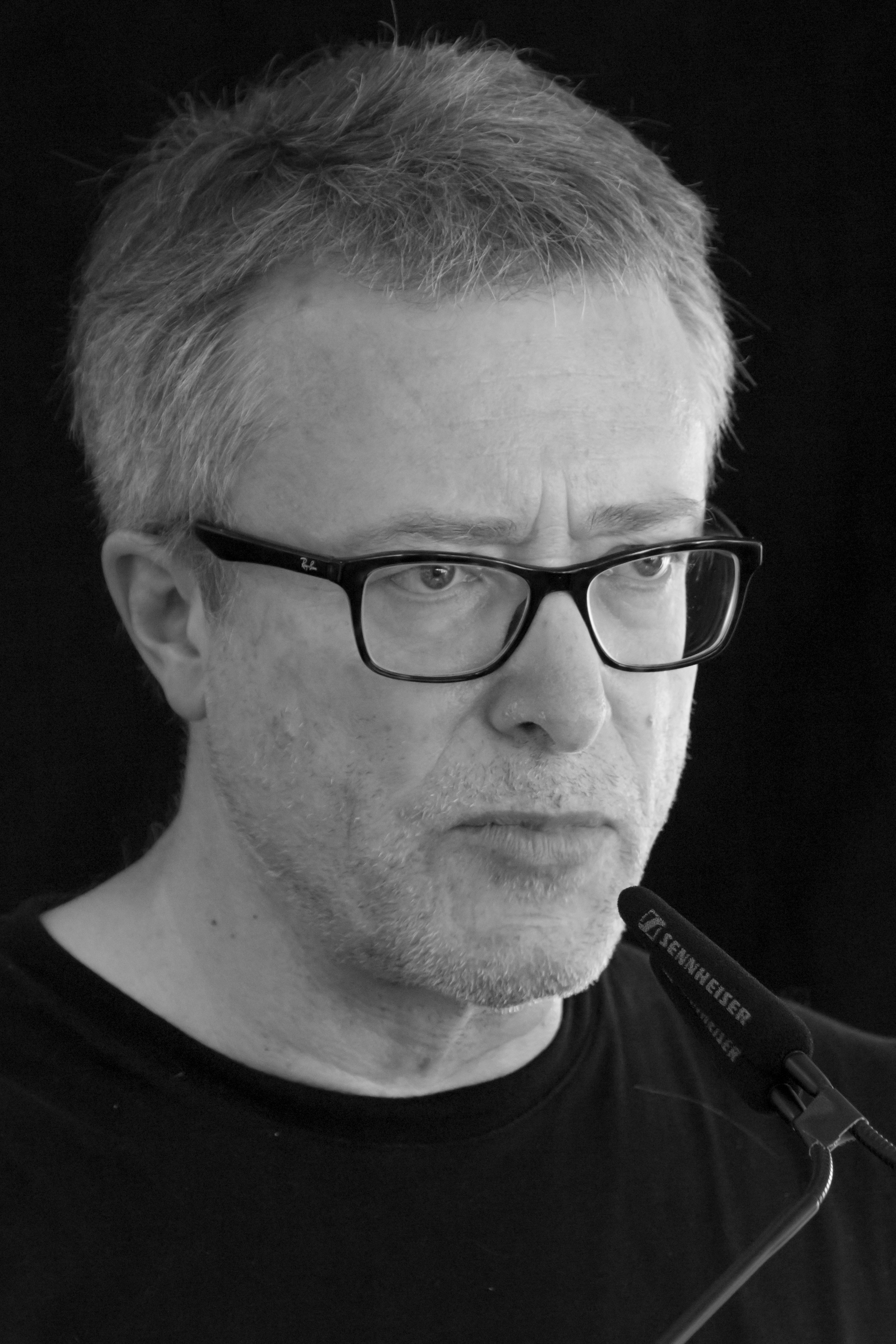
Reiner Michalke at the mœrs festival 2014

Reiner Michalke (born 1956) is the artistic director of the concert venue Stadtgarten in Cologne/Germany. From 2005 to 2016 he served as artistic director of the Moers Festival. Since October 2018 he is managing artistic director of the Monheim Triennale.

== Work as musician ==
Reiner Michalke was born in Cologne, Germany. He studied music at the Cologne University of Music and economics at the University of Cologne. Between 1976 and 1986, he worked as a freelance musician with various groups (Extempore and NoNett to name but a few). From 1980 to 1986, he also worked as a lecturer for bass and ensemble playing at the Musikschule Remscheid.

== Work as artistic director ==
Reiner Michalke is founding chairman of Initiative Kölner Jazz Haus e.V. which he initiated with other musicians in 1978. In the same year he produced the 1st Kölner Jazz Haus Festival. In 1986 he became CEO of Cologne's Stadtgarten-Restaurant Betriebs-GmbH, an organisation for which he still curates the concerts. From 1989 to 1995 he was one of the artistic directors of the festival post this & neo that and from 1994 to 2007 of MusikTriennale Köln. In May 2005 Reiner Michalke was appointed as director of the Moers festival, which he took over in 2006. Since October 2018 Michalke is managing artistic director of the Monheim Triennale.

== Work for public media ==
Beside his work curating concert and festival programs, Reiner Michalke also works as a producer for radio and television with Westdeutscher Rundfunk (WDR), Deutschlandfunk and Deutsche Welle. He has also produced events for the Büro für innovative Kulturprojekte und Kommunikation in Berlin.

== Cultural engagement ==
Up to his appointment as director of the Moers festival, Reiner Michalke was the Green Party's “resident expert" on Cologne's cultural affairs committee (from 1984), a board member of the Europe Jazz Network (from 1992), and a founding member of and speaker for the organisations “Off Cologne e.V”, “KulturNetz Köln” and "Bundeskonferenz Jazz". At present he is a member of the music advisory council to the City of Cologne.
