= Disfarmer =

Studio album by Bill Frisell
- Released: July 21, 2009
- Recorded: February and May 2008
- Studio: Avast! (Seattle, Washington); Sound Emporium (Nashville, Tennessee)
- Genre: Folk jazz New acoustic Americana
- Length: 71:28
- Label: Elektra Nonesuch
- Producer: Lee Townsend

Bill Frisell chronology
History, Mystery (2008)	Disfarmer (2009)	Beautiful Dreamers (2010)

Disfarmer is the 21st album by Bill Frisell to be released on the Nonesuch label. It features music written to accompany a retrospective of photographs taken by Mike Disfarmer.

== Reception ==
The Allmusic review by Thom Jurek awarded the album 4 stars, stating, "the players are all excellent, but nobody here, not even Frisell, shines. Still, it is a pleasant recording to listen to if not hang on to. It floats and hovers about the room as a peaceful backdrop. Disfarmer is to be taken as a soundtrack rather than as a Frisell album proper, and listened to as a series of sketches rather than as a fully assembled statement from the artist".

Professional ratings
Review scores
Source	Rating
Allmusic	4/5 stars

== Track listing ==
All compositions by Bill Frisell except as indicated.

1. "Disfarmer Theme" – 5:37
2. "Lonely Man" – 1:15
3. "Lost, Night" – 1:50
4. "Farmer" – 1:03
5. "Focus" – 2:26
6. "Peter Miller's Discovery" – 4:43
7. "That's Alright, Mama" (Arthur Crudup) – 3:10
8. "Little Girl" – 3:42
9. "Little Boy" – 1:16
10. "No One Gets In" – 2:47
11. "Lovesick Blues" (Cliff Friend, Irving Mills) – 2:48
12. "I Can't Help It (If I'm Still in Love with You)" (Hank Williams" 3:50
13. "Shutter, Dream" (Bill Frisell, Viktor Krauss, Greg Leisz, Jenny Scheinman) – 4:26
14. "Exposed" – 2:12
15. "The Wizard" – 1:52
16. "Think" – 4:37
17. "Drink" – 4:29
18. "Play" – 1:32
19. "I Am Not a Farmer" – 3:36
20. "Small Town" – 1:00
21. "Arkansas Part 1" – 1:53
22. "Arkansas Part 2" – 2:19
23. "Arkansas Part 3" – 1:54
24. "Lost Again, Dark" – 2:06
25. "Natural Light" – 2:59
26. "Did You See Him?" – 2:06

== Personnel ==
- Bill Frisell – guitars
- Greg Leisz – steel guitars, mandolin
- Jenny Scheinman – violin
- Viktor Krauss – bass
