= Theater of Mineral NADEs =

Studio album by Eyvind Kang
- Released: April 21, 1998
- Genre: Jazz, Contemporary classical music
- Length: 44:29
- Label: Tzadik TZ 7032
- Producer: Eyvind Kang

Eyvind Kang chronology
Dying Ground (1998)	Theater of Mineral NADEs (1998)	Pieces of Time (1999)

Theater of Mineral NADEs is an album by the violinist/multi-instrumentalist Eyvind Kang, released in 1998 on John Zorn's Tzadik Records as part of the Composer Series.

== Reception ==
Professional ratings
Review scores
Source	Rating
AllMusic	4/5 stars

CMJ New Music Monthly reviewer Randall Roberts stated: "On Theater Kang createsboth minimal glimpses and lush portraits, blending seemingly disparate musics; mandolins and tablas intertwine, harmoniums, violins, synthesizers and cellos flutter simultaneously. Experienced as a whole, Theater of Mineral NADEs runs like one long quasi-cinematic experience, as though a narrative is running through the music and telling its own story." AllMusic music critic Stacia Proefrock wrote: "Theater of Mineral NADEs does not reach as far as some of Kang's previous work, but he also manages to succeed at nearly everything he tries on this album. It is a well executed, thoughtful piece."

== Track listing ==
All compositions by Eyvind Kang

1. "The Earth & The Moon" - 2:02
2. "Jewel of the Nade" - 1:20
3. "Theory of the Supreme Ones" - 0:38
4. "The Anointment" - 1:30
5. "Mineralia" - 2:58
6. "Pleasures of the Nade" - 1:20
7. "Consensit Spiritus" - 3:16
8. "(If I Sing a Song) So Good It" - 1:50
9. "New Moon" - 2:00
10. "Suleiman" - 2:38
11. "Berdache" - 2:19
12. "Moon" - 1:14
13. "Mercury" - 0:47
14. "The Curse" - 1:04
15. "Lanvaettir" - 0:35
16. "Fate Is Sealed" - 0:47
17. "Private Mistery" - 0:38
18. "Lost Souls" - 1:27
19. "Ghost Dance" - 2:06
20. "Lost Love" - 1:09
21. "Lover Not a Hater" - 3:51
22. "Mystic Nade" - 3:05
23. "Mary of Magdalen" - 5:09
24. "Jewel of the Nade" - 0:46

== Personnel ==
- Eyvind Kang - violin, guitar, bass, keyboards, mandolin, tuba, recorder, percussion, voice
- Susanna Knapp, Jessica Lurie - flute
- Mike Anderson - trumpet
- Steve Moore - trombone
- James Philp - cornemuse, crumhorn, recorders, bass flute
- Emmanuelle Somer - oboe
- Terry Hsu, Alan Kestle - violin
- Brent Arnold - cello
- Trey Spruance - twelve-string guitar
- Timothy Young - guitar
- Christian Asplund - harmonium
- Tari Nelson-Zagar, Dave Pascal, Ian Rashkin - bass
- Tucker Martine, Mike Stone - drums
- Mint - finger cymbals
- Vishal Nagar - tabla
- Ed Pias - percussion
- Courtney Agguire - voice
