= Natalie MacMaster =

Canadian musician

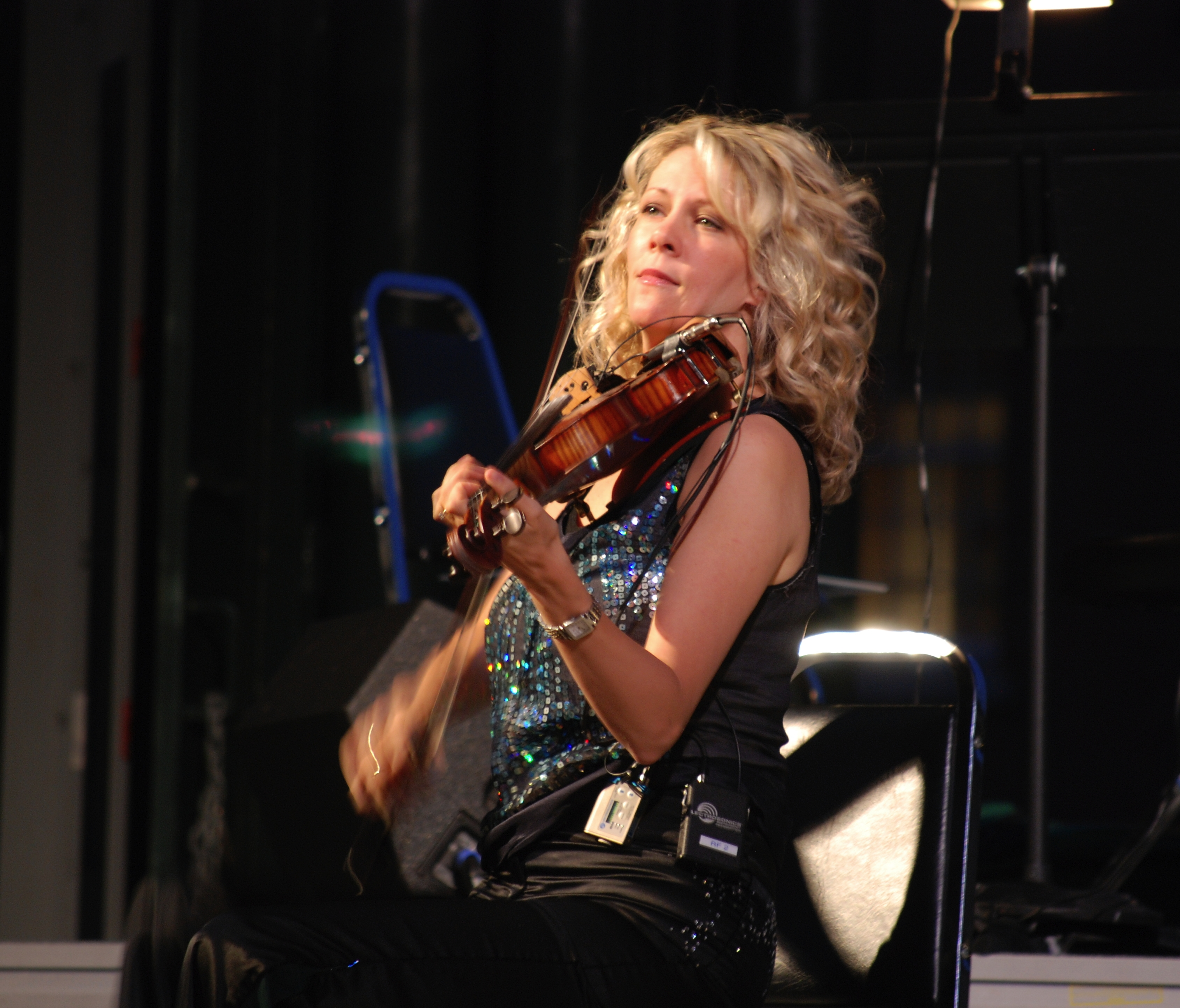
- MacMaster performing in Centralville, Massachusetts, 2007

Background information
- Born: Natalie Ann MacMaster; June 13, 1972 (age 53); Troy, Nova Scotia, Canada
- Genres: Cape Breton fiddle music
- Occupation: Musician
- Instruments: Fiddle, piano, vocals
- Years active: 1989–present
- Label: Rounder Records
- Website: NatalieMacMaster.com

Natalie MacMaster CM ONS (born June 13, 1972) is a Canadian fiddler from Troy, Inverness County, Nova Scotia, who plays Cape Breton fiddle music. She has toured with the Chieftains, Faith Hill, Carlos Santana and Alison Krauss, and has recorded with Yo-Yo Ma. She has appeared at the Celtic Colours festival in Cape Breton, Celtic Connections in Scotland and MerleFest in the United States.

== Background ==
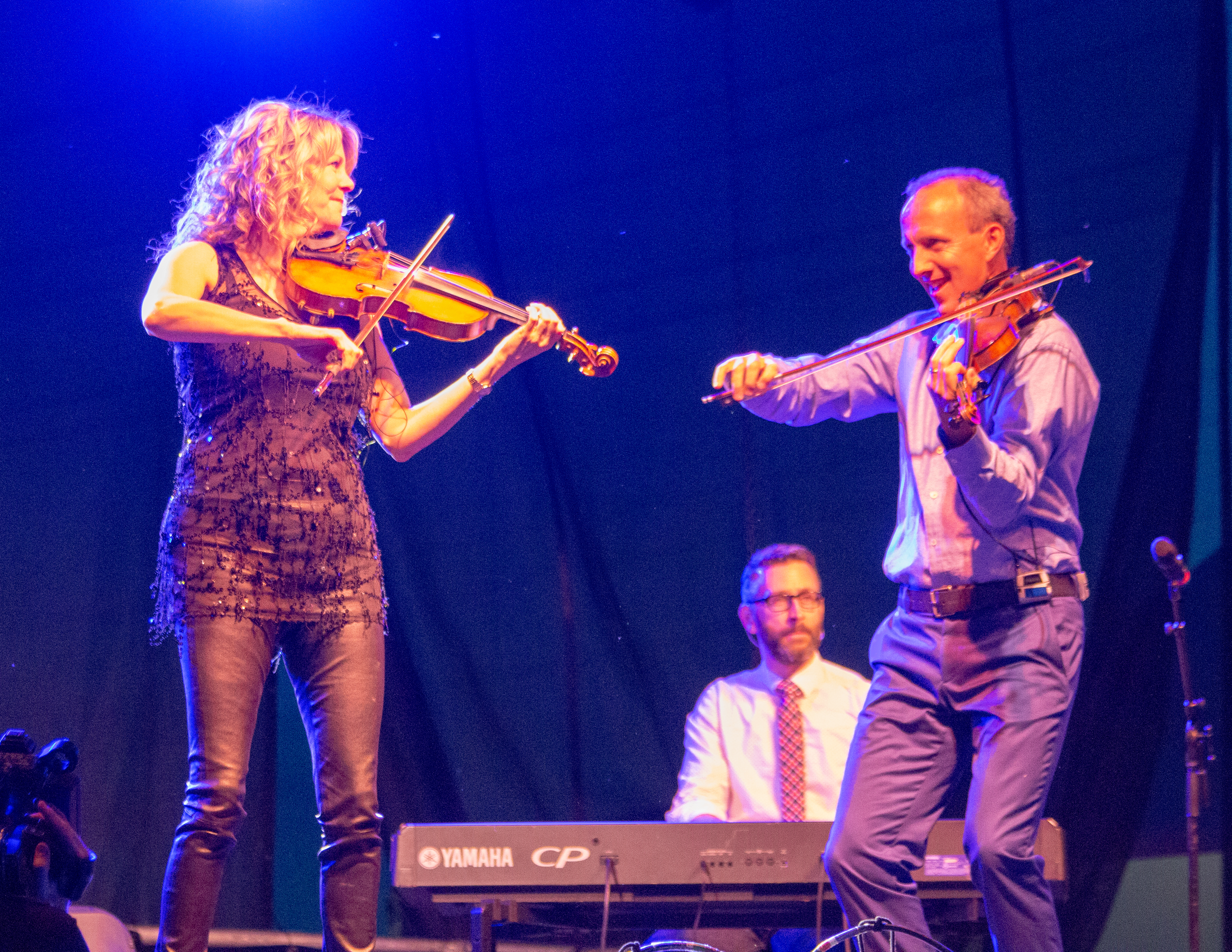
MacMaster and Donnell Leahy performing together at the 2018 Burlington's Sound of Music Festival

MacMaster is the daughter of Alex and Minnie (née Beaton) MacMaster and the sister of Kevin and David MacMaster. She is the niece of the late renowned Cape Breton fiddler Buddy MacMaster and the cousin of two other fiddlers, Ashley MacIsaac and Andrea Beaton. She is also distantly related to Jack White, whose paternal grandparents were from Antigonish and Sydney Mines, Nova Scotia.

In 2002, she married fiddler Donnell Leahy of the Leahy family band, and moved to Lakefield, Ontario. They have seven children, and have performed and recorded together as a duo, and occasionally include their children, who also play fiddle, in their performances.

== Musical career ==
MacMaster began playing the fiddle at the age of nine, and made her performing debut the same year at a square dance in Glencoe Mills, Nova Scotia. When she was 16, she released her first album, Four on the Floor, and a second album, Road to the Isle, followed in 1991. Her first album was self-produced, while her second was co-produced by John Morris Rankin (The Rankin Family) and Tom O'Keefe. Both albums were initially released only on cassette, but Rounder Records omitted a few tracks and re-released them as A Compilation in 1998. In 1999, she performed at the Juno Awards show in Hamilton.

In recent years she has expanded her musical repertoire, mixing her Cape Breton roots with music from Scotland and Ireland, as well as American bluegrass.

In 2004, MacMaster appeared on Sharon, Lois & Bram's 25th Anniversary Concert special titled 25 Years of Skinnamarink that was broadcast on CBC on January 1, 2004, at 7:00pm. She performed two songs with the trio, "C-H-I-C-K-E-N" and "Grandpa's Farm".

== Awards ==
MacMaster has received a number of Canadian music awards, including several "Artist of the Year" awards from the East Coast Music Association, two Juno Awards for best instrumental album, and "Fiddler of the Year" from the Canadian Country Music Association. She was also awarded an honorary doctorate from Niagara University in New York in 2006. In 2006, she was made a member of the Order of Canada and, in 2020, she was made a member of the Order of Nova Scotia. In 2023, she was inducted into the Canadian Fiddle Hall of Honour at the 2023 Canadian Grand Masters event in Truro, Nova Scotia.

== Discography ==
=== Albums ===
Title	Album details	Peak chart positions						Certifications (sales thresholds)
Title	Album details	CAN	US Heat	US Indie	US Folk	US Grass	US World	Certifications (sales thresholds)
Four on the Floor	Release date: 1989; Label: Astro Custom Records	—	—	—	—	—	—	
Road to the Isle	Release date: 1991; Label: Astro Custom Records	—	—	—	—	—	—	
Fit as a Fiddle	Release date: 1993; Label: Rounder Records	—	—	—	—	—	—	CAN: Gold
A Compilation	Release date: 1996; Label: Rounder Records	—	—	—	—	—	—	
No Boundaries	Release date: March 11, 1997; Label: Rounder Records	—	—	—	—	—	—	CAN: Gold
In My Hands	Release date: September 14, 1999; Label: Rounder Records	32	—	—	—	—	6	CAN: Gold
My Roots Are Showing	Release date: April 11, 2000; Label: Rounder Records	—	—	—	—	—	4	
Live	Release date: June 4, 2002; Label: Rounder Records	—	—	—	—	—	—	
Blueprint	Release date: September 9, 2003; Label: Rounder Records	—	—	—	—	6	4	
Natalie & Buddy MacMaster: Traditional Music from Cape Breton Island	Release date: August 18, 2005	—	—	—	—	—	—	
Yours Truly	Release date: October 3, 2006 (Canada), October 10, 2006 (USA); Label: Rounder Records	—	—	—	—	—	10	
Cape Breton Girl	Release date: November 1, 2011; Label: MacMaster Music	—	—	—	—	—	—	
One (with Donnell Leahy)	Release date: April 28, 2015; Label: DLL/MacMaster Music	23	4	15	6	—	1	
A Celtic Family Christmas (with Donnell Leahy)	Release date: 2016	49	—	—	—	10	—	
Sketches	Release date: November 1, 2019	—	—	—	—	9	—	
Canvas (with Donnell Leahy)	Release date: March 17, 2023; Label: DLL/MacMaster Music	—	—	—	—	7	—	

=== Singles ===
Year	Single	Peak positions	Album
Year	Single	CAN AC	Album
1996	"Catharsis"	—	No Boundaries
1997	"Fiddle and Bow" (with Bruce Guthro)	—	No Boundaries
1997	"The Drunken Piper" (with Cookie Rankin)	—	No Boundaries
1999	"In My Hands"	18	In My Hands
1999	"Get Me Through December" (with Alison Krauss)	40	In My Hands
2004	"Appropriate Dipstick"	—	Blueprint
"—" denotes releases that did not chart

=== Music videos ===
Year	Video	Director
1996	"Catharsis"	
1997	"Fiddle and Bow" (with Bruce Guthro)	Andrew MacNaughtan
1997	"The Drunken Piper" (with Cookie Rankin)	Andrew MacNaughtan
1999	"In My Hands"	Christopher Mills
1999	"Get Me Through December" (with Alison Krauss)	Mark Hesselink
2004	"Appropriate Dipstick"	
2014	"Go Tell It on the Mountain" (with Johnny Reid and The Rankins)	Margaret Malandrucco

=== Other appearances ===
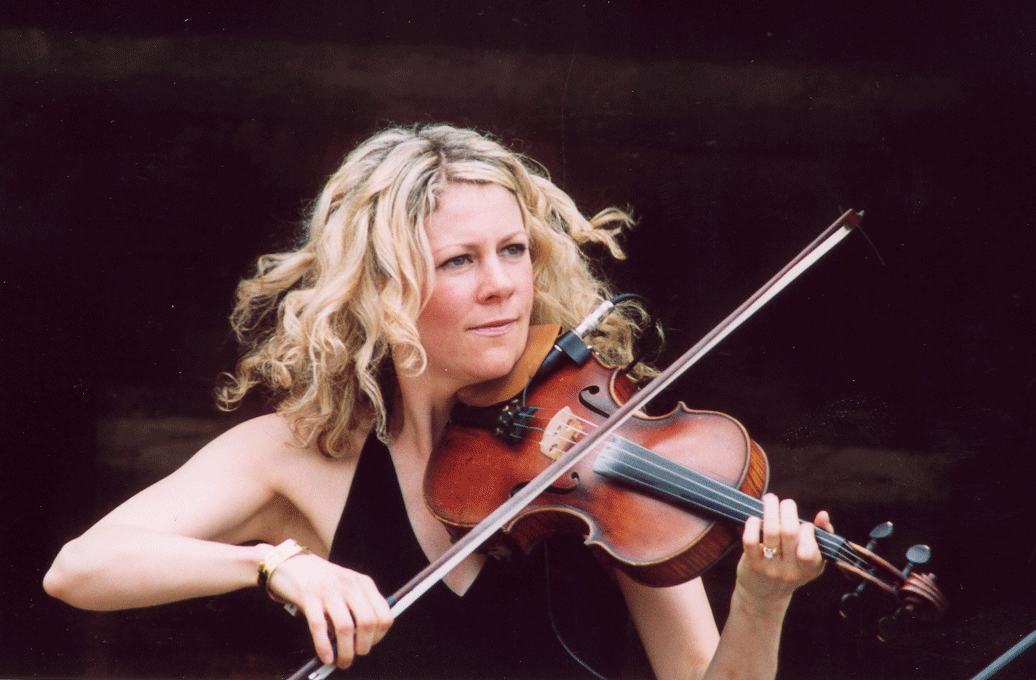
MacMaster at Merlefest, 2004

- Traditional Music From Cape Breton Island, Nimbus NI5383, 1993 (two tracks)
- Celtic Colours – The Road Home, 1997 (one track)
- Celtic Colours – The Second Wave, 1998 (one track)
- Celtic Colours – Forgotten Roots, 1999 (one track)
- Roots Music: An American Journey, Rounder 0501, 2001 (one track)
- Songs for the Savoy, 2001 (one track)
- Celtic Colours — The Colours of Cape Breton, 2002 (one track)
- Celtic Colours — Volume VII, 2003 (one track)
- The Rough Guide to the Music of Canada, 2005 (one track)
- Yo-Yo Ma & Friends: Songs of Joy and Peace; Songs:A Christmas Jig/Mouth of the Tobique Reel; 2008 (Sony BMG)
- Thomas Dolby: Amerikana EP, Songs:Toad Lickers and 17 Hills, 2010 (Lost Toy People, Inc)
