= Fit as a Fiddle (album) =

Album by Natalie MacMaster

Studio album by Natalie MacMaster
- Released: 1993
- Studio: CBC Studio H, Halifax, Nova Scotia
- Genre: Celtic
- Length: 53:42
- Label: Rounder Records
- Producer: Glenn Meisner and Dave MacIsaac

Natalie MacMaster chronology
Road to the Isle	Fit as a Fiddle	A Compilation

Professional ratings
Review scores
Source	Rating
AllMusic	3/5 stars

Fit as a Fiddle is an album by Natalie MacMaster. It was reissued by Rounder Records in 1997.

== Production ==
The album was produced at CBC's Studio H.

== Critical reception ==
The Washington Post called the album "a straightforward collection of traditional Celtic fiddle tunes performed with undeniable flair and simple accompaniment."

== Track listing ==
1. "Strathspeys & Reels" – 4:20
  - "John Campbell's" (strathspey)
  - "Miss Ann Moir's Birthday" (strathspey)
  - "Lady Georgina Campbell" (reel)
  - "Angus on the Turnpike" (reel)
  - "Sheehan’s Reel" (reel)
2. "Jigs" – 3:07
  - "My Dungannon Sweetheart" (jig)
  - "Scaffies Cairet" (jig)
  - "Juniper Jig" (jig)
3. "March, Strathspeys & Reels" – 6:48
  - "Carnival March" (march)
  - "Miller of Drone" (strathspey)
  - "MacKinnon's Brook" (strathspey)
  - "Lucy Campbell" (strathspey)
  - "Annie is My Darling" (reel)
  - "Gordon Cote" (reel)
  - "Bird's Nest" (reel)
  - "Maid Behind the Bar" (reel)
4. "Waltz" – 2:25
  - "Nancy's Waltz" (waltz)
5. "Hornpipe & Reels" – 3:45
  - "Compliments to Sean Maguire" (hornpipe)
  - "President Garfield" (reel)
  - "Miss Watt" (reel)
  - "Casa Loma Castle" (reel)
6. "Air, Strathspeys & Reels" – 7:14
  - "O'r the Moor Among the Heather" (air)
  - Traditional (strathspey)
  - "Lady Mary Ramsay" (strathspey)
  - "Jenny Dang the Weaver" (reel)
  - "The Lassies of Stewarton" (reel)
  - "Garfield Vale" (reel)
7. "Reel" – 3:07
  - "Jean's Reel" (reel)
8. "Air" – 4:20
  - "I'll Always Remember You" (air)
9. "Reels" – 4:04
  - "The Girls at Martinfield" (reel)
  - "Bennett's Favorite" (reel)
  - "The Green Fields of Glentown" (reel)
10. "Jigs" – 3:06
  - "Counselor's" (jig)
  - "The Rakes of Kildare" (jig)
  - "The Lark in the Morning" (jig)
11. "Strathspeys & Reels" – 4:18
  - "The Lass of Carrie Mills" (strathspey)
  - "Lennox's Love to Blantyre" (strathspey)
  - "Archie Menzies" (reel)
  - "Reichwall Forest" (reel)
12. "Air" – 3:55
  - "If Ever You Were Mine" (air)
13. "Jig & Reels" – 3:13
  - "The MacNeils of Ugdale" (jig)
  - "MacLaine of Loch Buie" (reel)
  - "Colville's Rant" (reel)
  - "Pibroch O'Donal Dhu" (reel)

== Personnel ==
- Natalie MacMaster – fiddle, piano (track 10), step dancing (track 7)
- David MacIsaac – acoustic and electric guitar, bass
- Howie MacDonald – piano (tracks 1, 2, 3 and 11)
- Tracey Dares – piano and synth (tracks 4, 6, 7, 9, 12 and 13)
- Tom Roach – drums and percussion
- Jamie MacInnis – highland pipes
- Sandy Moore – Celtic harp
