= Aestuarium =

Scientific classification
- Domain: Bacteria
- Kingdom: Pseudomonadati
- Phylum: Pseudomonadota
- Class: Alphaproteobacteria
- Order: Rhodobacterales
- Family: Rhodobacteraceae
- Genus: Aestuarium; Yu et al. 2019

Type species
- Aestuarium zhoushanense

Species
- A. zhoushanense

Genus of bacteria

Aestuarium is a Gram-negative, aerobic and non-motile bacterial genus from the family of Rhodobacteraceae with on known species (Aestuarium zhoushanense). Aestuarium zhoushanense has been isolated from a sample of tidal flat from the East China Sea in Zhoushan.
