= Eyvind Kang =

American musician (born 1971)

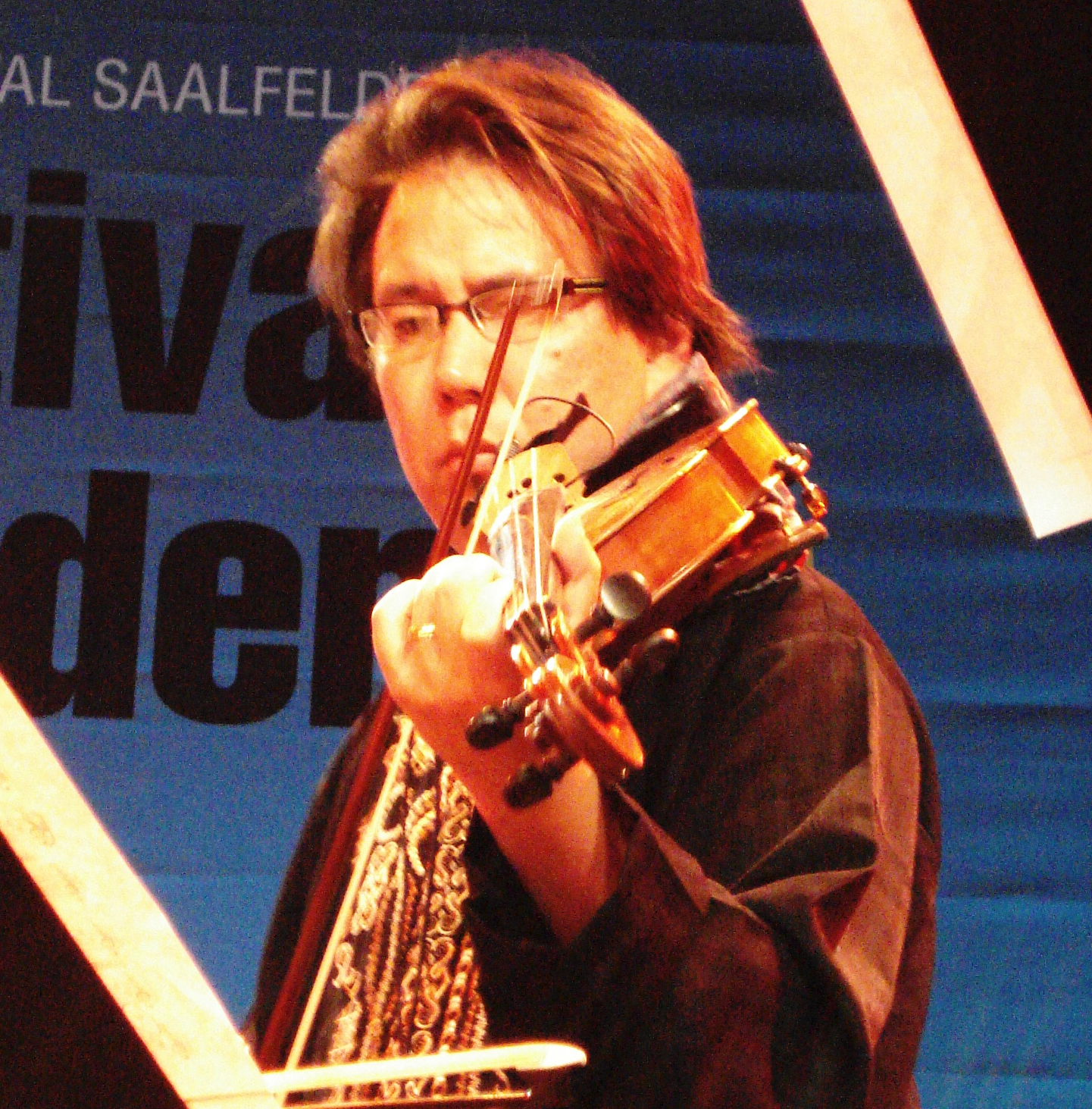
- Eyvind Kang live with Rova: Orchestrova's Electric Ascension in Saalfelden, 2009. (Photo by Davide Leonardi)

Background information
- Born: 23 June 1971 (age 54); Corvallis, Oregon
- Origin: United States
- Genres: Experimental rock; jazz rock; classical rock
- Occupations: Musician, composer, educator
- Instruments: Viola; violin; bass guitar
- Website: ipecac.com/artists/eyvind_kang

Eyvindur Y. Kang (born 23 June 1971) is an American composer and multi-instrumentalist. His primary instrument is viola, but has also performed on violin, tuba, keyboards and others.

In addition to his solo work, Kang has worked extensively with Bill Frisell and John Zorn. His wife and musical partner is vocalist Jessika Kenney.

== Biography ==
Eyvindur Y. Kang was born 23 June 1971 in Corvallis, Oregon, United States. Kang says his family heritage is "a mixture of Icelandic, Danish and Korean." His mother is the Icelandic-Canadian scholar and writer Kristjana Gunnars. He was raised in Canada, Iceland, and the United States, and has since lived and worked in countries ranging from Italy to Iceland. He studied piano and violin as a child, and as a teen played bass guitar in a reggae band.

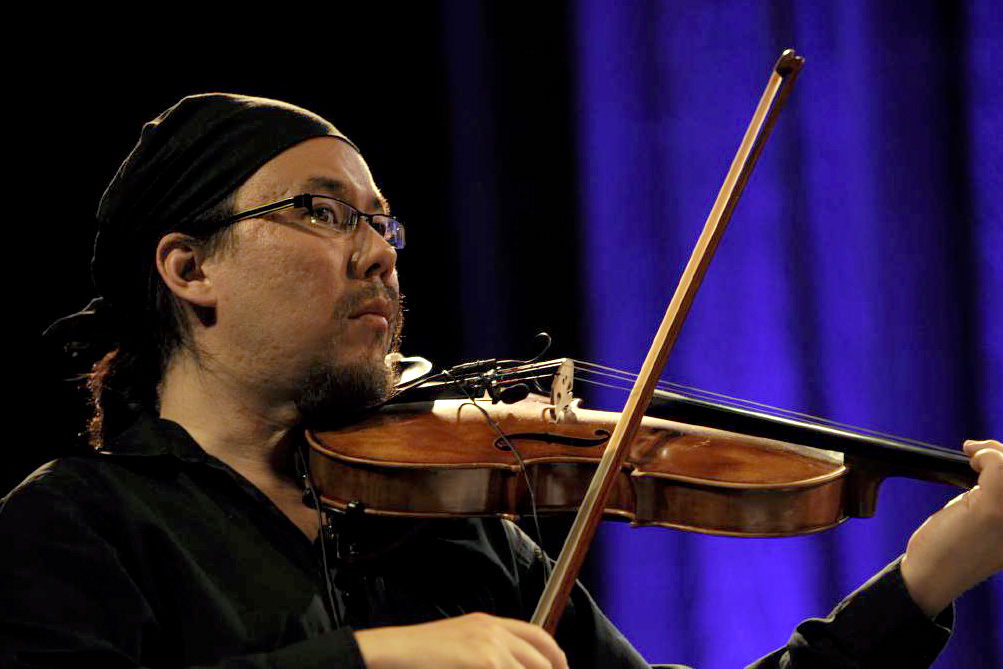
Eyvind Kang, moers festival 2010

A recurring theme in his solo work is the "NADE", the meaning of which Kang is not willing to disclose. Referring titles include "Theme from the first NADE", "5th NADE/Invisible Man", "Theme from the sixth NADE" (all three from the debut album 7 NADEs, 1996); "Jewel of the NADE", "Mystic NADE" (both from Theater of Mineral NADEs, 1998) and "Harbour of the NADE" (Virginal Co-ordinates, 2003). His preferred instrument is the viola.

In 2014 Kang visited Vossajazz in western Norway, for a gig with Bill Frisell's trio Beautiful Dreamers, including drummer Rudy Royston, for the opening concert. During the concert Norwegian trumpeter Arve Henriksen joined in for a tune.

== Discography ==
=== Solo albums ===
- 1996: Sweetness of Sickness (RGI Industries)
- 1996: 7 NADEs (Tzadik)
- 1998: Theater of Mineral NADEs (Tzadik)
- 2000: The Story of Iceland (Tzadik)
- 2002: Live Low To The Earth, In The Iron Age (Abduction)
- 2003: Virginal Co Ordinates (Ipecac)
- 2007: Athlantis (Ipecac)
- 2007: The Yelm Sessions (Tzadik)
- 2011: Visible Breath (Ideologic Organ)
- 2012: The Narrow Garden (Ipecac)
- 2012: Grass (Tzadik)
- 2019: Chirality (I dischi di angelica)
- 2020: Ajaeng Ajaeng
- 2021: Sonic Gnostic
- 2025: Riparian (Kŏu Records)

=== Collaborations ===
With Joe McPhee

- 1996: Common Threads (Deep Listening)

With Bill Frisell

- 1996: Quartet (Nonesuch)
- 2004: Unspeakable (Nonesuch)
- 2005: Richter 858 (Songlines)
- 2007: Floratone (Blue Note) with Floratone
- 2008: History, Mystery (Nonesuch)
- 2010: Beautiful Dreamers (Savoy)
- 2010: Sign of Life: Music for 858 Quartet (Savoy Jazz)
- 2012: Floratone II (Savoy Jazz) with Floratone
- 2013: Big Sur (OKeh)
- 2016: When You Wish Upon a Star (Okeh)

With Wayne Horvitz

- 1998: 4+1 Ensemble (Intuition)
- 2001: From a Window (Avant)

With Dying Ground

- 1998: Dying Ground - Live at the Knitting Factory (Avant)

With Secret Chiefs 3

- 1998: Second Grand Constitution and Bylaws: Hurqalya (Amarillo)
- 1999: Eyes of Flesh, Eyes of Flame (Mimicry)
- 2001: Book M (Mimicry)
- 2004: Book of Horizons (Mimicry)

With Dylan van der Schyff and François Houle

- 1999: Pieces of Time (Line 4/Spool)

With Mr. Bungle

- 1999: California (Warner Bros.)

With Michael Bisio

- 2000: MBEK (Meniscus)

With Amir Koushkani

- 2001: In the Path of Love (Golbarg)

With Skúli Sverrisson & Hilmar Jensson

- 2002: Napoli 23 (Smekkleysa)

With Tucker Martine

- 2004: Orchestra Dim Bridges (Conduit)

With Billy Martin & Socket

- 2005: January 14 & 15, 2005 (Amulet)

With Jessika Kenney

- 2005: Aestuarium (Endless)
- 2012: The Face of the Earth (Ideologic Organ)
- 2016: Reverse Tree

With John Zorn

- 2014: Alastor: Book of Angels Volume 21 (Tzadik)

With Jessika Kenney and Hyeonhee Park

- 2014: At Temple Gate (Weyrd Son Records)

=== Guest appearances ===
- String arrangements for Blonde Redhead - Misery Is a Butterfly (2004)
- Animal Collective - Feels (2005)
- Alvarius B - "Blood Operatives of the Barium Sunset"(2005)
- various projects with Bill Frisell's Quartet
- various projects with Sun City Girls
- The Decemberists - The Crane Wife (2006)
- Sunn O))) & Boris - Altar (2006) - Songs "The Sinking Belle (Black Sheep)", "The Sinking Belle (White Sheep)"
- Thilges - "La Double Absence" (2007)
- Sunn O))) - Monoliths & Dimensions
- Six Organs Of Admittance - Luminous Night(2009)
- Rahim AlHaj "Fly Away" (2010)
- Alvarius B - "Baroque Primitiva"(2011)
- Ensemble Pearl - "Ensemble Pearl" (2013)
- The Invisible Hands - "Teslam" (2014)
