= Tori Sparks =

American singer-songwriter (born 1983)

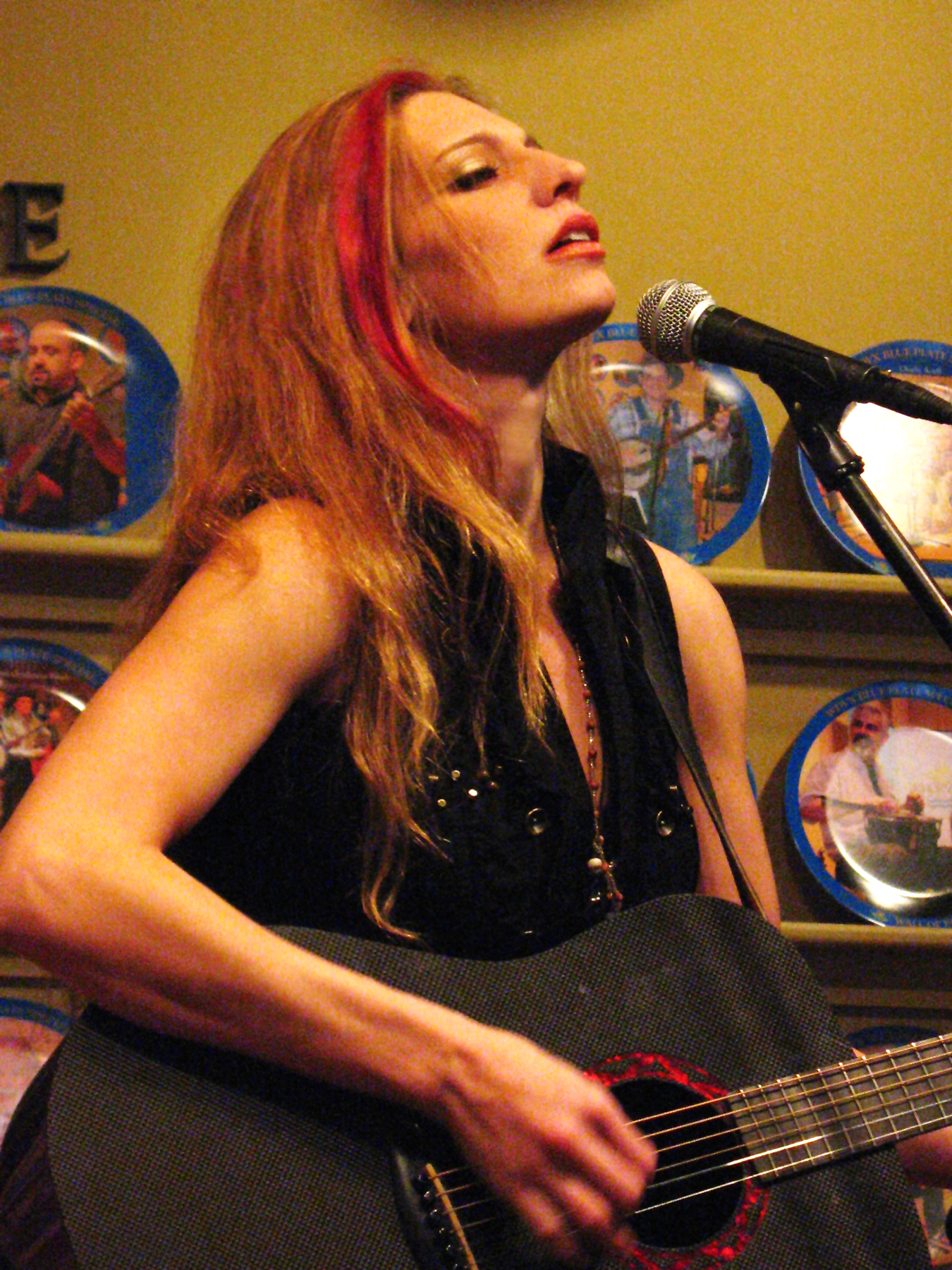
- Tori Sparks on the WDVX Blue Plate Special (Knoxville, TN)

Background information
- Born: 1983 (age 42–43); Chicago, US
- Genres: Alternative; Rock; Blues; Soul; Jazz; Americana; Folk; Flamenco Fusion; World
- Occupations: Singer-songwriter; Producer; Entrepreneur
- Instruments: Vocals; Guitar
- Years active: 2004–present
- Labels: Glass Mountain Records; Platinum Plus Universal
- Website: torisparks.com

Tori Sparks (born December 5, 1983) is an American singer-songwriter based in Barcelona, Spain, having relocated from Nashville, TN. Her musical style is a fusion of rock, blues, and American roots music with flamenco.

== Discography ==
=== Albums and EPs ===
Year	Album	Label
2004	Tidewaters EP	Self-Released
2005	Rivers+Roads	Platinum Plus Universal Records
2007	Little Stories EP	Glass Mountain Records
2007	Under This Yellow Sun	Glass Mountain Records
2009	The Scorpion in the Story	Glass Mountain Records
2011	Until Morning/Come Out of the Dark	Glass Mountain Records
2014	El Mar	Glass Mountain Records
2019	Wait No More (Live)	Glass Mountain Records
2020	“The Man Who Sold the World” Single	Glass Mountain Records
2022	El Mar Electric EP	Glass Mountain Records

=== Vinyl ===
Year	Album	Label
2011	Until Morning/Come Out of the Dark	Glass Mountain Records
2015	"Everybody Knows/La Llorona" Single	Glass Mountain Records
2017	La Huerta	Glass Mountain Records
2019	Wait No More	Glass Mountain Records
2021	El Mar (RSD Special Edition)	Glass Mountain Records

=== Videos ===
Year	Video	Label
2005	“Rivers + Roads” Music Video	Platinum Plus Universal Records
2007	Behind The Scenes: Screen Printing Madness with Tori Sparks	Glass Mountain Records
2007	Tori Sparks with Producer David Henry: The Making of Under This Yellow Sun	Glass Mountain Records
2007	"Cold War" Music Video	Glass Mountain Records
2009	"Merry Go-Round" Music Video	Glass Mountain Records
2009	"Live at The Rutledge” Full Concert DVD	Glass Mountain Records
2011	"Mama" Music Video	Glass Mountain Records
2013	"Leaving Side of Love" Live Video	Glass Mountain Records
2013	"La Llorona" Live Video	Glass Mountain Records
2013	"Sinner's Shoes" Live Video	Glass Mountain Records
2014	"Everybody Knows" Music Video	Glass Mountain Records
2017	"Wade in the Water" Music Video	Glass Mountain Records
2017	"Nature Boy" Music Video	Glass Mountain Records
2017	"Kashmir" Live Video	Glass Mountain Records
2017	"La Huerta" Live Video	Glass Mountain Records
2017	"La Leyenda del Tiempo" Live Video	Glass Mountain Records
2018	"La Flor de Estambul” Live Video	Glass Mountain Records
2018	"Wait No More” Live Video	Glass Mountain Records
2019	“Mama” Live Video	Glass Mountain Records
2020	“The Man Who Sold the World” Music Video	Glass Mountain Records
2022	“Until Morning” (El Mar Electric) Live Video	Glass Mountain Records
2022	“Bitter Seeds” (El Mar Electric) Live Video	Glass Mountain Records
2022	“Wade in the Water” (El Mar Electric) Live Video	Glass Mountain Records
2022	“Veinte Años” (El Mar Electric) Live Video	Glass Mountain Records
2022	“Verde” (El Mar Electric) Live Video	Glass Mountain Records

=== Singles ===
Year	Song (Album)	Label
2005	"Trouble" (Rivers + Roads)	Platinum Plus Universal Records
2005	"Rivers+Roads" (Rivers + Roads)	Platinum Plus Universal Records
2007	"Cold War" (Under This Yellow Sun)	Glass Mountain Records
2007	"Hope for Me" (Christmas Single Release Only)	Glass Mountain Records
2009	"Tall Towers" (The Scorpion in the Story)	Glass Mountain Records
2009	"Little Wrecking Ball" (The Scorpion in the Story)	Glass Mountain Records
2011	"Letter to a Wretch #2” (Until Morning/Come Out of the Dark)	Glass Mountain Records
2011	“Mama" (Until Morning/Come Out of the Dark)	Glass Mountain Records
2015	"Everybody Knows/La Llorona” (Single release only)	Glass Mountain Records
2017	"Nature Boy" (La Huerta)	Glass Mountain Records
2019	"La Flor de Estambul" (Wait No More)	Glass Mountain Records
2019	"Wait No More" (Wait No More)	Glass Mountain Records
2019	"Mama" (Wait No More)	Glass Mountain Records
2020	“The Man Who Sold the World” (Single release only)	Glass Mountain Records
2022	“Until Morning” (El Mar Electric)	Glass Mountain Records
2022	“Bitter Seeds” (El Mar Electric)	Glass Mountain Records
2022	“Wade in the Water” (El Mar Electric)	Glass Mountain Records
2022	“Veinte Años” (El Mar Electric)	Glass Mountain Records
2022	“Verde” (El Mar Electric)	Glass Mountain Records

=== Compilations ===
- Sin City Sampler: Volume 13 (Sin City Media, 2010)
- Dewey Beach Music Fest Sampler (DBMF, 2009)
- Paste Magazine New Music Sampler #54 (GoGirls Music, 2009)
- Paste Magazine New Music Sampler #54 (Paste Media Group, 2009)
- Project Cure Compilation 2008 (Project Cure, 2008)
- Paste Magazine New Music Sampler (Paste Media Group, 2008)
- Country Vol. 2 (double-disc) (Universal Music France, 2008)
- Moozikoo Best of Indies (Digital Release Only) (Moozikoo.com, 2008)
- KSYM-FM Camp Victory Compilation for the Troops (SCOOP KSYM-FM, 2007)
- MSMF Multiple Sclerosis Music Fest 2006 Compilation CD (Montel Williams MS Foundation, 2006)
- Canadian Music Week Best Unsigned Artists of 2006 (Tunetank, 2006)
- A Taste of Triple A #16 Compilation (A Taste of Triple A, 2006)
- World Music From Catalonia 2015 (Creative Catalonia/Government of Catalonia, 2015)
- Beautiful Cover Versions (Gülbahar Kültür, 2016)
- World Music From Catalonia 2017 (Creative Catalonia/Government of Catalonia, 2017)
- Toca no Meu Nariz (MIMS/Nariz Vermelho, 2018)
- Love in a Time of Quarantine (Glass Mountain Records, 2020)
