= My Roots Are Showing =

Studio album by Natalie MacMaster
- Released: 1998
- Genre: Celtic
- Label: Rounder

Natalie MacMaster chronology
| In My Hands (1999) | My Roots Are Showing (1998) | Live (2002) |

Professional ratings
Review scores
| Source | Rating |
|---|---|
| AllMusic | 4.5/5 stars |

My Roots Are Showing is an album by Natalie MacMaster, released in 1998 on the Rounder Records label. The title is word play, as the phrase is most often regarded when discussing hair color.

== Track listing ==
1. "Hey Johnny Cope! /March: Johnny Cope/Reels: the Dowd's Favorite/Pares" – 5:38
2. "Willie Fraser/ Strathspeys: Willie Fraser/Thomas MacDonnell's/ ..." – 4:15
3. "The Boys of the Lake/ Jigs: the Detroit Jig/The Mucking of Geordie's Byre" – 3:06
4. "The Wildcate: the Wildcat/Little Nipper's Hornpipe" – 2:14
5. "Balmoral Highlanders/ Pipe March: The Balmoral Highlanders/ Strathspey" – 7:37
6. "The Shakin's O' the Pocky" – 2:20
7. "Captain Keeler/ Hornpipes: Miss Wharton Duff/Jimmy Linn's Hornpipe" – 5:12
8. "E Flat Set: the E Flat Reel/The Recluse/James D. Law" – 3:08
9. "Glad You Made It, Howie!: Mary Scott/The Ewie Wi' The Crookit Horn/Lor" – 6:39
10. "Close to the Floor/ Jigs: Scotty Fitzgerald's Jig/Close to the Floor" – 3:07
11. "Queen of the West/ Hornpipes: Ferry Bridge Clog/Queen of the ..." – 5:54
12. "A' Chuthag (The Cuckoo)" – 2:34
13. "A Glencoe Dance Set: the Castle Hornpipe/Sean Maguire's ..." – 5:49
