= The Yelm Sessions =

Studio album by Eyvind Kang
- Released: 2007
- Genre: Jazz, Contemporary classical music
- Length: 42:52
- Label: Tzadik TZ 8042
- Producer: Eyvind Kang

Eyvind Kang chronology
Athlantis (2007)	The Yelm Sessions (2007)	Visible Breath (2012)

The Yelm Sessions is an album by violinist/multi-instrumentalist Eyvind Kang which was released in 2007 on John Zorn's Tzadik Records as part of the Composer Series.

== Reception ==
Professional ratings
Review scores
Source	Rating
Allmusic	4/5 stars

Allmusic music critic Stephen Eddins wrote "The pastel-colored title track, "The Yelm Sessions", and the pop-sounding Latin dance "Enter the Garden" are lovely, but are a far cry from the dark power characteristic of his most exciting work. The fourth track, though, "Fire in Wind", for orchestra, keyboards, guitar, electric bass, and percussion, inhabits the fearsome soundworld of Kang's more unsettling work, and most of the remaining pieces lead the listener through a number of dark, disturbing places."

== Track listing ==
All compositions by Eyvind Kang except as indicated

1. "The Clown's Song" - 2:35
2. "Enter the Garden" - 4:31
3. "The Yelm Sessions" - 2:47
4. "Fire in Wind" - 3:46
5. "Locus iste" (Anton Bruckner) - 0:52
6. "Sulpicia Variation" - 2:34
7. "Hawks Prairie" - 6:59
8. "Hiemarmene" - 2:45
9. "Mistress Mine" - 2:11
10. "Asa Tru" - 7:41
11. "Epoché for Strings" (Johann Sebastian Bach) - 6:11

== Personnel ==
- Eyvind Kang - violin, viola, cello, bass, guitar, sitar, drums, keyboards, trumpet, recorder, bird ambience
- Hans Teuber - bass clarinet, clarinet, flute (track 7)
- Doug Wieselman - bass clarinet (track 6)
- Steve Moore - trombone (tracks 3, 8 & 9)
- Barbara Fasching - English horn (tracks 5 & 7)
- Taina Karr - English horn, oboe, oboe d'amore (tracks 6 & 7)
- Nikolaus Vogelhofer - French horn (tracks 5 & 7)
- Wolfgang Heiler - bassoon (tracks 5 & 7)
- Marco Dalpane - keyboards (track 4)
- Walter Zanetti - guitar (track 4)
- Kala Ramnath - violin (track 10)
- Gretchen Yanover - cello (track 11)
- Scott Schaafsma - double bass (track 6)
- Thilges 3 - programming (track 5)
- Mell Dettmer - rain ambience, Echoplex, Korg MS 20 (tracks 1, 5, 7 & 11)
- Shahzad Ismaily - drums (track 11)
- Don McGreevy - drums, percussion (Tracks 3 & 7)
- Dave Abramson - percussion (track 6)
- Matt Chamberlain - hand drums, gongs (track 4)
- Madeleine Sosin - quijara de burro (track 2)
- Jessika Kenney - voice (tracks 2 & 9)
- Degenerate Art Orchestra conducted by Joshua Kohl (track 2)
- Orchestra del Teatro Communale di Bologna conducted by Aldo Sisillo (track 4)
