= A Compilation (Natalie MacMaster album) =

Compilation album by Natalie MacMaster
- Released: February 10, 1998
- Genre: Celtic
- Length: 68:30
- Label: Rounder

Natalie MacMaster chronology
Fit as a Fiddle (1997)	A Compilation (1998)	No Boundaries (1997)

Professional ratings
Review scores
Source	Rating
Allmusic	4.5/5 stars

A Compilation, an album by Natalie MacMaster, was released in 1998 on the Rounder Records label. It consists of 16 tracks, compiled by Paul MacDonald, from MacMaster's first two albums, Four on the Floor and Road to the Isle. The album's total running time is 68:30.

== Track listing ==
Source: Allmusic

No.	Title	Movements and type	Length
1.	"Spey in Spate"	Spey in Spate (reel); The Forth Bridge (reel); The Fox Hunter (reel)	2:28
2.	"Mountain Road"	The Earl of Dalhousies Happy Return to Scotland (march); Back of the Change House (strathspey); Bob Steele's(reel); Mountain Road (reel)	4:43
3.	"Mahone Bay Jig"	Mahone Bay Jig (jig); Oh Dear What Can The Matter Be (jig); Traditional (jig); Fraser's (jig)	4:25
4.	"Amelia's Waltz"	Amelia's Waltz (waltz); The Fir Tree (strathspey); Athole Brose (strathspey); The Pondville (reel)	5:42
5.	"Happy Go Lucky"	Happy Go Lucky (clog); Fred Wilson's (clog); Fisher's (hornpipe); Carnie's Canter (reel); Saratiga (reel)	5:51
6.	"King of the Clans"	Traditional (strathspey); King of the Clans (reel); Johnny's Made a Wedding O'T (reel); Cameron's One Legged Hen (reel)	3:01
7.	"Buttermilk Mary Jigs"	Traditional (jig); Cronin's Favorite (jig); Buttermilk Mary (jig)	3:02
8.	"The Kings Set"	The Headlands (march); Captain Campbell (strathspey); Callum Breugach (strathspey); King George (strathspey); O'er the Isles to America (reel); Sandy Cameron (reel); Kings (reel); The Cape Breton Fiddler's Welcome to Shetland (reel)	7:18
9.	"Newcastle Hornpipes"	Newcastle (hornpipe); The Second Star (hornpipe); Mrs. Forbes Leith (reel); Mary Claire (reel); Jabe Meadow (reel)	5:02
10.	"One for the Record"	The Evesdropper (jig); The Knights of St. Patrick (jig); One for the Record (jig); Shandon Bells (jig)	4:03
11.	"Road to the Isle"	Road to the Isle (march); Scourdiness (reel); Homeword Bound (reel)	4:01
12.	"Capers Jigs"	Doug MacPhee's Visit (jig); Traditional (jig); Short Grass (jig)	2:59
13.	"Blackberry Blossom"	Blackberry Blossom (reel); The Red Haired Lass (reel); Paddy O'Brien's (reel); The Dawn (reel)	3:41
14.	"A Buddy Jig"	Jimmy's (jig); A Buddy MacMaster Jig (jig); Connaughtman's Rambles (jig)	3:00
15.	"Glen of Thickets"	Airidh nam badam (Glen of Thickets) (Gaelic air)	3:10
16.	"Johnny Wilmot's Fiddles"	To Daun't on Me (march); Cameron Chisholm's (strathspey); Hughs of Cromdale (strathspey); Johnny Wilmot's Fiddles (reel); Mrs. Kennedy of Greenan (reel); Fermoy Lasses (reel)	6:04
