= Monheim Triennale =

International music festival

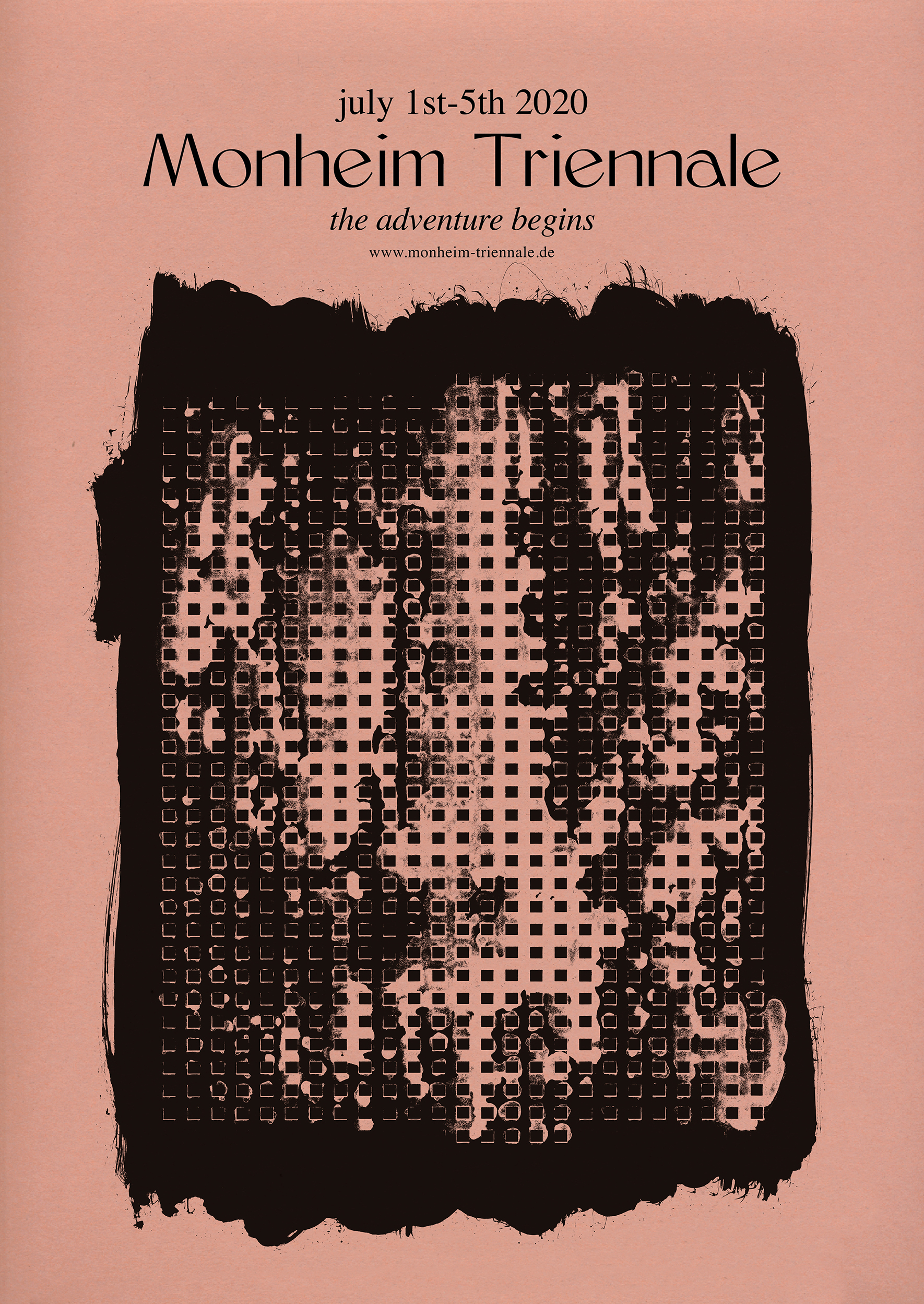
Monheim Triennale 2020 poster design — © Vasilis Marmatakis

The "Monheim Triennale" is an international music festival that aims to document pioneering artistic positions in contemporary music. It is to take place every three years starting in 2023 at the "Kulturraffinerie K714", an industrial monument located directly on the Rhine, which will then be converted into an event venue. In 2020, the first edition of the festival will be held in several venues along the Rhine. The artistic director is Reiner Michalke, who was artistic director of the Moers Festival from 2006 to 2016 and is now programme director at the Stadtgarten in Cologne.

== History ==
After a one-year planning phase, the city council of Monheim am Rhein unanimously decided on 10 October 2018 to hold the Monheim Triennale. The first edition will be held from 1 to 5 July 2020 in various venues such as the not yet completed industrial hall "Kulturraffinerie K714", the socio-cultural centre "Sojus 7", the Marienkapelle, the new event ship of KD - the MS Rhein Galaxie - and the Deusser Garten. In February 2019, a five-member board of trustees was appointed to jointly select the artists for the first edition. Among them are performance artist and professor for aesthetic practices Swantje Lichtenstein from Düsseldorf, music curator Louis Rastig from Berlin, Managing Artistic Director Rainbow Robert from Vancouver, Creative & Brand Consultant Meghan Stabile from New York City and music journalist and co-editor of Kaput magazine for Insolvency & Pop Thomas Venker from Cologne.

=== Artist in Residence ===
At the beginning of 2019, Reiner Michalke called the musician Achim Tang to Monheim am Rhein to convey the festival content. Tang has already worked for Michalke as Improviser in Residence at the Moers Festival in 2011.

=== Festival Design ===
The festival design of the Monheim Triennale was created by the Greek graphic artist Vasilis Marmatakis. Marmatakis created the graphic design for Yorgos Lanthimos' films "The Lobster" (2015), "The Killing of a Sacred Deer" (2017), "The Favourite" (2018) and "Nimic" (2019), among others. The design concept is based on the visualization of physical and typographic elements through the experience of sound. Vasilis Marmatakis has designed a series of images with patterns like those found on "Mesh Covers" - patterns of perforated fabric or metal used to cover loudspeakers. He transfers these onto solid material and then works them with ink. The resulting traces visualize the acoustic resonance between source and receiver.
