= Bill Frisell discography =

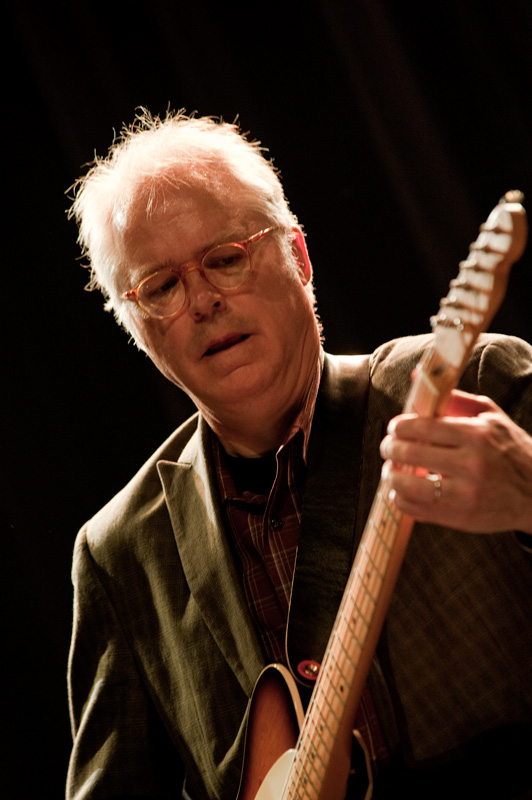
- Frisell performing at the Moers Festival in 2010
- Studio albums: 42
- Live albums: 4
- Compilation albums: 4
- Live Download Series: 22
- Collaboration albums: 22

This discography features albums released by American jazz guitarist Bill Frisell (born 1951), released recordings of bands and projects he was/is a member of, and albums on which he appears as guest musician. Labels and dates indicate first release.

== Albums ==
=== Albums ===
Title	Year	Label
In Line	1983	ECM
Rambler	1985	ECM
Lookout for Hope	1988	ECM
Before We Were Born	1989	Nonesuch
Is That You?	1990	Nonesuch
Where in the World?	1991	Nonesuch
Have a Little Faith	1992	Nonesuch
This Land	1994	Nonesuch
Go West: Music for the Films of Buster Keaton	1995	Nonesuch
The High Sign/One Week: Music for the Films of Buster Keaton	1995	Nonesuch
Live	1995	Gramavision
Quartet	1996	Nonesuch
Nashville	1997	Nonesuch
Gone, Just Like a Train	1998	Nonesuch
Good Dog, Happy Man	1999	Nonesuch
The Sweetest Punch	1999	Decca
Ghost Town	2000	Nonesuch
Blues Dream	2001	Nonesuch
With Dave Holland and Elvin Jones	2001	Nonesuch
The Willies	2002	Nonesuch
The Intercontinentals	2003	Nonesuch
Unspeakable	2004	Nonesuch
Richter 858	2005	Songlines
East/West	2005	Nonesuch
Further East / Further West (only available as a digital download)	2005	Nonesuch
Bill Frisell, Ron Carter, Paul Motian	2006	Nonesuch
Bill Frisell, Ron Carter, Paul Motian EP (only available as a digital download)	2006	Nonesuch
History, Mystery	2008	Nonesuch
Disfarmer	2009	Nonesuch
Beautiful Dreamers	2010	Savoy
Sign of Life: Music for 858 Quartet	2011	Savoy
All We Are Saying	2011	Savoy
Hunter S. Thompson – The Kentucky Derby Is Decadent and Depraved	2012	429/Paris
Silent Comedy	2013	Tzadik
Big Sur	2013	OKeh
Guitar in the Space Age!	2014	OKeh
When You Wish Upon a Star	2016	OKeh
Alfie / I Love Lucy (limited 7 inch vinyl single)	2016	OKeh
Small Town (with Thomas Morgan)	2016	ECM
Music IS	2018	OKeh
Epistrophy (with Thomas Morgan)	2019	ECM
Harmony	2019	Blue Note
Valentine	2020	Blue Note
Four	2022	Blue Note
Orchestras	2024	Blue Note
In My Dreams	2026	Blue Note

=== Live Download Series ===
The series is produced as a subsidiary label of Lee Townsend's Songline/Tone Field, and distributed online as lossless FLAC, MP3 and AAC files with printable cover art.

Title	Year
#001 Live in Bochum, Germany – May 22, 2004	2008
#002 Live in San Francisco, CA – March 16, 2007	2009
#003 Live in San Francisco, CA – February 5, 2005, Set 2	2009
#004 Live in New York, NY – May 1, 2004, Set 3	2009
#005 Live in London, UK – November 15, 2005	2009
#006 Live in Boulder, CO – November 5, 2003	2009
#007 Live in Seattle, WA – February 21, 2006	2009
#008 Live in New York, NY – September 26, 1996, Set 1	2010
#009 Live in New York, NY – October 12, 1992	2010
#010 Live in Oakland, CA – July 15, 1989	2010
#011 Live in Budapest, Hungary – March 29, 2003	2010
#012 Live in Seattle, WA – July 16, 2002	2010
#013 Live in Tokyo, Japan – July 21, 2000	2010
#014 Live in Chapel Hill, NC – March 22, 2009	2011
#015 Live in Seattle, WA – August 6, 2011, Set 2	2011
#016 Live in Florence, Italy – February 10, 1993	2012
#017 Live in Portland, OR – February 25, 2012	2012
#018 Live in Köln, Germany – March 27, 1995	2013
#019 Live in Santa Monica, CA – January 10, 1998, Set 2	2014
#020 Live in Austin, TX – March 8, 2015	2015
#021 Live in California – April 11, 2010 – April 13, 2010	2015
#022 Hurricane Harvey Relief (download series compilation)	2017

== Compilations ==
- Works (ECM, 1988)
- A-Collection (WEA, 2000)
- Rarum: Selected Recordings of Bill Frisell (ECM, 2002)
- The Best of Bill Frisell, Vol. 1 – Folk Songs (Nonesuch, 2009)

== Collaborations ==
- Theoretically with Tim Berne (Empire, 1984)
- Smash & Scatteration with Vernon Reid (Minor Music, 1985)
- Strange Meeting by Power Tools with Melvin Gibbs and Ronald Shannon Jackson (Antilles, 1987)
- Just So Happens with Gary Peacock (Postcards, 1994)
- American Blood/Safety in Numbers with Victor Bruce Godsey and Brian Ales (Intuition, 1995)
- Deep Dead Blue with Elvis Costello (Nonesuch, 1995)
- Time Again with Donald Rubinstein (Rhombus, 1997)
- Motion Pictures with Michael White (Intuition, 1997)
- Songs We Know with Fred Hersch (Nonesuch, 1998)
- Petra Haden and Bill Frisell with Petra Haden (True North, 2003)
- The Elephant Sleeps But Still Remembers with Jack DeJohnette (Golden Beams, 2006)
- Floratone with Matt Chamberlain, Lee Townsend, and Tucker Martine (Blue Note, 2007)
- Hemispheres with Jim Hall (ArtistShare, 2008)
- Floratone II with Matt Chamberlain, Lee Townsend, and Tucker Martine (Savoy, 2012)
- Lágrimas Mexicanas with Vinicius Cantuária (Naïve, 2011)
- Enfants Terribles with Lee Konitz, Gary Peacock, and Joey Baron (Half Note, 2012)
- Strata with Skúli Sverrisson (Newvelle, 2018)
- More Than Enough with Gregory Tardy (Newvelle, 2019)
- Clock Face with Elvis Costello (Concord, 2020)
- Americana with Grégoire Maret and Romain Collin (ACT, 2020)
- Life Lessons with Dale Bruning and Tim O'Brien (Wendell World, 2021)
- Breaking the Shell with Kit Downes, Andrew Cyrille (Red Hook, 2024)
- Live Forever, Vol. 3: Wayne Horvitz, Bill Frisell Duo: Frankfurt, Knitting Factory 89–90, (Wayne Horvitz, 2024)

== With Paul Motian and Joe Lovano ==
All albums with Paul Motian are with saxophonist Joe Lovano, except as noted.

- Psalm with Ed Schuller and Billy Drewes (ECM, 1982)
- The Story of Maryam with Ed Schuller and Jim Pepper (Soul Note, 1984)
- Jack of Clubs with Ed Schuller and Jim Pepper (Soul Note, 1985)
- It Should've Happened a Long Time Ago (ECM, 1985)
- Misterioso with Ed Schuller and Jim Pepper (Soul Note, 1987)
- Monk in Motian with Geri Allen and Dewey Redman (JMT, 1988)
- On Broadway Volume 1 (JMT, 1989)
- One Time Out (Soul Note, 1989)
- On Broadway Volume 2 with Charlie Haden (JMT, 1989)
- Worlds with the Joe Lovano Wind Ensemble (Label Bleu, 1989)
- Bill Evans with Marc Johnson (JMT, 1990)
- Motian in Tokyo (JMT, 1991)
- On Broadway Volume 3 with Lee Konitz and Charlie Haden (JMT, 1991)
- Trioism (JMT, 1994)
- At the Village Vanguard (JMT, 1995)
- Sound of Love (Winter & Winter, 1997)
- I Have the Room Above Her (ECM, 2005)
- Time and Time Again (ECM, 2007)
- The Windmills of Your Mind with Petra Haden and Thomas Morgan w/o Lovano (Winter & Winter, 2011)

== With John Zorn ==
Albums mostly written and produced by Zorn, in part with Zorn playing alto saxophone (or other instruments), sometimes conducting the ensemble.

- The Big Gundown: John Zorn Plays the Music of Ennio Morricone (Elektra/Nonesuch, 1986)
- "Godard" on French compilation Godard ça vous chante? (Nato, 1986, Tzadik reissue on Godard/Spillane, 1999)
- Cobra (Hathut, 1987)
- Spillane (Elektra/Nonesuch, 1987)
- News for Lulu with George E. Lewis (Hathut, 1988)
- Filmworks VII: Cynical Hysterie Hour (CBS/Sony (Japan), 1989)
- More News for Lulu (Hathut, 1990)
- Filmworks 1986–1990 (Elektra Nonesuch, 1992)
- Filmworks III: 1990–1995 (Toys Factory, 1996)
- New Traditions in East Asian Bar Bands (Tzadik, 1997)
- Masada Guitars (Tzadik, 2003)
- Spinoza (Tzadik, 2022)
- Perchance to Dream (Tzadik, 2022)

With Naked City

- Naked City (Elektra Nonesuch, 1989)
- Torture Garden (Shimmy Disc, 1990)
- Grand Guignol (Avant, 1992)
- Leng Tch'e (Toys Factory, 1992)
- Heretic (Avant, 1992)
- Radio (Avant, 1993)
- Absinthe (Avant, 1993)
- Live, Vol. 1: The Knitting Factory 1989 (Tzadik, 2002)
- Complete Studio Recordings (compilation, Tzadik, 2005)

With the Gnostic Trio (with Carol Emmanuel, Kenny Wollesen)

- The Gnostic Preludes (Tzadik, 2012)
- The Mysteries (Tzadik, 2013)
- In Lambeth (Tzadik, 2013)
- The Testament of Solomon (Tzadik, 2014)
- Transmigration of the Magus (Tzadik, 2014)
- The Mockingbird (Tzadik, 2016)
- The Book Beri'ah, Vol. 7: Netzach (Tzadik, 2019)
- Gnosis: The Inner Light (Tzadik, 2021)

With Julian Lage & Gyan Riley

- Nove cantici per Francesco d'Assisi (Tzadik, 2019)
- Virtue (Tzadik, 2020)
- Teresa de Avila (Tzadik, 2021)
- Parables (Tzadik, 2021)
- A Garden of Forking Paths (Tzadik, 2021)
- Nothing Is as Real as Nothing (Tzadik, 2023)
- Lamentations (Tzadik, 2024)

== Albums featured ==
Leading artist and/or band	Album	Year	Label	Notes
Michel Herr, Bill Frisell, Vinton Johnson, Kermit Driscoll	Good Buddies	1978	EMI Belgium	
Eberhard Weber	Fluid Rustle	1979	ECM	
Chris Massey Group	Atmosphere	1981	Willow Records	
Emil Viklický, Bill Frisell, Kermit Driscoll, Vinton Johnson	Okno	1981	Supraphon	reissued as Okno & Dveře / Door & Window on Bonton in 1997
Various	Amarcord Nino Rota: Interpretations of Nino Rota's Music from the Films of Federico Fellini	1981	Hannibal	Hal Willner production
Arild Andersen	A Molde Concert	1982	ECM	
Jan Garbarek	Paths, Prints	1982	ECM	
Mike Metheny	Blue Jay Sessions	1982	Headfirst	
Eberhard Weber	Later That Evening	1982	ECM	
Jan Garbarek	Wayfarer	1983	ECM	
Bob Moses	When Elephants Dream of Music	1983	Gramavision	
Jim Pepper	Comin' and Goin'	1983	Europa	
Bob Moses	Visit with the Great Spirit	1984	Gramavision	
Jukkis Uotila	Introspection	1984	Polydor/Fnac	
Gunter Hampel	Fresh Heat: Live at Sweet Basil	1985	Birth	
Billy Hart	Oshumare	1985	Gramavision	
Herb Robertson	Transparency	1985	JMT	
Leni Stern	Clairvoyant	1985	Passport	
Emil Viklický, Bill Frisell, Kermit Driscoll, Vinton Johnson	Dveře / Door	1985	Supraphon	reissued 1997 with Okno / Window on Bonton
Paul Bley	Fragments	1986	ECM	
Marc Johnson	Bass Desires	1986	ECM	
Lyle Mays	Lyle Mays	1986	Geffen	
Stefan F. Winter	The Little Trumpet	1986	JMT	
Tim Berne	Fulton Street Maul	1987	Columbia	
Paul Bley	The Paul Bley Quartet	1987	ECM	
Marianne Faithfull	Strange Weather	1987	Island	Hal Willner production
Wayne Horvitz	The President	1987	Dossier	
Marc Johnson's Bass Desires	Second Sight	1987	ECM	
Bob Moses	The Story of Moses	1987	Gramavision	
Hank Roberts	Black Pastels	1987	JMT	
Mathilde Santing	Out of This Dream: A Third Side	1987	Megadisc	Hal Willner production
Billy Hart	Rah	1988	Gramavision	
Julius Hemphill	Julius Hemphill Big Band	1988	Elektra/Musician	
Robin Holcomb	Todos Santos ... Play Robin Holcomb	1988	Sound Aspects	one half of the album with duos by Frisell and Doug Wieselman
Lyle Mays	Street Dreams	1988	Geffen	
Bobby Previte	Claude's Late Morning	1988	Gramavision	
Various	Stay Awake: Various Interpretations of Music from Vintage Disney Films	1988	A&M	Hal Willner production
Gavin Friday and Maurice Seezer	Each Man Kills the Thing He Loves	1989	Island	Hal Willner production
Allen Ginsberg	The Lion for Real	1989	Great Jones, Antilles	Hal Willner production
Caetano Veloso	Estrangeiro	1989	Philips	
Robin Holcomb	Robin Holcomb	1990	Elektra/Musician	
Gavin Bryars	After the Requiem	1991	ECM New Series	
Mike Gibbs	Big Music	1991	Venture	
Ryuichi Sakamoto	Heartbeat	1991	Virgin	
David Sanborn	Another Hand	1991	Elektra/Musician	Hal Willner production
Don Byron	Tuskegee Experiments	1992	Elektra/Musician	
Rinde Ekert	Finding My Way Home	1992	DIW	
Robin Holcomb	Rockabye	1992	Elektra/Musician	
Wayne Horvitz	Miracle Mile	1992	Elektra Nonesuch	
John Scofield	Grace Under Pressure	1992	Blue Note	
Various	Weird Nightmare: Meditations on Mingus	1992	Columbia	Hal Willner production featuring Elvis Costello and the instruments designed and built by Harry Partch
Brian Ales	Naiveté	1993	Intuition	on "Personal Montuno" and "This Dream"
Jerry Granelli	A Song I Thought I Heard Buddy Sing	1993	Evidence	
Ginger Baker	Going Back Home	1994	WEA	
Michael Shrieve	Fascination	1994	CMP	
William S. Burroughs	Naked Lunch	1995	Warner	Hal Willner production
Don Byron	Music for Six Musicians	1995	Nonesuch	
Michael Shrieve	Two Doors	1995	CMP	
Arto Lindsay	O Corpo Sutil / The Subtle Body	1996	Rykodisc	
Ginger Baker	Falling Off the Roof	1996	WEA	
Joey Baron	Down Home	1997	Intuition	
Gabriela	Detrás del sol	1997	Intuition	
Ron Miles	Woman's Day	1997	Gramavision	
Donald Rubinstein	Time Again	1997	Rhombus	
Kenny Wheeler	Angel Song	1997	ECM	
Marc Johnson	The Sound of Summer Running	1998	Verve	
Douglas September	Ten Bulls	1998	Sampson	
Don Byron	Romance with the Unseen	1999	Blue Note	
Vinicius Cantuaria	Tucumã	1999	Verve/PolyGram	
Ron Carter	Orfeu	1999	Blue Note	
Gabriela	Viento rojo	1999	Intuition	
Mike Stern	Play	1999	WEA	
David Sylvian	Dead Bees on a Cake	1999	Virgin	two tracks with Frisell, another two outtakes on 2000 compilation Everything and Nothing
Joey Baron	We'll Soon Find Out	2000	Intuition	
Eyvind Kang	The Story of Iceland	2000	Tzadik	
John Scofield	The Story of Iceland	2000	Tzadik	
Living Daylights	Electric Rosary	2000	Liquid City	on four tracks
Various	The Million Dollar Hotel: Music from the Motion Picture	2000	Interscope	Hal Willner production
Dale Bruning	Reunion	2001	Jazz Link	
Vinicius Cantuaria	Vinicius	2001	Transparent	
Norah Jones	Come Away with Me	2002	Blue Note	on "The Long Day Is Over"
Robin Holcomb	The Big Time	2002	Nonesuch	
Wayne Horvitz	Film Music 1998–2001	2002	Tzadik	
Ron Miles	Heaven	2002	Sterling Circle	
Sarah Siskind	Covered	2002	Infrasound Collective	
Danny Barnes	Dirt on the Angel	2003	Terminus	
Rickie Lee Jones	The Evening of My Best Day	2003	V2	
Laura Veirs	Troubled by the Fire	2003	Bella Union	
Dave Douglas	Strange Liberation	2004	RCA	
Viktor Krauss	Far from Enough	2004	Nonesuch	
Mount Analog	New Skin	2004	Filmguerro	
Mylab	Mylab	2004	Terminus	collaboration by Tucker Martine and Wayne Horvitz
David Binney	Out of Airplanes	2005	BeenKnee	
Vic Chesnutt	Ghetto Bells	2005	New West	
Renée Fleming	Haunted Heart	2005	Decca	
Heather Greene	Five Dollar Dress	2005	BHM	
Jazzensemble des Hessischen Rundfunks	Atmospheric Conditions Permitting (Radio Recordings 1967–1993)	2005	ECM	compilation with one long track featuring Frisell
Jenny Scheinman	12 Songs	2005	Cryptogramophone	
Cuong Vu	It's Mostly Residual	2005	Intoxicate	
Loudon Wainwright III	Here Come the Choppers	2005	Sovereign	
Lizz Wright	Dreaming Wide Awake	2005	Verve Forecast	
Various	Fusion for Miles: A Guitar Tribute	2005	Tone Center	on "Nefertiti"
Gabriela	El viaje	2006	Intuition	
Carrie Rodriguez	Seven Angels on a Bicycle	2006	Train Wreck/Back Porch	
Jonah Smith	Jonah Smith	2006	Relix	
Gianmaria Testa	Da questa parte del mare	2006	Le Chant du Monde	
Various	Rogue's Gallery: Pirate Ballads, Sea Songs, and Chanteys	2006	Anti-	Hal Willner production
Paul Simon	Surprise	2006	Warner	on "Everything About It Is a Love Song"
Joe Henry	Civilians	2007	Anti-	
Viktor Krauss	II	2007	Narada	
Donald Rubinstein	Knightriders	2007	Perseverance	on two tracks; reissued as on Scare Flair in 2023
John Scofield	This Meets That	2007	EmArcy	
Lucinda Williams	West	2007	Anti-	
Earth	The Bees Made Honey in the Lion's Skull	2008	Southern Lord	
Jakob Bro	Balladeering	2009	Loveland	
Richard Hell & The Voidoids	Destiny Street Repaired	2009	Insound	
Sam Shrieve	Bittersweet Lullabies	2009	Colorburst Soundfield	on Leonard Cohen's Hallelujah and another track
Vinicius Cantuaria	Samba Carioca	2010	Naïve	
Scott Colley	Empire	2010	CAM Jazz	
Kermit Driscoll	Reveille	2010	Nineteen-Eight	
Hans Koller	Cry, Want	2010	PSI	with Evan Parker a.o.
Buddy Miller	Buddy Miller's Majestic Silver Strings	2010	New West	with Marc Ribot and Greg Leisz
Carrie Rodriguez	Love and Circumstance	2010	Ninth Street Opus	
Jakob Bro	Time	2011	Loveland	
Hank Roberts	Everything Is Alive	2011	Winter & Winter	
Dale Bruning	Just Between Us	2012	Jazz Link	
Vinicius Cantuaria	Indio de Apartamento	2011	Naïve	on three tracks
Shawn Colvin	All Fall Down	2012	Nonesuch	
Ron Miles	Quiver	2012	Enja/Yellowbird	
Bonnie Raitt	Slipstream	2012	Redwing	
Jan Erik Vold	Blackbird Bye Bye	2012	Hot Club	
Joey Baron	Just Listen	2013	Relative Pitch	
Jakob Bro	December Song	2013	Loveland	
Sam Amidon	Lily-O	2014	Nonesuch	
Stefano Bollani	Joy in Spite of Everything	2014	ECM	feat. Mark Turner
Ron Miles	Circuit Rider	2014	Enja/Yellowbird	trio with Brian Blade
Greg Cohen	Golden State	2014	Relative Pitch	
Jenny Scheinman	The Littlest Prisoner	2014	Song	
Lucinda Williams	Down Where the Spirit Meets the Bone	2014	Highway 20	
Dale Bruning	Thanks for the Memory... Jim Hall	2015	Jazz Link	
Vinicius Cantuária	Vinicius Canta Antonio Carlos Jobim	2015	Song X Jazz (Jp)/ Sunnyside	on "Só Dango Samba" and "Inútil Paisagem"
William S. Burroughs	Let Me Hang You	2016	Khannibalism	Hal Willner production
Kris Davis	Duopoly	2016	Pyroclastic	on two tracks
Andrew Cyrille	The Declaration of Musical Independence	2016	ECM	
Charles Lloyd & The Marvels	I Long to See You	2016	Blue Note	
Carrie Rodriguez	Lola	2016	Luz	
Allen Toussaint	American Tunes	2016	Nonesuch	
Jerry Granelli	Dance Hall	2017	Justin Time	
Kramer	The Brill Building, Book Two	2017	Tzadik	
Ron Miles	I Am a Man	2017	Enja/Yellowbird	
Cuong Vu 4-Tet	Ballet (The Music of Michael Gibbs)	2017	RareNoise	
Andrew Cyrille	Lebroba	2018	ECM	trio with Wadada Leo Smith
Mary Halvorson	The Maid with the Flaxen Hair	2018	Tzadik	
Charles Lloyd & The Marvels + Lucinda Williams	Vanished Gardens	2018	Blue Note	
Cuong Vu 4-Tet	Change in the Air	2018	RareNoise	
Paul Simon	In the Blue Light	2018	Legacy	
Sarah Siskind	Modern Appalachia	2020	Red Request	on "Modern Appalachia" and "Porchlight"
Jesse Harris, Vinicius Cantuária	Surpresa	2021	Sunnyside	
Andrew Cyrille	The News	2021	ECM	
Charles Lloyd & The Marvels	Tone Poem	2021	Blue Note	
Charles Lloyd	Trios: Chapel	2022	Blue Note	
Noël Akchoté	Loving Highsmith	2022	Ayler	
Ches Smith	Interpret It Well	2022	Pyroclastic	
Julian Lage	View with a Room	2022	Blue Note	
Julian Lage	The Layers	2023	Blue Note	
Ambrose Akinmusire	Owl Song	2023	Blue Note	
Chantal Acda/The Atlantic Drifters	Silently Held	2024	Challenge Classics	
Jenny Scheinman	All Species Parade	2024	Royal Potato Family	
Woody Jackson	Cowboy Yoga	2024	Electro-Vox Records	
Elaine Elias	Time and Again	2024	Candid Records	
Jakob Bro	Taking Turns	2024	ECM	
Chris Cheek	Keepers of the Eastern Door	2025	Analog Tone Factory	
Henry Threadgill	Listen Ship	2025	Pi Recordings	
The Count Basie Orchestra	Basie Rocks!	2025	Green Hill Productions	
Brandon Seabrook	Utility Modern	2026	Out of Your Head Records	
Chris Potter	Alive With Ghosts Today	2026	Edition Records	

== Film soundtracks ==
Beside his music for Buster Keaton's silent films Go West, The High Sign and One Week (see album section above), his collaborations with producer Hal Willner (cf. section above), and with John Zorn on his music for films (cf. section above), Frisell provided also original soundtracks for the following films

- Gary Larson's Tales from the Far Side I & II directed by Gary Larson and Marv Newland (CBS, 1994 & 1997)
- La scuola, feature film directed by Daniele Luchetti (1995)
- American Hollow, documentary film directed by Rory Kennedy (HBO, 1999)
- Almost Heaven, feature film directed by Ed Herzog (O.S.T. on Island, 2005)
- All Hat, feature film directed by Leonard Farlinger (O.S.T. on EmArcy, 2008)
- Disfarmer: A Portrait of America on photographer Mike Disfarmer directed by Martin Lavut (2010)
  - The Disfarmer Project, DVD with live performances and interviews (La Huit, 2012)
- Portrait of a Man, documentary film directed by Visa Koiso-Kanttila (2010)
- The Great Flood, documentary film on the Great Mississippi Flood of 1927 directed by Bill Morrison (DVD, Icarus Films, 2014)
- Change in the Air, feature film directed by Dianne Dreyer (2018)

For the Music from the Motion Picture Finding Forrester (2000) starring Sean Connery Hal Willner chose –alongside music by Miles Davis and Ornette Coleman– several tracks from Frisell's already existing œuvre. His music was exclusively used by photographer Joel Meyerowitz' portrait of his dad, Pop, that was produced for HBO Frontline (Season 17, Episode 10, 1999). For The Lobster and the Liver: The Unique World of Jim Woodring (2010) on cartoonist Jim Woodring directed by Jonathan Howells featured his music as well.

=== Personal appearances in music documentary films and TV shows ===
Appearances as himself as musician and/or pundit

- Bill Frisell: A Portrait directed by Emma Franz (2017)

In music documentary films

- Icons Among Us on jazz today, directed by Lars Larson, Michael Rivoira and Peter J. Vogt (2009)
- Weightless: A Recording Session with Jakob Bro featuring Jakob Bro, directed by Sune Blicher (2009)
- In Good Time: The Piano Jazz of Marian McPartland on Marian McPartland, directed by Huey (2011)
- Every Other Summer on Wilco's 2013 Solid Sound music festival, directed by Christoph Green and Brendan Canty (2015)
- Carmine Street Guitars directed by Ron Mann (2018)
- Music for Black Pigeons featuring Jakob Bro, directed by Andreas Koefoed and Jørgen Leth (2022)

On TV shows

- Spectacle: Elvis Costello with..., Season 1, Episode 7 and 9, accompanying Renée Fleming and Rufus Wainwright (Channel 4/CTV, both 2009)
- The Late Show with Stephen Colbert, Season 2, Episode 156, as guest musician accompanying Paul Simon (CBS, 2017)
