= Vinicius (album) =

2001 album by Vinicius Cantuária

Studio album by Vinicius Cantuária
- Released: 2001
- Label: Transparent Music
- Producer: Lee Townsend

Vinicius Cantuária chronology
Tucumā (1998)	Vinicius (2001)	Live: Skirball Cultural Center 8/7/03 (2003)

Vinicius is a 2001 album by guitarist, vocalist and percussionist Vinicius Cantuária.

== Music and recording ==
This was Cantuária's fourth album. It was produced by Lee Townsend and released by Transparent Music. The compositions are by Cantuária, with David Byrne, Arto Lindsay, Gilberto Gil, and Nana Vasconcelos. Other musicians include Joey Baron, Marc Ribot, Bill Frisell, Brad Mehldau, and David Byrne. The JazzTimes described the music as containing "a traditional Brazilian atmosphere with contemporary colorings".

"Jenny Scheinman suspends cumulus clouds of violin over 'Cliche do cliche' and 'Irapuru', while 'Ordinaria' rides on a constricted bass throb before opening into a lustrous chorus." On "Ela e carioca", "Frisell's guitar arpeggios simulate the chill piano playing of Joao Donato for a classic bossa nova feel, while elsewhere the guitars combine with Mehldau's piano to create the style's distinctive harmonies."

== Track listing ==
1. "Cliche do Cliche"
2. "Ela e Carioca"
3. "Agua Rasa"
4. "Ordinaria"
5. "Quase Choro"
6. "Rio"
7. "Normal"
8. "Nova de Sete"
9. "Irapuru"
10. "Caju"
11. "To You"

== Personnel ==
- Vinicius Cantuária – guitar, vocals, percussion
- Brad Mehldau – piano
- Bill Frisell – guitar
- Marc Ribot – guitar
- Jenny Scheinman – violin
- Marc Johnson – bass
- Joey Baron – drums
- David Byrne – vocals
