= In My Dreams (Bill Frisell album) =

Live album / studio album by Bill Frisell
- Released: February 27, 2026
- Recorded: 2025 (live); February 6, 2025 (studio)
- Venue: Firehouse 12, New Haven, CT; Roulette Intermedium, Brooklyn, NY; The Newman Center, Denver, CO
- Studio: Opus Studios, Berkeley, CA
- Genre: Folk; jazz
- Length: 62:13
- Label: Blue Note; 234467 LP / 8813766 CD
- Producer: Lee Townsend

Bill Frisell chronology
Orchestras (2024)	In My Dreams (2026)

In My Dreams is a live/studio album by American jazz guitarist Bill Frisell, released by Blue Note Records on February 27, 2026. It features Frisell in his longtime trio, bassist Thomas Morgan and drummer Rudy Royston, joined by a string ensemble—violinist Jenny Scheinman, violist Eyvind Kang, and cellist Hank Roberts, all three of whom have history with Frisell and debuted with him on 2005's Richter 858.

The album was released as part of Frisell's 75th birthday celebrations; he would perform the music of In My Dreams at various venues throughout 2025, including the Denver Jazz Fest, the Blue Note Jazz Club (Los Angeles), Jazz at Lincoln Center's Appel Room, and at Herbst Theatre hosted by SFJAZZ, as a part of the celebrations.

== Background ==
In My Dreams was inspired by a dream Frisell had over three decades ago:

Frisell enters a darkened building, traverses a stairwell and finds himself in a breathtaking library surrounded by stacks of leather-bound volumes and antiquities. At the center of the room is a table, and seated around the table are several monk-like figures in hoods. They seem forbidding at first, but quickly reveal themselves as warm and welcoming. "We want to show you what things really are," they say. "First, we'd like to show you what colors really look like."

Frisell narrates: "So they open this little box and take out these small blocks. They point to one and say, 'This is what red looks like.' And it's the most intense, beautiful thing I've ever seen. Then they say, 'We know you’re a musician, so we'd like you to hear what real music sounds like.' It felt like some sort of tube was going into my forehead and moving around, and it was the most incredible sound I'd ever heard. Nino Rota, Thelonious Monk, Sonny Rollins, Charles Ives, Jimi Hendrix, Hank Williams, Andrés Segovia, Robert Johnson—all this music I love, but all the parts were crystal clear. And then I woke up."

== Reception ==
Professional ratings
Aggregate scores
Source	Rating
Metacritic	78/100
Review scores
Source	Rating
All About Jazz	4.5/5 stars
AllMusic	4.5/5 stars
PopMatters	8/10
UK Vibe	5/5

All About Jazz noted that "Although the music can feel like a relaxed 'family reunion' with musicians he knows well, the underlying architecture is a meticulously crafted control of ensemble density, thoughtful repertoire choices, and a carefully constructed illusion of documentary spontaneity."

Matt Collar of AllMusic wrote, "There's an underlying complexity of emotion to Frisell's work on In My Dreams and though never explicitly stated, one gets the sense that he's wrestling with all of the good, bad, and ugly aspects of America's westward expansion ... It's a meditative experience, where classic folk melodies and standards seem to shimmer into focus like a mirage in desert sun."

Glide Magazine concluded, "In My Dreams proves that subtlety, judicious use of space, and generous, trusted sharing can deliver a quietly gorgeous soundscape. Frisell harnesses all his trademark attributes into one, evocative declarative statement."

Mojo gave mixed reviews of the album, writing, "Frisell is travelling a unique, but to old admirers, rather familiar path here."

Steve Horowitz, writing for PopMatters, stated, "the music has a dreamlike quality. The atmospherics are generally soothing. ... The song selection reveals Frisell's obsessions with historical arcana, experimental sounds, and jazz traditions. ... The musicians start quietly playing these simple tunes. Then they increase the tension a notch and let the beauty of the melody mysteriously build without ever reaching a climax."

UK Jazz News's Liam Noble explained, "This collection of reinterpretations and new material forms a snapshot of someone looking forward and back at the same time, trusting that the process of making music with friends is…enough."

UK Vibe called it a "stunning album, and a fitting celebration of a musician whose influence is as profound as it is quietly worn", and that it represents "Bill Frisell at his most human and most generous".

Uncut stated, "The title track lurches woozily like it's about to break out into a waltz but never does, and 'Hard Times' is an aching Celtic/Appalachian ballad. We end with the loveliest take on 'Home On The Range' you've ever heard."

== Track listing ==
All tracks are written by Bill Frisell except where noted.

No.	Title	Writer(s)	Notes	Length
1.	"Trapped in the Sky"			2:06
2.	"When We Go" (live)			7:51
3.	"In My Dreams" (live)			5:12
4.	"Isfahan" (live)	Billy Strayhorn; Duke Ellington		6:33
5.	"Give Me a Home"		interpolation of "Home on the Range"	2:53
6.	"Why?"			3:17
7.	"Curtis (A Year and a Day)" (live)		dedicated to Curtis Fowlkes	7:23
8.	"Hard Times" (live)	Stephen Foster		4:41
9.	"Again" (live)			6:16
10.	"Small Hands" (live)			6:18
11.	"Never Too Late"			4:05
12.	"Home on the Range" (live)	Brewster M. Higley; Daniel E. Kelley		5:38
Total length:				62:13

== Personnel ==
Musicians

- Bill Frisell – acoustic guitar, electric guitar, loops; (except track 1)
- Jenny Scheinman – violin
- Eyvind Kang – viola
- Hank Roberts – cello
- Thomas Morgan – double bass
- Rudy Royston – drums

Technical

- Lee Townsend – producer
- Adam Muñoz – recording engineer, mixing, editing
- Joseph Branciforte, Kevin Lee, Nick Lloyd – recording engineer
- Claudia Engelhart – live sound
- Greg Calbi, Steve Fallone – mastering
- Luke Jacobs – design
- Carole d'Inverno – artwork
- Kyra Kverno – photography

== Charts ==
=== Weekly charts ===
Weekly chart performance for In My Dreams
Chart (2026)	Peak position
French Jazz Albums (SNEP)	17
French Physical Albums (SNEP)	189
UK Jazz & Blues Albums (OCC)	7
US Top Jazz Albums (Billboard)	20
US Top Traditional Jazz Albums (Billboard)	1

=== Monthly charts ===
Monthly chart performance for In My Dreams
Chart (2026)	Peak position
German Jazz Albums (Offizielle Top 100)	12
