= Christos Govetas =

Greek musician

Christos Govetas (Greek: Χρήστος Γωβέτας) is a Greek musician known for singing and playing the bouzouki.

Govetas was born in the village of Proti, Serres in the province of Serres in Macedonia, Greece. After emigrating to Boston in 1978 he joined the Greek rebetiko band Taximi as a bouzouki player and their main vocalist. Since then he has played classical music on the oud and bendir with The Eurasia Ensemble, Greek, Turkish, and Arabic music with Karavani and regional Balkan music with Tito's Revenge and Akshambelah in the Boston area.

He has performed extensively in the U.S., Canada, and Greece. He is a member of the nationally-known band Ziyia. He performs regularly with Pangeo and a rebetiko group Pasatempos in the Seattle area. Christos is the 1999 recipient of the prestigious Northwest Folklife Fellowship Award honoring his cultural contribution to the Greek-American and Folk dance communities.

Christos also recorded & toured with Bill Frisell in 2003 on Frisell's album The Intercontinentals that was nominated for the Grammy Award in 2004.
