= Cymbal (disambiguation) =

Cymbal and similar can mean:

- Cymbal, a percussion instrument made of metal disks
- Cymbalom, a stringed instrument
- Cymbals (Japanese band), a Japanese rock band
- Cymbals (British band), a band from London
- Cymbals (album), a recording by Vinicius Cantuária

== See also ==
- Symbol
- Hi-hat
