= All We Can Do =

All We Can Do may refer to:

- "All We Can Do", song by Bill Frisell from Beautiful Dreamers (album)
- "All We Can Do", from Poo Bear Presents Bearthday Music
