= We'll Soon Find Out =

Studio album by Joey Baron
- Released: 1999
- Recorded: 1999
- Genre: Jazz
- Length: 54:04
- Label: Intuition; INT 3515
- Producer: Lee Townsend

Joey Baron chronology
| Down Home (1997) | We'll Soon Find Out (1999) | Beyond (2001) |

We'll Soon Find Out is an album by drummer Joey Baron which was recorded in 1999 and released on Schott Music's Intition label.

== Reception ==
Professional ratings
Review scores
| Source | Rating |
|---|---|
| AllMusic | 3/5 stars |
| The Penguin Guide to Jazz Recordings | 3.5/4 stars |

In his review on AllMusic, Tim Sheridan calls it "a nice mix of soulful jazz and progressive post-bop. An all around winning effort". On All About Jazz, Glenn Astarita said, "We’ll Soon Find Out offers breezy passages, finger snapping rhythms, strong yet unobtrusive and quite thoughtful soloing in accordance with Baron’s conspicuous compositional pen... Baron, Frisell, Blythe and Carter shine forth with a candid demeanor while also providing a clinic of sorts – on the art of making good music that certainly strikes a memorable chord". In JazzTimes, Ron Wynn noted, "Baron's Down Home Band eschews the rowdy approach in their playing; this date's about atmosphere much more than mood. Yet it's not so introspective the music gets boring. Rather, Joey Baron and the Down Home Band manage the tough task of going inside, while retaining their outside flair". PopMatters' James Mann said, "Joey Baron seems to be both very active and blessed with good taste in sidemen. On this second release from these players (the first was Down Home in 1997), he has formed the basis for a hopefully long-lasting series of musical events. As long as the results are this satisfying, the jazz world will await future installments with eagerness".

== Track listing ==
All compositions by Joey Baron

1. "Slow Charleston" – 6:09
2. "Closer Than You Think" – 7:50
3. "Junior" – 5:53
4. "Time to Cry" – 6:25
5. "Wisely" – 5:44
6. "Bit 'o Water" – 3:36
7. "M" – 7:05
8. "Equaled" – 4:22
9. "Contact" – 7:05

== Personnel ==
- Joey Baron – drums
- Arthur Blythe – alto saxophone
- Bill Frisell – acoustic and electric guitar
- Ron Carter – bass
