= Gary Larson's Tales from the Far Side =

- DVD cover
- Also known as: Tales from the Far Side
- Created by: Gary Larson
- Directed by: Marv Newland
- Starring: Kathleen Barr; Doug Parker; Lee Tockar; Dale Wilson
- Composer: Bill Frisell
- Country of origin: United States; Canada

Production
- Producers: Dennis Heaton; Toni A. Carmichael; Michael van den Bos
- Running time: 30 minutes

Original release
- Network: CBS
- Release: October 26, 1994

Gary Larson's Tales from the Far Side is an animated short film created in 1994 by Gary Larson, based on The Far Side comic strip. Both the title and concept are largely inspired by EC Comics' Tales From The Crypt. It was first shown as a Halloween special on CBS television, which aired on October 26, 1994. Later it was awarded the Grand Prix at the Annecy International Animation Film Festival.

== Content ==
The film is a loosely-structured anthology film, jumping among several simple stories. Many of these situations use staple clichés of horror films, such as undead monsters and the dark and stormy night. The stories sometimes turn macabre, but are presented in a lighthearted fashion. They are mainly as those in the printed comic, including many background throwaway gags from well-known panels.

The characters and settings are all common to Larson's work, such as aliens, anthropomorphic animals and other objects, and cowboys in the Old West. The art style is essentially the same as that of the Far Side, with animation and sound effects.

== Production ==
The animation was made in Vancouver, British Columbia, Canada, at director-animator Marv Newland's International Rocketship Productions.

The film features an original music score by jazz guitarist Bill Frisell. Some of the compositions from the soundtrack are included on his 1996 album Quartet.

== Sequel ==
In 1997 the film spawned a sequel, Tales from the Far Side II. This follow-up was never broadcast on American television, but it aired in the UK on BBC and appeared in numerous film festivals. Both films were released on VHS and DVD and were available for purchase by U.S. addresses from the official Far Side website.
