= Heaven (Ron Miles album) =

Studio album by Ron Miles
- Released: May 7, 2002
- Recorded: Spring 2001
- Studio: Wind Over the Earth, Longmont, CO
- Genre: Jazz
- Length: 55:15
- Label: Stirling Circle; SC5151
- Producer: Mickey Houlihan

Ron Miles chronology
Ron Miles Trio (2000)	Heaven (2002)	Laughing Barrel (2003)

Heaven is an album by trumpeter Ron Miles with guitarist Bill Frisell which was released on the Stirling Circle label in 2002.

== Reception ==
Professional ratings
Review scores
Source	Rating
Allmusic	4/5 stars
The Penguin Guide to Jazz Recordings	3.5/4 stars

Allmusic's Robert L. Doerschuk stated "On these stark and stunning duets, Miles and Frisell display complete rapport with respect to manipulating silences and minimal resources. There's an arid quality in their approach, which turns each title into an audio approximation of a desert mirage, shimmering yet still in heavy, timeless heat. Each song gets plenty of breathing room; none is bent too far into abstract contortions".

On All About Jazz, Dan McCleneghan said "Heaven is a delicately rendered set of songs, highlighting the strengths of the two players. Ron Miles has a breathy, very lyrical approach to the trumpet; his six originals here have memorable, straightforward melodies that seem to cry out for words. Bill Frisell—whom Miles has worked with—is a perfect accompanist for the soft trumpet sound. His acoustic talent is subtle and nuanced, versatile as it can be". On the same site Mark Corroto observed "You would not typically pair a trumpeter and guitarist in a jazz setting. Come to think of it, they aren’t typically paired in any other musical setting. Maybe that’s why these duets by Ron Miles and Bill Frisell are so refreshing".

In JazzTimes Bill Milkowski wrote "Heaven finds the two kindred spirits exchanging ideas in an intimate, purely acoustic setting like old friends engaged in a warm, animated conversation".

== Track listing ==
All compositions by Ron Miles except where noted

1. "Just Married" – 4:48
2. "Coward of the County" – 4:57
3. "Ron Miles" (Bill Frisell) – 2:57
4. "Beautiful" – 3:53
5. "We See" (Thelonious Monk) – 5:46
6. "Heaven" (Duke Ellington) – 3:52
7. "King Porter Stomp" (Jelly Roll Morton) – 3:50
8. "Your Cheatin' Heart" (Hank Williams) – 5:50
9. "Close" – 6:26
10. "Falsetto" – 5:08
11. "A Hard Rain's a-Gonna Fall" (Bob Dylan) – 4:13
12. "Darken My Door" – 3:35

== Personnel ==
- Ron Miles – trumpet
- Bill Frisell – guitar
