= Crackshot =

Studio album by Joey Baron + Barondown
- Released: 1995
- Recorded: August 5 & 6, 1995
- Studio: Gutbucket Digital at Sorcerer Sound, NYC
- Genre: Jazz
- Length: 61:51
- Label: Avant; AVAN 059
- Producer: David Breskin

Joey Baron chronology
RAIsedpleasuredot (1994)	Crackshot (1995)	Down Home (1997)

Crackshot is an album by drummer Joey Baron and his group Barondown, trombonist Steve Swell and saxophonist Ellery Eskelin, which was released by the Avant label in 1995.

== Reception ==
Professional ratings
Review scores
Source	Rating
AllMusic	3/5 stars

The AllMusic review by Al Campbell said "All compositions are by Baron, and will definitely satisfy those with an open ear to creative music on the edge, while the sometimes funky arrangements should make the CD much more palatable to casual listeners. Crackshot covers a lot of ground in its 11 tracks ... Challenging yet oddly accessible. Highly recommended". In JazzTimes Sid Gribetz wrote "The album showcases Baron’s very melodious post-modern drumming, with crisp, articulated, solo passages. The disc also features all Baron compositions, with room for staccato bursts, seemingly unlinked by melody or lyricism, but somehow still very musical. The hearty songs are really riffs for exploration, soul taken downtown".

== Track listing ==
All compositions by Joey Baron

1. "D.B." − 5:31
2. "Dog" – 5:31
3. "Offering from a Pigeon" – 4:29
4. "Toothpick Serenade" – 6:46
5. "Punt" – 4:45
6. "Games on a Train" – 11:16
7. "Friend" – 6:30
8. "11:58" – 4:13
9. "Oseola" – 5:49
10. "Tantilla Garden" – 4:43
11. "Sittin' on a Cornflake" – 11:23

== Personnel ==
- Joey Baron – drums
- Steve Swell – trombone
- Ellery Eskelin – tenor saxophone
