= Floratone II =

Studio album by Bill Frisell, Matt Chamberlain, Lee Townsend, Tucker Martine
- Released: March 2, 2012
- Recorded: 2012
- Studio: Flora, Portland, OR, Kung Fu Bakery, Portland, OR and Phantom Studios, Westlake Village, CA
- Genre: Jazz
- Length: 38:06
- Label: Savoy SVY17855
- Producer: Lee Townsend, Tucker Martine

Bill Frisell chronology
All We Are Saying (2011)	Floratone II (2012)	Silent Comedy (2013)

Floratone II is the second album by the collective Floratone, which comprises guitarist Bill Frisell, drummer Matt Chamberlain along with producers Lee Townsend and Tucker Martine which was released on the Savoy label in 2012.

== Reception ==
Professional ratings
Review scores
Source	Rating
AllMusic	4/5 stars
All About Jazz	4.5/5 stars

In his review for AllMusic, Thom Jurek notes that, "Floratone II is a sonically more adventurous, yet more musically focused album than its predecessor". On PopMatters, John Garrett noted "Floratone II sharpens every shortcoming that the first album had. The pieces are tighter, melodies better pronounced, and the studio manipulation never offers too much or not enough. I'm not going to say that this is one of the best albums of Bill Frisell's career but I will warn you that it can get stuck in your head". On All About Jazz, John Kelman said "as Floratone continues to drive Teo Macero's innovative collage work with trumpeter Miles Davis' late 1960s/early 1970s electric music into the 21st century and beyond, the expansive, cinematic Floratone II gives hope that Frisell, Chamberlain, Townsend and Martine will continue to collaborate well into the future".

== Track listing ==
All compositions by Bill Frisell, Matt Chamberlain, Lee Townsend and Tucker Martine

1. "The Bloom Is On" – 4:37
2. "More Pluck" – 3:27
3. "Snake, Rattle" – 3:27
4. "Parade" – 3:18
5. "Not Over Ever" – 1:01
6. "Move" – 3:00
7. "Do You Have It?" – 4:04
8. "The Time, The Place" – 2:23
9. "No Turn Back" – 4:01
10. "The Time, The Place (Part 2)" – 2:02
11. "Gimme Some" – 2:45
12. "Grin and Bite" – 1:03
13. "Stand By This" – 2:53

== Personnel ==
- Bill Frisell – guitar
- Matt Chamberlain – drums, percussion
- Lee Townsend, Tucker Martine - production
- Mike Elizondo – bass
- Jon Brion – keyboards
- Ron Miles – trumpet
- Eyvind Kang – viola
