= Samba Carioca =

Studio album by Vinicius Cantuária
- Released: March 27, 2010
- Recorded: Avatar, New York City
- Genre: Jazz
- Label: Naïve
- Producer: Arto Lindsay

Vinicius Cantuária chronology
Cymbals (2008)	Samba Carioca (2010)	Lágrimas Mexicanas (2011)

Samba Carioca is a 2010 album by guitarist and vocalist Vinicius Cantuária.

== Music and recording ==
The album was produced by Arto Lindsay. "While some of the melodies are quintessential bossa fare, the lyrics often have something of the enigmatic beauty of haiku: 'Berlin', for instance, takes a backward glance at the Siegessäule column in the Tiergarten".

== Reception ==
The Independent's reviewer described it as "laid-back, drifting samba-jazz". The Sunday Times commented that it "cements his reputation as one of Brazil's finest exports".

== Track listing ==
1. "Praia Grande" – 5:57
2. "Berlin" – 5:19
3. "Vagamente" – 2:52
4. "Inútil Paisagem" – 4:14
5. "Julinha De Botas" – 1:46
6. "Fugiu" – 3:35
7. "Orla" – 6:39
8. "Conversa Fiada" – 4:33
9. "So Focou Saudade" – 6:06

== Personnel ==
- Vinicius Cantuária – guitar, vocals, keyboards, drums, percussion
- Dadi, Bill Frisell – guitar
- Jessé Sadoc – flugelhorn
- João Donato – piano
- Marcos Valle – piano
- Brad Mehldau – piano
- Luiz Alves – bass
- Liminha – double bass
- Paulo Braga – acoustic drums
- Sidinho – percussion
