= Curtis Fowlkes =

American jazz trombonist and singer (1950–2023)

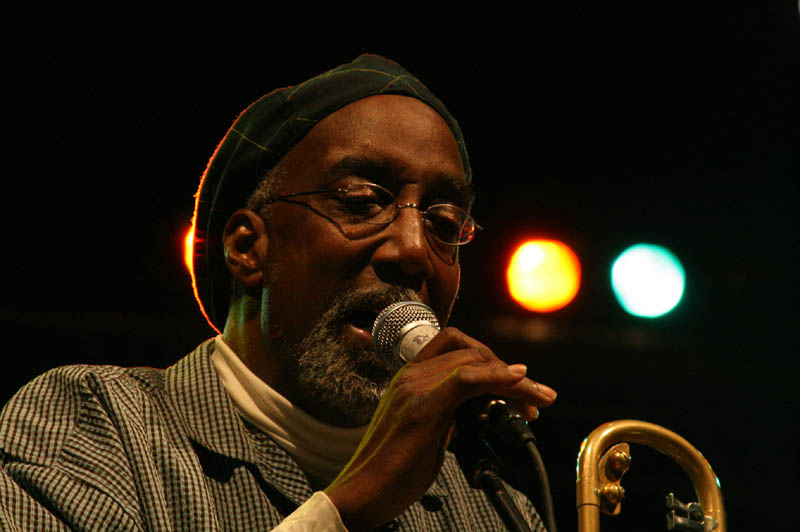
- Photo by Bogdan Dimitriu

Background information
- Born: March 19, 1950; New York City, New York, U.S.
- Died: August 31, 2023 (aged 73) Brooklyn, New York, U.S.
- Genres: Jazz, pop, rock
- Occupations: Musician, singer, composer
- Instruments: Trombone, voice
- Years active: 1969–2023
- Labels: Knitting Factory
- Formerly of: The Jazz Passengers, The Lounge Lizards

Curtis Fowlkes (March 19, 1950 – August 31, 2023) was an American jazz trombonist and singer. He was a founding member of The Jazz Passengers. He had a twin brother James May Fowlkes and his parents were James Ray and Rosa May Fowlkes.

== Career ==
In 1987, Fowlkes started The Jazz Passengers with saxophonist Roy Nathanson. He was a member of The Lounge Lizards, the Kansas City All-Stars, and a quartet led by jazz guitarist Bill Frisell. He toured with Charlie Haden's Liberation Music Orchestra, as well as the Duke Ellington Orchestra when it was led by drummer Louis Bellson. He released his debut solo album in 1999.

== Death ==
Curtis Fowlkes died from heart failure in Brooklyn, New York, on August 31, 2023, at the age of 73.

== Discography ==
=== As leader ===
- Reflect (Knitting Factory, 1999)

With The Jazz Passengers

- Implement Yourself (New World/CounterCurrents 1990)
- Live at the Knitting Factory (Knitting Factory, 1991)
- Plain Old Joe (Knitting Factory, 1993)
- In Love (High Street, 1994)
- Individually Twisted (32 Records, 1996)
- Re-United (Justin Time, 2010)
- Still Life with Trouble (Thirsty Ear, 2017)

With The Lounge Lizards

- Big Heart: Live in Tokyo (Island, 1986)
- No Pain for Cakes (Island, 1987)
- Voice of Chunk (Lagarto, 1988)

=== As sideman ===
With Don Byron

- Nu Blaxploitation (Capitol, 1998)
- You Are #6 (Blue Note, 2001)
- Do the Boomerang (Blue Note, 2006)

With Bill Frisell

- Quartet (Nonesuch, 1996)
- This Land (Elektra Nonesuch, 1994)
- Blues Dream (Nonesuch, 2001)
- Unspeakable (Nonesuch, 2004)

With Glen Hansard

- Didn't He Ramble (Anti-, 2015)
- A Season On the Line (Anti-, 2016)
- Between Two Shores (Anti-, 2018)
- This Wild Willing (Anti-, 2019)

With Charlie Hunter

- Right Now Move (Ropeadope, 2003)
- Baboon Strength (Spire Artist 2008)
- Gentlemen, I Neglected to Inform You You Will Not Be Getting Paid (Spire Artist 2010)
- Let the Bells Ring On (Charlie Hunter, 2015)
- We Two Kings (Rank Hypocri$i, 2015)
- Everybody Has a Plan Until They Get Punched in the Mouth (GroundUP, 2016)

With John Lurie

- Stranger Than Paradise and the Resurrection of Albert Ayler (Attitude/Crammed Discs 1985)
- Down by Law (Made to Measure/Crammed Discs 1987)
- Excess Baggage (Prophecy, 1997)

With Roy Nathanson

- Broken Night Red Light with Roy Nathanson, (Crepuscule, 1988)
- Deranged and Decomposed with Roy Nathanson (Crepuscule, 1988)
- Camp Stories (Knitting Factory, 1996)
- Fire at Keaton's Bar & Grill (Six Degrees, 2000)
- Sotto Voce (AUM Fidelity, 2006)
- Subway Moon (Yellowbird, 2009)
- Nearness and You (Clean Feed, 2016)
- Complicated Day (Yellowbird/Enja, 2014)

With Roy Nathanson & Nick Hakim

- Small Things (NYXO, 2021)

With Marc Ribot

- YRU Still Here? (Northern Spy, 2018)
- Rootless Cosmopolitans (Island, 1990)
- Shoe String Symphonettes (Tzadik, 1997)

With Elliott Sharp

- Forgery (Intuition, 2007)
- Spectropia Suite (NEOS, 2010)
- Sky Road Songs (Yellowbird, 2012)

With others

- Horace Andy, Fresh (Island in the Sun 1987)
- Eszter Balint, Flicker (Scratchie, 1998)
- Samm Bennett, The Big Off (Factory Outlet 1993)
- Steven Bernstein, MTO Plays Sly (Royal Potato Family 2011)
- Brass Construction, Brass Construction II (United Artists, 1976)
- Henry Butler, Viper's Drag (Impulse!, 2014)
- Thomas Chapin, Insomnia (Knitting Factory, 1993)
- Elvis Costello The Sweetest Punch (Decca, 1999)
- Elvis Costello, When I Was Cruel (Island, 2002)
- Sheryl Crow, Sheryl Crow (A&M 1996)
- Will Downing, Moods (Mercury 1995)
- Marty Ehrlich, A Trumpet in the Morning (New World, 2013)
- Oran Etkin, Wake Up Clarinet! (Timbalooloo 2010)
- Oran Etkin, Gathering Light (Motema, 2014)
- Charlie Haden, Not in Our Name (Verve, 2005)
- Charlie Haden, Time/Life (Impulse!, 2016)
- Gunter Hampel, Fresh Heat: Live at Sweet Basil (Birth, 1985)
- Joel Harrison, Infinite Possibility (Sunnyside, 2013)
- Levon Helm, It's Showtime (Vanguard, 2014)
- Paul Hemmings, The Blues and the Abstract (Uke Leading Tone 2015)
- Colm Mac Con Iomaire, And Now the Weather (Plateau, 2015)
- Iron and Wine, Ghost on Ghost (Nonesuch, 2013)
- Freedy Johnston, Blue Days Black Nights (Elektra, 1999)
- Brad Jones, Uncivilized Poise (Knitting Factory, 1999)
- King Short Shirt, Press On (A&B, 1979)
- Billy Martin, Heels Over Head (Amulet, 2013)
- Cibo Matto, Super Relax (Warner Bros., 1997)
- Bobby Previte, Counterclockwise (Palmetto, 2003)
- Jeb Loy Nichols, As the Rain (Capitol, 1997)
- Jeb Loy Nichols, Lovers Knot (Capitol, 1997)
- Lou Reed, Berlin (Lumiere, 2008)
- Lou Reed, Berlin: Live at St. Ann's Warehouse (Matador/Sister Ray 2008)
- Max Romeo, Freedom Street (Island in the Sun 1984)
- Harry Shearer, It Must Have Been Something I Said (Rhino, 1994)
- Andy Summers, Peggy's Blue Skylight (BMG, 2000)
- Henry Threadgill, Spirit of Nuff...Nuff (Black Saint, 1991)
- Kazutoki Umezu, Eclecticism (Knitting Factory, 1993)
- Dan Zanes, Catch That Train (Festival Five, 2006)
- John Zorn, John Zorn's Cobra: Live at the Knitting Factory (Knitting Factory, 1995)
