= Down Home (Joey Baron album) =

Studio album by Joey Baron
- Released: 1997
- Recorded: 1997
- Genre: Jazz
- Length: 45:16
- Label: Intuition; INT 3503
- Producer: Lee Townsend

Joey Baron chronology
Crackshot (1995)	Down Home (1997)	We'll Soon Find Out (1999)

Down Home is an album by the drummer Joey Baron, recorded in 1997 and released on Schott Music's Intition label.

== Reception ==
Professional ratings
Review scores
Source	Rating
AllMusic	4/5 stars
The Penguin Guide to Jazz Recordings	3/4 stars

In his review for AllMusic, Scott Yanow calls it "not quite a classic but certainly worthwhile". All About Jazz's Douglas Payne wrote: "Down Home, despite its brief 45-minute running time is, indeed, mighty fine; a hearty menu with plenty of meaty playing". In Jazziz, Michael Ross wrote: "On Down Home, Baron flips the coin and brings his Southern roots to the fore, with eight melodic, soul-jazz tunes full of groove... On this disc, Baron may eschew the falling-down-the-stairs percussion style that made him the darling of the avant-garde, but he is still composing melodies that are as daring as his chops".

== Track listing ==
All compositions by Joey Baron

1. "Mighty Fine" – 5:15
2. "Little Boy" – 8:52
3. "Wide Load" – 8:35
4. "The Crock Pot" – 5:06
5. "What" – 7:58
6. "Listen to the Woman" – 1:47
7. "Aren't We All?" – 6:40
8. "Supposing" – 1:03

== Personnel ==
- Joey Baron – drums
- Arthur Blythe – alto saxophone
- Bill Frisell – guitar
- Ron Carter – bass
