= Cymbals (album) =

Studio album by Vinicius Cantuária
- Released: 2008
- Recorded: New York
- Label: Naïve
- Producer: Vinicius Cantuária

Vinicius Cantuária chronology
Silva (2005)	Cymbals (2008)	Samba Carioca (2010)

Cymbals is an album by guitarist Vinicius Cantuária.

== Music and recording ==
Cantuária produced the album. He also wrote or co-wrote nine of the compositions. The album was recorded in New York and released in 2008.

== Reception ==
The Guardian's reviewer commented that "You could trawl through acres of supposedly 'sexy' Brazil chill albums without finding tracks as good as the 11 songs on this entirely delightful album". The AllMusic reviewer concluded that, "For all of its originality and innovation, and its juxtaposition of traditions and integration of melodies and genres, Cymbals is far from a difficult listen."

Professional ratings
Review scores
Source	Rating
AllMusic	4/5 stars
The Guardian	4/5 stars

== Track listing ==
1. "Galope"
2. "Voce E Eu"
3. "Chuva"
4. "Vivo Sonhando"
5. "Voce Esta Sumindo"
6. "Prantos"
7. "O Batuque"
8. "Ominara"
9. "Tua Cara"
10. "Champs De Mars"
11. "To You"

== Personnel ==
- Vinicius Cantuária – guitar, percussion
- Brad Mehldau – piano
- Marc Ribot – guitar
- Jenny Scheinman – violin
- Erik Friedlander – cello
- David Binney – alto saxophone
- Marivaldo Dos Santos – percussion
