= Blues Dream =

Studio album by Bill Frisell
- Released: January 30, 2001
- Genre: Jazz fusion, folk jazz, Americana
- Length: 61:58
- Label: Elektra Nonesuch
- Producer: Lee Townsend

Bill Frisell chronology
Ghost Town (2000)	Blues Dream (2001)	With Dave Holland and Elvin Jones (2001)

Blues Dream is the 13th album by Bill Frisell to be released on the Elektra Nonesuch label. It was released in 2001 and features performances by Frisell, steel guitarist Greg Leisz, trumpeter Ron Miles, alto saxophonist Billy Drewes, trombonist Curtis Fowlkes, bassist David Piltch and drummer Kenny Wollesen. The cover photograph was taken by George A. Tice in 1974 at Kresson Road, Cherry Hill, New Jersey.

== Reception ==
Professional ratings
Aggregate scores
Source	Rating
Metacritic	86/100
Review scores
Source	Rating
AllMusic	3.5/5 stars
The Penguin Guide to Jazz Recordings	3/4 stars

Response was positive, with Metacritic assigned album an aggregate score of 86 out of 100 based on 7 critical reviews indicating "Universal Acclaim". The AllMusic review by Ronnie D. Lankford Jr. awarded the album 3.5 stars, stating, "Blues Dream is a perfectly chosen title: the material, steeped in the blues, is approached in a lazy, dreamlike fashion. Frisell's fondness for putting unusual combinations of instruments together adds to the overall effect, leaving the listener to wonder why no one has ever tried this before. Blues Dream is a lovely release that should satisfy Frisell fans as well as jazz, country, and blues fans looking for a genre-bending experience.". PopMatters' Will Layman said "Blues Dream is a movie for your ears, a soundtrack for your passage through a daydream, a kind of classical music even: a set of most careful compositions that orchestrate sounds beyond our imaginations. Blues Dream moves from beautiful to strange and back again. But it’s a classic". In JazzTimes, Bill Shoemaker was less enthused, writing, "Certainly, Blues Dream will reinforce the media consensus that Frisell is an American original. However, this is a strangely antiseptic album. ... Yet Blues Dream is not a compelling album. ... It’s a pat atmosphere only occasionally disrupted by a busy loop or a blast of distortion from Frisell, or a raucous horn statement".

== Track listing ==
All compositions by Bill Frisell.

1. "Blues Dream" – 2:31
2. "Ron Carter" – 6:45
3. "Pretty Flowers Were Made for Blooming" – 3:20
4. "Pretty Stars Were Made to Shine" – 1:45
5. "Where Do We Go?" – 5:21
6. "Like Dreamers Do (Part One)" – 1:34
7. "Like Dreamers Do (Part Two)" – 2:37
8. "Outlaws" – 4:19
9. "What Do We Do?" – 7:08
10. "Episode" – 0:49
11. "Soul Merchant" – 2:42
12. "Greg Leisz" – 6:14
13. "The Tractor" – 2:27
14. "Fifty Years" – 1:31
15. "Slow Dance" – 3:11
16. "Things Will Never Be the Same" – 4:49
17. "Dream On" – 3:06
18. "Blues Dream (Reprise)" – 1:53

== Personnel ==
- Bill Frisell – guitars
- Greg Leisz – steel guitar, mandolin
- Ron Miles – trumpet
- Billy Drewes – alto saxophone
- Curtis Fowlkes – trombone
- David Piltch – bass
- Kenny Wollesen – drums
