= Quartet (Bill Frisell album) =

Studio album by Bill Frisell
- Released: 1996
- Studio: Möbius Music, San Francisco
- Genre: Jazz, post-bop, film soundtrack
- Length: 61:36
- Label: Elektra Nonesuch
- Producer: Lee Townsend

Bill Frisell chronology
Live (1995)	Quartet (1996)	Nashville (1997)

Quartet (1996) is the eleventh album by American jazz guitarist Bill Frisell, and his ninth to be released on the Elektra Nonesuch label. The album features performances by Frisell, trumpeter Ron Miles, trombonist Curtis Fowlkes and violinist/tuba player Eyvind Kang.

Most of the songs were written for film or television, but rearranged for Quartet. Tracks 1, 5, 6, 7, 9, and 12 are from Gary Larson's Tales from the Far Side (1994), an animated television special created by Gary Larson. Tracks 3 and 13 are from the Italian film La scuola (1995) directed by Daniele Luchetti. Tracks 4 and 10 were written for the Buster Keaton film Convict 13 (1920).

== Reception ==
The AllMusic review by Scott Yanow awarded the album 4 stars, stating, "This CD uses a rather unusual instrumentation, a quartet composed of Frisell, trumpeter Ron Miles, trombonist Curtis Fowlkes and Eyvind Kang, who doubles on violin and tuba. Ten of the 13 Frisell originals on the release were originally written for films (including one for Gary Larson, "Tales from the Far Side," and one for a Buster Keaton movie "Convict 13"), and the resulting music is tightly arranged yet spontaneous, episodic, and sometimes a bit nutty, but also strangely logical. Whether it be the old-timey theme to "Dead Ranch," the blues in "Convict 13," a few somber ballads, or hints at early Duke Ellington (particularly by Miles' wah-wah trumpet), this is a continually interesting, offbeat set."

Professional ratings
Review scores
Source	Rating
AllMusic	4/5 stars
The Penguin Guide to Jazz Recordings	4/4 stars

== Track listing ==
All compositions by Bill Frisell except as indicated.

1. "Tales From The Far Side" – 6:27
2. "Twenty Years" – 2:55
3. "Stand Up, Sit Down" – 5:37
4. "Convict 13" – 5:36
5. "In Deep" – 3:10
6. "Egg Radio" – 4:31
7. "The Bacon Bunch" – 4:26
8. "Prelude" (Frisell, Miles) – 1:36
9. "Bob's Monsters" – 8:44
10. "The Gallows" – 6:14
11. "What?" – 3:26
12. "Dead Ranch" – 4:27
13. "Coffaro's Theme" – 4:27

== Personnel ==
- Bill Frisell – electric and acoustic guitars
- Ron Miles – trumpet, piccolo trumpet
- Eyvind Kang – violin, tuba
- Curtis Fowlkes – trombone
