= Silent Comedy =

Studio album by Bill Frisell
- Released: February 26, 2013
- Recorded: December 2, 2012
- Studios: East Side Sound, NYC
- Genre: Jazz
- Length: 50:27
- Label: Tzadik TZ 7641
- Producer: John Zorn

Bill Frisell chronology
Floratone II (2012)	Silent Comedy (2013)	Big Sur (2013)

Silent Comedy is an album of solo guitar improvisations by Bill Frisell which was released on the Tzadik label in 2013.

== Reception ==
Professional ratings
Review scores
Source	Rating
Allmusic	3.5/5 stars

In his review for Allmusic, Thom Jurek notes that, "This set will most likely appeal to guitar and improv freaks, as well as Frisell's most devoted fans. That said, given its intimate nature, it should resonate wider and deeper than that. He is doing things – on the fly – with his electric guitar and effects boxes that feel more like a conversation with a listener than merely an expression himself for his own sake".

== Track listing ==
All compositions by Bill Frisell.

1. "Bagatelle" – 3:11
2. "John Goldfarb, Please Come Home!" – 8:51
3. "Babbitt" – 3:38
4. "Silent Comedy" – 2:02
5. "Lake Superior" – 4:34
6. "Proof" – 3:55
7. "The Road" – 5:20
8. "Leprechaun" – 3:41
9. "Ice Cave" – 6:38
10. "Big Fish" – 5:26
11. "Lullaby" – 3:14

== Personnel ==
- Bill Frisell – guitar
