= Unspeakable (album) =

Studio album by Bill Frisell
- Released: 2004
- Genre: Jazz fusion Soul jazz
- Length: 72:37
- Label: Elektra Nonesuch
- Producer: Hal Willner

Bill Frisell chronology
The Intercontinentals (2003)	Unspeakable (2004)	Richter 858 (2005)

Unspeakable is a 2004 album by American jazz guitarist Bill Frisell, his 22nd album overall and his 17th to be released on the Elektra Nonesuch label.

== Background ==
Unspeakable represented a stylistic shift by exploring R&B/funk rhythm and extensive sampling from obscure vinyl records, in contrast to Frisell's previous few albums emphasizing country, folk and blues music.

The album features performances by a core band of Frisell, Hal Willner on sampler and turntables, bassist Tony Scherr, drummer Kenny Wollesen, and percussionist Don Alias. Scherr plays second guitar on one song, and on another the band is joined by keyboardist Adam Dorn. Several songs feature a horn section (Steven Bernstein, Briggan Krauss, and Curtis Fowlkes) and/or a small string section (Jenny Scheinman, Eyvind Kang, and Hank Roberts).

== Awards ==
Unspeakable won the Grammy Award for Best Contemporary Jazz Album in 2005.

== Reception ==
The Allmusic review by Sean Westergaard awarded the album 4.5 stars, stating, "It's all quite accessible, but fans with delicate ears may be put off by some of the noisier moments on the album, like the keyboard sound on "Stringbean" or the guitar solo on "Old Sugar Bear." Other fans will be delighted to hear such a glorious din on a Bill Frisell record again. After so much of a similar thing, it's just great to hear Frisell being pushed in a new direction (and quite a fun one, at that). Recommended. ".

Professional ratings
Review scores
Source	Rating
Allmusic	4.5/5 stars

== Track listing ==
All compositions by Bill Frisell except as indicated.

1. "1968" – 4:35
2. "White Fang" (Frisell, Willner) – 5:39
3. "Sundust" (Willner) – 2:36
4. "Del Close" (Frisell, Eric Liljestrand, Willner) – 5:03
5. "Gregory C." (Frisell, Willner) – 5:38
6. "Stringbean" (Frisell, Liljestrand, Willner) – 5:57
7. "Hymn for Ginsberg" – 2:24
8. "Alias" (Frisell, Liljestrand, Willner) – 7:56
9. "Who Was That Girl?" – 4:50
10. "D. Sharpe" – 4:10
11. "Fields of Alfalfa" (Frisell, Bernstein, Liljestrand, Walter, Willner) – 3:38
12. "Tony" (Frisell, Scherr, Wollesen) – 3:37
13. "Old Sugar Bear" (G.A. Grant, Liljestrand, Willner) – 7:10
14. "Goodbye Goodbye Goodbye" (Frisell, Teddy Lasry, Willner) – 8:58

== Personnel ==
- Bill Frisell – guitars
- Hal Willner – turntables, samples
- Tony Scherr – bass, guitar
- Kenny Wollesen – drums
- Don Alias – percussion
- Steven Bernstein – trumpet
- Briggan Krauss – baritone sax
- Curtis Fowlkes – trombone
- Adam Dorn – synth
- Jenny Scheinman – violin
- Eyvind Kang – viola
- Hank Roberts – cello
