= The Intercontinentals =

Studio album by Bill Frisell
- Released: 2003
- Genre: World fusion Ethno jazz Folk jazz
- Length: 70:27
- Label: Elektra Nonesuch
- Producer: Lee Townsend

Bill Frisell chronology
The Willies (2002)	The Intercontinentals (2003)	Unspeakable (2004)

The Intercontinentals is the 16th album by Bill Frisell to be released on the Elektra Nonesuch label. It was released in 2003 and features performances by Frisell, Sidiki Camara, Vinicius Cantuaria, Christos Govetas, Greg Leisz and Jenny Scheinman.

== Reception ==
Professional ratings
Aggregate scores
Source	Rating
Metacritic	86/100
Review scores
Source	Rating
Allmusic	4.5/5 stars
The Penguin Guide to Jazz Recordings	3.5/4 stars

Response was positive, with Metacritic assigned album an aggregate score of 86 out of 100 based on 7 critical reviews indicating "Universal Acclaim". The Allmusic review by Thom Jurek awarded the album 4.5 stars, stating, "This is a remarkable album; its sets a new watermark for Frisell's sense of adventure and taste, and displays his perception of beauty in a pronounced, uncompromising, yet wholly accessible way".

== Track listing ==
All compositions by Bill Frisell except as indicated.

1. "Boubacar" – 6:13
2. "Good Old People" – 5:25
3. "For Christos" – 6:13
4. "Baba Drame" (Traoré) – 5:18
5. "Listen" – 6:47
6. "Anywhere Road" – 1:52
7. "Procissão" (Gil) – 6:43
8. "The Young Monk" (Traditional) – 2:23
9. "We Are Everywhere" – 7:06
10. "Yála" (Govetas) – 5:47
11. "Perritos" (Cantuaria) – 4:33
12. "Magic" – 5:54
13. "Eli" – 4:15
14. "Remember" – 1:36

== Personnel ==
- Bill Frisell – electric and acoustic guitars, loops, bass
- Sidiki Camara – calabash, djembe, congas, percussion, vocals
- Vinicius Cantuaria – electric and acoustic guitars, vocals, drums, percussion
- Christos Govetas – oud, vocals, bouzouki
- Greg Leisz – slide guitars, pedal steel guitar
- Jenny Scheinman – violin
