= Lágrimas Mexicanas =

Studio album by Vinicius Cantuária and Bill Frisell
- Released: January 25, 2011
- Recorded: 2010
- Studio: Fantasy Studios, Berkeley, California and Avast! Recording Co., Seattle, Washington
- Genre: World music
- Length: 41:08
- Label: Naïve
- Producer: Lee Townsend

Bill Frisell chronology
Beautiful Dreamers (2010)	Lágrimas Mexicanas (2011)	Sign of Life: Music for 858 Quartet (2010)

Vinicius Cantuária chronology
Samba Carioca (2010)	Lágrimas Mexicanas (2011)	Indio de Apartamento (2012)

Lágrimas Mexicanas is an album by guitarists Vinicius Cantuária and Bill Frisell which was released on the French Naïve label.

Professional ratings
Review scores
Source	Rating
AllMusic	4/5 stars
All About Jazz	4/5 stars

== Reception ==
The AllMusic review by Thom Jurek called it "a completely unique collection of songs that draws heavily from traditional Latin and Brazilian rhythms, and weds them to 21st century jazz improvisation and sonic effects in a luxuriant braid of colors, textures, styles, and languages" awarding the album 4 stars stating "Lágrimas Mexicana is an ambitious yet utterly accessible album ... It is at once warm, sexy, and visionary. It presents two different yet very complementary artists in a collaboration that borders on brilliant". On All About Jazz Mark F. Turner noted "Influenced by New York City's diverse Spanish-speaking culture, the timing was right for Cantuária and Frisell, who had worked together in the past, to fully develop the project. Their unique hybrid, which includes improvisational music and songs with lyrics mixed in Portuguese, Spanish, and English, is at once intriguing, yet surprisingly mellow". In JazzTimes, Josef Woodard wrote "It may have been inevitable that Frisell would sooner or later turn his musical energies toward Brazil. Both Brazilian music and Frisell-ian music operate in the expressive areas where lyricism and experimental instincts meet and often thrive".

== Track listing ==
All compositions by Vinicius Cantuária and Bill Frisell

1. "Mi Declaración" – 7:03
2. "Calle 7" – 5:03
3. "La Curva" – 2:34
4. "Lágrimas Mexicanas" – 4:35
5. "Lágrimas de Amor" – 5:00
6. "Cafezinho" – 1:37
7. "El Camino" – 3:31
8. "Aquela Mulher" – 5:10
9. "Briga de Namorados" – 4:40
10. "Forinfas" – 1:55

== Personnel ==
- Vinicius Cantuária – vocals, percussion, acoustic guitar
- Bill Frisell – acoustic guitar, electric guitar, loops
