= Orchestras (Bill Frisell album) =

Studio album by Bill Frisell
- Released: April 19, 2024
- Recorded: December 30, 2021 - January 1, 2022 & September 23 and 24, 2022
- Studios: Muziekcentrum De Bijloke, Flagey, Teatro Mancinelli; 25th Street Recording, Oakland, CA; High Score Recording (mixing); Sterling Sound, Edgewater, NJ (mastering)
- Genre: Jazz
- Length: 1:26:41
- Labels: Blue Note Records; 5883733 2-CD / 5883740 2-LP
- Producer: Lee Townsend

Bill Frisell chronology
Four (2022)	Orchestras (2024)	Breaking the Shell (2024)

Orchestras is a studio album by American jazz guitarist Bill Frisell, featuring his usual trio backed by the Brussels Philharmonic and the Umbria Jazz Orchestra. Disc 1 was recorded on September 23 and 24, 2022 at De Bijloke, Ghent, Belgium and Flagey, Brussels, Belgium. Disc 2 was recorded from December 30, 2021 to January 1, 2022 at Teatro Mancinelli, Orvieto, Italy.

== Reception ==
Professional ratings
Aggregate scores
Source	Rating
Metacritic	84/100
Review scores
Source	Rating
AllMusic	4.5/5 stars
The Irish Times	4.5/5 stars
Jazzwise	4/5 stars
The Times	5/5 stars

AllMusic's Matt Collar stated, "Frisell marries intimate parlor jazz lyricism with wide-screen orchestrations [...] Rife with moments of artfully sustained anticipation, Orchestras is one of Frisell's most accessible and virtuosic recordings."

Glide Magazine commented, "[Michael] Gibbs knows Frisell's musical vocabulary and style as well as anyone and is responsible for these arrangements [...] that evoke Gil Evans [...] His lush canvasses gorgeously frame Frisell's trademark tone, natural melodicism, and unhurried phrasing. [...] Every tune here would be a candidate for a film score, much of the moody and dramatic material conducive to Hitchcock."

The Irish Times wrote, "Far from being a predictable soloist-with-strings project, Orchestras fully integrates guitarist, trio and ensembles into one multifaceted whole. [...] the arrangements seem to take on an entirely different dynamic and dimension; it's as if they are projections of Frisell's searching and sometimes mysterious musical imagination itself. [...] the philharmonic sounds lush, cinematic and darkly romantic; the jazz orchestra feels more earthy and laidback – there is a kind of easy dissonance to its mood."

John Fordham, writing for Jazzwise, stated, "The repertoire stretches from staples of Frisell's songbook such as 'Strange Meeting' (with its gently dreamy harmonies turning to softly early-rockish guitar tones) to a gently swinging, orchestrally-lilting 'Sweet Rain', which Gibbs originally wrote in the 1960s for Stan Getz. Striking versions of standard songs include a tonally gleaming but wistful 'Lush Life' and a chorally-textured and reverential 'Beautiful Dreamer'. [...] The Umbria tracks ... are invitations to Frisell and the trio to play harder, and for Gibbs' arrangements to foreground his enthrallingly Gil Evans-inspired use of high woodwind and trumpet exclamations, and resonant deep brass – a combination that furnishes many of the collection's standout moments."

Mojo wrote, "A few [tracks] sag under the weight of brooding brass and strings – 'Lookout For Hope', 'Doom' – but others soar – 'Beautiful Dreamer', 'Electricity', 'We Shall Overcome'. Ultimately it's a winner."

The Times called Frisell "consistent in style, applying his eerie, echoey vibrato to all forms of Americana from ancient folk to modern rock. Yet his music is as outward looking as it is reflective."

Uncut noted, "On the first LP, the 60-piece Brussels Philharmonic adds top-heavy accompaniment to his melodic playing. [...] On the second LP, however, the 11-member Umbria Jazz Orchestra sounds simultaneously nimbler and heavier."

The Wire said, "Orchestras must be the greatest album from a jazz composer since the glory days of Gil Evans."

== Track listing ==
All tracks are written by Bill Frisell except where noted; all tracks are arranged and orchestrated by Michael Gibbs except where noted.

Disc one (With the Brussels Philharmonic)
No.	Title	Writer(s)	Arranger(s)	Length
1.	"Nocturne Vulgaire"	Michael Gibbs		3:15
2.	"Lush Life"	Billy Strayhorn		5:08
3.	"Doom"	Ron Carter		4:47
4.	"Rag"			4:25
5.	"Throughout"			6:01
6.	"Electricity"			5:56
7.	"Sweet Rain"	Gibbs		5:58
8.	"Richter 858, No. 7"			7:03
9.	"Beautiful Dreamer"	Stephen Foster	Frisell; Gibbs	3:50
Total length:				46:23

- Recorded September 23 & 24, 2022, at De Bijloke, Ghent, Belgium, and Flagey, Brussels, Belgium
- Commission by Muziekcentrum De Bijloke, Flagey, and Brussels Philharmonic, in the series "Jazz Meets Symphonic"

Disc two (With the Umbria Jazz Orchestra)
No.	Title	Writer(s)	Arranger(s)	Length
1.	"Lookout for Hope"			7:11
2.	"Levees"			4:28
3.	"Strange Meeting"			6:24
4.	"Doom"	Carter		6:32
5.	"Electricity"			4:08
6.	"Monica Jane"			6:48
7.	"We Shall Overcome"	Traditional	Frisell	4:47
Total length:				40:18 1:26:41

- Recorded December 30, 2021 – January 1, 2022 at Teatro Mancinelli, Orvieto, Italy; additional recordings at 25th Street Recording, Oakland, California

== Personnel ==
=== Musicians ===
- Bill Frisell – electric guitar
- Thomas Morgan – bass
- Rudy Royston – drums

Brussels Philharmonic (disc one – 1.1–1.9):

- Alexander Hanson – conductor
- Judith van Eeckhout – artistic director (Brussels Philharmonic)
- Wouter Van den Eynde – principal flute
- Sarah Miller – flute, tutti
- Balder Dendievel – principal oboe
- Lode Cartrysse – oboe, soloist
- Anne Boeykens – principal clarinet
- Midori Mori – clarinet, soloist
- Marceau Lefèvre – principal bassoon
- Alexander Kuksa – bassoon, tutti
- Hans van der Zanden – principal French horn
- Mieke Ailliet – French horn, soloist
- Claudia Rigoni – French horn, tutti
- Ward Hoornaert – principal trumpet
- Luc Sirjacques – trumpet, tutti
- Guido Liveyns – principal trombone
- Yoran Ambroes – trombone, tutti
- Jean Xhonneux – tuba, soloist
- Gert François – principal timpani
- Eline Groslot – harp, soloist
- Jan Buysschaert – principal double bass
- Luzia Correia Rendeiro Vieira, Simon Luce, Thomas Fiorini – double bass, tutti
- Kris Hellemans – principal viola
- Griet François – viola, soloist
- Agnieszka Kosakowska, Hélène Koerver, José Miguel Almeida Freitas, Patricia Van Reusel, Philippe Allard, Thi Ngoc Phung Ha – viola, tutti
- Otto Derolez – violin concertmaster
- Bart Lemmens – violin 1, soloist
- Alissa Vaitsner, Annelies Broeckhoven, Anton Skakun, Christophe Pochet, Cristina Constantinescu, Dante Cáceres, Elizaveta Rybentseva, Justine Rigutto, Kristina Rimkeviciute, Olivia Bergeot – violin 1, tutti
- Mari Hagiwara, Samuel Nemtanu – principal violin 2
- Alexis Delporte, Aline Janeczek, Eléonore Malaboeuf, Francisco Dourthé Orrego, Julien Poli, Naoko Ogura, Sayoko Mundy, Véronique Burstin – violin 2, tutti
- Kristaps Bergs – principal cello
- Barbara Gerarts, Elke Wynants, Emmanuel Tondus, Kirsten Andersen, Sophie Jomard – cello, tutti

Umbria Jazz Orchestra (disc two – 2.1–2.7):

- Manuele Morbidini – conductor, alto saxophone, clarinet
- Pietro Tonolo – flute, alto flute, soprano saxophone
- Rossano Emili – tenor saxophone, baritone saxophone, clarinet, bass clarinet
- Pedro Spallati – tenor saxophone, soprano saxophone, clarinet
- Giovanni Hoffer – French horn
- Francesco Lento, Mirco Rubegni – trumpet, flugelhorn
- Glauco Benedetti – tuba
- Federico Pierantoni, Massimo Morganti – trombone
- Eva Zahn – cello

=== Technical ===
- Lee Townsend – producer
- Luke Jacobs, Perfecto Creative – design
- Brussels Philharmonic (1.1–1.9), Flagey (1.1–1.9), Muziekcentrum De Bijloke (1.1–1.9) – works commissioned by
- Jeff Kolhede – assistant and additional recording engineer (2.1–2.7), assistant mixing
- Claudio Venturelli (2.1–2.7), Marco Melchior (2.1–2.7) – live recording engineer
- Patrick Lemmens – live recording engineer, pre-mixing (1.1–1.9)
- Maarten Van Rousselt – management (Flagley jazz programmer) (1.1–1.9)
- Kristof Roseeuw – management (Muziekcentrum De Bijloke jazz programmer) (1.1–1.9)
- Greg Calbi – mastering
- Manuele Morbidini – music director (2.1–2.7)
- Brussels Philharmonic, Flagey, Muziekcentrum De Bijloke – producer (live concerts) (1.1–1.9)
- Annika Larsson Rugiano, Ava Szene, Francesco Chiocci, Stefano Lazzari – assistant producer (2.1–2.7)
- Adam Muñoz – additional recording engineer (2.1–2.7), mixing
- Claudia Engelhart – live sound technician
