= Nashville (Bill Frisell album) =

Studio album by Bill Frisell
- Released: April 29, 1997
- Recorded: September 1995–November 1996
- Studio: Sound Emporium (Nashville, Tennessee)
- Genre: Folk jazz New acoustic Progressive bluegrass Americana
- Length: 63:18
- Label: Elektra Nonesuch
- Producer: Wayne Horvitz

Bill Frisell chronology
Quartet (1996)	Nashville (1997)	Gone, Just Like a Train (1998)

Alternative cover

Nashville is the ninth album by Bill Frisell to be released on the Elektra Nonesuch label and his first to be recorded in Nashville, Tennessee. It was released in 1997 and features performances by Frisell, bassist Viktor Krauss, Jerry Douglas on dobro, Ron Block on banjo and Adam Steffey on mandolin, with guest appearances from Robin Holcomb on vocals and Pat Bergeson on harmonica.

== Reception ==
The Allmusic review by Jason Ankeny awarded the album 4½ stars, stating, "record is both genuine and alien – while played with real affection for the country form and without any avant posturing, its sound is original and distinct, a cinematic variation on C&W tenets".

Professional ratings
Review scores
Source	Rating
Allmusic	4.5/5 stars
The Penguin Guide to Jazz Recordings	2.5/4 stars

== Track listing ==
All compositions by Bill Frisell except as indicated.

1. "Gimme a Holler" – 5:02
2. "Go Jake" – 4:27
3. "One of These Days" (Young) – 4:51
4. "Mr. Memory" – 3:59
5. "Brother" – 6:03
6. "Will Jesus Wash the Bloodstains from Your Hands" (Dickens) – 3:09
7. "Keep Your Eyes Open" – 3:31
8. "Pipe Down" – 6:50
9. "Family" – 5:22
10. "We're Not from Around Here" – 4:22
11. "Dogwood Acres" – 5:28
12. "Shucks" – 4:15
13. "The End of the World" (Kent, Dee) – 3:32
14. "Gone" – 2:00

== Personnel ==
- Bill Frisell – guitar
- Viktor Krauss – bass
- Jerry Douglas (1-6, 9-10 & 12) – dobro
- Ron Block (2, 6, 8, 11, 13 & 14) – banjo
- Adam Steffey (2, 3, 6–8, 11, 13 & 14) – mandolin
- Robin Holcomb (3, 6 & 13) – vocals
- Pat Bergeson (2 & 8) – harmonica
