= Sign of Life: Music for 858 Quartet =

Studio album by Bill Frisell
- Released: April 26, 2011
- Recorded: September 27–October 16, 2010
- Studio: Fantasy Studios, Berkeley, CA
- Genre: Jazz
- Length: 53:23
- Label: Savoy SVY17818
- Producer: Lee Townsend

Bill Frisell chronology
Lágrimas Mexicanas (2011)	Sign of Life: Music for 858 Quartet (2011)	All We Are Saying (2011)

Sign of Life: Music for 858 Quartet is an album by Bill Frisell which was released on the Savoy label in 2011. The album features the same lineup that played on Frisell's 2005 album, Richter 858.

== Reception ==
Professional ratings
Review scores
Source	Rating
AllMusic	3.5/5 stars
All About Jazz	5/5 stars

In his review for AllMusic, Thom Jurek said, "Sign of Life is a curious, quirky, and deceptively low-key affair that is musically labyrinthine and ambitious; it's full of gorgeous spaces, textures, utterly instinctive interplay, and unexpected delight". Writing for All About Jazz, John Kelman stated, "It may not possess the hard surfaces and sharp edges that some believe are endemic to the creation of adventurous music, but Sign of Life is no less daring because of it. Filled with unexpected twists and turns that, after a number of revealing and rewarding listens, are clearly as much about 858's approach to the music as it is the music itself, Sign of Life continues Frisell's lifelong exploration of richly divergent—yet ultimately convergent—paths, drawn together in a myriad of permutations and combinations". The Independent's Andy Gill observed, "On Sign of Life, Frisell offers fragments of haunting melodies that seem to hang like mist; some have affiliations in folk and country music, some in jazz, some in classical; and they're all played by a string quartet in which one of the violins is replaced by Frisell's guitar, the players allowed to extemporise around the melodies as they see fit" In Stereophile Fred Kaplan wrote "Bill Frisell's Sign of Life (Savoy Jazz) is one of the most gorgeous new albums I've heard in a while ... There are traces of folk, bluegrass, minimalism, western-blues, as well as certain modes and improvisational cadences of jazz".

== Track listing ==
All compositions by Bill Frisell.

1. "It's a Long Story (Part One)" – 2:42
2. "Old Times" – 5:01
3. "Sign of Life" – 2:51
4. "Friend of Mine (Part One)" – 5:50
5. "Wonderland" – 3:20
6. "It's a Long Story (Part Two)" – 6:34
7. "Mother Daughter" – 2:22
8. "Youngster" – 3:03
9. "Recollection" – 2:56
10. "Suitcase in My Hand" – 2:24
11. "Sixty Four" – 3:54
12. "Friend of Mine (Part Two)" – 1:51
13. "Painter" – 1:16
14. "Teacher" – 1:30
15. "All the People, All the Time" – 2:07
16. "Village" – 4:22
17. "As It Should Be" – 1:52

== Personnel ==
- Bill Frisell – guitar
- Jenny Scheinman – violin
- Eyvind Kang – viola
- Hank Roberts – cello
