= The Sweetest Punch =

1999 album by Bill Frisell

The Sweetest Punch: The New Songs of Elvis Costello and Burt Bacharach Arranged by Bill Frisell

Studio album by Bill Frisell
- Released: September 21, 1999
- Genres: Pop, jazz
- Length: 64:09
- Label: Decca/Universal Classics
- Producer: Lee Townsend

Bill Frisell chronology
Good Dog, Happy Man (1999)	The Sweetest Punch: The New Songs of Elvis Costello and Burt Bacharach Arranged by Bill Frisell (1999)	Ghost Town (2000)

Elvis Costello chronology
The Very Best of Elvis Costello (1999)	The Sweetest Punch (1999)	For the Stars (2001)

Burt Bacharach chronology
Painted from Memory (1998)	The Sweetest Punch (1999)	At This Time (2005)

Professional ratings
Review scores
Source	Rating
AllMusic	3.5/5 stars

The Sweetest Punch is a 1999 album by Bill Frisell, released as a companion to Elvis Costello and Burt Bacharach's 1998 album Painted from Memory. Many of the earlier album's songs are featured with new arrangements by Frisell, mostly in instrumental versions.

Vocals for three of the tracks are also featured, with Costello on "Toledo", Cassandra Wilson on "Painted from Memory", and Costello and Wilson in a duet on "I Still Have That Other Girl".

== Track listing ==
All tracks are written by Elvis Costello & Burt Bacharach, except "Vamp Dolce", written by Bill Frisell.

No.	Title	Length
1.	"The Sweetest Punch"	4:44
2.	"Toledo"	5:25
3.	"Such Unlikely Lovers"	5:43
4.	"This House Is Empty Now"	5:03
5.	"Painted from Memory"	4:10
6.	"What's Her Name Today?"	4:58
7.	"In the Darkest Place"	5:55
8.	"Vamp Dolce"	3:25
9.	"My Thief"	4:31
10.	"I Still Have That Other Girl"	2:22
11.	"Painted from Memory" (Reprise)	3:36
12.	"Long Division"	3:59
13.	"Tears at the Birthday Party"	3:44
14.	"I Still Have That Other Girl" (Reprise)	1:52
15.	"God Give Me Strength"	4:42
Total length:		64:09

== Personnel ==
- Bill Frisell — electric guitar, acoustic guitar
- Brian Blade — drums, percussion
- Don Byron — clarinet, bass clarinet
- Billy Drewes — alto saxophone
- Curtis Fowlkes — trombone
- Viktor Krauss — bass
- Ron Miles — trumpet

== Charts ==
Chart (1999)	Peak position
US Top Jazz Albums (Billboard)	15
