= With Dave Holland and Elvin Jones =

Studio album by Bill Frisell
- Released: 2001
- Recorded: Spring of 2000, early 2001
- Genre: Jazz fusion, Americana
- Length: 66:38
- Label: Elektra Nonesuch
- Producer: Lee Townsend and Michael Shrieve

Bill Frisell chronology
Blues Dream (2001)	With Dave Holland and Elvin Jones (2001)	The Willies (2002)

With Dave Holland and Elvin Jones is the 14th album by Bill Frisell to be released on the Elektra Nonesuch label. It was released in 2001 and features performances by Frisell, bassist Dave Holland and drummer Elvin Jones.

== Reception ==
The AllMusic review by John Duffy awarded the album 3.5 stars, stating, "What can you expect but good things from a date featuring three players of such high pedigree. With Dave Holland and Elvin Jones representing the steadfast rhythm sections of old, and with Frisell's post-modern tones being among the finest voices moving jazz forward, a date like this should easily yield some classic moments. But Frisell comes up with only partial melodies and bare bones sketches for the band to play. Jones sounds at times utterly bored with his rhythm duties, desperate for a chance to stretch out. Frisell himself is often hesitant. Henry Mancini's "Moon River" and Stephen Foster's century-and-a-half old "Hard Times" together offer brief glimpses of levity, but cannot save the set entirely." The Penguin Guide to Jazz described the album as "A dull, sketchy, supergroup encounter, and Jones can rarely have sounded as lacklustre."

Professional ratings
Review scores
Source	Rating
AllMusic	3.5/5 stars
The Penguin Guide to Jazz	2/4 stars

== Track listing ==
All compositions by Bill Frisell except as indicated.

1. "Outlaws" – 7:55
2. "Twenty Years" – 3:15
3. "Coffaro's Theme" – 4:50
4. "Blue's Dream" – 4:49
5. "Moon River" (Mancini, Mercer) – 6:25
6. "Tell Your Ma, Tell Your Pa" – 9:06
7. "Strange Meeting" – 5:22
8. "Convict 13" – 3:54
9. "Again" – 7:32
10. "Hard Times" (Stephen Foster) – 3:39
11. "Justice and Honor" – 4:48
12. "Smilin' Jones" – 5:03

== Personnel ==
- Bill Frisell - guitars
- Dave Holland - bass
- Elvin Jones - drums
