= Ghost Town (Bill Frisell album) =

Studio album by Bill Frisell
- Released: March 7, 2000
- Studio: O'Henry Sound (Burbank, California)
- Genre: Folk jazz, new acoustic, chamber jazz, Americana
- Length: 62:47
- Label: Elektra Nonesuch
- Producer: Lee Townsend

Bill Frisell chronology
The Sweetest Punch (1999)	Ghost Town (2000)	Blues Dream (2001)

Ghost Town is the 12th album by Bill Frisell to be released on the Elektra Nonesuch label. It was released in 1999 and is the first album featuring solo performances, overdubs and loops, by Frisell.

== Reception ==
The AllMusic review by Rick Anderson states: "To call the music he creates on this album "introspective" would be something of an understatement... there's a darkness around the edges this time out that is unusual, as if he's lonely playing by himself and a little bit unnerved at the thoughts and feelings he's being forced to face on his own... There are moments of light relief, such as the gently lovely title track and the brief banjo interlude "Fingers Snappin' and Toes Tappin'," but the overall mood here is relatively dark, though consistently beautiful."

Professional ratings
Review scores
Source	Rating
AllMusic	4/5 stars
The Encyclopedia of Popular Music	4/5 stars
The Penguin Guide to Jazz Recordings	3.5/4 stars

== Track listing ==
All compositions by Bill Frisell except as indicated.

1. "Tell Your Ma, Tell Your Pa" – 5:18
2. "Ghost Town/Poem for Eva" – 6:33
3. "Wildwood Flower" (Carter) – 6:28
4. "Creep" – 0:46
5. "Variation on a Theme (Tales from the Far Side)" – 5:44
6. "Follow Your Heart" (McLaughlin) – 5:10
7. "I'm So Lonesome I Could Cry" (Williams) – 3:27
8. "What a World" – 5:00
9. "My Man's Gone Now" (Gershwin, Gershwin, Heyward) – 3:14
10. "Outlaw" – 3:20
11. "When I Fall in Love" (Heyman, Young) – 2:30
12. "Big Bob" – 2:48
13. "Winter Always Turns to Spring" – 5:33
14. "Justice and Honor" – 4:02
15. "Fingers Snappin' and Toes Tappin'" – 0:50
16. "Under a Golden Sky" – 2:04

== Personnel ==
- Bill Frisell – electric & acoustic guitars, 6-string banjo, loops and bass guitar
