= The Willies (album) =

Studio album by Bill Frisell
- Released: 2002
- Recorded: May 2000 and March 2001
- Studio: Flora Avenue Studio, Seattle, WA
- Genre: Folk jazz New acoustic Progressive bluegrass Americana
- Length: 66:15
- Label: Elektra Nonesuch
- Producer: Lee Townsend

Bill Frisell chronology
With Dave Holland and Elvin Jones (2001)	The Willies (2002)	The Intercontinentals (2003)

The Willies is the 15th album by Bill Frisell to be released on the Elektra Nonesuch label. It was released in 2002 and features performances by Frisell, Danny Barnes on banjo, pump organ & harmonica and bassist Keith Lowe.

== Reception ==
The AllMusic review by Zac Johnson awarded the album 3.5 stars, stating, "Anyone familiar with the guitarist's style will understand his choices in recording these timeworn love songs and murder ballads, and traditional folk aficionados will be intrigued to hear their old favorites in this new environment. ". Chris Dahlen of Pitchfork commented, "...The Willies is serviceable, but it isn't the shit-kicking great time that it should be. It makes Frisell seem like the guy at the party who's scared to get drunk and break the host's furniture; and we know he has more bluegrass in him thar that."

Professional ratings
Review scores
Source	Rating
AllMusic	3.5/5 stars
Pitchfork	7/10
The Penguin Guide to Jazz Recordings	3/4 stars

== Track listing ==
All compositions by Bill Frisell except as indicated.

1. "Sittin’ on Top of the World" (Lonnie Chatmon, Walter Vinson) – 3:59
2. "Cluck Old Hen" (Traditional) – 3:53
3. "Everybody Loves Everybody" – 3:42
4. "I Want to Go Home" – 4:15
5. "Single Girl, Married Girl" (A. P. Carter) – 3:57
6. "Get Along" – 3:23
7. "John Hardy Was a Desperate Little Man" (Traditional) – 5:17
8. "Sugar Baby" (Traditional) – 3:51
9. "Blackberry Blossom" (Traditional) – 4:20
10. "If I Could I Surely Would" – 6:46
11. "Cluck Old Hen" (reprise) (Traditional) – 1:50
12. "Cold, Cold Heart" (Hank Williams) – 2:25
13. "I Know You Care" – 3:12
14. "Goodnight Irene" (Lead Belly, John A. Lomax) – 3:55
15. "Big Shoe" – 4:51
16. "The Willies" – 6:24

== Personnel ==
- Bill Frisell – electric and acoustic guitars and loops

“The Willies”:

- Danny Barnes – banjo, guitar, pump organ, bass harmonica
- Keith Lowe – bass
