= Beautiful Dreamers (album) =

Studio album by Bill Frisell
- Released: August 31, 2010
- Recorded: March–April 2010
- Studio: Fantasy Studios, Berkeley, CA
- Genre: Jazz
- Length: 63:17
- Label: Savoy SVY17799
- Producer: Lee Townsend

Bill Frisell chronology
Disfarmer (2009)	Beautiful Dreamers (2010)	Lágrimas Mexicanas (2011)

Beautiful Dreamers is an album by Bill Frisell which was released on the Savoy label in 2010.

== Reception ==
Professional ratings
Aggregate scores
Source	Rating
Metacritic	77/100
Review scores
Source	Rating
AllMusic	3.5/5 stars
All About Jazz	3.5/5 stars

The response was positive, with Metacritic assigning the album an aggregate score of 77 out of 100 based on six critical reviews indicating "Generally favorable reviews". In his review for AllMusic, Thom Jurek noted that, "While this trio is well known for using various effects in concert to expand its sonic palette, and jamming on various tunes for long periods of time, here the musicians are virtually a mirror image of that incarnation, playing with restraint, brevity, and melodic sensitivity... Ultimately, Beautiful Dreamers is a wonderfully balanced trio exercise". Writing for All About Jazz, Troy Collins stated, "Ethereal and spare, with periodic interludes of spry activity, the sixteen tunes that comprise the album are models of brevity and sonic restraint—yet hardly indicators of the trio's expansive diversity, as suggested by contemporaneous concert reports... Beautiful Dreamers fits seamlessly into the arc of Frisell's oeuvre, opening a new, albeit familiar chapter in his discography". JazzTimes's Bill DeMain observed, "this record doesn’t really sound much like jazz as much as compelling, emotionally resonant, genre-free music. Sure, it swings in places, and there’s some fiery improvisation. But after decades of trodding such a brave and singular path, maybe Frisell deserves his own genre. How about "friz"?"

== Track listing ==
All compositions by Bill Frisell except as indicated.

1. "Love Sick" – 1:04
2. "Winslow Homer" – 3:32
3. "Beautiful Dreamer" (Stephen Foster) – 3:02
4. "A Worthy Endeavor" – 5:24
5. "It's Nobody's Fault But Mine" (Blind Willie Johnson) – 4:34
6. "Baby Cry" – 6:21
7. "Benny's Bugle" (Benny Goodman) – 3:31
8. "Tea for Two" (Vincent Youmans) – 4:28
9. "No Time to Cry" – 1:36
10. "Better Than a Machine" – 2:49
11. "Goin' Out of My Head" (Teddy Randazzo, Bobby Weinstein) – 2:46
12. "Worried Woman" – 4:44
13. "Keep on the Sunny Side" (A. P. Carter) – 2:26
14. "Sweetie" – 4:28
15. "All We Can Do" – 6:16
16. "Who Was That Girl?" – 6:16

== Personnel ==
- Bill Frisell – guitar
- Eyvind Kang – viola
- Rudy Royston – drums
