= All We Are Saying =

All We Are Saying...

Studio album by Bill Frisell
- Released: September 27, 2011
- Recorded: June–July 2011
- Studio: Fantasy Studios, Berkeley, CA
- Genre: Jazz, Americana
- Length: 68:02
- Label: Savoy Jazz
- Producer: Lee Townsend

Bill Frisell chronology
Sign of Life: Music for 858 Quartet (2010)	All We Are Saying... (2011)	Floratone II (2012)

All We Are Saying... is an album by American guitarist and composer Bill Frisell that was released in September 2011. It consists of songs written by John Lennon, both as a member of the Beatles and as a solo artist, arranged and performed in Frisell's definitive style. The album also features violinist Jenny Scheinman, pedal steel and acoustic guitarist Greg Leisz, bassist Tony Scherr, and drummer Kenny Wollesen. The title comes from the first line of the chorus to Lennon's 1969 single "Give Peace a Chance".

== Reception ==
Professional ratings
Aggregate scores
Source	Rating
Metacritic	69/100
Review scores
Source	Rating
AllMusic	3/5 stars

Metacritic assigns All We Are Saying an aggregate score of 69 out of 100 based on 6 critical reviews, indicating "generally favorable reviews".

In his review for AllMusic, Thom Jurek awarded the album three stars, stating that "almost none of these 16 tunes are radical reinterpretations of Lennon's songs; most stick close to the original melodies even at their most adventurous." Jurek also writes:

Opener "Across the Universe," with its twinning of Frisell's electric guitar and Leisz's pedal steel as Scheinman's violin picks up the lyric melody and extrapolates its harmonic aspects, is indicative of the recording's M.O., offering a close examination of Lennon the composer. The interplay between the three principals is remarkable, such as on the intro to "Nowhere Man," where Scheinman's ostinato tenses up in advance of the changes, and Leisz grounds her fluidly while Frisell pulls his lower strings to wind up, allowing the track to begin then flow into more open areas without losing sight of the melody.

== Track listing ==
1. "Across the Universe" (Lennon, McCartney) – 5:53
2. "Revolution" (Lennon, McCartney) – 3:50
3. "Nowhere Man" (Lennon, McCartney) – 5:14
4. "Imagine" (Lennon) – 4:51
5. "Please, Please Me" (Lennon, McCartney) – 2:06
6. "You've Got to Hide Your Love Away" (Lennon, McCartney) – 5:10
7. "Hold On" (Lennon) – 3:56
8. "In My Life" (Lennon, McCartney) – 4:05
9. "Come Together" (Lennon, McCartney) – 5:10
10. "Julia" (Lennon, McCartney) – 3:31
11. "Woman" (Lennon) – 4:21
12. "#9 Dream" (Lennon) – 3:42
13. "Love" (Lennon) – 2:18
14. "Beautiful Boy" (Lennon) – 3:27
15. "Mother" (Lennon) – 6:52
16. "Give Peace a Chance" (Lennon) – 3:38

== Personnel ==
- Bill Frisell – guitars
- Greg Leisz – steel guitar, acoustic guitar
- Jenny Scheinman – violin
- Tony Scherr – bass
- Kenny Wollesen – drums
- Lee Townsend – producer
- Adam Munoz – recording and mixing engineer
- Greg Calbi – mastering engineer
