= Vinicius Cantuária =

Brazilian jazz singer, songwriter, guitarist, drummer and percussionist (born 1951)

- Born: April 29, 1951 (age 74); Manaus, Brazil
- Genres: MPB
- Occupations: Singer, songwriter, musician
- Instruments: Guitar, drums
- Years active: 1970–present
- Labels: Gramavision, Transparent, Bar/None, EMI, E1, Naïve, Verve

Vinicius Cantuária (born April 29, 1951) is a Brazilian singer, songwriter, guitarist, drummer, and percussionist. He is associated with bossa nova and Brazilian jazz.

Born in the Amazonian city of Manaus, Cantuária grew up in Rio de Janeiro and moved to New York City in the mid-1990s. His career spans several zones of Brazilian music. He founded the Brazilian rock group O Terço in the 1970s, released six solo albums in Brazil in the 1980s that include his hit songs "Só Você" and "Lua e Estrela", and pioneered the world of neo-Brazilian music with his first international album Sol Na Cara in 1996. He was part of Caetano Veloso's band A Outra Banda Da Terra from 1978 to 1983.

Since moving to the United States, Cantuária has been a leading figure in the downtown New York jazz and contemporary music scenes. His albums include collaborations with Arto Lindsay, Bill Frisell, Brian Eno, Laurie Anderson, Brad Mehldau, Marc Ribot, David Byrne, Ryuichi Sakamoto, and John Zorn.

In 1998, Cantuária contributed the song "Luz de Candeeiro" to the AIDS benefit compilation album Onda Sonora: Red Hot + Lisbon produced by the Red Hot Organization.

Cantuária has said that jazz, rock, and bossa nova are "three planets that move in one and the same orbit."

== Discography ==
=== As leader ===
- Vinicius Cantuaria (RCA Victor, 1982)
- Gávea de Manhã (RCA Victor, 1983)
- Sutis Diferenças (EMI, 1984)
- Siga-Me (EMI, 1985)
- Nu Brasil (EMI, 1986)
- Rio Negro (Chorus Estudio, 1991)
- Sol na Cara (Gramavision, 1996)
- Tucumā (Verve, 1998)
- Vinicius (Transparent, 2001)
- Live: Skirball Cultural Center 8/7/03 (Kufala, 2003)
- Horse and Fish (Bar/None, 2004)
- Silva (Hannibal, 2005)
- Cymbals (Naïve, 2007)
- Samba Carioca (Naïve, 2010)
- Lágrimas Mexicanas with Bill Frisell (E1, 2011)
- Índio de Apartamento (Naïve, 2012)
- Vinicius Canta Antonio Carlos Jobim (Song X Jazz, 2015)

=== As sideman ===
With David Byrne

- Feelings (Luaka Bop/Warner Bros., 1997)
- Look into the Eyeball (Virgin, 2001)

With Arto Lindsay

- O Corpo Sutil (The Subtle Body) (Bar/None, 1996)
- Mundo Civilizado (Bar/None, 1997)
- Noon Chill (Rykodisc, 1998)
- Prize (Righteous Babe, 1999)
- Invoke (Righteous Babe, 2002)

With Caetano Veloso

- Bicho (1977)
- Muito (1978)
- Cinema Transcendental (1979)
- Outras Palavras (1981)
- Cores, Nomes (1982)
- Uns (1983)

With others

- Laurie Anderson, Life on a String (Nonesuch, 2001)
- Chico Buarque, Francisco (Kardum, 1988)
- Dominique Dalcan, Ostinato (Island, 1998)
- Bill Frisell, The Intercontinentals (Nonesuch, 2003)
- Carl Hancock Rux, Good Bread Alley (Thirsty Ear, 2006)
- Jesse Harris, Sub Rosa (Cristal, 2012)
- Smokey Hormel, Smokey's Secret Family (2009)
- Angélique Kidjo, Black Ivory Soul (Columbia, 2001)
- Sean Lennon, Half Horse, Half Musician (Grand Royal, 1999)
- Los Super Seven, Canto (Columbia, 2001)
- Marisa Monte, O Que Você Quer Saber de Verdade (EMI, 2011)
- Taeko Onuki, Lucy (Eastworld, 1997)
- Mauro Refosco, Seven Waves (MA, 1999)
- Towa Tei, Sound Museum (Elektra, 1997)
- Ana Torroja, Pasajes de Un Sueno (2000)
- Marcos Valle, Vento Sul (2002)
- Nana Vasconcelos, Contaminaçao (1999)
