= Lee Townsend =

American music producer

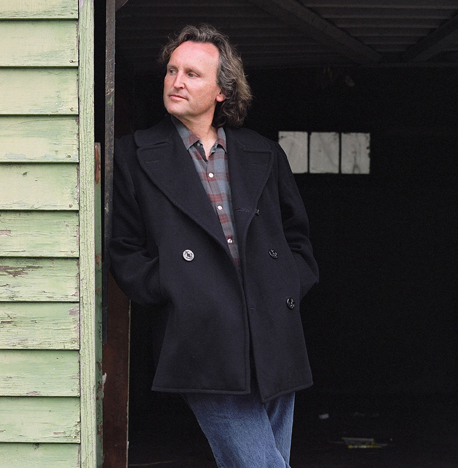

Background information
- Born: February 6, 1958 (age 68); Long Beach, California, U.S.
- Occupations: Record Producer, Artist Manager, Curator, Psychotherapist
- Years active: 1983–present
- Website: www.songtone.com

Lee Townsend is an American independent music producer, curator, artist manager and co-owner of Songtone (Songline/Tone Field Productions), specializing in recordings of singer-songwriters, contemporary composers, improvising musicians, and cross-cultural musical collaborations. He is also a psychotherapist in private practice in the San Francisco Bay Area.

== Background and career ==
Since 1983, Townsend has produced albums by Bill Frisell, John Scofield, Loudon Wainwright III, Kelly Joe Phelps, Rinde Eckert, Vinicius Cantuaria, Shweta Jhaveri, Dino Saluzzi, Gabriela Anders, Petra Haden, Viktor Krauss, Elvis Costello/Bill Frisell, Choying Drolma & Steve Tibbetts, Pat Metheny/John Scofield, Joey Baron, Charlie Hunter, T. J. Kirk, Dave Holland, Hank Jones, John Abercrombie, Jerry Granelli, Marc Johnson, Jonah Smith, Noe Venable, Crooked Still, Paul Dresher, Marty Ehrlich, Dusan Bogdanovic, Paul Sprawl, Blue Rubies, and Stephen Yerkey.

Townsend is a member of the cooperative group, Floratone, with Bill Frisell, Matt Chamberlain, and Tucker Martine. He has collaborated on motion picture soundtracks and theater music. Additionally, he has been producer of the Century of Song program for the Ruhr Triennale Arts festival in Germany, Vice President of Artists and Repertoire for Verve/Polygram Records in New York, General Manager and Director of United States Operations at ECM Records in New York, Producer of Music Programming at the Montalvo Arts Center in Saratoga, California, and a staff producer at National Public Radio affiliate, KCRW-FM in Santa Monica, California.

Townsend graduated from the University of California, Santa Cruz, majoring in psychology and earned his graduate degree in psychology from The Wright Institute, Berkeley.

== Discography ==
Bill Frisell

- Lookout for Hope (ECM, 1987)
- Before We Were Born (Nonesuch, 1989)
- This Land (Nonesuch, 1994)
- Go West: Music for the Films of Buster Keaton (Nonesuch, 1995)
- The High Sign/One Week (Nonesuch, 1995)
- Quartet (Nonesuch, 1996)
- Gone, Just Like a Train (Nonesuch, 1998)
- Good Dog, Happy Man (Nonesuch, 1999)
- Ghost Town (Nonesuch, 2000)
- Blues Dream (Nonesuch, 2001)
- With Dave Holland and Elvin Jones (Nonesuch, 2001)
- The Willies (Nonesuch, 2002)
- The Intercontinentals (Nonesuch, 2003)
- Further East/Further West (Nonesuch, 2005) Download-only
- East/West (Nonesuch, 2005)
- Frisell/Carter/Motian (Nonesuch, 2006) Download-only
- Bill Frisell, Ron Carter, Paul Motian (Nonesuch, 2006)
- Floratone (Blue Note, 2007)
- History, Mystery (Nonesuch, 2008)
- All Hat, (Universal, 2008)
- Disfarmer (Nonesuch, 2009)
- Beautiful Dreamers (Savoy, 2010)
- Lágrimas Mexicanas (Bill Frisell & Vinicius Cantuaria/E1, 2011)
- Sign of Life (Savoy, 2011)
- All We Are Saying (Savoy, 2011)
- Floratone II (Savoy, 2012)
- Big Sur (Sony, 2013)
- Guitar in the Space Age! (Sony, 2015)
- When You Wish Upon a Star (Sony, 2016)
- Music IS (Sony, 2018)
- Harmony (Blue Note, 2019)
- Valentine (Blue Note, 2020)
- FOUR (Blue Note, 2022)
- Orchestras (Blue Note, 2024)
- In My Dreams (Blue Note, 2026)

Bill Frisell/Elvis Costello

- Deep Dead Blue (Nonesuch, 1995)
- The Sweetest Punch (w/Cassandra Wilson) (Decca, 1999)

Petra Haden and Bill Frisell

- Petra Haden and Bill Frisell (True North, 2003/Skip, 2004)

Carrie Rodriguez

- We Still Love Our Country (Ninth Street Opus, 2010)
- Love and Circumstance (Ninth Street Opus, 2010)
- Give Me All You Got (Ninth Street Opus, 2013)
- Lola (Luz/Thirty Tigers, 2016)

Kelly Joe Phelps

- Slingshot Professionals (Rykodisc, 2003)
- Tap the Red Cane Whirlwind (True North/Rykodisc, 2005)

Loudon Wainwright III

- Here Come the Choppers (Sovereign Artists, 2005)

John Scofield

- Hand Jive (w/Eddie Harris) (Blue Note, 1994)
- Groove Elation (Blue Note, 1995)
- A Go Go (w/Medeski Martin & Wood) (Verve, 1998)
- Bump (Verve, 2000)

John Scofield/Pat Metheny

- I Can See Your House from Here (Blue Note, 1994)

Rinde Eckert

- Finding My Way Home (DIW, 1992)
- Do the Day Over (City of Tribes, 1995)
- Story In, Story Out (Intuition - Songline/Tone Field series, 1997)
- The Natural World (Songtone/National Sawdust, 2018)

Shweta Jhaveri

- Anahita (Intuition - Songline/Tone Field series, 1999)

Ani Choying Drolma/Steve Tibbetts

- Selwa (Six Degrees, 2004)

Dino Saluzzi/Anthony Cox/David Friedman

- Rios (Intuition, 1995)

Gabriela

- Detras del Sol (Intuition - Songline/Tone Field series, 1997)
- Viento Rojo (Intuition - Songline/Tone Field series, 1999)
- El Viaje (Intuition, 2006)

Vinicius Cantuária

- Vinicius (Transparent, 2001)
- Lagrimas Mexicanas (with Bill Frisell, E1, 2011)

Viktor Krauss

- Far from Enough (Nonesuch/2004)
- II (Back Porch/EMI, 2007)

Dave Holland

- Triplicate (ECM, 1988)

Hank Jones/Dave Holland/Billy Higgins

- The Oracle (Polygram, 1990)

John Abercrombie

- Getting There (ECM, 1988)

Joey Baron

- Down Home (Intuition - Songline/Tone Field series, 1997)
- We'll Soon Find Out (Intuition - Songline/Tone Field series, 2000)

Charlie Hunter

- Bing, Bing, Bing! (Blue Note, 1995)
- Ready...Set...Shango (Blue Note, 1996)
- Natty Dread (Blue Note, 1997)
- Return of the Candyman (Blue Note, 1998)
- Friends Seen and Unseen (Ropeadope, 2004)

T. J. Kirk

- T. J. Kirk (Warner Bros., 1995)
- If Four Was One (Warner Bros., 1996)

Marc Johnson

- Right Brain Patrol (JMT, 1992)
- The Sound of Summer Running (Verve, 1998)

Jerry Granelli

- A Song I Thought I Heard Buddy Sing (ITM, 1993)
- Another Place (Intuition, 1994)
- News from the Street (Intuition, 1995)
- Broken Circle (Intuition - Songline/Tone Field series, 1996)
- Sand Hills Reunion (Songlines, 2004)
- Dance Hall (Justin Time, 2017)

Crooked Still

- Shaken By a Low Sound (Signature Sounds, 2006)

Jonah Smith

- Jonah Smith (Relix, 2006)

Doug Wamble

- Doug Wamble (Blue Note, 2009)

Dusan Bogdanovic

- Early to Rise (Palo Alto, 1984)
- Yano Mori (Intuition - Songline/Tone Field series, 1999)

Quentin Dujardin

- Distances (Agua, 2012)
- Saison Orange (Agua, 2025)

David Soler Denga

- Botanicas (David Soler, 2012)

Kalaban Coura

- Kalaban Coura (Agua Music, 2011)

Blame Sally

- Night of 1000 Stars (Ninth Street Opus, 2009)

Noe Venable

- No Curses Here (Intuition - Songline/Tone Field series, 1999)

Real Vocal String Quartet

- Four Little Sisters (Irene Sazer, Flower Note Publishing, Alisa Rose, 2012)

Paul Sprawl

- Blue Suitcase (Intuition - Songline/Tone Field series, 1999)

Will Bernard

- Medicine Hat (Verve/Antilles, 1998)

Pothole

- Dirty Picnic (Intuition - Songline/Tone Field series, 1997)

Stephen Yerkey

- Confidence, Man (Heyday, 1994)

Zubot and Dawson

- Chicken Scratch (True North, 2002)

Laughing Stock

- Underskin (Poor Me, 2003)

Fred Hersch/Bill Frisell

- Songs We Know' (Nonesuch, 1998)

Living Daylights

- Electric Rosary (Liquid City, 2000)
