= Jenny Scheinman =

American jazz violinist

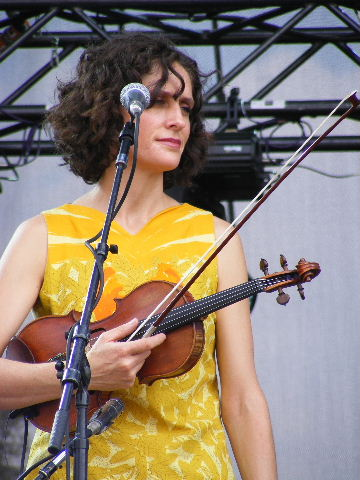
- Scheinman at the Austin City Limits Festival, 2008

Background information
- Born: May 17, 1973 (age 53); San Francisco, California, U.S.
- Genres: Jazz, country, folk
- Occupations: Musician, singer, songwriter, producer
- Instrument: Violin
- Labels: Avant, Tzadik, Cryptogramophone
- Website: www.jennyscheinman.com

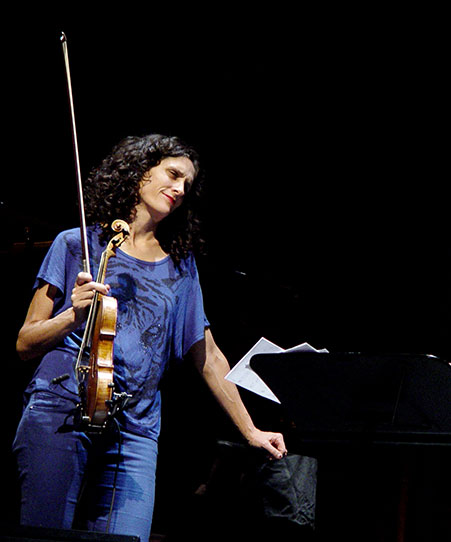
Jenny Scheinman At Reykjavik Jazz Festival 2015

Jenny Scheinman is an American jazz violinist. She has produced several critically acclaimed solo albums, including 12 Songs, named one of the Top Ten Albums of 2005 by The New York Times. She has played with Linda Perry, Norah Jones, Nels Cline, Lou Reed, Ani Difranco, Bruce Cockburn, Aretha Franklin, Lucinda Williams, Bono, Bill Frisell, the Hot Club of San Francisco, and Allison Miller.

In 2008 Scheinman released a self-titled vocal album. She has also played with her friend, Sean Lennon, on the Late Show with David Letterman. Her playing is frequently used as soundbed for NPR programming. Her album Mischief & Mayhem features guitarist Nels Cline, drummer Jim Black, and bassist Todd Sickafoose.

== Early life ==
Scheinman grew up near Petrolia in Humboldt County, California, and played folk music with her family. She is the niece of robotics pioneer Victor Scheinman and the granddaughter of Telford Taylor, chief prosecutor at the United States war crimes trials at Nuremberg. She studied at the Oberlin Conservatory of Music before transferring to the University of California, Berkeley, where she graduated with a degree in English literature in 1995. She began performing professionally in California and played with the Hot Club of San Francisco.

== Career ==
Scheinman moved from the San Francisco Bay Area to Brooklyn in 1999 and held a residency at Barbès. She performed and recorded with guitarist Bill Frisell, accompanied singers including Norah Jones and Lucinda Williams, and wrote and performed string arrangements for Lou Reed and Metallica.

Her recordings as a leader include Live at Yoshi's, recorded in Oakland in 1999 and released in 2000, and 12 Songs (2005). In 2008 she released two albums: Crossing the Field, an instrumental recording with Frisell, pianist Jason Moran, and a string orchestra, and Jenny Scheinman, her first album to feature her singing prominently. The latter includes original songs and covers of folk, country, and blues material.

For Mischief & Mayhem (2012), Scheinman led a quartet with guitarist Nels Cline, bassist Todd Sickafoose, and drummer Jim Black. The same year she moved back to Northern California. On The Littlest Prisoner (2014), she sang and played violin in a trio with Frisell and drummer Brian Blade.

Scheinman composed a live score for Kannapolis: A Moving Portrait, a collaboration with filmmaker Finn Taylor that premiered at Duke University in 2015. The project used archival footage of small-town life filmed by H. Lee Waters between 1936 and 1942. The music was released as Here on Earth in 2017. In 2019 Scheinman and drummer Allison Miller co-led the quartet Parlour Game, with pianist Carmen Staaf and bassist Tony Scherr. The group released its self-titled album that year.

Scheinman drew on the landscape and wildlife of California's Lost Coast for All Species Parade, a double album released by Royal Potato Family in 2024. Frisell played in the core band, with Julian Lage and Cline joining on selected tracks. Her 2026 album One Hundred Years Today was inspired by a collection of postcards sent to her grandmother between 1926 and 1937. Scheinman composed much of the album on her grandmother's piano.

== Discography ==
- Live at Yoshi's (Avant, 2000)
- The Rabbi's Lover (Tzadik, 2002)
- Shalagaster (Tzadik, 2004)
- 12 Songs (Cryptogramophone, 2005)
- Crossing the Field (Koch, 2008)
- Jenny Scheinman (Koch, 2008)
- Mischief & Mayhem (self released, 2012)
- The Littlest Prisoner (Sony Masterworks, 2014)
- Here on Earth (RPF, 2017)
- All Species Parade (RPF, 2024)

With Ani DiFranco

- Red Letter Year (Righteous Babe, 2008)
- Allergic To Water (Righteous Babe, 2014)

With Bill Frisell

- The Intercontinentals (Nonesuch, 2003)
- Unspeakable (Nonesuch, 2004)
- Richter 858 (Songlines, 2005)
- History, Mystery (Nonesuch, 2008)
- Disfarmer (Nonesuch, 2009)
- Sign of Life: Music for 858 Quartet (Savoy Jazz, 2010)
- All We Are Saying (Savoy Jazz, 2011)
- The Kentucky Derby Is Decadent and Depraved (Savoy Jazz, 2012)
- Big Sur (OKeh, 2013)

With Eyvind Kang

- The Narrow Garden (Ipecac, 2012)

With Christian McBride

- Live at Tonic (Ropeadope, 2006)

With Allison Miller

- Boom Tic Boom (Foxhaven, 2010)
- No Morphine, No Lilies (The Royal Potato Family, 2013)
- Otis Was a Polar Bear (The Royal Potato Family, 2016)
- Glitter Wolf (The Royal Potato Family, 2019)
- Parlour Game (The Royal Potato Family, 2019)

With Madeleine Peyroux

- Standing on the Rooftop (Decca, 2011)

With Marta Töpferová

- Sueño Verde (Green Dream) (Circular Moves, 2003)
- La Marea (World Village / Harmonia Mundi, 2005)
- Flor Nocturna (World Village / Harmonia Mundi, 2006)

With Lou Reed and Metallica

- Lulu (Warner Brothers/Vertigo 2011)

With Rova Saxophone Quartet

- Electric Ascension (Atavistic, 2005)

With Lucinda Williams

- West (Lost Highway, 2007)
