= Bill Frisell =

American jazz guitarist (born 1951)

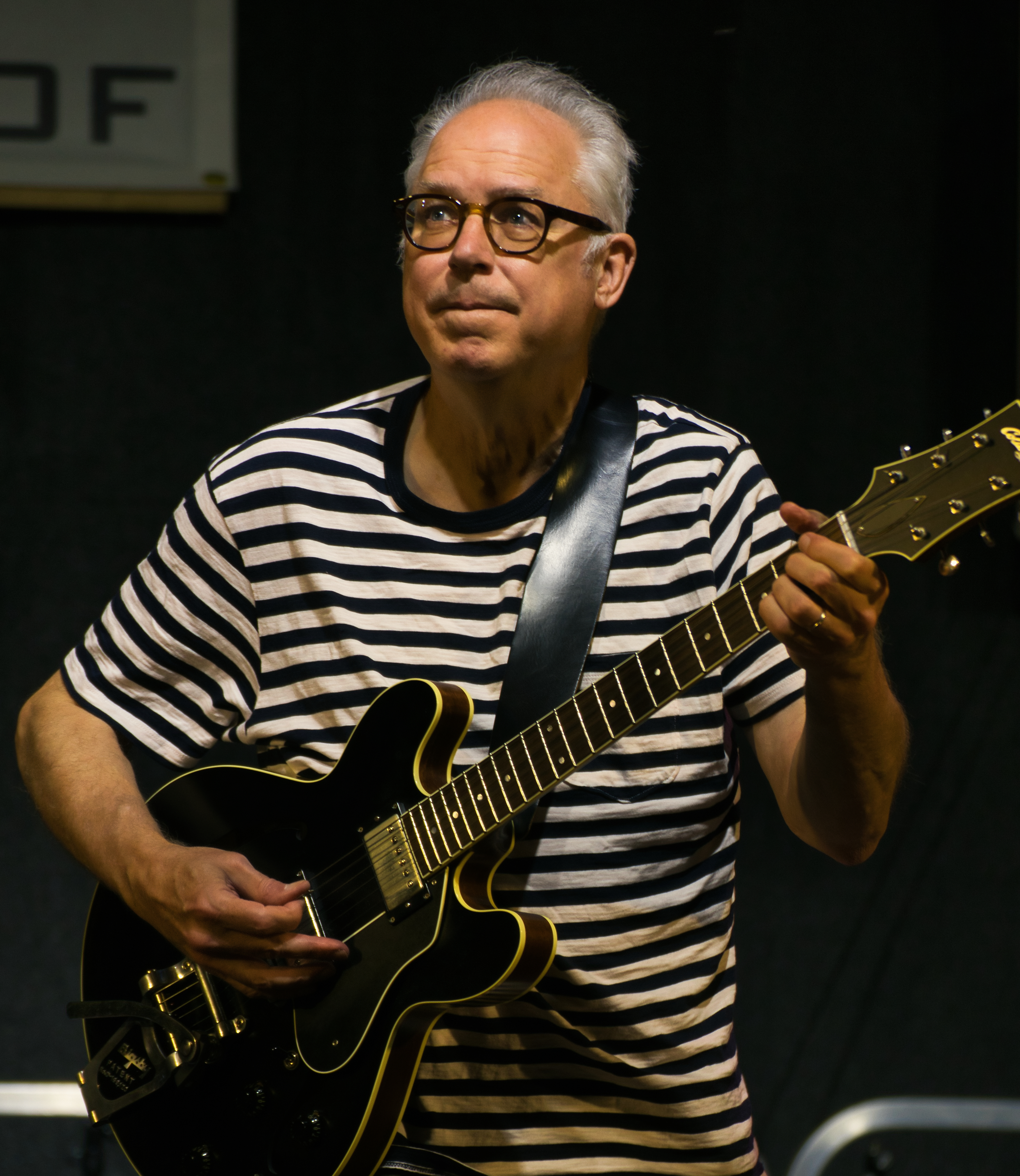
- Frisell in 2021

Background information
- Born: William Richard Frisell; March 18, 1951 (age 75); Baltimore, Maryland, U.S.
- Genres: Jazz; jazz fusion; folk jazz; Americana; classical
- Occupations: Musician; composer; arranger
- Instrument: Guitar
- Works: Discography
- Years active: 1978–present
- Labels: ECM; Elektra; Nonesuch
- Website: billfrisell.com

William Richard Frisell (/frɪˈzɛl/ frih-ZEL; born March 18, 1951) is an American jazz guitarist. He first came to prominence at ECM Records in the 1980s, as both a session player and a leader. He went on to work in a variety of contexts, notably as a participant in the Downtown Scene in New York City, where he formed a long working relationship with composer and saxophonist John Zorn. He was also a longtime member of veteran drummer Paul Motian's groups from the early 1980s until Motian's death in 2011. Since the late 1990s, Frisell's output as a bandleader has also integrated prominent elements of folk, country, rock 'n' roll, and Americana. He holds six Grammy nominations and one win.

== Biography ==
=== Early life and career ===
Frisell was born in Baltimore, Maryland, United States, but spent most of his youth in the Denver, Colorado area. He studied clarinet with Richard Joiner of the Denver Symphony Orchestra as a youth, but by his teens was more interested in guitar. He graduated from Denver East High School and went to the University of Northern Colorado to study music, specializing at first in clarinet, then switching to guitar after hearing a talk by guest artist Gary Burton, who recommended that students focus on a single instrument. At UNC, he took a class taught by guitarist Johnny Smith; however, Frisell later reported that the class effectively became private lessons from Smith because the emphasis on music theory "was too much for everyone else—they didn't want to be learning scales and inversions."

His original guitar teacher in the Denver–Aurora metropolitan area was Dale Bruning (b. 1934), with whom Frisell released the 2000 duo album Reunion. After graduating from Northern Colorado, Frisell attended the Berklee College of Music in Boston in the 1970s, where he studied with Jon Damian, Jim Hall, and Michael Gibbs, eventually earning a diploma in 1977.

In 1978, he moved to Spa, Belgium, where he played in a jazz band and focused on writing music; during this time he also did a UK tour with Michael Gibbs and recorded in West Germany as a sideman on the Eberhard Weber album Fluid Rustle (rec. January 1979). He relocated to the New York City area in 1979, remaining there until 1989.

=== ECM Records years ===
Frisell's major break came when guitarist Pat Metheny was unable to make a recording session and recommended Frisell to Paul Motian, who was recording Psalm (1982) for ECM Records. Frisell became ECM's in-house guitar player through the 1980s and worked on several albums, including notably Jan Garbarek's 1982 Paths, Prints. Frisell's first release under his name was In Line (1983), which featured a solo guitar as well as duets with bassist Arild Andersen.

=== New York City era ===
In the 1980s, Frisell moved to Hoboken, New Jersey and was active in the New York jazz scene. He forged an early partnership with John Zorn—including as a member of avant-garde jazz band Naked City—and performed or recorded with many others. He also played in Paul Motian's trio, along with saxophonist Joe Lovano.

Frisell organized a regular working group in the mid-1980s consisting of Kermit Driscoll on bass, Joey Baron on drums, and Hank Roberts on cello (later reduced to a trio when Roberts left). For studio projects, this group was regularly joined by other musicians.

=== Seattle years ===
In 1988, Frisell left New York City and moved to Seattle, Washington. In the early 1990s, Frisell made two of his best-reviewed albums: first, Have a Little Faith, an ambitious survey of Americana of all stripes, from Charles Ives and Aaron Copland (the entirety of Billy the Kid) to John Hiatt (the title song), Bob Dylan ("Just Like a Woman") and Madonna (a lengthy, psychedelic rock-tinged version of "Live to Tell"); and second, This Land, a complementary set of originals. During this time, he performed with many musicians, including up-and-coming performers such as Douglas September on the album 10 Bulls. He also branched out by performing soundtracks to silent films of Buster Keaton with his trio and contributed to Ryuichi Sakamoto's album Heartbeat.

In the mid-1990s, Frisell disbanded his trio. He continued the trend marked by Have a Little Faith by more explicitly incorporating elements of bluegrass and country music into his music. His friendship with Gary Larson led him to provide music for the TV version of The Far Side (released on the album Quartet along with music written for Keaton's Convict 13). In 1997, Frisell released the album Nashville on Nonesuch Records, which featured Jerry Douglas, Viktor Krauss, and members of Alison Krauss's band, Union Station. In 2000, Frisell moved to Bainbridge Island, Washington, near Seattle.

=== 2000 to present ===
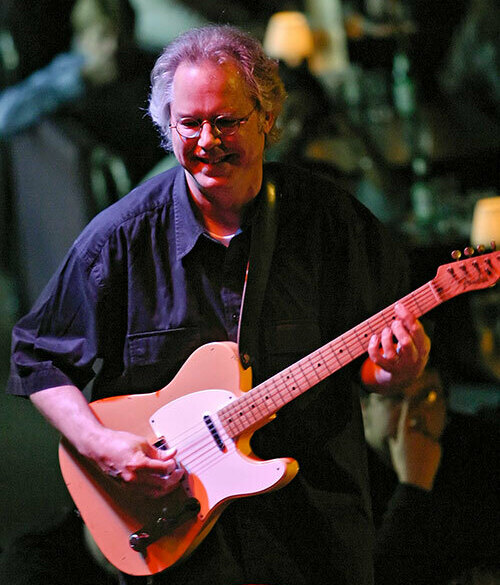
Frisell with the B3 Trio at Jazz Alley, Seattle, in 2004

Several of Frisell's songs, including his recording of "Over the Rainbow" and "Coffaro's Theme", originally composed in 1995 for an Italian movie, La scuola, were featured in the film Finding Forrester in 2000.

In 1999, Frisell was commissioned by the Walker Art Center in Minneapolis, Minnesota, to compose Blues Dream, which he premiered on November 15, 1999. He later recorded the work for a 2001 release on Nonesuch. Also in 1999, he released The Sweetest Punch, which featured a seven-piece jazz ensemble reworking the tunes written and recorded by Elvis Costello and Burt Bacharach on Painted from Memory.

Between 2003 and 2005, Frisell acted as musical director for Century of Song, a series of concerts at the German Ruhrtriennale arts festival (produced by Lee Townsend). Frisell invited artists including Rickie Lee Jones, Elvis Costello, Petra Haden, Jenny Scheinman, Suzanne Vega, Arto Lindsay, Loudon Wainwright III, Vic Chesnutt, Van Dyke Parks, Buddy Miller, Ron Sexsmith, and Chip Taylor to perform their favorite songs in new arrangements.

In 2003, Frisell's The Intercontinentals was nominated for a Grammy Award; he won the 2005 Grammy Award for Best Contemporary Jazz Album for his album Unspeakable. His 2008 album History, Mystery was nominated for a 2009 Grammy award for Best Jazz Instrumental Album, Individual or Group. Frisell was also a judge for the sixth annual Independent Music Awards to support independent artists careers.

In 2008, Frisell performed as a featured guest on Earth's album The Bees Made Honey in the Lion's Skull. The following year, Frisell was featured in a duet rendition of Leonard Cohen's "Hallelujah" with singer-songwriter Sam Shrieve—the recording was released on Shrieve's debut album, Bittersweet Lullabies.

In 2010, Frisell started working with the Savoy Jazz label and released Beautiful Dreamers in August 2010, then a second release of Sign of Life in April 2011. Also, on January 25, 2011, Frisell and Vinicius Cantuária released Lágrimas Mexicanas on the E1 label.

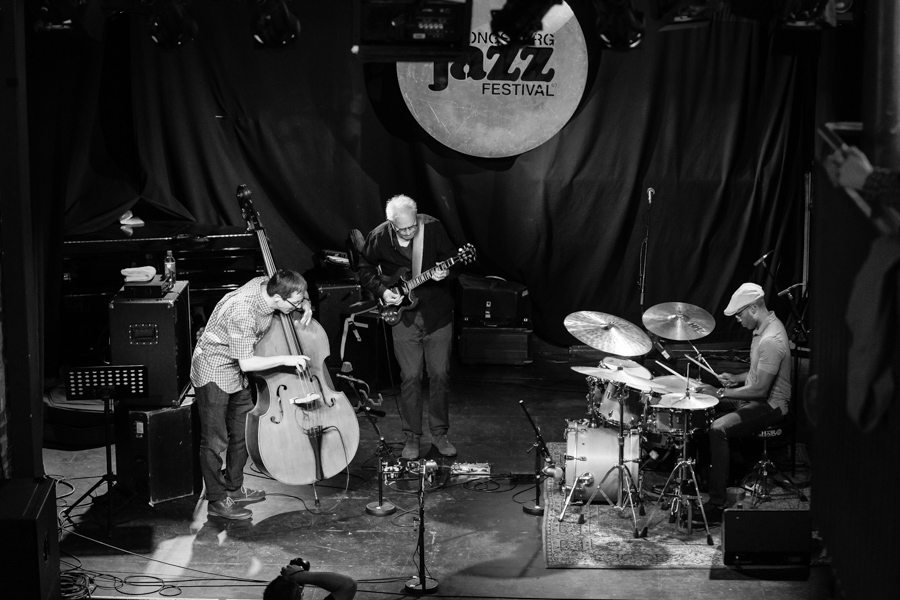
Frisell's trio at the Kongsberg Jazzfestival, 2019; Thomas Morgan (bass), Rudy Royston (drums)

In June 2011, Frisell, Lee Townsend, and their frequent collaborator, Cantuária, participated in TEDx GoldenGateED's program "Teaching Compassion" in Oakland, California. Frisell and Cantuária performed separately, and Townsend assisted with the technical aspects of the event. In September 2011, Frisell released All We Are Saying, a full-length offering of his interpretations of John Lennon's music. Frisell's quintet includes violinist Jenny Scheinman, pedal steel and acoustic guitarist Greg Leisz, bassist Tony Scherr, and drummer Kenny Wollesen. In 2017, Frisell received an honorary doctorate of music from his alma mater, the Berklee College of Music. Frisell has lived in Brooklyn since 2017.

In 2021, a video was recorded at the Village Vanguard in New York and was published by Blue Note Records on YouTube.

Bill Frisell, Beautiful Dreamer: The Guitarist Who Changed the Sound of American Music, a biography on Frisell written by Philip Watson, was published by Faber & Faber on May 24, 2022.

In 1982, Frisell married the visual artist and painter Carole d'Inverno (who he had met while living in Belgium), and they have one daughter, Monica. He owns 63 guitars.

== Discography ==
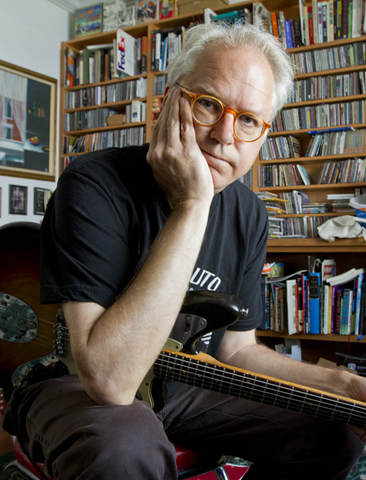
Frisell at his home studio, 2011

=== Albums ===
Title	Year	Label
In Line	1983	ECM
Rambler	1985	ECM
Lookout for Hope	1988	ECM
Before We Were Born	1989	Nonesuch
Is That You?	1990	Nonesuch
Where in the World?	1991	Nonesuch
Have a Little Faith	1992	Nonesuch
This Land	1994	Nonesuch
Go West: Music for the Films of Buster Keaton	1995	Nonesuch
The High Sign/One Week: Music for the Films of Buster Keaton	1995	Nonesuch
Live	1995	Gramavision
Quartet	1996	Nonesuch
Nashville	1997	Nonesuch
Gone, Just Like a Train	1998	Nonesuch
Good Dog, Happy Man	1999	Nonesuch
The Sweetest Punch	1999	Decca
Ghost Town	2000	Nonesuch
Blues Dream	2001	Nonesuch
With Dave Holland and Elvin Jones	2001	Nonesuch
The Willies	2002	Nonesuch
The Intercontinentals	2003	Nonesuch
Unspeakable	2004	Nonesuch
Richter 858	2005	Songlines
East/West	2005	Nonesuch
Bill Frisell, Ron Carter, Paul Motian	2006	Nonesuch
History, Mystery	2008	Nonesuch
Disfarmer	2009	Nonesuch
Beautiful Dreamers	2010	Savoy
Sign of Life: Music for 858 Quartet	2011	Savoy
All We Are Saying	2011	Savoy
Silent Comedy	2013	Tzadik
Big Sur	2013	OKeh
Guitar in the Space Age!	2014	OKeh
When You Wish Upon a Star	2016	OKeh
Small Town	2017	ECM
Music IS	2018	OKeh
Epistrophy	2019	ECM
Harmony	2019	Blue Note
Valentine	2020	Blue Note
Four	2022	Blue Note
Orchestras	2024	Blue Note
Breaking the Shell	2024	Red Hook
In My Dreams	2026	Blue Note
