= X's (album) =

Studio album by Cigarettes After Sex
- Released: July 12, 2024
- Recorded: August 2020 – February 2022 (Los Angeles)
- Genres: Ambient pop; shoegaze
- Length: 38:13
- Labels: Partisan; Spanish Prayers
- Producer: Greg Gonzalez

Cigarettes After Sex chronology
Cry (2019)	X's (2024)

Singles from X's
- 1. "Tejano Blue" Released: February 28, 2024; 2. "Dark Vacay" Released: April 16, 2024; 3. "Baby Blue Movie" Released: June 4, 2024

X's is the third studio album by American ambient pop band Cigarettes After Sex. It was released on July 12, 2024, through Partisan Records. Recording sessions for the album took place from August 2020 to February 2022 in Los Angeles. It was supported by the release of three singles, "Tejano Blue", "Dark Vacay" and "Baby Blue Movie", along with its accompanying world tour, the X's World Tour.

An ambient pop and shoegaze album, X's features ten tracks of music evocative of "slow-dance pop ballads" of the 1970s and 1980s. Upon release, X's received generally favorable reviews from critics. It debuted at number 32 on the US Billboard 200, making it the band's highest charting album on the chart to date.

== Background and promotion ==
Following the band's second studio album, Cry (2019), they released several singles which were recorded during the sessions of their self-titled album. On February 28, 2024, the band officially announced their third studio album X's. To support it, they simultaneously released its lead single, "Tejano Blue", and announced that they will embark on the X's World Tour throughout 2024 and 2025.

The band's lead musician Greg Gonzalez stated that the album "feels brutal" to him. The musician revealed how he actually had to "write" and "sing" about a loss (of a four-year relationship), instead of just talking about it which would simply "scratch the surface". Only then, he would be able to "learn from it" or "relive" it instead of just trying to forget about it. "Dark Vacay" was released as the album's second single on April 16, 2024. "Baby Blue Movie" was released on June 4, 2024, as the album's third single.

== Music and writing ==
An ambient pop and shoegaze album, X's sees Gonzalez exploring "slow-dance pop ballads" of the 1970s and 1980s, while the lyrics deal with romance and intimacy. Writing "Tejano Blue", the album's second track, Gonzalez was inspired by life in his hometown, El Paso, Texas, as well as Selena's "Como la Flor" and Cocteau Twins and "somehow" tried combining the sound of both artists.

"Hideaway" focuses on a specific moment in Gonzalez's life, when he and his girlfriend went to a beach near Marina del Rey, California to let their problems fade away. "Dark Vacay", the sixth track, is about someone Gonzalez fell in love with a long time ago and how they fell apart while travelling through Europe, eventually breaking up after. The title of its next track, "Baby Blue Movie", is a reference to softcore pornography and was primarily a reference to pornography before adding "Baby" onto the title. The final track, "Ambien Slide", uses a Tejano beat.

== Reception ==
Professional ratings
Aggregate scores
Source	Rating
AnyDecentMusic?	6.6/10
Metacritic	69/100
Review scores
Source	Rating
AllMusic	3.5/5 stars
Clash	8/10
The Independent	9/10
The Irish Times	3/5 stars
The Line of Best Fit	6/10
MusicOMH	3/5 stars
Sputnikmusic	3.8/5

X's received generally favorable reviews from critics. According to Metacritic, which assigns a normalized rating out of 100 to reviews from professional publications, the album received "generally favourable reviews" based on an weighted average score of 69, from five critic scores. Aggregator AnyDecentMusic? gave it 6.6 out of 10, based on their assessment of the critical consensus.

In a positive review, Tom White of The Independent proposed that X's is "made for late-night headphones moments" and added that it "shapes up to further cement [Cigarettes After Sex's] appeal". Writing for Clash, Matthew Mclister supposed that the album is "undeniably alluring from the off" and considered it to be the band's "most consistent" album. Heather Phares of AllMusic suggested that the album "frequently feels like some of their most personal work" and added that it "delivers enough glamorous brooding to keep fans happily miserable".

In Lauren Murphy's review for The Irish Times, she wrote that the album is "not the most dynamic album [to] hear in 2024", further stating that "after several listens [the album's] songs take on a meditative quality that becomes hypnotic and even enjoyable in places". Michael Hoffman of The Line of Best Fit said that Cigarettes After Sex "deliver[s] another set of songs that more or less could fit on any of their previous albums".

== Track listing ==
All tracks are written by Greg Gonzalez.

X's track listing
No.	Title	Length
1.	"X's"	3:33
2.	"Tejano Blue"	3:54
3.	"Silver Sable"	3:52
4.	"Hideaway"	4:37
5.	"Holding You, Holding Me"	3:30
6.	"Dark Vacay"	3:33
7.	"Baby Blue Movie"	4:05
8.	"Hot"	3:57
9.	"Dreams from Bunker Hill"	3:39
10.	"Ambien Slide"	3:33
Total length:		38:13

== Personnel ==
=== Musicians ===
Cigarettes After Sex

- Greg Gonzalez – vocals, electric guitar, acoustic guitar
- Randall Miller – bass
- Jacob Tomsky – drums

Additional musicians

- Jeff Kite – keyboards

=== Production ===
- Greg Gonzalez – production, recording
- Rocky Gallo – mixing
- Greg Calbi – mastering
- Steve Fallone – mastering

=== Artwork ===
- Randall Miller – graphic design
- Vance Wellenstein – graphic design
- Min Byung Hun – cover photo

== Charts ==
Chart performance for X's
Chart (2024)	Peak position
Australian Albums (ARIA)	32
Austrian Albums (Ö3 Austria)	9
Belgian Albums (Ultratop Flanders)	8
Belgian Albums (Ultratop Wallonia)	5
Croatian International Albums (HDU)	5
Dutch Albums (Album Top 100)	6
French Albums (SNEP)	24
German Albums (Offizielle Top 100)	7
Hungarian Physical Albums (MAHASZ)	23
Lithuanian Albums (AGATA)	19
New Zealand Albums (RMNZ)	32
Polish Albums (ZPAV)	11
Portuguese Albums (AFP)	7
Scottish Albums (Official Charts)	4
Spanish Albums (Promusicae)	31
Swedish Physical Albums (Sverigetopplistan)	3
Swiss Albums (Schweizer Hitparade)	10
UK Albums (Official Charts)	12
UK Independent Albums (Official Charts)	2
US Billboard 200	32
US Independent Albums (Billboard)	6
US Top Rock & Alternative Albums (Billboard)	10
