= JBM (disambiguation) =

JBM is a Canadian singer songwriter.

JBM may also refer to:

- the Journal of Basic Microbiology, an academic journal
- Jimmy Barry-Murphy (born 1954), Irish Gaelic footballer and hurler
- John Bowes Morrell (1873–1963), English author and historian
- J. B. M. Hertzog (1866–1942), Boer general during the second Anglo-Boer War
- Junior Black Mafia, (c. 1985–1992, a former Philadelphia-based organized crime syndicate
