= Deep Politics =

Studio album by Grails
- Released: 8 March 2011
- Genre: Alternative rock, experimental rock, post-rock
- Length: 46:46
- Label: Temporary Residence Limited

Grails chronology
Doomsdayer's Holiday (2008)	Deep Politics (2011)	Chalice Hymnal (2017)

Professional ratings
Aggregate scores
Source	Rating
Metacritic	81/100
Review scores
Source	Rating
AllMusic	4/5 stars
CMJ	3.5/5 stars
Filter	80%
Rock Sound	8/10
Pitchfork	7.9/10
PopMatters	8/10
Tiny Mix Tapes	3/5 stars

Deep Politics is the sixth studio album by American experimental rock band Grails, released on Temporary Residence Limited in 2011.

== Track listing ==
All songs written by Grails, except Track 2, which is written by Bruno Nicolai.

No.	Title	Length
1.	"Future Primitive"	5:29
2.	"All the Colors of the Dark"	4:08
3.	"Corridors of Power"	3:54
4.	"Deep Politics"	5:39
5.	"Daughters of Bilitis"	3:24
6.	"Almost Grew My Hair"	8:03
7.	"I Led Three Lives"	8:49
8.	"Deep Snow"	7:21
Total length:		46:46

== Personnel ==
Grails

- Emil Amos – drums, guitars, piano, synthesizers, vocals, lap steel guitar, tapes, additional recording, mixing (3, 5)
- Alex John Hall – electric guitars, Mellotron, Moog synthesizer, samples, additional recording, mixing (4, 7, 8), layout
- William Slater – bass, synthesizers, piano, vocals
- Zak Riles – twelve-string guitar (6)

Additional musicians

- Timba Harris – strings, string arrangements
- Ash Black Bufflo – synthesizers (7)

Production

- Jeff Stuart Saltzman – basic tracks recording engineer (2, 4, 6, 8), mixing (1, 4, 6)
- Brandon Eggleston – drums recording engineer (7)
- Carl Saff – mastering
