= Dolorean =

American rock band

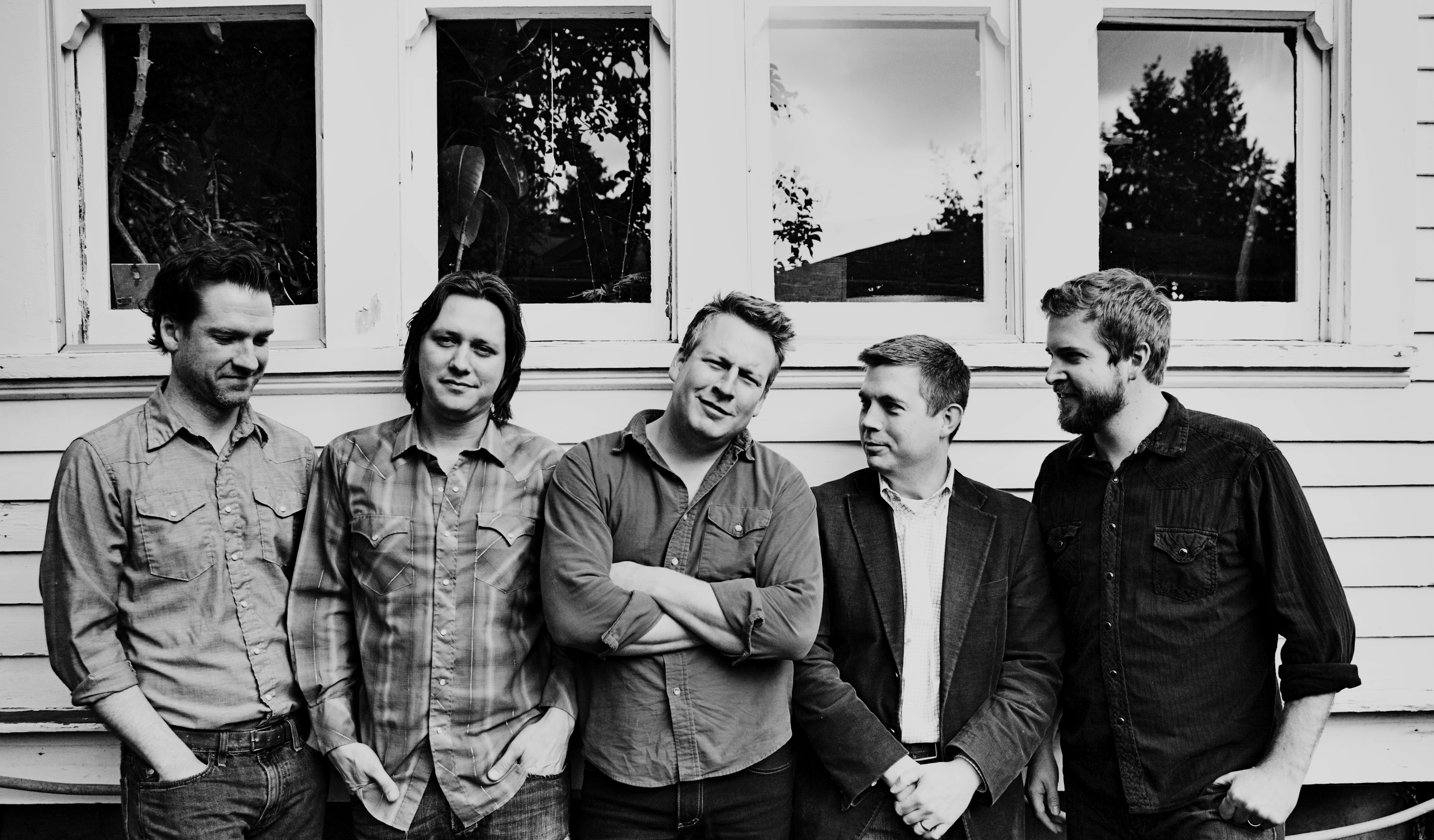

Background information
- Origin: Portland, Oregon, U.S.
- Genres: Alternative rock, indie rock
- Years active: 1999–present
- Labels: Partisan, Yep Roc
- Members: Al James, Jay Clarke, Ben Nugent, James Adair, Jon Neufeld
- Website: doloreanmusic.com

Dolorean is an American rock band based in Portland, Oregon. Their current line-up is Al James, guitar/vocals, Jay Clarke, organ/piano, Ben Nugent, drums/percussion/vocals, James Adair, bass, and Jon Neufeld, guitar. They have released four studio albums. Their most recent, The Unfazed, reached No. 41 on the Top Heatseekers chart. The group has worked with Portland area musicians such as Jay Clarke who records with Knitting Factory Records under the moniker Ash Black Bufflo, and Emil Amos who records on Partisan Records under the moniker Holy Sons.

== History ==
=== Early releases (2001–2003) ===
The band Dolorean was founded in 1999 in Silverton, Oregon. Local songwriter Al James asked arranger and pianist Jay Clarke to play on a "slew of his quiet, avant folk home recordings." After self-releasing an EP, Sudden Oak, and performing a number of shows around Oregon as a duo, by 2001 Dolorean had resettled in Portland. In Portland they added drummer/singer/arranger Ben Nugent, and according to Allmusic the band became a "fixture on the local literati scene," accompanying events such as poetry readings with an "understated sound." Dolorean began recordings its debut LP in 2001, with rock producer Jeff Saltzman providing the bass lines. Copies of the album were self-released by the band in the middle of 2002, though the official release came a year later in November 2003, when Not Exotic came out on Yep Roc Records. To perform the music live, James Adair joined the group on bass.

Allmusic gave it a glowing review and a score of 4.5/5, writing that "even with the addition of understated percussion, shimmering synth and piano, and stately cello, the record still runs on James' sharply rendered lyricisms and quietly deliberate guitar work." Pitchfork Media gave it a more mixed review and a score of 6.6/10. PopMatters praised the release: "the paring of Ben Nugent and Al James, along with some other seasoned people, has more of a dirge-like atmosphere."

=== Violence in the Snowy Fields ===
Their sophomore LP was recorded throughout 2003 and 2004, with the four members of Dolorean providing most of the arrangement and instruments. Guest artist Emil Amos also provided additional piano and guitar, while the album's producer, Jeff Saltzman, also provided guitar. Bruce Kaphan also contributed additional pedal steel guitar. On July 8, 2004, Dolorean released Bloodknot, an EP which contained four songs that were "voice and nylon string guitar versions" of tracks that would appear in Violence in the Snowy Fields. Later in the summer of 2004, Dolorean released a split 7-inch vinyl with Holy Sons. Released on October 5, 2004, on Yep Roc Records, Violence in the Snowy Fields received a favorable review from The A.V. Club, who wrote that the band's "first proper album, Not Exotic, floated through a melancholy alt-country haze, occasionally landing in places of crystalline beauty. The follow-up, Violence In The Snowy Fields, sounds more focused and song-oriented, but with no loss of the sorrowful atmosphere that was the band's initial selling point." The album generally received positive reviews, with Allmusic giving it a slighter lower score than the band's debut.

=== You Can't Win and hiatus (2005–2010) ===
In 2005, the band collaborated with fellow northwest musician Damien Jurado on a split 7-inch vinyl release. Dolorean covered Jurado's track "Ghost of David," while Jurado covered a Dolorean track. The vinyl only had 600 copies printed by Secretly Canadian in September for their joint tour.

Dolorean's third album You Can't Win was released on February 20, 2007 on Yep Roc. The album was largely well received by professional critics. Allmusic gave it a rating of 3.5/5, and reviewer Margaret Reges described the album as "the kind of terrain traversed by other introspective, rustic, youngish men like Jeff Tweedy, Joe Purdy, and (to an extent) Will Oldham." PopMatters gave it 7/10, and wrote that "Dolorean play in a relaxed lockstep befitting James' tales of emotional drift."

After the release of You Can't Win, Dolorean went on a hiatus until 2010. Al James told TheWaster.com in an interview: "we had released about three records in about five years. There was a lot of touring, a lot of time in the studio... we just needed a little break to re-calibrate and get some good energy going again."

=== Recent years (2010–present) ===
External videos
- Dolorean - "Black Hills Gold" (OFFICIAL VIDEO) (December 9, 2011)

On October 26, 2010, the band released the EP Anticipation Blues on Partisan Records, which included three new tracks that hadn't been included in their upcoming album. The EP also included the guitar lines of Jon Neufield, who had recently joined the group. Neufeld has also played with northwest bands such as Black Prairie and Jackstraw.

The Unfazed is the fourth full-length by Dolorean, released in 2011 on Partisan. It reached No. 41 on the Top Heatseekers chart. Like Dolorean's previous three albums, The Unfazed met with a largely positive press response. NPR gave it a positive review, while Allmusic gave it a score of 3.5/5. Noel Murray of The A.V. Club wrote the album "blends the dreamy psychedelia of Pink Floyd with the yearning balladry of Gene Clark."

Dolorean's 2012 single "What Could You Do?" was featured in season 9 of Grey's Anatomy. The band worked on a number of songs over the next two years, and on May 20, 2014, they released the single "Miami Wine."

The band announced their break up in 2014 and played their last show at Mississippi Studios in Portland, Oregon on May 31, 2014. During the show, Al James joked that it's time to call it quits when all the band members show up to gigs in separate cars.

== Members ==
- Al James - guitar/vocals
- Jay Clarke - organ/piano
- Ben Nugent - drums/percussion/vocals
- James Adair - bass
- Jon Neufeld - guitar

== Discography ==
=== Studio albums ===
Year	Album title	Release details	Chart peaks
Year	Album title	Release details	US Heat
2003	Not Exotic	Released: November 4, 2003; Label: Yep Roc Records; Format: CD, digital, vinyl	–
2004	Violence in the Snowy Fields	Released: October 5, 2004; Label: Yep Roc Records; Format: CD, digital, vinyl	–
2007	You Can't Win	Released: February 20, 2007; Label: Yep Roc Records; Format: CD, digital, vinyl	–
2011	The Unfazed	Released: January 18, 2011; Label: Partisan Records; Format: CD, digital, vinyl	41
"—" denotes a recording that did not chart or was not released in that territory.

=== EPs ===
Extended plays by Dolorean
Year	Album title	Release details
2001	Sudden Oak	Released: September 1, 2001 (remastered 2004); Label: Dolorean Recordings; Format: CDR, digital download
2004	Bloodknot	Released: July 4, 2004; Label: Blue Scottsdale Publishing; Format: Digital download
2010	Anticipation Blues	Released: October 26, 2010; Label: Partisan Records; Format: Digital download

=== Singles ===
Selected singles and notable songs by Dolorean
Year	Title	Album	Release details
2004	"Benito's Dust"	Split 7-inch with Holy Sons	Blue Scottsdale Publishing (September 1, 2004)
2005	"Ghost of David" (Damien Jurado cover)	Split 7-inch with Damien Jurado	Secretly Canadian (September 1, 2005) (tour release only, 600 copy limit)
2006	"The Biggest Lie"	To Elliott, from Portland	Expunged Records (February 7, 2006)
2011	"Little Brown Mushroom"	Single	Blue Scottsdale Publishing (October 1, 2011)
2012	"What Could You Do?"	Single	Blue Scottsdale Publishing (October 16, 2012); Featured in Grey's Anatomy season 9
2014	"Miami Wine"	Single	Blue Scottsdale Publishing (May 20, 2014)

=== Compilation albums ===
- 2009: Sketches For Portraits (September 1, 2009)

== See also ==
- List of rock musicians
- Music of Oregon
