= Apocalypse (Cigarettes After Sex song) =

Single by Cigarettes After Sex

from the album Cigarettes After Sex
- Released: March 21, 2017
- Genre: Slowcore
- Length: 4:50
- Label: Partisan
- Songwriter: Greg Gonzalez
- Producer: Greg Gonzalez

Cigarettes After Sex singles chronology
"K." (2016)	"Apocalypse" (2017)	"Each Time You Fall in Love" (2017)

"Apocalypse" is a song by American band Cigarettes After Sex, released as the second single from their debut album Cigarettes After Sex on March 21, 2017. It was written and produced by vocalist Greg Gonzalez. It did not chart internationally until 2022, following its use in TikTok trends. The song, as of March 6, 2026, has amassed over 2.3 billion streams on Spotify.

== Background and composition ==
"Apocalypse" is a slowcore song. Gonzalez was inspired to write the song after he and two women he had dated had "big ambitions" but were "stuck" in their hometown, which felt "impossible" to get out of. Gonzalez then moved to New York City, but the two women remained in their hometown. He said the song is ultimately "about being there for people, when you're all alone. It was like a little affectionate statement to them."

== Release ==
"Apocalypse" was released on March 21, 2017, as part of the band's 2017 self-titled debut album. The song went viral in 2022, following its use on a TikTok trend where a childhood photograph is used to remind one to be kinder to themselves.

== Charts ==
=== Weekly charts ===
Chart performance for "Apocalypse"
Chart (2017–2025)	Peak position
Austria (Ö3 Austria Top 40)	61
Belgium (Ultratip Bubbling Under Flanders)	35
Canada Hot 100 (Billboard)	83
Global 200 (Billboard)	129
Greece International (IFPI Greece)	31
Lithuania (AGATA)	27
Netherlands (Single Tip)	12
Norway (IFPI Norge)	85
Portugal (AFP)	185
Sweden Heatseeker (Sverigetopplistan)	10
Switzerland (Schweizer Hitparade)	39
UK Indie (Official Charts)	25
US Bubbling Under Hot 100 (Billboard)	16
US Hot Rock & Alternative Songs (Billboard)	18

=== Year-end charts ===
Year-end chart performance for "Apocalypse"
Chart (2023)	Position
US Hot Rock & Alternative Songs (Billboard)	42

== Certifications ==
Certifications for "Apocalypse"
Region	Certification	Certified units/sales
Denmark (IFPI Danmark)	Platinum	90,000^{‡}
France (SNEP)	Diamond	333,333^{‡}
Italy (FIMI)	Platinum	100,000^{‡}
New Zealand (RMNZ)	2× Platinum	60,000^{‡}
Portugal (AFP)	Platinum	10,000^{‡}
Spain (Promusicae)	Platinum	60,000^{‡}
United Kingdom (BPI)	Platinum	600,000^{‡}
United States (RIAA)	2× Platinum	2,000,000^{‡}
Streaming
Greece (IFPI Greece)	3× Platinum	6,000,000^{†}
^{‡} Sales+streaming figures based on certification alone.^{†} Streaming-only figures based on certification alone.
