= Burning Off Impurities =

Studio album by Grails
- Released: 24 April 2007
- Genres: Experimental rock; post-rock; psychedelic rock
- Length: 50:18
- Label: Temporary Residence Limited

Grails chronology
Redlight (2004)	Burning Off Impurities (2007)	Take Refuge in Clean Living (2008)

Professional ratings
Review scores
Source	Rating
Allmusic	4/5 stars
Pitchfork	7.7/10
Sputnikmusic	2.5/5 stars
Tiny Mix Tapes	3.5/5 stars
Exclaim!	mildly favorable
Adequacy	favorable
The Wire	favorable

Burning Off Impurities is the third studio album by American experimental rock band Grails, released on Temporary Residence Limited in 2007.

== Track listing ==
All songs written by Grails.

No.	Title	Length
1.	"Soft Temple"	6:41
2.	"More Extinction"	2:15
3.	"Silk Rd"	8:15
4.	"Drawn Curtains"	4:56
5.	"Outer Banks"	7:48
6.	"Dead Vine Blues"	4:41
7.	"Origin-ing"	7:52
8.	"Burning Off Impurities"	7:50
Total length:		50:18

== Personnel ==
=== Grails and featured guest musicians ===
Sources:

- Emil Amos – drums, tapes, keyboards, guitar, melodica
- Alex Hall – electric guitar, sampler
- Zak Riles – twelve-string acoustic guitar, six-string acoustic guitar, banjo, oud, electric guitar, pedal steel guitar
- William Slater – bass guitar, piano, organ, electric piano, harpsichord, guitar
- Dylan Rice-Leary – harmonica
- Cory Gray – trumpet, baritone horn
- Kate O'Brien – violin

=== Technical personnel ===
Sources:

- Jeff Stuart Saltzman – mixing engineer
- Carl Saff – mastering engineer
- Emil Amos – recording, mixing
- Alex Hall – recording, mixing
- Zak Riles – recording
- Steven Wray Lobdell – recording engineer (''Dead Vine Blues'')
