= Ash Black Bufflo =

- Origin: Portland, Oregon, U.S.
- Genres: Experimental music
- Years active: 2000-present
- Label: Knitting Factory
- Member of: The Standard
- Website: knittingfactoryrecords.com/artists/ash-black-bufflo

Ash Black Bufflo, sometimes spelled Buffalo, is the professional name of Portland-based music composer and experimental musician Jay Clarke. He composes music for feature-length films, short films, documentaries, and dance and theater projects.

== Career ==
He is notable for scoring the music for the documentary Marwencol which won the Jury Prize at the South by Southwest film festival and received positive critical attention. He created soundscapes for theatrical productions such as My Mind Is Like an Open Meadow, which received positive reviews in Willamette Week.

He performs and records with numerous Portland-area bands including Dolorean, Holy Sons, Grails, and others. Clarke landed a record deal with Knitting Factory Records, and there are plans to release his debut CD entitled Andasol using the name Ash Black Bufflo in 2011.

== Reception ==
A review in MVRemix Urban described the album Andasol as being:

... all beds and sound landscapes, surprisingly intricate, handcrafted symphonies slashed through with left-field shockers of distorted found sounds, chilling spoken word and synthed-out trips.

— Caile Michelle, MVRemix Urban

Clarke explained his use of tone clusters in a theatrical production as a way to heighten dramatic suspense:

A tone cluster is any tight cluster of notes played at the exact same time ... Sometimes you use your forearm, sometimes you use sticks, anything to get as many notes down as possible.

— Jay Clarke, quoted in the Portland Tribune

== Discography ==
- Andasol, Knitting Factory Records, released May 2011
