= Redlight (Grails album) =

Studio album by Grails
- Released: 20 September 2004
- Studio: Type Foundry
- Genre: Alternative rock, experimental rock, post-rock
- Length: 41:56
- Label: Neurot Recordings

Grails chronology
The Burden of Hope (2003)	Redlight (2004)	Burning Off Impurities (2007)

Redlight is the second studio album by American experimental rock band Grails, released on Neurot Recordings in 2004 as a follow-up to The Burden of Hope

== Track listing ==
All songs written by Grails, except Track 1, which is a Traditional song.

No.	Title	Length
1.	"Dargai"	4:53
2.	"The Volunteer"	5:56
3.	"Worksong"	2:35
4.	"High & Low"	4:04
5.	"Reprieve"	3:11
6.	"Redlight"	4:25
7.	"New Lystra"	2:40
8.	"Fever"	6:59
9.	"Alms"	2:54
10.	"Word Made Flesh"	4:18
Total length:		38:22

== Personnel ==
Grails

- Emil Amos – Drums, steel guitar
- Alex Hall – Guitar
- Zak Riles – Guitar, keyboards, dulcimer, lap steel guitar
- William Slater – Piano, bass, electric piano, guitar
- Timothy Horner – Violin
