= Take Refuge in Clean Living =

Studio album by Grails
- Released: 13 May 2008
- Genre: Experimental rock; post-rock; psychedelic rock; world music
- Length: 32:31
- Label: Important Records

Grails chronology
Burning Off Impurities (2007)	Take Refuge in Clean Living (2008)	Doomsdayer's Holiday (2008)

Professional ratings
Review scores
Source	Rating
AllMusic	4/5 stars
Pitchfork	7.8/10
Tiny Mix Tapes	3.5/5 stars
Exclaim!	favorable

Take Refuge in Clean Living is the fourth studio album by American experimental rock band Grails, released on Important Records in 2008.

== Track listing ==
All songs written by Grails, except Track 3, which is written by The Ventures.

No.	Title	Length
1.	"Stoned at the Taj Again"	7:35
2.	"PTSD"	6:51
3.	"11th Hour"	4:08
4.	"Take Refuge"	8:06
5.	"Clean Living"	5:51
Total length:		32:31

== Personnel ==
Grails

- Emil Amos – synthesizer, piano, guitars, Marxophone, tapes, vibes, vocal, mixing
- Alex John Hall – guitars, sampler, mixing, design/layout
- William Slater – bass, organ, harpsichord, vocal, harmonium, guitar
- Wm. Zak Riles – guitars, saz, pedal steel guitar, feedback washes
- Ben Nugent – drums

Additional musicians

- Kate O'Brien-Clarke – strings
- Cory Gray – horns

Technical

- Steve Lobdell – recording engineer (1, 2, 4)
- Jake Hall – recording engineer (1, 2, 4)
- Jeff Stuart Saltzman – post-production (1, 4)
- Carl Saff – mastering
