= I Get into Trouble =

I Get Into Trouble

Studio album by Maple Glider
- Released: 13 October 2023
- Length: 35:55
- Label: Partisan

Maple Glider chronology
To Enjoy Is the Only Thing (2021)	I Get Into Trouble (2023)

I Get Into Trouble is the second studio album by Australian musician Maple Glider. It was released on 13 October 2023 by Partisan Records.

== Background ==
On 11 July 2023, Maple Glider announced the release of her second studio album, alongside the first single Dinah.

== Critical reception ==
Professional ratings
Aggregate scores
Source	Rating
Metacritic	76/100
Review scores
Source	Rating
The Line of Best Fit	9/10
The Skinny	4/5 stars

I Get Into Trouble was met with "generally favourable" reviews from critics. At Metacritic, which assigns a weighted average rating out of 100 to reviews from mainstream publications, this release received an average score of 76, based on four reviews.

Tara Hepburn of The Skinny gave the release a four out of five stars, noting "Where her debut album To Enjoy Is the Only Thing was a hypnotic slice of psychedelic folk, I Get Into Trouble's lead single Dinah sees Zeitsch lean harder on her pop sensibilities.

== Track listing ==
I Get Into Trouble
No.	Title	Length
1.	"Do You"	4:09
2.	"Dinah"	2:49
3.	"Two Years"	3:29
4.	"FOMO"	3:30
5.	"Don't Kiss Me"	4:04
6.	"You at the Top of the Driveway"	2:21
7.	"You're Gonne Be a Daddy"	3:40
8.	"For You and All the Songs We Loved"	2:34
9.	"Surprises"	4:04
10.	"Scream"	5:14
