= Doomsdayer's Holiday =

Studio album by Grails
- Released: October 7, 2008
- Recorded: April 2007 – August 2008
- Genre: Post-rock
- Length: 38:28
- Label: Temporary Residence Limited

Grails chronology
Take Refuge in Clean Living (2008)	Doomsdayer's Holiday (2008)	Deep Politics (2011)

Professional ratings
Aggregate scores
Source	Rating
Metacritic	82/100
Review scores
Source	Rating
AllMusic	4/5 stars
Alternative Press	4/5 stars
Mojo	4/5 stars
Pitchfork	7.6/10
The Skinny	3/5 stars
Sputnikmusic	3.5/5
Under the Radar	6/10

Doomsdayer's Holiday is Grails' fifth album, released in 2008 through Temporary Residence.

== Track listing ==
All songs written by Grails.

No.	Title	Length
1.	"Doomsdayer's Holiday"	3:32
2.	"Reincarnation Blues"	4:33
3.	"The Natural Man"	4:49
4.	"Immediate Mate"	5:50
5.	"Predestination Blues"	6:28
6.	"X-Contaminations"	5:04
7.	"Acid Rain"	8:08
Total length:		38:28

== Personnel ==
Grails

- Emil Amos – drums, guitar, keyboards, lap steel guitar, vocals, melodica, tapes, editing and additional recording, mixing on "Immediate Mate"
- Alex Hall – guitars, sampling, editing and additional recording, art direction
- William Slater – bass guitar, piano,synthesizer, vocals, guzheng
- Wm. Zak Riles – acoustic guitar, electric guitar, saz, oud

Additional musicians

- Alan Bishop – vocals on "Predestination Blues"
- Randall Dunn – analog synthesizers
- Kate O'Brien-Clarke – violin
- Jordan Hudson – vibes
- Erik Nugent – flute

Production

- Jake Hall – recording engineer
- Steve Lobdell – recording engineer
- Randall Dunn – recording engineer for "Acid Rain"
- Jeff Stuart Saltzman – mixing (except "Immediate Mate")
- Carl Saff – mastering
