= Violence in the Snowy Fields =

Studio album by Dolorean
- Released: October 5, 2004
- Genre: Alt-country
- Label: Yep Roc
- Producer: Jeff Saltzman, Dolorean

Dolorean chronology
| Not Exotic (2003) | Violence in the Snowy Fields (2004) | You Can't Win (2007) |

Violence in the Snowy Fields is the second full-length by Dolorean, released in 2004 on Yep Roc Records. The album is slightly more up-tempo than their debut Not Exotic. Reviews have made comparisons to the Band and Wild Honey-era Beach Boys. It received a favorable review from The A.V. Club, and a mixed review from PopMatters.

== History ==
=== Production and release ===
Violence in the Snowy Fields was recorded throughout 2003 and 2004, with the four members of Dolorean providing most of the arrangement and instruments. Guest artist Emil Amos also provided additional piano and guitar, while the album's producer, Jeff Saltzman, also provided guitar. Bruce Kaphan also contributed additional pedal steel guitar.

Before the release of Violence in the Snowy Fields, on July 8, 2004 Dolorean released Bloodknot, an EP which contained four songs that were "voice and nylon string guitar versions" of tracks that would appear in Violence in the Snowy Fields. Violence in the Snowy Fields was released on October 5, 2004 on Yep Roc Records.

=== Reception ===
Professional ratings
Review scores
| Source | Rating |
|---|---|
| AllMusic | 3.5/5 stars |
| The A.V. Club | (favorable) |
| PopMatters | (mixed) |
| Static Multimedia | 3/4 stars |

The album received a favorable review from The A.V. Club, who wrote that the band's "first proper album, Not Exotic, floated through a melancholy alt-country haze, occasionally landing in places of crystalline beauty. The follow-up, Violence In The Snowy Fields, sounds more focused and song-oriented, but with no loss of the sorrowful atmosphere that was the band's initial selling point." The album also received a mixed review from PopMatters. Allmusic gave the album a positive review and a score of 3.5/5.

Stephen Thompson of The A.V. Club named it No. 4 on his list of the best albums of 2004, writing that though the lyrics are "bleak," the album "oozes comfort, with songs gently blanketed in woozy strings, pedal steel, and vocal harmonies that sound almost comically gorgeous." The track "To Destruction" was also named one of the best songs of the year by the publication. The album was also named No. 8 on a list of the best 2004 albums by Gentrey Boeckel of Stylus Magazine, and it also ranked on a list of the top forty by Ted Burns for the same publication.

== Track listing ==
All songs written by Al James.

| No. | Title | Length |
|---|---|---|
| 1. | "The Search" | 3:56 |
| 2. | "Put You To Sleep" | 3:49 |
| 3. | "Dying in Time" | 3:44 |
| 4. | "Holding On" | 5:55 |
| 5. | "To Destruction" | 3:21 |
| 6. | "Violence in the Snowy Fields" | 3:21 |
| 7. | "My Grey Life (Second Chances)" | 3:20 |
| 8. | "The Righteous Shall Destroy the Precious" | 5:58 |
| 9. | "In the Fall" | 3:38 |

== Personnel ==
Dolorean

- Al James - vocals, guitar
- Jay Clarke - piano, organ, vibraphone, string arrangement
- James Adair - bass, backing vocals
- Ben Nugent - drums, percussion, backing vocals

Additional personnel

- Emil Amos - additional piano and guitar
- Jeff Saltzman - production, additional guitar, synthesizer, autoharp
- Bruce Kaphan - pedal steel, additional guitar
