= Anches En Maat =

Studio album by Grails
- Released: September 22, 2023
- Length: 40:00
- Label: Temporary Residence

Grails chronology
Chalice Hymnal (2017)	Anches En Maat (2023)

Singles from Anches En Maat
- 1. "Sad & Illegal" Released: July 10, 2023; 2. "Black Rain" Released: August 23, 2023

Anches En Maat is the eighth studio album by American band Grails. It was released on September 22, 2023, by Temporary Residence.

== Background ==
On July 10, 2023, Grails announced the release of their eighth studio album, along with the first single "Sad & Illegal".

The second single "Black Rain" was released on August 23, 2023.

== Critical reception ==
Professional ratings
Aggregate scores
Source	Rating
Metacritic	78/100
Review scores
Source	Rating
AllMusic	3.5/5 stars
PopMatters	7/10

Anches En Maat was met with "generally favorable" reviews from critics. At Metacritic, which assigns a weighted average rating out of 100 to reviews from mainstream publications, this release received an average score of 78, based on 4 reviews.

=== Accolades ===
Publications' year-end list appearances for Anches En Maat
Critic/Publication	List	Rank	Ref
PopMatters	PopMatters' Top 20 Experimental Albums	18	
PopMatters	PopMatters' Best Metal Albums of September 2023	—N/a	

== Track listing ==
Anches En Maat track listing
No.	Title	Length
1.	"Sad & Illegal"	5:04
2.	"Viktor's Night Map"	5:03
3.	"Sisters of Bilitis"	5:32
4.	"Pool of Gems"	3:09
5.	"Evening Song"	3:47
6.	"Black Rain"	4:48
7.	"Anches En Maat"	12:37
Total length:		40:00

== Personnel ==
Grails

- Emil Amos – piano, drums, Mellotron, OP-1, tapes, electric guitars, autoharp, mixing
- Alex Hall – electric guitars, synthesizer, design, layout
- Jesse Bates – pedal steel guitar, bass, flute; 12-string guitar (3); drums (5)
- Ilyas Ahmed – electric guitar, acoustic guitar, guitar synthesizer
- A.E. Paterra – synthesizers, Moog Taurus

Additional musicians

- Timba Harris – string arrangement and performance (1–3)
- Cory Gray – horns
- Kh Marie – voice (2, 5)
- Casey Proctor – Mellotron and Moog synthesizer (4, 7)
- Dylan Rice-Leary – harmonica (4)
- Andy Burton – Continuum (7)

Production

- Aaron Hill – recording engineer
- Bill Simpkins – mixing (1, 3)
- Heba Kadry – mastering
- Julien Langendorff – front artwork
