= The Burden of Hope =

Studio album by Grails
- Released: October 7, 2003
- Studio: Type Foundry
- Genre: Alternative rock, Experimental rock, Post-rock
- Length: 38:22
- Label: Neurot Recordings

Grails chronology
The Burden of Hope (2003)	Redlight (2004)

The Burden of Hope is the debut studio album by American experimental rock band Grails, released on Neurot Recordings in 2003.

== Track listing ==
All songs written by Grails, except Track 6, written by Alan Bishop, Charles Gocher and Rick Bishop.

No.	Title	Length
1.	"The Burden of Hope"	3:54
2.	"Lord I Hate Your Day"	1:49
3.	"The Deed"	5:32
4.	"In the Beginning"	3:25
5.	"Invocation"	2:06
6.	"Space Prophet Dogon"	4:07
7.	"The March"	2:25
8.	"Broken Ballad"	3:47
9.	"White Flag"	6:13
10.	"Canyon Hymn"	5:03
Total length:		38:22

== Personnel ==
Grails

- Emil Amos – Drums, Steel Guitar
- Alex Hall – Guitar
- Zak Riles – Bass
- William Slater – Piano, Bass, Electric piano, Guitar
- Timothy Horner – Violin
