= TTSSFU =

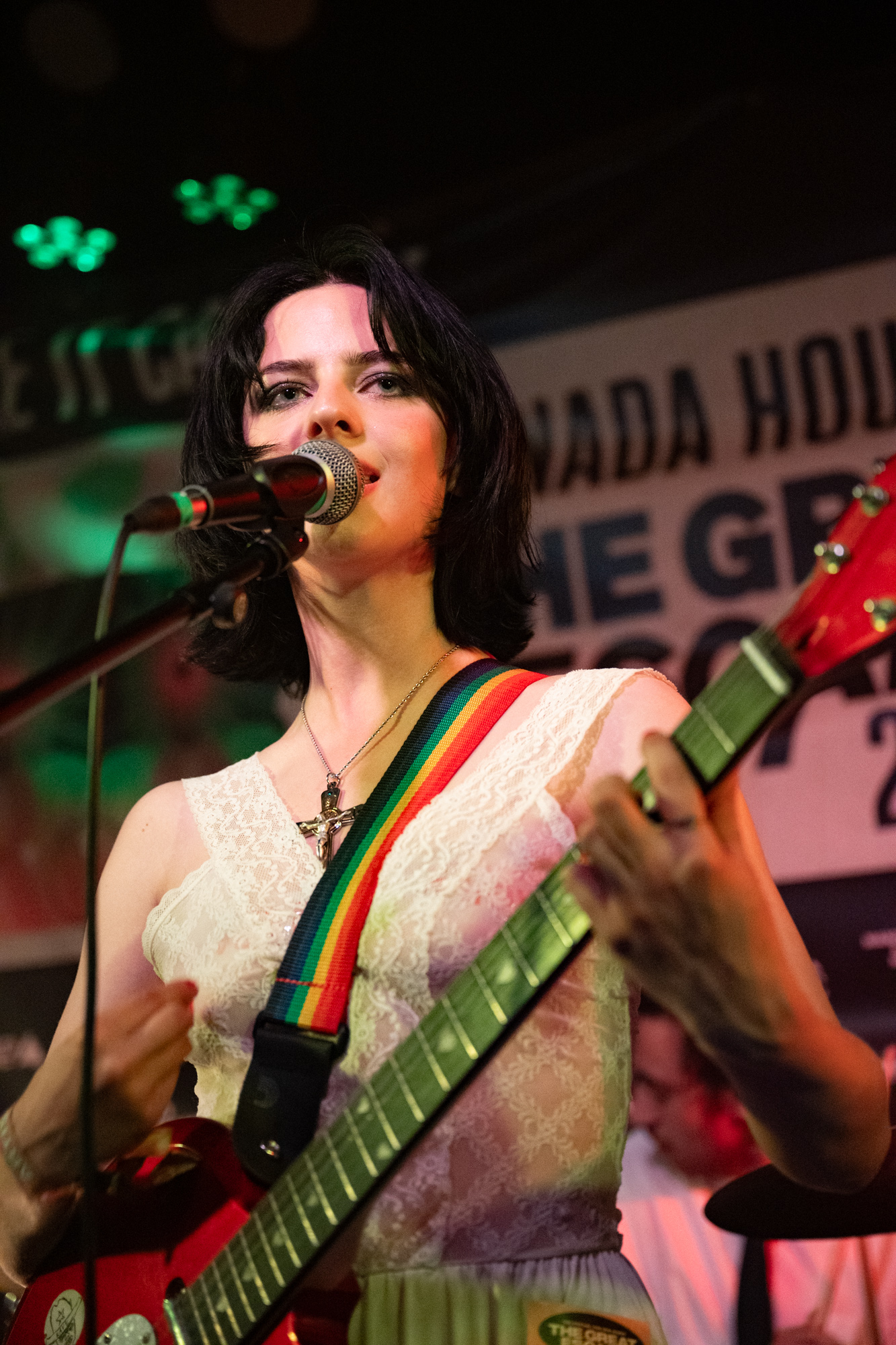
- Stephens in 2025

Background information
- Born: Tasmin Nicole Stephens; 2003 (age 22–23)
- Origin: Wigan, Greater Manchester, England
- Genres: Shoegaze; dream pop; slacker rock
- Instruments: Vocals; guitar
- Years active: 2020–present
- Labels: Partisan Records; Fear of Missing Out Records
- Formerly of: Duvet
- Website: ttssfu.com

Tasmin Nicole Stephens (born 2003), also known as TTSSFU, is an English singer-songwriter and guitarist based in Manchester. She (Note: Stephens uses she/her and they/them pronouns.) played guitar in the post punk band Duvet and has since gained prominence as a solo artist in the shoegaze and dream pop genres. Stephens is signed with Partisan Records.

== Early life ==
Stephens grew up in Wigan, Greater Manchester.

== Career ==
The post punk band Duvet formed in 2022, with Stephens serving as guitarist.

Under the TTSSFU moniker, Stephens released lead single "I Hope You Die" in December 2023 and the mini-album Me, Jed and Andy in February 2024 via Fear of Missing Out Records. The mini-album takes its title and inspiration from the relationship between Andy Warhol and Jed Johnson. That summer, Stephens supported Mannequin Pussy on tour. In October 2024, Stephens signed with Partisan Records. The single "Studio 54" was the debut release under Partisan.

In August 2025, Stephens released her second mini-album as TTSSFU titled Blown. In November 2025, Stephens released the single "Upstairs".

== Artistry ==
The first band Stephens was "obsessed" with as a child was the Beatles. Through her older sister, Stephens was introduced to Nirvana and the Cure. Kurt Cobain of the former was "an entry to grunge" for Stephens. Her other formative influences include Slowdive, Cigarettes After Sex and Soko. Me, Jed and Andy drew upon Soko, Alex G and Coma Cinema, while Blown drew upon the Cure, Wolf Alice and Sky Ferreira.

== Discography ==
=== Mini-albums ===
- Me, Jed and Andy (2024)
- Blown (2025)

=== EPs ===
- The Body (2022)

=== Singles ===
- "Has to End (Fast Version)" (2021)
- "Help" (2021)
- "Meat" (2022)
- "Wideawake (demo)" (2022)
- "Pocket" (2022)
- "California" (2022)
- "Palms" (2022)
- "At All" (2022)
- "Remember" (2022)
- "Growing Older" (2023)
- "Jed" (2023)
- "I Hope You Die" (2023)
- "Baggage" (2024)
- "Studio 54" (2024)
- "Upstairs" (2025)
- "Call U Back" (2025)
