= You Can't Win (album) =

Studio album by Dolorean
- Released: February 20, 2007
- Genre: Indie rock
- Label: Yep Roc

Dolorean chronology
Violence in the Snowy Fields (2004)	You Can't Win (2007)	The Unfazed (2011)

You Can't Win is the third full-length by Dolorean, released in 2007 on Yep Roc Records. The album was largely well received by professional critics, and met with positive reviews in Q and Uncut.

== History ==
=== Production ===
On a post on Yep Roc's Website, frontman Al James wrote "Neil Young used to book studio time and shows for himself and Crazy Horse without rehearsing new songs with the band." James booked several shows and several subsequent dates in a recording studio as a result. "The performances were raw, passionate, and loose - everything that we hadn't been able to capture on previous recordings." Beyond Dolorean, Emil Amos of Holy Sons also contributed guitar.

=== Release and reception ===
Professional ratings
Review scores
Source	Rating
AllMusic	3.5/5 stars
No Depression	(positive)
PopMatters	7/10 stars
Q	3/5 stars
Uncut	3/5 stars

You Can't Win was released on February 20, 2007 on Yep Roc. That year it would come out as a digital download, a CD, and a vinyl LP. The album was largely well received by professional critics, and met with positive reviews in Q and UnCut.

AllMusic gave it a rating of 3.5/5, and reviewer Margaret Reges described the album as "the kind of terrain traversed by other introspective, rustic, youngish men like Jeff Tweedy, Joe Purdy, and (to an extent) Will Oldham -- the kind of place you go if you're looking for empty stretches of pavement and hulking, rusted-out factories moldering in the tall grass. Dolorean's lead singer and songwriter, Al James, is interested in stories about men on the outskirts; You Can't Win, to put it in the words of writer James Salter, concerns itself with 'a breed of aimless wanderers' who 'have an infuriating power, that of condemned men. They can talk to anybody; they can speak the truth.'" PopMatters gave it 7/10, and wrote that "Dolorean play in a relaxed lockstep befitting James’ tales of emotional drift." No Depression gave it a glowing review.

== Track listing ==
All songs written by Al James. All songs arranged and performed by Dolorean.

No.	Title	Length
1.	"You Can't Win"	4:26
2.	"We Winter Wrens"	3:21
3.	"Heather Remind Me How This Ends"	2:45
4.	"Beachcomber Blues"	6:33
5.	"You Don't Want to Know"	1:42
6.	"Buffalo Gal"	5:06
7.	"In Love With the Doubt"	3:06
8.	"What One Bottle Can Do"	4:23
9.	"33-53.9° N/118-38.8° W" (vocal arrangement/lead vocal melody by Ben Nugent)	2:47
10.	"Just Don't Leave Town"	3:57
11.	"My Still Life"	2:49

== Personnel ==
Dolorean

- Al James - vocals, acoustic guitar
- James Adair - bass guitar
- Jay Clarke - piano, organ
- Ben Nugent - drums, percussion, vocals

Additional personnel

- Emil Amos - electric guitar, vocals
