= The Mountain Moves =

Studio album by Treetop Flyers
- Released: 25 June 2013
- Genre: Alternative folk
- Length: 47:10
- Label: Partisan
- Producer: Noah Georgeson

Singles from The Mountain Moves
- 1. "Things Will Change" Released: 23 April 2013

Professional ratings
Aggregate scores
Source	Rating
Metacritic	76/100
Review scores
Source	Rating
Allmusic	3.5/5 stars
The Independent	4/5 stars
MusicOMH	4/5 stars

The Mountain Moves is the debut album from English folk rock band Treetop Flyers. It was released in June 2013 under Partisan Records.

== Track list ==
All tracks are written by Treetop Flyers

No.	Title	Length
1.	"Things Will Change"	4:03
2.	"Houses Are Burning"	3:40
3.	"Waiting on You"	4:02
4.	"Rose Is In The Yard"	4:32
5.	"She's Gotta Run"	2:57
6.	"Haunted House"	6:52
7.	"Postcards"	3:49
8.	"Making Time"	3:56
9.	"Picture Show"	3:10
10.	"Storm Will Pass"	6:05
11.	"Is It All Worth It"	4:04
