= Reflect (album) =

Studio album by Curtis Fowlkes and Catfish Corner
- Released: 1999
- Studio: New York City
- Genre: Jazz
- Label: Knitting Factory; KFR - 246
- Producer: Curtis Fowlkes, Ted Cruz

Reflect is an album by trombonist Curtis Fowlkes and his band Catfish Corner. Fowlkes's only release as a leader, it was issued in 1999 by Knitting Factory Records. The album also features saxophonist Sam Furnace, trumpeter Russ Johnson, guitarist Duncan Cleary, keyboardist Ted Cruz, double bassist Carlos Henderson, drummer J. T. Lewis, and, on one track, vocalist Sheila Prevost.

== Reception ==
Professional ratings
Review scores
Source	Rating
All About Jazz	3.5/5 stars
AllMusic	4/5 stars

In a review for AllMusic, Michael G. Nastos stated that the band's "collective sounds cross many improvisational demarcations, but is rooted in the post-bop originality of the '50s," and wrote: "Much very good bordering on great jazz to be heard here, and we suspect just a scraping of the surface for what Fowlkes and his friends have in store in the not too distant future. Recommended with no reservation."

Glenn Astarita of All About Jazz commented: "Fowlkes sparkles as a bandleader, composer and soloist along with his equally adept and zealous supporting cast... the music is cool, sleek, boisterous and happening! The band is tight and the compositions are strong – which adds up to a very pleasant and enjoyable listening experience and a nice contrast to all of the complexities found in every day life."

Writing for JazzTimes, Harvey Pekar remarked: "Reflect is sort of an advanced post-bop CD with a fusion element... Fowlkes' playing is forceful, even volatile, like a modern J. C. Higginbotham, using wide interval leaps and excitingly employing the upper register, but he also exhibits a big, lush tone... Now that Fowlkes has gotten started, hopefully he'll be cutting albums more frequently. As impressive a disc as Reflect is, it only begins to demonstrate his abilities."

Coda's Steve Vickery wrote: "Fowlkes delivers an ensemble sound that soothes rather than punches the listener with harmony to spare. Fowlkes parlays his rich tone into a winning sound here... soloists never outstay their welcome, a lesson that others could reflect on."

== Track listing ==
1. "Treasure Chest" (Curtis Fowlkes) – 6:32
2. "What Was...Is" (Curtis Fowlkes) – 6:13
3. "Blue Teardrops Falling" (Curtis Fowlkes) – 10:40
4. "Ashe" (Curtis Fowlkes) – 6:28
5. "Sacred Monsters" (Curtis Fowlkes) – 7:33
6. "Walker Snead" (Curtis Fowlkes) – 6:00
7. "The Coaster" (Grachan Moncur III) – 6:31
8. "When I Fall in Love" (Victor Young, Edward Heyman) – 5:26
9. "Reflect" (Curtis Fowlkes, Sheila Prevost) – 3:06

== Personnel ==
- Curtis Fowlkes – trombone
- Sam Furnace – alto saxophone
- Russ Johnson – trumpet
- Duncan Cleary – guitar (tracks 6 and 9)
- Ted Cruz – electric piano, organ, synthesizer
- Carlos Henderson – double bass
- J. T. Lewis – drums
- Sheila Prevost – vocals (track 9)
