= Chalice Hymnal =

Chalice Hymnal may refer to:

- An English-language hymnal of the Christian Church (Disciples of Christ)
- Chalice Hymnal (album), by Grails, 2017
