= Cry (Cigarettes After Sex album) =

Studio album by Cigarettes After Sex
- Released: October 25, 2019
- Recorded: July 2016 – June 2017
- Genres: Ambient pop; dream pop; slowcore
- Length: 40:26
- Label: Partisan
- Producer: Greg Gonzalez

Cigarettes After Sex chronology
Cigarettes After Sex (2017)	Cry (2019)	X's (2024)

Singles from Cry
- 1. "Heavenly" Released: August 28, 2019; 2. "Falling in Love" Released: 2019

Cry is the second studio album by American ambient pop band Cigarettes After Sex, released through Partisan Records on October 25, 2019. It was preceded by the single "Heavenly".

== Background ==
Frontman Greg Gonzalez said: "We made [Cry] to just be a snapshot of a moment, to capture the feeling of something. And it's flawed, but the fact that it's flawed means that it's an honest portrayal. And that's what is perfect about it to me." Gonzalez also remarked that he views the album as a "film" as it was "shot in this stunning, exotic location Mallorca, and it stitches all these different characters and scenes together, but in the end is really about romance, beauty & sexuality."

Elaborating on the band's style, Gonzalez said that after experiencing heartbreak, the music he needed was "very gentle" and "very peaceful, because internally I was going through such turmoil. The music that I make became a reaction to the life that happened."

Gonzalez wrote "Falling in Love" over two years. He states, "I wrote the chorus in the middle of a bunch of tours, very far from love or real relationships, and trying to write that song would've felt dishonest. By the time we got into the studio, I was seeing my current girlfriend and wrote from a real perspective. It felt very strange, in a way, to finally have that."

== Critical reception ==
Professional ratings
Aggregate scores
Source	Rating
Metacritic	69/100
Review scores
Source	Rating
AllMusic	3/5 stars
Clash	8/10
Exclaim!	9/10
The Guardian	4/5 stars
The Independent	4/5 stars
NME	3/5 stars
Pitchfork	4.0/10

According to the review aggregator Metacritic, Cry received "generally favorable reviews" based on a weighted average score of 69 out of 100 from 14 critic scores. Alisha Mughal of Exclaim! called the album a "gentler and more vulnerable" than the band's debut album, and writing that the album "will make you cry, because Gonzalez knows what he's doing. It's cathartic, stunning, it'll awaken your senses and it's not to be missed." On the other hand Timothy Monger of AllMusic stated that "for a project based on amorous and sensual pleasures, Cigarettes After Sex feels a little too one-dimensional".

=== Year-end rankings ===
Publication	Accolade	Rank	Ref.
Afisha Daily (Russia)	The Best Foreign Albums of 2019	13	

== Track listing ==
All tracks are written by Greg Gonzalez.

No.	Title	Length
1.	"Don't Let Me Go"	4:22
2.	"Kiss It Off Me"	4:29
3.	"Heavenly"	4:48
4.	"You're the Only Good Thing in My Life"	4:35
5.	"Touch"	4:52
6.	"Hentai"	4:45
7.	"Cry"	4:16
8.	"Falling in Love"	4:05
9.	"Pure"	4:14
Total length:		40:26

== Personnel ==
Cigarettes After Sex

- Greg Gonzalez – vocals, guitar
- Randall Miller – bass
- Jacob Tomsky – drums
- Phillip Tubbs – keyboards

Production

- Greg Gonzalez – production
- Craig Silvey – mixing
- Max Prior – additional engineering
- Greg Calbi – mastering

Artwork

- Randall Miller – graphic design
- Donovan Brien – additional packaging design
- Alessandro Puccinelli – cover photo (Mare 345 – Seascape)

== Charts ==
=== Weekly charts ===
Weekly chart performance for Cry
Chart (2019)	Peak position
Australian Albums (ARIA)	61
Austrian Albums (Ö3 Austria)	26
Belgian Albums (Ultratop Flanders)	8
Belgian Albums (Ultratop Wallonia)	19
Czech Albums (ČNS IFPI)	95
Danish Albums (Hitlisten)	31
Dutch Albums (Album Top 100)	37
French Albums (SNEP)	27
German Albums (Offizielle Top 100)	29
Italian Albums (FIMI)	60
Latvian Albums (LAIPA)	19
Lithuanian Albums (AGATA)	10
Polish Albums (ZPAV)	21
Portuguese Albums (AFP)	1
Scottish Albums (Official Charts)	21
Spanish Albums (Promusicae)	26
Swiss Albums (Schweizer Hitparade)	18
UK Albums (Official Charts)	36
US Billboard 200	152
US Independent Albums (Billboard)	10
US Top Rock & Alternative Albums (Billboard)	27

=== Year-end charts ===
Year-end chart performance for Cry
Chart (2022)	Position
Lithuanian Albums (AGATA)	58

== Certifications ==
Certifications for Cry
Region	Certification	Certified units/sales
Denmark (IFPI Danmark)	Gold	10,000^{‡}
France (SNEP)	Platinum	100,000^{‡}
New Zealand (RMNZ)	Gold	7,500^{‡}
Poland (ZPAV)	Gold	10,000^{‡}
United Kingdom (BPI)	Gold	100,000^{‡}
United States (RIAA)	Gold	500,000^{‡}
^{‡} Sales+streaming figures based on certification alone.
