= Treetop Flyers =

English folk rock band

- Origin: London, England
- Genres: Folk, alt-country, americana, country, folk rock, blues
- Years active: 2009 – present
- Labels: Loose, Partisan Records (USA)
- Members: Reid Morrison; Sam Beer; Laurie Sherman
- Website: Official Website

Treetop Flyers are an English folk rock band based in London, England. They won the Glastonbury Festival Emerging Talent Competition 2011. and released their debut album The Mountain Moves on Loose on 29 April 2013 and on Partisan Records in the US on 25 June 2013.

== Discography ==
=== Albums ===
- The Mountain Moves (2013)
- Palomino (2016)
- Treetop Flyers (2018)
- Old Habits (2021)

=== Singles ===
- "To Bury The Past" (2009)
- "It's About Time" (2011)
- "Castlewood Road" (2021)
