= Maple Glider =

Australian pop musician (born 1994)

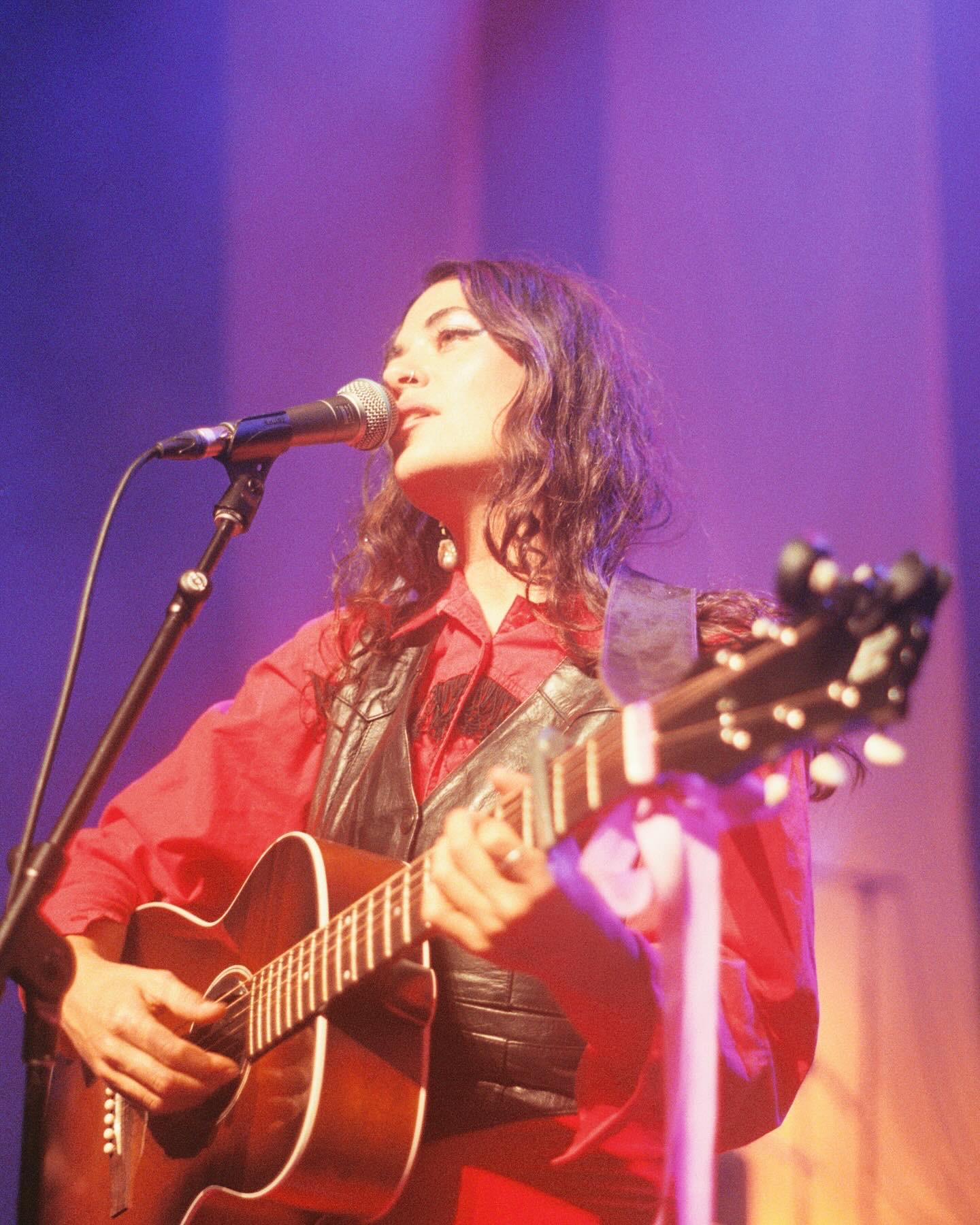
- Maple Glider performing in NSW 2024

Background information
- Born: Tori Zietsch; May 21, 1994 (age 32); Australia
- Origin: Melbourne, Australia
- Genres: Pop
- Occupations: Singer; songwriter; musician
- Instruments: Vocals; guitar
- Years active: 2017–present
- Labels: Pieater, Partisan
- Website: mapleglider.com

Tori Zietsch known professionally as Maple Glider, is an Australian pop singer-songwriter from Melbourne, Australia. Maple Glider released her debut album in June 2021.

== Early life ==
In 2020, Zietsch said "I was raised from birth in quite a restrictive religious household" in Lismore, New South Wales. She moved to Melbourne to be "ensconced in the music community".

== Career ==
=== 2017: Seavera ===
Zietsch partnered up with childhood friend, producer Daniel Pinkerton and formed Seavera, pairing acoustic guitars with dramatic electronics. In late 2017 Seavera won the very first Pie School initiative and worked with the team from Pieater to record a song that never released. Seavera parted ways soon after. Zietsch relocated to Brighton, England and began work on solo material.

=== 2018–2022: To Enjoy Is the Only Thing ===
Zietsch returned to Melbourne in late 2019 with numerous demos written while she was living in Brighton. She enlisted Tom Iansek to record, mix and produce the first batch of songs and was signed to Pieater.

In April 2021, Maple Glider announced the release of her debut studio album, alongside the third single "Swimming". In a press release, the artist said the album takes inspiration from vignettes of her life and the perspectives that travel has given her.

=== 2023: I Get into Trouble ===
In May 2023, Maple Glider released "Don't Kiss Me".

In July 2023, Maple Glider released "Dinah" and announced the release of I Get into Trouble, her second studio album scheduled for release on 13 October 2023.

== Discography ==
=== Studio albums ===
List of studio albums released, with year released and label details shown
Title	Details	Peak chart positions	
Title	Details	AUS Artist	SCO
To Enjoy Is the Only Thing	Released: 25 June 2021; Label: Pieater, Partisan (PIE030CD); Formats: CD, LP, Digital download, streaming	18	76
I Get into Trouble	Released: 13 October 2023; Label: Pieater, Partisan (PIE037CD); Formats: CD, LP, digital download, streaming	TBA	

=== Singles ===
List of singles and album name shown
Title	Year	Album
"As Tradition"	2020	To Enjoy Is the Only Thing
"Good Thing"	2021	To Enjoy Is the Only Thing
"Swimming"	2021	To Enjoy Is the Only Thing
"Baby Tiger"	2021	To Enjoy Is the Only Thing
"Don't Kiss Me"	2023	I Get into Trouble
"Dinah"	2023	I Get into Trouble
"You At the Top of the Driveway"	2023	I Get into Trouble
"You're Gonna Be a Daddy"	2023	I Get into Trouble
"Two Years"	2023	I Get into Trouble
"Do You"	2023	I Get into Trouble

== Awards and nominations ==
=== AIR Awards ===
The Australian Independent Record Awards (commonly known informally as AIR Awards) is an annual awards night to recognize, promote, and celebrate the success of Australia's Independent Music sector.

Year	Nominee / work	Award	Result	Ref.
2022	Maple Glider	Breakthrough Independent Artist of the Year	Nominated	
2022	To Enjoy Is the Only Thing	Best Independent Blues and Roots Album or EP	Nominated	
2024	I Get into Trouble	Independent Album of the Year	Nominated	
2024	I Get into Trouble	Best Independent Country Album or EP	Nominated	
2024	"Don't Kiss Me"	Independent Song of the Year	Nominated	
2024	Tom Iansek for Maple Glider - I Get into Trouble	Independent Producer of the Year	Nominated	

=== Music Victoria Awards ===
The Music Victoria Awards are an annual awards night celebrating Victorian music. They commenced in 2005.

Year	Nominee / work	Award	Result	Ref.
2021	Maple Glider	Best Breakthrough Act	Won	
2021	Maple Glider	Best Solo Act	Nominated	
2021	Maple Glider	Best Folk Act	Nominated	
2024	Maple Glider	Best Solo Artist	Won	
