= Shilpa Ray =

American singer-songwriter

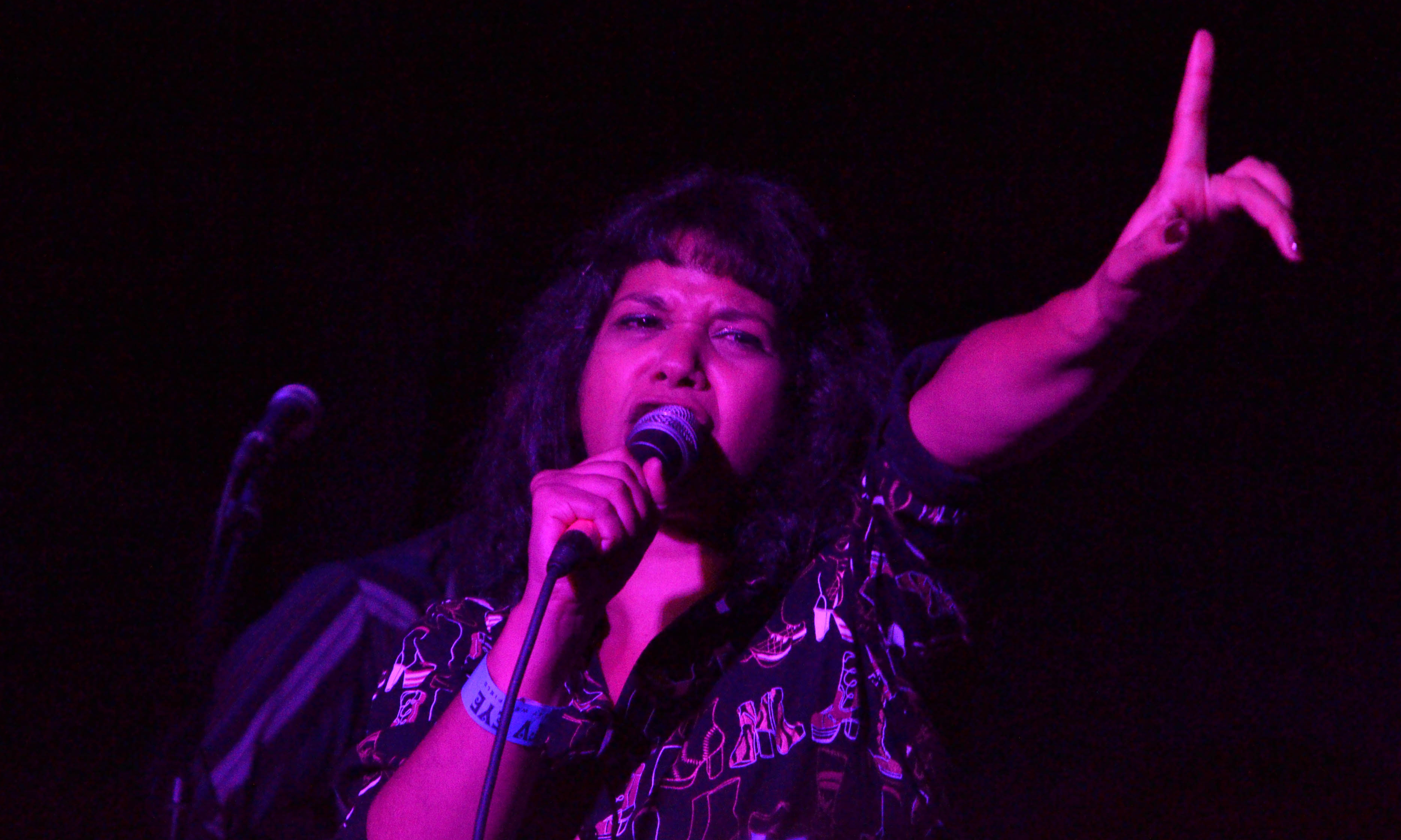
- Ray performing in Brookyln, NY in 2021

Background information
- Genres: Punk rock, blues, garage rock, indie rock, punk blues
- Years active: 2004–present
- Labels: Knitting Factory, Bad Seed LTD, Northern Spy
- Members: Shilpa Ray - vocals, harmonium, piano, organ, synth
- Website: www.shilparay.net

Shilpa Ray (born c. 1980) is an American singer-songwriter from Brooklyn, New York with a DIY punk experimental sound. Her music has been compared to Blondie, The Cramps, and Screamin' Jay Hawkins and her singing has been compared to the style of Patti Smith, Nick Cave, and Ella Fitzgerald. Ray is notable for combining an Indian harmonium with a "big-voiced blues-rock howler" vocal approach and has been known to sing in styles ranging from metal to the balladry of Leonard Cohen. Rob Harvilla of the Village Voice once stated in 2006 that her vocal range could put the entire lineup of Ozzfest to shame.

Starting as a solo performer in 2003, Ray later put together the band Beat the Devil in 2005. After the dissolution of Beat the Devil, Ray formed another band, Shilpa Ray and Her Happy Hookers, which Boston Globe critic Jonathan Perry described as the "best-named band" in a lineup of numerous indie bands in July 2010.

As the principal songwriter and band leader, Ray described her role in her band as being similar to a "democracy under a dictatorship". In an interview, she commented about being a female artist: "I think Feminism in America went through a huge backlash during the W. Bush years. We are now going through a cool Renaissance. There are tons of amazing female musicians and artists on the scene with something to contribute and it's not cheesy, kitschy, or female centric. It's universal."

The band toured extensively with Man Man and Acid Mothers Temple in 2011. They also performed at the SXSW festival that year in Austin, Texas and were invited to the Billboard event at the Buffalo Billiards venue. She offered advice to struggling artists: "The hardship of being an artist in this country is gender neutral. Own yourself, what you do, how you live and don't worry about the end results."

After splitting with Her Happy Hookers in 2011, Shilpa continued under the moniker Shilpa Ray, touring Europe and North America with Nick Cave and the Bad Seeds as a backup singer and also as their supporting act. She recorded a version of "Pirate Jenny" featuring Nick Cave and Warren Ellis for the 2013 compilation album Son of Rogues Gallery: Pirate Ballads, Sea Songs & Chanteys, released by Anti/Epitaph.

She released Last Year's Savage (2015), Door Girl (2017), and Portrait Of A Lady (2022) with Northern Spy Records.

== Career ==
Beat The Devil

- Beat The Devil, 2006

Ray's first project under the moniker of Beat the Devil, combining punk rock music with Indian time signatures in a new format. Beat The Devil was released in the latter half of 2006. The group disbanded soon after releasing their first and only album. Beat the Devil's cover of Suicide's song "Mr. Ray" was released as part of the Alan Vega 70th Birthday Limited Edition EP Series.

Her Happy Hookers

- A Fish Hook An Open Eye 2009, Kepler Records

After dissolving Beat The Devil, Ray went solo with backing band members to form Shilpa Ray and Her Happy Hookers. Produced by Jay Braun and Shilpa Ray, A Fish Hook An Open Eye was released on July 6, 2009.

- Venus Shaver/Natural Selection 7", 2010, Knitting Factory Records

Her second release with Her Happy Hookers, and also the first release on Knitting Factory Records, this 7" limited pressing of 500 copies included a track from her second release on Knitting Factory Records, Venus Shaver.

- Teenage and Torture, 2011, Knitting Factory Records

Shilpa Ray and Her Happy Hookers put out their second full-length record, and first full length on KFR, on January 18, 2011. Teenage and Torture both refines and expands upon the arresting qualities of their first release. The result "isn't as thrown together as the first one", says Ray. "The first record was like a series of thoughts, this is one big thought. You'll slip into a different world when you hear this." Recorded with Black Dirt Studios’ Jason Meagher at Seizure's Palace in Gowanus, Brooklyn, the songs on this album are dark, sardonic looks inside Ray's own world and obsessions, augmented by the musical styling of her Happy Hookers – Nick Hundley on bass, Andrew Bailey on guitar and John Adamski on drums and percussion, and featuring Greg Lewis on organ, Jonathan Lam on pedal steel and Andrew Hoepfner on vocals and keys. The record in turn led to Shilpa supporting a number of Nick Cave tours in addition to an EP released on his label, Bad Seed Ltd.

Shilpa Ray

- It's All Self Fellatio, Shilpa Ray, 2013, Bad Seed LTD

After disbanding Her Happy Hookers and touring Europe and North America with Nick Cave and the Bad Seeds and Grinderman, in 2013 Shilpa Ray released her first EP on Cave's Bad Seed Ltd. label, It's All Self Fellatio. As well as performing with Cave, Ray's band performed with Sharon Van Etten, Jon Spencer Blues Explosion, and Nicole Atkins.

- Make Up/What a Diffr'nce A Day Makes, 2015, Northern Spy Records

Shilpa's first EP release on Northern Spy in 2015, Make Up, included two covers, "Make Up" written by Lou Reed, and Dinah Washington's "What A Diff'rence A Day Makes" with Shilpa Ray on keys and vocals, Jon Delorme on pedal steel, Alistair Paxton on bass, and Russ Lemkim on drums.

- Last Year's Savage, 2015, Northern Spy Records

Ray's first full length on Northern Spy Records, Last Year's Savage was also her first full-length solo record as Shilpa Ray.

- Paisley, 7" 2016, Northern Spy Records
- Door Girl, 2017, Northern Spy Records

Door Girl is her second album on Northern Spy Records.

- Portrait of A Lady 2022, Northern Spy Records.
- Portrait of A Cat Lady/I'm A Ghost, 2025, Northern Spy Records

== Musical style and influences ==
A report in the San Francisco Examiner describes Ray's New Jersey upbringing as an Indian American from an immigrant family as contributing to her having a "scrappy" demeanor. As a youth, she claims she was mistaken for an Iraqi during the Persian Gulf War and was "pelted with beer cans" by racist hooligans at the age of 5. She dealt with restrictive parents who banned Western-themed music and learned to play the harmonium and piano beginning at age six. While a student at West Windsor-Plainsboro High School South, she became a stealth goth and listened to music by punk rock bands such as the Cramps, the Stooges, Joy Division, Bauhaus, and the Velvet Underground. She has also cited influences including Ministry, Billy Idol, Pat Benatar and OMD. In her twenties, she moved to New York City and worked as a solo artist, singing a cappella at first and later accompanying herself on the harmonium, which also happened to be Nico's instrument of choice to suit her distinct voice and delivery.

== Personal life ==
Shilpa Ray currently resides in Brooklyn, New York. She is of Bengali descent.

== Reviews ==
- Music critics from The New York Times have focused on Ray's lyrics and voice. Jon Pareles described Ray's act as combining punk rock band shtick with a touch of goth burlesque but with music which deals with the "contradictory pressures women face" such as being "cosmetically perfect but authentic". Another Times critic, Ben Sisario, summed up Ray's act in four words: "that scream is primal!" Critic Jacob Brown described Ray's voice as a "honey-toned wail" along the lines of Patti Smith merged with Nick Cave.
- Music critic Tris McCall in the Newark Star-Ledger found a feminist message in Ray's lyrics and videos, and described her as "proud to own her discontent."
- Critics in The Guardian described the music as "grinding blues, sleazy jazz, and bracing rock with punk immediacy and pop appeal." Shilpa Ray was "like a vulgar Ella Fitzgerald" singing songs with a "wall of distortion and thunderous, pounding rhythms."

== In other media ==
=== Television series ===
Song	Show title	Episode title
"Liquidation Sale"	Being Human (US)	"All Out of Blood"
