= Sun's Signature =

EP by Elizabeth Fraser and Damon Reece
- Released: June 18, 2022
- Studios: Sibyl's Bower; Rockfield, Sophie and Rena's Cottage; Christchurch; Aerial Studios
- Label: Partisan
- Producers: Elizabeth Fraser; Damon Reece

Sun's Signature is a collaborative extended play by Scottish musician Elizabeth Fraser and British percussionist Damon Reece. It was released on June 18, 2022 via Partisan Records. Recording sessions took place at Sibyl's Bower, at Rockfield, Sophie and Rena's Cottage, at Christchurch and at Aerial Studios. It features contributions from Thighpaulsandra, Sean Cook, Martin Shellard, Alex Lee and Steve Hackett. The album peaked at number 11 on the Official Scottish Albums chart.

== Critical reception ==
Professional ratings
Aggregate scores
Source	Rating
Metacritic	80/100
Review scores
Source	Rating
Beats Per Minute	76/100
Mojo	4/5 stars
Pitchfork	8/10
Rolling Stone	4/5 stars
The Observer	4/5 stars

Sun's Signature was met with generally favorable reviews from music critics. At Metacritic, which assigns a normalized rating out of 100 to reviews from mainstream publications, the album received an average score of 80, based on eight reviews.

== Track listing ==
No.	Title	Length
1.	"Underwater"	6:45
2.	"Golden Air"	5:42
3.	"Bluedusk"	5:00
4.	"Apples"	7:27
5.	"Make Lovely the Day"	2:29

== Personnel ==
- Elizabeth Fraser – vocals, Mellotron, Moog, producer
- Damon Reece – drums, percussion, bass pedals, bass guitar, keyboards, programming, cimbalom, vibes, Optigan, producer, engineering
- Timothy "Thighpaulsandra" Lewis – RMI, CS80, Mellotron, Solina, mixing
- Sean Cook – bass guitar
- Martin Shellard – bass guitar, electric guitar
- Alex Lee – 6 & 12 string guitars, acoustic guitar
- Steve Hackett – foundry guitars, electric guitars, effects, Optigan, nylon guitar, lead guitar
- Bob Locke – mixing
- Matt Smith – mixing assistant
- Shawn Joseph – mastering

== Charts ==
Chart performance for Sun's Signature
Chart (2023)	Peak position
Scottish Albums (Official Charts)	11
UK Album Downloads (Official Charts)	44
UK Independent Albums (Official Charts)	8
