= NoSo =

American musician

Baek Hwong (born 1997), known professionally as NoSo, is a Korean-American singer-songwriter, guitarist, producer, and composer. NoSo is known for their 2022 debut album, Stay Proud of Me.

== Early life and influences ==
NoSo was born Baek Hwong on May 14, 1997, in Chicago, Illinois. They grew up attending a music festival at a venue where musicians such as B. B. King, Bonnie Raitt, and Aretha Franklin performed. They participated in theater classes during their childhood and performed in productions such as West Side Story.

At 12, NoSo decided to pursue their own musical endeavors. They initially took guitar lessons at a local music store before deciding to learn to play the guitar on their own in their family's basement. When they were 16, NoSo moved to Los Angeles and began writing music. Eventually, NoSo pursued their undergraduate education at the University of Southern California's Thornton School of Music, where they studied popular music.

== Career ==
NoSo signed with Partisan Records under the stage name NoSo.

In 2019, NoSo participated in NPR Music's Tiny Desk Concert.

NoSo's debut album is entitled Stay Proud of Me. NoSo began to lay the groundwork for their debut album in 2017, and eventually recorded the work in their family's condominium during the COVID-19 quarantine. The guitar-led album was released on July 8, 2022, as a coming-of-age story that encapsulates NoSo's experiences with their gender and racial identity. The cover art for the album was inspired by Korean records from the 1980s that NoSo's parents played for them when they were younger.

NoSo has described songwriting as a means of exploring and articulating their transgender identity. Several songs draw from their experiences as a trans Korean American raised in a predominantly White community. They wrote the song "Parasites" while recovering from gender-affirming top surgery.

For their sophomore album, When Are You Leaving?, Hwong told Argus Far that Wong Kar-wai's "visual aesthetics inspired the album cover and the moodiness of the record."
