= The Standard (band) =

American indie rock band

The Standard are an American indie rock band from Portland, Oregon.

== History ==
The Standard was formed in Portland in 1999 out of members who had all previously played in Portland indie groups. The group signed with Touch and Go Records in 2002 for one release and had two releases on Yep Roc in 2004–05. In 2008, they released their last album Swimmer on Partisan Records, a label co-founded by Tim Putnam.

== Members ==
- Tim Putnam – vocals, guitar
- Jay Clarke – keyboards
- Rob Oberdorfer – bass
- Rob Duncan – drums

== Discography ==
- The Standard (Barbaric Records, 2001)
- August (Touch and Go Records, 2002)
- Wire Post to Wire (Yep Roc, 2004)
- Albatross (Yep Roc, 2005)
- Swimmer (Partisan Records, 2008)
