= Patrolled By Radar =

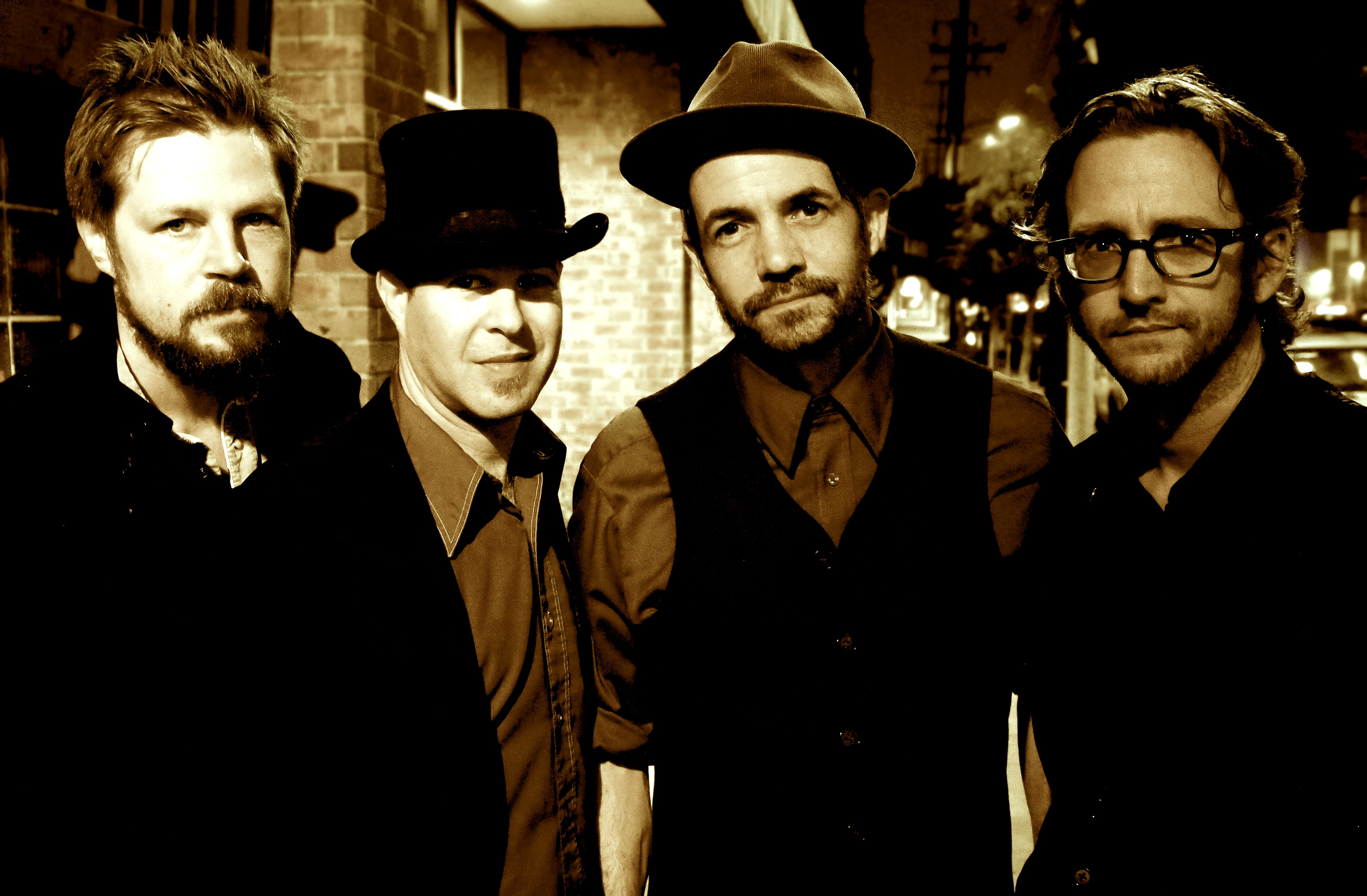

Background information
- Origin: Los Angeles, CA, USA
- Genres: British Invasion; Cowpunk; Americana; Alternative country Roots music Folk; Rock; Country; Blues; Soul
- Years active: 2010-present
- Members: Jay Souza: songwriter, lead vocals, acoustic guitar, blues harp Bosco Sheff: lead guitar, slide guitar, backing vocals Ben Johnsen: drums, backing vocals
- Past members: Preston Mann: organ, piano, accordion

Patrolled By Radar (PBR) is a roots rock trio based in Los Angeles. The band blends alt-country, blues and soul with "equal parts British invasion, cow-punk and Americana, songwriting respected as craft".

After dismantling his group 50 Cent Haircut, which had been an institution in the US southwest for over a decade and performed over 1,000 shows, folksinger Souza formed PBR in 2010 with lead guitarist and longtime bandmate Bosco Sheff, both of whom are from Boston, Massachusetts.

Shortly thereafter, they were joined by drummer Ben Johnsen, a veteran of the New York City music scene from Hackensack, New Jersey. The sound post-production and Emmy-winner Preston Mann, from Paisley, Scotland, played with the group on Hammond Organ and piano from 2012 to 2014.

Managed for their first two years by Knitting Factory Entertainment's CEO, Morgan Margolis, they released their first album, Be Happy, in June 2011, on Knitting Factory Records. Recorded and mixed by the Grammy-nominated producer Peter Curry of the group Los Straitjackets, the record received good reviews. On that momentum, they toured in direct support of the Grammy winners Los Lonely Boys, playing to capacity audiences in concert theaters throughout the Pacific Northwest and Midwest. A review of their performance at The Wilma Theater in Missoula, Montana, described PBR as "classic heartland rock and roll, providing an old school Bob Dylan and The Band vibe".

In 2013, the group independently released a full-length studio album of cover versions titled Cards, Gifts & Caskets Vol. 1. They finished a full-length original record titled "Cool Your Jets", set for release early 2014. Both, were produced by Peter Curry.

"With a timeless narrative style" PBR is a consummate bar band in the 1970s pub rock tradition and has played with Porter Wagoner, Marty Stuart, Taj Mahal, Dave Davies Kinks Chronicles, The Jayhawks, Tim Finn and Richard Thompson, Holly Golightly and the Brokeoffs, and The Gourds.

"A mixture of Bob Dylan lyrics with Ray Davies passion, add a dash of Johnny Cash swagger and throw in a Wilco-type musical journey, and you have Patrolled By Radar."

== Discography ==
- Be Happy, June 2011, Knitting Factory Records
- Cards, Gifts, & Caskets Vol 1, 2012
- Cool Your Jets, early 2014
