= Not Exotic =

Studio album by Dolorean
- Released: November 4, 2003
- Recorded: December 2001 – July 2002; Larry Crane's Jackpot Studio
- Genre: Indie rock
- Label: Yep Roc
- Producer: Jeff Saltzman

Dolorean chronology
Not Exotic (2003)	Violence in the Snowy Fields (2004)

Not Exotic is the debut full-length album by Dolorean, released in 2003 on Yep Roc Records. The songs grew out of frontman Al James's home recordings. It met with a largely positive reception in the music press.

== History ==
=== Production and release ===
Dolorean began recordings its debut LP in 2001, with rock producer Jeff Saltzman engineering the album and providing the bass lines at Larry Crane's Jackpot Studio. To perform the music live, James Adair joined the group on bass. Copies of Not Exotic were self-released by the band in the middle of 2002, though the official release came a year later in November 2003, when the band signed a two-album deal with Yep Roc Records in North Carolina.

=== Release and reception ===
Professional ratings
Review scores
Source	Rating
AllMusic	4.5/5 stars
The New York Times	(positive)
Pitchfork Media	6.6/10
PopMatters	(positive)

"The songs gesture at folk and country, but they do it quietly and slowly, as if hesitant to disturb Mr. James’s delicate parables. And yet, despite the stillness, this is a wild, passionate album.”
— Kelefa Sanneh of The New York Times (November 9, 2013)

The album was well received by critics, and Kelefa Sanneh of The New York Times featured the band and album in the publication on November 9, 2013, writing that the band were part of "the legacy of the late Elliott Smith: a generation of indie-rock songwriters... using their own ramshackle voices to sing their own stories of creeping sadness and fleeting joy," and calling it "a wild, passionate album.”

AllMusic gave it a glowing review and a score of 4.5/5, writing that "even with the addition of understated percussion, shimmering synth and piano, and stately cello, the record still runs on James' sharply rendered lyricisms and quietly deliberate guitar work." The review further went on the state that the album's "confessional or diary quality aligns Dolorean with avant folk, but it's not that simple," as the album at times incorporates genres such as slowcore. Pitchfork Media gave it a more mixed score of 6.6/10, while PopMatters praised the release and the variety of songs.

== Track listing ==
All songs written by Al James.

No.	Title	Length
1.	"Morning Watch"	3:01
2.	"Traded For Fire"	4:51
3.	"Jenny Place Your Bets"	4:32
4.	"The Light Behind My Head"	3:43
5.	"Still Here With Me"	4:46
6.	"So You're a Touring Band Now"	3:04
7.	"Sleeperhold"	5:50
8.	"Hannibal, MO"	5:41
9.	"Spoil Your Dawn"	3:16

== Personnel ==
- Al James – vocals, guitar
- Jay Clarke – piano, organ, guitar, percussion
- Ben Nugent – drums, percussion, backing vocals
- Jeff Saltzman – producer, bass, guitar, mandolin
