= Ages and Ages =

US rock band from Portland, Oregon

- Origin: Portland, Oregon
- Genres: indie folk
- Years active: 2009–present
- Members: Tim Perry; Rob Oberdorfer; Evan Railton
- Past members: Becca Schultz; Levi Cecil; John McDonald; Jade Brings Plenty; Daniel Hunt; Lisa Stringfield; Kate O'Brien Clarke; Graham Arthur Mackenzie; Liz Robins; Annie Bethancourt; Ezza Rose; Sarah Riddle; Ash Dybvig; Dustin Dybvig; Nate Munski; Colin Jenkins
- Website: agesandages.com

Ages and Ages is an American rock band from Portland, Oregon.

The group was included as Portland's 2011 Best New band by Willamette Week.

In 2011 they signed a record deal with Partisan Records and were dropped from the roster in 2017.

In 2013 the band changed their name from AgesandAges to Ages and Ages.

== Career ==
Ages and Ages was formed in 2009, founded by Tim Perry (vocals, guitar), Rob Oberdorfer (bass, percussion, vocals), Graham Arthur Mackenzie (percussion, vocals), Kate O'Brien-Clarke (violin, percussion, vocals), Lisa Stringfield (vocals, percussion), Liz Robins (vocals, percussion) and Daniel Hunt (drums, percussion, vocals), alongside others from Portland's music community. Only two original members remain.

The group previously drew "significant sonic influence from his religious upbringing" and from having seven members helps achieve a "congregation sound" even though the lyrics are basically secular thematically.

In 2011, they released a video for the song "Navy Parade," which was directed by Alicia J. Rose. Alright You Restless was produced by Kevin Robinson. In 2014 the band released the album Divisionary which was produced by Tony Lash.

In August 2016, Ages and Ages released their third record Something to Ruin on Partisan Records. The album was recorded at Isaac Brock's, Ice Cream Party Studios with the Modest Mouse front-man adding guitar to the track "So Hazy". Ages and Age's emphasis on featuring electronic and synthetic sounds makes Something to Ruin a departure from their previous albums.

== Discography ==
=== Albums ===
Year	Title	Record label	Ref.
2011	Alright You Restless	Knitting Factory Records / AgesandAges	
2014	Divisionary	Ages and Ages / Partisan Records	
2016	Something to Ruin	Partisan Records	
2019	Me You They We	Needle and Thread Records	
2026	Fine Thanks and You	Needle and Thread Records	

=== EPs & Singeles ===
Year	Title	Record label	Type	Ref.
2018	Needle and Thread	Needle and Thread Records	Single	
2018	Day from Night	Needle and Thread Records	Single	
2019	Just My Luck	Needle and Thread Records	EP	
2019	How It Feels	Needle and Thread Records	Single	
2019	Nothing Serious	Needle and Thread Records	EP	
