= Chalice Hymnal (album) =

Studio album by Grails
- Released: February 17, 2017
- Length: 50:13
- Label: Temporary Residence

Grails chronology
Deep Politics (2011)	Chalice Hymnal (2017)	Anches En Maat (2023)

Professional ratings
Aggregate scores
Source	Rating
Metacritic	78/100
Review scores
Source	Rating
AllMusic	4/5 stars
Drowned in Sound	6/10
MusicOMH	4/5 stars
PopMatters	8/10
Pitchfork	7.7/10

Chalice Hymnal is the seventh studio album by American band Grails. It was released on February 17, 2017 through Temporary Residence Limited.

== Track listing ==
No.	Title	Length
1.	"Chalice Hymnal"	4:22
2.	"Pelham"	2:48
3.	"Empty Chamber"	2:32
4.	"New Prague"	4:50
5.	"Deeper Politics"	3:48
6.	"Tough Guy"	3:56
7.	"Rebecca"	3:47
8.	"Deep Snow II"	5:47
9.	"The Moth & the Flame"	4:07
10.	"Thorns II"	3:58
11.	"After the Funeral"	10:18

== Personnel ==
Grails

- Emil Amos – drums, guitars, bass, MPC, keyboards, lap steel guitar, mixing
- Alex John Hall – guitars, Mellotron, samples, mixing, design/layout
- Wm. Zak Riles – synthesizers, guitar, oud; drums (6)

Additional musicians

- Niklas Kraft – tenor saxophone (1, 7, 9)
- Ash Black Bufflo – synthesizers (2)
- Timba Harris – strings & arrangements (5, 11)
- Dylan Rice-Leary – harmonica (5)
- Ross Gallagher – double bass (7, 11)
- Daniel Fisher-Lochhead – saxophone (11)

Production

- Al Carlson – engineering (4, 5, 8, 10, 11)
- Brandon Eggleston – drums recording (2)
- Jeff Stuart Saltzmand – guitars recording (4)
- Josh Bonati – mastering
