= Greg Gonzalez =

American musician (born 1982)

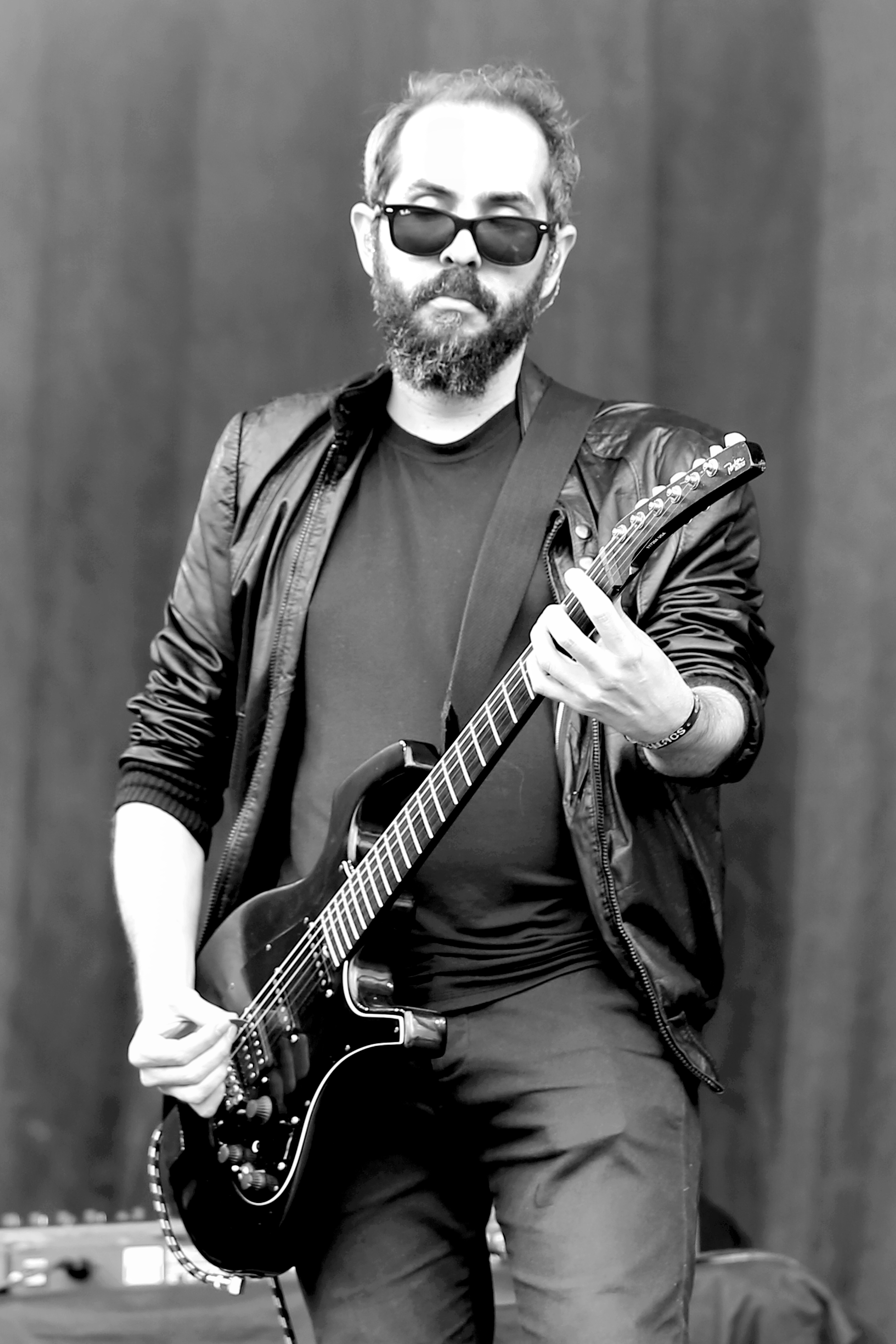
- Gonzalez in 2019

Background information
- Born: Gregory Steven Gonzalez; September 28, 1982 (age 44); El Paso, Texas, U.S.
- Occupations: Singer; songwriter; guitarist; record producer
- Instruments: Vocals; guitar
- Years active: 2008-present
- Member of: Cigarettes After Sex

Gregory Steven Gonzalez (born September 28, 1982) is an American singer-songwriter, guitarist, and record producer. He is best known for being the founder, lead vocalist and guitarist for the dream pop band Cigarettes After Sex.

== Early life ==
Born on September 28, 1982 in El Paso, Texas, Gonzalez began his interest in music at the age of 10, when he bought his first guitar and immediately started writing songs, leading to his first-written song, "The Ocean", which was an instrumental. At the same age, he first introduced himself to heavy metal music, which he learned to play the guitar from and later joined a metal band. Attempting to find his musical style, he would then experiment with jazz and dance music styles.

Growing up, Gonzalez was heavily inspired by French singer Françoise Hardy and her album La question (1971), along with other artists such as Marvin Gaye, the Everly Brothers and Chet Baker, as well as film composers including Hans Zimmer, Ennio Morricone and Danny Elfman. He was also inspired by Michael Jackson, explaining that he was born when Jackson's album Thriller (1982) was released and his fame made him want to perform music.

== Music career ==
Wanting to be part of a "huge" band, Gonzalez would form Cigarettes After Sex in his hometown in 2008. Four years after their formation, they released their debut EP I., which was recorded in a four-floor stairway at the University of Texas at El Paso. The band released their self-titled debut studio album in 2017.

Cigarettes After Sex's second album Cry was released in 2019.

In 2022, Gonzalez released Charm of Pleasure, a collaborative EP with Italian composer Daniele Luppi, which was supported by two singles; "You Never Loved" and "The Rose You Kept".

Gonzalez and Cigarettes After Sex released their third album X's in 2024.

On April 12, 2026, Gonzalez joined as a special guest at Karol G's headlining Coachella 2026 set, where they performed a new track, "Después de Ti". During the performance, both artists stood back to back, with Gonzalez providing the song's guitar arrangements. They later officially released the track onto music streaming platforms on April 23. It debuted at number 96 on the US Billboard Hot 100, number six on the Hot Latin Songs chart and topped the Hot Latin Pop Songs chart, earning 3.8 million official streams and 1,000 downloads, becoming Gonzalez's first chart entries.

== Discography ==
=== Extended plays ===
List of extended plays, with selected details
Title	Details
Charm of Pleasure (with Daniele Luppi)	Released: September 16, 2022; Label: Verve; Formats: Digital download, streaming

=== Singles ===
List of singles, showing year released, selected chart positions, and associated album
Title	Year	Peak chart positions				Album
Title	Year	US	US Latin	US Latin Pop	COL	Album
"You Never Loved" (with Daniele Luppi)	2022	—	—	—	—	Charm of Pleasure
"The Rose You Kept" (with Daniele Luppi)	2022	—	—	—	—	Charm of Pleasure
"Después de Ti" (with Karol G)	2026	96	6	1	84	No Me Arrepiento de Sentir Tanto
