= Paul Banks =

Paul Banks may refer to:

- Paul Banks (American singer)
- Paul Banks (English musician)
- Paul Banks (jazz pianist)
- Paul N. Banks (1934–2000), American librarian

== See also ==
- Paul Banke (born 1964), American boxer
- Paul Banks and Carolyn Harris Preservation Award, by the Association for Library Collections and Technical Services (ALCTS)
