= Grails (band) =

American instrumental rock band

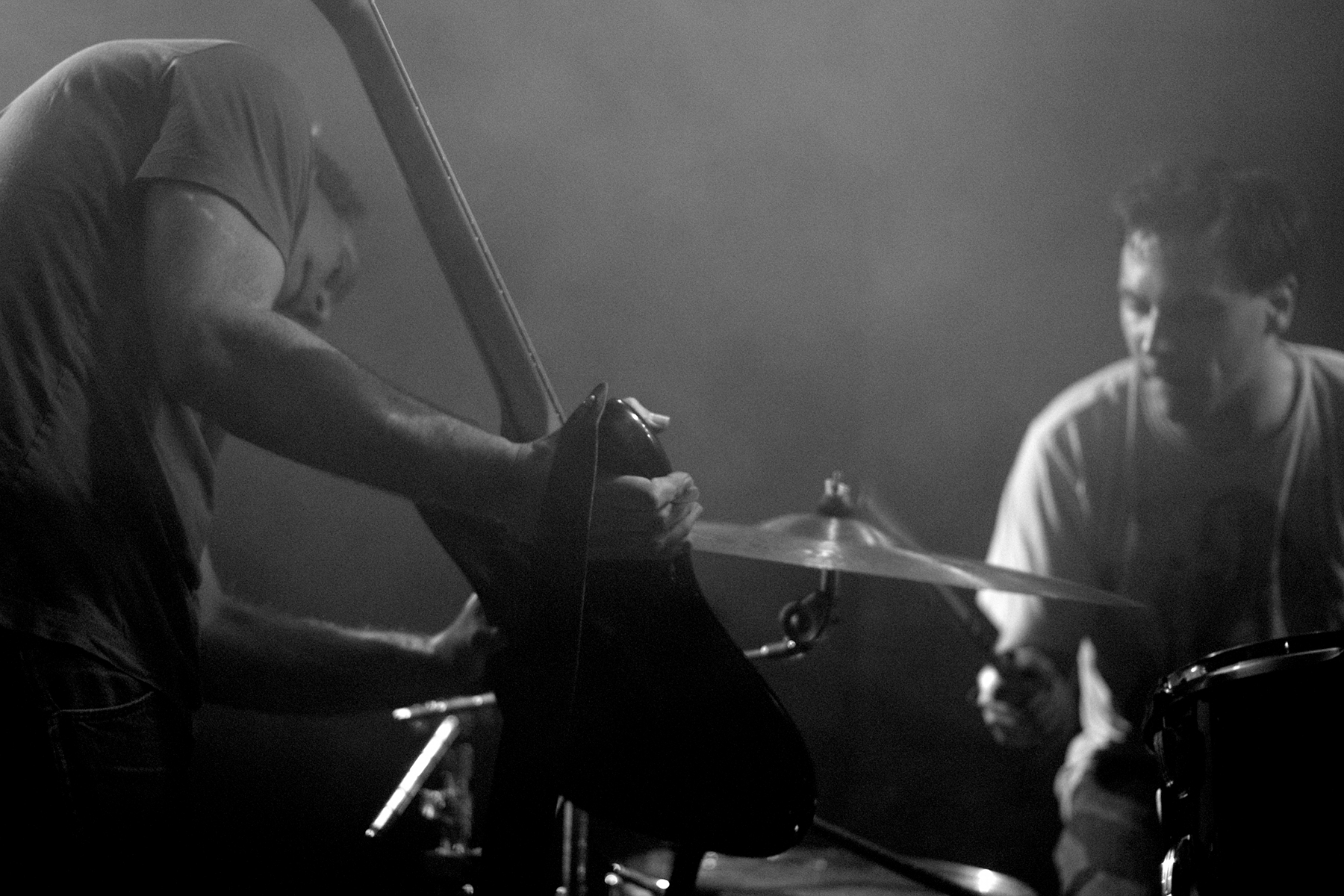
- Grails at La Maroquinerie, Paris 2009

Background information
- Origin: Portland, Oregon, U.S.
- Genres: Instrumental rock, post-rock, psychedelic rock
- Years active: 1999–present
- Labels: Neurot, Robotic Empire, Aurora Borealis, Southern, Temporary Residence, Important Records
- Members: Alex John Hall; Emil Amos; Jesse Bates; Ilyas Ahmed
- Past members: William Slater; Spitz; Timothy Horner; Zak Riles; Ben Nugent
- Website: grails.bandcamp.com

Grails is an American instrumental experimental rock band formed in 1999. Based in Portland, Oregon, the group have released seven studio albums, on labels including Southern and Temporary Residence, and have toured across North America and Europe.

== History ==
Grails was formed under the name "Laurel Canyon" in 1999 by guitarist Alex Hall, drummer Emil Amos (also of Holy Sons and Om) and second guitarist Paul Spitz. They garnered positive reactions following their first show, played on a whim. Portland musicians Timothy Horner (violin) and Bill Slater (piano/bass) later joined the group to record their first EP.

The band then released two self-financed EPs in 2000 and 2001. Paul Spitz left the US to travel in Turkey and Zak Riles joined as guitarist, often playing more of an acoustic role. In 2002, Hall sent a promotion CD to Neurot Recordings who were convinced of the band's potential.

In 2003, just before the release of their first full-length album, the band changed its name to Grails. They adopted a louder, more aggressive style, often switching instruments with each member writing songs that saw them branching out to increasingly disparate styles.

Early in 2005 after a European tour, Horner suddenly left the band, as of 2018 Hall still had not heard from him. The band carried on with only four players recording and releasing the Black Tar Prophecies series which is described as "... revealing their fondness for the '60s and '70s experimental artists that saw music as a process of discovery."

The group often picks up an extra musician for tours, allowing Amos to switch between guitar and drums and expanding the live instrumentation. Recently, Randall Dunn and Dave Abramson have joined the group live.

In their early years, Grails only toured Europe, but have switched to focusing on the East Coast of the United States in the last few years. Despite living in Portland, the band rarely plays live shows in their hometown.

In 2006, Important Records released a CD compilation of the first three Black Tar Prophecies series.

A compilation DVD was released on April 7, 2009, called Acid Rain summing up their most productive period. In 2010, the band had re-issued three releases, including versions of their first two albums remastered by Carl Saff. In the same year a vinyl issue of Black Tar Prophecies Vols. 1, 2, & 3 was released by Important Records. Also released on Important as a vinyl-only EP was Black Tar Prophecies Vol. 4.

The band released their album, Deep Politics, on March 8, 2011, under the label Temporary Residence Limited.

In October 2012, the band released a split LP with the Finnish band Pharaoh Overlord on Kemado Records. The Grails side of the LP is called Black Tar Prophecies Vol. 5.

The band released their album Chalice Hymnal on February 17, 2017, on the label Temporary Residence.

In 2023, Grails released Anches En Maat, again by Temporary Residence. The album featured much more of an 80's inspired sound. “After a band has existed for 20 years, there are things you’ve always wanted to try on the back burner that you’ve never had the room to approach,” the band’s Emil Amos said in a statement.

=== Side projects ===
The various members stay busy with several different projects. Hall has played guitar with Steve Von Till of Neurosis in Von Till's project Harvestman, Amos has played drums with Jandek, produced for Yellow Swans. Hall & Amos have their own genre-blurring duo, Lilacs & Champagne, who have released music on the Mexican Summer label.

== Equipment ==
The band has frequently used the Marxophone on records for its high register and Eastern sound.

== Discography ==
- The Burden of Hope (2003)
- Redlight (2004)
- Interpretations of Three Psychedelic Rock Songs from Around the World (EP) (2005)
- Black Tar Prophecies Vol's 1, 2, & 3 (compilation) (2006)
- Burning Off Impurities (2007)
- Take Refuge in Clean Living (2008)
- Doomsdayer's Holiday (2008)
- Deep Politics (2011) carried on with only four player
- Black Tar Prophecies Vols. 4, 5, & 6 (compilation) (2013)
- Chalice Hymnal (2017)
- Anches En Maat (2023)
- Miracle Music (2025)
