= JBM =

American songwriter

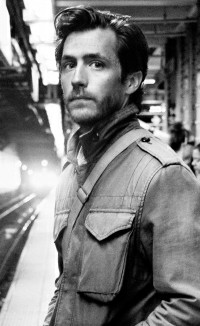
- Jesse Marchant

Background information
- Born: Jesse Brian Marchant; 1980s Montreal, Quebec, Canada
- Genres: Folk rock, pop rock
- Occupations: Singer-songwriter, guitarist
- Years active: Since 2008; 18 years ago
- Label: Partisan Records
- Website: jbm-music.com

Jesse Brian Marchant, better known by his stage name JBM, is a Canadian singer-songwriter. In 2011, he signed a recording contract with American label Partisan Records.

== Early life and education ==
Marchant was born in Montreal, Quebec. He was classically trained in guitar from the age of seven. As a young man, Marchant lived in his family's home in the American Adirondack Mountains for three years, living mostly in seclusion, to realize songs that he had written earlier in Los Angeles, California. In 2008, he recorded songs in a church studio in Hudson, New York.

== Career ==
Marchant has toured with Nathaniel Rateliff, Rogue Wave, Avi Buffalo and Sondre Lerche. He has also performed with St. Vincent, Elvis Perkins, and Swedish singer The Tallest Man on Earth. His musical style has been compared to that of Jim James, Justin Vernon, Nick Drake, Neil Young and M. Ward.

== Reception ==
Music critic Nick Gunther described JBM's music as instilling a "unique depth of emotion and feeling." Brittney McKenna in American Songwriter magazine wrote that there was a "level of peace and of stillness unique to a church" in Marchant's debut album and that his music "feels like one man's soft, musical prayer for hope in a world that too often has too little," and she compared his style to Thom Yorke and Neil Young. JBM's song "Ambitions & War" was described as a "honey-of-a-song" in Future Sounds magazine, with lyrics about a person who is losing their mind in Los Angeles.

Clubdistrict.com described the album as "exquisitely crafted" which feels "as weathered and wise as an old home" and which is a "mostly acoustic venture" with "atmospheric arrangements, lyrical purity and unaffected baritone." Mikela Floyd in Filter magazine described the debut album as "heartfelt compositions" reflecting "a meticulous and carefully crafted sound" from a "handcrafted talent." Steven Mansmith in Slowcoustic described the album as "a fantastic album" of 2010 and noted that the video by Brody Baker accompanying JBM's song Not Even in July, with "images of strewn lawn chairs, sunsets and searching through a dark forest" was a "great video for a great song."

== Personal life ==
As of 2011, he lived in Brooklyn, New York; Los Angeles; and Upstate New York.

== Discography ==
- Antelope Running, 2021
- Illusion of Love, 2018
- Jesse Marchant, 2014
- Stray Ashes, 2012
- Not Even in July, 2010, Partisan Records
- Not Even in July, 2008, vinyl format

== Awards ==
- Top singer-songwriter 2009, iTunes

== See also ==
- List of Canadian composers
- List of Canadian writers
- List of folk rock artists
- List of guitarists
- List of musicians from Quebec
- List of Partisan Records artists
- List of people from Los Angeles
- List of people from Montreal
- List of people from Brooklyn, New York
- List of singer-songwriters
- Music of Los Angeles
- Music of Montreal
- Music of New York City
