= Cigarettes After Sex =

American dream pop band

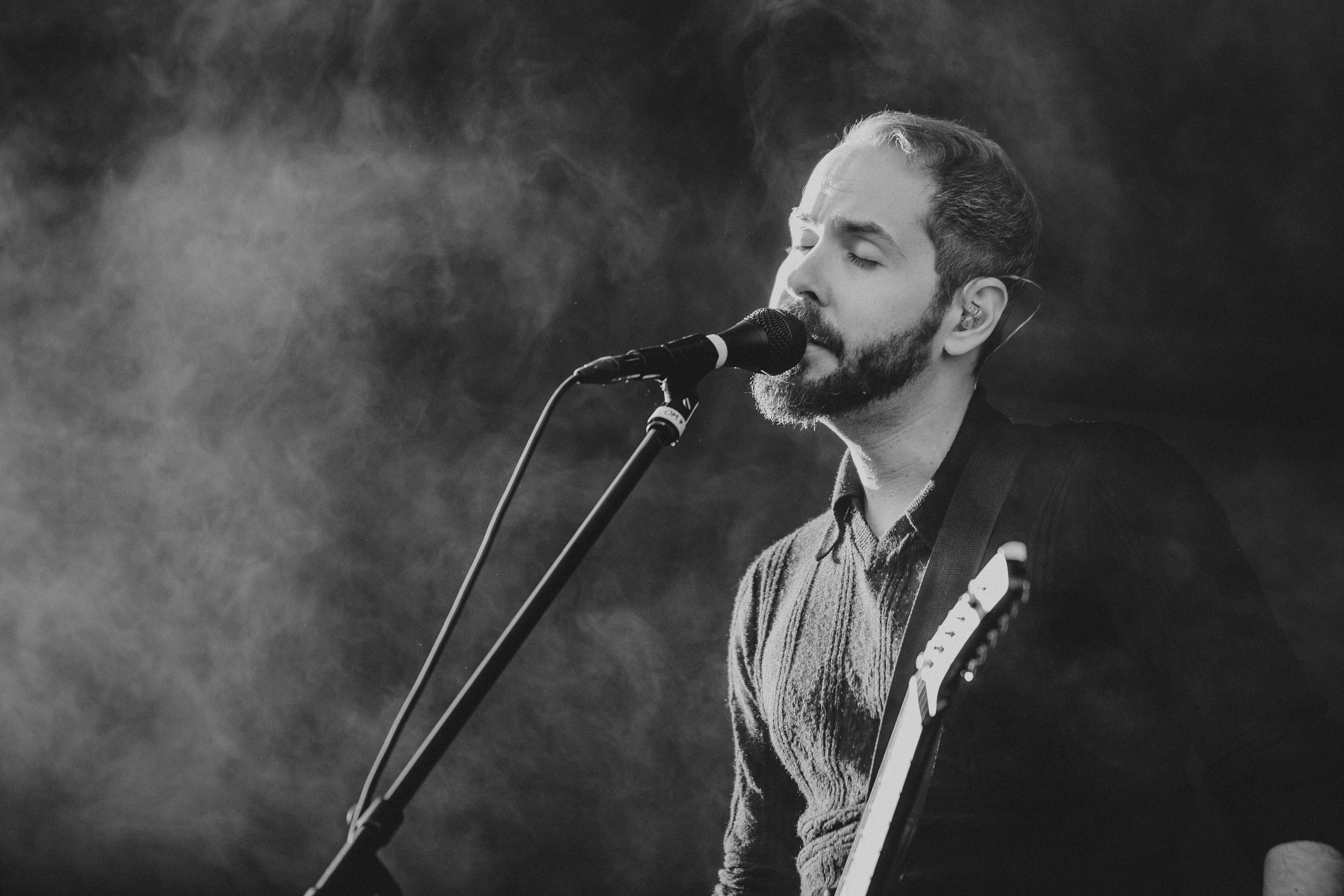
- Greg Gonzalez of Cigarettes After Sex performing at Positivus Festival in July 2017

Background information
- Origin: El Paso, Texas, U.S.
- Genres: Dream pop; shoegaze; ambient pop; slowcore; indie rock
- Years active: 2008–present
- Labels: Partisan; Spanish Prayers
- Members: Greg Gonzalez; Jacob Tomsky; Randall Miller
- Past members: Greg Leah; Steven Herrada; Emily Davis; Phillip Tubbs; Josh Marcus
- Website: www.cigarettesaftersex.com

Cigarettes After Sex is an American dream pop band formed in El Paso, Texas, in 2008 by Greg Gonzalez. The band is known for its ethereal, limerent, and often dream-like musical style, lyrics often based on the themes of love and romance, as well as Gonzalez's voice, which has been described as androgynous. While marketed as an ambient pop band, Cigarettes After Sex are also considered to be shoegaze, slowcore and indie rock.

The band's debut extended play, I., was released in 2012, with the song "Nothing's Gonna Hurt You Baby" eventually becoming a sleeper hit through commercial licensing. After the release of the standalone single "Affection" in 2015, the band released their self-titled debut studio album in 2017 to positive reviews. The second Cigarettes After Sex studio album, Cry, followed in 2019. A third album, X's, was released in July 2024.

== History ==
=== 2008–2015: Formation and debut EP ===
Cigarettes After Sex was formed in El Paso, Texas, by Greg Gonzalez in 2008. According to Gonzalez, the name came to thought after he had a "friendship with certain benefits" with a woman who smoked after they were together.

In 2012, the band recorded their debut EP, I., in a four-story stairway at his alma mater, University of Texas at El Paso, calling the experience "basically an accident; kind of an experiment". The EP's cover art used a photograph by Man Ray, titled "Anatomies", which featured Lee Miller with her head thrown back. In 2015, they later relocated to Brooklyn, New York, where the band's single "Affection" was recorded and released in 2015 along with a cover of REO Speedwagon's "Keep On Loving You".

=== 2016–2018: Recognition and self-titled debut album ===
Around early 2016, years following the release of I., Cigarettes After Sex gained recognition after a fan upload of their song "Nothing's Gonna Hurt You Baby" became popular on YouTube. That same year, the band signed onto Partisan Records, and released their first single under the label, "K.", on November 15.

On March 21, 2017, the band announced their debut studio album, Cigarettes After Sex. On the same day, they released the second single from the album, "Apocalypse". On May 15, they unveiled the album's third single "Each Time You Fall in Love". Their self-titled album was released in its entirety on June 9, 2017, being their first full-length release under Partisan Records.

=== 2019–2023: Cry ===
In August 2019 the band announced their second studio album, titled Cry, along with the single "Heavenly". The album was released on October 25, 2019.

The band released the single "You're All I Want" in 2020, and later released a single titled "Pistol", in November 2022.

In July 2023, the band released a pair of singles, "Bubblegum" and "Stop Waiting". In December 2023, the band released a cover of Radiohead's song "Motion Picture Soundtrack".

=== 2024–present: X's ===
On February 28, 2024, the band announced their third studio album X's. On the same day, they also announced that they would embark on the X's World Tour in support of the album, taking place throughout 2024 and 2025, and released its lead single "Tejano Blue", in which Gonzalez stated was inspired by his years growing up in his hometown. To further the album's promotion, "Dark Vacay" was released on April 16, 2024, as the album's second single, with "Baby Blue Movie" following it on June 4, 2024. X's was released on July 12, 2024, to favorable reception.

On October 21, 2025, the band released another single, an original song titled "Anna Karenina" which was named after the novel and a cover of The Doors' song "The Crystal Ship". On April 12, 2026, Gonzalez was as a special guest for Karol G's headlining set at Coachella 2026, joining her onstage where they performed a new track, "Después de Ti", which later saw an official release on streaming platforms on April 23. On May 19, 2026, the band released the single "Twizzler".

== Musical style and influences ==
In a feature for Noisey by Vice, Christina Cacouris describes Cigarettes After Sex as "elemental, hazy and romantic, but with a noir edge underneath Gonzalez's androgynous voice" as well as "sweet and sentimental". "As the band's name suggests, it's reminiscent of lying in bed, but its ambient qualities don't prevent it from being music you can dance to." Gonzalez cites Françoise Hardy as his favorite singer and Miles Davis as having great impact. In an interview with Sound of Boston, he also noted films such as L'Avventura and The Double Life of Veronique were influential to the feel and sound of the music in "Affection" and their LP. The band also includes the Cowboy Junkies' album The Trinity Session, Julee Cruise, and Cocteau Twins as influences. The music blog Eardrums Music describes the band as "slow, dreamy and beautiful with gorgeous, tender vocals and very good lyrics" and compares it to Mazzy Star. Music bloggers behind Swell Tone describe Cigarettes After Sex as a band producing "melancholy, slow pop that will sweetly rock any listener into a listless stupor."

Reviewing "Affection" for Independentmusicnews.com, Jae Pyl concludes that "there's just such an intimacy to Cigarettes After Sex's sound that it's impossible to not let it into the pit of your belly."

== Members ==
Since inception in 2008, the group has included a number of different members and collaborators led by Greg Gonzalez:

=== Current members ===
- Greg Gonzalez – vocals, guitar
- Randall Miller – bass
- Jacob Tomsky – drums

=== Former members ===
- Josh Marcus - keyboards
- Phillip Tubbs – keyboards, electric guitar
- Greg Leah – visual
- Steve Herrada – keyboards
- Emily Davis – acoustic guitar

== Discography ==
=== Studio albums ===
List of studio albums, with selected chart positions
Title	Details	Peak chart positions										Certifications
Title	Details	US	AUS	AUT	BEL	FRA	GER	NLD	POR	SWI	UK	Certifications
Cigarettes After Sex	Released: June 9, 2017; Label: Partisan; Formats: LP, CD, cassette, digital download	112	81	18	5	42	38	53	21	21	27	RIAA: Platinum; BPI: Gold; SNEP: Platinum
Cry	Released: October 25, 2019; Label: Partisan; Formats: LP, CD, cassette, digital download, streaming	152	61	26	8	27	29	37	1	19	36	RIAA: Gold; BPI: Gold; SNEP: Gold
X's	Released: July 12, 2024; Label: Partisan; Formats: LP, CD, cassette, digital download, streaming	32	32	9	8	24	7	6	7	10	12	

=== Extended plays ===
List of EPs, with selected chart positions
Title	Details	Peak chart positions
Title	Details	UK Sales
I.	Released: July 21, 2012; Label: Self-released; Formats: LP, CD, cassette, digital download	2

=== Singles ===
Title	Year	Peak chart positions										Certifications	Album or EP
Title	Year	US Bub.	US Rock	BEL	CAN	FRA	GRE Intl.	LTU	POR	UK Indie	WW	Certifications	Album or EP
"Affection"	2015	—	—	—	—	—	—	—	—	—	—		Non-album single
"K."	2016	—	—	— (Note: "K." did not register on the Ultratop 50 Singles chart, but charted as an "extra tip" on the Ultratip chart.)	—	—	85	—	—	—	—	RIAA: Platinum; BPI: Platinum; IFPI GRE: Platinum; SNEP: Platinum	Cigarettes After Sex
"Apocalypse"	2017	16	18	85	83	87	21	27	185	25	129	RIAA: 2× Platinum; AFP: Platinum; BPI: Gold; IFPI GRE: 3× Platinum; SNEP: Platinum	Cigarettes After Sex
"Each Time You Fall in Love"	2017	—	—	—	—	—	—	—	—	—	—		Cigarettes After Sex
"Sweet"	2017	—	—	—	—	—	—	—	—	—	—	BPI: Gold	Cigarettes After Sex
"Crush"	2018	—	—	86	—	—	—	—	—	—	—		Non-album singles
"Neon Moon"	2018	—	—	— (Note: "Neon Moon" did not register on the Ultratop 50 Singles chart, but charted as an "extra tip" on the Ultratip chart.)	—	—	—	—	—	—	—		Non-album singles
"Heavenly"	2019	—	—	64	—	57	—	—	—	—	—	BPI: Silver; SNEP: Gold	Cry
"Falling in Love"	2019	—	—	— (Note: "Falling in Love" did not register on the Ultratop 50 Singles chart, but charted as an "extra tip" on the Ultratip chart.)	—	—	—	—	—	—	—		Cry
"You're All I Want"	2020	—	—	— (Note: "You're All I Want" did not register on the Ultratop 50 Singles chart, but charted as an "extra tip" on the Ultratip chart.)	—	—	—	—	—	—	—		Non-album singles
"Pistol"	2022	—	41	—	—	—	—	—	—	—	—		Non-album singles
"Bubblegum"	2023	—	—	—	—	—	—	—	—	—	—		Non-album singles
"Motion Picture Soundtrack"	2023	—	—	—	—	—	—	—	—	—	—		Non-album singles
"Tejano Blue"	2024	—	36	—	—	—	—	—	—	—	—		X's
"Dark Vacay"	2024	—	—	—	—	—	—	—	—	—	—		X's
"Baby Blue Movie"	2024	—	—	—	—	—	—	—	—	—	—		X's
"Anna Karenina"	2025	—	—	—	—	—	—	—	—	—	—		Non-album singles
"Twizzler"	2026	—	—	—	—	—	—	—	—	—	—		Non-album singles
"—" denotes a release that did not chart or was not issued in that region.

=== Other charted and certified songs ===
Title	Year	Peak chart positions			Certifications	Album
Title	Year	GRE Intl.	NZ Hot	WW Excl. US	Certifications	Album
"Nothing's Gonna Hurt You Baby"	2012	—	—	—	BPI: Gold	I.
"Sunsetz"	2017	68	—	—	BPI: Gold; IFPI DEN: Gold; IFPI GRE: Platinum	Cigarettes After Sex
"Cry"	2019	84	—	170	BPI: Gold; IFPI GRE: Platinum	Cry
"X's"	2024	—	32	—		X's
"—" denotes a release that did not chart or was not issued in that region.

=== Demos ===
- I Can See You (2009)
- Cigarettes After Sex (Romans 13:9) (2011)
