= Journal of Basic Microbiology =

- Discipline: Microbiology
- Language: English
- Edited by: Erika Kothe

Publication details
- Former name(s): Zeitschrift für allgemeine Mikrobiologie
- History: 1960–present
- Publisher: Wiley-VCH
- Frequency: Monthly
- Open access: Hybrid
- Impact factor: 2.281 (2020)

Standard abbreviations
- ISO 4: J. Basic Microbiol.

Indexing
- CODEN: JBMIEQ
- ISSN: 0233-111X (print); 1521-4028 (web)
- LCCN: 85640381
- OCLC no.: 12062185

Links
- Journal homepage; Online access; Online archive

The Journal of Basic Microbiology is a monthly peer-reviewed scientific journal focusing on microbiology. It was established in 1960 as the Zeitschrift für allgemeine Mikrobiologie and obtained its current title in 1985. The editor-in-chief is Erika Kothe.

According to the Journal Citation Reports, the journal has a 2020 impact factor of 2.281, ranking it 111th out of 137 journals in the category "Microbiology".
