= Cigarettes After Sex (album) =

Studio album by Cigarettes After Sex
- Released: June 9, 2017
- Recorded: December 2015 (Brooklyn, New York); May 2016 (Manhattan, New York) (Note: "Each Time You Fall in Love")
- Genres: Dream pop; slowcore
- Length: 47:04
- Label: Partisan
- Producer: Greg Gonzalez

Cigarettes After Sex chronology
| I. (2012) | Cigarettes After Sex (2017) | Cry (2019) |

Singles from Cigarettes After Sex
- 1. "K." Released: December 1, 2016; 2. "Apocalypse" Released: March 20, 2017; 3. "Each Time You Fall in Love" Released: May 16, 2017; 4. "Sweet" Released: August 29, 2017

Cigarettes After Sex is the debut studio album by American dream pop band Cigarettes After Sex. It was released on June 9, 2017, by Partisan Records and received positive reviews from critics. As of May 2018, it had sold over 20,000 copies in the United Kingdom.

== Recording ==
The recording sessions for Cigarettes After Sex took place in 2015, in Brooklyn, New York, with most songs being recorded live with a small audience.

== Promotion ==
"K." was released on December 1, 2016 as the album's lead single. Along with the announcement of their album, "Apocalypse" was released on March 20, 2017 as its second single. "Each Time You Fall in Love" was released on May 16, 2017 as the third single from Cigarettes After Sex, along with dates for its accompanying World Tour. "Sweet" was released as the fourth single from the album on August 29, 2017.

== Reception ==
Professional ratings
Aggregate scores
| Source | Rating |
|---|---|
| AnyDecentMusic? | 7.5/10 |
| Metacritic | 75/100 |
Review scores
| Source | Rating |
| AllMusic | 3/5 stars |
| The A.V. Club | B |
| Financial Times | 4/5 stars |
| The Guardian | 4/5 stars |
| Mojo | 4/5 stars |
| Pitchfork | 7.4/10 |
| PopMatters | 8/10 |
| Q | 4/5 stars |
| Record Collector | 4/5 stars |
| Uncut | 6/10 |

=== Accolades ===
Accolades for Cigarettes After Sex
| Publication | Accolade | Year | Rank | Ref. |
|---|---|---|---|---|
| Rough Trade | Albums of the Year | 2017 | 6 | |

== Track listing ==
All tracks are written by Greg Gonzalez.

Cigarettes After Sex track listing
| No. | Title | Length |
|---|---|---|
| 1. | "K." | 5:19 |
| 2. | "Each Time You Fall in Love" | 4:50 |
| 3. | "Sunsetz" | 3:34 |
| 4. | "Apocalypse" | 4:50 |
| 5. | "Flash" | 4:34 |
| 6. | "Sweet" | 4:51 |
| 7. | "Opera House" | 6:04 |
| 8. | "Truly" | 4:03 |
| 9. | "John Wayne" | 4:18 |
| 10. | "Young & Dumb" | 4:33 |
| Total length: | | 47:04 |

== Personnel ==
Cigarettes After Sex

- Greg Gonzalez – vocals, electric and acoustic guitars, recording, production
- Phillip Tubbs – keyboards
- Randy Miller – bass, graphic design
- Jacob Tomsky – drums

Additional personnel

- Rocky Gallo – recording on "Each Time You Fall In Love", mixing
- Greg Calbi – mastering

== Charts ==
=== Weekly charts ===
Weekly chart performance for Cigarettes After Sex
| Chart (2017–2018) | Peak position |
|---|---|
| Australian Albums (ARIA) | 96 |
| Austrian Albums (Ö3 Austria) | 18 |
| Belgian Albums (Ultratop Flanders) | 5 |
| Belgian Albums (Ultratop Wallonia) | 12 |
| Czech Albums (ČNS IFPI) | 47 |
| Dutch Albums (Album Top 100) | 53 |
| French Albums (SNEP) | 42 |
| German Albums (Offizielle Top 100) | 39 |
| Greek Albums (IFPI) | 65 |
| Irish Independent Albums (IRMA) | 13 |
| Italian Albums (FIMI) | 88 |
| New Zealand Heatseeker Albums (RMNZ) | 1 |
| Portuguese Albums (AFP) | 21 |
| Scottish Albums (Official Charts) | 24 |
| Swiss Albums (Schweizer Hitparade) | 21 |
| UK Albums (Official Charts) | 27 |
| UK Independent Albums (Official Charts) | 2 |
| US Heatseekers Albums (Billboard) | 8 |
| US Independent Albums (Billboard) | 14 |
| US Top Album Sales (Billboard) | 77 |
| US Top Current Album Sales (Billboard) | 64 |

2022–2025 weekly chart performance for Cigarettes After Sex
| Chart (2022–2025) | Peak position |
|---|---|
| Australian Albums (ARIA) | 81 |
| Canadian Albums (Billboard) | 81 |
| Finnish Albums (Suomen virallinen lista) | 31 |
| German Albums (Offizielle Top 100) | 38 |
| Icelandic Albums (Tónlistinn) | 23 |
| Lithuanian Albums (AGATA) | 5 |
| Norwegian Albums (VG-lista) | 28 |
| Polish Albums (ZPAV) | 25 |
| Swedish Albums (Sverigetopplistan) | 31 |
| US Billboard 200 | 112 |
| US Top Rock & Alternative Albums (Billboard) | 24 |

=== Year-end charts ===
2017 year-end chart performance for Cigarettes After Sex
| Chart (2017) | Position |
|---|---|
| Belgian Albums (Ultratop Flanders) | 59 |
| Belgian Albums (Ultratop Wallonia) | 172 |

2018 year-end chart performance for Cigarettes After Sex
| Chart (2018) | Position |
|---|---|
| Belgian Albums (Ultratop Flanders) | 95 |

2019 year-end chart performance for Cigarettes After Sex
| Chart (2019) | Position |
|---|---|
| Belgian Albums (Ultratop Flanders) | 164 |

2022 year-end chart performance for Cigarettes After Sex
| Chart (2022) | Position |
|---|---|
| Belgian Albums (Ultratop Flanders) | 132 |
| Icelandic Albums (Tónlistinn) | 66 |
| Lithuanian Albums (AGATA) | 7 |

2023 year-end chart performance for Cigarettes After Sex
| Chart (2023) | Position |
|---|---|
| Belgian Albums (Ultratop Flanders) | 88 |
| Belgian Albums (Ultratop Wallonia) | 182 |
| Dutch Albums (Album Top 100) | 97 |
| Icelandic Albums (Tónlistinn) | 39 |
| Polish Albums (ZPAV) | 83 |
| Swedish Albums (Sverigetopplistan) | 90 |

2024 year-end chart performance for Cigarettes After Sex
| Chart (2024) | Position |
|---|---|
| Belgian Albums (Ultratop Flanders) | 39 |
| Belgian Albums (Ultratop Wallonia) | 88 |
| Dutch Albums (Album Top 100) | 53 |
| Icelandic Albums (Tónlistinn) | 30 |
| Polish Albums (ZPAV) | 67 |
| Swedish Albums (Sverigetopplistan) | 55 |

2025 year-end chart performance for Cigarettes After Sex
| Chart (2025) | Position |
|---|---|
| Belgian Albums (Ultratop Flanders) | 44 |
| Belgian Albums (Ultratop Wallonia) | 81 |
| Dutch Albums (Album Top 100) | 57 |
| Icelandic Albums (Tónlistinn) | 31 |
| Polish Albums (ZPAV) | 93 |
| Swedish Albums (Sverigetopplistan) | 47 |
| Swiss Albums (Schweizer Hitparade) | 95 |

== Certifications ==
Certifications for Cigarettes After Sex
| Region | Certification | Certified units/sales |
|---|---|---|
| Denmark (IFPI Danmark) | Platinum | 20,000^{‡} |
| France (SNEP) | 2× Platinum | 200,000^{‡} |
| Italy (FIMI) | Platinum | 50,000^{‡} |
| New Zealand (RMNZ) | Platinum | 15,000^{‡} |
| Poland (ZPAV) | 2× Platinum | 40,000^{‡} |
| United Kingdom (BPI) | Gold | 100,000^{‡} |
| United States (RIAA) | Platinum | 1,000,000^{‡} |
^{‡} Sales+streaming figures based on certification alone.
