= Slow dance =

Partner dance performed to slow-beat music

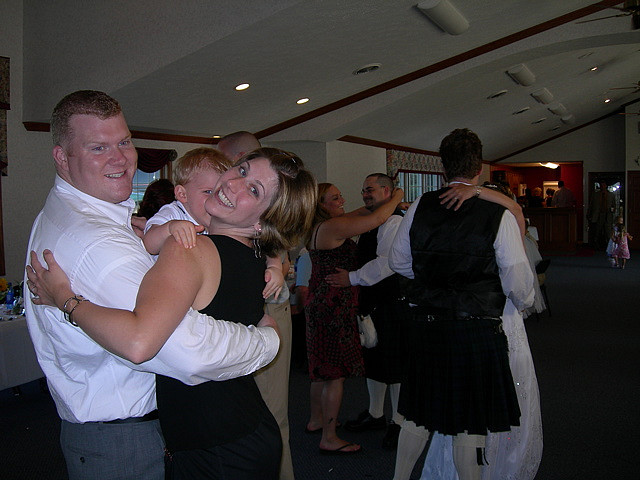
People slow dancing at a wedding (United States, 2006)

A slow dance is a type of partner dance in which a couple dance slowly, swaying to the music. This is usually done to very slow-beat songs, namely sentimental ballads.

Slow dancing can refer to any slow couple dance (such as certain ballroom dances), but is often associated with a particular, simple dance style performed by middle school, high school, and college students.

== Technique ==
When two partners dance together, the male dancer typically holds his hands against the sides of the female dancer's hips, buttocks, or waist while the female dancer drapes her hands on the male dancer’s shoulders, upper back, or around their neck. The couple then sways back and forth with the music. Foot movement is minimal, but the pair may use their feet to turn on the spot slowly. Because the dance requires little physical concentration, participants often talk to each other while dancing. Some couples who have a close relationship may dance very closely together, in a "hug-and-sway" fashion.
