= Partisan Records =

American independent record label

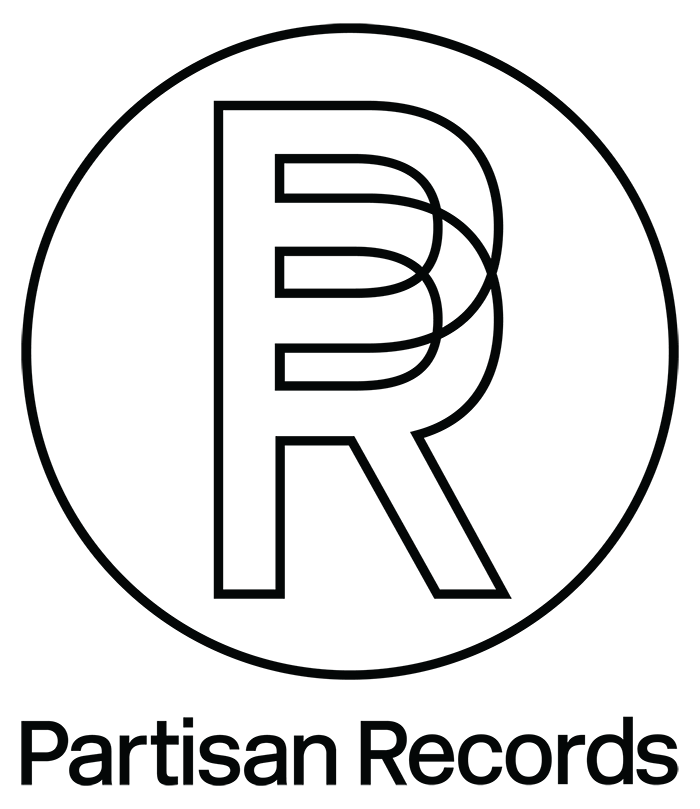
- Founded: 2007; 19 years ago
- Founder: Tim Putnam; Ian Wheeler
- Status: Active
- Genre: Various, with a focus on indie rock and post-punk
- Country of origin: United States
- Location: Brooklyn, New York, US (HQ); London, UK
- Official website: www.partisanrecords.com

Partisan Records is an American independent record label. The company was co-founded in 2007 by Tim Putnam and Ian Wheeler in Brooklyn, New York.

== History ==
Partisan Records was founded in Brooklyn, New York, in 2007 by Tim Putnam and Ian Wheeler. At the time, Putnam was working at the independent label Knitting Factory Records and started Partisan as a "passion project" from his apartment.

An early signing was the Providence-based rock band Deer Tick. The critical success of their albums helped establish the label's credibility. In 2008, Partisan entered into a formal partnership with Knitting Factory Entertainment, which also involved managing the catalog of Nigerian musician Fela Kuti.

The label continued to build its roster, signing artists like The Dismemberment Plan for their reunion album Uncanney Valley in 2013. A turning point for Partisan's international profile came with the signing of Cigarettes After Sex.

Partisan signed Dublin post-punk band Fontaines D.C. in 2018 and Bristol band Idles in 2019. Both bands achieved critical and commercial success under the label. Idles' albums Ultra Mono (2020) and Tangk (2024), along with Fontaines D.C.'s Skinty Fia (2022), all debuted at #1 on the UK Albums Chart.

In 2024, they signed a global distribution deal with Virgin Music Group, which means they would distribute Partisan releases globally. This resulted in their distribution switching from Redeye Distribution to Universal Music.

== section1 and Select Discs ==
In 2021, Partisan launched a joint venture label, section1, in partnership with Brontë Jane of Third Side Music, and Chris Robbins. As of 2026, bands released by section1 include Blonde Redhead, King Princess, Hildegard, The Healing Power of Horses, Fazerdaze, Eterna, and RIP Magic.

In 2026, Partisan launched another imprint, Select Discs, which will release more club-focused releases. So far, the imprint has released music by altrice, Jeshi, DJ GTi, Anish Kumar, and Sofia Kourtesis.

== Awards and accolades ==
Partisan Records has won Label of the Year at the Libera Awards (2019, 2023) and the Rolling Stone UK Awards (2023).

In 2023, London-based jazz group Ezra Collective won the Mercury Prize for their album Where I'm Meant to Be. Several artists have received multiple Grammy nominations, including Fontaines D.C. and Idles.

Idles have won multiple Ivor Novello Awards and NME Awards. Ezra Collective won a Brit Award for Group of the Year.

== Artists ==
As of August 2026, the artist classifications below follow the label's official roster.

=== Current ===
- Beth Orton
- Blondshell
- Cameron Winter
- Cigarettes After Sex
- Cymande
- DJ Rashad
- Ezra Collective
- Fela Kuti
- Femi Kuti
- Geese
- Grian Chatten
- Idles
- Interpol
- Julia Cumming
- Just Mustard
- Laura Marling
- Lip Critic
- Maple Glider
- NoSo
- Paul Banks
- PJ Harvey
- Sun's Signature
- TTSSFU
- Westerman
- Witch Post

=== Alumni ===
- Aaron Freeman
- Ages and Ages
- The Amazing
- Angélica Garcia
- Aoife Nessa Frances
- The Black Angels
- Bobby
- Bombino
- Chubby and the Gang
- Craig Finn
- Deer Tick
- Dilly Dally
- The Dismemberment Plan
- DMA's
- Dolorean
- Eagulls
- Emel Mathlouthi
- Emily Wells
- Field Report
- Flock of Dimes
- Fontaines D.C.
- Heartless Bastards
- Holy Sons
- JBM
- John Grant
- Lumerians
- Lump
- Mádé Kuti
- Mercury Rev
- Middle Brother
- Mountain Man
- Paleo
- Phox
- Pottery
- Pure Bathing Culture
- Skinny Pelembe
- The Standard
- Sylvan Esso
- Tender
- Torres
- Treetop Flyers
- Ultraísta
- Warm Ghost
- WITCH
- The Wytches

== Notable releases ==
Year	Artist	Album	Notes
2014	Sylvan Esso	Sylvan Esso	Certified Gold in the US.
2017	Cigarettes After Sex	Cigarettes After Sex	Certified Platinum in the UK.
2018	Idles	Joy as an Act of Resistance	Reached #5 on the UK Albums Chart and was shortlisted for the 2019 Mercury Prize.
2019	Fontaines D.C.	Dogrel	Shortlisted for the 2019 Mercury Prize.
2020	Laura Marling	Song for Our Daughter	Nominated for the Mercury Prize and the Grammy Award for Best Folk Album.
2020	Idles	Ultra Mono	Reached #1 on the UK Albums Chart.
2022	Fontaines D.C.	Skinty Fia	Reached #1 on the UK and Irish Albums Charts.
2022	Ezra Collective	Where I'm Meant to Be	Won the 2023 Mercury Prize.
2023	PJ Harvey	I Inside the Old Year Dying	Nominated for the Grammy Award for Best Alternative Music Album.
2023	WITCH	Zango	The band's first album in nearly 40 years, it received critical acclaim.
2024	Idles	Tangk	Reached #1 on the UK Albums Chart.
2024	Cameron Winter	Heavy Metal	The debut solo album from the Geese frontman.
2025	Geese	Getting Killed	Won Best International Group at the BRITs
