= Knitting Factory Records =

American record label

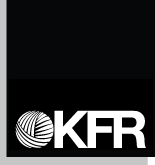
- Founded: 1998
- Genre: Alternative rock Folk; Experimental; Afrobeat
- Country of origin: U.S.
- Official website: store.partisanrecords.com/knitting-factory-records

Knitting Factory Records is an independent American music label that is notable for promoting a variety of artists, including the music of deceased Nigerian political activist Fela Kuti. The label promotes a variety of music artists including Ages and Ages, Ash Black Bufflo, Cuong Vu, Graham Haynes, Femi Kuti, Gary Lucas, Lumerians, Thomas Chapin, Patrolled By Radar, Joe Morris, Rachid Taha, Seun Kuti, and Shilpa Ray and her Happy Hookers.

The label was begun in 1998 as a spinoff of the music venues called Knitting Factory and signed artist Thomas Chapin as the first artist, according to the New York Times. Since then, it has promoted a variety of independent artists and groups such as Hasidic New Wave, which featured Jewish musicians combining with Senegalese Muslim musicians in 2002. In 2008, while working as the Night Manager for The Knitting Factory venue at their Leonard St. location in Manhattan, Tim Putnam was approached by Knitting Factory Entertainment CEO Morgan Margolis to form a strategic partnership with Partisan Records. Together they've reissued the Fela Kuti catalogue and revived the Knitting Factory Records label.

With the Partisan Records team behind it, KFR has released six albums from Nigerian musician and activist Fela Kuti in January 2011. The label released the entire catalogue of Kuti's Universal-controlled music in North America from 2009 to 2011. The late Fela Kuti has fascinated millions, according to the Boston Globe. A decade after his death in 1997, Kuti's music is becoming mainstream, and a Broadway musical titled Fela! was created, which chronicled his life as a political agitator with more than two dozen wives through use of his music. Kuti was jailed over 200 times, and his mother was murdered after being thrown out of a window. His sons Seun Kuti and Femi Kuti have become prominent musicians as well and are promoted by Knitting Factory Records. In addition to releasing music by Fela Kuti and his sons, the label also released the original Broadway cast recording of the musical adaptation Fela! Knitting Factory reached a licensing deal with Universal Music to reissue Fela Kuti's music in the United States during 2010.

== Artists ==
A list of past and current artists includes the following:

- Ages and Ages
- Oren Bloedow
- Ash Black Bufflo
- Thomas Chapin
- Graham Haynes
- Fela Kuti
- Femi Kuti
- Seun Kuti
- Gary Lucas
- Lumerians
- Joe Morris
- Patrolled By Radar
- Shilpa Ray and Her Happy Hookers
- Rachid Taha
- Cuong Vu
- Bill Ware

== See also ==
- Instinct Records
