= Holy Sons =

Musical project by Emil Amos

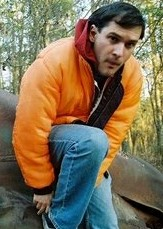
- Amos c. 2011

Background information
- Origin: Portland, Oregon, U.S.
- Genres: Avant-garde
- Label: Partisan Records
- Members: Emil Amos

Holy Sons is a one-man solo band built around American songwriter and drummer Emil Amos. Amos is notable for releasing "genre-bending" albums, according to LA Weekly music reviewer Chris Martins, and for being a prolific songwriter; one account in Spike Magazine suggests he has written over a thousand songs. Amos is also a multi-instrumentalist for groups such as Grails and Om and Lilacs & Champagne. Amos was born of the lo-fi home recording movement of the '80s and early '90s.

Amos described the mission of his music as "facing your personal reality". Amos said in an interview that, beginning at age 16, he used drugs every single day and did not let up for years. A music critic for The Guardian described him as a prolific songwriter and as having a "great voice". Reviewer Rob Cullivan of the Portland Tribune described Holy Sons' album Survivalist Tales to be an "ode to the dime novels in the early 1900s that peddled the stories of wilderness explorers," and described the music as "sonic wanderings" with "strange song structures". A review in the Portland Mercury described his music as "dark, languid psychedelia" and commented how Amos has "habitually been kept underground" with few live performances up until the last few years. His vocals have been compared to Neil Young but change personalities quite often. Willamette Week described the album Decline of the West as "a varied, meticulously constructed piece of avant-folk that stands alone by its own merits."

== Discography ==
=== Albums ===
Year	Album details
2000	The Lost Decade: Released: January 2000; Label: Pamlico Sound
2002	Staying True to the Ascetic Roots: Released: May 2002; Label: Pamlico Sound
2002	Enter the Uninhabitable: Released: October 2002; Label: Red 76
2003	I Want to Live a Peaceful Life: Released: July 2003; Label: FILMguerrero
2005	Decline of the West: Released: December 2005; Label: Partisan Records
2009	Drifter's Sympathy: Released: April 2009; Label: Important Records
2009	Criminal's Return: Released: October 2009; Label: Important Records
2010	Survivalist Tales!: Released: October 2010; Label: Partisan Records
2013	My Only Warm Coals: Released: April 2013; Label: Important Records
2014	Lost Decade II: Released: April 2014; Label: Chrome Peeler
2014	The Fact Facer: Released: September 2014; Label: Thrill Jockey
2015	Fall of Man: Released: August 2015; Label: Thrill Jockey
2015	Decline of the West Vol. I & II (deluxe reissue): Released: December 2015; Label: Partisan Records
2016	In the Garden: Released: October 2016; Label: Partisan Records
2018	Lost Decade III: Released: April 2018; Label: XRAY Records
2020	Raw and Disfigured: Released: OCT 2020; Label: Thrill Jockey
2025	Puritan Themes: Released: OCT 2025; Label: Thrill Jockey
