= Miss Ann (album) =

Studio album by Wayne Horvitz and Pigpen
- Released: 1995
- Recorded: November 1993
- Genre: Jazz
- Length: 41:40
- Label: Tim/Kerr
- Producer: Wayne Horvitz

Wayne Horvitz chronology
V as in Victim (1993)	Miss Ann (1995)	Live in Poland (1994)

Miss Ann is an album by American keyboardist and composer Wayne Horvitz' band Pigpen recorded in 1993 and released on the independent Tim/Kerr label on October 17, 1995.

== Reception ==
The Allmusic review awarded the album 4 stars.

Professional ratings
Review scores
Source	Rating
Allmusic	4/5 stars

== Track listing ==
All compositions by Wayne Horvitz except as indicated

1. "Miss Ann" (Eric Dolphy) - 4:44
2. "The Very Beginning" - 4:20
3. "Hard Regulator" - 3:02
4. "Stupid" - 5:41
5. "Ballad" - 4:18
6. "Grind" - 4:30
7. "Triggerfingers" (John Zorn) - 3:44
8. "One Last Blues" - 6:55
9. "Caligari" - 4:26

- Recorded at Sound Impressions in Portland, Oregon in November 1993

== Personnel ==
- Wayne Horvitz - keyboards
- Briggan Krauss - alto saxophone
- Fred Chalenor - electric bass
- Mike Stone - drums
- The Billy Tipton Memorial Saxophone Quartet (tracks 4 & 9): Marjorie de Muynck, Amy Denio, Jessica Lurie, Barbara Marino.
