= Daylight (disambiguation) =

Daylight is the combination of all direct and indirect sunlight outdoors during the daytime, which includes:

- Sunlight, the total spectrum of the electromagnetic radiation given off by the Sun
- Diffuse sky radiation, solar radiation reaching the Earth's surface after having been scattered by molecules or suspensoids in the atmosphere

Daylight may also refer to:

== Film ==
- Daylight (1914 film), a silent film featuring Jean Durrell
- Daylight (1996 film), an American action film starring Sylvester Stallone
- Daylight (2013 film), a Dutch drama film

== Music ==
- Daylight Records, a defunct American record label
- The Daylights, an American alternative rock band 2004–2013
- Superheaven, formerly Daylight, an American alternative rock band

=== Albums ===
- Daylight (Duncan Sheik album), 2002
- Daylight (Grace Potter album), 2019
- Daylight (Jimmy Ibbotson album) or the title song, 2005
- Daylight (Needtobreathe album), 2006
- Daylight (Pigpen album) or the title song, 1997
- Daylight (The Selecter album) or the title song, 2017
- Daylight (EP), by Aesop Rock, or the title song, 2002
- Daylight, an EP by Parmalee, 2002

=== Songs ===
- "Daylight" (Birds of Tokyo song), 2022
- "Daylight" (Bobby Womack song), 1976; covered by Kelly Rowland, 2008
- "Daylight" (David Kushner song), 2023
- "Daylight" (Drake song), 2023
- "Daylight" (Jimmy Barnes song), 1985
- "Daylight" (Maroon 5 song), 2012
- "Daylight" (Matt and Kim song), 2008
- "Daylight" (Taylor Swift song), 2019
- "I Seek" / "Daylight", by Arashi, 2016
- "Daylight" (Shinedown song), 2022
- "Daylight", by 5 Seconds of Summer from Amnesia EP, 2014
- "Daylight", by Asia from Alpha, 1983
- "Daylight", by Blue October from I Hope You're Happy, 2018
- "Daylight", by Coldplay from A Rush of Blood to the Head, 2002
- "Daylight", by Delerium from Poem, 2000
- "Daylight", by Disciples, 2016
- "Daylight", by Failure from Fantastic Planet, 1996
- "Daylight", by Harry Styles from Harry's House, 2022
- "Daylight", by Joji from Nectar, 2020
- "Daylight", by the JudyBats from Native Son, 1991
- "Daylight", by Oh Land from Earth Sick, 2014
- "Daylight", by Poco from Inamorata
- "Daylight", by Yelawolf from Trial by Fire, 2017

== Other media ==
- Daylight, a 1953 poetry anthology by Czesław Miłosz
- Daylight (magazine), an American documentary photography magazine
- Daylight (video game), 2014 survival horror game for the PS4 and PC

== People with the surname ==
- Matt Daylight (born 1974), British rugby league footballer
- Tegan Bennett Daylight (born 1969), Australian author

== Places in the United States ==
- Daylight, Indiana
- Daylight, Tennessee

== Rail transport ==
- Daylight (locomotive), Southern Pacific 4449, a steam locomotive
- Daylight Limited, a New Zealand express passenger train 1925–1963
- Coast Daylight, originally Daylight Limited, a passenger train in California, US, 1922–1974
- Intercapital Daylight, a passenger train in Australia 1956–1991

== See also ==
- Daylight Building (disambiguation)
- Daylight saving time
- Daylighting (disambiguation)
- Living daylights (disambiguation)
