= Living daylights =

Living Daylights, Living Daylight, or The Living Daylights may refer to:

- The living daylights, an archaic idiom referring to a person's vital senses
- The Living Daylights, 1987 James Bond film

== Music ==
- Living Daylights (jazz band), an American jazz trio
- Living Daylights, an Australian pop duo including Boyd Wilson
- Living Daylight, a 1987 EP by Hunters & Collectors
- The Living Daylights (soundtrack), a soundtrack album from the 1987 film
  - "The Living Daylights" (song), the theme song from the 1987 film, by A-ha
- "The Living Daylights", a song by DJ Fresh from the 2004 compilation Jungle Sound: The Bassline Strikes Back!
- "Living Daylights", a song by Kid Dynamite from the 2000 album Shorter, Faster, Louder
- "Living Daylights", a song by Two-Mix from the 1997 album Fantastix

== Arts and entertainment ==
- "The Living Daylights" (short story), a 1966 James Bond story by Ian Fleming in the book, Octopussy and The Living Daylights
- The Living Daylights (video game), a 1987 computer game based on the film

== See also ==
- Daylight (disambiguation)
