= Caveman Hughscore =

Studio album by Caveman Hughscore
- Released: 1995
- Studio: Sound Impressions (Portland, OR)
- Genre: Avant-prog, alternative rock
- Length: 57:05
- Label: Tim/Kerr

Caveman Shoestore chronology
Flux (1994)	Caveman Hughscore (1995)	Super Sale (2005)

Caveman Hughscore is a collaborative album by British bass guitarist Hugh Hopper and American trio Caveman Shoestore, released in 1995 by Tim/Kerr. Initially a one-time collaboration, the group became a regular endeavor under the name Hughscore.

== Reception ==
Professional ratings
Review scores
Source	Rating
AllMusic	3.5/5 stars

François Couture of allmusic gave a positive review, saying "The album sounds fresh and exciting, and despite a few flaws stands as one of Hopper's best collaborative records of the '90s." He concluded by calling the album "a thrilling first opus and offers a unique blend of jazz-rock, avant-prog, and American post-rock."

== Track listing ==
All tracks are written by Fred Chalenor, Elaine di Falco, Henry Franzoni and Hugh Hopper

No.	Title	Length
1.	"A Rabbit or a Lemon"	6:34
2.	"More Than Nothing"	7:00
3.	"Maja Raja"	1:15
4.	"Dee Dum"	4:34
5.	"Scooter Trash"	3:20
6.	"Dust My Mind"	3:12
7.	"Splinter Cat/Edorian"	2:32
8.	"A Small Seed"	5:33
9.	"Dedicated to You But You Weren't Listening"	2:33
10.	"Virtual Cats"	3:23
11.	"Oregon Transplant"	2:37
12.	"Freak Control"	2:21
13.	"Extra Lung"	3:42
14.	"Sasquatch Elevator"	1:13
15.	"Panic"	7:15

== Personnel ==
Adapted from the Caveman Hughscore liner notes.

Caveman Hughscore

- Fred Chalenor – bass guitar, electric piano and synthesizer (12)
- Elaine di Falco – keyboards
- Henry Franzoni – drums, voice (2, 5, 7, 10, 12, 14)
- Hugh Hopper – bass guitar, arrangement

Additional musicians

- Jen Harrison – French horn (1, 4, 5, 12, 13, 15)
- Michael Stirling – didgeridoo (15)

Production and design

- Steven Birch – design
- Nick Kellogg – recording, mixing
- Marc Trunz – photography

== Release history ==
Region	Date	Label	Format	Catalog
United States	1995	Tim/Kerr	CD	TK95CD093
