= Dinner at Eight =

Dinner at Eight may refer to:

== The play and its adaptations ==
- Dinner at Eight (play), a 1932 Broadway play written by George S. Kaufman and Edna Ferber
- Dinner at Eight (1933 film), a 1933 adaptation
- Dinner at Eight (1989 film), a made-for-television adaptation starring Lauren Bacall
- Dinner at Eight (opera) by William Bolcom

== Television ==
- Come Home Love: Dinner at 8, a 2016 Hong Kong sitcom
- "Dinner at Eight" (Falcon Crest), a 1989 episode
- "Dinner at Eight" (Frasier), a 1993 episode
- "Dinner at Eight", an episode of the Canadian sitcom The Newsroom

== Other ==
- "Dinner at Eight" (song), a song by Rufus Wainwright from his album Want One
- Dinner at Eight (album), a 1986 album by American keyboardist and composer Wayne Horvitz
- The Lady Is a Tramp song from Babes in Arms by Rodgers and Hart

== See also ==
- "Dinner at Eight-ish", an episode of the American sitcom Cheers
