= Daylight Building =

Daylight Building is the name of multiple buildings, including:

- Daylight Building (Knoxville, Tennessee)
- Daylight Building (Bellingham, Washington), listed on the National Register of Historic Places
