= Upper Egypt (album) =

Studio album by Wayne Horvitz and Zony Mash
- Released: 1999
- Recorded: July 1999
- Genre: Jazz
- Length: 57:23
- Label: Knitting Factory
- Producer: Wayne Horvitz

Wayne Horvitz chronology
Brand Spankin' New (1998)	Upper Egypt (1999)	American Bandstand (1999)

Upper Egypt is an album by American keyboardist and composer Wayne Horvitz's band Zony Mash recorded in 1999 and released on the independent Knitting Factory label.

== Reception ==
The Allmusic review by Sean Westergaard awarded the album 4 stars stating "Upper Egypt demonstrates what can happen when four talented individuals act with one mind: a great record".

Professional ratings
Review scores
Source	Rating
Allmusic	4/5 stars

== Track listing ==
All compositions by Wayne Horvitz except as indicated

1. "Upper Egypt" (Pharoah Sanders) -4:24
2. "Spice Rack" - 5:09
3. "The End of Time" - 5:20
4. "Big Shoe" (Bill Frisell) - 6:24
5. "FYI" - 4:22
6. "Forever" - 5:13
7. "Goes Round and Round" - 5:08
8. "I'm Sorry" (Timothy Young) - 5:51
9. "Snakebite" (Fred Chalenor, Wayne Horvitz, Andy Roth, Timothy Young) - 5:30
10. "Second Time Around" - 4:34
11. "The Blue Rose" - 5:28

- Recorded at Litho in Seattle, Washington in July 1999

== Personnel ==
- Wayne Horvitz - Hammond B-3 organ, Nord Lead, DX-7, Roland JD-800, Wurlitzer electric piano
- Timothy Young - guitar
- Keith Lowe - electric bass
- Andy Roth - drums
