= Master Cylinder (album) =

Studio album by Caveman Shoestore
- Released: 1992
- Recorded: April 18 – July 30, 1992
- Studio: Dogfish Studio (Portland, OR)
- Genre: Avant-prog, alternative rock
- Length: 47:38
- Label: Tim/Kerr
- Producer: Drew Canulette, Alessandro Monti

Caveman Shoestore chronology
Master Cylinder (1992)	Flux (1994)

Professional ratings
Review scores
Source	Rating
AllMusic	3.5/5 stars

Master Cylinder is the debut studio album of Caveman Shoestore, released in 1992 by Tim/Kerr.

== Track listing ==
All tracks are written by Fred Chalenor, Elaine di Falco and Henry Franzoni.

No.	Title	Length
1.	"Spill"	2:00
2.	"Pencil Sharpener"	3:22
3.	"Big Slow Melvin"	4:47
4.	"Flying"	3:42
5.	"Tractor Beam"	2:30
6.	"Secret Doorway in Nevada Leading to Monster Truck at the Bottom of the Ocean Where Elvis Lives"	3:40
7.	"An Angel Flew By"	2:43
8.	"Tractor Pulling a Clown"	3:54
9.	"Flattened Doggies"	3:25
10.	"I Just Might"	4:25
11.	"Lost Horizon"	3:20
12.	"When Rome Burns, Read the Sports Page"	1:36
13.	"Information Overload"	8:13

== Personnel ==
Adapted from the Master Cylinder liner notes.

Caveman Shoestore

- Fred Chalenor – bass guitar, banjo (9)
- Elaine di Falco – vocals, keyboards
- Henry Franzoni – drums, percussion, vocals (5, 13), marimba (11)

Production and design

- Drew Canulette – production
- John Golden – mastering
- Mike King – cover art, design
- Alessandro Monti – production

== Release history ==
Region	Date	Label	Format	Catalog
United States	1992	Tim/Kerr	CD	TK92CD024
