= Flux (Caveman Shoestore album) =

Studio album by Caveman Shoestore
- Released: 1994
- Recorded: Late 1993
- Studio: Sound Impressions (Portland, OR)
- Genre: Avant-prog, alternative rock
- Length: 46:16
- Label: Tim/Kerr
- Producer: Jimi Zhivago

Caveman Shoestore chronology
Master Cylinder (1992)	Flux (1994)	Caveman Hughscore (1995)

Professional ratings
Review scores
Source	Rating
AllMusic	3/5 stars

Flux is the second studio album by Caveman Shoestore, released in 1994 by Tim/Kerr.

== Track listing ==
All tracks are written by Fred Chalenor, Elaine di Falco, Henry Franzoni and Amy DeVargas.

No.	Title	Length
1.	"Knife Edge"	4:22
2.	"The Pond at Night"	0:50
3.	"Actualize"	4:41
4.	"Four Years Old"	3:11
5.	"Ticket to Obscurity"	2:26
6.	"Kurtain"	3:25
7.	"All This Air"	4:00
8.	"Lightning"	3:37
9.	"Henzyme"	3:18
10.	"Underneath the Water"	5:41
11.	"Underneath the City"	3:14
12.	"Cold"	7:31

== Personnel ==
Adapted from the Flux liner notes.

Caveman Shoestore

- Fred Chalenor – low-end bass guitar
- Amy DeVargas – lead vocals, high-end bass guitar
- Elaine di Falco – keyboards, backing vocals, cover art
- Henry Franzoni – drums

Production and design

- Steven Birch – design
- Nick Kellogg – engineering
- Duncan Stanbury – mastering
- Oliver Strauss – mastering
- Marc Trunz – photography
- Jimi Zhivago – production, mastering

== Release history ==
Region	Date	Label	Format	Catalog
United States	1994	Tim/Kerr	CD	TK92CD056
