= Live in Poland =

Live in Poland may refer to:

- Live in Poland (Emerson, Lake & Palmer album), 1997
- Live in Poland, a 1997 album by Praxis
- Live in Poland (Wayne Horvitz album), 1994
