= 4+1 Ensemble =

Studio album by Wayne Horvitz
- Released: 1998
- Recorded: 1996
- Genre: Jazz
- Length: 40:01
- Label: Intuition
- Producer: Wayne Horvitz

Wayne Horvitz chronology
Live in Poland (1994)	4+1 Ensemble (1998)	Monologue (1997)

4+1 Ensemble is an album by American keyboardist and composer Wayne Horvitz recorded in 1996 and released on the German Intuition label. The name of the group refers to its membership: four men playing standard musical instruments, plus an additional person processing their performances with various electronic effects in real-time.

== Reception ==
The Allmusic review awarded the album 4 stars.

Professional ratings
Review scores
Source	Rating
Allmusic	4/5 stars
The Penguin Guide to Jazz Recordings	4/4 stars

== Track listing ==
All tracks are written by Wayne Horvitz.

No.	Title	Length
1.	"Step Aside"	3:45
2.	"Up All Night"	3:57
3.	"Cotton Club"	4:05
4.	"First Light"	5:49
5.	"Trouble"	2:53
6.	"AFAP"	4:24
7.	"Exit Laughing"	3:04
8.	"Take Me Home"	4:55
9.	"Calder/Snake Eyes"	7:09

- Recorded at Bear Creek Studios in Seattle, Washington in 1996

== Personnel ==
- Wayne Horvitz - piano, keyboards
- Tucker Martine - audio processing
- Julian Priester - trombone
- Eyvind Kang - violin
- Reggie Watts - keyboards
