= The Tiptons Sax Quartet =

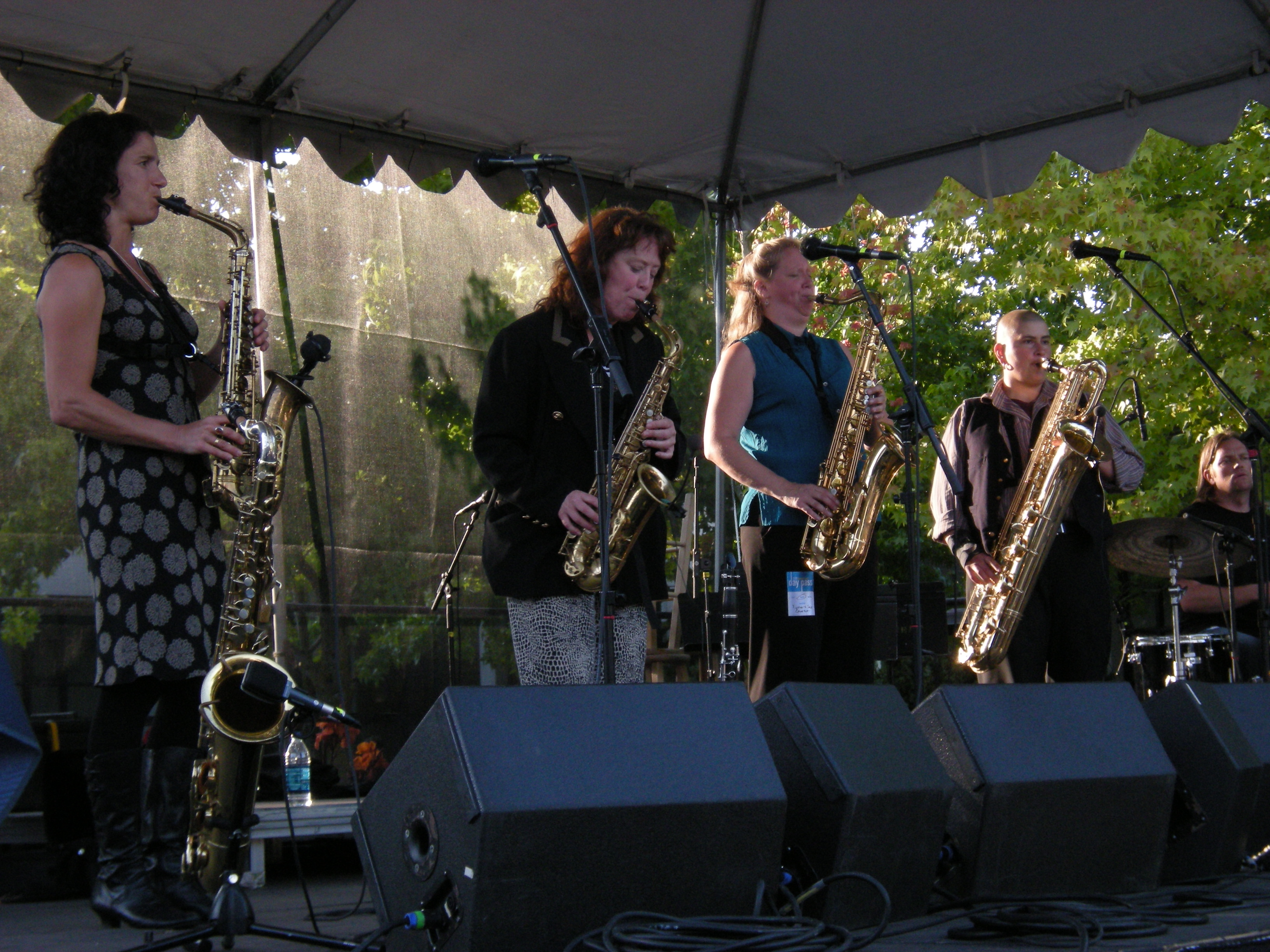
Tiptons

The Tiptons Sax Quartet, previously known as The Billy Tipton Memorial Saxophone Quartet, is a jazz saxophone quartet from Seattle, Washington. The ensemble consists of five members (the fifth member being the quartet's drummer and percussionist). Amy Denio (alto sax, clarinet, voice) is joined by co-leader Jessica Lurie (soprano/alto/tenor sax, voice), Sue Orfield (tenor sax, voice), Tina Richerson (baritone sax, voice) and Robert Kainar (drums, percussion) from Salzburg, Austria. The Tiptons' material ranges from micro-Big Band to Gospel, Bluegrass to Balkan, whimsical Chamber Jazz, and nocturnal Funk to Free Jazz Improvisation using saxophones, clarinet, their voices, drums, and inventive percussion to create a genre-busting ‘world soul’ sound.

The band takes its name in honor of Billy Tipton, a 20th-century professional saxophonist and transgender man who upon his death was revealed to have been assigned female at birth.

== Current members ==
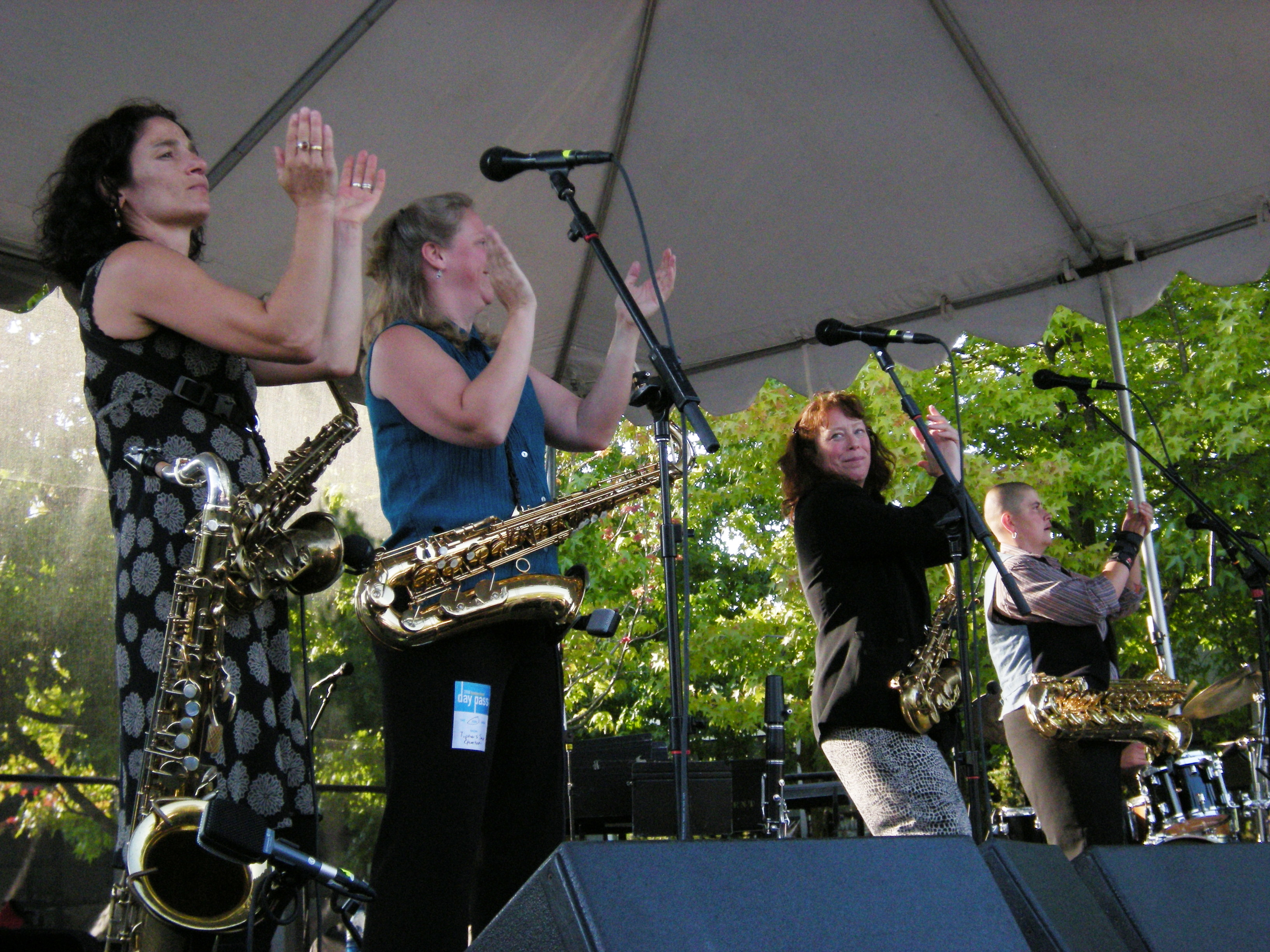
The Tiptons at Bumbershoot 2008. Left to right: Jessica Lurie, Amy Denio, Sue Orfield, Tina Richerson

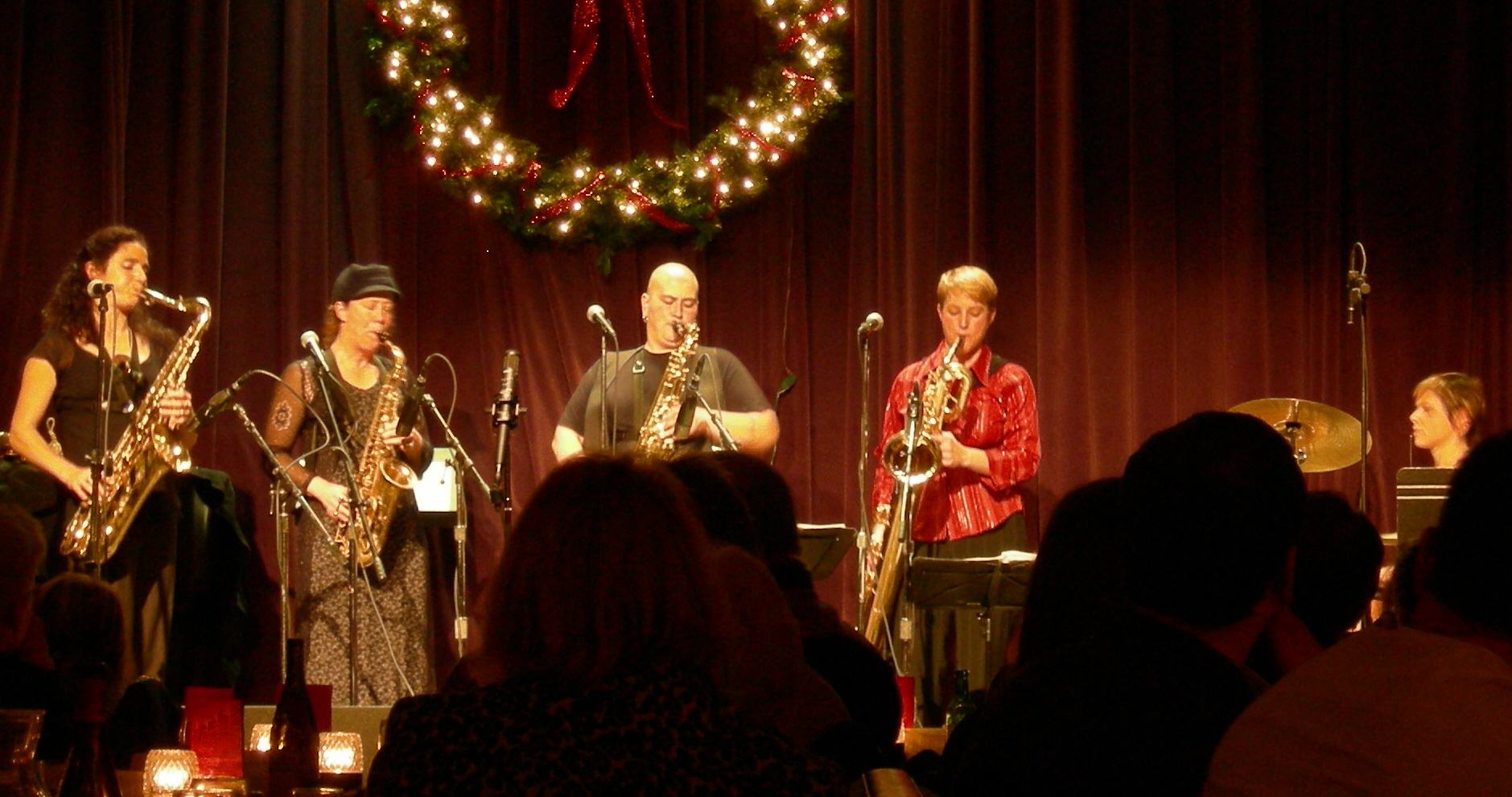
The Tiptons, December 2006. Left to right: Jessica Lurie, Amy Denio, Tina Richerson, Tobi Stone, Faith Stankevich

- Amy Denio – alto saxophone, voice
  Amy Denio is an original member of the Billy Tipton Memorial Saxophone Quartet, dating from the band's very first rehearsal at her house in the Fall of 1988. She composed for BTMSQ and organized tours and concerts until Spring, 1996. She took a hiatus from the band until 2002, when she and Jessica Lurie reformed the band, now named Tiptons Sax Quartet.
  She is a composer, improviser and recording engineer, and has run her own label, Spoot Music since 1986. She has received composition commissions from The Berkeley Symphony, The Relache Ensemble, Pat Graney Dance Company, David Dorfman Dance, New York Festival of Song, Italian National Radio and many other entities.
- Jessica Lurie – alto saxophone, tenor saxophone, voice
  Jessica Lurie is a multi-instrumentalist performer, composer, producer and teaching artist based in Brooklyn, NY and Seattle, WA. As well as co-leading the Tiptons since 1995, she leads the Jessica Lurie Ensemble, Living Daylights, Sofie Salonika, FreEthiopiques, and Slingshot with Seattle violist Heather Bentley. Jessica has released over 40 critically acclaimed albums as bandleader, lead composer or collaborator and has worked with international artists such as John Zorn, Devotchka, Taylor Mac, Nikki Glaspie, Nels Cline, Col. Bruce Hampton, Helen Gillet, Fred Frith, Bill Frisell, Shaking Ray Levis, Amy Denio, Mark Ribot, Percussia Ensemble, Frank London, Allison Miller, James Brandon Lewis and Great Small Works. She is a Sundance Composers’ Fellow and Downbeat “Rising Star for Alto Sax” nominee (2016, 2018, 2021). Recent productions Jessica has worked on include Taylor Mac's “The Hang; “ the Tiptons’ “Mujer o Bruja”; Mars Williams’ Devil's Whistle in New Orleans and her Shofar Meditations. www.jessicalurie.com
- Tina Richerson – baritone saxophone, voice
  Tina Richerson is based in Beaverton, Oregon, leads her own trio, plays with Return Flight Band, is the musical director of Never Too Late, Little Big Band and performs as a freelance musician.
- Sue Orfield – tenor saxophone, voice
  Sue Orfield also performs with The Sue Orfield Band and a variety of other groups.
- Robert Kainar – drums
  Robert Kainar is based in Salzburg Austria, and also performs with Ensemble 021, plays and writes for theater and records for many other bands.

== Former members ==
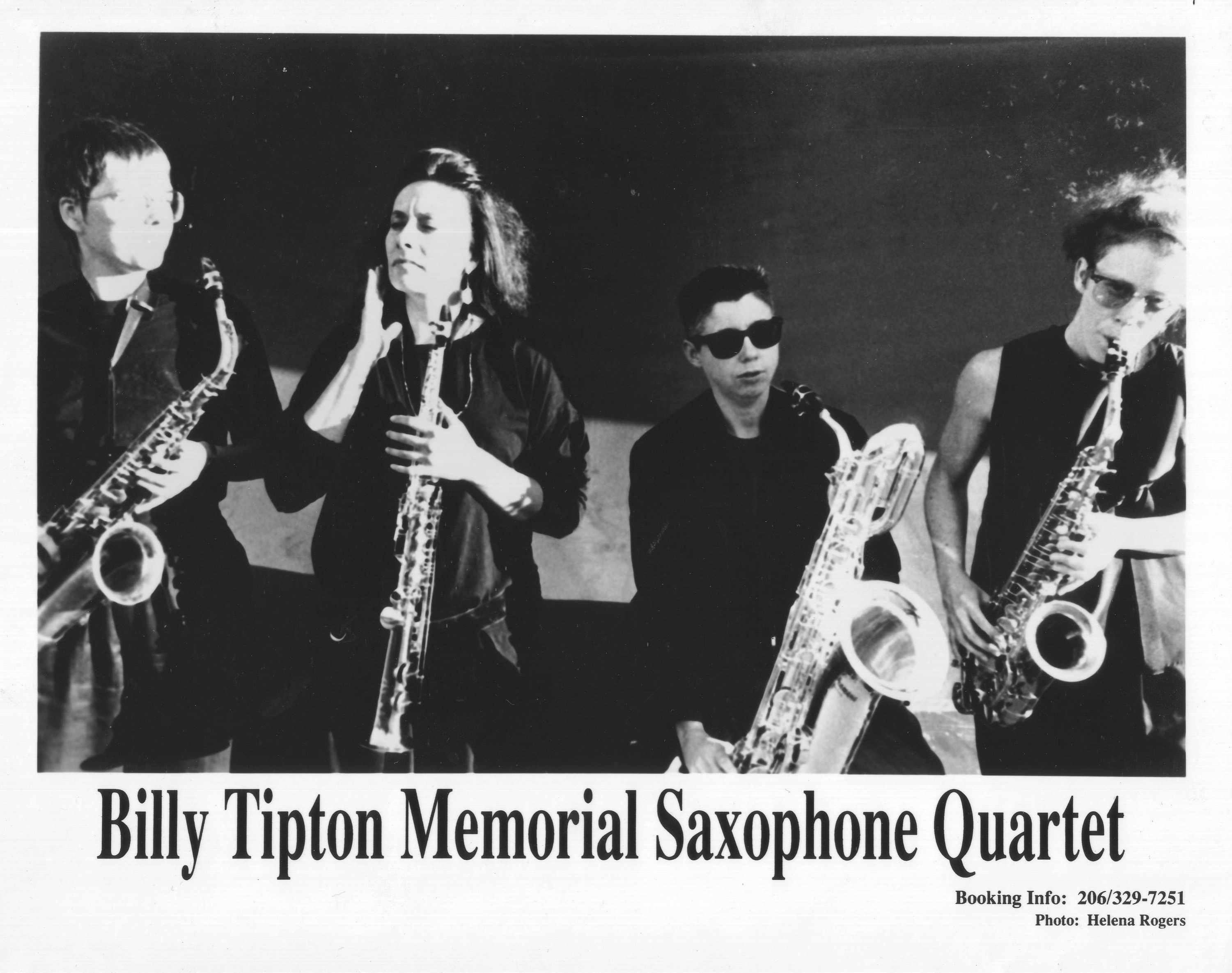
Billy Tipton Memorial Sax Quartet circa 1989

- Marjorie de Muynck – tenor saxophone, soprano saxophone

Marjorie de Muynck was an original member and co-founder of BTMSQ, playing and touring with BTMSQ from 1988-1995. Marjorie was a recording artist with Sounds True and Sound Universe. Her last CD was "Vibrational Healing Music" in which she composed music in her signature Earth key of Ohm, using field recorded crickets, cicadas, bees, birds, and bats. Her unusual recordings include altered frequencies of each. Her other CD's include "In the Key of Earth", and "There's No Place Like Ohm", Vols 1 & 2. She studied Oriental Medicine for over 25 years, and received her Master in Music from Boston University. She was a pioneer in the field of Sound Healing, developing the Ohm Therapeutics and the Acutonics Sound Healing systems and has written two books on the subject, including an instructional DVD. She resided near Santa Fe, New Mexico for roughly 10 years, where she was working on her Doctor in Oriental Medicine, continuing her passion for field recording animals, musical composition and performing with various groups. Marjorie died on January 25, 2011, at the age of 58. Obituary for Marjorie de Muynck

- John Otto – baritone saxophone

John Otto, at the time named Babs Helle, is the other co-founder of BTMSQ (along with Majorie de Muynck) and played in the group from 1988-1990, a busy period of 50 performances for the quickly emerging group that established its public identity. John coined the group's name, the Billy Tipton Memorial Saxophone Quartet, and was known for his rich baritone sound, snappy suits and ties, and for his witty commentary in his MC role at BTMSQ shows, thereby creating much of the public persona of the group. After leaving BTMSQ, John went on to work in the performance production field, including touring with Ani DiFranco. He has since worked professionally as a transgender activist, and currently works as a librarian and as an information specialist after obtaining his Master in Library and Information Science degree from the University of Washington.

- Faith Stankevich – drums

Faith joined the Tiptons in Spring, 2006, and toured with them until Fall, 2007. Faith also performs with Roger Staubach.

- Tobi Stone – baritone saxophone

Tobi joined the Tiptons in 2002, and retired from her full-time baritone position in spring of 2007. She still sits in and records with the Tiptons. Her other projects include Reptet.

- Elizabeth Pupo Walker – percussion

Elizabeth Pupo Walker played and toured with the Tiptons from 2003-2006. She retired when she gave birth to her daughter Maya. She has also played with Peter Buck in Tuatara.

- Barbara Marino – baritone saxophone

Barbara Marino played and toured with the Tiptons from 1992-2000. She has performed with Herbie Hancock, Melissa Etheridge, and Blakey St. John.

- Pam Barger – drums

Pam Barger was a member of the Austin band Two Nice Girls and Seattle's Pretty Mary Sunshine (A&M Records). Nona Hendryx, Michael Blaire, and Craig Ross of MCA Records are also among the artists she has recorded with.

- Maya Johnson – soprano saxophone and tenor saxophone

Maya Johnson was a member of Bakra Steel Band.

- Annalise Zamula – alto saxophone

Annalise is based in San Francisco, California.

- Stacy Loebs – alto saxophone

An early member of the quartet and the first person to regularly fill the 2nd Alto Sax slot, Stacy played with BTMSQ from 1989 to 1991 (exact date of departure uncertain).

== Discography ==
- Saxhouse (January 13, 1994) Horn Hut Records, originally published by Knitting Factory Records in 1993.
- Women and Their Work (1994) Knitting Factory Records
- Make it Funky God (March 4, 1994) Horn Hut Records
- Box (February 29, 1996) Horn Hut Records
- Sunshine Bundtcake (March 1, 2000) Horn Hut Records
- Short Cuts (March 1, 2003) Zipa! / Spoot Music
- Tsunami (March 1, 2004) Zipa! / Spoot Music and NoMansLand, Germany
- Surrounded by Horns (April 1, 2004) Stockfisch Records, Germany
- Drive (October 1, 2005) Zipa! / Spoot Music
- Laws of Motion (September 1, 2008) Zipa! / Spoot Music
- Strange Flower (October 2010) Zipa! / Spoot Music
- Tiny Lower Case (2014) Zipa! / Spoot Music / Sowiesound
- We Are Happy to Meet Again with Michaelbeuern Benedictine Abbey Stiftschor (2016) Sowiesound
- Cookbook (2016) Sowiesound
- Wabi Sabi (2021) Zipa! / Spoot Music / Sowiesound

With Wayne Horvitz

- Miss Ann (Tim/Kerr, 1993)
