= Cold Spell =

Studio album by Wayne Horvitz and Zony Mash
- Released: 1997
- Recorded: 1997
- Genre: Jazz
- Length: 45:03
- Label: Knitting Factory
- Producer: Wayne Horvitz

Wayne Horvitz chronology
Daylight (1997)	Cold Spell (1997)	Downtown Lullaby (1998)

Cold Spell is an album by American keyboardist and composer Wayne Horvitz' band Zony Mash recorded in 1997 and released on the independent Knitting Factory label.

== Reception ==
The Allmusic review by Solar Marquardt awarded the album 3 stars stating "The recording has a mellow quality, perhaps even slightly muted, but overall it works by giving the album a smooth tonality. With remarkable musicianship and themes you just can't forget, this debut album established Zony Mash as a modern jazz force to be reckoned with".

Professional ratings
Review scores
Source	Rating
Allmusic	3/5 stars

== Track listing ==
All compositions by Wayne Horvitz except as indicated

1. "With the Space on Top" - 2:53
2. "Happens Like That" - 5:19
3. "Sex Fiend" (John Zorn) - 3:38
4. "Prudence RSVP" - 7:07
5. "Cold Spell" - 4:37
6. "Mel" (Fred Chalenor) - 3:12
7. "Let's Get Mashed" - 4:06
8. "Smiles" - 5:06
9. "The Gift" - 3:14
10. "Withdrawal Symptoms" (Timothy Young) - 2:33
11. "Daylight" - 3:18
  - Recorded at Flora Avenue Studios in 1997

== Personnel ==
- Wayne Horvitz - Hammond B-3 organ
- Timothy Young - guitar
- Fred Chalenor - electric bass
- Andy Roth - drums
