= Tone Dogs =

American avant-prog band

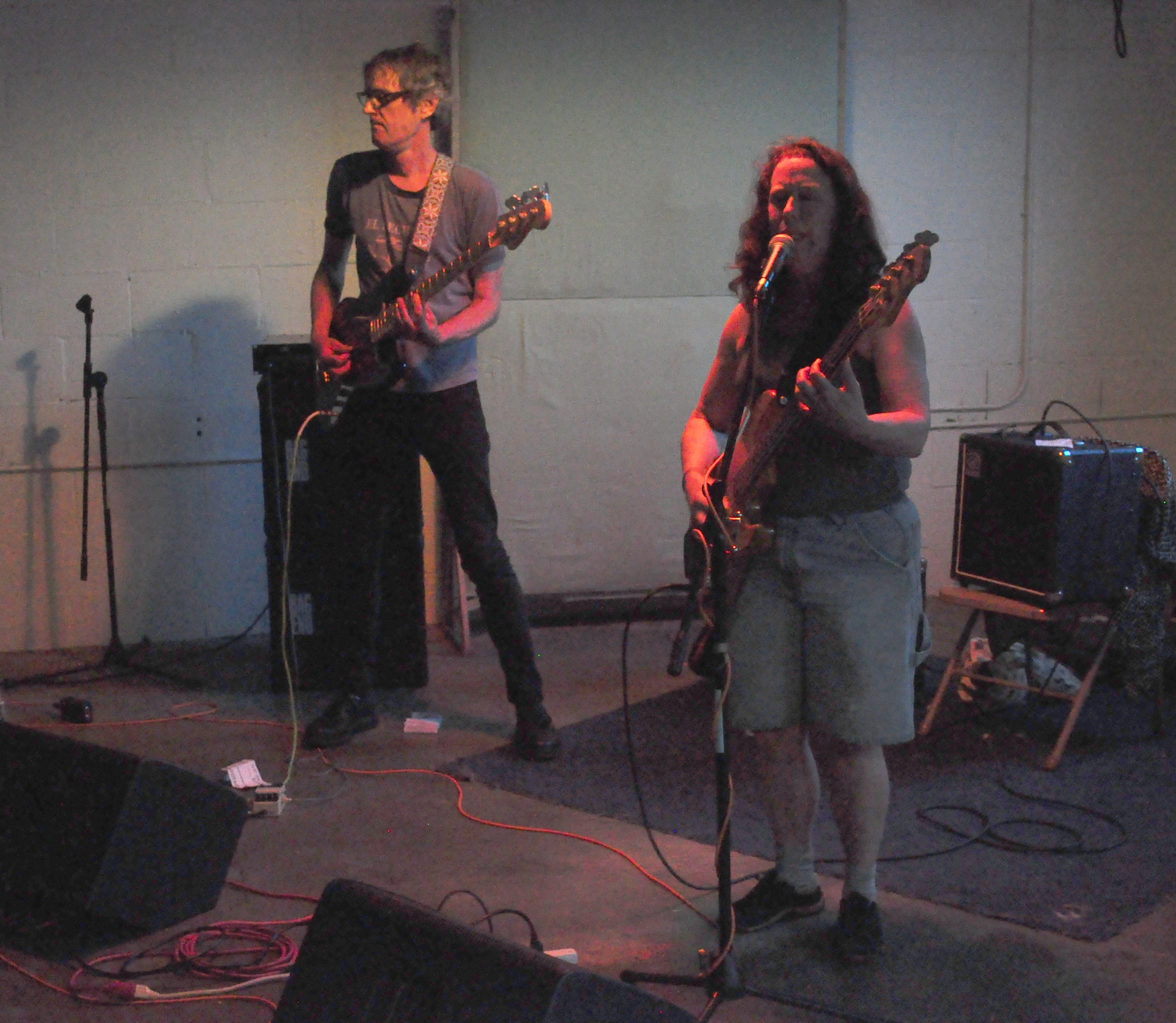

Background information
- Origin: Portland, Oregon, U.S.
- Genres: Rock in Opposition; art rock; avant-prog
- Years active: 1987–1991, 2013
- Labels: C/Z, Soleilmoon
- Past members: Matt Cameron; Fred Chalenor; Amy Denio; Will Dowd; Henry Franzoni; Courtney Von Drehle

Tone Dogs was an avant-prog group founded in 1987 by bassist Fred Chalenor and vocalist/saxophonist Amy Denio, who comprised the nucleus of the band. Drummer Matt Cameron, known for his work in the alternative rock group Soundgarden, was recruited to perform on the band's 1990 debut album Ankety Low Day. The band has also performed with Fred Frith of Henry Cow and Hans Reichel.

== History ==
Tone Dogs was formed in Portland, Oregon by Fred Chalenor and Amy Denio. Fred had just left his previous group Face Ditch and Amy had already recorded several solo works. The project began as studio experiment exclusively for the duo before they recruited Soundgarden drummer Matt Cameron. Cameron applied a swing to the odd time signatures he had developed with Soundgarden. After the Tone Dogs's recording sessions Cameron left the group to resume touring with Soundgarden, who had just been signed by A&M Records. The sessions surfaced on their debut album Ankety Low Day, which was released in 1990 and included performances by guitarists Fred Frith and Hans Reichel. Henry Franzoni, who had frequently collaborated with Chalenor since the 70s, briefly joined the band as Cameron's replacement before drumming duties were taken over by Will Dowd. The Early Middle Years compiled the sessions recorded with this line-up. During their European tour, the band decided to part ways in November 1991. Chalenor and Franzoni formed Caveman Shoestore that year in order to continue their musical ambitions.

On June 29, 2013, the original line-up of Chalenor and Denio performed a set of Tone Dogs songs at the first annual SeaProg festival in Seattle.

== Discography ==
Studio albums

- Ankety Low Day (C/Z, 1990)
- The Early Middle Years (Soleilmoon, 1991)

Live albums

- Tone Dogs live in Haarlem, NL (Spoot Music, 1988)
