= Brand Spankin' New =

Studio album by Wayne Horvitz and Zony Mash
- Released: 1998
- Recorded: 1998
- Genre: Jazz
- Length: 45:43
- Label: Knitting Factory
- Producer: Wayne Horvitz

Wayne Horvitz chronology
Downtown Lullaby (1998)	Brand Spankin' New (1998)	Upper Egypt (1999)

Brand Spankin' New is an album by American keyboardist and composer Wayne Horvitz's band Zony Mash recorded in 1998 and released on the independent Knitting Factory label.

== Reception ==
The Allmusic review by Solar Marquardt awarded the album 4 stars stating "The album features a confident, slightly more laid-back sound than their earlier material. The tracks are longer, averaging five to six minutes a piece, yet excellent improvisation and orchestration prevents them from becoming monotonous".

Professional ratings
Review scores
Source	Rating
Allmusic	4/5 stars

== Track listing ==
All compositions by Wayne Horvitz except as indicated

1. "Slide By" - 7:11
2. "Brand Spankin' New" - 3:58
3. "Chimacum After Hours" - 4:56
4. "Meet the Zony Mash" - 5:15
5. "Electric Sandworm" (Timothy Young) - 6:01
6. "Bad Traffic" - 4:30
7. "Cadillac Ranch" - 7:13
8. "Stompin' at the Cranium" - 6:39
  - Recorded at Chimacum After Hours in 1998

== Personnel ==
- Wayne Horvitz - Hammond B-3 organ, Nord Lead, DX-7, Moog Source, Wurlitzer electric piano
- Timothy Young - guitar
- Fred Chalenor - electric bass
- Andy Roth - drums
