= Knoxville TVA Employees Credit Union =

Credit union in Tennessee

- Type: Credit union
- Industry: Financial services
- Founded: March 12, 1934; 92 years ago
- Headquarters: Knoxville, Tennessee, United States
- Number of locations: 24 branches
- Area served: East Tennessee
- Products: Checking; savings; mortgages; consumer loans; investment; certificate accounts; online banking; mobile app
- Total assets: $5.0 billion USD (2025)
- Members: 301,737
- Website: tvacreditunion.com

Knoxville TVA Employees Credit Union (KTVAECU®) is an American, state-chartered credit union headquartered in Knoxville, Tennessee. It is regulated under the authority of the Tennessee Department of Financial Institutions (TDFI) and insured by the National Credit Union Administration.

The Credit Union was chartered in 1934 and serves more than 300,000 members across East Tennessee. As of 2025, KTVAECU reported assets of $5 billion, making it among the largest credit unions in the state. It is the second-largest credit union in East Tennessee. The Credit Union operates 24 branches across East Tennessee, along with one corporate office and a training and operations center in Knoxville, Tennessee.

== History ==
Knoxville TVA Employees Credit Union was established in 1934 to serve employees of the Tennessee Valley Authority (TVA). The Credit Union's first office was operated by Charles Hoffman from his desk on the third floor of the Sprankle Building in downtown Knoxville and was open one day each week. By the end of its first year, the Credit Union had approximately 300 members.

By 1950, the Credit Union moved its main office to the Daylight Building on Union Avenue in downtown Knoxville. The location included a secure vault used for member record storage. By the end of that year, the Credit Union reported approximately $1 million in assets.

During the 1970s, Knoxville TVA Employees Credit Union and other local credit unions entered into an agreement to serve credit union members through jointly operated branches. This was the first attempt by credit unions in Tennessee to explore the concept of shared branching. Knoxville TVA Employees Credit Union remained part of the shared branching arrangement until 1984.

The Credit Union expanded through a series of branch openings and mergers in subsequent decades. In 2018, KTVAECU merged with Mountain Lakes Credit Union expanding into two additional locations in the Tri-Cities region: one in Bristol, Tennessee and one in Piney Flats, Tennessee. In 2024, KTVAECU merged with the Kingston TVA Employees Credit Union, according to the National Credit Union Service Organization.

Lynn Summers was appointed President and Chief Executive Officer in 2023 following the retirement of the credit union’s previous leader, Glenn Siler, after nearly five decades of service.

In 2024, the Credit Union marked its 90th anniversary with a member appreciation initiative that included cash giveaways and community-focused events, as reported by the Citizen Tribune.

=== Branch Openings ===
- Main Office established in Sprankle Building: 1934
- Main Office moved to Daylight Building: 1950
- Main Office moved to 507 Market Street: 1972
- Open first shared branch with ORNL and K-25 Federal Credit Union (Enrichment Credit Union) in North Knoxville: 1976
- First free-standing branch in North Knoxville, Tennessee: 1984
- Branch opened in West Knoxville, Tennessee: 1984
- Branch opened in downtown Knoxville,Tennessee on Wall Avenue: 1989
- Drive-thru only branch opened at Lovell Heights in Knoxville, Tennessee: 1996
- Branch opened in Sevierville, Tennessee: 2001
- Branch opened in Morristown, Tennessee: 2002
- Branch opened in South Knoxville, Tennessee: 2005
- Branch opened in Lenoir City, Tennessee: 2009
- Branch opened in Morristown, Tennessee: 2016
- Branches incorporated in Bristol, Tennessee and Piney Flats, Tennessee: 2018
- Downtown Wall Avenue Branch moved to Market Square, Knoxville: 2020
- Branch opened in Powell, Tennessee: 2020
- Branch in Bristol, Tennessee moved to a new location: 2021
- Branch opened in the Northshore area of Knoxville, Tennessee: 2023
- Holston location moved to a new branch: 2025
- Groundbreaking for 25th branch on Strawberry Plains Pike in Knoxville: 2026

== Services and Technology ==
Knoxville TVA Employees Credit Union offers consumer deposit accounts, lending services, and member support through in-person, online, and mobile channels. In 2025, KTVAECU transitioned its core systems to Corelation Keystone and adopted Mahalo Banking for online and mobile banking services as part of its ongoing digital modernization effort.

In December 2025, KTVAECU began using the NCR Atleos Allpoint Deposit Network to expand member access to nationwide deposit-capable surcharge-free ATMs. According to NCR Atleos, this partnership made KTVAECU the first financial institution in Tennessee to offer Allpoint cash deposit access to cardholders.

KTVAECU also provides financial-education programs and community outreach initiatives designed to promote long-term saving habits among members.

== Community ==
KTVAECU participates in a variety of community programs and sponsorships throughout East Tennessee. Following the 2016 Great Smoky Mountains wildfires, Knoxville TVA Employees Credit Union served as the financial institution that helped distribute assistance checks from Dolly Parton’s My People Fund to affected families in Sevier County.

The Credit Union has also entered into sponsorship agreements with sports and community organizations in East Tennessee. KTVAECU became the naming sponsor for the TVA Credit Union Ballpark in Johnson City, Tennessee, home of the Appalachian League's Johnson City Doughboys, in 2016.

East Tennessee State University announced in 2021 that the stage in the D.P. Culp Student Center would be named the Knoxville TVA Employees Credit Union Stage following a pledge from the Credit Union. In 2026, East Tennessee State University announced a 10-year naming rights partnership with KTVAECU for the University’s Campus Recreation Field Complex. As part of the agreement, the complex was renamed the Knoxville TVA Employees Credit Union Sport Complex. The $500,000 sponsorship supports ETSU Campus Recreation facilities and programs for intramural sports, club sports, and outdoor recreation.

In 2024, KTVAECU and its members contributed more than $120,000 in donations and matching funds to assist with Hurricane Helene relief efforts across East Tennessee and Western North Carolina.

The Credit Union contributed $50,000 to Second Harvest Food Bank of East Tennessee in December 2025 to support regional hunger-relief efforts.

Knoxville TVA Employees Credit Union entered a community partnership with Morristown Landing Recreation and Events Center in Morristown, Tennessee. As part of the collaboration, an indoor track and court area at Morristown Landing was named the KTVAECU Sprint Zone, reflecting the Credit Union’s support for regional recreation and wellness initiatives. The partnership included the addition of a surcharge-free ATM in the Morristown Landing lobby. The arrangement was designed to expand community services and enhance access to fitness and event amenities for local residents. A ribbon-cutting ceremony for the KTVAECU Sprint Zone was held in January 2026 to kickoff the partnership.

KTVAECU also sponsors the Knoxville TVA Employees Credit Union First Base Concourse at Covenant Health Park, where the Knoxville Smokies host home games. As part of this sponsorship, KTVAECU supports community-oriented events at the ballpark, including fan promotions like Bobblehead Night.
