= Gazamba =

Electromechanical instrument

The gazamba is an electromechanical musical instrument, essentially a prepared electric piano.

It was built in the late 1970s by American composer and producer Chris Brown (b. 1953) from the shell of a Wurlitzer electric piano. While a standard electric piano produces sounds by amplifying the vibrations produced by plucking or striking a series of tuned metal spines, the gazamba produces its sounds via manipulation of assorted springs, nuts, bolts and other metallic objects, plus built-in electronic effects.

The gazamba was used in Brown's own compositions, prominently in Alternating Currents (1984), but also made its way onto a number of more mainstream rock, jazz, pop and folk recordings. Brown used the Gazamba on recording sessions that appeared on two records by keyboardist/composer Wayne Horvitz: Dinner at Eight and This New Generation (both released 1987).
