= Ankety Low Day =

Studio album by Tone Dogs
- Released: November 15, 1990
- Recorded: Dogfish Studios, Newberg, OR; Amy Denio's driveway, Seattle, WA
- Genre: Rock in Opposition
- Length: 39:23
- Label: C/Z

Tone Dogs chronology
Ankety Low Day (1990)	The Early Middle Years (1991)

Ankety Low Day is the debut studio album by Tone Dogs, released on November 15, 1990, by C/Z.

== Critical reception ==
Professional ratings
Review scores
Source	Rating
Allmusic	4/5 stars

In writing for Spin, critic Byron Coley compared the band favorably to Fish & Roses, Etron Fou Leloublan and Dos and said "Impossible to peg, elegantly crafted, their music seems soothingly familiar even at the moment your forebrain tells you that something very fucked up is happening."

== Track listing ==
No.	Title	Lyrics	Music	Length
1.	"No Cry"	David Stern	Amy Denio	6:39
2.	"Vexed at the Vogue"	Amy Denio	Fred Chalenor	1:41
3.	"Carry Me Down"		Amy Denio	2:01
4.	"The Wandering Guru"		Fred Chalenor	5:27
5.	"Secret Crush"		Amy Denio	4:03
6.	"Brave It"		Amy Denio	4:39
7.	"BS Jige/Hade Hade"		Fred Chalenor, Amy Denio	6:26
8.	"Fifth Grade, Brownie Wall"	Amy Denio	Fred Chalenor, Amy Denio, Zeena Parkins	3:19
9.	"Poly"		Matt Cameron, Fred Chalenor, Amy Denio	5:08

== Personnel ==
Adapted from the Ankety Low Day liner notes.

Tone Dogs

- Matt Cameron – drums, backing vocals
- Fred Chalenor – bass guitar, electric guitar, bowed guitar, keyboards, backing vocals
- Amy Denio – vocals, saxophone, electric guitar, bass guitar, drums, percussion

Additional musicians

- Bob Bain – guitar (4)
- Courtney Von Drehle – saxophone (4)
- Fred Frith – guitar, violin
- Hans Reichel – idiophone, guitar

Technical personnel

- Drew Canulette – engineering, mixing
- Lance Limbocker – mixing assistant
- Rhonda Pelikan – design
- Garry Transue – painting

== Release history ==
Region	Date	Label	Format	Catalog
United States	1990	C/Z	CD, LP	CZ016
