= Some Order, Long Understood =

Studio album by Wayne Horvitz, Butch Morris and William Parker
- Released: 1983
- Recorded: February 5, 1982
- Genre: Jazz
- Length: 42:28
- Label: Black Saint
- Producer: Giovanni Bonandrini

Wayne Horvitz chronology
Simple Facts (1981)	Some Order, Long Understood (1983)	Dinner at Eight (1985)

Some Order, Long Understood is an album by American keyboardist and composer Wayne Horvitz recorded in 1982 and released on the Italian Black Saint label.

== Reception ==
The AllMusic review awarded the album 3 stars.

Professional ratings
Review scores
Source	Rating
AllMusic	3/5 stars
The Penguin Guide to Jazz Recordings	3/4 stars

== Track listing ==
All compositions by Wayne Horvitz

1. "Psalm" - 21:08
2. "Some Order, Long Understood" - 21:20

- Recorded at Studio Henry in New York City on February 5, 1982

== Personnel ==
- Wayne Horvitz - piano
- Butch Morris - cornet
- William Parker - bass
