= The President (album) =

Studio album by Wayne Horvitz
- Released: 1987
- Recorded: 1987
- Genre: Jazz
- Length: 39:01
- Label: Dossier
- Producer: Wayne Horvitz

Wayne Horvitz chronology
Dinner at Eight (1985)	The President (1987)	Nine Below Zero (1986)

The President is an album by American keyboardist and composer Wayne Horvitz released in 1987 on the German Dossier label.

== Reception ==
Brian Olewnick awarded the album 4 stars on Allmusic and spoke favorably of the contributions by Bobby Previte, Elliott Sharp, and Bill Frisell.

Professional ratings
Review scores
Source	Rating
Allmusic	4/5 stars

== Track listing ==
All compositions by Wayne Horvitz except where indicated

1. "Goes Round and Round" – 4:13
2. "Please Take That Train From My Door" – 4:34
3. "From Town to Town" – 2:53
4. "One Bright Day" – 4:08
5. "Cadillac Ranch" – 4:08
6. "Gravity Falls" – 3:39
7. "The Bean" – 3:04
8. "The Donna Song" (Robin Holcomb) – 4:11
9. "Short of Breath" (Bobby Previte) – 4:45
10. "Early Risers" – 3:26

== Personnel ==
- Wayne Horvitz – keyboards, drum programming, harmonica
- Elliott Sharp – guitar
- Doug Wieselman – tenor saxophone, rhythm guitar
- Bill Frisell – guitar
- Bobby Previte – drums, drum programming, keyboards
- Dave Hofstra – electric bass, tuba

Additional Musicians:

- Robin Holcomb – keyboards (track 8)
- Jim Mussen – Emulator drums operation
- Nica – vocals (track 6)
- Jon Rose – unintentional cello (track 8)
