= Sweeter Than the Day =

Studio album by Wayne Horvitz
- Released: 2001
- Recorded: January 2001
- Genre: Jazz
- Length: 57:07
- Label: Songlines
- Producer: Wayne Horvitz

Wayne Horvitz chronology
From a Window (2000)	Sweeter Than the Day (2001)	Live in Seattle (2001)

Sweeter Than the Day is an album by American keyboardist and composer Wayne Horvitz, recorded in 2001 and released on the Canadian Songlines label.

== Reception ==
The AllMusic review by David R. Adler stated, "Above all, it's a fantastic-sounding record... The music is laid-back and a bit melancholy, with a layered folk-rock eclecticism ... both tuneful and highly angular in the same breath".

Professional ratings
Review scores
Source	Rating
AllMusic	4/5 stars
The Penguin Guide to Jazz Recordings	3/4 stars

== Track listing ==
All compositions by Wayne Horvitz except as indicated

1. "In One Time and Another" - 4:48
2. "Julian's Ballad" - 6:11
3. "LTMBBQ" - 6:18
4. "Sweeter Than the Day" - 5:05
5. "Irondbound" - 6:29
6. "Waltz from the Oven" - 5:47
7. "In the Lounge" - 5:30
8. "The Beautiful Number 3" (Timothy Young) - 5:44
9. "The Little Parade" - 6:52
10. "George's Solo" - 4:23

- Recorded at Studio Litho in Seattle, Washington, in January 2001

== Personnel ==
- Wayne Horvitz - piano, prepared piano
- Timothy Young - 6 and 12 string electric guitars
- Keith Lowe - bass
- Andy Roth - drums
