= Amy Denio =

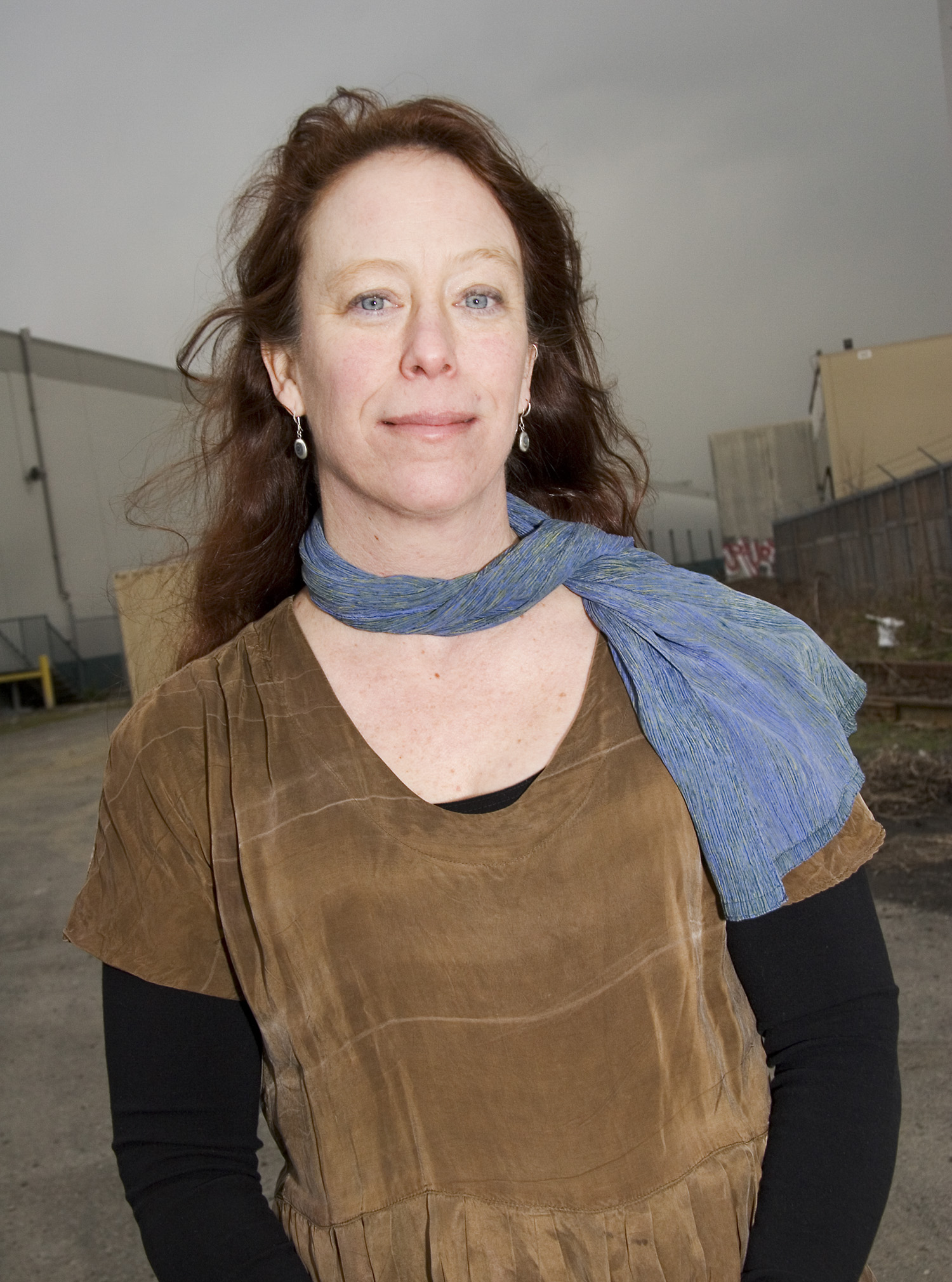

Background information
- Born: June 9, 1961 (age 65); Seattle, United States
- Genres: Avant-garde jazz; experimental rock; free improvisation
- Occupations: Musician, composer
- Instruments: Saxophone; accordion; vocals; Bass; Guitar; Piano
- Years active: 1986–present
- Labels: Spoot; No Man's Land
- Website: Amy Denio and Spoot Music

Amy Denio (born June 9, 1961) is a Seattle-based multi-instrumental composer of soundtracks for modern dance, film and theater, as well as a songwriter and music improviser. Her inspirations include world music, and is mainly known as a vocalist, accordionist and saxophone-player. Among her current musical involvements are The Tiptons Sax Quartet (formerly The Billy Tipton Memorial Saxophone Quartet) and Die Resonanz Stanonczi, a radical folk group based in Salzburg, Austria. She has also collaborated repeatedly with the Pat Graney Dance Company, David Dorfman Dance Company, Victoria Marks, and with many other choreographers.

Her first recording was No Bones released as a cassette on her record label Spoot Music in 1986. Her first LP was with the Entropics. She founded Tiptons in 1987, and also started Tone Dogs with bassist Fred Chalenor. Tone Dogs' first release Ankety Low Day was nominated to be nominated (sic) for a Grammy Award. She has performed and recorded with (among others) Matt Cameron, KMFDM, Curlew, Fred Frith, Pointless Orchestra, Francisco López, Danny Barnes, Pale Nudes, Blowhole, the Danubians, The Science Group, Chris Cutler, Guy Klucevsek, Pauline Oliveros, Relâche Ensemble, Hoppy Kamiyama, Derek Bailey, Chuck D, Dennis Rea, Bill Rieflin, Quintetto alla busara, Kultur Shock, and the Shaking Ray Levis.

== Biography ==
Amy Denio attended Brookside School and Kingswood School Cranbrook in Bloomfield Hills, Michigan from kindergarten through 12th grade, graduating in 1979. She became an autodidactic musician at age 12, quitting piano and starting guitar. She attended Colorado College, and also Hampshire College, graduating with a B.A. in Music Composition and Improvisation from Hampshire in 1984. She is self-taught on guitar, electric bass, drums, saxophone, clarinet, accordion, and various world instruments. She was sponsored by Jazz India to live in Bombay and study Thumri, Northern Indian vocal technique from Dhanashree Pandit-Rai in 1997.

Since 1988, she has performed at festivals in India, Japan, Hong Kong, Taiwan, Brazil, Argentina, North America, and throughout East and Western Europe.

From 1985–1990, Denio was Programming Office Coordinator at the Seattle headquarters of Yesco Foreground Music, which later merged with Muzak.

In 2007, she was commissioned by the Dream Community in Taipei, Taiwan to arrange, record and produce Taiwanese aboriginal and popular music with samba rhythms from Brazil. These arrangements were performed by junior high school students at the Camphor Tree School, who are from the Amis tribe of Taiwan.

She has taught workshops on composition, improvisation, and extended vocal techniques throughout the US and Europe.

She produced two albums for the Mediterranean band OU and collaborates with them live (http://oumusic.org/).

== Discography ==
- Amy Denio: No Bones (1986 Spoot Music)
- The Entropics: Spagga! (1987 PopLlama Records)
- Amy Denio: Never Too Old To Pop A Hole (1988 Spoot Music)
- Amy Denio: No Elevators (1988 Spoot Music)
- Tone Dogs: Live in Haarlem, NL (1988 Spoot Music)
- Amy Denio: Birthing Chair Blues (1991 Spoot Music)
- Tone Dogs: Ankety Low Day (1991 Spoot Music)
- Tone Dogs: The Early Middle Years (1992 Spoot Music)
- Amy Denio: Tongues (1993 Spoot Music)
- Curlew: A Beautiful Western Saddle (1993 Cuneiform Records)
- Billy Tipton Memorial Saxophone Quartet: Saxhouse (1993 Spoot & Zipa Music)
- The (EC) Nudes: Vanishing Point (1994 ReR)
- BTMSQ: make it funky god (1994 hornhut records)
- Blowhole: Gathering (1994 co-op release by Giardia, Fusetron & Carburetor record labels)
- Pale Nudes: Wise to the Heat (1995 RecDec)
- Fomoflo: Slug & Firearms (1996 God Mountain)
- Fomoflo: No.11 (1997 God Mountain)
- BTMSQ: Box (1996 New World Records)
- BTMSQ & Ne Zhdali: Pollo d'Oro (1997 No Man's Land)
- Danubians (1999 Cuneiform Records)
- Amy Denio: The Greatest Hits (1999 Unit Circle Rekkids)
- BTMSQ: Sunshine Bundtcake (2000 New World Records)
- Amy Denio: Tattoo [soundtrack] (2000 Unit Circle Rekkids)
- Amy Denio & Petunia: To Lie Tenderly (2000 Spoot Music)
- Amy Denio & Francisco López: Belle Confusion 00 (2001 Absolute/Anomalous)
- Amy Denio: TASOGARE (Twilight) (2001 Public Eyesore)
- Amy Denio and Quintetto alla Busara: Quintetto alla busara (2002 BBC-Spoot)
- Amy Denio: Chickenhawks Ought Not (2002 Spoot Music)
- George Cartwright: The Memphis Years (2002 Cuneiform Records)
- Amy Denio: "Halloween Howls" (2003 Jammin' Unit)
- Billies: Short Cuts (2003 Spoot & Zipa)
- Amy Denio & Martin Hayes: Vivian Girls (2004 Spoot Music)
- Pale Nudes: Soul Come Home (2004 RecDec)
- Tiptons: Tsunami (2004 No Man's Land/Spoot & Zipa)
- Tiptons: Surrounded by Horns (2004 Stockfisch)
- Tiptons: Drive (2005 Spoot & Zipa)
- Amy Denio & Francesco Calandrino: Venerdi' Santo (2006 Spoot Music)
- Derek Bailey/Amy Denio/Dennis Palmer: The Gospel Record (2005 Levi Recordings)
- Die Resonanz Stanonczi: Live At Jazzit (2006 No Man's Land)
- Die Resonanz Stanonczi: Edelbrand (2008 No Man's Land)
- The Tiptons Sax Quartet: Laws Of Motion (2008 Spoot & Zipa)
- Amy Denio: sub-Rosa (2008 Aphonia Recordings)
- The Tiptons Sax Quartet: Strange flower (2010 Spoot & Zipa)
- Amy Denio: Prodigal Light (2013 Spoot Music)
- Ou (music by Ersilia Prosperi): Pisces Crisis (2014 Spoot Music) - AS PRODUCER
- Ou (music by Ersilia Prosperi): Scrambled! (2015 Spoot Music) - AS PRODUCER
- Ed Mondo (Ersilia Prosperi & Diana Tejera): Oops! (2016) - AS PRODUCER
- The Big Embrace (2017, Spoot Music)
- Eureka (2019, Spoot Music)
- Pandemonium (2021, Spoot Music)
- Chapel Sessions (2022, Spoot Music)
- Varianti (2024, Spoot Music)
- Varieté (2025, Klanggalerie)
