= Bring Yr Camera =

Studio album by Wayne Horvitz
- Released: 1989
- Recorded: February 1988
- Genre: Jazz, blues
- Length: 48:26
- Label: Elektra/Musician
- Producer: Arthur Moorhead, Wayne Horvitz

Wayne Horvitz chronology
Nine Below Zero (1986)	Bring Yr Camera (1989)	Miracle Mile (1992)

Bring Yr Camera is an album by American keyboardist and composer Wayne Horvitz's band the President. It was recorded in 1988 and released on the Elektra/Musician label. Horvitz considered the President to be his attempt at a blues group.

== Critical reception ==
Professional ratings
Review scores
Source	Rating
AllMusic	3.5/5 stars

The New York Times wrote that "Horvitz's pieces dip into blues and slide-guitar rock a la Little Feat, along with mock-minimalist repetition, tinges of gamelan or Latin or Japanese music, and whatever else pops into mind."

The AllMusic review by Brian Olewnick stated: "Bring Yr Camera is an enjoyable disc and very much of its time, but one can't help but think of some degree of wasted potential".

== Track listing ==
All compositions by Wayne Horvitz

1. "Hearts Are Broken" - 5:07
2. "Philip" - 6:00
3. "Ride the Wide Streets" - 3:18
4. "Our Hands of Water" - 3:44
5. "Clear the Bridge" - 6:05
6. "Andre's Mood" - 5:20
7. "3 Crows" - 5:14
8. "A Bad Dream" - 9:59
9. "Wish the Children Would Come On Home" - 3:39
- Recorded at Power Station in New York City in February 1988

== Personnel ==
- Wayne Horvitz - keyboards, drum programming, harmonica
- Elliott Sharp - guitar
- Doug Wieselman - tenor saxophone
- Dave Tronzo - guitar
- Bobby Previte - drums
- Dave Hofstra - electric bass, tuba
