= The Early Middle Years =

Studio album by Tone Dogs
- Released: 1991
- Recorded: 1990
- Studio: Dogfish Studios, Newberg, OR
- Genre: Rock in Opposition
- Length: 56:14
- Label: Soleilmoon
- Producer: Drew Canulette, Tone Dogs

Tone Dogs chronology
Ankety Low Day (1990)	The Early Middle Years (1991)

The Early Middle Years is the second studio album by Tone Dogs, released in 1991 by Soleilmoon Recordings. In reviewing the album for Option, critic Mark Sullivan said, "The Tone Dogs play art-rock with a hard edge, their experimental streak appears in surreal lyrics, odd meters, unusual instrumentation (two basses and drums on some tracks), and eclecticism."

== Track listing ==
No.	Title	Writer(s)	Length
1.	"(When George Bush Was Head of The) C.I.A."	Amy Denio	4:22
2.	"Agyptian Occordian"	Fred Chalenor, Amy Denio, Will Dowd	2:14
3.	"Salvatore"	Amy Denio, Chip Doring	3:13
4.	"Eyeohyewahseedee"	Amy Denio	2:40
5.	"Tumbling"	Amy Denio	5:25
6.	"Spanish Eyes"	Amy Denio	5:34
7.	"Waltz"	Fred Chalenor, Amy Denio	3:24
8.	"Mr. Awfully Nice"	Fred Chalenor, Amy Denio	3:58
9.	"Traffic Island Psycho"	Amy Denio	3:47
10.	"Klezzy"	traditional	2:42
11.	"Sprinkling of Marie"	Hanns Eisler	2:53
12.	"Major Minor"	Amy Denio	4:07
13.	"Good A.M."	Fred Chalenor	3:28
14.	"Three Fell Swoops"	Drew Canulette, Fred Chalenor, Amy Denio, Will Dowd	8:26

== Personnel ==
Adapted from The Early Middle Years liner notes.

Tone Dogs

- Fred Chalenor – bass guitar, electric guitar
- Amy Denio – vocals, alto saxophone, electric guitar, bass guitar
- Will Dowd – drums, backing vocals

Production and additional personnel

- Drew Canulette – producer, recording, mixing
- John Donald – mixing (14)
- John Golden – mastering
- Lance Limbocker – mixing (14)
- Mike Todd – mixing (14)
- Tone Dogs – producer

== Release history ==
Region	Date	Label	Format	Catalog
United States	1991	Soleilmoon	CD	SOL 10 CD
