= Daylight (Pigpen album) =

Studio album by Pigpen
- Released: 1997
- Recorded: 1997
- Genre: Jazz
- Length: 46:13
- Label: Tim/Kerr
- Producer: Wayne Horvitz

Wayne Horvitz chronology
| Live in Poland (1994) | Daylight (1997) | Cold Spell (1997) |

Daylight is an album by American keyboardist and composer Wayne Horvitz' band Pigpen recorded in 1997 and released on the independent Tim/Kerr label.

== Reception ==
The Allmusic review by Jason Ankeny awarded the album 4 stars calling it "A chaotic, pulsing record".

Professional ratings
Review scores
| Source | Rating |
|---|---|
| Allmusic | 4/5 stars |

== Track listing ==
All compositions by Wayne Horvitz except as indicated

1. "Daylight" - 4:24
2. "V as in Victim" - 6:38
3. "Oh Blue Angels, You Are But a God To Me" - 4:39
4. "Don't Explode On Me" - 1:57
5. "Trouble" - 1:56
6. "Arrive" - 4:58
7. "Mr. Rogers" - 3:55
8. "Tap" - 4:59
9. "Mel" (Fred Chalenor) - 2:40
10. "Duet" - 3:31
11. "The Gift" - 3:46
12. "Trio" - 2:50

== Personnel ==
- Wayne Horvitz - piano, organ, electronics
- Briggan Krauss - alto saxophone
- Fred Chalenor - electric bass
- Mike Stone - drums, percussion
