= V as in Victim =

Studio album by Wayne Horvitz and Pigpen
- Released: 1994
- Recorded: May 1993
- Genre: Jazz
- Length: 42:22
- Label: Avant
- Producer: Wayne Horvitz

Wayne Horvitz chronology
Halfrack (1993)	V as in Victim (1994)	Miss Ann (1993)

V as in Victim is an album by American keyboardist and composer Wayne Horvitz' band Pigpen recorded in 1993 and released on the Japanese Avant label.

== Reception ==
The Allmusic review by Stephen Thomas Erlewine awarded the album 4 stars stating "Equal parts rock and free jazz, V as in Victim is a weird journey through a number of styles and sounds – there's some grooves, some soundscapes and some brutally dissonant variations on free jazz. More often than not, the excursions are successful."

Professional ratings
Review scores
Source	Rating
Allmusic	4/5 stars

== Track listing ==
All compositions by Wayne Horvitz except as indicated

1. "Cause I'm in Love Yeah" – 2:21
2. "Speech" – 3:17
3. "A Portrait of Hank Williams Jr." – 5:18
4. "Light This Candle" – 5:55
5. "Testament" – 2:38
6. "V as in Victim" – 8:24
7. "Stompin' at the Cranium" – 4:41
8. "Again" (Bill Frisell) – 5:09
9. "Jazzmaster" – 2:16
10. "Mr. Rogers" – 2:23

- Recorded at Iron Wood Studio in Seattle, Washington in May 1993

== Personnel ==
- Wayne Horvitz – keyboards
- Briggan Krauss – alto saxophone
- Fred Chalenor – electric bass
- Mike Stone – drums
