= Miracle Mile (Wayne Horvitz album) =

Studio album by Wayne Horvitz
- Released: 1992
- Recorded: 1992
- Genre: Jazz
- Length: 47:25
- Label: Elektra/Nonesuch
- Producer: Wayne Horvitz

Wayne Horvitz chronology
Bring Yr Camera (1988)	Miracle Mile (1992)	Halfrack (1993)

Miracle Mile is an album by American keyboardist and composer Wayne Horvitz's band the President recorded in 1992 and released on the Elektra/Nonesuch label.

== Reception ==
The AllMusic review awarded the album 3 stars, noting that Miracle Mile featured virtually none of the aggression or fast tempos Horvitz displayed as a member of John Zorn's band Naked City in this era. In contrast, Miracle Mile emphasized subtle compositions that represented a "cross-pollination of jazz, ambient, groove, and modern chamber music".

Professional ratings
Review scores
Source	Rating
AllMusic	3/5 stars
The Penguin Guide to Jazz Recordings	3.5/4 stars

== Track listing ==
All compositions by Wayne Horvitz

1. "The Front" - 5:18
2. "Variations on a Theme by W.C. Handy" - 6:32
3. "I'm Downstairs" - 5:21
4. "Shuffle" - 5:59
5. "And Sing This Song" - 4:14
6. "Yuba City" - 7:36
7. "An Open Letter to George Bush" - 6:52
8. "Miracle Mile" - 5:53

Note: "Variations on a Theme by W.C. Handy" is based on "St. Louis Blues".

- Recorded and mixed at Ironwood Studios in Seattle in 1992, with additional recording at Baby Monster Studios and RPM Studios, New York City

== Personnel ==
The President

- Wayne Horvitz - keyboards, amplified piano, harmonica
- Stew Cutler- guitar
- J. A. Deane - trombone, electronics
- Kermit Driscoll - electric bass
- Bobby Previte - drums
- Doug Wieselman - tenor saxophone, clarinet

with guests

- Bill Frisell, Elliott Sharp - guitar
- Denny Goodhew - saxophones
- Ben Steele - guitar controlled sampler
