= Super Sale =

Studio album by Caveman Shoestore
- Released: 2005
- Recorded: 2004
- Studio: Aleph Studios (Seattle, WA)
- Genre: Avant-prog, alternative rock
- Length: 38:01
- Label: Build-a-Buzz
- Producer: Randall Dunn

Caveman Shoestore chronology
| Caveman Hughscore (1995) | Super Sale (2005) |

Professional ratings
Review scores
| Source | Rating |
|---|---|
| AllMusic | 4/5 stars |

Super Sale is the third and final studio album by Caveman Shoestore, released in 2005 by Build-a-Buzz Records.

== Track listing ==
All tracks are written by Fred Chalenor, Elaine di Falco and Henry Franzoni.

| No. | Title | Length |
|---|---|---|
| 1. | "Since the 11th" | 3:44 |
| 2. | "Holidays in Pingpong" | 3:05 |
| 3. | "Desert Cruising" | 2:26 |
| 4. | "How the West Was Wrong" | 3:48 |
| 5. | "Auston Noto" | 3:51 |
| 6. | "90/30" | 1:40 |
| 7. | "Pan the Goat God" | 1:34 |
| 8. | "Zak" | 1:13 |
| 9. | "The West" | 1:41 |
| 10. | "Ozzie Goes to Hollywood" | 1:41 |
| 11. | "Hoverlude" | 2:25 |
| 12. | "Merry-Go-Treadmill" | 2:37 |
| 13. | "Two Freaks Cruising Lombard Listening to The Ventures" | 2:11 |
| 14. | "All Borderlines" | 3:14 |
| 15. | "The Beast" | 2:51 |

== Personnel ==
Adapted from the Super Sale liner notes.

Caveman Shoestore

- Fred Chalenor – Bass guitar, Chapman Stick
- Elaine di Falco – keyboards, vocals
- Henry Franzoni – drums, voice (6)

Production and design

- Mel Dettmer – mastering
- Randall Dunn – production, recording, mixing
- Bob Stark – additional engineering

== Release history ==
| Region | Date | Label | Format | Catalog |
|---|---|---|---|---|
| United States | 2005 | Build-a-Buzz | CD | TK92CD056 |
