= American Bandstand (album) =

Studio album by Wayne Horvitz
- Released: 2000
- Recorded: July 19 & 20, 1999
- Genre: Jazz
- Length: 53:24
- Label: Songlines
- Producer: Wayne Horvitz

Wayne Horvitz chronology
Upper Egypt (1999)	American Bandstand (2000)	From a Window (2000)

American Bandstand is an album by American keyboardist and composer Wayne Horvitz recorded in 1999 and released on the Canadian Songlines label. The album was later released under the title Forever after Dick Clark objected to the original title.

== Reception ==
The Allmusic review by Tim Sheridan awarded the album 4½ stars stating "Working with his band Zony Mash in an acoustic setting, Horvitz creates an album that is rich with flavor".

Professional ratings
Review scores
Source	Rating
Allmusic	4.5/5 stars

== Track listing ==
All compositions by Wayne Horvitz

1. "Ben's Music" - 4:36
2. "Prepaid Funeral" - 5:45
3. "Love, Love, Love" - 4:43
4. "Capricious Midnight" - 3:18
5. "9 To 4" - 4:44
6. "In the Ballroom" - 5:19
7. "Forever" - 5:16
8. "Disingenuous Firefight" - 5:13
9. "Tired" - 5:26
10. "Little Man" - 3:35
11. "American Bandstand" - 5:08
  - Recorded at Studio Litho in Seattle, Washington on July 19 & 20, 1999

== Personnel ==
- Wayne Horvitz - piano
- Timothy Young - guitar
- Keith Lowe - bass
- Andy Roth - drums
