= From a Window (album) =

Studio album by Wayne Horvitz Four Plus One Ensemble
- Released: 2001
- Recorded: August 2000
- Genre: Jazz
- Length: 40:01
- Label: Avant
- Producer: Wayne Horvitz

Wayne Horvitz chronology
| American Bandstand (1999) | From a Window (2001) | Sweeter Than the Day (2001) |

From a Window is an album by American keyboardist and composer Wayne Horvitz's Four Plus One Ensemble recorded in 2000 and released on the Japanese Avant label.

== Reception ==
The Allmusic review by Michael G. Nastos awarded the album 4 stars stating "This style of thoroughly modern music teeters on a nostalgic, rustic, days-gone-by feeling, as reflected by the men's bowery and women's club black-and-white cover photos. The intriguing music world of Horvitz exists as both cultures somehow meet on an imaginary plane, and it's in a universe well worth entering".

Professional ratings
Review scores
| Source | Rating |
|---|---|
| Allmusic | 4/5 stars |

== Track listing ==
All compositions by Wayne Horvitz

1. "Crispin And Lisa's Duet" – 5:15
2. "Sweeter Than the Day" – 5:36
3. "Julian's Ballad" – 5:23
4. "People Just Float" – 6:29
5. "Leave Here Now" – 10:11
6. "From a Window" – 8:35
7. "Willy's Music" – 8:08

- Recorded at Litho Studio in Seattle, Washington in August 2000

== Personnel ==
- Wayne Horvitz – piano, prepared piano, Hammond B-3 organ, pump organ, synthesizers, toy piano
- Eyvind Kang – violin, viola
- Tucker Martine – live electronic processing, live drum machine
- Julian Priester – trombone
- Reggie Watts – keyboards, vocals, live drum machine, piano
- Skerik – baritone saxophone
