= Live in Seattle (Zony Mash album) =

Live album by Zony Mash
- Released: 2002
- Recorded: May and June 2001
- Genre: Jazz
- Length: 56:37
- Label: Liquid City
- Producer: Wayne Horvitz

Wayne Horvitz chronology
| Sweeter Than the Day (2001) | Live in Seattle (2002) | Film Music 1998-2001 (2001) |

Live in Seattle is a live album by American keyboardist and composer Wayne Horvitz's Zony Mash recorded in 2001 and released on the Liquid City label.

== Reception ==
The Allmusic review by Sean Westergaard awarded the album 3½ stars stating "this is a great-sounding example of what Zony Mash can do with a little more room to stretch out... Live in Seattle is a great set from a great band. Highly recommended".

Professional ratings
Review scores
| Source | Rating |
|---|---|
| Allmusic | 3.5/5 stars |
| The Penguin Guide to Jazz Recordings | 3/4 stars |

== Track listing ==
All compositions by Wayne Horvitz except as indicated

1. "Meet the Zony Mash" - 7:03
2. "Slide By" - 10:12
3. "Bad Traffic" - 9:40
4. "In the Lounge" - 7:37
5. "Let's Get Mashed" - 5:07
6. "Upper Egypt" (Pharoah Sanders) - 9:27
7. "Spice Rack" - 7:31

- Recorded live at The Rainbow in Seattle, Washington in May and June 2001

== Personnel ==
- Wayne Horvitz - Hammond B-3 organ, Nord Lead, DX-7
- Timothy Young - electric guitar
- Keith Lowe - electric bass
- Andy Roth - drums
