= Daylighting =

Daylighting can refer to:

- Daylighting (architecture), use of windows for indirect lighting
- Daylighting (intersections), improving road visibility at intersections
- Daylighting (streams), restoration of a previously buried watercourse
- Daylighting (tunnels), opening a transportation tunnel

== See also ==
- Curb extension, a traffic-calming measure
