= Living Daylights (jazz band) =

American musical trio

- Origin: Seattle, Washington, U.S.
- Genres: Jazz
- Years active: 1995–present
- Labels: Liquid City
- Members: Jessica Lurie; Arne Livingston; Dale Fanning

Living Daylights is a progressive jazz trio from Seattle, composed of Jessica Lurie (alto/tenor sax and flute), Arne Livingston (bass), and Dale Fanning (drums). They have toured with John Scofield, Groove Collective, Robert Walter, Wayne Shorter, Maceo Parker, and Soulive.

A 2000 review of the Earshot Jazz Festival described the band as the "most promising among the four Seattle acts appearing on opening night", and a "jam-jazz juggernaut fronted by saxophonist Jessica Lurie" that "spin a taut musical yarn, one that reflects a dazzlingly rhythmic sense of melody".

== Discography ==
- Falling Down Laughing (1995)
- 500 Pound Cat (1998)
- Electric Rosary (2000)
- Night of the Living Daylights (2003)
