= Dinner at Eight (album) =

Studio album by Wayne Horvitz
- Released: 1986
- Recorded: September 1985
- Genre: Jazz
- Length: 33:38
- Label: Dossier
- Producer: Wayne Horvitz

Wayne Horvitz chronology
Some Order, Long Understood (1982)	Dinner at Eight (1986)	The President (1985)

Dinner at Eight is an album by American keyboardist and composer Wayne Horvitz recorded in 1985 and released on the German Dossier label and re-released on Abstrakce Records

== Reception ==
The AllMusic review by Brian Olewnick awarded the album 3 stars stating "several of the compositions tend to linger quite pleasantly in one's memory".

Professional ratings
Review scores
Source	Rating
AllMusic	3/5 stars

== Track listing ==
All compositions by Wayne Horvitz except as indicated

1. "Dinner at Eight" - 1:45
2. "This New Generation" - 3:26
3. "3 Questions" - 2:36
4. "Conjunction for C.B." - 2:30
5. "True" - 2:51
6. "Extra Extra" (Horvitz, Doug Wieselman) - 3:31
7. "In Fields They Lay" - 2:40
8. "Second Line" - 4:12
9. "Danced All Night" - 2:32
10. "These Hard Times" - 4:15
11. "Reprise for C.B." - 3:20

== Personnel ==
- Wayne Horvitz - Yamaha DX7, drum machine
- Elliott Sharp - guitar, bass
- Chris Brown - gazamba, wing
- Doug Wieselman - clarinet, tenor saxophone
- Joey Peters - electronic drums
