= Daylight Building (Bellingham, Washington) =

- U.S. National Register of Historic Places
- Location within Washington (state)
- Location: 1201-1213 N. State St Bellingham, Washington
- Coordinates: 48°44′59″N 122°28′43″W
- Built: 1904
- Architect: Frank C. Burns
- Architectural style: Revivalism
- NRHP reference No.: 04001370
- Added to NRHP: December 15, 2004

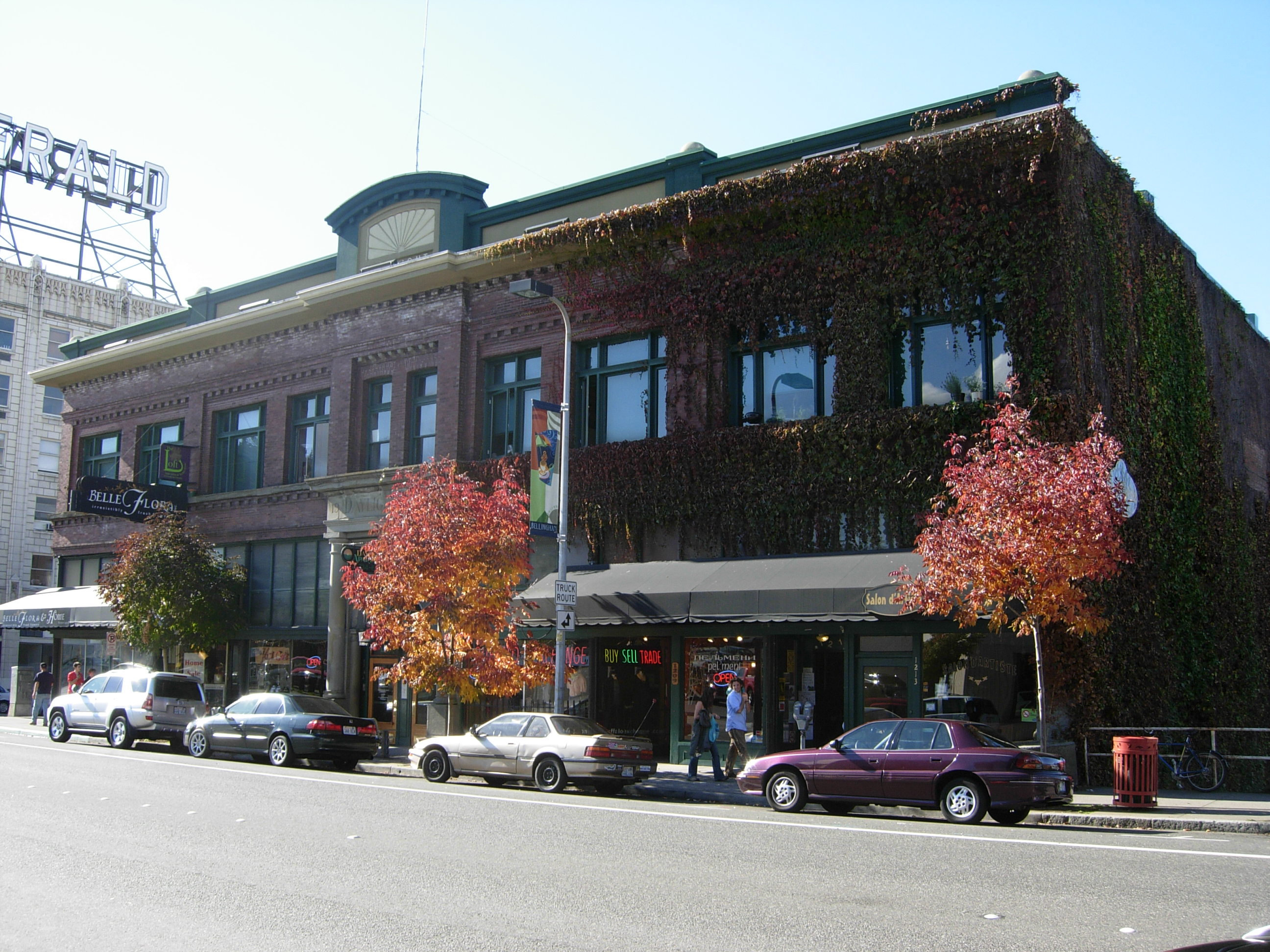
Daylight building

The Daylight Building, located at 1201-1213 N. State St, is a historical building located in Bellingham, Washington, United States.

== History ==
It was designed by local architect Frank C. Burns and was completed in 1904. The exterior of the building was built out of sandstone and brick.

Some early tenants of the building included a dressmaker, a dry goods store, a lawyer, a real estate agent, and a music school.

From 1910 to 1926, the Union Printing company had its headquarters in the building.

In early 1928, a Montgomery Ward branch opened in the building. In July 1928, a large fire broke out on the basement of the building and damaged much of the stock of Montgomery Ward. Several apartments were also destroyed. The origins of the fire were undetermined. The store reopened in September 1928 after repairs. In December of the same year, an arsonist attempted to set fire to the building again.

On December 13, 1933, 34-year-old man named Herbert E. Myers was found fatally stabbed at the entrance of the building. He died of his would en route to the hospital. The suspect was described as a large man who was previously seen arguing with Myers near a telephone booth. The case eventually went cold and no one was charged with Myers' murder.

In 1944, the building was sold to N. A. Buchinoff, then owner of the Bellingham Upholstering Company.

In June 1999, a thrift store named the Old Town Christian Ministries Thrift Store opened in the basement of the building. The thrift store later closed in May 2003.

In 2003, the basement level of the building was remodeled and a restaurant and live music venue named Nightlight Lounge was later opened. The venue frequently held live music events, such as Chris Whitley, Johnathan Richman, The Thermals, and Canadian band Cuff The Duke in 2004. The Nightlight Lounge closed permanently in 2010 due to failure to pay taxes. In 2011, a nightclub named The Underground opened in the basement space. The Underground closed it doors permanently on August 25, 2024, and is slated to be rebranded as a venue named Bar 211 under the same owners.

The building was added to the National Register of Historic Places on December 15, 2004.

In May 2011, significant damage was done to Pel Meni restaurant, located on the ground floor of the building. The fire caused the evacuation of several apartments and businesses. The estimated damage was over $20,000. Pel Meni later reopened and continues to operate.
