= Caveman Shoestore =

Avant-prog group

- Origin: Portland, Oregon, U.S.
- Genres: Rock in Opposition, art rock
- Years active: 1991–2018
- Labels: Tim/Kerr, Build-a-Buzz
- Past members: Fred Chalenor; Amy DeVargas; Elaine di Falco; Henry Franzoni

Caveman Shoestore was an avant-prog group founded in 1991 by bassist Fred Chalenor, percussionist Henry Franzoni and keyboardist/vocalist Elaine di Falco.

== History ==
Bassist Fred Chalenor and drummer Henry Franzoni had frequently collaborated since 1976, most notably in the band Face Ditch. While Chalenor and Franzoni were playing at a music festival in Portland, OR, when they met vocalist Elaine di Falco, who was performing in the punk group God Wads. The trio decided to form Caveman Shoestore and recorded a ten track cassette titled Rock in 1991.

Their debut studio album, titled Master Cylinder, was released by Tim/Kerr Records in 1992. The album drew from a wide range of influences, including Conlon Nancarrow and Black Sabbath, and was compared to Discipline-era King Crimson. They followed up that album with 1994's Flux, which featured Amy DeVargas on vocals. The band collaborated with Hugh Hopper for Caveman Hughscore, released in 1995. After a ten year hiatus, the band reunited and released their third full-length album Super Sale in 2005. A final album Frankensongs was recorded in 2006, finished in 2010, and released in 2020. From 2011-2018 Fred Chalenor, Henry Franzoni, and Doug Therealt (Guitar) formed a noise improv trio operating under the same name. Mike Gamble (Guitar) sat in for one gig. Fred Chalenor died of early onset Alzheimers on June 23, 2018, and was inducted into the Oregon Music Hall of Fame in 2023.

== Discography ==
Studio albums

- Master Cylinder (Tim/Kerr, 1992)
- Flux (Tim/Kerr, 1994)
- Caveman Hughscore (Tim/Kerr, 1995)
- Super Sale (Build-a-Buzz, 2005)
- Frankensongs (Buildabuzz, 2010)
