= Jessica Lurie =

American composer, performance artist and woodwind player

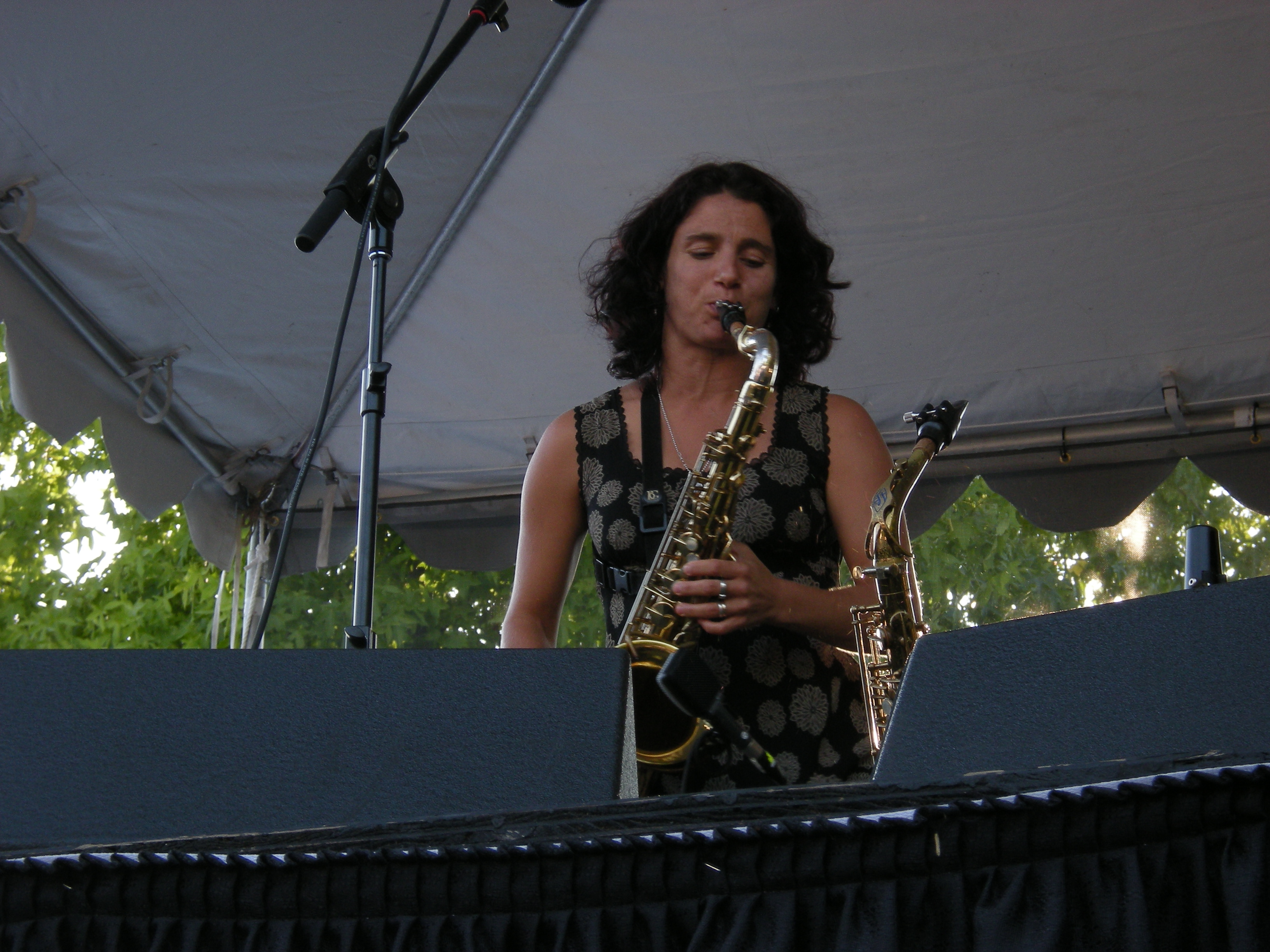

Background information
- Occupations: Composer; performance artist
- Instrument: Woodwind

Jessica Lurie is an American composer, performance artist and woodwind player, originally hailing from Seattle and now living in Brooklyn, New York.

Lurie first gained notice as a member of The Billy Tipton Memorial Saxophone Quartet, an all-female horn ensemble who released its first album in 1993. In 1995, she also had a first release with the group Living Daylights, which performs jazz-jamband music. She has also performed as the leader of the Jessica Lurie Ensemble since 2002.

She composed music for No Sleep Won't Kill You (2010) by Croatian filmmaker Marko Mestrovic, co-scored with composer Abraham Gomez-Delgado, and Fibonacci Bread (2012), a short animation by Croatian artist Danijel Zezelj.

== Discography ==
=== Solo albums ===
- La Luce Azzurra (with Metropolizani) (1998)
- Motorbison Serenade (2000, Zipa Music)
- School of One (with Will Dowd) (2002)
- Tiger, Tiger (2005)
- This is what its like to be (with Andrew Drury Duo) (2005, Zipa Music)
- Licorice and Smoke (2006, Zipa Music )
- Long Haul (2017, Zipa Music)

=== With Jessica Lurie Ensemble ===
- !Zipa Buka! (2003, Zipa Music)
- Shop of Wild Dreams (2009, Zipa Music)
- Megaphone Heart (2012, Zipa Music)
- Carambolage (2021)

=== With The Tiptons Sax Quartet ===
- Saxhouse (1993, Knitting Factory, rereleased by Horn Hut in 1994)
- Make It Funky God (1994, Horn Hut)
- Box (1996, New World Records)
- Pollo d'Oro (with Ne Zhdali) (1997, No Man's Land)
- Sunshine Bundtcake (2000, New World Records)
- Short Cuts (2003, Spoot & Zipa)
- Tsunami (2004, No Man's Land/Spoot & Zipa)
- Surrounded by Horns (2004, Stockfisch)
- Drive (2005, Spoot & Zipa)
- Laws Of Motion (2008, Spoot & Zipa)
- Strange Flower (2010, Spoot & Zipa)
- Tiny Lower Case (2014, Spoot & Zipa)
- Wabi Sabi (2021, Sowiesound)

=== With Living Daylights ===
- Falling Down Laughing (1995, Liquid City)
- 500 Pound Cat (1998, Liquid City)
- Electric Rosary (2000, Liquid City)
- Night of the Living Daylights (2003)

=== With Eyvind Kang ===
- 7 NADEs (Tzadik, 1996)
- Theater of Mineral NADEs (Tzadik, 1998)
- The Story of Iceland (Tzadik, 2000)

=== With Jon Madof's Zion80 ===
- Zion80 (Tzadik, 2013)
- Adramelech: Book of Angels Volume 22 (Tzadik, 2014)

=== With La Buya ===
- La Buya (2021)

=== With Breslov Bar Band ===
- Holy Chutzpah (2022)

=== Other appearances ===
- The Posies, Amazing Disgrace (1996, DGC) (tenor saxophone on "Please Return It")
- Giuseppi Logan, ...And They Were Cool (2013, Improvising Beings) (saxophone and flute)
- Circus Amok Band, Citizen*ship (2014) (saxophone, flute, vocals)
- Darshan, Raza (2017, Chant) (alto and baritone saxophone)
