= The living daylights =

English-language idiom

The living daylights is an archaic idiom in English believed to be early 18th century slang for somebody's eyes that subsequently figuratively referred to all vital senses.

The earliest recorded use of this term is in the 1752 novel Amelia by Henry Fielding, in which a character states his readiness to physically assault a particular woman: "If the lady says another such words to me ... I will darken her daylights."

The idiom is now generally used only as part of a wider expression to express intensity in a negative manner, most commonly in the form "to scare the living daylights out of someone" or "to beat the living daylights out of someone."
