= Live in Poland (Wayne Horvitz album) =

Live album by Wayne Horvitz and Pigpen
- Released: 1994
- Recorded: February 3, 1994
- Genre: Jazz
- Length: 61:04
- Label: Cavity Search

Wayne Horvitz chronology
Miss Ann (1993)	Live in Poland (1994)	Daylight (1997)

Live in Poland is a live album by American keyboardist and composer Wayne Horvitz' band Pigpen recorded in 1994 and originally released as an audio companion with the magazine "Jazz à Go-Go" but later released on the Cavity Search label.

== Reception ==
The Allmusic review awarded the album 4 stars.

Professional ratings
Review scores
Source	Rating
Allmusic	4/5 stars

== Track listing ==
All compositions by Wayne Horvitz except as indicated

1. "Band of Joeys" - 3:34
2. "Cause I'm in Love Yeah" - 2:34
3. "Poisonhead" (John Zorn) - 1:26
4. "Sterno" - 6:58
5. "Grind" - 5:05
6. "A Portrait of Hank Williams Jr." - 6:48
7. "The Front" - 9:43
8. "Speech" - 5:24
9. "The Boss" - 5:06
10. "The Very Beginning" - 5:20
11. "Miss Ann" (Eric Dolphy) - 5:24
12. "Mr. Rogers" - 3:57

- Recorded at the Akwarium Jazz Club in Warsaw, Poland on February 3, 1994

== Personnel ==
- Wayne Horvitz - keyboards
- Briggan Krauss - alto saxophone
- Fred Chalenor - electric bass
- Mike Stone - drums
