= Daylight Building (Knoxville, Tennessee) =

- U.S. National Register of Historic Places
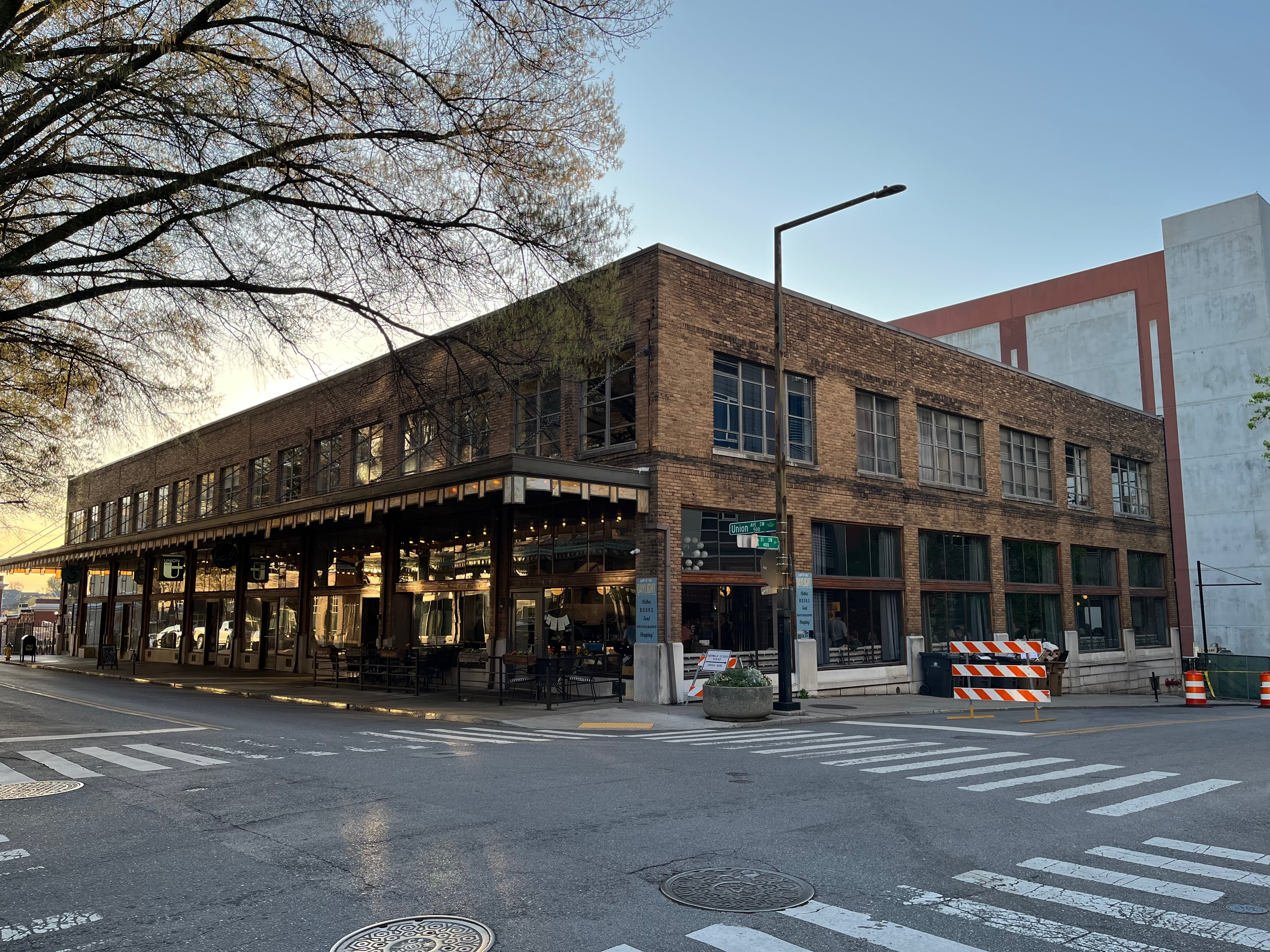
- The building in 2025

- Location within Tennessee Location within the United States
- Location: 501-517 Union Ave., Knoxville, Tennessee
- Coordinates: 35.9643°N 83.9208°W
- Area: less than one acre
- Architectural style: Early Commercial
- NRHP reference No.: 09000956
- Added to NRHP: November 25, 2009

The Daylight Building or Daylight Block is a two-story office and commercial building on Union Avenue in downtown Knoxville, Tennessee. It is listed on the National Register of Historic Places.

== Architecture ==
The Daylight Building, faced with blond brick, was one of several downtown Knoxville buildings built by real estate developer Benjamin Howard Sprankle. The name "Daylight" referred to its design features that provided natural daylight to illuminate its interior. A glass clerestory on its roof allowed sunlight to enter the interior core of the building. Offices lining both sides of a square hallway surrounding the building's core had windows, open either to the outside or to the light well at the building's core.

== History ==
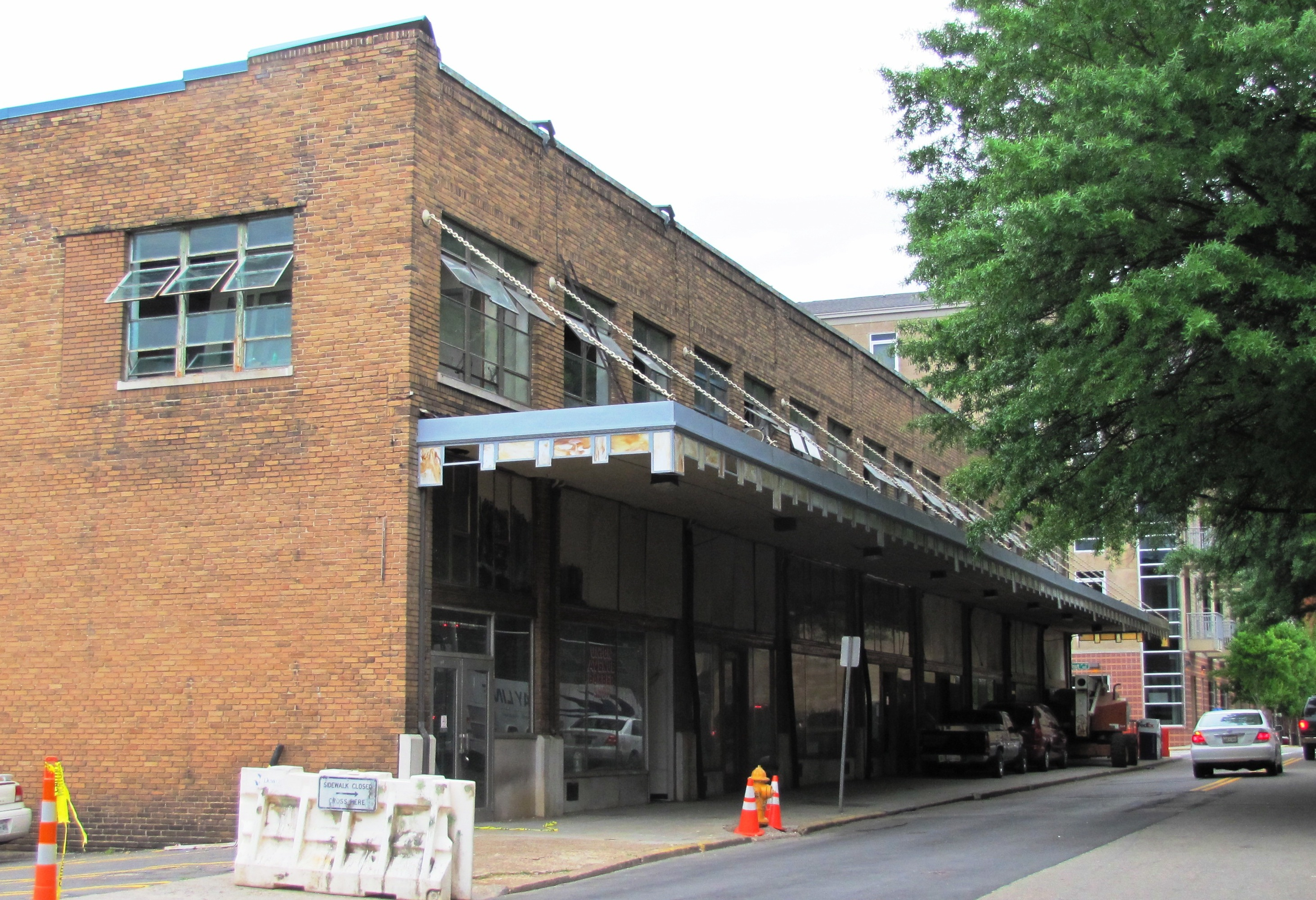
The building in 2010

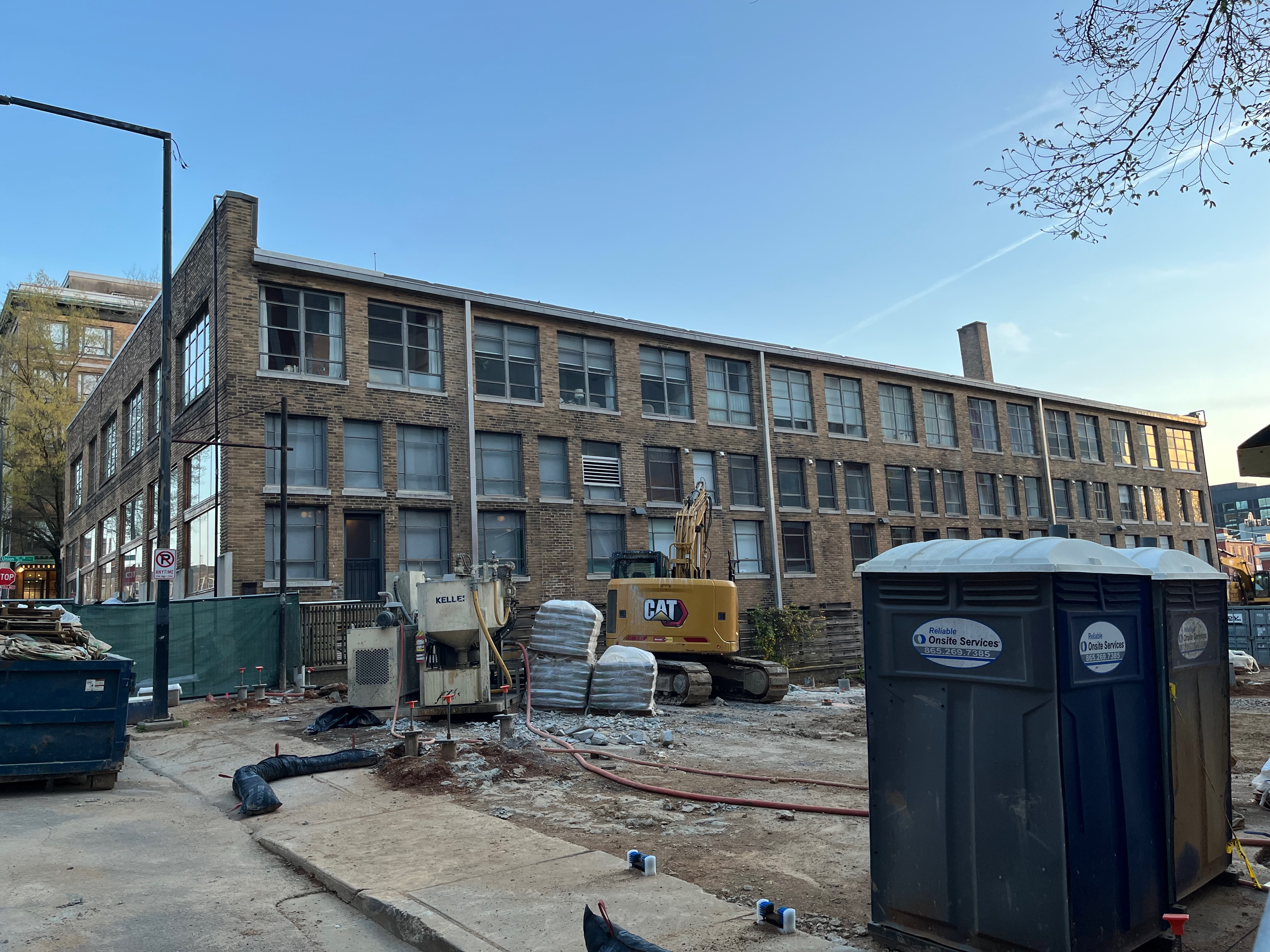
Rear of the building in 2025

The building was completed in 1927. The building served for many years as offices for the Tennessee Valley Authority (TVA). It was one of four downtown Knoxville buildings that housed TVA personnel from 1933 until the early 1980s. Much of TVA's engineering staff was located in the Daylight Building, along with staff of the agency's training and soil conservation organizations. TVA vacated the building when the agency moved into a new office tower in the 1980s.

The Daylight Building was later occupied by Whittle Communications, but most of the building sat empty for years after Whittle moved out in the early 1990s. There were proposals to demolish the building.

Developer David Dewhirst bought the Daylight Building in 2008 for $1.35 million. The following year he began restoration of the building, including its glass clerestory and its daylight illumination, with the intention of creating retail space on the first floor with apartments above. The restoration process revealed some original design details that had gone unnoticed for many years, including copper window frames that had been obscured by yellow paint. In order to qualify for historic preservation tax credits, Dewhirst sought listing on the National Register of Historic Places. The building was listed on the National Register on November 25, 2009. The listing recognized the building's role in TVA's early history and the lack of alterations subsequent to its use by TVA.

Tenants began moving into the building's 36 rental apartments in August 2010.
