= Downtown Lullaby =

Studio album by John Zorn, Elliott Sharp, Bobby Previte and Wayne Horvitz
- Released: June 16, 1998
- Recorded: January 15, 1998
- Studio: Avatar (New York City)
- Genre: Avant-garde
- Length: 47:28
- Label: Depth of Field
- Producer: Bobby Previte

John Zorn chronology
The Circle Maker (1998)	Downtown Lullaby (1998)	Masada: Yod (1998)

Downtown Lullaby is an album of improvised music by John Zorn, Elliott Sharp, Bobby Previte and Wayne Horvitz. The album was released on the Depth of Field label in 1998 and contains seven tracks titled after addresses of performing spaces in the East Village and Soho.

== Reception ==
The Allmusic review by Brian Olewnick awarded the album 2½ stars stating "Downtown Lullaby isn't a bad record but, given the personnel, one would have hoped for more".

Professional ratings
Review scores
Source	Rating
Allmusic	2.5/5 stars

== Track listing ==
All compositions by Horovitz/Previte/Sharp/Zorn

1. "484 Broome" - 5:42
2. "500 West 52nd" - 6:15
3. "Eighth Between B & C" - 6:11
4. "77 White" - 3:57
5. "228 West Broadway" - 9:07
6. "Bleecker & Bowery" - 7:16
7. "1 Morton St (Downtown Lullaby)" - 9:00

== Personnel ==
- Elliott Sharp – electric guitars
- Wayne Horvitz – Hammond organ, piano, keyboards
- Bobby Previte – drums
- John Zorn – alto saxophone
