= Wayne Horvitz =

American composer, keyboardist and producer (born 1955)

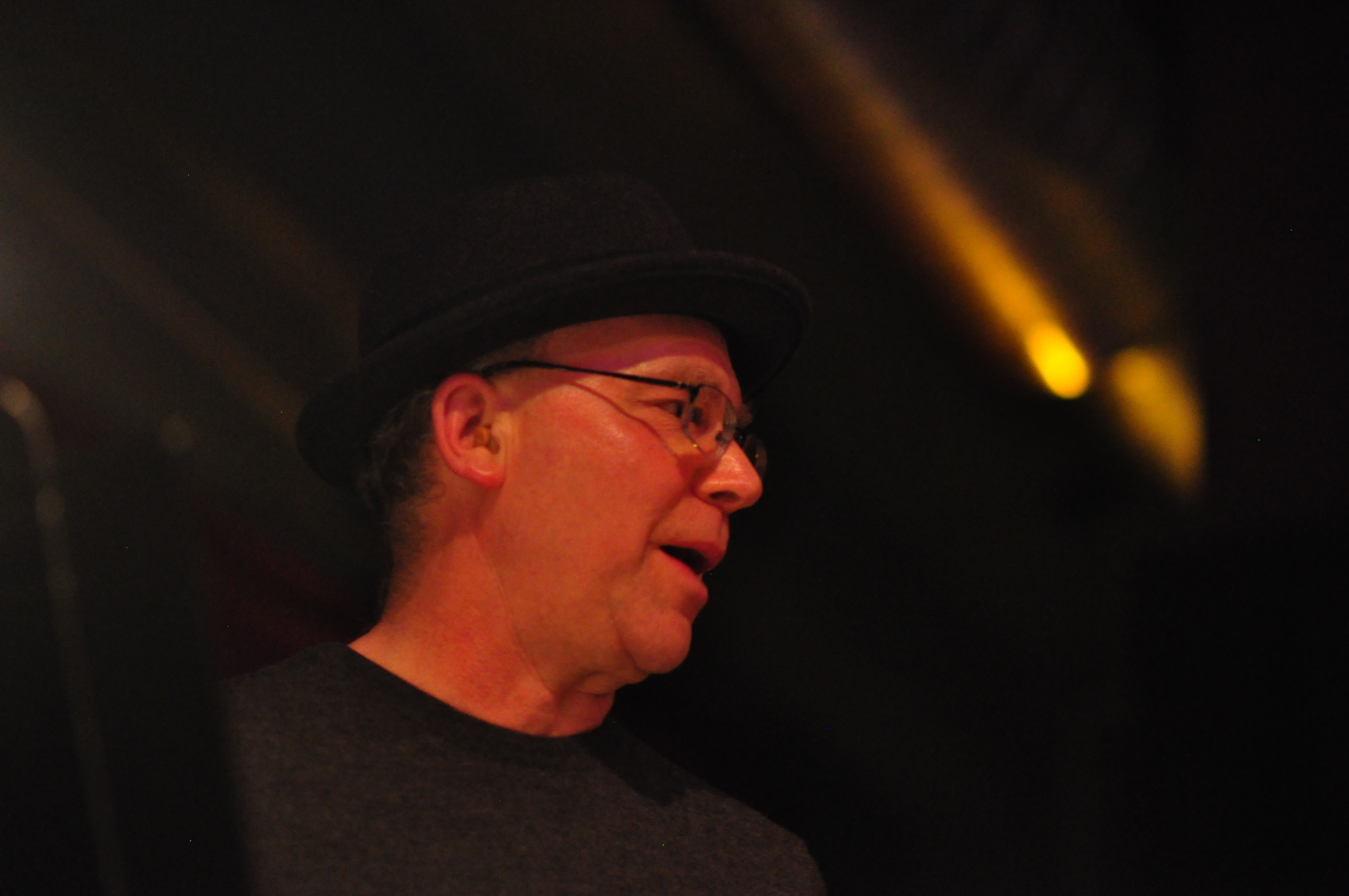
- Horvitz in 2016

Background information
- Born: September 1, 1955 (age 70); New York City, U.S.
- Origin: Seattle, Washington
- Genres: Jazz, experimental rock, classical
- Occupation: Musician
- Instrument: Keyboards
- Website: www.waynehorvitz.net

Wayne Horvitz (born September 1, 1955) is an American composer, keyboardist and record producer. He came to prominence in the Downtown scene of 1980s and '90s New York City, where he met his future wife, the singer, songwriter and pianist Robin Holcomb. He is noted for working with John Zorn's Naked City among others. Horvitz has since relocated to the Seattle, Washington area where he has several ongoing groups and has worked as an adjunct professor of composition at Cornish College of the Arts.

== Biography ==
Horvitz, a "defiant cross-breeder of genres", has led the groups The President, Pigpen, Zony Mash, and the Four Plus One Ensemble.

Works for theater and dance include music for the 1998 production of Death of a Salesman for Seattle's ACT theater (directed by Gordon Edelstein); productions of Ezra Pound's Elektra and the American premiere of Harold Pinter's Mountain Language, both directed by Carey Perloff. In 1992 choreographer Paul Taylor created a new work, OZ, to eleven compositions by Wayne Horvitz in collaboration with the White Oak Dance Company. Other theater and dance works include music for Bill Irwin's Broadway show, Strictly NY, and productions by the Liz Lerman Dance Exchange, Ammi Legendre, Nikki Apino and House of Dames and the Crispin Spaeth Dance Company.

Horvitz has also composed and produced music for a variety of video, film, television and other multimedia projects, including two projects with director Gus Van Sant, a full length score for PBS's Chihuly Over Venice, and two films about the creation of Seattle's EMP museum. His 85-minute score to Charlie Chaplin's film The Circus, for two pianos, two clarinets, and violin premiered in January 2000 in Oporto, Portugal.

As of April 2007 Horvitz performs with Gravitas Quartet, Sweeter Than The Day and Varmint. Since 2008, Horvitz has led The Golden Road, playing music from the early years of The Grateful Dead. In December 2011, Horvitz opened the Royal Room, a live music venue in Columbia City, Seattle. Since that time he has developed his technique of conduction, a framework for conducted improvisation using hand gestures that refer to precomposed musical structures that draws on his previous work with Butch Morris.

== Discography ==
=== Leader ===
- No Place Fast (Parachute, 1979)
- Simple Facts (Theatre For Your Mother, 1981)
- Dinner at Eight (Dossier, 1985)
- This New Generation (Elektra/Musician, 1985)
- Monologue (Cavity Search, 1997)
- Film Works (Avant, 2003)
- Music For 10 Musicians (2025)

Wayne Horvitz, 4+1 Ensemble (+ Reggie Watts, Eyvind Kang, Julian Priester, Tucker Martine)

- 4+1 Ensemble (Intuition, 1998)
- From a Window (Avant, 2001)

Wayne Horvitz, Gravitas Quartet ( + Ron Miles, Peggy Lee, Sara Schoenbeck)

- Way Out East (Songlines, 2006)

Wayne Horvitz, Sweeter Than the Day ( + Timothy Young, Keith Lowe, Andy Roth)

- American Bandstand - later released as Forever (Songlines, 2000)
- Sweeter Than the Day (Songlines, 2001)
- Live at the Rendezvous (Liquid City, 2005)

Pigpen (Wayne Horvitz, Briggan Krauss, Mike Stone, Fred Chalenor)

- Halfrack (Tim/Kerr, 1993)
- Kind of Dead b/w Pattern 56 Interlude 7" single (Cavity Search, 1993)
- V as in Victim (Avant, 1993)
- Live in Poland (Cavity Search, 1994)
- Miss Ann (Tim/Kerr, 1995)
- Daylight (Tim/Kerr, 1997)

The President (Wayne Horvitz, Bobby Previte, Dave Sewelson, Kevin Cosgrove, Joe Gallant / Stew Cutler, Doug Wieselman, Dave Hofstra)

- The President (Dossier, 1987)
- Bring Yr Camera (Elektra/Musician, 1988)
- Miracle Mile (Elektra Nonesuch, 1992)

Zony Mash (Wayne Horvitz, Timothy Young, Fred Chalenor / Keith Lowe, Andy Roth, Briggan Krauss)

- Cold Spell (Knitting Factory, 1997)
- Brand Spankin' New (Knitting Factory, 1998)
- Upper Egypt (Knitting Factory, 1999)
- Live in Seattle (Liquid City, 2002)
- Live at the Royal Room (Fully Altered Media, 2012)

=== Co-leader ===
Robin Holcomb / Wayne Horvitz

- Solos (Songlines, 2004)

Wayne Horvitz, Butch Morris, William Parker Trio

- Some Order, Long Understood (Black Saint, 1982)

Wayne Horvitz, Butch Morris, Bobby Previte Trio

- Nine Below Zero (Sound Aspects, 1987)
- Todos Santos ... Play Robin Holcomb (Sound Aspects, 1988)

Wayne Horvitz / Ron Samworth/ Peggy Lee/ Dylan van der Schyff

- Intersection Poems (Spool, 2005)

Mylab (Tucker Martine, Wayne Horvitz…)

- Mylab (Sony BMG, 2004)

New York Composers' Orchestra (Wayne Horvitz, Herb Robertson, Steven Bernstein, Marty Ehrlich, Ray Anderson, Robin Holcomb,…)

- NY Composers Orchestra (New World, 1990)
- First Program in Standard Time (New World, 1992)

Ponga (Wayne Horvitz, Dave Palmer, Bobby Previte, Skerik)

- Ponga (Loosegroove, 1998)
- Psychological (P-vine, 2000)

Donald Rubinstein, Wayne Horvitz and Zony Mash

- A Man Without Love (Blue Horse, 1998)

The Sonny Clark Memorial Quartet (John Zorn, Wayne Horvitz, Ray Drummond, Bobby Previte)

- Voodoo (Black Saint, 1985)

John Zorn, Elliott Sharp, Bobby Previte, Wayne Horvitz

- Downtown Lullaby (Depth of Field, 1998)

=== As sideman ===
With Bill Frisell

- Is That You? (Elektra/Musician, 1990)
- Good Dog, Happy Man (Nonesuch, 1999)

With Robin Holcomb

- Larks, They Crazy (Sound Aspects, 1988)
- Robin Holcomb (Elektra/Musician, 1990)
- Rockabye (Elektra/Musician, 1992)
- The Big Time (Nonesuch, 2002)
- The Point of It All (Songlines, 2010)

With Bobby Previte

- Empty Suits (Gramavision, 1990)
- Slay the Suitors (Avant, 1993)

With Michael Shrieve

- Fascination (CMP, 1994)
- Two Doors "In the Palace of Dreams" (CMP, 1995)

With Hal Wilner and James Grauerholz on William S. Burroughs

- Naked Lunch (Warner, 1995)
- Let Me Hang You (Khannibalism, 2016)

With John Zorn

- Archery (Parachute, 1981)
- Locus Solus (Rift, 1983)
- The Big Gundown (Nonesuch, 1985)
- Cobra (Hathut, 1987)
- Spillane (Elektra/Nonesuch, 1987)
- Naked City Live, Vol. 1: The Knitting Factory 1989 (Tzadik, 2002)
- Naked City (Elektra/Nonesuch, 1990)
- Torture Garden (Toy Factory, 1990)
- Grand Guignol (Avant, 1992)
- Heretic (Avant, 1992)
- Leng Tch'e (Toy Factory, 1992)
- Radio (Avant, 1993)
- Absinthe (Avant, 1993)
- The Bribe (Tzadik, 1998)

=== Composer ===
- Seattle Chamber Players - Otis Spann and Other Compositions, 2001
- Koehne Quartet - Whispers, Hymns and a Murmur, Tzadik, 2006
