= Fred Chalenor =

American bassist (1955–2018)

- Born: December 29, 1955; Seattle, Washington, U.S.
- Died: June 23, 2018 (aged 62)
- Genres: Rock in Opposition, avant-prog, art rock
- Occupation: Musician
- Instrument(s): Bass, electric guitar, banjo, keyboards, vocals
- Years active: 1978–2018
- Labels: C/Z, Tim/Kerr

Fred Chalenor (December 29, 1955 – June 23, 2018) was an American bassist, most recognized for his work in the bands Caveman Shoestore, Tone Dogs, and Face Ditch. He also collaborated on numerous occasions with composer and keyboardist Wayne Horvitz, recording with him in Pigpen and Zony Mash, and with composer and percussionist Robert Mike Mahaffay of Tres Gone.

== Biography ==
Fred Chalenor was born December 29, 1955, in Seattle, Washington. His first band was Zanzibar, a group led by guitarist Rick Adams based in Portland, Oregon. In 1978, Fred left the band overseas to perform in a folk duo. After that project disintegrated, he moved back to the United States and performed alongside musicians such as Henry Kaiser and Owen Maercks in the Bay Area. Chalenor's first studio performance credit was on Owen Maercks' eponymous debut released in 1978.

Chalenor had met fellow musicians Neil Minturn and Henry Franzoni when he was still performing in Zanzibar. Together, they formed Face Ditch in February 1979 who based themselves in the Portland area, moving to Seattle in 1981 and then Franzoni and Chalenor moving to NYC in 1983. The group broke up numerous times over their existence and issued two self-released cassettes (In the Interim and All Fall Down). Chalenor and Franzoni remained the only consistent members until the band finally parted ways in early 1985 after a show in New York City. In 2000, the original line-up reunited and digitally released their first official album in 2004.

Chalenor died on June 23, 2018.

== Discography ==
Year	Artist	Album	Label
1978	Owen Maercks	Owen Maercks	self-released
1990	Tone Dogs	Ankety Low Day	C/Z
1991	Tone Dogs	The Early Middle Years	Soleilmoon
1992	Caveman Shoestore	Master Cylinder	Tim/Kerr
1993	Pigpen	Halfrack	Tim/Kerr
1994	Pigpen	V as in Victim	Avant
1994	Caveman Shoestore	Flux	Tim/Kerr
1995	w/ Elliott Sharp and Henry Franzoni	Boodlers	Cavity Search
1997	Boodlers	Counter Fit	Tim/Kerr
1997	Sue Ann Harkey	Fulcrum	CNLF
1997	Zony Mash	Cold Spell	Knitting Factory
1997	Hughscore	Highspotparadox	Tim/Kerr
1997	Pigpen	Daylight	Tim/Kerr
1998	Zony Mash	Brand Spankin' New	Knitting Factory
1999	Jeff Greinke	Ride	First World
1999	Hughscore	Delta Flora	Cuneiform
1999	The Walkabouts	Trail of Stars	Glitterhouse
2001	LAND	Road Movies	First World
2002	Curlew	Meet the Curlews!	Cuneiform
2003	Curlew	Mercury	Cuneiform
2004	Face Ditch	Face Ditch	Build-A-Buzz
2005	Caveman Shoestore	Super Sale	Build-A-Buzz
2007	Caveman Shoestore	Frankensongs	Build-A-Buzz
