= Tim/Kerr =

Tim/Kerr Records
- Founder: Thor Lindsay & Tim Kerr
- Status: Defunct
- Country of origin: United States
- Location: Portland, Oregon

Tim/Kerr (also known as T/K) was an American independent record label in Portland, Oregon, United States, run by Thor Lindsay and Thomas "Tim" Kerr IV from 1985 until 1999. Between 1978 and 1984 Lindsay and Kerr were also co-owners of an independent record store in Portland called Singles Going Steady (not to be confused with the later store in Seattle of the same name).

In a 1996 Interview with Billboard magazine, Lindsay stated that the label had been founded originally to release a collaboration between William S. Burroughs and Gus Van Sant titled The Elvis of Letters. The label also released albums by Everclear and The Dandy Warhols, both of whom were later signed by Capitol Records. In 1992 Tim/Kerr released a tribute compilation by Pacific Northwest artists called Eight Songs for Greg Sage and the Wipers. Later, more artists were added, it was re-issued on CD as Fourteen Songs for Greg Sage and the Wipers. In 1993 the label released a collaboration between Kurt Cobain and author William S. Burroughs titled The "Priest" They Called Him.

According to AllMusic, the following musicians had releases through Tim/Kerr:

- Bush Tetras
- Caveman Shoestore
- Dharma Bums
- Daniel Johnston
- Dave "Snaker" Ray
- Everclear
- John Fahey
- Richard Hell
- Hole
- Wayne Horvitz
- "Spider" John Koerner
- Peter Laughner
- Napalm Beach
- Pere Ubu
- Poison Idea
- The Posies
- The Raincoats
- Greg Sage
- Smegma
- Super Deluxe
- Wipers
