= The Decemberists discography =

Band discography

The discography of The Decemberists, the indie/folk rock band from Portland, Oregon, United States.

== Albums ==
=== Studio albums ===
List of studio albums, with selected chart positions and certifications
Title	Album details	Peak chart positions										Certifications
Title	Album details	US	AUS	AUT	BEL (FL)	CAN	GER	IRL	NED	SCO	UK	Certifications
Castaways and Cutouts	Released: May 21, 2002; Label: Hush; Formats: CD, digital download, vinyl	—	—	—	—	—	—	—	—	—	—	
Her Majesty the Decemberists	Released: September 9, 2003; Label: Kill Rock Stars; Formats: CD, digital download, vinyl	—	—	—	—	—	—	—	—	—	—	
Picaresque	Released: March 22, 2005; Label: Kill Rock Stars; Formats: CD, digital download, vinyl	128	—	—	—	—	—	—	—	—	—	
The Crane Wife	Released: October 3, 2006; Label: Capitol; Formats: CD, digital download, vinyl	35	— (Note: The Crane Wife did not enter the Australian ARIA Albums Chart but peaked at number six on the ARIA Hitseekers Chart.)	—	100	—	—	—	— (Note: The Crane Wife did not enter the Dutch Album Top 100, but peaked at number 11 on the Dutch Alternative Top 30 Albums Chart.)	—	127	
The Hazards of Love	Released: March 24, 2009; Label: Capitol; Formats: CD, digital download, vinyl	14	73	—	—	—	—	—	— (Note: The Hazards of Love did not enter the Dutch Album Top 100, but peaked at number 22 on the Dutch Alternative Top 30 Albums Chart.)	52	50	
The King Is Dead	Released: January 18, 2011; Label: Capitol; Formats: CD, digital download, vinyl	1	26	52	86	4	41	30	37	22	24	RIAA: Gold
What a Terrible World, What a Beautiful World	Released: January 20, 2015; Label: Capitol; Formats: CD, digital download, vinyl	7	27	23	58	9	37	20	28	15	13	
I'll Be Your Girl	Released: March 16, 2018; Label: Capitol; Formats: CD, digital download, vinyl, cassette	9	86	24	133	34	55	—	125	5	8	
As It Ever Was, So It Will Be Again	Release date: June 14, 2024; Label: YABB; Formats: CD, digital download, vinyl, cassette	89	—	69	—	—	46	—	—	14	92	
"—" denotes a title that did not chart, or was not released in that territory.

=== Live albums ===
Title	Album details	Peak chart positions					
Title	Album details	US	US Folk	US Rock	NED Alt	UK	UK Indie
We All Raise Our Voices to the Air (Live Songs 04.11–08.11)	Released: March 13, 2012; Label: Capitol	78	5	22	20	146	21
Live Home Library, Vol 1: August 11, 2009, Royal Oak Music Theatre	Released: December 4, 2020; Label: YABB	— (Note: Live Home Library, Vol 1: August 11, 2009, Royal Oak Music Theatre did not enter the US Billboard 200, but peaked at number 67 on the US Billboard Top Album Sales Chart.)	—	—	—	—	—
"—" denotes a title that did not chart, or was not released in that territory.

=== Collaborative albums ===
List of collaborative albums, with selected chart positions
Title	Album details	Peak chart positions	
Title	Album details	US Heat	US Folk
The Queen of Hearts (as Offa Rex)	Released: July 14, 2017; Recorded with Olivia Chaney; Label: Nonesuch; Formats: CD, digital download, vinyl	4	12
"—" denotes a title that did not chart, or was not released in that territory.

== EPs ==
Title	EP details	Peak chart positions			
Title	EP details	US	US Folk	US Rock	UK Phys.
5 Songs	Released: 2001; Label: Independently released; Reissued on Hush Records, 2003	—	—	—	—
The Tain	Released: March 4, 2004; Label: Acuarela Discos	—	—	—	28
Picaresqueties	Released: September 13, 2005; Label: Kill Rock Stars	—	—	—	—
Connect Sets	Released: November 17, 2006; Sony Connect Exclusive	—	—	—	—
Live from SoHo	Released: January 16, 2007; iTunes exclusive	—	—	—	—
Live at Bull Moose	Released: April 16, 2011; Label: Capitol; Record Store Day exclusive	—	12	—	—
iTunes Session	Released: August 2, 2011; iTunes exclusive	117	4	36	—
Long Live the King	Released: November 1, 2011; Label: Capitol	44	3	13	—
Florasongs	Released: October 9, 2015; Label: Capitol	64	2	9	38
Traveling On	Released: December 14, 2018; Label: Capitol	— (Note: Traveling On did not enter the US Billboard 200, but peaked at number 79 on the US Billboard Top Album Sales Chart.)	10	— (Note: Traveling On did not enter the US Top Rock Albums chart, but peaked at number 24 on the US Top Alternative Albums Chart.)	—
"—" denotes a title that did not chart, or was not released in that territory.

== Singles ==
Title	Year	Peak chart positions										Album
Title	Year	US Sales	US AAA	US Dance	US Rock	JPN	MEX Air.	POL	SCO	UK	UK Indie	Album
"Billy Liar"	2004	24	—	—	—	—	—	—	—	—	—	Her Majesty the Decemberists
"16 Military Wives"	2005	—	—	—	—	—	—	—	—	119	14	Picaresque
"O Valencia!"	2006	—	14	—	—	—	—	—	71	— (Note: "O Valencia!" did not enter the UK Singles Chart, but peaked at number 64 on the UK Physical Singles Chart Top 100.)	9	The Crane Wife
"The Perfect Crime #2"	2006	4	18	3	—	—	—	—	—	—	—	The Crane Wife
"Valerie Plame"	2008	30	—	—	—	—	—	—	—	—	22	Always the Bridesmaid: Volume I
"Days of Elaine"	2008	33	—	—	—	—	—	—	—	—	21	Always the Bridesmaid: Volume II
"A Record Year for Rainfall"	2008	—	—	—	—	—	—	—	—	—	40	Always the Bridesmaid: Volume III
"The Rake's Song"	2009	5	—	—	—	—	—	—	—	—	— (Note: "The Rake's Song" did not enter the UK Independent Chart, but peaked at number 16 on the UK Independent Singles Breakers Chart.)	The Hazards of Love
"Down by the Water"	2010	—	2	—	33	35	—	9	—	—	—	The King Is Dead
"January Hymn"	2010	6	—	—	— (Note: "January Hymn" did not enter the Hot Rock & Alternative Songs chart, but peaked at number 48 on the Rock Digital Songs chart.)	—	—	—	—	— (Note: "January Hymn" did not enter the UK Singles Chart, but peaked at number 51 on the UK Physical Singles Chart Top 100.)	—	The King Is Dead
"This Is Why We Fight"	2011	—	9	—	40	—	—	6	—	—	—	The King Is Dead
"Calamity Song"	2012	—	4	—	48	—	—	—	—	—	—	The King Is Dead
"One Engine"	2012	—	—	—	—	—	—	—	—	—	—	The Hunger Games: Songs from District 12 and Beyond
"Make You Better"	2014	—	1	—	44	—	—	—	—	— (Note: "Make You Better" did not enter the UK Singles Chart, but peaked at number 61 on the UK Physical Singles Chart Top 100.)	—	What a Terrible World, What a Beautiful World
"The Wrong Year"	2015	—	20	—	—	—	—	—	—	—	—	What a Terrible World, What a Beautiful World
"Cavalry Captain"	2015	—	—	—	—	—	—	—	—	—	—	What a Terrible World, What a Beautiful World
"Why Would I Now?"	2015	—	26	—	—	—	—	—	—	—	—	Florasongs
"Ben Franklin's Song"	2017	—	—	—	15	—	—	—	—	—	—	The Hamildrops
"Severed"	2018	—	1	—	43	—	47	—	—	—	—	I'll Be Your Girl
"Once in My Life"	2018	—	—	—	—	—	—	—	—	—	—	I'll Be Your Girl
"Sucker's Prayer"	2018	—	10	—	—	—	—	—	—	—	—	I'll Be Your Girl
"Traveling On"	2018	—	35	—	—	—	—	—	—	—	—	Traveling On
"Burial Ground" (featuring James Mercer)	2024	—	2	—	— (Note: "Burial Ground" did not enter the Hot Rock & Alternative Songs chart, but peaked at number 23 on the Rock & Alternative Airplay chart.)	—	—	—	—	—	—	As It Ever Was, So It Will Be Again
"Joan in the Garden"	2024	—	—	—	—	—	—	—	—	—	—	As It Ever Was, So It Will Be Again
"All I Want Is You"	2024	—	—	—	—	—	—	—	—	—	—	As It Ever Was, So It Will Be Again
"Oh No!"	2024	—	10	—	— (Note: "Burial Ground" did not enter the Hot Rock & Alternative Songs chart, but peaked at number 40 on the Rock & Alternative Airplay chart.)	—	—	—	—	—	—	As It Ever Was, So It Will Be Again
"The Better Part of Bravery"	2026	—	18	—	—	—	—	—	—	—	—	Wildwood (Original Motion Picture Soundtrack)
"—" denotes a recording that did not chart or was not released in that territory.

== Other charting songs ==
Title	Year	Peak chart positions				Album
Title	Year	US Alt DL	US Rock DL	BEL (FL) Tip	UK Indie	Album
"The Tain"	2004	—	—	—	48	The Tain EP
"Don't Carry It All"	2011	23	40	—	—	The King Is Dead
"Philomena"	2015	—	—	79	—	What a Terrible World, What a Beautiful World
"—" denotes a recording that did not chart or was not released in that territory.

== Compilation appearances ==
Title	Date	Label	Song
Read: Interpreting Björk	2003	Hush Records	"Human Behavior" (Björk cover)
Preserve Volume One	2003	Fractured Discs	"Like A Lion"
Bridging the Distance	2007	Arena Rock	"Think About Me" (Fleetwood Mac cover)
Alternative Rock Xmas	2007	Capitol Records	"Please Daddy (Don't Get Drunk On Christmas)" (John Denver cover) and "Angel, Won't You Call Me"
Dark Was the Night	2009	4AD	"Sleepless"
Metro: The Official Bootleg Series, Volume 1	2010		"We Both Go Down Together"
The Hunger Games: Songs from District 12 and Beyond	2012	Universal Republic	"One Engine"
Live Current: Cover To Cover	2014	89.3 The Current	"Crazy On You" (Heart cover)
Holidays Rule, Volume 2	2017	Capitol	"Jesus Christ" (Big Star cover)
The Suicide Squad	2021	WaterTower	"Sucker's Prayer"

== DVD ==
Title	Date	Label
The Decemberists: A Practical Handbook	March 20, 2007	Kill Rock Stars
Here Come the Waves: The Hazards of Love Visualized	December 1, 2009	Capitol Records
