= We All Raise Our Voices to the Air (Live Songs 04.11–08.11) =

Live album by the Decemberists
- Released: March 13, 2012
- Recorded: 2011
- Venue: various locations in the United States
- Genres: Indie rock; folk rock; indie folk
- Length: 126:00
- Language: English
- Labels: Capitol, Rough Trade

The Decemberists chronology
| Long Live the King (2011) | We All Raise Our Voices to the Air (Live Songs 04.11–08.11) (2012) | What a Terrible World, What a Beautiful World (2015) |

We All Raise Our Voices to the Air (Live Songs 04.11–08.11) is a 2012 live album by the folk rock band the Decemberists. The album was recorded during the 2011 Popes of Pendarvia World Tour to promote the album The King Is Dead at venues across the United States. The album was released as a double Compact Disc and a triple vinyl LP set. The title comes from a line in the track "The Infanta", from the album Picaresque.

== Reception ==
Professional ratings
Aggregate scores
| Source | Rating |
|---|---|
| Metacritic | 77 |
Review scores
| Source | Rating |
| The A.V. Club | B |
| Consequence of Sound | 4/5 stars |
| Drowned in Sound | 8/10 |
| The Independent | 4/5 stars |
| Paste | 7/10 |
| Pitchfork | 6.9/10 |
| PopMatters | 8/10 |
| Rolling Stone | 3/5 stars |

The album received a largely positive reception from critics and holds a 77 at Metacritic with 13 reviews, indicating "generally favorable reviews". Drowned in Sound's David Edwards has called the album "remarkably feisty live record which manages to capture the carnival of their live show with admirable aplomb" noting that The Decemberists are a "band best appreciated live" who embrace vaudeville-type skits and audience participation. Writing for Consequence of Sound, Jake Cohen agrees that the spontaneous banter and theatrics of the album are a strength, but both reviewers lament a lack of visuals to accompany the recording. In a positive review, PopMatters editor Zachary Houle called the album "a sterling document of a band at the peak of their powers showcasing just how good they really are" also praising the between-track banter. Andy Gill of The Independent calls the album a mix of "intelligence and drive" and gave it four out of five stars, comparing the anthemic content to Arcade Fire and R.E.M.

A mixed review came from Stephen M. Deusner of Pitchfork Media. Granting that the band's "heady concepts, genre nods, and oddball experiments... gel fairly well", he still found the onstage antics of the band "too precocious, too juvenile" and opines that a DVD of their performance would only enhance the silliness of their live performance. Paste's Doug Heselgrave called the album "respectable", noting that the musicians were talented, but the mix was too focused on percussion and the performances don't add much to the previously released studio versions of these songs. Steven Hyden of The A.V. Club disagreed with the sentiment, calling the songs "different enough" and compares the engaging performances with a heavy metal band.

== Track listing ==
All songs written by Colin Meloy

Compact Disc 1 and LP side 1

1. "The Infanta" – 5:46 (from Picaresque, 2005)
2. "Calamity Song" – 3:52 (from The King Is Dead, 2011)
3. "Rise to Me" – 4:49 (from The King Is Dead)
4. "The Soldiering Life" – 5:04 (from Her Majesty the Decemberists, 2003)

LP side 2

5. "We Both Go Down Together" – 4:30 (from Picaresque)
6. "The Bagman's Gambit" – 8:27 (from Picaresque)
7. "Down by the Water" – 3:48 (from The King Is Dead)
8. "Leslie Ann Levine" – 4:08 (from Castaways and Cutouts, 2002)

LP side 3

9. "The Rake's Song" – 4:45 (from The Hazards of Love, 2009)
10. "The Crane Wife 1, 2, and 3" – 16:09 (from The Crane Wife, 2006)

Compact Disc 2 and LP side 4

11. "Oceanside" – 3:27 (from 5 Songs, 2001)
12. "Billy Liar" – 6:41 (from Her Majesty the Decemberists)
13. "Grace Cathedral Hill" – 4:25 (from Castaways and Cutouts)
14. "All Arise!" – 4:23 (from The King Is Dead)

LP side 5

15. "Rox in the Box" – 3:07 (from The King Is Dead)
16. "June Hymn" – 4:30 (from The King Is Dead)
17. "Dracula's Daughter > O Valencia!" – 5:26 (from Colin Meloy Sings Live!, 2008 and The Crane Wife)
18. "This Is Why We Fight" – 4:47 (from The King Is Dead)

LP side 6

19. "The Mariner's Revenge Song" – 12:15 (from Picaresque)
20. "I Was Meant for the Stage" – 10:13 (from Her Majesty the Decemberists)

== Recording information ==
Tracks were recorded at the following locations:

- "The Infanta", "The Soldiering Life", and "The Rake's Song" – McMenamins Edgefield Amphitheatre, Troutdale, Oregon
- "Calamity Song", "Oceanside", and "Rox in the Box" – Cobb Energy Performing Arts Centre, Atlanta, Georgia
- "Rise to Me" – Overture Center, Madison, Wisconsin
- "We Both Go Down Together" – Ryman Auditorium, Nashville, Tennessee
- "The Bagman's Gambit" – Benedum Center, Pittsburgh, Pennsylvania
- "Down by the Water" – Iroquois Amphitheatre, Louisville, Kentucky
- "Leslie Ann Levine", "The Crane Wife 1, 2, and 3", and "Billy Liar" – Britt Pavilion, Jacksonville, Oregon
- "Grace Cathedral Hill" – University of Iowa, Iowa City, Iowa
- "All Arise!" – Stubb's, Austin, Texas
- "June Hymn" – Calvin College, Grand Rapids, Michigan
- "This Is Why We Fight" – Marymoor Amphitheatre, Redmond, Washington

== Personnel ==
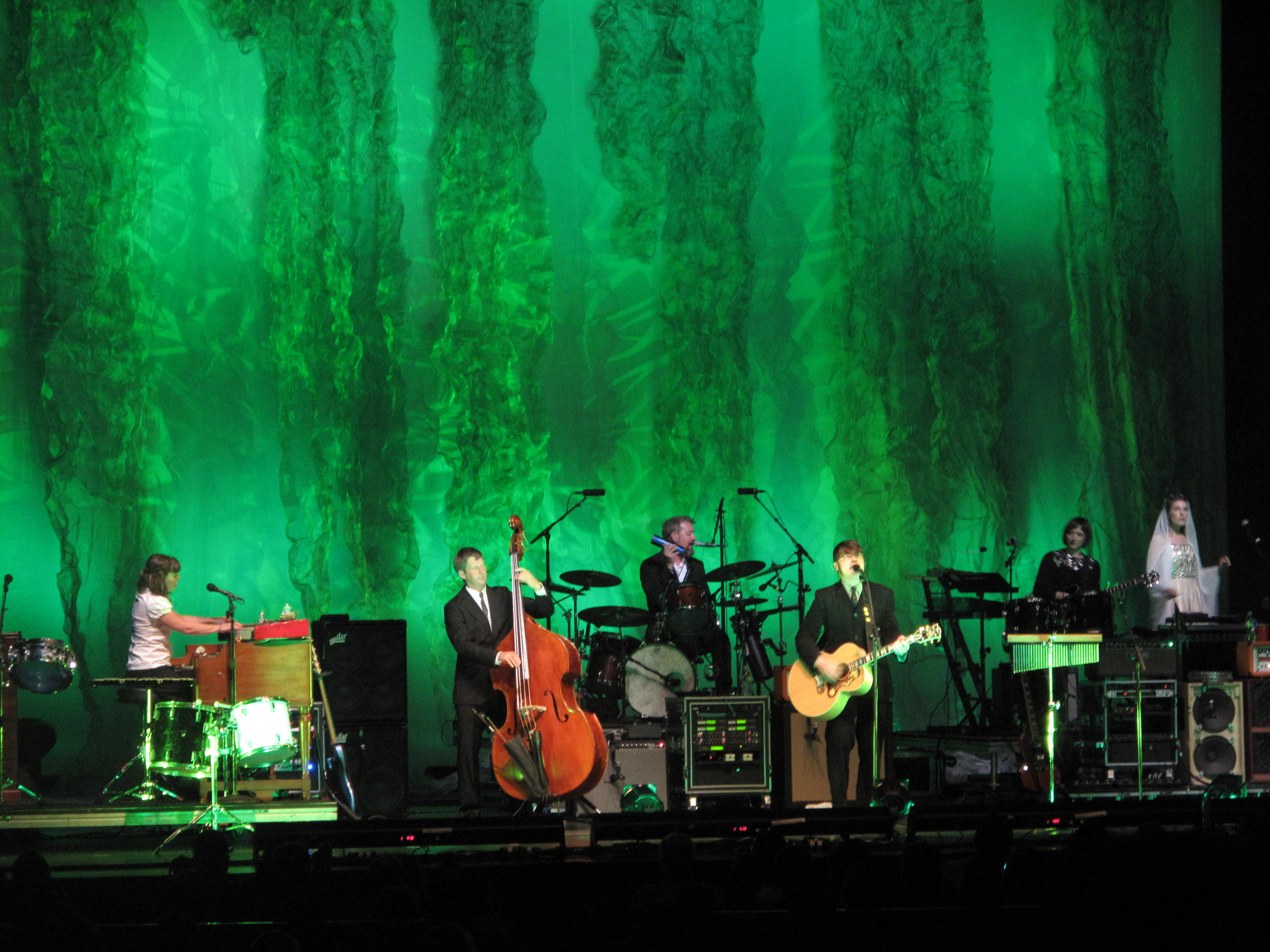
The Decemberists are known for elaborate stage shows, costumes, and audience participation in their concerts

The Decemberists

- Jenny Conlee – keyboards, Hammond B3 organ, glockenspiel
- Chris Funk – electric, acoustic, and pedal steel guitars; bouzouki; mandolin; piano; harmony vocals
- Colin Meloy – lead vocals, acoustic 12- and six-string guitar, electric guitar, bouzouki
- John Moen – drums, harmony vocals
- Nate Query – upright and electric bass

Additional musicians

- Portland Auxiliary Brass – saxophones and trumpets
- Sara Watkins – violin, harmony vocals, baritone guitar, and percussion
