= I'll Be Your Girl =

Studio album by the Decemberists
- Released: March 16, 2018
- Genres: Folk rock; synth-pop
- Length: 43:06
- Labels: Capitol; Rough Trade (Europe)
- Producer: John Congleton

The Decemberists chronology
The Queen of Hearts (2017)	I'll Be Your Girl (2018)	As It Ever Was, So It Will Be Again (2024)

Singles from I'll Be Your Girl
- 1. "Severed" Released: January 17, 2018; 2. "Once in My Life" Released: March 10, 2018; 3. "Sucker's Prayer" Released: June 4, 2018

Professional ratings
Aggregate scores
Source	Rating
Metacritic	69/100
Review scores
Source	Rating
AllMusic	3.5/5 stars
Pitchfork	6.1/10
Rolling Stone	3/5 stars

I'll Be Your Girl is the eighth studio album by the American indie rock band the Decemberists, released on March 16, 2018 on Capitol and Rough Trade. Produced by John Congleton, the band experimented with new instrumentation during the album's recording sessions, including several synth-based compositions. The album was preceded by the singles "Severed" and "Once in My Life".

== Writing and composition ==
The album's lyrical content was, in part, influenced by the 2016 presidential election and its immediate aftermath. Vocalist and guitarist Colin Meloy noted: "[I'll Be Your Girl] celebrates the absurdity of our current predicaments. I think it really is a reflection of my outlook immediately post the 2016 election, where there was immediately this onset of despair. Like real despair. Real depression, and then sort of climbing out of it. Seeing other people feeling the same way, similarly climbing out of their hole and just witnessing events as they came along, rather than with tears. There was almost like an ironic humour but with anger, and those sort of go together. It was about finding the balance between real rage and humour – discovering the wild absurdity in it, but not being blithe."

Meloy cited New Order and Depeche Mode as influences on the album; Pitchfork drew additional comparisons to artists including Orchestral Manoeuvres in the Dark and R.E.M.

== Track listing ==
All tracks are written by Colin Meloy, except where noted.

No.	Title	Length
1.	"Once in My Life" (Georgia Hubley, Ira Kaplan, Meloy)	5:09
2.	"Cutting Stone"	3:20
3.	"Severed"	4:03
4.	"Starwatcher"	2:39
5.	"Tripping Along"	3:35
6.	"Your Ghost"	2:40
7.	"Everything Is Awful"	3:22
8.	"Sucker's Prayer"	3:28
9.	"We All Die Young"	4:01
10.	"Rusalka, Rusalka / Wild Rushes"	8:15
11.	"I'll Be Your Girl"	2:34
Total length:		43:06

== Personnel ==
=== The Decemberists ===
- Colin Meloy - vocals, composer, lyricist, acoustic guitar, background vocals, electric guitar
- Chris Funk - acoustic guitar, banjo, bouzouki, electric guitar, mandolin, synthesizer
- Jenny Conlee - accordion, organ, piano, synthesizer, vibraphone
- Nate Query - cello, electric bass, upright bass
- John Moen - drums, percussion

=== Additional musicians ===
- Kelly Hogan - background vocals
- Nora O'Connor - background vocals
- Birch Query - choir vocals
- Eleanor Laurie - choir vocals
- Finn Query - choir vocals
- Louise Moen - choir vocals
- Max Markewitz - choir vocals
- Mina Greenberg Motamedi - choir vocals
- Sabrina Montgomery - choir vocals
- Satchel Laurie - choir vocals
- Scout Funk - choir vocals
- Mikaela Davis - harp
- Gaelynn Lea - violin

=== Technical ===
- The Decemberists - production
- John Congleton - production, mixing, recording engineering, studio personnel
- Adam Lee - assistant mixing, assistant recording engineering, studio personnel
- Greg Calbi - studio personnel

== Charts ==
Chart (2018)	Peak position
Australian Albums (ARIA)	86
Austrian Albums (Ö3 Austria)	24
Belgian Albums (Ultratop Flanders)	133
Canadian Albums (Billboard)	34
German Albums (Offizielle Top 100)	55
Scottish Albums (Official Charts)	5
UK Albums (Official Charts)	8
US Billboard 200	9
