= Florasongs =

florasongs

EP by the Decemberists
- Released: October 9, 2015
- Genres: Indie folk, folk rock
- Length: 18:48
- Label: Capitol
- Producers: Tucker Martine and the Decemberists

The Decemberists chronology
What a Terrible World, What a Beautiful World (2015)	florasongs (2015)	The Queen of Hearts (2017)

Florasongs (stylized in lowercase caps) is an EP by the American indie rock band the Decemberists, released on October 9, 2015, on Capitol Records. The release is composed of five out-takes from their seventh studio album, What a Terrible World, What a Beautiful World.

== Reception ==
Professional ratings
Review scores
Source	Rating
AllMusic	4.5/5 stars
Pitchfork	5.8/10
PopMatters	7/10
Renowned for Sound	2.5/5 stars

Critical reception to florasongs was mixed, but mostly positive. The EP did not receive a rating from an aggregate score website, but it did garner reviews from primarily independent music criticism websites. Pitchfork's Evan Rytlewski wrote in his review, "Unlike its full-length counterpart, though, Florasongs has brevity working in its favor." Rytlewski later penned, "Florasongs never overcomes the sense that they’re selling themselves short, penning good-enough songs when they used to shoot for grand, great ones."

== Track listing ==
All songs are written and composed by Colin Meloy.

1. "Why Would I Now?" – 3:42
2. "Riverswim" – 4:53
3. "Fits & Starts" – 2:41
4. "The Harrowed and the Haunted" – 4:07
5. "Stateside" – 3:25

== Personnel ==
The Decemberists

- Jenny Conlee – piano, organ, backing vocals, Vibraphone, Accordion, production
- Chris Funk – acoustic guitar, electric guitar, banjo, bouzouki, mandolin, production
- Colin Meloy – vocals, drum programming, acoustic guitar, electric guitar, harmonica, bouzouki, tambourine, production
- John Moen – drums, backing, production
- Nate Query – bass guitar, upright bass, production

Additional musicians

- Anna Fritz – cello
- Kyleen King – viola
- Patti King – violin
- Rob Moose – violin and string arrangements
- Rachel Flotard – backing
- Kelly Hogan – backing
- Laura Veirs – backing

Production

- Carson Ellis – illustrations, lettering
- Stephen Marcussen – mastering
- Tucker Martine – engineering, mixing, production
- Greg Ornella – engineering
- Nick Steinhardt – design
