= Long Live the King (EP) =

EP by The Decemberists
- Released: November 1, 2011
- Recorded: Early 2010
- Studio: Pendarvis Farm near Portland, Oregon
- Genre: Indie folk, folk rock
- Length: 25:15
- Label: Capitol
- Producer: Tucker Martine and The Decemberists

The Decemberists chronology
iTunes Session (2011)	Long Live the King (2011)	We All Raise Our Voices to the Air (Live Songs 04.11–08.11) (2012)

Long Live the King is an EP by the American indie rock band The Decemberists, released on November 1, 2011, on Capitol. The release is composed of out-takes from their sixth studio album, The King Is Dead. The titles of both combine to create the traditional proclamation, "The king is dead, long live the king!"

== Critical reception ==
Professional ratings
Aggregate scores
Source	Rating
Metacritic	66%
Review scores
Source	Rating
AllMusic	2.5/5 stars
The A.V. Club	A−
Pitchfork	6.8/10

Critical reception to Long Live the King was positive. On Metacritic, which assigns a rating out of 100 to reviews from mainstream critics, Long Live the King received an average score of 66, based on 15 reviews, which indicates "generally favorable reviews".

== Track listing ==
All songs written by Colin Meloy, unless otherwise stated.

1. "E. Watson" – 3:32
2. "Foregone" – 4:07
3. "Burying Davy" – 4:22
4. "I4U & U4Me" (Home Demo) – 3:38
5. "Row Jimmy" (Jerry Garcia and Robert Hunter) – 6:40
6. "Sonnet" (Dante Alighieri) – 2:56

== Personnel ==
The Decemberists

- Jenny Conlee – piano, organ, backing vocals, production
- Chris Funk – pedal steel, electric guitar, production
- Colin Meloy – vocals, drum programming, acoustic guitar, electric guitar, rhythm guitar, tambourine, production
- John Moen – drums, tambourine, backing vocals, production
- Nate Query – bass guitar, upright bass, production

Additional musicians

- Victor Nash – trumpet on "Sonnet"
- Adam Schneider – trombone on "Sonnet"
- Annalisa Tornfelt – backing vocals on "E. Watson"
- Laura Veirs – backing vocals on "E. Watson"

Production

- Bijan Berahimi – design
- Autumn de Wilde – photography
- Carson Ellis – illustrations
- Jeri Heiden – design
- Stephen Marcussen – mastering
- Tucker Martine – engineering, mixing, production
