= 5 Songs (The Decemberists EP) =

EP by the Decemberists
- Released: 2001
- Recorded: Type Foundry Studio; Portland, Oregon; 2001
- Genres: Indie folk, indie rock
- Length: 23:52
- Labels: Self-released, Hush Records (2003)
- Producer: Jason Powers

the Decemberists chronology
5 Songs (2001)	Castaways and Cutouts (2002)

5 Songs is a six-track EP by the Decemberists initially self-released in 2001. It is the first record the band released. The misleading title owes to the fact that the final track, "Apology Song" (originally sung by frontman Colin Meloy into the answering machine of a friend named Steven as a legitimate apology for the loss of a beloved bicycle named Madeline), was written after the original self-produced CD was released. Meloy liked it so much that it was added to the album when it was re-released by Hush Records in 2003.

The album cover was designed by the Portland artist Carson Ellis, the long-time girlfriend (and now wife) of Meloy, who has created artwork for each of the band's albums.

== Background ==
Fresh off a creative writing degree at the University of Montana, this debut album comes after Meloy made a decision to split up with his college band Tarkio and move to Portland, Oregon to reach a wider audience in a competitive music scene. It was there when he met his bassist Nate Query, who introduced him to Jenny Conlee, a versatile artist who plays the keyboard and accordion. Meloy then met his future guitarist, Chris Funk, who was previously a fan of Meloy's college band Tarkio. Meloy needed someone who played a pedal steel for an upcoming EP he was about to do, so Funk was invited into the band. Ezra Holbrook was the other band member at the time, who contributed on the drums until his departure in 2002. Meloy and company would eventually form their band known as The Decemberists.

You can only go so far as a band out of Missoula, not to be downplaying being in a band in Missoula, but just the amount of travel to get to your nearest metro area was really time-consuming and expensive.

— Colin Meloy

== Composition ==
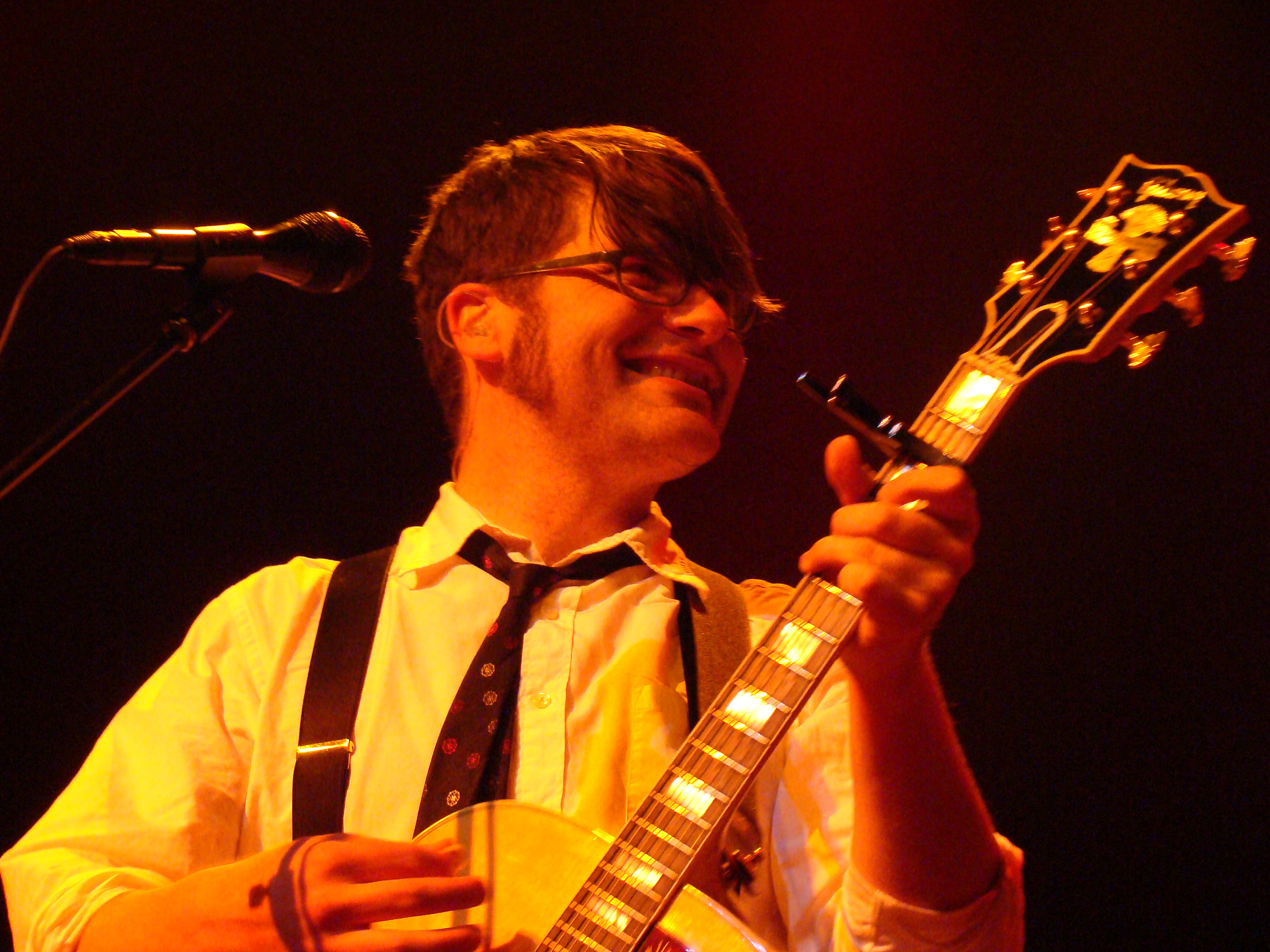
Colin Meloy, lead singer of The Decemberists

"Oceanside" appears as the first song in this track. In 2011, before performing in front of a crowd at the Greek Theatre in Griffith Park, Los Angeles, Meloy introduces the track as "a song about the ocean." The character featured in the first line of the track, "Annabelle", is a recurring name throughout Colin Meloy's singing career, first as the title of one of the tracks from his previous band, Tarkio, in the song "Annabelle Leigh" out of the album Omnibus, then again later in the song "California One/Youth and Beauty Brigade," from "Castaways and Cutouts".

The second song in the EP, "Shiny", features the narrator, who calls himself a "dull and witless boy," which is the username Meloy goes by on his blog site and Instagram.

"My Mother Was a Chinese Trapeze Artist" was originally released in a slightly more "country" version on Meloy's pre-Decemberists, Tarkio EP, Sea Songs For Landlocked Sailors, in 1999, and was re-released in 2005 on the Kill Rock Stars compilation of all Tarkio releases, Omnibus. This song marked the end of Meloy's first band Tarkio in 1999, and the beginning of his new band formed in Portland, Oregon, "The Decemberists" in 2000. Inspiration for this song came after a disastrous family vacation trip, in which Meloy wrote the lyrics with the intention to re-create his family in a bizarre setting, with him starring as the "sad anti-hero" of this song.

"Angel Won't You Call Me" is the fourth song of the EP and the shortest, sitting at two minutes and forty seconds. Meloy mentions using a polaroid camera in the song, which is a theme introduced ten years after the song's release, when The Decemberists called upon photographer and artist Autumn De Wild to document the making of the 2011 album "The King is Dead" using nothing but polaroids. Fans had the option to create their own polaroid slideshow with the 2,000 photos taken by Wilde through the official Decemberists website.

"I Don't Mind" foreshadows a common theme of death and suicide used in Decemberists songs later on in their career, but is especially attributed to Meloy's fascination with death. In the 2009 "Hazards of Love" album, a death toll was tallied up and confirmed at 70 deaths attributed to characters in the set. Meloy's fascination with death is loosely inspired by the Kossoy Sisters album "Bowling Green" which has served as his primary source for murder tales.

"Apology Song" contains several references to the town of Missoula, Montana. The "Orange Street Food Farm" is a local grocery store popular with University of Montana students (mostly for buying beer). The "Frenchtown Pond" is a reference to Frenchtown Pond State Park, located approximately 15 miles northwest of Missoula in Frenchtown, Montana. Meloy told audiences on 2 October 2007 at Royal Festival Hall how they reclaimed the bicycle years later, only for it to be crushed between cars when he was helping the true owner of the bike move house.

== Reception ==
Professional Reviews
Review scores
Source	Rating
Pitchfork TinyMixTapes AllMusic	7.3/10 4.5/5 60/100

Mixed reviews were received for the band's debut, which is apparent compared to the Decemberists later albums, which favor more imaginative lyrics and overall substance than the EP's more simplified, poppy tone than ultimately made critics listening less fulfilled for some. Others argue that the album is worth the purchase, stating that the six songs stray away from today's music and remind listeners of simpler times. The Band's first studio album, Castaways and Cutouts, attributed to the EP's mixed reception after receiving critically acclaimed reviews from magazines like Pitchfork and TinyMixTapes, and even comparisons to Neutral Milk Hotel's style of music.

== Track listing ==
All songs written by Colin Meloy.

No.	Title	Length
1.	"Oceanside"	3:29
2.	"Shiny"	5:12
3.	"My Mother Was a Chinese Trapeze Artist"	4:42
4.	"Angel, Won't You Call Me?"	2:40
5.	"I Don't Mind"	4:40
6.	"Apology Song"	3:12
Total length:		23:52
