= What a Terrible World, What a Beautiful World =

Studio album by the Decemberists
- Released: January 20, 2015
- Genres: Indie rock, folk rock, indie folk
- Length: 52:57
- Labels: Capitol (US), Rough Trade (Europe)
- Producer: Tucker Martine

The Decemberists chronology
We All Raise Our Voices to the Air (Live Songs 04.11–08.11) (2012)	What a Terrible World, What a Beautiful World (2015)	florasongs (2015)

Singles from What a Terrible World, What a Beautiful World
- 1. "Make You Better" Released: November 2014; 2. "The Wrong Year" Released: April 6, 2015

What a Terrible World, What a Beautiful World is the seventh studio album from the Decemberists, released on January 20, 2015. The album's title comes from a line in the song "12/17/12", a reference to the date of Barack Obama's speech in response to the Sandy Hook Elementary School shooting and lead singer Colin Meloy's conflicting feelings about the shooting and his happy personal life.

== Reception ==
Professional ratings
Aggregate scores
Source	Rating
AnyDecentMusic?	7.2/10
Metacritic	77/100
Review scores
Source	Rating
AllMusic	4/5 stars
The A.V. Club	B
Chicago Tribune	3/4 stars
The Daily Telegraph	4/5 stars
The Guardian	4/5 stars
Los Angeles Times	3/4 stars
Mojo	4/5 stars
Pitchfork	5.6/10
Rolling Stone	4/5 stars
Spin	7/10

=== Critical ===
What a Terrible World, What a Beautiful World received mostly positive reviews. It currently has a metascore of 77 from Metacritic. The Boston Globe described the album as one of the band's "most enjoyable and lively efforts in recent memory", The New York Times noted that What a Terrible World, What a Beautiful World "strikes a note of pop concision and maturity, building on what worked on ‘The King Is Dead.’ Lyrically, there are fewer thistles and minarets and palanquins—and, musically, less digressive excess—than once made up the Decemberists’ trademark style." Jeremy D. Larson of Pitchfork was a detractor, bemoaning the album as "overlong and under-ambitious", though appreciating that listeners "start to see Meloy himself more than ever". Larson also wrote highly of "Make You Better", stating, "The band has never lacked the musical bona fides to write a great anthem."

=== Commercial ===
The album debuted at No. 7 on the Billboard 200 albums chart on its release, selling around 50,000 copies in the United States in its first week. It also debuted at No. 2 on Billboard's Top Rock Albums, and No. 1 on the Folk Albums chart. The album has sold 123,000 copies in the United States as of October 2015.

== Track listing ==
All songs written by Colin Meloy.

No.	Title	Length
1.	"The Singer Addresses His Audience"	4:42
2.	"Cavalry Captain"	3:17
3.	"Philomena"	3:04
4.	"Make You Better"	5:07
5.	"Lake Song"	5:52
6.	"Till the Water's All Long Gone"	5:01
7.	"The Wrong Year"	3:53
8.	"Carolina Low"	3:24
9.	"Better Not Wake the Baby"	1:44
10.	"Anti-Summersong"	2:12
11.	"Easy Come, Easy Go"	2:22
12.	"Mistral"	3:54
13.	"12/17/12"	3:03
14.	"A Beginning Song"	5:22
Total length:		52:57

== Personnel ==
According to the liner notes of What a Terrible World, What a Beautiful World.

=== The Decemberists ===
- Colin Meloy – lead vocals, acoustic and electric guitars, bouzouki, harmonica, backing vocals
- Chris Funk – acoustic and electric guitars, banjo, bouzouki, mandolin
- Jenny Conlee – piano, Hammond organ, vibraphone, accordion, keyboards
- Nate Query – bass, upright bass
- John Moen – drums, percussion, backing vocals

=== Additional musicians ===
Backup singers

- Rachel Flotard (tracks 1, 2, 3, 4, 7, 11, 12, 13, 14)
- Kelly Hogan (tracks 2, 3, 9, 10, 12)
- Laura Veirs (track 5)
- Ragen Fykes (tracks 6, 8)
- Moorea Masa (tracks 6, 8)
- "The Singer Addresses His Audience" Choir: Kyleen King, Laura Veirs, Allison Hall, Bridgit Jacobson, Carson Ellis, Michael Finn, Jeremy Swatzky, Shelley Short, Steven Watkins, Ritchie Young, Moorea Masa
- The "Anti-Summersong" Narrator Support Gang: Chris Funk, Nate Query, John Moen, Jason Colton, Tucker Martine

Strings and brass

- Rob Moose – violin, fiddle
- Kyleen King – viola
- Patti King – violin
- Anna Fritz – cello
- Victor Nash – trumpet

=== Production ===
- Produced by Tucker Martine with The Decemberists
- String arrangements by Rob Moose
- Recorded and mixed by Tucker Martine
- Mastered by Stephen Marcussen
- Assistant engineering by Michael Finn
- Design by Jeri Heiden and Glen Nakasako for SMOG Design, Inc.
- Illustrations and lettering by Carson Ellis
- Photography by Autumn de Wilde

== Charts ==
=== Weekly charts ===
Chart (2015)	Peak position
Australian Albums (ARIA)	27
Belgian Albums (Ultratop Flanders)	122
Dutch Albums (Album Top 100)	27
New Zealand Albums (RMNZ)	28
Italian Albums (FIMI)	90
US Billboard 200	7
US Top Rock Albums (Billboard)	2

=== Year-end charts ===
Chart (2015)	Position
US Top Rock Albums (Billboard)	39
