= The Hazards of Love =

Studio album by the Decemberists
- Released: March 24, 2009
- Recorded: 2008
- Genres: Folk rock; progressive rock; art rock; folk metal
- Length: 58:37
- Label: Capitol/Rough Trade
- Producer: Tucker Martine

The Decemberists chronology
Live from SoHo (2007)	The Hazards of Love (2009)	The King Is Dead (2011)

Singles from The Hazards of Love
- 1. "The Rake's Song" Released: January 27, 2009

The Hazards of Love is the fifth album by the American indie rock band the Decemberists, released through Capitol Records and Rough Trade in 2009. The album was inspired by an Anne Briggs EP titled The Hazards of Love. According to the band, frontman Colin Meloy had set out to write a song with the album's title, which eventually developed into an entire album. Becky Stark (of Lavender Diamond), Shara Nova (of My Brightest Diamond), and Jim James (of My Morning Jacket) provide guest vocals throughout the album, while Robyn Hitchcock makes a cameo guitar appearance on "An Interlude".

The Hazards of Love is a concept album and rock opera, with all songs contributing to a unified narrative, similar to the use of recurring stories on the band's previous album, The Crane Wife. The plot is a love story: a woman named Margaret (voiced by Stark) falls in love with a shape-shifting boreal forest dweller named William (voiced by Meloy). William's mother, the jealous Forest Queen (voiced by Nova), and the villainous Rake (also voiced by Meloy) bring conflict to the album's story arc.

== Plot ==
While riding through the taiga, Margaret finds an injured fawn. When she stops to help it, the fawn changes into a young man named William, and the two make love ("The Hazards of Love 1 (The Prettiest Whistles Won't Wrestle the Thistles Undone)"). Margaret soon learns she is pregnant ("A Bower Scene") and flees to the forest to find William ("Won't Want for Love (Margaret in the Taiga)"). William comes to Margaret and proclaims his love for her ("The Hazards of Love 2 (Wager All)"), but a short, mysterious instrumental announces the threat of William's mother, the Forest Queen ("The Queen's Approach").

William and Margaret reminisce about their first meeting and anticipate the birth of their child ("Isn't It a Lovely Night?") when they are discovered by the Forest Queen. William begs the Queen to allow him to be with Margaret, but the Queen accuses him of being ungrateful, pointing out that she rescued him from the human world when he was a baby and bestowed on him immortality. Their exchange continues until the Queen resolves to allow William one night as a mortal man with Margaret, but afterwards reclaim him forever ("The Wanting Comes in Waves/Repaid"), ending the first act. Another short instrumental ("An Interlude") represents the "intermission" between the two acts.

Elsewhere, we meet the Rake, a widower and philanderer who feels no remorse at having murdered his three children in order to be rid of the responsibility of raising them ("The Rake's Song"). He kidnaps Margaret ("The Abduction of Margaret"), and then the Forest Queen ruthlessly breaks her promise by inviting the Rake to violate Margaret and assists his escape from William by parting a raging river ("The Queen's Rebuke/The Crossing"). William arrives at the river but is unable to cross until he offers his own life in exchange for safe passage ("Annan Water").

The Rake gloats over Margaret, while she calls for William to rescue her ("Margaret in Captivity"). But before the Rake can strike, the ghosts of his three murdered children appear and thwart him ("The Hazards of Love 3 (Revenge!)"). William arrives and escapes with Margaret ("The Wanting Comes in Waves (Reprise)"), but, as they approach the river, the lovers vow to marry each other by drowning themselves in the river while William is still a mortal man. As they sink into the water, William and Margaret proclaim their love a final time, reflecting that, in death, "the hazards of love" can no longer trouble them ("The Hazards of Love 4 (The Drowned)").

== Release history ==
On January 15, 2009, "The Rake's Song" became available as a free download on the band's MySpace page. This was followed on February 16, 2009, by "The Hazards of Love 1", again on MySpace. The Hazards of Love was released on iTunes Australia on March 14, 2009. On March 20, 2009, Entertainment Weekly began streaming the full album on imeem. The album entered the US charts at #14, selling 19,000 copies in its first week.

After the album's release, four filmmakers (Peter Sluszka, Julia Pott, Guilherme Marcondes, and Santa Maria) made an animated visual accompaniment to the music, Here Come the Waves: The Hazards of Love Visualized. It does not include narrative elements, but is related through the shape of the music. It has been shown publicly in a few locations.

In February 2012, Player's Theatre in Montreal, Canada staged the album under the name "The Hazards of Love: A Folk Opera" with dialogue written to accompany the Decemberists' original music. The script was written and directed by James Hugh Keenan Campbell and Charles Harries, and starred Montreal actors Emily Skahan, John Pleasants, and Katie Scharf among others. Robin Warner, a Montreal jazz bassist, directed the six person pit band.

== Reception ==
Professional ratings
Aggregate scores
Source	Rating
AnyDecentMusic?	7.2/10
Metacritic	73/100
Review scores
Source	Rating
AllMusic	4/5 stars
The A.V. Club	B+
The Guardian	3/5 stars
Mojo	4/5 stars
MSN Music (Consumer Guide)	C
NME	3/5 stars
Pitchfork	5.7/10
Q	4/5 stars
Rolling Stone	4/5 stars
Spin	5/10

The Hazards of Love drew mixed to favorable reviews from music critics, with most reviewers commending the album's ambition and musical craft, but criticizing its story and characters as vague and underdeveloped. Will Hermes of Rolling Stone wrote that "The Hazards of Love brings the glorious excess... The Decemberists approach this kind of pretentiousness somewhat ironically, but they also clearly love their models, Led Zeppelin and Fairport Convention among them", while James Christopher Monger of AllMusic summarized the album as "ambitious, pretentious, obtuse, often impenetrable, and altogether pretty great". Robert Christgau was a detractor, writing that "The Hazards of Love looked to be where Colin Meloy's obvious bad points permanently swallowed his subtle good points...He has the conceit to elevate melodies that are the musical equivalent of doggerel into mini-motives". Marc Hogan of Pitchfork criticized the album's plot and lamented the absence of the band's "catchy choruses" and "verisimilar emotions", but praised its heavier songs and Shara Nova's contribution to them.

== Track listing ==
All songs written by Colin Meloy, except "Prelude", written by Jenny Conlee.

No.	Title	Length
1.	"Prelude"	3:04
2.	"The Hazards of Love 1 (The Prettiest Whistles Won't Wrestle the Thistles Undone)"	4:19
3.	"A Bower Scene"	2:09
4.	"Won't Want for Love (Margaret in the Taiga)"	4:07
5.	"The Hazards of Love 2 (Wager All)"	4:25
6.	"The Queen's Approach"	0:29
7.	"Isn't It a Lovely Night?"	3:39
8.	"The Wanting Comes in Waves/Repaid"	6:26
9.	"An Interlude"	1:40
10.	"The Rake's Song"	3:16
11.	"The Abduction of Margaret"	2:07
12.	"The Queen's Rebuke/The Crossing"	3:56
13.	"Annan Water"	5:11
14.	"Margaret in Captivity"	3:08
15.	"The Hazards of Love 3 (Revenge!)"	3:22
16.	"The Wanting Comes in Waves (Reprise)"	1:31
17.	"The Hazards of Love 4 (The Drowned)"	5:57
Total length:		58:37

== Personnel ==
According to the liner notes of The Hazards of Love.

=== The Decemberists ===
- Colin Meloy – vocals (voice of William, The Rake, First Voice, Second Voice), acoustic guitar, electric guitar, percussion
- Chris Funk – electric guitar, tenor guitar, baritone guitar, pedal steel, mandolin, banjo, bouzouki, autoharp, hurdy-gurdy, hammered dulcimer, marxophone, piano, synthesizer, percussion
- Jenny Conlee – piano, harpsichord, Hammond organ, Wurlitzer, synthesizer, accordion, marxophone
- Nate Query – bass, upright bass, bowed bass, synthesizer
- John Moen – drums, hand drums, percussion, backing vocals

=== Additional musicians ===
- Becky Stark – vocals (voice of Margaret), backing vocals
- Shara Nova (credited as Shara Worden) – vocals (voice of the Forest Queen), backing vocals
- Robyn Hitchcock – electric guitar ("An Interlude")
- Jim James – backing vocals
- Rebecca Gates – backing vocals
- Keiko Araki – violin
- Greg Ewer – violin
- Adam Hoornstra – viola
- Collin Oldham – cello
- Victoria Llewellyn – vocals (voice of Charlotte)
- Clara Ell – vocals (voice of Dawn)
- Joseph Ell – vocals (voice of Isaiah)

=== Production ===
- Produced by Tucker Martine with The Decemberists
- Recorded and mixed by Tucker Martine, assisted by Rich Hipp
- Mastered by Roger Seibel
- String arrangements by Jenny Conlee and Nate Query
- Design by Carson Ellis, Colin Meloy, and Mario Hugo for Hugo & Marie
- Illustrations by Carson Ellis
- Band photo by Autumn de Wilde
