= Rachel Blumberg =

American musician, artist, and filmmaker

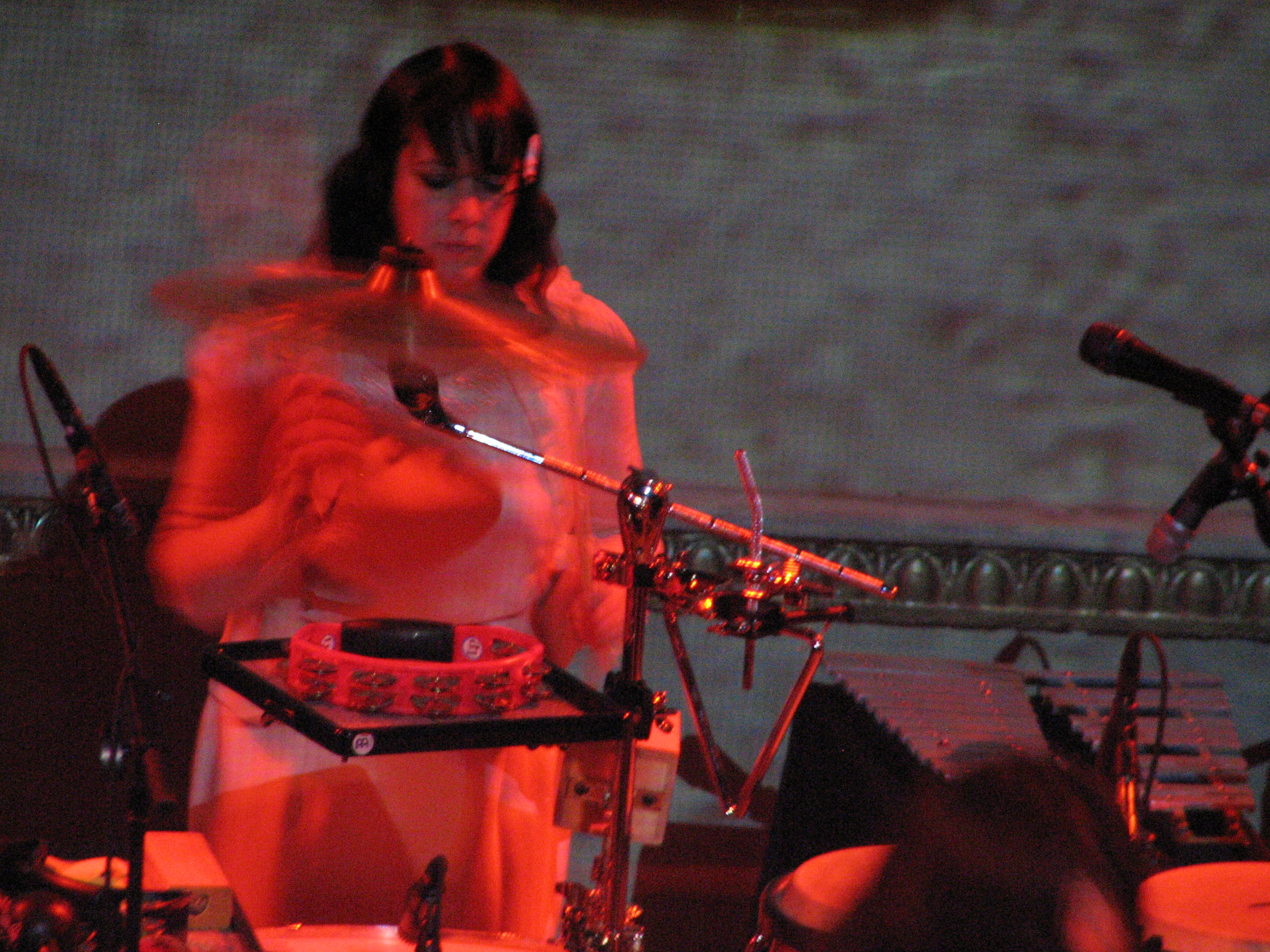
- Rachel Blumberg playing drums for Bright Eyes

Background information
- Born: February 10, 1969 (age 57); Portland, Oregon, U.S.
- Genres: Indie pop; folk rock
- Occupation: Musician
- Instruments: Drums; percussion; vocals; ukulele; banjo; accordion; piano

Rachel Chaiya Blumberg (born February 10, 1969) is an American musician, artist, and filmmaker, most notable for her tenure as the drummer for the indie rock band the Decemberists.

== Early life ==
Blumberg was born in Portland, Oregon, in 1969. She is the daughter of Naomi Blumberg, a Portland cellist and President Emerita of the Oregon Cello Society, and Bernie Blumberg, a professional musician and a public school music teacher, supervisor and principal.

== Music career ==
In addition to drumming for the Decemberists, Blumberg was a member of many Portland-based indie bands, including Sissyface, Boycrazy, Norfolk & Western, the Minders (briefly) and M. Ward's backing band.

She spent most of 2007 lending her drumming and singing talents to the touring Omaha indie band Bright Eyes on the Four Winds and Cassadaga tour. In 2007 and early 2008, she recorded new records with Norfolk & Western, M. Ward, and Jolie Holland.

Blumberg has recorded with Providence, Rhode Island, band the Low Anthem and performed with Califone, Death Vessel, and Honeybunch. She has performed her own music under the monikers Manzanita and Arch Cape.

In addition to drums and singing, she plays ukulele, banjo, accordion, piano, and other various stringed, electronic and percussion instruments.

Blumberg has taught for many years at Portland, Oregon's Rock and Roll Camp for Girls and its Girls Rock! Rhode Island offshoot.

== Filmmaking and art ==
Blumberg makes music videos using stop motion animation and a variety of other techniques including painting, collage, and puppetry. Notable videos she has directed include "Dry Town (Demo)" by Gillian Welch, and "Jules and Jim" by Nada Surf; others include songs by Musee Mechanique, Dramady, and Tom Hagerman. Blumberg says her animation style was influenced by the work of the Brothers Quay and Jan Svankmajer.

As a visual artist, she has shown her work in Portland, Oregon, and Omaha, Nebraska. Notable musicians who own her work include Gillian Welch, Jonathan Richman, Matthew Caws of Nada Surf, Jenny Conlee of the Decemberists, and Laura Veirs.

== Performing discography ==
=== Norfolk & Western ===
- Centralia (LP, FILMguerrero, 2000)
- Winter Farewell (LP, FILMguerrero, 2002)
- Dusk in Cold Parlours (LP, Hush Records, 2003)
- If You Were Born Overseas (LP, self-released, 2005)
- The Unsung Colony (LP, Hush Records, 2006)

=== Otterpop a.k.a. Bunny Summer ===
- Pollen Count (Compilation Cassette, Amacha Productions, 1992) (as Otterpop)
- Slaughter on 13th Street (Compilation Cassette, Disgraceland Productions, 1993) (as Bunny Summer)
- The One About Las Vegas (7" single, spinART Records, 1994) (recorded 1991) (as Bunny Summer)

=== Sissyface ===
- A Night at the x-Ray (Cassette, Cravedog Records, 1994)
- Damn Everything but the Circus (7", Cravedog Records, 1994)
- 4X4 Monster Truck Series (Compilation 7", Cravedog Records, 1995)
- Can't Stand the Smell (Compilation Cassette, Cravedog Records, 1995)
- Muscle Car (Split 7" with Scribble, Cravedog Records, 1995)
- With a Shower of Sparks (Compilation 7", Cavity Search Records, 1995)
- Tiger Stripes Forever (Compilation 10", Undercover Records, 1996)
- King Lighter Stealer (CD, Cravedog Records, 1996)
- Can't Stand the Smell, Vol. 2 (Compilation CD, Cravedog Records, 1996)

=== Boycrazy ===
- Last Thursday +2 (7", Magic Marker Records, 2000)
- Foreign Words (LP, Magic Marker Records, 2001)

=== The Decemberists ===
- Castaways and Cutouts (LP, Kill Rock Stars, 2002)
- Her Majesty the Decemberists (LP, Kill Rock Stars, 2003)
- The Tain (EP, Acuarela Discos, 2004)
- Billy Liar (Single, Rough Trade, 2004)
- Picaresque (LP, Kill Rock Stars, 2005)
- 16 Military Wives (Single, Rough Trade, 2005)
- Picaresqueties (EP, Kill Rock Stars, 2005)

=== M Ward ===
- Transistor Radio (LP, Merge Records, 2005)
- Post-War (LP, Merge Records, 2006)

=== Robert Deeble ===
- This Bar Has No One Left (EP, Fractured Discs, 2005)

=== Douglas Shepherd ===
- Type Foundry Sessions EP (EP, self-released, 2001)

=== Corrina Repp ===
- The Absent and the Distant (LP, Caldo Verde Records, 2006)

=== She and Him ===
- Volume One (LP, Merge Records, 2008)

=== Jolie Holland ===
- The Living and the Dead (LP, Anti, 2008)
