= Wildwood (soundtrack) =

2026 soundtrack album by Dario Marianelli

Wildwood (Original Motion Picture Soundtrack)

Soundtrack album by Dario Marianelli
- Released: October 23, 2026
- Recorded: 2022–2026
- Studios: AIR Studios, London
- Genre: Film score
- Length: 65:42
- Label: Decca
- Producer: Dario Marianelli

Dario Marianelli chronology
Paddington in Peru (2024)	Wildwood (2026)

Singles from Wildwood (Original Motion Picture Soundtrack)
- 1. "The Better Part of Bravery" Released: October 9, 2026

Wildwood (Original Motion Picture Soundtrack) is the soundtrack album to the 2026 stop-motion animated epic fantasy film Wildwood directed by Travis Knight for Laika starring Carey Mulligan, Peyton Elizabeth Lee, Jacob Tremblay, Richard E. Grant, Awkwafina, Amandla Stenberg, Tom Waits, Charlie Day, Blythe Danner, Arthur Knight, Angela Bassett and Mahershala Ali. The original score is composed by Dario Marianelli, and featured 25 tracks along with an original song "The Better Part of Bravery" performed by the Decemberists which released as a single on October 9, 2026. The soundtrack was released through Decca Records on October 23.

== Background ==
In May 2022, Dario Marianelli was announced to compose the film's musical score. It is his third score for a Laika film, following The Boxtrolls (2014) and Kubo and the Two Strings (2016), and his third collaboration with Travis Knight, following Kubo and Bumblebee (2018). Marianelli and Knight had initially discussed about the proceedings of the film's music and how the sound would be designed, during 2020–2021 with discussions happened via Zoom video conference largely owing to the COVID-19 pandemic. Afterwards, composition sessions began during early 2022. This allowed him to deeply embed the music into the film's narrative while the film was still in production.

During the earlier discussions with Knight, Marianelli stated that the creative start of the musical design was a red herring—he initially spent a complex tangent researching and recording a young boy singing folk songs about ivy, before realizing the opening sequence instead called for something much simpler. A key piano theme was developed for the score, deciphered on a single melody that matures alongside the characters and further evolves throughout the film, especially in the initial discovery of the forest to epic sequences involving flight and intense battles. To achieve this, Marianelli experimented with unique sound textures, like traditional instrumentation, orchestra, piano, brass and percussions, while also sampling and processing non-existent sounds and unique instrumental sounds to match the intense and epic action sequences.

== Release ==
The soundtrack album was released on October 23, 2026, coinciding with the film's release through Decca Records. The album featured 25 tracks of Marianelli's original score, with a new original song "The Better Part of Bravery" provided by The Decemberists, which preceded as a single on October 9. It was Decemberists' first project after As It Ever Was, So It Will Be Again (2024).

== Reception ==
Maya Philips of The New York Times stated that "composer Dario Marianelli elegantly vibe-checks the film's tonal shifts and suits the sound to the setting." Guy Lodge of Variety summarized that "Dario Marianelli's score is likewise restless and many-hued, alternately taking inspiration from whirling Celtic strings, military-tattoo percussion and jaunty acoustic instrumentation". Leigh Singer of Sight and Sound called it a "stirring score". Steve Seigh of JoBlo.com said "[Marianelli's score] add[s] regality to an already exciting atmosphere of mystery, magic, and encroaching darkness."

Tom Jorgensen of IGN wrote "All that excitement is very effectively supported by composer Dario Marianelli's score, a lively orchestral bedrock which is alternatingly lead by either folk string arrangements or more modern guitar sounds depending on the environment." Ayomikun Adekaiyero of Comic Book Resources wrote "[It is] Dario Marianelli's electrifying score that brings the movie to life from the very first scene [...] Marianelli's score completely controls the atmosphere of Wildwood. It sells the movie's few jump scares, masking the horror around the corner." Shannon Connellan of Mashable India wrote "Dario Marianelli's soaring score seals the emotional deal".

== Track listing ==
All music is composed by Dario Marianelli, except as noted.

No.	Title	Length
1.	"The Impassable Wilderness"	2:38
2.	"Meet the McKeels"	1:54
3.	"Into the Wildwood"	1:54
4.	"The Coyotes"	0:57
5.	"A Wildwood Chase"	1:31
6.	"Journey to South Wood"	1:48
7.	"Alexandra, The Dowager Governess"	2:04
8.	"Pittock Mansion"	1:13
9.	"Curtis Rides Out"	4:06
10.	"Prue on the Run"	4:13
11.	"86 Rue Thormond"	1:40
12.	"Alexei's Story"	4:48
13.	"A Flight and a Dogfight"	3:51
14.	"The Ivy's Waltz"	1:14
15.	"Here's the Thing"	2:13
16.	"Escape from the Warren"	1:28
17.	"The Deal"	2:07
18.	"Iphigenia & the Mystics"	4:05
19.	"Three Armies"	2:04
20.	"Into Battle"	3:11
21.	"ATTACK!"	2:46
22.	"The Plinth"	3:52
23.	"Victory"	1:29
24.	"Time to Go Back"	2:30
25.	"Homecoming"	1:41
26.	"The Better Part of Bravery" (performed by The Decemberists)	4:25
Total length:		65:42

== Wildwood Sessions ==
Wildwood Sessions (Music Inspired by Laika's Wildwood)

Soundtrack album by various artists
- Released: October 16, 2026
- Genres: Pop; classical; electronic
- Length: 45:35
- Label: Laika, LLC

Singles from Wildwood Sessions (Music Inspired by Laika's Wildwood)
- 1. "That's Enough For Me" Released: September 18, 2026; 2. "Nature In Me" Released: September 25, 2026

A soundtrack inspired by the film, Wildwood Sessions, was released on October 16, 2026, consisting of 14 tracks from Still Woozy, Saya Gray, Omari Jazz, Bocha, Donte Thomas, Amine, Portugal. The Man, Ringdown, Quickly, Quickly, New Constellations, Three for Silver, Ryan Oxford, Rachel Fannan, and The Decemberists. The album was preceded with "That's Enough For Me" which released on September 18, followed by "Nature In Me" which released on September 25.

No.	Title	Artist(s)	Length
1.	"Goldmine"	Still Woozy	3:25
2.	"Some Days Are Made For Rain"	Saya Gray	3:35
3.	"Nature In Me"	Omari Jazz; Bocha; Donte Thomas	2:55
4.	"Things Don't Change"	Aminé	2:27
5.	"You Can Count On Me"	Portugal. The Man	3:43
6.	"The Hill"	Ringdown	3:47
7.	"That's Enough For Me"	Quickly, Quickly	2:57
8.	"Evergreen"	New Constellations	2:57
9.	"Wildwood"	Three For Silver	4:51
10.	"Rose Parade"	Ryan Oxford	4:42
11.	"Bad Influence"	Rachel Fannan; Harlan Silverman	2:59
12.	"Anyway"	Quickly, Quickly	2:53
13.	"I Want To Be Lost"	The Decemberists	4:24
Total length:			45:35

== Personnel ==
Credits adapted from Film Music Reporter:

- Music composer and producer: Dario Marianelli
- Music supervisors: Maggie Rodford, Matt Biffa
- Assistant music supervisor: Lucy Evans
- Orchestrators: Dario Marianelli, Geoff Alexander
- Conductor: Dario Marianelli
- Recording and mixing studio: AIR Studios
- Recording and mixing engineer: Nick Wollage
- Score recordist: Wil Jones
- Assistant engineers: Adam Magson, Joey Rice, Ronan Murhy
- Trainee recording assistance: Oscar Rice
- Music editor: Mark Willsher
- Additional music editor: Darryl O'Donovan
- Music programmer: Jody Jenkins
- Music copyist: Colin Rae
- Musicians contractor: Hilary Skewes & Sophie Proctor at Hilary Skewes & Co
- Orchestra leader: Jack Liebeck
- Choir: London Voices
- Choir master: Ben Parry
- Music service provider: Air-Edel Associated Ltd

Featured soloists

- Fiddle: Jack Liebeck
- Nyckelharpa: Vicki Swan
- Citole: Jonny Dyer
- Viola da Gamba: Sam Ng
- Recorder: Karen Jones
- Guitar: Roshan Gunga

== Chart performance ==
Chart performance for Wildwood (Original Motion Picture Soundtrack)
Chart (2026)	Peak position
UK Classical Albums (Official Charts)	12

== Accolades ==
Award	Date of ceremony	Category	Nominee(s)	Result	Ref.
Hollywood Music in Media Awards	November 18, 2026	Best Original Score – Animated Film	Dario Marianelli	Pending	
Hollywood Music in Media Awards	November 18, 2026	Best Original Song – Animated Film	"The Better Part of Bravery" – Colin Meloy	Pending	
