= The King Is Dead (album) =

Studio album by the Decemberists
- Released: January 14, 2011
- Recorded: Early 2010
- Studios: Pendarvis Farm, near Portland, Oregon
- Genres: Indie folk, jangle pop, folk rock, Americana
- Length: 40:26
- Labels: Capitol and Rough Trade
- Producer: Tucker Martine

The Decemberists chronology
The Hazards of Love (2009)	The King Is Dead (2011)	Live at Bull Moose (2011)

Singles from The King Is Dead
- 1. "Down by the Water" Released: November 2010; 2. "This Is Why We Fight" Released: January 25, 2011; 3. "Calamity Song" Released: 2011

The King Is Dead is the sixth studio album by the Decemberists, released on Capitol Records on January 14, 2011. Described as the "most pastoral, rustic record they've ever made" by Douglas Wolk of Rolling Stone, the album reached No. 1 on the U.S. Billboard 200 chart for the week ending February 5, 2011. The song "This Is Why We Fight" reached number 19 on the U.S. Alternative Songs Chart, while the song "Down by the Water" also charted in the United States. In November 2011, the band released an EP of album out-takes, titled Long Live the King.

Prior to the album's release, frontman Colin Meloy stated: "If there's anything academic about this record, or me trying to force myself in a direction, it was realising that the last three records were really influenced by the British folk revival [...] this whole world that I was discovering, that I was poring over, learning inside-out. It was a wanting to get away from that. And looking back into more American traditions, reconnecting with more American music."

== Background ==
The King Is Dead was recorded during spring 2010, with most of it being made in a six-week period in a barn at an 80-acre (320,000 m^{2}) site called Pendarvis Farm, near Portland, Oregon. It has been speculated that the album title is an homage to The Smiths' 1986 album The Queen Is Dead, largely due to Colin Meloy's long-touted influence from the band. It was co-produced by Tucker Martine. “The Calamity Song” premiered in a live performance on August 6, 2009, at the Cabaret Metro in Chicago. At least three of the ten songs—"Down by the Water", "Rise to Me" and "June Hymn"—were performed live in 2010. Meloy has said that a primary musical influence for much of The King Is Dead is R.E.M., and three songs, "Don't Carry It All", "Calamity Song" and "Down by the Water", feature the R.E.M. guitarist Peter Buck. The album was released on January 18, 2011. The King Is Dead has been called the "most pastoral, rustic record they've ever made" by Douglas Wolk of Rolling Stone. On January 26, 2011, it became their first No. 1 album on the U.S. album chart.

On November 1, 2011, the outtakes EP Long Live the King was released, collecting six songs recorded during these sessions.

== Release and reception ==
Professional ratings
Aggregate scores
Source	Rating
AnyDecentMusic?	7.3/10
Metacritic	77/100
Review scores
Source	Rating
AllMusic	3.5/5 stars
The A.V. Club	A
The Daily Telegraph	4.5/5 stars
Entertainment Weekly	A−
The Guardian	4/5 stars
The Independent	4/5 stars
NME	4/10
Pitchfork	7.2/10
Rolling Stone	4/5 stars
Spin	7/10

The King Is Dead debuted atop the Billboard 200 and sold 94,000 copies in its first week, making it the band's most commercially successful album.

The album received positive reviews from critics. It received a 77 out of 100 on Metacritic, indicating "generally favorable reviews". Uncut placed the album at number 26 on its list of "Top 50 albums of 2011", while Rolling Stone ranked the album the 7th best of 2011.

== Track listing ==
All tracks are written by Colin Meloy.

No.	Title	Length
1.	"Don't Carry It All"	4:17
2.	"Calamity Song"	3:50
3.	"Rise to Me"	4:59
4.	"Rox in the Box"	3:10
5.	"January Hymn"	3:14
6.	"Down by the Water"	3:42
7.	"All Arise!"	3:10
8.	"June Hymn"	3:58
9.	"This Is Why We Fight"	5:30
10.	"Dear Avery"	4:52
Total length:		40:26

== Personnel ==
According to the liner notes of The King Is Dead.

=== The Decemberists ===
- Colin Meloy – vocals, acoustic guitar, 12-string guitar, baritone guitar, tenor guitar, harmonica, pump organ, percussion
- Chris Funk – pedal steel, electric guitar, banjo, bouzouki
- Jenny Conlee – piano, organ, accordion, Wurlitzer
- Nate Query – bass guitar, cello
- John Moen – drums, tambourine, shaker, percussion, backing vocals

=== Additional musicians ===
- Peter Buck – mandolin on "Don't Carry It All", 12-string electric guitar on "Calamity Song", electric guitar and baritone guitar on "Down by the Water"
- David Rawlings – backing vocals on "Don't Carry It All", "June Hymn" and "Dear Avery"
- Gillian Welch – backing vocals on "Don't Carry It All", "Rise to Me", "Rox in the Box", "Down by the Water", "All Arise!", "June Hymn" and "Dear Avery"
- Laura Veirs – backing vocals on "Dear Avery"
- Annalisa Tornfelt – violin on "Don't Carry It All", "Rox in the Box" and "All Arise!"
- Tucker Martine – tambourine on "Calamity Song"

=== Production ===
- Produced by Tucker Martine with The Decemberists
- Recorded and mixed by Tucker Martine
- Mastered by Stephen Marcussen
- Assistant engineering by Rich Hipp and Clinton Welander
- Studio Interning by Andy Schichter
- Design by Jeri Heiden for SMOG Design, Inc.
- Illustrations and lettering by Carson Ellis
- Photography by Autumn de Wilde

== Charts ==
=== Weekly charts ===
Chart (2011)	Peak position
Australian Albums (ARIA)	26
Austrian Albums (Ö3 Austria)	52
Belgian Albums (Ultratop Wallonia)	86
Canadian Albums (Billboard)	4
Dutch Albums (Album Top 100)	37
German Albums (Offizielle Top 100)	41
Irish Albums (IRMA)	30
New Zealand Albums (RMNZ)	30
Norwegian Albums (VG-lista)	18
Scottish Albums (Official Charts)	22
Swedish Albums (Sverigetopplistan)	23
Swiss Albums (Schweizer Hitparade)	58
UK Albums (Official Charts)	24
US Billboard 200	1
US Top Rock Albums (Billboard)	1

=== Year-end charts ===
Chart (2011)	Position
US Billboard 200	117
US Top Rock Albums (Billboard)	17

== Certifications ==
Certifications for The King Is Dead
Region	Certification	Certified units/sales
United States (RIAA)	Gold	500,000^{‡}
^{‡} Sales+streaming figures based on certification alone.

== Release history ==
Country	Date	Label	Format	Catalog
United States	January 14, 2011	Capitol Records	Vinyl LP	42727
United Kingdom	January 17, 2011	Rough Trade Records, Capitol Records	Compact Disc	RTRADCDX656
United States	January 18, 2011	Capitol Records	Compact Disc	50999 9 47547 2 8
