= As It Ever Was, So It Will Be Again =

Studio album by the Decemberists
- Released: June 14, 2024
- Studio: Flora Recording & Playback (Portland)
- Length: 67:39
- Label: YABB
- Producers: The Decemberists; Tucker Martine

The Decemberists chronology
I'll Be Your Girl (2018)	As It Ever Was, So It Will Be Again (2024)

As It Ever Was, So It Will Be Again is the ninth studio album by the American indie rock band the Decemberists, it was released on June 14, 2024, on YABB Records. It is a double album, produced by Tucker Martine, who the band has frequently collaborated with.

== Reception ==
Professional ratings
Aggregate scores
Source	Rating
Metacritic	76/100
Review scores
Source	Rating
AllMusic	3.5/5 stars
Paste	8.0/10
Pitchfork	7.2/10

On review aggregator Metacritic, the album received an average score of 76 out of 100 from 14 reviews, indicating "generally favorable reviews".

Stephen M. Deusner of Pitchfork noted the album was something of a "return to form", tying the focus and subject matter of the album to Meloy's "obsessions".

Eric R. Danton of Paste similarly notes the band "returning to a previous musical approach" while calling the album "fresh".

Timothy Monger of AllMusic notes the anthology-like quality suggesting the album "plays like a musical overview of their career".

Chris DeVille of Stereogum described the 19-minute finale "Joan in the Garden", inspired by Joan of Arc, as a "slow burn". He highlights "unexpectedly sick ambient noise" and "monster riffs" in the song.

== Track listing ==
All tracks are written by Colin Meloy.

No.	Title	Length
1.	"Burial Ground"	4:04
2.	"Oh No!"	5:04
3.	"The Reapers"	4:41
4.	"Long White Veil"	3:49
5.	"William Fitzwilliam"	3:35
6.	"Don't Go to the Woods"	3:57
7.	"The Black Maria"	3:50
8.	"All I Want Is You"	2:38
9.	"Born to the Morning"	3:24
10.	"America Made Me"	5:20
11.	"Tell Me What's on Your Mind"	3:57
12.	"Never Satisfied"	4:00
13.	"Joan in the Garden"	19:20
Total length:		67:39

== Formats ==
As It Ever Was, So It Will Be Again was released on CD, LP, cassette tape, and digital downloads.

== Personnel ==
=== The Decemberists ===
- Colin Meloy — lead vocals, acoustic guitars, electric guitars, production
- Chris Funk — electric guitars, pedal steel, synthesizers, banjo, mandolin, production
- Jenny Conlee — piano, organs, vibraphone, accordion, synthesizers, production
- Nate Query — electric bass, upright bass, production
- John Moen — drums, percussion, production

=== Additional contributors ===
- Tucker Martine — production, recording, mixing
- Emily Lazar — mastering
- Ryan Bridenstine — recording assistance, mixing assistance
- Elizabeth Ellison — backing vocals
- James Mercer — backing vocals on "Burial Ground"
- Mike Mills — backing vocals and piano on "Joan in the Garden"
- Kelly Pratt — trumpet on "Burial Ground", "Oh No!", and "America Made Me"; flugelhorn on "Burial Ground" and "All I Want Is You"; euphonium on "Burial Ground"; tuba and saxophones on "Oh No!" and "America Made Me"; trombone on "The Black Maria"; French horn on "All I Want Is You"
- Jesse Chandler — flute and bass clarinet on "The Reapers"
- Miguel Bernal — percussion on "Oh No!"
- Reinhardt Wolfgang Melz — percussion on "Oh No!"
- Carson Ellis — illustrations, art direction
- Thunderwing — art direction, design
