= ITunes Session (The Decemberists EP) =

iTunes Session

EP by the Decemberists
- Released: August 2, 2011
- Genre: Indie folk

The Decemberists chronology
Live at Bull Moose (2011)	''iTunes Session'' (2011)	Long Live the King (2011)

Professional ratings
Review scores
Source	Rating
AllMusic	3/5 stars
Beats per Minute	80%
Pitchfork	6.2/10
PopMatters	5/10 discs
Rolling Stone	3.5/5 stars

iTunes Session is an EP by the Decemberists, released on August 2, 2011. The EP was recorded in a Los Angeles studio, and contains six new versions of tracks from previous Decemberists albums, as well as two tracks covering other artists, neither of which are available elsewhere.

== Track listing ==
All songs written by Colin Meloy, unless otherwise stated.

1. "Calamity Song" — 3:42
2. "Hey, That's No Way to Say Goodbye" (Leonard Cohen) — 3:55
3. "Shankill Butchers" — 4:10
4. "June Hymn" — 4:15
5. "This Is Why We Fight" — 4:28
6. "Shiny" — 5:12
7. "The Hazards of Love 4 (The Drowned)" — 5:53
8. "When U Love Somebody" (Fruit Bats) — 3:10
