= Castaways and Cutouts =

Studio album by the Decemberists
- Released: May 21, 2002
- Recorded: January – February 2002
- Genres: Indie rock, indie folk
- Length: 49:59
- Label: Hush
- Producer: The Decemberists

The Decemberists chronology
5 Songs (2001)	Castaways and Cutouts (2002)	Her Majesty the Decemberists (2003)

Castaways and Cutouts is the first full-length album by the Decemberists, originally released on May 21, 2002, on Hush Records and reissued on May 6, 2003, on Kill Rock Stars. The album's title is taken from a lyric of the song "California One/Youth and Beauty Brigade".

The album cover was designed by the Portland artist Carson Ellis, the long-time girlfriend (now wife) of frontman Colin Meloy. She has created artwork for each of the band's albums.

== Reception ==
Professional ratings
Review scores
Source	Rating
AllMusic	4/5 stars
The Boston Phoenix	3.5/4 stars
Pitchfork	8.1/10
Tiny Mix Tapes	5/5

Castaways and Cutouts received mostly positive reviews. The album ranked number 89 on Under the Radar's Top 200 Albums of the 2000s and number 96 on Pitchfork's The 100 Best Albums of 2000–2004.

== Track listing ==
All songs written by Colin Meloy.

No.	Title	Length
1.	"Leslie Anne Levine"	4:13
2.	"Here I Dreamt I Was an Architect"	4:29
3.	"July, July!"	2:53
4.	"A Cautionary Song"	3:09
5.	"Odalisque"	5:21
6.	"Cocoon"	6:49
7.	"Grace Cathedral Hill"	4:29
8.	"The Legionnaire's Lament"	4:45
9.	"Clementine"	4:07
10.	"California One/Youth and Beauty Brigade"	9:51
Total length:		49:59

== Personnel ==
According to the liner notes of Castaways and Cutouts.

- Colin Meloy – vocals, guitar, percussion
- Chris Funk – guitar, pedal steel, theremin
- Jenny Conlee – Hammond organ, piano, Rhodes piano, accordion
- Nate Query – upright bass
- Ezra Holbrook – drums, percussion, vocals

=== Production ===
- Produced by The Decemberists
- Recorded by Simon Widdowson
- Mastered by Ryan Foster
- Design by Third Eyebrow (.com)
- Art direction by Colin Meloy and Carson Ellis
- Cover painting and illustrations by Carson Ellis
- Inner-tray photo by Jonathan Gitelson
- Sound clip in "California One/Youth and Beauty Brigade" from Archangel, directed by Guy Maddin.
