= Her Majesty the Decemberists =

Studio album by the Decemberists
- Released: September 9, 2003
- Recorded: February 2003 – March 2003
- Genres: Indie pop; folk-pop; symphonic pop
- Length: 48:26
- Label: Kill Rock Stars
- Producer: Larry Crane

The Decemberists chronology
Castaways and Cutouts (2002)	Her Majesty the Decemberists (2003)	The Tain (2004)

Singles from Her Majesty the Decemberists
- 1. "Billy Liar" Released: September 14, 2004

Professional ratings
Aggregate scores
Source	Rating
Metacritic	83/100
Review scores
Source	Rating
AllMusic	4/5 stars
Alternative Press	5/5
Blender	2/5 stars
Pitchfork	8.2/10
Stylus Magazine	B+
Uncut	3/5 stars

Her Majesty the Decemberists is the second full-length album by the Decemberists, released on September 9, 2003, by Kill Rock Stars. The song "Song for Myla Goldberg" was written years earlier, after Colin Meloy had been a media escort for the novelist Myla Goldberg during a tour following the publication of her first book, Bee Season.

The album cover was designed by the Portland artist Carson Ellis, the long-time girlfriend (later wife) of Meloy, who has created artwork for each of the band's albums.

As of November 2005 it had sold 40,000 copies in United States.

== Track listing ==
All songs written by Colin Meloy.

No.	Title	Length
1.	"Shanty for the Arethusa"	5:38
2.	"Billy Liar"	4:08
3.	"Los Angeles, I'm Yours"	4:18
4.	"The Gymnast, High Above the Ground"	7:13
5.	"The Bachelor and the Bride"	4:13
6.	"Song for Myla Goldberg"	3:34
7.	"The Soldiering Life"	3:48
8.	"Red Right Ankle"	3:29
9.	"The Chimbley Sweep"	2:54
10.	"I Was Meant for the Stage"	7:02
11.	"As I Rise"	2:14
Total length:		48:26

Note: On some editions, the track listing printed on the actual disc omits "The Chimbley Sweep", though the song is listed on the back of the CD jacket and in the liner notes.

== Personnel ==
According to the liner notes of Her Majesty the Decemberists.

=== The Decemberists ===
- Colin Meloy – vocals, acoustic guitar, electric guitar, percussion
- Chris Funk – electric guitar, Oberheim synthesizer, pedal steel, lap steel, dobro, percussion
- Jenny Conlee – Hammond organ, piano, Rhodes piano, accordion, Wurlitzer, backing vocals, percussion
- Jesse Emerson – electric bass, upright bass, percussion
- Rachel Blumberg – drums, percussion, vibes, glockenspiel, backing vocals, organ solo on "Red Right Ankle"

=== Additional musicians ===
- Cory Gray – trumpet, trombone, hand claps
- Dave Lipkind – chromatic harmonica
- Carson Ellis – Blood-curdling scream
- Kenneth Erlick – Hand claps

Her Majesty's String Quartet

- Bridget Callahan – viola
- Mike Lah – cello
- Lucia Atkinson – violin
- Emily Cox – violin

=== Production ===
- Produced by The Decemberists with Larry Crane and Adam Selzer
- Engineered by Larry Crane (tracks 2–6, 8, 10) and Adam Selzer (tracks 1, 7, 9, 11)
- Mastered by John Golden
- String arrangements by Mike Johnson
- Illustrations and design by Carson Ellis, assisted by Colin Meloy
- Layout and production by Brady Clark
