= New Constellations =

American dream pop band

New Constellations is an American dream pop and synthwave duo based out of Portland, Oregon.

== History ==
New Constellations was founded by childhood friends Harlee Case and Josh Smith. The pair had initially met in church when they were teenagers, which lead to Smith recording Case's first song for her in his childhood bedroom. After graduating high school, they each pursued music separately while supporting themselves in other lines of work. The pair did not reunite until 2015, when Case put out a note on her Instagram looking for collaborators to form a band. Smith responded to the ad and the two soon began making music together again. For the next three years, they met up in their spare time to work on music and wrote their first song together in 2018.

New Constellations released their debut single "Hot Blooded" on January 1, 2021. An accompanying music video for the song directed by Travis Abels was released on September 15, 2022. By the summer of 2025, the song had reached over 120 million streams on Spotify and the music video had over 10 million views on YouTube.

The group released an EP titled Lean In in 2023. By November 2024, they were joined by longtime friend Kyle Farook, who performed various instrumental parts when the group was on tour in the West Coast. Their first album It Comes in Waves was released on May 15, 2026, which marked the duo's ninth anniversary performing as New Constellations.

== Members ==
=== Current members ===
- Harlee Case (lead vocals) 2017-present
- Josh Smith (guitar, bass synthesizer, drum tracks) 2017-present

=== Touring members ===
- Kyle Farook (various) 2022-2024

=== Manager ===
- Steve Feinberg

== Reception ==
Jamie Ludwig of the Chicago Reader described their sound as "shimmering dance pop influenced by 80s synth bands and R&B, and they sometimes shake up their approachable, easygoing vibes with moodier, more experimental sounds." She added, "The band caught lightning in a bottle with their 2021 debut single, 'Hot Blooded,' a serene 80s-flavored synth-pop tune that showcases Case's expressive, full-throated vocals."
