= The Queen of Hearts (album) =

Studio album by Offa Rex
- Released: July 14, 2017
- Genres: Folk, British folk rock
- Length: 48:38
- Label: Nonesuch Records

Olivia Chaney chronology
Folk Songs (2017)	The Queen of Hearts (2017)	Shelter (2018)

The Decemberists chronology
florasongs (2015)	The Queen of Hearts (2017)	I'll Be Your Girl (2018)

Professional ratings
Aggregate scores
Source	Rating
Metacritic	81/100
Review scores
Source	Rating
AllMusic	4/5 stars
Exclaim!	9/10
The Guardian	4/5
Paste	7.8/10

The Queen of Hearts is a collaborative studio album by English musician Olivia Chaney and American band The Decemberists, under their project name Offa Rex. It was released in July 2017 under Nonesuch Records.

The album was nominated for Best Folk Album at the 60th Annual Grammy Awards in 2018.

== Track listing ==
No.	Title	Length
1.	"The Queen of Hearts"	3:55
2.	"Blackleg Miner"	2:22
3.	"The Gardener"	4:59
4.	"The First Time Ever I Saw Your Face"	3:31
5.	"Flash Company"	4:14
6.	"The Old Churchyard"	4:07
7.	"Constant Billy / I'll Go Enlist"	1:56
8.	"Willie O' Winsbury"	7:30
9.	"Bonny May"	6:31
10.	"Sheepcrook And Black Dog"	4:34
11.	"To Make You Stay"	4:59

== Personnel ==
- Olivia Chaney - lead vocals, backing vocals, vocals, harmonium, electric harpsichord, piano, steel-string acoustic guitar, dobro, arranger
- Colin Meloy - lead vocals, backing vocals, steel-string acoustic guitar, 12-string guitar, electric guitar, classical guitar, arranger
- Chris Funk - electric guitar, mandolin, autoharp, hammered dulcimer, arranger
- Jenny Conlee - electric piano, Hammond organ, accordion, arranger
- Nate Query - electric bass guitar, double bass, arranger
- Ralph Carney - bass clarinet, woodwind drone
- Anna Fritz - cello
- Mirabai Peart - viola, backing vocals
- John Moen - drum set, gong, arranger
- Steve Drizos - congas
- June Tabor - arranger

== Charts ==
Chart	Peak position
US Americana/Folk Albums (Billboard)	12
