= Olivia Chaney =

English musician

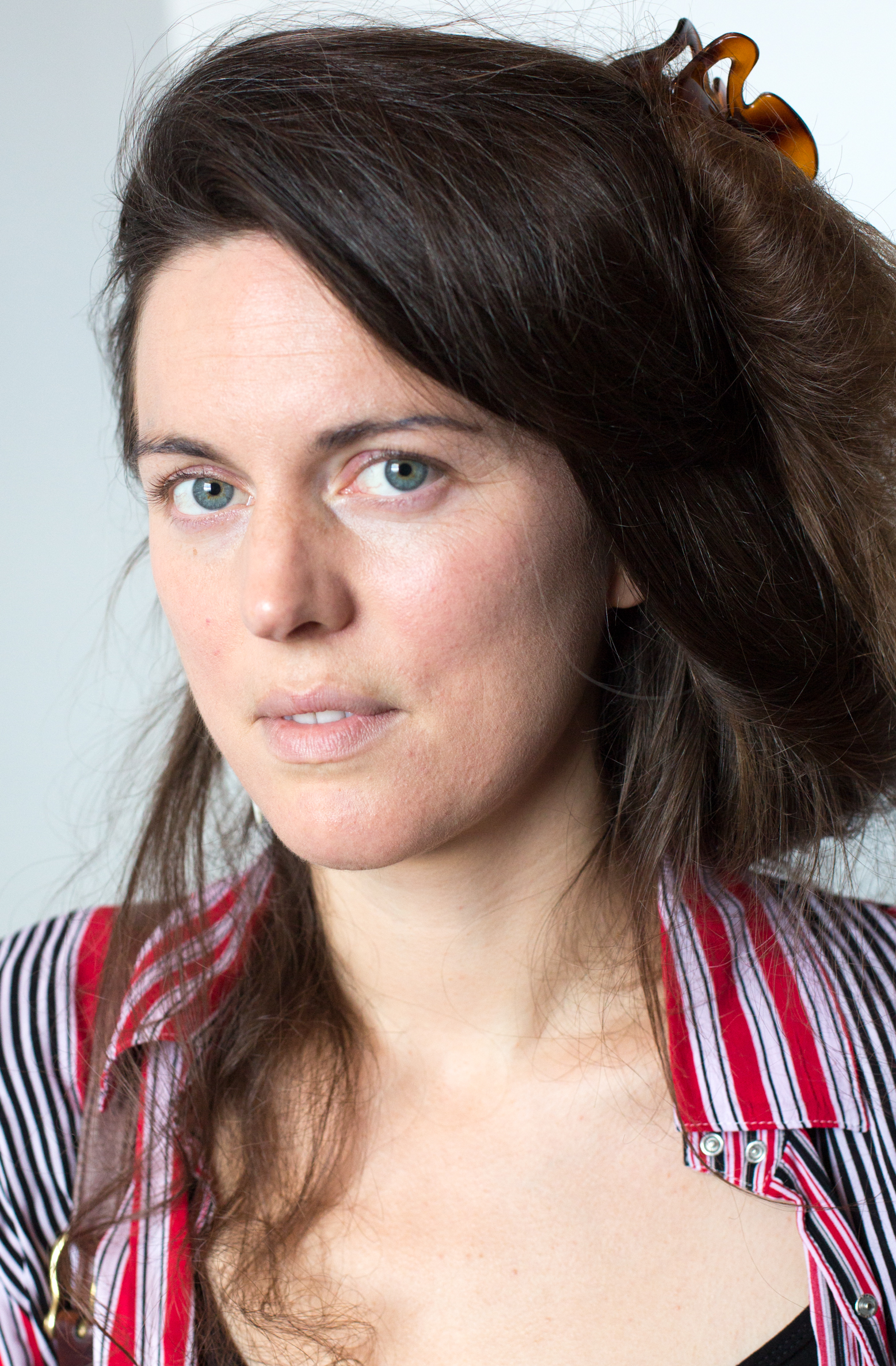
- Olivia Chaney in October 2013

Background information
- Born: 1982 (age 43–44); Florence, Italy
- Genres: Folk
- Occupations: Singer-songwriter, musician
- Instruments: Vocals, piano, guitar, harmonium
- Years active: 2004–present
- Label: Nonesuch Records
- Website: www.oliviachaney.net

Olivia Chaney (born 1982) is an English folk singer, pianist, guitarist, harmonium player and songwriter. Her first two solo albums, The Longest River (2015), and Shelter (2018) were released on Nonesuch Records. She recorded Offa Rex with The Decemberists in 2017 and released her third solo record Circus of Desire on Kartel in 2024. Chaney's setting of the folk song Dark Eyed Sailor features prominently in Emerald Fennell's film Wuthering Heights.

== Biography ==
Olivia Chaney was born in Florence, Italy, and grew up in Oxford, England, studying composition, piano and voice. Early influences include her father's record collections and his own renditions of early blues and '60s folk songwriters such as Bob Dylan, Fairport Convention and Bert Jansch.

At 14, Chaney won a joint-first piano and voice scholarship to Chetham's School of Music in Manchester, which was focused on the classical repertoire. She went on to attend the Royal Academy of Music in London, also on scholarship, where, as an improviser and songwriter, she studied in the jazz course. While at the academy, Chaney spent much of her time experimenting and collaborating outside the traditional jazz course.

== Career ==
On graduating from the academy, Chaney taught herself guitar and Indian harmonium, and began performing regularly as a soloist. She has also worked as an actress and singer/multi-instrumentalist at Shakespeare's Globe Theatre in Matthew Dunster's acclaimed production of Troilus and Cressida, and Lucy Bailey and Django Bates' production of Timon of Athens. Chaney has collaborated and shared stages all over the world with artists, composers, producers and bands including Robert Plant, The Decemberists, Kronos Quartet, Zero 7, Alasdair Roberts, Concerto Caledonia and The Labèque Sisters.

In 2010, Chaney recorded a self-released EP. In 2011, she contributed to two compilations for grassroots label Folk Police. She also performed on the live release Revenge of the Folksingers with Scottish artist Alasdair Roberts and period performance group Concerto Caledonia on the Delphian label. Chaney has performed with the Balearic Folk Orchestra, for whom she sang, arranged and played harmonium and piano on the group's Amy Winehouse cover, "He Can Only Hold Her", for a Q Magazine tribute. She featured in Alasdair Roberts's 2013 album A Working Wonder Stone.

In November 2013, Olivia Chaney was nominated for two BBC Radio 2 Folk Awards: the Horizon Award and Best Original Song, for "Swimming in the Longest River", which is featured on her self-released eponymous EP. At the same time, it was announced that Chaney had signed a record deal with Nonesuch Records.

Chaney's debut album, The Longest River, was released on Nonesuch Records on 28 April 2015. This release, which The Guardian hailed as "an enchanting and stately creation", was noted in a number of 'Best of 2015' lists (including Uncut, Mojo and PopMatters). The Independent featured it in their Top 5 Albums of the Year, calling it "a landmark release".

In 2017, Chaney was featured singing two songs on Folk Songs, an album with Kronos Quartet, and collaborated with American indie-folk band The Decemberists to release The Queen of Hearts, a joint album of reworked folk tracks under the name Offa Rex. In December 2017, it was announced that their collaborative record had been nominated for a Grammy Award by the Recording Academy for Best Folk Album.

Olivia Chaney released a new solo album, Shelter, on Nonesuch Records on 15 June 2018. The album, which was produced by Thomas Bartlett, includes original songs that Chaney wrote in her family cottage in the hills of the North York Moors, as well as her performance of "Long Time Gone," written by Frank Harford and Tex Ritter and first recorded by The Everly Brothers, and Henry Purcell's "O Solitude."

In July 2019, Olivia Chaney was nominated as BBC Radio 2 Folk Awards' Folk Singer of The Year.

On 30 September 2019, Chaney was invited to play at Richard Thompson's 70th Birthday Celebration at the Royal Albert Hall in London. She sang Sandy Denny's song "Who Knows Where the Time Goes" and her own "House on the Hill."

Circus of Desire, released in March 2024, is Chaney's third studio album, put together over five years. It was recorded in New York City with producer Thomas Bartlett.

Chaney's setting of the folk song Dark Eyed Sailor features prominently in Emerald Fennell's film Wuthering Heights (2026).

== Discography ==
- EP (2010)
- Hearts & Minds (with Seth Lakeman; Virgin Records, 2010)
- The Oak, Ash and Thorn Project (Folk Police, 2011)
- The Woodbine & Ivy Band (Folk Police, 2011)
- Revenge of the Folksingers (with Concerto Caledonia; Delphian, 2011)
- The Future (with Rodney P; Low Life Records, 2004)
- A Wonder Working Stone (with Alasdair Roberts & Friends; Drag City, 2013)
- Fain (with Wolf People; Jagjaguwar, 2013)
- The Longest River (Nonesuch Records, 2015)
- Folk Songs (with Kronos Quartet; Nonesuch Records, 2017)
- The Queen of Hearts (as Offa Rex with The Decemberists; Nonesuch Records, 2017)
- Shelter (Nonesuch Records, 2018)
- Six French Songs (Kartel Records, 2023)
- Circus of Desire (Kartel Records, March 2024)
