= Down by the Water (The Decemberists song) =

Single by The Decemberists

from the album The King is Dead
- Released: November 2010
- Recorded: 2010
- Genre: Folk rock
- Length: 3:42
- Label: Capitol
- Songwriter(s): The Decemberists, Colin Meloy

The Decemberists singles chronology
| "The Rake's Song" (2009) | "Down by the Water" (2010) | "January Hymn" (2010) |

Down by the Water is a song on the American indie rock band The Decemberists' sixth album, The King is Dead. It was released as a single in 2010.

== Lyrics and music ==
"Down By the Water" includes Peter Buck and singer-songwriter Gillian Welch, who contribute 12-string guitar and vocal harmonies, respectively. It also features accordion riffs and heavy harmonica reminiscent of Neil Young; particularly the song "Heart of Gold". "Down By the Water" has been compared to the music of Bruce Springsteen. It was featured for free download on November 2, 2010, on their official website. Meloy has said that The King Is Dead is more straightforward and heavily influenced by R.E.M., and "Down By the Water" is a prime example. Meloy himself has said that the song "started out as more of a paean to R.E.M. than I think any of us really wanted it to be".

Lyrically, "Down By the Water" is vaguely mournful. It has been described as "folksy", "uptempo", and "country-esque", and the chorus as "booming". Though "Down By the Water" has been called "catchy" and radio-friendly, it is also said to lack the quality of prose found on earlier Decemberists' work.

== Release and reception ==
The song reached number 33 on the U.S. Rock songs chart. It was favorably reviewed by critics. NPR considered it one of the top 100 songs of 2011. It was ranked the 97th best song of the year by Pazz and Jop. The song was nominated for both Best Rock Performance and Best Rock Song at the 54th Grammy Awards.

== Chart performance ==
| Chart (2010) | Peak position |
|---|---|
| U.S. Adult album alternative | 2 |
| U.S. Rock songs | 33 |
| Japan Hot 100 | 35 |
