= The Decemberists =

American indie rock band

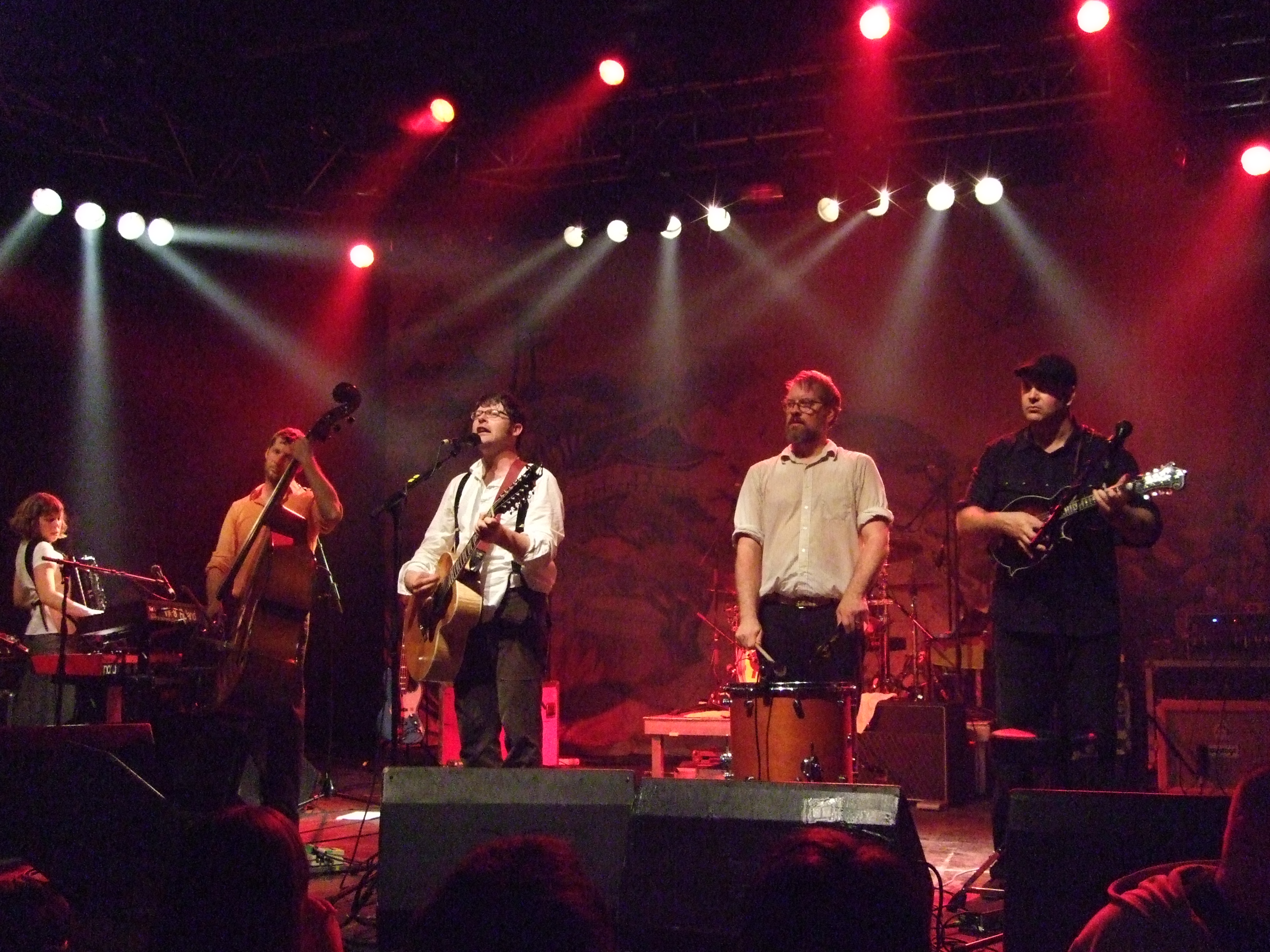
- The Decemberists playing Mariner's Revenge Song live in Vienna, 2007

Background information
- Origin: Portland, Oregon, U.S.
- Genres: Indie rock, indie folk, indie pop
- Years active: 2000–present
- Labels: Kill Rock Stars; Capitol; Hush
- Members: Colin Meloy; Chris Funk; Jenny Conlee; Nate Query; John Moen
- Past members: Jesse Emerson; Ezra Holbrook; Rachel Blumberg; Petra Haden
- Website: Decemberists.com

The Decemberists are an American indie rock band from Portland, Oregon, formed in 2000. The band consists of Colin Meloy (lead vocals, guitar), Chris Funk (guitar, multi-instrumentalist), Jenny Conlee (piano, keyboards, accordion, backing vocals), Nate Query (bass), and John Moen (drums).

As of 2024, the band has released nine studio albums with their lyrics often focusing on historical incidents and folklore. Audience participation is a part of their live performances, typically during encores. The band stages whimsical reenactments of sea battles and other centuries-old events, typically of regional interest, or acts out songs with members of the crowd.

In 2011, the track "Down by the Water" from their album The King Is Dead was nominated for Best Rock Song at the 54th Grammy Awards.

== History ==
=== 2000: Formation ===
The Decemberists formed in 2000 when Colin Meloy left his band Tarkio in Montana and moved to Portland, Oregon. There he met Nate Query, who introduced Meloy to Jenny Conlee (they had played together in the band Calobo) and the three scored a silent film together. Playing a solo show prior to meeting Query, Meloy met Chris Funk. Funk was a fan of Tarkio and played pedal steel on the first two Decemberists releases, not "officially" becoming a member until the third effort. The band's first drummer, Ezra Holbrook, was replaced by Rachel Blumberg after Castaways and Cutouts, who in turn was replaced by John Moen after Picaresque.

The band's name refers to the Decembrist revolt, an 1825 insurrection in Imperial Russia. Meloy has stated that the name is also meant to invoke the "drama and melancholy" of the month of December. 5 Songs, the band's debut extended play, was self-released in 2001. The members at that time played for several hours in a McMenamins hotel the night before to raise the money needed to record in the studio the next day. This originally served as a demo tape and the five songs on it (minus "Apology Song") were recorded in under two hours.

=== 2003–2005: Kill Rock Stars ===
After releasing its first full record, Castaways and Cutouts, on Hush Records, the group moved onto the Kill Rock Stars recording label. After the re-release of Castaways, Her Majesty the Decemberists was released in 2003. In 2004, the band released "The Tain", an eighteen-and-a-half minute single track based on the Irish mythological epic Táin Bó Cúailnge. The band's final album with Kill Rock Stars was Picaresque, which was recorded in a former church.

In March 2005, the band distributed a music video via BitTorrent, the self-produced "16 Military Wives" (from Picaresque). In the same month, the band's equipment trailer was stolen; fans contributed to a replacement fund, and another fundraiser was organized via an eBay auction, with buyers bidding for copies of Colin Meloy Sings Morrissey and original artwork by Carson Ellis. The band also received help from Lee Kruger, the Shins, the Dandy Warhols, and other musicians. C.F. Martin & Company offered 6- and 12-string guitars on permanent loan. In early April, police discovered the trailer and a portion of the band's merchandise in Clackamas, Oregon, but the instruments and equipment were not recovered.

=== 2005–2006: Capitol Records debut and The Crane Wife ===
On December 12, 2005, Meloy revealed to Pitchfork Media that the band had signed to Capitol Records, and planned to begin recording their major label debut with producers Tucker Martine and Chris Walla (of Death Cab for Cutie) in April 2006. The band's first album on Capitol, The Crane Wife, was released on October 3, 2006. The release was accompanied by an appearance the same day on Late Night with Conan O'Brien, during which the band performed "O Valencia!". The supporting tour (called "The Rout of the Patagons Tour") began on October 17, 2006, at Portland, Oregon's Crystal Ballroom. The opening act was Lavender Diamond. Later in the tour, Alasdair Roberts opened for the band. In 2006, The Crane Wife was voted NPR listeners' favorite album of the year, as announced on the December 5 episode of All Songs Considered, and it remains one of the Decemberists' most critically acclaimed records.

In November 2006, the band encouraged fans to create a music video for the single "O Valencia!" using footage of the band in front of a green screen. On his Comedy Central program, Stephen Colbert started a mock feud with the band, claiming his "green screen challenge" came first; the band countered that its 2005 on-stage lightsaber fight in San Francisco preceded Colbert's idea. The feud culminated in a December 20 guitar solo competition on Colbert's show, with lead guitarist Funk representing the band. After Colbert feigned a hand injury, Peter Frampton took over for Colbert and won an audience vote. Show guests got involved, with New York Governor-elect Eliot Spitzer and Dr. Henry Kissinger declaring, "Tonight, I think the American people won." The prize for winning the challenge was revealed to be a copy of The Crane Wife. According to Meloy, the Colbert challenge was not scripted, though the band was told that Frampton would step in for Colbert. The song "Sons and Daughters" was performed by characters in the ninth season of the American comedy television series The Office. It originally aired on NBC on March 14, 2013.

=== 2007: "A Bit of Grass-Stain Does Not a Ruined Pair of Jeans Make" tour ===
In July 2007, the band embarked on a five-date tour with a full orchestral accompaniment. On July 7, the tour put the band on the stage of the historic Hollywood Bowl for the first time, pairing them with the Los Angeles Philharmonic. On July 15, the band performed with The Mann Festival Orchestra at the Mann Center for the Performing Arts in Philadelphia, Pennsylvania, where they debuted a new song. On July 23 with the Atlanta Symphony Orchestra at the legendary Chastain Park Amphitheater in Atlanta, Georgia. The band then played a free concert in Chicago at the Millennium Park with the Grant Park Symphony Orchestra.

On October 6, 2007, the band announced the cancellation of the remainder of their European tour, citing the ill health of a band member. On November 1, 2007, the band further canceled the remaining 28 shows of their "Long and Short of It" tour.

=== 2008: Always the Bridesmaid ===
The members of The Decemberists appeared, individually billed (as "Colin Meloy, Chris Funk, Jenny Conlee, Nate Query, and John Moen"), to perform in support of Democratic presidential candidate Barack Obama at a rally at the Tom McCall Waterfront Park in Portland, Oregon, on May 18, 2008. On October 14, 2008 the band began releasing a series of singles called Always the Bridesmaid; a volume was released every month until the end of the year. The band also took up a limited tour in support of the singles, including an appearance on Late Night with Conan O'Brien.

=== 2009: The Hazards of Love ===
The Hazards of Love was released on March 24, 2009 on Capitol Records, under Red Light Management (Jason Colton and Ron Laffitte). It was made available for download on iTunes one week earlier, on March 17, 2009. The track "The Rake's Song" was put up for download on The Decemberists website in advance of the album's release. During Meloy's 2008 U.S. tour, he played several new songs that were included on the album. The album was produced by Tucker Martine.

In a post on Rolling Stone's "Rock 'n' Roll Daily" blog, the band revealed more details about the album. The original plan was for The Hazards of Love to be a staged musical. However, it seems that the story was "unstageable" in such a format. Instead the band played the entire album start to finish at each concert on the spring tour. A press release read: "The album began when Meloy – long fascinated by the British folk revival of the 1960s – found a copy of revered vocalist Anne Briggs's 1966 EP, titled The Hazards of Love. Since there was no actual song with the album's title, he set out to write one, but was soon immersed in something much larger. The Hazards of Love tells the tale of a woman named Margaret; her shape-shifting lover, William; his fey forest queen mother; and a cold-blooded, lascivious rake, who recounts with spine-chilling ease how he came "to be living so easy and free" in "The Rake's Song". Lavender Diamond's Becky Stark and My Brightest Diamond's Shara Nova deliver the lead vocals for the female characters, while My Morning Jacket's Jim James, Robyn Hitchcock and The Spinanes' Rebecca Gates appear in supporting roles. The range of sounds reflects the characters' arcs, from the accordion's singsong lilt in "Isn't it a Lovely Night?" to the heavy metal thunder of 'The Queen's Rebuke/The Crossing.'"

On February 9, 2009, the Decemberists announced in a newsletter to fans that they would be embarking on the first leg of the "A Short Fazed Hovel" Tour 2009 starting on May 19 in Los Angeles at the Hollywood Palladium. The newsletter included a complete list of dates for the first leg of the tour ending on June 14 at the Bonnaroo Music & Arts Festival in Manchester, Tennessee. On Monday April 27, the band performed a shortened version of "The Wanting Comes in Waves/Repaid" on The Colbert Report.

On August 14, 2009, the Decemberists played in Pittsburgh at the Benedum Center. During the show, the band members performed a skit where they ran up and down the aisles participating in a fictitious battle at Fort Pitt.

On September 19, 2009, The Decemberists played a "lottery show", originally billed as a "by request" show, at Terminal 5 in New York City. The setlist was composed of songs drawn from a large bingo turner kept on stage. The master of ceremonies for the evening was singer/songwriter John Wesley Harding and the opening act was Laura Veirs and the Hall of Flames. The randomized setlist included "July, July!", "Yankee Bayonet (I Will Be Home Then)", "The Tain I-V", "Annan Water", "The Crane Wife 3" and "The Island/Come and See/The Landlord's Daughter/You'll Not Feel the Drowning", and an original song, as a bingo ball suggested, called "Miracle on the Hudson".

In 2009, The Decemberists also contributed the song "Sleepless" to the AIDS benefit album Dark Was the Night, which was produced by the Red Hot Organization.

During their European tour in the winter of 2010, the band performed "The Mariner's Revenge Song" at the conclusion of each date. The audience was encouraged to scream as if they were being consumed by a whale mentioned in the track's narrative while the band pretended to die on stage.

=== 2010–2011: The King Is Dead and hiatus ===
The Decemberists remained off tour as they embarked on a new studio album. On September 4, 2010, the band opened for Neko Case and the headliner, Bob Dylan, the first day of the Bumbershoot Arts and Music Festival in Seattle, WA. There, they announced that they were wrapping up recording of a new album and debuted three of its tracks. The King Is Dead was released on January 14, 2011, with Peter Buck of R.E.M. contributing instrumentation to three of its songs. Colin Meloy later affirmed that R.E.M. had been an inspiration during the writing and recording of some of the album's material. "Down by the Water", a track from the new album, was released via the band's official site on November 2, and was immediately available on iTunes as a free download. The song would later be nominated for Best Rock Song at the 54th Grammy Awards. The King Is Dead debuted at No. 1 on the Billboard 200 in the United States upon its release, the first time a Decemberists album would achieve this. As compared to the band's previous work, which was influenced by the music of the British folk revival, The King Is Dead was more influenced by traditionally American genres including country, blues, and Americana.

The Decemberists' "Popes of Pendarvia World Tour" in support of The King Is Dead began with a show on January 25, 2011 at Beacon Theatre in New York City. The tour, which included engagements throughout the U.S., Canada, and Europe, ended on August 26 at the McMenamins Edgefield in Troutdale, Oregon. During the tour, on May 3, it was announced on The Decemberists' official site that Jenny Conlee had been diagnosed with breast cancer and would miss most of the band's remaining tour dates while receiving treatment and recovering. In support of their bandmate, the band designed a 'Team Jenny' charity t-shirt for the Yellow Bird Project to raise money for Planned Parenthood. Conlee would later make a full recovery after her cancer went into remission.

Meanwhile, on April 7, 2011, the band released a music video for their song "This Is Why We Fight". Directed by Aaron Stewart-Ahn, the video depicts a band of teenagers living in a bleak, post-apocalyptic society. Disgusted with the tyrannical rule of their "king", one boy and one girl lead a splinter group away from the camp. Outraged, the king and his forces attack, but the video cuts to black before any resolution can be seen. In August, an eight-song set was released on iTunes featuring six previously released tracks and two new covers: Leonard Cohen's "Hey, That's No Way To Say Goodbye" and the Fruit Bats' "When U Love Somebody". Later that month, a new music video was debuted for the track entitled "Calamity Song". The video depicts a game, played on a tennis court by children, of simulated thermonuclear war as described in the "Eschaton" scene of David Foster Wallace's novel Infinite Jest.

Meloy announced during the "Popes of Pendarvia" tour that the group would take a multi-year hiatus once the touring cycle was over. To cap off this period of activity, the band released the follow-up outtake EP Long Live the King on November 1, 2011, as well as a live album from their tour for The King is Dead titled We All Raise Our Voices to the Air (Live Songs 04.11–08.11) on March 13, 2012. In addition, the band recorded a song for The Hunger Games soundtrack, called "One Engine". The soundtrack, The Hunger Games: Songs from District 12 and Beyond, was released on March 20, 2012.

While on hiatus, the group's only activity as The Decemberists was composing part of the score for The Day the Earth Stood Cool, the 7th episode of the 24th season of The Simpsons. Colin Meloy also cameoed as himself in the episode.

=== 2014–2015: What a Terrible World, What a Beautiful World ===
During a solo tour in 2013, Meloy announced that The Decemberists would end their hiatus and begin working on a new album within the next year. The hiatus officially concluded on March 5, 2014, with the announcement of two headlining shows at Portland's Crystal Ballroom, the band's first shows in three years, where they played their debut album, Castaways and Cutouts, in its entirety. On April 24, further establishing their return, the band performed on the Season 6 finale of the NBC comedy series Parks and Recreation. Additionally, The Decemberists were the mystery band for the 2014 Boston Calling Music Festival, where they played on Saturday, May 24.

On November 3, 2014, "Make You Better", The Decemberists' first single off the new album, was released, and on January 20, 2015, the band's seventh studio album, What a Terrible World, What a Beautiful World, was released. To commemorate both the release of the new album and the Decemberists' success as a whole, January 20 was officially declared "Decemberists Day" in the group's hometown of Portland, Oregon, by mayor Charlie Hales.

In support of the album, The Decemberists made late-night appearances on Jimmy Kimmel Live! and Conan, and on February 11, embarked on a European tour which included dates in Ireland, the UK, The Netherlands, Belgium, Switzerland, Germany, and Italy. A North American tour began on March 21, 2015, in the band's hometown of Portland, Oregon.

On October 9, 2015, The Decemberists released a five-track EP compiled from leftover tracks recorded during the What a Terrible World, What a Beautiful World sessions entitled florasongs.

The track, A Beginning Song, is featured on the seventh episode of The Bear, Season Four.

=== 2017–2018: Offa Rex ===
A collaborative album titled The Queen of Hearts with UK folk artist Olivia Chaney was released under the name Offa Rex on Nonesuch Records on July 14, 2017. The album is composed mainly of versions of traditional and British folk revival songs from the 1970s. U.S. tour dates were announced for July and August 2017. In late 2017, the band contributed "Ben Franklin's Song", with lyrics by Hamilton creator Lin-Manuel Miranda, to Miranda's monthly "Hamildrops".

=== 2018–present: I'll Be Your Girl and As It Ever Was, So It Will Be Again ===
On January 17, 2018, the band announced the new album I'll Be Your Girl, released on March 16. The album is produced by John Congleton and was accompanied by a tour. On August 14, the band's concert at Prospect Park Bandshell (part of the BRIC Celebrate Brooklyn Festival) was broadcast live on WFUV. Along with newer material, the band performed The Crane Wife in its entirety. On December 14 of that year, they released an EP, Traveling On.

Pitchfork highlighted that the band had planned a 2020 tour for their twentieth anniversary; however, it "was bumped to 2021 before being canceled outright". The group celebrated their twentieth anniversary with a series of streamed concerts in April 2021. Their North American tour in August 2022 was titled Arise From The Bunkers.

In September 2023, the band began work on their ninth studio album. On February 6, 2024, the band announced the release of new song "Burial Ground" and a forthcoming North American tour. On March 19, they released the song "Joan in the Garden" and announced their album would be called As It Ever Was, So It Will Be Again. The album was released on June 14, 2024, on YABB Records.

== Musical style ==
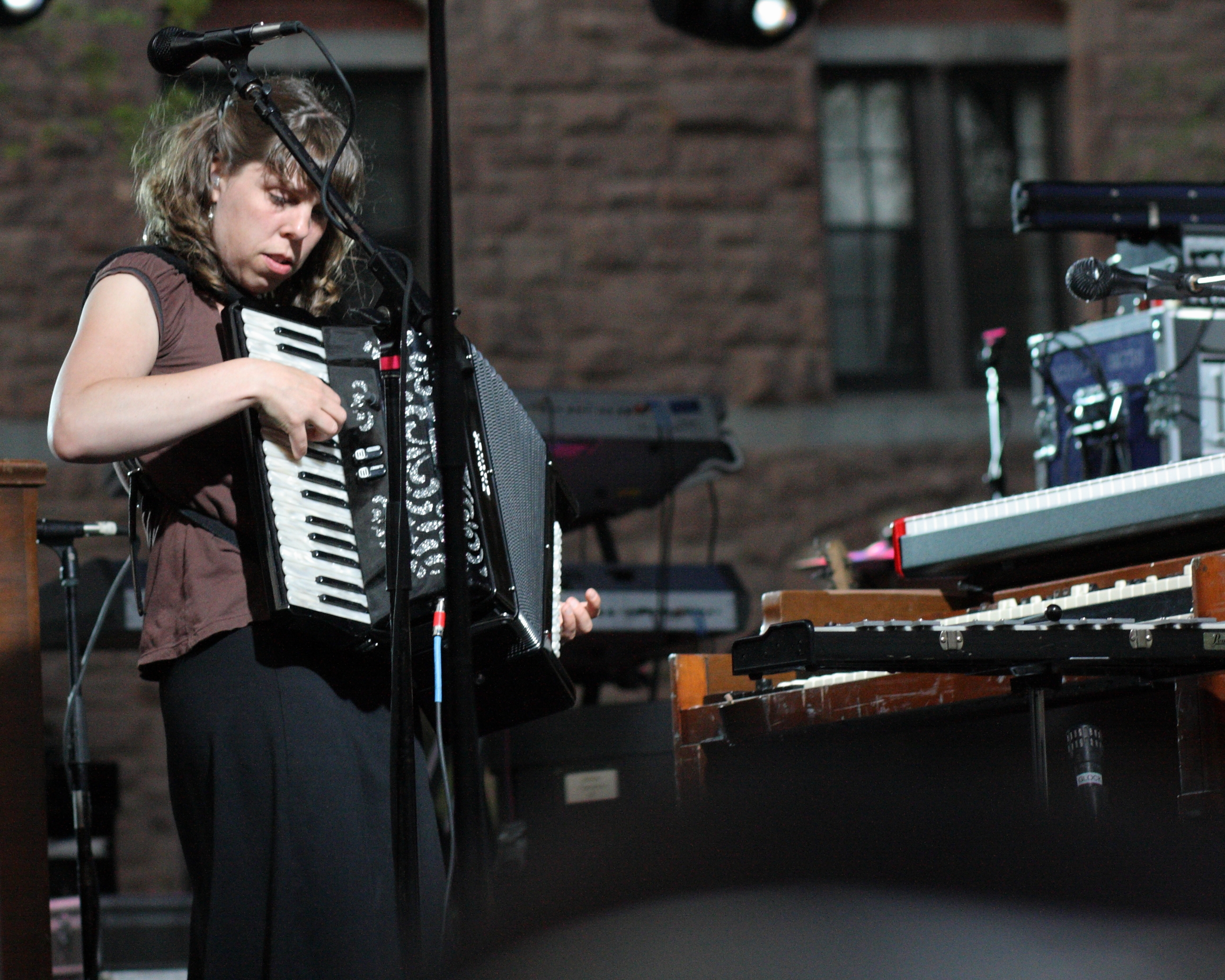
Conlee playing accordion, with other keyboard instruments nearby

The group's songs range from upbeat pop to instrumentally lush ballads, and often employ instruments like the accordion, keyboards, and upright bass. In its lyrics, the band eschews the introspection common to modern rock, instead favoring a storytelling approach employing a wide, eloquent vocabulary, as evidenced in songs such as "My Mother Was a Chinese Trapeze Artist" from the 5 Songs EP and "The Mariner's Revenge Song" on Picaresque. The band's songs convey tales ranging from whimsical ("The Sporting Life", "Apology Song") to epic ("The Tain") to dark ("Odalisque", "The Rake's Song") to political ("16 Military Wives", "Valerie Plame"), and often invoke historical events and themes from around the world ("Yankee Bayonet", "Shankill Butchers").

Their musical style has been described as indie rock, baroque pop, indie pop, indie folk, alternative rock, folk rock, and orchestral pop. The band's 2009 release, The Hazards of Love, supplemented their usual folk and alternative style with progressive rock and metal.

=== Influences and character ===
Meloy confessed a "slavish love" for Morrissey, one of his principal influences, to whom he has a tattoo dedicated, and has made "a sort of pilgrimage" to the site of the cover photograph for the Waterboys' Fisherman's Blues, an album he "wore out from obsessively repeated listens." The band has also cited their liking for Siouxsie and the Banshees, and the pop tunes of R.E.M. and XTC. The band also draws inspiration from British and Irish folk music.

== Band members ==
Current members

- Colin Meloy – lead vocals, rhythm guitar, bouzouki, harmonica (2000–present)
- Chris Funk – lead guitar, pedal steel, mandolin, banjo, theremin, backing vocals (2000–present)
- Nate Query – double bass, bass guitar, cello, backing vocals (2000–2003, 2004–present)
- Jenny Conlee – keyboards, piano, accordion, glockenspiel, backing vocals (2000–present)
- John Moen – drums, backing vocals (2005–present)

Current touring musicians

- Lizzy Ellison – backing vocals, rhythm guitar, keyboards, banjo (2022–present)
- Victor Nash – trumpet, keyboards, harmonica (2024–present)

Former members

- Ezra Holbrook – drums, backing vocals (2000–2002)
- Rachel Blumberg – drums, backing vocals (2002–2005)
- Jesse Emerson – bass guitar, double bass (2003–2004)
- Petra Haden – violin, backing vocals (2005–2006; touring 2004–2005)

Former touring musicians

- Sara Watkins – fiddle, rhythm guitar, backing vocals (2011)
- Nora O'Connor Kean – backing vocals, acoustic guitar (2014–2020)
- Kelly Hogan – backing vocals, percussion (2016–2020)

Timeline

== Discography ==
- Castaways and Cutouts (2002)
- Her Majesty the Decemberists (2003)
- Picaresque (2005)
- The Crane Wife (2006)
- The Hazards of Love (2009)
- The King Is Dead (2011)
- What a Terrible World, What a Beautiful World (2015)
- I'll Be Your Girl (2018)
- As It Ever Was, So It Will Be Again (2024)
