= John Moen =

American musician

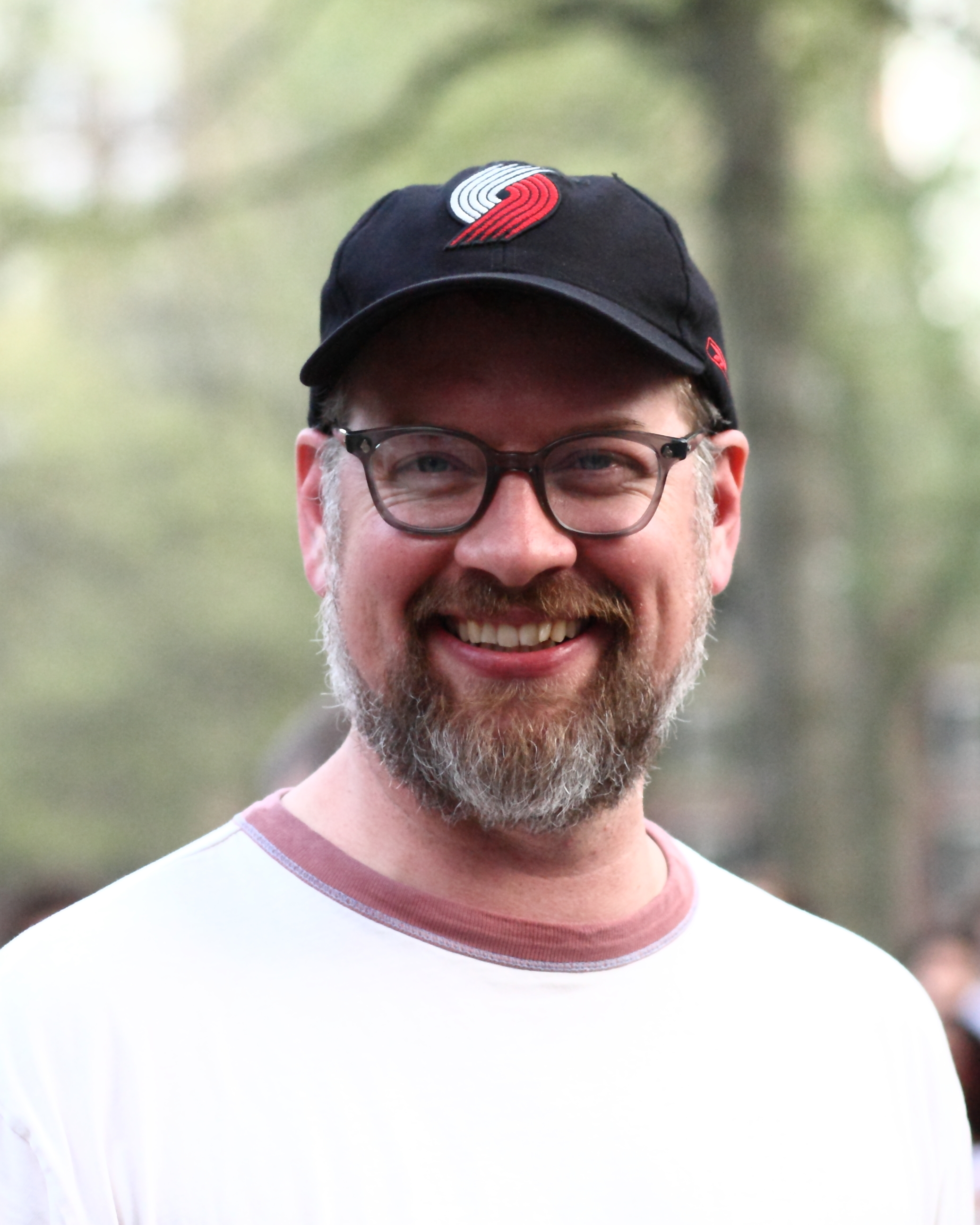
- Moen after performing with The Decemberists (2009)

Background information
- Born: Brainerd, Minnesota, U.S.
- Origin: Salem, Oregon, U.S.
- Genres: Indie rock, folk rock, baroque pop
- Occupations: Musician, producer
- Instruments: Drums, percussion, guitar, organ, banjo, melodica

John Moen is a musician and member of The Decemberists, Black Prairie, Boston Spaceships, Eyelids, and Perhapst. Moen has played the drums since he was 15 years old.

Prior to joining The Decemberists, Moen played with over 20 bands including singer-songwriter Elliott Smith, Heatmiser, The Jicks, Cavemanish Boys, The Dharma Bums, The Minus 5, and the Maroons. Moen has worked with Decemberists side project Black Prairie.

Moen was born in Brainerd, Minnesota and raised in Salem, Oregon. He has one child.
