= Nate Query =

American musician

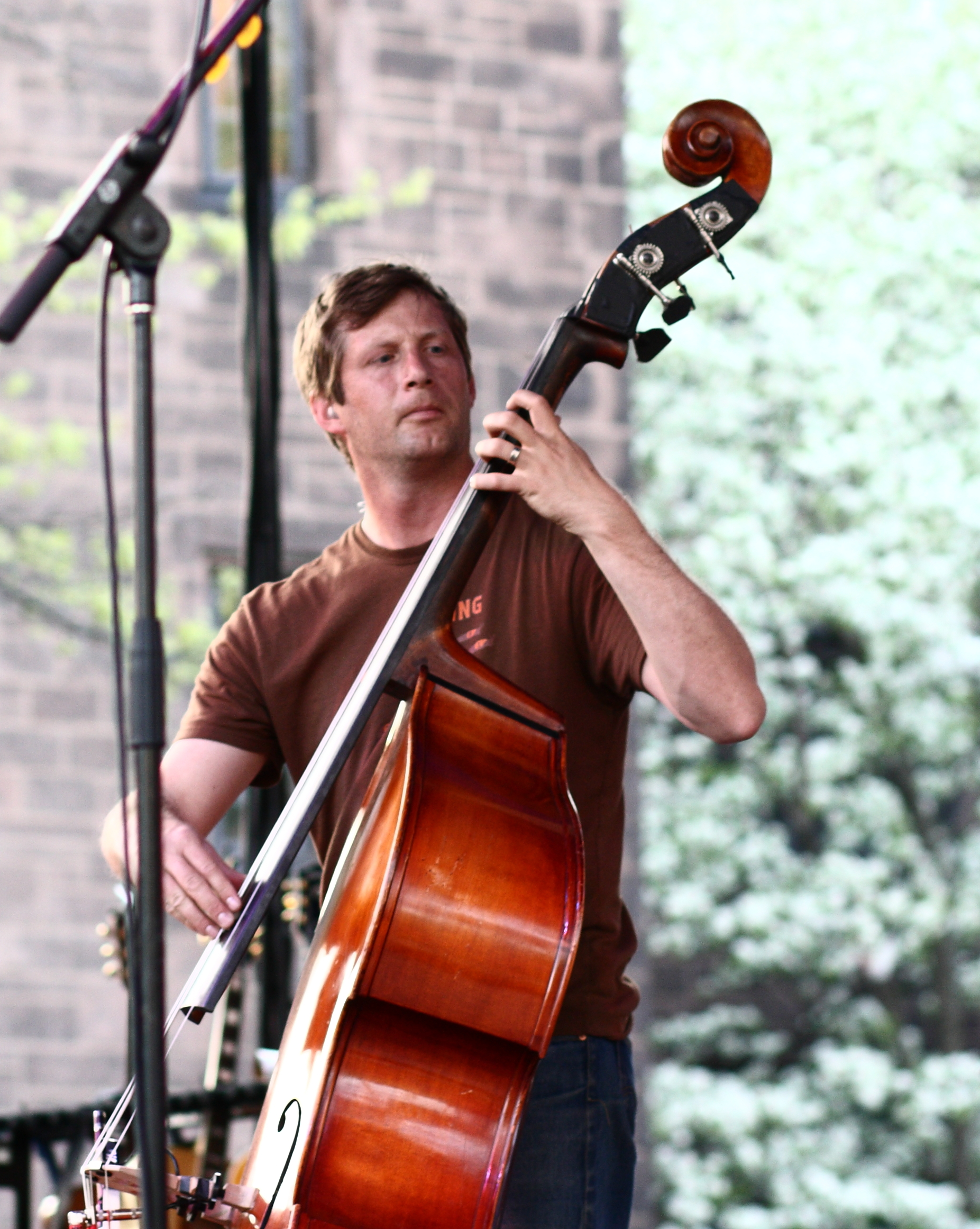
Query performing with The Decemberists (2009)

Nate Query (born September 5, 1973) is an American musician best known as the bassist of the Portland, Oregon indie rock band The Decemberists. He plays electric bass, upright bass, banjo and cello. He makes appearances on many albums by Portland artists, including Laura Gibson, Rebecca Gates, the Minus 5, and Laura Veirs. He is also credited on Michael Zapruder's record. His former bands include Calobo and Everyday Dirt. His most recent project is the acoustic band Black Prairie with a number of other Portland artists.

== Personal life ==
Query was born in Bellevue Washington. He attended Portland's West Sylvan Middle School and Lincoln High School (Portland, Oregon). He is married and has two children. His favorite book is the Tao Te Ching as translated by Stephen Mitchell, saying "I've read it 20 times and every time I learn something. Reminds me not to take things too seriously." He is an avid home brewer.
