= Chris Funk =

Christopher Funk
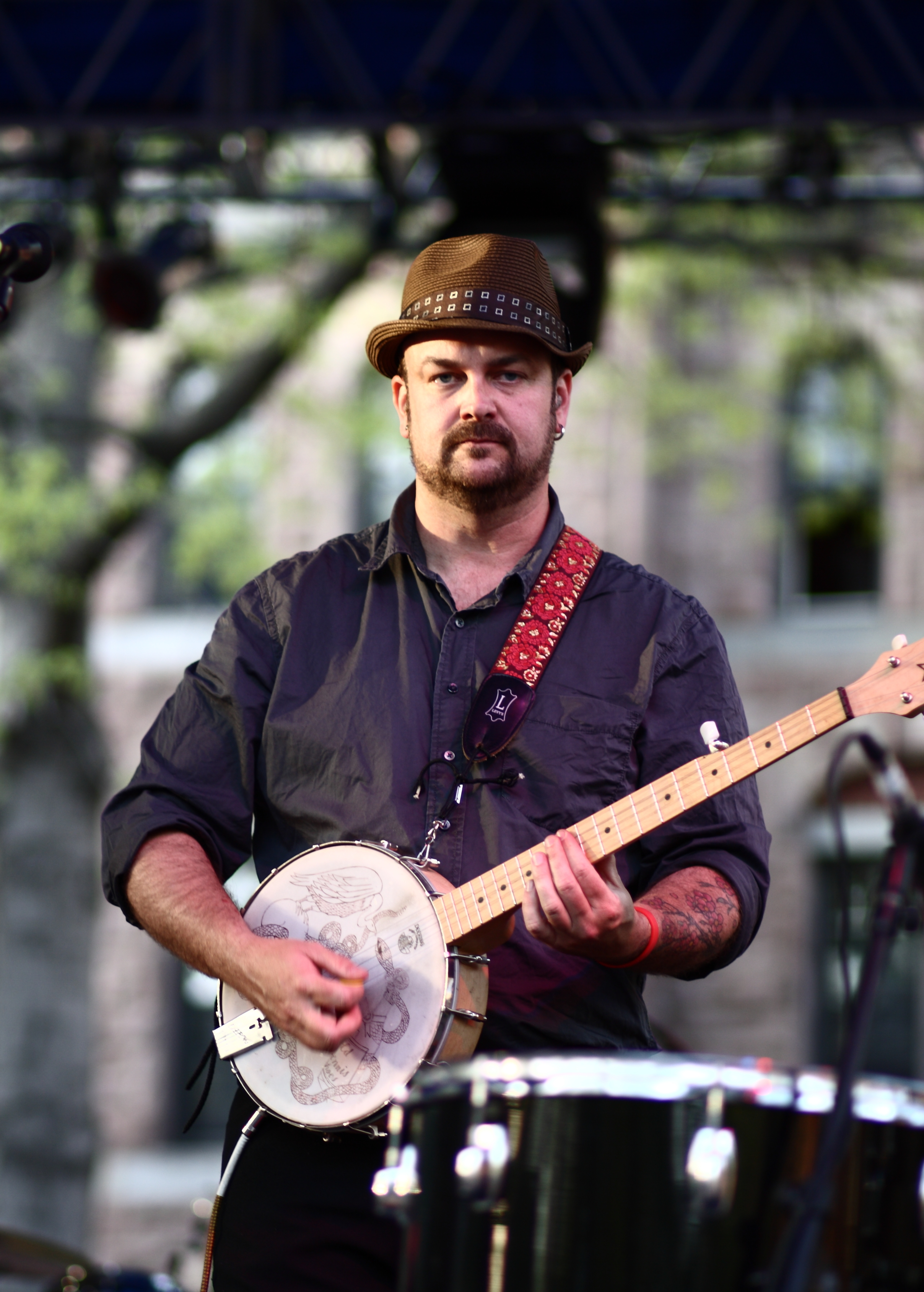
- Funk in April 2009

Background information
- Origin: Valparaiso, Indiana
- Genres: Folk, folk rock, country rock, indie rock, bluegrass
- Occupation(s): Musician, songwriter, record producer
- Instrument(s): Vocals, guitar, pedal steel, piano, violin, dobro, hurdy-gurdy, autoharp, mandolin, bouzouki, banjo, saxophone, theremin

Christopher Funk (born November 28, 1971) is an American musician and multi-instrumentalist best known as a member of the Portland, Oregon, indie rock band The Decemberists. He plays guitar, pedal steel, piano, violin, dobro, hurdy-gurdy, mandolin, saxophone, the theremin and many other instruments. According to Colin Meloy, as stated at the Pilgrimage Festival in Franklin, TN on September 27, 2015, Funk was originally given the middle name "Ryman" but a clerical error on his birth certificate resulted in his middle name being recorded as "Lyman."

== Early life ==
Funk attended Coe College in Cedar Rapids, Iowa, and is originally from Valparaiso, Indiana.

== Musical career ==
Funk joined the Decemberists after meeting Colin Meloy at a solo show Meloy was performing. He has been a member of the band since its formation, appearing on every Decemberists record since. Funk most commonly contributes guitar, pedal steel, and mandolin tracks to the band's songs, though he has laid down tracks with several other instruments as well. After an incident in which the band's equipment trailer was stolen in 2005, Funk wrote "This Machine Kills Thieves" on his banjo, in reference to Pete Seeger and Woody Guthrie.

He is a member of Knock-knock with DJ Rev. Shines (from the hip-hop group Lifesavas on Quannum Projects). He is also a member of the string band Black Prairie who released their first album, Feast of the Hunter's Moon, in 2010. He plays in the country rock group Blue Giant. He has produced records for The Builders and The Butchers, Langhorne Slim, and Red Fang, and curated the Portland edition of Burn to Shine DVD released in 2006.

On December 20, 2006, Funk appeared on Comedy Central's The Colbert Report to end a longstanding mock feud with the show's host, Stephen Colbert. A contest ensued in which Funk and Colbert would each play a guitar solo while a panel of judges decided the winner. After Funk's solo, Colbert (who cannot play the guitar) feigned an injured hand, having Peter Frampton fill in for him instead. The contest ended with Colbert/Frampton being decided the winners by show guests Eliot Spitzer and Henry Kissinger, and Colbert was awarded The Crane Wife by The Decemberists as the grand prize. Funk then performed an "all-guitar jam" alongside Frampton, Robert Schneider (of The Apples in Stereo), and Rick Nielsen.

== Discography ==
=== The Decemberists ===
See: The Decemberists discography

=== Black Prairie ===
- Feast of the Hunter's Moon (Sugar Hill Records, 2010)
- The Storm in the Barn (self-released, 2012)
- A Tear in the Eye Is a Wound in the Heart (Sugar Hill Records, 2012)
- Wild Ones (Captain Bluegrass, 2013)
- Fortune (Sugar Hill Records, 2014)

=== Flash Hawk Parlor Ensemble ===
- Plastic Bag in the Tree (Hush Records, 2007)

=== Knock-knock ===
- Busted in Borstle (Barsuk, 2007)
- To Elliott, From Portland (contributed cover of Elliott Smith's "Speed Trials")

=== Guest artist ===
- Langhorne Slim "Be Set Free"
- Laura Veirs "July Flame"
- The Minus 5 "Killngsworth"
- Mirah, "(a)spera"
- The Shins, "Wincing the Night Away"
- The Long Winters, "Putting the Days to Bed"
- Lifesavas, "Gutterfly"
- Norfolk & Western, "Dusk in Cold Parlours" & "If You Were Born Overseas"
- Tracker, "Blankets" & "Polk"
- Blanket Music, "Cultural Norms"
- Casey Neill, "Brooklyn Bridge"
- Typhoon, "White Lighter"
- Markus Ello, "Winesburg, Ohio", "Big Charade", "Rock In My Head", "As Fucked As Me"
- Your Neighbors, "4184"

=== Producer ===
- Stephen Malkmus and the Jicks - Sparkle Hard (2018)
- Langhorne Slim
- Y La Bamba
- The Builders and The Butchers
- Peter Wilde - "Carnival"
- Red Fang
- Ashleigh Flynn - "A Million Stars"
