= Jenny Conlee =

American musician (born 1971)

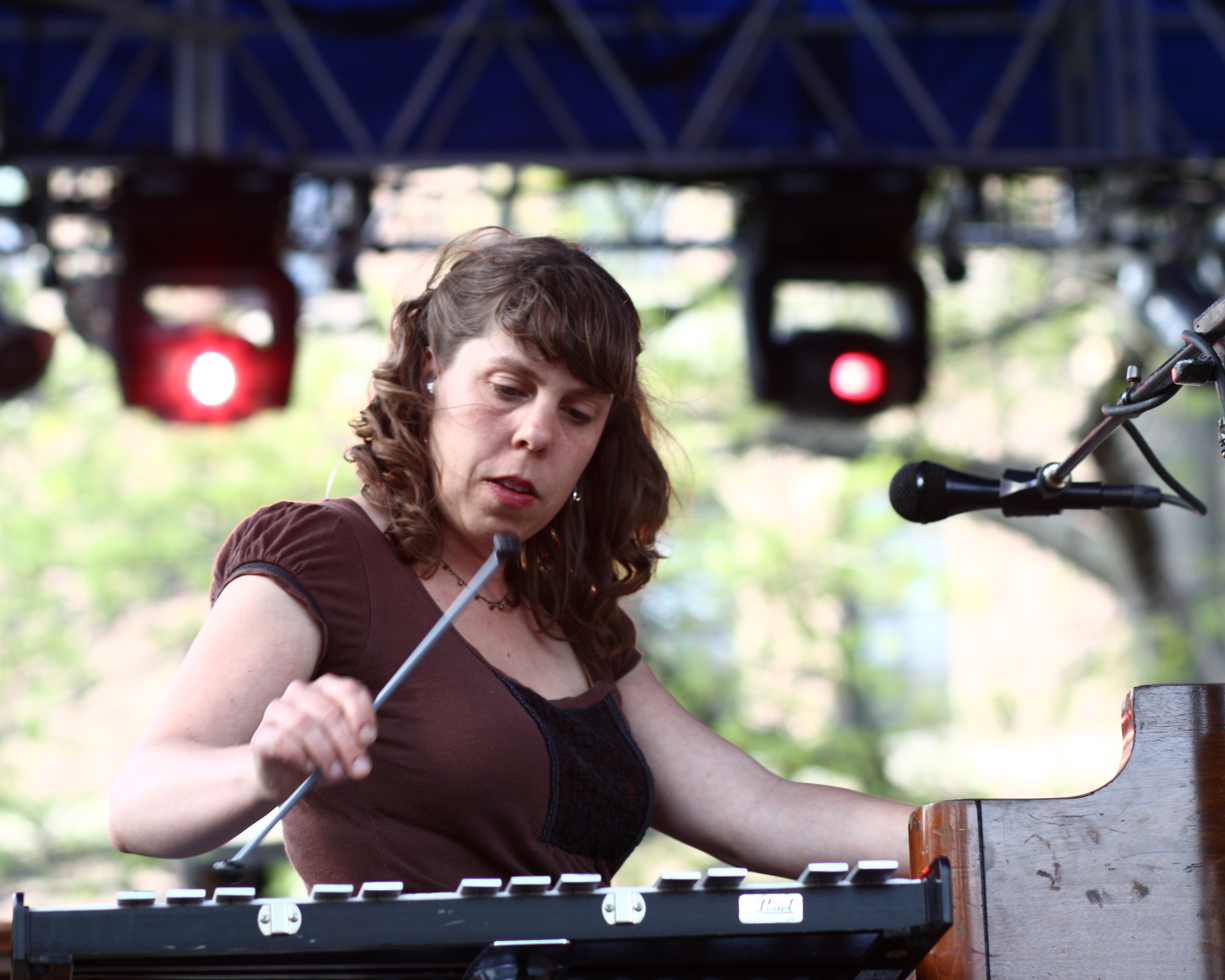
- Conlee performing with the Decemberists (2009)

Background information
- Born: December 12, 1971 (age 53); Seattle, Washington, U.S.
- Occupation: Musician
- Instruments: Accordion; keyboards; percussion; melodica; harmonica; vocals

Jennifer Lynn Conlee-Drizos (born December 12, 1971) is an American musician, best known as the accordionist, pianist, organist, keyboardist, melodica player, and occasional backup singer and harmonicist for the indie rock quintet the Decemberists.

== Musical career ==
Aside from her work with the Decemberists, Conlee has made guest appearances on several records by other artists, including Hush Records artist Reclinerland, Lewi Longmire, Jerry Joseph, Buoy LaRue and others. Before the Decemberists, she played piano for the 1990s Portland, Oregon, band Calobo. She is also a member of Portland-based Casey Neill & the Norway Rats where she plays keyboards, accordion, and glockenspiel. Her most recent project is the acoustic band Black Prairie, in which she plays with a number of other Portland artists. She also founded the band KMRIA (Kiss My Royal Irish Arse), a the Pogues cover band.

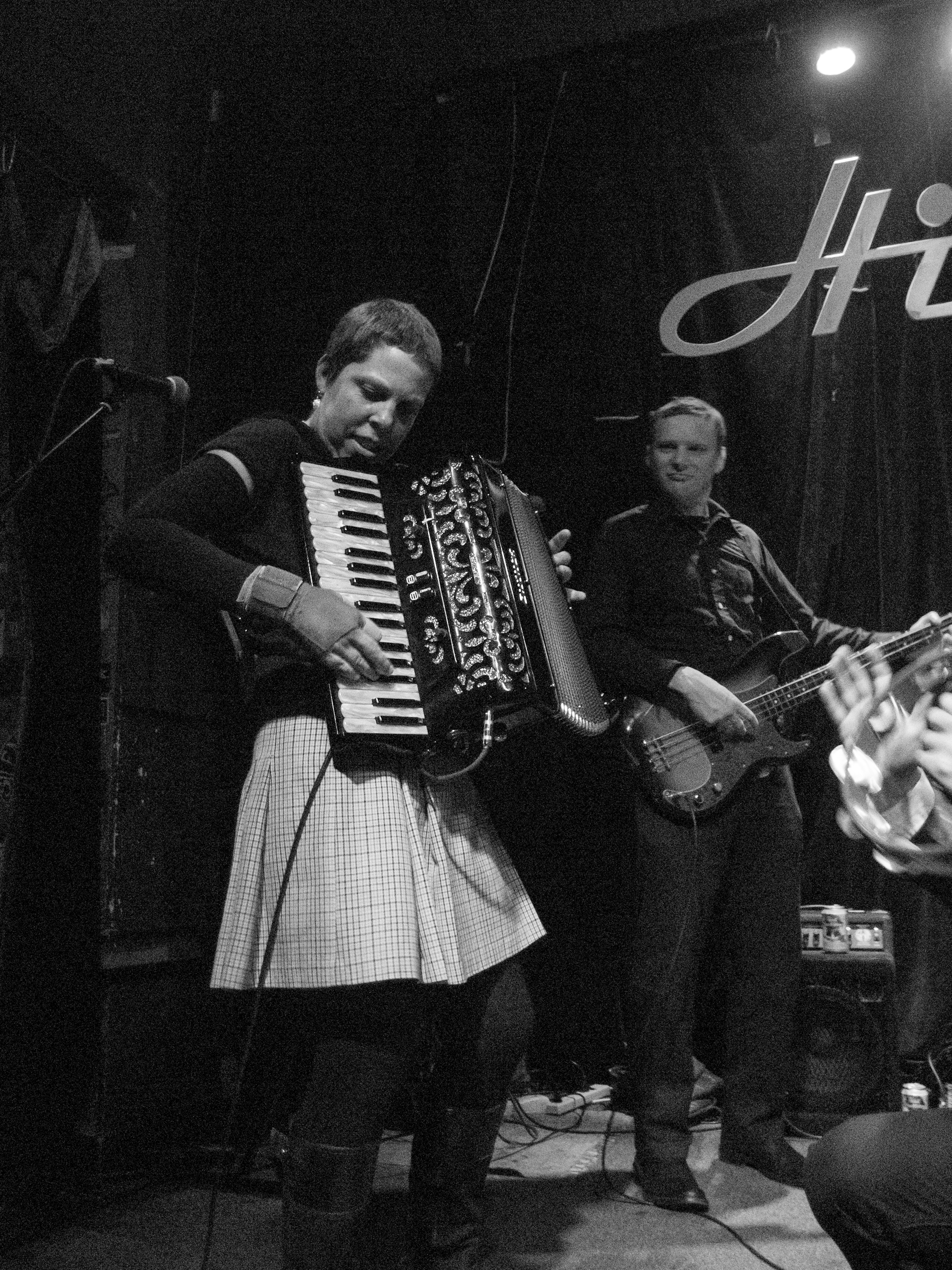
Jenny Conlee playing accordion with the Pogues cover band KMRIA at The High Dive in Fremont, Seattle

Conlee's accordions include a Paolo Soprani, which was on display at the Rock and Roll Hall of Fame and a Petosa Futura, which she described as her "regular axe".

Her solo debut Tides: Pieces for Accordion and Piano was released in 2023.

== Television ==
In 2011, she appeared on Portlandia in comedic skits with Fred Armisen and Carrie Brownstein. She played a musician who unsuccessfully tries to play at every venue at Blunderbuss, a fictional citywide Portland, Oregon, festival, as a member of the band Sparkle Pony, and is turned away as she is not on the line up of any of them.

She also appeared on Parks and Recreation when the Decemberists performed at the Unity Concert.

== Personal life ==
She is married to drummer Steve Drizos. In May 2011, Conlee was diagnosed with breast cancer. Colin Meloy said that a full recovery was likely, but that she would miss some concerts. On October 20, 2011, Meloy announced via his Twitter that Conlee's cancer was in remission.
