= Conserve School =

Private school in Land O' Lakes, Wisconsin, U.S.

Coordinates: 46.173712°N 89.302376°W

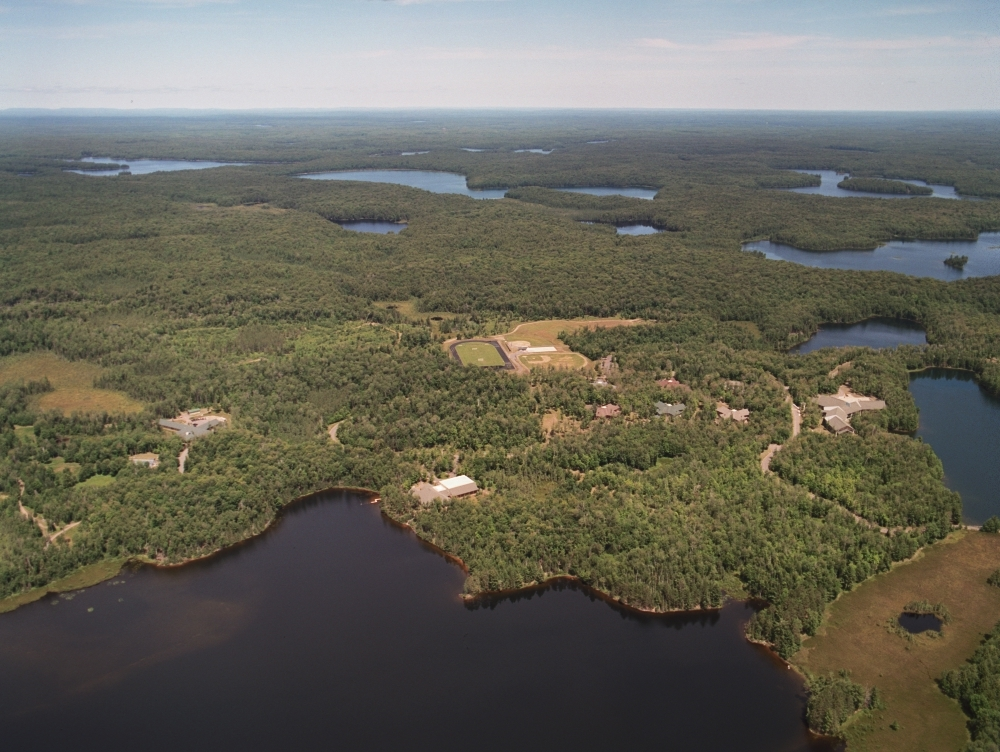
- Looking across campus into the Sylvania Wilderness and Recreation Area

Location
- 5400 N. Black Oak Lake Rd. Land O' Lakes, Wisconsin 54540; United States

Information
- Type: Private (Single semester school)
- Established: 2002
- Head of school: Stefan Anderson
- Grades: 10-11
- Enrollment: ~60
- Accreditation: NCA CASI, ACA
- Website: conserveschool.org

Conserve School was a semester school for environmentally and outdoor minded high school students located in Land O' Lakes, Vilas County, Wisconsin, United States. For seventeen weeks students would pursue a program of environmental studies and outdoor activities that were designed to deepen their love of nature, reinforce their commitment to conservation, and equip them to take meaningful action as environmental stewards.

The program interwove college-preparatory academics with:

- the study of environmental history, nature literature, and the science of conservation,
- environmental service work,
- exploration of careers related to conservation,
- training in teamwork and leadership, and
- engagement with the outdoors.

Designed primarily for high school juniors, Conserve School incorporated the flexibility to accommodate advanced sophomores.

== Academics ==
The Conserve School academic program was made up of two types of courses, Core Courses and Electives.

All students took the four core courses:

- English: Wilderness Voices, American Literature and the Land
- History: Environmental Citizenship
- Outdoor Skills
- Advanced Placement Environmental Science

Students would select their electives based on their individual needs. Math and Spanish electives focused on keeping students up-to-date in these sequential and skill-based subjects. Students could also choose from the electives Nature Photography or Earth Art.

== Faculty and staff ==
Conserve School's teaching staff was augmented by a cohort of Teaching Fellows. Teaching Fellows were typically individuals interested in exploring a career working with young adults. They gained experience planning and teaching alongside Conserve School's teaching and residential life staff.

== Accreditation ==
Conserve School was accredited by two internationally known accreditation agencies. Conserve School's academic program was accredited by the North Central Association Commission on Accreditation and School Improvement (NCA CASI), an accreditation division of AdvancED. Conserve School had achieved American Camp Association (ACA) accreditation to support the school's outdoor and residential life programming.

== Lowenwood ==
Conserve School's 1,200-acre (4.9 km^{2}) campus was named Lowenwood by Conserve School's founder, James Lowenstine. The campus has access to eight lakes (of which four are completely enclosed by school property). The campus is adjacent to the Sylvania Wilderness and Sylvania Recreation Area and its additional 18,327 acres (74.17 km^{2}) of forests, lakes, and streams.

The Lowenstine Academic Building (or LAB) was the main campus building with a variety of classrooms, art & music spaces, a theater, dining room, library, and expansive indoor open area called the Gathering Space. The Lowenwood Recreation Center (or LRC) was the hub for athletic and outdoor activities with its gymnasium, fitness center, outdoor equipment room, locker rooms, and welcoming lounge. Students could check out a variety of equipment from the LRC to aid in their outdoor pursuits including bikes, boats, skis, snowshoes, and ice skates. There were five housing units along the Student Path, each contained four wings of suite-style dormitories, as well as 4 apartment sections reserved for staff. Each wing was equipped with a kitchenette ready for minimal culinary activities. Each housing unit was named after a piece of Lowenwood's history, including James, Elaine, Daisy, and Mandell, all of which related to the founding fathers and mothers of Conserve School, as well as Donahue, a prevailing logging company in the north woods.

There are roughly 22 miles (35 km) of trails on Conserve School's grounds, which students used for hiking, biking, snowshoeing, and skiing.

== Awards/Recognition ==
2014 U.S. Department of Education Green Ribbon Schools Awardee - in recognition of exemplary efforts in reducing environmental impact and utility costs, promoting better health for students and staff, and offering effective environmental education, including civics, STEM and green career pathways.

2014 Conserve School Named Green & Healthy Schools Wisconsin "Sugar Maple" certification.

2012 Earthguard Award, Wisconsin Association for Environmental Education - for student leadership in developing and conducting outstanding environmental action projects.

2003-2010 Wisconsin State Envirothon Championships - 1st place 2003, 2004, 2005, 2006, 2007; 2nd place 2008, 2009, 2010.

2004 - Named an Audubon International Certified Signature Sanctuary. Audubon International recognizes program members that demonstrate their commitment to environmental quality by meeting required standards for protecting the environment, conserving natural resources, and providing wildlife habitats.

== History ==
With the passing of James Lowenstine in 1996, the building of his dream, a school to inspire conservation minded environmental stewards, began. Following the directions Mr. Lowenstine left in the Conserve School Trust the Conserve School Board of Trustees began the initial planning for Conserve School. Mr. Lowenstine directed the Trustees to create a school with a curriculum that would include: instruction in reading, writing, arithmetic, and nature study. The nature study was to include a focus on the ecology of unspoiled forest and lake areas such as Conserve School's Lowenwood campus. In addition the school should include instruction in outdoor sports including skiing, use of snowshoes, archery, ice skating, target practice, swimming, fishing, boating, camping, sledding, methods of survival in unexplored areas, and other outdoor activities.

From the fall of 2002 until the spring of 2010 Conserve School operated as a four-year college preparatory school. Due to financial concerns, the school switched to its current semester school model in the fall of 2010. The decision to transition the school was legally challenged by a group of concerned parents, alumni, and community members, as well as by the Culver Educational Foundation.

On August 21, 2010, the first semester school semester began with 48 students from 12 different states.

The final semester of Conserve School finished in June 2020 following the relinquishment to the Culver Academy.

=== Legal challenges ===
On November 14, 2005, a lawsuit was filed against Conserve School by the Culver Educational Foundation, parent of Culver Academies in northern Indiana. The suit alleged a breach of fiduciary duties on the part of Conserve School's trustees, claiming the construction and continued operation of Conserve School was financially unsustainable. Culver stood to inherit nearly all of the trust assets should the operation of Conserve School be declared financially impractical. On May 25, 2007, at the request of Culver, the lawsuit was dismissed with prejudice, with all parties to bear their own costs and attorney's fees.

In response to the Conserve School Trustee's decision announced in January 2009 to transition to a semester school, a group of parents and alumni filed a lawsuit to preserve the four-year program The case was filed in Vilas County Circuit Court on February 20, 2009. On April 7 the Culver Educational Foundation joined the lawsuit against Conserve School. On April 14, Wisconsin Attorney General J.B. Van Hollen asked the Vilas County Circuit Court for permission to intervene in the lawsuit. On June 8 the Vilas County Circuit Court upheld the Conserve School Trustees' right to transition to a semester school and denied the Wisconsin Attorney General's request to intervene. The Culver Educational Foundation appealed the ruling to the Wisconsin Court of Appeals. On November 16, 2010 the Wisconsin Court of Appeals for District III affirmed the ruling by the Vilas County Circuit Court. The Wisconsin Court of Appeals decision concludes with the statement, "Although the trustees' new program is a significant departure from the way the school previously operated, it does not reflect a finding of legal impossibility or impracticality. To the contrary, it reflects the trustees' desire to operate the school in a manner best suited to current economic realities within the boundaries of the trust instrument."

== See also ==
- Alzar School
- HMI Semester
- The Mountain School
- Oxbow School
- School for Ethics and Global Leadership
- Woolman Semester
