= Casey Neill =

American musician

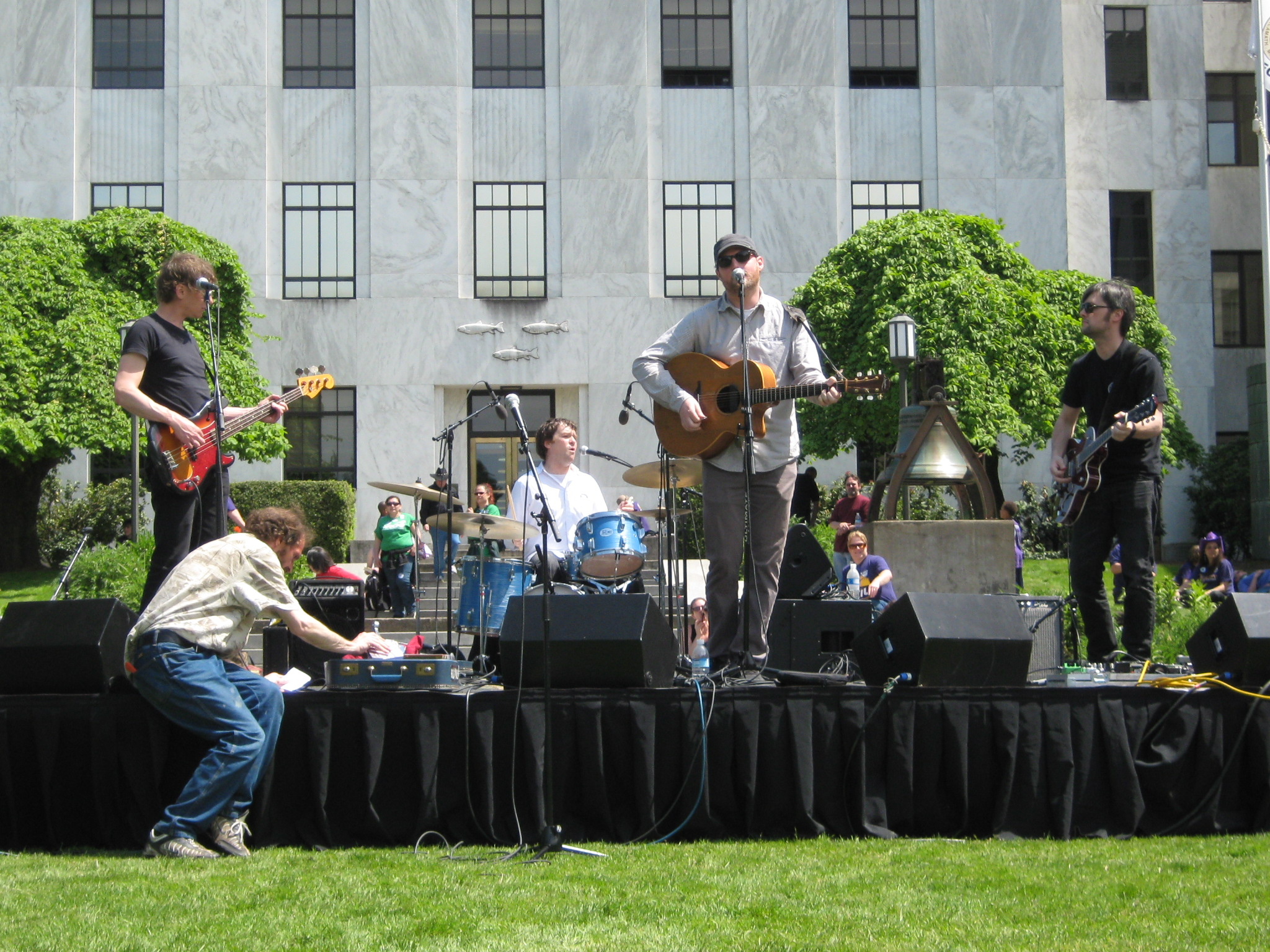
- Casey Neill and the Norway Rats playing at a union rally in Salem, Oregon

Background information
- Origin: Portland, Oregon, US
- Genres: Folk punk, rock
- Years active: 1994–present
- Label: In Music We Trust
- Members: Casey Neill; Jenny Conlee; Jeff 'Chet' Lyster; Joe Mengis; Jesse Emerson
- Website: www.caseyneill.org

Casey Neill, an Oregon Music Hall of Fame inductee, is an American musician. He leads Portland, Oregon-based band Casey Neill & the Norway Rats, singing with a raspy vocal quality and playing electric and acoustic guitars. Neill's style, folk-punk, mixes influences from punk, Celtic and folk music, and has been compared to R.E.M. and the Pogues.

The Norway Rats have included Jenny Conlee of the Decemberists on keyboards and accordion, among other established Portland musicians Jesse Emerson, Jeff 'Chet' Lyster, Lewi Longmire, Little Sue, Hanz Araki and Ezra Holbrook of Dr. Theopolis.

== History ==
Casey Neill was born in New Haven, Connecticut, in 1971 in a hospital room with "a nurse singing Irish folk songs". His father is Peter Neill. He moved to Olympia, Washington, in 1989 and graduated from the Evergreen State College with an ethnomusicology education. Neill then developed as an artist in the underground music community of the Pacific Northwest, releasing two early cassette releases and then his first CD, Rifraff, in 1995. Two songs from that album, "Rifraff" and "Dancing on The Ruins of Multinational Corporations", became the de facto soundtracks for many Earth First! and other logging protests during the 1990s, a time of growing tension between environmentalists and the logging communities of the Pacific Northwest. "Dancing on the Ruins of Multinational Corporations" is still sung by protest communities around the world.

The Scottish musician and producer Johnny Cunningham, one of Neill's early supporters, produced his albums Skree and Brooklyn Bridge. Cunningham plays fiddle on these albums plus Live on 11th Street, the last live recording of him before his untimely passing in 2003. Besides including some of his current bandmates and Johnny Cunningham, Brooklyn Bridge features cameos from Chris Funk of the Decemberists, John Wesley Harding, Erin McKeown and Phil Cunningham, Johnny's brother.

Neill has been included on numerous compilations. One tribute release, Where Have All the Flowers Gone: the Songs of Pete Seeger (Appleseed Recordings), won Top Independent Release of 1998 from the American Association of Independent Music. The compilation includes Neill alongside tracks from Bruce Springsteen and Billy Bragg, two artists to whom Neill has been compared.

Since 2012, Casey Neill has been a member of the Minus 5 playing electric guitar and backup vocals. He sings on the Minus 5 box set Scott the Hoople in the Dungeon of Horror on Yep Roc Records along with Ian McLagan, Jeff Tweedy, Mike Mills, Laura Gibson, and other guests.

Casey Neill is also in a Pogues tribute band called K.M.R.I.A. The full band is: Casey Neill, Scott McCaughey, Hanz Araki, Jesse Emerson, Jenny Conlee, Chris Funk, Derek Brown, and Ezra Holbrook. They perform around St Patrick's Day and Christmas in Seattle and Portland and are "heartily endorsed" by James Fearnley of the Pogues.

In 2017, Casey Neill performed a set at the Newport Folk Festival. He was also a part of Speak Out!, a performance of protest songs with the Berklee Gospel and Roots Choir, Billy Bragg, Jim James, Kevin Clark, Kyle Craft, Lucius, Margo Price, Nathaniel Rateliff, Nick Offerman, Preservation Hall Jazz Band, Rayland Baxter, Shakey Graves, Sharon Van Etten, Stephanie Hunt, Zach Williams and a house band made of Carl Broemel and Partick Hallahan of My Morning Jacket, Chris Funk, Jenny Conlee, John Moen, and Nate Query of the Decemberists and Casey Neill. Speak Out! was released on LP for Record Store Day 2018.

In 2018, they released their third official record as Casey Neill & the Norway Rats, Subterrene. All the songs were produced and co-written by their guitarist Jeff "Chet" Lyster and guests on the album include Scott McCaughey, Peter Buck of R.E.M., Dave Depper of Death Cab for Cutie, and Thayer Sarrano. Rolling Stone debuted the stop motion animation video for 'In the Swim'.

Fluff & Gravy Records, Sending Up Flares, and Oregon Music Hall of Fame induction (2023-2025):

In 2023, Casey Neill signed with the Portland, Oregon–based independent label Fluff & Gravy Records to release Sending Up Flares, the fourth studio album by Casey Neill & The Norway Rats. The album marked a stylistic culmination for the band, blending folk, punk, art rock, atmospheric textures, and string arrangements into what has been described as their most cohesive and cathartic work to date.

Created during a period of social and personal uncertainty, Sending Up Flares centers on themes of resilience, human connection, and perseverance. The cinematic title track uses the metaphor of distress flares to explore isolation and collective struggle. The record was co-written with guitarist and producer Chet Lyster and features a range of collaborators from the Pacific Northwest music community.

The Norway Rats’ lineup includes accordionist and keyboardist Jenny Conlee of The Decemberists, guitarist and producer Chet Lyster of Eels, bassist Jesse Emerson of Amelia, and Neill, who has also performed as a member of The Minus 5. Guest appearances on Sending Up Flares include Corin Tucker of Sleater-Kinney, Anita Lee Elliott of Slang, Scott McCaughey, and Peter Buck of R.E.M..

Neill followed Sending Up Flares with the solo album time.zero.land in 2024, also released on Fluff & Gravy Records. Self-produced and largely recorded at home, the album emphasizes Americana and Scots/Irish folk influences, offering a more intimate and acoustic counterpoint to the expansive, genre-blending sound of its predecessor.

In 2025, Neill was inducted as an Artist Inductee into the Oregon Music Hall of Fame.

== Big Bridges ==
Big Bridges was the brainchild of Japanese rock guitarist Takashi O'hashi in collaboration with musicians in Portland, Oregon. Songwriters Casey Neill and Kathryn Claire wrote the lyrics and sang the songs with all the music composed by O'hashi. Bassist Allen Hunter and drummer Derek Brown formed the rhythm section. Big Bridges toured Japan three times in sold-out venues packed by Takashi's devoted fan base. They have been featured on Oregon Public Broadcasting radio show 'State of Wonder' and performed throughout the Pacific Northwest. The songs carry a thematic thread of international travel and relocation that echo the cross cultural nature of the project. They released one full-length record Will to Ascend (2015) and one EP Raise the Periscope (2016).

== The Minus 5 ==
Casey is among the ranks predominantly in the Pacific NW, but sometimes Mexico and Baltimore.

The Minus 5 is a rock/folk/pop collective captained by Scott McCaughey (see: “Scott McCaughey” c/o “The Internet”, for further reliable information), with Peter Buck often aboard as communications officer. By design from its inception, the line-up for recordings and live appearances is completely fluid, dependent on musician availability, whim, and wind direction. Collaborators regularly feature friends from Wilco, The Decemberists, The Posies, and literally hundreds and hundreds of other recalcitrant comrade combos. Everyone gives their all, and no one can be counted on. On Record Store Day, April 19, 2014, the Minus 5 released its ninth official long-player, the all-new five-LP, 57-song, 211-minute set Scott The Hoople In The Dungeon Of Horror, on long-time home Yep Roc Records. The work benefits from the participation of both the usual and new suspects, like John Moen, Jeff Tweedy, Bill Rieflin, Linda Pitmon, Nate Query, Jenny Conlee, Ian McLagan, Laura Gibson, Joe Adragna, Ezra Holbrook, Wesley Stace, Casey Neill, and more. Scott The Hoople's future remains uncertain. As does YOURS.

== Johnny B. Connolly / Casey Neill ==
A duo with Irish accordionist Johnny B Connolly. Focusing on traditional Scots/Irish songs and instrumentals with a few originals in the mix too.

It's been 15 years since Casey Neill and Johnny B. Connolly embarked on a cross country US tour. Fast forward to 2018 and they are together again with songs and instrumentals from the Scots/Irish and American traditions as well as a selection of originals. Johnny Connolly was born and raised in Dublin, Ireland where his dexterity on the accordion earned him a place with the established Celtic ensemble, Anam, at the age of seventeen. For the past few years, Johnny has been touring as a member of internationally acclaimed Irish band Solas and is featured on their latest CD All These Years. Casey Neill is a songwriter and guitarist who tours extensively in the US, Japan, and Europe. He performs solo and with his band The Norway Rats. Neill has a long history in the traditional folk world having worked with masters of Scots/Irish music such as Kevin Burke, Johnny Cunningham, and Martin Hayes.

== Discography ==
- time.zero.land - Fluff & Gravy - July 2024
- Sending Up Flares - Fluff & Gravy - September 2023
- Subterrene - Incident Recordings - January 2018
- All You Pretty Vandals - Incident Recordings - November 2013
- Good Bye to the Rank and File - In Music We Trust Records - 2010
- Brooklyn Bridge - In Music We Trust Records - 2007
- Memory Against Forgetting - Daemon Records - 2005
- Live on 11th Street - self-release - 2004
- Raleigh & Spencer 7" - Broadside Records - 2003
- Portland West - Appleseed Recordings - 2001
- Skree - Appleseed Recordings - 1999
- Casey Neill Appleseed Recordings - 1998
- Riff Raff - Mock Turtle Music - 1996 - out of print
- Pawprints (cassette-only) - 1994 - out of print
- Wooden Shoes (cassette-only) - 1993 - out of print

Compilations (Exclusive Tracks):

- KBOO Pickathon 2003 Live - on "Lucy Campbell and the Jolly Tinker" (reels) with Kevin Burke and "Chinquapin" by Casey Neill with Little Sue and Lewi Longmire.
- Hold Me Up To The Light: A Tribute to Peter Wilde (2003) - on "Carnival" by Peter Wilde with Little Sue
- KBOO Pickathon 2001 Live - on "Kitty" by Casey Neill Trio
- Where Have All the Flowers Gone: the Songs of Pete Seeger (1999) - on "Old Father Hudson/My Dirty Stream" by Casey Neill
