= Land o' Lakes (community), Wisconsin =

Land o' Lakes, Wisconsin
- Unincorporated community
- Location within Wisconsin Location within the United States
- Coordinates: 46°09′41″N 89°13′07″W
- Country: United States
- State: Wisconsin
- County: Vilas
- Elevation: 1,703 ft (519 m)
- Time zone: UTC-6 (Central (CST))
  - Summer (DST): UTC-5 (CDT)
- Area codes: 715 & 534
- GNIS feature ID: 1579623

Land o' Lakes is an unincorporated community in Vilas County, Wisconsin, United States. It is located in the Town of Land o' Lakes on US Highway 45. The community is located along the state line with Michigan; in the past, it has also been called Donaldson and State Line (also spelled Stateline).

== Education ==
Land o' Lakes is part of the Northland Pines School District and has an elementary school that serves students in kindergarten through fifth grade. Students travel to the nearby city of Eagle River, Wisconsin for middle school and high school. Conserve School, a private semester school for high school juniors that focuses on environmental stewardship and outdoor activities, is located in the community.

== Notable residents ==
- Wendy Lansbach, Olympic gold medal swimmer
