= Land o' Lakes, Wisconsin =

- Town
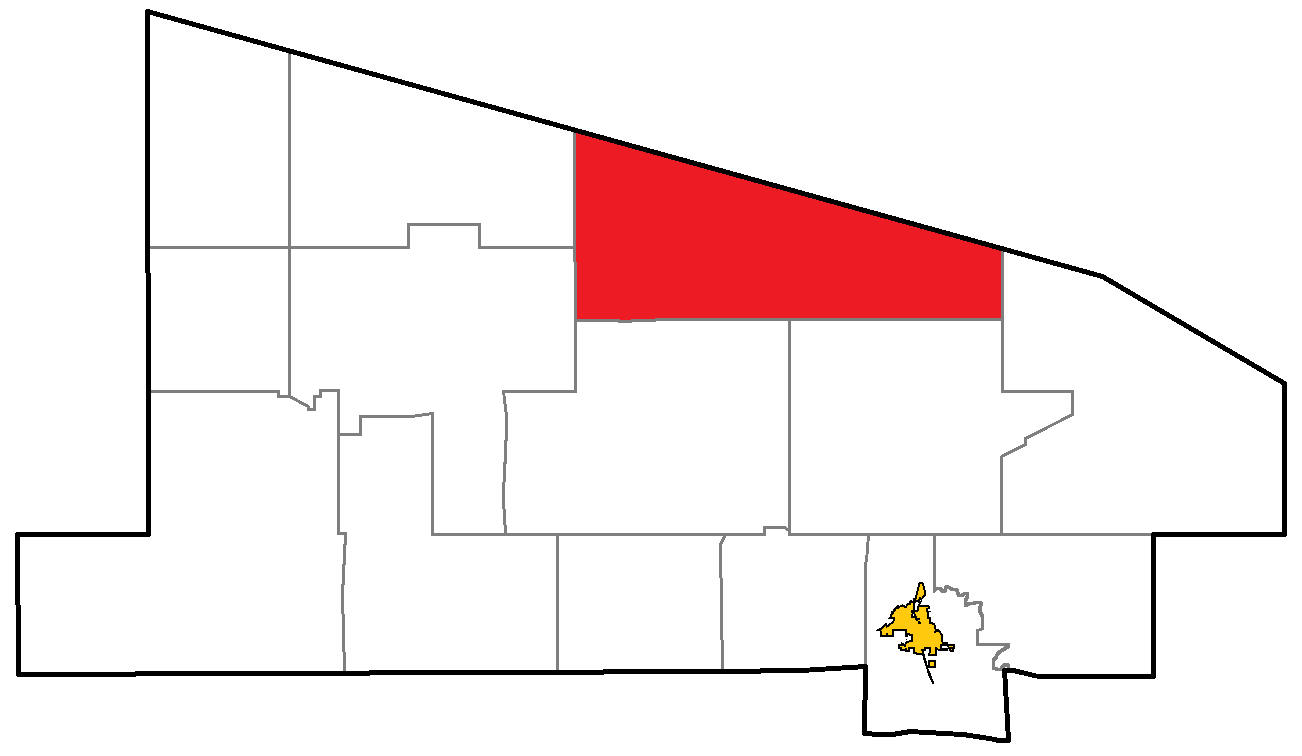
- Location of Land o'Lakes, within Vilas County

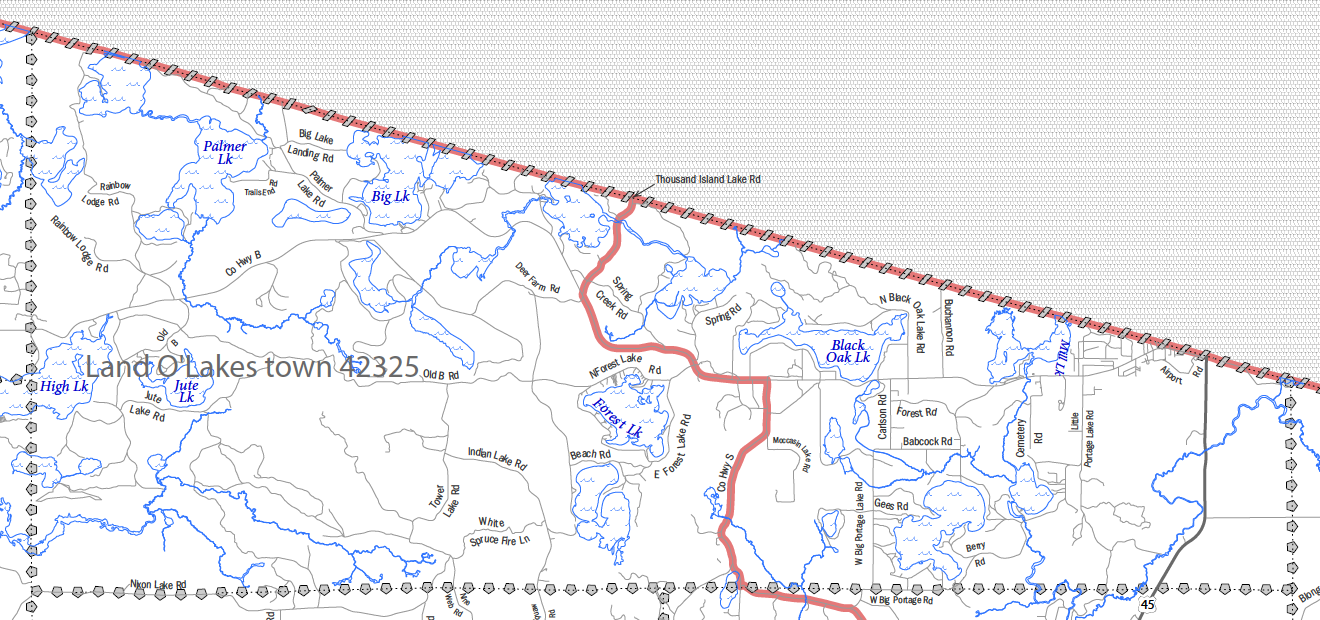
- 2010 Town of Land o' Lakes map

- Location within Wisconsin Land o' Lakes (the United States)
- Coordinates: 46°9′17″N 89°23′7″W
- Country: United States
- State: Wisconsin
- County: Vilas

Area
  - Total: 95.3 sq mi (246.8 km^{2})
  - Land: 83.1 sq mi (215.2 km^{2})
  - Water: 12.2 sq mi (31.7 km^{2})
- Elevation: 1,755 ft (535 m)

Population (2020)
  - Total: 944
  - Density: 11.4/sq mi (4.39/km^{2})
- Time zone: UTC-6 (Central (CST))
  - Summer (DST): UTC-5 (CDT)
- Area codes: 715 & 534
- FIPS code: 55-42325
- GNIS feature ID: 1583525
- Website: https://landolakeswi.gov/

Land o' Lakes is a town in Vilas County, Wisconsin, United States. The population was 944 according to the 2020 census. The unincorporated community of Land o' Lakes is located in the town.

== History ==
On January 4, 1907, the Town of State Line was created. On April 28, 1948, the name of the town was changed to the Town of Land o' Lakes.

== Geography ==
The Town of Land o' Lakes is located in north-central Vilas County along the border with the Upper Peninsula of Michigan. The headwaters of a branch of the Ontonagon River is located in the town at the Cisco Chain of lakes, and the upper part of the Wisconsin River flows through the town, with the headwaters being located just to the east at Lac Vieux Desert. According to the United States Census Bureau, the town has a total area of 95.3 square miles (246.9 km^{2}) of which 83.1 square miles (215.2 km^{2}) is land and 12.2 square miles (31.7 km^{2}) (12.83%) is water. The town is very long and narrow, with the town center, government offices, and most services located in the unincorporated community of Land o' Lakes at the far eastern end of the town.

== Demographics ==
At the 2010 census, there were 861 people, 433 households and 264 families residing in the town. The population density was 10.6 per square mile (4.1/km^{2}). There were 1,337 housing units at an average density of 16.1 per square mile (6.2/km^{2}). The racial makeup of the town was 98.41% White, 0.68% Native American, 0.34% Asian, 0.45% from other races, and 0.11% from two or more races. Hispanic or Latino of any race were 0.45% of the population.

There were 433 households, of which 14.5% had children under the age of 18 living with them, 48.5% were married couples living together, 5.3% had a female householder with no husband present, and 43.6% were non-families. 37.2% of all households were made up of individuals, and 16.0% had someone living alone who was 65 years of age or older. The average household size was 1.99 and the average family size was 2.57.

Age distribution was 13.5% under the age of 18, 7.0% from 15 to 24, 15.2% from 25 to 44, 38.3% from 45 to 64, and 28.9% who were 65 years of age or older. The median age was 54 years. For every 100 males there were 88.4 females.

The median household income was $29,792, and the median family income was $40,938. Males had a median income of $30,357 versus $21,250 for females. The per capita income for the town was $18,765. About 5.5% of families and 7.5% of the population were below the poverty line, including 3.2% of those under age 18 and 5.9% of those age 65 or over.

== Education ==
Most of Land o' Lakes is part of the Northland Pines School District and there is an elementary school that serves students from kindergarten to fifth grade in the unincorporated community of Land o' Lakes. Students travel to the nearby city of Eagle River, Wisconsin, for middle school and high school. Conserve School, a private semester school for high school juniors that focuses on environmental stewardship and outdoor activities, is located on the shore of Black Oak Lake. Some students in far southwestern parts of the Town attend North Lakeland Elementary School and Lakeland Union High School.

== Transportation ==
=== Roads and highways ===
The Town of Land o' Lakes is served by US Highway 45/State Trunk Highway 32 (US 45/STH-32), and three county trunk highways. US 45/STH-32 runs north-south in the eastern part of the town, serving the unincorporated community of Land o' Lakes. It proceeds northward into the Upper Peninsula of Michigan to Watersmeet and a connection to US 2. US 45 proceeds southward through Conover to Eagle River and points south. STH-32 begins at the Michigan border and proceeds southward concurrently with US 45. CTH-B runs the length of the town and serves as the main street of the unincorporated community of Land o' Lakes. It proceeds west to Presque Isle and a connection with M-64. CTH-B meets CTH-M—which provides access to Boulder Junction. CTH-S proceeds south from a junction with CTH-B approximately five miles (8.0 km) from the unincorporated community of Land o' Lakes and serves the areas around Clair and Joyce lakes before entering the Town of Conover. CTH-E proceeds eastward from a junction with US 45/STH-32 in the southeastern corner of the town and provides access to Lac Vieux Desert and Phelps, where it meets STH-17. Thousand Island Lake Road—a town road—provides a southern entrance to the Sylvania Wilderness.

=== Airport ===
Land o' Lakes is served by Kings Land o' Lakes Airport (KLNL). Located in the southeast corner of the town, the airport handles approximately 8,000 operations per year, with roughly 99% general aviation and 1% air taxi. The airport has a 4,001 foot asphalt runway with approved GPS approaches (Runway 14–32).

== Notable people ==
- Wendy Lansbach Boglioli, Olympic gold medal swimmer, grew up in Land o' Lakes

== Climate ==
The climate is described as Humid Continental by the Köppen Climate System, abbreviated as Dfb.

Climate data for Land o' Lakes, Wisconsin
| Month | Jan | Feb | Mar | Apr | May | Jun | Jul | Aug | Sep | Oct | Nov | Dec | Year |
|---|---|---|---|---|---|---|---|---|---|---|---|---|---|
| Mean daily maximum °C (°F) | −7 (19) | −7 (20) | 1 (34) | 9 (49) | 18 (64) | 24 (75) | 26 (78) | 23 (74) | 19 (67) | 12 (54) | 3 (37) | −4 (25) | 10 (50) |
| Mean daily minimum °C (°F) | −20 (−4) | −19 (−2) | −13 (8) | −4 (25) | 2 (36) | 8 (47) | 11 (51) | 9 (48) | 5 (41) | 1 (33) | −7 (19) | −14 (6) | −3 (26) |
| Average precipitation mm (inches) | 36 (1.4) | 28 (1.1) | 48 (1.9) | 64 (2.5) | 89 (3.5) | 110 (4.2) | 110 (4.5) | 100 (4) | 94 (3.7) | 76 (3) | 56 (2.2) | 41 (1.6) | 850 (33.6) |
Source: Weatherbase
