= Theopolis =

Theopolis may refer to:

- Theopolis, Justinian I's name for Antioch
- Theopolis, a monastic domain established by Claudius Postumus Dardanus
- Dr. Theopolis, a character in the Buck Rogers in the 25th Century (TV series)
- Dr. Theopolis (band), a Portland-based funk band named from the TV character
- Theopolis, the name of a 1672 book written by Henry Danvers (Baptist)
