= KLNL =

KLNL may refer to:

- Kings Land o' Lakes Airport (ICAO code KLNL)
- KLNL-LD, a low-power television station (channel 14) licensed to serve College Station, Texas, United States; see List of television stations in Texas
