= Shady Side Academy =

Prep school in Pittsburgh, Pennsylvania, US

Location
- 423 Fox Chapel Road; Pittsburgh, Pennsylvania 15238-2296; United States

Information
- School type: Independent boarding & day college-preparatory school
- Motto: Latin: Fide Semper Vincere} (Faith Always Conquers)
- Religious affiliation: Nonsectarian
- Established: 1883; 143 years ago
- Status: Open
- CEEB code: 393901
- NCES School ID: 01631942
- President: Bartley P. Griffith Jr.
- Chair: Robert Shannon Mullin
- Grades: PK–12
- Gender: Coeducational
- Enrollment: 1,260 (2024-2025)
- Student to teacher ratio: 7.5
- Hours in school day: 9.5
- Campuses: 4
- Campus size: 200 acres (81 ha)
- Colors: Old gold & navy
- Athletics conference: PIAA, WPIAL
- Nickname: Bulldogs
- Accreditation: MSA, NAIS, TABS
- Newspaper: The Shady Side Academy News
- Yearbook: Academian
- Endowment: $61.28 million
- Annual tuition: $39,000 (day) $66,500 (boarding)
- Revenue: $61 million
- Nobel laureates: Philip Showalter Hench
- Website: www.shadysideacademy.org

Shady Side Academy is an independent preparatory school in Fox Chapel, Pennsylvania in Greater Pittsburgh. Founded in 1883 as an all-male night school in the Shadyside neighborhood of Pittsburgh, the academy now offers a secular coeducational PK–12 program on four campuses in the city and its suburbs, including a boarding program in the Croft and Morewood Houses of its Senior School Campus.

Formed to provide for the education of the sons of newly moneyed industrialists of Pittsburgh's East End, the academy counts the Frick and Mellon families among its early patrons. In 1922, the academy expanded to its sprawling Georgian Senior School campus in the then-countryside of Fox Chapel under the influence of the Country Day School movement. The academy merged with the Arnold School in 1940 to form its Junior School campus and added its stone Tudor manor-style Middle School campus in 1958, emerging in its current three-school system. The academy admitted its first female students in 1973.

Shady Side Academy enrolls approximately one thousand students annually and is a member of the National Association of Independent Schools and the Association of Boarding Schools. The school is a member of the Chewonki Foundation's Maine Coast Semester in Wiscasset, Maine and the High Mountain Institute's HMI Semester in Leadville, Colorado, and sends a significant number of students to both programs annually.

== History ==
The first Shady Side Academy building: a one-room red brick schoolhouse in the Shadyside neighborhood, 1883

Shady Side Academy was founded as an all-male day school in 1883, on Aiken Avenue in the East End neighborhood of Shadyside, Pittsburgh. In 1922, the Senior School was established on its current suburban campus in Fox Chapel. This move also resulted in Shady Side becoming a boarding school, first with a traditional seven-day program and, later, with the school's weekday program.

A later merger in the early 1940s with another local boys' private school, The Arnold School, resulted in the creation of another new campus: a Junior School, located in Pittsburgh's Point Breeze and serving Pre-kindergarten through fifth grade students.

In the 1950s, the academy purchased an estate less than a mile from the Senior School campus, creating a middle school for grades six through eight.

In 1973, the Senior School embraced the concept of co-education. It began admitting female students (popularly referred to, particularly in newspapers, as "The Shady Ladies") for the first time. The Junior and Middle Schools followed suit in the 1990s, with the first K-12 "Lifer" female students graduating in 2007. The last all-male class at the academy was the Middle School Form II (eighth grade) class of 1998, which became co-educated upon entering the Senior School in 1999. It was also the last class at the Middle School to follow the tie-and-jacket dress code.

Opening in the fall of 2007, Shady Side added a pre-kindergarten located on the Junior School campus. The total enrollment across all grades fluctuates but is generally about 1,000 students, with about 500 enrolled in the Senior School (grades 9-12 or "Forms" III-VI).

In recent years, the school has worked to implement "green," or environmentally friendly, changes to its campuses. The 2006 renovation of Rowe Hall, the main academic building, uses several "green" concepts. The $6.8 million renovation of this primary Senior School facility emphasized environmentally friendly approaches, from glass that lets more light into classrooms (helping the building maintain lower electricity usage) to rainwater collected in an underground cistern and used to flush toilets and urinals. In the fall of 2007, the Rowe Hall Complex earned Gold LEED (Leadership in Energy and Environmental Design) Certification, becoming the only high school in the Commonwealth of Pennsylvania to have done so.

The McIlroy Center for Science and Innovation opened in 2018 as the new home of the Senior School Science Department. The building's construction was made possible by the fundraising efforts of The Campaign for Shady Side. The Mcllroy Center is a Gold LEED-certified "green" building with sustainable features that reduce environmental impact while creating teaching opportunities, such as a rooftop solar array and monitoring system, and a rain garden to collect storm runoff. The Glimcher Tech & Design Hub, a dynamic facility dedicated to innovation, creativity, technology, and design, opened at the Senior School in September 2019. The 12,000-square-foot space includes three primary areas: a Fabrication and Robotics Wing, a Computer Science Wing, and a café. The facility is on the lower levels of Rowe and Memorial Halls, in the space formerly occupied by the Science Department before the department moved to the new McIlroy Center for Science & Innovation in 2018.

== Admissions ==
=== Demographics ===
Enrollment by Race/Ethnicity 2019–2020
White	Asian	Multiracial	Black	Hispanic	Native Hawaiian/ Pacific Islander
579	171	104	65	9	1

=== Financial aid ===
In 2013, over $2.8 million in need-based financial aid was distributed to 159 students. In 2019, Shady Side received the second-largest gift in its 136-year history, a $5.2 million gift to the financial aid endowment.

== Curriculum ==
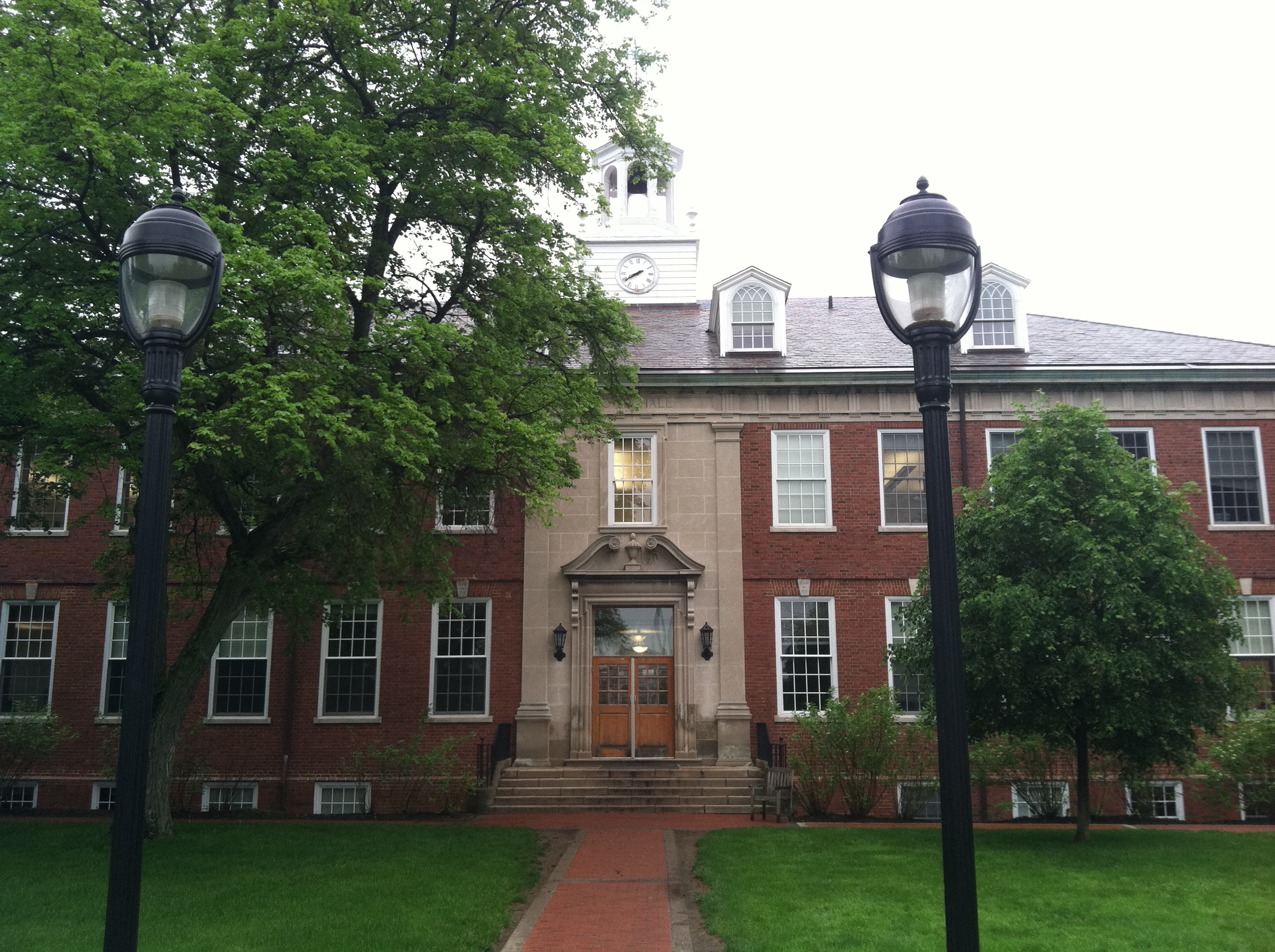
Rowe Hall, the LEED-certified main academic and administrative building of the Senior School campus

Academic life at Shady Side Academy operates on a trimester system, dividing the year into three thirteen to fourteen-week terms. Classes begin each year before Labor Day with Convocation in late August and finish with Commencement exercises in early June. The Second Term begins in late November, and the Third Term begins in early April. At the Senior School, regular classes begin each day at 8:15 a.m. and end at 3:00 p.m., punctuated by a late-morning assembly period. All-school assemblies occur every Monday and Friday in the Hillman Center's Rauh Theater. Every Wednesday, students meet with their advisory groups. The academic day is divided into six periods, including at least five classes, a lunch period, and intermittent free periods. Athletic practices follow the school day from 3:45 p.m. to late afternoon. An eight-day rotating schedule determines class periods.

Each term, students enroll in a minimum of five classes, both year-long courses and one-term electives, taught by seven academic departments—Arts, Computer Science, English, History, Mathematics, Science, and World Languages. Many departments, particularly the English and History Departments, make extensive use of the Harkness table, as most rooms in Rowe have large, oval tables. This teaching style is similar to the Socratic method. Students receive midterm grade reports during the year's first term and subsequently after each term, followed by a cumulative grade report at the end of the year. The grade for each class has three parts: a letter grade, an effort grade, and a paragraph of written remarks. The quality grade, assigned on the A+ (4.3333) to F (0.0) scale, is used to calculate the student's GPA. Effort grades for each class consist of a number from 5, indicating "exemplary effort," to 1, indicating "unacceptable effort." Effort grades of 2—"inconsistent effort"— or below result in a student's placement on Academic Warning and likely an interim report to the student's parents. The academy uses the student's GPA and effort grades each term and at the end of the year to award academic Year and Term Honors, ranging from "Honors" (B+ average) to "Highest Honors" (A average), as well as other school and departmental prizes. Established in 1929, Shady Side Academy's chapter of the Cum Laude Society elects members from the top fifth of the graduating class based on academic performance in the junior year and the first two terms of the senior year.

=== Boarding program and residential life ===
Boarding at Shady Side Academy dates back to the school's relocation from the Shadyside neighborhood in the 1920s. The number of boarding students living on campus and the number of buildings serving as dormitories have fluctuated over the academy's history. Four buildings on the Senior School campus—Bayard House (1924), Croft House (1931), Ellsworth House (1922) (now Hunt Hall), and Morewood House (1922)—all served as residence halls at one point in the school's history. The names of Bayard, Morewood, and Ellsworth Houses reference three out of the four streets encircling the site of the academy's original campus, now the site of the Winchester Thurston School. At one time, nearly 200 students, both Senior and Middle School, boarded full-time in a seven-day program. In the 1960s, the academy transitioned to housing Senior School students in a five-day boarding program, becoming one of six schools nationwide to offer such a program. Because students spend weekends at home, boarders almost always came from the three-state area of eastern Ohio, western Pennsylvania, and northern West Virginia. In the fall of 2014, the academy announced it would start offering a seven-day boarding option beginning in 2015, in addition to its current five-day boarding program. Shady Side's boarding program now hosts approximately fifty students every year in two residence halls—Croft House, the boys' dormitory, and Morewood House, the girls' dormitory. The academy also houses residential faculty representing almost every academic department, both in apartments in the dormitories and homes on the Senior and Middle School campuses.

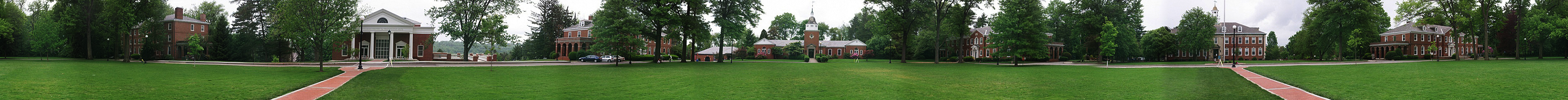
The main residential quadrangle on the Senior School campus. Pictured from left to right are Croft House, the Hillman Center for Performing Arts, Bayard House, the Benedum Visual Arts Center, McCune Dining Hall, Morewood House, Rowe Hall, and Hunt Hall

== Extracurricular activities ==
Student-run clubs at Shady Side exist as collaborations between students and a sponsoring faculty member. Numerous language clubs exist in collaboration with language programs offered by the World Languages Department, including German, Spanish, and French clubs, as well as clubs for languages not taught at Shady Side, such as the Italian Club. Nationality clubs, such as the Jewish Student Union and Black Student Union, celebrate various global cultures and often present performances during the academy's annual GlobalFest week. There are also many established service and philanthropic clubs, such as Service Learning and Meals on Wheels. There are also religious clubs, activist clubs, academic competition teams, student government organizations, performance groups, departmental programs such as the peer-tutoring Scribe Office for writing, and publications.

=== Academic ===
Shady Side participates in Model United Nations conferences, National Academic Quiz Tournaments and other quiz bowl competitions, the Western Pennsylvania Math League, Science Olympiad, North American Computational Linguistics Open competition, National Science Bowl, and forensics competitions, principally in the National Speech and Debate Association.

The Pittsburgh Japanese School (ピッツバーグ日本語補習授業校 Pittsubāgu Nihongo Hoshū Jugyō Kō), a weekend supplementary Japanese school, uses the middle school facilities of Shady Side Academy. The school, established in 1993, originated from a group of parents starting a Japanese class system in 1977.

=== Arts, theater, and music ===
Since 2003, Shady Side has sponsored a benefit concert called "Untucked"—an homage to the school dress code, which, before 2004, required all shirts to be tucked in. Members of the Untucked Committee include students selected annually from a competitive applicant pool and a faculty member. Recent bands to appear at Untucked include Rusted Root, The Clarks, Robert Randolph and the Family Band, Better than Ezra, and Sister Hazel. Untucked is usually held at the end of the year in the Roy McKnight Hockey Center and includes food and carnival games.

Shady Side Academy's main theater, the 650-seat Richard E. Rauh Theater, is named after the local teacher, actor, and arts patron Richard Rauh. It resides in the newly constructed Hillman Center for Performing Arts on the Senior School campus.

== Athletics ==
The insignia of Shady Side Academy athletics

=== Mascot ===
Shady Side Academy's athletic teams formerly competed as the Indians. Once known simply as the Blue & Gold, the Indians' name replaced the original in the 1940s. Attempts to change the mascot due to conflict over the propriety of Native American images as athletic mascots, were long thwarted by various alumni, who argued for the academy's unique claim to its use, owing to Chief Guyasuta's historical encampment on the land now occupied by the Senior School. As of July 1, 2020, the board of trustees voted unanimously to retire the mascot and cease using Indians as a team name. Later that year, the board announced that the Bulldogs would be the new team name and mascot.

=== History ===
Shady Side Academy's all-male hockey team in the early 20th century

Athletic activity and physical education at the academy originated with the school's 1885 relocation from its original one-room schoolhouse on Aiken Avenue to a more spacious physical plant on Ellsworth Avenue, which included athletic fields and a gymnasium. The academy's early athletic program was organized to promote the ideals of its day, particularly amateurism in sport and the spirit of Muscular Christianity. Team sports, initially informal organizations of students and occasionally faculty, became increasingly structured as the academy developed athletic links and interscholastic competitions with nearby public and private secondary schools and, occasionally, colleges such as Washington & Jefferson College and what is now Duquesne University. To further formalize interscholastic competition, in 1907, the academy collaborated with Fifth Avenue High School, Allegheny Prep, and Pittsburgh Central High School to found the Western Pennsylvania Interscholastic Athletic League (WPIAL), which served to establish "a set of eligibility rules and regulations to ensure a level playing field for interscholastic athletic competition among the schools in western Pennsylvania."

The academy maintained its WPIAL affiliation until 1924, when it withdrew from the league and collaborated with the University School of Cleveland, Ohio and Nichols School of Buffalo, New York to found the Tri-State Preparatory League. This league later added the Cranbrook School in Bloomfield Hills, Michigan, Western Reserve Academy in Hudson, Ohio, The Kiski School in Saltsburg, Pennsylvania, and the Linsly School in Wheeling, West Virginia, and in the mid-1930s began calling itself the Inter-State Preparatory League (IPSL). After seventy years of competition for the annual "Championship Cup," Shady Side Academy withdrew from the "crumbling" IPSL in 1993.

=== Affiliations ===
Since 1994, the academy has been a member of the WPIAL, which contains hundreds of other public and private secondary schools in western Pennsylvania and serves as District 7 of the Pennsylvania Interscholastic Athletic Association (PIAA), a state-level athletic governing body. Although most teams now compete at the varsity level in the WPIAL and PIAA, a minority of programs maintain prep-level affiliations with smaller, sport-specific Prep Leagues that include other regional independent schools. The boys' prep hockey team served as a founding member of the Midwest Prep Hockey League in 1990, where it competes at the Division I level. It also occasionally plays semi-professional hockey clubs in Germany and Italy, including ESV Kaufbeuren, SV Kaltern, and EV Landsberg. The girls hockey team also competes at the prep level in the Women's Interscholastic Hockey League of the Mid-Atlantic. The boys and girls squash teams, members of the Pittsburgh Squash Racquet Association, are also prep-level teams composed of top-rated junior players.

== Campuses ==
Shady Side Academy has four campuses in Pittsburgh with almost 200 acres (81 ha), predominantly in heavily wooded Fox Chapel. Shady Side Academy operates twenty-six campus buildings with a total estimated facilities value of $56.2 million.

- Upper School: (Grades 7–12) 423 Fox Chapel Road, Pittsburgh 40.5225°N 79.88278°W
- Junior School: (Grades Pre-K to 5) 400 S. Braddock Avenue, Pittsburgh 40.444000°N 79.896988°W
- Country Day School: (Grades Pre-K to 5) 400 Christ Church Lane, Pittsburgh 40.52648°N 79.89302°W

== Notable alumni ==
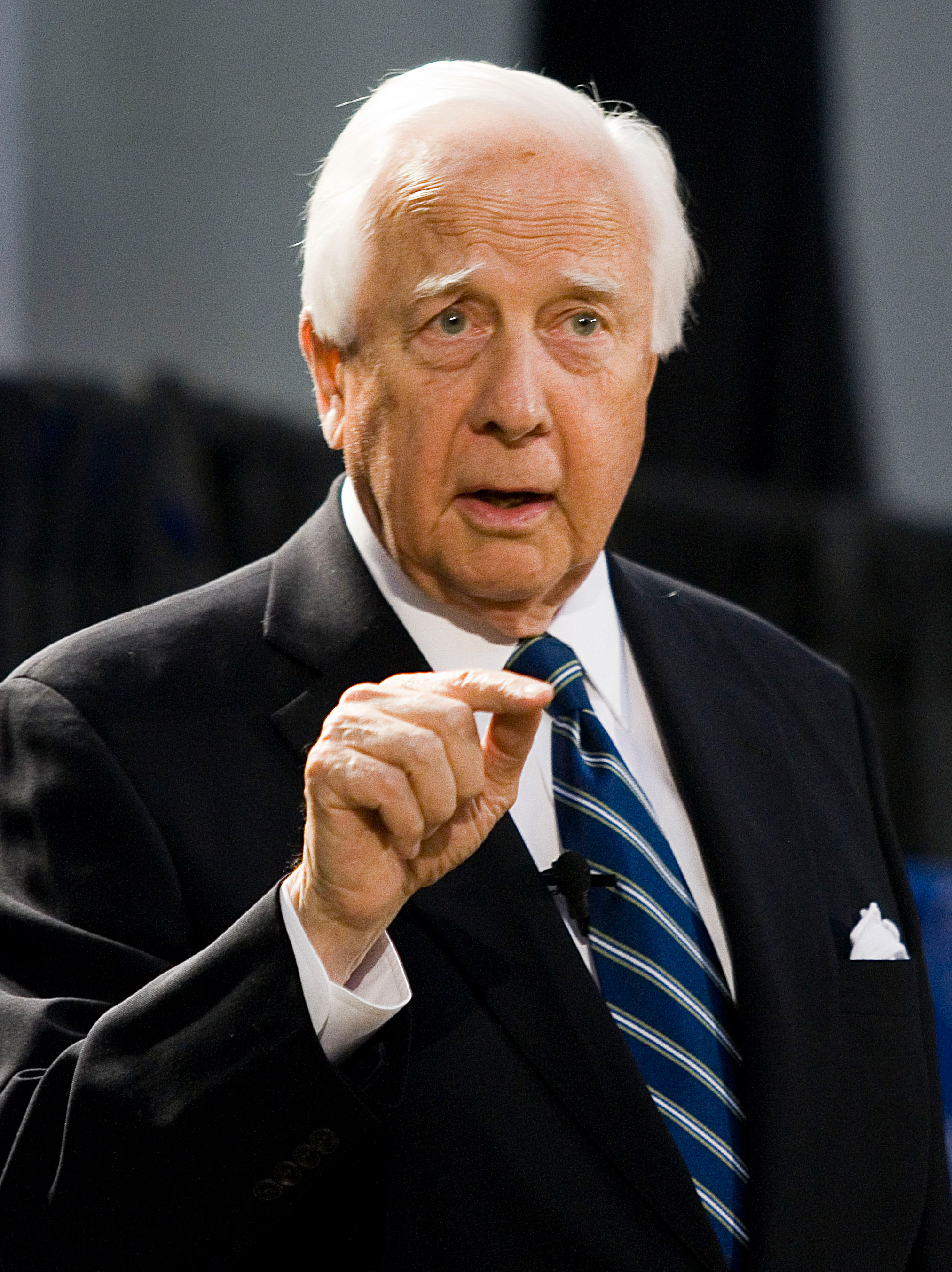
David McCullough '51, two-time Pulitzer Prize-winning historian

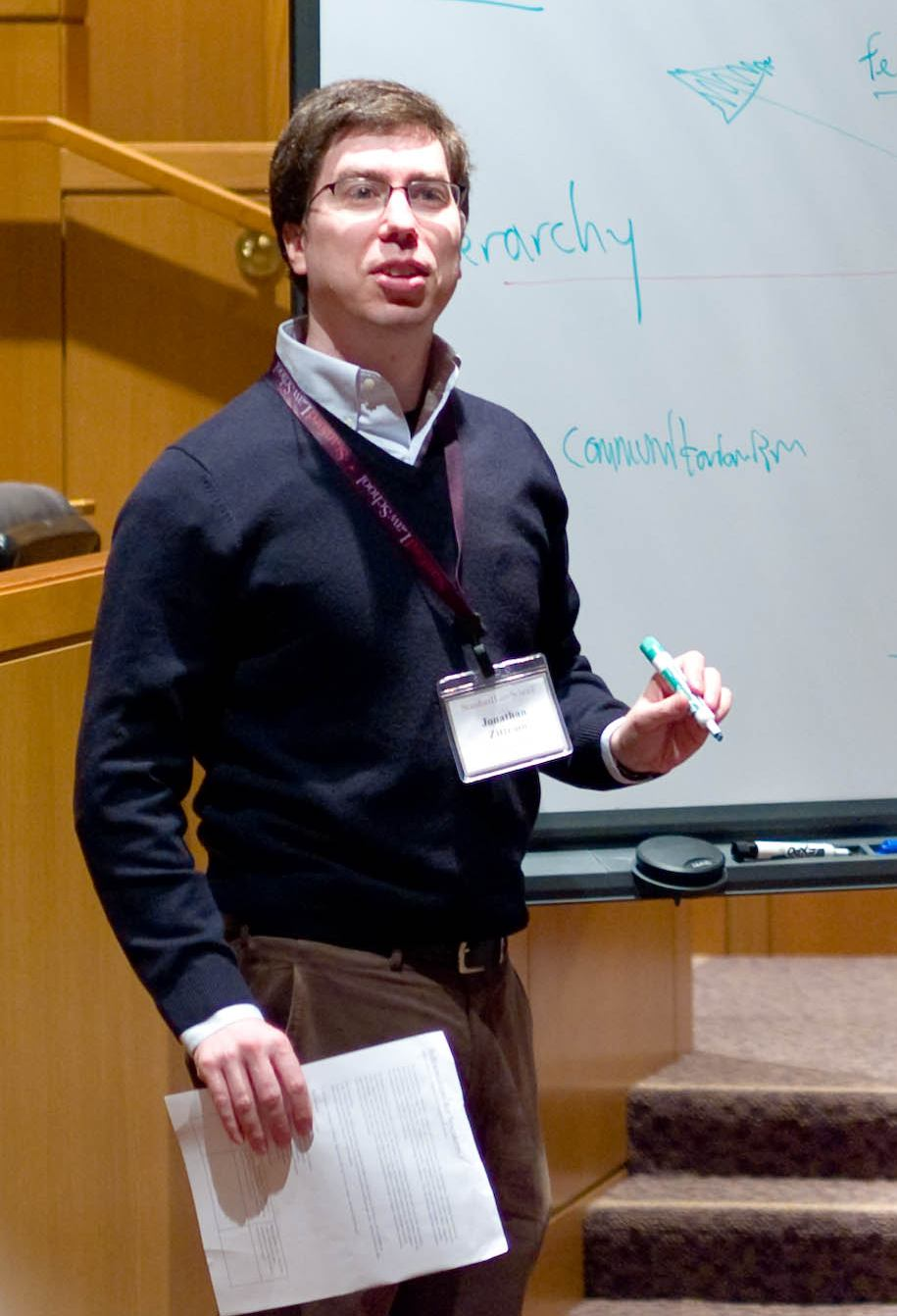
Jonathan Zittrain '87, professor at Harvard Law School

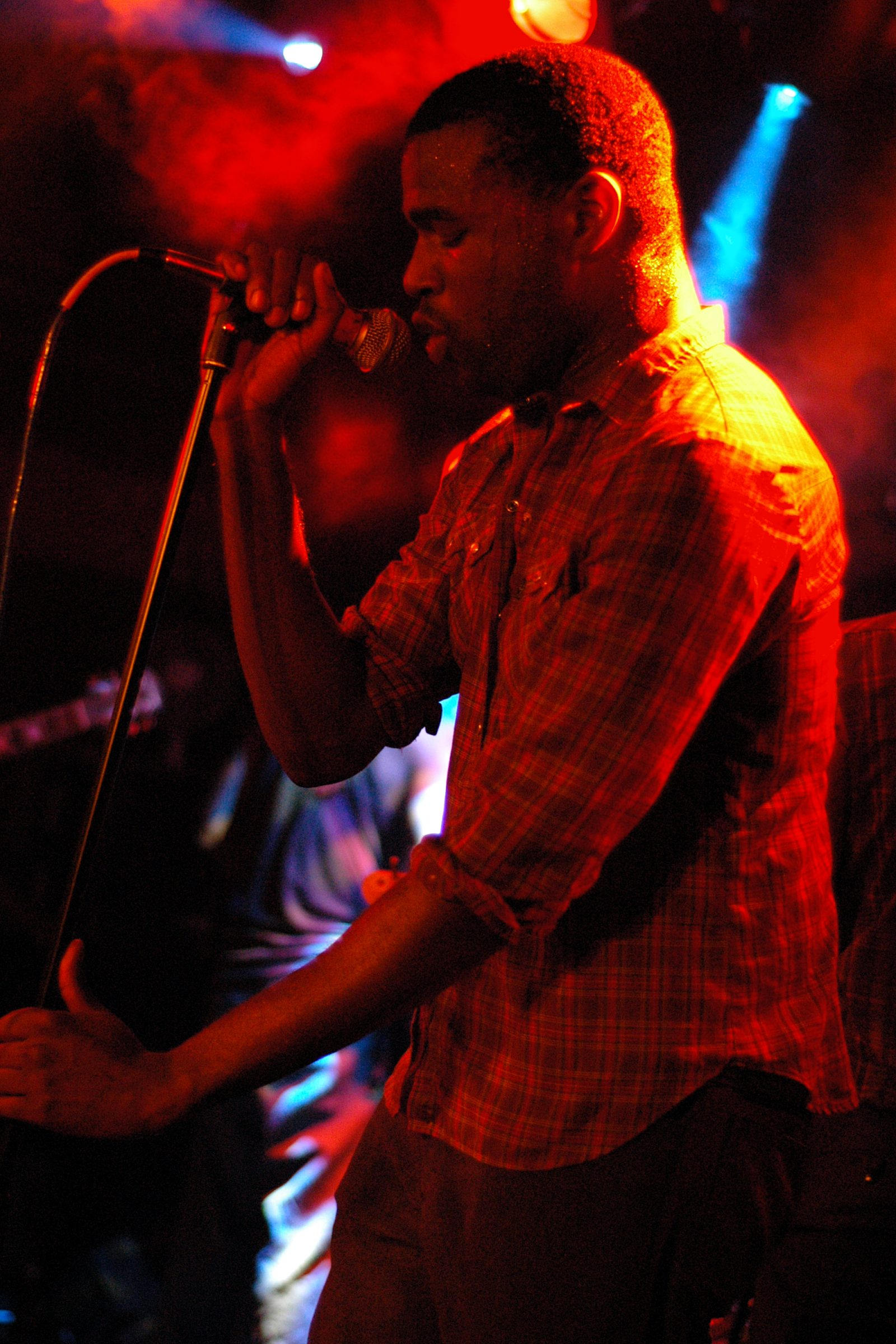
Tunde Adebimpe '93, lead singer of TV on the Radio

- Tunde Adebimpe (1993), actor, director, and lead singer of the alternative rock band TV on the Radio
- Peter Ackerman (1988), Hollywood screenwriter on the animated film Ice Age voice actor on Ice Age and Ice Age: The Meltdown, co-executive producer The Americans and The Diplomat
- Hervey Allen (1909), author of many works of fiction and nonfiction, including most famously the 1933 novel Anthony Adverse
- Jerome "Jay" Apt (1967), astronaut on the Space Shuttle Atlantis
- Eugene Baker (1994), former NFL wide receiver
- Jon Beckerman (1987), producer and creator of NBC comedy-drama Ed and ABC comedy The Knights of Prosperity
- Scott Booker (1999), professional football coach in the National Football League (NFL)
- Christian Borle (1991), Tony Award winner for featured actor in a play ("Peter and the Starcatcher", 2012) and Drama Desk Award-nominated Broadway actor. Starred in the NBC drama Smash.
- Richard G. Colbert (1933), U.S. Navy four-star admiral
- Charlie Cheever (1999), co-founder of Quora
- Jon Daly (1989), actor, comedian, writer, and producer
- Dave Dameshek (1988), American television writer and radio personality
- Tim DeChristopher (2000), environmental activist and founder of environmental group Peaceful Uprising.
- Thomas Mellon Evans (1927), financier and one of the early corporate raiders
- Chris Frantz (1970), drummer for Talking Heads
- Childs Frick (1901), invertebrate paleontologist and son of Pittsburgh industrialist Henry Clay Frick
- Carmen Gentile (1992), journalist, author, and public speaker
- Bartley P. Griffith (1966), internationally renowned surgeon; performed the first heart transplant from a genetically modified pig to a human patient; invented the first "out of hospital" artificial lung
- Kerry Hannon (1978), writer for U.S. News & World Report and USA Today
- Henry Hillman (1937), American billionaire businessman, investor, civic leader, and philanthropist
- Philip Hench (1912), winner of the Nobel Prize for Medicine in 1950
- Edgar J. Kaufmann (1903), businessman and philanthropist, owner of Kaufmann's Department Store, and commissioner of Frank Lloyd Wright's Fallingwater in the Laurel Highlands
- Zachary D. Kaufman (1996), law professor, political scientist, and social entrepreneur
- Thornton Oakley (1897), artist, illustrator, and travel writer for Harper's Magazine and Scribner's Magazine
- David A. Reed (1896), Pennsylvania United States senator from 1922 to 1935
- Philip B. Heymann (1950), Harvard Law School professor, federal prosecutor, Associate Special Counsel in Watergate investigations, Deputy Attorney General
- Richard Isay, psychiatrist, psychoanalyst, author, gay activist
- Carl Kurlander (1978), Hollywood screenwriter of the film St. Elmo's Fire and NBC sitcom Saved by the Bell
- Benjamin Lawsky (1988), New York State's first Superintendent of Financial Services, Chief of Staff to NY Governor Andrew Cuomo
- Aarti Mann (1996), television actress on CBS sitcom The Big Bang Theory
- Bill Marsh (1976), New Hampshire state representative for Carroll County's 8th district
- Paul Martha (1960), NFL football player for the Pittsburgh Steelers and Denver Broncos
- Lenny McAllister (1989), 2016 Republican nominee for US House of Representatives in Pittsburgh (PA 14th), political commentator, and activist
- David McCullough (1951), two-time Pulitzer Prize-winning author and historian
- Skyy Moore (2019), NFL Receiver, Green Bay Packers
- Candace Otto (1998), operatic soprano and Miss Pennsylvania 2003
- David Puth (1974), financial services executive
- William Schulz (1967), executive director of Amnesty International USA, the U.S. division of Amnesty International, from March 1994 to 2006
- John B. Taylor (1964), Under Secretary of the Treasury for the George H. W. Bush administration
- David Wecht (1980), Associate Justice of the Supreme Court of Pennsylvania
- Christian K. Wedemeyer (1986), elected official of the Illinois Green Party and professor of the history of religions at the University of Chicago
- Bari Weiss (2002), New York Times former opinion writer and staff editor. Founder, The Free Press, 2021. Editor in Chief, CBS News, 2025
- Tom Vilsack (1968), 40th governor of Iowa and 30th and 32nd Secretary of Agriculture
- Jonathan Zittrain (1987), co-founder the Berkman Center for Internet & Society at Harvard Law School and Professor of Internet Governance and Regulation, Oxford University
