= Egil Krogh =

American lawyer and Watergate figure (1939–2020)

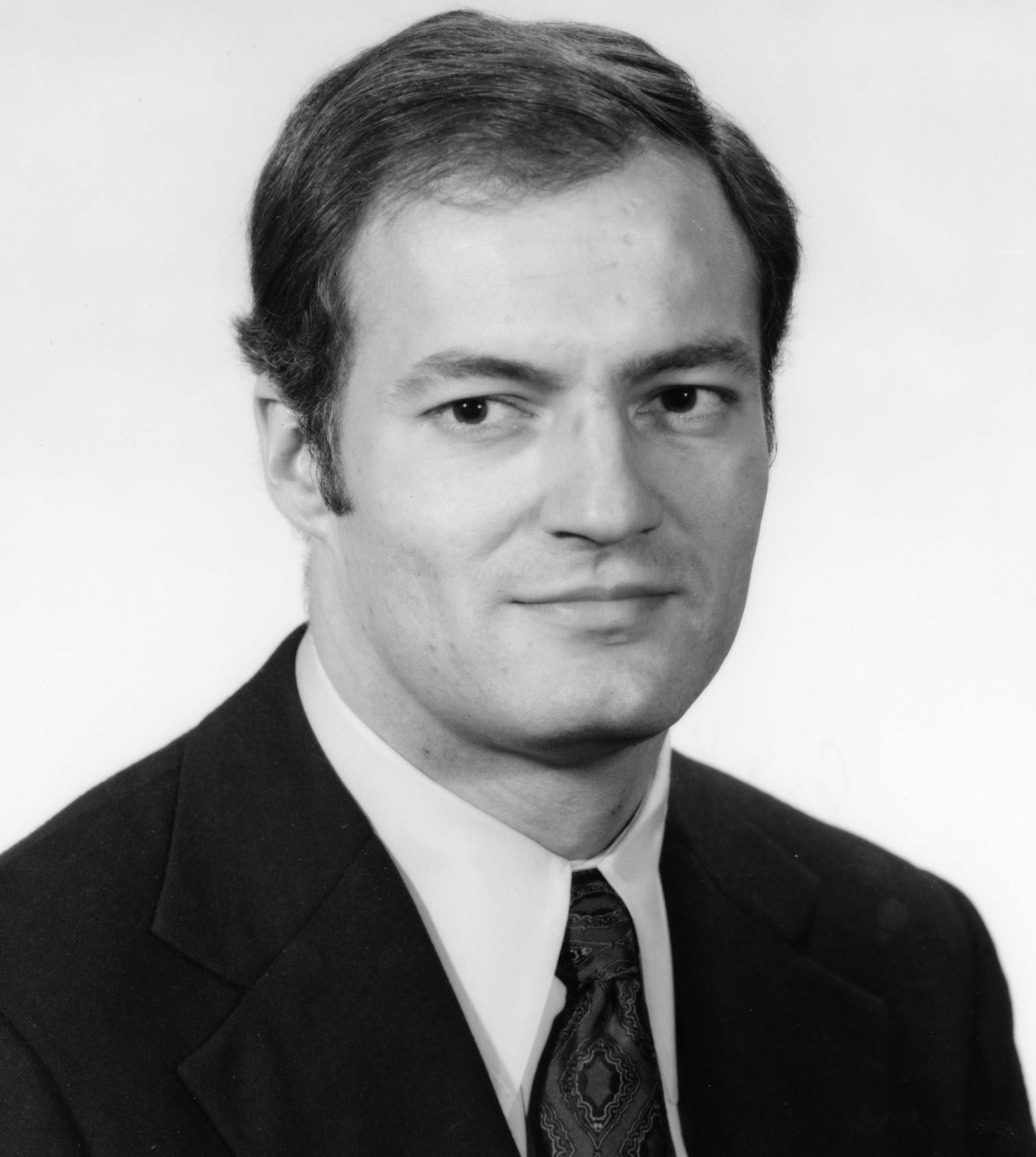

United States Under Secretary of Transportation
- In office February 2, 1973 – May 9, 1973
- President: Richard Nixon
- Preceded by: James Beggs
- Succeeded by: John Barnum

Personal details
- Born: August 3, 1939 Chicago, Illinois, U.S.
- Died: January 18, 2020 (aged 80) Washington, D.C., U.S.
- Party: Republican
- Education: Principia College (BA); University of Washington (JD)

Egil "Bud" Krogh Jr. (/ɛɡɪl kroʊɡ/; August 3, 1939 – January 18, 2020) was an American lawyer who became infamous as an official of the Nixon administration and who was imprisoned for his part in the Watergate scandal. He was a Senior Fellow on Ethics and Leadership at the Center for the Study of the Presidency and Congress and Counselor to the Director at the School for Ethics and Global Leadership.

Krogh co-authored the book Integrity: Good People, Bad Choices, and Life Lessons from the White House with his son Matthew. The book is the basis for the HBO series White House Plumbers.

== Early life ==
Krogh was born in Chicago, Illinois, the son of Josephine (Woolling) and Egil Einar Krogh, a Norwegian immigrant and a businessman. His mother was a homemaker while his father was an executive with the Marshall Field's chain of department stores. His father's frequent relocation had the family living in Chicago, Portland, Oregon, St. Louis, and eventually Seattle.

== Education ==
Krogh graduated with the highest honors from Principia College in Elsah, Illinois in 1961. After service in the U.S. Navy as a communications officer aboard USS Yorktown (1962–1965), he received his Juris Doctor degree from the University of Washington School of Law in 1968.

== Career ==
Krogh was employed by Hullin, Ehrlichman, Roberts, and Hodge, the Seattle law firm of family friend John Ehrlichman, and joined Ehrlichman in the counsel's office of Richard Nixon's 1968 presidential campaign. After Nixon was elected, Krogh helped with the arrangements for the inauguration. He joined the Nixon White House as an advisor on the District of Columbia and later served as liaison to the Federal Bureau of Investigation and the Bureau of Narcotics and Dangerous Drugs. It was there that he met G. Gordon Liddy.

=== Special Investigation Unit ===
Ehrlichman made Krogh head of the "Special Investigation Unit" in the White House, charged with investigating information given covertly to the press by administration staffers. Krogh and his associates were known familiarly as the "Plumbers" — a secret team of operatives charged with fixing "leaks." It was an unlikely choice: Krogh had a reputation as someone who obeyed the law so scrupulously that his friends gave him the ironic nickname "Evil Krogh." Journalist Theodore White would write, "to put Egil Krogh in charge of a secret police operation was equivalent to making Frank Merriwell chief executive of a KGB squad." Krogh brought Liddy into his new office.

When the administration decided to pursue the Pentagon Papers leakers, it was Krogh who approved the September 1971 burglary of the office of Lewis Fielding, the psychiatrist seeing Daniel Ellsberg. Liddy and E. Howard Hunt would commit the actual break-in. Ironically, Ehrlichman, who himself went to prison for Watergate-related crimes, would later write in his memoirs that this was an example of "such doubtful personal judgment ... that it has to be said [Krogh] materially contributed to the demise of the Nixon administration."

Krogh's employment with the SIU was terminated when he subsequently refused to authorize a wiretap. That reticence presaged his acceptance of responsibility for the part he played in the lawlessness of the Nixon White House. When the Watergate scandal broke, and Krogh was implicated, he approached the prosecutors without any request for leniency. On November 30, 1973, Krogh pleaded guilty to federal charges of conspiring to violate Fielding's civil rights and agreed to cooperate with prosecutors. He was sentenced to six years in prison, though he served only four-and-a-half months. After his release from prison he wrote,

"In a country like America, where the rule of law is supposed to be paramount, we have to be able to believe in the integrity of our public officials, civil servants...without a commitment to living and acting with integrity, we can only expect more of the same problems, with good people placed in circumstances where bad decisions become all but unavoidable."

Krogh was disbarred by the Washington State Supreme Court in 1975.

In 1977, he petitioned to be readmitted to the practice of law, based on his recognition and acceptance of his wrongdoing. This petition was rejected. Finally, in 1980, his petition was granted, and he was reinstated to the practice of law.

=== Elvis Presley ===
During his time in the White House, Krogh was in charge of the impromptu visit of Elvis Presley on December 21, 1970. Presley had arrived at the gate with a letter for President Nixon requesting a personal meeting to discuss how he could help the government fight the drug trade. Because of Krogh's work regarding illegal drugs, he managed the visit. The meeting took place, and Nixon gave Presley an actual narcotics agent badge. Krogh wrote a book about these events: The Day Elvis Met Nixon. Presley's visit was also the subject of the 2016 film Elvis & Nixon, in which Krogh was portrayed by Colin Hanks.

=== Private sector ===
In 1980, after being readmitted to the practice of law, Krogh became a partner at Krogh & Leonard in Seattle and provided legal, consulting, and mediation services to energy and other clients.

In 2007, Krogh and his son Matthew wrote the book Integrity: Good People, Bad Choices, and Life Lessons from the White House. The HBO limited series White House Plumbers, starring Woody Harrelson and Justin Theroux, is partly based on Integrity. He was a frequent lecturer on the topic of legal ethics, having visited many schools, bar associations and other gatherings of lawyers and judges. As of 2014, he was a speaker at events where he talked about his experiences.

=== Personal ===
Krogh's marriages to Suzanne Lowell, Laura Lee Carkener, and Ann Horton all ended in divorce. Survivors include his partner, Nancy Glenn Hansen of Washington; two sons from his first marriage, Peter, of Nevada City, California, and Matthew, of Bellingham, Washington; a stepdaughter from his second, Laura Dail, of Manhattan, New York; a son from his third, James, of Shelton, Washington; two sisters; and five grandchildren.

== Death ==
Krogh died from heart failure in Washington, D.C., on January 18, 2020, at age 80.

== See also ==
- Elvis & Nixon

== Bibliography ==
- Krogh, Egil (1994). The Day Elvis Met Nixon. Bellevue, Washington: Pejama Press. ISBN 978-0964025103.
- Krogh, Egil; Krogh, Matthew (2007). Integrity: Good People, Bad Choices, and Life Lessons from the White House. New York: PublicAffairs. ISBN 9781586484675.
- Krogh, Egil (2022). The White House Plumbers: The Seven Weeks That Led to Watergate and Doomed Nixon's Presidency. New York: St. Martin's Griffin. ISBN 978-1250851628.
