= Peter Neill =

American author

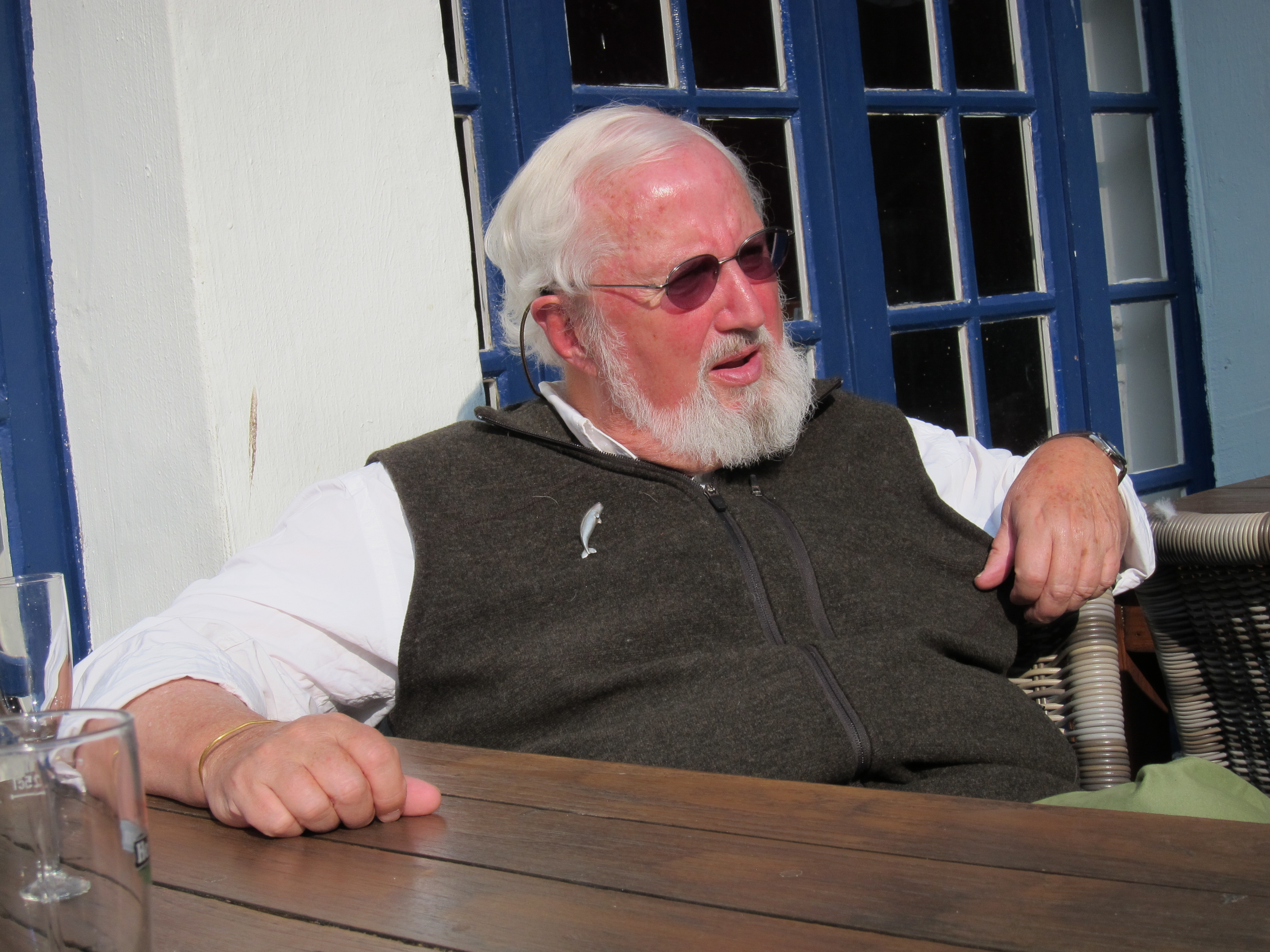
Peter Neill, Director of the World Ocean Observatory and author of numerous books and essays on environmental and ocean issues.

Peter Neill is an author and an editor on environmental and ocean issues, and the founding Director of the World Ocean Observatory, a web-based place for education and information exchange on the health of the ocean. Previously President of the South Street Seaport Museum from 1985 to 2005, he was tenured as a research associate at the Climate Change Institute, University of Maine in 2015. Neill lives in Sedgwick, Maine, with his wife Mary Barnes, who is an artist and President of the Blue Hill Heritage Trust.

== Biography ==
Peter Neill graduated from St. Paul's School in 1959 and Stanford University in 1963 with bachelor's degree. After enrolling the US Army between 1964 and 1966, in 1969 he finished the University of Iowa Writers Workshop with MFA. As an educator, he was an adjunct professor of English at Yale University, Fairfield University, and between 1970 and 1980 Tsuda College in Tokyo. At Yale 1979–1980, Neill was the Editor of the Yale Alumni Magazine and Journal. He was the founder of Leete's Island Books in 1972.

Neill has always maintained an interest in nature while working with the Nature Conservancy, Connecticut Chapter (Trustee, 1978–1982), High Mountain Institute, Leadville, Colorado (Founding Chair and emeritus, 1995–2007), and on the East coast in Maine, the Atlantic Challenge Foundation, Rockland (chair, 1988–2006), the Penobscot Marine Museum, Searsport (Trustee and Vice Chair for Programs, 2006–2014), and the Ocean Classroom Foundation, Boothbay Harbor (Trustee and chair, 2007–2014).

His career has been dedicated to marine affairs and the future of the oceans, as the past President of the Council of American Maritime Museums and of the International Congress of Maritime Museums, and also holding educational programs for schools on ocean related subjects with a strong proponent of maritime education. During his time at the South Street Seaport Museum, he devoted a third of the museum's budget to the New York City schools, and was the chairman of the board of directors for the Ocean Classroom Foundation. Neill is a co-founder of two innovative public high schools, the Sound School in New Haven, Connecticut, and The Harbor School, New York, NY. They developed context for teaching and learning to apply maritime history and environment.

In 2015 he published American Sea Writing: a literary anthology as his second anthology. He also contributes regularly for a blog on the Huffington Post. His contributions were published in Smithsonian, The New York Times, WoodenBoat, and other publications.

== Books ==
=== Authored ===
- A Time Piece. New York: Grossman Publishers. 1970. ISBN 9780670714957. OCLC 65441.
- Mock Turtle Soup. New York: Grossman Publishers. 1972. ISBN 9780670482436. OCLC 315071.
- Acoma: a novel. New Haven, Connecticut: Leete's Island Books. 1978. OCLC 729784296.
- Maritime America: Art and Artifacts from America's Great Nautical Collections. Balsam Press in affiliation with H. Abrams. 1988. ISBN 9780810915275. OCLC 17480048.
- 3. Leete's Island Books. 2013. ISBN 9780918172501. OCLC 908939040. Reprint of "A Time Piece" (1970), "Mock Turtle Soup" (1972), and "Acoma" (1978.)
- Once and Future Ocean, Notes Toward a New Hydraulic Society. Sedgwick, Maine: Leete's Island Books. 2015. ISBN 9780918172570. OCLC 951681688.

=== Co-authored and edited ===
- Trachtenberg, Alan; Bunnell, Peter C (1971). The city: American experience. New York: Oxford University Press. ISBN 9780195014006. OCLC 138576.
- Krohn, Barbara Ehrenwald (1991). Great maritime museums of the world. New York: Balsam Press in association with H.N. Abrams. ISBN 9780917439124. OCLC 23253214.
- Randall, James; Demisch, Suzanne; Steen, Gareth L (1995). On a Painted Ocean: Art of the Seven Seas. New York University Press. ISBN 9780814757871. OCLC 194133740.
- Fletcher, Ellen; Brouwer, Norman J (1999). Walking Around South Street: Discoveries in New York's Old Shipping District. South Street Seaport Museum. South Street Seaport Museum in association with Leete's Island Books. ISBN 9780918172273.
- Neill, P, ed. (2000). American Sea Writing: a literary anthology. Library of America.
