= Kerry Hannon =

American author

- Born: October 29, 1960 (age 65); Pittsburgh, Pennsylvania, U.S.
- Education: Duke University
- Occupation: Author
- Spouse: Cliff Hackel

Kerry Hannon (born October 29, 1960) is an American author whose writings focus on careers, entrepreneurship and personal finance.

== Biography ==
Hannon was born in Pittsburgh, Pennsylvania. She is a graduate of Duke University.

She is a senior columnist and on-air expert at Yahoo Finance and a workplace futurist. Kerry is a former columnist and contributor for The New York Times, MarketWatch, and Forbes. She is a former personal finance, entrepreneurship and work columnist for the PBS website, Next Avenue (nextavenue.org). Hannon is a former AARP Work and Job's expert columnist.

She speaks on the topics of personal finance, retirement, job search, career transitions, and women and financial security.

Hannon is a member of the board of visitors at Shady Side Academy in Pittsburgh, Pennsylvania.

On July 4, 1992, she married Cliff Hackel, a Peabody, Dupont and Emmy Award-winning documentary producer, director, and editor.

== Publications ==
- Trees in a Circle: The Teec Nos Pos Story (2000), a non-fiction saga of an American Indian trading post
- Ten Minute Guide to Retirement for Women (MacMillan Publishing, 1996)
- Suddenly Single: Money Skills for Divorcees and Widows (John Wiley & Sons, 1998)
- Getting Started In Estate Planning (John Wiley & Sons, 2000)
- What's Next?: Finding Your Passion and Your Dream Job (Chronicle Books, 2010)
- Great Jobs for Everyone 50+: Finding Work That Keeps You Happy and Healthy ... And Pays the Bills (John Wiley & Sons, 2012)
- What's Next?: Finding Your Passion and Your Dream Job in Your Forties, Fifties and Beyond (John Wiley & Sons, 2015)
- Love Your Job The New Rules for Career Happiness (John Wiley & Sons, 2015)
- Finding The Job You Want After 50 for Dummies (For Dummies, 2015)
- Great Jobs for Everyone 50 +: Finding Work That Keeps You Happy And Healthy...and Pays The Bills (Wiley, 2017)
- Money Confidence: Really Smart Financial Moves for Newly Single Women (Post Hill Press, 2017)
- Never Too Old to Get Rich: The Entrepreneur's Guide to Starting a Business Mid-Life (Wiley, 2019)
- Great Pajama Jobs: Your Complete Guide to Working From Home (Wiley, 2020)
- In Control at 50+: How to Succeed in The New World of Work (McGraw Hill, 2022)
