= School for Ethics and Global Leadership =

Boarding school in Washington, DC, US

The School for Ethics and Global Leadership
- SEGL
- Washington, DC; United States

Information
- Type: Semester-long, boarding school
- Motto: "Change Yourself. Change the World."
- Established: 2006
- Founder: Noah Bopp
- Enrollment: 24
- Campus: Washington, DC/ Johannesburg, South Africa/ London, UK
- Website: www.schoolforethics.org

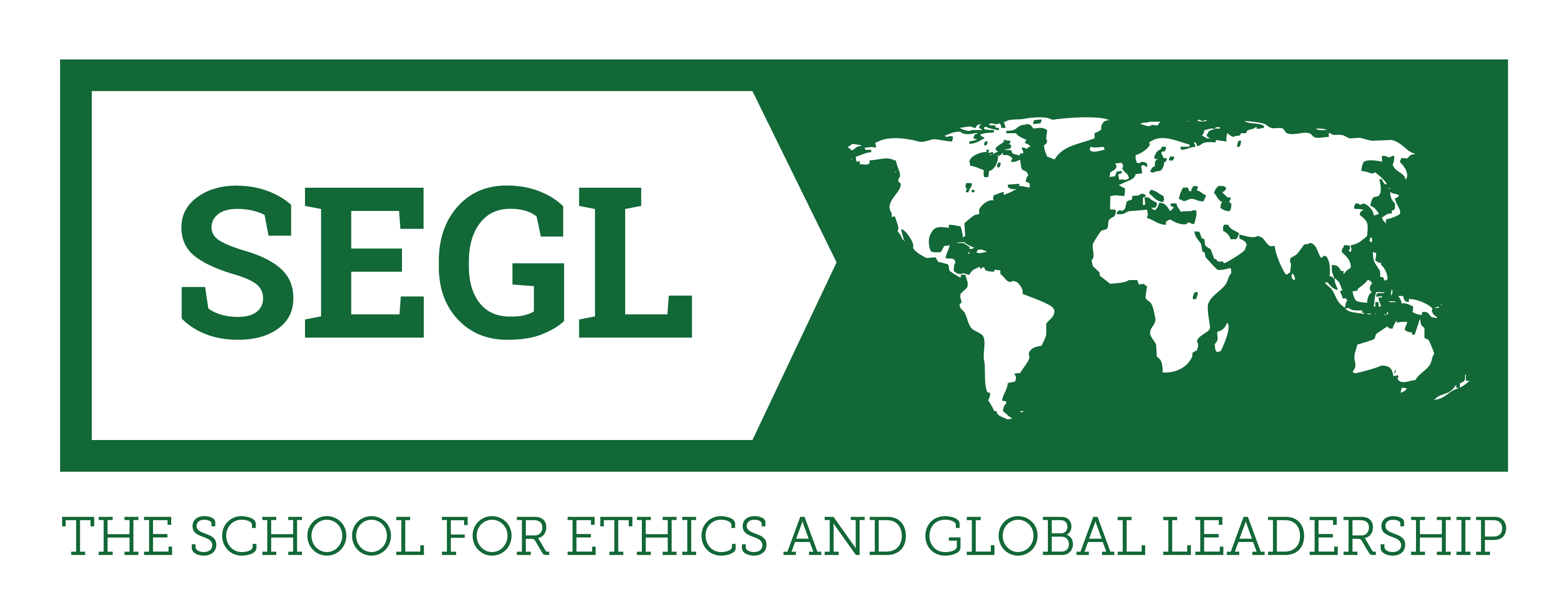

The School for Ethics and Global Leadership (SEGL) is a semester-long residential program for high school juniors from across the United States. Headquartered in Washington, D.C., the program emphasizes ethical thinking, leadership development, and international affairs. In addition to Washington, DC, SEGL has campuses in Johannesburg, South Africa and London, United Kingdom.

== History ==
Educator Noah Bopp founded SEGL in response to the September 11, 2001, attacks. SEGL matriculated its first class of students on August 29, 2009. It opened a second campus in partnership with the African Leadership Academy in 2020. The school opened a third year-round campus, in London, United Kingdom, in the fall of 2023. Since its inception, the school has graduated over 1000 students, most of whom come from across the United States.

== Academics ==
All SEGL students take the School's flagship Ethics and Leadership course for two hours on Monday morning, all day Wednesday, and for two hours on Friday afternoon. Students also take honors/AP-level courses that match sending school requirements and have regular 50-minute and 100-minute block periods. The school also hosts Summer Ethics and Leadership Institutes in DC and in London and offers several summer international excursions.

Visits with prominent guest speakers are a core aspect of the Ethics and Leadership course, occurring almost every week of the semester. Guests have included Supreme Court Justices Clarence Thomas and Ketanji Brown Jackson, Senators Cory Booker and Chuck Schumer, Generals Stanley A. McChrystal and John F. Kelly, Watergate-era "Plumber" Egil "Bud" Krogh, Rwandan Genocide hero Carl Wilkens, White House speechwriter Lissa Muscatine, lobbyist Jack Abramoff, Ambassador Mark Dybul, former White House Press Secretary Mike McCurry, NRA President David Keene, Governor Michael Dukakis, and former United States President Barack Obama.
