= City Point, New Haven =

Neighborhood in New Haven, Connecticut

- Oyster Point Historic District
- U.S. National Register of Historic Places
- U.S. Historic district
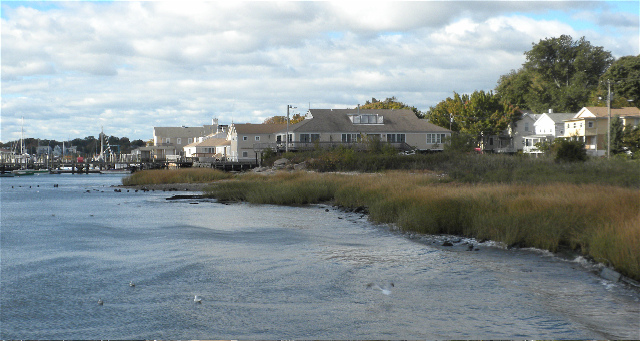

- Location within Connecticut Location within the United States
- Location: Roughly bounded by I-95, South Water Street, Howard Avenue, Sea Street, and Greenwich Avenue, New Haven, Connecticut
- Coordinates: 41°16′59″N 72°55′47″W
- Area: 26 acres (11 ha)
- Built: 1939
- Architectural style: Late 19th and 20th Century Revivals, Greek Revival, Late Victorian
- NRHP reference No.: 89001085
- Added to NRHP: August 10, 1989

City Point (formerly known as Oyster Point) is an area in what is now The Hill Neighborhood of the City of New Haven, Connecticut, located in the Southwestern portion of the City. The City Point area was, when settled and through the 18th century, a relatively narrow peninsula extending south into New Haven Harbor, located where the West River empties into the harbor. Areas adjacent to the original peninsula have since been filled in, broadening its shoulders, and I-95 has cut across it. The Oyster Point Historic District is a 26-acre (11 ha) historic district encompassing an area of relatively old buildings in City Point South of I-95.

== Neighborhood definitions ==
City Point is bordered on the west by the West River, on the north by Amtrak railroad tracks, on the east by Hallock Avenue, and on the South by New Haven Harbor. An earlier tradition defines the northern border as "the Southern back yards of Lamberton Street between Hallock and Greenwich Avenues." When the neighborhood was bisected by the Connecticut Turnpike in the 1950s some began to describe City Point as consisting only of the portion south of the highway (Sixth Street to South Water Street) although this is a change from historic usage. Most of the portion south of I-95 is listed as Oyster Point Historic District on the National Register of Historic Places, referencing the old name of the Neighborhood, Oyster Point. The area along Howard Avenue north of I-95 is included in a separate historic district, the Howard Avenue Historic District. Waterfront condominiums, I-95 and its ramps, and other portions of the Neighborhood are not included in any historic district.

== History ==
The neighborhood was originally a "point" or peninsula surrounded by New Haven Harbor on the east and south, bordering what is now Hallock Avenue & South Water Street, and the West River wetlands on the west, bordering what is now Greenwich Avenue. In the 19th and early 20th Century, until public health authorities condemned the oyster beds, City Point's economy included oyster harvesting and fishing from the waters of New Haven Harbor and Long Island Sound. In 1929 the Boulevard was extended to Sea Street, and the West River salt marsh began to be filled in (ultimately becoming Kimberly Field, consisting of two baseball diamonds). In the early 20th century, Second Street was extended to Kimberly Avenue and the First Street. Peter Catholic Church was built. The parish included the traditional City Point neighborhood between Greenwich Avenue and Hallock Avenue, as well as the Kimberly Avenue area. Thus by the mid 20th century, some residents of Kimberly, Grant, Cassius & Plymouth Streets also considered themselves to be City Point residents—even though this area never was part of the geographical "point" from which City Point had derived its name. With the construction of the Connecticut Turnpike/Interstate 95 in the mid-1950s, most of the water on City Point's eastern border also was filled in. The eastern waters were replaced with the New York, New Haven and Hartford Railroad's yard, One Long Wharf's parking lot, the New Haven Food Terminal, & both Sargent Drive and Long Wharf Drive. Thus today only the southern tip of City Point is bordered by water. Yet when viewing a map of the area, the street grid still clearly shows the original outline of the neighborhood and "point" bounded by Greenwich Avenue and Hallock Avenue. In 1978 the (Ella T. Grasso) Boulevard finally was completed, with the construction of a bridge over the railroad tracks, thereby connecting lower Kimberly Avenue to the rest of the Hill. At the end of the 20th century, the second St. Peter Church was demolished along with St. Peter & Kimberly Avenue, Schools, and Second Street was returned to its original 1868 configuration. Consequently, today most residents of Kimberly, Grant, Plymouth & Cassius streets consider themselves to be in the Kimberly Square neighborhood or simply part of The Hill, rather than part of City Point.

== Oyster Point Historic District ==
The Oyster Point Historic District area within the City Point neighborhood was listed as a historic district on the U.S. National Register of Historic Places in 1989. The Oyster Point Historic District includes 130 buildings deemed to contribute to the historic character of its 26-acre (11 ha) area, and three other contributing structures. The district boundaries were drawn to include historic buildings and open area, but to exclude modern condominium buildings on the waterfront.

The district's area was a productive oystering community during 1840 to 1925. Extensive tidal flats used to extend out from the area, but have been reduced by landfill and dredging.

The district today is a cohesive neighborhood which includes a number of oystermen's houses, which is a distinct architectural style of the mid-19th century, and several Queen Anne style houses. As of the NRHP listing, the district included 108 single- or multi-family houses built during 1840 to 1925.

The district includes the southern portion of a park. Bay View Park was developed in the 1890s and includes a Civil War monument. It was reduced to its current 12-acre (4.9 ha) size by I-95's construction through its center. The former Boulevard Sewage Treatment plant was significant for being New Haven's first sewage treatment facility, and also was significant for its Art Deco architecture, but blocked what was formerly a shoreline drive. It was demolished to expand the Sound School's campus.

== Points of interest ==
- New Haven Harbor
- The Sound School

== Gallery ==
Contributing properties

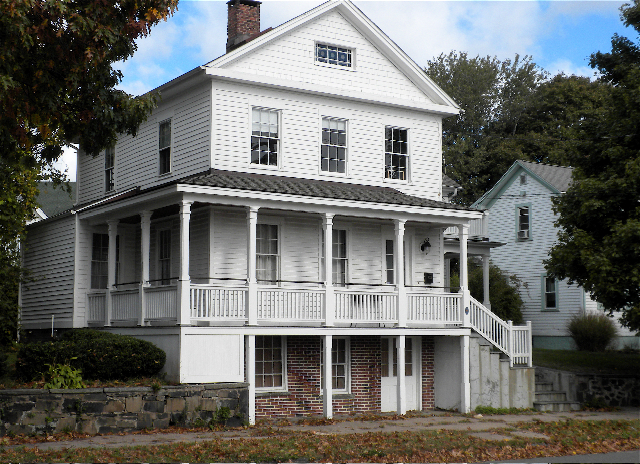
South Water Street, City Point, contributing to Historic District.

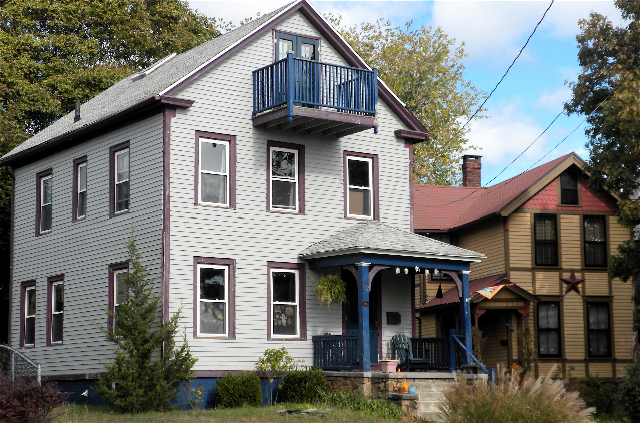
South Water Street, City Point, contributing to Historic District.

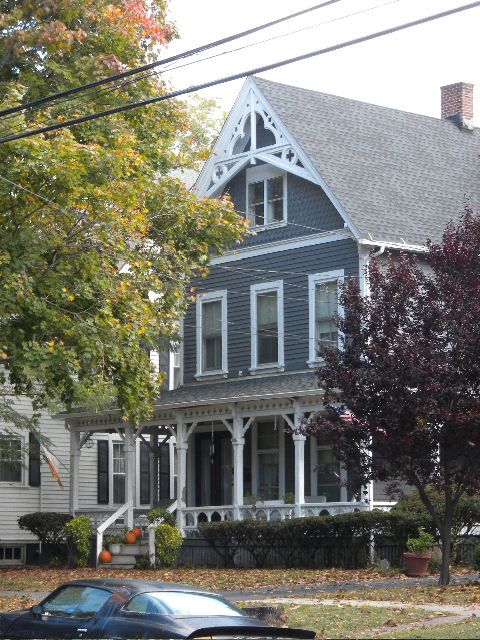
45 Howard Avenue (1870s), contributing to Historic District.

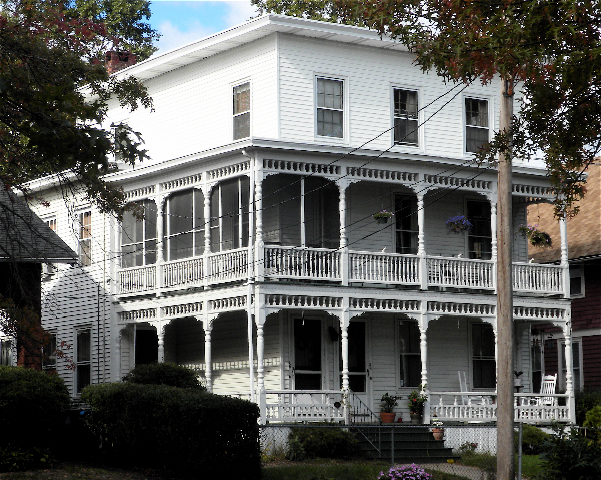
36-38 Howard Avenue, contributing to Historic District.

== See also ==
- Howard Avenue Historic District, another historic district that includes the northern part of the neighborhood
- National Register of Historic Places listings in New Haven, Connecticut
