= Oystermen's houses =

Oystermen's house style is an architectural style of the mid-19th century in coastal, oceanfront areas where oyster collectors lived and worked. A number of such houses are preserved in Oyster Point Historic District, a National Register of Historic Places-listed historic district on New Haven Harbor in Connecticut, a site of oyster collecting from about 1840 until 1925 when oystering was banned by the health department. Oystermen's house style includes high, windowless basements suitable for holding oysters, and also include Greek Revival style elements.
