= Scott Booker =

American football coach (born 1980)

New England Patriots
- Title: Safeties coach

Personal information
- Born: October 7, 1980 (age 46); Pittsburgh, Pennsylvania, U.S.

Career information
- Position: Safety
- High school: Shady Side Academy (Pittsburgh, Pennsylvania)
- College: Kent State (1999–2002)

Career history
- Kent State (2003–2004) Graduates assistant; Kent State (2005–2008) Defensive backs; Western Kentucky (2009) Secondary coach; Notre Dame (2010–2016) Tight ends coach and special teams coordinator; Nebraska (2017) Safeties coach and special teams coordinator; Tennessee Titans (2018–2023); Defensive assistant (2018–2019); Safeties coach (2020–2023); Buffalo Bills (2024) Senior Defensive Assistant; New England Patriots (2025–present) Safeties coach

Scott Booker (born October 7, 1980) is an American football coach who is currently the safeties coach for the New England Patriots of the National Football League (NFL). He has previously coached for the Tennessee Titans and Buffalo Bills and spent more than 15 years coaching at the collegiate level prior to entering the NFL.

== Personal life ==
Scott Booker was born October 7, 1980, in Pittsburgh, Pennsylvania. Booker graduated in Shady Side Academy. Booker is married to his wife Jen Booker, and they have one daughter together. Booker played football at Kent State from 1999 to 2002, earning MAC All-Academic honors during his time there.

== Coaching career ==
Booker began his coaching career at his alma mater, Kent State, serving as a graduate assistant and later as defensive backs coach. In 2006, Kent State ranked among the top teams in the Mid-American Conference in multiple pass defense categories. Booker also coached Western Kentucky as a secondary coach, Notre Dame as a tight end coach and special teams coordinator and Nebraska as a safeties coach.

=== Tennessee Titans (2018–2023) ===
Booker entered the NFL in 2018, joining the Tennessee Titans under head coach Mike Vrabel. During his tenure, Booker coached Pro Bowl safety Kevin Byard, who earned First-Team All-Pro honors in 2021.

=== Buffalo Bills (2024) ===
The Buffalo Bills hired Booker as a defensive assistant in 2024, under head coach Sean McDermott.

=== New England Patriots (2025–present) ===
The Patriots hired Booker as their safeties coach in 2025. Reuniting with head coach Mike Vrabel.
