= Sound School =

Vocational school in Connecticut, United States

Coordinates: 41°16′55″N 72°55′43″W

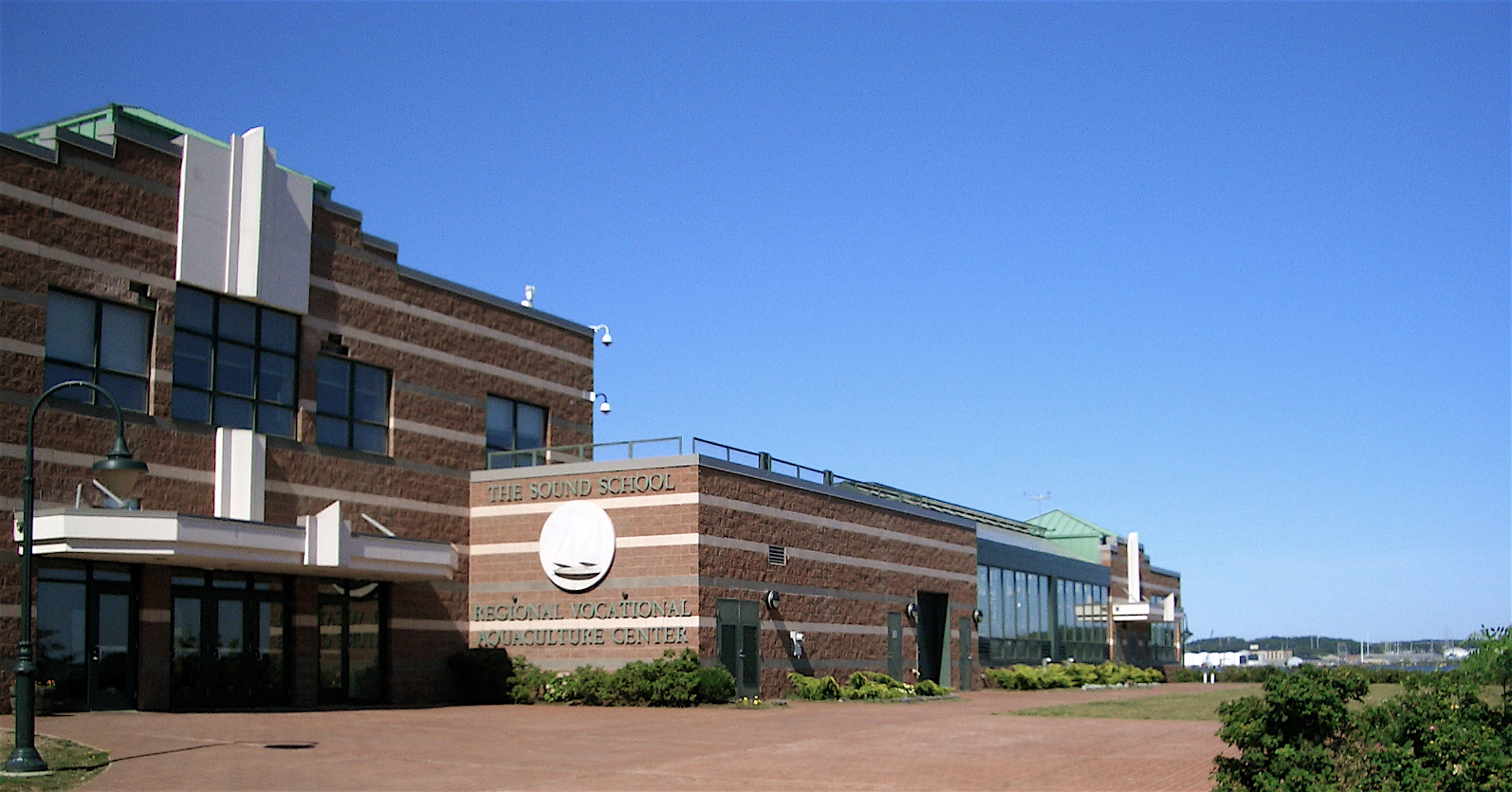
The Sound School's main building

The Sound School is a regional vocational aquaculture center situated in the City Point neighborhood of New Haven, Connecticut.
