= High Mountain Institute =

Coordinates: 39°14′18″N 106°22′08″W

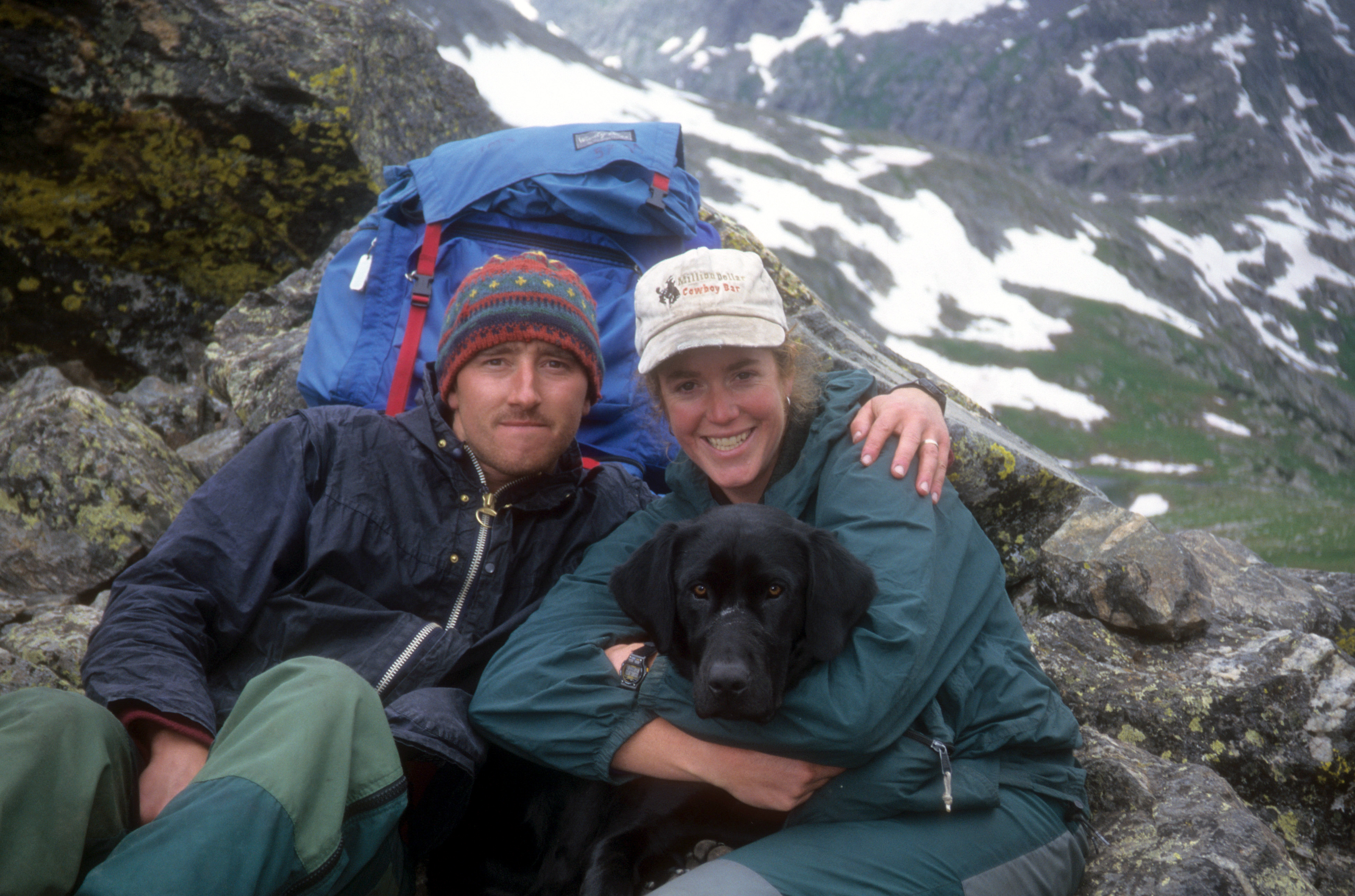
- HMI Founders, Molly & Christopher Barnes

Location
- 531 County Rd; Leadville, Colorado 80461; United States

Information
- Type: Private, semester-long, college preparatory, boarding school, gap year provider
- Motto: "When Nature and Minds Meet"
- Established: 1995 (31 years ago)
- Founder: Molly and Christopher Barnes
- CEEB code: 060919
- Gender: Coeducational
- Campus size: 80 acres
- Campus type: Rural
- Mascot: Fighting Pika
- Accreditation: Association of Colorado Independent Schools, Association for Experiential Education, American Gap Association
- Affiliation: Semester School Network
- Website: www.hminet.org

The High Mountain Institute (HMI) is a non-profit school located in Leadville, Colorado. Founded in 1995 by Molly and Christopher Barnes, HMI focuses on educating teenagers through interaction with the natural world in the American West and Patagonia, South America. The school offers semester and summer programs for high school students, gap year programming for high school graduates, and short programs for middle school students and adults.

== History ==
The High Mountain Institute was founded in Leadville, Colorado in 1995 by Christopher and Molly Barnes. The couple met as wilderness instructors at Deer Hill Expeditions and spent the early 1990s working in independent schools, including the Orme School and outdoor education organizations, including the National Outdoor Leadership School. Over that period, Barnes and Peterson conceived of what would become HMI—a college preparatory semester school that incorporates community and wilderness pedagogy central to the outdoor education industry. Encouraged to act sooner rather than later by Peter Neill, who went on to become the founding Chair of the Board of HMI, the Barneses incorporated HMI as a 501(c)(3) non-profit organization, purchased land in Lake County, CO, and broke ground on their new school in 1997.

The High Mountain Institute officially opened its doors in fall 1998 with a cohort of 21 students forming the inaugural HMI Semester—then called the Rocky Mountain Semester. HMI Semester enrollment grew steadily in the following years, reaching 48 students in 2014 where it has held since. The HMI campus has also grown, doubling in size from 40 to 80 acres in 2011, and increasing in number of academic, facilities, and residential buildings. The school has also added new programming including gap semesters for high school graduates, summer programs for middle and high school students, and avalanche safety and wilderness medicine courses for adults. After co-leading the school together for fifteen years, Molly and Christopher Barnes departed HMI in 2013 and proceeded to sail around the world for three years with their two sons.

== HMI Semester ==
The HMI Semester is the founding program of the High Mountain Institute and has operated continuously since fall 1998. The program is a single-semester boarding school experience for high school juniors and seniors that combines college preparatory academics with extended backpacking and backcountry skiing expeditions. The student body, composed of 48 students, turns over every semester as graduating students return home to their four-year high schools and a new cohort arrives. Students enroll from various educational backgrounds including public schools, private schools, and boarding schools. As with all semester schools, the purpose of the HMI Semester is to offer a high school study away experience akin to a college study abroad semester where students learn by "stepping outside of their comfort zones". Students enroll in classes that largely align with the typical junior year curriculum. Admission to the HMI Semester is selective as the program receives approximately twice as many applications as spots. The HMI Semester is accredited by the National Association of Independent Schools and is a member of the Semester Schools Network, an affiliation of eleven established high school semester schools.

=== Wilderness ===
HMI Semester students partake in two or three wilderness expeditions in the Rocky Mountains of Colorado and the canyons of Utah, specifically Bears Ears National Monument. Expeditions last from ten to eighteen days; students spend a total of five weeks in the wilderness over the course of the seventeen-week semester. Students backpack while on expedition, carrying their gear and food on their backs and covering three to seven miles on foot on any given day. Spring semester students participate in a twelve-day winter expedition on telemark skis. During this trip, students pull sleds behind them as they ski and construct quigloos for shelter. While on wilderness expedition, students complete academic assignments, learn backcountry survival skills, and study leadership theory and ethics.

=== Residential life ===
HMI students live in off-the-grid cabins with solar-powered lights and wood-burning stoves. In keeping with the school's philosophy of collective responsibility, students are expected to complete daily chores that include cooking, cleaning, and chopping wood. Students participate in daily morning exercise and train to run ten miles at the end of the semester. Students visit the nearby town of Leadville regularly and participate in volunteer trail maintenance on a local fourteener.

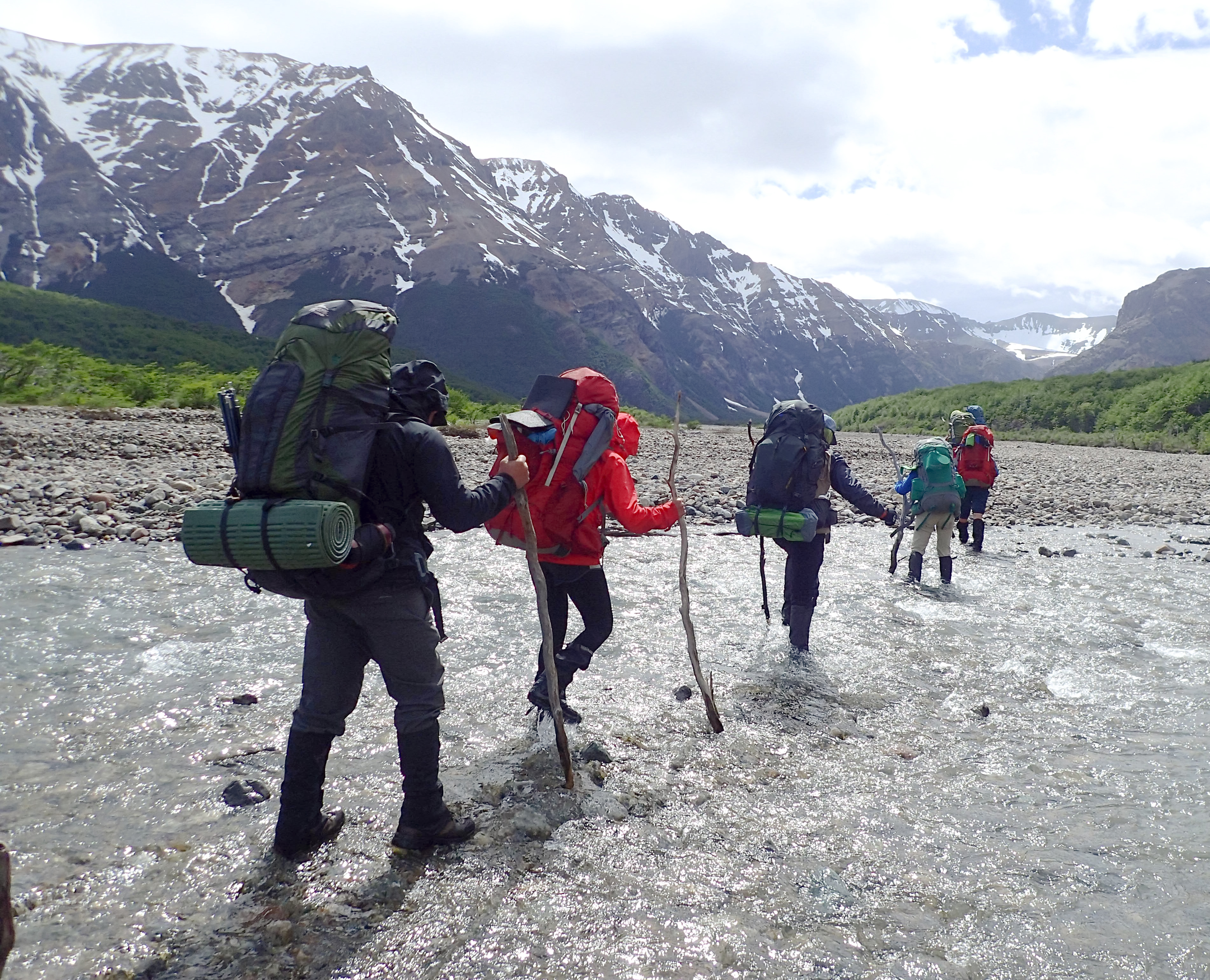
HMI Gap students backpacking in Parque Patagonia

== HMI Summer Term ==
Created in 2011, the HMI Summer Term is a 4-week summer program for high school students. The program combines extended wilderness expeditions with field studies based on HMI's campus. About 20 students participate each summer.

== HMI Gap Semesters ==
The High Mountain Institute offers gap semesters for high school graduates, ages 17–22. These programs take students on a three-month experiential and expeditionary semester through Patagonia and the American West. Students can earn college credit through Western Colorado University and Colorado Mountain College.
