= Kings Land o' Lakes Airport =

Airport in Wisconsin, United States

- IATA: none; ICAO: KLNL; FAA LID: LNL

Summary
- Airport type: Public
- Owner: Town of Land o' Lakes
- Serves: Land o' Lakes, Wisconsin
- Opened: December 1941
- Time zone: CST (UTC−06:00)
  - Summer (DST): CDT (UTC−05:00)
- Elevation AMSL: 1,706 ft (520 m)
- Coordinates: 46°09′15″N 089°12′43″W

Map
- Location of airport in Wisconsin LNL (the United States)

Runways
Direction	Length		Surface
Direction	ft	m	Surface
14/32	4,000	1,219	Asphalt
5/23	2,577	785	Turf

Statistics
- Aircraft operations (2022): 8,100
- Based aircraft (2024): 14
- Source: Federal Aviation Administration

Kings Land o' Lakes Airport (ICAO: KLNL, FAA LID: LNL) is a public use airport located one nautical mile (1.85 km) southeast of the central business district of the unincorporated community of Land o' Lakes in the town of Land o' Lakes, Vilas County, Wisconsin, United States. It is owned by the town of Land o' Lakes. It is included in the Federal Aviation Administration (FAA) National Plan of Integrated Airport Systems for 2025–2029, in which it is categorized as a basic general aviation facility.

Although most U.S. airports use the same three-letter location identifier for the FAA and IATA, this airport is assigned LNL by the FAA but has no designation from the IATA.

== Facilities and aircraft ==
Kings Land o' Lakes Airport covers an area of 496 acres (201 ha) at an elevation of 1,706 feet (520 m) above mean sea level. It has two runways: 14/32 is an asphalt runway 4,000 by 75 feet (1,219 x 23 m) with approved GPS approaches and 5/23 is 2,577 by 130 feet (785 x 40 m) with a turf surface. The Land o' Lakes NDB navaid (LNL), frequency 396 kHz, is located on the field.

For the 12-month period ending September 8, 2022, the airport had 8,100 aircraft operations, an average of 22 per day: 99% general aviation and 1% air taxi.

In August 2024, there were 14 aircraft based at this airport: all 14 single-engine.

== See also ==
- List of airports in Wisconsin
