= Alzar School =

Semester school in Cascade, Idaho, US

Coordinates: 44°28′53″N 116°00′56″W

- Cascade, Idaho and Patagonia, Chile

Information
- Type: Semester school

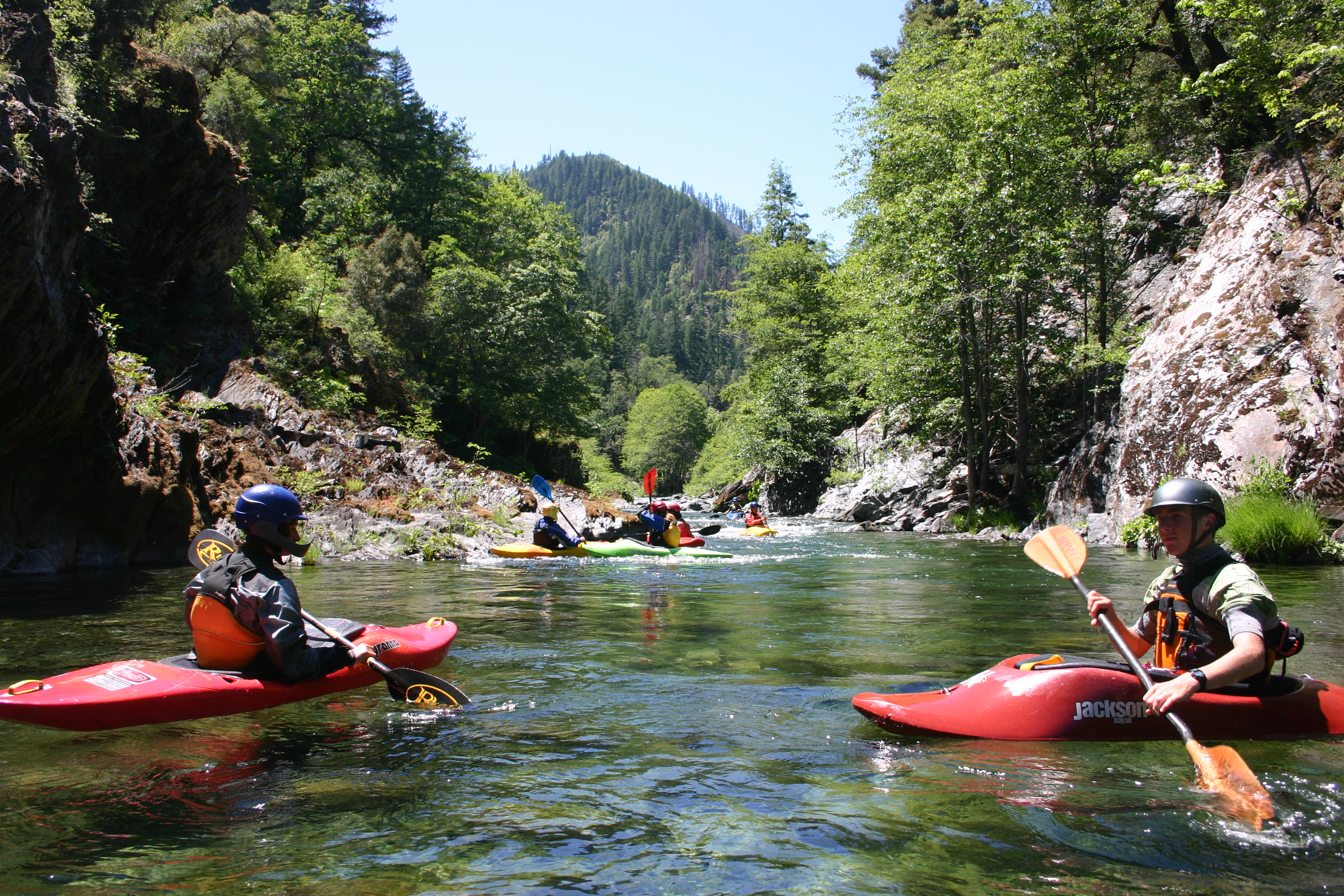
Alzar School students on Clear Creek, in northern California

Alzar School is a semester school based in Cascade, Idaho, and Patagonia, Chile, that serves high school sophomores and juniors. For either a fall or spring semester 35-45 students from all across the world join Alzar School for a fully accredited semester of high school. It is built upon the "Six Foundations" of Academics, Leadership Training, Outdoor Adventure, Cultural Exchange, Service Learning, and Environmental Stewardship. The school is accredited by the Northwest Accreditation Commission which is an accreditation division of AdvancED.

== Semester school ==
During a semester at Alzar School, students live at the 450-acre campus in Cascade, Idaho, and spend more than six weeks living abroad in Patagonia, Chile. Students participate in significant outdoor expeditions. Additionally, students continue their traditional academic courses (science, math, history, English, Spanish, etc.).

== Idaho campus ==
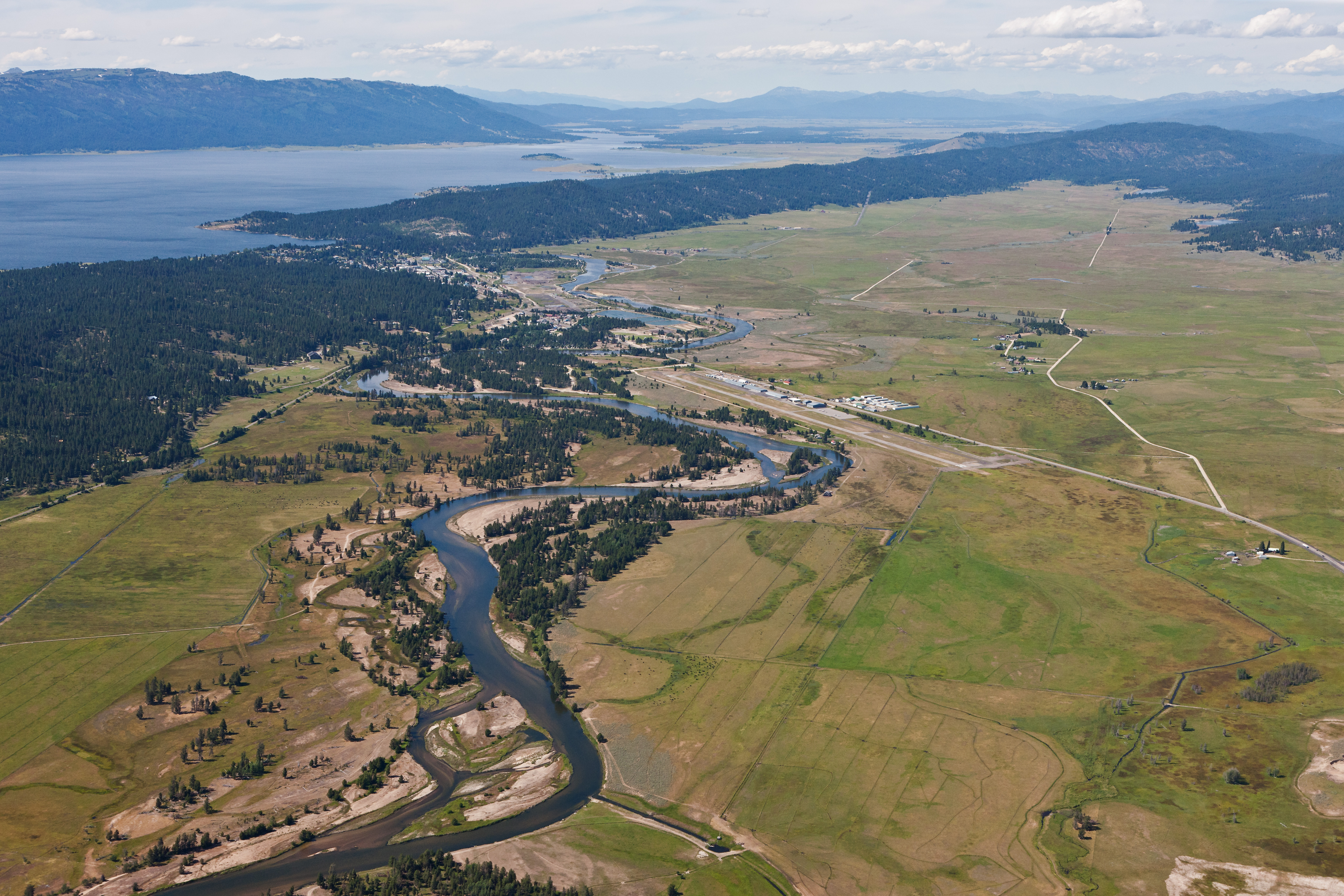
Alzar School's 450-acre campus in Cascade, Idaho

The Alzar School campus is located on the North Fork of the Payette River, in Valley County, Idaho. The campus has over 1 mile of river frontage and is just downstream of Kelly's Whitewater Park. The campus is near the main road but still feels secluded and wild. There is a town nearby and medical assistance is readily available.

== Chile ==
Every semester, Alzar School spends approximately 6 weeks in Chile. Fall semesters end in Chile and spring semesters begin in Chile. While in Chile, students continue their academic curriculum with faculty traveling with the group. Students will spend approximately three weeks in small Chilean towns.

== History ==
Alzar School is a 501(c)3 nonprofit organization that was founded in 2004 by Kristin Bierle and Sean Bierle. From 2007-2011, the school offered three-week expeditions to Idaho/California, Mexico, and Chile. These expeditions included service projects such as improving the playground at an orphanage in Chile, hauling school supplies into a remote rural school in Mexico, and working with the US Forest Service to do ecological projects in California and Idaho.

== Name ==
Alzar is a Spanish verb that translates to 'to rise, elevate, lift, boost'. It is used in many different expressions, such as alzar el vuelo ('to take flight'), alzar la carpa ('to pitch a tent'), alzar la vela ('to set sail').

== Camp Cup Challenge ==
The Camp Cup Challenge is a whitewater paddling event involving several summer camps from North Carolina and other states. The Camp Cup Challenge is put on by the Alzar School and hosted by Nantahala Outdoor Center on the Nantahala River.
