= Dr. Theopolis (band) =

Dr. Theopolis is a Portland-based rap/funk band named after the character Dr. Theopolis from Buck Rogers in the 25th Century.

The group consists of eight members and has gained a loyal following in the Pacific Northwest. They have released two albums, The Voice of the Future (2002) and Astronomical (2004), and there are plans for a third. The band's eight members include an Afro-wearing dancer known as "Mr. Fabulous". As a full-fledged member of the band, Mr. Fabulous sings on occasion, but his greatest asset to the group is to rile the crowd with his dancing. As with other members of the band, Mr. Fabulous often takes the stage wearing a range of eclectic costumes, from vintage 70s tuxedos to marching band coats, and even children's halloween costumes.

The songs blend old school hip-hop with Ohio Players or Average White Band-styled funk, with a little bit of the showmanship and sound of Parliament Funk. Their most famous songs include "Sweet Love", a soulful, protracted variation of a classic "your mother" joke. Other songs parody hip-hop swagger, including "Pound for Pound" "Voice of the Future" (the title track for their 2002 album). Their latest album, Astronomical, included a song entitled "Hit 'em Where Their Ears Are At", a commentary on the trend towards vanity and shallowness (instead of musical talent) in pop music.
