= Semester school =

A semester school is a school that complements a student's secondary education by providing them with the opportunity to step out of their regular school for half an academic year and step into a uniquely different educational setting while continuing their required academic studies. The academic curriculum at semester schools tends to be college preparatory, interdisciplinary, and experiential.

== Characteristics ==
- Semester school curricula are built around themes including environmental sustainability, marine ecology, organic farming, ethics and leadership, visual arts, and others. The curricula tend to be place-based drawing on the resources and opportunities of each school's unique location.
- Semester schools are boarding schools. Community living is a key element of the experience. Through living closely with peers and teachers and working together to benefit the school community students develop their communication, leadership, and cooperative skills.
- Semester schools enroll college bound sophomores, juniors, and or seniors. Most semester schools focus primarily on students from just one grade level.
- Semester school programs run from 14 to 18 weeks.
- Semester schools tend to be small, enrolling from 15 to 60 students a semester with average class sizes ranging from 5 to 15 students.
- Semester schools are private schools that charge tuition and offer financial aid. Depending on the school and a student’s family situation the cost can range from no cost to several thousands of dollars.
- Most semester schools are located in the United States.
- While most semester schools serve students in secondary school or high school, Steward Outdoor School in Ivoryton, CT serves middle school students.

== Benefits ==
Attending a semester school can:

- Intensify a student’s interest in and motivation for learning.
- Allow a student to pursue a special area of interest in depth.
- Complement a student's education with experiences that aren't available at their home school.
- Broaden a student’s range of skills and interests and increase their maturity level.
- Give students a head start on developing the independence, good judgment, and life skills necessary for living away from home before they leave for college.
- Provide students with a unique, eye-catching experience that sets them apart from other applicants when applying to colleges.
- Provide students from public schools a boarding school experience without the cost or time commitment of a four-year school.

== Growth ==
The first semester school was Milton Academy's Mountain School which opened in 1984 in Vershire, Vermont. Since then more than a dozen additional semester schools have opened across the United States of America and in other countries. The list of opening dates below shows the growth in semester schools over time and their geographic diversity.

1984 – Mountain School, Vershire, Vermont
1986 – Swiss Semester, Zermatt, Switzerland
1988 – Maine Coast Semester, Maine Coast Semester at Chewonki, Wiscasset, Maine
1995 – The Outdoor Academy, Pisgah Forest, North Carolina
1996 – CITYterm, Dobbs Ferry, New York (closed Fall 2019)
1997 – High School Semester at Sea (Ocean Classroom), Western North Atlantic Ocean and the Caribbean Sea (closed July 2014)
1998 – High Mountain Institute, Leadville, Colorado (originally named Rocky Mountain Semester)
1999 – The Island School, Cape Eleuthera, Bahamas
1999 – Oxbow School, Napa, California (closed)
2000 – The Traveling School, Southern Africa & South America with a home office in Bozeman, Montana
2004 – Woolman Semester, Nevada City, California (closed)
2004 – Kroka Semester School, Marlow, New Hampshire
2009 – School for Ethics and Global Leadership, Washington, D.C.
2009 – Finding the Good, Nevada City, California (closed)
2010 – Coastal Studies for Girls, Freeport, Maine (closed)
2010 – Conserve School, Land O’ Lakes, Wisconsin (closed)
2012 – Alzar School, Valley County, Idaho
2012 – Burr and Burton Academy Mountain Campus, Manchester, Vermont
2016 – Steward Outdoor School Ivoryton, Connecticut
