= The Crane Wives =

American folk band

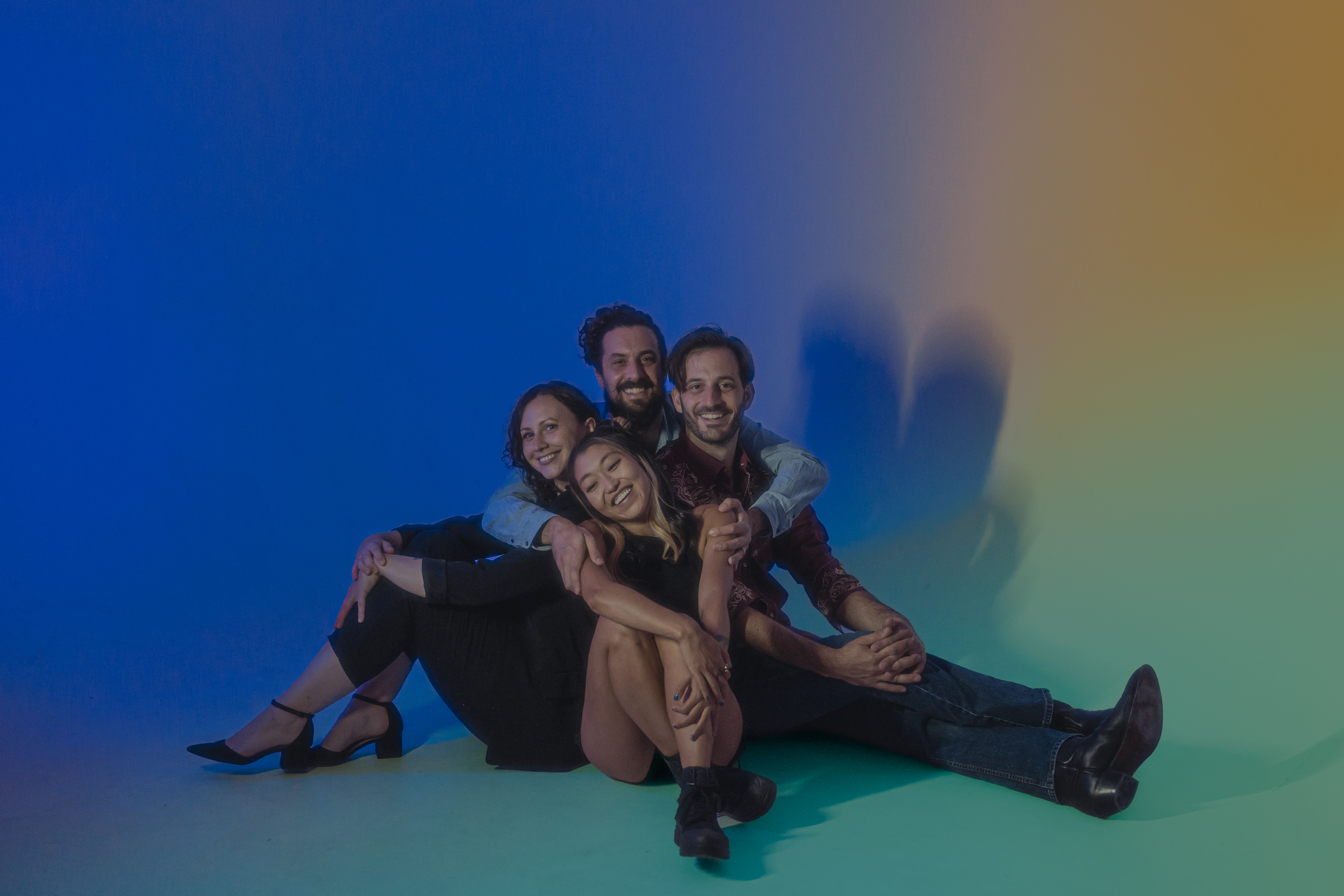
- Clockwise from left: Kate Pillsbury, Dan Rickabus, Ben Zito and Emilee Petersmark

Background information
- Origin: Grand Rapids, Michigan, U.S.
- Genres: Indie rock; Americana; folk
- Years active: 2010–present
- Members: Emilee Petersmark; Kate Pillsbury; Dan Rickabus; Ben Zito
- Past members: Tom Gunnels
- Website: thecranewives.com

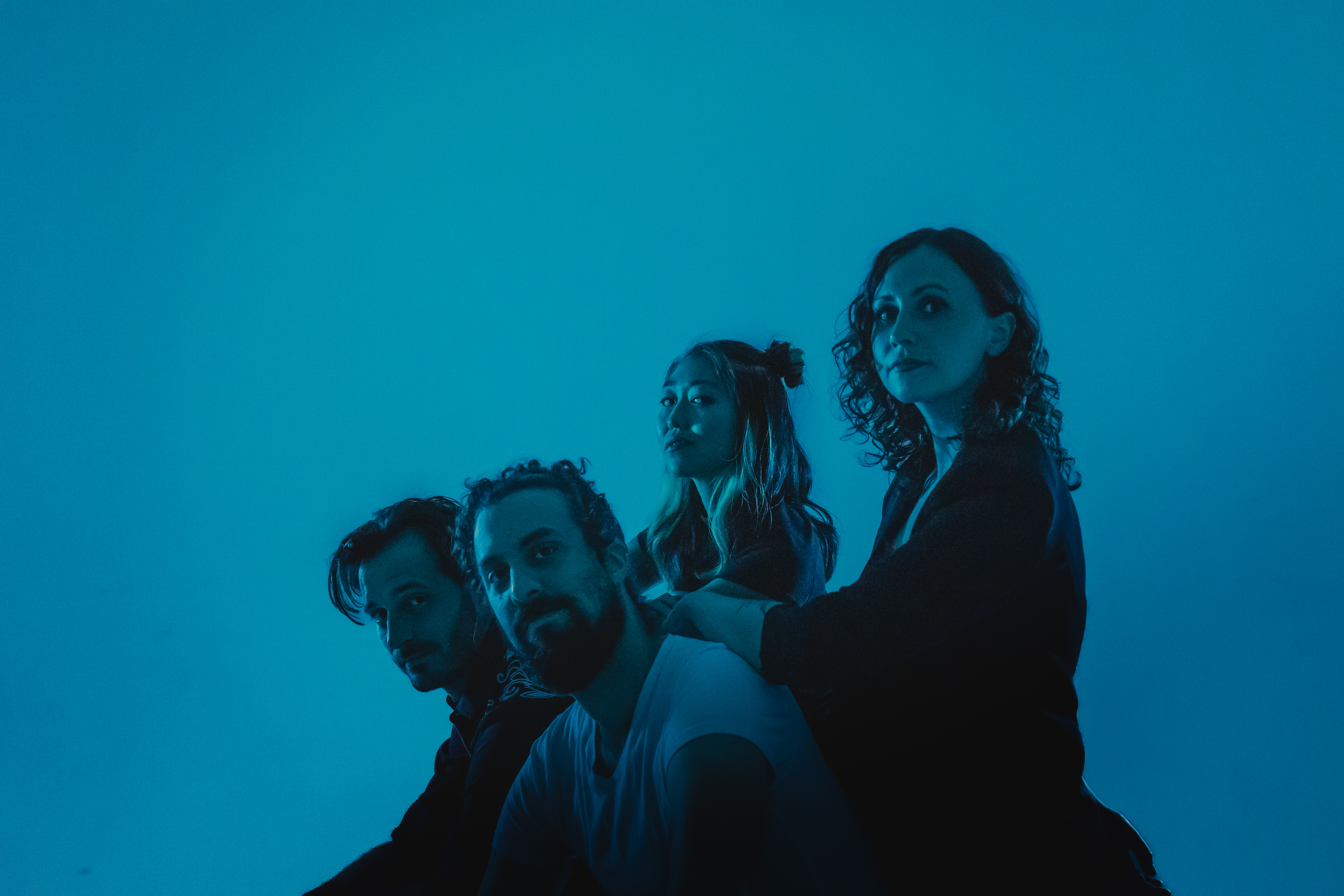

The Crane Wives are a four-piece American indie rock band formed in Grand Rapids, Michigan in 2010. The band currently consists of Emilee Petersmark, Kate Pillsbury, Dan Rickabus, and Ben Zito. They utilize three-part vocal harmonies and eclectic instrumentation.

Since 2010, they have released five studio albums: Safe Ship, Harbored (2010); The Fool in Her Wedding Gown (2012); Coyote Stories (2015); Foxlore (2016); and Beyond Beyond Beyond (2024).

== Career ==
=== Early history ===
Emilee Petersmark (guitar/vocals) and Kate Pillsbury (guitar/vocals) were aspiring solo artists working at a Chinese restaurant in Grandville, Michigan. In an attempt to avoid waiting tables, they began performing weekends in the restaurant as The Crane Wives, named after the album "The Crane Wife" by The Decemberists, itself based on the Japanese folk tale Tsuru Nyōbō (鶴女房; lit. "Crane Wife").

=== Formation and Safe Ship, Harbored (2010–2011) ===
Petersmark and Pillsbury, both students at Grand Valley State University, joined fellow students Dan Rickabus (percussion/vocals) and Tom Gunnels (banjo) for practice sessions in August 2010. The band played a few shows around Grand Rapids, and soon after, friend and fellow Grand Valley student Ben Zito (who ran sound for the band a few times) joined as the band's bass player.

The band's upbeat sound, folk influence, and use of three-part harmony set them apart in the indie rock-dominated Grand Rapids music scene. The members claim a wide variety of influences: folk, blues, ska, punk, and heavy metal.

The Crane Wives self-produced their first full-length CD, Safe Ship Harbored, in May 2011. The album was funded through Kickstarter and produced at Sound Post Studios, where Rickabus worked as a sound engineer.

In June 2011, the band received a degree of national attention when The Decemberists lead singer Colin Meloy saw their album Safe Ship, Harbored at NPR during an interview and had his picture taken with it. In response to the photo, fans and other local artists posted photos to Facebook mimicking Meloy's pose (profile, with the album touching their noses), creating a flood of support. The band had previously attempted to open for The Decemberists at a show at Calvin College, but were unable to secure the spot.

Paste Magazine listed the band among "12 Michigan Acts You Should Listen to Now", and they received the "Local Spin of the Year" from Grand Rapids Press. At WYCE's 2012 "Jammies" award ceremony for West Michigan musicians, the band won WYCE's Album of the Year for Safe Ship Harbored.

=== The Fool in Her Wedding Gown and touring (2012–2014) ===
In 2012, the Crane Wives played music festivals, and toured Michigan and surrounding states in 2013. Their second album, The Fool in Her Wedding Gown, was released September 22, 2012, at The Intersection, a nightclub in Grand Rapids.

The band was in talks with several managers and booking agents but did not sign any deals.

=== Coyote Stories and Foxlore (2015–2020) ===
On August 29, 2015, the band released their album Coyote Stories at Founders Brewing Company in Grand Rapids. Coyote Stories was recorded as part of a two album project, in which the band recorded two albums worth of material in March and April 2015.

The second album from this project, Foxlore was released April 2, 2016. The album's progress from the previous two albums with the addition of electric guitar and jazz influences. The two albums also feature long-time collaborators in the Michigan music community.

Banjo player Tom Gunnels left the band in 2015. Percussionist Dan Rickabus told Local Spins that the group would continue as a four-piece set.

=== Rise in popularity (2020–2023) ===
The Crane Wives rose significantly in popularity in the years during and after the coronavirus pandemic, largely influenced by a resurfacing of their music on social media platforms such as TikTok. The Crane Wives' popularity began to grow during the Covid-19 pandemic, seeing their popularity derive from fandoms appreciating their music. Co-lead, Emilee Petersmark, acknowledged the largely queer youth audience The Crane Wives attracted, and giving the band a similar reputation, stating she felt inspired by "beauty of queer youth", in finding the band's music important to them, further appreciating the community the band creates saying, "Thanks to the Internet, queer people can find other queer people, even if there are no other visible queer people in their neighborhood."

=== Beyond Beyond Beyond (2024–present) ===
On June 4, 2024, the band announced that Beyond Beyond Beyond, their fifth major studio album, would release on September 6, 2024. The same day, they released the album's first single, "Arcturus Beaming," named after the star Arcturus. A second single, "Bitter Medicine", released on July 10, 2024. On August 8, 2024, an additional third single, “Scars” was released.

The album was released on September 6, with a sold-out release party at The Intersection in Grand Rapids, featuring openers Cal in Red and Patty PerShayla, both of whom originate from Grand Rapids.

== Band members ==
=== Current members ===
- Emilee Petersmark (guitar/vocals)
- Kate Pillsbury (guitar/vocals)
- Dan Rickabus (drums/vocals)
- Ben Zito (bass)

=== Former members ===
- Tom Gunnels (banjo) (2010–2015)

== Discography ==
=== Studio ===
Title	Release date
Safe Ship, Harbored	May 12, 2011
The Fool in Her Wedding Gown	September 22, 2012
A Very Crane Wives Christmas	November 28, 2014
Coyote Stories	August 29, 2015
A Very, Very Crane Wives Christmas	December 1, 2015
Foxlore	April 2, 2016
Beyond Beyond Beyond	September 6, 2024

=== Live albums and EPs ===
Title	Release date
Live from River City Studios	2015
Here I Am: Live from the Listening Room	October 14, 2020
Live from Dogtown Studio	2023

=== Singles ===
Title	Release date
High Horse (Live)	2017
Empty Page (Live)	2017
Take Me to War (Live)	2017
Volta (Live)	2017
Daydreamer (Live)	2018
Here I Am	2018
Hollow Moon (Single Version)	2018
Sowing Seeds	2019
The Well	2023
Arcturus Beaming	2024
Bitter Medicine	2024
Scars	2024

== Awards ==
Year	Nominated work	Organization	Award	Result
2011	"Safe Ship, Harbored"	WYCE	Jammies Album of the Year	Won
2011	"Safe Ship, Harbored"	WYCE	Jammies Song of the Year	Won
2011	"Safe Ship, Harbored"	WYCE	Jammies Listen Choice Album of the Year	Won
2011	"Safe Ship, Harbored"	WYCE	Jammies Special Jury Prize	Won
2011	"Safe Ship, Harbored"	Grand Rapids Press	Local Spin of the Year	Won
2012	"The Fool in Her Wedding Gown"	WYCE	Jammies Best Rock/Pop Album	Won
2012	"The Fool in Her Wedding Gown"	WYCE	Jammies Listener Choice Album	Won
2012	"Easier"	ArtPrize	Folk/Country Music Song	Won
2025	"Beyond Beyond Beyond"	WYCE	Jammies Album of the Year	Won
2025	The Crane Wives	WYCE	Critic's Choice Artist of the Year	Won
