= Bello Spark =

American musical group

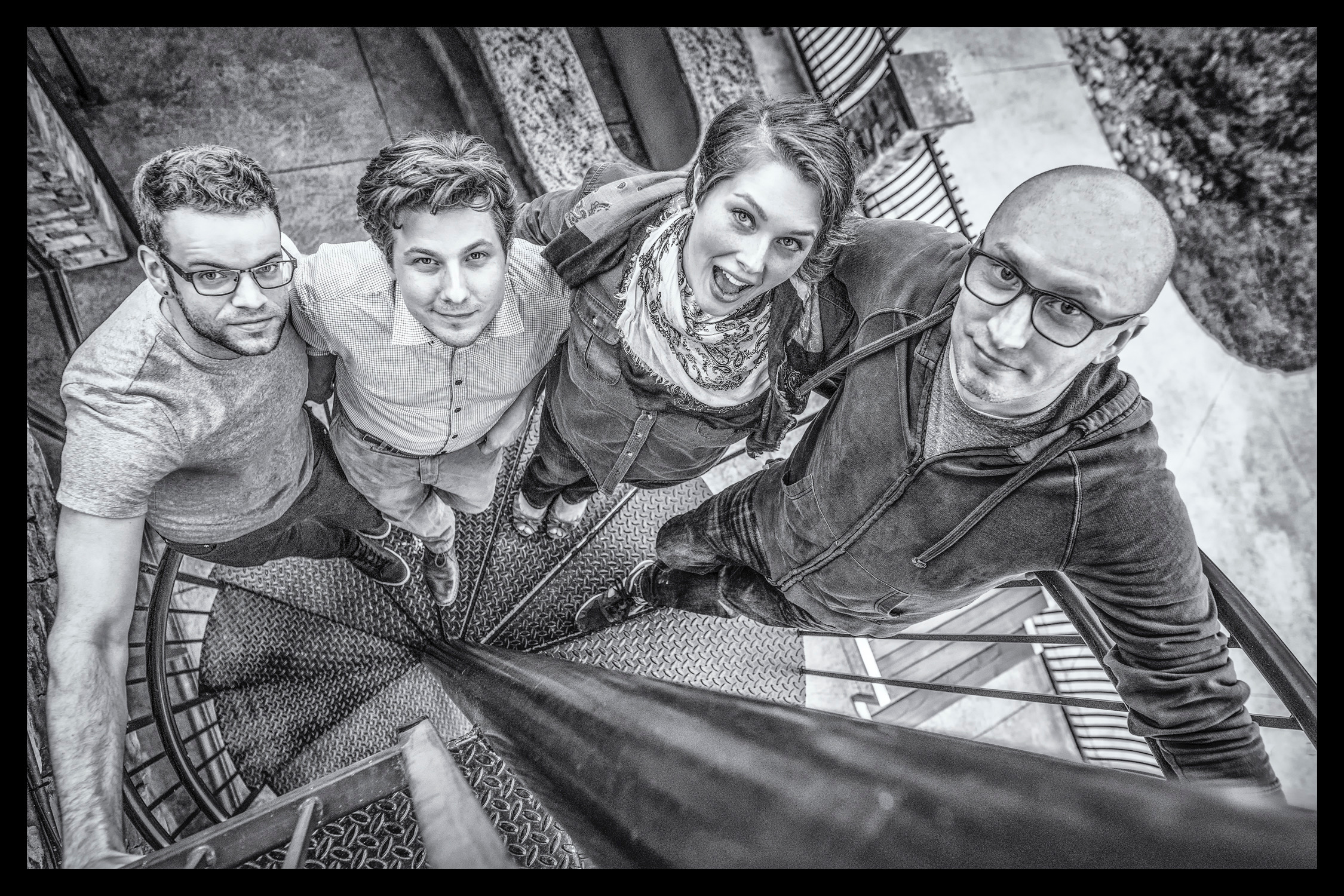
Bello Spark

Bello Spark is an American musical group. The band consists of Rob Jordan, Tory Peterson, Cole Hansen and Jay Kolk. The band has toured in the midwest and central US. Bello Spark has been characterized as many different genres, most commonly Indie rock, Indie folk, and Americana.

Bello Spark was formed in 2011; starting as a two-person collaboration between Rob Jordan and Tory Peterson. Their first album was released in March 2013. The band evolved substantially with the addition of Cole Hansen in 2014, and the development of their second album Among the Lights, culminating in its release in 2016.

== Early years ==
Bello Spark was formed in 2011 starting as a two-person collaboration between Rob Jordan and Tory Peterson. They originally met in 2004 while performing in different bands. In 2012, the band won the iShowcase industry event in Chicago. Their first album was released in March 2013 and won Best Album by a New Artist/Listener's Choice at the 2013 WYCE Jammies. Their first album was on the AAA national airplay on August 9, 2013.

=== South Dakota public radio ===
During a 2013 tour the band performed a concert in Hill City SD which was recorded by South Dakota Public Radio. They then aired the concert on the South Dakota Public Radio network as a part of their "No Cover No Minimum Radio" radio program series. South Dakota Public Radio currently also offers the concert on-line.

=== Linear Music Project ===
The band was invited to participate in the Pennsylvania-based Linear Music Project. This involved developing a song within a certain seasonal and natural sounds framework. This gave birth to their song "Just Like You and Me". The original version for the Linear Music Project remains available but then evolved for their second album.

== Recent Years ==
Singer-songwriter and classically trained vocalist Cole Hansen joining the band in January 2014. This marked the beginning of a period where the band went through a substantial evolution, much of this occurring during the development of their second album. These changes included including vocal, membership and musical style, culminating in the release of their second album.

They have toured the Midwest and Central US; as of June 2015 they had performed in 10 states. Jay Kolk joined the band in June 2015. Their second album was recorded at Grand Rapids’ Mackinaw Harvest Music and released in 2016. In 2016 they won the Pop/Electronic Public award in the Art competition in Grand Rapids Michigan with their song "I'm Awake".

== Style and genre ==
The band combines influences from multiple genres and defies classification into any particular genre. Rob Jordan said that The Civil Wars and Death Cab For Cutie have been musical influences. Jordan said that most of the lyrics that he writes are written from personal experience. Their style includes significant use of paired vocal harmonies, and mixed uses of acoustic and electric instrumentation. Earlier (in a 2013 interview) they described their genre as "whatever genre Coldplay and Snow Patrol are in." In 2013 reviewer Eric Mitts noted: "...Jordan’s raspy vocals might remind some listeners of Marcus Mumford, and Peterson’s leads might ring out like Coldplay..." Their 2016 art prize win was in the pop/electronic genre category. A 2016 WYCE radio interviewer characterized them as Indie Rock among other genres. An WYCE interviewer characterized their harmonies as a confluence of Rob Jordan's raspy voice Cole Hansen angelic voice. A 2013 review referred to them as light rock.

A Holland Sentinel article referred to their music as "uniquely atmospheric, harmony-laden and folk-hued indie-rock", and "semi-Americana’ folk-rock". Another article described their sound as "striking harmonies, insightful songs and distinctive atmospheric-yet-rootsy music...". A 2016 review of their second album described the genre and sound as "Bello Spark’s sophomore release unfolds like an alluring, ethereal dream with the band’s carefully crafted Americana and indie-folk cloaked in cinematic accouterment, propelled by Rob Jordan and Cole Hansen’s striking harmonies and Tory Peterson’s sonically pleasing, mood-altering guitar work"

== Band members ==
The band consists of Rob Jordan, Tory Peterson, Cole Hansen and Jay Kolk. Contributing musicians include Matt Kok, Zach Guy, Jordan Kramer, Steve Sullivan and Christian Van Antwerpen.

Rob Jordan previously performed with the band The grey line Tory Peterson previously performed with The Jim Crawford Band and has currently performed with the rock band Simien the Whale since 2006. Cole Hansen previously performed with Drawing Monsters. Jay Kolk previously performed with Spencer Mulder.

== Discography ==
=== Bello Spark (2013) ===
Parade, All You Can, High and Low, Infallible, Either Way, On Top of the World, Momma Said, When I was Young, Slow Down, Last All Night, Morning, Momma Said

=== Among the Lights (2016) ===
Back to Michigan, I'm Awake, Good Things, Traveling Companion, Just Like You and Me, Among the Lights, Shauna's Song, One Day at a Time, The Home I Build, Pulling You Around

=== Third studio album ===
The band is recording its third studio album and debuted two songs from it (“Strange Days” and “You Are My Shelter”) in a June 2018 WYCE radio broadcast. "It’s safe to say Bello Spark has a wealth of original material ready to set loose on the public at large."
