= 104.2 FM =

FM radio frequency

The following radio stations broadcast on FM frequency 104.2 MHz:

== United Kingdom ==
- 3FM in Ramsey and Port St Mary
- BBC Radio Cumbria in Windermere
- BBC Radio Kent in East Kent
- BBC Radio nan Gàidheal in Aberdeenshire, Fort William, Inveraray and South Uist
- BBC Radio Northampton in West Northamptonshire
- Sedgemoor FM in Bridgwater
