= The Decemberists: A Practical Handbook =

- Directed by: Jeff Feller
- Produced by: Aaron Stewart-Ahn
- Release date: March 3, 2006 (United States)
- Running time: 100 minutes
- Country: United States
- Language: English

The Decemberists: A Practical Handbook is a 2007 film featuring indie rock band The Decemberists. The film includes music videos, a live concert, and documentary footage.

== Content ==
The documentary section, titled Paris Before the War, concerns the creation and subsequent recording of the band's album Picaresque. It includes both interviews and footage of the band recording, in a church in northeast Portland with Chris Walla producing. According to the documentary, the band has always been particularly enthusiastic about "The Mariner's Revenge Song," which appears on Picaresque and which they often perform at concerts, because it was the only song they were able to record live. Colin Meloy also discusses his previous band Tarkio and his motivation for moving to Portland. Of the song "My Mother Was a Chinese Trapeze Artist," first recorded with Tarkio and re-recorded by the Decemberists for their EP 5 Songs, Meloy says that he wrote it to amuse his girlfriend Carson Ellis.

Another section of the DVD documents an 80-minute live concert at the Roseland Theater in Portland, on November 4, 2005, one of the final concerts of its Picaresque tour. The band played songs from all their albums to date, including "The Mariner's Revenge Song," "The Chimbley Sweep," "The Sporting Life," and "I Was Meant for the Stage." Scott McCaughey guested; Petra Haden, who by that point had left the band, also appeared.

Music videos are included for "The Tain," "Sixteen Military Wives," "The Bachelor and the Bride," "The Soldiering Life," and "Here I Dreamt I Was an Architect."

== Reception ==
Critical reviews were mixed. The documentary section was described as "dry" and unengaging, and as chronicling "perhaps the least interesting chapter in the band's history"; but also as "cute", "nothing short of endearing" and "rewarding.". Some viewed the concert segment favorably, though others noted that the first half dragged or that the "awkward" and "disappointing" performance was "not, by far, the Decemberists’ best." The music videos, however, were mostly praised. CMJ New Music Monthly criticized the poor-quality editing of the DVD.
