= East Kent =

- Proposed unitary authority area
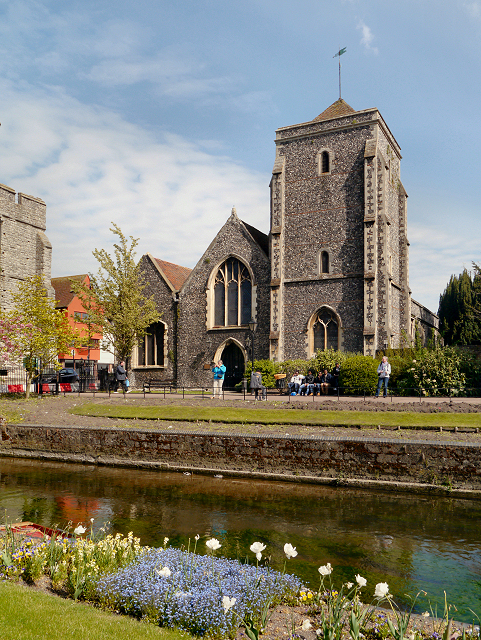
- Canterbury

- Interactive map
- Coordinates: 51.2793°N 1.0797°E
- Sovereign state: United Kingdom
- Country: England
- Region: South East
- Ceremonial county: Kent

Government
  - Type: Unitary authority
  - Body: East Kent Council

Area
  - Total: 281 sq mi (728 km^{2})

Population (2024 estimate)
  - Total: 424,559
- Time zone: UTC+0 (GMT)
  - Summer (DST): UTC+1 (BST)

East Kent was a proposed unitary authority area in Kent, England. It is was planned to be formed on 1 April 2028. The largest settlement would have been Margate and it would also have included Broadstairs, Canterbury, Deal, Dover, Ramsgate, Herne Bay and Whitstable.

It was to be formed from the Canterbury, Dover and Thanet districts. The district will include Canterbury Cathedral (a World Heritage Site) and the Dover to Kingsdown Cliffs, including the White Cliffs of Dover.

Bounded by the sea on three sides, it would only border one other district: Mid Kent. Canterbury, Herne Bay, Margate and Whitstable are currently unparished, the rest of the area is parished. The area has a 2024 estimated population of 424,559.

Plans to create it were halted in September 2026 and the 2027 election was cancelled. In October 2026, the plans to create it were withdrawn.

== History ==
=== Pre 21st-century ===
Under different boundaries, defined as the area east of the River Medway, East Kent was a traditional subdivision of Kent. It was advocated by the Association of the Men of Kent and Kentish Men, an organisation formed in 1913. The division may have risen from the ethnic differences approximately 1,500 years ago between the Jutish settlement of the east of the county and the Saxon presence in the west, although its origins are somewhat obscure. Residents of the traditional East Kent are called 'Men (or Maids) of Kent', as opposed to residents of West Kent, who are known as 'Kentish Men' or 'Kentish Maids'.

According to the BBC, a few hundred years later, it appears that the Men of Kent resisted William the Conqueror more stoutly than the Kentish Men, who surrendered.

East Kent had its own Quarter Sessions based in Canterbury until 1814, when the administrations of East and West Kent were merged. East Kent, which corresponded roughly to the Diocese of Canterbury, consisted of the three lathes: Lathe of St Augustine, Lathe of Shepway and the upper division of the Lathe of Scray.

=== 21st century ===
East Kent was first formed by proposals brought by Kent district councils as part of structural changes to local government in England which began in 2024. Prior to the local government reform, most of Kent had a two-tier system where Kent County Council and would provide local services..

Following the 2024 Devolution White Paper, the ruling Labour Party announced that the government would seek to establish unitary authorities in the remaining two-tier areas including Kent. In February 2025, the government wrote to the local authorities in Kent asking them to submit proposals for two-tier areas under the Local Government and Public Involvement in Health Act 2007. An East Kent district was included in all the proposals brought forward by district councils while a single-unitary option merging Kent and Medway was supported by the county council.

The option proposed by Dover District Council and Thanet District Council, Option 4b, was selected by the government in July 2026 with the districts as planned. The alternative proposal for four unitaries and the proposals for a single unitary, or three or five unitaries were not accepted. Caterbury City Council had supported a modified Option 4, called Option 4d, in which the district would have included most of Folkestone and Hythe and some of Swale.

In September 2026, the Kent proposals were halted by the government and placed under review. In October 2026, plans to create it were withdrawn. The decision was threatened with judicial review by Kent County Council.

== Governance ==
It would be run by East Kent Council, which will comprise 66 councillors.

== See also ==
- Buffs (Royal East Kent Regiment)
