= The Tain (EP) =

EP by the Decemberists
- Released: March 4, 2004
- Recorded: Hall of Justice, Seattle, Washington, August 2003
- Genres: Progressive rock, indie rock, folk rock, baroque pop
- Length: 18:35
- Label: Kill Rock Stars
- Producers: The Decemberists, Christopher Walla

The Decemberists EP chronology
Her Majesty the Decemberists (2003)	The Tain (2004)	Picaresque (2005)

Professional ratings
Review scores
Source	Rating
AllMusic	link
Kludge	6/10 link
Pitchfork	7.7/10 link

The Tain is an EP by the Decemberists released in 2004 by Acuarela Discos and in 2005 by Kill Rock Stars. The single 18-plus minute track, in five parts, is named after the Irish mythological epic Táin Bó Cúailnge, often simply called The Táin. With production help from Chris Walla of Death Cab for Cutie, the Decemberists recorded the EP over the course of four days in Walla's studio in Seattle, Washington. The album cover was designed by the Portland artist Carson Ellis, who is Colin Meloy's wife and has created artwork for each of the group's albums.

The accompanying video by Andy Smetanka does tell the traditional Tain story with silhouettes interspersed by minimal captions, in the manner of a silent movie, but the action in the video proceeds completely independent of the music. As well, a music video for the track was made entirely from silhouette crepe paper stop motion animation, and is available on The Decemberists: A Practical Handbook DVD and band's YouTube page.
