= O Valencia! =

Single by the Decemberists

from the album The Crane Wife
- Released: September 19, 2006
- Genre: Indie rock
- Length: 3:47
- Label: Capitol
- Songwriters: The Decemberists; Colin Meloy

The Decemberists singles chronology
"Sixteen Military Wives" (2005)	"O Valencia!" (2006)	"The Perfect Crime #2" (2007)

"O Valencia!" is the fifth single by the indie rock band the Decemberists, and the first released from their fourth studio album, The Crane Wife.

The music was written by The Decemberists and the lyrics by Colin Meloy. It tells a story of two star-crossed lovers. The singer falls in love with a person who belongs to an opposing gang. At the end of the song, the singer's lover jumps in to defend the singer, who is confronting his lover's brother (the singer's "sworn enemy") and is killed by the bullet intended for the singer.

== Track listing ==
The 7" single sold in the UK was mispressed, with "Culling of the Fold" as the B-side despite the artwork and record label listing "After the Bombs" as the B-side.

== Music videos ==
For the "O Valencia!" music video, the Decemberists filmed themselves in front of a green screen and asked fans to complete it by digitally adding in background images or footage. Stephen Colbert of The Colbert Report, having recently asked fans to do the same with a video of him with a light saber in front of a green screen, brought up the Decemberists on his segment "Look Who's Riding on My Coattails Now" and accused the band of stealing the idea. The Decemberists' response was to challenge Stephen Colbert to a guitar solo showdown on December 20, 2006, on The Colbert Report.

Kurt Nishimura was chosen as the winner by mtvU for his video that depicted a love affair between a woman and her television, with the TV containing the green-screened Decemberists video footage.

On January 19, 2007, the Decemberists premiered an alternate music video of "O Valencia!", directed by Aaron Stewart-Ahn, on MTV2. The video follows a character named Patrick, played by Meloy, as he and his love Francesca (Lisa Molinaro), daughter of "the Boss", plan an escape to an unknown location. At a cafe, a man in a suit, portrayed by the band member Chris Funk, tells him to hide in the "Valencia" hotel (the Super Value Inn on North Interstate Avenue in Portland, Oregon) while he gets them the necessary documentation to escape. Above the name of the hotel, there is a neon sign that reads "Office". The letters have all burnt out except for the "O", creating the title of the song. The video then introduces other characters - various assassination teams - who sit in different rooms of the hotel waiting for the chance to catch the two lovers. Most are portrayed by other members of the band (along with Meloy's wife, Carson Ellis). They kill off any potential witnesses to their plan. Patrick manages to take down one member from each team, before they gang up on him. The Boss arrives, along with the man from the cafe, who reveals that he snitched on Patrick and Francesca. They execute Francesca, while forcing Patrick to watch. After they leave, Patrick finds a note by Francesca, which reveals that she never fell in love with him, and only wanted protection. 2 months later, Patrick and the man, who has lost an eye from a previous assassination attempt, have a sit-down at the same cafe. The man reveals that he snitched on Patrick just to take over the town. Patrick reveals that he poisoned a drink the man was having, but before he could get away, the man stabs Patrick in the neck with a fork before dying, followed by Patrick.
