= The Crane Wife =

Studio album by the Decemberists
- Released: October 3, 2006
- Recorded: March–June 2006
- Genres: Indie rock; progressive folk; progressive rock; art rock
- Length: 60:15
- Label: Capitol/Rough Trade
- Producers: Tucker Martine, Christopher Walla, The Decemberists

The Decemberists chronology
Picaresqueties (2005)	The Crane Wife (2006)	The Hazards of Love (2009)

Singles from The Crane Wife
- 1. "O Valencia!" Released: September 19, 2006; 2. "The Perfect Crime #2" Released: September 26, 2007

The Crane Wife is the fourth album by the Decemberists, released in 2006. It was produced by Tucker Martine and Chris Walla, and is the band's first album on the Capitol Records label. The album was inspired by a Japanese folk tale, and centers on two song cycles, The Crane Wife and The Island, the latter inspired by William Shakespeare's The Tempest. National Public Radio listeners voted The Crane Wife the best album of 2006.

The album cover was designed by the Portland artist Carson Ellis, Colin Meloy's wife, who has created artwork for each of the band's albums.

== The story of The Crane Wife ==
The Crane Wife is an old Japanese folktale. While there are many variations of the tale, a common version is that a poor man finds an injured crane on his doorstep (or outside with an arrow in it), takes it in and nurses it back to health. After he releases the crane, a woman appears at his doorstep with whom he falls in love and marries. Because they need money, his wife offers to weave wondrous clothes out of silk that they can sell at the market, but only if he agrees never to watch her making them. They begin to sell them and live a comfortable life, but he soon makes her weave them more and more. Oblivious to his wife's declining health, his greed increases. He eventually peeks in to see what she is doing to make the silk she weaves so desirable. He is shocked to discover that at the loom is a crane plucking feathers from her own body and weaving them into the loom. The crane, seeing him, flies away and never returns.

== "When the War Came" ==
"When the War Came"

Song by The Decemberists

from the album The Crane Wife
- Released: October 3, 2006
- Length: 5:06
- Label: Capitol Records/Rough Trade Records
- Songwriter: Colin Meloy

This song is a portrayal of the 900-day Siege of Leningrad during the Second World War. During the siege, the German army surrounded the city entirely, preventing anything from going in or out. As a result, many died of starvation, and the final death-toll is estimated to be over one million. The song also has a political undertone to it; it is stated that despite the fact that people put their faith in the government which swore to protect them, they ended up being left unprepared and unequipped to fight off the Germans. The song references Nikolai Vavilov, a Russian botanist who died in a Soviet prison camp, in the lyrics. Colin Meloy explained:

The last great book I read was Hunger by Elise Blackwell. It's about the siege of Leningrad in World War II, and there was a botanical institute. During the siege, which lasted a long time, the entire population was starving, but all of the botanists in the institute swore themselves to protect the catalog of seeds and plants and things, from not only a starving population, but also from themselves. It's pretty amazing. I actually ended up writing "When the War Came", a song on the new record, about that.

== "Shankill Butchers" ==
"Shankill Butchers"

Song by The Decemberists

from the album The Crane Wife
- Released: October 3, 2006
- Length: 4:40
- Label: Capitol Records/Rough Trade Records
- Songwriter: Colin Meloy

"Shankill Butchers" is about the Shankill Butchers, a faction of the Ulster Volunteer Force. The UVF is a Loyalist paramilitary organization. The Shankill Butchers split off from the UVF in the mid-1970s and carried out a series of grisly murders. These are the basis of the song. The Butchers abducted seven random Catholic citizens of Northern Ireland and killed them in the middle of the night by slashing their throats. They also carried out several other shootings and bomb attacks, killing as many as 32 people.

== Track listing ==
All songs written by Colin Meloy.

No.	Title	Length
1.	"The Crane Wife 3"	4:18
2.	"The Island: Come and See/The Landlord's Daughter/You'll Not Feel the Drowning"	12:26
3.	"Yankee Bayonet (I Will Be Home Then)"	4:19
4.	"O Valencia!"	3:48
5.	"The Perfect Crime #2"	5:33
6.	"When the War Came"	5:06
7.	"Shankill Butchers"	4:40
8.	"Summersong"	3:31
9.	"The Crane Wife 1 & 2"	11:20
10.	"Sons & Daughters"	5:14
Total length:		60:15

2017 10th Anniversary Edition bonus disc
No.	Title	Length
1.	"Yankee Bayonet (I Will Be Home Then) (Alternate Take)"	4:22
2.	"Culling Of The Fold (Alternate Take)"	4:30
3.	"Hurdles Even Here (Full Band Take)"	5:56
4.	"The Perfect Crime #2 (Early Take)"	6:29
5.	"The Island; Come And See-The Landlord's Daughter-You'll Not Feel The Drowning"	10:58
6.	"O Valencia! (Home Demo)"	3:48
7.	"The Perfect Crime #2 (Home Demo)"	7:04
8.	"Yankee Bayonet (I Will Be Home Then) (Home Demo)"	4:34
9.	"The Capp Street Girls (Home Demo)"	2:58
10.	"Culling Of The Fold (Home Demo)"	4:32
11.	"Hurdles Even Here (Home Demo)"	4:43
12.	"Shankill Butchers (Home Demo)"	4:22
13.	"Summersong (Home Demo)"	3:09
14.	"The Day I Knew You'd Not Come Back (Home Demo)"	6:32
15.	"The Perfect Crime #1 (Home Demo)"	4:33
16.	"The Crane Wife 1, 2 & 3 (Home Demo)"	12:49
17.	"Sons & Daughters (Home Demo)"	4:39
Total length:		1:31:19

Bonus tracks

- "After the Bombs" (iTunes bonus track) – 5:04
- "Culling of the Fold" (Tower Records bonus track) – 4:24
- "The Perfect Crime #1 + The Day I Knew You'd Not Come Back" (Starbucks bonus track) – 15:17
- "Hurdles Even Here" (Starbucks bonus track) – 4:31

== Reception ==
Professional ratings
Aggregate scores
Source	Rating
Metacritic	84/100
Review scores
Source	Rating
AllMusic	3.5/5 stars
The A.V. Club	A
Blender	4/5 stars
Entertainment Weekly	B+
The Guardian	4/5 stars
NME	6/10
Pitchfork	8.4/10
Rolling Stone	3.5/5 stars
Spin	4/5 stars
Uncut	4/5 stars

The Crane Wife was highly acclaimed by music critics, earning an 84% positive out of all reviews culled by Metacritic, and remains one of the Decemberists' best-reviewed efforts. Jim DeRogatis of the Chicago Sun-Times praised its progressive rock influences with the tongue-in-cheek description "the best Jethro Tull album since Heavy Horses". Stephen M. Deusner of Pitchfork wrote that the album "further magnifies and refines [the Decemberists'] strengths" and that their folk rock has been "honed to an incisively sharp point". It was ranked number 41 on Pitchfork's list of the top 50 albums of 2006, number 19 on PopMatters' list of the top 60 albums of 2006, and JustPressPlay named it the second best album of the 2000s. In a listener poll by National Public Radio, The Crane Wife was picked as the number 1 album of 2006.

== Release ==
As of February 2009 it had sold 289,000 copies in the United States, according to Nielsen SoundScan, close to 100,000 more than the band's final Kill Rock Stars release, "Picaresque".

== Personnel ==
According to the liner notes of The Crane Wife.

=== The Decemberists ===
- Colin Meloy – vocals, guitar, bouzouki, percussion
- Chris Funk – guitar, pedal steel, bouzouki, banjo, hammered dulcimer, hurdy-gurdy, percussion, backing vocals
- Jenny Conlee – piano, Wurlitzer, pump organ, Hammond organ, Moog synthesizer, accordion, glockenspiel, percussion, backing vocals
- Nate Query – upright bass, electric bass, cello, percussion, backing vocals
- John Moen – drums, percussion, backing vocals

=== Additional musicians ===
- Laura Veirs – duet vocal on "Yankee Bayonet (I Will Be Home Then)"
- Eyvind Kang – viola, violin
- Ezra Holbrook – backing vocals
- Christopher Walla – backing vocals, keyboards
- Steve Drizos – hand drums

=== Production ===
- Produced by Tucker Martine and Christopher Walla with The Decemberists
- Mixed by Tucker Martine and Christopher Walla
- Mastered by Roger Seibel
- Assistant engineering by Rich Hipp
- Design by Carson Ellis, Colin Meloy and Mike King
- Illustrations and lettering by Carson Ellis
- Layout by Mike King
- Band portraits drawn from photographs by Autumn de Wilde

== In popular culture ==
- "The Crane Wife 3" was covered by Marianne Faithfull on her album Easy Come, Easy Go. She performed it live when she appeared on the Late Show with David Letterman on March 31, 2009, and on Later… with Jools Holland, transmitted on April 14, 2009, on the British BBC2 TV channel.
- "Sons & Daughters" is covered by the Schrute Family in The Office Season 9, Episode 17, The Farm.
- "Sons & Daughters" is featured in Marvel's Cloak & Dagger Season 1, Episode 7, Lotus Eaters.
- "The Crane Wife 3" is featured in The Bear Season 2, Episode 8, "Bolognese".
- The Crane Wives, an indie band from Michigan, selected their name in honor of this album.
- The Decemberists appeared in Parks and Recreation Season 6 finale as one of the bands in the fictional Pawnee/Eagleton Unity Concert where they played "The Crane Wife 3".
