= Patty PerShayla =

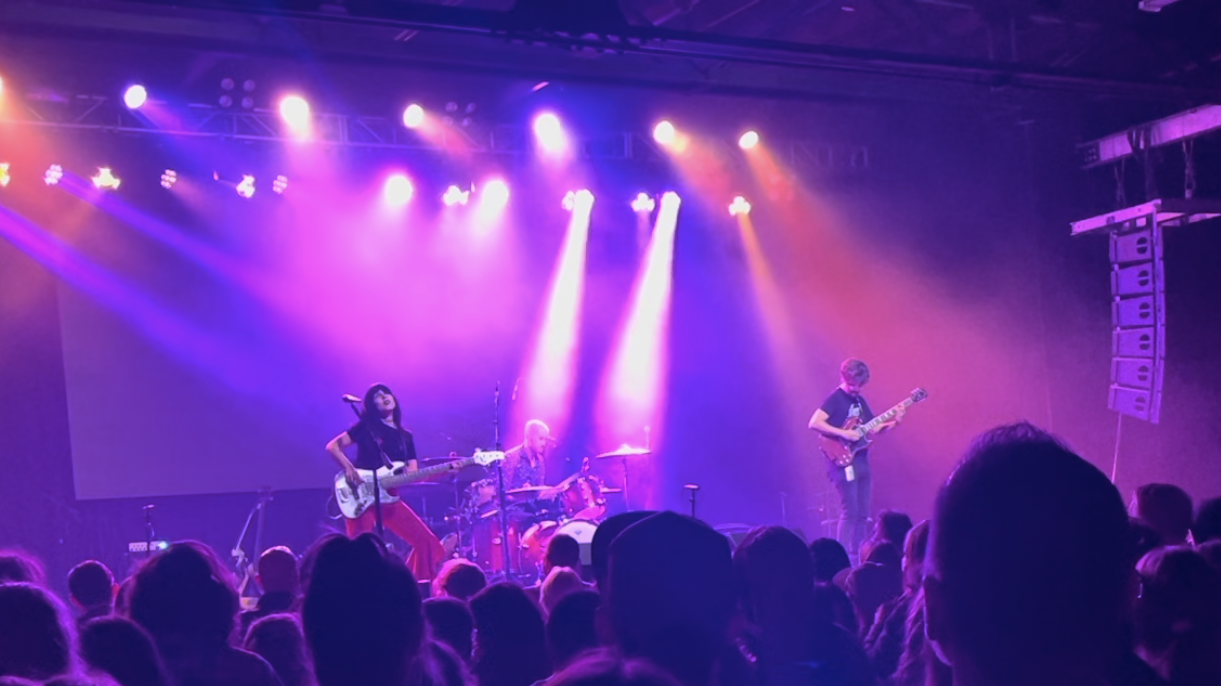
- Patty Pershayla & The Mayhaps performing in Grand Rapids (2024)

Background information
- Also known as: Patty Pershayla & The Mayhaps (2019-2024)

Patty PerShayla (known as Patty PerShayla & The Mayhaps from 2019-2024) is a rock band consisting of bassist/vocalist Patty PerShayla, guitarist Lucas Powell, and drummer Dave Hempstead. The group formed in Grand Rapids, Michigan in 2019, before relocating to Nashville, Tennessee.

== History and members ==
- Patty PerShayla: bass, vocals
- Lucas Powell: guitar
- Dave Hempstead: drums

Removed "& The Mayhaps" in 2024

== Discography ==
=== Albums & EPs ===
Title	Year	Credited as	Album/EP
SAD GIRL APOCALYPSE: bummer songs and ukulele	2024	Patty PerShayla	Album
Perpetual Motion Machine	2023	Patty PerShayla & The Mayhaps	EP
Cheap Diction	2021	Patty PerShayla & The Mayhaps	Album
Good with Words 'n' Sh't	2020	Patty PerShayla & The Mayhaps	EP
Oracle Bones	2019	Patty PerShayla	EP

=== Singles ===
Title	Year	Credited as
Do It for Me	2021	Patty PerShayla & The Mayhaps
Candy	2019	Patty PerShayla

== Awards ==
Perpetual Motion Machine won "Best Rock/Pop Album" at the WYCE Jammie Awards 2024

The music video for "Do It for Me" was nominated for Michigan Music Video Awards 2023
