= On a Piece of Chalk =

Book by Thomas Huxley

- Hardcover edition
- Author: Thomas Henry Huxley
- Genre: Non-fiction
- Published: 1868 (Macmillan's Magazine); 1967 (Scribner)
- OCLC: 504632
- Website: mathcs.clarku.edu/huxley/CE8/Chalk.html

On a Piece of Chalk was a lecture given by Thomas Henry Huxley on 26 August 1868 to the working men of Norwich during a meeting of the British Association for the Advancement of Science. It was published as an essay in Macmillan's Magazine in London later that year. The piece reconstructs the geological history of Britain from a simple piece of chalk and demonstrates science as "organized common sense".

On a Piece of Chalk was republished by Scribner in 1967 with an introduction by Loren Eiseley and illustrations by Rudolf Freund.

== Reception ==
In 1967, Dael Wolfle of the AAAS gave a favorable review for On a Piece of Chalk, writing:

That the lessons of paleontology are now so much more widely appreciated than they were when Huxley drew them from a piece of carpenter's chalk is in good measure a tribute to Huxley's genius. We have much more factual knowledge than he had, but we have no better exemplar of the art of explaining in compelling and understandable terms what science is about, nor a more vigorous example of the scientist's obligation to practice that art.

In April 2015, physicist and Nobel laureate Steven Weinberg included On a Piece of Chalk in a personal list of "the 13 best science books for the general reader".

== See also ==
- White Cliffs of Dover
