= Sixteen Military Wives =

Single by The Decemberists

from the album Picaresque
- B-side: "The Kingdom of Spain", "From My Own True Love"
- Released: November 21, 2005
- Genre: Indie rock, indie pop
- Label: Rough Trade
- Songwriter: Colin Meloy

The Decemberists singles chronology
"Billy Liar" (2004)	"Sixteen Military Wives" (2005)	"O Valencia!" (2006)

"Sixteen Military Wives", sometimes referred to as "16 by 32", is a single released by The Decemberists from their third album, Picaresque.

== Track listing ==
=== CD ===
1. "Sixteen Military Wives"
2. "The Kingdom of Spain"
3. "Sixteen Military Wives" (Video)

=== 7" ===
1. "Sixteen Military Wives"
2. "From My Own True Love" (Demo)

== Subject ==
Songwriter Colin Meloy has characterized the song as a "protest song" inspired by the Iraq War. However, though it does attack elements of American foreign policy under George W. Bush (the lines "'Cause America can/and America can't say no/And America does,/if America says it's so,/it's so" in the chorus), "Sixteen Military Wives" focuses primarily on the news media and popular response to the war, particularly levying criticism at infotainment and the surface-level involvement of celebrities in public affairs.

== Video ==
Shot at Cleveland High School in Portland, Oregon, the video takes place at the fictional Barger Rothery Academy. Colin Meloy plays Henry Stowecroft, a student who represents the United States in the school's Model UN. Fed up with Jude (Nate Query), another student who seems to surpass him on every occasion, Henry goes after Carl (Chris Funk), a shy student who mostly keeps to himself, by initiating a campaign of harassment. Within the Model UN, the U.S. declares war on Luxembourg, the country Carl represents. Henry has his lackeys block Carl from using the bathroom, pelts Carl with crumpled paper projectiles, gets the lunch lady to deny Carl food service, and plants contraband in Carl's locker and then reports him to school authorities. Molly (Jenny Conlee) leads a revolt against Henry by recruiting the rest of the Model UN to perform a protest song during a meeting of the club. Henry, defeated, flees the meeting, and the video ends with him buried in crumpled papers thrown at him by his enraged classmates.

The notion of Henry, representing the United States, bullying a smaller country reflects the song's lyrical meaning.

The video was the first to ever be originally released for online distribution via BitTorrent. It was co-produced by Nick Harmer of Death Cab for Cutie. He also makes a cameo appearance in the video. He had been erroneously credited with a co-director credit by MTV2's Subterranean due to a mistake in the chyron.

Other cameos include Chris Walla from Death Cab for Cutie, also the album's producer, John Roderick from The Long Winters, and Carson Ellis, the band's artist and longtime partner to Colin Meloy.

The video was directed by Aaron Stewart-Ahn, who also helmed the band's video for "O Valencia!"; and appears to be drawn stylistically from Wes Anderson's films, particularly Rushmore, from which it borrows the prestigious private school setting and similar school uniforms, as well as themes of rivalry between students. Additionally, Rushmore featured a brief segment concerning a model United Nations at the school. Henry's haircut in the video is quite similar to the one sported by Max in the film.

There are several inconsistencies in the video. The story text in the video states that one of Henry's friends represents the Republic of Korea, but the flag is clearly the flag of Democratic People's Republic of Korea (though this may be a reference to a very similar shot in Rushmore in which Max displays the flag of the Soviet Union, despite the onscreen text identifying him as Russia, and the film debuting seven years after the dissolution of the USSR). Moreover, one of the students in the background, wearing a straw hat and a placard indicating Singapore, has the flag of North Macedonia. When in the lunch line, you can see a poster on the left saying "CHS Cares". CHS stands for Cleveland High School, where the video was filmed. It should say "BRA Cares", because that is the fictional school in the video.

== See also ==
- List of anti-war songs
