= The Perfect Crime No. 2 =

"The Perfect Crime #2"

Single by The Decemberists

from the album The Crane Wife
- Released: September 26, 2007
- Genre: Indie rock
- Length: 5:33
- Label: Capitol
- Songwriters: The Decemberists; Colin Meloy

The Decemberists singles chronology
| "O Valencia!" (2006) | "The Perfect Crime #2" (2007) | "Always the Bridesmaid: Volume I" (2008) |

"The Perfect Crime #2" is a song on the American indie rock band The Decemberists' fourth album, The Crane Wife. The song is a sequel to "The Perfect Crime #1", a song which did not appear on The Crane Wife and was later released as a bonus track.

"The Perfect Crime #2" was released as a single in September 2007, the second single released from The Crane Wife (following "O Valencia!"). This was the first time The Decemberists have released more than one single from an album.

== Track listing ==
Digital Download/12" Single (US)

1. "The Perfect Crime #2 (A Touch of Class Robs the Bank Remix)"
2. "The Perfect Crime #2 (Diplo's Doing Time Remix)"
3. "The Perfect Crime #2 (Junior Boys Remix)"
4. "The Perfect Crime #2 (The Perfect Crime #2.5.1)"

== Charts ==
| Chart (2007) | Peak position |
|---|---|
| U.S. Billboard Hot Dance Singles Sales | 3 |
