= Picaresqueties =

EP by the Decemberists
- Released: September 13, 2005
- Genres: Indie rock, folk rock
- Length: 20:23
- Producers: The Decemberists, Chris Walla

The Decemberists EP chronology
Picaresque (2005)	Picaresqueties (2005)	The Crane Wife (2006)

Picaresqueties is a five-track EP released by the band the Decemberists as a companion disc to the double-vinyl edition of their LP Picaresque. It contains previously unreleased material from the Picaresque recording sessions.

Besides being packaged with Picaresque on vinyl, Picaresqueties can also be purchased from the iTunes Store, eMusic, and Amazon Music.

== Track listing ==
All songs written by Colin Meloy, except where noted.

No.	Title	Length
1.	"The Bandit Queen (with dialogue and tap dancing)"	4:27
2.	"Bridges and Balloons" (Joanna Newsom)	3:20
3.	"Constantinople"	3:42
4.	"Kingdom of Spain"	3:50
5.	"The Bandit Queen"	4:34
Total length:		19:50
