= White Cliffs of Dover =

English cliff shore

- Sea cliffs
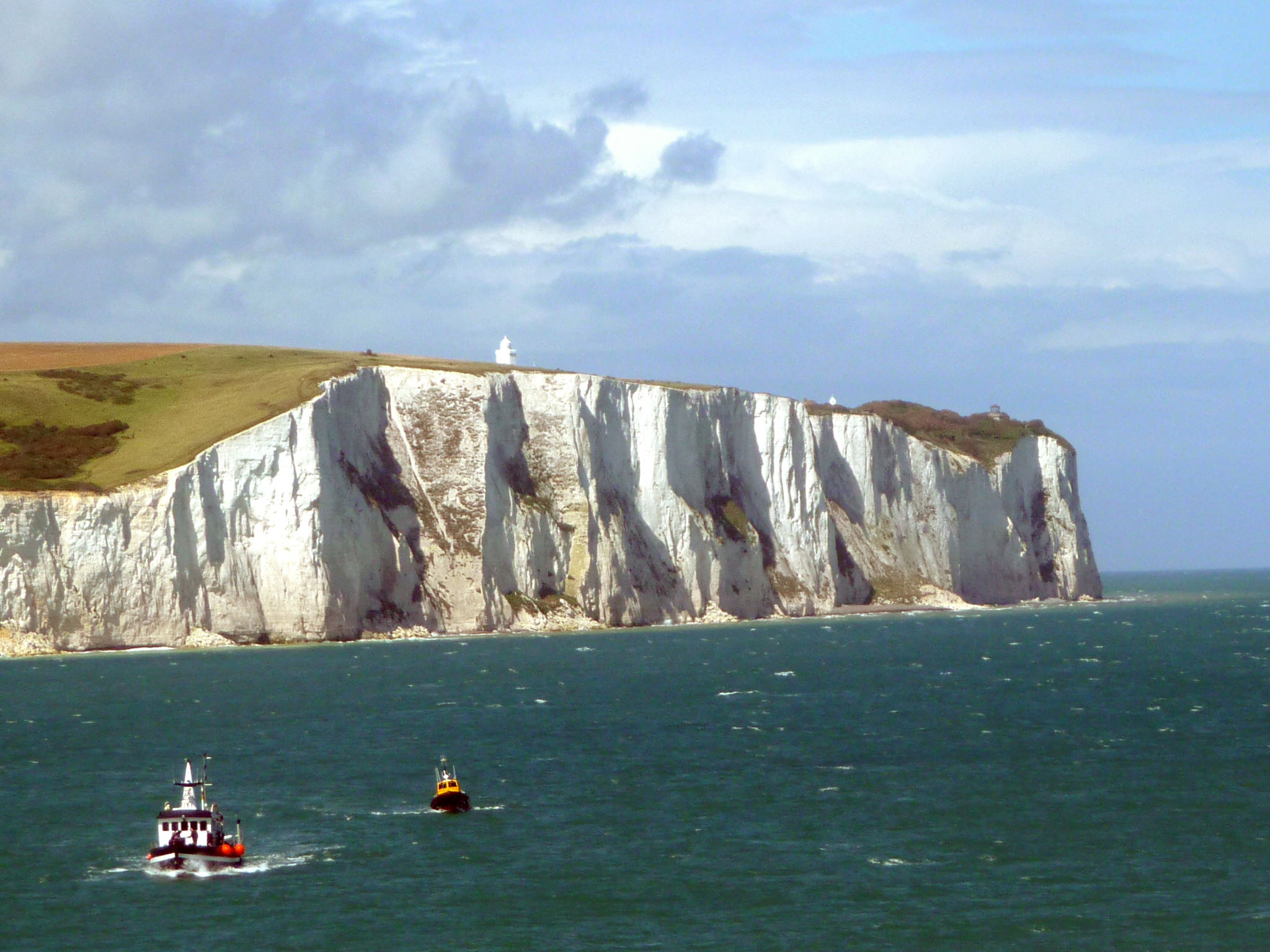
- Viewed from the Strait of Dover

- Location within Kent
- Coordinates: 51°06′28″N 1°16′43″E
- Grid position: TR326419
- Location: Kent, England

The White Cliffs of Dover are the region of English coastline facing the Strait of Dover and France. The cliff face, which reaches a height of 350 feet (110 m), owes its striking appearance to its composition of chalk accented by streaks of black flint, deposited during the Late Cretaceous. The cliffs, on both sides of the town of Dover in Kent, stretch for eight miles (13 km). The White Cliffs of Dover form part of the North Downs. The cliffs are part of the Dover to Kingsdown Cliffs Site of Special Scientific Interest and Special Area of Conservation. The top of the cliffs hosts a chalk grassland ecosystem with an abundance of bird, flower, and butterfly species.

The cliffs mark the point where Great Britain is closest to continental Europe; on a clear day the cliffs are visible from France, approximately 20 miles (32 km) away. A celebrated UK landmark, their striking appearance has met visitors since ancient times. Julius Caesar remarked upon their appearance when he invaded Britain in 55 BC. The cliffs served as a natural defensive barrier, reinforced by the building of Dover Castle in the 11th century. The cliffs gained symbolic importance during World War II, as a symbol of Britain's resolute defence and as a welcome sight for the evacuees from Dunkirk.

== Location ==
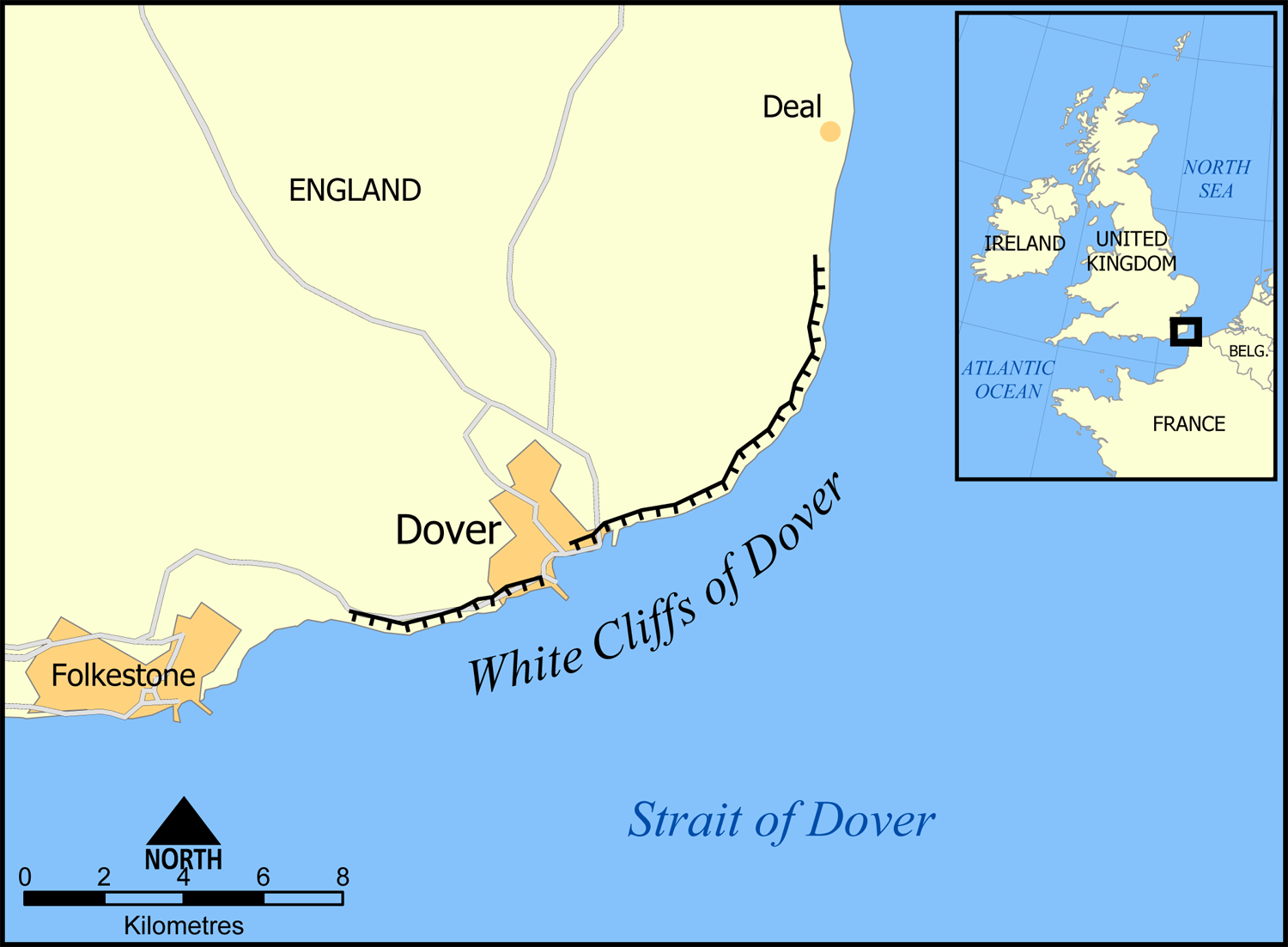
Extent of the White Cliffs of Dover

The cliffs are part of the coastline of Kent in England between approximately 51°06′N 1°14′E and 51°12′N 1°24′E, at the point where Great Britain is closest to continental Europe – the Strait of Dover is approximately 20 miles (32 km) across. On a clear day, the cliffs are visible from the French coast. The chalk cliffs of the Alabaster Coast of Normandy in France are part of the same geological system.

The White Cliffs are at one end of the Kent Downs designated Area of Outstanding Natural Beauty. In 1999 a sustainable National Trust visitor centre was built in the area. The Gateway building, designed by van Heyningen and Haward Architects, houses a restaurant, an information centre on the work of the National Trust, and details of local archaeology, history and landscape.

== Geology ==
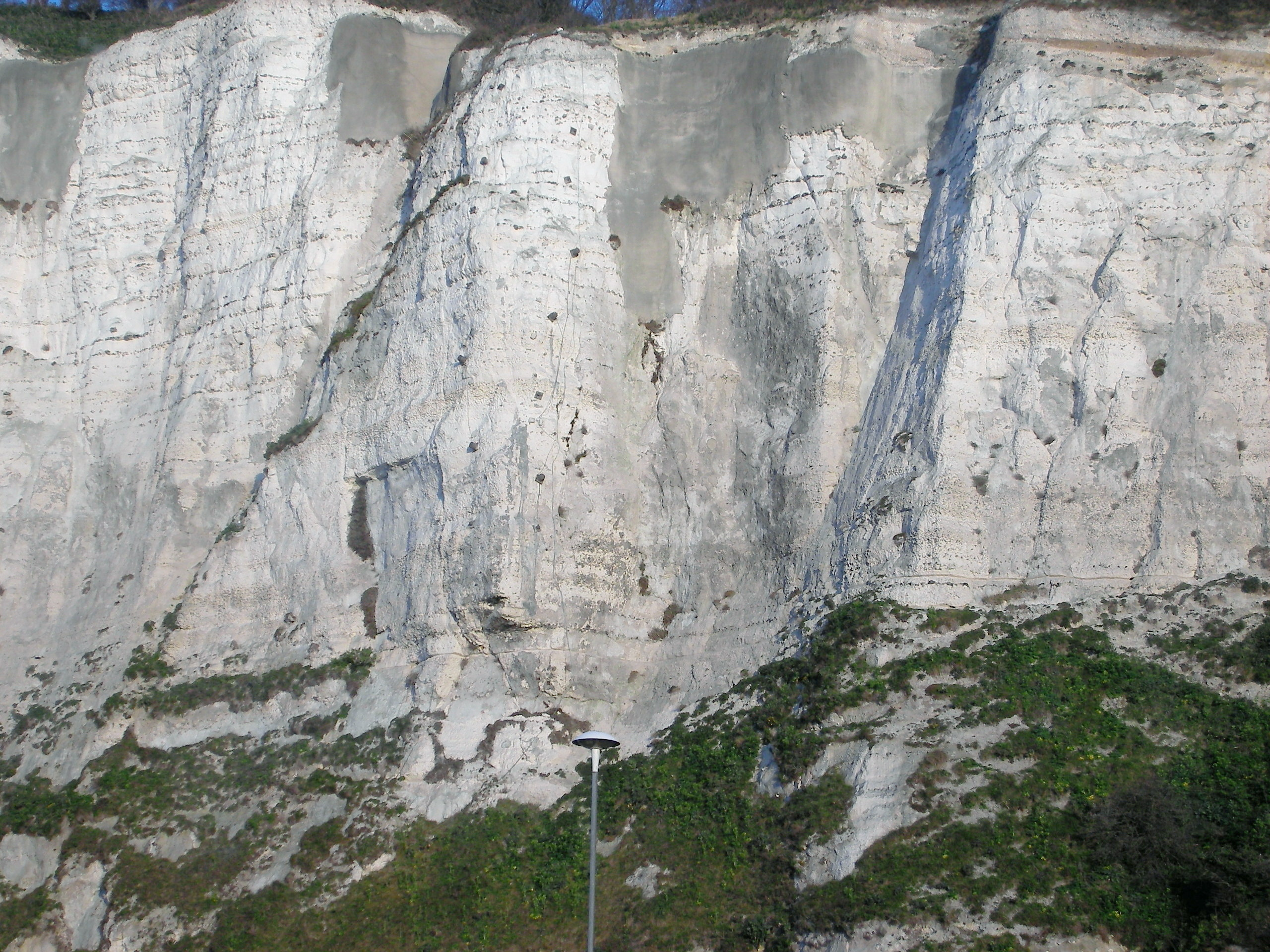
The cliffs' multiple layers of flint match those seen across the channel at Cap Gris Nez, France, evidence of a land connection between England and France in prehistoric times.

During the Late Cretaceous, between 100 million and 66 million years ago, Great Britain and much of Europe were submerged under a great sea. The sea bottom was covered with white mud formed from fragments of coccoliths, the skeletons of tiny algae that floated in the surface waters and sank to the bottom and, together with the remains of bottom-living creatures, formed muddy sediments. It is thought that the sediments were deposited very slowly, probably half a millimetre a year, equivalent to about 180 coccoliths piled one on top of another. Up to 500 metres (1,600 ft) of sediments were deposited in some areas. The weight of overlying sediments caused the deposits to become consolidated into chalk. British chalk deposits are considered stratigraphically to belong in the Chalk Group.

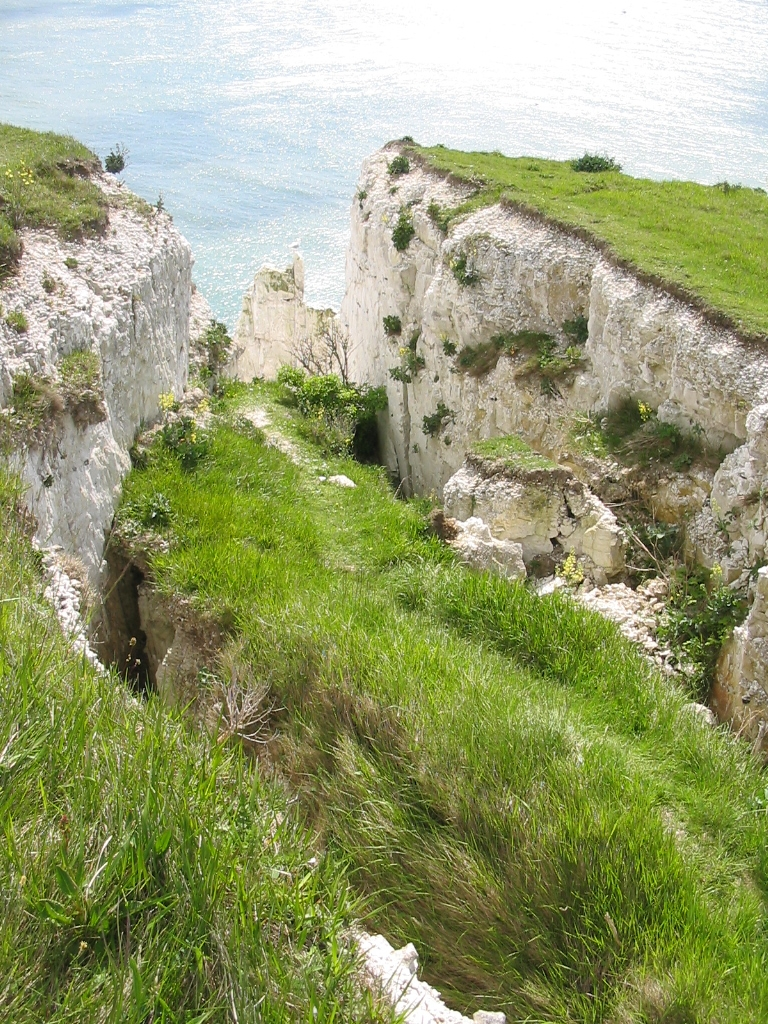
Evidence of erosion along the cliff top

Due to the Alpine orogeny, a major mountain building event during the Cenozoic, the sea-floor deposits were raised above sea level. Until the end of the last glacial period, the British Isles were part of continental Europe, linked by the unbroken Weald-Artois Anticline, a ridge that acted as a natural dam to hold back a large freshwater pro-glacial lake, now submerged under the North Sea. The land masses remained connected until between 450,000 and 180,000 years ago when at least two catastrophic glacial lake outburst floods breached the anticline and destroyed the ridge that connected Britain to Europe. A land connection across the southern North Sea existed intermittently at later times when periods of glaciation resulted in lower sea levels. At the end of the last glacial period, around 10,000 years ago, rising sea levels finally severed the last land connection.

The cliffs' chalk face shows horizontal bands of dark-coloured flint which is composed of the remains of sea sponges and siliceous planktonic micro-organisms that hardened into the microscopic quartz crystals. Quartz silica filled cavities left by dead marine creatures which are found as flint fossils, especially the internal moulds of Micraster echinoids. Several different ocean floor species such as brachiopods, bivalves, crinoids, and sponges can be found in the chalk deposits, as can sharks' teeth.

In some areas, layers of soft, grey chalk known as a hardground complex can be seen. Hardgrounds are thought to reflect disruptions in the steady accumulation of sediment when sedimentation ceased and/or the loose surface sediments were stripped away by currents or slumping, exposing the older hardened chalk sediment. A single hardground may have been exhumed 16 or more times before the sediments were compacted and hardened (lithified) to form chalk.

=== Cliff erosion and change ===
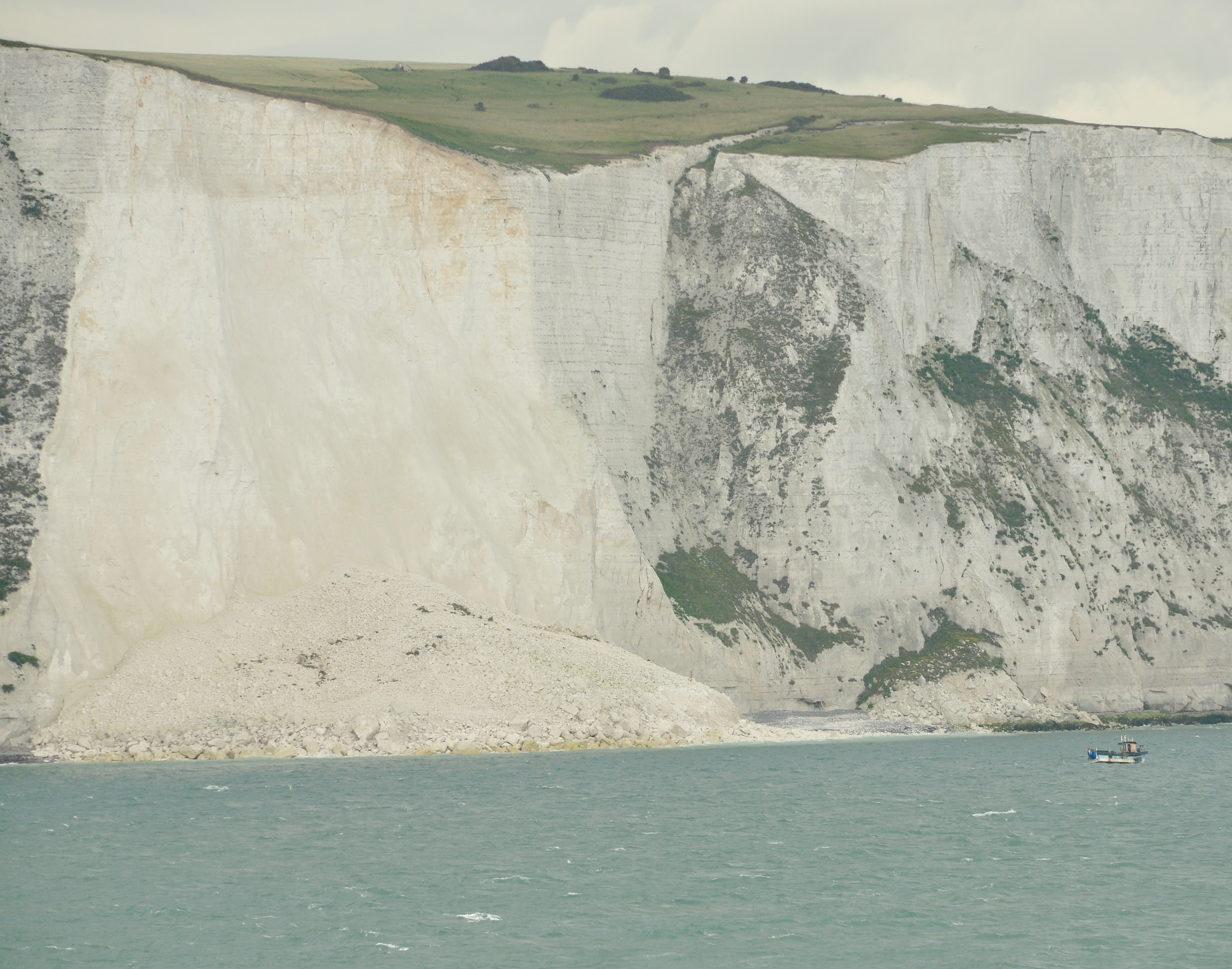
Landslide near Dover Harbour, June 2012

Thousands of years ago, the cliffs were eroding at 20–60 mm (0.75–2.3 in) a year. Research shows that the erosion rate over the last 150 years has increased to 220–320 mm (8.7–12.6 in) a year, and that the erosion is caused by the loss of beach underneath the cliffs exacerbated by stronger storms and human activity such as gravel extraction. Despite this, the cliffs are expected to survive for tens of thousands of years more.

In 2001, a large chunk of the cliff edge, as large as a football pitch, fell into the Channel. Further large sections collapsed on 15 March 2012, 4 February 2020, and on 3 February 2021.

== Ecology ==
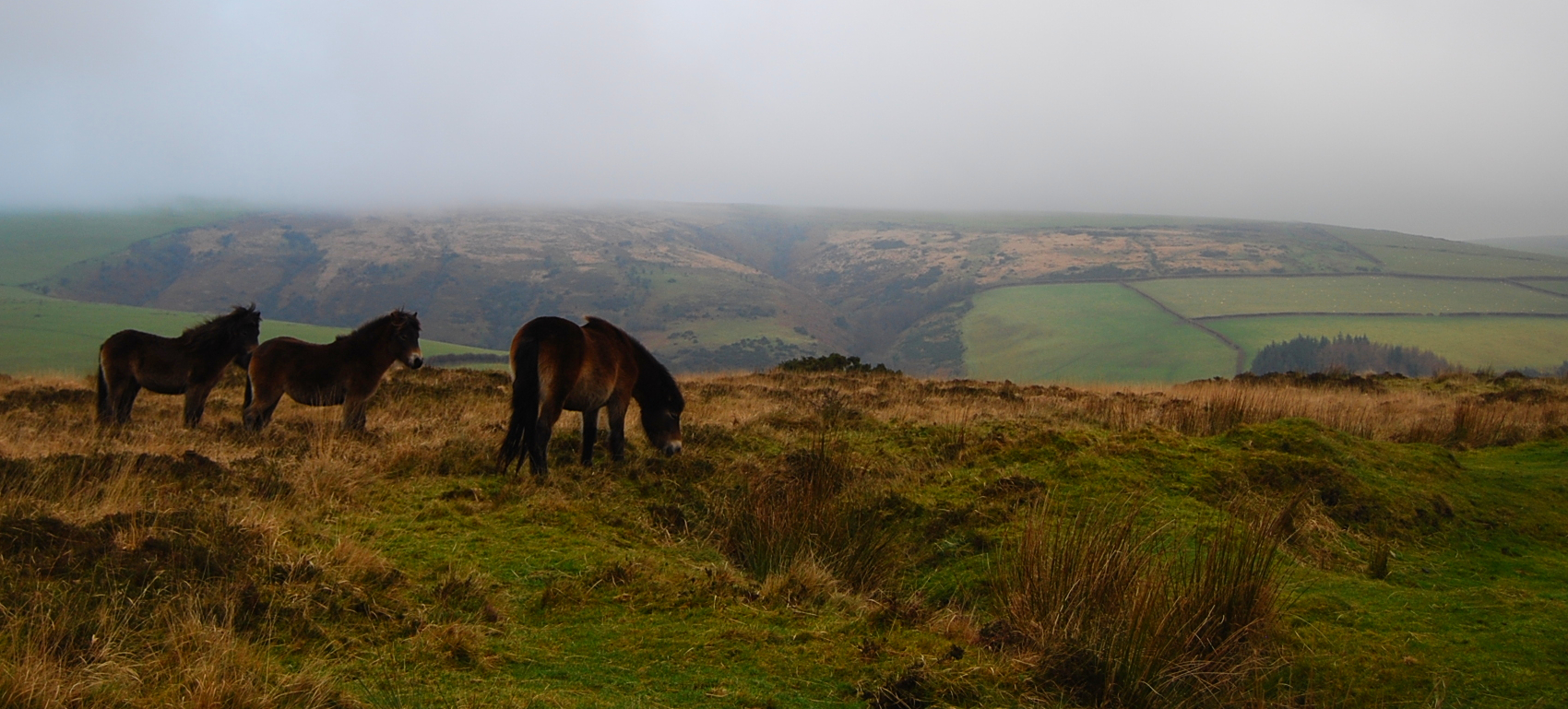
Exmoor ponies in their native habitat

The chalk grassland environment above the cliffs is excellent for many species of wild flowers, butterflies and birds, and has been designated a Special Area of Conservation and a Site of Special Scientific Interest. Rangers and volunteers work to clear invasive plants that threaten the native flora. A grazing programme involving Exmoor ponies has been established to help to clear faster-growing invasive plants, allowing smaller, less robust native plants to survive. The ponies are managed by the National Trust, Natural England, and County Wildlife Trusts to maintain vegetation on nature reserves.

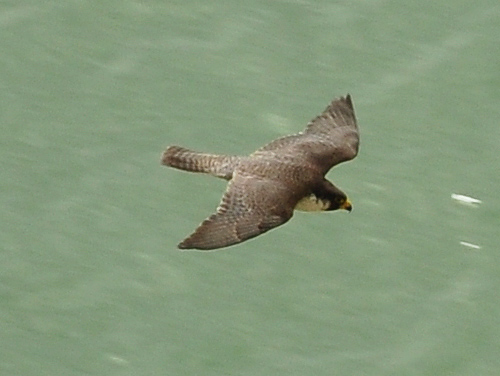
Peregrine falcon off the cliffs

The cliffs are the first landing point for many migratory birds flying inland from across the English Channel. After a 120-year absence, in 2009 it was reported that ravens had returned to the cliffs. Similar in appearance but smaller, the jackdaw is abundant. The rarest of the birds that live along the cliffs is the peregrine falcon. In recent decline, the skylark also makes its home on the cliffs. The cliffs are home to fulmars and to colonies of black-legged kittiwake, a species of gull. Since bluebirds are not indigenous to the UK, some believe that bluebirds, as mentioned in the classic World War II song "(There'll Be Bluebirds Over) The White Cliffs of Dover", composed by American artists, may actually refer to swallows and/or to house martins, which make an annual migration to continental Europe, many of them crossing the English Channel at least twice a year.

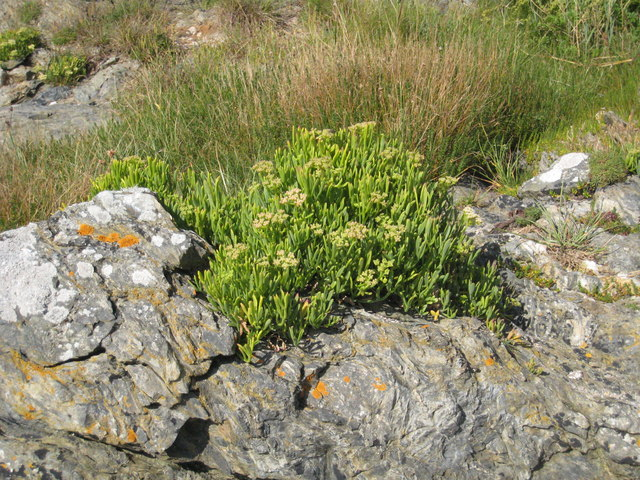
Rock samphire (Crithmum maritimum)

Among the wildflowers are several varieties of orchids, the rarest of which is the early spider orchid, which has yellow-green to brownish green petals and looks like the body of a large spider. Rock samphire is an edible, salt tolerant succulent plant that grows on the cliff's slopes. The oxtongue broomrape is an unusual plant that lives on the roots of a host plant. It has yellow, white, or blue snapdragon-like flowers and about 90 per cent of the UK's population is found on the cliffs. Viper's-bugloss, a showy plant in vivid shades of blue and purple with red stamens, also grows along the cliffs.

The abundance of wildflowers provides homes for about thirty species of butterfly. The rare Adonis blue can be seen in spring and again in autumn. Males have vibrant blue wings lined with a white margin, whereas the females are a rich chocolate brown. This species' sole larval food plant is the horseshoe vetch and it has a symbiotic relationship with red or black ants. The eggs are laid singly on very small foodplants growing in short turf. This provides a warm microclimate, suitable for larval development, which is also favoured by ants. The caterpillar has green and yellow stripes to provide camouflage while it feeds on vetch. The ants milk the sugary secretions from the larval "honey glands" and, in return, protect the larvae from predators and parasitoids, even going so far as to bury them at night. The larvae pupate in the upper soil, and continue to be protected by the ants, often in their nests, until the adults emerge in the spring or autumn.

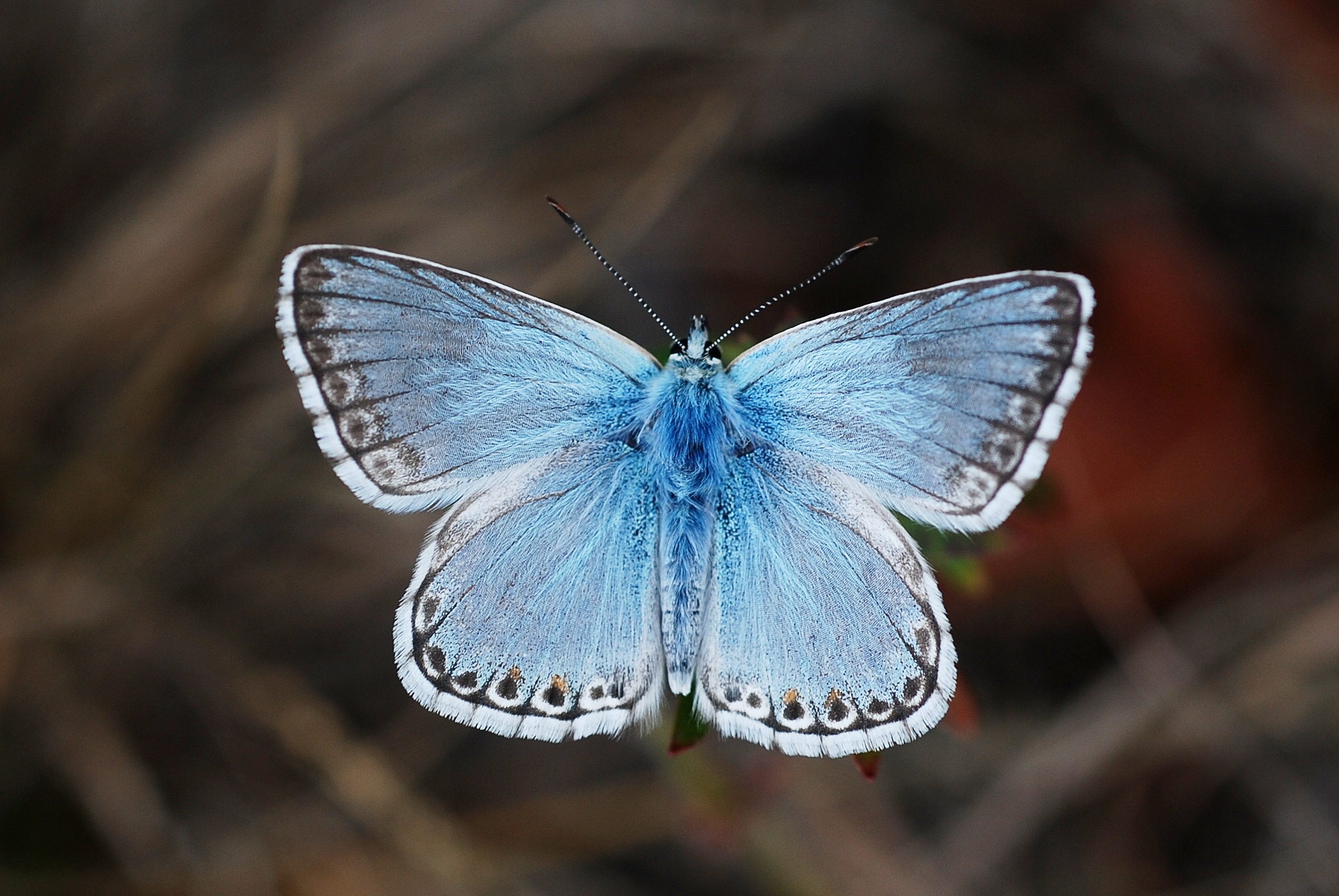
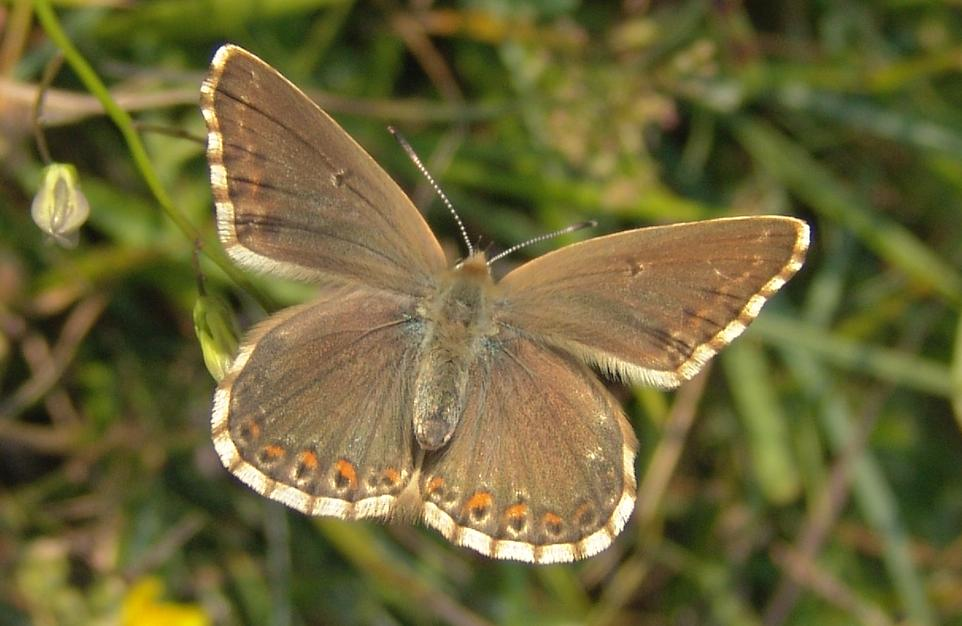
Chalkhill blue; male on left, female on right

Similar in appearance, but more abundant, is the chalkhill blue, a chalk grassland specialist that can be seen in July and August. Threatened species include the silver-spotted skipper and straw belle. The well-known red admiral can be seen from February until November. The marbled white, black and white with a white wing border, can be seen from June to August.

== History ==
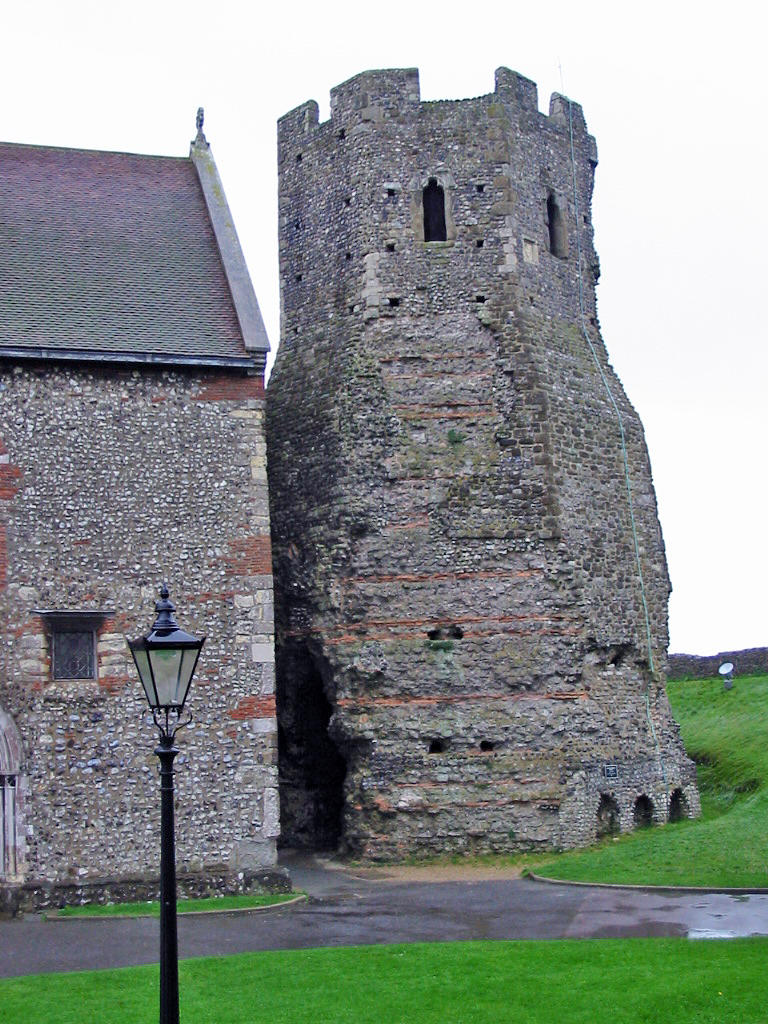
The Roman lighthouse at Dover Castle

In 55 BC, in the earliest recorded mention of the cliffs, Julius Caesar described them in his "Commentarii de Bello Gallico" as rising steeply from the sea and defended by armed Britons, preventing his forces from landing. A possible Iron Age hillfort has been discovered at Dover, on the site of the later castle. The area was also inhabited during the Roman period when Dover was used as a port. A lighthouse survives from this era, one of a pair at Dover which helped shipping navigate the port. It is likely the area around the surviving lighthouse was inhabited in the early medieval period as archaeologists have found a Saxon cemetery here, and the church of St Mary in Castro was built next to the lighthouse in the 10th or 11th century.

It is thought that the name Albion, an ancient or poetic term referring to Great Britain, was derived from the Latin albus (meaning 'white') as an allusion to the white cliffs.

=== Dover Castle ===
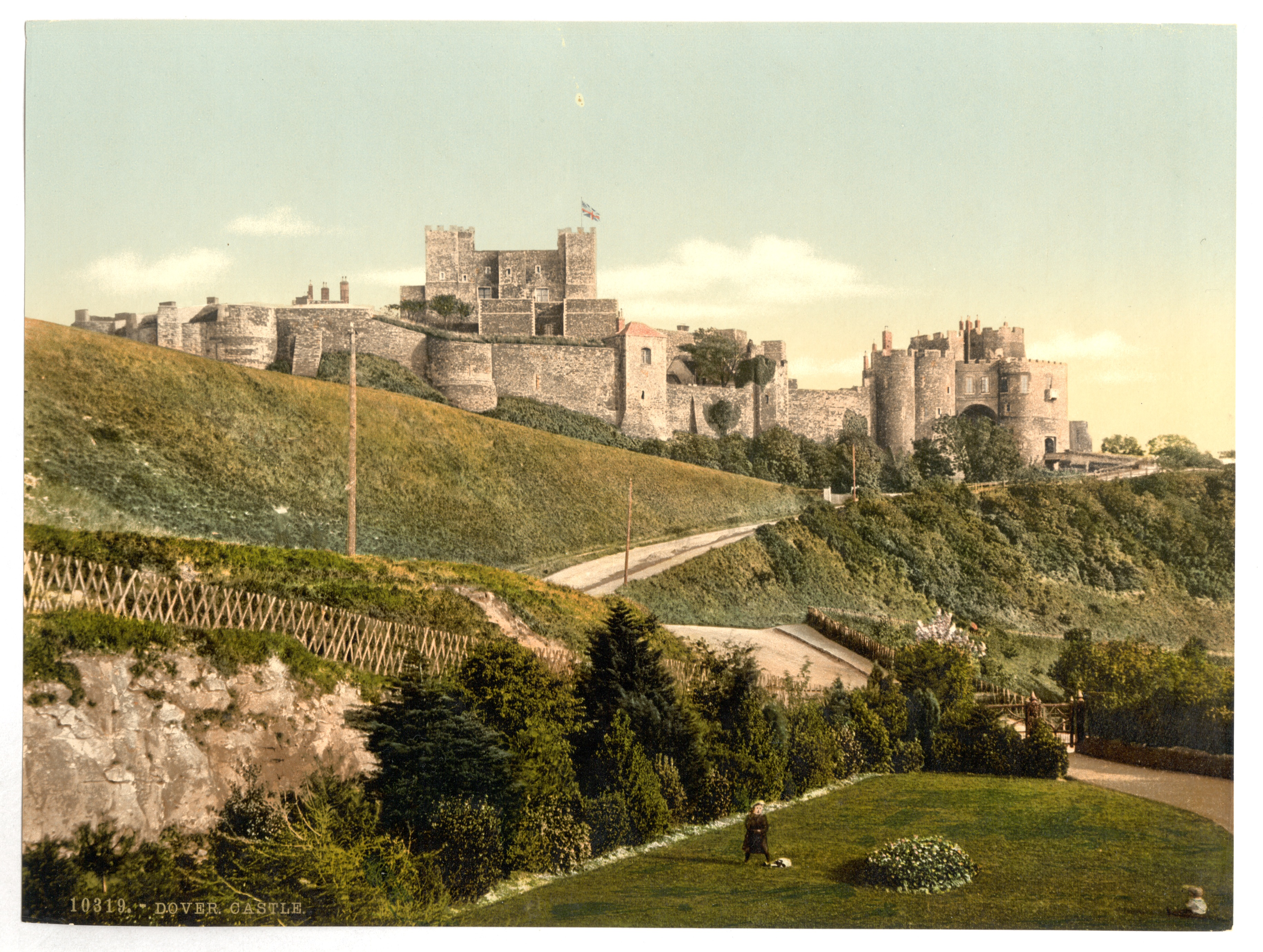
Dover Castle — c. 1890 to 1900

Dover Castle, the largest castle in England, was founded in the 11th century. It has been described as the "Key to England" owing to its defensive significance throughout history. The castle was founded by William the Conqueror in 1066 and rebuilt for Henry II, King John, and Henry III. This expanded the castle to its current size, taking its curtain walls to the edge of the cliffs. During the First Barons' War the castle was held by King John's soldiers and besieged by the French between May 1216 and May 1217. The castle was also besieged in 1265 during the Second Barons' War. In the 16th century, cannons were installed at the castle, but it became less important militarily as Henry VIII had built artillery forts along the coast. Dover Castle was captured in 1642 during the Civil War when the townspeople climbed the cliffs and surprised the royalist garrison, giving a symbolic victory against royal control. Towards the end of the war many castles were slighted, but Dover was spared.

The castle had renewed importance in the 1740s as the development of heavy artillery made capturing ports an important part of warfare. During the Napoleonic Wars, in particular, the defences were remodelled and a series of tunnels were dug into the cliff to act as barracks, adding space for an extra 2,000 soldiers. The tunnels mostly lay abandoned until the Second World War.

=== South Foreland Lighthouse ===
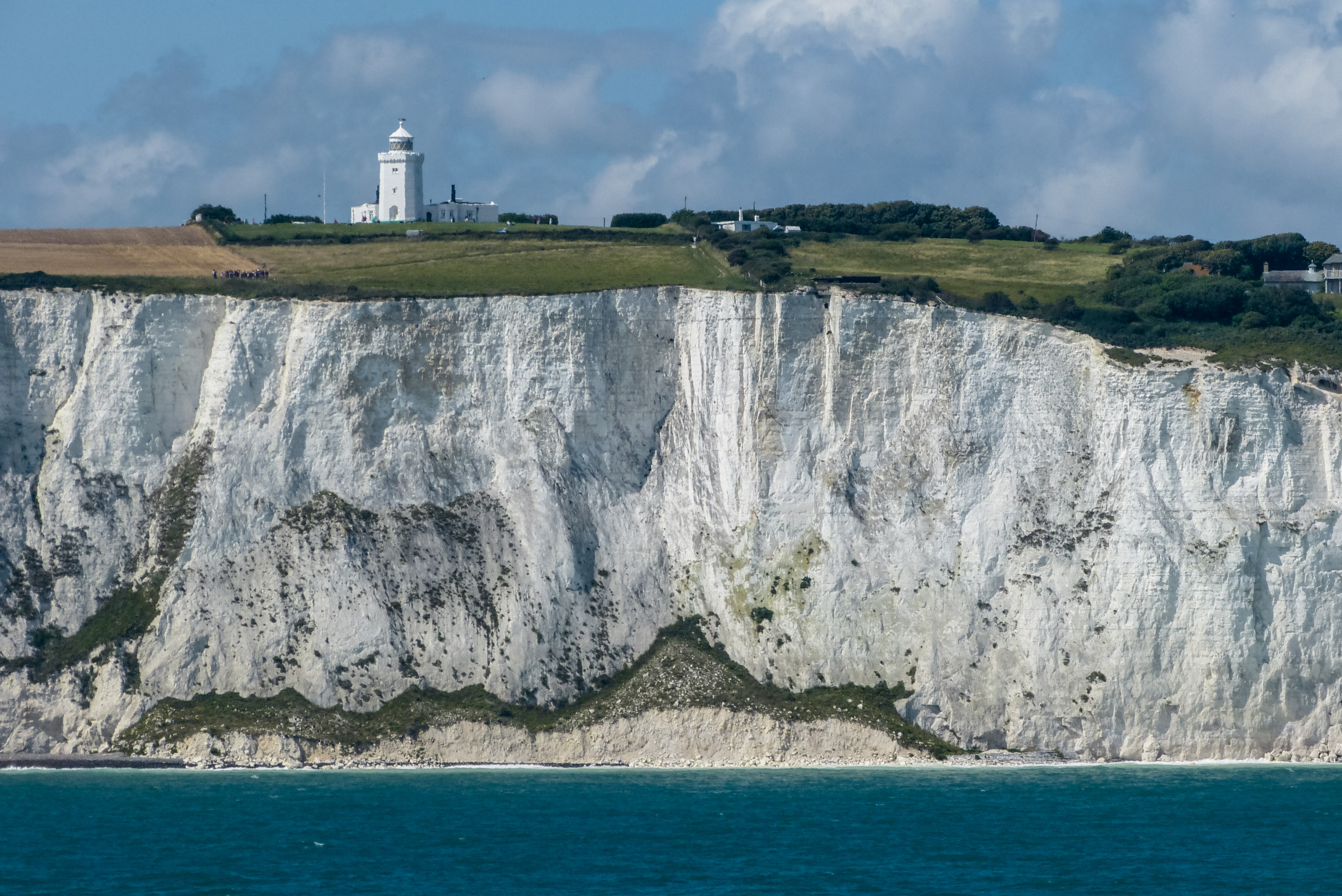
South Foreland lighthouse

South Foreland Lighthouse is a Victorian-era lighthouse on the South Foreland in St. Margaret's Bay, which was once used to warn ships approaching the nearby Goodwin Sands. Goodwin Sands is a 10-mile-long (16 km) sandbank at the southern end of the North Sea lying six miles (10 km) off the Deal coast. The area consists of a layer of fine sand approximately 82 ft (25 m) deep resting on a chalk platform belonging to the same geological feature that incorporates the White Cliffs of Dover. More than 2,000 ships are believed to have been wrecked on the Goodwin Sands because they lie close to the major shipping lanes through the Straits of Dover. It went out of service in 1988 and is now owned by the National Trust for Places of Historic Interest or Natural Beauty.

=== Second World War ===
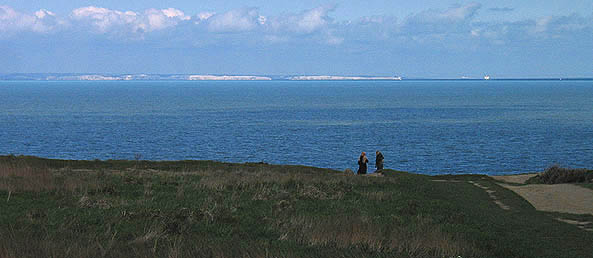
White Cliffs of Dover, seen from France

The cliffs have great symbolic value in Britain because they face towards continental Europe across the narrowest part of the English Channel (approximately 20 miles (32 km) between coasts), where invasions have historically threatened and against which the cliffs form a symbolic guard. The National Trust calls the cliffs "an icon of Britain", with "the white chalk face a symbol of home and wartime defence." Because crossing at Dover was the primary route to the continent before the advent of air travel, the white line of cliffs also formed the first or last sight of Britain for travellers. During the Second World War, thousands of allied troops on the little ships in the Dunkirk evacuation saw the welcoming sight of the cliffs. In the summer of 1940, reporters gathered at Shakespeare Cliff to watch aerial dogfights between German and British aircraft during the Battle of Britain.

Vera Lynn, known as "The Forces' Sweetheart" for her 1942 wartime classic "(There'll Be Bluebirds Over) The White Cliffs of Dover" celebrated her 100th birthday in 2017. That year she led a campaign for donations to buy 170 acres (0.7 km^{2}) of land atop Dover's cliffs when it was feared that they might be sold to developers; the campaign met its target after only three weeks. The National Trust, which owns the surrounding areas, plans to return the land to a natural state of chalk grassland and preserve existing military structures from the Second World War. In June 2021, a wildflower meadow on White Cliffs of Dover was named in honour of Dame Vera Lynn.

=== Post-war ===
The cliffs have featured on commemorative postage stamps issued by the Royal Mail, including in their British coastline series in 2002 and UK A-Z series in 2012. A section of coastline encompassing the cliffs was purchased by the National Trust in 2016.

== Attractions ==
=== Dover Museum ===
Dover Museum was founded in 1836. Shelled from France in 1942 during the Second World War, the museum lost much of its collections, including nearly all its natural history collections. Much of the surviving material was left neglected in caves and other stores until 1946. In 1948 a temporary museum was opened and in 1991 a new museum of three storeys, built behind its original Victorian façade, was opened. In 1999, a new gallery on the second floor centred on the Dover Bronze Age Boat was opened.

=== Samphire Hoe Country Park ===
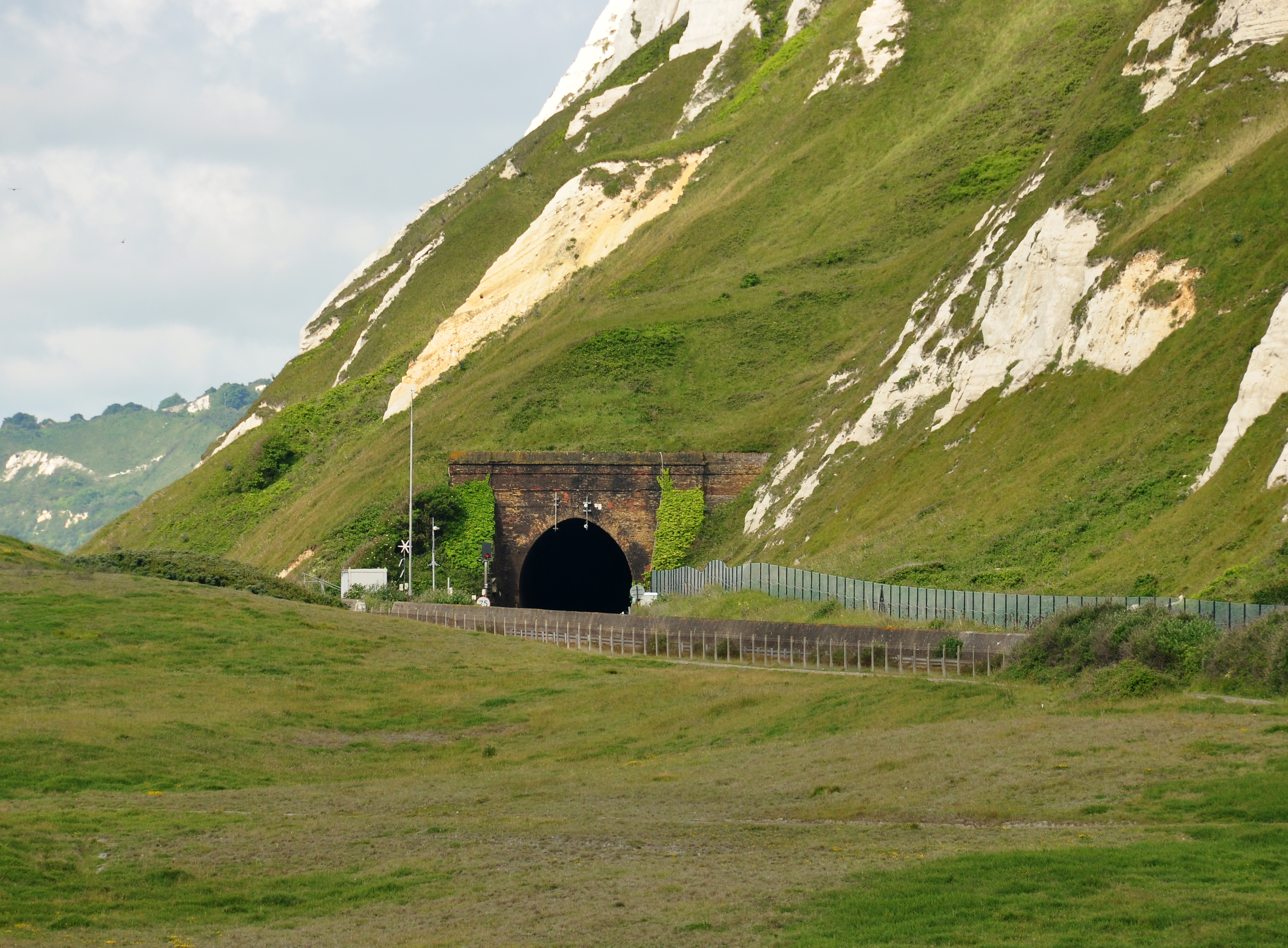
Samphire Hoe Country Park with local railway and tunnel (not the Channel Tunnel which is nearby)

Samphire Hoe Country Park is a nature reserve on a new piece of land created from the rock excavated during the construction of the Channel Tunnel. It covers a 74-acre (30 ha) site at the foot of Shakespeare Cliff, between Dover and Folkestone. There is an education shelter with a classroom and exhibition area. Staff and volunteers are available to answer questions and provide information about the wildlife in the reserve. The building's design incorporates eco-construction criteria. The nature reserve is named after the edible plant rock samphire, which grows on the cliffs and used to be gathered by hanging ropes over the cliff's edge. Shakespeare mentions rock samphire in his play King Lear and includes a reference to this trade with the lines "Half-way down / Hangs one that gathers samphire; dreadful trade!" (Act IV, Scene VI Lines 14–15). This refers to the dangers involved in collecting rock samphire on sea cliffs. Shakespeare Cliff was named after the reference to this "dreadful trade".

=== Fan Bay Deep Shelter ===
Fan Bay Deep Shelter is a series of tunnels constructed during World War II. The tunnels were opened to the public on 20 July 2015.

== In song and literature ==
- One of the most famous references in English literature to the White Cliffs is in Shakespeare's King Lear. In Act IV, Scene VI, Edgar persuades the blinded Earl of Gloucester that he is at the edge of a cliff at Dover. In Act IV, Scene I, Lines 76–8, Gloucester says, "There is a cliff, whose high and bending head looks fearfully in the confinèd deep: Bring me but to the very brim of it." Edgar then fools Gloucester into thinking he is at the cliff’s edge and describes the scene: "Here's the place! – stand still – how fearful/ And dizzy 'tis, to cast one's eye so low ... halfway down/Hangs one that gathers samphire: dreadful trade!/Methinks he seems no bigger than his head." (Act IV, Scene VI, Lines 11–16).
- In 1851, English poet Matthew Arnold began his lyric poem "Dover Beach" by epitomizing the beauty of the Kent coast:

"The sea is calm tonight.
The tide is full, the moon lies fair
Upon the straits; on the French coast the light
Gleams and is gone; the cliffs of England stand,
Glimmering and vast, out in the tranquil bay."

- The verse novel The White Cliffs by Alice Duer Miller encouraged U.S. entry into World War II. The poem was extremely successful on both sides of the Atlantic, selling nearly one million copies – an unusual number for a book of verse. It was broadcast and recorded by British-American actress Lynn Fontanne (with a symphonic accompaniment), and the story was made into the 1944 film The White Cliffs of Dover.
- Jimmy Cliff wrote and recorded the song "Many Rivers to Cross" in 1969. The song included the line "Wandering I am lost, as I travel along the White Cliffs of Dover."
- The 1941 song "(There'll Be Bluebirds Over) The White Cliffs of Dover" is a popular World War II song composed by Walter Kent to lyrics by Nat Burton. It was made famous by Vera Lynn's 1942 version.
- The White Cliffs have long been a landmark for sailors. It is noted as such in the sea shanty "Spanish Ladies":

"The first land we sighted was called the Dodman,
Next Rame Head off Plymouth, off Portsmouth the Wight;
We sailed by Beachy, by Fairlight and Dover,
And then we bore up for the South Foreland light.

- The song "Calais to Dover" by Bright Eyes from the 2020 album Down In The Weeds Where The World Once Was refers to the cliffs most likely via Shakespeare or Matthew Arnold: "Threw up on the ferry ride from Calais back to Dover/As pale as the white cliffs that we faced/Wasn't afraid, eventualities, just knew that it was over/No brushes with death could keep us sober."
- American guitarist Eric Johnson released a guitar instrumental, "Cliffs of Dover", in 1990 as part of his album Ah Via Musicom. "Cliffs of Dover" was voted number 17 in Guitar World's list of 100 Greatest Guitar Solos and won a Grammy Award for Best Rock Instrumental Performance in 1992.
- The Decemberists's song "We Both Go Down Together" opens with a couple standing on the cliffs, presumably about to jump: "Here on these cliffs of Dover/So high you can't see over/And while your head is spinning/Hold tight, it's just beginning." The song appears on their 2005 album Picaresque and tells the story of either a joint suicide or a murder-suicide; the unreliable narrator is a "sociopath", according to the song's writer, Colin Meloy.
- On a Piece of Chalk was a lecture by Thomas Henry Huxley presented to the British Association for the Advancement of Science in 1868 and published later that year. The piece reconstructs the geological history of Great Britain from a simple piece of chalk and demonstrates science as "organized common sense".
- "Ostia (The Death of Pasolini)" by (Coil) mentions the location in its 6th verse.

== Gallery ==
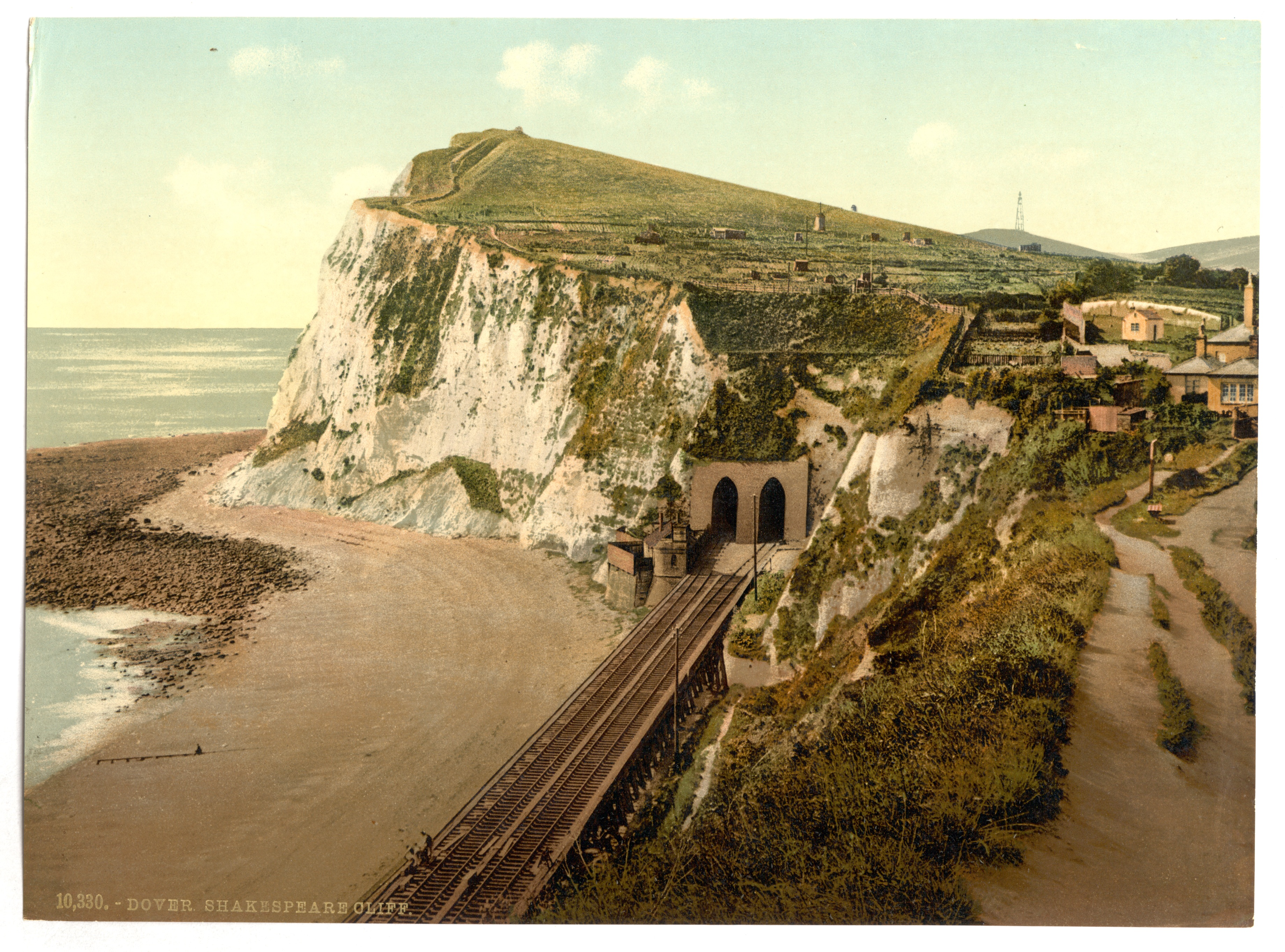
Shakespeare Cliff, Dover c. 1905

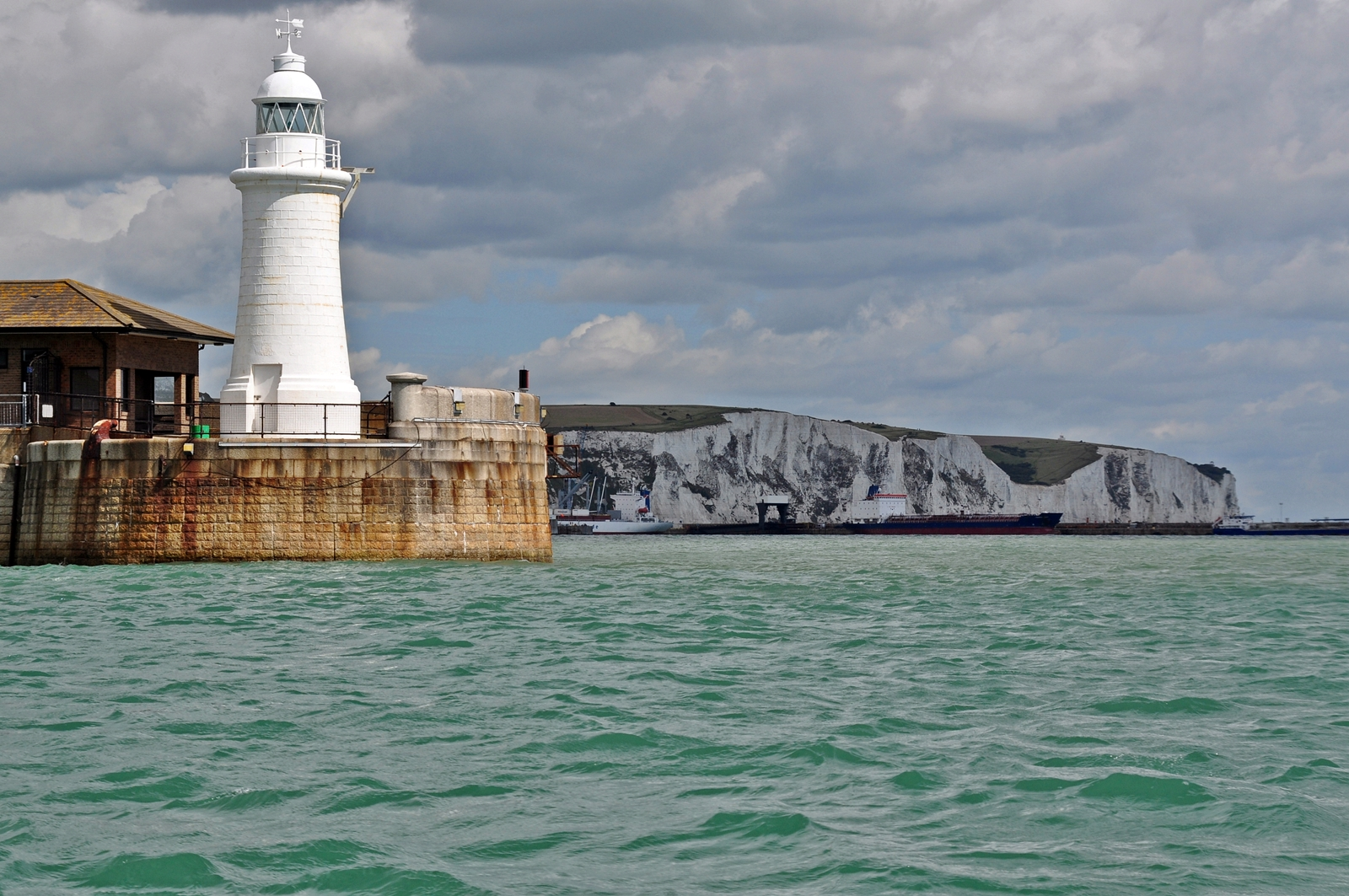
Lighthouse in Dover

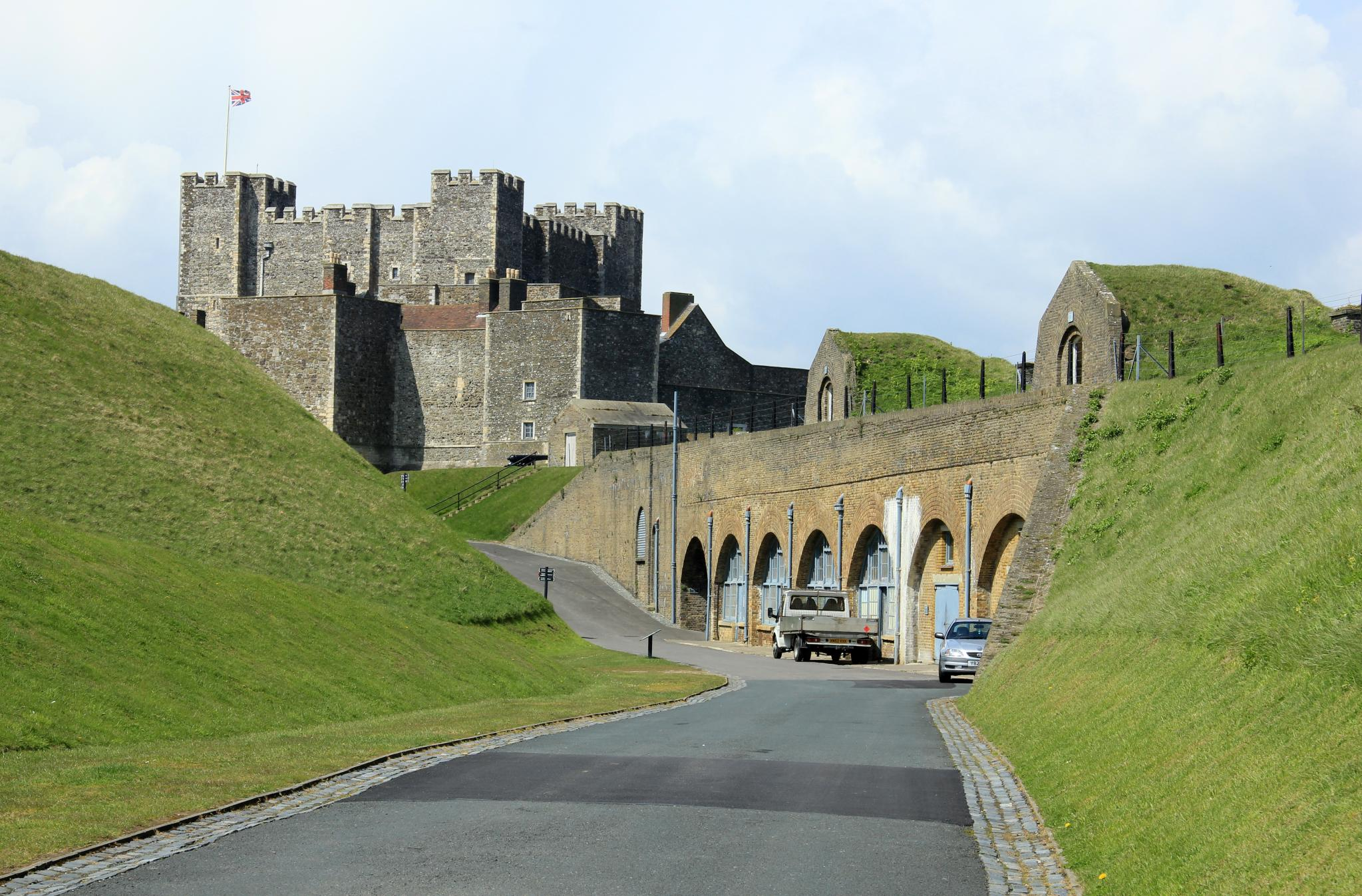
Dover Castle

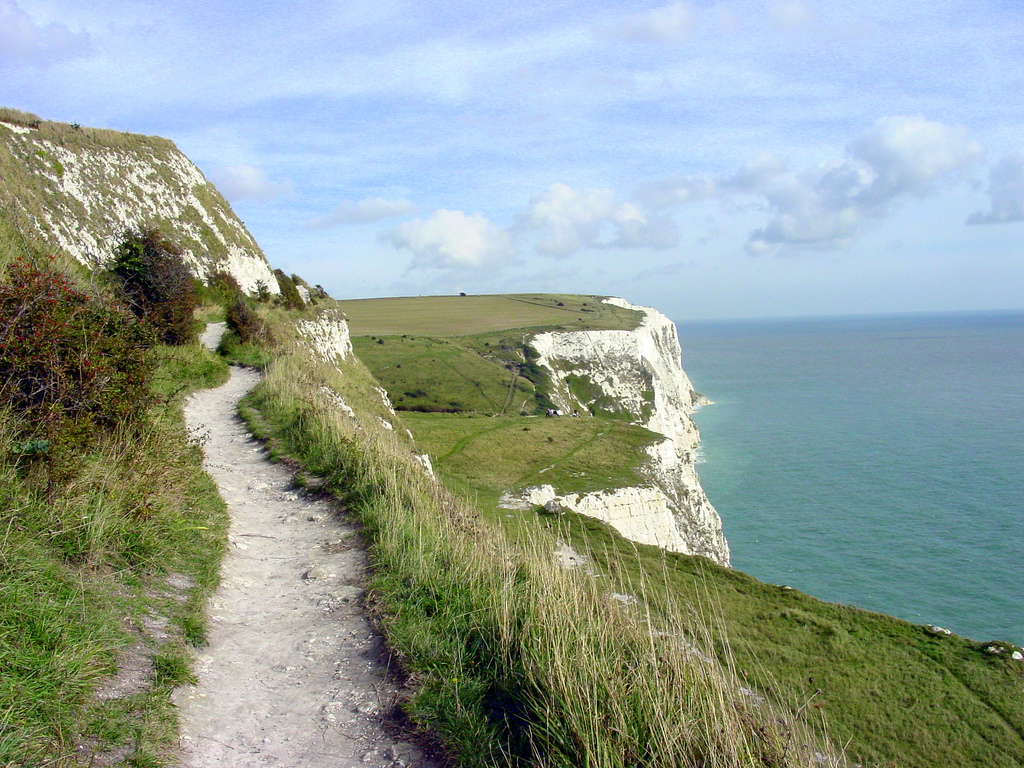
White Cliffs of Dover footpath

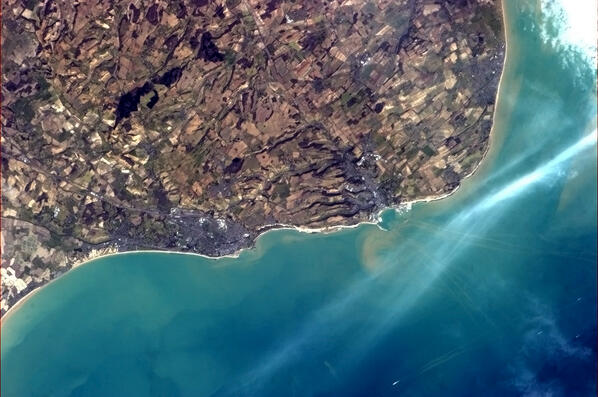
Folkestone and Dover from the International Space Station, showing the White Cliffs and the tracks of ferries

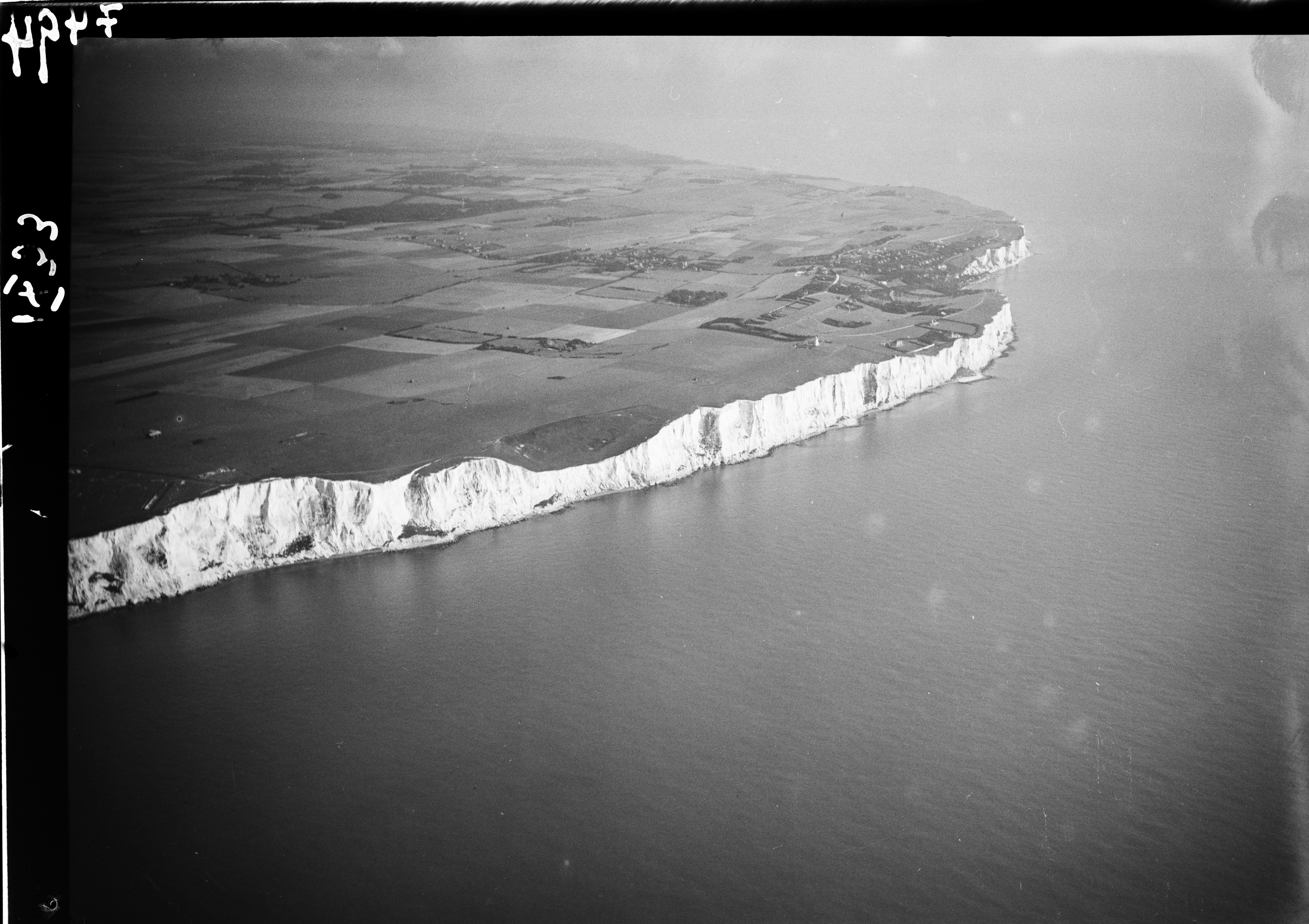
Vintage photo taken by Walter Mittelholzer, Swiss photographer and aviator, 1933

== See also ==
- Albion, a name for Britain possibly derived from the colour of the cliffs
- Beachy Head
- Kap Arkona
- Møns Klint
- Seaford Head Nature Reserve
- Seven Sisters, Sussex
- Shakespeare Cliff Halt railway station
- South Downs
