= Dover to Kingsdown Cliffs =

Protected area in Kent, England

Coordinates: 51.146°N 1.371°E

- Site of Special Scientific Interest
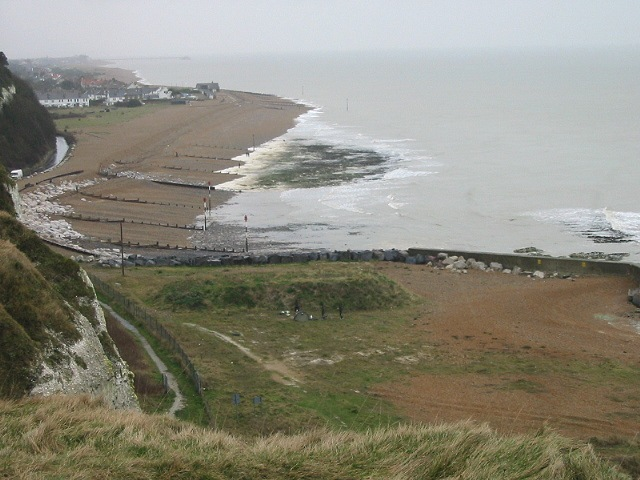
- Location of Dover to Kingsdown Cliffs.
- Area of search: Kent
- Grid reference: TR 359 439
- Interest: Biological; Geological
- Area: 207.7 hectares (513 acres)
- Notification date: 1987
- Location map: Magic Map

Dover to Kingsdown Cliffs is a 207.7-hectare (513-acre) biological and geological Site of Special Scientific Interest which runs along the Kent coast between Dover and Kingsdown. It is a Geological Conservation Review site and a Special Area of Conservation, and part of it is The White Cliffs of Dover, owned by the National Trust.

The cliffs have fossiliferous rocks dating to the Cretaceous between 99 and 86 million years ago, and they are historically important as many geological principles were tested there. The cliffs have many breeding sea birds, and there are diverse algae on the foreshore.

A public footpath runs through the site.
