= Picaresque (album) =

Studio album by the Decemberists
- Released: March 22, 2005 (US)
- Recorded: August–September 2004
- Genres: Indie rock; folk rock; baroque pop
- Length: 53:07
- Label: Kill Rock Stars
- Producers: The Decemberists, Chris Walla

The Decemberists chronology
The Tain (2004)	Picaresque (2005)	Picaresqueties (2005)

Singles from Picaresque
- 1. "Sixteen Military Wives" Released: November 21, 2005

Picaresque is the third studio album from the Decemberists. It was released in 2005 on the Kill Rock Stars record label. The word "picaresque" refers to a form of satirical prose originating in Spain, depicting realistically and often humorously the adventures of a low-born, roguish hero living by their wits in a corrupt society.

== Recording ==
The album was recorded at the Prescott Church in northeast Portland, which the band rented for one month in the summer of 2004. To facilitate the creative process and avoid creative block, band members filled a used bike helmet with slips of paper listing strategies and ideas to try out. Non-traditional rock instruments used in the album's recording included an accordion and a hurdy-gurdy. The album was produced by Chris Walla, also the guitarist for the band Death Cab for Cutie.

== Release ==
The album includes the track "Sixteen Military Wives", the music video of which was distributed by the band via BitTorrent. A double vinyl version was released in the United States that contained the album on the first three sides with an EP of outtakes named Picaresqueties on the fourth side. This EP was the band's final release for the Kill Rock Stars label. In Europe, a single-disc vinyl version was released on Rough Trade without the Picaresqueties EP; the first six tracks appear on Side A, and the final five are on Side B.

A limited edition tenth anniversary pressing of the album on red vinyl was released for Record Store Day 2015. It was formatted as three sides, with the tracks from the Picaresqueties EP as the fourth side.

As of September 2006 it has sold 123,000 units in United States.

== Reception ==
Professional ratings
Aggregate scores
Source	Rating
Metacritic	81/100
Review scores
Source	Rating
AllMusic	4/5 stars
Alternative Press	5/5
Blender	4/5 stars
Entertainment Weekly	A−
The Guardian	5/5 stars
Houston Chronicle	4/5 stars
NME	4/10
Pitchfork	8.3/10
Rolling Stone	3.5/5 stars
Spin	B+

Picaresque has a rating of 81/100 on Metacritic, indicating "universal acclaim". The album reached number 5 on the Billboard Heatseekers chart, and number 128 on the Billboard 200. Pitchfork placed Picaresque at number 143 on their list of top 200 albums of the 2000s.

== Track listing ==
All songs written by Colin Meloy.

No.	Title	Length
1.	"The Infanta"	5:08
2.	"We Both Go Down Together"	3:04
3.	"Eli, the Barrow Boy"	3:11
4.	"The Sporting Life"	4:38
5.	"The Bagman's Gambit"	7:02
6.	"From My Own True Love (Lost at Sea)"	3:42
7.	"Sixteen Military Wives"	4:53
8.	"The Engine Driver"	4:15
9.	"On the Bus Mall"	6:04
10.	"The Mariner's Revenge Song"	8:46
11.	"Of Angels and Angles"	2:28
Total length:		53:07

== Personnel ==
The Decemberists

- Colin Meloy – lead vocals, rhythm guitar
- Chris Funk – lead guitar, steel guitar, backing vocals
- Jenny Conlee – keyboards, accordion, backing vocals
- Nate Query – bass, backing vocals
- Rachel Blumberg – drums, backing vocals

Additional musicians

- Petra Haden – violin, backing vocals
- Chris Walla – electric guitar
- Paul Brainard – trumpet
- Tom Hill – trombone
- Joe Cunningham – saxophone
- Aaron Stewart – tam-tam
- Jeff London – shofar
- Eric Stern – operatic tenor

== Uses in media ==
The Mad Men episode "Maidenform" opened with a montage set to a segment of the song "The Infanta".
