= WYCE =

Coordinates: 42.912°N 85.683°W

- Wyoming, Michigan; United States
- Broadcast area: Grand Rapids, Michigan; West Michigan
- Frequency: 88.1 MHz
- Branding: Independent Community Radio for West Michigan

Programming
- Format: Public: Non-commercial Adult Album Alternative

Ownership
- Owner: Grand Rapids Community Media Center

History
- First air date: 1983
- Call sign meaning: WYoming Community Education

Technical information
- Licensing authority: FCC
- Class: B1
- Power: 10,000 watts

Links
- Public license information: Public file; LMS
- Webcast: Listen Live
- Website: grcmc.org/wyce

WYCE (88.1 FM) is an American community radio station, broadcasting a noncommercial, Triple A format. The station's music is programmed by volunteers, drawing from a diverse library of eclectic music, primarily folk, rock, blues, worldbeat and jazz music, with some emphasis on local musicians.

== History ==
It is licensed to Wyoming, Michigan, and began broadcasting in 1983 as an FM-based extension to a cable-based radio station that had been operating since 1978 on (then) GE Cablevision in the Wyoming and Kentwood areas. This station was licensed to Wyoming Community Education (the source of the station's call letters).

In 1987, the Wyoming Board of Education, in response to concerns about the music its students were programming, transferred the license and sold the assets to Grand Rapids Cable Access Center (which operated a Public-access television cable TV channel known as GRTV), which was the forerunner to the Grand Rapids Community Media Center (GRCMC).

For several years, a special committee of the GRCAC board known as the Friends of WYCE provided direction to the station staff and volunteers.

In the mid-1990s, the studios were moved from the community education site in suburban Wyoming, joining other components of the GRCMC as they consolidated in renovated facilities on the second floor of the West Side Library, just west of downtown Grand Rapids.

In the late 1990s the station got a new transmitter and tower, thereby increasing its signal strength and coverage. The tower is located on Woodward Ave SW, just south of 28th Street, in Wyoming, Michigan.

In 2010 the station received clearance from the U.S. Federal Communications Commission to expand its coverage area and power output, and so a new transmitter and antenna were purchased and installed. WYCE serves listeners in much of the West Michigan area including Grand Rapids, Holland and Muskegon.

Previous logo

== Programs ==
WYCE is funded entirely by donations from listeners and local sponsors, and operated by nearly 100 volunteers and a small paid staff. In addition to broadcasting via its FM transmitter, it streams audio over the internet and a mobile app.

WYCE operates 24 hours a day, mostly with musical programming hosted by live presenters. Most shifts feature music from all of the station's standard genres. An early-morning block of programming features a long-standing Spanish-language program featuring Mexican music. On Friday mornings, the station hosts a program that focuses on local/regional music called, "Local Spins." The station also features a small number of prerecorded syndicated programs and community-affairs features.

The station sponsors a variety of concerts and other events within the metropolitan Grand Rapids area. These include free concerts at which voluntary donations are solicited to support local charities. Since 2000, WYCE has presented the annual Jammie Awards, spotlighting local musicians.

== See also ==
- List of community radio stations in the United States
