= Laura Veirs discography =

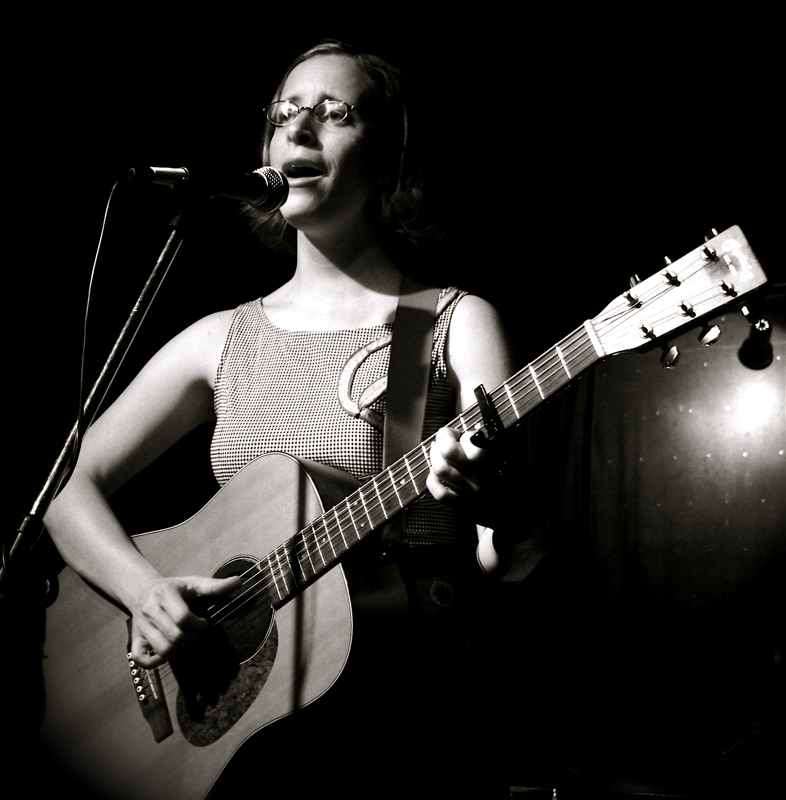
- Studio albums: 14
- Singles: 4
- Music videos: 4
- Other appearances: 10

American rock/folk music singer Laura Veirs has released fourteen studio albums (including one album as part of case/lang/veirs), four singles, an extended plays, a live album and four music videos on Raven Marching Band (United States) and Bella Records (Europe).

Laura Veirs's debut album Laura Veirs, was released in 1999 as an independent album. Following the first album, Laura Veirs had a successful career during the 2000s with the albums The Triumphs and Travails of Orphan Mae in 2001, Troubled by the Fire in 2003, Carbon Glacier in 2004, Year of Meteors in 2005, and Saltbreakers in 2007.

With July Flame (2011) and Warp & Weft (2013), Veirs gained her first international success and chart positions.

== Albums ==
=== Studio albums ===
List of studio albums with selected details and chart positions
Title	Album details	Peak chart positions				
Title	Album details	US	US Folk	US Heat	FRA	UK
Laura Veirs	Released: 1999; Label: Raven Marching Band; Formats: CD	—	—	—	179	—
The Triumphs and Travails of Orphan Mae	Released: July 10, 2001; Label: Raven Marching Band; Formats: CD	—	—	—	—	—
Troubled by the Fire	Released: March 4, 2003; Label: Raven Marching Band; Formats: CD	—	—	—	—	—
Carbon Glacier	Released: August 24, 2004; Label: Raven Marching Band; Formats: CD	—	—	—	—	—
Year of Meteors	Released: August 23, 2005; Label: Raven Marching Band; Formats: CD	—	—	—	135	97
Saltbreakers	Released: March 17, 2007; Label: Raven Marching Band; Formats: CD	—	—	—	—	96
July Flame	Released: January 12, 2010; Label: Raven Marching Band (US) / Bella Union (EU); Formats: CD, DD	124	1	1	—	—
Tumble Bee	Released: November 8, 2011; Label: Raven Marching Band (US) / Bella Union (EU); Formats: CD, DD	—	—	26	—	—
Warp & Weft	Released: August 20, 2013; Label: Raven Marching Band (US) / Bella Union (EU); Formats: CD, DD	—	10	13	—	59
Case/Lang/Veirs (with Neko Case and k.d. lang)	Released: June 17, 2016; Label: Anti-; Formats: CD, DD	33	3	—	—	28
The Lookout	Released: April 13, 2018; Label: Raven Marching Band (US) / Bella Union (EU); Formats: CD, DD, vinyl	—	—	—	—	—
My Echo	Released: October 23, 2020; Label: Raven Marching Band; Formats: CD, DD, vinyl	—	—	—	—	—
Found Light	Released: July 8, 2022; Label: Raven Marching Band; Formats: CD, DD, vinyl	—	—	—	—	—
Phone Orphans	Released: November 3, 2023; Label: Raven Marching Band; Formats: CD, DD, vinyl	—	—	—	—	—
Temple Songs	Released: August 14, 2026; Label: Raven Marching Band; Formats: CD, DD, vinyl	—	—	—	—	—

=== Live albums ===
- Lore of Ears, (Kelp Monthly, 2004)
- Live in Brooklyn (Raven Marching Band Records, 2024)
- Laura Veirs and the Choir Who Couldn't Say (Live in Angouleme) (Raven Marching Band Records, 2025)

=== Soundtracks ===
- Hello I Must Be Going from director Todd Louiso, starring Melanie Lynskey, Christopher Abbott and Blythe Danner, Raven Marching Band Records, September 2012

=== Collaborative albums ===
- case/lang/veirs, with Neko Case and k.d. lang, (Anti-, June 17, 2016)

== EPs ==
- Two Beers Veirs, (Raven Marching Band, 2008)

== Other album appearances ==
- The Young Rapture Choir (Raven Marching Band, 2006)
- "Yankee Bayonet (I Will Be Home Then)" on The Decemberists's The Crane Wife (Capitol, 2006)
- Sailor System by Your Heart Breaks (Don't Stop Believin, 2006)
- "Dear Avery" on The Decemberists's The King Is Dead (Capitol, 2011)

== Compilation tracks ==
- "Black-Eyed Susan" (demo) on Remote Wing, Knw-Yr-Own, 2001
- "The Water's Gone (But Life Is Long)" (with Danny Barnes) on Shipwreck Day, Knw-Yr-Own, 2002
- "17" on Flotsam and Jetsam: 2005 What the Heck Fest Sampler, Kelp Monthly, 2005
- "Cast a Hook in Me" on The Sound the Hare Heard, Kill Rock Stars, 2006
- An exclusive version of "Nightingale" on Paste Magazine Sampler 39, 2007
