= Steven Nistor =

American touring and studio drummer (born 1979)

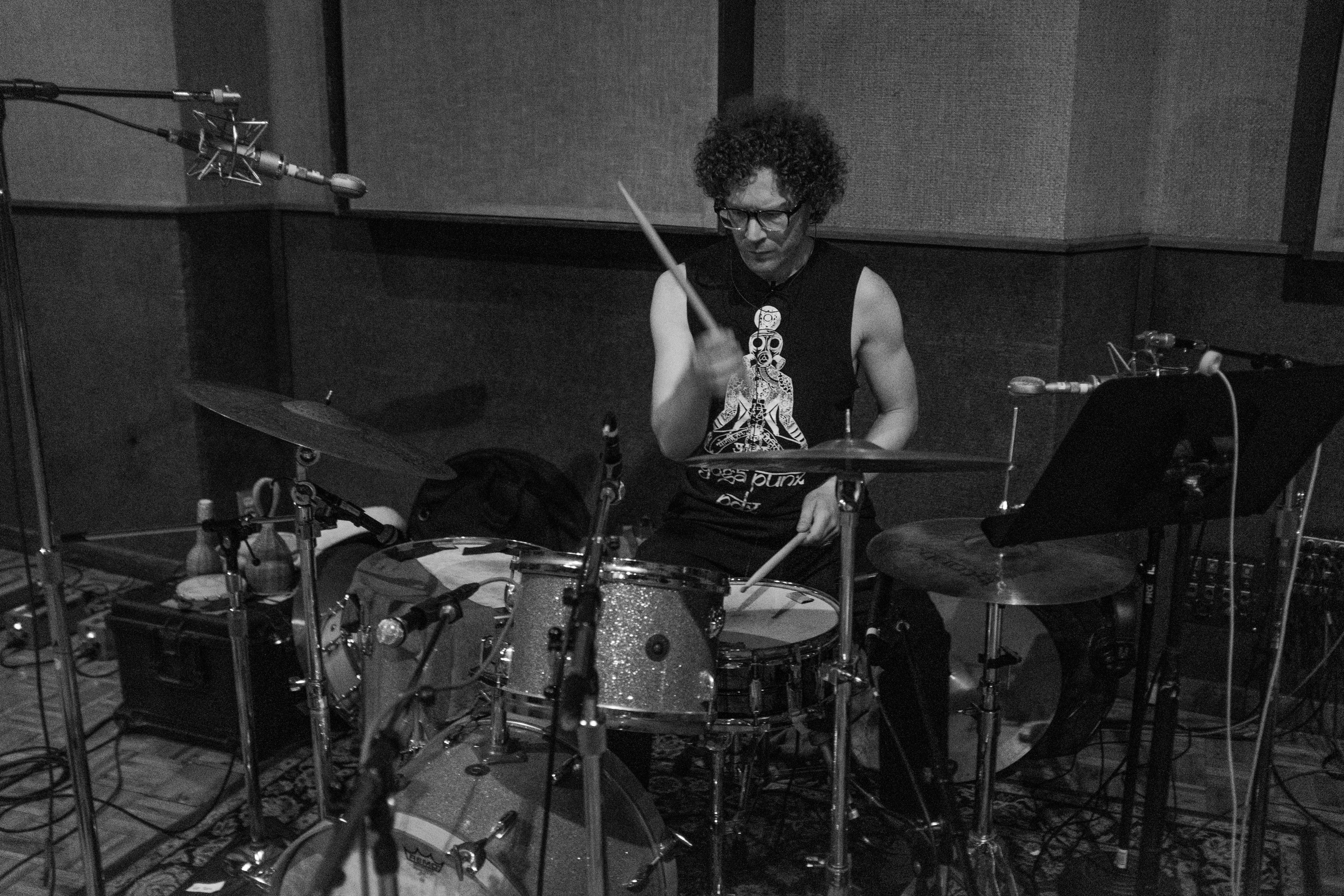
- Nistor at United Recording Studios in July 2018

Background information
- Born: May 22, 1979 (age 47); Detroit, Michigan
- Genres: Rock; jazz
- Occupation: Musician
- Instruments: Drums; keyboards
- Years active: 1996–present

Steven Nistor (born May 22, 1979) is an American touring and studio drummer, best known for his work with Daniel Lanois and Sparks.

== Biography ==
=== Early life ===
Steven Nistor was born and raised in Detroit. He attended Wayne State University where he earned a Bachelor of Jazz Studies on a full scholarship and mentored under Branford Marsalis, Ben Sidran and Kenny Werner. During this time he studied drums with Gerald Cleaver and Scott Amendola, and has since studied with Ralph Humphrey, Ra-Kalam Bob Moses and Dave Elitch.

=== Career ===
Nistor has recorded with producers Rick Rubin, Danger Mouse, Daniel Lanois, Tucker Martine, Randall Dunn, Steve Albini, Ryan Freeland, John Hill, Warren Defever, and Scott Litt and has recorded/performed with Iron & Wine, Sam Amidon, Tinariwen, The Avett Brothers, Van Dyke Parks, Marissa Nadler, Sparklehorse, "Weird Al" Yankovic, Peter Buck, Emmylou Harris, Gnarls Barkley, Todd Rundgren, Wild Belle, Brian Eno, Iggy Pop, Leo Nocentelli, Lonnie Holley, Garth Hudson, Aoife O’Donovan, Passion Pit, The Flaming Lips, Josh Klinghoffer, Ben Sollee, Beth Orton, His Name Is Alive, Hal Willner, Trixie Whitley, Laura Veirs, Bill Frisell, Michael Gibbs, Robert Plant, Buddy Guy, Alison Krauss, Skerik, Jim White, Bernie Worrell, and is a member of the bands Sparks, Brian Blade's Mama Rosa, and WL.

He was featured twice in Modern Drummer magazine, has appeared twice as a guest on the drumming podcast I'd Hit That, has been the featured drummer on Late Night with Seth Meyers twice and has taught at Interlochen Center for the Arts as well as the Detroit Institute of Music Education. Steven has also been featured in four major motion pictures, working with directors Leos Carax, Edgar Wright, and David Lynch.

== Selected discography ==
Artist	Album	Credit	Producer
Sparklehorse	Bird Machine	Drums, Piano	Mark Linkous, Scott Minor, Steve Albini, Alan Weatherhead
Todd Rundgren	Space Force	Drums	Todd Rundgren
Sparks	The Girl Is Crying in Her Latte	Drums	Sparks
Sparks & Todd Rundgren	Your Fandango	Drums	Sparks & Todd Rundgren
Sparks	A Steady Drip, Drip, Drip	Drums	Sparks
Laura Veirs	Fading of Stars	Drums	Tucker Martine
Sparks	Hippopotamus	Drums	Sparks
Arjan Miranda	Spiritual America	Drums	Randall Dunn
Emmylou Harris	The Life and Songs of Emmylou Harris	Drums	Daniel Lanois, Don Was, Buddy Miller
Aoife O'Donovan	Man In A Neon Coat: Live From Cambridge	Drums	None
Marissa Nadler	Strangers	Drums	Randall Dunn
Karl Blau	Introducing Karl Blau	Congas	Tucker Martine
Aoife O'Donovan	In The Magic Hour	Drums	Tucker Martine
Laura Veirs	Warp and Weft	Drums	Tucker Martine
The Avett Brothers	Magpie and the Dandelion	Drums	Rick Rubin
Passion Pit	Gossamer	Drums	Chris Zane
Aoife O’Donovan	Fossils	Drums	Tucker Martine
The Avett Brothers	The Carpenter	Drums	Rick Rubin
Portugal. The Man	In the Mountain in the Cloud	Drums	John Hill
Theophilus London	Timez Are Weird These Days	Drums, Keyboards	John Hill
Sparks	The Seduction of Ingmar Bergman	Drums	Sparks
His Name Is Alive	The Eclipse	Drums, Percussion	Warren Defever
Danger Mouse, Sparklehorse, & David Lynch	Dark Night of the Soul	Drums, Percussion, Wurlitzer	Danger Mouse
Gnarls Barkley	The Odd Couple	Drums	Danger Mouse
Brandi Carlile	Downpour (Live From Boston)	Drums	None
Joker's Daughter	The Last Laugh	Drums	Danger Mouse
Martina Topley-Bird	The Blue God	Drums	Danger Mouse
The Shortwave Set	Replica Sun Machine	Drums	Danger Mouse
Daniel Lanois	Here Is What Is	Drums	Daniel Lanois
Daniel Lanois	Santiago	Drums	Daniel Lanois

== Selected filmography ==
Film	Credit	Director	Year
Annette	Himself	Leos Carax	2021
The Sparks Brothers	Himself	Edgar Wright	2021
The Life and Songs of Emmylou Harris	Himself	Justin Kreutzmann	2016
loudQUIETloud: a film about the Pixies	Himself	Steven Cantor	2006
