= Receiver (album) =

Studio album by Farmer Not So John
- Released: 19 May 1998
- Genre: Rock, Alternative country
- Length: 47:17
- Label: Compass Records
- Producer: Tucker Martine

Farmer Not So John chronology
Farmer Not So John (1997)	Receiver (1998)

Professional ratings
Review scores
Source	Rating
AllMusic	4.5/5 stars

Receiver is the second album by the band Farmer Not So John, released in 1998. It was the band's final album.

== Critical reception ==
No Depression wrote that the band "churns out a difficult-to-pigeonhole sound that variously recalls early R.E.M., the first couple of Jayhawks records and the desolate edge of Neil Young’s more brooding efforts with Crazy Horse." The Associated Press called the album "excellent," writing that Farmer Not So John is "one of those impossible-to-classify bands, the kind that the small minds of so many radio programmers cannot make room for and therefore cannot add to their play lists, which is a real shame."

== Track listing ==
1. "Paperthin"
2. "Fuse"
3. "Consigned To Oblivion"
4. "Rise Above The Wreckage"
5. "For You I Will Pretend"
6. "Undertow"
7. "No Time To Please You"
8. "Me Too"
9. "Grand Bouquet"
10. "Pen Across The Page"

== Performers ==
Farmer Not So John

- Mack Linebaugh (vocals, electric & acoustic guitar)
- Brian Ray (bass, vocals)
- Richard McLaurin (acoustic, electric, 12-string, lap steel & toy guitars, mandolin, banjo, fiddle, accordion, tambourine, vocals)
- Sean R. Keith (drums).

Additional personnel

- Matthew Ryan (vocals, electric guitar)
- Peter Rowan (vocals, mandola)
- Daniel Tashian (vocals, Wurlitzer, synthesizer)
- Sean Ray (pedal steel guitar)
- Clive Gregson (organ, synthesizer)
- Tucker Martine (tambourine, cymbals, shaker, loops, sound effects)
