= Feast of the Hunter's Moon =

Feast of the Hunters' Moon

Studio album by Black Prairie
- Released: April 13, 2010
- Recorded: 2009, Jackpot! Recording Studio
- Length: 51:30
- Label: Sugar Hill
- Producer: Tucker Martine

Black Prairie chronology
| ''Feast of the Hunters' Moon'' (2010) | A Tear in the Eye Is a Wound in the Heart (2012) |

Feast of the Hunters' Moon is the debut album by Portland, Oregon-based string band Black Prairie, released in 2010 on Sugar Hill Records.

== Track list ==
1. Across The Black Prairie
2. Red Rocking Chair
3. Back Alley
4. Ostinato Del Caminito
5. A Prairie Musette
6. Crooked Little Heart
7. Annie McGuire
8. Atrocity at Celilo Falls
9. Tango Oscuro
10. Single Mistake
11. Full Moon in June
12. Home Made Lemonade
13. The Blackest Crow

== Personnel ==
- Jenny Conlee - Accordion
- Chris Funk - Resonator guitar
- Jon Neufeld - Guitar
- Nate Query - Bass
- Annalisa Tornfelt - Fiddle and Vocals
- Tucker Martine - Producer

== Chart performance ==
| Chart (2010) | Peak position |
|---|---|
| US Billboard Top Bluegrass Albums | 4 |
