= The Lookout (album) =

Studio album by Laura Veirs
- Released: April 13, 2018
- Recorded: 2017
- Studios: Flora Recording & Playback, Portland, Oregon, U.S.
- Genre: Indie folk
- Length: 38:30
- Labels: Bella Union; Raven Marching Band
- Producer: Tucker Martine

Laura Veirs chronology
case/lang/veirs (2016)	The Lookout (2018)	My Echo (2020)

The Lookout is the tenth studio album by American folk musician Laura Veirs, released on April 13, 2018 by Raven Marching Band Records to a positive critical reception. Veirs recorded the work around her collaboration case/lang/veirs and continued a streak of working with her husband Tucker Martine as producer.

== Recording and release ==
The music card might say, 'write in 5/4'; the lyric card might be 'use the first line of a poem' and the mood might be 'sad' or whatever. I was tricking myself into feeling surprised and forcing myself to try something new. There were aspects of it that were super annoying (because you had to do what the cards told you to), but it forced me to be disciplined and do the work.

While touring and recording with case/lang/veirs, Veirs spent a year writing songs for the album, totaling 117 but only recording 14 that made up the final 12-song track listing for The Lookout. Her writing process involved a structured approach of four hour days four days a week, alongside a stochastic approach that involve using prompts for a song's mood, lyrical theme, and musical theme. Leading up to the release of the album, Veirs posted several of these cards onto her social media accounts and created a music video for "Everybody Needs You", released on January 30, 2018. Digital streaming for "Watch Fire" and a music video for "Lightning Rod" preceded the album. She promoted the release with a short tour of Europe and North America.

Veirs' lyrical content is written in response to personal anxieties and insecurities as well as the political climate after the 2016 United States presidential election and the album is summed up with "Zozobra" as a hopeful song to provide solace to listeners. Although these themes were not deliberate, the title The Lookout came from the need that emerged for all of us to take care of one another in trying times. The song is also an ode to honor her then-husband Tucker Martine. Motherhood inspired her writing and her children perform vocals on one song.

== Critical reception ==
Professional ratings
Aggregate scores
Source	Rating
AnyDecentMusic?	7.6/10
Metacritic	82/100
Review scores
Source	Rating
AllMusic	4/5 stars
American Songwriter	4/5
Drowned in Sound	7/10
Exclaim!	8/10
The Guardian	4/5 stars
The Independent	4/5 stars
The Line of Best Fit	7.5/10
MusicOMH	4/5 stars
NME	4/5 stars
Paste	7.4/10

According to the review aggregator Metacritic, The Lookout received "universal acclaim" based on a weighted average score of 82 out of 100 from 18 critic scores. At Album of the Year, the editorial characterized critical consensus as a 79 out of 100 with 17 reviewers and AnyDecentMusic? rated the album 7.6 out of 10.

The editorial staff of AllMusic named this release among the best of 2018 and awarded it four out of five stars, with reviewer James Christopher Monger calling it "a sonically breezy yet lyrically bold amalgam of imagery-rich Pacific Northwest Americana, reverb-laden indie pop, and intimate electronics-tinged folk" that is "her most compelling set of material to date". Stephen Thompson of NPR's First Listen called the performances on the album characterized by "uncommon warmth and grace, in songs that shimmer softly without sacrificing directness or power". Pablo Gorondi of the Associated Press summed up a positive review writing, "The excellent musicianship... expands the guitar/piano foundations to ideal degrees of sound, just as Veirs' details of scandal-free intimacy result in an album that’s exhaustively gratifying." For American Songwriter, Hal Horowitz's four-out-of-five star review praises Veir's vocals and her varied songwriting. Eugenie Johnson of Drowned in Sound gave the album seven out of 10, with a review that also points out Veirs' songwriting, with the ability to mix broad and political themes with personal experience. Sarah Greene of Exclaim! considers the album an artistic success, summing up her review: "Like the campfires people gather around throughout the record, The Lookout is meant to offer comfort; which it does".

Phil Mongredien of The Guardian gave the album four out of five stars, calling it her "most satisfying [album] yet". Ilana Kaplan gave the same rating in The Independent and emphasized Veir's lyrical tenderness. In musicOMH, Stephanie Flooks also gave the release four stars of five, summing up that The Outlook is what Veirs does best: "Instantly recognisable and comforting, she opens her personal world up as safe haven in these strange and noisy times, whilst still keeping you at arm's length, listening for secrets." A fourth British music publication that gave the album four out of five stars was NME, with reviewer Thea de Galleir calling it an "optimistic manifesto" with the songwriting "ability to tell stories without being blasé or obvious is what’s given her a long career in a fluctuating music world".

In Paste, Eric R. Danton gave the album 7.4 out of 10, with a review that pans some musical elements and the song "Canyon" but calls these criticisms "quibbles" among strong and varied songwriting. Charles Donovan of PopMatters also emphasized Veirs' solid songwriting across this album as well as her career, challenging listeners to pay close attention: "the danger is that Veirs' work, if experienced as wallpaper music, will come across as merely pleasant when it's really so much more". In Record Collector, Kyle Lonsdale agrees with the consistent quality of Veirs' recordings, giving The Lookout four out of five stars. Writing for The Straits Times, another four out of five comes from Yeow Kai Chai who says that Veirs is "in a zone of her own" and "one of America's best-kept secrets" for her songwriting as well as her vocal delivery. Jon Putnam of The Line of Best Fit gave this release 7.5 out of 10, writing that "sturdy and insightful songs and its musical sparseness is surely designed in part to accentuate Veirs’ consummate songwriting".

== Track listing ==
All songs written by Laura Veirs, except where noted.

1. "Margaret Sands" – 2:57
2. "Everybody Needs You" – 2:54
3. "Seven Falls" – 4:04
4. "Mountains of the Moon" (Jerry Garcia, Robert Hunter) – 4:16
5. "Watch Fire" – 2:36
6. "Heavy Petals" – 2:39
7. "The Lookout" – 2:04
8. "The Meadow" – 2:42
9. "The Canyon" – 3:42
10. "Lightning Rod" – 3:20
11. "When It Grows Darkest" – 4:31
12. "Zozobra" – 2:45

== Personnel ==
Credits are adapted from The Lookout liner notes.

- Laura Veirs – acoustic and electric guitar, harmony and lead vocals, piano on "The Meadow", photography
- Karl Blau – synthesizer on "Everybody Needs You", vocals on "Margaret Sands"
- Justin Chase – assistant engineering, e-bow on "Zozobra", piano on "Watch Fire"
- Dave Cooley – mastering at Elysian Masters
- Eden Dawn – design
- Izar Etxeberria – illustrations
- Jon Hyde – pedal steel guitar
- Jim James – lead guitar on "Lightning Rod", vocal harmony on "Mountains of the Moon" and "Lightning Rod"
- Eyvind Kang – viola
- Oz Martine – vocals on "Lightning Rod"
- Tennessee Martine – vocals on "Lightning Rod"
- Tucker Martine – bass harmonica, cover design, drums, synthesizer on "Margaret Sands", drum programming, engineering, mixing, percussion, producer
- Eli Moore – bass guitar, guitar, synthesizer
- Steve Moore – electric harpsichord, keyboards, piano, synthesizer
- Jon Neufeld – archguitar on "Margaret Sands" and "Everybody Needs You"
- Jason Quigley – cover photo
- Cora Reese – vocals on "Lightning Rod"
- Sufjan Stevens – vocals on "Watch Fire"
- Doug Wieselman – clarinet on "Heavy Petals"

== Charts ==
The Lookout had only modest chart success, spending one week on the American independent and Belgian albums charts.

Chart performance for The Lookout
Chart (2018)	Peak
Belgian Albums (Ultratop Flanders)	124
Belgian Albums (Ultratop Wallonia)	132
US Independent Albums (Billboard)	34

== See also ==
- Oblique Strategies: a card-based method for creative inspiration designed by Brian Eno and Peter Schmidt
