= Two Beers Veirs =

EP by Laura Veirs
- Released: October 29, 2008
- Genre: Folk
- Length: 16:08
- Label: Raven Marching Band Records

Laura Veirs chronology
Saltbreakers (2007)	Two Beers Veirs (2008)	July Flame (2010)

Two Beers Veirs is a self-released EP released by American singer-songwriter Laura Veirs in 2008. It features covers of traditional folk songs, ranging from traditional ballads to an Elizabeth Cotten song.

According to the liner notes for this EP "Tucker and I spontaneously recorded this EP late one February night. I love these songs - I've been playing most of them for about 10 years. They've brought me a lot of pleasure and have informed my playing style" Enjoy - Laura Veirs, Portland, OR May 2008 - Recorded and Mixed by Tucker Martine, Flora, Portland, OR. The artwork was by Laura Veirs, adapted from John Alcorn's illustrations in "The Fireside Book of Children's Songs (1966).

== Track listing ==
1. "Spike Drivers Blues" – 2:44
2. "Wildwood Flower" – 3:53
3. "The Coo Coo Bird" – 3:10
4. "Freight Train" – 3:00
5. "Wasps of Rain" – 3:18
