= Farmer Not So John (album) =

Studio album by Farmer Not So John
- Released: February 11, 1997
- Recorded: 1996
- Genre: Rock, alternative country
- Length: 47:40
- Label: Compass
- Producer: Richard McLaurin

Farmer Not So John chronology
Farmer Not So John (album) (1997)	Receiver (1998)

Professional ratings
Review scores
Source	Rating
Allmusic	link

Farmer Not So John is the self-titled debut album from the band Farmer Not So John released in 1997. The albums was recorded at Recorded at Monkey Finger Studios in Nashville, Tennessee.

== Track listing ==
1. "Fire in the Valley" (Mack Linebaugh) – 3:53
2. "Rusty Weathervane" (Brian Ray) – 4:12
3. "Every Street in Nashville" (Linebaugh) – 4:17
4. "Of Angels" (Linebaugh, Ray) – 4:36
5. "Fool's Lullaby"
6. "Paperweight of the World" (Ray) – 3:19
7. "The Hole We're In" (Linebaugh) – 4:40
8. "Cradled" (Linebaugh, Ray) – 4:06
9. "Sacred Cow" (Sean Keith, Linebaugh, Richard McLaurin, Ray) – 4:57
10. "This Is Our House" (Linebaugh) – 4:17
11. "Travelin' Fool" (Linebaugh) – 5:07

== Personnel ==
Farmer Not So John

- Mack Linebaugh – vocals, electric and acoustic guitar
- Brian Ray – bass, vocals
- Richard McLaurin – electric and acoustic guitar, lap steel guitar, dobro, mandolin, octave mandolin, organ, percussion, vocals
- Sean R. Keith – drums

Additional personnel

- Sean Ray – pedal steel guitar
- Jerry Dale McFadden – accordion
- Steve Conn, Kris Kerr – organ
- Emmylou Truitt – bark
