= My Echo =

Studio album by Laura Veirs
- Released: October 23, 2020
- Recorded: Tucker Martine's home studio, Portland, Oregon, U.S.
- Length: 33:54
- Labels: Bella Union; Raven Marching Band
- Producer: Tucker Martine

Laura Veirs chronology
The Lookout (2018)	My Echo (2020)	Found Light (2022)

My Echo is the eleventh studio album by American singer-songwriter Laura Veirs, released on October 23, 2020 by Raven Marching Band. The album received a positive reception from music critics.

== Recording and release ==
On Valentine's Day 2020, Veirs released the song "I Was a Fool"; the song discusses her divorce as do the tracks on My Echo. Veirs calls My Echo "an album about disintegration". The album was produced with longtime collaborator and Veirs' ex-husband Tucker Martine and was preceded by music videos for "Burn Too Bright" in July and "Turquoise Walls" in August.

== Critical reception ==
Professional ratings
Aggregate scores
Source	Rating
Album of the Year	80 out of 100
AnyDecentMusic?	7.4 out of 10
Metacritic	84 out of 100
Review scores
Source	Rating
AllMusic	4/5 stars
Exclaim!	8 out of 10
Financial Times	4/5 stars
MusicOMH	4/5 stars
Paste	7.7 out of 10
Slant Magazine	3.5/5 stars

According to the review aggregator Metacritic, My Echo received "universal acclaim" based on a weighted average score of 84 out of 100 from eight critic scores. Album of the Year sums up critical consensus as an 80 out of 100 based on five reviews and AnyDecentMusic? considers My Echo a 7.4 out of 10, also based on five reviewers.

Sara Chodos of Exclaim! gave the release an eight out of 10, praising the diversity of musicianship and instrumentation. In New Statesman, Ellen Perison-Hagger declared Veirs "one of the greatest living American songwriters" for her ability to use music as catharsis. Maeri Ferguson of No Depression's review emphasized the solitude in the album's lyrics and the Veirs' "stunningly spare" vocals, especially paired with Jim James. In a 7.7 out of 10 review for Paste, Ben Salmon points out Veirs' comforting confronting the unknown in her lyrics as her personal relationship was deteriorating during recording. Steve Horowitz of PopMatters discusses this disintegration and the "claustrophobic themes of confinement" in his review, ending it: "Love can't conquer all. Some disasters are just too big, and we end up singing to ourselves. That's why there is music." Eric Mason of Slant Magazine considers the recording "an act of self-preservation" in a "backdrop of hopelessness brought about by personal heartbreak and global disasters". In Financial Times, David Chesal gave My Echo four out of five stars for "a break-up album [that is] remarkably easy to listen to". Ben Hogwood of musicOMH gave My Echo the same rating, noting the highly skilled musicians and summing up that this album is "sometimes difficult but never less than involving".

Samantha Small of Under the Radar reviewed "Burn Too Bright" upon its release, naming it one of the songs of the week. Concluding the review for AllMusic, Mark Deming claimed that "My Echo creates beauty out of fear and uncertainty, and it's among Laura Veirs' most personal and satisfying works to date."

== Track listing ==
1. "Freedom Feeling" – 3:19
2. "Another Space and Time" – 4:40
3. "Turquoise Walls" – 2:39
4. "Memaloose Island" – 3:34
5. "End Times" – 3:06
6. "Burn Too Bright" – 2:59
7. "Brick Layer" – 2:30
8. "All the Things" – 3:27
9. "I Sing to the Tall Man" – 3:09
10. "Vapor Trails" – 4:31

== Personnel ==
Credits are adapted from the My Echo liner notes.

- Laura Veirs – vocals; electric guitar on "Freedom Feeling"; nylon guitar on "Another Space and Time", "Burn Too Bright", "Brick Layer", "All the Things", and "I Sing to the Tall Man"; banjo on "Turquoise Walls", Nashville guitar on "Turquoise Walls", acoustic guitar on "Memaloose Island" and "Vapor Trails", piano on "End Times", keyboards on "I Sing to the Tall Man"
- Karl Blau – vocals on "Another Space and Time" and "Brick Layer"; bass guitar on "Freedom Feeling", "Another Space and Time", "Turquoise Walls", 10), saxophone on "Another Space and Time"; snaps on "Another Space and Time"; baritone guitar on "Turquoise Walls"; synthesizer on "Turquoise Walls"; electric guitar on "Burn Too Bright"; Moog synth on "Burn Too Bright", feedback on "Brick Layer"
- Justin Chase – piano on "Another Space and Time"; baritone guitar on "Another Space and Time" and "Memaloose Island"; synthesizer on "Another Space and Time", "Memaloose Island", and "End Times"; e-bow guitar on "Memaloose Island"; electric guitar "Burn Too Bright"; Moog synth pads on "Brick Layer"; engineering
- Bill Frisell – electric guitar on "All the Things"
- Jim James – vocals "All the Things"
- Tucker Martine – drums on "Freedom Feeling", "Turquoise Walls", "Memaloose Island", and "Burn Too Bright"; percussion on "Another Space and Time"; engineering; mixing on "Freedom Feeling", "Another Space and Time", "Turquoise Walls", and "Memaloose Island"; production
- Adrian Olsen – mixing on "End Times", "Burn Too Bright", "Brick Layer", "All the Things", "I Sing to the Tall Man", and "Vapor Trails
- Noel Summerville – mastering
- Matt Ward – electric guitar on "Vapor Trails"
