= Blind Pilot =

American indie folk band

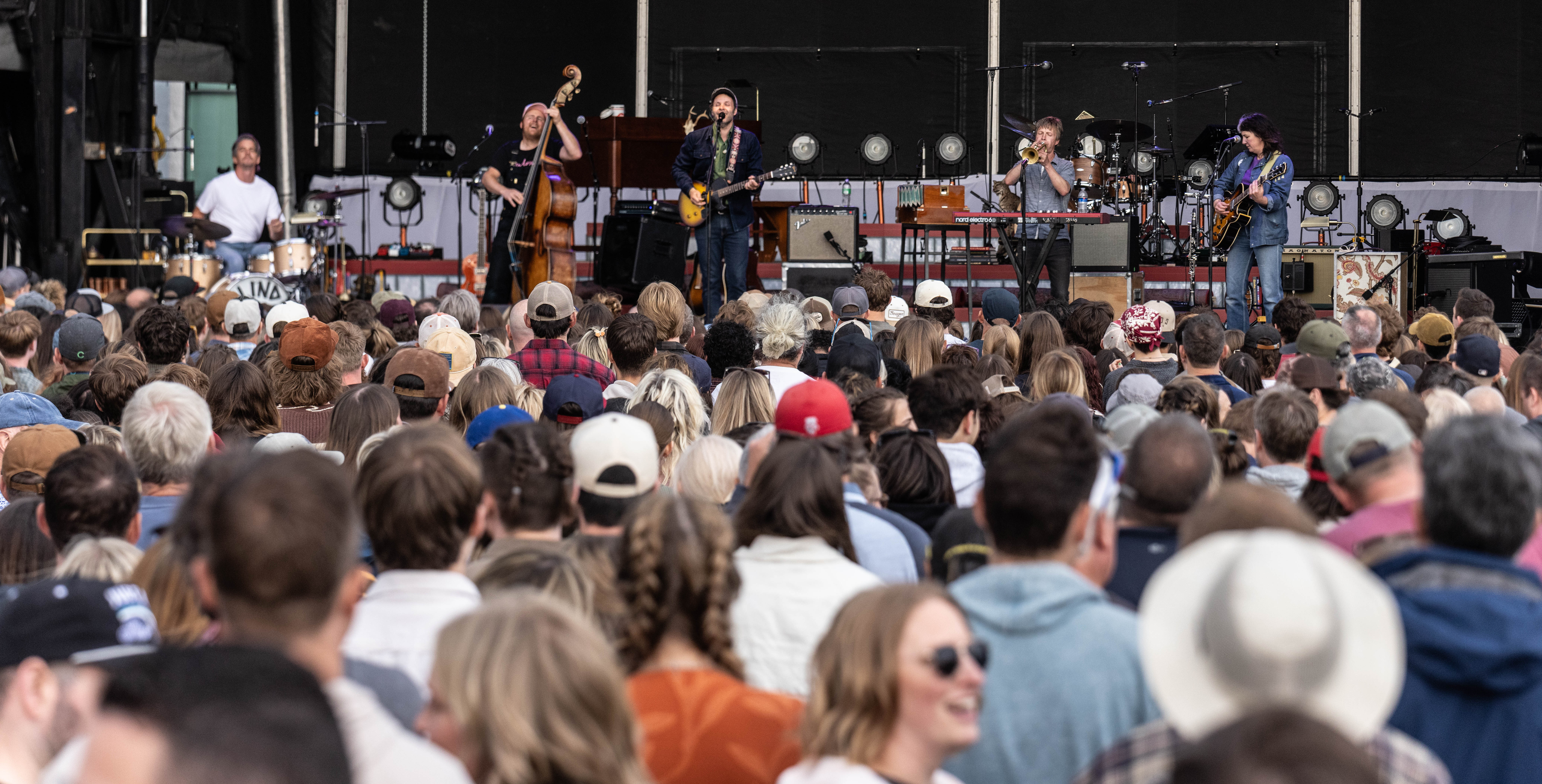
- Blind Pilot in 2025

Background information
- Origin: Astoria, Oregon
- Genres: Indie folk, indie pop
- Years active: 2005–present
- Labels: Expunged, ATO
- Members: Israel Nebeker; Ryan Dobrowski; Luke Ydstie; Kati Claborn; Ian Krist; Dave Jorgensen
- Website: www.blindpilot.com

Blind Pilot is an American indie folk band based in Portland, Oregon, United States. They have released four albums and one EP since 2008.

== History ==
On July 15, 2008, Blind Pilot released their debut CD 3 Rounds and a Sound on Expunged Records. "Go On, Say It", was chosen to be a Single of the Week on July 7, 2008 on the iTunes chart, and for the week of July 26 the record reached number 13 on the Billboard Top Digital Albums chart. Allmusic gave the album 3.5/5 stars.

Originally a duo between Israel Nebeker and Ryan Dobrowski, the band added four touring members in February 2009. On December 29 of that year, the band released an iTunes only live EP. This EP featured a cover of Gillian Welch's "Look at Miss Ohio". The EP also included new versions of previously released songs, along with a new song, titled "Get It Out". The EP was mixed and recorded by Tucker Martine.

Blind Pilot released their second album, We Are The Tide, on September 13, 2011 as a sextet. The album featured the song "Get It Out" from the previous EP. Allmusic praised the additional members, who they said "add bigger, brighter colors to the mix" in a 4.5-star review.

On June 1, 2016, Blind Pilot announced their third album, And Then Like Lions, would be released August 12 on ATO Records. The album received 'universal acclaim' from Metacritic, with a score of 71 out of 100 from critics.

After an eight-year hiatus from releasing new music, Blind Pilot announced a new album titled In The Shadow of the Holy Mountain on June 18, 2024, set for release on August 16. The announcement was made on social media, where the band expressed their excitement about the new project, stating "We made an album! We love it and we cannot wait to share it with you." The first single from the album, "Just A Bird," was released on the same day as the announcement.

On the day of the new album's release, Israel Nebeker wrote on Instagram "Last June, I woke up with a very funny thought, after years of struggling to complete another Blind Pilot album. 'I should write an album in a month, and whatever it is, I should bring that to the band and let the band create as its own living, breathing entity with whatever songs come through.' That one thought, in the between state of dreaming and waking, set such a beautiful project into motion. The way we recorded this album was with the utter joy of exploration, the yes of appreciation for one another, and more love that I've ever felt in a studio before. It's our favorite album that we've made, and we are so excited to share it with you today. We hope it brings you joy, and moves you in the way it has us. Thank you a million times for waiting. This is my happiest day in years. Thank you for all that you've given us over the years. A path to be on. A place for our music to go. We're so glad to give this album to you all today. We hope you love it."

== Origin of the band name ==
The name "Blind Pilot" was conceived by the founding members, Israel Nebeker and Ryan Dobrowski, during the early days of the band in Astoria, Oregon. The name emerged while they were residing in an old cannery building located at the confluence of the Columbia River and the Pacific Ocean, where they would often see pilot boats navigating the waters. Inspired by the visual impact of the word "pilot" marked on these boats and considering their impending first tour by bicycle, the duo felt the name resonated with their venture into the unknown. Israel Nebeker elaborated on the choice of the name during a 2012 interview with Imagine TV Network in Singapore, explaining that the term "blind" aptly described their initial music tour. They were about to embark on their first bike tour without any prior experience or comprehensive planning, metaphorically going into it "blind."

In a 2009 interview with LAist, Nebeker further highlighted the aptness of the name, describing a "blind pilot" as a metaphor for diving into the unknown and navigating uncharted territories, mirroring their experiences as they started their musical journey without a clear path.

== Performance and touring history ==
The band completed a bicycle tour in 2008, biking from Bellingham, Washington to San Diego, California, carrying their instruments on custom bicycle trailers they fashioned themselves. They made more than two dozen stops along the way, including Port Townsend, Seattle, Olympia, Portland, Corvallis, Eugene, Coos Bay, Arcata and Santa Cruz.

Touring for their debut album continued in 2009. On February 12, Blind Pilot made their network television debut on Last Call with Carson Daly. In May, they played at the Sasquatch! Music Festival at the Gorge Amphitheatre in George, Washington, and in August they played at Lollapalooza in Chicago and Outside Lands in San Francisco.

To promote We Are The Tide on January 6, 2012, the band made their second network television appearance on the Late Show with David Letterman, in which Letterman initially introduced the band as "Blind Spot" before correcting himself and poking fun at the gaffe. Subsequent touring for the album included a performance at the Bonnaroo Music Festival in Manchester, Tennessee on June 9, as well as returns to Lollapalooza and Sasquatch. Their song "Half Moon" was performed on Ellen during the host's birthday episode on January 25, 2013. Blind Pilot's music has been featured in some television programs, including Chuck, One Tree Hill, Californication, and Private Practice.

The band finished their tour with Vance Joy on December 3, 2016. Their tour with Bad Bad Habits, Anna Tivel, and Gregory Alan Isakov ran from 2017 to mid-2018.

In preparation for their newest album in 8 years, In The Shadow of the Holy Mountain, Blind Pilot toured in their new quartet form (consisting of Israel Nebeker, Ryan Dobrowski, Luke Ydstie, and Kati Claborn, as well as with some contribution from violinist and Blind Pilot Tour Manager Lauren Jacobson) all across the country, starting on June 16, 2024, in Medford, Oregon, and continuing through November 2024

== Band members ==
- Israel Nebeker – vocals, guitar
- Ryan Dobrowski – drums, percussion
- Luke Ydstie – upright bass, bass guitar, backing vocals
- Kati Claborn – banjo, mountain dulcimer, ukulele, banjo ukulele, guitar, bass guitar, additional percussion, backing vocals
- Dave Jorgensen – trumpet, keyboards
- Ian Krist – vibraphone, additional percussion

== Discography ==
=== Albums ===
Title	Album details	Peak chart positions					Sales
Title	Album details	US	US Alt	US Folk	US Indie	US Rock	Sales
3 Rounds and a Sound	Released: July 15, 2008; Label: Expunged	149	—	—	22	—	
We Are the Tide	Released: September 13, 2011; Label: Expunged	56	10	2	14	19	US: 65,000
And Then Like Lions	Released: August 12, 2016; Label: ATO Records	79	7	2	4	7	
In The Shadow Of The Holy Mountain	Released: August 16, 2024; Label: ATO Records	—	—	—	—	—	
"—" denotes album that did not chart or was not released

Drummer Ryan Dobrowski, a professional artist based in Tucson, did the artwork for 3 Rounds and a Sound, We Are the Tide, and In the Shadow of the Holy Mountain, as well as the singles Like A Bird, Jacaranda, and Brave.

=== EPs ===
Title	Album details	Peak chart positions		
Title	Album details	US	US Folk	US Indie
iTunes Session - EP	Released: December 29, 2009; Label: Expunged	— (Note: iTunes Session - EP did not enter the US Billboard 200, but peaked at number seven on the US Heatseekers Albums Chart.)	6	39
"—" denotes album that did not chart or was not released

=== Singles ===
Year	Title	Peak chart positions		Album
Year	Title	US AAA	UK Indie	Album
2008	"Go On, Say It"	—	—	3 Rounds and a Sound
2012	"Half Moon"	17	36	We Are the Tide
2013	"We Are the Tide"	20	—	We Are the Tide
2016	"Umpqua Rushing"	—	—	And Then Like Lions
2016	"Packed Powder"	9	—	And Then Like Lions
2024	"Just a Bird"	—	—	In the Shadow of a Holy Mountain
2024	"Jacaranda"	—	—	In the Shadow of a Holy Mountain
"—" denotes album that did not chart or was not released
