= The Triumphs and Travails of Orphan Mae =

Studio album by Laura Veirs
- Released: July 10, 2001
- Recorded: August 2000
- Genre: Folk
- Length: 38:49
- Label: Raven Marching Band
- Producer: Tucker Martine

Laura Veirs chronology
Laura Veirs (1999)	The Triumphs and Travails of Orphan Mae (2001)	Troubled by the Fire (2003)

Professional ratings
Review scores
Source	Rating
AllMusic	4/5 stars
Pitchfork	7.5/10

The Triumphs and Travails of Orphan Mae is the second studio album by Laura Veirs, self-released in 2001. It was subsequently re-released under the Bella Union label on February 21, 2005.

== Track listing ==
1. "Jailhouse Fire" – 2:32
2. "Up the River" – 3:22
3. "John Henry Lives" – 4:07
4. "Black-Eyed Susan" – 3:41
5. "Orphan Mae" – 2:01
6. "Blue Ink" – 4:41
7. "Montague Road" – 3:57
8. "Through December" – 4:15
9. "Raven Marching Band" – 5:16
10. "Movin' Along" – 4:56
