= A Tear in the Eye Is a Wound in the Heart =

Studio album by Black Prairie
- Released: September 18, 2012
- Genre: Americana
- Length: 1:08:49
- Label: Sugar Hill Records
- Producer: Tucker Martine

Black Prairie chronology
Feast of the Hunter's Moon (2010)	A Tear in the Eye Is a Wound in the Heart (2012)	The Storm in the Barn (2012)

A Tear in the Eye Is a Wound in the Heart is the second studio album released by Portland, Oregon-based string band Black Prairie. It was released on September 18, 2012.

== Track listing ==
All tracks are written by Black Prairie

No.	Title	Length
1.	"Ms. Sindell"	0:24
2.	"Rock of Ages"	4:04
3.	"For the Love of John Hartford"	2:56
4.	"Nowhere, Massachusetts"	3:07
5.	"More Jam for Ras"	0:30
6.	"How Do You Ruin Me?"	3:19
7.	"Dirty River Stomp"	3:26
8.	"Evil Leaves"	2:55
9.	"What You Gave"	3:37
10.	"Jump Up Jon"	1:25
11.	"Winter Wind"	2:49
12.	"Little Song Bird"	4:10
13.	"Taraf"	4:52
14.	"Richard Manuel"	3:49
15.	"34 Wishes: The Legend Of"	7:51
16.	"Lay Me Down in Tennessee" (Hidden Track)	19:36

== Personnel ==
The album was composed by Black Prairie.

- Hanz Araki
- Paul Beck: Cymbalom
- Jenny Conlee: Piano, violin
- Chris Funk: Banjo, autoharp
- Tucker Martine: Producer
- John Moen: Percussion
- Jon Neufeld: Guitar, autoharp
- Andy Schichter: Assistant
- Roger Seibel: mastering
- Nate Query: Bass, cello
- Annalisa Tornfelt of Bearfoot: Vocals, violin

== Chart performance ==
The album peaked at number 4 on the Billboard Top Bluegrass Albums chart.

Chart (2012)	Peak position
US Billboard Top Bluegrass Albums	4

== Critical reception ==
Several have noted that the album is beautiful, noting the vocals of Annalisa Tornfelt from Bearfoot. Steve Leggett of Allmusic wrote that "this fine second album shows the growth, poise, and vision of a completely separate band. A lot of this is due to the beautifully nuanced vocals of Annalisa Tornfelt, whose hushed, unhurried, and wonderfully balanced singing makes songs here like "Rock of Ages" and "Nowhere, Massachusetts" sound ageless, comforting, and wise." Geoffrey Himes of The Washington Post described the album as "impressive" and that "Tornfelt’s cool soprano and minimalist lyrics rein in the band’s wilder impulses and focus the sound on her tales of disappointed lovers, revivifying nature and the suicide of the Band’s Richard Manuel."
