= Found Light =

Studio album by Laura Veirs
- Released: July 8, 2022
- Genre: Folk
- Length: 46:16
- Labels: Bella Union; Raven Marching Band
- Producers: Shahzad Ismaily; Laura Veirs

Laura Veirs chronology
My Echo (2020)	Found Light (2022)	Phone Orphans (2023)

Found Light is the twelfth studio album by American singer-songwriter Laura Veirs, released on July 8, 2022. This is the first album without long-time producer Tucker Martine and also the first where Veirs recorded her guitar and vocals simultaneously. It has received positive critical reception.

== Recording ==
Found Light is Veirs' first album without producer and ex-husband Tucker Martine since 2001. Veirs co-produced the album with Shahzad Ismaily and attempted to change how she made it, such as recording her guitar part and vocals simultaneously and also using different guitar tunings to have different voicings. Usually, when preparing a new album, Veirs will write 200 or 300 songs, re-writing and drafting parts of song elements until she can finalize the album with her best compositions; for Found Light, she pared down the preparation process to 80 or so revisions, making around 30 complete songs and resulting in 14 on the final release.

== Critical reception ==
The album has received several positive reviews from critics, including Mark Deming of AllMusic, who sums up his review calling this release, "an engaging new chapter in the career of a gifted songwriter"; the site's editorial group gave it four out of five stars. Steve Horowitz of PopMatters also considers this a departure from Veirs' previous work, calling this "more inquisitive and exploratory (and even experimental) than before" and scoring it a seven out of 10. A similar score came from Pitchfork's Brian Howe; his 7.6 out of 10 praises the performer's voice and songwriting for "compact, allusive songs". Writing in The Guardian, Rachel Aroesti gave Found Light four out of five stars for the singer's voice, the diversity of emotions in the music, and particularly Veirs' "hugely arresting" lyrics. In Paste, Annie Parnell characterizes these emotions and lyrics as a "stirring song cycle that deals in the beauty and agony of transformation"; she scored the album an eight out of 10. John Amen of No Depression also notes the lyrical depth, as well as the diversity of musical genre influences in a positive assessment.

== Track listing ==
All songs written by Laura Veirs, except where noted

1. "Autumn Song" – 3:38
2. "Ring Song" – 3:13
3. "Seaside Haiku" – 3:08
4. "Naked Hymn" – 4:00
5. "My Lantern" – 3:01
6. "Signal" – 4:11
7. "Can't Help But Sing" – 3:00
8. "Eucalyptus" – 4:27
9. "New Arms" – 2:58
10. "Sword Song" – 2:55
11. "Time Will Show You" – 4:07
12. "T & O" – 2:20
13. "Komorebi" (Aaron Roche) – 2:21
14. "Winter Windows" – 2:54

== Personnel ==
- Laura Veirs – vocals; guitar; synthesizer on "Ring Song" and "Komorebi"; electric guitar on "Seaside Haiku", "New Arms", and "Winter Windows"; steel string guitar on "My Lantern"; finger snaps on "Signal"; beats on "Eucalyptus"; field recordings on "Eucalyptus"; production; interior painting
- Sam Amidon – backing vocals on "My Lantern", fiddle on "Time Will Show You"
- Karl Blau – guitar on "My Lantern", backing vocals on "New Arms"
- Josh Bonati – mastering at GZ Media – 238444E
- Shelby Bracken – photography
- Dave Depper – beats on "Eucalyptus"; engineering on "Autumn Song", "Naked Hymn", "Eucalyptus", and "Sword Song"
- Rachel Frankel – design
- Charlotte Greve – alto saxophone on "Naked Hymn", clarinet on "My Lantern", flute on "Time Will Show You"
- Shahzad Ismaily – bass guitar on "Autumn Song", "Ring Song", "Seaside Haiku", "My Lantern", "Signal", "Eucalyptus" "New Arms", and "Winter Windows"; drums on "Ring Song", "Seaside Haiku", "Signal", "New Arms", "Time WIll Show You", and "Winter Windows"; piano on "Ring Song" and "Komorebi"; bells on "Naked Hymn"; percussion on "Naked Hymn", "Signal", "Eucalyptus", and "Time Will Show You"; synthesizer on "Naked Hymn", "Signal"; electric guitar on "My Lantern" and "New Arms"; beats on "Eucalyptus"; production
- Kendra Lynn – engineering on "Ring Song", "Seaside Haiku", "My Lantern", "Signal", "Can't Help But Sing", "New Arms", "Time Will Show You", "T & O", "Komorebi", and "Winter Windows"
- Aaron Roche – trombone on "Autumn Song" and "Komorebi", trumpet on "Komorebi", guitar on "Komorebi", synthesizer on "Komorebi", piano on "Komorebi"
- Kate Stables – backing vocals on "Autumn Song"
- Indigo Street – electric guitar feedback on "Winter Windows"
- Phil Weinrobe – mixing

== See also ==
- Lists of 2022 albums
