= 3 Rounds and a Sound =

Studio album by Blind Pilot
- Released: July 15, 2008
- Genres: Indie rock, Indie folk
- Length: 40:40
- Label: Expunged
- Producer: Blind Pilot

Blind Pilot chronology
3 Rounds and a Sound (2008)	We Are the Tide (2011)

Professional ratings
Review scores
Source	Rating
Allmusic	3.5/5 stars

3 Rounds and a Sound is the debut CD from the Portland, Oregon indie band Blind Pilot. The band released the CD on July 15, 2008 on Expunged Records. "Go On, Say It", was chosen to be a Single of the Week on July 7, 2008 on Apple Inc.'s iTunes Store. Since 2008, they have released three albums and one EP.

== Track listing ==
All tracks are written by Nebeker, except where noted.

No.	Title	Length
1.	"Oviedo"	3:50
2.	"The Story I Heard" (Nebeker/Dobrowski)	4:31
3.	"Paint or Pollen"	3:35
4.	"Poor Boy"	4:04
5.	"One Red Thread"	4:29
6.	"Go On, Say It" (Nebeker/Dobrowski)	3:19
7.	"Two Towns from Me"	2:55
8.	"I Buried a Bone"	2:37
9.	"Things I Cannot Recall"	3:15
10.	"The Bitter End"	3:20
11.	"3 Rounds and a Sound"	4:27

== Personnel ==
- Israel Nebeker – vocals, guitar, bass
- Ryan Dobrowski – drums, percussion
- Luke Ydstie – upright bass
- Kati Claborn – vocals, mountain dulcimer, banjo
- Shawn McLain – violin
- Ian Krist – vibraphone
- Dave Jorgensen – trumpet, rhodes
- Skyler Norwood – vibraphone, bass, orchestration

== Origin of Album/Song title ==
The album and title track "3 Rounds and a Sound" is often mistakenly attributed to the military funeral tradition of Three-volley salut and Taps.

During an August 3, 2009 interview with LAist, Israel described how the title track came about.

Why did you name the album 3 Rounds and a Sound? Three rounds of what exactly? Boxing? Whiskey?
Yeah, it struck me as a funny phrase when I heard it. It alluded to a lot of meanings. I liked that. It made me think of rounds of a song like in "Row Row Row Your Boat." The expression is actually a traditional Chinese phrase, which I thought was apt because of the importance of the bicycle in China. People rely very heavily on them. The expression is something you say to a newly wed couple. They represent the necessities you need in life: a round bike wheel, a round clock face, a round spool of thread and the sound is radio. You need to have all of these essential needs met in order to get married.

This piece of information possibly come about from Bicycling magazine:

The bike is so ingrained in Chinese culture that it remains part of an important tradition known as san zhuan yi xiang, or "three rounds and a sound." The term refers to the four items a husband traditionally supplied to his bride: The "rounds" are the face of a watch, the spindle of a sewing machine and the wheels of a bicycle, and the "sound" represents a transistor radio. "With these," Zhao says, "you'd start a life together."

San Zhuang Yi Xiang [zh: 三转一响], is a commonly used Chinese idiom in reference to objects of great desire during 1950-1970 before China's economy greatly improves in the 90's. Although the objects referenced are updated in different era, the original reference, as used by Blind Pilot, are:

1. Sewing Machine - "Flying Man" or "Panda" brand
2. Bicycle - "Phoenix", "Eternal", or "Flying Pigeon" brand
3. Watch - "Shanghai" brand
4. Radio - "Red Light", or "Red Star" brand
