= Joker's Daughter (band) =

Greek-English band

Joker's Daughter was originally a musical collaboration between Greek-English singer/songwriter Helena Costas and producer Danger Mouse who released their debut album The Last Laugh in 2009. Helena Costas was backed by The Bullfrogs in 2014 but has since released several solo EPs and an album, keeping her artist name as Joker's Daughter.

== History ==
Born in London but Greek Cypriot by origin, Helena Costas studied violin from ages 7 to 13, then taught herself guitar and keyboards. As she became an adult, her mission came into focus. She wrote songs, and studied music production, and played gigs around London.

Costas first began working with Danger Mouse in 2003, after sending him some home demos. Trey Reames, DM's Manager at the time, saw her playing at an open mic at Yo! Sushi in London.

Joker's Daughter's debut album The Last Laugh appeared on Team Love Records in 2009, and Double Six Records and features Scott Spillane (of Neutral Milk Hotel) on brass instruments. Their debut, The Last Laugh, features Josh Klinghoffer and Steven Nistor. Singles included "Worm's Head" and "Lucid".

Going solo, Helena released May Cause Side Effects, which included production on 2 songs ("Mind of Gold" and "Bubbles") by Mike Lindsay of Tung. The single "Mind of Gold" was released on 3 October 2011, and includes the B-side tracks, "Handful of Nothing" and a cover of the Iron Maiden song "Infinite Dreams".

The album May Cause Side Effects was released on 7 November 2011. The later EP Hybrid included recordings with Helena’s band The Bullfrogs. Since 2017 Helena has created several solo EPs, which have included some additional instruments and production by her brother John Costas on 'Portal', ' Abstract', and 'The In-Between.' The EP Abstract was released in March 2025 by Team Love Records. Their ninth album, The In-Between, was released by Team Love Records on October 23, 2026.

== Discography ==
- The Last Laugh (Team Love Records, Double Six Records 2009)
- May Cause Side Effects (2011)
- Hybrid (2014)
- Pulling Faces (2017)
- Heroes (2019)
- Magical Negligence (2020)
- Portal (2023)
- Abstract (2025)
- The In-Between (2026)
