= The Last Laugh (Joker's Daughter album) =

Studio album by Joker's Daughter
- Released: April 7, 2009
- Labels: Double Six; Team Love
- Producer: Danger Mouse

Joker's Daughter chronology
The Last Laugh (2009)	May Cause Side Effects (2011)

The Last Laugh is the debut full-length studio album by the UK-based band Joker's Daughter. It was released on April 7, 2009 via Double Six Recordings and Team Love Records. Production was handled by Danger Mouse.

== Critical reception ==
Professional ratings
Aggregate scores
Source	Rating
AnyDecentMusic?	6.9/10
Metacritic	72/100
Review scores
Source	Rating
AllMusic	4/5 stars
Drowned in Sound	7/10
God Is in the TV	4.5/5
musicOMH	4/5 stars
NME	2/5 stars
Pitchfork	7.3/10
Rolling Stone	3/5 stars
Spectrum Culture	2.5/5
Spin	7/10 marks
Tiny Mix Tapes	2/5 marks

The Last Laugh was met with generally favourable reviews from music critics. At Metacritic, which assigns a normalized rating out of 100 to reviews from mainstream publications, the album received an average score of 72, based on fourteen reviews. The aggregator AnyDecentMusic? has the critical consensus of the album at a 6.9 out of 10, based on five reviews.

== Track listing ==
All tracks are written by Helena Costas and Brian Burton, except track 2 is written with Panayiota Costas.

No.	Title	Length
1.	"Worm's Head"	2:05
2.	"Jessie the Goat"	2:54
3.	"Go Walking"	3:44
4.	"Lucid"	3:45
5.	"JD Folk Blues"	1:40
6.	"The Last Laugh"	2:08
7.	"Under the Influence of Jaffa Cakes"	2:18
8.	"Jelly Belly"	2:05
9.	"Cake and July"	3:04
10.	"Chasing Ticking Crocodile"	3:16
11.	"Nothing Is Ever What It Seems"	3:44
12.	"The Running Goblin"	3:18
13.	"The Bull Bites Back"	2:45
14.	"Yellow Teapot"	3:49
