= Troubled by the Fire =

Studio album by Laura Veirs
- Released: March 4, 2003
- Genre: Folk
- Length: 44:00
- Label: Bella Union
- Producer: Tucker Martine

Laura Veirs chronology
The Triumphs and Travails of Orphan Mae (2001)	Troubled by the Fire (2003)	Carbon Glacier (2004)

Professional ratings
Review scores
Source	Rating
AllMusic	4/5 stars
Pitchfork Media	7.1/10

Troubled by the Fire is the third studio album by Laura Veirs, released in 2003.

== Track listing ==
1. "Lost at Seaflower Cove" – 3:39
2. "Bedroom Eyes" – 4:16
3. "The Ballad of John Vogelin" – 2:41
4. "Song My Friends Taught Me" – 4:32
5. "Cannon Fodder" – 5:51
6. "Tom Skookum Road" – 2:27
7. "Tiger Tattoos" – 5:27
8. "A Shining Lamp" – 1:27
9. "Ohio Clouds" – 3:58
10. "Devils' Hootenanny" – 5:03
11. "Midnight Singer" – 4:39
