= Year of Meteors =

Studio album by Laura Veirs
- Released: August 23, 2005
- Recorded: Flora, Seattle, Washington
- Genre: Folk
- Length: 47:34
- Label: Nonesuch Records
- Producer: Tucker Martine

Laura Veirs chronology
| Carbon Glacier (2004) | Year of Meteors (2005) | Saltbreakers (2007) |

Professional ratings
Aggregate scores
| Source | Rating |
|---|---|
| Metacritic | 80/100 |
Review scores
| Source | Rating |
| AllMusic | 4/5 stars |
| Entertainment Weekly | B+ |
| The Independent | 5/5 stars |
| Mojo | 4/5 stars |
| NME | 7/10 |
| Now | 4/5 stars |
| Pitchfork | 7.9/10 |
| Q | 4/5 stars |
| Rolling Stone | 3/5 stars |
| Uncut | 8/10 |

Year of Meteors is the fifth studio album by Laura Veirs, released in 2005. On August 7, 2018, it was announced that this album, along with the rest of her releases through Nonesuch would be reissued for the first time in over ten years on both compact disc and vinyl by Veirs' own record label, Raven Marching Band.

== Track listing ==
1. "Fire Snakes" – 4:57
2. "Galaxies" – 3:35
3. "Secret Someones" – 5:16
4. "Magnetized" – 2:37
5. "Parisian Dream" – 3:05
6. "Rialto" – 4:00
7. "Through the Glow" – 2:42
8. "Cool Water" – 2:52
9. "Spelunking" – 3:06
10. "Black Gold Blues" – 3:11
11. "Where Gravity Is Dead" – 3:40
12. "Lake Swimming" – 3:24
  - "Magnetized" (Demo version) (hidden track) – 1:39

== Personnel ==
The Tortured Souls

- Laura Veirs – vocals, guitar, keyboards
- Steve Moore – piano, organs, keyboards
- Karl Blau – bass, electric guitar, vocals, keyboards
- Tucker Martine – drums, beats, percussion

Special guests

- Eyvind Kang – viola on tracks 1, 5, 10
- Keith Lowe – upright bass on tracks 1, 6
