= Farmer Not So John =

Farmer Not So John was a popular music group based in Nashville, Tennessee, that was often categorized as alternative country. With members Mack Linebaugh, Brian Ray, Sean Keith and Richard McLaurin, the band released two recordings on Compass Records.

== Members ==
- Mack Linebaugh (a.k.a. Mack Starks) (vocals, guitar)
- Brian Ray (bass)
- Richard McLaurin (guitar)
- Sean R. Keith (drums)

== Discography ==
- Farmer Not So John (1997)
- Receiver (1998)
