= Tumble Bee =

Studio album by Laura Veirs
- Released: November 8, 2011
- Recorded: 2011
- Genre: Folk
- Length: 30:37
- Labels: Nonesuch (US); Bella Union (UK)
- Producer: Tucker Martine

Laura Veirs chronology
July Flame (2010)	Tumble Bee (2011)	Warp and Weft (2013)

Professional ratings
Review scores
Source	Rating
AllMusic	3.5/5 stars
Pitchfork	7.5/10

Tumble Bee is the eighth studio album by Laura Veirs, released in 2011. The album contains folk songs for children.

== Track listing ==
Tumble Bee track listing
No.	Title	Writer(s)	Length
1.	"Little Lap Dog Lullaby"	Traditional	2:05
2.	"Prairie Lullaby"	Billy Hill	3:42
3.	"Jack Can I Ride?"	Traditional	1:56
4.	"Tumblebee"	Karl Blau	2:35
5.	"King Kong Kitchie Kitchie Ki-Me-O"	Traditional	2:58
6.	"All the Pretty Little Horses"	Traditional	2:16
7.	"The Fox"	Traditional	2:14
8.	"Jump Down Spin Around"	Harry Belafonte	1:51
9.	"Why Oh Why"	Woody Guthrie	3:30
10.	"Down in the Medder"	Laura Veirs & Karl Blau	0:31
11.	"Soldier's Joy"	Jimmy Driftwood	2:48
12.	"Jamaica Farewell"	Lord Burgess	2:50
13.	"Prairie Dream"	Rob Burger	1:21

== Charts ==
Chart performance of Tumble Bee
Chart (2011)	Peak position
US Heatseekers Albums (Billboard)	26
