= Phone Orphans =

Studio album by Laura Veirs
- Released: November 3, 2023
- Length: 35:00
- Label: Raven Marching Band
- Producer: Laura Veirs

Laura Veirs chronology
Found Light (2022)	Phone Orphans (2023)	Temple Songs (2026)

Singles from Phone Orphans
- 1. "Rocks of Time" Released: September 18, 2023

Phone Orphans is the thirteenth studio album by American singer-songwriter Laura Veirs, released on November 3, 2023, through Raven Marching Band. Veirs recorded the album as demos on her phone. It received acclaim from critics.

== Background ==
Veirs recorded the album using a voice memo app on her phone, making the album a collection of "first-take demos".

On September 18, 2023, Laura announced the release of her thirteenth studio album, along with the first single "Rocks of Time".

== Critical reception ==
Professional ratings
Aggregate scores
Source	Rating
Metacritic	79/100
Review scores
Source	Rating
Mojo	4/5 stars
PopMatters	7/10
Slant Magazine	4/5 stars
Uncut	8/10

Phone Orphans received a score of 79 out of 100 on review aggregator Metacritic based on five critics' reviews, indicating "generally favorable" reception. Uncut felt that "standouts such as 'Rocks of Time' and 'Next One, Maybe' have all the depth, richness and candour that Veirs' admirers have come to expect", while Mojo remarked that the tracks are "spare but complete, as rich as old letters or photographs". PopMatters' Steve Horowitz stated that the album "works because of its roughness" as "Veirs offers her direct sensibility as a way to address her ignorance. She doesn't know the meaning of life any more than the rest of us. She has given the question serious thought and created art from the possibilities by singing, playing, and recording over the telephone late at night". Eric Mason of Slant Magazine opined that Phone Orphans' "acoustic arrangements, which consist mostly of guitar and conversational vocals, are delicate and bright, but its sparse instrumentation makes Veirs's preoccupation with death all the more unavoidable".

== Track listing ==
All tracks are written by Laura Veirs, except where noted.

Phone Orphans track listing
No.	Title	Length
1.	"Creatures of a Day"	2:16
2.	"If You Could Hold Someone"	3:16
3.	"Rocks of Time"	2:23
4.	"Tree Climber"	2:36
5.	"Up Is a Nice Place to Be" (Rosalie Sorrels)	2:14
6.	"The Archers" (Veirs, Federico García Lorca)	3:26
7.	"Tiger Ocean"	1:16
8.	"Smoke Song"	3:31
9.	"Valentine"	2:59
10.	"Magnolia Sphere"	2:22
11.	"Swan Dive"	2:26
12.	"Next One, Maybe"	1:49
13.	"Piano Improv"	1:47
14.	"Beautiful Dreams"	2:39
Total length:		35:00
