= Black Prairie =

American americana band

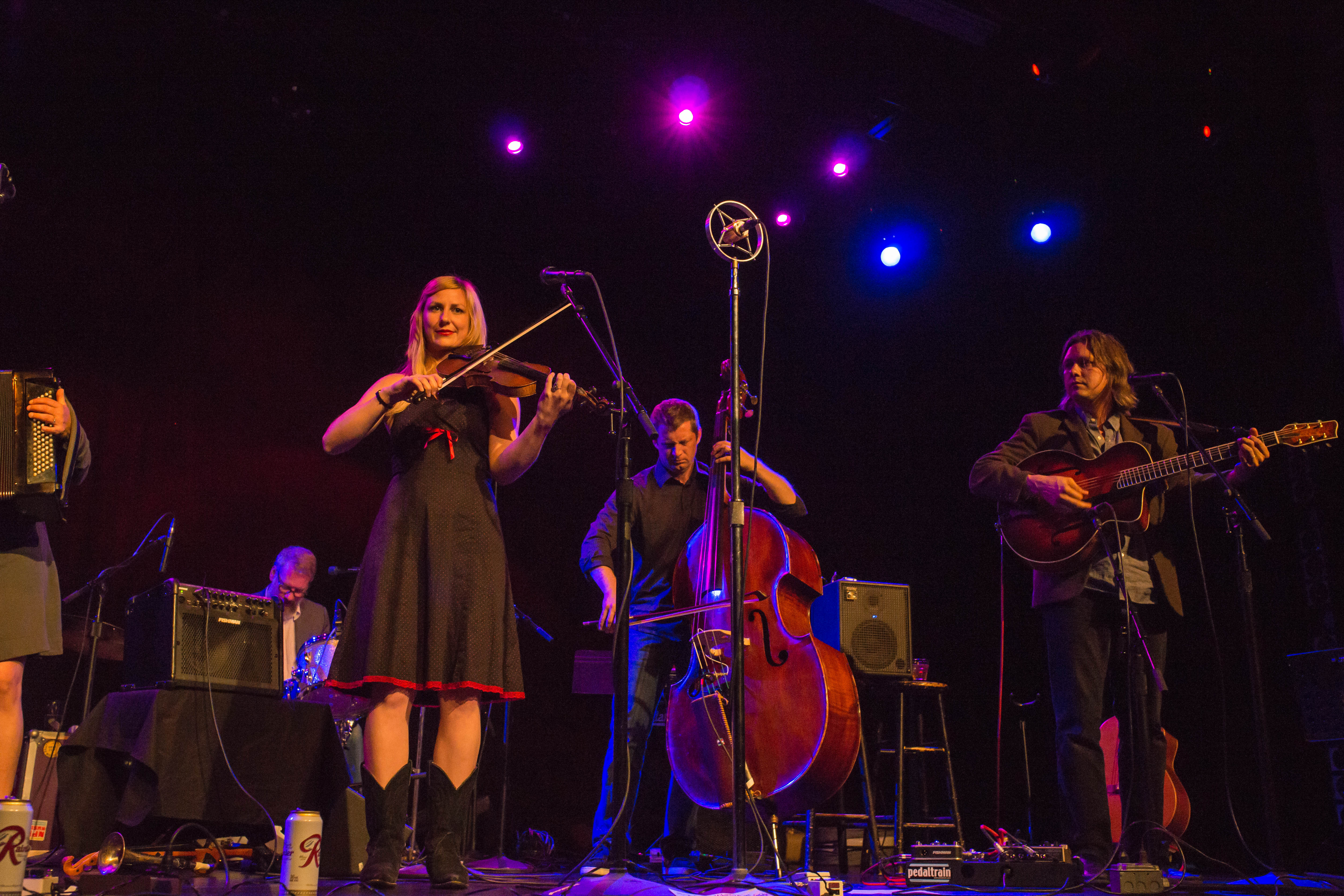
- Black Prairie in 2013

Background information
- Origin: Portland, Oregon, United States
- Genre: Americana
- Years active: 2007–c2018
- Label: Sugar Hill
- Members: Chris Funk; Nate Query; Jenny Conlee; John Moen; Annalisa Tornfelt; Jon Neufeld

Black Prairie is a six-piece string band from Portland, Oregon. The band formed in early 2007. Their first album, Feast of the Hunter's Moon, was released on April 6, 2010, on the Sugar Hill label.

== History ==
The band began when The Decemberists' Chris Funk (dobro) and Nate Query (bass) had some time off from touring and decided to put together a side project. Other members of the band include The Decemberists' accordion player Jenny Conlee and drummer John Moen, singer and violinist Annalisa Tornfelt of Bearfoot and The Woolwines, and guitarist Jon Neufeld of Dolorean and Jackstraw.

The band performed at the South by Southwest festival in March 2010, Oregon's Pickathon Festival in August 2010, and toured in October 2010.

The band has been inactive since about 2018.

== Influences ==
Their musical influences include bluegrass, klezmer, jazz, tango, and Romanian music resulting in a unique sound. Chris Funk says Black Prairie's sound "bridges the music of Clarence White and Ennio Morricone".

== Discography ==
=== Albums ===
Title	Details	Peak positions
Title	Details	US Bluegrass
Feast of the Hunter's Moon	Release date: April 13, 2010; Label: Sugar Hill Records	4
The Storm in the Barn	Release date: April 24, 2012; Label: self-released	—
A Tear in the Eye Is a Wound in the Heart	Release date: September 18, 2012; Label: Sugar Hill Records	4
Wild Ones	Release date: May 14, 2013; Label: Captain Bluegrass	—
Fortune	Release date: April 22, 2014; Label: Sugar Hill Records	—
"—" denotes releases that did not chart

=== Music videos ===
Year	Video	Director
2012	"Nowhere, Massachusetts"	Jason Roark
2014	"Let It Out"	Jason Roark
