= We Are the Tide =

Studio album by Blind Pilot
- Released: September 13, 2011
- Genre: Indie rock
- Length: 38:05
- Label: Expunged
- Producer: Blind Pilot

Blind Pilot chronology
3 Rounds and a Sound (2008)	We Are the Tide (2011)	And Then Like Lions

We Are the Tide is the second studio album from the Portland, Oregon indie group Blind Pilot. The album was released on September 13, 2011.

== Reception ==
Andrew Leahey of AllMusic gave the album positive review, rating it 4.5 out of 5. He judge the tracks in the album "near faultless", setting "a new benchmark in the Oregon/Washington folk-pop revival."

The album debuted at No. 56 on Billboard 200, No. 19 on Top Rock Albums, and No. 2 on Folk Albums, selling around 8,000 in the first week. The album has sold 65,000 copies in the United States as of July 2016.

== Track listing ==
No.	Title	Length
1.	"Half Moon"	3:28
2.	"Always"	2:26
3.	"Keep You Right"	3:35
4.	"We Are the Tide"	3:17
5.	"The Colored Night"	3:55
6.	"I Know"	3:52
7.	"White Apple"	3:56
8.	"Just One"	4:29
9.	"Get It Out"	3:25
10.	"New York"	5:39

== Personnel ==
- Israel Nebeker – singing, guitar, ukulele, harmonium
- Ryan Dobrowski – drums, percussion
- Luke Ydstie – bass, piano, guitar, pump organ, singing
- Kati Claborn – banjo, dulcimer, ukulele, guitar, singing
- Dave Jorgensen – trumpet, harmonium, Hammond B3, Rhodes, piano, pump organ
- Ian Krist – vibraphone
- Nathan Crockett – violin
- Joel Meredith – pedal steel

== Charts ==
Chart (2011)	Peak position
US Billboard 200	56
US Top Alternative Albums (Billboard)	10
US Folk Albums (Billboard)	2
US Independent Albums (Billboard)	14
US Top Rock Albums (Billboard)	19
US Vinyl Albums (Billboard)	11
