= July Flame =

Studio album by Laura Veirs
- Released: January 12, 2010
- Genres: Folk; indie rock; chamber folk
- Length: 43:58
- Labels: Raven Marching Band; Bella Union
- Producer: Tucker Martine

Laura Veirs chronology
Saltbreakers (2007)	July Flame (2010)	Tumble Bee (2011)

July Flame is the seventh studio album by American singer-songwriter Laura Veirs, released on January 12, 2010.

The title comes from a type of peach Veirs saw at a farmer's market. Jim James of American rock band My Morning Jacket contributes falsetto harmonies on several tracks, including "Carol Kaye" which is a tribute to the so named bass guitarist.

== Reception ==
Professional ratings
Aggregate scores
Source	Rating
Metacritic	81/100
Review scores
Source	Rating
AllMusic	3.5/5 stars
Entertainment Weekly	A−
The Guardian	4/5 stars
Mojo	4/5 stars
MusicOMH	4/5 stars
Paste	8.5/10
Pitchfork	7.5/10
PopMatters	9/10
Q	4/5 stars
Uncut	4/5 stars

Reviews of July Flame were favorable. The Independent called it an "obliquely beautiful record, as they tend to be. Poetic and simple". The New York Times said it is "full of layered folk and indie-rock bucolia and plain-spoken but stretchy-thinking language" and "there are some great, seemingly unforced, séancelike moments here". The Guardian praised the album as "so extravagantly beautiful that it will send you scurrying back to its predecessors". Entertainment Weekly wrote that the album "sends us on hikes through dreamy landscapes evoked by her uniquely tangy voice, casting minimal instrumentation in glistening arrangements to captivate the melancholy imagination." Paste proclaimed that the album is Veirs' "finest work", and said "It's hard to imagine a better soundtrack to the chilly months than this collection of heady, steady, pensive songs".

== Track listing ==
All tracks written by Laura Veirs

1. "I Can See Your Tracks" – 2:58
2. "July Flame" – 3:45
3. "Sun Is King" – 3:20
4. "Where Are You Driving?" – 2:53
5. "Life Is Good Blues" – 2:35
6. "Silo Song" – 2:39
7. "Little Deschutes" – 4:06
8. "Summer Is the Champion" – 4:25
9. "When You Give Your Heart" – 3:05
10. "Sleeper in the Valley" – 4:02
11. "Wide-Eyed, Legless" – 2:35
12. "Carol Kaye" – 3:20
13. "Make Something Good" – 4:14

== Personnel ==
- Laura Veirs – lead vocals, guitars, banjo, piano, bass guitar
- Tucker Martine – drums, percussion, piano and backing vocals (tracks 1–3, 5–6, 8, 10)
- Karl Blau – bass guitar, piano, strings, electric guitar, organ, saxophone and backing vocals (tracks 2–8, 12–13)
- Jon Neufeld – guitars and backing vocals (tracks 1–3, 5–6, 9, 10, 12)

=== Guest musicians ===
- Chris Funk – pedal steel guitar, twelve-string guitar, autoharp and mandolin (tracks 3, 8 and 9)
- Jim James – vocals (tracks 1, 3, 6 and 12)
- Eyvind Kang – viola (tracks 2, 4, 6, 9 and 11)
- Scott Magee – bass clarinet (track 11)
- Steve Moore – piano and electric piano, lowry organ, synths, loops and bells (tracks 4, 8, 10 and 11)
- Victor Nash – vibraphone, trumpet (tracks 3 and 8)
- Nate Query – upright bass (track 11)
- Annalisa Tornfelt – backing vocals (tracks 2 and 13)
- John McDonald – backing vocals (track 2)
- Mac Martine – backing vocals (track 2)
- Sarah Dougher – backing vocals (track 2)
- Shannon Sneed – backing vocals (track 2)

== Charts ==
Chart performance of July Flame
Chart (2010)	Peak position
US Billboard 200	124
US Americana/Folk Albums (Billboard)	1
US Independent Albums (Billboard)	14
