= Case/lang/veirs (album) =

case/lang/veirs

Studio album by case/lang/veirs
- Released: June 17, 2016
- Recorded: November 2015
- Genre: Folk rock
- Length: 43:13
- Producer: Tucker Martine

Neko Case chronology
The Worse Things Get, the Harder I Fight, the Harder I Fight, the More I Love You (2013)	case/lang/veirs (2016)	Hell-On (2018)

k.d. lang chronology
Sing It Loud (2011)	case/lang/veirs (2016)	Makeover (2021)

Laura Veirs chronology
Warp & Weft (2013)	case/lang/veirs (2016)	The Lookout (2018)

case/lang/veirs is the self-titled debut album by Canadian-American supergroup case/lang/veirs which consists of Neko Case, k.d. lang, and Laura Veirs. The album was recorded in November 2015 and released June 17, 2016.

== Reception ==
Professional ratings
Aggregate scores
Source	Rating
AnyDecentMusic?	7.8/10
Metacritic	83/100
Review scores
Source	Rating
AllMusic	3.5/5 stars
American Songwriter	4.5/5 stars
Chicago Tribune	3/4 stars
The Guardian	4/5 stars
The Independent	4/5 stars
Mojo	4/5 stars
The Observer	4/5 stars
Pitchfork	8.2/10
Q	4/5 stars
Spin	8/10

The group's self-titled debut album received "ecstatic reviews". Pitchfork reviewer Laura Snapes noted its strong musicianship and use of natural imagery. Snapes acknowledged comparisons to the 1987 album Trio from Dolly Parton, Linda Ronstadt, and Emmylou Harris, but said that unlike Trio it was unlikely to be followed up with a second album, and lang herself called it a "one-off record". Writing for Exclaim!, Sarah Greene lauded the album, calling it "profound, passionate and substantial." Andy Gill at The Independent called it "an album of rare beauty and intelligence" also noting "elemental reflections" in some of the lyrics. Production by Tucker Martine, Veirs's then-spouse, was lauded by Greg Kot of the Chicago Tribune as "[giving] each song exactly what it needs", also noting the singers attained an "organic feel to the union that would raise it above the usually mediocre (or worse) level of most such hey-let's-get-together-and-jam all-star collaborations". The song "Down I-5" contains a quote from a William Blake poem that was previously used by the Doors in their song "End of the Night": “Some are born to sweet delight, Some are born to endless night.”

== Track listing ==
1. "Atomic Number" (Laura Veirs/k.d. lang/Neko Case) – 2:58
2. "Honey and Smoke" (Veirs/lang) – 3:04
3. "Song for Judee" (Veirs) – 3:12
4. "Blue Fires" (Veirs/lang) – 2:58
5. "Delirium" (Veirs/lang/Case) – 2:46
6. "Greens of June" (Veirs) – 4:13
7. "Behind the Armory" (Veirs/lang/Case) – 2:20
8. "Best Kept Secret" (Veirs) – 3:17
9. "1000 Miles Away" (Veirs) – 2:57
10. "Supermoon" (Veirs/Case) – 3:48
11. "I Want to Be Here" (Veirs/lang/Case) – 2:47
12. "Down I-5" (Veirs/Case) – 3:02
13. "Why Do We Fight" (Veirs/lang) – 2:36
14. "Georgia Stars" (Veirs/lang) – 3:17

== Personnel ==
Musicians

- Rob Burger – keys, piano, claviola
- Neko Case – vocals
- Glenn Kotche – drums, percussion
- k.d. lang – vocals, acoustic guitar (13)
- Sebastian Steinberg – electric/upright bass, autoharp
- Laura Veirs – vocals, guitars
- Tim Young – lead/rhythm guitar

Guest musicians

- Ralph Carney – horns (8)
- Michael Finn – additional keys (1), additional guitar (4, 13)
- Jon Hyde – pedal steel (13)
- Tucker Martine – percussion, drums (13)
- Anna Fritz (cello), Kyleen King (viola), Patti King (violin) – strings (3, 4, 5, 8)
- Strings on 1, 6, 10 arranged by Stephen Barber and performed by Tosca String Quartet (Leigh Mahoney, Tracy Seeger, Ames Asbell, Sara Nelson)

== Charts ==
Chart performance for case/lang/veirs
Chart (2016)	Peak position
Australian Albums (ARIA)	12
Belgian Albums (Ultratop Flanders)	110
Irish Albums (IRMA)	83
Swiss Albums (Schweizer Hitparade)	66
UK Albums (Official Charts)	28
US Billboard 200	33
