= Laura Veirs (album) =

Studio album by Laura Veirs
- Released: 1999
- Genre: Folk
- Length: 34:53
- Label: Raven Marching Band

Laura Veirs chronology
| Laura Veirs (1999) | The Triumphs and Travails of Orphan Mae (2001) |

Professional ratings
Review scores
| Source | Rating |
|---|---|
| AllMusic | 2.5/5 stars |

Laura Veirs is the debut studio album by Laura Veirs, released in 1999. Unlike her later albums, this features only Veirs and her guitar and is noticeably less produced than her later work, having been recorded live in three hours rather than given an extensive studio process. This album is currently out of print, with only 1,000 copies pressed and Veirs later disavowing the music as bad.

== Track listing ==
1. "Green Cowgirl" – 2:53
2. "Dirty Sheep" – 2:21
3. "Blackbird Pie" – 1:54
4. "Tangerine" – 3:03
5. "Marianas Trench" – 3:12
6. "I Miss You" – 2:26
7. "Outside Bud's Jazz Records" – 2:57
8. "American Way" – 2:40
9. "Toe" – 1:41
10. "Look Out the Window" – 3:10
11. "Motorcycle Man" – 1:58
12. "Star Panties" – 3:01
13. "Hummingbird" – 3:38

== Charts ==
Chart performance of Laura Veirs
| Chart (2004) | Peak position |
|---|---|
| French Albums (SNEP) | 179 |
