= Sean Keith =

Sean Keith is a drummer, singer, songwriter, guitarist, and pastor at Lifegate Church in Omaha, Nebraska. His style has been compared to Chris Tomlin, Paul Baloche, Hillsong United, Gateway Worship, and Aaron Shust.

== Discography ==
- Control (2003)
- Back to You (2006)
- Dare to Imagine (2009)
- Brand New Day (2010)
- Your Victory Remains (2012)

== See also ==
- Farmer Not So John
