= Carbon Glacier (album) =

Studio album by Laura Veirs
- Released: August 24, 2004; October 12, 2018 (reissue)
- Genre: Folk
- Length: 39:20
- Label: Nonesuch Records (US); Bella Union (UK)
- Producer: Tucker Martine

Laura Veirs chronology
Troubled by the Fire (2003)	Carbon Glacier (2004)	Year of Meteors (2005)

Professional ratings
Review scores
Source	Rating
AllMusic	4.5/5 stars
Pitchfork Media	7.7/10

Carbon Glacier is the fourth studio album by Laura Veirs, released in 2004. The song "Rapture" was heard during the episode "Save Me", from the first season of Grey's Anatomy. On August 7, 2018, it was announced that this album, along with the rest of her releases through Nonesuch, would be reissued for the first time in over ten years on both compact disc and vinyl by Veirs' own record label, Raven Marching Band. Drawings by Jason Lutes after Rockwell Kent.

== Track listing ==
1. "Ether Sings" – 3:44
2. "Icebound Stream" – 3:04
3. "Rapture" – 3:06
4. "Lonely Angel Dust" – 2:38
5. "The Cloud Room" – 2:52
6. "Wind Is Blowing Stars" – 2:43
7. "Shadow Blues" – 4:20
8. "Anne Bonny Rag" – 2:15
9. "Snow Camping" – 3:12
10. "Chimney Sweeping Man" – 3:13
11. "Salvage a Smile" – 1:52
12. "Blackened Anchor" – 2:05
13. "Riptide" – 4:16

== See also ==
- Carbon Glacier
