= Laura Veirs =

American singer-songwriter

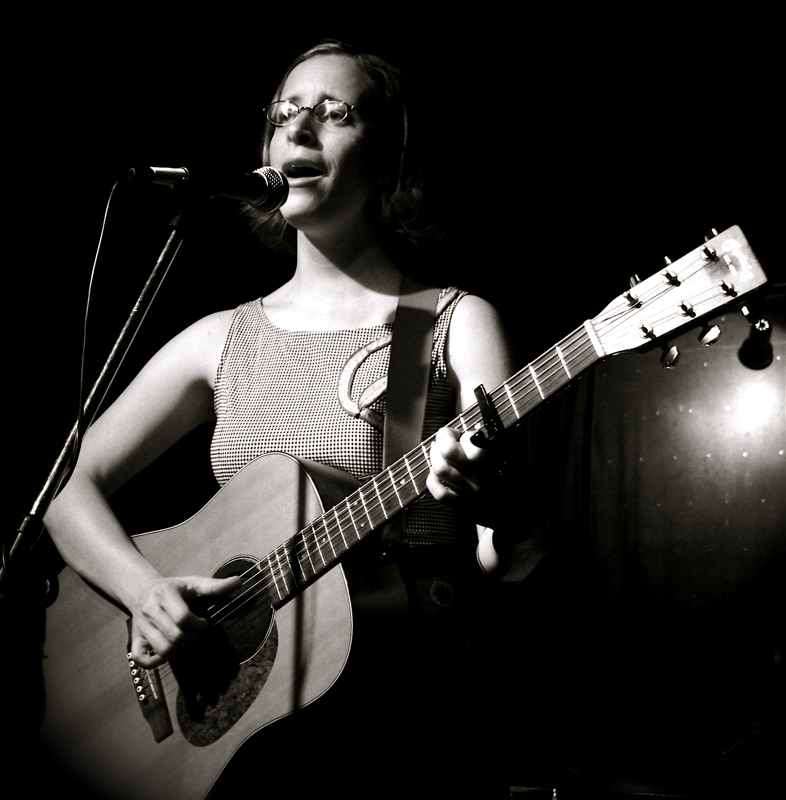
- Veirs performing at Walter's on Washington, Houston, 2007

Background information
- Born: Laura Pauline Veirs; October 24, 1973 (age 53); Colorado Springs, Colorado, U.S.
- Origin: Portland, Oregon, U.S.
- Genres: Folk; folk baroque
- Occupations: Singer; songwriter; composer; musician; writer
- Years active: 1999–present
- Labels: Raven Marching Band; Nonesuch; Bella Union; Kelp! Monthly
- Member of: case/lang/veirs
- Formerly of: Rair Kx!
- Website: lauraveirs.com

Laura Pauline Veirs (born October 24, 1973) is an American singer-songwriter based in Portland, Oregon. She is known for her folk and alternative country records and live performances as well as her collaboration with Neko Case and k.d. lang on the case/lang/veirs project. Veirs has written a children's book and hosts a podcast about parenting and performing.

== Early life and education ==
Veirs graduated from General William J. Palmer High School in Colorado Springs, Colorado.

In 1997, Veirs graduated from Carleton College, where she was a geology major and studied Mandarin Chinese. During this time, she worked as a translator for a geological expedition in China.

== Career ==
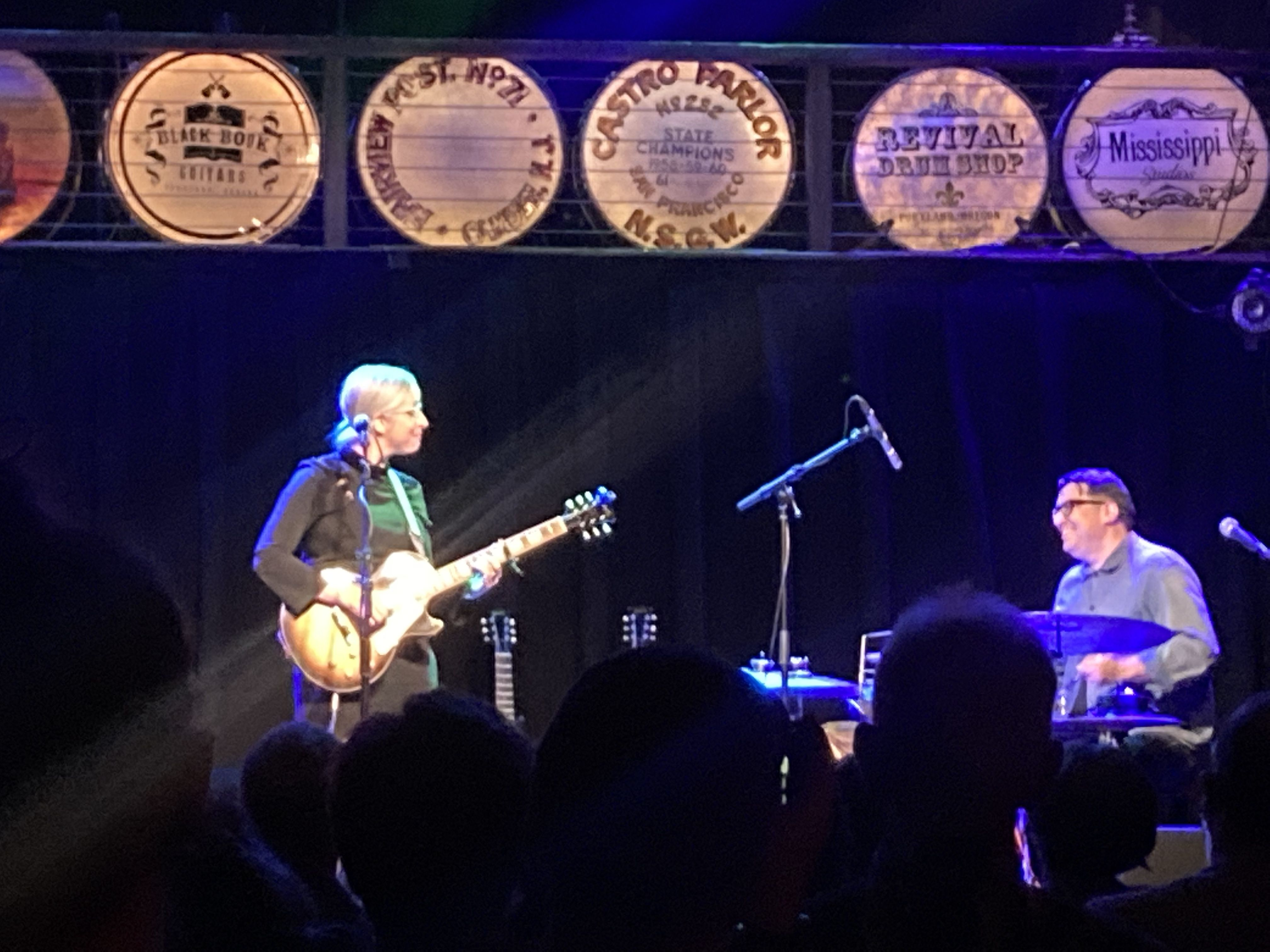
Veirs playing Mississippi Studios with José Medeles, 2022

Growing up, Veirs heard folk-country, classical, and pop music at home. However, according to herself, she did not "listen seriously," until she was in her twenties.

At Carleton, she joined all-girl punk band Rair Kx! After graduation, her taste moved to older country and folk, and during her time in China she began writing lyrics.

In 1999, Veirs released her eponymous debut studio album, which was recorded live and featuring just herself and guitar. 2003 saw the release of Troubled by the Fire, accompanied by veteran musicians such as Bill Frisell. She then signed to Nonesuch and released Carbon Glacier (2004). She also signed to Bella Union for European distribution. Year of Meteors followed in August 2005, and was selected by The New York Times as a "critic's choice".

Veirs released her final studio album for Nonesuch, Saltbreakers, in 2007.

In January 2010, Veirs released July Flame on her own Raven Marching Band Records. The album received praise from The Washington Post's Express tabloid, among other publications.

In November 2011, Veirs released the album Tumble Bee: Laura Veirs Sings Folk Songs for Children. The album presented mostly traditional songs, and featured an array of guest musicians, including Colin Meloy, Jim James and Béla Fleck. Tumble Bee won a Parents' Choice Award in 2012.

In September 2012, her first feature film soundtrack was released: Hello I Must Be Going, for the movie of the same name. The exclusive soundtrack featured eight instrumental versions of previously released songs, five catalog favorites and one new vocal track, "Spring Song".

In August 2013, she released Warp & Weft. In 2015, she worked on the album Carrie & Lowell by Sufjan Stevens. Veirs' long term collaborator and then husband, Tucker Martine, engineered some of the album.

Veirs was lead songwriter for the 2016 album case/lang/veirs, a collaborative project between Veirs, k.d. lang and Neko Case. The album received positive reviews and a Metacritic rating of 82.

In April 2018, she released her tenth studio album The Lookout on her own label Raven Marching Band in North American and Bella Union in the rest of the world. It was a concept album about the fragility of precious things. It featured contributions from Sufjan Stevens, Jim James and was produced by Tucker Martine. Earlier, in January 2018, she had launched a podcast, Midnight Lightning, about the lives of musician parents. The first season featured weekly interviews with 14 mother musicians such as Corin Tucker (Sleater-Kinney), Carol Kaye, Rosanne Cash, Rhiannon Giddens, Meshell Ndegeocello, Amanda Bergman among others. In early 2018, Chronicle Books published her first picture book, Libba: The Magnificent Musical Life of Elizabeth Cotten. A story about the influential American folk and blues musician Elizabeth Cotten (aka "Libba") it was illustrated by Tatyana Fazlalizadeh. Libba was a Junior Library Guild selection and received the Parents' Choice Award.

On Valentine's Day 2020, Veirs released the song "I Was a Fool", exploring her divorce. In July, her eleventh studio album My Echo was made available for pre-order with a scheduled release in October. Veirs continued to write and record, finishing most of an album's worth of material by the time, My Echo, was released. In 2022, Veirs co-produced her first studio album Found Light with Shahzad Ismaily.

Phone Orphans, an album of demos that Veirs recorded on her iPhone, was released in 2023. In the same year she recorded a live album at a show at Brooklyn's The Owl Parlor. It was released 2024, called Laura Veirs and Her Band – Live in Brooklyn. It featured her band mates Shahzad Ismaily, Sam Amidon, Karl Blau and Charlotte Greve. Veirs was inducted into the Oregon Music Hall of Fame in October, 2024.

Veirs' album Temple Songs was released in August 2026.

== Touring band members ==
- Laura Veirs – vocals, guitar, banjo
- Eli Moore – bass, guitar, synthesizers
- Eyvind Kang – viola
- Karl Blau – guitar, bass, saxophone, keyboards, vocals
- Steve Moore – piano, keyboards, bells, euphonium, vocals

=== Production ===
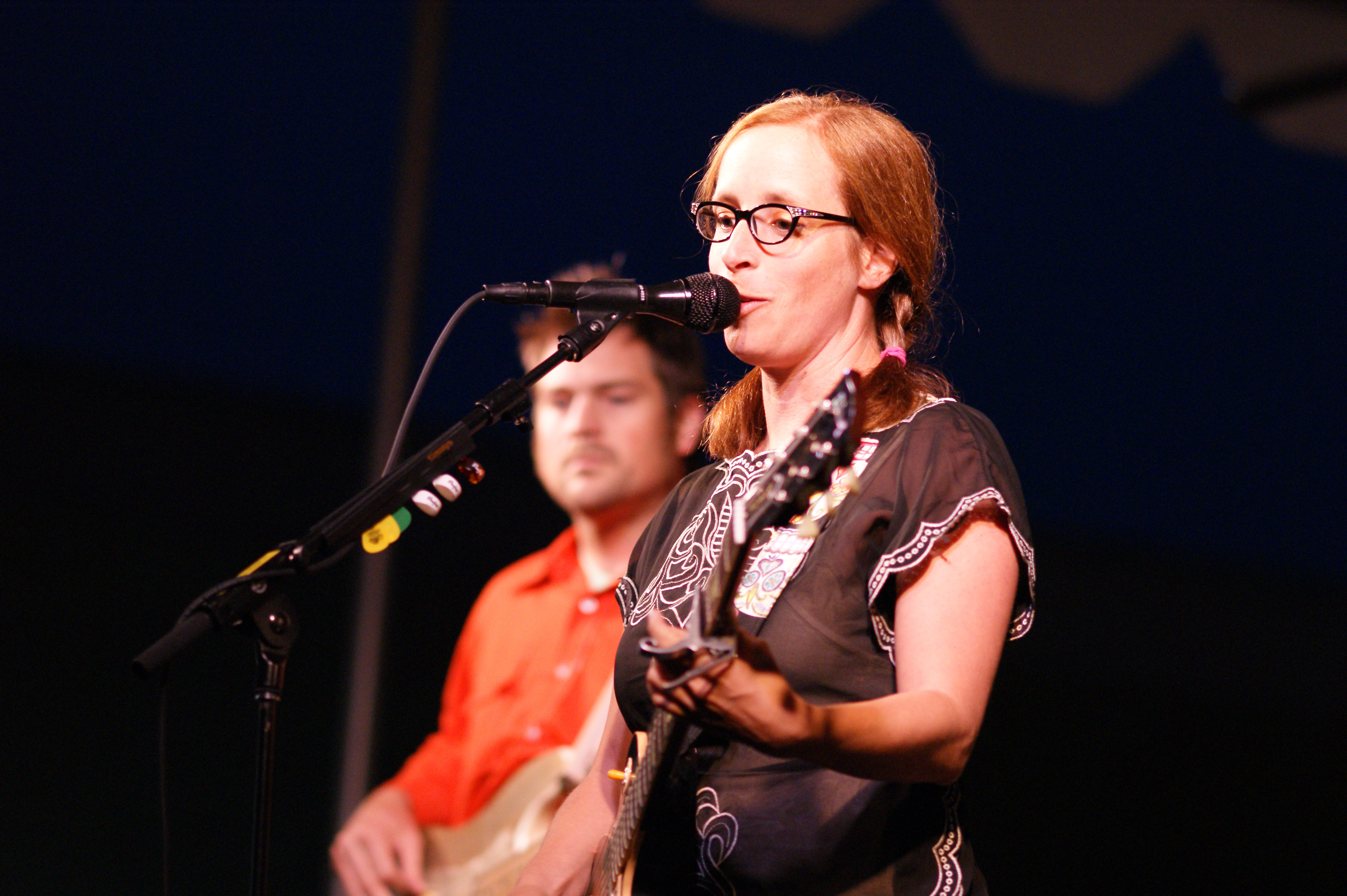
Veirs performing at Bumbershoot, 2010

Tucker Martine was a producer on many of the albums including Carbon Glacier, Year of Meteors, Saltbreakers, July Flame, Tumble Bee and Warp & Weft.

== Raven Marching Band Records ==
Veirs runs a record label, Raven Marching Band Records, that has released her own and other artists' music. In 2016, the label released Introducing Karl Blau, which was crowdfunded.

== Style ==
In 2007, Veirs said about her lyrics, "I like to be personal in my writing, but not overly confessional."

Many of her lyrics are inspired by literary works. The song "Saltbreakers" on her sixth studio album Saltbreakers (2007) was partially inspired by A. S. Byatt's Possession (1990). Another song on the same album, "Don't Lose Yourself", was partially inspired by José Saramago's novel, Blindness (1995). T. S. Eliot was an inspiration for the song "Margaret Sands" on The Lookout.

== Personal life ==
Veirs lives in Portland, Oregon. Around 2000, Veirs married Tucker Martine, who has collaborated with her musically. Veirs and Martine had two children, born 2010 and 2013. In November 2019, Veirs announced she and Martine were divorcing. In the summer of 2024, Veirs announced her engagement to Reed College music professor and ethnomusicologist Morgan Luker. Veirs and Luker married on June 28, 2025 in Portland, Oregon at Mississippi Studios.

== Discography ==
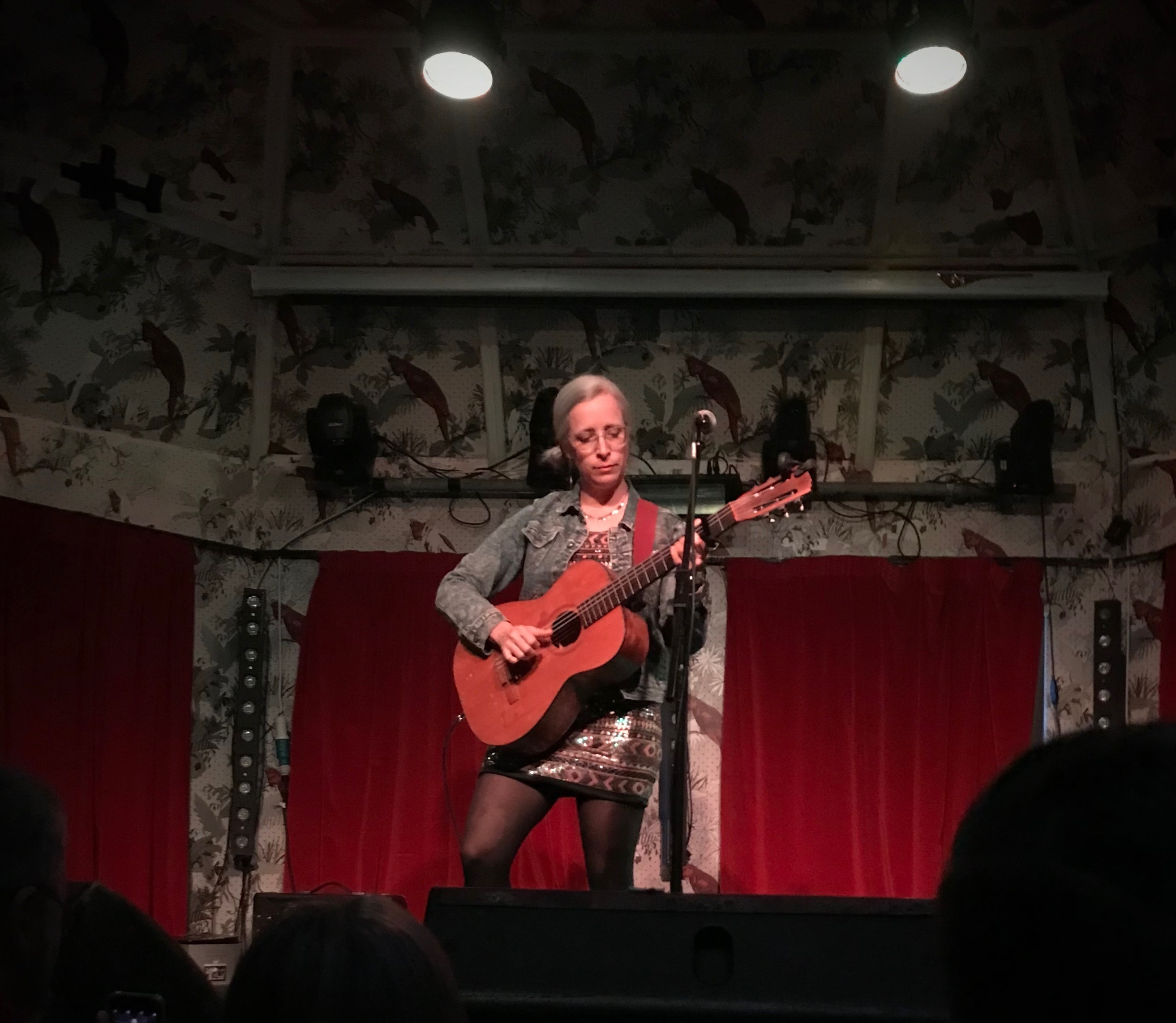
Veirs performing at the Deaf Institute in Manchester, England, 2022

Studio albums

- Laura Veirs (1999)
- The Triumphs and Travails of Orphan Mae (2001)
- Troubled by the Fire (2003)
- Carbon Glacier (2004)
- Year of Meteors (2005)
- Saltbreakers (2007)
- July Flame (2010)
- Tumble Bee (2011)
- Warp & Weft (2013)
- case/lang/veirs (2016) (with case/lang/veirs)
- The Lookout (2018)
- My Echo (2020)
- Found Light (2022)
- Phone Orphans (2023)
- Temple Songs (2026)

== Works and publications ==
- Veirs, Laura; Fazlalizadeh, Tatyana (illustrated by) (2018). Libba: The Magnificent Musical Life of Elizabeth Cotten. San Francisco, CA: Chronicle Books. ISBN 978-1-452-14858-8. OCLC 1001572148.
