= Warp & Weft =

Studio album by Laura Veirs
- Released: August 20, 2013
- Recorded: 2012–2013
- Genre: Folk
- Length: 42:31
- Label: Raven Marching Band
- Producer: Tucker Martine

Laura Veirs chronology
Tumble Bee (2011)	Warp & Weft (2013)	case/lang/veirs (2016)

Singles from Warp & Weft
- 1. "Sun Song" Released: August 6, 2013; 2. "America" Released: August 6, 2013

Professional ratings
Aggregate scores
Source	Rating
Metacritic	80/100
Review scores
Source	Rating
AllMusic	3.5/5 stars
Consequence of Sound	3.5/5 stars
The Independent	5/5 stars
The Line of Best Fit	4.5/5 stars
musicOMH	4/5 stars
PopMatters	4/5 stars
Slant Magazine	4.5/5 stars

Warp & Weft is the ninth studio album by American singer-songwriter Laura Veirs. Released on August 19, 2013, in the United States, and August 24, 2013, in Europe, the album was written by Veirs herself and produced by her husband Tucker Martine.

Released on Raven Marching Band Records in the US, and on Bella Union in Europe, ‘’Warp & Weft’’ is one of Veirs’ greatest commercial successes. It debuted at number 10 on the US Folk Albums chart and number 59 on the UK Albums Chart.

== Background and composition ==
On February 2, 2013, Laura Veirs announced on her official Facebook page that she was working on her next full-length record in her husband Tucker Martine's studio, and also specified she would work with "new and old friends". Several hours before, she had announced her pregnancy, saying the child would be born in April.

Teaming up with American singer-songwriter Neko Case for the first time, and with some members of The Decemberists, Veirs recorded the album in a basement studio, as she was still pregnant with her second child. Her pregnancy is an important theme in the album. Even though she does not directly deal with it in the songs, Veirs explained: "I'm haunted by the idea that something terrible could happen to my kids, but that fear pushes me to embrace the moment. This record is an exploration of extremes - deep, dark suffering and intense, compassionate love."

== Singles ==
Two weeks before the album release, "Sun Song", the opening track, was released on August 8, 2013. The song features Neko Case on backing vocals. Directed by Alexandra Spalding, the "Sun Song" video is an Instagram-type tribute to the sun, with a diorama of scenes in the countryside and pictures of Veirs playing guitar. The same week, "America" was also announced as a single.

== Track listing ==
Warp & Weft track listing
No.	Title	Length
1.	"Sun Song"	4:12
2.	"America"	4:13
3.	"Finster Saw the Angels"	3:00
4.	"Dorothy of the Island"	5:31
5.	"Shape Shifter"	3:06
6.	"Ghosts of Louisville"	0:29
7.	"Say Darlin' Say"	3:48
8.	"That Alice"	3:26
9.	"Ikaria"	1:29
10.	"Sadako Folding Cranes"	3:54
11.	"Ten Bridges"	3:53
12.	"White Cherry"	5:30
Total length:		42:31

== Charts ==
Chart performance of Warp & Weft
Chart (2013)	Peak position
UK Albums (OCC)	59
US Americana/Folk Albums (Billboard)	10
US Heatseekers Albums (Billboard)	13
US Indie Store Album Sales (Billboard)	22
