= Saltbreakers =

Studio album by Laura Veirs
- Released: March 17, 2007
- Genre: Folk
- Length: 48:02
- Label: Nonesuch

Laura Veirs chronology
Year of Meteors (2005)	Saltbreakers (2007)	Two Beers Veirs (2008)

Professional ratings
Aggregate scores
Source	Rating
Metacritic	78/100
Review scores
Source	Rating
AllMusic	4/5 stars
The Guardian	4/5 stars
Pitchfork	4.7/10

Saltbreakers is the sixth studio album by American singer-songwriter Laura Veirs.

The album was released in Europe and Australia on March 17, 2007, and in the U.S. on April 10, 2007. It was released on Nonesuch Records, who also released two previous Veirs albums, Carbon Glacier and Year of Meteors. On August 7, 2018, it was announced that this album, along with the rest of her releases through Nonesuch would be reissued for the first time in over ten years on both compact disc and vinyl by Veirs' own record label, Raven Marching Band.

== Track listing ==
1. "Pink Light" – 4:04
2. "Ocean Night Song" – 3:08
3. "Don't Lose Yourself" – 4:01
4. "Drink Deep" – 4:36
5. "Wandering Kind" – 3:32
6. "Nightingale" – 3:12
7. "Saltbreakers" – 3:20
8. "To the Country" – 5:09
9. "Cast a Hook in Me" – 3:20
10. "Phantom Mountain" – 3:14
11. "Black Butterfly" – 2:22
12. "Wrecking" – 3:49
13. "Bright Glittering Gifts" (iTunes bonus track) – 4:43

== Charts ==
Chart performance of Saltbreakers
Chart (2007)	Peak position
UK Albums (OCC)	96
