= Case/lang/veirs =

Canadian-American supergroup

case/lang/veirs
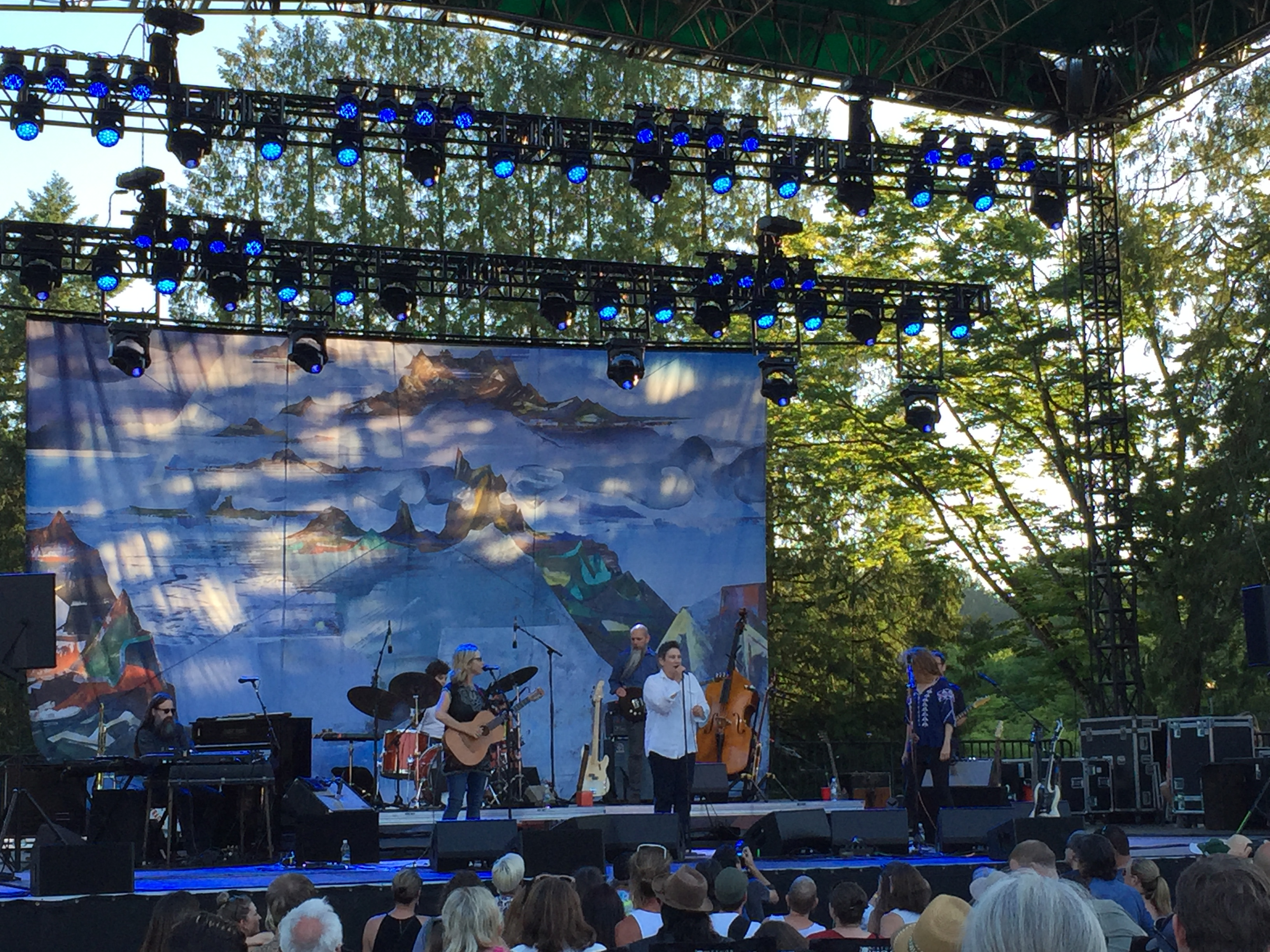
- case/lang/veirs at Oregon Zoo, July 2016

Background information
- Origin: Portland, Oregon U.S.
- Genres: Indie rock; power pop; post-punk revival
- Years active: 2016–present
- Label: Anti-
- Members: Neko Case; k.d. lang; Laura Veirs
- Website: caselangveirs.com (archived version)

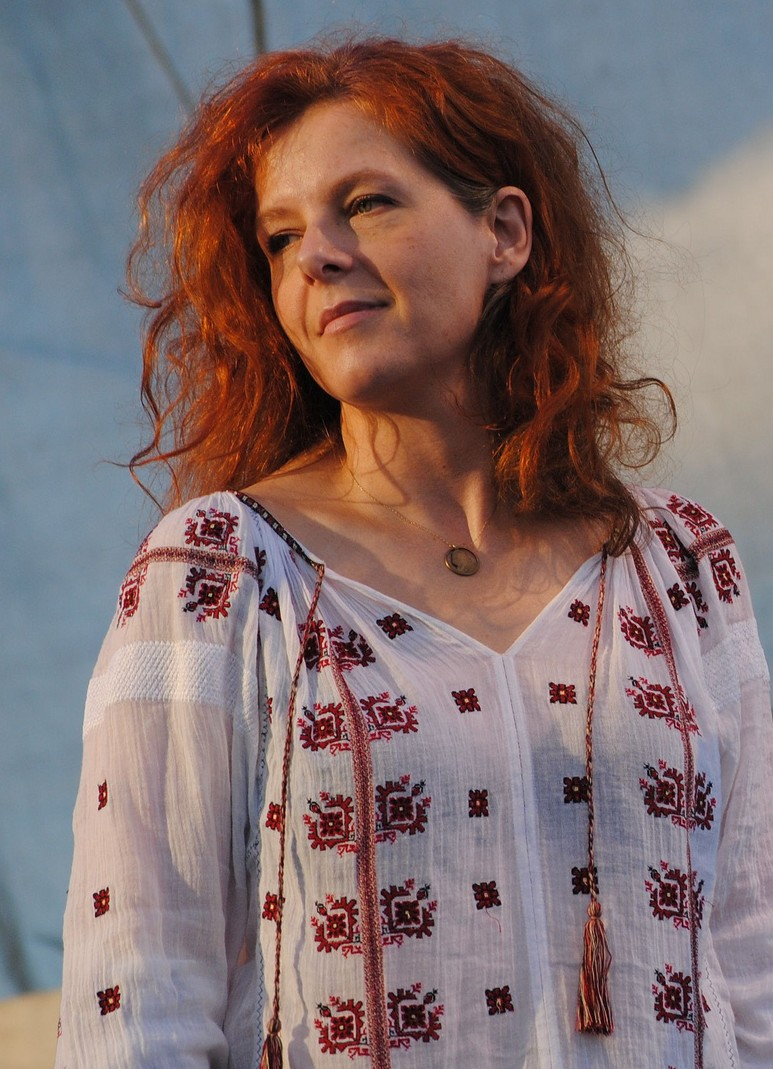
Neko Case

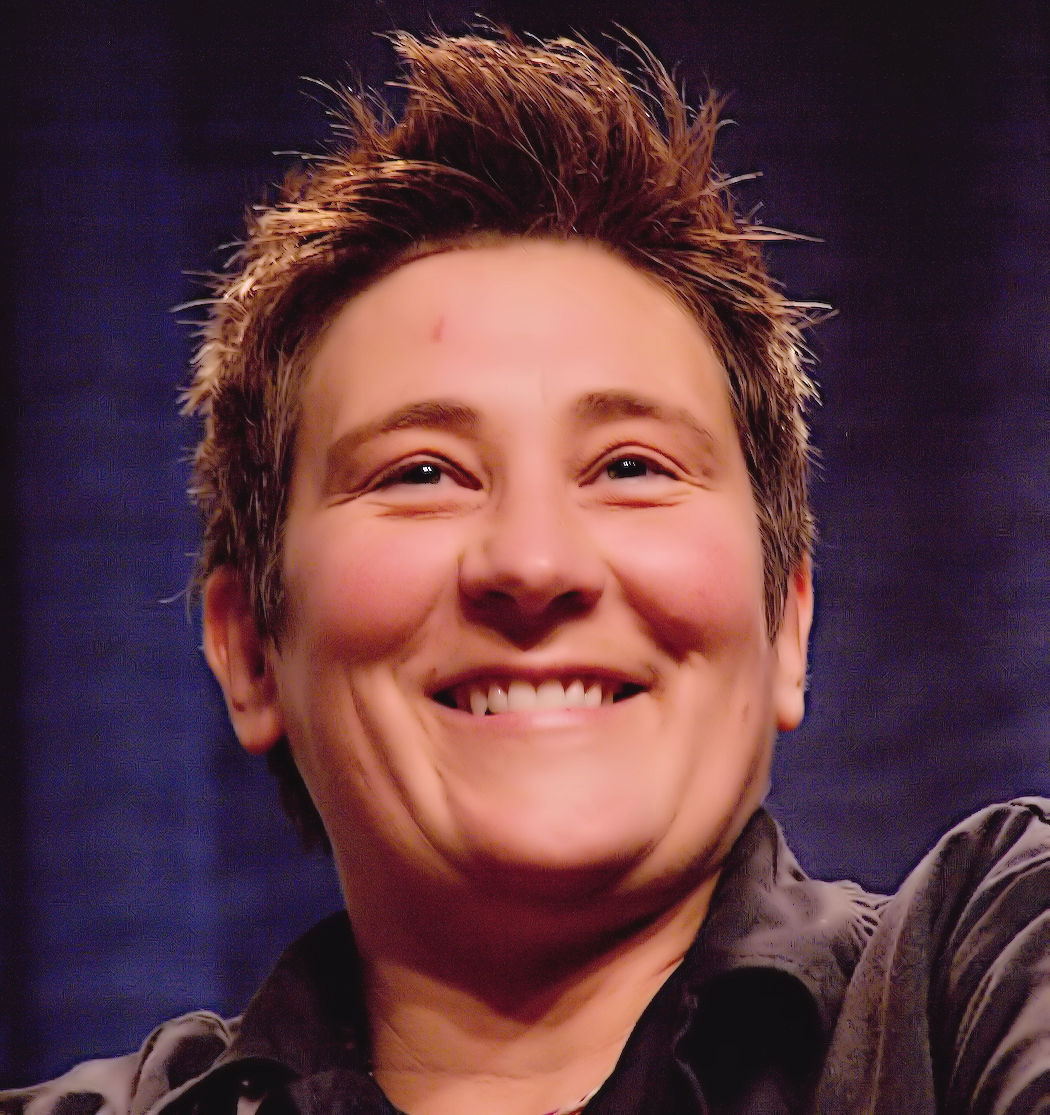
k.d. lang

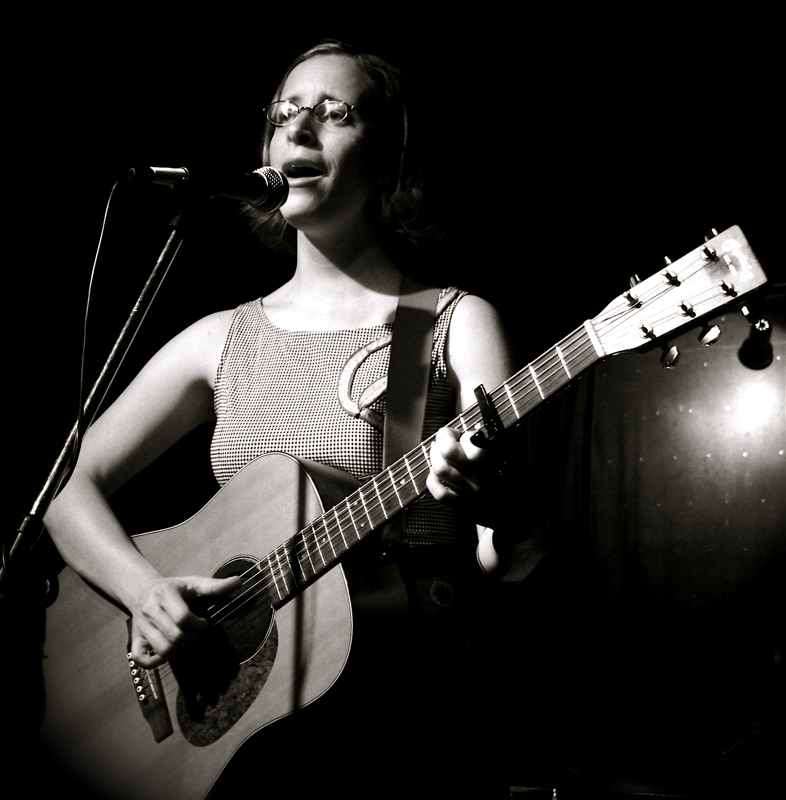
Laura Veirs

case/lang/veirs is a Canadian-American supergroup consisting of Neko Case, k.d. lang, and Laura Veirs, formed in Portland, Oregon in 2013. The group launched with a June 2016 eponymous album, followed by a 19-city summer 2016 tour.

== History ==
The trio of case/lang/veirs was formed in 2013, three years before the album release, when Lang, in a one-line e-mail, invited Case and Veirs to join her, and they responded affirmatively within 30 minutes.

The three musicians had decades of experience making music, and at that point had recorded over 30 studio albums between them.

Lang, who previously collaborated with Dwight Yoakam, Madeleine Peyroux and Ann Wilson, has said that she was considering retirement before forming the band, and she always wanted to "be part of a band, a real collaborative effort".

The band's sound is described as alt-country.

Two of the band members, lang and Veirs, live in Portland; Case joined them from her home in Vermont.

== Members ==
- Neko Case – vocals
- k.d. lang – vocals, acoustic guitar
- Laura Veirs – vocals, guitars

== Discography ==
Title	Album details	Peak chart positions	
Title	Album details	UK	US
case/lang/veirs	Released: June 17, 2016; Label: Anti-; Formats: CD, LP	28	33
