= Tucker Martine =

American musician (born 1972)

- Born: January 14, 1972 (age 54)
- Origin: United States
- Occupations: Record producer; musician; composer

Tucker Martine (born January 14, 1972) is an American record producer, musician and composer. In 2010, Paste Magazine included Martine in their list of the 10 Best Producers of the Decade.

== Early life ==
Tucker Martine, the son of singer and songwriter Layng Martine Jr., grew up in Nashville, Tennessee where he played in bands and tinkered with recording devices before moving to Boulder, Colorado upon graduating from high school. In Colorado, Martine was a DJ at a public radio station KGNU. Inspired by experimental production techniques, he would frequently play two or more records at once on the air. Martine also took courses at the Naropa Institute where he studied sound collage and befriended Harry Smith - the ethnomusicologist, artist and Kabbalist - who made a large impression on Martine.

== Career ==
In 1993, Martine moved to Seattle, Washington where he began to combine his skills and interests. He joined Wayne Horvitz's chamber group The 4 Plus 1 Ensemble alongside Reggie Watts where Martine's instrument was a series of looping and sound manipulating devices which were fed by the groups otherwise acoustic instruments. Martine received a Grammy nomination in 2007 in the "best engineered album" category for the Floratone album with Bill Frisell on Blue Note. He has also released several albums of his field recordings. As a composer and musician Martine has released 2 albums under the recording pseudonym Mount Analog as well as Mylab (a collaboration with keyboardist Wayne Horvitz) and Orchestra Dim Bridges (with violist Eyvind Kang). Additionally, Microsoft called upon Martine's creativity when they asked him to help compose the startup and branding sounds for Microsoft's new operating system Windows Vista.

== Discography ==
=== As Tucker Martine ===
- Eat the Dream: Moroccan Reveries (1994)
- Bush Taxi Mali (1998)
- Orchestra Dim Bridges with Eyvind Kang (2004)
- Broken Hearted Dragonflies: Insect Electronica from Southeast Asia (2005)
- "Fireworks - First Aid Kit" (2017)

=== With Floratone ===
- Floratone (2007)
- Floratone II 2012

=== With Wayne Horvitz ===
- 4+1 Ensemble (Intuition, 1996 [1998])
- From a Window (Avant, 2000)
- Mylab (2004)

=== As Mount Analog ===
- Mount Analog (1997)
- New Skin (2004)

== Selected discography ==
Artist	Release	Contribution	Year
Caamp	Copper Changes Color	Producer / Engineer	2025
Jake Xerxes Fussell	When I'm Called	Mixing	2024
Grandaddy	Blu Wav	Mixing	2024
Old 97's	American Primitive	Producer / Engineer / Mixing	2024
Charlie Parr	Little Sun	Producer / Engineer / Mixing / Photography	2024
The Decemberists	As It Ever Was, So It Will Be Again	Producer / Engineer / Mixing	2024
Jenny Scheinman	All Species Parade	Mixing	2024
Neko Case	Wild Creatures	co-Producer / Engineer / Mixing	2023
Joseph	The Sun	Producer / Engineer / Percussion, Drum Programming	2023
My Morning Jacket	MMJ Live Vol.3 Bonnaroo 2004 Return To Thunderdome	Mixing	2023
The National	Laugh Track	Co-Producer / Engineer	2023
My Morning Jacket	Happy Holiday!	Mixing	2023
Darlingside	Everything Is Alive	Mixing	2023
Madison Cunningham	Revealer	Producer / Engineer / Mixing	2022
Warpaint	Radiate Like This	Mixing	2022
Madison Cunningham	In From Japan	Producer / Engineer / Mixing	2022
Marisa Anderson and William Tyler	Lost Futures	producing, recording, mixing, drums, bass	2021
Rosanne Cash	She Remembers Everything	Producer / Engineer / Mixing	2018
Karl Blau	Introducing Karl Blau	Producer / Engineer / Mixing / Percussion	2016
case/lang/veirs	case/lang/veirs	Producer / Engineer / Mixing / Percussion	2016
Aoife O'Donovan	In the Magic Hour	Producer / Engineer / Mixing / Percussion	2016
My Morning Jacket	The Waterfall	Producer / Engineer / Mixing / Percussion	2015
The Decemberists	What a Terrible World, What a Beautiful World	Producer / Engineer / Mixing / Group Singing	2015
Modest Mouse	Strangers to Ourselves	Producer / Engineer	2015
Sufjan Stevens	Carrie and Lowell	Recordist	2015
Punch Brothers	The Phosphorescent Blues	Recordist	2015
Bill Frisell	Guitar in the Space Age!	Engineer	2014
Brian Blade	Landmarks	Engineer	2014
Don Henley / Blind Pilot	Looking Into You: A Tribute to Jackson Browne	Producer / Engineer / Mixing	2014
Jenny Scheinman	The Littlest Prisoner	Producer / Engineer / Mixing	2014
Camera Obscura	Desire Lines	Producer / Engineer / Mixing	2013
Lori Goldston	Film Scores	Engineer, Producer	2013
Jars of Clay	Inland	Producer / Engineer	2013
The Avett Brothers	Magpie and the Dandelion	Engineer	2013
Jim James	Regions of Light and Sound of God	Engineer	2013
Richard Buckner	Surrounded	Mixing	2013
Neko Case	The Worse Things Get, the Harder I Fight, the Harder I Fight, the More I Love You	Producer / Engineer / Mixing	2013
Laura Veirs	Warp & Weft	Producer / Engineer / Mixing	2013
Lau	Race the Loser	Producer	2012
Black Prairie	A Tear in the Eye Is a Wound in the Heart	Producer / Engineer / Mixing	2012
Floratone	Floratone II	Composer, Engineer, Producer	2012
Jenny Scheinman	Mischief & Mayhem	Mixing	2012
Beth Orton	Sugaring Season	Producer, Engineer, Mixing, Percussion	2012
The Avett Brothers	The Carpenter	Engineer	2012
Tift Merritt	Traveling Alone	Producer, Engineer	2012
The Chieftains	Voice of Ages	Engineer	2012
The Decemberists	We All Raise Our Voices to the Air: Live Songs 04.11.08	Mixing	2012
Various artists	The Hunger Games: Songs from District 12 and Beyond	Engineer	2012
My Morning Jacket	Circuital	Producer / Engineer / Mixing / Photography	2011
Abigail Washburn	City of Refuge	Producer / Engineer / Mixing / Drums	2011
R.E.M.	Collapse into Now	Engineer	2011
Wild Flag	Wild Flag	Mixing	2011
The Decemberists	Long Live the King	Producer / Engineer / Mixing	2011
Thao & Mirah	Thao & Mirah	Mixing	2011
The Decemberists	The King Is Dead	Producer / Engineer / Mixing	2011
John Wesley Harding	The Sound of His Own Voice	Mixing	2011
Laura Veirs	Tumble Bee: Laura Veirs Sings Folk Songs for Children	Producer / Engineer / Mixing / Drums	2011
Blind Pilot	We Are the Tide	Mixing	2011
Quasi	American Gong	Mixing	2010
Black Prairie	Feast of the Hunters' Moon	Producer, Engineer	2010
Laura Veirs	July Flame	Producer / Engineer / Mixing / Drums / Photography	2010
Tift Merritt	See You on the Moon	Producer / Engineer / Mixing	2010
Langhorne Slim	Be Set Free	Mixing	2009
Laura Gibson	Beasts of Seasons	Producer / Engineer / Mixing	2009
Bill Frisell	Disfarmer	Engineer, Mixing	2009
Spoon	Got Nuffin'	Mixing	2009
Thao & The Get Down Stay Down	Know Better Learn Faster	Producer / Engineer / Mixing	2009
Brian Blade	Mama Rosa	Composer, Engineer, Mixing	2009
Loch Lomond	Night Bats	Mixing	2009
Bill Frisell	The Best of Bill Frisell, Vol. 1: Folk Songs	Audio Engineer, Engineer, Mixing	2009
The Decemberists	The Hazards of Love	Producer, Engineer, Mixing	2009
Death Cab for Cutie	The Open Door EP	Mixing	2009
Mirah	(a)spera	Producer, Engineer. Mixing	2009
Wayne Horvitz	A Walk in the Dark	Engineer	2008
Colin Meloy	Colin Meloy Sings Live!	Assembly, Mixing	2008
Transmissionary Six	Cosmonautical	Mixing	2008
Chris Walla	Field Manual	Mixing	2008
Musée Mécanique	Hold This Ghost	Mixing	2008
Wayne Horvitz	One Dance Alone	Engineer	2008
Brian Blade	Season of Changes	Engineer, Mixing	2008
Mudhoney	The Lucky Ones	Producer / Engineer / Mixing	2008
Thao & the Get Down Stay Down	We Brave Bee Stings and All	Producer / Engineer / Mixing / Musician	2008
Steve Wynn	Crossing Dragon Bridge	Mixing	2008
Marco Benevento	Invisible Baby	Engineer	2008
Floratone	Floratone	Producer, Composer, Engineer, Producer	2007
Jesse Sykes & the Sweet Hereafter	Like, Love, Lust and the Open Halls of the Soul	Producer, Engineer, Mixing, Percussion	2007
Laura Veirs	Saltbreakers	Beats, Drums, Engineer, Mixing, Percussion, Producer	2007
Jim White	Transnormal Skiperoo	Drums, Engineer, Handclapping, Producer, Vocals	2007
Johanna Kunin	Clouds Electric	Producer, Mixing, Performer	2006
Heather Greene	Five Dollar Dress	Beats, Engineer, Mixing, Percussion, Producer	2006
Mike Dumovich	Mesojunarian	Drums, Engineer, Noise, Producer	2006
Transmissionary Six	Radar	Audio Production, Producer, Engineer, Mixing, Shaker, Tambourine	2006
The Decemberists	The Crane Wife	Producer, Engineer, Mixing	2006
Mudhoney	Under a Billion Suns	Producer, Engineer, Mixing, Treatments	2006
Bill Frisell	East/West	Engineer, Mixing	2005
The Long Winters	Ultimatum	Audio Production, Producer	2005
Erin McKeown	We Will Become Like Birds	Producer / Engineer / Mixing / Musician	2005
Laura Veirs	Year of Meteors	Producer / Engineer / Mixing / Musician	2005
Laura Veirs	Carbon Glacier	Producer, Musician, Engineer, Mixing, Composer, Treatments	2004
Jim White	Drill a Hole in That Substrate and Tell Me What You See	Producer, Drums, Engineer	2004
Bush Taxi Mali	Field Recordings From Mali	Producer, Engineer, Photography	2004
Broken Hearted Dragonflies	Insects of Southeast Asia	Producer, Recordist, Photography	2004
Mylab	Mylab	Producer, Composer, Musician, Mixing, Field Recording	2004
Mount Analog	New Skin	Producer, Composer, Musician, Engineer, Mixer	2004
Jesse Sykes and the Sweet Hereafter	Oh, My Girl	Producer, Engineer, Drums, Mixing	2004
Eyvind Kang	Virginal Co Ordinates	Engineer, Treatments	2003
Downpilot	Leaving Not Arriving	Producer, Drums, Engineer, Mixing, Beat Box	2003
Daniel Carter & Rueben Radding	Luminescence	Recording, Mixing	2003
John Zorn	Masada Guitars	Engineer	2003
Petra Haden & Bill Frisell	Petra Haden & Bill Frisell	Recorder, Mixer	2003
Kelly Joe Phelps	Slingshot Professionals	Engineer, Mixer	2003
Bill Frisell	The Intercontinentals	Engineer, Mixing	2003
Wayne Horvitz	American Bandstand	Producer, Engineer, Mixing	2003
Nicholas Vroman	Periods and Question Marks	Producer, Endineer, Mixing	2003
Jesse Sykes and the Sweet Hereafter	Reckless Burning	Producer, Engineer, Mixing	2002
Bill Frisell	The Willies	Engineer, Mixing	2002
Sarah Siskind	Covered	Producer, Drums, Mixing	2001
Four Plus One Ensemble	From a Window	Producer, Musician, Mixing, Drum Machines	2001
Laura Veirs	Triumphs and Travails of Orphan Mae	Producer, Drums, Engineer, Mixing, Field Recording	2001
Danny Barnes	Things I Done Wrong	Percussion, Engineer, Mixing	2001
Sanford Arms	Too Loud for the Snowman	Producer, Engineer, Mixing	2001
Eyvind Kang	The Story of Iceland	Drums, Voices, Recording, Mixing	2000
Eyvind Kang	Theater of Mineral NADEs	Drums	1998
Farmer Not So John	Receiver (album)	Producer	1998
Julian Priester and Sam Rivers	Hints on Light and Shadow	Electronics	1997
Eat the Dream	Gnawa Music From Essaouria, Morocco	Recorded, Produced	1996
Land of the Loops	Bundle of Joy	Mixing	1996
