= Korg DRM-1 =

Digital Rhythm Module

DRM-1
- Manufacturer: Korg
- Dates: 1987
- Price: $1314.11 US (1988)

Technical specifications
- Polyphony: 12
- Timbrality: 16
- Synthesis type: 12-bit digital samples
- Storage memory: 16 patterns, 16 songs, 4,400 notes

Input/output
- External control: 7 trigger pad ports, MIDI in/out/thru, footswitch, remote control unit.

The Korg DRM-1 (Digital Rhythm Module) is a drum machine manufactured by Korg from 1987. Introduced at the 1987 NAMM Convention, it is a 1U rack-mount unit featuring expansion card slots and a 5000-note drum sequencer.

== Background ==
The Korg DRM-1 previewed at the 1987 summer NAMM with a complimentary Korg electronic drum kit. However, weeks later Korg announced they were halting manufacture of the electronic drum kit. Speculation was that Yamaha's takeover of Korg may have had something to do with it. This resulted in "The Missing Link" ad campaign, highlighting that the rhythm module could be controlled by any kind of drum set. The ad image shows a Yamaha PTT8, Simmons SDSV, and Clavia DDRUM electronic pads mixed with a Yamaha 9000 Recording Custom acoustic drum kit.

== Sounds and features ==
The Korg DRM-1 Digital Rhythm Module is a multitimbral tone generator, that can be played from CV triggered drum pads (any brand) or via MIDI. It utilizes 12-bit Digital to Analog PCM wave memory synthesis and comes equipped with 23 internal preset timbres, which can be expanded by importing additional timbres from Korg DDD-1/5 ROM cards. Users can edit these timbres to create customized voices. Each voice is configured with Timbre, Sound mode (Poly, Mono, Exclusive), Pitch, Volume, Pan, Phase, Pad Settings, MIDI, and Output settings. The pitch adjustment employs a drop-sample method, periodically skipping data words to raise the pitch, which may distort timbres, particularly noticeable in cymbals.

Additionally, each Voice can have a main timbre and a sub timbre, allowing for dynamic changes in sound with increased velocity—a feature distinct to this Korg model at the time. The DRM-1 can store up to 256 different voices in its internal memory or on a RAM card, and these voices can be grouped into up to 16 different settings, which can also be saved to the internal memory or RAM cards.

The DRM-1 features a built-in sequencer that allows for the recording and playback of rhythm patterns and songs. Users can record from either drum pads or an external MIDI controller. It employs a real-time input system that includes methods such as punch-in, punch-out, or overdubbing. The sequencer includes note quantization options which range from 1/1 to 1/64. The internal memory of the DRM-1 can save up to 16 patterns and 16 songs, and its capacity can be expanded by using RAM cards.

The DRM-1 features seven input jacks for connecting 1/4" balanced drum pads. Each drum pad's sensitivity can be adjusted to ensure the velocity response appropriately covers ranges from pianissimo to fortissimo. The pad parameters include settings like Trigger Level, which dictates the minimum input level needed for the pad to respond, Voice Change Level that determines the point at which the sound shifts from MAIN to SUB voices, and Inhibit Time which sets the delay before accepting another signal. Furthermore, the pad functionality extends to controlling sequencer operations, allowing a pad to start and stop patterns or to toggle to the next or previous pattern.

The DRM-1 features a pair of 1/4" unbalanced stereo output jacks and eight additional 1/4" unbalanced multi-output jacks. It also includes a stereo pan control that enables users to position each individual voice output at one of seven points across the stereo field.

== Expansion cards ==
The DRM-1 is fully compatible with the library of ROM sound card that Korg produced for the DDD-1 and DDD-5 drum machines. There are about 45 official Korg cards:

- DDC-A01 Rock 1
- DDC-A02 Rock 2
- DDC-A03 Jazz 1
- DDC-A04 Fusion 1
- DDC-A05 E Drums 1
- DDC-A06 E Drums 2
- DDC-A07 Brushing 1
- DDC-A08 Gate Reverb 1
- DDC-A09 Gate Reverb 2
- DDC-A10 Gate Reverb 3
- DDC-A11 Gate Reverb 4 Electronic
- DDC-A12 Rock 3 / Ambience
- DDC-A13 Rock 4 / Hydraultic
- DDC-A14 Fusion 2 Fiberskin
- DDC-A15 E Drums 3
- DDC-A16 Rhythm Box
- DDC-B01 Latin 1
- DDC-B02 Latin 2
- DDC-B03 Latin 3
- DDC-B04 Latin 4
- DDC-B05 Latin 5
- DDC-B06 Japanese 1
- DDC-B07 India 1
- DDC-B08 Gate Percussion
- DDC-B09 African 1
- DDC-B10 Gamelan
- DDC-C01 Orchestra 1
- DDC-C02 Variation 1
- DDC-C03 Orchestra 2
- DDC-C04 Variation 2
- DDC-C05 Variation 3 (Bass)
- DDC-C06 Reverse 1
- DDC-C07 Finger Snaps
- DDC-C09 Variation 4
- DDC-D01 Cymbal 1
- DDC-D02 Cymbal 2
- DDC-D03 Cymbal 3
- DDC-D04 China Cymbal
- DDC-D05 Cymbal 4
- DDC-E01 Timbales 1
- DDC-E02 Bass Drum 1
- DDC-E03 Snare Drum 1
- DDC-E04 Snare Drum 2
- DDC-E05 Sound Effect
- DDC-E06 Tom 1
- DDC-E07 Bass Drum 2
