= Crazy 8s (band) =

American band

The Crazy 8s
- Origin: Corvallis, Oregon
- Genres: Rock, ska
- Years active: 1982–1994
- Labels: RedRum
- Members: Tim Tubb; Dan Schauffler; Todd Duncan; Mike Regan; Mark Wanaka; Rick Washington; Carl Smith

Crazy 8s is an American rock and ska band from Oregon. Although widely recognized as being a ska band, the manager and other members deny this label. In 1991 the band was described as "Original razor-tight horn lines ride upon endless clots of tropical polyrhythms ranging from ska and reggae to harder funk fusions."

== History ==
=== Formation and first album ===
The Crazy 8s were formed in Corvallis, Oregon as "The Cheeks" in 1982. However, because a UK band had already used this name, the band changed its name to "The Sweet Cheeks." During their earliest days, they were banned from Oregon State. Later in 1982, Todd Duncan, former sax player of Eugene rock band "The Sneakers", proposed that The Sweet Cheeks open for Billy Rancher and the Unreal Gods at La Bamba's in Portland. The month before the gig, Todd changed the name of the band to "Crazy 8s" and added several new songs to the band's lineup. During their performance, the members of the newly monikered group were noticed by Tony DeMicoli, the owner of La Bamba's, who hired the band to perform in the upcoming months.

The band opened for Romeo Void at Oregon State on October 5, 1982 and with The English Beat at the University of Oregon the same year. In Rolling Stone magazine, the Crazy 8s were defined as one of "nine bands to watch"

The cover of the band's Law and Order album has featured a series of cartoons by award-winning cartoonist Jack Ohman. Ohman's image for the original issue of the album, a caricature of President Ronald Reagan as a gunslinger toting nuclear missiles in his holsters, has been updated for successive reissues of the album. The most recent version of the Law and Order cover, for the album's 20th Anniversary, includes caricatures of Presidents Reagan, George H. W. Bush, Bill Clinton, and George W. Bush.

=== Reception ===
Law and Order sold over 12,000 units, and earned the band a number 9 rating on Rolling Stone for independent bands in the nation. The next album, Nervous in Suburbia, sold 6,000 within the first week. The band was named "Northwest Band of the Year" in 1985 by Seattle's Rocket music publication and the Oregonian.

After the release of the hit single "Johnny Q", the band's album reached the "Top 20" on the Gavin Report.

Greg Barbrick, a British writer for The Rocket, wrote:

[Crazy 8s'] vision is of expanding the parameters of popular vision...[their album, Doggapotamus] is a melting pot...

For Barbrick, Crazy 8s was a group that deserved to be "international sensations." In another issue of The Rocket, released not long after the Rolling Stone article, he wrote that:

[The Crazy 8s are] on the edge of pop success...

However, Crazy 8s did not break into mainstream pop culture.

Their 1985 song "Touchy Situation" reached the #6 position at CFNY (Toronto) and #13 at Z100 (Portland, Oregon).

== Founding members ==
- Phil Allen, tenor saxophone
- Todd Duncan, lead vocals and alto saxophone. - played in The Sneakers, from Eugene, Oregon in 1979 to 1982.
- Bruce Marler, trumpet
- Casey Shaar, keyboard.
- Malcolm Smith, bass guitar
- Tim Tubb, trombone. - wrote the piece "Johnny Q."
- Mark Wanaka, guitar.
- Rick Washington, drums.
- Gary Williams, percussion

== Additional members ==
(listed chronologically)

- Joe Johnson, tenor saxophone.
- Jim Wallace, bass guitar
- Mike Regan, bass guitar
- Carl Smith, percussion
- Dan Schauffler, tenor saxophone, flute, keyboard originally a member of the band Nu Shooz.
- Jerry Burton, tenor sax
- Megan Murphy, alto saxophone, flute, keyboard
- Ron Regan, keyboards and alto sax
- Lance Kreiter, drums, replaced Howard Clarke in 1993 and was in the band through the NYE show of 1994/1995 at Key Largo. Rejoined in August 2014.

== Discography ==
- 1984 - Law and Order.
- 1985 - Nervous in Suburbia.
- 1987 - Out of the Way.
- 1988 - Big Live Nut Pack.
- 1989 - Doggapotamus World.
- 1992 - Law and Order re-release .
- 1992 - Still Crazy After All These Beers.

Most albums were released under the Crazy 8s' official label, RedRum Records. The final album, Still Crazy After all these Beers, was released under BDC Records.

== Awards and honors ==
Player of the Year Award:

- 1987 - Dan Schauffler

Oregon Music Hall of Fame, 2007

Billboard Hits

- 1984 - Law and Order (College Media Journal)
- 1984 - "Johnny Q." (Screamer of the Week for WLIR)
- 1985 - Nervous in Suburbia (#69, Pulse Chainwide Sales Chart)
- 1985 - "Touchy Situation" (#6, CFNY Station)
- 1985 - "Touchy Situation" (#13, Z100 Portland)
