= Billy Rancher =

American rock vocalist and songwriter

Billy Rancher (February 28, 1957 – December 2, 1986) was an American rock vocalist and songwriter, front man of The Malchicks, Billy Rancher and the Unreal Gods, and Flesh and Blood (all based in Portland, Oregon). One of the most prominent performers in the Pacific Northwest music scene in the first half of the 1980s, he died of cancer before reaching the age of 30. The Unreal Gods were one of the original (2007) inductees of the Oregon Music Hall of Fame.

== Childhood and youth ==
Rancher was the child of Swedish immigrant Astrid Rancher (née Svensson) and New Jersey-born Lithuanian-American Joe Rancher, who met in Sioux Falls, South Dakota, married, and moved to Los Angeles. Three months after Billy, their oldest, was born, they moved to Alaska, where they lived 12 years before moving to Portland. Billy had two younger siblings: Ellen (b. March 6, 1960) and Lenny (b. April 17, 1961). His father died in 1978. In 1980, sister Ellen married Steve Pearson of Seattle band The Heats (later The Heaters), though Billy and Pearson never hit it off well.

He was an all-city shortstop playing baseball at Portland's Madison High School, and won an athletic scholarship to Mount Hood Community College, but dropped out to focus on music. His first professional band, the Malchicks, scored some local success and gained attention by quickly throwing together permits for a public tribute performance the day after John Lennon was shot, but broke up over musical differences and over lead guitarist Lenny Rancher, Billy's younger brother, being too heavy a drinker at the time even by the standards of a hard-drinking crowd. While in the Malchicks, Rancher met Karen Sage, who would remain his girlfriend for the rest of his life.

== The Unreal Gods ==
Based mainly on Rancher's reputation from the Malchicks, his new band Billy Rancher and the Unreal Gods scored a favorable mention from John Wendeborn, music critic of Portland's leading daily newspaper, The Oregonian before they'd even gigged. They opened to a packed house at a Southeast Portland bar, Tippers, on June 14, 1981. Bill Reader describes their sound as "melodic pop... rock/ska/new wave/rockabilly"; Rancher himself called it "Boom Chuck Rock" after one of his own songs, "Boom Chuck Rock Now". By the end of the summer they were playing several nights a week, at various venues, and had established themselves as the city's best band, making a major dent in the Seattle scene as well.

Go-go dancers, glam makeup and outrageous costumes (leopard-skin prints, pajamas) stood the Unreal Gods in contrast to the "punk..., skinny-tie new wave..., and macho working-class rock'n'roll" bands that otherwise dominated the Portland scene. They scored a gig warming up for reggae star Peter Tosh at Seattle's Paramount Theatre, though it proved to be one of the rare times they completely failed to win over an audience, who did not appreciate their theatrics (including a giant simulated spliff and fake onstage gun violence) and their white-boy take on ska. This was also the time of Rancher's first bout with cancer

Starting with a December 21, 1981 show, the Unreal Gods pretty much created the roughly 1,000-capacity Lung Fung Dragon Room as a performance venue, both for all-ages and 21-and-over shows. Among the regulars at these shows was the young Courtney Love. They went back into the studio in Seattle to record with Louis X. Erlanger as producer and made plans with Erlanger for an East Coast tour and an opportunity to showcase in New York City. However, the relationship quickly soured and they headed east with no firmed-up gigs, just places to crash with keyboardist Alf Ryder's New Jersey family, the Delias, several of whom had minor music-industry connections. Matti Delia arranged for Bruce Springsteen to be at their September 29, 1982 show with his guitar at a Westwood, New Jersey club called On Broadway. Rancher was coached to invite Springsteen up on stage, but declined to do so; despite some reports to the contrary, Springsteen never appeared onstage with the Unreal Gods.

Being in the New York area, the band managed to do some recording and pursued several music industry connections, but without any real success other than a good 2-day recording session with engineer Larry Alexander at the Power Station. The New York events led to a break with longtime manager Steve Hettum, and the band churned through several more managers over the next few months. Still, they soldiered on. By the time of Portland's 75th Rose Festival in June 1983, they had enough of a repertoire to play 75 different songs in the course of two shows at Lung Fung.

In the spring and summer of 1983, besides playing frequent Portland gigs, they played shows in Seattle; as in Portland, they were the biggest draw in town. They also played in Tacoma, Washington and Vancouver, British Columbia. By the end of November they had signed with Clive Davis at Arista Records. More precisely, Arista had signed Rancher as an individual, but he already had an earlier contract with the band members that was intended to prevent a lineup shuffle in such an event.

Signed to a label, the Unreal Gods could no longer make major decisions for themselves, and they performed only occasional Portland shows while Arista decided what to do with them. Davis assigned Peter McIan as their producer. McIan reworked some of their songs, for example insisting on adding bridges, and got them to do some demo tapes that Dave Stricker, at least, found too formulaic; tried unsuccessfully to get the band to change its name; and, in general, tried to get the band to narrow their style so that they would be easier to market. By late May 1984, they were at Westlake in West Hollywood, California, working with McIan but not getting on well with him. The sessions went poorly, the band's relationships with each other and Rancher's relationship with Karen Sage were both suffering, and, worst of all, Rancher had a recurrence of cancer, this time in his abdomen.

The band played a few Portland gigs before Rancher entered cancer treatment. He patched up his relationship with Karen Sage, underwent chemotherapy, and successfully fought off a $25 million lawsuit by one of the band's former managers, William Gladstone. The band tried to play some gigs without him: "a stupid idea" in Ryder's words, "horrible" shows in DuFresne's. He had just enough energy to do a solo acoustic performance at a December 7, 1984 tribute to John Lennon (on the fourth anniversary of Lennon's death), at which he publicly announced his medical condition. A few Unreal Gods gigs were planned for late January and early February, between his chemo and his surgery, but the first one, on January 26, 1985 went poorly and the band basically broke up on stage.

=== Recordings, etc. ===
The Unreal Gods recorded quite a few times, and were extensively videotaped by David Jester, who videotaped most of their live performances. Although most of this material remains unreleased, there were at least two official album-length releases (the self-released Boom Chuck Rock Now in 1982 and the Locals Only-released Made in Hong Kong in 2000) and there is extensive footage of the Unreal Gods in Jan Baross's KOIN-TV documentary Rocky Road about Billy Rancher. (The latter is also the name of Bill Reader's 1996 biography of Rancher.) Before they'd ever played publicly, the band recorded two songs ("Go Go Boots" and "Rockabilly Queen") at Wave Studio in Portland. With a small investment from the drummer's father, Dr. John Flaxel, in 1981-1982 they recorded the album "Boom Chuck Rock Now" (self-released May 30, 1982) at Portland's then-new High Tech Recording. While the album received airplay on numerous Pacific Northwest radio stations, it was widely agreed that it did not live up to their live show. KGON, Portland's leading radio station at the time, gave it no play at all.

On August 31, 1982 they recorded a 30-minute concert performance for Don Blank of KOIN-TV; in fact, the concert took multiple takes over the course of four hours. The sessions later with Erlanger later that year seem not to have produced any finished tracks. The five songs recorded in two days with engineer Larry Alexander at the Power Station, paid for again by John Flaxel. Alf Ryder's relative Joe Delia produced the Power Station sessions, as well as some less successful sessions later that year at Crystal Studios in Los Angeles. The New York and Los Angeles sessions eventually emerged in 2000 as Made in Hong Kong. The 1984 Arista sessions with McIan did not result in any finished tracks, or at least none finished to either the band's or Arista's satisfaction.

The band made at least two music videos. A performance of "Uptown" was filmed at Portland's Pittock Mansion in 1982. "The Police Tol' Me" was shot as a mix of stage performance and narrative video in Los Angeles in late 1982 or early 1983.

== The last years ==
Rancher gave one more performance before his surgery, headlining an all-star Portland benefit for his medical bills that was attended by roughly 1500 people including Portland mayor Bud Clark. After surgery, he got back together with his brother Lenny and others to form a self-described "white boy reggae" band called Flesh and Blood. The band debuted April 19, 1985 and immediately began gigging regularly in Portland clubs and other Pacific Northwest venues, though not to as much acclaim as had attended the Unreal Gods. Bill Reeder describes Rancher's songs for Flesh and Blood as "more spiritual, and thoughtful" than his earlier songs, less focused on just entertainment. Arista wasn't interested, and gave the band a waiver to "record up to five songs for inclusion on an EP that will be released only in the Northwest United States." His girlfriend Karen and his mother Astrid helped form a corporation called Karactor Records so that Rancher could focus on his music rather than the business side. He and Karen finally moved in together. Although he tried to keep up a clean diet and a healthy life, according to his brother Lenny, Rancher intermittently backslid at least briefly into drinking and using cocaine at this time. Efforts at recording the EP (working title: Thinkin' Zebra) were cut short by a relapse of a different sort: Rancher still had cancer. The EP was nonetheless completed and released in December, with Rancher at times directing changes from his hospital bed. Rancher himself was released—from hospital—shortly thereafter, in December 22. The EP was getting some airplay, but Rancher chose not to continue Flesh and Blood, partly because Lenny was drinking hard again. In any event, Rancher soon found himself back in the hospital.

When he emerged in late February, it was not because he was better, but because there was not much to gain from treatment. During this last period, he became formally engaged to Karen Sage (though he did not live long enough for their planned wedding date) and he adopted some of Christianity. Between then and his death on December 2, 1986, he was involved in several musical collaborations, mostly with people he'd played with in the past, but also with other Portland musicians such as trombonist Tim Tubb of the Crazy 8s. He did some recording and even played several shows (the last one on November 22, two days before he re-entered the hospital to die). No longer physically able to play a guitar, he played a Korg DDD-1 drum machine; at performances he mainly sat while singing, and on some of the studio recordings he even sang lying down. Some of his work from this period was captured on a limited-release 15-song cassette tape called Mr. Groove.

== Cancer ==
Rancher was first diagnosed with cancer August 23, 1981, his first summer with the Unreal Gods, just before their show warming up for Peter Tosh. He had a pair of surgeries at that time, one before the show to remove a tumorous testicle, the other afterward to remove lymph nodes. The latter surgery left a scar over much of his torso. Biopsies at the time showed no further cancer.

Tests for cancer showed up negative the next 10 months, and Rancher stopped going in for regular testing. However, in Los Angeles in September 1984 he found a softball-sized lump in his stomach and hustled back to Portland to see his doctor. He was prescribed a course of chemotherapy, followed by surgery. At the time, the doctors believed they had caught the cancer early enough to allow for a full recovery. Although the tumor turned out to be wrapped around Rancher's aorta and the 8-hour operation on February 6 was quite difficult, it was deemed a success at the time.

When the cancer recurred in the summer of 1985, Rancher at first attempted a "holistic" treatment, consisting entirely of diet and exercise, but on September 18, 1985 he allowed himself to be admitted to Portland's Good Samaritan Hospital. He resumed chemotherapy, nearly died of septic shock on October 24, spent 10 days in intensive care and seemed to be recovering. He was soon well enough to give interviews, and was released from hospital on December 22, but would be in and out of hospital the next few months. By late February 1986, it was clear that chemotherapy wasn't working, and the cancer had spread to his kidneys and liver. He managed to stay largely out of hospital and live something like a normal life (though he was quite physically weak) until November 24; he then was readmitted, and died on December 2, 1986.

== Bands ==
=== The Malchicks ===
September 1979 - January 1981

- Billy Rancher: rhythm guitar, vocals
- Lenny Rancher: lead guitar
- Pete Jorgusen: drums
- Cary Carlstrom: bass (1979-1980)
- Dave Stricker: bass (1980-1981)
- Rod Bautista: rhythm guitar
- Joe Dreiling: Management

There was at least one reunion performance, April 17, 1983.

=== The Unreal Gods ===
1981-January 26, 1985

- Billy Rancher: rhythm guitar, vocals
- Dave Stricker: bass
- Jon DuFresne: lead guitar
- Alf Ryder: keyboards
- Billy Flaxel: drums
- Go-go dancers (the "Goddesses A-Go-Go", 1981-1983) included, at various times, Mary Smith, Candyce Dru, Celeste Johnson, Alaina Pereira, and Patti Hatfield

Albums:

- "Boom Chuck Rock Now" (1982, self-released)
- "Made in Hong Kong" (2000, Locals Only)

=== Flesh and Blood ===
1985

- Billy Rancher: rhythm guitar, vocals
- Lenny Rancher: guitar
- Pete Jorgusen: drums
- Chuck Retondo: bass
- Mary "Lace" Reynolds: vocals
- Tom Cheek, saxophone
- Jim Cheek, trumpet
- joe Dreiling: management
- Ellen Rancher: additional vocals on EP only
- Attilio Panissidi III: keyboards on EP only
