= American rock =

Overview of rock music in the United States

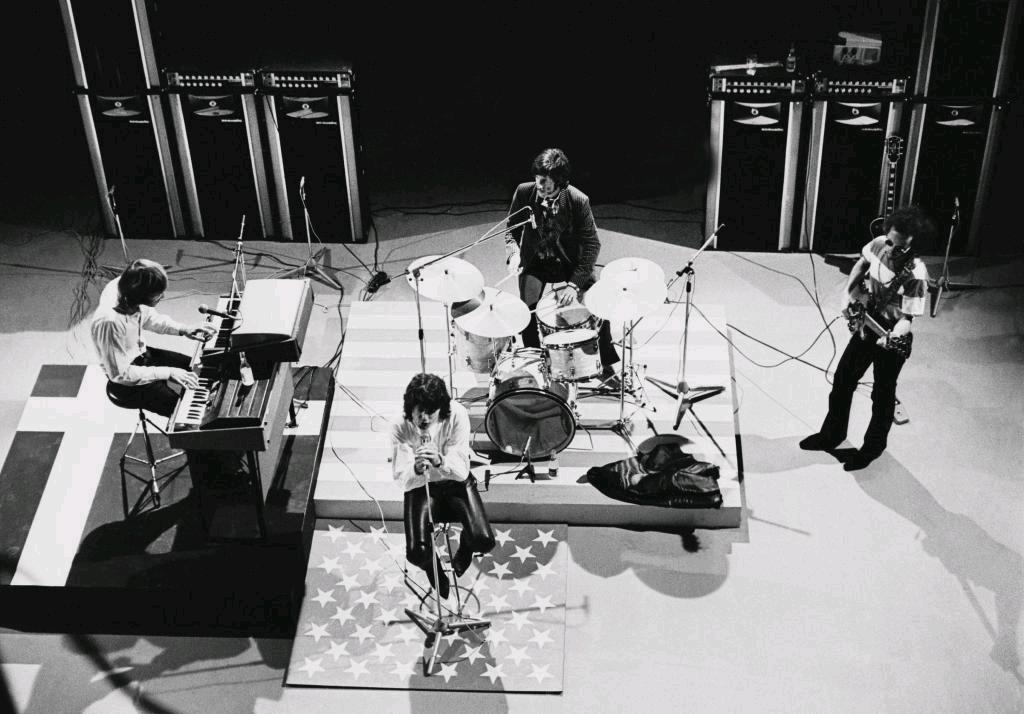
The Doors performing on a Danish television show in 1968.

American rock has its roots from 1940s and 1950s rock and roll, rhythm and blues, and country music, and also draws from folk music, jazz, blues, and classical music. American rock music was further influenced by the British Invasion of the American pop charts from 1964 and resulted in the development of psychedelic rock.

From the late 1960s and early 1970s, American rock music was highly influential in the development of a number of fusion genres, including blending with folk music to create folk rock, with blues to create blues rock, with country music to create country rock, roots rock and Southern rock and with jazz to create jazz rock, all of which contributed to psychedelic rock. In the 1970s, rock developed a large number of subgenres, such as soft rock, hard rock, heavy metal, glam rock, progressive rock and punk rock.

New subgenres that were derived from punk and important in the 1980s included new wave, hardcore punk, post-punk, thrash, and alternative rock. In the 1990s, alternative rock broke through into the mainstream with grunge, and other significant subgenres included indie rock and nu metal. In the 2000s genres that emerged into the mainstream included emo, metalcore and there was a garage rock/post-punk revival. The development of digital technology led to the development of new forms of digital electronic rock.

== Rock and roll (1950s to early 1960s) ==
=== Origins ===
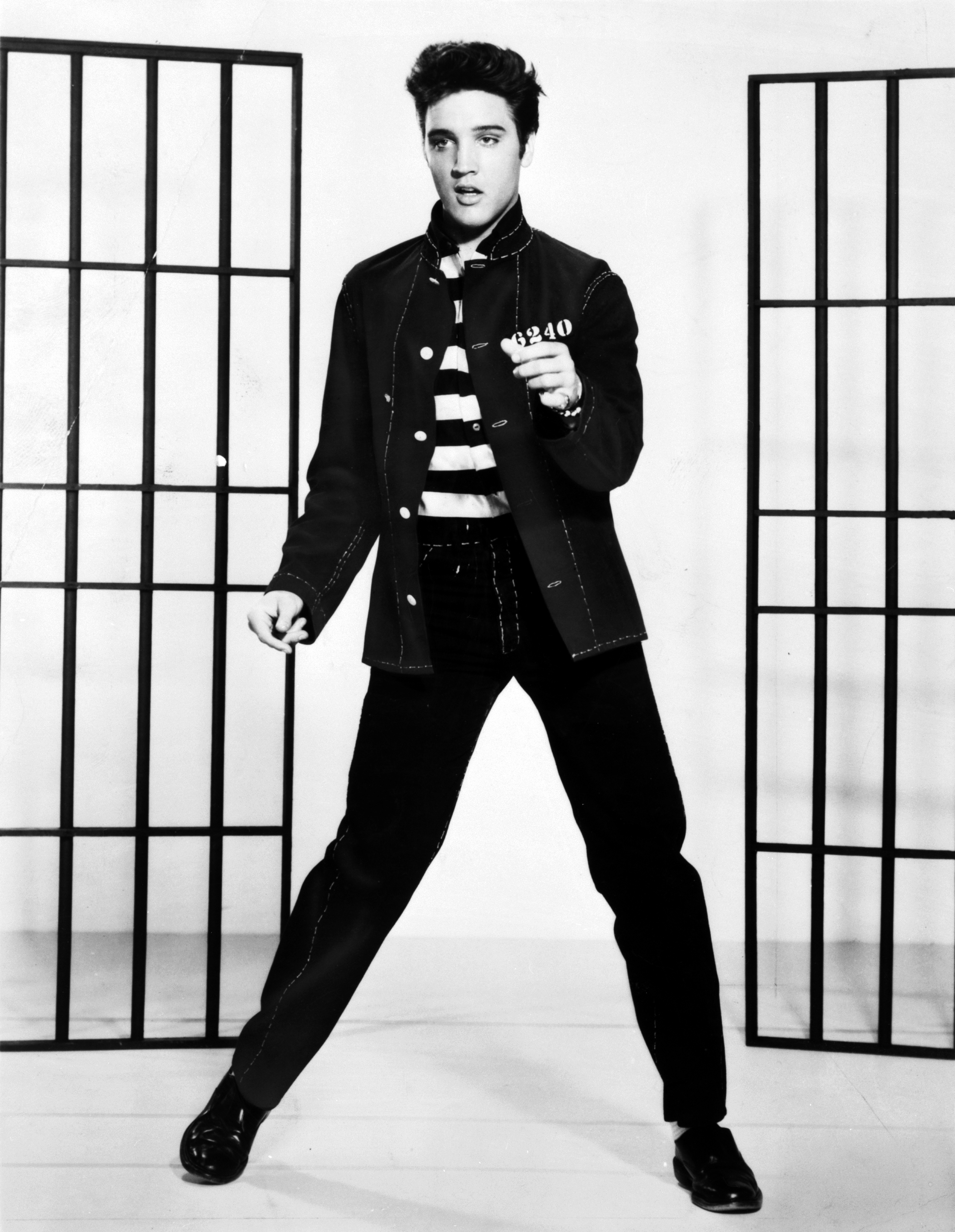
Elvis Presley is the most successful figure to emerge from rock and roll

The foundations of American rock music are in rock and roll, which originated in the United States in the late 1940s and early 1950s. Its immediate origins lay in a mixing together of various black musical genres of the time, including rhythm and blues and gospel music; in addition to country and western. In 1951, Cleveland disc jockey Alan Freed began playing rhythm and blues music for a multi-racial audience, and is credited with first using the phrase "rock and roll" to describe the music.

There is much debate as to what should be considered the first rock and roll record. One contender is "Rocket 88" by Jackie Brenston and his Delta Cats (in fact, Ike Turner and his band The Kings of Rhythm), recorded by Sam Phillips for Sun Records in Memphis in 1951. It has been argued that "That's All Right (Mama)" (1954), Elvis Presley's first major single for Sun Records was the first rock and roll record, but, at the same time, Big Joe Turner's "Shake, Rattle & Roll", later covered by Bill Haley, was already at the top of the Billboard R&B charts. Other artists with early rock and roll hits included Chuck Berry, Bo Diddley, Fats Domino, Little Richard, Jerry Lee Lewis, and Gene Vincent. Bill Haley's "Rock Around the Clock" (1955) became the first rock and roll song to top Billboard magazine's main sales and airplay charts, and opened the door worldwide for this new wave of popular culture. Soon rock and roll was the major force in American record sales and crooners, such as Eddie Fisher, Perry Como, and Patti Page, who had dominated the previous decade of popular music, found their access to the pop charts significantly curtailed.

=== Diversification ===
Rock and roll has been seen as leading to a number of distinct subgenres, including rockabilly, combining rock and roll with "hillbilly" country music, which was usually played and recorded in the mid-1950s by white singers such as Carl Perkins, Jerry Lee Lewis, Buddy Holly and with the greatest commercial success, Elvis Presley. In contrast doo wop placed an emphasis on multi-part vocal harmonies and meaningless backing lyrics (from which the genre later gained its name), which were usually supported with light instrumentation and had its origins in 1930s and 40s African American vocal groups. Acts like The Crows, The Penguins, The El Dorados and The Turbans all scored major hits, and groups like The Platters, with songs including "The Great Pretender" (1955), and The Coasters with humorous songs like "Yakety Yak" (1958), ranked among the most successful rock and roll acts of the period. The era also saw the growth in popularity of the electric guitar, and the development of a specifically rock and roll style of playing through such exponents as Chuck Berry, Link Wray, and Scotty Moore. Also significant was the advent of soul music as a major commercial force. It developed out of rhythm and blues with a re-injection of gospel music and pop and was led by pioneers like Ray Charles and Sam Cooke from the mid-1950s. By the early 60s figures like Marvin Gaye, James Brown, Aretha Franklin, Curtis Mayfield and Stevie Wonder were dominating the R&B charts and breaking through into the main pop charts, helping to accelerate their desegregation, while Motown and Stax/Volt Records were becoming major forces in the record industry. All of these elements, including the close harmonies of doo wop and girl groups, the carefully crafted song-writing of the Brill Building Sound and the polished production values of soul, have been seen as influencing the Merseybeat sound, particularly the early work of The Beatles, and through them and others the form of later rock music. Some historians of music have also pointed to important and innovative technical developments that built on rock and roll in this period, particularly the Wall of Sound pursued by Phil Spector.

=== "Decline" ===
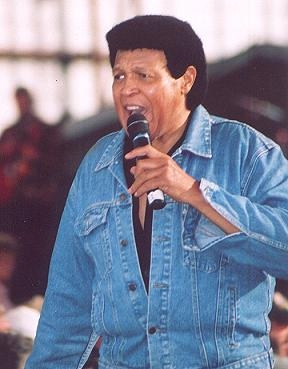
Chubby Checker in 2005

Commentators have traditionally perceived a decline of rock and roll in the late 1950s and early 1960s. By 1959, the death of Buddy Holly, The Big Bopper and Ritchie Valens in a plane crash, the departure of Elvis for the army, the retirement of Little Richard to become a preacher, prosecutions of Jerry Lee Lewis and Chuck Berry and the breaking of the payola scandal (which implicated major figures, including Alan Freed, in bribery and corruption in promoting individual acts or songs), gave a sense that the initial rock and roll era had come to an end. More recently some authors have emphasised important innovations and trends in this period without which future developments would not have been possible. While early rock and roll, particularly through the advent of rockabilly, saw the greatest commercial success for male and white performers, in this era the genre was dominated by black and female artists. Rock and roll had not disappeared at the end of the 1950s and some of its energy can be seen in the Twist dance craze of the early 60s, mainly benefiting the career of Chubby Checker. Having died down in the late 1950s, doo wop enjoyed a revival in the same period, with hits for acts like The Marcels, The Capris, Maurice Williams and Shep and the Limelights. The rise of girl groups like The Chantels, The Shirelles and The Crystals placed an emphasis on harmonies and polished production that was in contrast to earlier rock and roll. Some of the most significant girl group hits were products of the Brill Building Sound, named after the block in New York where many songwriters were based, which included the number 1 hit for the Shirelles "Will You Love Me Tomorrow" in 1960, penned by the partnership of Gerry Goffin and Carole King.

=== Surf music ===
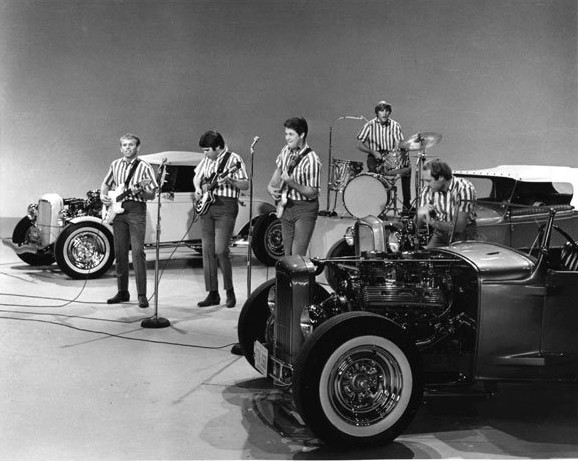
The Beach Boys performing on The Ed Sullivan Show in 1964

The instrumental rock and roll pioneered by performers such as Duane Eddy, Link Wray, and The Ventures was developed by Dick Dale who added distinctive "wet" reverb, rapid alternate picking, as well as Middle Eastern and Mexican influences, producing the regional hit "Let's Go Trippin'" in 1961 and launching the surf music craze. Like Dale and his Del-Tones, most early surf bands were formed in Southern California, including the Bel-Airs, The Challengers, and Eddie & the Showmen. The Chantays scored a top ten national hit with "Pipeline" in 1963 and probably the best known surf tune was 1963's "Wipe Out", by the Surfaris, which hit number 2 and number 10 on the Billboard charts in 1965. The growing popularity of the genre led groups from other areas to try their hand. These included The Astronauts, from Boulder, Colorado, The Trashmen, from Minneapolis, Minnesota, who had a number 4 hit with "Surfin' Bird" in 1964 and The Rivieras from South Bend, Indiana, who reached number 5 in 1964 with "California Sun". The Atlantics, from Sydney, Australia, made a significant contribution to the genre, with their hit "Bombora" (1963).

Surf music achieved its greatest commercial success as vocal music, particularly the work of the Beach Boys, formed in 1961 in Southern California. Their early albums included both instrumental surf rock (among them covers of music by Dick Dale) and vocal songs, drawing on rock and roll and doo wop and the close harmonies of vocal pop acts like the Four Freshmen. Their first chart hit, "Surfin'" in 1962 reached the Billboard top 100 and helped make the surf music craze a national phenomenon. From 1963 the group began to leave surfing behind as subject matter as Brian Wilson became their major composer and producer, moving on to the more general themes of male adolescence including cars and girl in songs like "Fun, Fun, Fun" (1964) and "California Girls" (1965). Other vocal surf acts followed, including one-hit wonders like Ronny & the Daytonas with "G. T. O." (1964) and Rip Chords with "Hey Little Cobra", which both reached the top ten, but the only other act to achieve sustained success with the formula were Jan & Dean, who had a number 1 hit with "Surf City" (co-written with Brian Wilson) in 1963. The surf music craze, and the careers of almost all surf acts, was effectively ended by the arrival of the British Invasion from 1964. Only the Beach Boys were able to sustain a creative career into the mid-1960s, producing a string of hit singles and albums, including the highly regarded Pet Sounds in 1966, which made them, arguably, the only American rock or pop act that could rival The Beatles.

== Development (mid-to-late 1960s) ==
=== The British Invasion ===
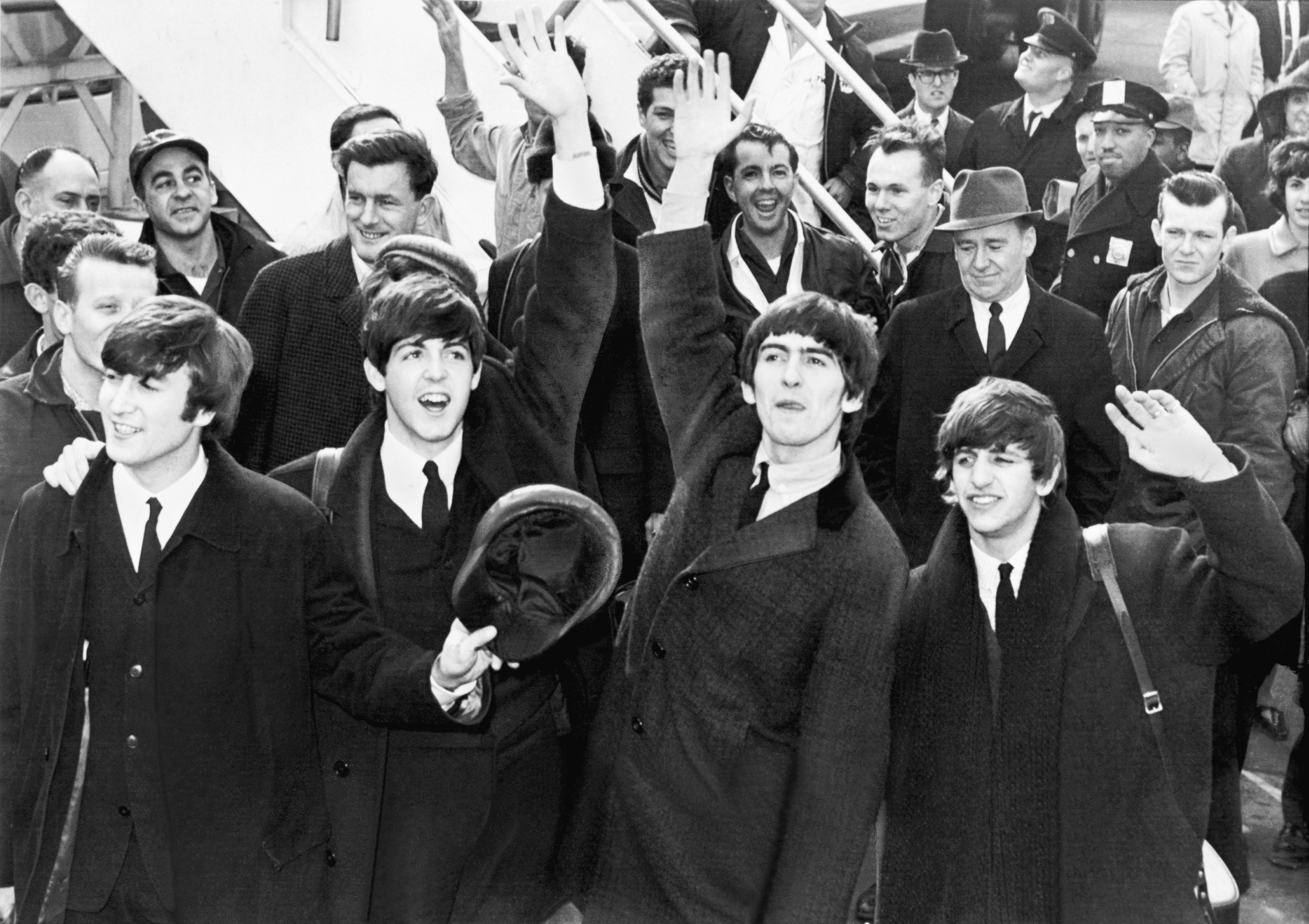
The arrival of The Beatles in the U.S., and subsequent appearance on The Ed Sullivan Show, marked the start of the British Invasion

By the end of 1962 British beat groups like The Beatles were drawing on a wide range of American influences including soul music, rhythm and blues and surf music. Initially, they reinterpreted standard American tunes, playing for dancers doing the twist, for example. These groups eventually infused their original compositions with increasingly complex musical ideas and a distinctive sound. During 1963, The Beatles and other beat groups, such as The Searchers and The Hollies, achieved popularity and commercial success in Britain.

British rock broke through to mainstream popularity in the United States in January 1964 with the success of the Beatles. "I Want to Hold Your Hand" was the band's first number 1 hit on the Billboard Hot 100 chart, starting the British Invasion of the American music charts. The song entered the chart on January 18, 1964, at number 45 before it became the number 1 single for 7 weeks and went on to last a total of 15 weeks in the chart. Their first appearance on The Ed Sullivan Show February 9 is considered a milestone in American pop culture. The broadcast drew an estimated 73 million viewers, at the time a record for an American television program. The Beatles went on to become the biggest selling rock band of all time and they were followed by numerous British bands, particularly those influenced by blues music including The Rolling Stones, The Animals and The Yardbirds.

The British Invasion arguably spelled the end of instrumental surf music, vocal girl groups and (for a time) the teen idols, that had dominated the American charts in the late 1950s and early 60s. It dented the careers of established R&B acts like Fats Domino and Chubby Checker and even temporarily derailed the chart success of surviving rock and roll acts, including Elvis. The British Invasion also played a major part in the rise of a distinct genre of rock music, and cemented the primacy of the rock group, based on guitars and drums and producing their own material as singer-songwriters.

=== Garage rock ===
Garage rock was a raw form of rock music, prevalent in North America in the mid-1960s, and called so because of the perception that it was rehearsed in a suburban family garage. Garage rock songs revolved around the traumas of high school life, with songs about "lying girls" being particularly common. The lyrics and delivery were more aggressive than was common at the time, often with growled or shouted vocals that dissolved into incoherent screaming. They ranged from crude one-chord music (like the Seeds) to near-studio musician quality (including the Knickerbockers, the Remains, and the Fifth Estate). There were also regional variations in many parts of the country with flourishing scenes particularly in California and Texas. The Pacific Northwest states of Washington and Oregon had perhaps the most defined regional sound.

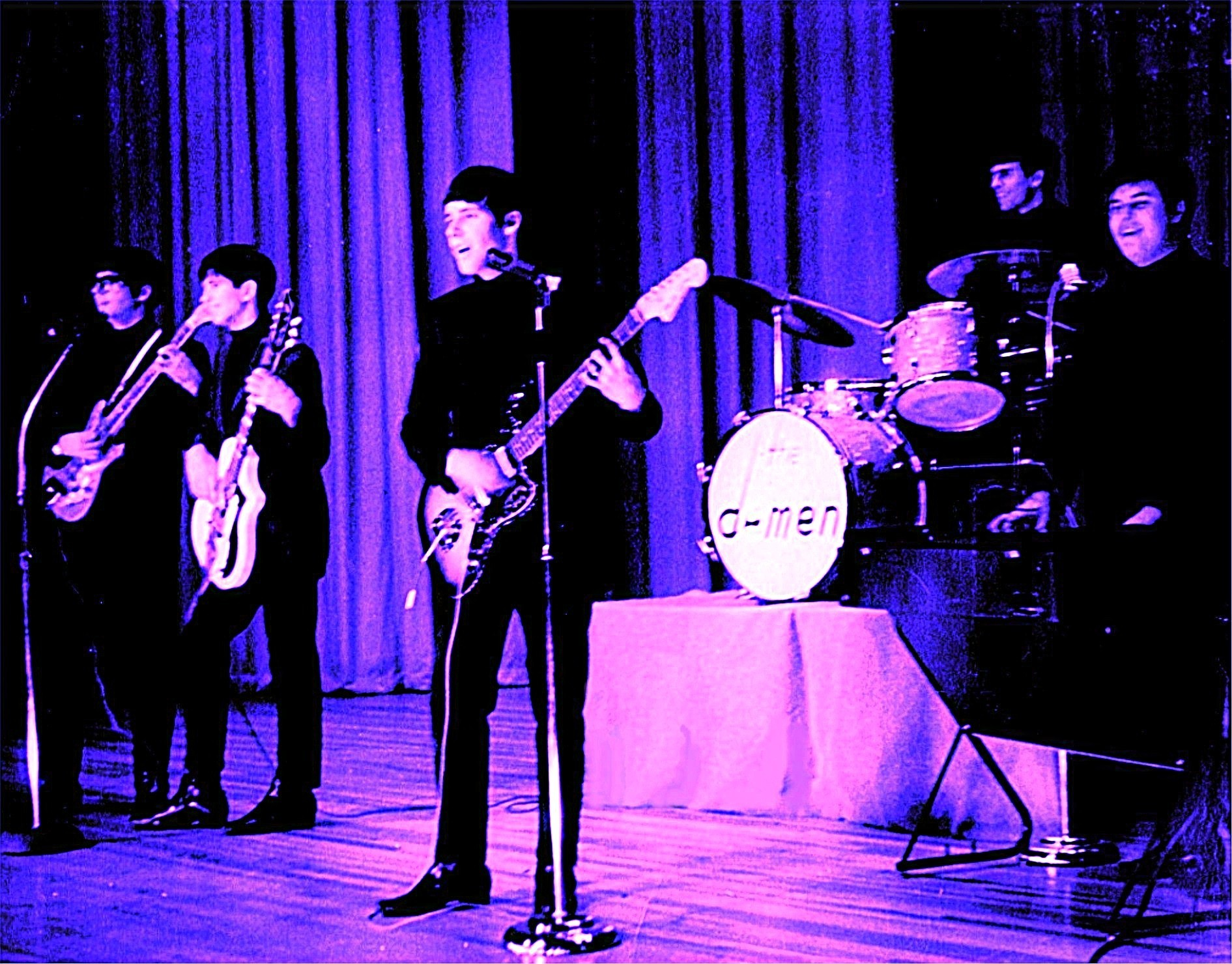
The D-Men (later The Fifth Estate) in 1964

The style had been evolving from regional scenes as early as 1958. "Tall Cool One" (1959) by The Wailers and "Louie Louie" by The Kingsmen (1963) are mainstream examples of the genre in its formative stages. By 1963, garage band singles were creeping into the national charts in greater numbers, including Paul Revere and the Raiders (Boise), the Trashmen (Minneapolis) and the Rivieras (South Bend, Indiana). Other influential garage bands, such as the Sonics (Tacoma, Washington), never reached the Billboard Hot 100. In this early period many bands were heavily influenced by surf rock and there was a cross-pollination between garage rock and frat rock, sometimes viewed as merely a subgenre of garage rock.

The British Invasion of 1964–66 greatly influenced garage bands, providing them with a national audience, leading many (often surf or hot rod groups) to adopt a British Invasion lilt, and encouraging many more groups to form. Thousands of garage bands were extant in the US and Canada during the era and hundreds produced regional hits. Examples include: "I Just Don't Care" by New York City's The D-Men (1965), "The Witch" by Tacoma's The Sonics (1965), "Where You Gonna Go" by Detroit's Unrelated Segments (1967), "Girl I Got News for You" by Miami's Birdwatchers (1966) and "1–2–5" by Montreal's The Haunted. Despite scores of bands being signed to major or large regional labels, most were commercial failures. It is generally agreed that garage rock peaked both commercially and artistically around 1966. By 1968 the style largely disappeared from the national charts and at the local level as amateur musicians faced college, work or the draft. New styles had evolved to replace garage rock (including blues-rock, progressive rock and country rock). In Detroit garage rock stayed alive until the early 70s, with bands like the MC5 and The Stooges, who employed a much more aggressive style. These bands began to be labelled punk rock and are now often seen as proto-punk or proto-hard rock.

=== Blues rock ===
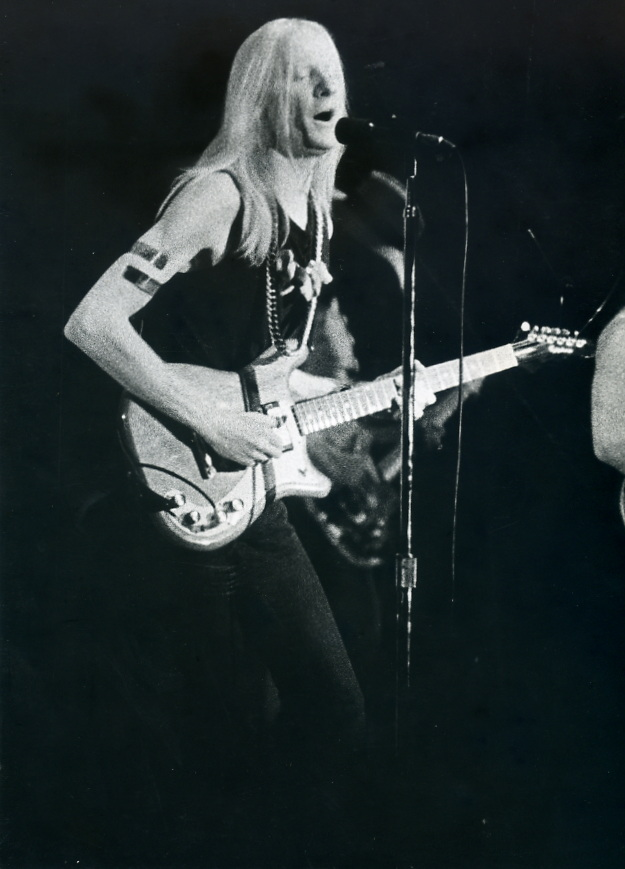
Johnny Winter performing in 1969

In America blues rock had been pioneered in the early 1960s by guitarist Lonnie Mack, but the genre began to take off in the US the mid-60s as acts developed a sound similar to British blues musicians. Key acts included Paul Butterfield (whose band acted like Mayall's Bluesbreakers in Britain as a starting point for many successful musicians), Canned Heat, the early Jefferson Airplane, Janis Joplin, Johnny Winter, The J. Geils Band and Jimi Hendrix with his power trios, the Jimi Hendrix Experience and Band of Gypsys, whose guitar virtuosity and showmanship would be among the most emulated of the decade.

Early blues rock bands often emulated jazz, playing long, involved improvisations, which would later be a major element of progressive rock. From about 1967 bands like Cream had begun to move away from purely blues-based music into psychedelia. By the 1970s blues rock had become heavier and more riff-based, exemplified by the work of British bands Led Zeppelin and Deep Purple, and the lines between blues rock and hard rock "were barely visible", as bands began recording rock-style albums. The genre was continued in the 1970s by figures such as George Thorogood, but bands became focused on heavy metal innovation, and blues rock began to slip out of the mainstream.

=== Folk rock ===
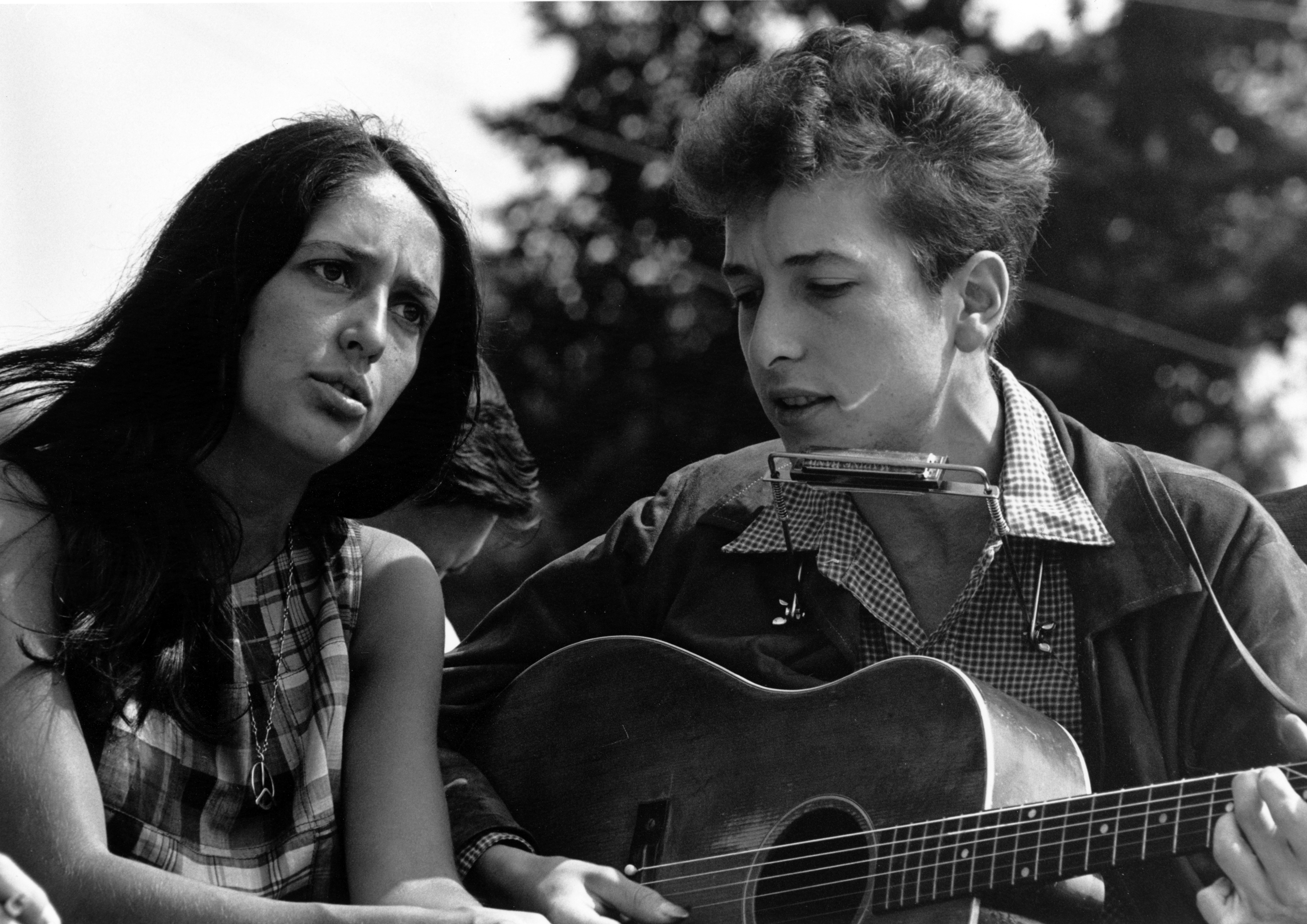
Joan Baez and Bob Dylan

By the 1960s, the scene that had developed out of the American folk music revival had grown to a major movement, using traditional music and new compositions in a traditional style, usually on acoustic instruments. In America the genre was pioneered by figures such as Woody Guthrie and Pete Seeger and often identified with progressive or labor politics. In the early sixties figures such as Joan Baez and Bob Dylan had come to the fore in this movement as singer-songwriters. Dylan had begun to reach a mainstream audience with hits including "Blowin' in the Wind" (1963) and "Masters of War" (1963), which brought "protest songs" to a wider public, but, although beginning to influence each other, rock and folk music had remained largely separate genres, often with mutually exclusive audiences.

The folk rock movement is usually thought to have taken off with The Byrds' recording of Dylan's "Mr. Tambourine Man" which topped the charts in 1965. With members who had been part of the cafe-based folk scene in Los Angeles, the Byrds adopted rock instrumentation, including drums and 12-string Rickenbacker guitars, which became a major element in the sound of the genre. Later that year Dylan adopted electric instruments, much to the outrage of many folk purists, with his "Like a Rolling Stone" becoming a US hit single. Folk rock particularly took off in California, where it led acts like The Mamas & the Papas and Crosby, Stills and Nash to move to electric instrumentation, and in New York, where it spawned performers including The Lovin' Spoonful and Simon and Garfunkel, with the latter's acoustic "The Sounds of Silence" being remixed with rock instruments to be the first of many hits.

Folk rock reached its peak of commercial popularity in the period 1967-8, before many acts moved off in a variety of directions, including Dylan and the Byrds, who began to develop country rock. However, the hybridization of folk and rock has been seen as having a major influence on the development of rock music, bringing in elements of psychedelia, and helping to develop the ideas of the singer-songwriter, the protest song and concepts of "authenticity".

=== Psychedelic rock ===
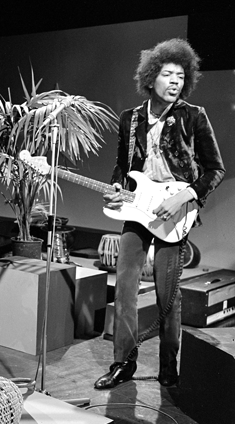
Jimi Hendrix performing on Dutch TV in 1967

Psychedelic music's LSD-inspired vibe began in the folk scene, with the New York-based Holy Modal Rounders using the term in their 1964 recording of "Hesitation Blues". The first group to advertise themselves as psychedelic rock were the 13th Floor Elevators from Texas, at the end of 1965; producing an album that made their direction clear, with The Psychedelic Sounds of the 13th Floor Elevators the following year.

Psychedelic rock particularly took off in California's emerging music scene as groups followed the Byrds from folk to folk rock from 1965. The psychedelic life style had already developed in San Francisco and particularly prominent products of the scene were The Grateful Dead, Country Joe and the Fish, The Great Society and Jefferson Airplane. The Byrds rapidly progressed from purely folk rock in 1966 with their single "Eight Miles High", widely taken to be a reference to drug use.

Psychedelic rock reached its apogee in the last years of the decade. The Summer of Love of 1967 was prefaced by the Human Be-In event and reached its peak at the Monterey Pop Festival, the latter helping to make a major American star of Jimi Hendrix. Key recordings included Jefferson Airplane's Surrealistic Pillow and The Doors' Strange Days. These trends climaxed in the 1969 Woodstock festival, which saw performances by most of the major psychedelic acts, but by the end of the decade psychedelic rock was in retreat. The Jimi Hendrix Experience and Cream broke up and many surviving acts moved away from psychedelia into more back-to-basics "roots rock", the wider experimentation of progressive rock, or riff-laden heavy rock.

== Roots rock (late 1960s to early 1970s) ==
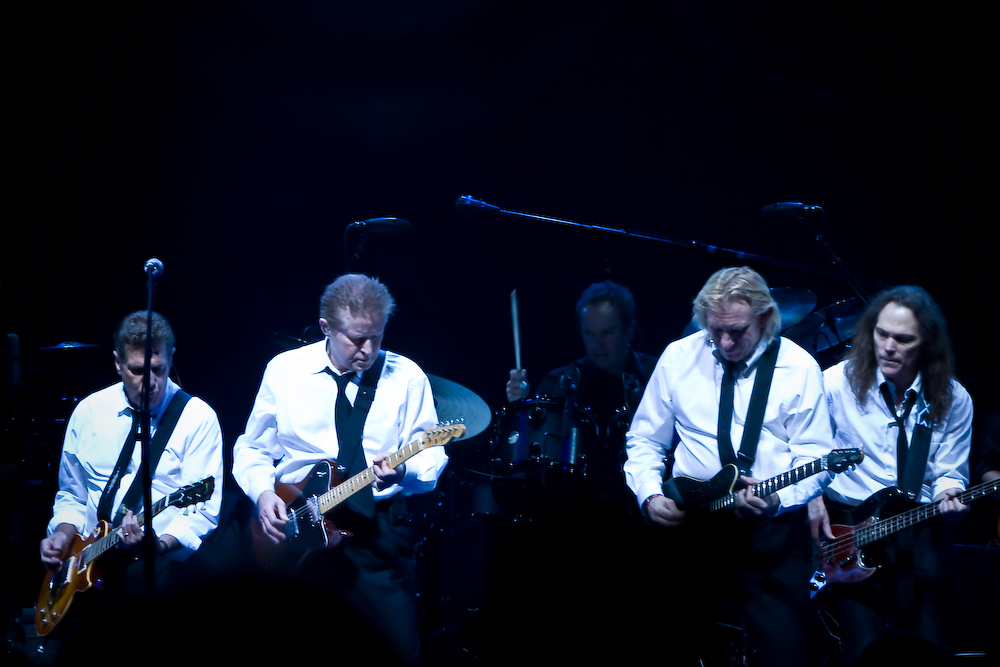
The Eagles during their 2008–09 Long Road out of Eden Tour

Roots rock is the term now used to describe a move away from what some saw as the excesses of the psychedelic scene, to a more basic form of rock and roll that incorporated its original influences, particularly country and folk music, leading to the creation of country rock and Southern rock. In 1966 Bob Dylan went to Nashville to record the album Blonde on Blonde. This, and subsequent more clearly country-influenced albums, have been seen as creating the genre of country folk, a route pursued by a number of, largely acoustic, folk musicians. Other acts that followed the back-to-basics trend included the Californian-based Creedence Clearwater Revival, who mixed basic rock and roll with folk, country and blues, to be among the most successful and influential bands of the late 1960s. The same movement saw the beginning of the recording careers of Californian solo artists like Ry Cooder, Bonnie Raitt and Lowell George, and influenced the work of established performers such as the Rolling Stones' Beggar's Banquet (1968) and the Beatles' Let It Be (1970).

=== Country rock ===
In 1968 Gram Parsons recorded Safe at Home with the International Submarine Band, arguably the first true country-rock album. Later that year he joined the Byrds for Sweetheart of the Rodeo (1968), generally considered one of the most influential recordings in the genre. The Byrds continued in the same vein, but Parsons left to be joined by another ex-Byrds member Chris Hillman in forming The Flying Burrito Brothers who helped establish the respectability and parameters of the genre, before Parsons departed to pursue a solo career. Country rock was particularly popular in the Californian music scene, where it was adopted by bands including Hearts and Flowers, Poco and New Riders of the Purple Sage, the Beau Brummels and the Nitty Gritty Dirt Band. Some performers also enjoyed a renaissance by adopting country sounds, including: the Everly Brothers; one-time teen idol Rick Nelson who became the frontman for the Stone Canyon Band; former Monkee Mike Nesmith who formed the First National Band; and Neil Young. The Dillards were, unusually, a country act, who moved towards rock music. The greatest commercial success for country rock came in the 1970s, with artist including the Doobie Brothers, Emmylou Harris, Linda Ronstadt and the Eagles (made up of members of the Burritos, Poco and Stone Canyon Band), who emerged as one of the most successful rock acts of all time, producing albums that included Hotel California (1976).

=== Southern rock ===
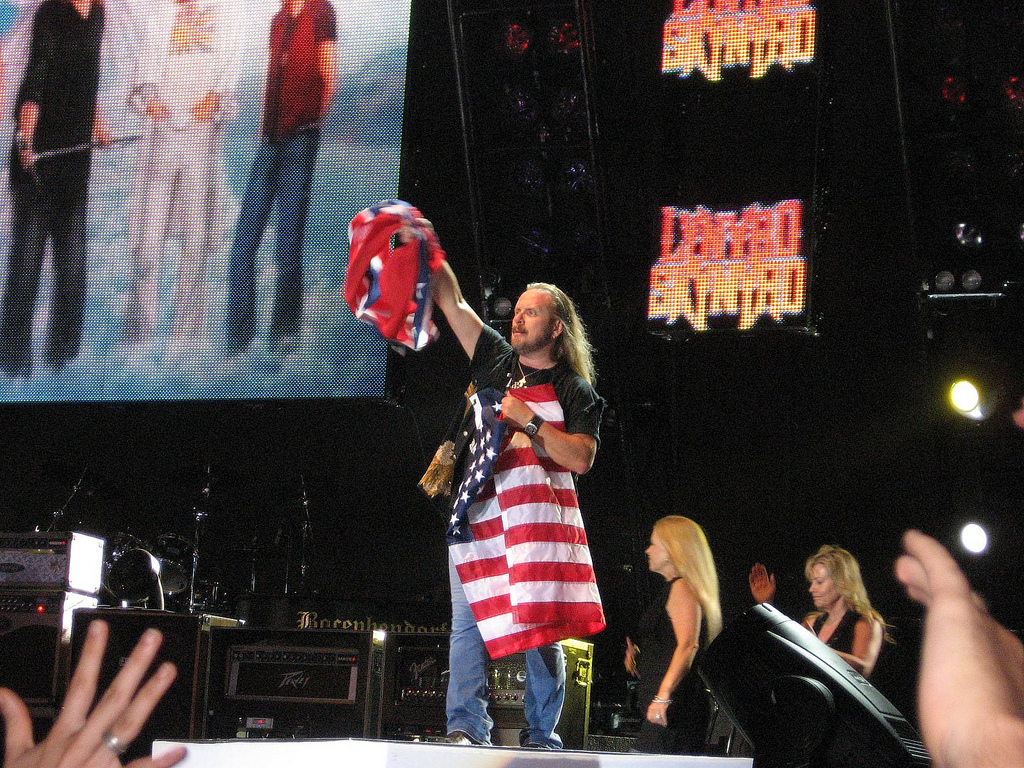
Lynyrd Skynyrd onstage in 2007

The founders of Southern rock are usually thought to be the Allman Brothers Band, who developed a distinctive sound, largely derived from blues rock, but incorporating elements of boogie, soul, and country in the early 1970s. The most successful act to follow them were Lynyrd Skynyrd, who helped establish the "good ol' boy" image of the subgenre and the general shape of 1970s guitar rock. Their successors included the fusion/progressive instrumentalists Dixie Dregs, the more country-influenced Outlaws, jazz-leaning Wet Willie and (incorporating elements of R&B and gospel) the Ozark Mountain Daredevils. After the loss of original members of the Allmans and Lynyrd Skynyrd, the genre began to fade in popularity in the late 1970s, but was sustained the 1980s with acts like .38 Special, Molly Hatchet and The Marshall Tucker Band.

== New genres (the early 1970s) ==
=== Progressive rock ===
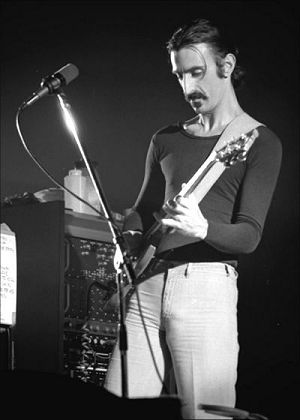
Frank Zappa performing in Ekeberghallen, Oslo in 1977

Progressive rock, a term sometimes used interchangeably with art rock, was an attempt to move beyond established musical formulas by experimenting with different instruments, song types, and forms. From the mid-1960s groups including The Left Banke and The Beach Boys, had pioneered the inclusion of harpsichords, wind and string sections on their recordings to produce a form of Baroque rock. Instrumentals were common, while songs with lyrics were sometimes conceptual, abstract, or based in fantasy and science fiction. The American brand of prog rock varied from the eclectic and innovative Frank Zappa, Captain Beefheart and Blood, Sweat and Tears, to more pop rock orientated bands like Boston, Foreigner, Kansas, Journey and Styx. These, beside British bands Supertramp and Electric Light Orchestra, all demonstrated a prog rock influence and while ranking among the most commercially successful acts of the 1970s, issuing in the era of pomp or arena rock, which would last until the costs of complex shows (often with theatrical staging and special effects), would be replaced by more economical rock festivals as major live venues in the 1990s.

=== Glam rock ===
Glam rock was prefigured by the showmanship and gender identity manipulation of American acts such as The Cockettes and Alice Cooper. It emerged from the English psychedelic and art rock scenes of the late 1960s and can be seen as both an extension of, and reaction against, those trends. Musically it was very diverse, varying between the simple rock and roll revivalism to complex art rock, and can be seen as much as a fashion as a musical subgenre. Visually it was a mesh of various styles, ranging from 1930s Hollywood glamor, through 1950s pin-up sex appeal, pre-war Cabaret theatrics, Victorian literary and symbolist styles, science fiction, to ancient and occult mysticism and mythology; manifesting itself in outrageous clothes, makeup, hairstyles, and platform-soled boots. Glam is most noted for its sexual and gender ambiguity and representations of androgyny, beside extensive use of theatrics. The success of British artists like David Bowie led to the adoption of glam styles among acts like Lou Reed, Iggy Pop, New York Dolls and Jobriath, often known as "glitter rock" and with a darker lyrical content than their British counterparts.

=== Soft and hard rock ===
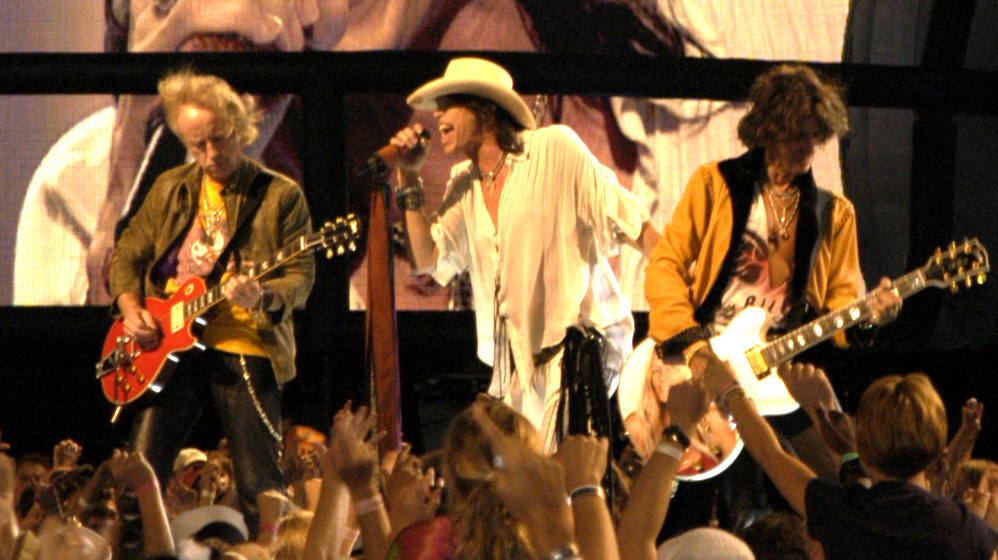
Aerosmith performing in 2003

From the late 1960s it became common to divide mainstream rock music into soft and hard rock. Soft rock was often derived from folk rock, using acoustic instruments and putting more emphasis on melody and harmonies. Major artists included Carole King, James Taylor and America. It reached its commercial peak in the mid- to late- 70s with acts like Billy Joel and the reformed Fleetwood Mac, whose Rumours (1977) was the best-selling album of the decade. In contrast, hard rock was more often derived from blues-rock and was played louder and with more intensity. It often emphasised the electric guitar, both as a rhythm instrument using simple repetitive riffs and as a solo lead instrument, and was more likely to be used with distortion and other effects. Key acts included British Invasion bands like The Who and The Kinks, as well as psychedelic era performers like Cream, Jimi Hendrix and The Jeff Beck Group and American bands including Iron Butterfly, MC5, Blue Cheer and Vanilla Fudge. Hard rock-influenced bands that enjoyed international success in the 1970s included Montrose, including the instrumental talent of Ronnie Montrose and vocals of Sammy Hagar and arguably the first all-American hard rock band to challenge the British dominance of the genre, released their first album in 1973, and were followed by bands like Aerosmith.

=== Early heavy metal ===
From the late 1960s the term heavy metal began to be used to describe some hard rock played with even more volume and intensity, first as an adjective and by the early 1970s as a noun. The term was first used in music in Steppenwolf's "Born to be Wild" (1967) and began to be associated with pioneer bands like Boston's Blue Cheer and Michigan's Grand Funk Railroad. By 1970 three key British bands had developed the characteristic sounds and styles which would help shape the subgenre. Led Zeppelin added elements of fantasy to their riff laden blues-rock, Deep Purple brought in symphonic and medieval interests from their progressive rock phrase and Black Sabbath introduced facets of the gothic and modal harmony, helping to produce a "darker" sound. These elements were taken up by a "second generation" of heavy metal bands into the late 1970s, including Kiss, Ted Nugent and Blue Öyster Cult from the US. Despite a lack of airplay and very little presence on the singles charts, late-1970s heavy metal built a considerable following, particularly among adolescent working-class males in North America and Europe.

=== Christian rock ===
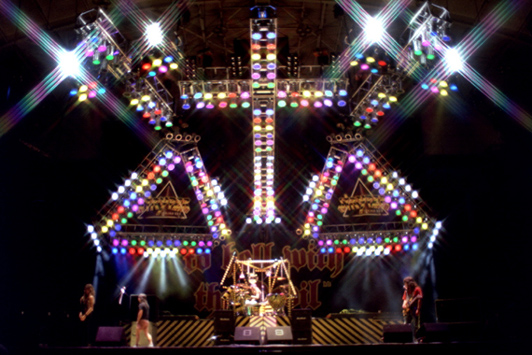
Stryper on stage in 1986

Rock has been criticized by some Christian religious leaders, who have condemned it as immoral, anti-Christian and even demonic. However, Christian rock began to develop in the late 1960s, particularly out of the Jesus movement beginning in Southern California, and emerged as a subgenre in the 1970s with artists like Larry Norman, usually seen as the first major "star" of Christian rock. The genre has been particularly popular in the United States. Many Christian rock performers have ties to the contemporary Christian music scene, while other bands and artists are closely linked to independent music. Since the 1980s Christian rock performers have gained mainstream success, including figures such as the American gospel-to-pop crossover artist Amy Grant. While these artists were largely acceptable in Christian communities the adoption of heavy rock and glam metal styles by bands like Petra and Stryper, who achieved considerable mainstream success in the 1980s, was more controversial. From the 1990s there were increasing numbers of acts who attempted to avoid the Christian band label, preferring to be seen as groups who were also Christians, including P.O.D and Collective Soul.

== Punk and its aftermath (mid-1970s to the 1980s) ==
=== Punk rock ===
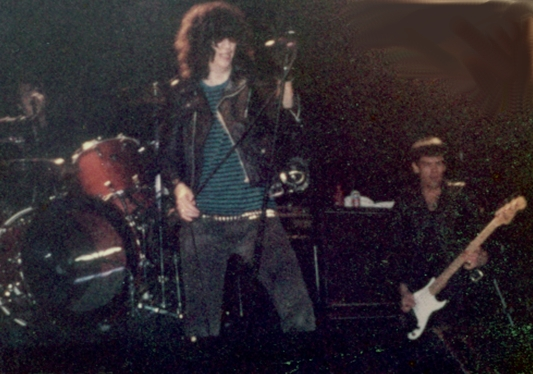
Joey and Dee Dee Ramone in concert in 1983

Punk rock was developed between 1974 and 1976 in the United States and the United Kingdom. Rooted in garage rock and other forms of what is now known as protopunk music, punk rock bands eschewed the perceived excesses of mainstream 1970s rock. They created fast, hard-edged music, typically with short songs, stripped-down instrumentation, and often political, anti-establishment lyrics. Punk embraces a DIY (do it yourself) ethic, with many bands self-producing their recordings and distributing them through informal channels. By late 1976, acts such as the Ramones and Patti Smith, in New York City, and the Sex Pistols and The Clash, in London, were recognized as the vanguard of a new musical movement. The following year saw punk rock spreading around the world. For the most part, punk took root in local scenes that tended to reject association with the mainstream. An associated punk subculture emerged, expressing youthful rebellion and characterized by distinctive clothing styles and a variety of anti-authoritarian ideologies. Since punk rock's initial popularity in the 1970s and the renewed interest created by the punk revival of the 1990s, punk rock continues to have a strong underground following. A more extreme variation of punk rock, hardcore punk emerged from local scenes, particularly in Los Angeles and New York and taking root in Washington DC, Boston, and San Francisco. With louder, faster and usually shorter songs with shouted or screamed vocals it spawned bands like the Dead Kennedys, Minor Threat and Black Flag.

=== New wave ===
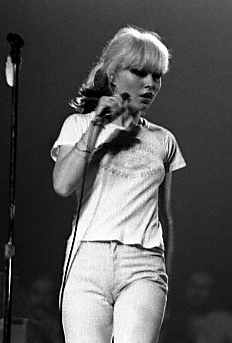
Deborah Harry from the band Blondie, performing at Maple Leaf Gardens in Toronto in 1977

Although punk rock was a significant social and musical phenomenon, it achieved less in the way of record sales, or American radio airplay (as the radio scene continued to be dominated by mainstream formats such as disco and album-oriented rock). Punk rock had attracted devotees from the art and collegiate world and soon bands sporting a more literate, arty approach, such as Talking Heads, and Devo began to infiltrate the punk scene; in some quarters the description "New Wave" began to be used to differentiate these less overtly punk bands. Record executives, who had been mostly mystified by the punk movement, recognized the potential of the more accessible New Wave acts and began aggressively signing and marketing any band that could claim a remote connection to punk or new wave. Many of these bands, such as The Cars, The Runaways and The Go-Go's can be seen as pop bands marketed as new wave; other existing acts, while "skinny tie" bands exemplified by The Knack, or the photogenic Blondie, began as punk acts and moved into more commercial territory.

=== Post-punk ===
If hardcore most directly pursued the stripped down aesthetic of punk, and new wave came to represent its commercial wing, post-punk emerged in the later 1970s and early 80s as its more artistic and challenging side. Major influences beside punk bands were The Velvet Underground, The Who, Frank Zappa and Captain Beefheart, and the New York-based no wave scene which placed an emphasis on performance, including bands such as James Chance and the Contortions, DNA and Sonic Youth. Early contributors to the genre included the US bands Pere Ubu, Devo, The Residents and Talking Heads. Although many post-punk bands continued to record and perform, it declined as a movement in the mid-1980s as acts disbanded or moved off to explore other musical other areas, but it has continued to influence the development of rock music and has been seen as a major element in the creation of the alternative rock movement.

=== Glam and extreme metal ===
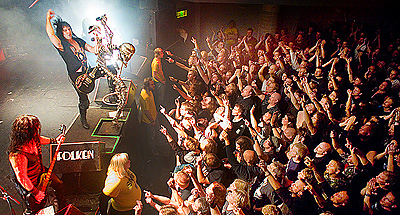
W.A.S.P. performing live in Stavanger, Norway in 2006

In the late 1970s Eddie Van Halen established himself as a metal guitar virtuoso after his band's self-titled 1978 album. Inspired by Van Halen's success and the new wave of British heavy metal, a metal scene began to develop in Southern California from the late 1970s, based on the clubs of L.A.'s Sunset Strip and including such bands as Quiet Riot, Ratt, Mötley Crüe, and W.A.S.P., who, along with similarly styled acts such as New York's Twisted Sister, incorporated the theatrics (and sometimes makeup) of glam rock acts like Alice Cooper and Kiss. The lyrics of these glam metal bands characteristically emphasized hedonism and wild behavior and musically were distinguished by rapid-fire shred guitar solos, anthemic choruses, and a relatively melodic, pop-oriented approach. By the mid-1980s bands were beginning to emerge from the L.A. scene that pursued a less glam image and a rawer sound, particularly Guns N' Roses, breaking through with the chart-topping Appetite for Destruction (1987), and Jane's Addiction, who emerged with their major label debut Nothing's Shocking, the following year.

In the late 1980s metal fragmented into several subgenres, including thrash metal, which developed in the US from the style known as speed metal, under the influence of hardcore punk, with low-register guitar riffs typically overlaid by shredding leads. Lyrics often expressed nihilistic views or deal with social issues using visceral, gory language. It was popularised by the "Big Four of Thrash": Metallica, Anthrax, Megadeth, and Slayer. Death metal developed out of thrash, particularly influenced by the bands Venom and Slayer. Florida's Death and the Bay Area's Possessed emphasized lyrical elements of blasphemy, diabolism and millenarianism, with vocals usually delivered as guttural "death growls", high-pitched screaming, complemented by downtuned, highly distorted guitars and extremely fast double bass percussion.

=== Heartland rock ===
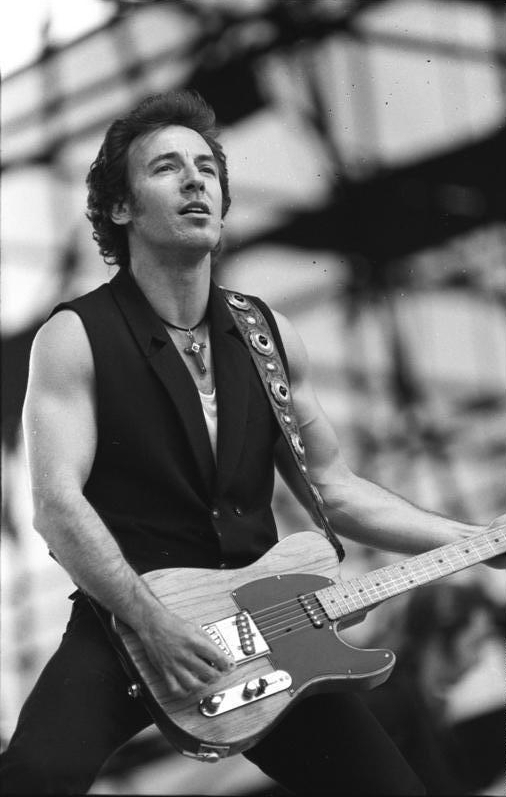
Bruce Springsteen performing in East Berlin in 1988

American working-class oriented heartland rock, characterized by a straightforward musical style, and a concern with the lives of ordinary, blue collar American people, developed in the second half of the 1970s. The term heartland rock was first used to describe Midwestern arena rock groups like Kansas, REO Speedwagon and Styx, but which came to be associated with a more socially concerned form of roots rock more directly influenced by folk, country and rock and roll. It has been seen as an American Midwest and Rust Belt counterpart to West Coast country rock and the Southern rock of the American South. Led by figures who had initially been identified with punk and new wave, it was most strongly influenced by acts such as Bob Dylan, The Byrds, Creedence Clearwater Revival and Van Morrison, and the basic rock of 60s garage and the Rolling Stones.

Exemplified by the commercial success of singer songwriters Bruce Springsteen, Bob Seger, and Tom Petty, along with less widely known acts such as Southside Johnny and the Asbury Jukes and Joe Grushecky and the Houserockers, it was partly a reaction to post-industrial urban decline in the East and Mid-West, often dwelling on issues of social disintegration and isolation, beside a form of good-time rock and roll revivalism. The genre reached its commercial, artistic and influential peak in the mid-1980s, with Springsteen's Born in the USA (1984), topping the charts worldwide and spawning a series of top ten singles, together with the arrival of artists including John Mellencamp, Steve Earle and more gentle singer/songwriters as Bruce Hornsby. It can also be heard as an influence on artists as diverse as Billy Joel and Tracy Chapman.

Heartland rock faded away as a recognized genre by the early 1990s, as rock music in general, and blue collar and white working class themes in particular, lost influence with younger audiences, and as heartland's artists turned to more personal works. Many heartland rock artists continue to record today with critical and commercial success, most notably Bruce Springsteen and John Mellencamp, although their works have become more personal and experimental and no longer fit easily into a single genre. Newer artists whose music would perhaps have been labelled heartland rock had it been released in the 1970s or 1980s, such as Missouri's Bottle Rockets and Illinois' Uncle Tupelo, found themselves labeled alt-country.

=== Emergence of alternative rock ===
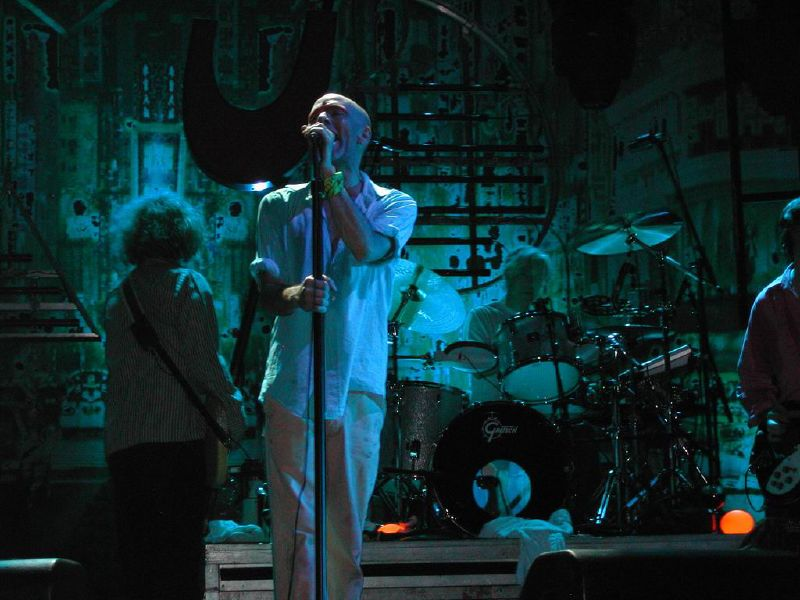
R.E.M. was a successful alternative rock band in the 1980s

The term alternative rock was coined in the early 1980s to describe rock artists who did not fit into the mainstream genres of the time. Bands dubbed "alternative" had no unified style, but were all seen as distinct from mainstream music. Alternative bands were linked by their collective debt to punk rock, through hardcore, New Wave or the post-punk movements. Important bands of the 1980s alternative movement in the US included R.E.M., Hüsker Dü, Jane's Addiction, Sonic Youth and the Pixies. Artists were largely confined to independent record labels, building an extensive underground music scene based on college radio, fanzines, touring, and word-of-mouth. Few of these bands, with the exception of R.E.M., achieved mainstream success, but despite a lack of spectacular album sales, they exerted a considerable influence on the generation of musicians who came of age in the 80s and ended up breaking through to mainstream success in the 1990s. Styles of alternative rock in the U.S. during the 1980s included jangle pop, associated with the early recordings of R.E.M., which incorporated the ringing guitars of mid-1960s pop and rock, and college rock, used to describe alternative bands that began in the college circuit and college radio, including acts such as 10,000 Maniacs and The Feelies.

== Alternative goes mainstream (the 1990s) ==
=== Grunge ===
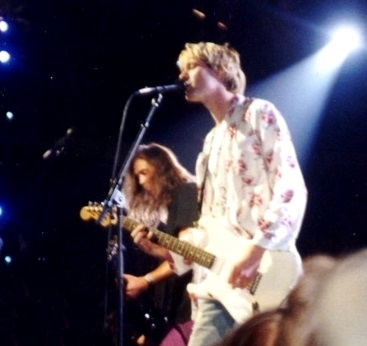
The grunge group Nirvana in 1992. They popularized grunge worldwide

By the early 1990s, rock was dominated by commercialized and highly produced pop, rock, and "hair metal" artists, while MTV had arrived and promoted a focus on image and style. Disaffected by this trend, in the mid-1980s, bands in Washington state (particularly in the Seattle area) formed a new style of rock which sharply contrasted with the mainstream music of the time. The developing genre came to be known as "grunge", a term descriptive of the dirty sound of the music and the unkempt appearance of most musicians, who actively rebelled against the over-groomed images of popular artists. Grunge fused elements of hardcore punk and heavy metal into a single sound, and made heavy use of guitar distortion, fuzz and feedback. The lyrics were typically apathetic and angst-filled, and often concerned themes such as social alienation and entrapment, although it was also known for its dark humor and parodies of commercial rock.

Bands such as Green River, Soundgarden, the Melvins and Skin Yard pioneered the genre, with Mudhoney becoming the most successful by the end of the decade. However, grunge remained largely a local phenomenon until 1991, when Nirvana‘s Nevermind became a huge success thanks to the lead single "Smells Like Teen Spirit". Nevermind was more melodic than its predecessors, but the band refused to employ traditional corporate promotion and marketing mechanisms. During 1991 and 1992, other grunge albums such as Pearl Jam's Ten, Soundgarden's Badmotorfinger and Alice in Chains' Dirt, along with the Temple of the Dog album featuring members of Pearl Jam and Soundgarden, became among the 100 top selling albums. The popular breakthrough of these grunge bands prompted Rolling Stone to nickname Seattle "the new Liverpool." Major record labels signed most of the remaining grunge bands in Seattle, while a second influx of acts moved to the city in the hope of success. However, with the death of Kurt Cobain and the subsequent break-up of Nirvana in 1994, touring problems for Pearl Jam and the departure of Alice in Chains' lead singer Layne Staley in 1996, the genre began to decline, partly to be overshadowed by Britpop and more commercial sounding post-grunge.

=== Post-grunge ===
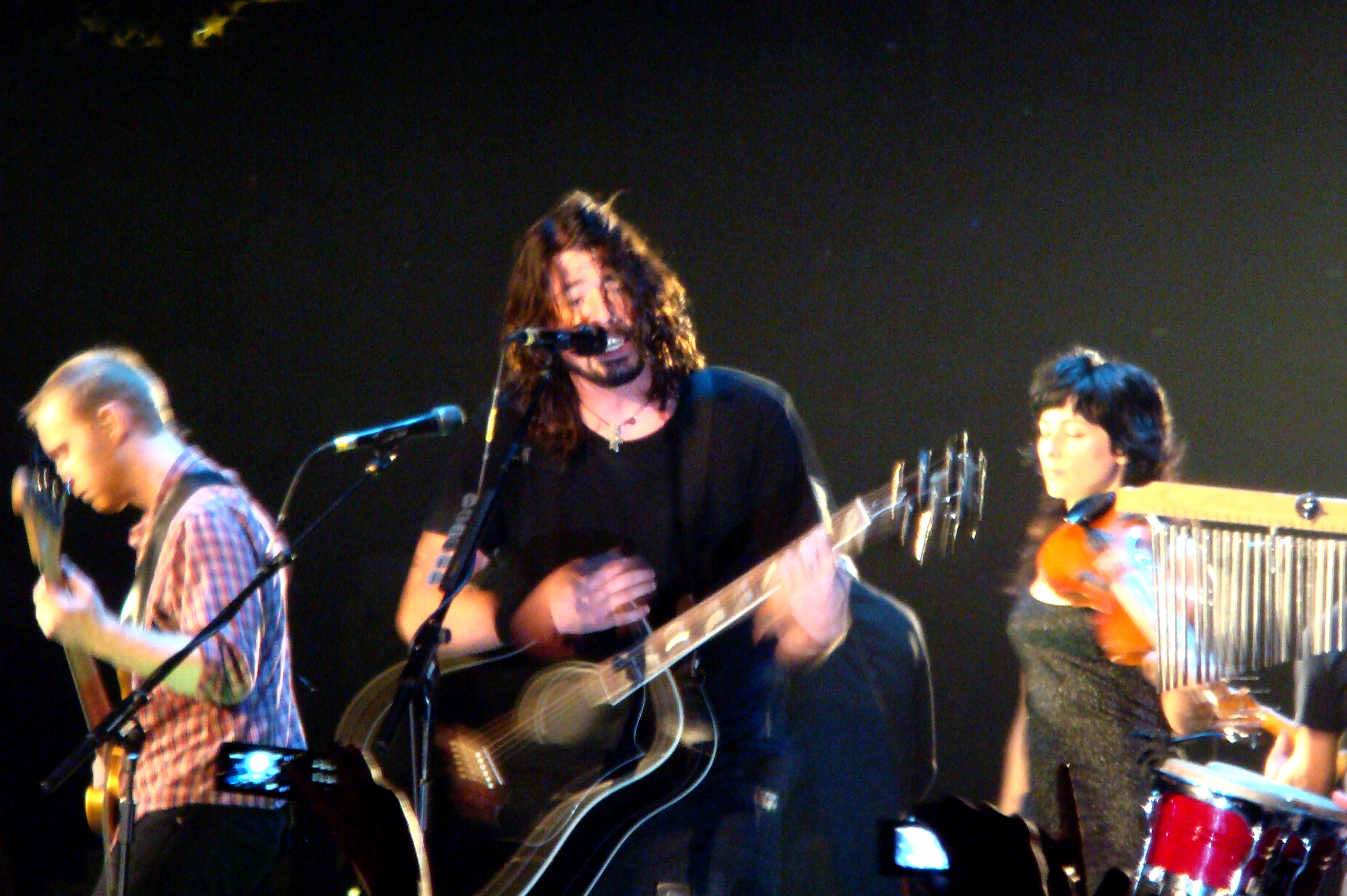
Foo Fighters performing an acoustic show

The term post-grunge was coined for the generation of bands that followed the emergence into the mainstream, and subsequent hiatus, of the Seattle grunge bands. Post-grunge bands emulated their attitudes and music, but with a more radio-friendly commercially oriented sound. Often they worked through the major labels and came to incorporate diverse influences from hard rock, pop rock, or alternative metal. The term post-grunge was originally meant as a pejorative, suggesting these groups were simply musically derivative, or a cynical response to an "authentic" rock movement. From 1995, former Nirvana drummer Dave Grohl's new band, the Foo Fighters, helped popularize the post-grunge genre and define a new era of rock.

Some post-grunge bands, like Candlebox, were from Seattle, but the subgenre was marked by a broadening of the geographical base of grunge, with bands like Pennsylvania's Live and Georgia's Collective Soul, who all cemented post-grunge as one of the most commercially viable subgenres of the 1990s. Bands like Creed and Nickelback took post-grunge into the 21st century with considerable commercial success, abandoning most of the angst and anger of the original movement for more conventional anthems, narratives, and romantic songs, and were followed in this vein by new acts including Shinedown, Seether and 3 Doors Down.

=== Pop punk ===
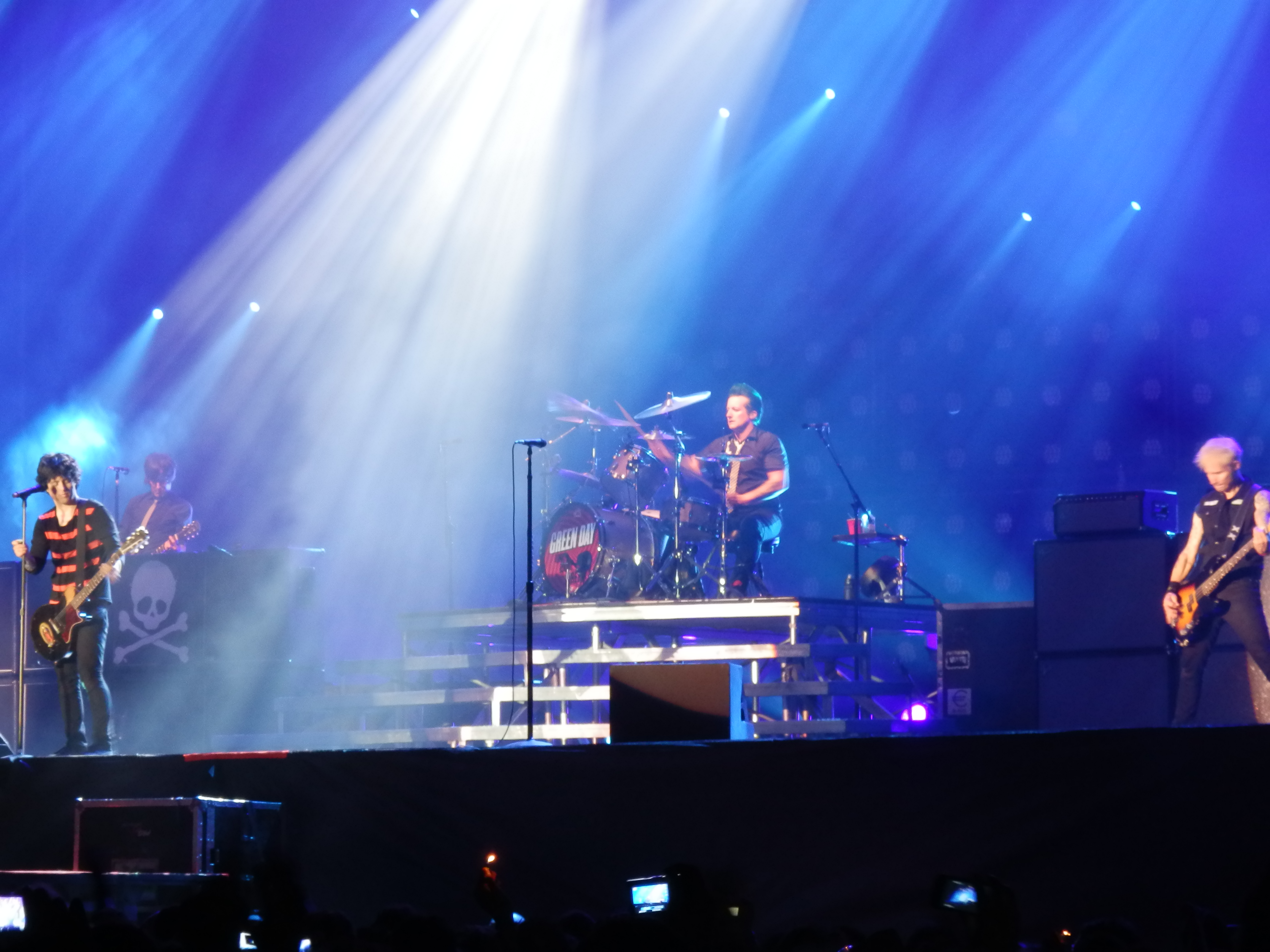
Green Day performing in 2013

The origins of 1990s punk pop can be seen in the more song-oriented bands of the 1970s punk movement like The Buzzcocks and The Clash, commercially successful new wave acts such as The Jam and The Undertones, and the more hardcore-influenced elements of alternative rock in the 1980s. Pop-punk tends to use power-pop melodies and chord changes with speedy punk tempos and loud guitars. Punk music provided the inspiration for some California-based bands on independent labels in the early 1990s, including Rancid, Pennywise, Weezer and Green Day. In 1994 Green Day moved to a major label and produced the album Dookie, which found a new, largely teenage, audience and proved a surprise diamond-selling success, leading to a series of hit singles, including two number ones in the US. They were soon followed by the eponymous début from Weezer, which spawned three top ten singles in the US. This success opened the door for the multi-platinum sales of metallic punk band The Offspring with Smash (1994). This second wave of pop punk reached its commercial peak with Green Day's Nimrod (1997) and The Offspring's Americana (1998).

A third wave of punk pop was spearheaded by Blink-182, with their breakthrough album Enema of the State (1999), followed by bands such as Good Charlotte, Bowling for Soup and Sum 41, who made use of humour in their videos and had a more radio-friendly tone to their music, while retaining the speed, some of the attitude and even the look of 1970s punk. Later pop-punk bands, including Simple Plan, All-American Rejects and Fall Out Boy, had a sound that has been described as closer to 1980s hardcore, while still achieving considerable commercial success.

=== Indie rock ===
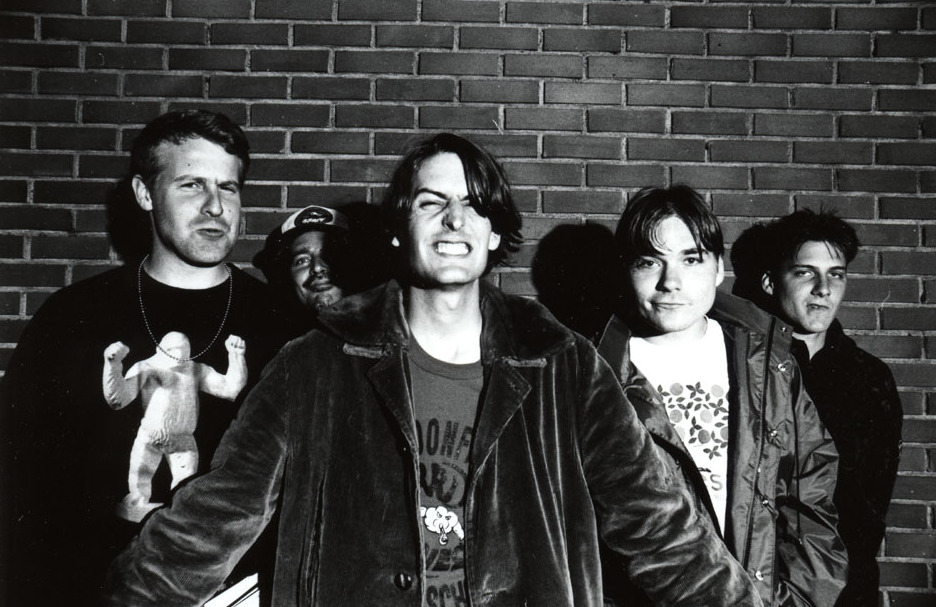
Lo-fi indie rock band Pavement

In the 1980s the terms indie rock and alternative rock were used interchangeably. By the mid-1990s, as elements of the movement began to attract mainstream interest, particularly grunge and then Britpop, post-grunge and pop-punk, the term alternative began to lose its meaning. Those bands following the less commercial contours of the scene were increasingly referred to by the label indie. They characteristically attempted to retain control of their careers by releasing albums on their own or small independent labels, while relying on touring, word-of-mouth, and airplay on independent or college radio stations for promotion. Linked by an ethos more than a musical approach, the indie rock movement encompassed a wide range of styles, from hard-edged, grunge influenced bands like Superchunk, through do-it-yourself experimental bands like Pavement, to punk-folk singers such as Ani DiFranco. It has been noted that indie rock has a relatively high proportion of female artists compared with preceding rock genres, a tendency exemplified by the development of feminist-informed Riot Grrrl music.

By the end of the 1990s many recognisable subgenres, most with their origins in the late 80s alternative movement, were included under the umbrella of indie. Lo-fi eschewed polished recording techniques for a D.I.Y. ethos and was spearheaded by Beck, Sebadoh and Pavement. The work of Talk Talk and Slint helped inspire both post rock, an experimental style influenced by jazz and electronic music, taken up by acts such as Tortoise, as well as leading to more dense and complex, guitar-based math rock, developed by acts like Polvo and Chavez. Sadcore emphasised pain and suffering through melodic use of acoustic and electronic instrumentation in the music of bands like American Music Club and Red House Painters, while the revival of Baroque pop reacted against lo-fi and experimental music by placing an emphasis on melody and classical instrumentation, with artists like Rufus Wainright.

=== Alternative metal, rap rock and nu metal ===
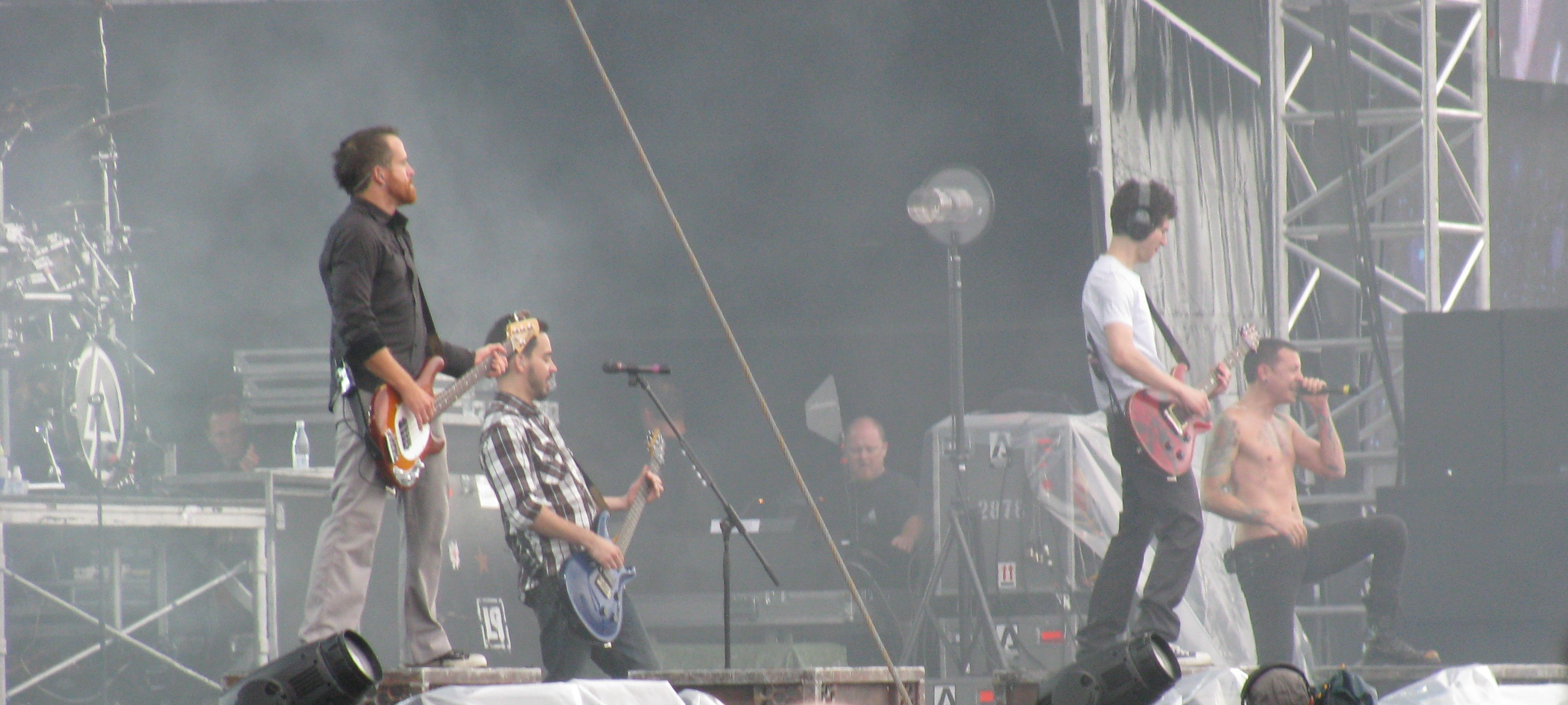
Linkin Park performing at 2009 Sonisphere Festival in Pori, Finland

Alternative metal emerged from the hardcore scene of alternative rock in the US in the later 1980s, but gained a wider audience after grunge broke into the mainstream in the early 1990s. Early alternative metal bands mixed a wide variety of genres with hardcore and heavy metal sensibilities, with acts like Jane's Addiction and Primus using prog-rock, Soundgarden and Corrosion of Conformity using garage punk, The Jesus Lizard and Helmet mixing noise-rock, Ministry and Nine Inch Nails influenced by industrial music, Monster Magnet moving into psychedelia, Pantera and White Zombie creating groove metal, while Biohazard and Faith No More turned to hip hop and rap.

Hip hop had gained attention from rock acts in the early 1980s, including The Clash with "The Magnificent Seven" (1981) and Blondie with "Rapture" (1981). Early crossover acts included Run DMC and the Beastie Boys. Detroit rapper Esham became known for his "acid rap" style, which fused rapping with a sound that was often based in rock and heavy metal. Rappers who sampled rock songs included Ice-T, The Fat Boys, LL Cool J, Public Enemy and Whodini. The mixing of thrash metal and rap was pioneered by Anthrax on their 1987 comedy-influenced single "I'm the Man".

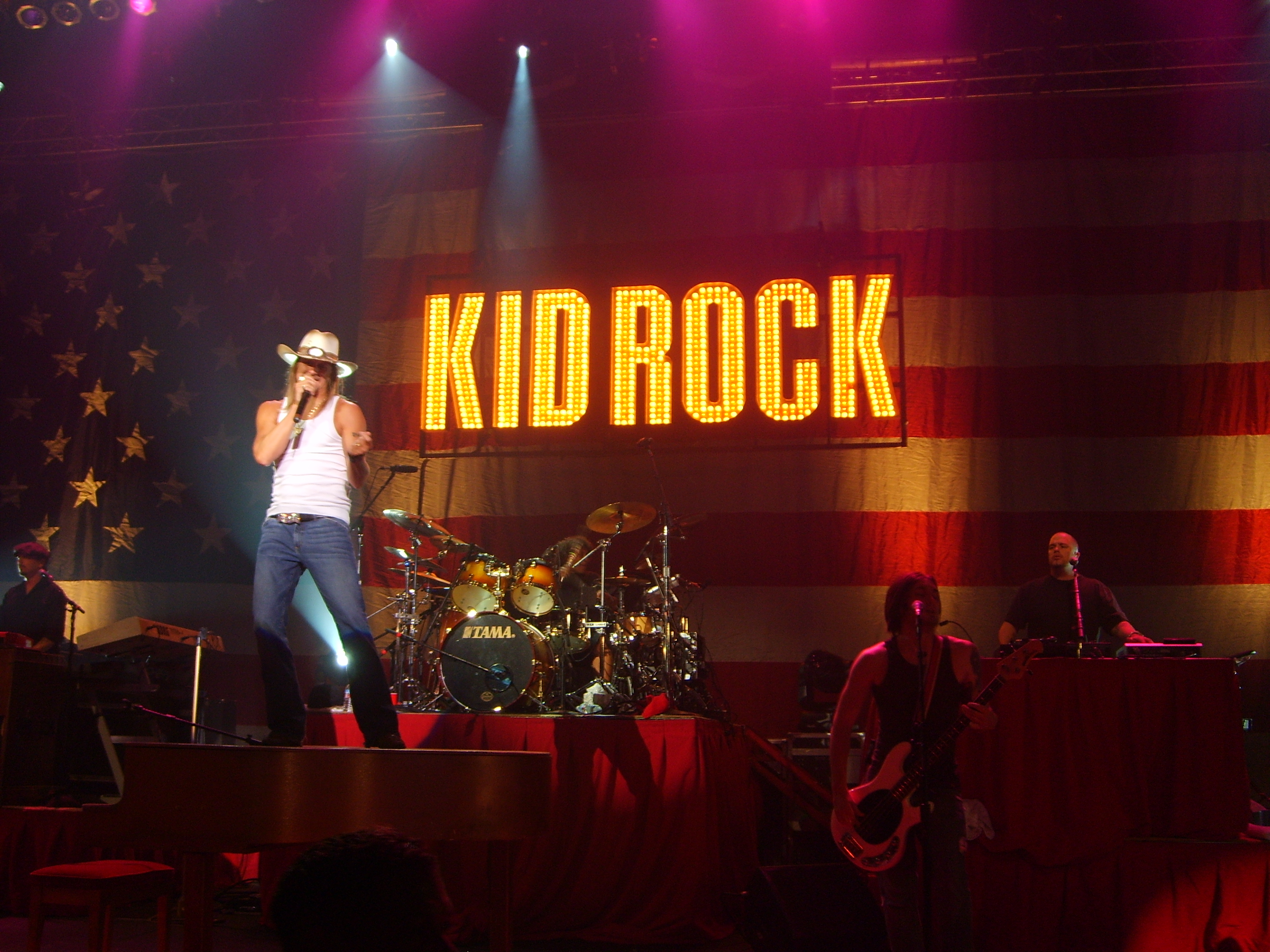
Kid Rock in concert in 2006

In 1990, Faith No More broke into the mainstream with their single "Epic', often seen as the first truly successful combination of heavy metal with rap. This paved the way for the success of existing bands like 24-7 Spyz and Living Colour, and new acts including Rage Against the Machine and Red Hot Chili Peppers, who all fused rock and hip hop among other influences. Among the first wave of performers to gain mainstream success as rap rock were 311, Bloodhound Gang, and Kid Rock. A more metallic sound – nu metal – was pursued by bands including Limp Bizkit, Korn and Slipknot. Later in the decade this style, which contained a mix of grunge, punk, metal, rap and turntable scratching, spawned a wave of successful bands like Linkin Park, P.O.D. and Staind, who were often classified as rap metal or nu metal, the first of which are the best-selling band of the genre.

In 2001, nu metal reached its peak with albums like Staind's Break the Cycle, P.O.D's Satellite, Slipknot's Iowa and Linkin Park's Hybrid Theory. New bands also emerged like Disturbed, post-grunge-hard rock band Godsmack and Breaking Benjamin, and even Papa Roach, whose major label début Infest became a platinum hit. However, by 2002 there were signs that nu metal's mainstream popularity was weakening. Korn's fifth album Untouchables, and Papa Roach's second album Lovehatetragedy, did not sell as well as their previous releases, while nu metal bands were played more infrequently on rock radio stations and MTV began focusing on pop punk and emo. However, Korn's album Untouchables went platinum and its single "Here to Stay" peaked at number 72 on the Billboard Hot 100 and peaked at number one on MTV's Total Request Live twice. Also, nu metal band Evanescence became extremely popular in 2003 and Linkin Park continued having much mainstream success. After the early 2000s, many nu metal bands changed their style, with alternative rock, post-grunge, hard rock and standard heavy metal being examples of the genres nu metal bands changed to.

== New millennium (the 2000s) ==
=== Emo ===
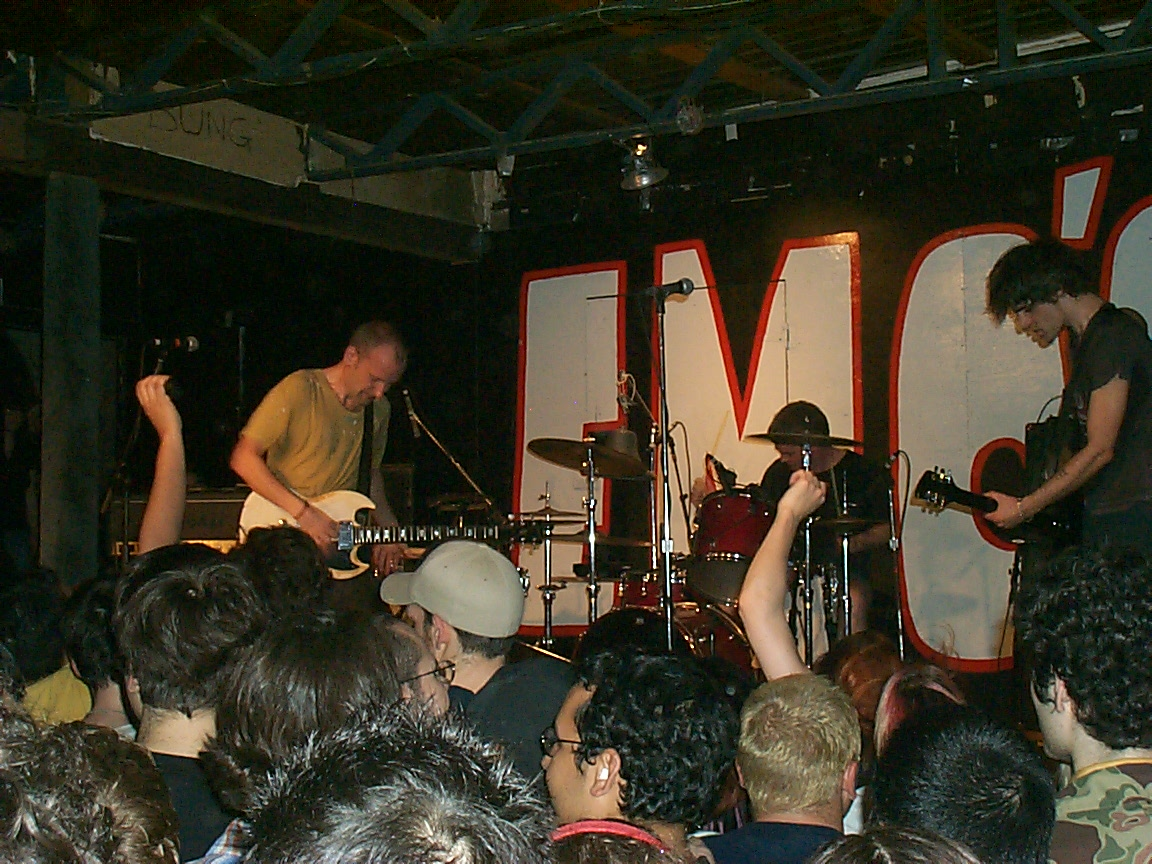
Fugazi performing in 2002

Emo emerged from the hardcore scene in 1980s Washington, D.C., initially as "emocore", used as a term to describe bands who favored expressive vocals over the more common abrasive, barking style. The style was pioneered by bands Rites of Spring and Embrace, the last formed by Ian MacKaye, whose Dischord Records became a major centre for the emerging D.C. emo scene, releasing work by Rites of Spring, Dag Nasty, Nation of Ulysses and Fugazi. Fugazi emerged as the definitive early emo band, gaining a fanbase among alternative rock followers, not least for their overtly anti-commercial stance. The early emo scene operated as an underground, with short-lived bands releasing small-run vinyl records on tiny independent labels. The mid-90s sound of emo was defined by bands like Jawbreaker and Sunny Day Real Estate who incorporated elements of grunge and more melodic rock. Only after the breakthrough of grunge and pop punk into the mainstream did emo come to wider attention with the success of Weezer's Pinkerton (1996) album, which used pop punk. Late 1990s bands drew on the work of Fugazi, SDRE, Jawbreaker and Weezer, including The Promise Ring, Get Up Kids, Braid, Texas Is the Reason, Joan of Arc, Jets to Brazil and most successfully Jimmy Eat World, and by the end of the millennium it was one of the more popular indie styles in the US.

Emo broke into mainstream culture in the early 2000s with the platinum-selling success of Jimmy Eat World's Bleed American (2001) and Dashboard Confessional's The Places You Have Come to Fear the Most (2003). The new emo had a far greater appeal amongst adolescents than its earlier incarnations. At the same time, use of the term emo expanded beyond the musical genre, becoming associated with fashion, a hairstyle and any music that expressed emotion. The term emo has been applied by critics and journalists to a variety of artists, including multi-platinum acts such as Fall Out Boy and My Chemical Romance and disparate groups such as Paramore and Panic! at the Disco, even when they protest the label.

=== Garage rock/post-punk revival ===
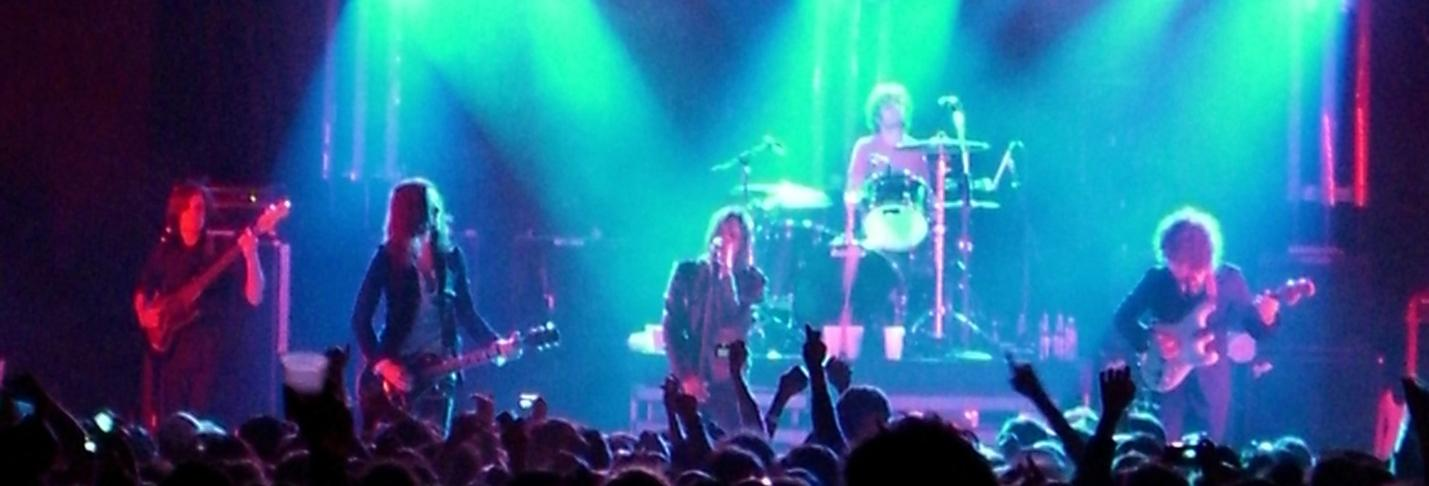
The Strokes performing in 2006

In the early 2000s, a new group of bands that played a stripped down and back-to-basics version of guitar rock, emerged into the mainstream. They were variously characterised as part of a garage rock, post-punk or new wave revival. There had been attempts to revive garage rock and elements of punk in the 1980s and 1990s and by 2000 several local scenes had grown up in the US. The Detroit rock scene included: The Von Bondies, Electric Six, The Dirtbombs and The Detroit Cobras and that of New York: Radio 4, Yeah Yeah Yeahs and The Rapture.

The commercial breakthrough from these scenes was led by bands including The Strokes, who emerged from the New York club scene with their début album Is This It (2001) and The White Stripes, from Detroit, with their third album White Blood Cells (2001). They were christened by the media as the "The" bands, and dubbed "The saviours of rock 'n' roll", leading to accusations of hype. A second wave of bands that managed to gain international recognition as a result of the movement included Black Rebel Motorcycle Club, The Killers, Interpol, the Black Keys and Kings of Leon from the US.

=== Metalcore and contemporary heavy metal ===
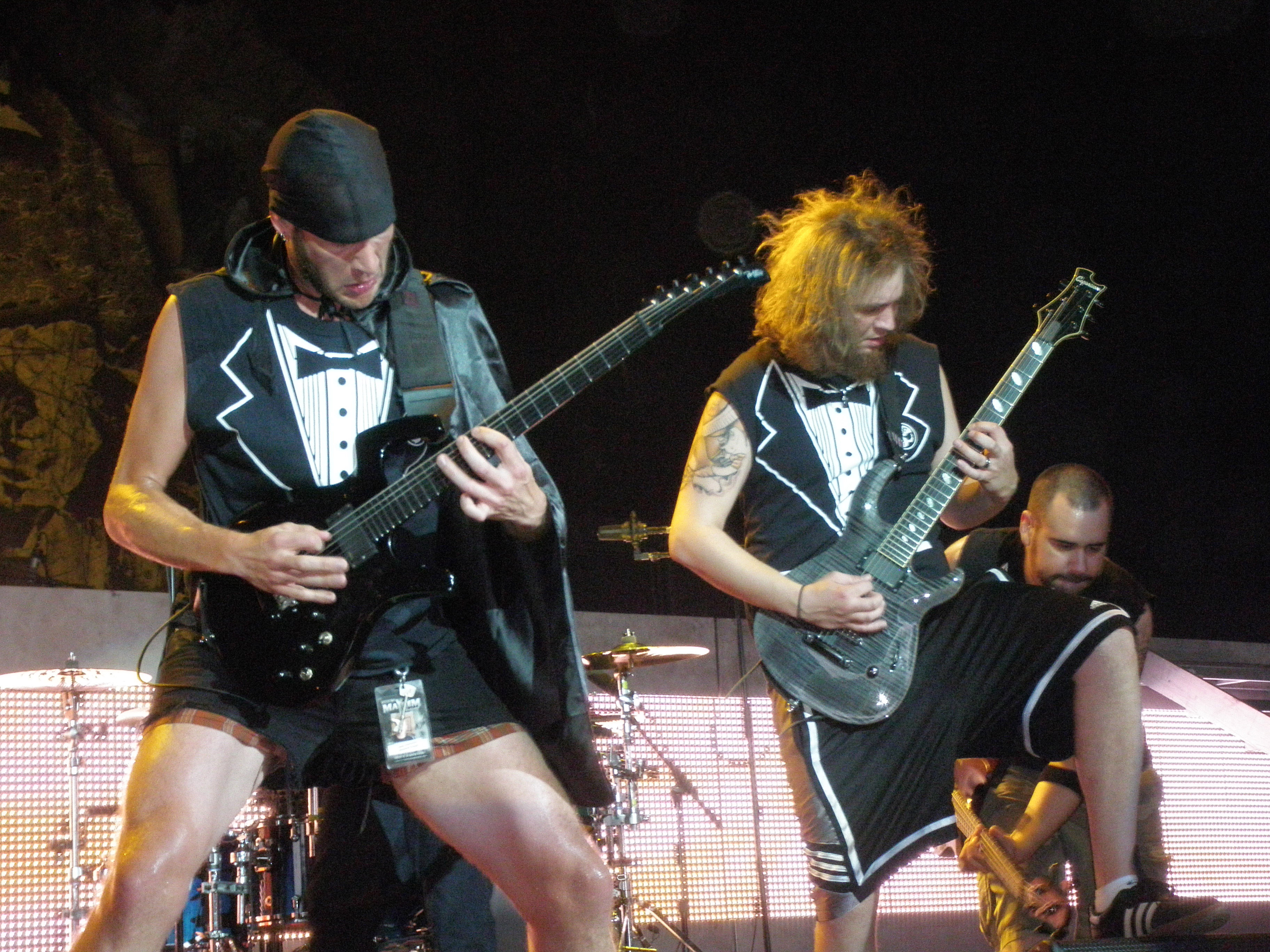
Members of Killswitch Engage on stage in 2009

Metalcore, originally an American hybrid of thrash metal and hardcore punk, emerged as a commercial force in the mid-2000s. It was rooted in the crossover thrash style developed two decades earlier by bands such as Suicidal Tendencies, Dirty Rotten Imbeciles, and Stormtroopers of Death and remained an underground phenomenon through the 1990s. By 2004, melodic metalcore, influenced by melodic death metal, was sufficiently popular for Killswitch Engage's The End of Heartache and Shadows Fall's The War Within to debut at number 21 and number 20, respectively, on the Billboard album chart. Lamb of God, with a related blend of metal styles, hit the number 2 spot on the Billboard charts in 2009 with Wrath. The success of these bands and others such as Trivium, who have released both metalcore and straight-ahead thrash albums, and Mastodon, who played in a progressive/sludge style, inspired claims of a metal revival in the United States, dubbed by some critics the "New Wave of American Heavy Metal".

=== Digital electronic rock ===
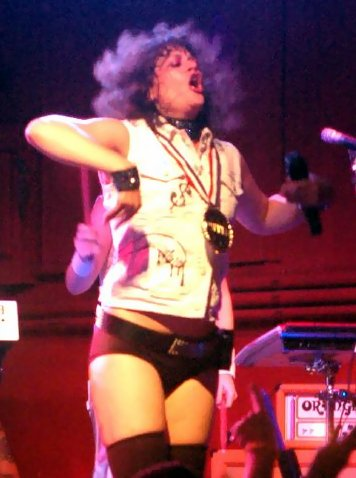
Peaches performing in August 2006

In the 2000s, as computer technology became more accessible and music software advanced, it became possible to create high quality music using little more than a single laptop computer. This resulted in a massive increase in the amount of home-produced electronic music available to the general public via the expanding internet, and new forms of performance such as laptronica and live coding. These techniques also began to be used by existing bands, as with industrial rock act Nine Inch Nails' album Year Zero (2007), and by developing genres that mixed rock with digital techniques and sounds, including indie electronic, electroclash and dance-punk.

Indie electronic, which had begun in the early 1990s with bands like Stereolab and Disco Inferno, took off in the new millennium as the new digital technology developed, with acts including The Postal Service, and Ratatat from the US, mixing a variety of indie sounds with electronic music, largely produced on small independent labels. The Electroclash subgenre began in New York at the end of the 1990s, combining synth pop, techno, punk and performance art. It was pioneered by I-F with their track "Space Invaders Are Smoking Grass" (1998), and pursued by artists including Felix da Housecat and Peaches. It gained international attention at the beginning of the new millennium, but rapidly faded as a recognisable genre. Dance-punk, mixing post-punk sounds with disco and funk, had developed in the 1980s, but it was revived among some bands of the garage rock/post-punk revival in the early years of the new millennium, particularly among New York acts such as Liars, The Rapture and Radio 4, joined by dance-oriented acts who adopted rock sounds such as Out Hud.

== See also ==
- Chicano rock

== Notes ==
=== Sources ===
- Bogdanov, V.; Woodstra, C.; Erlewine, S. T. (2002). All Music Guide to Rock: the Definitive Guide to Rock, Pop, and Soul (3rd ed.). Milwaukee, WI: Backbeat Books. ISBN 0-87930-653-X.
- Gilliland, John (1969). "Hail, Hail, Rock 'n' Roll: The rock revolution gets underway" (audio). Pop Chronicles. University of North Texas Libraries.
- Sabin, R. (1999). Punk Rock: So What?: the Cultural Legacy of Punk. Abingdon: Routledge. ISBN 0-415-17029-X.
