= The Fifth Estate (band) =

American rock band

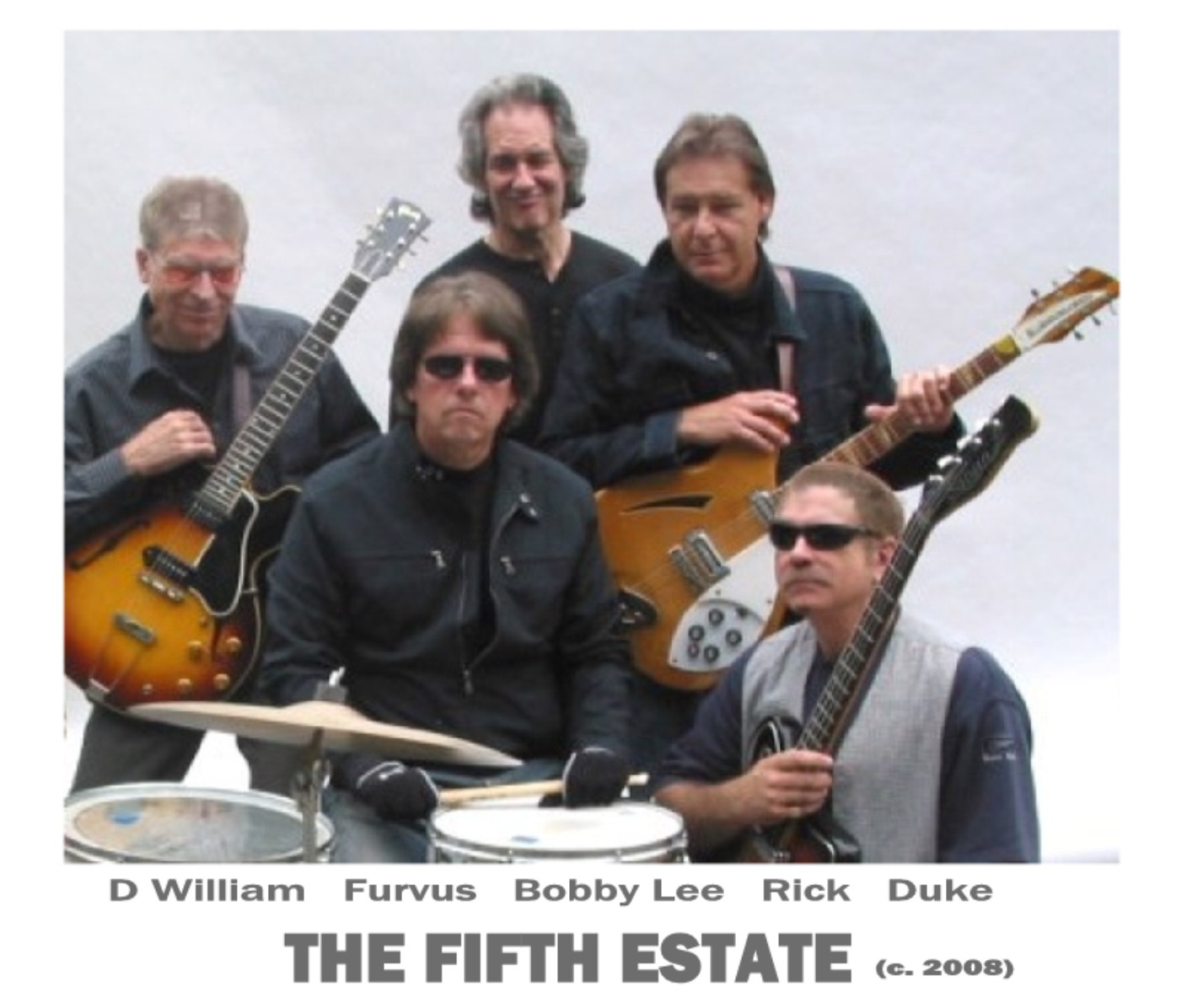

Background information
- Also known as: The D-Men (1963–1965)
- Origin: Stamford, Connecticut, U.S.
- Genres: Garage rock; folk rock; psychedelia
- Years active: 1963–present
- Labels: United Artists; Kapp; Red Bird; Jubilee; Fuel 2000/Universal Music Group; Varèse Sarabande; Overseas: London; EMI; Columbia
- Members: Rick Engler; Bob Klein; Doug Ferrara; Ken Evans; Bill Shute
- Past members: Wayne Wadhams; Chuck LeGrow
- Website: thefifthestateband.com

The Fifth Estate, formerly known as The D-Men, is an American rock band formed in 1963 in Stamford, Connecticut.

== Early years (as The D-Men) ==
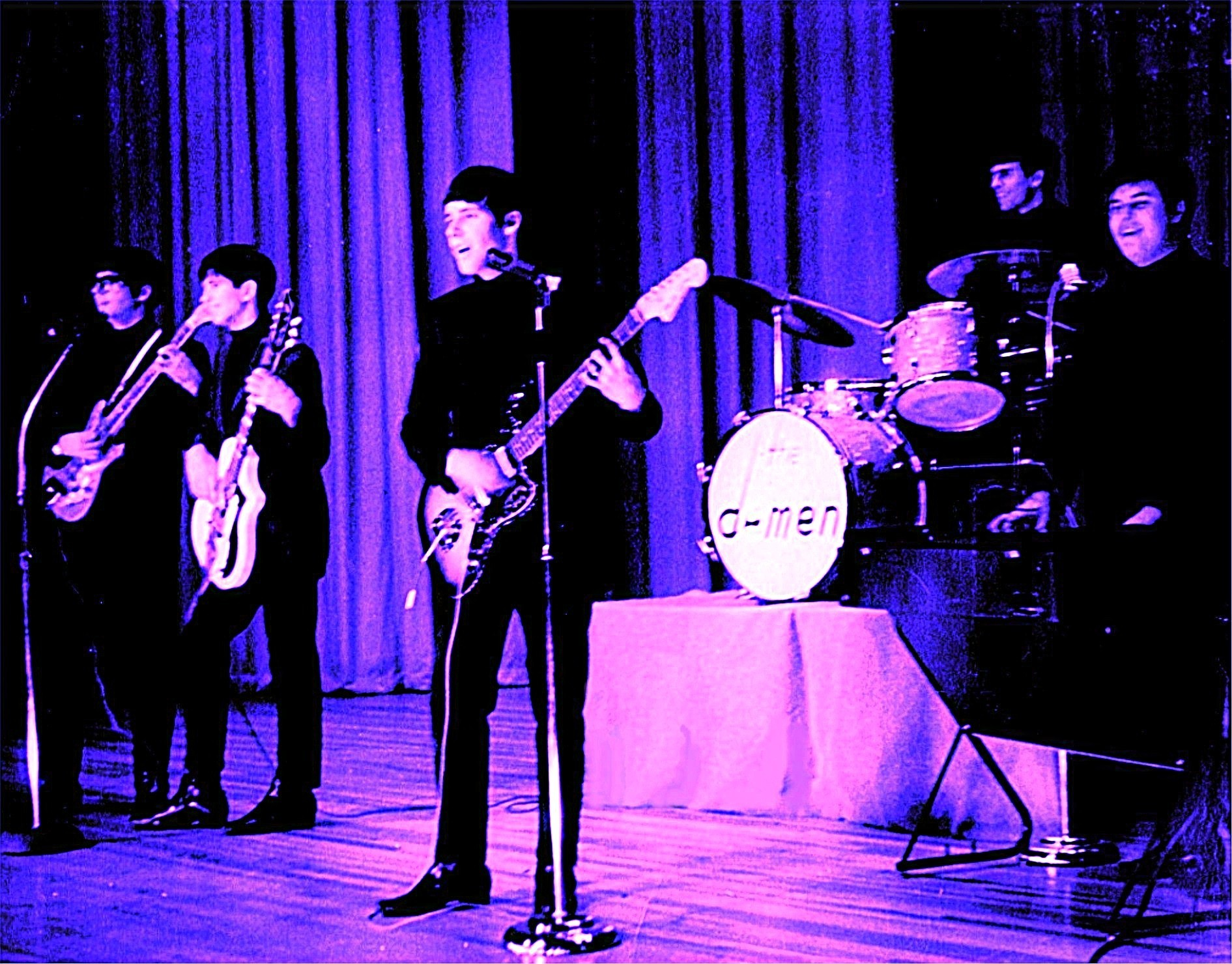
"The D-Men 1964".

The band began in Stamford, Connecticut, in 1963, as The D-Men. Early on, as The D-Men, the band played many small shows and local clubs but soon gravitated to Greenwich Village and larger clubs where they often played six nights a week for long stretches. Guitarist Carl Sabatini also played a role in the band's earliest conception. They released three singles, two on Veep/United Artists and one on the Kapp labels, which along with much of their later material have become collector's items and established them as a central part of the garage rock movement. Boston Skyline released a 28-song collection of their music in 1993 and published a 41-page booklet of their story.

The band made a number of appearances on television, including several on the Clay Cole Show, with one featuring The Rolling Stones’ first American East Coast TV appearance, and Hullabaloo, on which the D-Men performed "I Just Don't Care". The program was at that time co-hosted by Brian Epstein, who expressed an interest in signing them. They later won a Murray the K call-in contest for best new release over The Dave Clark Five and The Animals in 1965. In 1966 they changed their name to "The Fifth Estate".

== The Fifth Estate ==
The Fifth Estate released the single "Love Is All A Game" on the Red Bird label, which became a regional hit. Following a successful string of club performances, they had an international hit in 1967 with a sunshine pop version of "Ding-Dong! The Witch Is Dead", which reached No. 8 on the CHUM Chart and No. 11 on the Billboard Hot 100. The song was recorded and released around the world in five different languages (Japanese, Italian, French, German and English), and incorporated parts of "La Bouree" in the instrumental break and coda from Terpsichore by 17th-century composer Michael Praetorius. According to Cashbox, the track was in the Top 100 record releases of 1967 and achieved the highest American chart position of any Harold Arlen or The Wizard of Oz song. That same year, the group recorded their version of "Heigh Ho!", another film theme from Disney's first feature length film, 1937's Snow White and the Seven Dwarfs. Sales for both "Heigh Ho!" and their next single, "Do Drop Inn", proved less successful with the former charting at No. 24 in Canada and the latter reaching the bottom of the U.S. charts. Although not selling well in America, "Morning Morning", an original song that incorporated the band's core guitar and harpsichord driven sound, was a hit in Australia in 1968 on the Stateside label.

The original five members performed together for six years during which they recorded about 100 songs and released 13 singles and one album. Sam & Dave joined them on stage and sang "Soul Man" with them at one of their theater shows, while one of the Vandellas sang and recorded one of their tunes, "How Can I Find a Way," with them as her next release. They also appeared in a 1967 TV episode of Malibu U. In 1968, on "The Frodis Caper", the last of their 58 television show episodes, the Monkees covered the Fifth Estate's version of "Ding Dong! The Witch Is Dead".

The Fifth Estate toured with acts such as Count Five, the Electric Prunes, the Music Explosion, the Buckinghams, the Ronettes, Gene Pitney, the Lovin' Spoonful, the Turtles, the Byrds and the Easybeats. They also appeared on Upbeat with another Greenwich Village band, the Velvet Underground.

In 1970, group members went off on different projects. Bill Shute released two albums with Lisa Null, The Feathered Maiden and Other Ballads (1977) and American Primitive (1980), and multiple albums with other collaborators. The band has since reformed and continue to perform and record. Their album Time Tunnel was recorded in 2010-2011 and released on January 2, 2012. It was produced with the assistance of and mixed by Shel Talmy.

On September 19, 2012, The Fifth Estate - Anthology 1 was released by Fuel 2000/Universal Music Group. A double CD with a 20-page booklet and 40 songs, more than half the tracks were previously unreleased.

In May, 2014, the German label Break-A-Way Records released a 14-song vinyl album of the band's early 1964-1966 material called I Wanna Shout!

On August 12, 2014, following the continued success of the 2012 Anthology 1 release, Fuel 2000 released a 14-song CD of new material, Take The Fifth. This album was also mixed and executive-produced by Shel Talmy.

On April 4, 2025, the DEKO label released the Fifth Estate's new 15-song album THEN and NOW on vinyl, CD, and online. The Grammy-winning guitarist Paul Nelson, formerly of Johnny Winter's band, played on many of the tracks but died before its completion.

== Members ==
- Rick Engler - guitar, fuzz bass, lead vocals, harmonica
- Ken 'Furvus' Evans - drums, vocals
- Doug 'Duke' Ferrara - bass, lead harmony vocals
- Wayne 'Wads' Wadhams (died 19 August 2008) - harpsichord, piano, organ, lead vocals
- Bill Shute - guitar, vocals
- Chuck LeGros - vocals, harmonica (1966)
- Bob 'Bobby Lee' Klein - lead vocals, keyboards, guitar (1969, 2006–present)

== Discography ==
=== Singles ===
as The D-Men

- "Don't You Know" b/w "No Hope For Me" (Veep/United Artists 1206 / July 1964)
- "I Just Don't Care" b/w "Messin Around" (Veep/United Artists 1209 / March 1965)
- "So Little Time" b/w "Every Minute of Every Day" (Kapp 691 / May 1965)

as The Fifth Estate

- "Love Is All a Game" b/w "Like I Love You" (Red Bird RB 10-064 / May 1966)
- "Ding Dong! The Witch Is Dead" b/w "Rub-a-Dub" (Jubilee 45-5573 / May 1967)
- "The Goofin Song" b/w "Lost Generation" (Jubilee 5588 / July 1967)
- "Heigh-Ho" b/w "It's Waiting There for You" (Jubilee 5595 / October 1967)
- "Morning, Morning" b/w "Tomorrow Is My Turn" (Jubilee 5607 / November 1967)
- "Do Drop Inn" b/w "That's Love" (Jubilee 5617 / February 1968)
- "Coney Island Sally" b/w "Tomorrow Is My Turn" (Jubilee 5627 / July 1968)
- "Night on Fire" b/w "I've Never Been So High" (three members as Medicine Mike) (Evolution 1011 / August 1969)

In 1969, two singles by studio musicians were released under the band's name without their permission or participation:

- "The Mickey Mouse Club March" b/w "I Knew You Before I Met You" (Jubilee 5655 / April 1969)
- "Parade of the Wooden Soldiers" b/w "I Knew You Before I Met You" (Jubilee 5683 / November 1969)

=== Albums ===
- Ding Dong! The Witch Is Dead (Jubilee Records JGS 8005 / 1967)
- Ding Dong! The Witch Is Back: 1964-1969 (Boston Skyline BSD 116/1992)
- Time Tunnel (Roxon Records LLC RR1001 / 2011)
- The Fifth Estate - Anthology 1 1964-1969 (Fuel 2000 / Universal Music Group, 2012)
- I Wanna Shout! (Break-A-Way Records 039 / 2014)
- Take The Fifth (Fuel 2000 Records 302 062 017 2 / 2014)
- Surf, Rocks & Fuzz (Roxon Records LLC RR1002 / 2016) - 1963 & 1964 recordings
- I Wanna Shout! (Roxon Records LLC RR1003 / 2016) - digital and vinyl, 1965 recordings
- On The Road (Roxon Records LLC RR1004 / 2016) - 1966 recordings
- The Best Of - The Fifth Estate (Roxon Records LLC RR1005 / 20016) - 1964 to 1970 recordings
- Higher Density (Roxon Records LLC RR1006 / 2016) - 1968 recordings
- Live, Loud & Lo-Fi (Roxon Records LLC RR1007 / 2016) - 1964 to 2012 live recordings
- Garunge Deluxe (Roxon Records LLC RR1008 / 2020) - garage and RnR material
- THEN and NOW (DEKO Entertainment LLC / 2025) - Classic rock and alternative material
- The Middle Years (DEKO Entertainment LLC / 2026) - Alternate and Unreleased from 1963 to 1971
