= Korg DDD-1 =

Drum machine

DDD-1
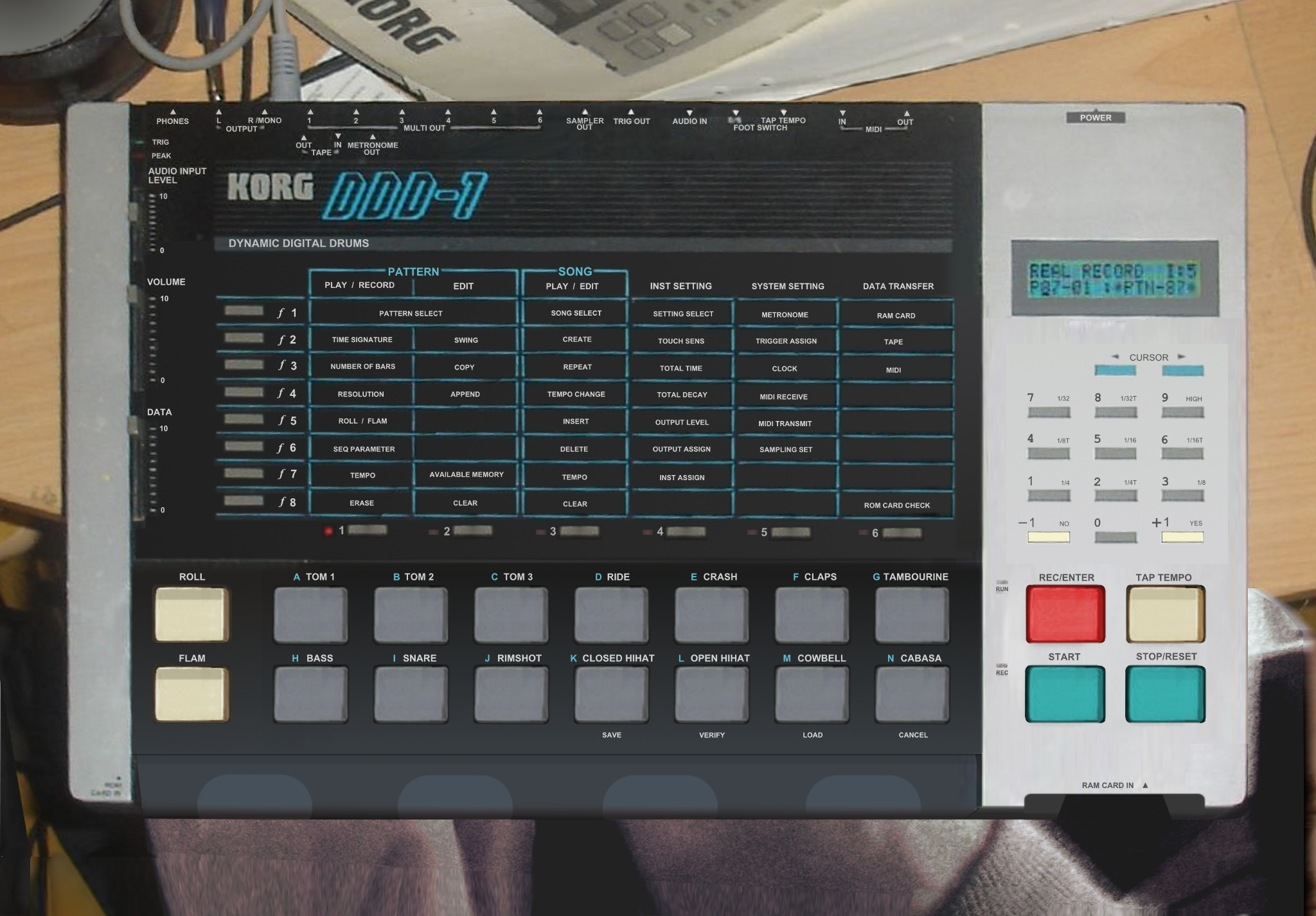
- Manufacturer: Korg
- Dates: 1986
- Price: £799 GBP

Technical specifications
- Polyphony: 18 voices
- Filter: None
- Velocity expression: Yes
- Storage memory: 100 patterns
- Effects: None
- Hardware: 78C10 Zilog

Input/output
- Keyboard: 14 assignable buttons
- External control: MIDI in, out

The DDD-1 (Dynamic Digital Drums) is a sampling drum machine released by Korg in 1986. It was Korg's first drum machine equipped with MIDI control and it features 14 velocity-sensitive pads, 12-bit samples, and limited user sampling that allows for the addition of new sounds. It also offers sound expansion through ROM cards, six assignable audio outputs, and a backlit LCD.

== Sounds and features ==
The DDD-1 includes 18 preset sounds, which can be triggered through 14 grey pads on the front panel, alongside additional pads for functions like roll and flam (white), start and stop/reset (blue), record/enter (red), and tap tempo (white). Below a 16-character LCD screen, there's a 10-key pad and cursor with +1/-1 buttons for menu navigation. Tempo adjustments can also be made with a data entry slider. The velocity-sensitive drum pads enable dynamic recording, simulating actual drum playing—hits with more force produce louder sounds in the pattern. Additionally, the DDD-1 offers five selectable dynamic envelopes, influencing volume changes based on the intensity of the pad strikes.

The drum machine features 18 sounds, including two types of kick drums and snares, three variations of toms, a rimshot, two sets of both closed and open hi-hats, crash and ride cymbals, claps, a cowbell, tambourine, and cabasa. Each sound's pitch can be adjusted within a 0-127 range. Sounds can be routed to any of six individual outputs for separate equalization. Voices routed through the left/right jacks can be placed in one of seven stereo field positions. The machine also includes a headphone output for monitoring.

The DDD-1 is capable of expanding its 18 built-in drum sounds by utilizing ROM cards, each of which contains up to eight additional sounds. The machine accommodates up to four ROM cards simultaneously, allowing their sounds to be used in conjunction with the internal ones. The optional DSB-1, a 12-bit sampling board, enables users to record samples with a maximum length of 3.2 seconds.

== Korg DDD-5 ==
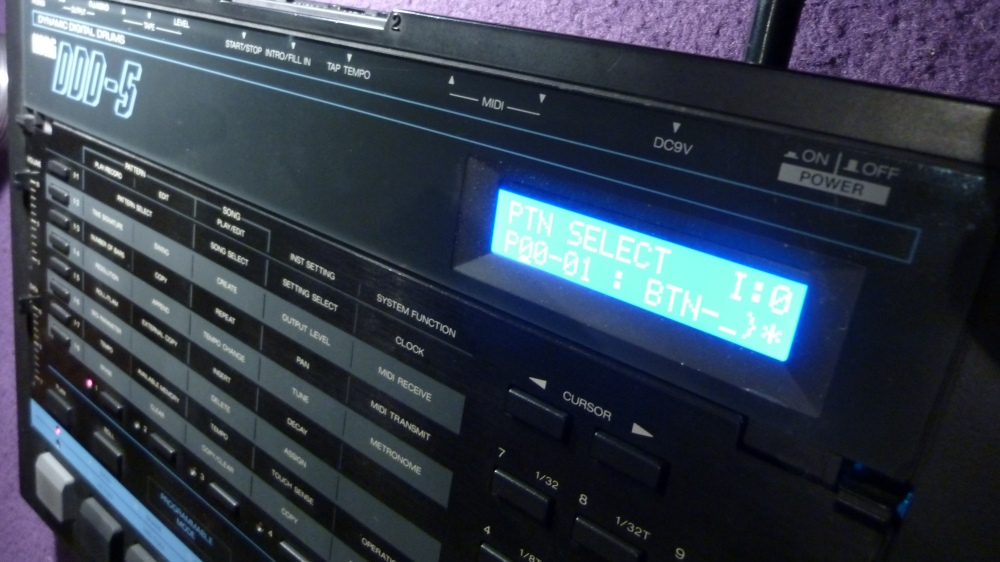
Korg DDD-5 with an LCD upgrade

In 1987 Korg introduced the DDD-5 as a more affordable version of the DDD-1, featuring just seven pads, lacking the sampling capability, and equipped with a reduced number of individual sound outputs on its rear panel. The Korg DDD-5 offers two distinct modes: preset and programmable, and comes with 29 built-in sounds, encompassing three bass drums, three snares, toms, Latin percussion, and a sampled bass guitar.
