= List of Oregon musicians =

The following is a partial list of notable musicians and musical groups, past and present, from the U.S. state of Oregon. The list is grouped by metropolitan area.

== Portland Metro Area ==
- 16volt
- 31Knots
- 36 Crazyfists
- Ævangelist
- Carrie B. Wilson Adams
- Derroll Adams
- Obo Addy
- Agalloch
- Ages and Ages
- Al-Andalus Ensemble
- Alan Singley and Pants Machine
- Edward Aldwell
- Art Alexakis
- Susan Alexjander
- Alialujah Choir
- All Girl Summer Fun Band
- Dave Allen
- American Me
- American Music Program
- Aminé
- Anatomy of a Ghost
- Signe Toly Anderson
- Kristin Andreassen
- Anne
- Geno Arce
- Archers Rise
- Alex Arrowsmith
- Ash Black Buffalo
- Gil Assayas
- Audio Learning Center
- Austere
- Jacob Avshalomov
- Tarik & Julia Banzi
- Bark Hide and Horn
- R. Barrows
- Battleme
- Emilie Frances Bauer
- Bill Beach
- Jim Beatty
- Beautiful Eulogy
- Becca
- Jona Bechtolt
- Billy D and the Hoodoos
- Diane Birch
- Kat Bjelland
- Black 'N Blue
- Black Prairie
- Blanket Music
- Blind Pilot
- Blitzen Trapper
- Weyes Blood
- Theodore Bloomfield
- Blouse
- Blue Giant
- Rachel Blumberg
- Henry Bogdan
- Braille
- Michael Braun
- Broadway Calls
- Isaac Brock
- Heather Woods Broderick
- Peter Broderick
- Jacinta Brondgeest
- Brothers of the Baladi
- Brooks Brown
- Mel Brown
- Tiffany Lee Brown
- Carrie Brownstein
- Corey Brunish
- George Bruns
- Bruxa
- Peter Buck
- Bugskull
- The Builders and the Butchers
- Kenji Bunch
- John Bunzow
- Kevin Burke
- Ken Butler
- Geoff Byrd
- Mike Byrne
- Cadallaca
- Calamity Jane
- John Callahan
- Ernie Carson
- Maria Catherine Callahan
- Cappella Romana
- Captain Bogg and Salty
- Barry Carl
- Cars & Trains
- James Cassidy
- Craig Carothers
- Cletis Carr
- Dave Carter and Tracy Grammer
- Case/lang/veirs
- Castle Jazz Band
- Caveman Shoestore
- Chervona
- Fred Child
- Mose Christensen
- Keith Christopher
- Chromatics
- Clamtones
- Jillian Clare
- Mike Clark
- Kneel Cohn
- Fred Cole
- Jenny Conlee
- Cool Nutz
- Sam Coomes
- Copy
- Mike Coykendall
- The Crabs
- Kyle Craft
- Larry Crane
- Crow and the Canyon
- Dan Cunneen
- Dan Reed Network
- Danava
- The Dandy Warhols
- Dat'r
- Valerie Day
- Dead Moon
- The Dead Stars on Hollywood
- Deen Castronovo
- Dear Nora
- Brent DeBoer
- The Decemberists
- Defiance
- The Delines
- Leon del Muerte
- Paul deLay
- Dharma Bums
- Alela Diane
- Jonny Diaz
- The Dimes
- Beth Ditto
- DJ Anjali and the Incredible Kid
- Dogheart
- Dolorean
- Don and the Goodtimes
- Lee Dorsey
- The Doubleclicks
- Sarah Dougher
- Dr. Theopolis
- Matt Drenik
- Drowse
- Dualesc
- Dweller at the Threshold
- East Forest
- Eastern Sunz
- Echo Helstrom
- Ecid
- Nicholas Edwards
- Eight Bells
- Jack Ely
- Emancipator
- Mark Englert
- Epoxies
- Donna Esposito
- Essiet Essiet
- Claire L. Evans
- Ever We Fall
- Everclear
- The Exploding Hearts
- Brendan Faegre
- Fallstar
- Amparito Farrar
- Lucia Fasano
- Fedayeen
- Federale
- Tom Filepp
- Filthy Friends
- Final Warning
- Shae Fiol
- Eddie Fisher
- Five Fingers of Funk
- Floater
- Mary Flower
- Foghorn Stringband
- Richmond Fontaine
- Fort Atlantic
- Kathy Foster
- Alma Francis
- Dave Frishberg
- Chris Funk
- Tony Furtado
- Tim Gaines
- Jon Garcia
- Josh Garrels
- Lenny Gault
- Lorraine Geller
- The Gentry
- Jacques Gershkovitch
- Laura Gibson
- Glass Candy
- Golden Delicious
- Golden Retriever
- Gossip
- John Gourley
- Grails
- Grand Duchy
- Tom Grant
- Jessie Coles Grayson
- Steve Green
- Grouper
- Janice Grube
- Gary Guthman
- Rich Halley
- Page Hamilton
- Olivebelle Hamon
- Kathleen Hanna
- Hutch Harris
- Lou Harrison
- Michael Allen Harrison
- John Haughm
- Adam Hawley
- Frank Hayes
- Phil Haynes
- Hazel
- Tommy Heath
- Heatmiser
- Collin Hegna
- Dana Heitman
- The Helio Sequence
- Kent Henry
- Sam Henry
- Haley Heynderickx
- The High Violets
- Hillsboro Symphony Orchestra
- Hillstomp
- Hockey
- Claire Hodgkins
- Peter Holmström
- The Holy Modal Rounders
- Holy Sons
- Honey Bucket
- Honkytonk Homeslice
- Patterson Hood
- Willem van Hoogstraten
- A Hope for Home
- Horse Feathers
- The Hudson Brothers
- Bill Hudson
- Brett Hudson
- Mark Hudson
- The Hugs
- The Hunches
- Hunger
- Ron Hurst
- I Can Lick Any Sonofabitch in the House
- Iame
- Icarus the Owl
- Illmaculate
- Inked in Blood
- Insomniac Folklore
- Issa
- It Prevails
- The Jackals
- Jackie-O Motherfucker
- Melynda Jackson
- Sara Jackson-Holman
- Gary Jarman
- Jen and Kat
- Jessy J
- The Joggers
- Johnny Jewel
- Jolly Mon
- Alan Jones
- Rena Jones
- Joseph
- Juke Joint Gamblers
- Kaddisfly
- Eric John Kaiser
- Carlos Kalmar
- Louis Kaufman
- Pat Kearns
- Key of Dreams
- Eddie Kilfeather
- Rebecca Kilgore
- Kind of Like Spitting
- King Bee
- King Black Acid
- Nancy King
- The Kingsmen
- Travis Knight
- Josef Komarek
- Pete Krebs
- Kutless
- L'Acéphale
- Patrick Lachman
- Lackthereof
- K.d. lang
- Storm Large
- The Last Artful, Dodgr
- Thomas Lauderdale
- Scott Law
- Laz-D
- Douglas Leedy
- Rod Levitt
- Norman Leyden
- Lifesavas
- Jon Lindsay
- Mark Lindsay
- Jon Lindstrom
- The Lives of Famous Men
- Loch Lomond
- Jeff Lorber
- Halie Loren
- Lost Lander
- Courtney Love
- Love on Ice
- Sergiu Luca
- Sara Lund
- Logan Lynn
- M. Ward
- Mackintosh Braun
- Stephen Malkmus
- Mandarin Dynasty
- Kate Mann
- Lisa Mann
- Robert Mann
- Leigh Marble
- MarchFourth Marching Band
- Tucker Martine
- Josh Martinez
- Ana Matronic
- Paul Mazzio
- Scott McCaughey
- John McEntire
- Bibi McGill
- Michael McQuilken
- MDC
- Mean Jeans
- Colin Meloy
- Tahirah Memory
- Thara Memory
- Daniel Menche
- Menomena
- James Mercer
- Metropolitan Youth Symphony
- Middian
- Mimicking Birds
- Mirah
- The Minders
- The Miracle Workers
- Grace Mitchell
- Pete Miser
- Glen Moore
- Phil Moore
- Modest Mouse
- Mordecai
- Neal Morgan
- Morning Teleportation
- Joan Morris
- Lee Morse
- Dent Mowrey
- Bua Xou Mua
- Musée Mécanique
- Naked Violence
- Napalm Beach
- Casey Neill
- Neo Boys
- The Neverclaim
- New Bad Things
- Chris Newman
- Kaitlyn ni Donovan
- Scout Niblett
- Ruban Nielson
- The No-No's
- No. 2
- Norfolk & Western
- Nu Shooz
- Nudge
- Nurses
- The Obituaries
- Oh Darling
- Patrick O'Hearn
- Ohmega Watts
- Old Time Relijun
- George Olsen
- William Olvis
- The Operacycle
- Oregon Chorale
- Oregon Mandolin Orchestra
- Oregon Repertory Singers
- Oregon Symphony
- Mark Orton
- Billy Oskay
- The Out Crowd
- Savannah Outen
- Tommy Overstreet
- Pagan Babies
- Parenthetical Girls
- Thomas H. Parrott
- Ralph Patt
- Moultrie Patten
- James Paul
- Katherine Paul
- Paul Revere & the Raiders
- Beverly Peck Johnson
- Pell Mell
- Jim Pepper
- Pete International Airport
- Pillorian
- Pink Martini
- Pleasure
- Joe Plummer
- Poison Idea
- Pond
- Portland Baroque Orchestra
- The Portland Cello Project
- Portland Chamber Orchestra
- Portland Choir & Orchestra
- Portland Columbia Symphony
- Portland Gay Men's Chorus
- Portland Lesbian Choir
- Portland Taiko
- Portland Youth Philharmonic
- Jane Powell
- Joe Powers
- The Prids
- Priory
- Providence
- Pulseprogramming
- The Punk Group
- Pure Bathing Culture
- Chris Pureka
- Quarterflash
- Quasi
- Harry Rabinowitz
- Alicia Jo Rabins
- RAC
- Ruth Radelet
- Radiation City
- Ramona Falls
- Billy Rancher
- The Range Rats
- The Rats
- Johnnie Ray
- Red Fang
- Michael Redman
- Kirk Reeves
- Andrea Reinkemeyer
- Corrina Repp
- Rescue
- Rhys
- Amanda Richards
- Fritz Richmond
- The Riffs
- Lolita Ritmanis
- Terry Robb
- Miles Benjamin Anthony Robinson
- Alyce Rogers
- Raina Rose
- Greg Sage
- Curtis Salgado
- Sallie Ford and the Sound Outside
- James Sample
- Jesse Sandoval
- Sassparilla
- Alexandra Savior
- Dan Schmid
- Isaac Scott
- Janice Scroggins
- Sexton Blake
- The Shaky Hands
- She & Him
- The Shins
- The Shivers
- Shook Twins
- Shy Girls
- Enric Sifa
- Jacques Singer
- Lori Singer
- Sixteen Cities
- The Slants
- Sleater-Kinney
- Sleep
- Langhorne Slim
- Smegma
- Elliott Smith
- Lawrence Leighton Smith
- Norm Smith
- Todd Snider
- Sophe Lux
- Beau Sorenson
- Ferdinand Sorenson
- Soriah
- Southerly
- Esperanza Spalding
- The Spinanes
- Spoon
- Jaime St. James
- The Standard
- Starover Blue
- Stars of Track and Field
- Tyler Stenson
- Stephen Malkmus and the Jicks
- James Stevens
- Still Pending
- The Stolen Sweets
- Stovokor
- John Stowell
- Strange Ranger
- Strength
- Strfkr
- Summer Cannibals
- Swan Island
- Swan Sovereign
- Sweaty Nipples
- Swords, also known as The Swords Project
- Taarka
- Talkdemonic
- David Tamkin
- Courtney Taylor-Taylor
- Hollis Taylor
- Tea for Julie
- Team Dresch
- Tears Run Rings
- Vernon Tejas
- Tender Forever
- Thanksgiving
- Tommy Thayer
- Theatre of Sheep
- The Thermals
- The Third Sex
- Ural Thomas
- Thundering Asteroids!
- Anna Tivel
- Toxic Holocaust
- Tracker
- Tragedy
- Trevino Brings Plenty
- John Trudeau
- Typhoon
- The U-Krew
- Unipiper
- The United Travel Service
- Unknown Mortal Orchestra
- The Upsidedown
- Veio
- Laura Veirs
- Vektroid
- Velvet Cacoon
- Verah Falls
- Liz Vice
- The Village Green
- Leroy Vinnegar
- Visible Cloaks
- Viva Voce
- Wake Owl
- Christopher Walla
- Holcombe Waller
- Wampire
- Liv Warfield
- Warlord
- Johanna Warren
- The Water Tower Bucket Boys
- A Weather
- Weinland
- Janet Weiss
- Western Front
- Wet Confetti
- Nancy Whang
- Whip
- Josh White
- Evan Wickham
- Wild Dogs
- Wild Flag
- Wild Ones
- Brad Wilk
- Gabriel Wilson
- Kaia Wilson
- Sandin Wilson
- Winter of Apokalypse
- Wipers
- Witch Mountain
- Ben Wolfe
- Renn Woods
- Wow & Flutter
- Rob Wrong
- Juliet Wyers
- Maiah Wynne
- Y La Bamba
- Yacht
- Yeat
- Yellow Swans
- Yum Yum Children
- Yume Bitsu
- Yung Bae
- Quiz Zilla

== Eugene Metro Area ==
- Adickdid
- Aerodrone
- Akem Manah
- Alive Like Me
- Black Francis
- Tracy Bonham
- Brooks Brown
- Tiffany Lee Brown
- Cadet
- Andie Case
- Nalini Cheriel
- Cherry Poppin' Daddies
- Cigar
- Cletis Carr
- Ian Crawford
- Robert Cray
- Debaser
- Sarah Dougher
- Peter Epstein
- Eugene Concert Choir
- Eugene Symphony
- Eugene-Springfield Youth Orchestras
- Floater, moved to Portland in 1997
- Anna Gilbert
- Green Garter Band
- Tony Glausi
- Tim Hardin
- Bill Harkleroad
- Megan Marie Hart
- Evynne Hollens
- Peter Hollens
- Tom Intondi
- Japanese Breakfast
- Andrew Katz, of Car Seat Headrest
- Kelly Keagy
- Mat Kearney
- Justin King
- Emily Kokal
- Mark Lindsay
- Halie Loren
- Thomas Mapfumo
- Susan Marshall
- Shawn McDonald
- Rose McGowan
- Justin Meldal-Johnsen
- Oregon
- Oregon Mozart Players
- Steve Perry
- Susan Raye
- Helmuth Rilling
- RJD2
- Miles Benjamin Anthony Robinson
- Rock 'n' Roll Soldiers
- Rootdown
- Marty Ross
- Elizabeth Rowe
- Dan Schmid
- Dan Siegel
- Some Velvet Sidewalk
- Christopher Stevens
- Stick Against Stone
- Surf Trio
- This Patch of Sky
- Matt Treder
- Corin Tucker
- Milagro Vargas
- Charlie Vázquez
- Henry Vestine
- The Visible Men
- Aja Volkman
- Von Pimpenstein
- Theresa Wayman
- Ben Weaver
- White Hot Odyssey
- Mason Williams
- Taylor John Williams
- Carsten Woll
- Paul Wright
- Yob
- Michelle Zauner
- Sneakers

== Salem Metro Area ==
- Kat Bjelland
- Winifred Byrd
- John Doan
- John Fahey
- Hell
- Hallie Parrish Hinges
- Kelly LeMieux
- Cory Kendrix
- Audrey Luna
- John Moen
- Kate Nauta
- Kathy Boyd and Phoenix Rising
- Ryan Neighbors, of Portugal. The Man
- Larry Norman
- Jim Pepper
- Joe Preston, of The Melvins, High on Fire, and Thrones
- Saint
- The Severin Sisters
- Typhoon
- Dolora Zajick

== Corvallis Metro Area ==
- Archers Rise
- Debra Arlyn
- Bill Beach
- Chris Botti
- Meredith Brooks
- Collin Raye
- Crazy 8s
- Eyvind Kang
- Wayne Krantz
- David Metzger
- Stephen Scott
- Brian Smith
- Mandana Coleman Thorp
- The W's
- The Wrays

== Medford Metro Area ==
- Alice DiMicele
- Johnny Gruelle
- Gary "Chicken" Hirsh
- Peter Hollens
- Scott Kelly
- Forrest Kline
- Rose Maddox
- Neighb'rhood Childr'n
- Michael Ruppert
- Jon Micah Sumrall
- Larry Wagner
- Virus Nine

== Other ==
- Hoyt Axton, from Glide
- Shannon Bex, from Bend
- Ernest Bloch, from Newport
- Broadway Calls, from Rainier
- Hanneke Cassel, from Oregon
- Cindertalk, from Oregon
- Columbia Gorge Orchestra Association, from Hood River
- The Dirtball, from Prineville
- A Dream Too Late, from Albany
- Falling Up, from Albany
- Flor, from Hood River
- Rick Foster, Days Creek
- Michael Garrison, from Roseburg
- Joseph Gramley, from Oregon
- David Haney, from McMinnville
- Tyler Hentschel, from Roseburg
- Tim Johnson, from Noti
- Jerry Kilgore, from Tillamook
- Larry and His Flask, from Bend
- Charles Littleleaf, from Warm Springs Indian Reservation
- Matt the Electrician, from southern Oregon
- Victor Aloysius Meyers, from Seaside
- Harold Vincent Milligan, from Astoria
- Mr. Lucky and the Gamblers, from Newport
- David Nevue, from North Bend
- Mickey Newbury, from Vida
- Vincent C. Plunkett, from Oregon
- Oregon Jazz Band, from Coos Bay
- Oregon East Symphony, from Pendelton
- Johnnie Ray, from Hopewell
- The Send, from Albany
- Doc Severinsen, from Arlington
- Jamie Slocum, from Grants Pass
- Lewis Southworth, from Waldport
- Ryan Steveneson, from Bonanza
- The Toyes, from Grants Pass
- Marcia Van Dyke, from Grants Pass
- Doc Watkins, from Oregon
- Griff Williams, from La Grande
- Bridgette Wilson, from Gold Beach
- Johnny Zell, from Oregon
