= Music of Oregon =

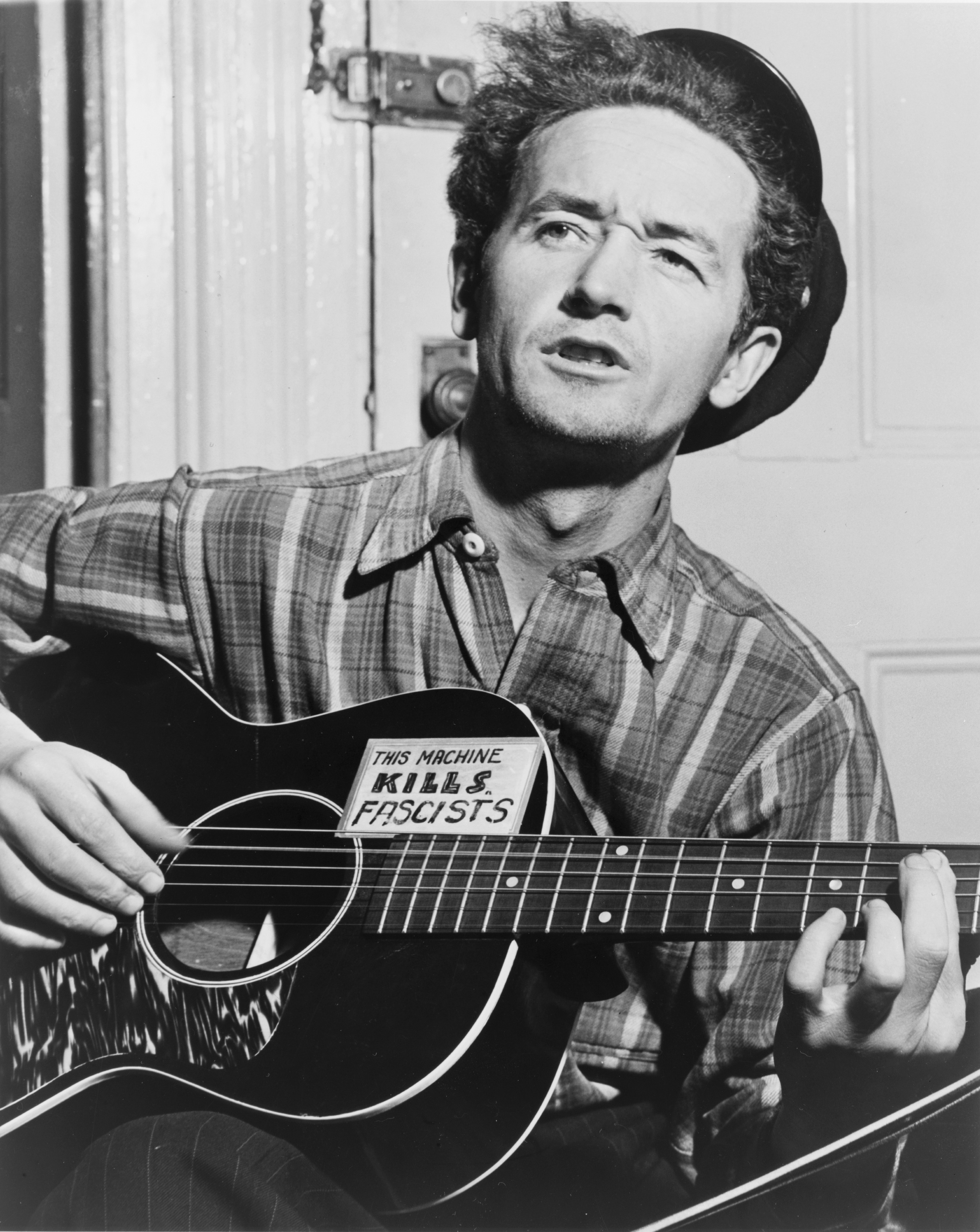
Woody Guthrie wrote several songs about the Northwest under the commission of the Bonneville Power Administration.

The music of Oregon reflects the diverse array of styles present in the music of the United States, from Native American music to the contemporary genres of rock and roll, country, rhythm and blues, jazz, pop, electronic music, and hip hop. However, throughout most of its history, the state has been relatively isolated from the cultural forces shaping American music. Much of modern popular music traces its roots to the emergence in the late 19th century of African American blues and the growth of gospel music in the 1920s. African American musicians borrowed elements of European and Indigenous musics to create new American forms. As Oregon's population was more homogeneous and more white than the United States as a whole, the state did not play a significant role in this history.

== History ==
The state's main contributions to American popular music began in the 1960s, when The Kingsmen and Paul Revere & the Raiders established Oregon as a minor center of frat rock and garage rock. This led in one direction to the blues rock tradition of the Robert Cray Band and Curtis Salgado, and in another direction to the hardcore punk scene of the early 1980s Pacific Northwest, led by the Wipers in Portland and like-minded bands in Seattle and Vancouver, BC. Over the next twenty years, punk rock evolved into grunge, riot grrrl, alternative rock, and, eventually, indie rock. In the last decade, Oregon has made a unique contribution to American independent music, with a strong indie music scene developing in Portland. The city's reputation as a hipster mecca has paralleled the rise of local indie musicians such as The Decemberists (singer Colin Meloy attended the University of Oregon), Gossip, The Dandy Warhols, M. Ward, Logan Lynn, Storm Large, Pink Martini and the late Elliott Smith. Floater is Portland's leading example of an indie band. They have remained unsigned to a major label for over 20 years and have managed to be voted the best band of Portland for 2009 in addition to frequently selling out major venues like the Crystal Ballroom and the Aladdin Theater. Other prominent musicians have relocated to Portland, including Modest Mouse (of Seattle), Sleater-Kinney (of Olympia, Washington), The Shins (of Albuquerque, New Mexico), Spoon (of Austin, Texas), former Pavement leader Stephen Malkmus (of Stockton, California), singer songwriter Patterson Hood (of Muscle Shoals, Alabama, and Athens, Georgia), and former R.E.M. guitarist Peter Buck (of Berkeley, California and Athens, Georgia).

== Portland ==
=== Pop music ===
From the 1960s to the 1980s, some musical groups from Portland had occasional success on the pop charts. The Kingsmen (singer Jack Ely died in Oregon) were the first to hit the top 10 with their 1960s garage rock classic "Louie Louie" peaking at #2, and Paul Revere & the Raiders gained popularity in Portland after relocating there from Idaho. The Hudson Brothers had several hits, such as "Mr. Kirby" (though originally this came when the group was named 'The New Yorkers'), "So You Are a Star" and even had their own eponymous TV show during the 1970s. Quarterflash (which started out in the 1970s as a jazz band called 'Seafood Mama'), were led by the husband/wife duo Marv & Rindy Ross. The band had several hits, including a platinum-selling #3 song "Harden My Heart" in 1981. Nu Shooz, also led by a husband/wife duo (John Smith & Valerie Day), also had several hits, their biggest also going to #3 "I Can't Wait" in 1986.

=== Punk rock ===
Portland had one of the most vibrant hardcore punk scenes in the early 1980s Pacific Northwest, rivaled only by Seattle and Vancouver. The Wipers and Poison Idea are the best known representatives of the scene, especially The Wipers, a major grunge influence. These bands played at The Met and the Satyricon. Other hardcore bands in the 1980s included Lockjaw, Final Warning, and The Rats. Hole frontwoman Courtney Love spent time in Portland, and was active in the city's punk scene at the time.

=== Indie music ===
In recent years, a number of indie music bands from Portland which have played local venues have won recording contracts with promoters such as Partisan Records and Knitting Factory Records and have been touring nationally. These include Emil Amos of Holy Sons, Sallie Ford and the Sound Outside, Ages and Ages, Dolorean, and others.

Blues

=== Dance music ===
Portland is also home of the world's first and only all-Asian American dance rock band, The Slants, another independent act who has been made international headlines, both for their public battle with the United States Patent and Trademark Office, as well as their active involvement in the anime industry.

== Eugene ==
Formed in 1984, the Surf Trio was a punk/surf band based in Eugene.

Floater was formed in 1993 and made their start playing garage parties and at the University of Oregon. Now residing in Portland, Floater has released eight studio albums, plus three live albums on indie label Elemental Records. They have also received nominations to the preliminary level of the Grammys from NARAS in 1995 under Best Rock Performance for their first album Sink and in 1996 under Best Alternative Performance for their second album Glyph.

As for songs about Eugene, two country stars have weighed in. Dolly Parton wrote a song about Eugene in 1972, which was released in the 4-CD box set Dolly in 2009, with the refrain, "Eugene, Oregon I'll remember you for the rest of my life, I won't forget how good you were to me, No and I won't be forgettin' all the kindness that you show To a homesick country girl a long, long way from Tennessee." In addition, Johnny Cash recorded the song "Lumberjack," written by Leon Payne, referring to Eugene Saturday nights: "Well you work in the woods from morning to night, You laugh and sing and you cuss and fight, On Saturday night you go to Eugene, And on a Sunday morning your pockets are clean."

In 2015 Sufjan Stevens released Carrie & Lowell, which includes a song entitled "Eugene", as well as "All Of Me Wants All of You", with references to Spencer Butte, a landmark at Eugene's southern edge.

== List of Oregon musicians ==
See List of Oregon musicians for a full list of notable musicians from Oregon.

== Musical events in Oregon ==
- Oregon Bach Festival
- Oregon Festival of American Music
- Waterfront Blues Festival, yearly four-day Portland blues festival in July showcasing top artists from around the world
- Britt Festival, outdoor summer music performances in Jacksonville
- Shanghaied in Astoria is a musical melodrama performed from July–August since 1984 written and performed by local talent
- The Oregon Jamboree was a country music festival held from 1992 to 2025 in Sweet Home.
- The Eugene Celebration
- The Oregon Country Fair, although not primarily billed as a music festival, has several stages where musicians perform regularly during the three-day event.
- The Ernest Bloch Music Festival, an annual composers' symposium and showcase for progressive and contemporary music, is held in Newport. Ernest Bloch was a composer who lived in Agate Beach, and has a memorial located in Newport. The festival is regarded country-wide and is a cultural high-point every year for musicians classically or otherwise trained. Traditionally, performers from the Oregon Symphony and other local performance groups attend specifically to play pieces written by the guest composers.
- Vortex I, a 1970 music festival near Estacada
- Boombox In Da Boondocks, an EDM festival near Salem, OR that has been running for almost a decade
- Fire, a long-running electronic dance music festival near Mount Hood
- Paradiso, a large, high-attendance EDM festival in the Columbia River Gorge featuring many national and international headliners
- MusicfestNW, a two-day festival on the waterfront in downtown Portland
- Pickathon is a three-day music festival taking place every August at Pendarvis Farm in Happy Valley

== See also ==
- Indigenous music of North America § Northwest Coast
- Northwest hip hop
- Oregon Music Hall of Fame
- X-Ray Cafe

== Bibliography ==
- Blush, Steven (2001). American Hardcore: A Tribal History. Los Angeles, CA: Feral House. ISBN 0-922915-71-7.
