= Just a Moment =

Just a Moment may refer to:

- Just a Moment (Ling Tosite Sigure album), 2009
- Just a Moment, an album by Enric Sifa, 2007
- "Just a Moment" (song), a song by Nas
- "Just a Moment", a song by Tokio Hotel from 2001, 2022
