= Griff Williams =

Griff Williams may refer to:

- Griff Williams (painter)
- Griff Williams (musician)
- Griff Williams (rugby union)
