= Billy D and the Hoodoos =

US musical group

Billy D and the Hoodoos are an American musical group from Portland, Oregon, United States.

Born on the south side of Chicago, Billy Desmond grew up influenced by early rock music and blues. Billy began his career playing professionally at teen dances and parties at the age of fourteen, and by eighteen he was sneaking in Chicago blues clubs to hear Muddy Waters, Junior Wells, Buddy Guy and James Cotton. Eventually, Billy would work with Wells and other blues musicians such as Big Time Sarah, Robert Cray and Detroit Junior.

Billy led his first band, Skid City Blues, as lead guitarist, singer and songwriter touring the Midwest during the 1970s. By 1984, Billy moved to Los Angeles, California, and studied with established artist Tony Matthews, and played for Little Richard and Ray Charles. Billy spent half a year playing guitar for Don "Sugarcane" Harris.

The mid-1990s found Billy in Santa Fe, New Mexico, focusing on developing his original music. About this time, Billy D and the HooDoos materialized. They were the opening act for Los Lonely Boys and Robert Cray at the KTAO 2003 Annual Solar Fest in New Mexico, and his original song, "She's The One", was then voted the number one song by a local area artist.

Billy relocated to Portland, Oregon, in 2010. His CD, Somethin's Wrong, has been well received and Billy regularly promotes his music through his website and by performing in local Pacific Northwest venues as well as festivals and venues across the US. He is known for his unique stage presence and big, effortless sound.

Billy's unique style transcends traditional blues music:

My main Electric Axe is a Suhr—custom made by a guy named John Suhr who was out of California when I got the guitar about 8 years ago. It's a Telecaster style body—both body and neck are made of mahogany—with a rosewood fingerboard with simple dot inlay. I love Humbuckers—the neck pickup is a Rio Grande "Texas Humbucker" and the bridge pickup is a Seymour Duncan "Hotrail", which is a squished double-coil that fits perfectly into a cutout originally designed for a single-coil. I use the Rio Grande most of the time 'cuz I love that fat mellow singing tone.

Videos of Billy D and The Hoodoos performing original compositions from the CD have been uploaded to YouTube have brought high visibility and increased his fan base in the United States, Canada and Europe.

In 2013, the title track of Billy's album Somethin's Wrong won the UK Songwriting competition Jazz/Blues category. In August of that same year, Billy D and the HooDoos won the Sin City Soul and Blues Revival video contest landing them a slot in that Las Vegas festival.

== Discography ==
Year	Title	Record label	Ref.
2009	Somethin's Wrong	Billy D & the Hoodoos	
2017	Overnight Success	Rokdablu Records	
