= X-Ray Cafe =

Music venue in Portland, Oregon, United States

- Interactive map of X-Ray Cafe
- Address: Portland, Oregon; United States

Construction
- Opened: 1990
- Closed: 1994

The X-Ray Cafe was a small music venue in Portland, Oregon, United States from 1990 to 1994. An all-ages and community-oriented club, the X-Ray played a "heavyweight role in shaping Portland's underground culture", fostering such musical acts as The Dandy Warhols, Dead Moon, Elliott Smith, Team Dresch, and Quasi, and hosted national acts like Bikini Kill and Green Day and was described by Details as one of the best rock and roll clubs in the country. Located at 214 W. Burnside St., it was characterized by a surreal environment and performers; owners Tres Shannon and Benjamin Arthur Ellis, who took over the U.F.O Cafe to establish the X-Ray and were in the band The Kurtz Project, encouraged acts that featured instruments that aren't typically associated with rock music, like Big Daddy Meatstraw, who performed on stage in clown costumes. As grunge and alternative music were emerging in Portland and Seattle under a national spotlight, the X-Ray served as an important stage for smaller acts in the genre, and along with nearby Satyricon nightclub, established Portland as an important regional performing destination for touring bands.

The X-Ray was in operation from 1990 to 1994.

An archival recording of the Dead Moon concert on X-Ray's closing night, August 16, 1994, was released by Voodoo Doughnut Recordings. A few songs into an already cathartic set, marked by the themes of an ending epoch and an inevitable changing-of-the-guards, singer and bassist Toody Cole remarks to the crowd, "What a way to see the old girl go!" The old girl is both the venue–the widely venerated, black velvet painting-decorated X-Ray Cafe and the community it created.

The club is the subject of a 2000 documentary, "X-Ray Visions," directed by former owner Ellis.

Owner Richard "Tres" Shannon III has remained a prominent figure in Portland. He booked music for neighboring club Berbati's Pan, and later opened Voodoo Doughnut. He has also run for Mayor of Portland and City Council, and founded the innovative karaoke band Karaoke from Hell.

The X-Ray Cafe was the site of a small but controversial riot in 1993.

== See also ==
- Culture of Portland, Oregon
- Music of Oregon
