= Chervona =

American band

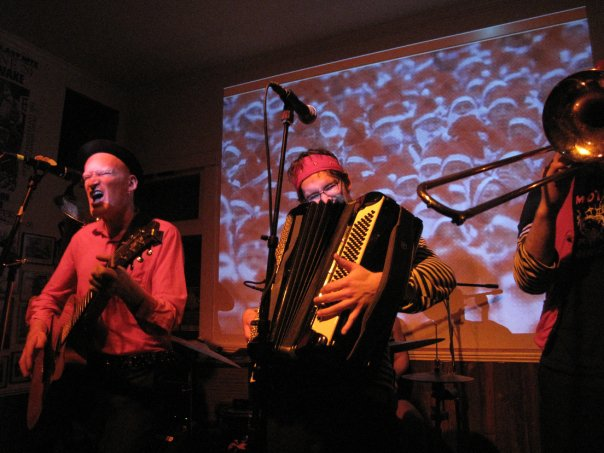
- Andre Temkin and Anton Van Oosbree performing as members of Chervona at the Alberta St. Public House, 31 December 2009.

Background information
- Origin: Portland, OR, United States
- Genres: Folk punk Klezmer
- Years active: 2006–present
- Members: Andre Temkin; Roman Tchamsky; Andrew Alikhanov; Thomas de Almeida; Anton Van Oosbree; Adam Schneider; Olimpia Trusty
- Past members: Dan Marquis; Vince Schmidt; Ted Ochoa
- Website: www.chervona.com

Chervona is a multi-ethnic, Russian and Eastern European-inspired band from Portland, Oregon, that formed in 2006. They have become known for their Old World-inspired music and their highly energetic live shows.

Much of the band's repertoire consists of revamped classics of Russian folk songs as well as klezmer songs from the Black Sea region of Odessa. The band also incorporates many original compositions into its live performances.

== History and influences ==
Chervona started as a side project of Miru Mir!, a multi-cultural rock/punk band known for its raucous energy and its "high-energy blend of bohemian bombast and international intrigue." After a number of initial appearances alongside well-established acts in the genre, such as Manu Chao, Chervona quickly gained the attention of the Portland music scene and has since surpassed Miru Mir! in popularity and commercial success.

Miru Mir!, itself a side project of a now-defunct band, Starbugs, was founded by Andre Temkin, who came to Portland, OR in 1995 after reading an article that voted Portland Best American City. Among his major influences he lists Lou Reed and The Beatles, of which only bootleg recordings were available in his native St. Petersburg, Russia.

Temkin met Roman Tchamsky and Andrew Alikhanov, both also Russian immigrants, in Portland and established various musical connections with the two. Tchamsky first played bass guitar for Miru Mir! and, after Chervona was founded, played tuba, which he learned during his time in the Russian army. Alikhanov, a former roommate of Temkin's, lent his clarinet to the group while maintaining a roster of other local projects, many of which he still plays with today. In 2007 Anton Van Oosbree substituted for the group's original accordion player, Vince Schmidt, on a number of gigs, but later became a full-time member after Schmidt moved to New Orleans, LA to pursue other musical endeavors. Around the same time as Van Oosbree's inception, Dan Marquis started to play drums alongside Thomas de Almeida, giving the band greater scheduling flexibility and allowing the group to perform as a marching ensemble, albeit one with a vastly minimized drumline. Marquis has since left the group for his native Indianapolis, IN. In an effort to round out the band's sound Adam Schneider also joined the group in 2007 and remains at the center of the group's horn section on trombone. In 2009 Olimpia Trusty joined the band to further supplement the band's sound with violin.

The band remains self-managed and has yet to sign to a label.

== Line-up ==
=== Current members ===
- Andre Temkin (vocals, steel-string guitar, acoustic guitar) - Russia
- Roman Tchamsky (bass, tuba, backing vocalist) - Russia
- Andrew Alikhanov (clarinet, backing vocalist) - Russia
- Anton Van Oosbree (accordion, trumpet, backing vocalist) - United States
- Adam Schneider (trombone, backing vocalist) - US Virgin Islands
- Cheo Larcombe (drums, backing vocalist)
- Thomas de Almeida (drums, backing vocalist) - Brazil
- Kyle Butz (bass trombone, backing vocalist) - United States
- Jeff Holt (accordion, (saxophone, backing vocalist)
- Michael Pen (trombone, backing vocalist) - US Virgin Islands

=== The Team ===
- Alma Laskoniene (muse, creative juice generator, song writing, graphic design, Promotions)
- Aleksey Ryskin (songwriting)
- Evan Phillip Zinner (Live Sound Production)

=== Former members ===
- Dan Marquis (drums)
- Vince Schmidt (Accordion)
- Ted Ochoa (Trumpet)
- Olimpia Trusty (Violin)

== Festival appearances ==
- Bite of Oregon (Portland, OR)
- Slavic Festival (Eugene, OR)
- Burning Man's Burnal Equinox (San Francisco, CA)
- Red Marines (Palo Alto, CA)
- NW Folklife (Seattle, WA)
- PDX Pop Now! (Portland, OR)
- Victoria Ska Fest (Victoria, BC)
- Under the Volcano (North Vancouver, BC)
- Arts Festival in the Forest (West Linn, OR)
- Polish Festival (Portland, OR)
- Portland Pirate Festival

== Chervona in the press ==
- PDXposed TV segment Chervona on PDXposed
- Immigrant Revolution Party 2009 The Oregonian: Entertainment
- Chervona: New Video vs. Old Russian New Year Oregon Music News

== Awards and recognitions ==
- Band of the Month, The Deli: Portland
- Best New Band 2009, nomination
- Best of 2010 Fans' Poll, The Deli: Portland

== Charity and community appearances ==
In response to the devastating earthquake Haiti suffered in January 2010, Chervona participated in the Portland-based charity event to help raise over $4,000 in relief funds. The group has also donated its time by performing at bicycle events including the Multnomah County Bike Fair and Zoobomb's Mini Bike Winter.

In April 2011 they headlined a "Help Japan!" benefit event, which money Red Crossto help victims of the 2011 Tōhoku earthquake and tsunami.

== Trivia ==
Chervona has performed at a number of beer-related events, including Rogue Ales' Bones and Brew Festival, Walking Man Brewery's Hoptoberfest and BridgePort Brewing Company's Hop Czar release party.
