= Sassparilla (band) =

US musical group

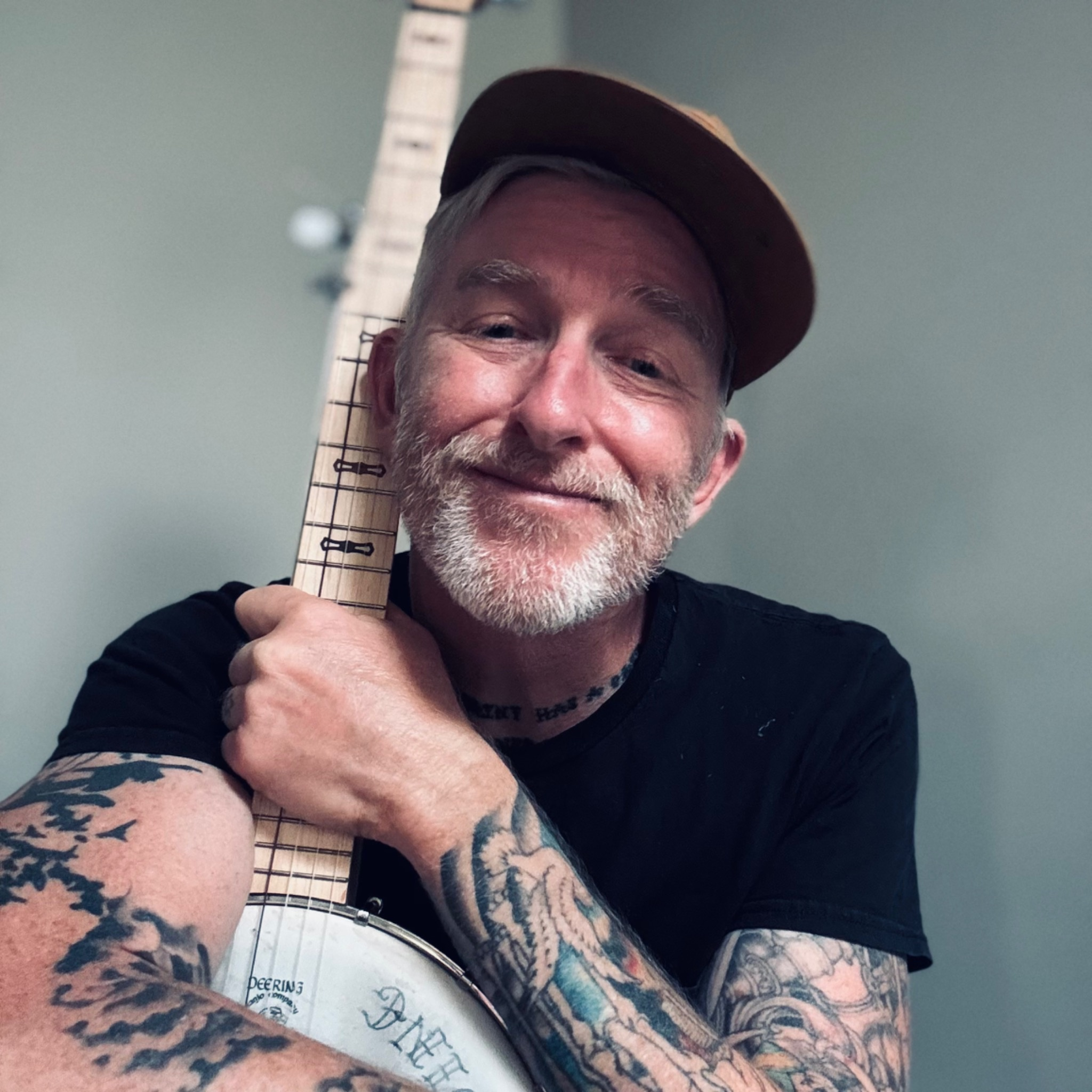
- Kevin Blackwell, lead singer and songwriter of Sassparilla

Background information
- Origin: Portland, Oregon
- Genres: roots-rock
- Labels: Fluff and Gravy; In Music We Trust
- Members: Kevin "Gus" Blackwell; Ross "Dagger" Macdonald; Colin "Sweet Pea" Macdonald; Naima; Doug Ebert; Dan Power
- Past members: Ben Stewart; Justin Burkhardt; Dan Frantz; Emily Frantz; Dan "Tater" Moeller
- Website: www.sassparilla.info

Sassparilla is an American indie-roots and punk-Americana band originally formed in Portland, Oregon, and now based in Portland, Oregon and Golden, Colorado. Known for blending old-time string-band traditions, hill country blues, and punk ethos, the group has developed a reputation for high-energy live performances and a genre-crossing recorded output. Over the course of nine studio albums, Sassparilla has evolved from a raw, roots-punk outfit into a more introspective and sonically varied project centered on the songwriting of frontman Kevin “Gus” Blackwell.

History:

Formation and Early Years (2007–2010):
Sassparilla emerged from Portland’s independent music scene in the mid-2000s. Their debut album, Debilitated Constitution (2007), introduced a stripped-down sound rooted in country-blues and ragtime traditions, delivered with a punk sensibility. Follow-up releases Rumpus (2008) and Ramshackle (2010) expanded the band’s audience in the Pacific Northwest, where they became known for lively, participatory performances featuring dancing, sing-alongs, and an unpolished, electrified energy.

During this period, the band’s lineup included Blackwell on vocals and cigar box guitar, Ross “Dagger” Macdonald on harmonica, Colin “Sweet Pea” Macdonald on washtub bass, Naima on accordion and washboard, and drummer Justin Burkhardt. The father-son pairing of Ross and Colin Macdonald became a distinctive element of the band’s early identity.

The Darndest Thing and Artistic Growth (2011–2014):
In 2011, Sassparilla released The Darndest Thing on In Music We Trust. Produced by Chet Lyster of The Eels, the album marked a stylistic shift toward more structured songwriting and cohesive album craft. While earlier releases emphasized performance energy and genre-hopping experimentation, The Darndest Thing focused more closely on lyrical depth and thematic unity. Blackwell described the album as reflecting personal transitions into adulthood, including experiences of loss and maturation.

The band continued its collaboration with Lyster on Magpie (2013), released on Fluff and Gravy Records. Subsequent releases Pasajero/Hullabaloo (2014, Fluff and Gravy) further solidified Sassparilla’s reputation as a prolific and evolving roots-rock act.

Later Releases and Relocation (2019–2020):
After a brief recording hiatus, Sassparilla returned with No Country, No Flag (2019) and Good For What Ails Ya (2020). These albums continued to explore Americana and roots influences while incorporating broader lyrical themes and more expansive arrangements. During this period, Blackwell increasingly took on production responsibilities, building on knowledge gained during earlier collaborations with Lyster.

Honey, I’m Using Again (2026):
By the mid-2020s, Blackwell had relocated to Golden, Colorado, while maintaining ties to Portland. In 2026, Sassparilla released their ninth studio album, Honey, I’m Using Again (In Music We Trust). Recorded and produced in Blackwell’s basement studio in Colorado, the fifteen-song collection marked one of the band’s most personal and stripped-down efforts.

Driven primarily by banjo and sparse percussion, the album explores themes of addiction, aging, homelessness, suicide, and love lost. The title track uses addiction as a metaphor for self-destructive behaviors and recurring personal struggles. Blackwell cited the influence of longtime peers such as Hillstomp, The Devil Makes Three, and Agnostic Mountain Gospel Choir, while emphasizing a deliberate simplicity in chord structure and arrangement.

The album also marked a collaborative chapter with musicians Doug Ebert and Dan Power, both former associates of Blackwell from earlier musical projects. Blackwell’s teenage son Emmett contributed drums to the recording, adding a multigenerational element to the band’s evolving lineup. Blackwell has described the album as rekindling his creative momentum and inspiring additional material for future releases.

Musical Style:

Sassparilla has been described as indie-roots, punk-Americana, and punk-roots. Their sound blends Americana traditions—such as old-time string-band music and hill country blues—with the urgency and ethos of punk rock. Instrumentation across various eras has included cigar box guitar, National resonator guitar, banjo, harmonica, accordion, washboard, washtub bass, and traditional drum kit.

While early releases emphasized raw performance energy and genre-hopping eclecticism, later albums have shown increased focus on cohesive songwriting, thematic depth, and restrained arrangements. Live performances remain central to the band’s identity, often featuring audience interaction and dance-driven sets.

Sassparilla continues to perform and record, maintaining a presence in both the Pacific Northwest and Colorado music communities.

== Discography ==
- Debilitated Constitution (2007)
- Rumpus (2008)
- Ramshackle (2010)
- The Darndest Thing (2011, In Music We Trust)
- Magpie (2013, Fluff and Gravy)
- Pasajero/Hullabaloo (2014, Fluff and Gravy)
- No Country, No Flag (2019)
- Good For What Ails Ya (2020)
- Honey I'm Using Again (2026, In Music We Trust)
