= Eric John Kaiser =

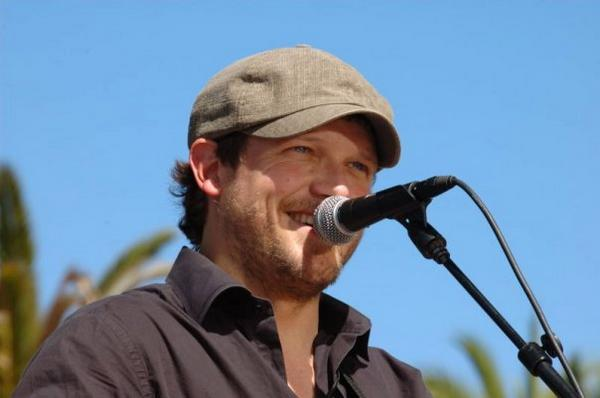
- Eric John Kaiser performing in San Francisco

Background information
- Origin: Boulogne Billancourt, France
- Genres: French Rock, French Pop Rock
- Years active: 2005 to present
- Website: http://www.ericjohnkaiser.com/

Eric John Kaiser (born November 8, 1973, in Boulogne Billancourt, France) is a French Singer Songwriter based in Portland, Oregon. He began recording music professionally in 2005 with his first EP, Paris Acte I, Scène 1. He plays a style of music that has been described as a Parisian Americana with influences from Blues, rock and Folk all wrapped in both English and French lyrics.

== History ==
Eric John Kaiser grew up in Verrières-le-Buisson in the suburbs of Paris. After studying in Tours he moved to Paris to live as a young adult. He started by performing as a musician in cafes and pubs. He recorded several five-song CDs (with his band Melt or as a solo artist) and played over 350 concerts in France. In 2006 he decided to move to Portland, Oregon, and since then has been featured on the 2007 PDX Pop Now! compilation, has gotten airplay on Seattle-based public radio station KEXP, and has released two full-length albums – the first in 2006, L'ODyssée, was recorded at the Paris studio of Philippe Baïa (studio for Sony Music/V2 records), and the second in 2009, French Troubadour, was recorded in Portland at Type Foundry Studio (known for working with The Decemberists, Spoon, M. Ward, Jolie Holland and Alela Diane) which was critically praised by media outlets such as OPB Music, The Oregonian, Willamette Week, and The Portland Mercury. Zach Mann of OPB Music had this to say about his second album, "Eric John Kaiser's 2009 CD release French Troubadour contains a full spectrum of great old style pop/rock songs, expertly written and delivered with engaging storytelling." In 2009 he opened for multi-platinum selling UK super-group Stereophonics at Portland's Wonder Ballroom. In 2010 he recorded his third EP at 8 Ball Studio in Portland called Portland Rendez-Vous and released it later that year. Most recently, he opened for compatriots Revolver at Portland's Mississippi Studios where he played a number of new songs from his upcoming third album which is expected to be released in the spring of next year.

Eric John Kaiser tours frequently including a yearly trip back to his native France for shows. In Paris he has played at the Solidays Festival, La Scène Bastille, and Fête de la Musique. In March 2010, he also toured around the United States and Canada with his friend and fellow French musician Tété where he performed at the Smithsonian Institution as part of an artist-in-residence program. Later that year he did a West Coast tour that took him from Portland to San Diego in promotion for his latest EP. It was during that tour that he performed at the DeYoung Museum as a part of an extensive French Impressionist masterpiece show on loan from Paris’ Musée d'Orsay. In late 2010, he was back in France releasing Portland Rendez-Vous and was interviewed on French National TV and Radio (France Inter, Virgin Radio). Beginning in January 2011, he found himself on the road again touring Idaho, Utah, Montana, and Washington where he was featured on various publications including the Missoula Independent and the Boise Weekly. Later in March on the East Coast he was playing shows in Boston, Providence, and New York City.

Apart from his own music, Eric has also completed his first project as a producer for local Portland musician Kory Quinn called "Waitin’ for a Train" which was released early 2012.

His new album "Dehors c'est l'Amérique" (Outside, it's America) coproduced with Rob Stroup at 8ball studio in Portland (Oregon) was released on March 23, 2012. Eric John Kaiser and his full band did a sold out CD Release show at Jimmy Mak's in Portland that same day. After that he went on tour in Oregon, Washington, Idaho, California and Vancouver BC to celebrate its release.

To talk about the release of his new album, Eric John Kaiser was also interviewed on KINK radio and performed with his full and in Pioneer Courthouse Square in downtown Portland on August 14, 2012.

In November 2012, to celebrate his marriage, Eric John Kaiser released a new four-song acoustic EP called 1+1=Freedom, a collection of love songs recorded as a duo with his wife Patti Kaiser.

2013 was a touring year for Eric John Kaiser, supporting his recent releases. He played on the East Coast (in Boston, Providence and New England), Canada (Quebec and Montreal) and in Montana, Colorado, Idaho and Eastern Washington and Oregon. He also played with his band in support of the Stereophonics in Portland and Seattle. In June he played in Paris at the Sentier des Halles accompanied by his wife Patti Kaiser on keyboard.

Dec 7, 2013, he released a new solo five-song CD: Le Pari. 50% of the proceeds of the sales of this record will go towards the non profit Pear Mentor (who builds positive relationships with homeless and transitional youth through music).

In May 2014, Kaiser went to isolate himself in a 100-year-old hotel (the Riverside Inn) in Lava Hot Springs, Idaho, and wrote songs for his new album. Back in Portland in the summer, he recorded those songs with his band at Dead Aunt Thelma's studio and New North Sound. This new album Idaho was released on October 25, 2014. In the fall, he toured the West Coast of the US and France to celebrate its release.

Photographer and film maker Kenton Waltz did a video of Eric John Kaiser's first single "Idaho".

In 2015, Eric John Kaiser received a grant from the "Centre de la Francophonie des Amériques" in Québec to go and participate in June to the "Village en Chansons" festival in Petite-Vallée in a region of Québec called the Gaspé Peninsula and also to the "Franco-fêtes" festival in Moncton, NB in October. A year later he returned to the Gaspé Peninsula to record his 5th album "Made in Gaspésie" with local French speaking musicians. This new album was released Sept 24th, 2017 and reached #14 at the World Chart in the US and Canada.

== Discography ==
Albums

- Made in Gaspésie (2016)
- Idaho (2014)
- French Troubadour (2009)
- Dehors c'est l'Amérique (Outside, it's America) (2012)
- French Troubadour (2009)
- L'Odyssée (2006)

EP's

- The Rye Room Sessions (2015)
- Le Pari (2013)
- 1+1=Freedom (2012)
- Portland Rendez-Vous (2010)
- Comme à la Maison (2004)
- Paris Acte I, Scène 1 (2005)

Compilations

- "L'Odyssée" included on the compilation CD PDX Pop Now! 2007
- "Une journée couleur pluie" was on the compilation "Indétendances" of the French Distributor: Fnac (2010)
- "Home!" was featured on the compilation "Home Grown" put together by the radio KINK (2012)

== Artistic Collaborations ==
French rapper Féniksi (aka Féfé) from the platinum selling Hip Hop band Saïan Supa Crew sings on 2 songs of Eric John Kaiser's album L'Odyssée: "Le Puzzle" and "Nos Vies".

French Artist Tété sings on 3 songs of Eric John Kaiser's French Troubadour album: "French Troubadour", "A l'ombre des étoiles" and "Natures Mortes".

In 2006 Eric John Kaiser did some background vocals on Philippe Katerine's Robots après tout album.
