= Alan Singley and Pants Machine =

American indie rock band

- Origin: Portland, Oregon, United States
- Genres: Indie, rock
- Years active: 2003-present
- Labels: Lucky Madison
- Members: Alan Singley; Gus Elg; Leb Borgerson; Scott Hayden
- Past members: Benjamin Jaspers; Ashley Allred

Alan Singley and Pants Machine is an Indie rock band from Portland, Oregon, made up of Alan Singley, Gus Elg, Leb Borgerson, and Scott Hayden. Alan Singley and Pants Machine is a fixture of the Portland, Oregon independent music scene. They've been featured twice on the PDX Pop Now! compilation, as among the Willamette Week's Best New Bands of 2006.

Alan Singley and Pants Machine are currently recording an orchestral record and playing the West Coast of the United States.

== Members ==
- Alan Singley - lead vocals
- Gus Elg - bass, recording
- Leb Borgerson - guitar, backup vocals
- Scott Hayden - drums

== Discography ==
- Oh, Salad Days (2003)
- Audiobicyclette (2005)
- Lovingkindness (2006)
- Feelin' Citrus (2009)
