= Dogheart =

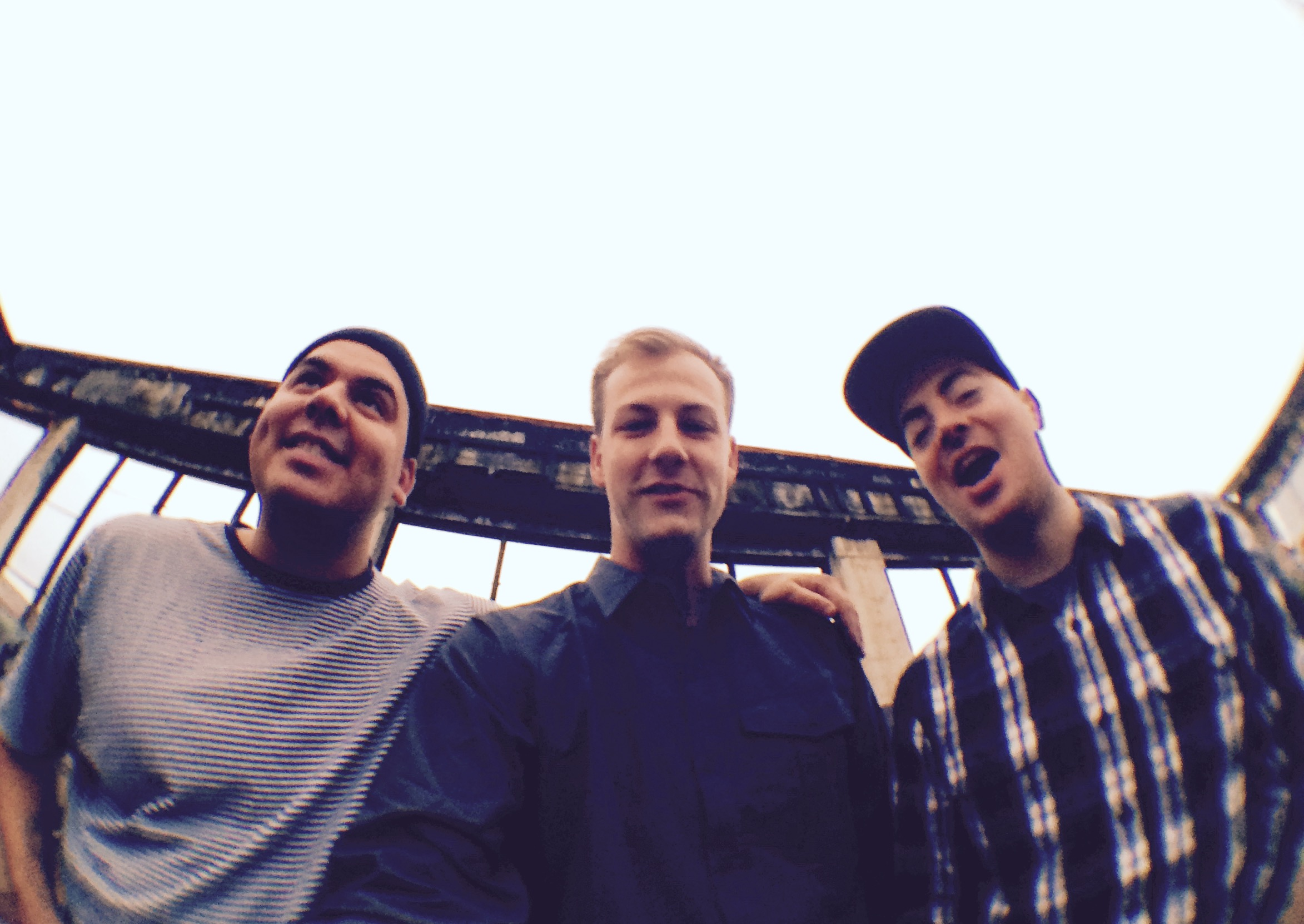

Background information
- Origin: Portland, OR
- Genre: Garage/Indie/Pop
- Years active: 2014 - Present
- Label: Haircut Records
- Members: Matt Jenkins; Gray Hildreth
- Past members: Cameron Hering
- Website: http://dogheartband.com

Dogheart is a garage/indie rock band, formed in Portland, Oregon in 2014 by Matt Jenkins (guitar, vocals), Gray Hildreth (bass), and Cameron Hering (drums).

Members of the group formed together after having played in different projects in the music scene in Portland. Collectively they were looking to start a new project from the ground up, and Dogheart came to be.

The band is described as having a sound that is, "not polished enough to be pop, but not quite rough around the edges enough to be garage rock."

== Music ==
Not long after releasing their first single, Dead Love, in 2014, the debut album, What Burns the Best, was released February 17, 2015. It was recorded at Secret Society Studios in Portland, OR with producer/engineer, Jeff Bond. According to the band, they took 40 songs into the studio, and recorded the best 10 for the album.

== Discography ==
Studio Albums

- What Burns the Best (2015)
- Real Mood EP (2016)
- Family Hair (2017)
- Beach Farm (2017)
- Yeah No For Sure (2019)
- Blue Guts EP (2019)
- Jumping the Ramp (2023)
- Balanced in the Void (2026)
