= Crow and the Canyon =

Bluegrass band from Portland, Oregon

- Origin: Portland, Oregon
- Years active: 2014-present

Crow and the Canyon is a bluegrass band from Portland, Oregon. The band formed in 2014.

In March, 2018, the band made a tour of Ethiopia, Eritrea, Uganda and Zambia sponsored by the U.S. Department of State to introduce bluegrass music to Africans by conducting workshops and performances. A Country Standard Time review of their 2015 album Leaving Soon said it was a "gentle folk-pop" sound, with notable harmonization of lead singers Ben Larsen and Leigh Jones. Larsen went on to create a solo album in 2021.
