= Quiz Zilla =

- Also known as: Zilla
- Born: Chad David Hernandez; November 12, 1986 (age 39); Portland, Oregon, U.S.
- Genres: Hip hop; Pop; R&B
- Occupations: Rapper; Singer; Songwriter
- Years active: 2009–present
- Labels: Crowded Rock; Tattoos & Band News
- Website: kingquizzilla.com

Chad David Hernandez (born November 12, 1986), known professionally as Quiz Zilla, is an American rapper, singer, and songwriter from Portland. He released his first album, 2che, in April 2016.

He is best known for his song "What If I Kidnapped You" featuring Strange label artist Krizz Kaliko on his debut studio album "2che" (2016).

== Career ==
On January 13, 2017, Quiz Zilla released single "Wolf in Sheep's Clothing". After releasing Wolf in Sheep's Clothing, Quiz Zilla released the music video "Words Were Never True". The video was directed by American film director Matt Alonzo. In April 2017, he released the single "Still Have Faith". The song was an inspiration to others going through hard times in life. After the release of the single "Still Have Faith", in October 2017, Quiz Zilla released his second album "Prince of the Low Life's".

== Discography ==
=== Albums ===
List of albums, with selected details
Title	Details
2che	Released: April 1, 2016; Label: Self-released; Formats: Digital download
Prince of the Low Lifes	Released: October 11, 2017; Label: Crowded Rock, Tattoos & Bad News; Formats: Digital download

== Singles ==
List of singles, showing year released and album name
Title	Year	Album
"I Do It for You"	2016	Non-album single
"Wolf in Sheep's Clothing"	2017	Prince of the Low Lifes
"Still Have Faith"	2017	Prince of the Low Lifes
"All for You"	2017	Prince of the Low Lifes
"Selfish With Love"	2017	Prince of the Low Lifes
"This Is How It Feels"	2019	Non-album single
