= Summer Cannibals (band) =

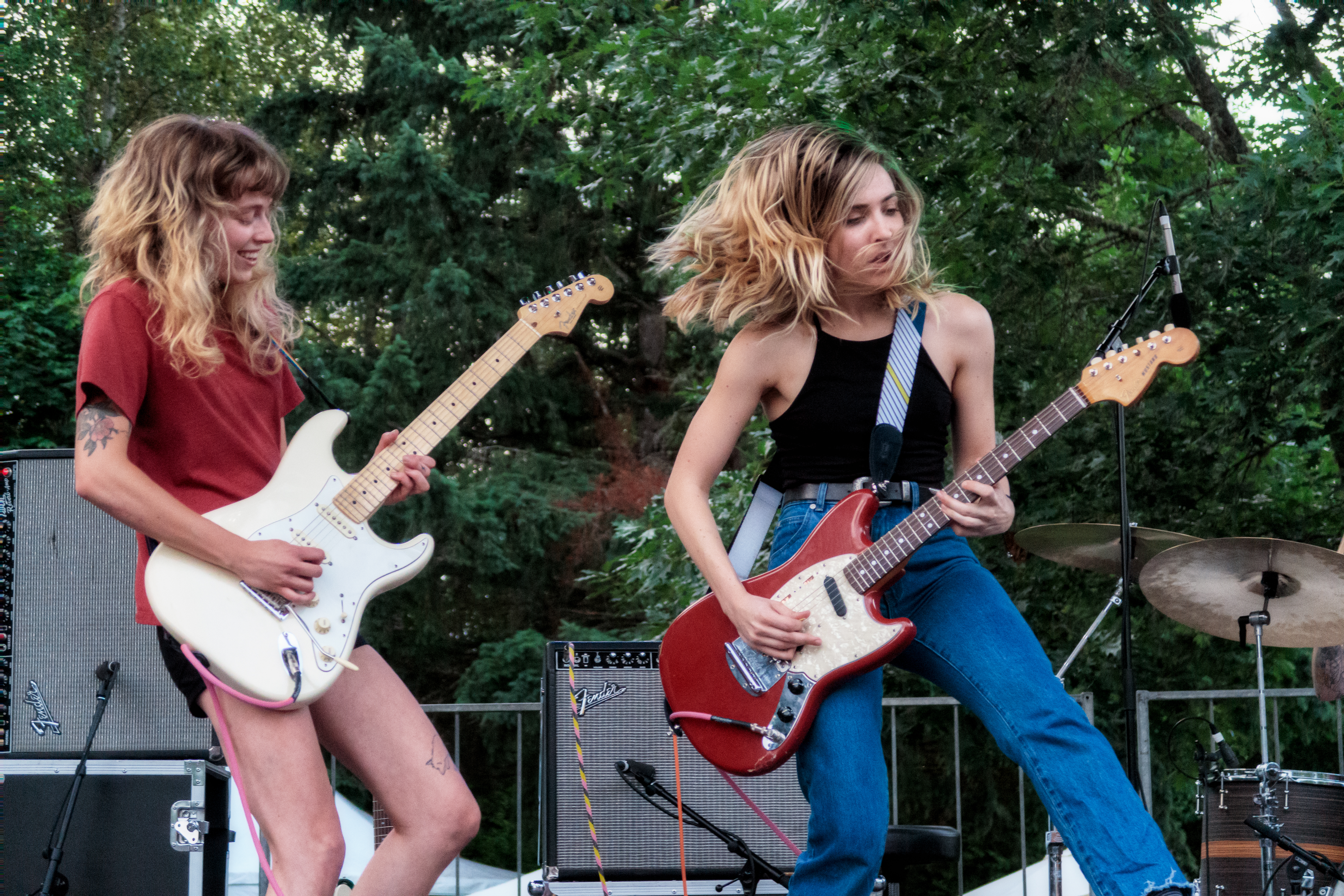
- Summer Cannibals in 2019

Background information
- Origin: Portland, Oregon, United States
- Genre: Rock
- Years active: 2012–2023, 2025–present
- Labels: New Moss; Kill Rock Stars
- Members: Jessica Boudreaux; Devon Shirley; Cassi Blum; Ethan Butman
- Past members: Marc Swart; Casey Frantum; Kyle Brittain; Jenny Logan; Valerie Brogden; Lynnae Gryffin
- Website: www.summercannibals.com

Summer Cannibals is a rock band from Portland, Oregon featuring lead singer and guitarist Jessica Boudreaux, drummer Devon Shirley (formerly of the bands The Photo Atlas and Red Orange Yellow), guitarist Cassi Blum and bassist Ethan Butman. Their debut album, No Makeup, was released on New Moss Records on August 6, 2013. Their follow up album, Show Us Your Mind, was produced, recorded, and mixed by Larry Crane and released on New Moss Records on March 3, 2015. The album received favorable reviews from critics such as Entertainment Weekly, which stated that the album featured “songs that refine the fuzzy garage-pop of its debut into something sharper, tighter, and much more difficult to shake off.”

Summer Cannibals toured nationwide supporting the Show Us Your Mind album, including sets at SXSW and CMJ in 2015. Following their return in the fall, the band recorded their third full-length album with Chris Woodhouse, the engineer on records from artists including Ty Segall, Thee Oh Sees and WAND.

In February 2016, the band announced that its third full-length album would be released on independent label Kill Rock Stars. Titled Full Of It, the first single of the album “Go Home” was featured on Spin. Two months later the band premiered an official music video for the second single, “Full Of It”, on Stereogum. In April 2016, NPR premiered the single "Simple Life" from the forthcoming Full Of It album. Pitchfork gave the Full Of It album a 7.2, stating that it balanced “flame-belching Mad Max riffage with lyrics frankly exploring questions of codependence and need.” The band had their television debut on May 26, 2016 when they performed two songs on Last Call With Carson Daly. In May 2016, Summer Cannibals performed at the Sasquatch! Music Festival at The Gorge Amphitheatre. The music video for the single "Say My Name" was directed by Rob "Whitey" McConnaughy and was premiered on The Wall Street Journal.

On March 28, 2023 Jessica Boudreaux announced the group had disbanded. On July 31, 2025, Boudreaux announced that the band had reformed and was working on their 5th studio album.

== Discography ==
- No Makeup (2013, New Moss Records)
- Show Us Your Mind (2015, New Moss Records)
- Full Of It (2016, Kill Rock Stars)
- Can’t Tell Me No (2019, Tiny Engines)
