= Sara Jackson-Holman =

American singer-songwriter

Sara Jackson-Holman is an American singer-songwriter based in Los Angeles, CA. Born in 1988 or 1989, she is a classically trained pianist; her style has been compared to that of Feist, Adele, and Lana Del Rey. Her songs have been used in episodes of the television series Hemlock Grove, Castle, Grey's Anatomy, Bones, 90210, Pretty Little Liars, Orange Is the New Black, and The Fosters.

She relocated to Los Angeles, California, from her home in Portland, Oregon. She is currently represented by record label Expunged Records.

== Discography ==
- When You Dream (2010)
- A Very Merry (EP, 2010)
- Cardiology (2012)
- River Queen (EP, 2014)
- Didn't Go To The Party (2016)

== Discovery ==
A fan post online that Jackson-Holman left for Portland, Oregon-based Indie-pop band Blind Pilot caught the attention of their label's president. She was soon signed to their label with no formal demo.

Jackson-Holman is a lifetime student of piano and a veteran classical performer. Her mother inspired her as a teen to write her own songs.

== Artistry ==
=== Musical style ===
Sara Jackson-Holman's music fits in the Pop/Alternative music genre, and her musical style is described as slow, expansive ballads balancing against hip-hop inflected upbeat tracks, all with a slight classical tinge. Her music has been compared to that of Feist, Adele, and Lana Del Rey. However, much of her music is inspired by music by Chopin, Schumann and Bach. This is reflected in her minor, brooding tones and sense of musical structure. She adds strings and layers of warm and soulful melodies in each song. Jackson-Holman's songs are also emotion-filled and often inspired by real-life experiences.

Her album When You Dream carries the common themes of love and longing, forgetting and remembering, the sky and trees, and dreams of the sea in a timeless manner. While the themes of When You Dream were intended to be universal, Jackson-Holman's album Cardiology was inspired by her own life experiences and heart. The album was conceived during a year in which Jackson-Holman's grandfather died. He had been a strong influence in her musical upbringing and his passing resulted in a difficult time for Jackson-Holman and her family. Jackson-Holman reflects on her grandfather, saying, “My grandfather was a big part of my musical upbringing and his death came as a shock. When I was young he would drive three hours from Portland to Bend just to watch me play for seven minutes in my classical piano competitions, and when I had branched out into pop music, he'd come to my shows in Portland. I was in the midst of recording and needing to be creative, so the process became an outlet for my confusion and grief. His death was profoundly influential as I wrote the final songs for my album. 'Freight Train' is a song I wrote when I had no words to express my grief. 'Come By Fire', 'Can't Take My Love', and 'For Albert' (his middle name) were also all written within three weeks of his passing. ('For Albert' is derivative of the classical piece 'Für Elise', a sort of homage to my background). I miss him very much, and to me, his being so much a part of my songs keeps him and his memory close to my heart.”

While Cardiology primarily concerned grief and loss, River Queen centers around finding strength in vulnerability, having the will to fight, and learning to love fully and without regret. Speaking of her album River Queen, Jackson-Holman states, “I want this record to fill people with happiness and hope."

== Concerts and tours ==
Sara Jackson-Holman's first concert was on June 3, 2010, at the Woods in Sellwood, Oregon, Jackson-Holman's home state. Jackson-Holman has since performed mostly in states in the western United States, such as Washington, New Mexico, Texas, Wyoming, Montana, and California, but has also performed in states such as Kansas and Illinois as well.
