= Leigh Marble =

- Origin: Portland, Oregon, United States
- Genres: Indie rock, Folk
- Occupations: Singer/songwriter, record producer
- Years active: 1990s-present

Leigh Marble is a singer/songwriter and record producer living in Portland, Oregon. Over the past eight years, he has released three albums whose approach to indie rock and folk music has been described as "punk Americana".

== Early life ==
The son of two Harvard, Massachusetts software engineers and nephew of science fiction novelist Piers Anthony, Leigh Marble is also the direct descendant of 19th century spiritualist Hiram Marble who spent years vainly searching for pirate's treasure that he believed lay buried within the abandoned cave of Dungeon Rock (now part of the Lynn Woods Reservation of eastern Massachusetts). Marble has maintained a lifelong fascination with the more macabre fringes of colonial history, and he has acknowledged that this obsessive interest in the "spooky/gothic side of American folklore" has substantially influenced his music.

Through his teen years, the young Marble actively pursued music in and out of school, but he'd always considered himself more of a budding poet or novelist. It was only after an introduction to Suzanne Vega and similarly styled singer-songwriters during Marble's undergraduate tenure at Brown University that he first saw how these twin passions could be combined. In particular, Ani DiFranco's blend of stylized instrumental facility and trenchant lyrics proved to be influential. (Marble has compiled the guitar tablature for dozens of DiFranco songs and still oversees the AniTabs web site.)

== Career ==
=== Peep (1997–2004) ===
After graduating from Brown in 1997, Marble moved across the country to Portland, Oregon. Throughout the late 1990s, he regularly performed at a diverse array of popular venues throughout the area including Satyricon (nightclub), Berbati's, and the Ash Street Saloon and became "a fixture on the Portland music scene".

From 1997 through 1998, Marble gained experience in the business side of musical promotions while serving as an employee of indie label Undercover Records. During this time, Marble contributed several articles about production techniques for music recording magazine Tape Op and assisted founding editor Larry Crane (the producer of Death Cab for Cutie, Sleater-Kinney, and Stephen Malkmus) with varied aspects of publication from within Crane's SE Portland office (also the site of Jackpot! Recording Studio). In admiration of Marble's talents, Crane helmed production for Marble and Brown classmate Erin McKeown's 1999 seven inch split single Anticipation et Denouement.

As Marble continued to develop his reputation as a live performer, the artist's burgeoning catalog of original songs had grown as well. However, aside from that split single, he hadn't released any new material since Hit The Ceiling – a cassette-only collection of early solo material recorded during Marble's senior year at Brown and produced by Dave Auchenbach, formerly of 90s indie legends Small Factory, that earned critical comparison to Vic Chestnutt.

Finally, on November 7, 2004, Marble put out his debut full-length CD Peep through his own Laughing Stock Records imprint. Recorded in his "Fishboy Studios" basement with the aid of drummer Scott Garvey, Marble produced and arranged the twelve tracks himself with Jeff Stuart Saltzman (Grails (band), The Standard (band)) and John Fischbach (Stevie Wonder, Carole King) responsible for mixing and mastering, respectively.

=== Red Tornado (2004–2011) ===
Now that Marble had built a fanbase around Portland through playing live shows at diverse venues, he began tinkering with the traditional folk troubadour blueprint – bringing along a drummer and, in time, an organist. The occasional trio had an ever larger list of material to work through, and, on October 23, 2007, he released sophomore album Red Tornado. Another self-produced album recorded from within his home studio, critics compared the expansive roots-flavored collection to Gomez (band) and Explosions in the Sky.

Over the previous decade, Marble had earned a reputation in the studio for his work remixing a variety of local and international artists including Jared Mees, Swallows, Pay The Coyote, and Necessary Intergalactic Cooperation. With the release of the Twister EP on October 7, 2008, Marble allowed contemporaries Urbex and Teledubgnosis to return the favor by contributing remixes of songs from Red Tornado alongside his own dub-heavy reworkings (credited to his hip-hop alias Dr. Marble).

A limited edition CD featuring hand-assembled packaging by Stumptown Printing was released under the Laughing Stock banner, and a video for the Teledubgnosis-produced track "Lucky Bastards (King County Jail Dub)" was directed by Dharma Bums (band) frontman and northwest music icon Jeremy Wilson.

That same month, Marble recorded the track "Inebriate Waltz" for a compilation to benefit Portland's Lone Fir Cemetery. The resulting album Dearly Departed featured a notable selection of area musicians (including Storm Large, Holcombe Waller, and Pete Krebs of Hazel (band)), and many of them, including Marble, played a celebratory concert in the cemetery grounds.

Two years later, he contributed a version of Led Zeppelin's "Immigrant Song" for the Jealous Butcher compilation The Land of Ice And Snow: The Songs of Led Zeppelin alongside a star-studded line-up featuring such artists as Chris Walla, M. Ward, and The Long Winters. The long-awaited collection – fifty tracks in all, including digital bonus tracks – was released on October 12, 2010, as a two CD package digital bonus tracks) with cover illustration from Carson Ellis.

=== Where The Knives Meet Between The Rows (2011–present) ===
Despite the positive press reception for Red Tornado and a growing national profile (aided by his newfound presence on Pandora Radio), Marble was forced to curtail touring plans once he learned that his longtime girlfriend had developed breast cancer. Following her 2007 diagnosis, Marble spent much of the next few years aiding his partner in her fight for recovery. Although treatments were initially successful and her doctors believed the cancer had gone into remission only twelve months later, the emotional torment of this difficult period directly fueled the creation of third album Where the Knives Meet Between the Rows.

During this time, Marble had been turning away from the roots and folk genres with which he'd become associated, and he found himself inspired by such artists as Brian Eno and The Velvet Underground. As well, he began opening up his live shows to experimentation through onstage collaboration with Americana troupe the Ascetic Junkies.

Though he'd originally intended on expanding his trademark singer-songwriter sound by assembling a five-piece band (and countering a reputation for meticulous craftsmanship by recording the group's live performance), creative differences and unavoidable complications splintered the quintet before they ever entered the studio. He did rely upon contributions from Erin McKeown, Rachel Taylor Brown, Jesse Emerson (The Decemberists, Casey Neill), and Matt Harmon and Kali Giaritta (of the Ascetic Junkies) for instrumental backing.

The combination of rich musical textures and grimly personal subject matter led to Marble's strongest notices yet. Where The Knives Meet Between The Rows was selected as one of the year's ten best albums by influential web-based indie bazaar CD Baby. Reviewers compared the "bluesy noir ambience" to Tom Waits, Leonard Cohen, and Lou Reed. However, with the return of his partner's cancer shortly before the album's April 24, 2012 release (and soon after the birth of their daughter), he once again was forced to abandon plans for extensive touring.

While familial constraints have prevented cross country jaunts in support of his music, Marble has continued to perform around the northwest as both a troubadour and leader of a small ensemble, and he's now primarily concentrating upon broadening the dimensions of his solo act. Similarly, he has augmented the role of videos as a means of communicating with an increasingly far flung fanbase.

Despite his current focus – work has reportedly begun on a yet-untitled project of unknown scope – Marble still helms the occasional re-mix of local artists, and he's expressed interest in surrendering production duties of the forthcoming album for the first time.

=== The Buttery Lords ===
As Dr. Marble, Leigh was one of satirical rap group The Buttery Lords' three founding members. The act had played intermittently around Portland since 1999 and shared bills with such performers as Matisyahu, MC Paul Barman, and Vanilla Ice. In 2001, utilizing a live rhythm section, Larry Crane recorded the group's debut Buttered For Her Pleasure at Jackpot Studios.

The self-released album received little promotion at the time, and, five years later, the trio remastered the original songs and added commentary tracks for a "Collector's Edition" well received by the critics. After a decade long recording absence (aside from 2010 single "Famous In Portland"), The Buttery Lords went back into the studio for the Halloween-themed EP Monsters & Madness released on October 25, 2011.

== Discography ==
- Peep (2004)
- Red Tornado (2007)
- Where The Knives Meet Between The Rows (2012)
