= The Severin Sisters =

American folk music band

The Severin Sisters are an American roots band consisting of Amy Severin and Heidi Severin (born September 25, 1983), twin sisters from Salem, Oregon. Younger sister, Haley Severin, officially joined the band in 2017, after years of making special appearances. They have participated in musical festivals and competitions on the state and national levels, ranking highly in several. They have toured the Pacific Northwest since 2001, including opening gigs for the Nitty Gritty Dirt Band.

At the age of 14, Amy placed second in the Oregon State Banjo Championship. In 2002, she placed 10th in the National Banjo Competition held in Winfield, Kansas.

Heidi won second place at the National Mandolin Championship in 2002.

In 2000, the duo recorded their first album, Too Many Miles. The following year they recorded Let's Talk. Their most recent album, released in 2003, is Carefree Times. Carefree Times was re-released with new graphics June 2007. They have collaborated with such musicians as John Carter Cash and John Cowan of New Grass Revival, and Nashville songwriters Dean Miller and Sarah Majors.

Each sister graduated from Oregon State University with a bachelor's degree in music. They both now teach music in the Salem-Keizer School District.
