= Swan Sovereign =

Dirty Martini
- Origin: Portland, Oregon, United States
- Genres: Indie rock, Indie pop
- Years active: 2005–present
- Label: Pampelmoose
- Members: Stephanie Schneiderman; McKinley; Lara Michell; Ned Failing
- Past members: Lea Krueger

Swan Sovereign (previously Dirty Martini) is a three piece indie pop band from Portland, Oregon. The band was founded by three singer songwriters and multi-instrumentalists Stephanie Schneiderman (drums), Lara Michell (guitar) and Christine McKinley (bass), who write all the group's songs and share the vocal duties. The band uniquely blends folk, rock, Americana, and pop to form an eclectic explosion of beautiful harmonies, sharp song writing, and heartbreaking melancholy. Their latest album, Tea and Revenge, was released in September 2006, and was produced by John Askew (FILMguerrero) and Dave Allen (Gang of Four). Tea and Revenge was released by Pampelmoose and is the follow-up to their acclaimed self-titled debut album.

== Origins ==
The band formed during the early 2000s, as the three leading ladies played several shows together. Prior to forming the band, Schneiderman, Michell and McKinley had all had some success: one toured with David Crosby as his opening act, one won a place on the Lillith Fair tour, and one was in the band Carmina Pirhana, who composed music for the Oregon Ballet. Their first appearance together was at a Portland Valentine's Day songwriter-in-the-round formatted show. They began road-tripping to shows together, performing as separate artists. It wasn't long though until they began playing as a three-piece band. They all wrote, sang and played multiple instruments. They kept the theater-in-the-round format until David Allen, Gang of Four's bass player, suggested, "Why don't you stand up and be a proper band already?". Lea Krueger was initially also a member but left to pursue a solo career after recording the band's debut album. The debut album sold around 7,000 copies.

The band cite PJ Harvey, Aimee Mann, and Kristin Hersh as influences.

== Members ==
- Stephanie Schneiderman (drums)
- Lara Michell (guitar)
- Christine McKinley (bass)

== Discography ==
=== Studio albums ===
| Title | Date | Label |
|---|---|---|
| Dirty Martini | 8 February 2005 | Pampelmoose |
| Tea and Revenge | 26 September 2006 | Pampelmoose |
