= Tony Matthews =

Australian author and historian (born 1949)

Tony Matthews is an Australian author and historian. His first book, This Dawning Land was completed in 1986.

He has written over thirty published books.

== Books ==
- Cloaked in Bravery: A Rescue Mission Like No Other (2023)
- Spies, Saboteurs and Secret Missions of World War II (2022)
- Sea Monsters: Savage Submarine Commanders of World War Two (2021)
- How the World Allowed Hitler to Proceed with the Holocaust: Tragedy at Evian (2020)
- A Dawn with no Birdsong (2019)
- This Dawning Land (1986)
