= Akem Manah (band) =

American doom metal band

- Origin: Eugene, Oregon, U.S.
- Genres: Death-doom
- Years active: 2009–present
- Label: Freak Metal
- Members: Dead Nedry
- Past members: Kyle Simms; Mike Bonnetti; Robert Ingraham; Brian Murray

Akem Manah is an American death-doom band from Eugene, Oregon, formed in 2009. They have released three albums and one EP. Since April 2012, Dead Nedry is the only founding member and the only current member of the band.

== History ==
=== 2009–2012: Band formation and first two albums ===
Akem Manah was formed in 2009 in Seattle, Washington by Dead Nedry and Kyle Simms. The original lineup was Dead Nedry (vocals & guitar), Mike Bonnetti (guitar), Kyle Simms (bass) & Brian Murray (drums). In 2009, the band made their initial demo. Up to January 2010, this group continued to produce music and perform. Kyle Simms left after the rest of the band made the move to Seattle in October and couldn't continue commuting back and forth.

In January 2010, Robert Ingraham was brought in to replace Kyle. They recorded their second demo called "The Devil". Mike Bonnetti left the band soon after. In February 2010, the band entered the studio and recorded their first album The Devil is In All of You. It was released on July 9, 2010.

In the following months after the release of the debut album, the band released two singles, "Children Of Evil" and "Funeralopolis" (a cover of an Electric Wizard song).

On March 29, 2011, the band released an EP called Horror In The Eyes. It featured songs that were recorded during the recording of the debut album. The two previously released single were featured on this EP. Horror in the Eyes has had a few good reviews since its release.

In July 2011, Nedry stated that they were planning to begin work on a new EP in August. But it had been pushed back until November due to busy schedules of all the members. In December it was stated through the band's Facebook page that they would enter the studio in January to record their album, Night Of The Black Moon.

On February 24 the band released the single "Witches Ride" for free digitally via CD Baby. The song also became available on the compilation, Humid Records: Vol.1, on March 12 on Amazon along with their song "Creatures In The Walls" (mis-labeled as, by Dead Nedry). Night Of The Black Moon was released on March 23, 2012.

=== 2012–present: Lineup change and third album ===
In April 2012, it was announced via the band's Facebook the Brain Murray and Robert Ingraham had left the band to focus on college and their careers. It was stated that a new EP was in the works and that former White Zombie drummer Ivan de Prume and former Nile bassist Chris Lollis would be featured on the recording.

A new single from the upcoming studio release called "Reign Of Terror", was released on December 14, 2012. It featured lead guitar by Scott Von Heldt. It was announced in early 2013 that the EP had become an album, Demons Of The Sabbat, set for release in late 2013.

== Members ==
Current

- Dead Nedry – lead vocals, guitars, keyboards (2009–present)

Former

- Kyle Simms – bass (2009–2010)
- Mike Bonnetti – guitars (2009–2010, 2011)
- Brian Murray – drums, percussion (2009–2012)
- Robert Ingraham – bass (2010–2012)

Session

- Chris Lollis (ex-Nile) – Bass (2012, 2013–present)
- Ivan de Prume (ex-White Zombie) – Drums (2012–present)
- Adam Richardson (ex-Ramesses) – Vocals (2012)
- Scott Von Heldt (ex-Brian "Head" Welch) – Lead Guitar (2012)

Live

- Jason Thrash – guitars (2010)

== Discography ==
=== Albums ===
- The Devil Is in All of You (2010)
- Night of the Black Moon (2012)
- Demons of the Sabbat (2014)

=== Miscellaneous ===
- Akem Manah (Demo, 2009)
- The Devil (Demo, 2010)
- Horror In The Eyes (EP, 2011)
- Akem Manah (Compilation, 2012)

=== Compilations appearances ===
- Humid Records Vol. 1 (digital Humid Records 2012)
