= Mordecai (band) =

American synth pop band from Portland, Oregon

- Origin: Portland, Oregon, U.S.
- Genres: Synth pop, indie pop, emo
- Years active: 2014–present
- Members: Andrew Endres; Kate Kilbourne; Nick Quiller
- Website: www.mordecaipdx.com

Mordecai is an American synth pop band from Portland, Oregon. The band self-released their debut full-length album It's Never Enough on August 30, 2017. The band consists of Andrew Endres (lead vocals, bass), Kate Kilbourne (synthesisers, violin, vocals) and Nick Quiller (drums, samplers).

== History ==
Mordecai formed in 2014 and gained traction by performing live and promoting themselves on the internet and through their fans.

Their debut album It's Never Enough was released on August 30, 2017. The album was highly received by critics, with reviews from Telegram, Lemonwire, WorldNews, Vortex Magazine, High Note, and other outlets.

In late 2016, the band embarked on a West Coast tour of the United States and Mexico from Seattle, Washington to Tijuana, Mexico to Salt Lake City, Utah. In 2017 the band embarked on a three month long European Tour spanning 11 countries including Italy, Germany, France, Denmark, Belgium, The Netherlands, Czech Republic, Spain, Portugal, Switzerland, and Austria.

== Discography ==
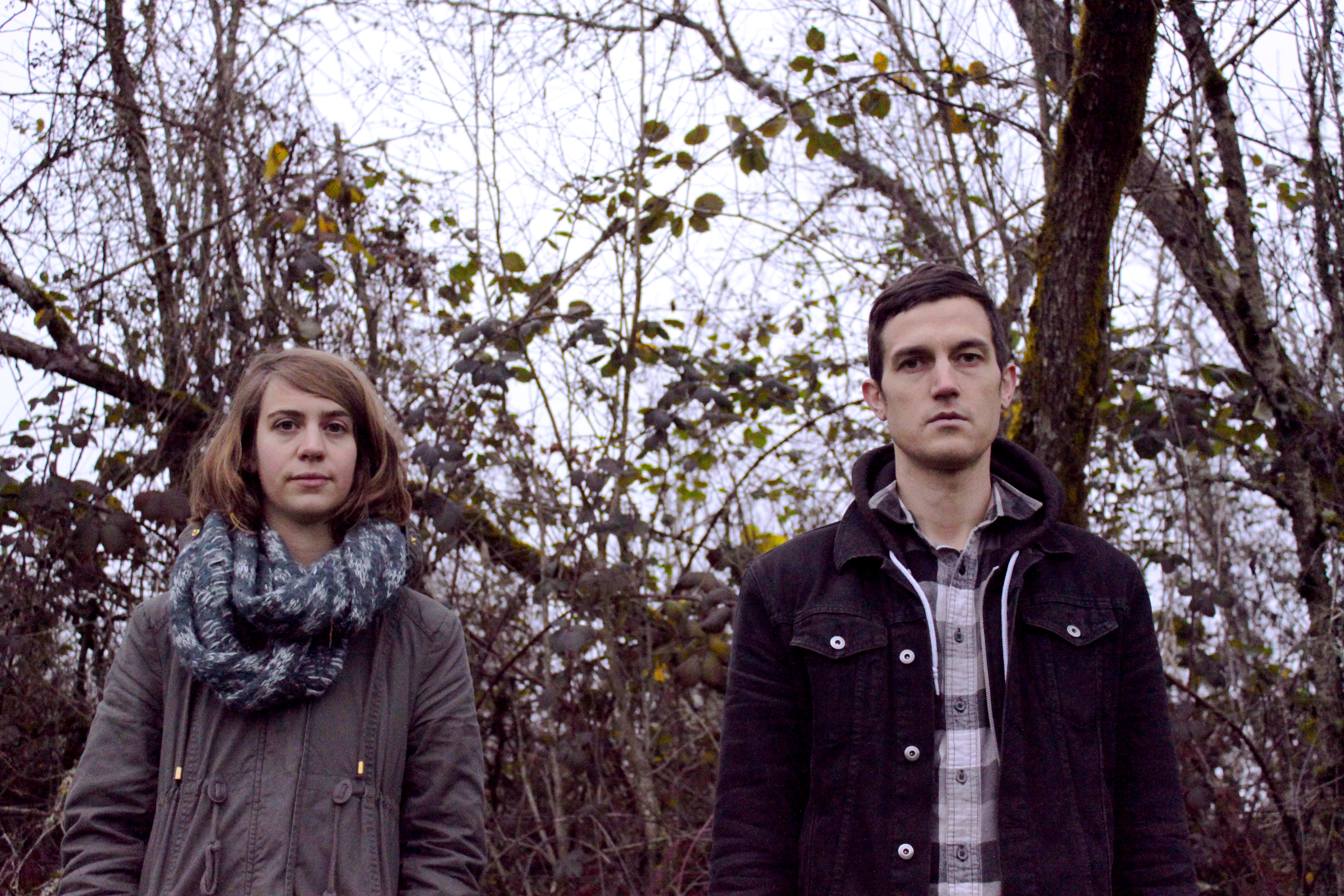
Mordecai, Portland, Oregon (2017)

=== Albums ===
- It's Never Enough (2017)

=== Singles ===
- Alone (2016)
