= Bruxa (band) =

American electronic band

- Origin: Portland, Oregon
- Genres: Witch house, witchstep, dubstep, experimental, Portuguese
- Years active: 2011–2017
- Labels: Sweating Tapes; Mishka
- Members: Derek Stilwell; Bianca Radd; Saint Michael Lorenzo

Bruxa are an American electronic band from Portland, Oregon. The group consists of DJ/producer Derek Stilwell and vocalists Bianca Radd and Saint Michael Lorenzo. Their sound has been labelled witch house; however, Stilwell describes their sound as "witchstep," an experimental combination of witch house and dubstep they pioneered.

In 2011, the band released their debut EP, Eye on Everybody, on Sweating Tapes. This was followed by their first album, Victimeyez, released jointly on the labels Sweating Tapes and Mishka Records in 2012. The group released a second album, I Don't Love You Anymore, on Miskha Records in 2014.

The band's name is taken from the Portuguese word for "witch." Radd, who is half-Brazilian, sings in Portuguese.
