= Strength (American band) =

American disco-rock band

- Origin: Portland, Oregon, United States
- Genres: Disco, rock
- Members: Bailey Winters; John Zeigler; Patrick Morris

Strength is a disco-rock band from Portland, Oregon, made up of Bailey Winters, John Zeigler, and Patrick Morris. Their 2006 debut album, Going Strong, on Community Disco, was produced and recorded by Chris Anderson at Animal Kingdom and mastered by Nilesh Patel at The Exchange.

Their second album, Mind-Reader, was self-recorded and then mixed by Jake Portrait at the Odditorium and Wave Cave in Portland. It was also mastered by Patel at The Exchange.

== Members ==
- Bailey Winters – lead vocals
- John Zeigler – keyboards, synth bass, backup vocals
- Patrick Morris – guitar, mpc, bass, backup vocals

== Discography ==
- Going Strong (2006)
- Mind-Reader (2010)
