= Key of Dreams =

Acoustic guitar jazz fusion ensemble from Portland, Oregon

Key of Dreams is an acoustic guitar jazz fusion ensemble from Portland, Oregon that has been performing since 2003. Founding members Eric Schultheis and Abe Wirth take their inspiration from classical, metal, jazz, flamenco, funk, rock and electronic styles of music.

The Portland Oregonian says that Key of Dreams "offers a snapshot of the eclectic charm and excellent musicianship that keep Portland's music scene green and outside the mainstream. [They] present acoustic fusion rock that is as smooth and pretty as it is unpredictable."

The band has released three independent recordings: Key of Dreams, unlocked, and mile _9. Percussionist Doug Narry joins Mr. Wirth and Mr. Schultheis on the latter two recordings. Key of Dreams performs regularly throughout the Pacific Northwest.

The name "Key of Dreams" is taken from the 1930 surrealist painting by René Magritte.
