= Harold Vincent Milligan =

American musician and musical writer

- Born: October 31, 1888; Astoria, Oregon, U.S.
- Died: April 12, 1951 (aged 62); New York City, U.S.
- Occupation: Organist,
- Known for: writer on the topic of music, and biographer of Stephen Foster

Harold Vincent Milligan was an American professional musician and musical writer. He is best known for his biography about the life of Stephen Foster.

== Early life ==
His first public performance was at the age of 12. At 17 he was the organist for Calvary Presbyterian Church in Portland and a Portland synagogue. Harold Vincent Milligan performed as the organist in various churches where his father was the pastor. He traveled widely in his youth and made his way through Washington, Idaho, Oregon and New York City.

He moved to New York in 1904 to study at Guilmant Organ School. In 1907, he studied with William Crane Carl who taught at the Guilment Organ School and who was the organist for the Old First Presbyterian Church. Other teachers instructing Milligan included: T. Tertius Noble, Clement R. Gale, and Arthur E. Johnstone. Milligan also performed at the Guilmant Organ School. Milligan himself taught at the school.

He served as executive director of the National Music League from 1925 to 1935. During this same time, he received a grant from the Rockefeller Foundation and issued a subsequent report about good music radio broadcasts called "God Music and You".

In addition to being a musician, he was consulted and then supervised the installation of the organ during construction of Riverside Church.

== Career ==
After teaching at the Guilment Organ school, he was employed as the organist at the First Presbyterian Church of Orange, New Jersey. He then moved on to Rutgers Presbyterian Church in New York. There he stayed for five years. Afterwards, he played two years for Plymouth Church in Brooklyn. In 1915 he became organist at the Fifth Avenue Baptist Church (later Riverside Church) in New York until his retirement in 1940. He served as president of the National Association of Organists (1929–32) and national secretary of the American Guild of Organists (1926–51).

Milligan is best known for his biography of the 19th century composer and lyricist Stephen Foster. He spent much effort in collecting and editing undiscovered American songs from the 18th-century. Most of these newly discovered music manuscripts were written by Francis Hopkinson. Milligan wrote the first biography of Stephen Foster in (1920).

He was very much involved with the opera during his lifetime. He was a commentator and associate director for the Metropolitan Opera radio programs. He was a lecturer on opera for Columbia University. He also worked for the Diapason and The New Music Review as their music critic. He contributed content for the American Organist and the Woman's Home Companion. He was knowledgeable on other topics related to music of the times. He wrote "Stories of Famous Operas in 1950. Milligan was the editor of "The Best Known Hymns and Prayers of the American people in 1942. In 1948, he was an editor, along with Geraldine Souvaine of The Opera Quiz Book. He composed pieces for children: The Outlaws of Etiquette in 1914 and The Laughabet in 1913. He wrote a variety of other pieces. Some were plays, secular and religious choral arrangements and music for the organ.

Mrs. Harold Milligan was part of the Women's Radio Committee and in a May 22, 1935 letter to the editor of Variety Magazine expressed her opinion that radio should remain uncensored but advertising needed to be controlled.

== Compositions and other works ==
- Milligan, Harold Vincent, 1888–1951, "Ain't gonna study war no more", arranged by Harold Vincent Milligan. 1924
- Milligan, Harold Vincent, 1888–1951 "Album of songs : a collection of twenty favorite compositions by Stephen C. Foster"; collected and edited by Harold Vincent Milligan. 1921
- Milligan, Harold Vincent, 1888–1951 "First American composer" by Francis Hopkinson (1737–1791) Editor and augmented. by Harold V. Milligan. 1918
- Milligan, Harold Vincent, 1888–1951 Pioneer American composers, a collection of early American songs, edited. and augmented by Harold Vincent Milligan. 1921
- Milligan, Harold Vincent, 1888–1951 "Stephen Collins Foster : a biography of America's folk-song composer" by Harold Vincent Milligan. 1920
