= Starover Blue =

- Also known as: Cartoon Bar Fight
- Genres: Dream pop, indie rock
- Years active: 2007-present
- Website: www.staroverblue.com

Starover Blue is an American experimental dream pop band from Portland, OR, with roots in San Jose, CA. Their sound has been described as "a darker, moodier take on traditional synth-pop," layering "familiar, warm Juno synthesizer tones" with "somber, contralto vocals." Comparisons have been drawn to the Scottish band Cocteau Twins as well as Wye Oak, The Antlers, and Low Roar.

== History ==
=== Origins ===
The band formed in 2007 under the name Cartoon Bar Fight when founding members Kendall Sallay (lead vocals, guitar) and Dirk Milotz (synthesizer, guitar) met in the music department at San Jose State University. Sallay studied operatic vocal performance while Milotz pursued a degree in composition. They began by playing an offshoot of "indie-folk."

By 2009, the band's sound evolved, becoming more experimental and layered and relying heavily on analog synthesizer. The departure from folk instrumentation and acoustic arrangements occurred as the group solidified a core lineup consisting of Sallay, Milotz, Joel Zelaya (ambient/lead guitar), Max Rogers (bass), and Jerald Bittle (drums).

In mid-2014, the band changed its name to Starover Blue, in reference to a character from Vladmir Nabokov's Pale Fire. The existing lineup recorded and produced the band's second LP, Spacegeist, prior to disbanding when Sallay and Milotz relocated from San Jose to Portland, OR.

=== Relocation ===
In early 2016, Sallay and Milotz moved to Portland, OR and rebuilt the band's lineup, adding James Alton on drums and Kyle Polensky on bass. On August 12, 2016, Spacegeist premiered online on PopMatters and was officially released on August 26.

== Discography ==
=== Ordinary Magic (2019) ===
Ordinary Magic, the band's latest LP, premiered August 20th, 2019. The record was described as "a synth-saturated opus that draws inspiration from classical music, pop and country as well as sci-fi and dystopian speculative fiction."

=== Moneystealer EP (2017) ===
Moneystealer premiered online August 25, 2017.

=== Spacegeist (2016) ===
Spacegeist is the band's second LP, and the first LP released under the name Starover Blue. The sixteen-track album was self-recorded at Big Sky Ranch in Big Bear, CA. It is described as "a dream pop concept album" with sci-fi imagery, intricate harmonies, and "nostalgic analog synth," that examines "how different people and landscapes are affected by dependence on technology.” The album includes several brief piano compositions shrouded in ambient noise, reflective of the band's experience playing music for years in Silicon Valley and feeling drowned out by the predominant tech culture.

Album singles include the title track, Spacegeist, described as "sparkly" and "sad yet celebratory all at once" as well as Summer Snow.

=== The Labyrinth Suite E.P. (2013) ===
The Labyrinth Suite E.P. was originally released under the band's previous name, Cartoon Bar Fight. The three tracks, Mechropolis, Into the Labyrinth, and Saturnine challenged the band's ‘folk’ moniker altogether, showing a side that delved more into futuristic psych-rock and dark synth-pop. Remixed and remastered versions of these tracks appear on Spacegeist.

=== Reincarnate (2012) ===
Reincarnate, the band's first LP, was originally released under the band's previous name, Cartoon Bar Fight. The eleven-track concept album, which focuses on themes of death and rebirth, was described as eerie, cerebral, and inquisitive, as opposed to depressing or macabre. It veers from folk into "experimental soundscapes" with heavier rock sections, while still retaining many softer moments.

=== Tell All the Children E.P. (2011) ===
Tell All the Children E.P. was originally released under the band's previous name, Cartoon Bar Fight. Several tracks are no longer available online.

== In other media ==
In 2017 Starover Blue was featured in the short film Waltzing Tilda with their songs 'Golden Hour' and 'A Flower in Space'.

Song	Album	Media
"The Marquee"	Reincarnate	See What I'm Saying - 2010 Theatrical Trailer
"A Flower in Space"	Spacegeist	Waltzing Tilda - 2017 Theatrical Trailer
