= Maria Catherine Callahan =

American singer-songwriter

- 2014 Bi-Mart Willamette Country Music Festival

Background information
- Born: Maria Catherine Callahan; Portland, Oregon, USA
- Occupation: Singer-songwriter
- Instruments: Acoustic, electric lead, rhythm and slide guitars, bass, banjo, keyboards, percussion
- Website: www.reverbnation/mariacatherinecallahan.com

Maria Catherine Callahan (born June 22, 1965) is an American singer-songwriter from Portland, Oregon. In the 1990s Callahan was lead vocalist, guitarist and co-songwriter for the critically acclaimed Portland, Oregon, power pop band Doris Daze. Doris Daze released two albums, Uncle (1994) and Perpetual Happiness Machine (1997) before disbanding in 1999.

A multi-instrumentalist who is admittedly "A little too fond of the recording process", Callahan has had several cameo appearances on local musicians' albums throughout the years. Callahan released her country album, Dry (2011) following a ten-year hiatus from music. Her most recent single, "Break My Heart Again" was released in 2013.

In 2012, Maria co-founded Molly Miller Band with drummer Charles Nelson, but disbanded it in 2013. Maria also performs with the all-female Merle Haggard Tribute Band, Gerle Haggard Band that she founded in April 2013.

== Doris Daze (1994–1999) ==
In 1993, Callahan joined with musicians Erin Moreland, Scott Crabtree and Eric Merrill to create Doris Daze, a Portland-based band that garnered much critical success and a devoted fan base.

The band's not-to-be-pigeonholed sound was referred by critics to everything from "poppy folk-rock" to "eclectic beyond belief," for their wide range of instrumentation and disregard for genre. Critic Scott D. Lewis commented that "the congenial quartet combines influences ranging from classic rock, upbeat country, progressive folk, hallucinatory psychedelia and standard pop to form music that, through proficient and consistently compelling, resists easy branding." Callahan is frequently cited as one of the group's strength's for both her voice and songwriting ability. Lewis further noted in his review for Perpetual Happiness Machine that "Doris Daze singer/guitarist Maria Callahan, who is also the band's chief songwriter, displays a durable aptitude for creating memorable, if quirky songs and the ability to color them with unusual guitar formations; singing them with a rich, evocative voice." The Oregonian stated that "Singer/songwriter Maria Callahan's strong voice makes Doris Daze one of Portland's best modern folk-rock bands."

Doris Daze played to increasingly packed houses as well as doing tour stints in Oregon penitentiaries and appeared more than once on the stages of NXNW music festival. Though the band continued to get regular play on both FM and college radio and had begun receiving interest by the record industry, the group decided to call it quits in 1999 following the release of "Perpetual Happiness Machine."

== Dry (2011) ==
After 10 years away from the studio, Callahan began working on a series of country songs in the winter of 2009. Teaming up once again with producer Danny O'Hanlon (Perpetual Happiness Machine) Dry is the first solo effort by Callahan. In addition to writing ten of the record's eleven songs, she provided the majority of the instrumentation and all of the vocals. The song Don't You Let Me Down was collaboratively written with Portland-area songwriters Rob Barteletti and Nick Peets.

Dry was released in September 2011. In an October 2011 review, music critic S.P. Clarke commented that, "Maria is a skilled musician...with Dry she stakes her claim on a barren stylistic landscape earning a hard-carved harvest." A music video for the album's closing song, He's Your Problem Now, directed by Mette Bach of Vancouver, BC, can be found on YouTube.
