= Juke Joint Gamblers =

American rock and roll band

The Juke Joint Gamblers are an American rock and roll band founded in Portland, Oregon in 2005. They became popular with 1950s and 1960s-style rock 'n' roll tracks, such as "Devils Cadillac" and "She Ain't Rockabilly".

Their music has been featured on Billetproof DVDs as well as in the hot rod documentary The Movie: The Way It Really Was. They have appeared on Guitbox, a popular public access television show in Portland.

== Discography ==
=== Albums ===
- Luck of The Draw - 2006
- Gas Money - 2007
- Hot Rods, Rock N' Roll, and The Devil - 2008
