= Brendan Faegre =

American drummer

- Born: 1985 (age 40–41); Portland, Oregon
- Genres: Contemporary classical, Experimental, Avant-garde
- Occupations: Composer, Drummer
- Instrument: Drummer
- Years active: 2008–present
- Website: www.brendanfaegre.com

Brendan Faegre (born 1985) is an American composer and drummer based in The Netherlands.

== Biography ==
Faegre was born and raised in Portland, Oregon, where his musical life began by playing drums in rock bands. He studied at the University of Puget Sound, Indiana University, the Norwegian Academy of Music, the Royal Conservatory of The Hague, and privately with Ramdas Palsule in India.

He writes music for many different contexts, such as an orchestral work at Carnegie Hall, a work for the 31-tone microtonal Fokker organ played by early music keyboardist Masato Suzuki, a work for dancers and percussionists in a bar, a semi-improvised work using samples of Lloyd Blankfein's voice, and a work for himself as drum kit and synthesizer soloist.

Faegre's music has been performed at many festivals around the world, such as November Music, Huddersfield Contemporary Music Festival, Aspen Music Festival and School, Cabrillo Festival of Contemporary Music, and Bang on a Can. Among Faegre's awards are the New York Youth Symphony First Music commission, Beijing Modern Music Festival Young Composer Award, TROMP Composition Competition, and a BMI Student Composer Award.

He founded two ensembles where he works as both composer and drummer: Bow Hammer Connection (a trio of violin, drum kit, and electronics) and the Edge Ensemble (a quintet of bass clarinet, baroque violin, piano, bass, drum kit). These ensembles were selected for showcase concerts in 2017 and 2018 respectively at the international music conference Classical:NEXT.

== Interviews ==
- Meet the Institute Composers: Brendan Faegre
