= Tyler Stenson =

American folk singer/songwriter

- Born: February 16, 1981 (age 45); Lander, Wyoming, U.S.
- Genres: Singer-Songwriter / Folk
- Years active: 1999-present
- Formerly of: Rhetoric Tuesday, Lander
- Website: www.tylerstenson.com

Tyler Stenson is a singer-songwriter of "Elegant Folk" music from Portland, Oregon. He was born in Lander, Wyoming in 1981 and raised in West Linn, Oregon. From 2000 to 2005, Stenson was the frontman and chief singer-songwriter for the pop-rock group Rhetoric Tuesday based in Eugene, Oregon. From 2005 to 2007, he acted as frontman for the Portland-based folk-rock band Lander. He has been a solo singer-songwriter since Lander dissolved in 2007.

Stenson was named "Songwriter of the Year" in 2007 and 2008 by the Portland Songwriters Association and "Best Male Artist" at the 2011 Portland Music Awards.

In early 2012, Chevrolet used two of Stenson's compositions within their national advertising campaigns; "The Road" was featured on a Chevy Silverado campaign and "We Grow" was featured on a Chevy Volt "Just the Facts" commercial.

On the national stage, Stenson was hand-picked by legendary producer Don Was as a Top 10 Finalist in Guitar Center’s “Search for the Next Great American Songwriter” in 2013. In 2014, Stenson was also selected by Adam Duritz (Counting Crows) and Ryan Spaulding to perform in their Outlaw Roadshow Showcases (SXSW + NYC).

Stenson was a singer-songwriter in Nashville, Tennessee for two years. While in Tennessee, Stenson recorded two studio albums (Long Before the Wheel and Another Gleam) which were performed at many of the city's songwriting venues and toured the Southern region of the United States.

Stenson has written and composed a total of 13 albums to date: Princess Willy LP (2000), The Low Ceiling EP (2002), Moose Lodge Sessions LP (2004), Orange Chrome Sky LP (2006), Lander Live at Mississippi Studios LP (2007), See That Gleam LP (2008), Bittersweet Parade LP (2010), Long Before the Wheel EP (2010), Another Gleam LP (2011), Some Days I'm a Lion LP (2012), Lovely Little Victory EP (2013), New Northbound LP (2017), In the Loudest Way EP (2019). His 2010 EP, Long Before the Wheel, and his 2017 LP, New Northbound, were both community-funded through a Kickstarter.

Stenson has opened for LeAnn Rimes, John Popper, Chris Isaak, George Ezra, Marc Cohn, Matisyahu, Allen Stone, Alpha Rev, LeRoy Bell from the American television series X Factor, and Justin Hopkins from the NBC television series The Voice.

Following the release of his "In the Loudest Way" EP in 2019, Stenson went on a musical hiatus (his social media platforms cite the COVID-19 pandemic, the birth of his second daughter, and a general re-evaluation of his relationship with music as the reasons why). Starting in early 2024, Stenson began performing again. He is set to release a new EP, tentatively titled "Be Kind to Me, Time," in 2025.
