= Josef Komarek =

US musical talent

Josef Patrick Komarek (born 1992) is an American composer, conductor, instrumentalist, and educator.

== Early life: 1992–2010 ==
Komarek was born to Joel Komarek and Mary Hoenig in the Portland, Oregon, area. Though not coming from a notably musical family, his interest in music was evident during his formative years. As a child, Komarek was involved with a variety of ensembles in the Portland metro area, including the Portland Boychoir, Ovation!, Satori Men's Chorus, Aurora Women's Chorus, and was also a member of the Tallis Scholars Summer School (USA) as an adolescent.

== Education and professional career: 2010–present ==
Following his secondary education at Woodrow Wilson High School, Komarek continued his studies in Oregon, receiving a B.A. in music composition at Linfield College in McMinnville, Oregon. While there, Komarek studied under Richard Bourassa and Jon Newton; he also became a member of the American Society of Composers, Authors, and Publishers (ASCAP).

Komarek’s works include orchestral, chamber, and choral works. He is known for incorporating elements of many different branches in the classical tradition, including minimalism, neoclassicism, and serialism. His music has been performed throughout Oregon at such places as the Oregon Bach Festival Composers Symposium and various Linfield College ensembles.

Also engaged in other facets of Classical music, Komarek was the Artistic Director of the Linfield Camerata, a select vocal ensemble specializing in the performance of early music, between 2011 and 2012. During the year 2011, Komarek was the host and producer of "Masterworks Hour," a program focusing on introducing audiences to the standard works of the Classical cannon on Linfield’s radio station, KSLC 90.3 FM.

== Personal life ==
As of April 2015, Komarek has not composed any new works, and has instead focused on continuing his education and becoming a teacher. He has not stated whether or not he has given up composing for good.

== List of compositions ==
Instrumental works

- Colors, for four instruments (2012)
- Pedal Music, for piano & optional vibraphone (2012)
- Portraits of Nature, for solo piano (2011–12)
- Black Key Suite, for solo piano (2012)
- Promenades for the Piano (2013)
- Wrong Clef, for string quartet (2013)
- A Cloudburst, for string quartet (2013)
- Suspended, for three horns (2013)
- Fanfare for an Uncertain Future, for trumpet trio & percussion (2013)
- Short & Suite, for string trio (2014)
- Air for a Newborn, for violin & piano (2014)

Choral and vocal works

- Dreams of a Tree (2009)
- Stillness (2010)
- Anima Christi (2011)
- The Bargain (2011)
- Tenebrae (2011)
- Verbum Caro (2012)
- Stabat Mater (2012)
- Two Christmas Songs (2012)
- Illumina faciem tuam (2012)
- Spem in alium (2012)
- The Lord’s Prayer (2013)
- Benedicta es (2013)
- A Little While, for baritone & piano (2014)
- Le Reveil (2014)
- Invictus (2014)
- Ad Virginem (2014)
- Flower Among Flowers (2015)
