= Bill Beach (jazz musician) =

American singer

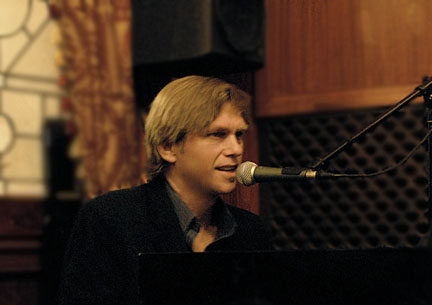

Background information
- Born: 1953 (age 72–73); Corvallis, Oregon, U.S.
- Genres: Jazz, bossa nova
- Occupations: Musician, composer
- Instrument: Piano
- Years active: 1970–present
- Label: Axial
- Website: billbeach.com

Bill Beach (born 1953) is a jazz pianist, vocalist, and teacher.

== Biography ==
In 2003, Beach began to study Brazilian music and the Portuguese language. He concentrated on the bossa nova introduced by Antonio Carlos Jobim, João Gilberto, Vinicius De Moraes, Carlos Lyra and João Donato and the later MPB styles of Sergio Mendez, Edu Lobo, Milton Nascimento, and Ivan Lins. He released Letting Go in 2004 on his Axial Records label. This album was his debut as leader of a recording session and featured Beach singing Brazilian standards and playing original instrumentals in a piano trio setting.

In 2008, Beach began writing lyrics in the Brazilian style, and his album Brasil Beat (2010) contained music and lyrics in Portuguese. This was followed by Búzios also original material and also on Axial Records. This album featured Rebecca Kilgore on vocals and Gary Hobbs on drums.

== Discography ==
- Letting Go (2004)
- Brasil Beat (2010)
- Búzios (2011)
