= Amparito Farrar =

American opera singer

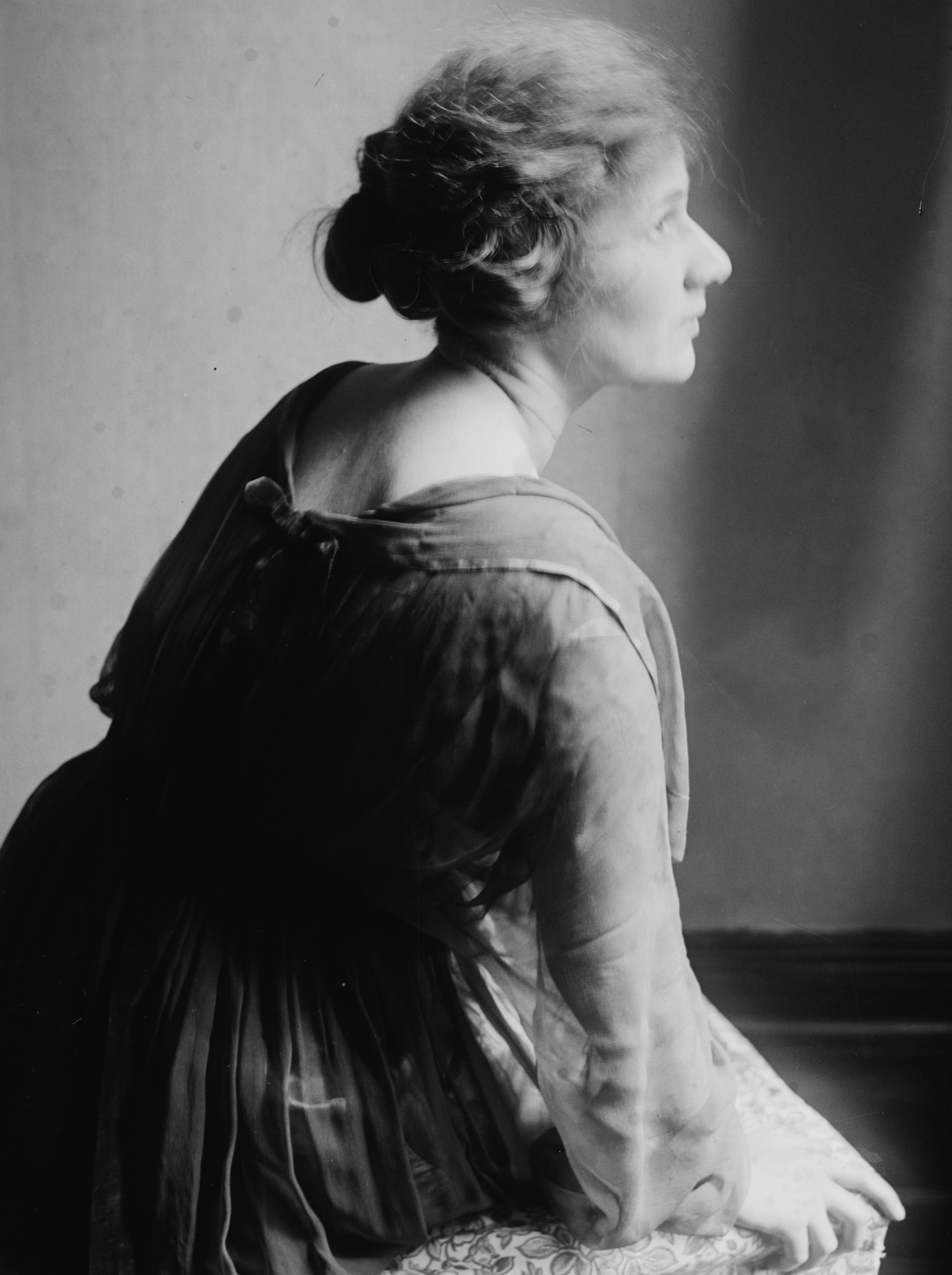
- Farrar in 1915
- Born: May 18, 1893; Portland, Oregon, U.S.
- Died: October 31, 1989 (aged 96); Winter Park, Florida, U.S.
- Occupation: Soprano concert singer
- Spouse: Goodrich Truman Smith (m. 1919)

Amparito Farrar (May 18, 1893 — October 31, 1989) was an American soprano concert singer who came to prominence after performing in France for the troops during World War I.

A native of Portland, Oregon, Farrar was the daughter of Spanish-American parents. She was raised in Portland and Sacramento, California, and began singing at a young age, accompanied by her musician mother. As an adolescent, Farrar traveled to Europe, where she studied music in Vienna, Paris, London, and Milan. While in Europe, she performed with the Vienna Opera, and appeared in a West End performance of Adele in 1914.

Farrar pursued a musical career in New York City, signing a recording contract with Columbia Records, before sailing to France with her mother in the summer of 1918 to entertain troops fighting in World War I. Upon returning to the United States following a five-month stint, Farrar married Goodrich Truman Smith, a soldier she had met while abroad, in Manhattan. She lived the remainder of her life there and in Florida, where she died in 1989, aged 96.

== Biography ==
=== Early life ===
Amparito Farrar was born May 18, 1893, in Portland, Oregon, (Note: Farrar's passport discloses her birthdate and birthplace.) and raised in Sacramento, California, the daughter of Louis C. Farrar and Guadalupe Farrar (née Biven). According to Farrar, she was the great-great-granddaughter of military officer Juan Bautista de Anza. Her paternal grandfather was a Civil War captain, and her father headed the men of Company G in Portland.

She studied music in Paris, London, Vienna, and Milan. In France, she was a pupil of Jean Périer of the Opéra-Comique. Through her studies in Europe, she became fluent in five languages, and performed at the Vienna Opera. While Farrar sang in multiple languages, she detested the notion that singing in English was unrefined, commenting:

The singing art of a country is largely influenced by the language and the speech—at least it is so in Europe, and should be in America. Some day it will be—when we overcome the absurd idea that singing in English is not as acceptable as in other languages. This is a fallacy that ought to be exploded, and will be if we get enough American and English artists to prove by a high artistic standard that our language is quite as beautiful as others."

=== Career ===
Farrar had her break in 1914 when she was promoted from the chorus to the starring role in High Jinks in New York. The same year, Farrar appeared in a West End production of Adele in London. In 1916, Farrar co-starred with Bradford Kirkbride in The Lilac Domino in Allentown, Pennsylvania. Farrar made her New York debut in 1917, in Treasure Trove, conducted by Walter Damrosch, and soon after had her recital debut at the Aeolian Hall in 1918. In July 1918, she signed a recording contract with Columbia Records.

During World War I, Farrar performed in France for five months at hospitals and canteens, under the auspices of the YMCA's Overseas Theatre League. Her mother went along as her accompanist on piano, and they sailed in on August 9, 1918. "I have sung in motor camps, huts, bakeries, hospitals, even at the bedsides of the boys, one at a time," she wrote, describing her efforts. She also encouraged fans to send recordings, sheet music, and musical instruments to veterans' hospitals and military camps. Upon her return, she gave concerts in various North American cities.

After returning to the United States, she continued her vocal training with American voice teacher Carl Breneman. In April 1919, Farrar was in a traffic accident as a passenger in a taxi in New York City, and required surgery to treat her facial injuries.

Farrar married Goodrich Truman Smith, a medical doctor she met overseas, on June 2, 1919, at the North Presbyterian Church in Manhattan. They lived together in New York City.

=== Later life ===
In her later years, Farrar relocated to Florida.

== Death ==
Farrar died in 1989, aged 96 years, in Winter Park, Florida.
