= The No-No's =

American indie pop band

The No-No's were an American indie pop band based in Portland, Oregon. The band formed in 1995 and released several albums and EPs into the early 2000s.

== Members ==
- Robin Bowser — vocals
- Mike Clark — guitar
- Ralf Youtz — bass
- Heather Dunn — drums
- Dan Heller — drums

== Discography ==
=== Singles & EPs ===
- New Species Anthem (Ross Records, 1997)
- Damage Done (Chromosome Records, 2000)

=== Albums ===
- Secret Luminaries (Chromosome Records, 1999)
- Tinnitus (Animal World Recordings, 2000)
- Let Your Shadow Out (Chromosome Records, 2002)
