= Griff Williams (musician) =

Griffith (Griff) Evan Williams (born May 16, 1908, La Grande, Oregon - died February 23, 1959, Chicago, IL) was an American dance bandleader and pianist.

Williams led a college band at Stanford University in the early 1930s and was a member of the Anson Weeks Orchestra in 1932. He earned a Bachelor of Arts degree from Stanford. Soon afterwards, he formed his own group in San Francisco, which included Buddy Moreno as a vocalist, and had its first major engagement at the supper club Edgewater Beach Hotel in October 1933. He toured throughout the United States in the 1930s before relocating to Chicago for another engagement at the Stevens Hotel, where he worked from 1939 through about 1944.

Williams recorded for Okeh, Varsity, and Columbia, and led his band full-time until 1953, when he began working for the trade magazine publisher Haywood. He still played occasional dates with the group in the middle of the decade, including on television, but in 1957 became vice president of Haywood, essentially ending his music career. He died of a heart attack in 1959.
