= Sallie Ford and the Sound Outside =

American rock band

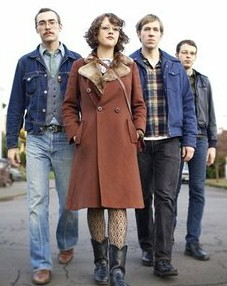
- Sallie Ford and the Sound Outside

Background information
- Origin: Portland, Oregon, USA
- Genre: Rock
- Years active: 2007-2013
- Label: Partisan Records
- Members: Sallie Ford; Ford Tennis; Tyler Tornfelt; Jeffrey Munger
- Website: www.sallieford.com

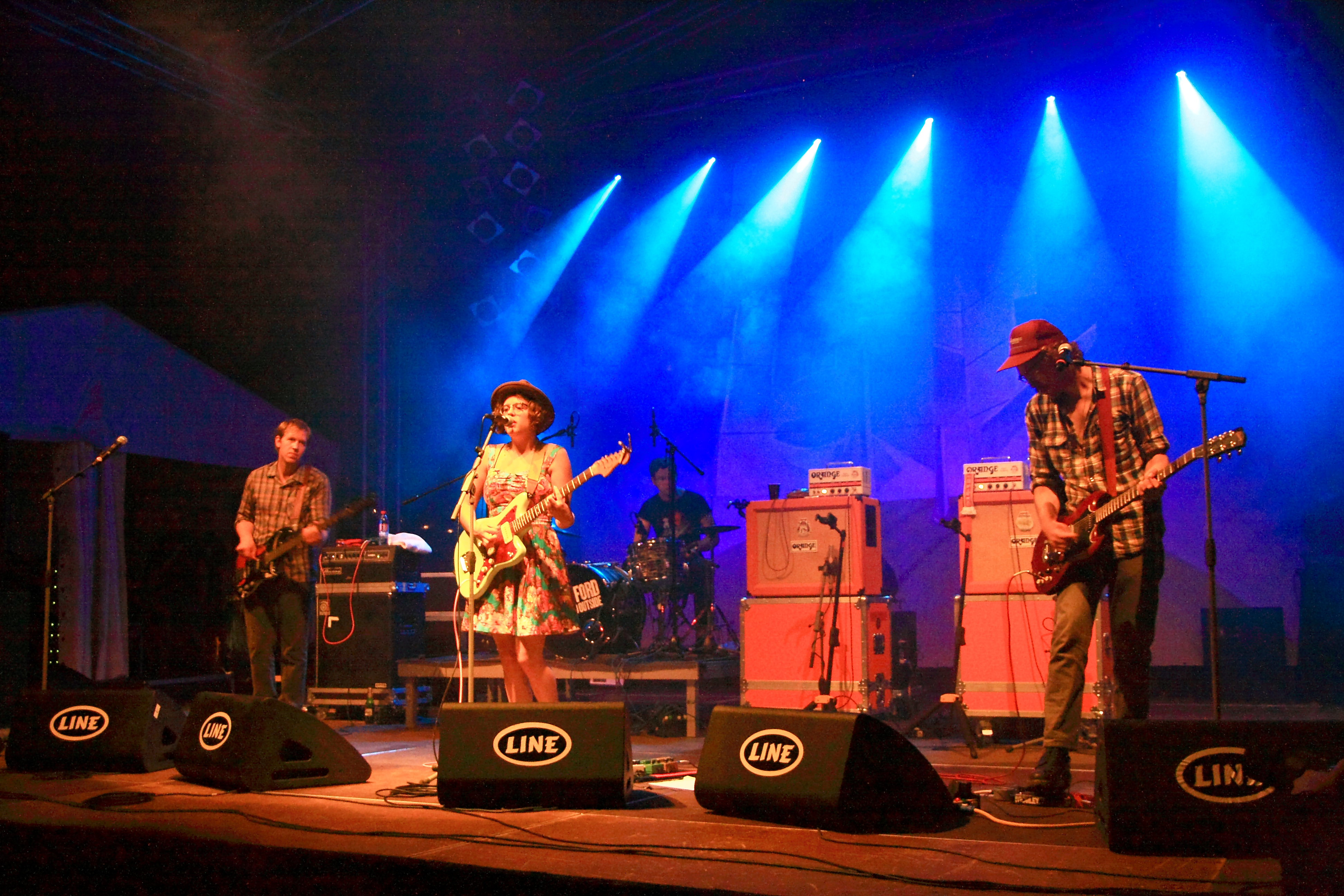
Sallie Ford and the Sound Outside at TFF Rudolstadt 2012

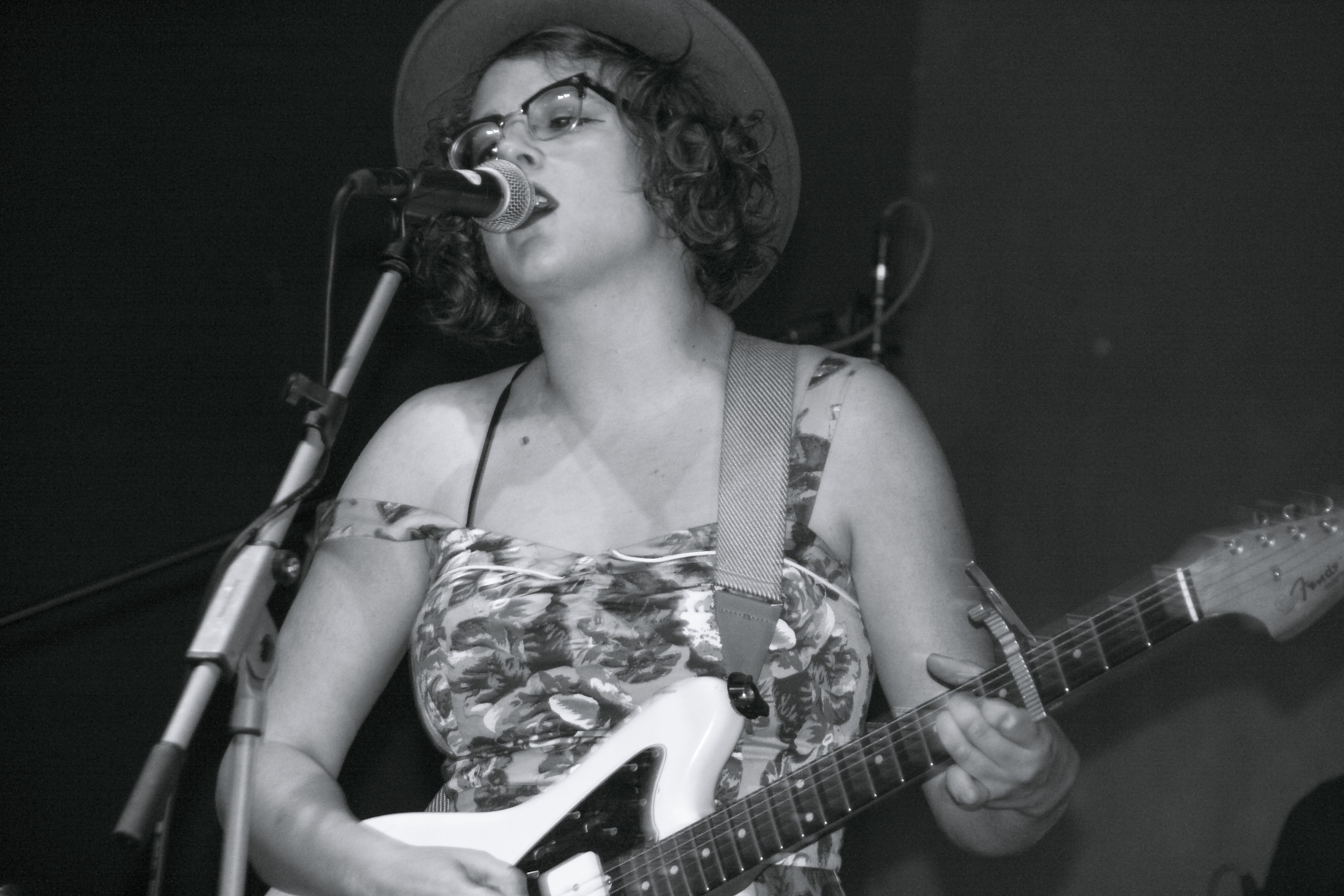
Sallie Ford

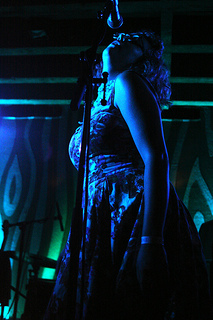
Sallie Ford and the Sound Outside at the Doug Fir Lounge, Portland, Oregon. Shot by Stephanie Neil

Sallie Ford and the Sound Outside was an American rock band from Portland, Oregon. The band has been described as "Rockabilly", or as having a "raw soul" 1950s rock-and-roll energy sound. Sallie Ford describes it as "Rock n Roll" and that people find it "more rockin’ than they expected." The group received positive reviews from USA Today's music critic Whitney Matheson and from The Oregonian critic Ryan White. In 2011, they signed a record deal with Partisan Records and released their first full-length CD Dirty Radio in May, began a US tour in June, and in August, performed on the Late Show with David Letterman.

Sallie Ford is the daughter of puppeteer Hobey Ford, and grew up in Asheville, North Carolina before moving to Oregon. In Portland, she worked as a waitress, and met Alaskan fisherman Tyler Tornfelt and Ford Tennis and Jeff Munger who were "scraping by". With Ford on vocals and guitar, Tennis on drums, Munger on guitar, and Tornfelt on upright bass, they had a band in 2007. They played local clubs in the Portland area.

According to singer Seth Avett of The Avett Brothers, Ford's songs have that "rare quality of somehow combining fun with emotional and artistic integrity" and she "fills the room with it" and reminds him of the "energy of early rock 'n' roll." The group opened for The Avett Brothers and recorded a five-song EP entitled Not an Animal. Ford's voice has been compared to Ella Fitzgerald, Tom Waits, Billie Holiday, with possible influences from Bessie Smith and Snoop Dogg, and used the words "two-step big beat gospel" to describe the effect. The group has toured the United States, including cities such as Seattle, and have appeared in Nashville. A reviewer for the Portland Mercury suggested that listeners should dress in 1950s style with a "trilby hat", and described the group as "energetic."

On December 17, 2013, the band announced that they would separate after 4 final shows. They closed things out with a pair of shows at the Doug Fir Lounge in Portland. As of March 2014, Ford had found a new backing band and was working on new material.

In 2026 the band reunited for a four show reunion tour.

== Discography ==
- Not an Animal
- Dirty Radio
- Untamed Beast
- Summer E.P.
