= Hillstomp =

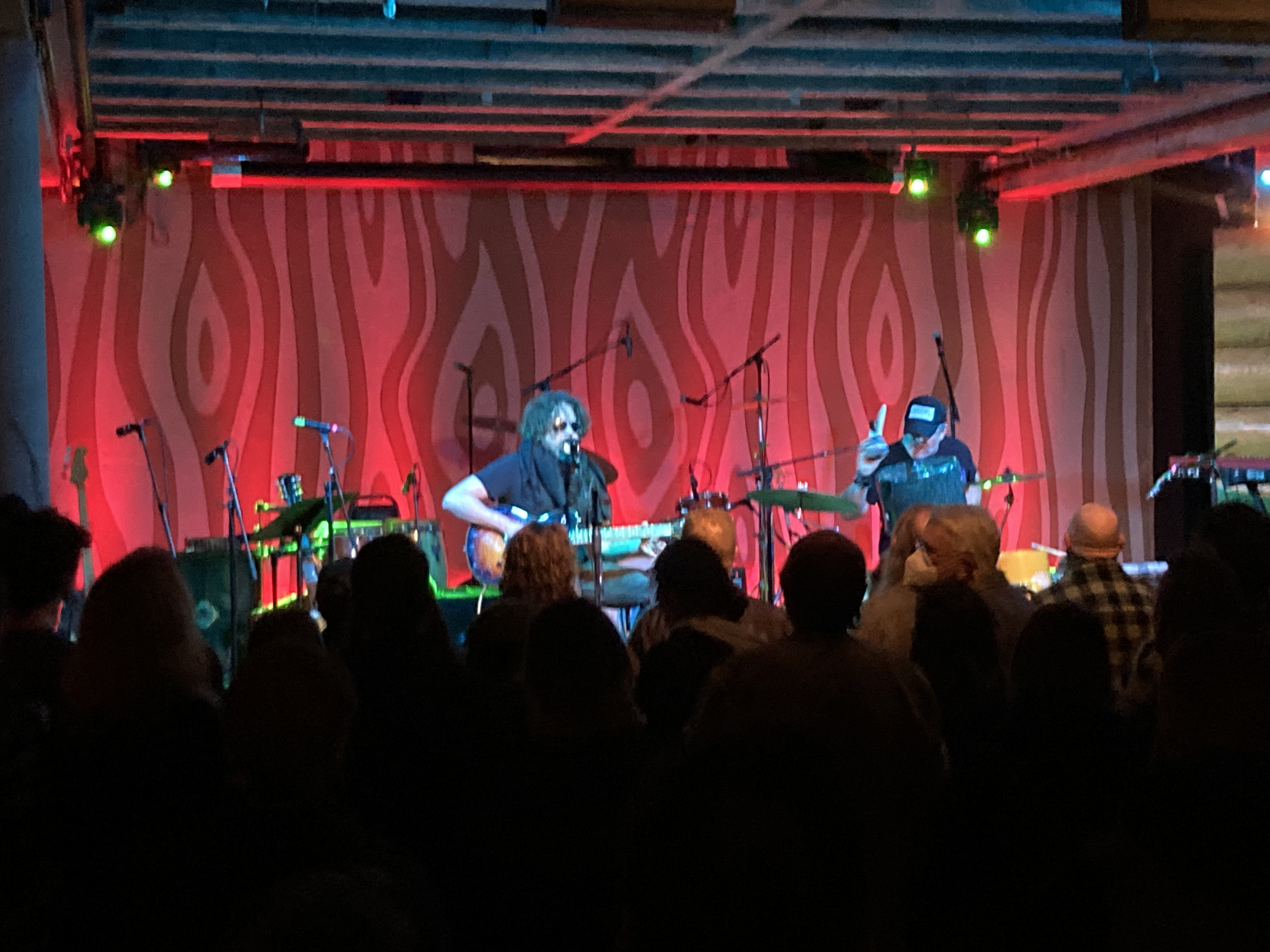
- Playing at the Doug Fir Lounge in 2022

Background information
- Origin: Portland, Oregon, United States
- Genres: Alternative country, Punk blues

Hillstomp is an American punk blues duo consisting of Henry Hill Kammerer and John "Lord Buckets" Johnson from Portland, Oregon, known for unique versions of traditional material and energetic live performances. They are also known for original material. Notable originals include "Northeast Portland 3AM", "Lucy's Lament" and "Graverobber's Blues". Hillstomp was featured in the third season of "Sons of Anarchy". Hillstomp has toured the US, and Europe since 2002.

In December 2005, their album The Woman that Ended the World was named Album of the Year by Portland alternative weekly Willamette Week.

Hillstomp credits R.L. Burnside as one of their biggest musical influences. They are considered to be forerunners in the modern two piece blues revival, along with the Black Keys, Doo Rag, and the White Stripes.

== Discography ==
- 2005: One Word
- 2005: The Woman That Ended the World
- 2007: After Two But Before Five
- 2010: Darker the Night
- 2014: Portland, Ore
- 2018: Monster Receiver
