= Enric Sifa =

- Born: Eric Nshimiyumuremyi; December 24, 1988 (age 37); Eastern Province, Rwanda
- Genres: Soul, Afropop, Dance-pop
- Occupations: Musician, entrepreneur
- Instrument: Guitar
- Years active: 2006–present
- Labels: MyiBOBO Entertainment
- Website: enricsifa.com

Eric Nshimiyumuremyi (born December 24, 1988), better known by his stage name Enric Sifa, is a Rwandan singer-songwriter and inspirational speaker. In 2002, he won a Rwandan singing competition that launched his music career and garnered him radio and television airtime in Rwanda. In 2006. a Portland, Oregon based non-profit organization working in Rwanda included him in a band that toured the United States to promote child sponsorship. After touring he remained in Portland and has since released three studio albums and an EP.

== Early life ==
Sifa was born on December 24, 1988, in a village in Eastern Province, Rwanda to a middle-class family. His father sold plastic industrial products, and his family owned a car and employed servants to tend their coffee plantation. When Sifa was five years old, his father and older brother were murdered in the Rwandan genocide. Sifa and his younger brother were separated from their mother and baby sister and avoided the violence by fleeing to the jungle where they remained for three months. After facing starvation in the jungle, Sifa decided to risk being murdered and reentered the village where he and his brother were reunited with their mother and sister at a Red Cross station. When they returned to their house, they discovered a corrupt official had seized their property, so they lived in a small hut for several years until Sifa's mother obtained the necessary papers from the Rwandan government to reclaim her property. When she approached the government official about her property, he hired a gang to beat her and she died two weeks later from the beatings.

Sifa's aunt took in his brother and sister but because she could not afford to support him as well, he began living with a neighbor. Living in the same village where his family had been murdered was emotionally difficult for Sifa, so he ran away and became a street orphan. For six years Sifa survived on the streets by singing for strangers on the streets for change, assisting merchants, carrying luggage, and gambling at marbles with other street kids.

Sifa continued to sing his mother's songs to comfort himself and other boys, and he valued music so highly that he would sneak into dance clubs although he was legally too young. One night after hopping a fence to gain access to a night club, the bouncers beat him, and Sifa felt he heard God instructing him to longer go to dance clubs. The next morning he went to a church and became a Christian.

He enjoyed the music at the church, and a church family let him stay in their home. A woman working with Africa New Life Ministries, a non-profit organization from Portland, Oregon, wanted to support him and gave him a guitar because she recognized his musical ability. In 2002, a year and a half after living on the streets, Sifa won a national singing-songwriting competition for a song he wrote titled "Love and AIDS." Sifa gained immediate celebrity in Rwanda over television and radio and was invited to play before President Paul Kagame.

== Music career ==
From 2006 to 2008, Sifa toured the United States with a band called Hindurwa, which was formed by Africa New Life Ministries to promote their child sponsorships. They primarily played traditional Rwandan music and dressed as intore dancers when drumming. After playing at Westside Christian High School in Lake Oswego, Oregon, Sifa accepted a scholarship to enroll in Westside Christian High School. In 2007, Sifa released his first solo album, Just a Moment, which included some of the songs he recorded with Hindurwa.

Many of Sifa's songs have a social justice theme, and he has been active in sharing his life story and performing at various fundraising galas for non-profits and at social justice conferences. International evangelist Andrew Palau invited Sifa to headline the Kigali Festival in Kigali, Rwanda which had a crowd of over 70,000 people on July 17–18, 2009. As part of the Art & Abolition series of anti-human trafficking events, Sifa performed and spoke at Stanford University on April 18, 2011. In 2011, Sifa filmed a music video for his song "Street Love" from his The Other Side of Me album and donated profits from Street Love T-shirts to organizations working in Africa, a practice he continues today with his merchandise sales. Sifa was also invited to speak and sing at Regent University School of Law's Center for Global Justice, Human Rights, and the Rule of Law symposium "Media and the Law: Seeking Justice for the Least of These" in March 2012.

In 2014, Sifa started his own record label, MyiBOBO LLC. After having vocal chords surgery which required that he not sing for five weeks, Sifa produced and recorded The Coronation Ceremony, which he released on October 27, 2014.

== Personal life ==
On August 9, 2014, Sifa married his wife Whitney Ferrin, whom he met at Warner Pacific College. In May 2015, Sifa graduated with a bachelor's degree in business from Warner Pacific and plans to create several interconnected businesses under MyiBOBO LLC to support his music career.

== Discography ==
=== With Hindurwa ===
- 2006 Changed to Change Others

=== Solo ===
- 2007 Just a Moment
- 2009 My Love EP
- 2010 The Other Side of Me
- 2014 The Coronation Ceremony

=== Covers ===
- 2013 Mad World

=== As featured artist ===
- 2008 Rock Rwanda Volume 1 (Compilation)
- 2010 Rwanda Rhythms (compilation)
- 2012 Christmas Duets (Michael Allen Harrison)
