= Surf Trio =

American surf rock band

- Surf Trio 1994

Background information
- Origin: Eugene, Oregon, US
- Genres: Surf rock
- Years active: 1984–1989, 1994–2000?
- Labels: Voxx, Moxie, September Gurls, BloodRed, Get Hip, Pin-Up, Star (Canada)
- Past members: Ron Kleim; Pete Weinberger; Dave Myers; Aaron Temple; Jeff Martin; Terrence Kerrigan; Tim Erickson; Chuck Thompson

The Surf Trio was a surf rock band that formed in Eugene, Oregon, in 1984.

== Lineup ==
Founding members included Ron Kleim on guitar and vocals, Pete Weinberger on guitar and vocals, Dave Meyers on bass, and Aaron Temple on drums. Dave Meyers was replaced by Jeff Martin shortly after the release of their first E.P. on Moxie records in 1985. Terrence Kerrigan, from the Bo Diddley Headhunters, replaced Aaron Temple in August 1988 and was with the band through June 1989, when he, Martin and Weinberger, Joel Barnett, founding member of the Miracle Workers and the Bo Diddley Headhunters, and Richard Spaugh from Drivetrain and previously Dimension 7, formed the Wicked Ones.

Tim Erickson and Chuck Thompson handled the drum duties at various times during the Surf Trio's reformation in the mid-to-late 1990s.

Steve Frothingham, Michael Miller, and Jayson Breeton also played drums and other instruments on various related projects, such as the ClockWatchers and the Electric Flies recordings.

== Style ==
The Surf Trio recorded and played mostly original material: instrumental surf, 60's garage, pop-punk, and Ramones-influenced punk rock. The band, along with the Miracle Workers and Dead Moon from Portland, Girl Trouble from Tacoma, and Mono Men from Bellingham, were a part of the Pacific Northwest's 60s-influenced, garage rock music scene during the mid-to-late 1980s.

== Releases ==
The group has a long list of releases on indie labels, including Voxx, Moxie Records, September Gurls, BloodRed Records and Discs, Get Hip, Pin-Up, and several others.

== Venues ==
Surf Trio played famous Northwest clubs like Satyricon, The Blue Gallery, Pine Street Theatre, Starry Night, The Off-Ramp, W.O.W. Hall, with dozens of gigs in Bellingham, Seattle, Portland, Salem, and Eugene. The band shared the stage with such groups as Stray Cats, the Young Fresh Fellows, and Lyres. Surf Trio toured Germany in 1994 and 1997. The band played three California gigs: one in L.A. at Greg Shaw's "Cavern Club" while recording their Voxx L.P. Almost Summer, and two shows at The Purple Onion in San Francisco.

The band continued to play Northwest clubs and recorded their final L.P., Forbidden Sounds, in 1999.

== Interregnum ==
Aaron Temple left the band in 1988, and now lives in Eugene, Oregon, with his wife and daughter. Members of the band, after 1989, went on to perform in groups such as Marble Orchard, the Wicked Ones, the Peppermint Gearshift, A Few Chairs, and the Romaines before the band reformed in 1994. In 1990, after corresponding with Rudi Protrudi and departing the Wicked Ones, Terrence Kerrigan auditioned for the drum spot with a Los Angeles incarnation of the Fuzztones.

=== Discography ===
- The Surf Trio - 7-inch EP, Moxie Records, 1985
- Almost Summer - LP, Voxx Records, 1986
- Safari in a Living Graveyard - LP, Moxie Records, 1989
- "Strychnine" track on Here AIN'T The Sonics-Tribute Album - LP, Estrus/PopLlama, 1989
- Safari in a Living Graveyard - LP, Star Records (Canada) 1989; reissued on CD, Blood Red Vinyl & Discs, 1996.
- The Surf Trio Unreleased - Moxie Records, 1991
- The Surf Trio - Compilation, September Gurls Records, 1992
- Surf Trio/Marble Orchard/Wicked Ones Double 7-inch - September Gurls Records, 1993
- Shook Outta Shape - LP/CD, September Gurls Records, 1994
- Steamer/Another Girl, Another Planet - 7-inch, Pin-Up Records, 1994
- Locked Into Surf Vol. 2" comp- LP/CD, Alopecia Records, 1994
- Curse of the Surf Trio - LP/CD, Pin-Up Records, 1995
- Hang 10/Mile Zero - 7-inch Blood Red Vinyl, 1995
- King of Cool/Salt Bath - 7-inch, Roto Records, 1996
- Splitsville split CD with Psychotic Youth -Wolverine/Pin-Up Records, 1996
- Surf Trio/Boss Martians split 7-inch, Blood Red Vinyl, 1998
- "Back to My Cave" track on Blood Red Battle Royal comp Blood Red Vinyl LP/CD, 1998
- "Forbidden Sounds" - LP/CD, Dionysus Records/Blood Red Vinyl, 1999
- "Wildcat" track on "Takin' out the Trash: A Tribute to the Trashmen" comp, Double Crown Records, 1999
