= PDX Pop Now! =

American annual music festival

- PDX Pop Now! vol. 7 compilation art by Carson Ellis, 2010
- Genre: Rock, Rap, Punk rock, Folk, Experimental, Indie
- Dates: Mid-summer
- Location: Portland, Oregon
- Years active: 2004–2019, 2021––
- Website: http://www.pdxpopnow.com

PDX Pop Now! is a local annual music festival held in Portland, Oregon, and a 100% volunteer-run registered 501(c)(3) non-profit organization that organizes and promotes the festival event. It consists of a two-disc compilation released in spring; a multi-day, free, all-ages music festival in the summer; and school and community outreach programs throughout the year. The organization and the event are dedicated to "celebrating, promoting, and enhancing Portland’s vital and diverse music community." The festival was first held in 2004, and has occurred every year since that time.

== History ==
PDX Pop Now! originated from a discussion on PDX Pop, Portland Indiepop Mailing list, a long running listserv for Portland musicians, fans, and writers interested in discussing the local music scene. On Jan 15th, 2004 Kell Dockham started a question about the sense of true unity in Portland music scene which ignited and inspired PDX Pop list members to organize a festival to celebrate local music. After two initial meetings, on Feb 3rd, 2004, Joshua Kirby sent out a meeting note to the PDX Pop list and pronounced the working title "PDX Pop Now", and thus a festival was born. This is how one e-email became a music festival.

== See also ==
- Culture of Portland, Oregon
- List of festivals in the United States
  - List of music festivals in the United States
