= A House, A Home =

- Directed by: Daniel Fickle
- Screenplay by: Mark Smith; Daniel Fickle
- Based on: "A House, A Home" by Adam Shearer; Adam Selzer
- Produced by: Mark Smith; James Strayer; Courtney Eck
- Starring: Meredith Adelaide; Calvin Morie McCarthy
- Cinematography: Reijean Heringlake
- Edited by: Daniel Fickle; Joe Forsythe
- Music by: Alialujah Choir
- Production companies: Two Penguins Productions; Four Winters
- Release date: March 9, 2012
- Running time: 7 minutes
- Country: United States
- Language: English

A House, A Home is a 2012 American short film/narrative music video scored by Alialujah Choir and features Portland Cello Project. Based on the song of the same name by Adam Shearer and Adam Selzer, the film adaptation was directed by Daniel Fickle, produced by Mark Smith, and written by Daniel Fickle and Mark Smith. Starring Meredith Adelaide and Calvin Morie McCarthy the film begins at the last lines of the song "A House, A Home": "You die knowing he'll bury you / Next to your love in the ground..." and tells a story of how a love, a death and another death are reconciled in a subterranean world.

In addition to being an official selection at the Raindance, Fantastic Fest and Mill Valley film festivals, A House, A Home was nominated for numerous awards ultimately winning thirty-two accolades including Best Short Film at the 32nd New Jersey Film Festival and Best of Festival at the 55th Rochester International Film Festival. A House, A Home was selected as an Official Honoree in The 17th Annual Webby Awards in the Music category.

== Synopsis ==
Under the care of Dr. James C. Hawthorne, fictional characters Partrick Brennan (1896–1914) and Sophia Mendenhall (1898–1921) share their temporal lives attracted to each other but are unable to a foster a relationship because of the confines of Dr. Hawthorne's mental institution. Patrick becomes convinced that Dr. Hawthorne is romantically involved with Sophia, a false reality that leaves him distraught and prompts him to take his life.

18-year-old Patrick (Calvin Morie McCarthy) lives an after-life in a small room continuously sketching the same object and exploring a tunnel system behind one of the walls. Seven years have passed since he was buried by his guardian Dr. Hawthorne. The year is 1921, and the arrival of a neighbor is a redemptive blessing for Patrick.

Patrick peers through a keyhole and sees Sophia (Meredith Adelaide), now five years his senior. Discovering a passageway he crawls through a narrow tunnel and arrives at her door. Their reunion is awkward for Patrick. Their roles have been reversed, her life experiences eclipse his. The inhibitions of adolescence are in Sophia's past, but being far from the world they once inhabited the relative aspects of experience no longer matter.

== Origin ==
In 2008, Kate Sokoloff produced a benefit album titled Dearly Departed. Sokoloff recruited singer-songwriters who had appeared on her OPB broadcast show Live Wire! Radio and asked each artist to write a song about a person buried at Portland's oldest cemetery. Along with Al James, Storm Large, Jesse Emerson, Matt Sheehy, Richie Young and others, Adam Shearer was asked to contribute to the 15-track compilation.

Shearer chose to write about Dr. James C. Hawthorne, a humanist and physician who founded the original Oregon State Hospital for the Insane. During the songwriting process, Shearer asked Adam Selzer of Norfolk & Western and M. Ward to collaborate on the arrangement. After completing "A House, A Home", Shearer and Selzer were inspired to continue writing and recording. They invited Alia Farah to join them and the band Alialujah Choir was formed.

In 2011, Shearer asked filmmaker Mark Smith to travel with his band Weinland to SXSW. On that trip Shearer shared the masters from Alialujah Choir's recording sessions. Smith became enamored with the song "A House, A Home". On his return to Portland, he decided to create a video that would begin at the last lines of the song: "You die knowing he'll bury you / Next to your love in the ground..." Smith contacted director Daniel Fickle and asked him to collaborate on the film.

== Pre-production ==
To create an underground environment a series of sets were constructed from June 2011 to December 2011. The sets were constructed for the camera. Every wall and the ceilings of Sophia's and Patrick's rooms were removable. The floors were affixed with castor wheels allowing the rooms to rotate 360 degrees.

== Filming ==
Principal photography took place in December 2011. Other than the reveal at the end of the film which was shot at Lone Fir Cemetery the production took place on a farm in Yamhill County, Oregon where the sets were built. The film was shot using a Sony FX 100 and Zeiss Compact Primes.

=== Awards ===
year	Film Festival	Country	Category	Result
2012	United Kingdom Film Festival	United Kingdom	Best Short	Won
2012	Poppy Jasper International Short Film Festival	United States	Best Drama	Won
2012	Short Sharp Festival	Australia	Best Score	Won
2012	Philadelphia Film & Animation Festival	United States	Best Music Video	Won
2012	Flatland Film Festival	United States	Audience Choice Award	Won
2012	Nevada Film Festival	United States	Platinum Reel Award	Won
2012	Interrobang Film Festival	United States	Best Free Form Film	Won
2012	International Film Festival Antigua Barbuda	Antigua and Barbuda	Best Music Video	Won
2012	Columbia Gorge International Film Festival	United States	Best Music Video	Won
2012	Lucerne International Film Festival	Switzerland	Platinum Reel Award	Won
2012	Silicon Valley Film Festival	United States	Best Music Video	Won
2012	International Film Festival of Cinematic Arts	United States	Best Editing	Won
2012	Oregon Film Awards	United States	Best Short Film	Won
2012	Accolade Competition	United States	Art Direction	Won
2012	Rumschpringe International Short Film Festival	United States	Best Music Video	Won
2012	One Cloudfest	Sweden	Best Music Video	Won
2012	One Cloudfest	Sweden	Best Cinematography	Won
2012	One Cloudfest	Sweden	OCF FAV	Won
2013	Macon Film Festival	United States	Best Music Video	Won
2013	Canada International Film Festival	Canada	Rising Star Award	Won
2013	Knickerbocker Film Festival	United States	Best Story	Won
2013	Geneva Film Festival	United States	Best Narrative Short	Won
2013	Charleston International Film Festival	United States	Best Film	Won
2013	Honolulu Film Awards	United States	Aloha Accolade	Won
2013	New Jersey Film Festival	United States	Best Short Film	Won
2013	First Glance Film Festival Hollywood	United States	Best Director	Won
2013	First Glance Film Festival Hollywood	United States	Audience Favorite	Won
2013	First Glance Film Festival Philadelphia	United States	Best Music Video	Won
2013	Portland Music Video Festival	United States	Silver Reel Award	Won
2013	Indie Gathering	United States	Best Music Video	Won
2013	Rochester International Film Festival	United States	Shoestring Trophy	Won
2013	Rochester International Film Festival	United States	Best of Festival	Won

=== Nominations and Official Selections ===
Nominations and Official Selections
Year	Film Festival	Country
2012	Raindance Film Festival	England
2012	Woodstock Film Festival	United States
2012	New Orleans Film Festival	United States
2012	San Diego Film Festival	United States
2012	VisionFest	United States
2012	Cornwall Film Festival	England
2012	Park City Music Film Festival	United States
2012	Budapest Short Film Festival	Hungary
2012	Take Two Film Festival	United States
2012	New York City International Film Festival	United States
2012	Artfest Film Festival	United States
2012	Tucson Film & Music Festival	United States
2012	Zero Film Festival	England
2012	Sacramento Film and Music Festival	United States
2012	United Film Festival	United States
2012	Great Lakes International Film Festival	United States
2012	Cincinnati Film Festival	United States
2013	Beloit International Film Festival	United States
2013	Trail Dance Film Festival	United States
2013	Sedona International Film Festival	United States
2013	San Antonio Film Festival	United States
2013	White Sands International Film Festival	United States
2013	Action/Cut International Short Film Festival	United States
2013	Action On Film International Film Festival	United States
2013	Balinale International Film Festival	Indonesia
2013	Maverick Movie Awards	United States
2013	Fantastic Fest	United States
2013	Mill Valley Film Festival	United States
2013	Aesthetica Short Film Festival	England
2013	Pop Montreal	Canada
2013	Columbus International Film & Video Festival	United States
2013	Bahamas International Film Festival	United States
2014	Sonoma International Film Festival	United States

== Additional appearances ==
- MTV Canada
- NME
- Current TV
- First Post
- IndieWire
- VH1
- Country Music Television
