= Alialujah Choir =

American folk band

- Origin: Portland, Oregon
- Genres: Indie rock, folk rock, funeral folk, art rock, alternative rock, alt-country, progressive rock
- Years active: 2012–present
- Labels: Jealous Butcher Records
- Members: John Adam Weinland Shearer; Alia Farah; Adam Selzer; Meredith Adelaide
- Website: www.alialujah.com

Alialujah Choir (ə-lee-ə-loo-yə kwy-ər) is an American folk band based in Portland, Oregon. The band consists of Adam Shearer, Alia Farah (Weinland) and Adam Selzer (Norfolk & Western). The trio is known for their sparse instrumentation, three part harmonies and balanced vocals. The band's inception is tied to the 19th century humanitarian James C. Hawthorne.

== Origin ==
In 2008 Adam Shearer was approached by Kate Sokoloff (Live Wire! Radio/OPB) to contribute a song for a benefit album titled Dearly Departed. Along with Al James, Storm Large, Jesse Emerson, Matt Sheehy, Richie Young and other Pacific Northwest singer songwriters, Adam Shearer was asked to compose a song about someone buried at Lone Fir, Portland, Oregon's oldest cemetery. Shearer chose to write about James C. Hawthorne, a humanitarian and physician who founded the original Oregon Hospital for the Insane. During the song writing process Shearer collaborated with Adam Selzer on the arrangement. After completing A House, A Home, Shearer and Selzer were inspired to continue writing and recording. Recognizing that piano and a third voice would benefit the music they invited Alia Farah to join them. Receiving the invitation in a 1 am text message Farah responded in jest that she would join Shearer and Selzer if they named the band Alialujah Choir.

Newspaper and magazine articles about the band have noted that in the beginning Alialujah Choir acted as a means for Shearer, Selzer and Farah to escape the commercial pressures of their other bands and return to their love for roots folk music. Prior to becoming a band, Shearer, Selzer and Farah drafted a set of rules in an effort to protect their songwriting and recording process from being compromised by extraneous variables connected to the music industry. Music editors have cited that the rules Alialujah Choir put in place for themselves has influenced their music in a positive way.

== Debut album ==
Alialujah Choir's self-titled debut, was recorded over the course of two years at Type Foundry Studio in Portland, Oregon, and was released by Jealous Butcher Records in February 2012. Shearer, Selzer and Farah recorded the album with self-imposed restrictions.

To begin, no one else could play on the album, or even be present in the studio while the tape was rolling. "We both learned how to run the boards and set up the mics so that Adam [Selzer, who helms Type Foundry Studio, where the group's self-titled debut was recorded] could record his parts," says Farah. Also, there would be no drum kit or bass found in the live room; all percussion had to be relegated to auxiliary status. "We were good about sticking to our many limitations," says Shearer. "And we knew it was because we wanted to preserve the good thing that we had."

In support of their album, after playing a CD release show at the Doug Fir in March 2012, Alialujah Choir toured with Pokey LaFarge and later with Portland Cello Project. Alialujah Choir's debut received positive reviews from The Oregonian, NPR, Willamette Week and other established publications. Many of the reviews focused on the chemistry between the band members noting the unity of the group and parallel vocals. In their review of the album The Portland Mercury noted the band's chemistry and sound as, "The musical connection that permeates the trio is something that exists far beyond anyone's command...every third line finds Shearer, Selzer, and Farah singing together in bone-chilling, otherworldly attunement."

Along with being responsible for Alialujah Choir's formation, the song A House, A Home influenced the completion of their first album. In 2010 Adam Shearer shared the masters of Alialujah Choir's recordings with filmmaker Mark Smith. The Oregonian and other reviews state that Smith became enamored with A House, A Home and decided to create a video that would begin at the last lines of the song. The anticipated release of the video became a caytalst for the band to complete their debut album. The song A House, A Home also appeared in the final 2012 episode of the television show Being Human

== A House, a Home (film) ==
Theatrical poster

A House, a Home is a 2012 American short film/narrative music video scored by Alialujah Choir and features Portland Cello Project. Based on the song of the same name by Adam Shearer and Adam Selzer, the film adaptation was produced by Mark Smith, directed by Daniel Fickle and written by Daniel Fickle and Mark Smith. Starring Meredith Adelaide and Calvin Morie McCarthy the film begins at the last lines of the song A House, A Home: You die knowing he'll bury you / Next to your love in the ground... and tells a story of how a love, a death and another death are reconciled in a subterranean world.

In addition to being an official selection at the Raindance, Fantastic Fest and Mill Valley film festivals, A House, A Home was nominated for numerous awards ultimately winning thirty-two accolades including Best Short Film at the 32nd New Jersey Film Festival and Best of Festival at the 55th Rochester International Film Festival. A House, A Home was selected as an Official Honoree in The 17th Annual Webby Awards in the Music category.

=== Awards ===
year	Film Festival	Country	Category	Result
2012	United Kingdom Film Festival	United Kingdom	Best Short	Won
2012	Poppy Jasper International Short Film Festival	United States	Best Drama	Won
2012	Short Sharp Festival	Australia	Best Score	Won
2012	Philadelphia Film & Animation Festival	United States	Best Music Video	Won
2012	Flatland Film Festival	United States	Audience Choice Award	Won
2012	Nevada Film Festival	United States	Platinum Reel Award	Won
2012	Interrobang Film Festival	United States	Best Free Form Film	Won
2012	International Film Festival Antigua Barbuda	Antigua and Barbuda	Best Music Video	Won
2012	Columbia Gorge International Film Festival	United States	Best Music Video	Won
2012	Lucerne International Film Festival	Switzerland	Platinum Reel Award	Won
2012	Silicon Valley Film Festival	United States	Best Music Video	Won
2012	International Film Festival of Cinematic Arts	United States	Best Editing	Won
2012	Oregon Film Awards	United States	Best Short Film	Won
2012	Accolade Competition	United States	Art Direction	Won
2012	Rumschpringe International Short Film Festival	United States	Best Music Video	Won
2012	One Cloudfest	Sweden	Best Music Video	Won
2012	One Cloudfest	Sweden	Best Cinematography	Won
2012	One Cloudfest	Sweden	OCF FAV	Won
2013	Macon Film Festival	United States	Best Music Video	Won
2013	Canada International Film Festival	Canada	Rising Star Award	Won
2013	Knickerbocker Film Festival	United States	Best Story	Won
2013	Geneva Film Festival	United States	Best Narrative Short	Won
2013	Charleston International Film Festival	United States	Best Film	Won
2013	Honolulu Film Awards	United States	Aloha Accolade	Won
2013	New Jersey Film Festival	United States	Best Short Film	Won
2013	First Glance Film Festival Hollywood	United States	Best Director	Won
2013	First Glance Film Festival Hollywood	United States	Audience Favorite	Won
2013	First Glance Film Festival Philadelphia	United States	Best Music Video	Won
2013	Portland Music Video Festival	United States	Silver Reel Award	Won
2013	Indie Gathering	United States	Best Music Video	Won
2013	Rochester International Film Festival	United States	Shoestring Trophy	Won
2013	Rochester International Film Festival	United States	Best of Festival	Won

=== Nominations and official selections ===
Nominations and Official Selections
Year	Film Festival	Country
2012	Raindance Film Festival	England
2012	Woodstock Film Festival	United States
2012	New Orleans Film Festival	United States
2012	San Diego Film Festival	United States
2012	VisionFest	United States
2012	Cornwall Film Festival	England
2012	Park City Music Film Festival	United States
2012	Budapest Short Film Festival	Hungary
2012	Take Two Film Festival	United States
2012	New York City International Film Festival	United States
2012	Artfest Film Festival	United States
2012	Tucson Film & Music Festival	United States
2012	Zero Film Festival	England
2012	Sacramento Film and Music Festival	United States
2012	United Film Festival	United States
2012	Great Lakes International Film Festival	United States
2012	Cincinnati Film Festival	United States
2013	Beloit International Film Festival	United States
2013	Trail Dance Film Festival	United States
2013	Sedona International Film Festival	United States
2013	San Antonio Film Festival	United States
2013	White Sands International Film Festival	United States
2013	Action/Cut International Short Film Festival	United States
2013	Action On Film International Film Festival	United States
2013	Balinale International Film Festival	Indonesia
2013	Maverick Movie Awards	United States
2013	Fantastic Fest	United States
2013	Mill Valley Film Festival	United States
2013	Aesthetica Short Film Festival	England
2013	Pop Montreal	Canada
2013	Columbus International Film & Video Festival	United States
2013	Bahamas International Film Festival	United States
2014	Sonoma International Film Festival	United States

== Additional appearances ==
- MTV Canada
- NME
- Current TV
- First Post
- IndieWire
- VH1
- Country Music Television

== Discography ==
=== Albums ===
Year	Title	Record label	Ref.
2012	The Alialujah Choir	Alialujah Choir	
2015	Big Picture Show	Alialujah Choir	

=== Live albums ===
Year	Title	Record label	Ref.
2016	Live from the Banana Stand	Banana Stand Media	

=== EPs & Singles ===
Year	Title	Record label	Ref.
2012	A House, A Home	Alialujah Choir	
2016	Yoshimi Battles the Pink Robots	Alialujah Choir	
