= Daniel Fickle =

American film director

- Born: Daniel McClellan Fickle Jr.
- Occupations: Photographer, Film director, music composer
- Years active: 2002–present

Daniel Fickle is a film director, photographer, cinematographer, music composer, and the founder of Two Penguins Productions.

== Early ==
Fickle grew up in and around the Decatur/Atlanta areas of Georgia, displaying and early interest in photography and music amidst the burgeoning 1990s Atlanta hardcore and hip hop scenes. By 2001 he was living in New York City, attending the New York Film Academy, where he first became a teacher's assistant and eventually an instructor, all while working freelance across the city as either an assistant camera, director of photography or music composer for film projects. After film school, Daniel took his skillset across the country to California, where he started Two Penguins Productions.

== Film and video ==
Fickle's directorial debut was a music video for Weinland's, I'm Sure it Helps. He then directed another music video, the Portland Cello Project's Denmark which was televised in France and featured on Vimeo, Motionographer, and Daily Motion. "Denmark" was officially selected in numerous film festivals, such as SXSW, receiving best film festival wins. In March 2011, the Foo Fighters chose Daniel for their "This Video Sucks" promotional campaign to direct a video for I Should Have Known, a single from their album Wasting Light. The video premiered on the Fuse TV network for a Wasting Light promo special hosted by Dave Grohl. GQ Rules, a men's fashion tip series directed by Daniel Fickle, was nominated as an Official Honoree for Best Web Personality/Host (hosts: Michael Hainey and Jim Moore of GQ) for the 2012 16th Annual Webby Awards. In 2012 Daniel directed Alialujah Choir's narrative music video A House, A Home. The film went on to win eighteen accolades including Best Short Film at the United Kingdom Film Festival and New Jersey Film Festival.

== Music ==
Prior to film making Daniel focused on music, particularly song-writing. His affinity for the latter placed him in prominent groups including the Atlanta-based band, Portrait and the New York City based band, the Station Myth. In 2015, the Station Myth regrouped under a new name, DANIELS, featuring all four original members for the first time in almost a decade. The name change was a fresh start for the band, and a nod to the fact that all four members of the band just happened to be named Daniel by birth, a wholly unintentional factor when grouping but one they always found spectacular. The resulting May 2015 studio album End Then Repeat is a brooding foray into electronic and shoegaze territory, carried by the hypnotic vocals of singer Daniel Ryan, who works in hypnosis therapy by trade, specializing in past life regression. In addition to playing in bands, Fickle has composed music for award-winning films and commercials. Daniel plays several instruments including guitar, bass, piano, drums, mandolin and ukulele.

== Two Penguins Productions ==
In 2007, Daniel Fickle founded Two Penguins Productions. Two Penguins is headquartered in Portland, Oregon. Some of their clients have included GQ, The New York Times, J.Crew, Keen Footwear, Nike, BlackBook, Gilt Groupe, Microsoft, Stoli vodka and Time magazine. The multi-media production company produces music videos, commercials (both web and broadcast), narrative films and documentaries.

== Nordstrom ==
In 2016, Fickle became the new senior video art director for Nordstrom at their Seattle headquarters.

== Filmography ==
=== Music videos ===
- A House a Home - Alialujah Choir (2012)
- I Should Have Known – Foo Fighters (2011)
- Hardliners – Holcombe Waller (2011)
- Denmark – Portland Cello Project (2010)
- I'm Sure it Helps – Weinland (2009)

=== Commercial/web ===
- GQ - GQ Rules series - 2010-2012
- Banana Republic - Escape in Linen
- Gilt Groupe - Gilt Mother's Day
- Widmer Brothers Brewery – Musical Brrr
- Widmer Brothers Brewery – Prost
- Widmer Brothers Brewery – Office Party

=== Short films ===
- A Night at the Cleaners - animated short
- Catching Up with Pily - addendum short to Denmark
- GQ Gentleman's Fund - PSA

=== Music composer ===
- This Revolution
- A Lawyer Walks into a Bar
- Miracle Ball
- The Battle of Local 5668
- Jacob (short film)

== Awards ==
- 2012 Webby Awards Official Honoree for GQ Rules. Best Personality/Host for Michael Hainey and Jim Moore.
- 2011 Gold Medal for Excellence for Music in a Short Film. Denmark.
- 2010 Best Music Video. Denmark.
- 2010 Royal Reel Award. Denmark.
- 2010 Best Documentary. Miracle Ball. Scored by Daniel Fickle.
- 2007 Best Narrative Feature. A Lawyer Walks into a Bar. Scored by Daniel Fickle.
