= Caroline Green =

American ice dancer (born 2003)

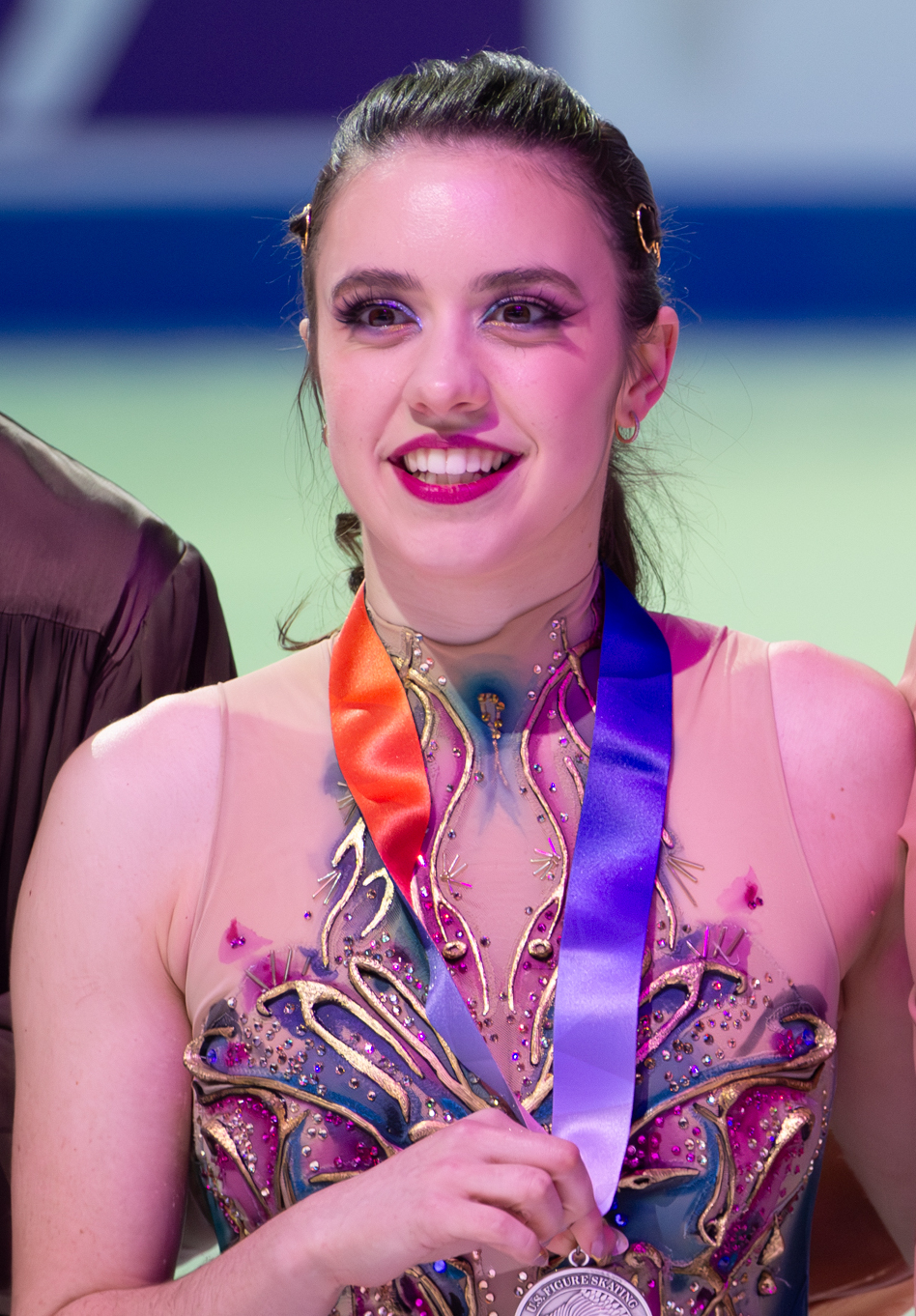
- Caroline Green during the medal ceremony at the 2026 U.S. Championships

Personal information
- Born: October 3, 2003 (age 23) Washington, D.C., U.S.
- Home town: Rockville, Maryland, U.S.
- Height: 5 ft 3 in (1.60 m)

Figure skating career
- Country: United States
- Discipline: Ice dance
- Partner: Michael Parsons (since 2019); Gordon Green (2009–19)
- Coach: Charlie White; Tanith White; Greg Zuerlein
- Skating club: Pavilion SC Cleveland Heights
- Began skating: 2009

Medal record
Four Continents Championships
Gold medal – first place	2022 Tallinn	Ice dance
Silver medal – second place	2026 Beijing	Ice dance
U.S. Championships
Bronze medal – third place	2025 Wichita	Ice dance

Caroline Green (born October 3, 2003) is an American ice dancer. With her skating partner, Michael Parsons, she is a two time Four Continents medalists (gold in 2022 and silver in 2026), a four-time ISU Grand Prix bronze medalist, a seven-time medalist on the ISU Challenger Series, and a six-time U.S. national medalist.

With her brother and former skating partner Gordon Green, she placed in the top six at the 2018 World Junior Championships and won the 2019 U.S. national junior title.

== Early life ==
Caroline Green was born on October 3, 2003, in Washington, D.C. Her mother, Mary, is a forensic scientist and her father, Richard, is a periodontist. She is the younger sister of Gordon Green. She attended Julius West Middle School before enrolling at Richard Montgomery High School in Rockville, Maryland.

== Career ==
=== Partnership with Green ===
==== Early years ====
Green began learning to skate when she was five years old. She teamed up with her brother in August 2009 and joined the Wheaton Ice Skating Academy in September. The siblings took gold in the juvenile category at the 2013 U.S. Championships and won the intermediate title at the 2014 edition.

At the 2015 and 2016 U.S. Championships, the Greens took gold in the novice category. They then moved up to the junior level domestically and placed fifth at the 2017 U.S. Championships.

==== 2017–18 season: International junior debut ====
Having become age-eligible for junior international events, the Greens made their ISU Junior Grand Prix (JGP) debut, winning bronze in Riga, Latvia, and Gdańsk, Poland. They finished as third alternates for the JGP Final.

In January, they took silver at the 2018 U.S. Championships, scoring 12.46 points less than champions Carreira/Ponomarenko, and were assigned to the 2018 World Junior Championships in Sofia. In Bulgaria, the siblings ranked fifth in the short dance, seventh in the free dance, and sixth overall.

==== 2018–19 season: National junior title ====
The Greens withdrew from their JGP assignments due to Caroline's illness. She subsequently commented that having been off the ice for two months and having to readjust to skating was a significant challenge, as neither sibling had had to deal with a major injury before. Returning to competition, they won junior gold medals at the 2018 Golden Spin of Zagreb in December and at the Toruń Cup in early January. At the 2019 U.S. Championships, they outscored Nguyen/Kolesnik by 1.48 points to become national junior champions.

The Greens concluded the season at the 2019 World Junior Championships. Caroline stumbled during the tango pattern dance segment in the rhythm dance, leading to an eighth-place finish. They improved in the free dance, moving up to seventh place.

Following the end of the competitive season, Gordon decided to retire from competitive ice dance to focus on academics, while Caroline opted to continue skating. On June 20, it was announced that she teamed up with Michael Parsons, the 2017 World Junior champion.

=== Partnership with Parsons ===
==== 2019–20 season: Debut of Green/Parsons ====
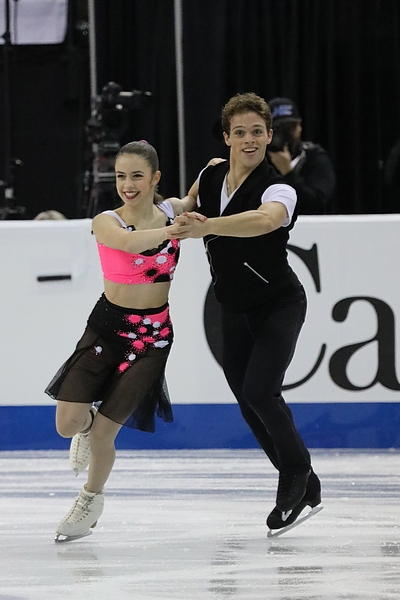
Green/Parsons at the 2019 Skate Canada

Moving to the senior level, Green/Parsons placed fifth at Lake Placid Ice Dance International and the 2019 CS Lombardia Trophy. Making their senior Grand Prix debut as a team, they placed seventh at 2019 Skate America. Green remarked that the transition to the senior level had "definitely been mainly adapting to longer programs and more demanding elements. I think that it is a challenge that I am ready for." Competing the following week at the 2019 Skate Canada International, Green/Parsons again placed seventh. They won their first international medal, a bronze, at the 2019 CS Warsaw Cup behind Lauriault/Le Gac of France and Russia's Konkina/Drozd.

Competing at their first U.S. Championships, Green/Parsons placed fifth in the rhythm dance. They were fifth in the free dance, despite a fall. Parsons said afterward that they were "still a very young team, but it's coming along faster than I ever expected. I couldn't be more proud; I am very happy."

==== 2020–21 season ====
The coronavirus pandemic and resultant lockdowns resulted in Green and Parsons not being able to see or train with each other from March to June. Caroline enlisted her brother Gordon as a training partner at home. In order to limit international travel, the ISU assigned the Grand Prix based on geographic location, and Green/Parsons attended the 2020 Skate America. They finished in fourth place.

Green/Parsons went on to finish fourth at the 2021 U.S. Championships, taking the pewter medal.

==== 2021–22 season: Four Continents gold ====
For their free dance, Green, Parsons, and their choreographers opted to design a program in emulation of Martha Graham's style of modern dance, which Parsons characterized as involving "a lot of emotion into almost sparse movements."

Green/Parsons made their Olympic season debut at the 2021 CS Autumn Classic International, winning the bronze medal. Competing next on the Grand Prix at the 2021 Skate Canada International, they finished in fourth place. They were initially assigned to the 2021 Cup of China as their second Grand Prix, but following its cancellation, they were reassigned to the 2021 Gran Premio d'Italia. They placed fourth in the rhythm dance but dropped to fifth place after Green fell exiting a lift in the free dance.

Entering the 2022 U.S. Championships seeking to qualify for the third berth on the American Olympic team, Green/Parsons placed third in the rhythm dance despite a twizzle error, slightly ahead of defending national bronze medalists Hawayek/Baker, who also had a twizzle error. They were fourth in the free dance and dropped behind Hawayek/Baker overall, taking the pewter medal. They were named first alternates for the Olympic team and were sent to compete at the 2022 Four Continents Championships in Tallinn, where they won the gold medal. Parsons reflected on not making the Olympic team, saying, "even while not making the team, we set ourselves up very well for the next four years, and this is a great starting point right here. Not making the team is certainly a motivation."

==== 2022–23 season: First Grand Prix medal, World Championships debut ====
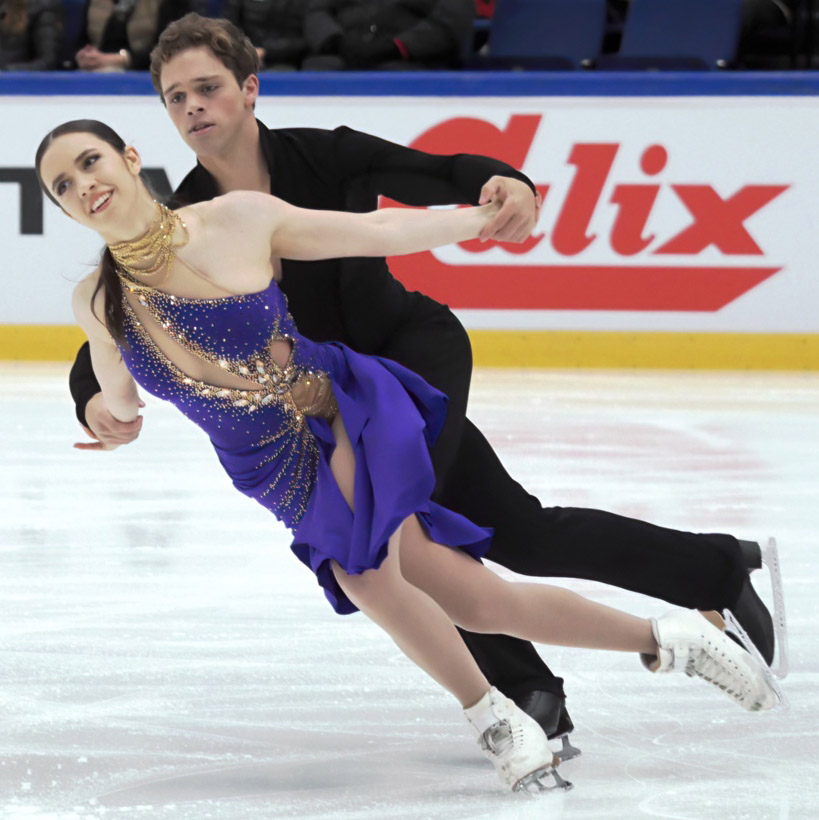
Green/Parsons during their rhythm dance at the 2022 CS Finlandia Trophy

Green and Parsons left their longtime coaches at Wheaton Ice Dance Academy to train at the new Michigan Ice Dance Academy founded by retired Olympic medalists Charlie White and Tanith Belbin. Of the change, Parsons said, "these next four years are about pushing ourselves as skaters, as artists, and as people."

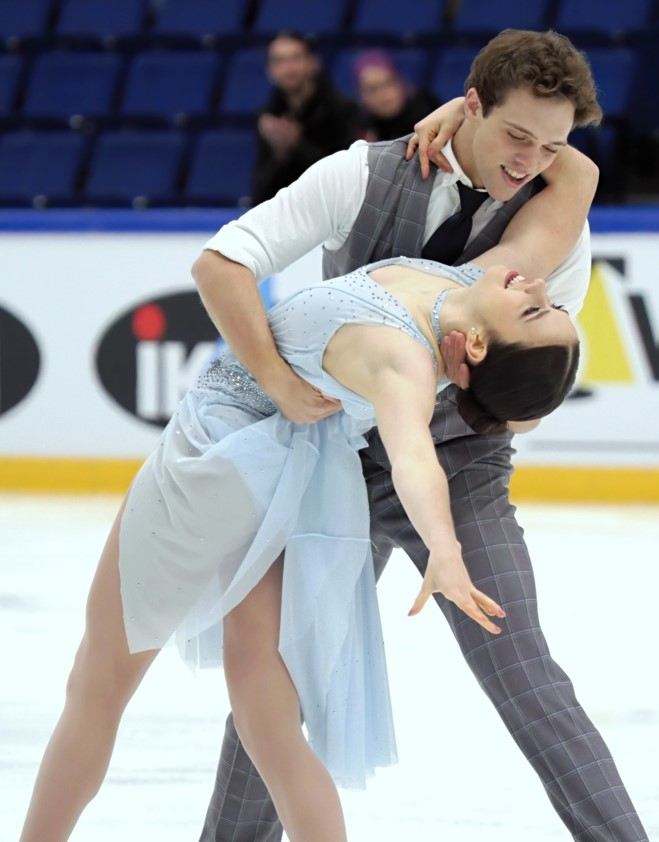
Green/Parsons during their free dance at the 2022 CS Finlandia Trophy

Beginning the season at the 2022 CS Finlandia Trophy, Green/Parsons placed fifth. In their first Grand Prix at the 2022 Skate Canada International, the team placed narrowly third in the rhythm dance but were overtaken in the free dance by Canadians Lajoie/Lagha and finished in fourth place, albeit significantly improving their scores over the Finlandia Trophy. At their second Grand Prix, the 2022 NHK Trophy in Sapporo, they won the bronze medal, their first Grand Prix medal as a partnership and Green's first.

With presumptive national silver medalists Hawayek/Baker missing the 2023 U.S. Championships for health reasons, Green/Parsons entered the event as the favourites for the silver, and finished almost ten points clear of bronze medalists Carreira/Ponomarenko.

Green/Parsons entered the 2023 Four Continents Championships as contenders for the bronze medal, but after Parsons fell in the rhythm dance they placed fifth in that segment, 9.05 points back of Lajoie/Lagha in third. They placed fourth in the free dance, but remained in fifth overall, and finishing behind Carreira/Ponomarenko, who came fourth. Parsons said that they were happy with their performance on the day. They finished sixth in their World Championship debut.

==== 2023–24 season: Second consecutive Grand Prix medal ====
Green/Parsons came sixth at the 2023 CS Lombardia Trophy. Following advice from judges there, they opted to discard their original Paula Abdul rhythm dance, switching to a medley of music from Scorpions. Creating the latter program over a period of only a few weeks was "a great learning experience," in the team's view. In its first outing at the 2023 Skate America, they finished fifth in the rhythm dance, and rose to fourth after the free dance. Parsons called the result "a big step towards where we want to be compared to Lombardia Trophy." At their second Grand Prix, the 2023 Cup of China, they placed third in the rhythm dance despite Green losing a twizzle level. Parsons commented that they had "debuted this program at Skate America and at that point it was two weeks old. So now it is four weeks' old and we are happy with progress." Third in the free dance as well, they won their second Grand Prix bronze medal.

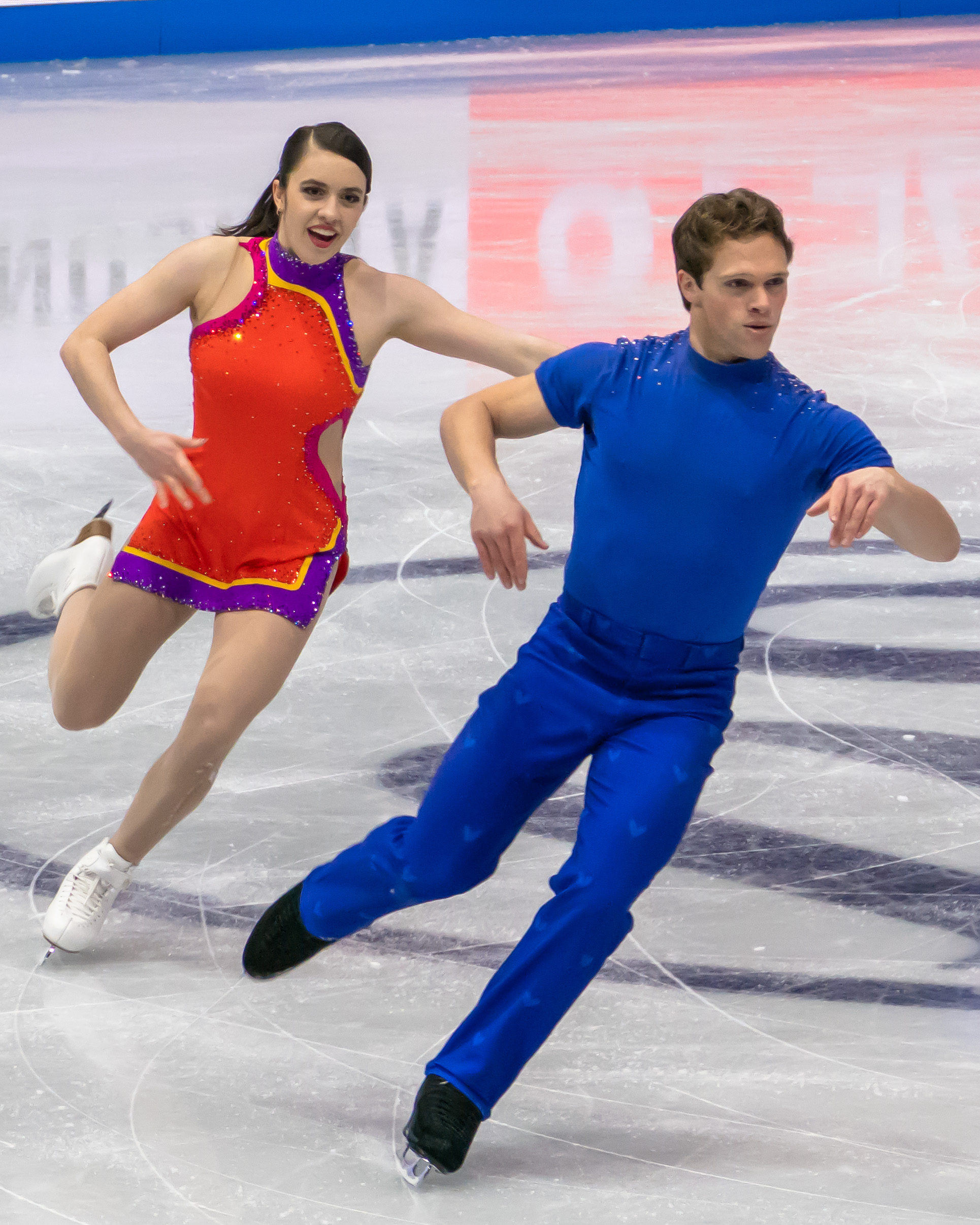
Green and Parsons during their rhythm dance at the 2025 World Championships

In advance of the 2024 U.S. Championships, Green/Parsons were named to the American team for the 2024 Four Continents Championships in Shanghai. They were third in the rhythm dance at the national championships, but multiple errors in the free dance dropped them to fourth place, taking the pewter medal. Parsons deemed it "a disappointing skate." At Four Continents they came fifth in the rhythm dance, and finished sixth overall after a sixth-place free dance. Green said they were "well prepared for a sharp off-season."

==== 2024–25 season ====
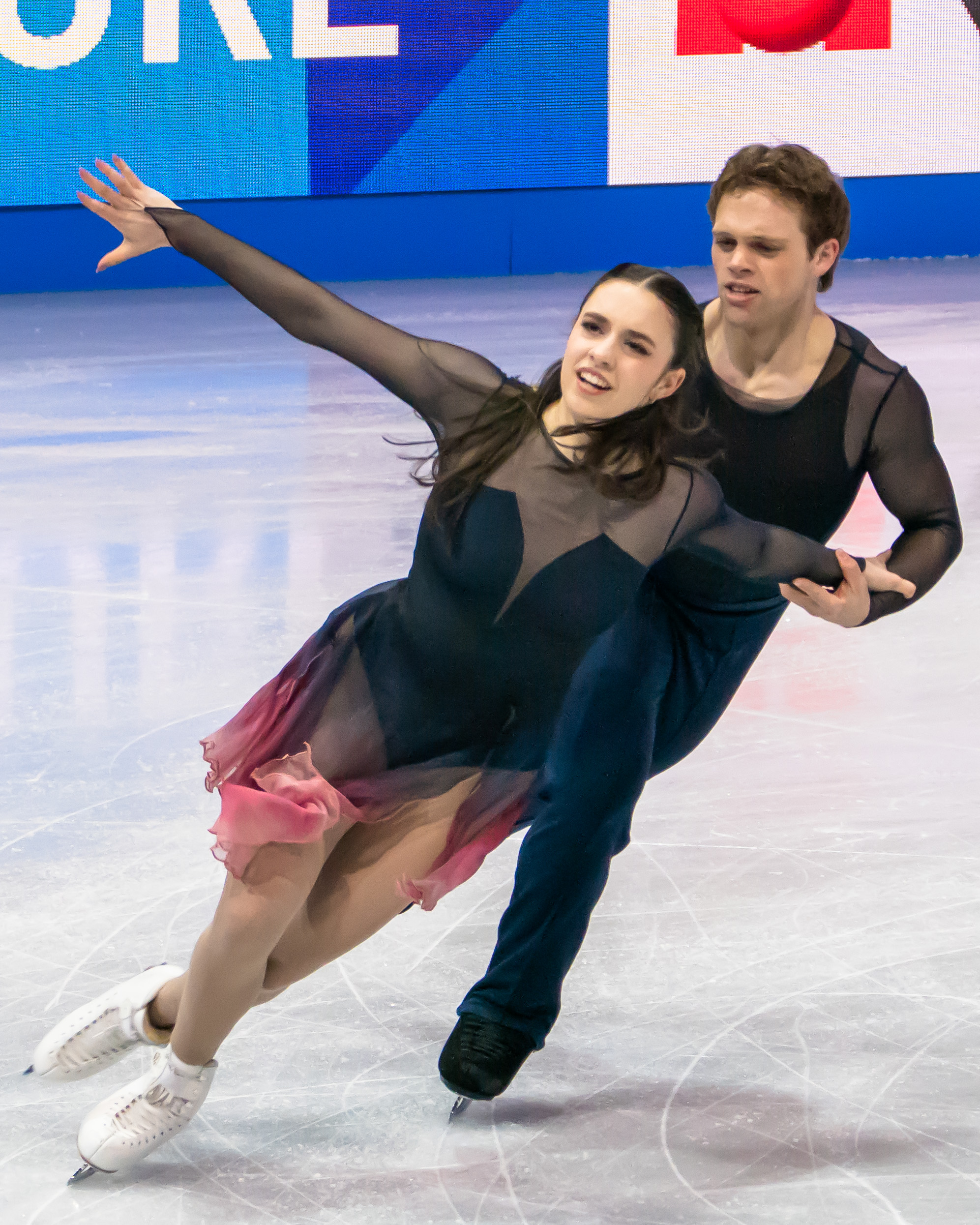
Green and Parsons during their free dance at the 2025 World Championships

Green and Parsons began the season by winning silver at the 2024 Trophée Métropole Nice Côte d'Azur. Going on to compete on the 2024–25 Grand Prix circuit, they finished fourth at the 2024 NHK Trophy. In their second event, they were sixth at the 2024 Cup of China.

At the 2025 U.S. Championships in Wichita, Green/Parsons and Zingas/Kolesnik both received an 82.13 score in the rhythm dance, but as Zingas/Kolesnik had the higher technical score they placed third in the segment, while Green/Parsons were fourth. They rose to third after the free dance, claiming the bronze medal. Parsons revealed that he had been dealing with injuries during the prior season, "so this season started off as a comeback. I no longer think that that's an appropriate term to apply to this season, because we are not coming back anymore. We are better than we have been, and we are going to continue getting better."

Rather than attend the 2025 Four Continents Championships, Green/Parsons were assigned to the Road to 26 Trophy, the test event for the 2026 Winter Olympics in Milan's Forum di Milano. They won the silver medal. Finishing the season at the 2025 World Championships, Green/Parsons placed ninth. He said they "put down two skates we're really proud of," while she added: "Any time we get to skate in front of a crowd like this, we're so incredibly blessed and lucky. And just to have another experience with that type of pressure going into the Olympic season, we're so honored."

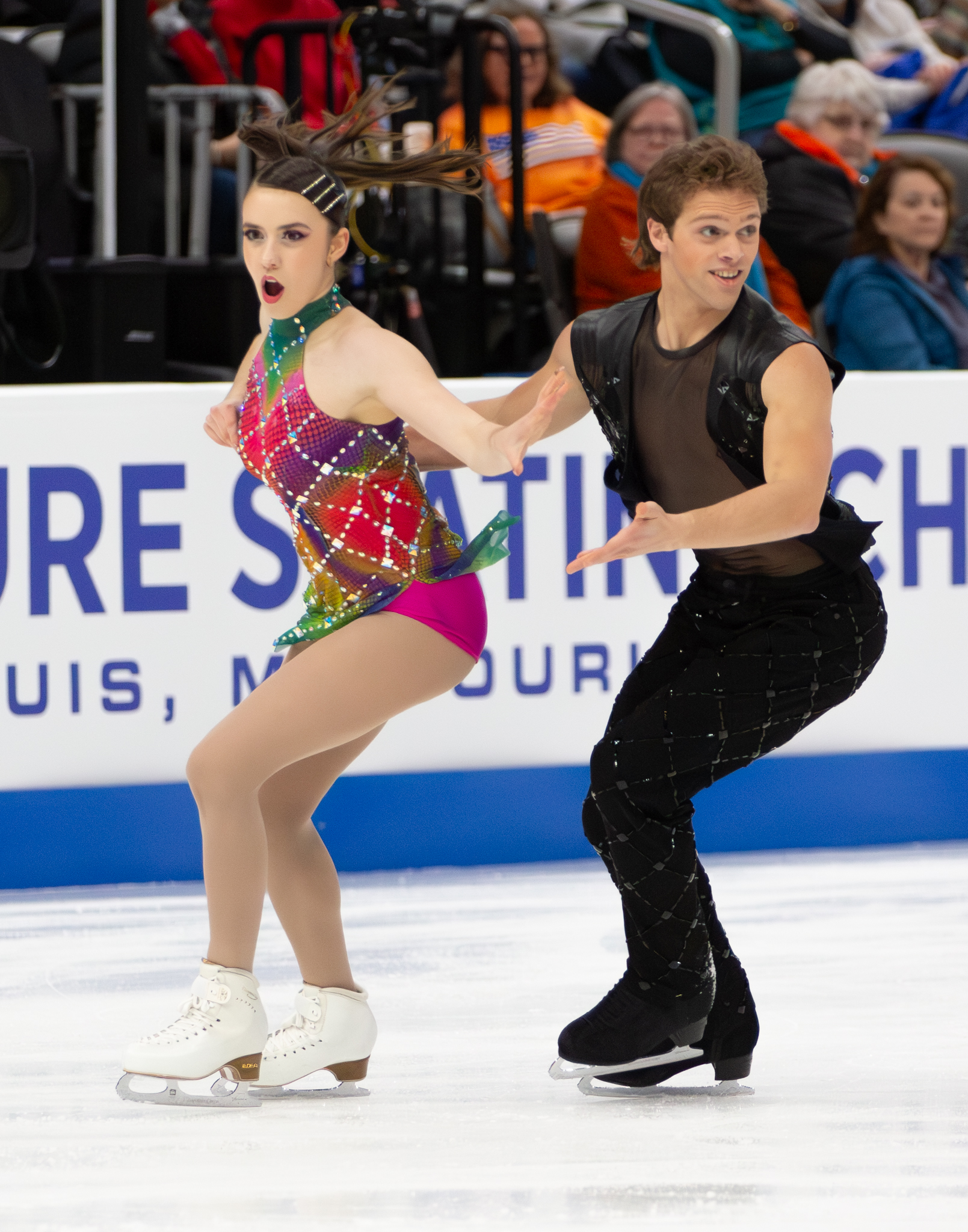
Green and Parsons during their rhythm dance at the 2026 U.S. Championships

==== 2025–26 season: Four Continents silver and Grand Prix medal ====
Green/Parsons opened their season by winning bronze at the 2025 CS Nepela Memorial.

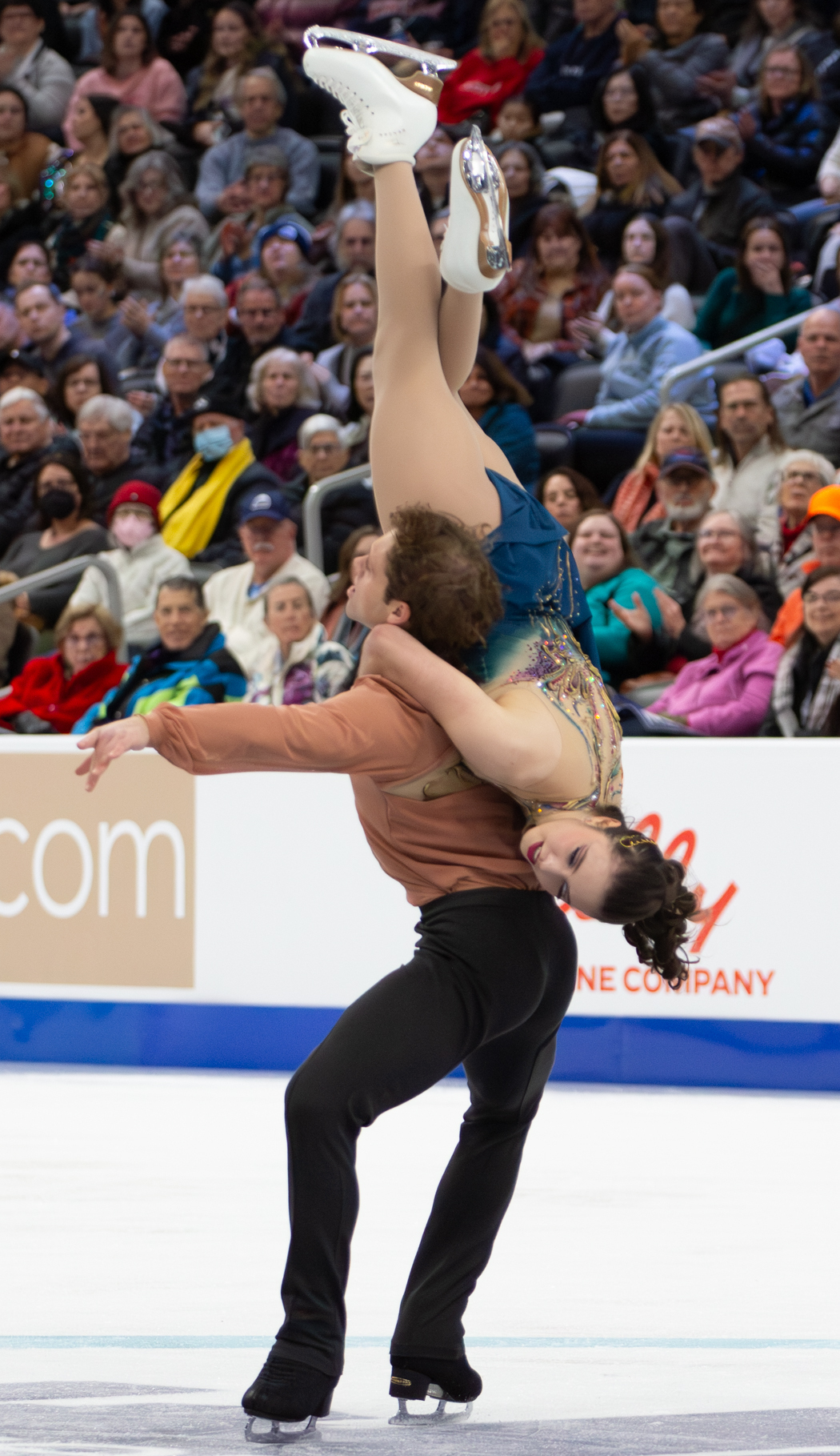
Green and Parsons performing a lift during their free dance at the 2026 U.S. Championships

The following month, they competed at the 2025 Cup of China, but were forced to withdraw before the free dance segment due to Parsons sustaining a pelvic injury during their rhythm dance. "We were giving it our best shot at the practice this morning, giving it a best shot at the warm-up, but at the end of the day, I didn’t feel stable or strong enough to do this program safely with my partner," said Parsons. "It’s really disappointing. I think we both really wanted to get there and show our program to the crowd and everybody watching on TV. But today was not the day to do it, so we’ll say it was time to rest, to recover. We work with the medical team here and look forward to NHK."

In November, the team won the bronze at 2025 NHK Trophy. “I think it’s safe to say that Michael and I have learned a lot in these past three weeks that we’ve been away here in Asia,” said Green. “To go from one of the most difficult experiences of our careers, having to withdraw from the free dance in China, to having the skates that we did here at NHK, has just been really rewarding." They followed this up by winning bronze at the 2025 CS Warsaw Cup.

Two months later, Green and Parsons finished fourth at the 2026 U.S. Championships. They were subsequently named as the first alternates for the 2026 Winter Olympic team and to the 2026 Four Continents team.

Less than two weeks later, Green and Parsons took the silver medal at the 2026 Four Continents Figure Skating Championships. “Every year, every season that we have is different in many ways, and we’ve had some ups and downs since the last Olympic Games,” Parsons summed up. “To be in a very similar position where we’re alternates with the Games and successful at Four Continents, is bittersweet."

Following the withdrawal of Madison Chock and Evan Bates from the 2026 World Championships, Green and Parsons were called up to compete. They earned 12th place at the event.

==== 2026–27 season: Grand Prix bronze ====
Green/Parsons opened their season by finishing 5th place at the 2026 CS Nepela Memorial. They debuted their Hamilton rhythm dance and tango free dance. After the event, they gave an interview where they expressed satisfaction at their free dance performance to recover after an unfortunate rhythm dance.

In early November, Green/Parsons claimed the bronze medal at 2026 Skate Canada International. “This whole week, I think we showed the work that we’ve been doing at home with our whole team," said Parsons "It was a fight for the whole program, but we stayed together, and it felt like we attacked until the very last step, and that’s all I could ask for.”

Three weeks later, Green/Parsons placed fourth at 2026 Finlandia Trophy. “It was a tough week, but I’m proud of how we stayed together and fought through it,” said Parsons. “Not every competition goes as planned, but we stayed strong. We really relied on each other here, and I think it shows the strength of our partnership.”

== Programs ==
=== Ice dance with Michael Parsons ===
Season	Rhythm dance	Free dance	Exhibition
2019–20	Quickstep: Screw Loose (from Cry-Baby) by Adam Schlesinger, David Javerbaum performed by Alli Mauzey; Blues: Baby Baby Baby Baby (from Cry-Baby) by Adam Schlesinger, David Javerbaum performed by James Snyder, Elizabeth Stanley choreo. by Elena Novak, Alexei Kiliakov	Conquest of Spaces; I Love You by Woodkid choreo. by Elena Novak, Alexei Kiliakov	
2020–21	Foxtrot: I Turned the Corner (from Thoroughly Modern Millie) by Gavin Creel & Sutton Foster; Quickstep: What Do I Need With Love (from Thoroughly Modern Millie) by Gavin Creel choreo. by Elena Novak, Alexei Kiliakov	Dance 4 Me; Nothing Compares 2 U; Raspberry Beret by Prince choreo. by Elena Novak, Alexei Kiliakov	
2021–22	My Lovin' (You're Never Gonna Get It) by En Vogue; Rhythm Nation by Janet Jackson choreo. by Elena Novak, Alexei Kiliakov, Jimmie Manners	Violin Concerto No. 1 "EsoConcerto"; Clouds, The Mind on the Wind by Ezio Bosso choreo. by Elena Novak, Alexei Kiliakov	
2022–23	Samba: Vocalizado by Alessandro Olivato; Rhumba: Historia de un Amor performed by Cesária Évora; Samba: Boutique by Watazu choreo. by Charlie White, Tanith White, Greg Zuerlein	Rhapsody in Blue by George Gershwin performed by the Royal Philharmonic Orchestra choreo. by Charlie White, Tanith White, Greg Zuerlein	Singin' in the Rain by Gene Kelly; Yeah! by Usher, ft. Lil Jon and Ludacris
2023–24	Still Loving You; Rock You Like a Hurricane by Scorpions choreo. by Charlie White, Tanith White, Greg Zuerlein, Jaymz Tuaileva; Straight Up by Paula Abdul, Elliot Wolff, & Keith Cohen; Cold Hearted by Paula Abdul & Elliot Wolff choreo. by Charlie White, Tanith White, Greg Zuerlein, Jaymz Tuaileva	Denmark by The Portland Cello Project & Gideon Freudmann; Wind and Snow by Annalisa Tornfelt, Gideon Freudmann, & The Portland Cello Project; Denmark by The Portland Cello Project & Gideon Freudmann choreo. by Charlie White, Tanith White, Greg Zuerlein, Jaymz Tuaileva	Singin' in the Rain by Gene Kelly; Yeah! by Usher, ft. Lil Jon and Ludacris
2024–25	These Boots Are Made for Walkin' (SILO x Martin Wave Remix) by Nancy Sinatra performed by The Supremes & Martin Wave; Soul Bossa Nova by Quincy Jones choreo. by Jean-Luc Baker	Spiegel im Spiegel by Arvo Pärt performed by Angèle Dubeau & La Pietà; Dance Me to the End of Love by Douglas Dare choreo. by Jean-Luc Baker	Sunset Boulevard by Andrew Lloyd Webber; Sunset Boulevard performed by Tom Francis; With One Look performed by Nicole Scherzinger
2025–26	Groove Is in the Heart by Deee-Lite; I'm Too Sexy by Right Said Fred; Groove Is in the Heart (Scotty 2025 Remix) by Deee-Lite choreo. by Krisilyn “Tony” Frazier, Tanith White, Greg Zuerlein, Jean-Luc Baker, Caroline Green, Michael Parsons	Escalate by Tsar B; Son of Nyx by Hozier choreo. by Krisilyn “Tony” Frazier, Tanith White, Greg Zuerlein, Jean-Luc Baker, Caroline Green, Michael Parsons	Sunset Boulevard by Andrew Lloyd Webber; Sunset Boulevard performed by Tom Francis; With One Look performed by Nicole Scherzinger

=== With Green ===
Season	Rhythm dance	Free dance	Exhibition
2018–2019	Tango: Essa by Otros Aires	The Devil's Violinist by Niccolò Paganini	Kick the Dust Up by Luke Bryan
	Short dance		
2017–2018	Cha Cha: Chilled Mambo by Mambo Molly & The Five Alarms; Rhumba: Donde esta tu amor by Alejandro Jaen performed by Son by Four; Samba: Samba Latina (soundtrack)	Polovtsian Dances (from Prince Igor) by Alexander Borodin; Stranger in Paradise performed by Sarah Brightman; Polovtsian Dances (from Prince Igor) by Alexander Borodin	
2016–2017	Burnitup! by Janet Jackson, Missy Elliott; Let's Wait Awhile by Janet Jackson	Pulp Fiction	
2015–2016	Am I Blue? by Linda Ronstadt	The Barber of Seville: Overture by Gioachino Rossini	
2014–2015		The Addams Family	
2013–2014		Samba Pa Ti by Carlos Santana; Mambo! by Helena Paparizou	

== Competitive highlights ==
- GP – Event of the ISU Grand Prix Series
- JGP – Event of the ISU Junior Grand Prix Series
- CS – Event of the ISU Challenger Series
- TBD – Assigned
- WD – Withdrew from competition
- C – Event was cancelled

=== Ice dance with Michael Parsons ===
Competition placements at senior level
Season	2019–20	2020–21	2021–22	2022–23	2023–24	2024–25	2025–26	2026–27
World Championships				6th		9th	12th	
Four Continents Championships			1st	5th	6th		2nd	
U.S. Championships	5th	4th	4th	2nd	4th	3rd	4th	
GP Cup of China			C		3rd	6th	WD	
GP Finland								4th
GP Italy			5th					
GP NHK Trophy				3rd		4th	3rd	
GP Skate America	7th	4th			4th			
GP Skate Canada	7th		4th	4th				3rd
CS Autumn Classic			3rd					
CS Denis Ten Memorial								3rd
CS Finlandia Trophy				5th				
CS Golden Spin of Zagreb	3rd							
CS Lombardia Trophy	5th				6th			
CS Nepela Memorial							3rd	5th
CS Trophée Métropole Nice						2nd		
CS Warsaw Cup	3rd		3rd				3rd	
Road to 26 Trophy						2nd		
Lake Placid Ice Dance	5th		1st					

=== With Green ===
International: Junior
Event	16–17	17–18	18–19
Junior Worlds		6th	7th
JGP Latvia		3rd	
JGP Poland		3rd	
Golden Spin			1st
Lake Placid IDI		2nd	
Toruń Cup			1st
National
U.S. Championships	5th J	2nd J	1st J

== Detailed results ==
=== Ice dance with Michael Parsons ===
ISU personal best scores in the +5/-5 GOE System
Segment	Type	Score	Event
Total	TSS	201.44	2023 World Championships
Rhythm dance	TSS	80.62	2022 Four Continents Championship
Rhythm dance	TES	46.66	2022 Four Continents Championship
Rhythm dance	PCS	34.39	2022 Four Continents Championship
Free dance	TSS	122.70	2023 World Championships
Free dance	TES	69.20	2023 World Championships
Free dance	PCS	53.50	2023 World Championships

==== Senior level ====
Results in the 2019–20 season
Date	Event	RD		FD		Total	
Date	Event	P	Score	P	Score	P	Score
Jul 30 – Aug 2, 2019	(United States) 2019 Lake Placid Ice Dance	—N/a	—N/a	—N/a	—N/a	5	—N/a
Sep 13–15, 2019	(Italy) 2019 CS Lombardia Trophy	7	65.11	3	105.42	5	170.53
Oct 18–20, 2019	(United States) 2019 Skate America	8	67.97	7	105.06	7	173.03
Oct 25–27, 2019	2019 Skate Canada International	8	69.00	7	104.82	7	173.82
Nov 14–17, 2019	(Poland) 2019 CS Warsaw Cup	3	67.40	3	104.76	3	172.16
Dec 4–7, 2019	(Croatia) 2019 CS Golden Spin of Zagreb	4	74.18	3	112.92	3	187.10
Jan 20–26, 2020	(United States) 2020 U.S. Championships	5	77.42	5	102.83	5	180.25

Results in the 2020–21 season
Date	Event	RD		FD		Total	
Date	Event	P	Score	P	Score	P	Score
Oct 23–24, 2020	(United States) 2020 Skate America	4	74.98	4	103.07	4	178.05
Jan 11–21, 2021	(United States) 2021 U.S. Championships	4	80.10	4	112.29	4	192.39

Results in the 2021–22 season
Date	Event	RD		FD		Total	
Date	Event	P	Score	P	Score	P	Score
Aug 12–15, 2021	(United States) 2021 Lake Placid Ice Dance	2	65.78	1	109.20	1	174.98
Sep 16–18, 2021	(Canada) 2021 CS Autumn Classic International	3	73.93	3	114.50	3	188.43
Oct 29–31, 2021	2021 Skate Canada International	4	72.40	4	114.11	4	186.51
Nov 5–7, 2021	(Italy) 2021 Gran Premio d'Italia	4	75.60	6	102.66	5	178.26
Nov 17–20, 2021	(Poland) 2021 CS Warsaw Cup	3	75.35	3	112.49	3	187.84
Jan 3–9, 2022	(United States) 2022 U.S. Championships	3	80.85	4	122.42	4	203.27
Jan 18–23, 2022	(Estonia) 2022 Four Continents Championships	1	80.62	1	119.97	1	200.59

Results in the 2022–23 season
Date	Event	RD		FD		Total	
Date	Event	P	Score	P	Score	P	Score
Oct 4–9, 2022	(Finland) 2022 CS Finlandia Trophy	5	72.64	5	104.70	5	177.34
Oct 28–30, 2022	2022 Skate Canada International	3	76.13	4	118.06	4	194.19
Nov 18–20, 2022	(Japan) 2022 NHK Trophy	3	77.00	4	114.10	3	191.10
Jan 23–29, 2023	(United States) 2023 U.S. Championships	2	81.40	2	126.06	2	207.46
Feb 7–12, 2023	(United States) 2023 Four Continents Championships	5	69.99	4	116.89	5	186.88
Mar 22–26, 2023	(Japan) 2023 World Championships	6	78.74	6	122.70	6	201.44

Results in the 2023–24 season
Date	Event	RD		FD		Total	
Date	Event	P	Score	P	Score	P	Score
Sep 8–10, 2023	(Italy) 2023 CS Lombardia Trophy	4	68.44	7	100.12	6	168.56
Oct 20–22, 2023	(United States) 2023 Skate America	5	75.05	4	110.02	4	185.07
Nov 10–12, 2023	2023 Cup of China	3	76.07	3	113.26	3	189.33
Jan 22–28, 2024	(United States) 2024 U.S. Championships	3	80.91	4	112.92	4	193.83
Jan 30 – Feb 4, 2024	(China) 2024 Four Continents Championships	5	75.37	6	115.16	6	190.53

Results in the 2024–25 season
Date	Event	RD		FD		Total	
Date	Event	P	Score	P	Score	P	Score
Oct 16–20, 2024	(France) 2024 CS Trophée Métropole Nice Côte d'Azur	2	73.70	1	112.77	2	186.47
Nov 8–10, 2024	(Japan) 2024 NHK Trophy	4	74.38	4	114.38	4	188.76
Nov 22–24, 2024	2024 Cup of China	6	75.63	6	114.23	6	189.86
Jan 20–26, 2025	(United States) 2025 U.S. Championships	4	82.13	3	123.24	3	205.37
Feb 19–20, 2025	(Italy) 2025 Road to 26 Trophy	2	77.18	2	118.93	2	196.11
Mar 25–30, 2025	(United States) 2025 World Championships	7	77.51	11	114.96	9	192.47

Results in the 2025–26 season
Date	Event	RD		FD		Total	
Date	Event	P	Score	P	Score	P	Score
Sep 25–27, 2025	(Slovakia) 2025 CS Nepela Memorial	7	71.77	2	112.41	3	184.18
Oct 24–26, 2025	2025 Cup of China	7	65.83	–	–	–	WD
Nov 7–9, 2025	(Japan) 2025 NHK Trophy	3	75.14	3	112.76	3	187.90
Nov 19–23, 2025	(Poland) 2025 CS Warsaw Cup	2	79.09	7	110.18	3	189.27
Jan 4–11, 2026	(United States) 2026 U.S. Championships	4	80.55	4	121.50	4	202.05
Jan 21–25, 2026	(China) 2026 Four Continents Championships	2	78.66	3	116.06	2	194.72
Mar 24–29, 2026	(Czech Republic) 2026 World Championships	13	76.42	11	113.56	12	189.98

Results in the 2026–27 season
Date	Event	RD		FD		Total	
Date	Event	P	Score	P	Score	P	Score
Sep 24–27, 2026	(Slovakia) 2026 CS Nepela Memorial	10	68.12	4	110.66	5	178.78
Oct 7–11, 2026	(Kazakhstan) 2026 CS Denis Ten Memorial Challenge	1	78.64	4	101.73	3	180.37
Oct 30 – Nov 1, 2026	2026 Skate Canada International	3	74.24	3	111.78	3	186.02
Nov 20–21, 2026	(Finland) 2026 Finlandia Trophy	5	75.21	4	109.40	4	184.61
