= Denmark (2010 film) =

2010 short film by Daniel Fickle

- Denmark theatrical poster
- Directed by: Daniel Fickle
- Screenplay by: Daniel Fickle; Mark Smith; Courtney Eck
- Produced by: Courtney Eck; Mark Smith; Adam Shearer
- Starring: Pily
- Cinematography: Daniel Fickle; Mark Smith; Veronica Wood
- Edited by: Jesse Salsberry
- Music by: Gideon Freudmann; Portland Cello Project
- Production company: Two Penguins Productions
- Release date: May 15, 2010
- Running time: 6 minutes
- Country: United States
- Language: English

Theatrical Trailer

Interview with director Daniel Fickle

Denmark is a 2010 short film co-written and directed by Daniel Fickle and scored by Gideon Freudmann of The Portland Cello Project. Utilizing puppetry and hand-built sets the film tells a story about Pily, a crustacean of mixed origin, who builds a rocket ship to escape his underwater home when it becomes threatened by pollution.

Denmark premiered at the Aladdin Theatre on May 15, 2010 in Portland, Oregon. The film achieved critical success thereafter largely through established film festivals and numerous features on websites.

== Plot ==
Pily lives a pastoral life at the bottom of Oregon's Willamette River. He tends to his underwater crops in solitude and proves to be resourceful. His home is built from flotsam and sunken debris.

Seemingly content in the world he has built for himself, Pily is actually addled by a premonition that an invasive element is going to displace him. To prepare for the worst Pily devises an escape plan. He builds a rocketship.

When Pily's anxiety gives way to the reality of an oil spill his rocketship is ready except for one part that's essential to achieve liftoff. Pily goes ashore where he finds the missing part and returns to initiate his escape. Once airborne Pily is confronted with another challenge and reaches for a solution that doesn't exist.

== Back story ==
"Denmark" is the title of the first track from The Portland Cello Project's album, A Thousand Words. The song was written by cellist Gideon Freudmann to honor the loss of a loved one who lost a battle to cancer; the song is a love letter and an inspired response against the indiscriminate nature of fate.

The film uses a stark form of humor to resonate the interplay of alienation, turmoil, and other emotions that are associated with reconciling loss. Recognizing that laughter has long been a way to cope with life's irreducible realities, the creators of Denmark, the film, use humor as a narrative device to mollify anguish and convey empathy.

== Pily ==
Jason Miranda and Bill Holznagel were the hands behind Pily's performance in Denmark. The puppeteers used traditional means to create Pily's actions; Marionette bars, strings and wires. They also employed glove puppet techniques to move the puppet's eyes.

== Official selections ==
- SXSW
- Cinequest Film Festival
- Palm Beach International Film Festival
- Ashland Independent Film Festival
- Byron Bay Film Festival
- Sene
- Zero Film Festival
- Ferndale Film Festival
- Ann Arbor Film Festival
- Olympia Film Festival
- Canada International Film Festival
- Atlanta Film Festival
- Bahamas International Film Festival
- Los Angeles Cinema Festival of Hollywood
- Chicago International REEL Shorts Festival
- Vancouver DSLR Film Festival
- California Independent Film Festival
- Science Fiction Fantasy Short Film Festival
- Santa Catalina Film festival
- Buffalo Niagara Film Festival
- Victoria Film Festival
- Desert Dust Cinema Short Film Festival
- Athens Video Art Festival
- Alpha-Ville Festival
- Park City Music Film Festival
- Albuquerque Film Festival
- Fantadia International Multivision Festival
- California International Shorts Festival
- New Orleans Film Festival
- Crested Butte Film Festival
- Milwaukee Film Festival
- Sapporo International Short Film Festival
- Imagine Science Film Festival
- Malibu Film Festival
- Radar Hamburg International Independent Film Festival
- Philadelphia Film & Animation Festival
- Henson International Festival BAM
- Imagine Science Film Festival Dublin

== Awards ==
- Royal Reel Award: Canada International Film festival 2011
- Best Music Video: Los Angeles Cinema of Hollywood 2010
- Gold Medal for music in a short film: Park City Film Music Festival 2011
- Best Music Video: Radar Hamburg International Independent Film Festival 2011
