= Mathematically Alive =

2007 film

- Directed by: Katherine Foronjy; Joseph Coburn
- Produced by: Vitamin Enriched Inc.
- Cinematography: Joseph Coburn
- Edited by: Joseph Coburn
- Distributed by: Vitamin Enriched Inc.
- Release date: 2007
- Running time: 94 Mins.
- Country: United States
- Language: English

Mathematically Alive: A Story of Fandom is a 2007 documentary film about fans of the New York Mets, directed by Katherine Foronjy and Joseph Coburn.

== Awards ==
- Best Documentary - 2007 - New Jersey Film Festival, NY
- Official Selection - 2007 - Coney Island Film Festival, NY
- Official Selection - 2008 - Trenton Film Festival, NJ
- Official Selection - 2008 - Westchester Film Festival, NY
- Official Selection - 2008 - New Filmmakers Series, NY
- Official Selection - 2008 - Baseball Film Festival - National Baseball Hall of Fame, NY
- Official Selection - 2008 - Sport Psychology Institute Conference - The University of Southern Maine
- Official Selection - 2008 - Queens Museum of Art, NY
- Official Selection - 2008 - Queens International Film Festival, NY
