= Mountain Gear =

American outdoor apparel retailer

Mountain Gear, Inc.
- Company type: S corporation
- Industry: Outdoor equipment and apparel (specialty) retailer
- Founded: 1983
- Headquarters: Spokane Valley, Washington, United States
- Website: mountaingear.com

Mountain Gear was a privately held online retailer of outdoor equipment and apparel, based in Spokane Valley, Washington in the United States. The business decided to close in 2019, beginning to close its in-person stores after the holiday season, and selling the rest of its inventory online through 2020. Mountain Gear closed primarily due to competition from online retailers, particularly Amazon. Owner Paul Fish mentioned that while their Spokane store managed to break even, the economics of running an independent operation had become unsustainable amidst the explosion of online platforms.

The company sold clothing and gear from brands including The North Face, Arc'teryx, Mountain Hardwear, Marmot, Black Diamond Equipment, Petzl and Keen Footwear. At its peak, it was an important member of the mountain climbing equipment community—estimating that in 2012 82% of Americans climbing everest and 90% of Americans who climbed K2 had been customers.

== History ==
Mountain Gear was founded in 1983 by Paul Fish and Karn Nielsen. At its inception, the company was a manufacturer specializing in handmade backpacks. Over time, the focus of the company shifted from manufacturing backpacks to retail, growing to include a nationwide mail-order catalog in 1993. As consumer behavior shifted online, Mountain Gear transitioned to online retail in 1995, becoming an early adopter of e-commerce while eventually becoming a vendor on Amazon to sustain its sales.

In 2001, Mountain Gear acquired MountainWoman.com, one of the first women's-specific outdoor websites, and in 2003 Shoreline Mountain Products, a web-based retailer that specialized in rock climbing. MountainWoman.com has been updated and rolled into the Devi Outdoor catalog and DeviOutdoor.com website. Shoreline was discontinued as an independent website and catalog a few years after the acquisition. From 2002 to 2006, Mountain Gear was listed by Success Magazine as one of America's 100 fastest-growing catalog businesses. The company moved into a renovated, 112,000-square-foot (10,400 m^{2}), environmentally sustainable distribution center and corporate headquarters in 2006.
