= The Bohicas =

English indie rock band

- Origin: Essex, England
- Genres: Rock; indie rock; post-punk
- Years active: 2013–2016
- Label: Domino
- Members: Dominic McGuinness; Brendan Heaney; Dominic John; Adrian Acolatse
- Website: www.thebohicas.com

The Bohicas were an English indie rock band from Essex, England, consisting of vocalist and guitarist Dominic McGuinness, drummer Brendan Heaney, guitarist Dominic John, and bassist Adrian Acolatse.

== Biography ==
Formed in Essex, England in 2013, The Bohicas have released one studio album, The Making Of, which reached number 52 on the UK Albums Chart, and have toured with acts such as Franz Ferdinand . In December 2015, the Bohicas performed at The New Adelphi Club, Hull, East Yorkshire, England.

"Where You At", a song from The Making Of, was used in a commercial for the Apple Music streaming service upon its redesign in 2016.

== Discography ==
=== Albums ===
- The Making Of (August 2015)

=== Extended plays ===
- The Bohicas (2014)

=== Singles ===
- "XXX" b/w "Swarm" (2014); written by Dominic McGuinness & Oli Bayston
- "The Making Of" [Radio Edit] (2014); written by Adrian Acolatse, Brendan Heaney, Dominic McGuinness & Dominic John
