= Heathcote Film Festival =

Annual short film festival held in Heathcote, Victoria

Coordinates: 36°55′23.56″S 144°42′23.48″E

- Genre: Short film festival
- Dates: August/September
- Frequency: Annually
- Locations: Heathcote, Victoria, Australia
- Years active: 2010–present
- Participants: Over 200
- Website: https://heathcotefilmfestival.com.au/

The Heathcote Film Festival is a short film festival held annually in Heathcote, in central Victoria. The festival has been operating since 2010. It showcases both international and Australian films, and provides a forum for emerging film-makers.

== History ==
The Heathcote Film Festival was initiated by a small group of community-minded volunteers who were interested in creating an annual event featuring both international and Australian short films. The event supports emerging filmmakers, with an award specifically for early-career filmmakers living in Australia. Awards are presented at each festival and include a Jury prize, an Emerging film-maker prize, and a People's choice award, which is voted on by festival attendees. Submitted films must be no longer than 15 minutes. In 2025, the committee received over seventy short film submissions.

The festival screens short films from a range of countries, and covers many different genres, including comedy, animation, drama, and documentary. It is held in the Heathcote RSL Hall and now extends over two evenings, one an informal night, and one a formal gala dinner. Local wines from the Heathcote region are available on both nights, with many wineries also sponsoring the event. An article in The Age included the event as one of the "Six reasons to visit Heathcote."

The festival was awarded a Bendigo Bank Community grant in 2024. This enabled the purchase of a projector, sound system, and a large screen, which organisers intend to make available for other community events.

== Guest speakers ==
- Jerry Grayson - Film chopper pilot and former Royal Navy award winner - Saturday, September 1, 2012
- Rodd Rathjen - Australian film director - Saturday, August 29, 2015

== Select past winners ==
Each year at the festival, a Jury Prize and a People's Choice Award are selected.

=== 2024 ===
Jury Prize	People's Choice Award
La Banyera (the Bathtub) by Sergi Marti Maltas	La Banyera (the Bathtub) by Sergi Marti Maltas (Friday) La Cena (The Dinner) by Jesús Martínez “Nota” (Saturday)

The Inaugural Emerging Filmmaker Prize was awarded to Ablaze by Danni Fenech.

=== 2023 ===
Jury Prize	People's Choice Award
Yellow by Elham Ehsas	Yellow by Elham Ehsas (Friday) A Simple F*cking Gesture by Jesse Shamata (Saturday)

=== 2019 ===
Jury Prize	People's Choice Award
Be You T.Fool by Brendan Pinches	Lost Property Office by Dan Agdag

=== 2018 ===
Jury Prize	People's Choice Award
Mrs McCutcheon by John Sheedy	Mrs McCutcheon by John Sheedy
