= Russell Harlow =

- Origin: Utah, United States of America
- Genres: Classical music
- Instrument: Clarinet
- Labels: ISOMIKE

Russell Harlow, a clarinetist, grew up in Los Angeles and lives in Utah. He is the co-director of the Beethoven Festival Park City (formerly named Park City International Music Festival) and Autumn Classics Music Festival and performs and records with the Sonolumina Ensemble. He also founded and directed the Nova Chamber Series in Utah before joining the Beethoven Festival in 1986.

== Career ==
Harlow studied first with clarinetist Gary Foster, then Mitchell Lurie, and at the age of twenty-one, joined the Utah Symphony where he served as Associate Principal Clarinet. He quit the Utah Symphony to pursue his solo, chamber music and recording career. He also studied with Harold (Buddy) Wright, the late Principal Clarinet with the Boston Symphony, and with violinist Charles Libove. During July 2007, Harlow performed at the International Clarfest in Vancouver, BC and has also performed at Clarfests in Texas, Utah and (in 2020) in Nevada.

Harlow worked with clarinetist and mouthpiece expert Lee Livengood on the design of a new clarinet mouthpiece. He has also republished a volume of etudes for clarinet by Louis DeSantis. The etudes are paraphrasic – melodic studies on difficult solo passages from Thomas, Liszt, Tchaikovsky, and Rimsky-Korsakoff. Harlow turned the work he had originally planned for an interactive DVD-Rom history of the clarinet into the website ClarinetCentral.com.

In 2015, Harlow, along with Lee Livengood, directed the annual Utah Clarinet Festival, held at Utah Valley University in Orem, Utah, where Harlow has served as interim clarinet professor for the year. The Russell Harlow Clarinet Competition at UVU is named in honor of Russell Harlow.

In addition to chamber music and orchestra performances and recordings, Harlow has recorded solos on a number of television and movie soundtracks.

He released a CD titled Works for Clarinets and Strings by Ingolf Dahl, Bohuslav Martinu and Karel Husa on the ISOMIKE label. As Associate Principal Clarinet with the Utah Symphony, Harlow is featured on nearly every recording the Symphony made from 1971 to 2012.
