= A Lawyer Walks into a Bar =

A Lawyer Walks Into a Bar...
- Directed by: Eric Chaikin
- Produced by: Tasha Oldham; Eric Chaikin
- Starring: Alan Dershowitz; Joe Jamail; Mark Lanier; Robert Shapiro; Nancy Grace; Len Jacoby; Eddie Griffin; Michael Ian Black; Sam Garrett; Tricia Zunker; Donald Baumeister; Magda Madrigal; Megan Meadows; Cassandra Hooks; Chad Troutwine
- Cinematography: Stephanie Martin
- Edited by: Deborah Barkow
- Music by: Daniel Fickle
- Distributed by: Camel's Back Films
- Release date: March 27, 2007 (AFI Dallas International Film Festival)
- Running time: 92 minutes
- Country: United States
- Language: English

A Lawyer Walks Into a Bar... is a 2007 independent film about lawyers, law school, the California Bar exam, and the obsession America has with its legal system. The film was covered by The Wall Street Journal, The Dallas Morning News, Premiere.com and on nationally syndicated television show At the Movies with Ebert & Roeper.

== Film content ==
The film highlights the trials and tribulations of trying to pass the State Bar of California exam and follows six wanna-be lawyers struggling to prepare and actually pass the test with the lowest national pass rate. One of the test takers in the documentary is Donald Baumeister, an ex-Marine, who had failed the California bar 41 times and is shown in the movie gearing up for attempt #42. A working father, Baumeister never had the time to properly study for the exam.

This movie portrays a common perception of American life – that, in the time of trouble, whether it be civil or criminal, Americans depend on lawyers to navigate the tough waters of today’s judicial system.

=== Festival accolades ===
A Lawyer Walks Into a Bar... won awards at independent film festivals including the Grand Jury Prize at AFI Dallas's Texas Competition, and Boulder Colorado's Toofy Fest's Best Narrative Feature.

=== A focus on minorities ===
A Lawyer Walks Into a Bar... portrays the fight of the average law school student, and of the minority law student trying to be admitted to a major state bar. The movie follows Magda Madrigal as she attends Peoples College of Law so that she can take the bar and be an advocate for people in her local Hispanic community.

=== Cast of characters ===
Megan Meadows and Cassandra Hooks are shown passing the July 2006 Bar examination in the movie. Donald Baumeister failed the bar for the 42nd time and Sam Garrett failed it for the third time. Magda Madrigal did not take the July 2006 exam because the State Bar determined that she had not taken enough units at Peoples College of Law, an unaccredited law school.

The movie does follow-up with the subsequent exam and says that Tricia Zunker successfully passed the February 2007 California Bar, and neither Donald Baumeister, Sam Garrett nor Magda Madrigal passed at that time.
