= The New Adelphi Club =

Music venue in Hull, East Riding of Yorkshire, England

Coordinates: 53°45′44″N 0°21′19″W

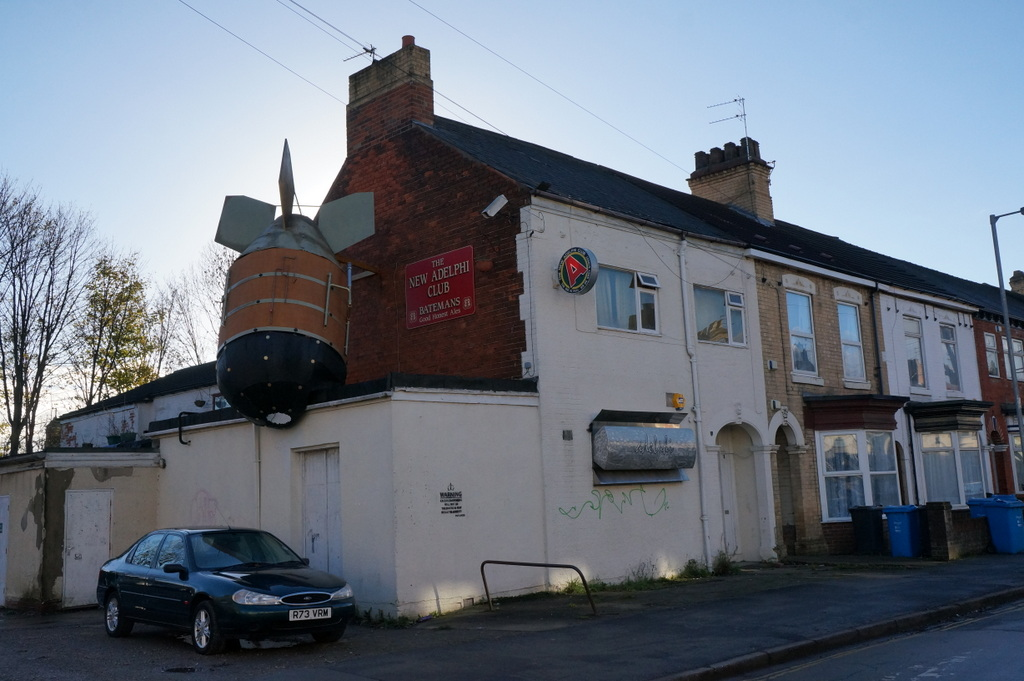
- Interactive map of The New Adelphi Club
- Address: 89 De Grey Street; Hull, East Riding of Yorkshire; England
- Owner: Paul Jackson
- Capacity: 200

Construction
- Opened: October 1984

Website
- Official website

The New Adelphi Club is a popular local venue for alternative live music in the city of Hull, East Riding of Yorkshire, England. It has achieved notability outside its local area, having hosted such bands as The Stone Roses, Radiohead, Green Day and Oasis, in its over-30 year history. The club opened in October 1984, and Kaiser Chiefs performed there as part of the 30th anniversary celebrations in 2014.

== History ==
In late 1984 the venue, which was formerly a terraced house that narrowly escaped a Luftwaffe bomb during the Blitz on Hull, and later had a spell as a working men's club, became The New Adelphi Club. Part of a Victorian residential street built in 1888 in the west of Hull, and named after the Earl de Grey and Ripon, 89 De Grey Street survived whilst the bomb scored a direct hit on a couple of adjacent properties. To this day the bomb site serves as a small car park next to the club.

The small venue has remained shabby chic, historically preserved, and idiosyncratic, but has retained a unique atmosphere as the colours of the interior walls changed from green to brown and back to green again. The club, whose owner Paul Jackson built with little resources, has hosted an broad range of national and international acts. The venue contains a front room containing a pool table, and a bar area which is featured in CAMRA's 2015 version of the Good Beer Guide. This area remains open in the evening from 8 pm, irrespective of whether there is any live entertainment taking place. The main concert room has hosted thousands of musicians over the years including those just commencing their careers such as Pulp, Green Day and Radiohead; plus local artist The Housemartins who first appeared there in 1988. Others appearing included The Stone Roses, Supergrass and Mumford & Sons. Oasis played at the Adelphi the day before the release of their first single, whilst Radiohead has played at the venue twice. Their second appearance was in 1992 around the time of their hit single, "Creep".

In 2009, a series of gigs were held, coupled with an exhibition and live performance at the Ferens Art Gallery, to celebrate the New Adelphi's silver anniversary.

In October 2014, the Kaiser Chiefs played at the New Adelphi as headline act for the venue's 30th anniversary celebration. A film capturing Kaiser Chiefs performance was made, which was shown at the Adelphi in January 2015 as part of Independent Music Venue Week. In October 2015, the film was screened at the 2015 Tucson Film & Music Festival in Arizona, United States.

Shortly afterwards, Paul Heaton and Richard Hawley both followed Kaiser Chiefs by playing at the Adelphi. In December 2015, The Bohicas performed at the venue.

In January 2016, BBC Radio 6 Music's Steve Lamacq broadcast from the studios at BBC Radio Humberside, as part of BBC Radio's Independent Music Venue Week tour. One night of the nationwide tour was hosted at the New Adelphi on 26 January 2016, with Mark Morriss as the headline act. Lach performed at the venue in March 2016.

From 2017 onwards the club was run as a community interest company, with Jackson operating as one of its directors.

Paul Jackson died on 31 March 2026, at the age of 71.

== Performances ==
Alphabetical list of notable musicians who have performed at the Adelphi over the years:

- Bert Jansch
- Dodgy
- Edgar Broughton
- First Aid Kit
- Franz Ferdinand
- Green Day
- Happy Mondays
- Inspiral Carpets
- It's a Beautiful Day
- Julie Felix
- Kaiser Chiefs
- Levellers
- Manic Street Preachers
- Mark Morriss
- Michael Chapman
- Mike Heron
- Mumford & Sons
- My Bloody Valentine
- Oasis
- Paper Aeroplanes
- Paul Heaton
- Pavement
- Primal Scream
- Pulp
- Radiohead
- Red Guitars
- Richard Hawley
- Supergrass
- The Bar-Steward Sons of Val Doonican
- The Bluetones
- The Bohicas
- The Housemartins
- The La's
- The Nightingales
- Thurston Moore
- Townes Van Zandt
