= Couch Fest Films =

International short film festival

Couch Fest Films Promo Pic

Couch Fest Films was an international festival of short films hosted in private homes and alternative locations all on one day. The annual festival, which began in 2008 in Seattle, was held worldwide on the same day. Since 2015 it is part of Shnit Worldwide Shortfilmfestival.

== History ==
Couch Fest Films is the largest single-day shorts film festival in the world. From Poland to Portland, Seattle to Slovakia, and Port-au-Prince to Peru, Couch Fest Films is a unique and cozy shorts film fest hosted in people's houses and alternative locations all over the world.

Each year Couch Fest Films presents films from such festivals as Sundance, SXSW, CFC Worldwide Shorts, Seattle Int. Film Festival, and the New Horizons Film Festival to name a few. As the mission is to bring people together with what could be considered "mind-blowing films" each year Couch Fest Films presents over 65 of the very best of current short films to a huge audience of cinephiles worldwide.

== shnit SHORTS ==
In 2015, Couch Fest Films became part of shnit SHORTS, which is a 12-day event for short films held in multiple cities around the world.

Map of Locations for Couch Fest Films 2011

== Winners ==
	Golden Couch	Silver Couch	Bronze Couch
2011	Cold Blood by Martin Thibaudeau	Suiker by Jeroen Annokkee	The Mirror by Ramon and Pedro
2010	The Surprise Demise of Francis Coopers Mother by Felix Massey	The Poodle Trainer by Vance Malone	Famous 4A by Mike Attie
2009	Prayers for Peace by Dustin Grella	OFF by Gareth O'Brien & Ben Langsfeld	Sunshine Bob by Dandy Dwarves
2008	Head Sophisticated Side Ponytail Noel Paul & Stefan Moore	Fantaisie in Bubblewrap by Arthur Metcalf	Untitled by Jarid del Deo
