= International Short Film Festival Cine a la Calle =

The International Short Film Festival Cine a la Calle (Spanish: Festival Internacional de Cortometrajes Cine a la Calle or FICICA) is a film festival dedicated to short films. Organized by the Foundation Cine a la Calle in Barranquilla, Colombia, it takes place every year by early May, featuring around 200 short films from more than 30 countries. It is considered to be the pioneer of its kind in Colombia and one of the most influential in Latin America. It boasts around 15,000 attendees annually, since 2001.The 2024 edition took place in August.
