= List of short film festivals =

List

List of short film festivals by continent.

== Asia ==
Name	Est.	City	Country
Tehran International Short Film Festival	1983	Tehran	Iran
Short Shorts Film Festival & Asia	1999	Tokyo	Japan
Kochi Metro (Malayalam) Short Film Fest	2014	Kochi	India
Minikino Film Week	2015	Bali	Indonesia
Thai Short Film and Video Festival	1997	Bangkok	Thailand
Filmfare Short Film Awards	2017	Mumbai	India

== Australia and New Zealand ==
Name	Est.	City	Country
Lost And Found Film Festival	2022	Sydney	Australia
World Monologue Film Festival	2020	Sydney	Australia
Show Me Shorts Film Festival	2006	Auckland, Wellington	New Zealand
Trasharama A-Go-Go	1997	Adelaide	Australia
Tropfest: "The World's Largest Short Film Festival"	1993	Sydney	Australia
Heathcote Film Festival	2010	Heathcote, Victoria	Australia

== Europe ==
Name	Est.	City	Country
Alpinale Short Film Festival	1985	Bludenz	Austria
Brive Film Festival, International medium-length films	2004	Brive	France
Clermont-Ferrand International Short Film Festival	1979	Clermont-Ferrand	France
Colchester Film Festival	2012	Colchester	United Kingdom
Drama International Short Film Festival	1978	Drama	Greece
Encounters Film Festival	1995	Bristol	United Kingdom
Entr'2 Marches International Film Festival	2010	Cannes	France
Fête du Court Métrage	2015	Paris	France
Friss Hús Budapest International Short Film Festival	2013	Budapest	Hungary
Glowflare Short Film Festival	2025	Beverley	United Kingdom
Go Short	2009	Nijmegen	Netherlands
Ibero-American Festival of Short films ABC (FIBABC)	2010	Madrid	Spain
La Boca del Lobo International Short Film Festival	1998	Madrid	Spain
Insight Film Festival	2007	Manchester	United Kingdom
International Cycling Film Festival	2005	Herne	Germany
International Short Film Festival Oberhausen	1954	Oberhausen	Germany
Küstendorf International Film and Music Festival	2008	Drvengrad	Serbia
Kyiv International Short Film Festival	2011	Kyiv	Ukraine
Odense International Film Festival	1975	Odense	Denmark
ShortCutz Amsterdam	2013	Amsterdam	Netherlands
Tampere Film Festival	1969	Tampere	Finland
Uppsala International Short Film Festival	1982	Uppsala	Sweden
Vienna Independent Shorts	2004	Vienna	Austria
Sedicicorto International Film Festival	2004	Forlì	Italy
Wiz-Art	2008	Lviv	Ukraine

== North America ==
Name	Est.	City	Country
24FPS International Short Film Festival	1999	Abilene, Texas	United States
Los Angeles International Short Film Festival	1997	Los Angeles	United States
Macabre Faire Film Festival	2012	Long Island	United States
Miami Short Film Festival	2002	Miami	United States
New Media Film Festival	2009	Los Angeles	United States
Palm Springs International Shortfest	1989	Palm Springs	United States
CFC Worldwide Short Film Festival	1994	Toronto	Canada
Reel Shorts Film Festival	2007	Grande Prairie, Alberta	Canada
Yorkton Film Festival	1947	Yorkton	Canada
DC Shorts Film Festival	2003	Washington D.C.	United States
Aspen Shortsfest	1991	Aspen	United States
PBS Short Film Festival	2012	Washington D.C. (and online)	United States
Short Sweet Film Fest	2012	Cleveland, OH	United States

== South America ==
Name	Est.	City	Country
FICICA: International Short Film Festival Cine a la Calle	2001	Barranquilla	Colombia

== Online and/or Worldwide ==
Name	Est.
Couch Fest Films	2008
