= Gideon Freudmann =

American cellist

Gideon Freudmann, is a composer, performer and cello innovator. He coined the term CelloBop to describe his music. His solo performances often include improvisation and the use of technology to sample, loop and layer tracks in real time to create music that is creative and compelling.

Gideon Freudmann enjoys an international reputation for his innovative compositions and unique approach. He has been on the forefront of modern creative expansion of the cello and his music is familiar, fresh, and richly detailed. His compositions are heard on television soundtracks and as a contributor to NPR's All Things Considered, This American Life. Gideon is also a TEDtalk speaker . The Boston Globe said of him, "Taking a modern artist's approach to the four-stringed instrument, Gideon Freudmann has brought the cello to a new realm."

Freudmann's compositions appeared in 12 episodes of Weeds and has been placed in several independent films including the Sundance Documentary Film winner, Buck. His music also appeared in Moving On starring Lily Tomlin and Jane Fonda.

Freudmann has released 13 solo CDs as well as several albums featuring ensembles and duets. He has published several sheet music ensembles for cello trios, quartets and quintets. He is a founding member and composer for The Portland Cello Project, Caravan Gogh and King Tide Trio.

The short film, Denmark, based on Freudmann's composition of the same name has won numerous international awards including Park City Film Music Festival, “2011 Winner Gold Medal for Excellence.”, Poppy Jasper Film Festival, “2012 Winner Festival Prize. Best Drama.”, Canada International Film Festival, “winner- Royal Reel Award... 2011”, Radar Hamburg International Independent Film Festival and Los Angeles Cinema of Hollywood, “winner- Best Music Video” and UK Film Festival, “winner- Best Short Film”

Freudmann performs live soundtracks for classic silent films with a focus on Buster Keaton comedies and German Expressionist films such as The Cabinet of Dr Caligari and Phantom of the Opera. He also performs and composes music for dance companies including the internationally acclaimed Project Bandaloop. He has composed music for several short films and the feature-length movie, Clocking The T.

Gideon Freudmann tours throughout the United States and has performed in Europe, Australia and Asia. Originally from New England, he now resides in the Pacific Northwest.

== Discography ==
- Holiday Clocks (1987)
- Fellini's Martini (1993)
- Cellobotomy (1995)
- Banking Left (1995)
- Adobe Dog House (1997)
- Sound of Distant Deer (1998)
- Hologram Crackers (1999)
- More Batteries (2001)
- Ukrainian Pajama Party (2001)
- More Batteries (2001)
- Dancing On My Hat (2002)
- CelloTales (2004)
- Ghost in the Attic (2005)
- The Cabinet of Dr Caligari (2006)
- Caravan Gogh (2007)
- The Cabinet of Doctor Caligari DVD (2008)
- Sonic Surf (2008)
- 7 in the Afternoon (2011)
- Cello Shots (2011)
- Rain Monsters (2012)
- The 3 Faces of Steve (2014)
- Magnetic West (2015)
- Spring Breakup (2017)
- Unraveling (2017)
- Sasquatch (2020)
- Flying Cars (2022)
- Trio Quartetto (2024)
- King Tide Trio (2025)
- All The Rage (2025)
- Sherlock Jr (2022)

== Filmography ==
- Moving On (2023)
- An American Farmer (2020)
- Clocking The T (2018)
- La Escuela Del Crimen (2018)
- Agnes Martin Before The Grid (2018)
- Poison (2015)
- Tashi’s Turbine (2015)
- Weeds (TV - 12 Episodes) (2007–2012)
- Denmark (2011)
- Buck (2011)
- The Unfortunate Gift (2011)
- Of the Air of the Earth (2008)

Silent Film Soundtracks:

- Nosferatu
- The General
- The Cabinet of Doctor Caligari
- Sherlock Jr
- Metropolis
- Phantom Of The Opera
- Pandora’s Box
- Downhill (Hitchcock)
- Steamboat Bill, Jr
- College
- Woman in the Moon

Radio Programming:

- This American Life
- All Thing Considered
- Car Talk

== Sheet Music ==
Cello Ensembles

- Denmark (cello quintet)
- Robin Hood Changes His Oil (cello quintet)
- Indigo Blue (cello quintet)
- Fiddler on a Hot Tin Roof (cello quintet)
- Vertigogh (cello quartet)
- Equinox (cello quintet)
- Dance of the Seahorse (cello quartet)
- Manila Waltz (cello quartet)
- Midnight Moon (cello quintet)
- Princess Mortuba (cello quartet)
- Blue Stew (cello solo)
- Wind and Snow (cello quintet)
- Lilia's 3-Step (cello quartet)
- Nine (cello quartet)
- Ice cave (cello quartet)
- Home (cello quartet)
- Blue Cello (cello trio)
- CelloBop Book 1 (cello solo, duo, trio)

String Trios

- Morning Blues (string trio)
- New Toy (string trio)
- Nebula (string trio)
- Music for a Found Harmonium (string trio)
- Bach Prelude (string trio)
- Blackbird (string trio)
- Charlie The Chaplain (string trio)
- Cow Buoy (string trio)
- Descender (string trio)
- Chopin Prelude (string trio)
- Sketch (string trio)
- Ampico (string trio)
- Frank's Grandson (string trio)
- Carnival (string trio)
- Flying cars (string trio)
- Temporal Cowboy (string trio)
- Bog (string trio)
- Melodica Rubato (string trio)
- King Tide (string trio)
- Only You (string trio)
- Hoedown (string trio)
- Nebula (string trio)

== See also ==
- Cello rock
- Mortal City
