= Norfolk & Western (band) =

American indie and folk rock band

- Origin: Portland, Oregon, U.S.
- Genres: Indie rock
- Years active: 1999–present
- Labels: Hush, Filmguerrero
- Members: Adam Selzer; Rachel Blumberg; Tony Moreno; Amanda Lawrence; Dave Depper; Cory Gray; Peter Broderick
- Website: www.norfolkandwestern.org

Norfolk & Western is an American indie rock and folk/rock band from Portland, Oregon, United States.

Norfolk and Western began as the recording project of Adam Selzer with friends, including M. Ward, playing various instruments, and evolved over time to become a fully orchestrated band. Their live shows often feature band members switching instruments, sometimes even mid-song, as well as film accompaniment.

Norfolk and Western toured in support of the release A Gilded Age in Spring and Summer of 2006.

== Members ==
=== Current members ===
- Adam Selzer (band founder, songwriter, guitar, lead vocals, found sounds, engineer, producer, and other instruments)
- Rachel Blumberg (drums, keyboards, backing vocals, vibraphone, percussion, and other instruments)

=== Rotating members ===
- Tony Moreno (guitar, banjo, accordion, found sounds, sound collage, film)
- Amanda Lawrence (viola, glockenspiel)
- Dave Depper (bass, vocals, piano)
- Cory Gray (trumpet, piano, Wurlitzer)

=== Former members ===
- Peter Broderick (violin, banjo, saw, mandolin, theremin, accordion, lap steel, guitar). Joined Efterklang.

== The members ==
=== Adam Selzer ===
Adam owns and operates Type Foundry Recording Studio in Portland, Oregon, where he has engineered and produced records by such artists as M.Ward, the Decemberists, Little Wings, She & Him, Corrina Repp, Shelley Short, and many more. He is a member of the band Alialujah Choir and also tours with M. Ward playing guitar and bass.

=== Rachel Blumberg ===
Rachel Blumberg has been a long-time songwriting collaborator and has written many songs of her own which appear on the Norfolk and Western recordings. Blumberg has also toured and recorded with M. Ward playing the drums and ukulele. She was formerly the drummer of the Decemberists and has toured with Laura Veirs.

=== Dave Depper ===
Originally from Bend, Oregon, Dave Depper has perfect pitch. He also played in the Village Green and Blanket Music.

=== Tony Moreno ===
Tony Moreno became a father and has been playing in the band since the inception. Moreno has recorded on his own under his name with several releases. He has also designed websites, including NorfolkAndWestern.org.

=== Amanda Lawrence ===
Amanda Lawrence teaches violin, viola, and cello and is a studio session player. She also plays in the band Pentecost Hotel.

=== Cory Gray ===
Cory Gray has been a fixture at Type Foundry Recording Studio as a session piano and trumpet player. He first made his mark in Norfolk on the Dusk in Cold Parlours CD. He leads his own band Carcrashlander and plays with various other bands such as Graves and occasionally tours and records with Darren Hanlon. He also played in the band Desert City Soundtrack.

=== Peter Broderick ===
Peter Broderick left the band to join the Danish band, Efterklang. Contributed to A Gilded Age. He has also played in the bands Loch Lomond and Horse Feathers.

== Discography ==
- Dinero Severo (2009)
- The Unsung Colony - Released on Hush Records. 24, October 2006. The album was made available for purchase on the Hush Records site before the official release date at the beginning of October.
- A Gilded Age - Released on Hush Records. 2006.
- Dusk in Cold Parlours - Released on Hush Records. 2003
- Winter Farewell - Released on Filmguerrero. 2002.
- Centralia - Released on Filmguerrero. 2000. Out of Print.
