= The Portland Cello Project =

Portland Cello Project
- Origin: Portland, Oregon, United States
- Genres: Folk, Indie Rock, Indie Pop, Pop Music, Heavy Metal, Alternative Rock, Classical Music, Crossover Music, Jazz, Hip Hop
- Years active: 2006–present
- Label: Kill Rock Stars
- Website: portlandcelloproject.com

The Portland Cello Project is a collective of cello players in Portland, Oregon who have been performing since October 2006.

== History ==
For almost a year, the group performed ambiguously under the names "Celli" and "Cellodarity" and eventually, exclusively "The Portland Cello Project."

Originally started by Tony Rogers, the first rehearsal took place at the Musicians Union in Portland, Oregon on August 16, 2006. Present at the rehearsal were Tony Rogers, Gideon Freudmann, Zoe Keating, Douglas Jenkins, and Jenette Mackie. Also invited to that first rehearsal were Justin Kagan, Todd Bayles, Skip vonKuske, Adam Hurst, and Noah Seitz.

The first performance of the group was at The Doug Fir Lounge in Portland, Oregon on Sunday October 15, 2006.

The management and artistic direction responsibilities of the group were split between cellists Tony Rogers and Douglas Jenkins, until mid-2007 when Rogers left Portland for West Virginia. July 1, 2007 was Rogers last official show with the group at The Doug Fir Lounge. At this performance, the group surprised Rogers by dedicating to him a cover of John Denver's "Take Me Home Country Roads" with special guest Holcombe Waller singing.

After Rogers' departure, Jenkins became the exclusive general manager and artistic director of the group. Jenkins also produced all of the recordings the group has released.

In 2009 the group signed to a one-record deal with Kill Rock Stars, becoming the first and only cello ensemble on the record label.

From 2009–10 the group had external management from Ingrid Renan and Slim Moon of Shotclock Management. In 2009 the group was added to the roster of The Billions Booking Agency, under Mary Brabec, who continues to work with them today.

In 2012, the group recorded and released the songs from Beck's project, Song Reader, with guest singers.

== Philosophy ==
While the goals of the group have evolved over the years, the group's current philosophy as stated on their website is:

1. "To bring the cello to places you wouldn't normally hear it."
2. "To play music on the cello you wouldn't normally hear played on the instrument."
3. "To build bridges across all musical communities by bringing a diverse assortment of musical collaborators on stage with them."

== Touring ==
The group's first tour was as main support for Buckethead on his west coast USA tour in December 2008. In spring 2009, the group toured as main support for Alexi Murdoch, also on the west coast. The group's first national US and Canadian tour was with Thao with the Get Down Stay Down in fall 2009.

Since 2009 the group has gone on numerous headlining tours, and played a wide variety of venues, from punk clubs like Dempsey's in Fargo, North Dakota, to the Bowery Ballroom in New York City, to concert halls like the Alaska Center for the Performing Arts and Millennium Park in Chicago.

== Collaborations ==
As part of the group's philosophy to build bridges across music communities, the group includes musical collaborators on almost every show. The group's first collaborations with non-cellists were with Laura Gibson and Peter Broderick on Thursday May 24, 2007, at the Holocene nightclub in Portland, Oregon.

Musicians the group has collaborated with include: Peter Yarrow, The Corin Tucker Band, Eric Bachmann, The Dandy Warhols, Storm Large, Dan Bern, Mirah, Thao with the Get Down Stay Down, Justin Power, Weinland, The Builders and the Butchers, Sallie Ford and the Sound Outside, Horse Feathers, Holcombe Waller, Shenandoah Davis, Kaylee Cole, The 1900s, Emily Wells, and many others.

== Repertoire ==
The group's repertoire contains a wide variety of music, from classical pieces and movie themes, to jazz standards, to pop music covers and hip-hop. The group tries to perform an entirely new program on every series of performances. Almost all of the music performed by The Portland Cello Project is arranged by members of the group. The majority of the arrangements are written by Douglas Jenkins. Kevin Jackson and Skip vonKuske also contribute arrangements to the group.

== Discography ==
- Limited Edition EP (2008 self released)
- Self-Titled (2008 self released)
- The Thao and Justin Power Sessions (2009 Kill Rock Stars)
- The Justin Timberlake Covers (2009 self released, digital only)
- Thousand Words (2010 self released)
- The Kanye West and Rihanna Covers Single (2011 Kill Rock Stars, Digital Only)
- Portland Cello Project Play Beck Hansen's Song Reader (2012 self released)
- Homage (2012 self released)
- Winter (The Best Nine Months of the Year) (2013 self released)
- to e.s (2014 self released)
- Homage to Radiohead (2019 self released)

== Film ==
- Denmark
- A House, A Home

== Members ==
The group has a revolving cast, depending on who is available for performances and touring. Performing cellists include or have included: Diane Chaplin, Skip vonKuske, Gideon Freudmann, Kevin Jackson, Douglas Jenkins, Lauren McShane, Julian Kosanovic, Sage Coy, Heather Blackburn, Justin Kagan, David Eby, Collin Oldham, Anna Fritz, M Allegra Sauvage, Sonja Myklebust, Galen Cohen, Ashia Grzesik, Samantha Kushnick, Robert Brooks, Brian Bruner, Emma Wood, Melissa Bach, Sarah Young, Tony Rogers, Heather Broderick, Jessie Dettwiler, Erin Winemiller, Jenette Mackie, and Noah Seitz.

Increasingly the group incorporates other instruments as part of their regular line up. Their regular percussionist is Tyrone Hendrix. Other drummers have included Matthew Berger, John Vecchiarelli, and Rachel Blumberg. Brass and Woodwind players have included: John Whaley, Teagen Andrews, Jen Harrison, Jourdan Paul, Jill Coykendall, Leander Star, and Elise Blatchford.

== See also ==
- Culture of Portland, Oregon
