= Keen (shoe company) =

American shoe company

Keen, Inc.
- Type: Private
- Industry: Footwear
- Founded: Alameda, California, U.S. (2003; 23 years ago)
- Headquarters: Portland, Oregon, U.S. 45.5267°N 122.6846°W
- Key people: Martin Keen, Rory Fuerst
- Products: Shoes, boots, clothing, bags
- Revenue: (est) $240 million (2011)
- Number of employees: 300
- Website: keenfootwear.com

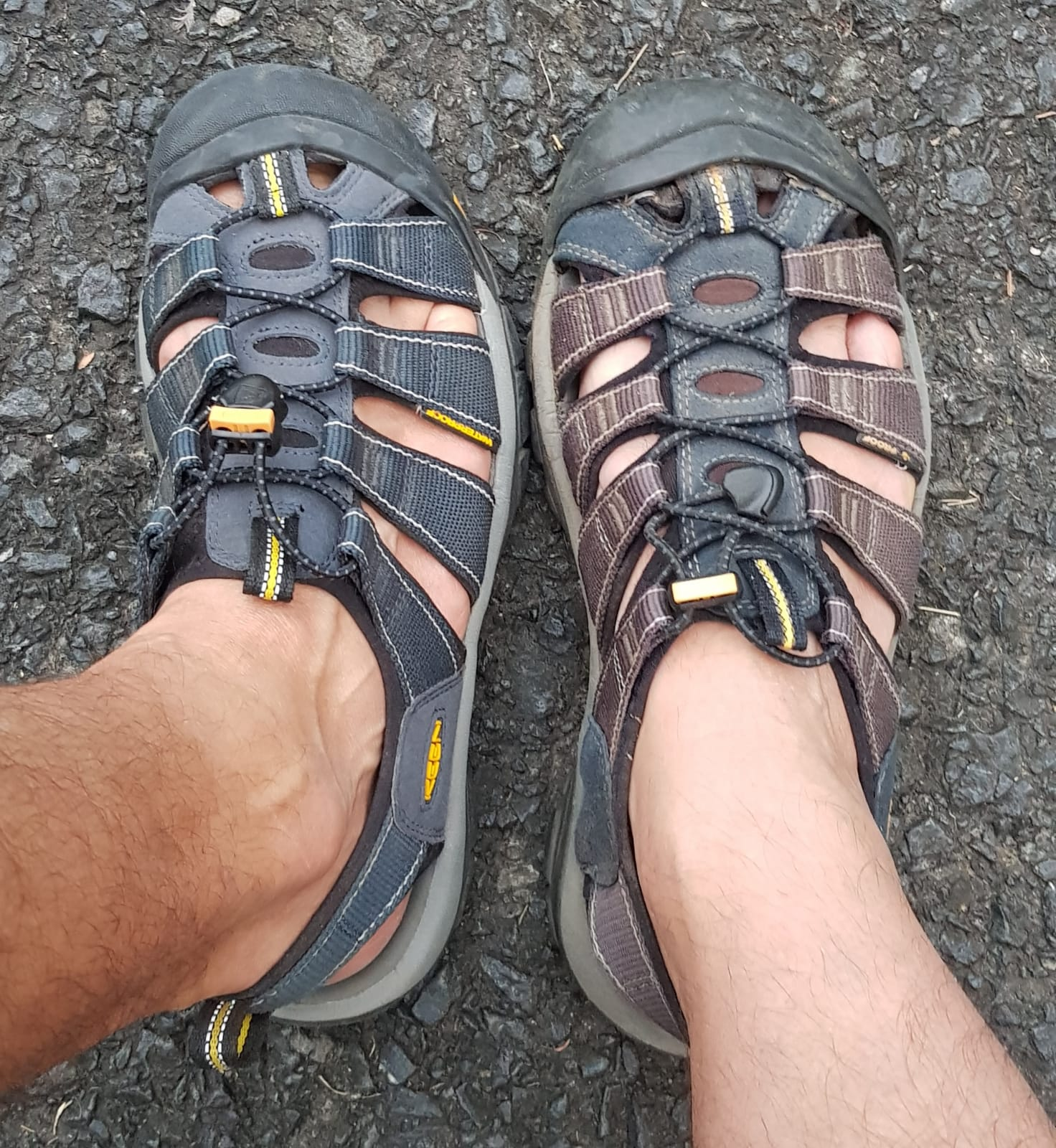
Keen Newport shoes. New one on the left, 10 years old on the right.

Keen (stylized KEEN) is an American footwear and accessories company based in Portland, Oregon. It was founded in 2003 by Martin Keen and Rory Fuerst. The company's products are sold in retail locations throughout the domestic American market and also are distributed worldwide.

== History ==
What eventually became known as the Newport Sandal, was invented in 1999 by Martin Keen in Jamestown, Rhode Island. In 2003, the first Keen sandals and shoes were put into production and feature a protective black toe bumper. Keen initially found a niche market in sailing and other outdoor and water activities, and offered products for many outdoor activities as well as lifestyle shoes. It later expanded to a variety of styles, casual and cold-weather footwear, bags, and clothing, including safety work footwear, such as the Keen Utility Tacoma work boots.

Keen has been a fast-growing company since its inception. Footwear News named the company 2003's "Launch of the Year". In 2009, the company had estimated sales of $130 to $140 million, and for 2011, revenue had grown to approximately $240 million.

In reaction to the 2004 Indian Ocean tsunami, Keen joined the relief effort by pulling their $1M advertising budget and diverting it to disaster relief. This gesture turned into their long-term Hybrid.Care program, where they partner with organizations whose vision they share, including The Conservation Alliance, 1 KG More, Leave No Trace, and Big City Mountaineers. Keen Utility, through its non-profit partnerships within the Project Build program, has helped veterans, provided protective footwear for those in need, and supported conservation corps work across the country.

In early 2006, the company relocated its headquarters from Alameda, California, to a restored five-story building in Portland, Oregon, located in the historic Pearl District. The company opened a plant in Portland in 2010 to begin manufacturing some footwear in the United States using materials sourced from around the world. Keen's footwear factory is less than five minutes from the Keen headquarters in downtown Portland, which is where their American Built collection is made. In 2012, Keen purchased the HQ Building in Portland's Pearl District for $10.8 million to serve as company headquarters and also host their retail store. They re-purposed almost all existing materials within the old building, and the renovation was completed with less than one dumpster of waste instead of the normal 20-25 if approached the typical way.

== See also ==
- List of companies based in Oregon
