= Project Twenty1 =

Project Twenty1 is a 501(c)3 not-for-profit organization based in Philadelphia with the mission to Educate, Promote, Inspire & Connect creatives through film and animation programs (E.P.I.C.) Signature programs include the 21-Day Filmmaking Competition and the Philadelphia Film & Animation Festival. Past Philadelphia programs they have run include the Philadelphia Film-A-Thon, an all day international film marathon and Cinema Undercover, a secret cinema showcase of films that are not revealed before the screening.

The organization has also run satellite events and programs outside of Philadelphia. In Norristown, Project Twenty1 helped co-found The Norristown Arts Hill District, which runs along DeKalb Street (from Front Street to Chestnut Street) and along Main Street (between Swede Street and DeKalb). From there the organization launched Norristown Movies from the Hill, a free outdoor screening series of family-friendly independent short films.

The organization was founded in 2006 by writer/producer Stephanie Yuhas, writer/filmmaker Matt Conant, and actor/musician Quang Ly. Past judges and guest hosts have been Joel Hodgson, James Rolfe, Aaron Parry, Jeffrey D. Erb, and Jon Douglas Rainey.

== 21-Day Filmmaking Competition ==
The competition is one of many international time-based film competitions, such as the 48 Hour Film Project, Extremefilmmaker's 48 Hour Film Festival, 72 Hour Feature Project, and 168 Hour Film Project.

Teams of filmmakers and animators have 21-Days to create an original film containing a secret "Element." Past Elements have been "21," "Light," "Key," "Between the Lines," "Start with a Crash," "Jump," and "Cell."

== See also ==
- Film festival
- List of film festivals in North and Central America
- List of film festivals
