= Tucson Film & Music Festival =

Annual event in Tucson, Arizona

Tucson Film Festival
- Location: Tucson, Arizona, United States
- Language: International
- Website: Official website

Tucson Film Festival celebrates the past, present and future of the Tucson, Arizona music and filmmaking scene. TFF's focus is on music-related content, as well as films and filmmakers with a connection to Arizona or the Southwest. The festival accepts documentaries, narrative features, shorts, and music videos.

The Tucson Film Festival launched in 2005, with a screening of the Tucson music documentary High and Dry, and the 20th anniversary of the Club Congress, the long-running nightclub west of the Mississippi. Over 40 local bands, many of whom were reuniting for the first time in years, played the Labor Day weekend festivities and the new festival was born.

They accept features, shorts and music video submissions with an emphasis on documentaries and music-related content, as well as films and filmmakers with a connection to Arizona or the Southwest. Any feature, short or music video needs to have been made within the last two years in order to be accepted. The festival is an international festival and accepts films from all over the world.

Any feature, short film or video, made for cinema, television or the Internet may be entered. Feature films must be longer than 50 minutes in length. Short films must be no more than 20 minutes in length. However, based on the films' content and quality, some films over 20 minutes in length have been accepted to the festival in the past. Music videos less than 10 minutes in length can be commissioned or non-commissioned (spec) works. All submitted works must be in English or have English subtitles. A film capturing Kaiser Chiefs performance at The New Adelphi Club in Kingston upon Hull, East Yorkshire, England, in January 2015, as part of Independent Music Venue Week, was screened at the 2015 Tucson Film & Music Festival.

The festival accepts submissions online through sonicbids.com and withoutabox.com. They also have mail-in entries available on their website.

The festival is directed by Michael Toubassi from Upstairs Film. The office for the Tucson Film Festival is located in Hollywood, California.

Venues of The Tucson Film Festival include The Loft Cinema, Plush, La Placita Cinema, The Hut, The Rialto Theater, and Grand Cinema Crossroads. Other sponsors include the Tucson Film Office, Hanson Film Institute, Upstairs Film, KLPX Radio, KFMA Radio, and Hype.
