= Weinland (band) =

American musician

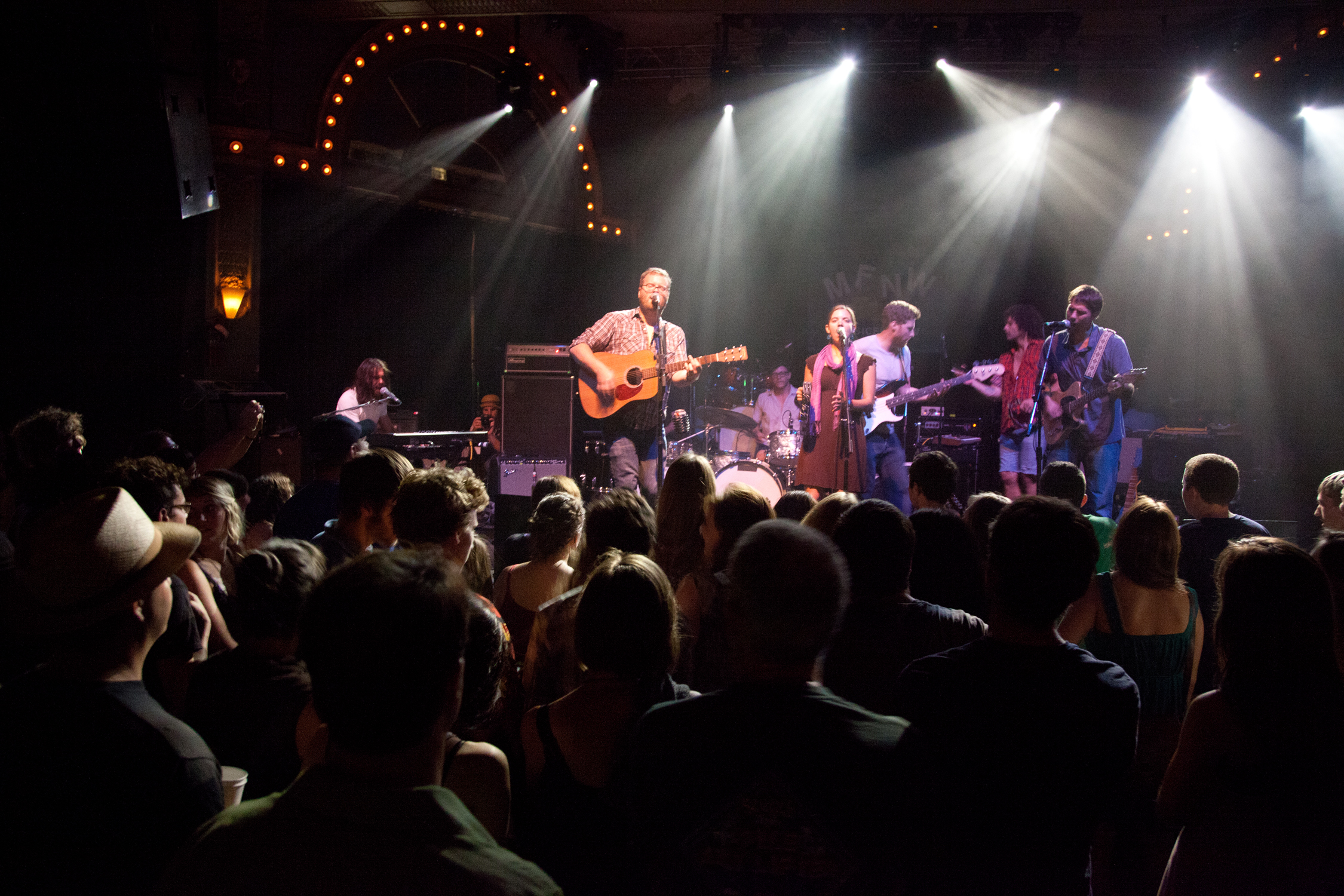

Background information
- Origin: Portland, Oregon
- Genres: Indie rock, folk rock, funeral folk, art rock, alternative rock, alt-country, progressive rock
- Years active: 2006–present
- Labels: Badman, Jealous Butcher, Wood Phone
- Members: John Adam Weinland Shearer; Rory Brown; Paul Christensen; Aaron Pomerantz; Ian Lyles; Alia Farah
- Website: www.weinlandmusic.com www.alialujah.com

Adam Shearer born John Adam Weinland Shearer and better known by his band and recording name John Weinland or Weinland is an American singer-songwriter. Shearer has released four studio albums and is also a member of the band Alialujah Choir.

== Beginnings ==
Born in Kalispell, Montana Shearer grew up in a musical family. His dad taught guitar lessons and his mom who studied music at college, played organ at the local church. With only two radio stations in Kalispell, a classic rock and country stations, Shearer's parents were the first to introduce Adam to the music of Neil Young, Cat Stevens and other folk influences. In 1998 Shearer moved to Portland, Oregon to study psychology at Lewis and Clark College. After graduating in 2001, Shearer began writing and performing songs under the name John Weinland. Using a makeshift home studio in 2003/2004 Shearer recorded a series of songs that he pressed to vinyl and sold at Portland shows.

In 2005 Aaron Pomerantz (dobro/mandolin) and Rory Brown (bass) joined Shearer and took John Weinland from a solo project to a trio. The following year additional musicians joined the band and in 2006 Shearer recorded his first studio album Demersville.

== Weinland albums ==
=== Demersville (2006) ===
Released on July 4, 2006, Demersville was recorded at Portland's Type Foundry and was produced by John Weinland and Adam Selzer. In addition to Aaron Pomerantz (dobro, mandolin, harmony vocals) and Rory Brown (bass); Ian Lyles played drums and banjo on the Demersville album and later became the primary drummer for Weinland.

For the Demersville sessions Shearer also recruited Alia Farah to play piano on Piles of Clothes, The Letters, In Which Case, From a Town You Left. Rachel Blumberg of The Decemberists, Norfolk & Western, M. Ward and Bright Eyes sang harmony vocals on The Letters, In Which Case. Adam Selzer of Norfolk & Western and M Ward played electric guitar on From a Town You Left and harmonica on The Letters. Two other musicians who contributed to the Demersville album are Jesse Richter and Katie O'Brian of Dolorean and The Corin Tucker Band. Richter played pedal Steel guitar on Other Folks and O'Brian played violin and cello on Piles of Clothes, Young and Smart, Scene 30.

On July 14, 2006, John Weinland played a sold-out show at Mississippi Studios which included Paul Christensen on keyboards. After the show the Willamette Week referred to Shearer as one of the strongest young songwriters in Portland.The Portland Mercury called Demersville "...an amazing & intimate collection of hauntingly beautiful folk lullabies." Positive editorial support continued to follow John Weinland and the band continued to grow in numbers.

=== La Lamentor (2008) ===
With the addition of Ian Lyles (drums) and Paul Christensen (keyboards), Shearer wanted to distance himself from the solo origin of John Weinland and foster a band-like ambiance. For La Lamentor he omitted John and changed the band's name to Weinland.

In 2007 from February to September La Lamentor was recorded in four sessions at Portland's Type Foundry Studios. The first session was overseen by Adam Selzer and created three songs Gold, All To Yourself, Desiree. The second session was produced by Dylan Maglerek, the founder of Badman Records. Shearer wanted to work with Maglerek on Weinland's acoustic songs because he was a fan of the Mark Kozelek recordings Maglerek produced. Weinland recorded three songs with Maglerek God Here I Come, For Land For Love For Time, Curse of The Sea. Weinland's session with Maglerek also gave La Lamentor a home. A few hours after the initial recording session Maglerek played a rough mix of God Here I Come for his wife. After hearing the song she told Maglerek he had to sign Weinland to the Badman label.

The recording process for La Lamentor was a departure for Shearer. In a 2008 interview he stated, "The process was very different from what we've done in the past, many of the songs weren't written before we entered the studio. I ended up writing a lot of lyrics and melodies as we went. For a lot of the songs I would sit down and record the guitar parts and then the vocals. Then as a band we would just start throwing instrumentation at the songs until they felt real."

The third session was back in Selzer's hands and produced four more songs La Lamentor, Sick As A Gun, The Devil in Me, In This The End. For the fourth session Weinland worked again with Maglerek to refine and finish the song With You, Without You.

La Lamentor was released by Badman on March 4, 2008. The album received positive reviews and was included on a number of best album lists. Weinland toured in 2008 to support the album and contributed to three compilation albums. Alongside Laura Veirs, M. Ward, Loch Lomond, Adam Selzer and other Pacific Northwest artists Weinland recorded Hey Hey What Can I Do for a Led Zeppelin tribute LP. Weinland performed a song for a live compilation by Mississippi Studios featuring Feist and Regina Spektor and their song Gold was included on the self-titled Portland Cello Project album. Gold and Hey Hey What Can I Do played on NPR Music's All Songs Considered. Weinland was also a 2008 guest on Daytrotter.

=== Breaks in the Sun (2009) ===
For Weinland's third studio album the band arrived at Type Foundry without one completed song. Over the course of 17 consecutive days, with Adam Selzer producing, Weinland wrote and recorded eleven songs. Shearer wanted to create an environment that could produce the energy and beautiful moments that happen when a band performs a song for the first time.

A recurring observation by music critics was Breaks in the Sun delivered more hopeful songs. Shearer worked at a mental health facility helping at risk kids when he wrote the songs for Demersville and La Lamentor. He left his job to concentrate full-time on music at the same time he was writing for the 2007 La Lamentor sessions. In a 2009 interview with Paste Shearer commented on how environment influenced his writing, "I'd seen a lot of really traumatic things happen there: cutting someone out of a coat closet after hanging themself, saving a kid who fired off a fire extinguisher in his mouth and tried to leap out a glass window. I came home after that day and tried to play my guitar and got so freaked out in purging the experience, I knocked a corner off the headstock; it left that guitar scarred. So I guess I had a lot of meaningful but short lived relationships with people, by definition—the longer I got to know them, the less successful I was at what I was supposed to be doing. I was in a really weird place, and I never noticed it when we were recording (La Lementor), but I noticed it later, and really notice it now. "

Three tracks from Breaks in the Sun I Feel Wasted, Breaks in the Sun, People Like You appeared in MTV's the World of Jenks and Sunken Eyes appeared in the feature-length film Cherry.

== Discography ==
=== self-released and studio albums ===
Name	Label	Year
John Weinland Vinyl (home recording printed 250 vinyl)	self-released	2006
Demersville	Badman	2006
La Lamentor	Badman	2008
Breaks in the Sun	Badman	2009
Alialujah Choir	Jealous Butcher Records/Woodphone Records	2012
Los Processaur	Jealous Butcher Records/Woodphone Records	2012

=== album appearances ===
Name	Label	Year
Portland Cello Project (Gold)	Portland Cello Project	2008
Dearly Departed (A House, A Home)	K Wheel Records	2008
Dinero Sivero – Norfolk & Western (So That's How It Is)	Three Syllables Records	2010
From the Land of Ice and Snow (Hey Hey What Can I Do)	Jealous Butcher Records	2010
