= Holcombe Waller =

American singer-songwriter

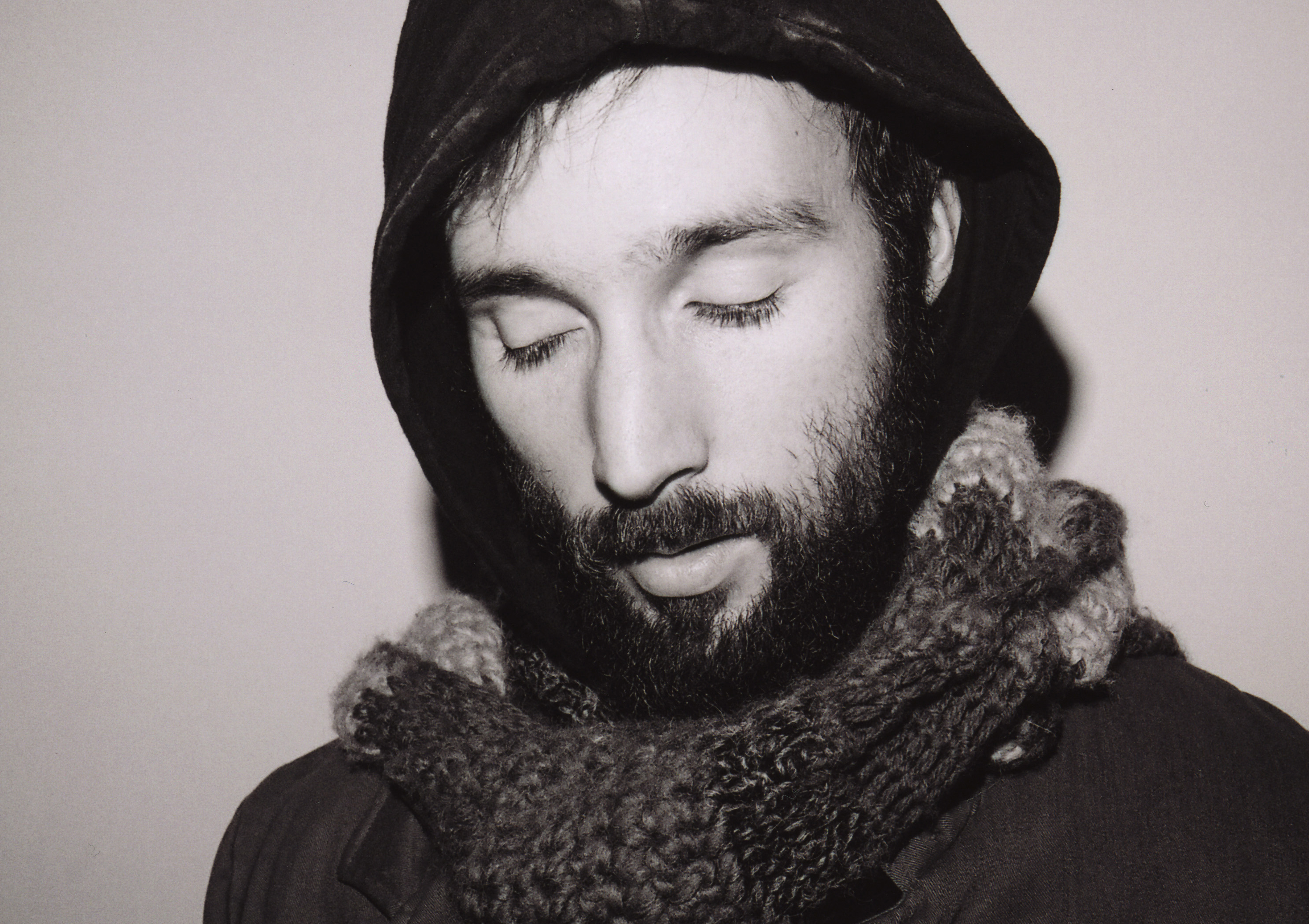

Background information
- Born: May 20, 1975
- Origin: Stanford, California, United States
- Genres: Indie folk Baroque pop Alternative
- Instruments: Vocals guitar bass guitar piano
- Years active: 1998–present
- Label: Napoleon Records
- Website: http://www.holcombewaller.com

Holcombe Waller is an American composer, singer and performance artist. Waller has self-released three albums of varying styles. His work first received international attention with his 2001 album Extravagant Gesture. The indie album was lauded by a Spin Magazine review, and in REVOLVER Magazine Ann Powers wrote, "For melodic sweep, the prize goes to Holcombe Waller, whose self-released Extravagant Gesture is a small pop epic." Waller's pop influences shifted towards folk for his 2005 release, Troubled Times. The work continued to receive broad critical attention including a positive review in Paste Magazine and a large editorial feature in BUTT Magazine.

== See also ==
- List of LGBTQ people from Portland, Oregon
