= Park City International Music Festival =

Classical music festival in Utah, United States

The Park City International Music Festival is Utah's oldest classical music festival. In 2012 the Festival name was changed to the Beethoven Festival Park City, though the Festival still reserves the right to use Park City International Music Festival as its name if it chooses.

The Beethoven Festival is a series of four seasonal festivals - the summer festival being the longest. During any given year the Festival will present over 30 public concerts. Founded as the Deer Valley Music Festival in 1983, the Festival is centered on bringing classical solo artists together to perform chamber music. In addition, the Park City Music Festival sometimes includes chamber orchestra performances by the Sonolumina Chamber Orchestra, live performances with silent film, and jazz concerts. For twelve years the Festival also included the Park City Young Artist Institute, a training ground for aspiring young artists from around the world. For a number of years the Festival also included the BRAVO Program for beginning and intermediate young musicians. The Park City International Music Festival has also been known as the Park City & SLC Music Festival in recent years since it expanded to perform in the Salt Lake City area as well.

The Festival was founded by violist Leslie Harlow and is directed by Harlow and clarinetist Russell Harlow.

The Park City International Music Festival performs in Park City, Utah, in several venues including the Park City Community Church, Temple Har Shalom, Park City's City Park, in private homes and in galleries. In Salt Lake City, the Festival performs at the Public Library and other venues including Libby Gardner Concert Hall on the University of Utah campus and at the Rose Wagner Performing Arts Center. At various times the Festival also presents Salon concerts and "Beethoven Brunches" in private homes.
