= Rutgers Film Co-op/New Jersey Media Arts Center =

Coordinates: 40.483272°N 74.437281°W

The Rutgers Film Co-op/New Jersey Media Arts Center is a film society established in 1982 and based at Rutgers University in New Brunswick, New Jersey.

The Rutgers Film Co-op/NJMAC presents year-round programming, including two festivals, which screen classic, independent, international, and experimental films and videos and often include discussions with filmmakers, performers, screenwriters and production crews.

Festivals are organised in conjunction with the Cinema Studies program at Rutgers. Events have taken place at College Avenue Campus at the Voorhees Hall, Scott Hall, Zimmerli Art Museum, as well as the State Theatre and Crossroads Theatre.

== New Jersey Film Festival ==
The New Jersey Film Festival, founded in 1982, is juried film competition and ongoing public film series devoted to "experimental, offbeat and influential cinema".

== United States Super 8mm Film + Digital Video Festival ==
The United States Super 8mm Film + Digital Video Festival, established in 1988, takes place annually is the longest running Super 8mm festival in the US.

== Founder ==
The founder, executive director, and curator of the Rutgers Film Co-op/New Jersey Media Arts Center is Albert Gabriel Nigrin, a filmmaker and cinema studies lecturer at Rutgers. He was born (circa 1959) in Charlottesville, Virginia. He received a Bachelor of Arts from Binghamton University, a Master of Fine Arts in Visual Arts/Film and Video, and a Master of Arts in French Literature from Rutgers University. Nigrin has received fellowships from the National Endowment for the Arts, the American Film Institute Mid-Atlantic Media Arts Fellowship Program and the Ford Foundation, and a 2002 New Jersey State Council on the Arts Media Arts Fellowship.

== See also ==
- Television and film in New Jersey
- List of film festivals in New Jersey
- New Jersey Motion Picture & Television Commission
- Rutgers Filmmaking Center
