= Beach (surname) =

Beach is a surname. It may refer to:

- Adam Beach (born 1972), Canadian actor
- Alfred Ely Beach (1826–1896), inventor and publisher
- Allen C. Beach (1825–1918), New York politician
- Amy Beach (1867–1944), American composer, also known as Mrs. H.H.A. Beach
- Bill Beach (jazz musician) (born 1953), American jazz musician
- Bill Beach (rockabilly musician) (1932–2024), American musician
- Bill Beach (rower) (1850–1935), Australian sculler
- Carmi W. Beach (1841–1888), American politician in Wisconsin
- Charles L. Beach (1866–1933), president of the University of Connecticut
- David Nelson Beach (1848–1926), American theologian
- Eddie Beach (born 2003), Welsh footballer
- Edward L. Beach Jr. (1918–2002), U.S. Navy submarine commander and author
- Fred Beach (1897–1981), NFL footballer with Los Angeles Buccaneers
- George Beach (politician) (1817–?), New York politician
- George Beach (1926–2016), Canadian-born ice hockey player
- Harlan Page Beach (1854–1933), American missionary, brother of David Nelson Beach
- Jessie G. Beach (1887–1954), American paleontologist and museum aide
- Jim Beach (born 1942) British manager of the rock band Queen
- John Robert Beach (1871–1954), American farmer and politician
- Kyle Beach (born 1990), Canadian former ice hockey player
- Mallory Beach (1999–2019), American teenager killed in a boating accident by a member of the Murdaugh family
- Michael Beach (born 1963), American actor
- Moses Yale Beach (1800–1868), American inventor and publisher
- Nelson J. Beach (1800–1876), New York politician
- Ralph H. Beach, co-inventor of the Edison-Beach railcar
- Rex Beach (1877–1949), American author
- Steven Beach (born 1956), American psychologist
- Sylvia Beach (1887–1962), editor and bookseller
- Tyler Beach (born 1999), American football player
- Walter Beach (born 1933), American football player
- William Beach (disambiguation), several people:

- William Beach (1783–1856), British politician
- William Beach (American politician) (c. 1815–1860), American politician
- William Beach (economist), commissioner of U.S. Bureau of Labor Statistics
- William Dorrance Beach (1856–1932), American army officer
- William Henry Beach (1871–1952), British Army officer

- Zenas Beach (1825–1898), Wisconsin politician
