= Stephenville High School =

Coordinates: 32.2169°N 98.2364°W

Location
- 2650 W Overhill Dr. Stephenville, Texas 76401-1972; United States

Information
- School type: Public high school
- School district: Stephenville Independent School District
- Principal: Stephanie Traweek
- Staff: 82.96 (FTE)
- Grades: 9-12
- Enrollment: 1,115 (2023-2024)
- Student to teacher ratio: 13.44
- Colors: Navy and gold
- Athletics conference: UIL Class AAAA
- Mascot: Yellow Jackets/Honeybees
- Website: Stephenville High School

Stephenville High School, or SHS, is a public high school located in Stephenville, Texas and classified as a 4A school by the University Interscholastic League. It is part of the Stephenville Independent School District located in central Erath County. In 2015, the school was rated "Met Standard" by the Texas Education Agency.

== Athletics ==
The Stephenville Yellow Jackets compete in the following sports

Cross Country, Volleyball, Football, Basketball, Powerlifting, Soccer, Golf, Tennis, Track, Softball & Baseball

SHS has been one of the most successful football programs in the state of Texas in recent years. Though it did not make the playoffs from 1952 to 1989, the arrival of Art Briles helped turn the program around. Under Briles, the Yellow Jackets advanced to the playoffs from 1989 until his departure after the 1999 season, winning four state titles (1993, 1994, 1998, 1999) along the way. The 1998 team posted a then national record 8,650 yards of total offense and still holds the third and fourth positions on the national all-time list. Since Briles left for the collegiate ranks, Stephenville has continued to make the playoffs (with the exception of 2003)

Stephenville won their 5th state title in 2012 under head coach Joe Gillespie (a former player and coach under Art Briles), and their 6th and 7th state titles in 2021 and 2025 respectively under head coach Sterling Doty, also a former Yellow Jacket.

=== State titles ===
- Girls Basketball -
  - 1968(3A)
- Football -
  - 1993(4A), 1994(4A), 1998(4A/D2), 1999(4A/D2), 2012 (3A/D1), 2021 (4A/D1), 2025 (4A/D1)
- Volleyball -
  - 2003(4A)
- Girls Soccer
  - 2017(4A), 2019 (4A)

== Notable alumni ==
- Hugh Wolfe, 1930, American football fullback for the New York Giants
- Branndon Stewart, 1993, American football quarterback at the Texas A&M University
- Kelan Luker, American football player and rock musician and a current American football coach
- Kevin Kolb, 2003, American football quarterback for the Arizona Cardinals, attended the University of Houston
- Brock Holt, 2006, American baseball infielder for Boston Red Sox
- Jevan Snead, 2006, American football quarterback at the University of Mississippi
- Cody Davis, 2008, American football safety at Texas Tech University
- Jarrett Stidham, 2015, American football quarterback for the Denver Broncos and previously for Auburn University
- Coy Eakin, 2022, American football wide receiver at Texas Tech University
- Shelby Slawson, Republican member of the Texas House of Representatives from District 59 (2021–Present)
