= Cody Davis =

American football player (born 1989)

No. 22, 38
- Position: Safety

Personal information
- Born: June 6, 1989 (age 37); Stephenville, Texas, U.S.
- Listed height: 6 ft 2 in (1.88 m)
- Listed weight: 203 lb (92 kg)

Career information
- High school: Stephenville
- College: Texas Tech (2008–2012)
- NFL draft: 2013: undrafted

Career history
- St. Louis / Los Angeles Rams (2013–2017); Jacksonville Jaguars (2018–2019); New England Patriots (2020–2023)

Awards and highlights
- 2× Second-team All-Big 12 (2011, 2012)

Career NFL statistics
- Total tackles: 118
- Fumble recoveries: 3
- Pass deflections: 8
- Interceptions: 2
- Defensive touchdowns: 1
- Stats at Pro Football Reference

Cody Davis (born June 6, 1989) is an American former professional football player who was a safety in the National Football League (NFL). He played college football for the Texas Tech Red Raiders and was signed as an undrafted free agent by the St. Louis Rams in 2013. He also played in the NFL for the Jacksonville Jaguars and New England Patriots.

== Early life ==
Davis attended Stephenville High School in Stephenville, Texas, and he helped lead the school to a combined 33–5 record during his three years as a starter in the defensive backfield. He was named an Associated Press Class 4A Second-team All-state selection, and was voted the District 8-4A Defensive MVP after a senior season. That year, he made 109 tackles, (five for losses), 11 pass breakups and four forced fumbles. As a junior, he was a First-team Class 4A All-State pick by both the AP and the Texas Sports Writers' Association as a junior in 2007, after making up 99 tackles, 21 pass break-ups, nine interceptions, seven forced fumbles and four fumble recoveries. He was inducted into the Stephenville High School Hall of Fame on September 26, 2014.

== College career ==
Davis attended and played collegiately at Texas Tech. As a senior in 2012, Davis was a 1st Team Capital One Academic All-American and was a Second-team All-Big 12 selection for the second consecutive season after making 84 solo tackles and 101 total tackles. He finished his Texas Tech career with 49 starts, including 22 consecutive starts at safety. As a junior in 2011, he was Academic All-Big 12 (1st Team) and led team in tackles (93) while making 72 solo tackles and 21 assisted tackles. In 2010 he was All-Big 12 (Honorable Mention) and an Academic All-Big 12 (1st Team) Davis made 87 total tackles and played in 13 games (13 starts) and was second on the team with 87 total tackles while tying for the team lead (Bront Bird) with 68 solo tackles. In 2009, he was a First-team Phil Steele Freshman All-America and a Second-team College Football News Freshman All-America. In 2008, he was a scout team member and was a redshirt.

== Professional career ==
Pre-draft measurables
Height	Weight	Arm length	Hand span	40-yard dash	10-yard split	20-yard split	20-yard shuttle	Three-cone drill	Vertical jump	Broad jump	Bench press
6 ft 1 7/8 in (1.88 m)	203 lb (92 kg)	30 5/8 in (0.78 m)	9 1/2 in (0.24 m)	4.41 s	1.51 s	2.54 s	4.01 s	6.77 s	41.5 in (1.05 m)	10 ft 3 in (3.12 m)	15 reps
All values from Texas Tech Pro Day

=== St. Louis / Los Angeles Rams ===
Davis was signed as an undrafted free agent by the St. Louis Rams on April 27, 2013, after not being drafted in the 2013 NFL draft. He re-signed with the Rams on a two-year contract on March 9, 2016.

On November 3, 2017, Davis was placed on injured reserve after suffering a thigh injury in Week 6. He was activated off injured reserve to the active roster on December 29, 2017.

=== Jacksonville Jaguars ===
On March 15, 2018, Davis signed with the Jacksonville Jaguars.

=== New England Patriots ===
Davis signed with the New England Patriots on March 23, 2020. He was placed on injured reserve on October 5, 2020, with a ribs injury. He was activated on October 31. In Week 13 against the Los Angeles Chargers, Davis blocked a field goal that was returned by teammate Devin McCourty for a 44 yard touchdown during the 45–0 win.

On March 19, 2021, Davis signed a new two-year deal with the Patriots worth up to $4.5 million.

In Week 6 of the 2022 season, Davis suffered a season-ending knee injury and was placed on injured reserve on October 18, 2022.

On March 21, 2023, Davis re-signed with the Patriots on a one-year contract extension. He was placed on the reserve/PUP list to start the 2023 season, and activated on October 21. On December 24, Davis scored his first career touchdown, recovering a Marvin Mims fumble forced by Marte Mapu in a 26–23 win over the Denver Broncos.

On March 28, 2024, Davis announced his retirement from professional football.

== Personal life ==
Davis married his longtime girlfriend, Ashley Reeves, in April 2013. They have three sons.

Davis is a Christian and an active supporter of the Fellowship of Christian Athletes.

Davis appeared as a contestant on the edition of February 24, 2017 of CBS's The Price Is Right, during Celebrity Charity Week, playing with the help of Chris O'Donnell; he was the last contestant selected from the audience to "come on down" and won $5,000 on the Punch a Bunch game.
