= David Beach =

David Beach may refer to:

- David Beach (historian) (1943–1999), Zimbabwean historian
- David Nelson Beach (1848–1926), American theologian
- David Beach (judge), of Supreme Court of Victoria

== See also ==
- David Beech (born 1954), curator of the British Library Philatelic Collections
