= Jarrett Stidham =

American football player (born 1996)

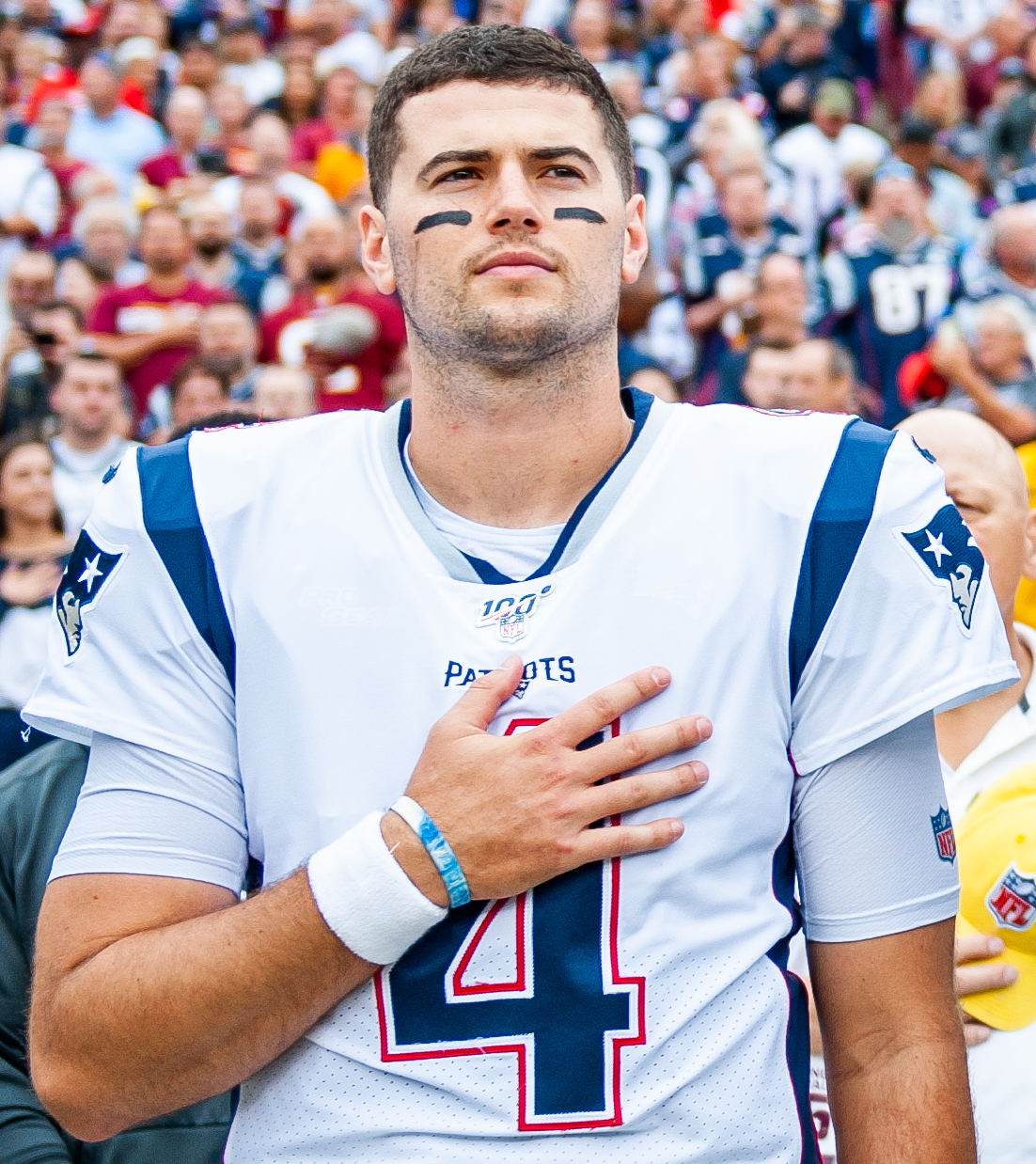
- Stidham with the New England Patriots in 2019

No. 8 – Denver Broncos
- Position: Quarterback
- Roster status: Active

Personal information
- Born: August 8, 1996 (age 30); Corbin, Kentucky, U.S.
- Listed height: 6 ft 3 in (1.91 m)
- Listed weight: 215 lb (98 kg)

Career information
- High school: Stephenville (Stephenville, Texas)
- College: Baylor (2015); Auburn (2017–2018)
- NFL draft: 2019: 4th round, 133rd overall pick

Career history
- New England Patriots (2019–2021); Las Vegas Raiders (2022); Denver Broncos (2023–present)

Awards and highlights
- SEC Newcomer of the Year (2017); Second-team All-SEC (2017)

Career NFL statistics as of 2025
- Passing attempts: 197
- Passing completions: 117
- Completion percentage: 59.4%
- TD–INT: 8–8
- Passing yards: 1,422
- Passer rating: 78.3
- Stats at Pro Football Reference

Jarrett Ryan Stidham (born August 8, 1996) is an American professional football quarterback for the Denver Broncos of the National Football League (NFL). He played college football for the Auburn Tigers following a stint with the Baylor Bears. Stidham was selected by the New England Patriots in the fourth round of the 2019 NFL draft, where he spent his first three seasons as a backup. He played his next season for the Las Vegas Raiders, becoming the team's starter near the end of the year. Stidham joined the Broncos in 2023.

== Early life ==
Stidham was born on August 8, 1996, in Corbin, Kentucky. His family moved to Stephenville, Texas when he was in elementary school. As a senior at Stephenville High School, Stidham completed 183 of 260 passes for 2,934 yards with 35 touchdowns while also rushing for 969 yards and 15 touchdowns. He was rated by Rivals.com as a four-star recruit and was ranked as the sixth-best dual-threat quarterback in his class. Stidham originally committed to Texas Tech University to play college football, but later changed to Baylor University.

College recruiting
Name	Hometown	School	Height	Weight	40^{‡}	Commit date
Jarrett Stidham; QB	Stephenville, Texas	Stephenville HS	6 ft 3 in (1.91 m)	185 lb (84 kg)	4.74	Dec 19, 2014
Jarrett Stidham; QB	Recruit ratings: Scout: Rivals: 247Sports: ESPN:					
Overall recruit ranking: Scout: 11 (QB) Rivals: 6 (QB) ESPN: 2 (Dual-threat QB)
Note: In many cases, Scout, Rivals, 247Sports, On3, and ESPN may conflict in their listings of height and weight.; In these cases, the average was taken. ESPN grades are on a 100-point scale.; Sources: "Baylor Football Commitments". Rivals.; "2015 Baylor College Football Recruiting Commits". Scout.; "ESPN". ESPN.; "Scout.com Team Recruiting Rankings". Scout.; "2015 Team Ranking". Rivals.com.

== College career ==
=== Baylor ===
Stidham entered his true freshman year at Baylor in 2015 as the backup quarterback to Seth Russell. Stidham appeared in the first seven games, completing 24 of 28 passes for 331 yards and six touchdowns. After Russell suffered a neck injury against Iowa State and later a season-ending ankle injury against Oklahoma, Stidham took over as the starter. He started his first career game against the Kansas State Wildcats. Stidham finished the game completing 23 of 33 passes for 419 yards and three touchdowns while also rushing for a touchdown. In his second career start against the Oklahoma Sooners, Stidham injured his back in the first quarter, but was able to remain in the game. He finished the 44–34 loss completing 16 of 27 for 257 yards, two touchdowns, and two interceptions.

The following week, despite being listed as questionable to play in the week leading up to the game, Stidham made his third career start against the Oklahoma State Cowboys. He injured his hand and ankle in the first half of the game and did not return to the field for the second half. On November 25, 2015, Baylor head coach Art Briles announced that Stidham's ankle injury was a chipped bone in the back of his ankle and Stidham would be sidelined for the remainder of the regular season. It was reported that Stidham might be able to return for Baylor's bowl game, but on December 19, Briles announced Stidham would miss the 2015 Russell Athletic Bowl.

In the wake of a sexual abuse scandal at the school, which led to the firing and resignation of much of the coaching staff, and general dissatisfaction backing up Russell, on July 7, 2016, Stidham announced he would be transferring out of Baylor.

=== Auburn ===
After spending a semester at McLennan Community College, where he did not play football, Stidham announced that he would be transferring to Auburn University. Stidham was named as Auburn's starting quarterback for the 2017 season. He led the Tigers to an SEC West Division Championship after victories over top-ranked teams, the Georgia Bulldogs and the Alabama Crimson Tide. Stidham and the Tigers would later lose to the UCF Knights in the 2018 Peach Bowl. On December 4, 2018, Stidham announced that he would forgo his final year of eligibility and declare for the 2019 NFL draft. On December 28, Stidham led Auburn to a 63–14 victory over Purdue in the 2018 Music City Bowl, winning the bowl game's MVP award.

== Professional career ==
Pre-draft measurables
Height	Weight	Arm length	Hand span	Wingspan	40-yard dash	10-yard split	20-yard split	20-yard shuttle	Three-cone drill	Vertical jump	Broad jump	Wonderlic
6 ft 2 3/8 in (1.89 m)	218 lb (99 kg)	32 in (0.81 m)	9 1/8 in (0.23 m)	6 ft 4 1/2 in (1.94 m)	4.81 s	1.63 s	2.83 s	4.33 s	7.28 s	31.0 in (0.79 m)	9 ft 2 in (2.79 m)	27
All values from NFL Combine

=== New England Patriots ===
==== 2019 ====
Stidham was selected by the New England Patriots in the fourth round (133rd overall) of the 2019 NFL draft. He signed a four-year deal worth $3.15 million, including a signing bonus of about $634,000.

At the end of the training camp, Stidham was named the second-string backup to quarterback Tom Brady. Stidham selected the number 4 as his jersey number, making him the first Patriots player since placekicker Adam Vinatieri in 2005 to wear the number. Stidham was also the first Patriots quarterback to use number 4.

During Week 3 against the New York Jets, Stidham relieved Brady in the fourth quarter while the Patriots held a 30–7 lead. He completed two of three passes for 14 yards before throwing an interception to safety Jamal Adams that was returned for a touchdown. Following the interception, Brady returned to finish the game, which the Patriots won 30–14.

==== 2020 ====
After Brady left the Patriots in March 2020, Stidham was seen as his potential successor for the 2020 season. However, the Patriots signed former MVP Cam Newton in July, who became the frontrunner to replace Brady. Newton was announced as the season's starting quarterback on September 3, while Stidham became the third-string quarterback behind Newton and second-string backup Brian Hoyer.

Stidham moved up the depth chart when Newton tested positive for COVID-19 amid Week 4, serving as the second option behind Hoyer against the Kansas City Chiefs. Following an ineffective performance from Hoyer, Stidham was brought in during the third quarter to complete the game. He threw his first career touchdown pass to N'Keal Harry, but was also intercepted twice, including one that was returned for a touchdown by safety Tyrann Mathieu, as the Patriots lost on the road 26–10. Stidham was subsequently promoted to the second option ahead of Hoyer.

Although Newton remained the team's starter for the rest of the season, Stidham made relief appearances during Week 7 against the San Francisco 49ers, Week 13 against the Los Angeles Chargers, and Week 14 against the Los Angeles Rams. The Week 13 appearance occurred in a 45–0 shutout of the Chargers, while the Week 7 and Week 14 games saw Stidham take over for a struggling Newton amid a 33–6 loss in the former and a 24–3 loss in the latter. Despite Stidham replacing Newton in the blowout losses, Patriots head coach Bill Belichick stated after both games that Newton would retain his starting position. Stidham's final relief appearance came in Week 16 after an ineffective performance from Newton against the Buffalo Bills. Entering in the third quarter, Stidham also struggled during the eventual 38–9 loss. He completed four of 11 passes for 44 yards and converted only three first downs, one of which resulted from a penalty.

==== 2021 ====
Following offseason back surgery, Stidham began the 2021 season on the team's reserve physically unable to perform list. He was activated on November 9, ahead of the Week 10 matchup with the Cleveland Browns. Stidham was named the third-string quarterback behind rookie Mac Jones and Brian Hoyer, ultimately not taking the field for the entire year.

=== Las Vegas Raiders ===
On May 13, 2022, Stidham, along with a seventh-round pick in the 2023 NFL draft, was traded to the Las Vegas Raiders for a 2023 sixth-round pick. The trade reunited Stidham with Raiders head coach Josh McDaniels, who was the Patriots' offensive coordinator during his three seasons with the team. Stidham was named the second option to starting quarterback Derek Carr on August 30 and was the only backup quarterback to make the initial 53-man roster.

On December 28, 2022, with two regular season games remaining, Stidham was named the starter for the first time in his career after the Raiders benched Carr. In his first NFL start, Stidham threw for 365 yards, three touchdowns, and two interceptions in the 37–34 overtime loss to the 49ers.

=== Denver Broncos ===
==== 2023 ====
On March 13, 2023, Stidham signed a two-year, $10 million contract with the Denver Broncos.

On December 27, the Broncos announced that Stidham would start the final two games of the season after Russell Wilson was benched. Stidham earned his first career win in a 16–9 victory against the Los Angeles Chargers, completing 20-of-32 passes for 224 yards, a touchdown, and no turnovers.

==== 2024 ====
Stidham spent the 2024 season as the primary backup to rookie Bo Nix. He appeared in three games during the season and did not attempt a pass.

==== 2025 ====
On March 10, 2025, Stidham signed a two-year, $12 million extension with the Broncos with $7 million guaranteed. His only play and on-field appearance of the regular season was a kneel to end the Broncos' Week 8 victory over the Dallas Cowboys; Stidham did not attempt a pass for the second consecutive season.

Following a season-ending ankle injury to Nix during the Broncos' 33–30 overtime victory over the Bills in the Divisional Round, head coach Sean Payton announced that Stidham would start in the AFC Championship Game against his former team, the New England Patriots. Stidham completed 17 of 31 passes for 133 yards, a touchdown, and an interception while also losing a fumble that resulted in a short field and the Patriots' only touchdown of the game as the Broncos lost 10–7.

== Career statistics ==
=== NFL ===
==== Regular season ====
Year	Team	Games			Passing									Rushing					Sacked		Fumbles	
Year	Team	GP	GS	Record	Cmp	Att	Pct	Yds	Avg	Lng	TD	Int	Rtg	Att	Yds	Avg	Lng	TD	Sck	SckY	Fum	Lost
2019	NE	3	0	—	2	4	50.0	14	3.5	11	0	1	18.8	2	−2	−1.0	−1	0	1	7	0	0
2020	NE	5	0	—	22	44	50.0	256	5.8	38	2	3	54.7	7	7	1.0	6	0	4	21	0	0
2021	NE	0	0	—	DNP																	
2022	LV	5	2	0–2	53	83	63.9	656	7.9	60	4	3	89.2	14	84	6.0	11	0	7	47	3	1
2023	DEN	3	2	1–1	40	66	60.6	496	7.5	54	2	1	87.7	9	8	0.9	4	0	7	46	1	0
2024	DEN	3	0	—	0	0	—	0	—	0	0	0	—	4	5	1.3	8	0	0	0	0	0
2025	DEN	1	0	—	0	0	—	0	—	0	0	0	—	1	-1	-1.0	-1	0	0	0	0	0
Career		20	4	1–3	117	197	59.4	1,422	7.2	60	8	8	78.3	37	101	2.7	11	0	19	121	4	1

==== Postseason ====
Year	Team	Games			Passing									Rushing					Sacked		Fumbles	
Year	Team	GP	GS	Record	Cmp	Att	Pct	Yds	Avg	Lng	TD	Int	Rtg	Att	Yds	Avg	Lng	TD	Sck	SckY	Fum	Lost
2019	NE	0	0	—	DNP																	
2021	NE	0	0	—	DNP																	
2024	DEN	0	0	—	DNP																	
2025	DEN	1	1	0–1	17	31	54.8	133	4.3	52	1	1	63.0	4	23	5.8	8	0	3	31	1	1
Career		1	1	0–1	17	31	54.8	133	4.3	52	1	1	63.0	4	23	5.8	8	0	3	31	1	1

=== College ===
Season	Team	Games			Passing								Rushing			
Season	Team	GP	GS	Record	Cmp	Att	Pct	Yds	Y/A	TD	Int	Rtg	Att	Yds	Avg	TD
2015	Baylor	10	3	2–1	75	109	68.8	1,265	11.6	12	2	199.0	36	70	1.9	2
2017	Auburn	14	14	10–4	246	370	66.5	3,158	8.5	18	6	151.0	103	153	1.5	4
2018	Auburn	13	13	8–5	224	369	60.7	2,794	7.6	18	5	137.7	72	1	0.0	3
Career		37	30	20–10	545	848	64.3	7,217	8.5	48	13	151.4	211	224	1.1	9

== Personal life ==
Stidham met his wife, Kennedy Brown, at Baylor and they got married in 2019. They have three children. Brown is the daughter of Harris Blitzer Sports & Entertainment CEO Tad Brown. Stidham is the cousin of former Baylor quarterback Sawyer Robertson.
