= Stewartville, Minnesota =

City in Minnesota, United States

- City
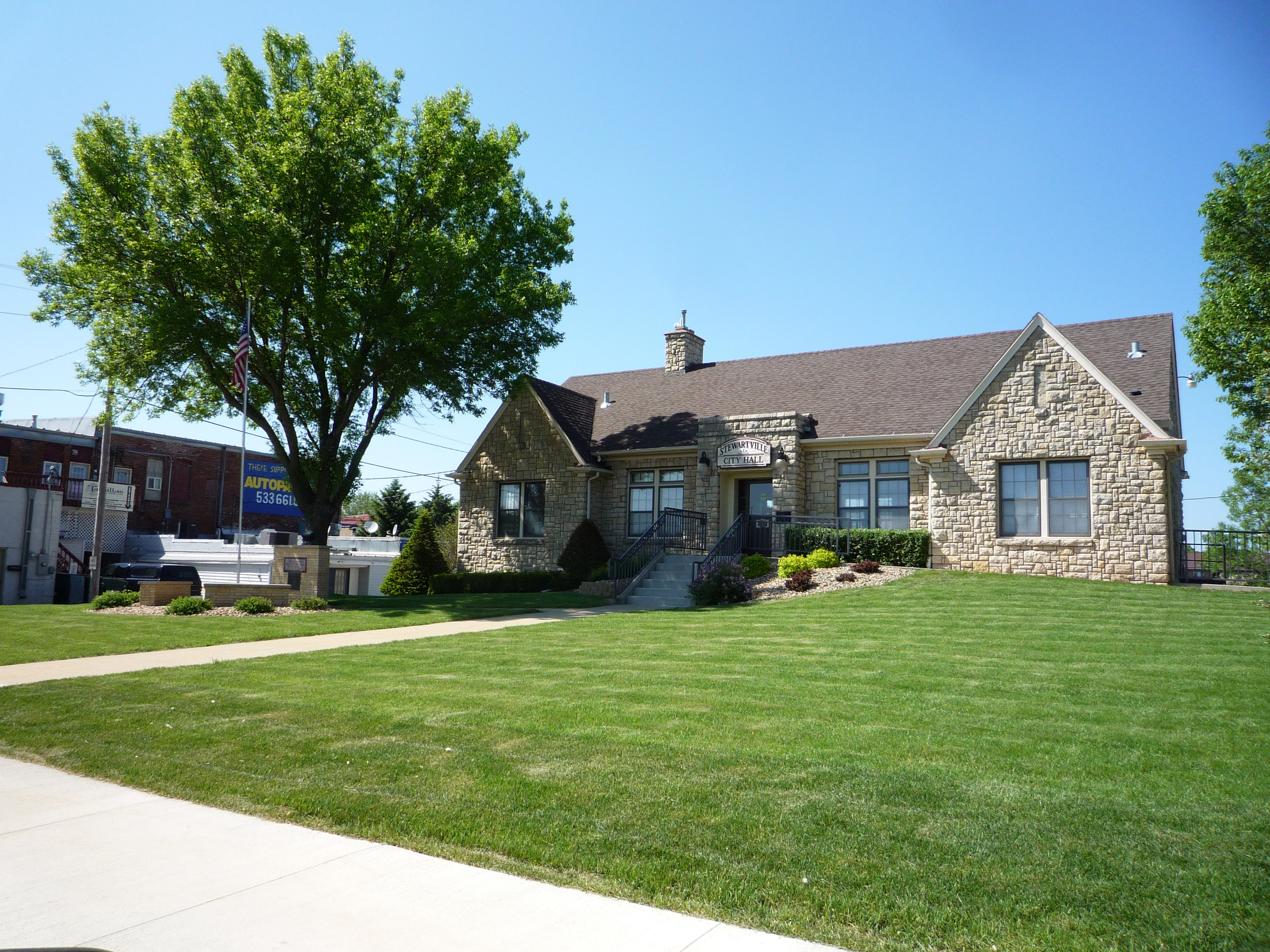
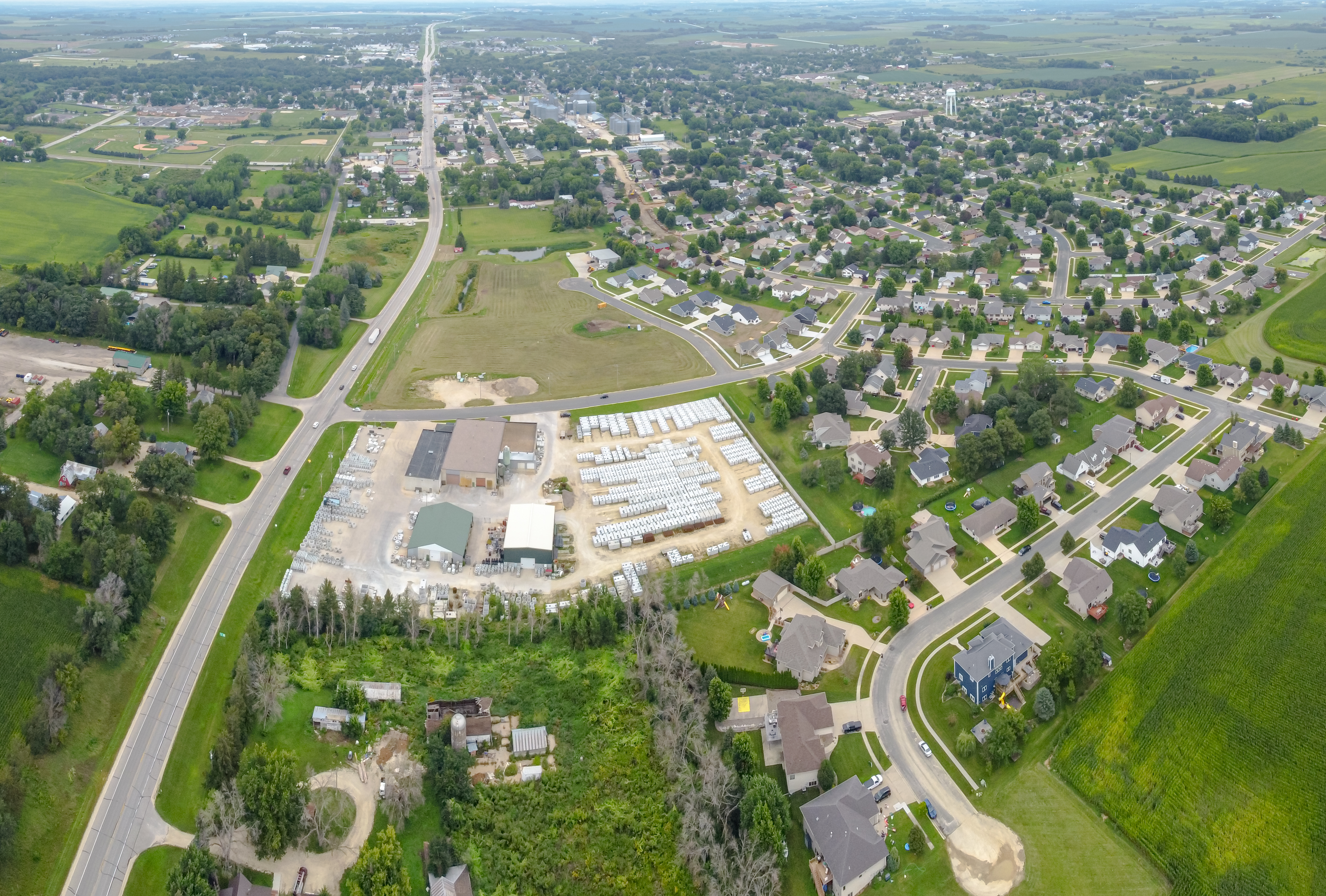
- Stewartville City Hall Aerial view of Stewartville
- Motto: "Welcome on in to Stewartville!"
- Interactive location map of Stewartville
- Coordinates: 43.860791°N 92.489986°W
- Country: United States
- State: Minnesota
- County: Olmsted
- Founded: 1857
- Incorporated: 1906
- Founder: Charles Stewart

Government
  - Type: Mayor–Council
  - Mayor: Jimmie-John King
  - Vice Mayor: Craig Anderson
  - Councilpersons: Josh Arndt; Brent Beyer; Jeremiah Oeltjen

Area
  - City: 3.360 sq mi (8.702 km^{2})
  - Land: 3.360 sq mi (8.702 km^{2})
  - Water: 0 sq mi (0.000 km^{2}) 0.0%
- Elevation: 1,191 ft (363 m)

Population (2020)
  - City: 6,687
  - Estimate (2024): 6,919
  - Density: 1,990/sq mi (768.4/km^{2})
  - Urban: 6,635
  - Metro: 230,742
- Time zone: UTC–6 (Central (CST))
  - Summer (DST): UTC–5 (CDT)
- ZIP Code: 55976
- Area codes: 507 and 924
- FIPS code: 27-62806
- GNIS feature ID: 2395968
- Website: stewartvillemn.com

Stewartville is a city in Olmsted County, Minnesota, United States. Stewartville sits just south of the Rochester International Airport, which is about 12 miles south of the city of Rochester. The population was 6,687 at the 2020 census, and was estimated at 6,919 in 2024. Stewartville is part of the Rochester metropolitan area.

== History ==
Stewartville was founded in 1857 and was incorporated in 1906.

Stewartville was founded in the 1850s by Charles Stewart, and named for him. A post office has been in operation at Stewartville since 1858.

== Geography ==
According to the United States Census Bureau, the city has a total area of 3.360 square miles (8.70 km^{2}), all land.

U.S. Route 63 and Minnesota State Highway 30 are two of the main routes in the city.

Interstate 90 is immediately north and west of Stewartville.

== Climate ==
The Köppen Climate Classification subtype for this climate is "Dfb" (Warm Summer Continental Climate).

Climate data for Stewartville, Minnesota
Month	Jan	Feb	Mar	Apr	May	Jun	Jul	Aug	Sep	Oct	Nov	Dec	Year
Mean daily maximum °C (°F)	−6 (22)	−3 (27)	4 (39)	13 (56)	20 (68)	26 (78)	28 (82)	27 (80)	22 (71)	15 (59)	5 (41)	−3 (27)	12 (54)
Mean daily minimum °C (°F)	−16 (4)	−13 (8)	−6 (21)	1 (34)	8 (46)	13 (56)	16 (60)	14 (58)	9 (49)	3 (38)	−4 (24)	−12 (11)	1 (34)
Average precipitation mm (inches)	20 (0.8)	20 (0.8)	43 (1.7)	69 (2.7)	91 (3.6)	110 (4.5)	99 (3.9)	99 (3.9)	81 (3.2)	53 (2.1)	41 (1.6)	25 (1)	760 (29.8)
Average precipitation days	8	7	9	10	12	11	9	9	9	8	8	8	108
Source: Weatherbase

== Demographics ==
Historical population
Census	Pop.	Note	%±
1900	830		—
1910	794		−4.3%
1920	941		18.5%
1930	793		−15.7%
1940	1,025		29.3%
1950	1,193		16.4%
1960	1,670		40.0%
1970	2,802		67.8%
1980	3,925		40.1%
1990	4,520		15.2%
2000	5,411		19.7%
2010	5,916		9.3%
2020	6,687		13.0%
2024 (est.)	6,919		3.5%
U.S. Decennial Census; 2020 Census

According to realtor website Zillow, the average price of a home as of November 30, 2025, in Stewartville is $323,391.

As of the 2023 American Community Survey, there are 2,608 estimated households in Stewartville with an average of 2.56 persons per household. The city has a median household income of $65,714. Approximately 3.4% of the city's population lives at or below the poverty line. Stewartville has an estimated 71.4% employment rate, with 31.7% of the population holding a bachelor's degree or higher and 95.6% holding a high school diploma. There were 2,716 housing units at an average density of 808.33 per square mile (312.1/km^{2}).

The median age in the city was 36.8 years.

=== Racial and ethnic composition ===
Stewartville, Minnesota – racial and ethnic composition Note: the US Census treats Hispanic/Latino as an ethnic category. This table excludes Latinos from the racial categories and assigns them to a separate category. Hispanics/Latinos may be of any race.
Race / ethnicity (NH = non-Hispanic)
Race / ethnicity (NH = non-Hispanic)	Population 1990		Population 2000		Population 2010		Population 2020	
Race / ethnicity (NH = non-Hispanic)	Number	Percent	Number	Percent	Number	Percent	Number	Percent
White alone (NH)	4,473	98.96%	5,227	96.60%	5,713	96.57%	6,011	89.89%
Black or African American alone (NH)	4	0.09%	38	0.70%	32	0.54%	71	1.06%
Native American or Alaska Native alone (NH)	16	0.35%	12	0.22%	12	0.20%	23	0.34%
Asian alone (NH)	14	0.31%	28	0.52%	27	0.46%	39	0.58%
Pacific Islander alone (NH)	—	—	1	0.02%	0	0.00%	0	0.00%
Other race alone (NH)	0	0.00%	0	0.00%	2	0.03%	18	0.27%
Mixed race or multiracial (NH)	—	—	51	0.94%	42	0.71%	270	4.04%
Hispanic or Latino (any race)	13	0.29%	54	1.00%	88	1.49%	255	3.81%
Total	4,520	100.00%	5,411	100.00%	5,916	100.00%	6,687	100.00%

=== 2020 census ===
As of the 2020 census, there were 6,687 people, 2,593 households, and 1,769 families residing in the city. The population density was 2,067.08 inhabitants per square mile (798.1/km^{2}). The median age was 35.9 years. 27.8% of residents were under the age of 18 and 14.6% were 65 years of age or older. For every 100 females there were 91.8 males, and for every 100 females age 18 and over there were 88.9 males.

99.2% of residents lived in urban areas, while 0.8% lived in rural areas.

Of households in the city, 36.8% had children under the age of 18 living in them. Of all households, 50.2% were married-couple households, 14.5% were households with a male householder and no spouse or partner present, and 25.6% were households with a female householder and no spouse or partner present. About 25.3% of all households were made up of individuals, and 11.1% had someone living alone who was 65 years of age or older.

There were 2,696 housing units, of which 3.8% were vacant. The homeowner vacancy rate was 0.9% and the rental vacancy rate was 6.5%. Housing unit density was 833.38 per square mile (321.8/km^{2}).

=== 2010 census ===
As of the 2010 census, there were 5,916 people, 2,318 households, and 1,596 families residing in the city. The population density was 1,946.05 inhabitants per square mile (751.4/km^{2}). There were 2,425 housing units at an average density of 797.70 per square mile (308.0/km^{2}). The racial makeup of the city was 97.55% White, 0.54% African American, 0.20% Native American, 0.46% Asian, 0.00% Pacific Islander, 0.39% from some other races and 0.86% from two or more races. Hispanic or Latino residents of any race were 1.49% of the population.

There were 2,318 households, of which 38.1% had children under the age of 18 living with them, 53.3% were married couples living together, 11.4% had a female householder with no husband present, 4.2% had a male householder with no wife present, and 31.1% were non-families. 25.8% of all households were made up of individuals, and 11.3% had someone living alone who was 65 years of age or older. The average household size was 2.52 and the average family size was 3.02.

The median age in the city was 34.6 years. 28.2% of residents were under the age of 18; 7.6% were between the ages of 18 and 24; 27.8% were from 25 to 44; 22.5% were from 45 to 64; and 14% were 65 years of age or older. The gender makeup of the city was 47.5% male and 52.5% female.

=== 2000 census ===
As of the 2000 census, there were 5,411 people, 2,013 households, and 1,417 families residing in the city. The population density was 2,579.59 inhabitants per square mile (996.0/km^{2}). There were 2,074 housing units at an average density of 988.74 per square mile (381.8/km^{2}). The racial makeup of the city was 97.10% White, 0.70% African American, 0.30% Native American, 0.52% Asian, 0.02% Pacific Islander, 0.33% from some other races and 1.03% from two or more races. Hispanic or Latino residents of any race were 1.00% of the population.

There were 2,013 households, out of which 41.8% had children under the age of 18 living with them, 55.9% were married couples living together, 10.7% had a female householder with no husband present, and 29.6% were non-families. 23.8% of all households were made up of individuals, and 9.7% had someone living alone who was 65 years of age or older. The average household size was 2.61 and the average family size was 3.13.

In the city, 30.2% of the population was under the age of 18, 8.2% was from 18 to 24, 30.6% from 25 to 44, 19.2% from 45 to 64, and 11.8% was 65 years of age or older. The median age was 33 years. For every 100 females, there were 89.5 males. For every 100 females age 18 and over, there were 85.2 males.

The median income for a household in the city was $44,135, and the median income for a family was $52,037. Males had a median income of $34,162 versus $24,838 for females. The per capita income for the city was $18,780. About 2.9% of families and 5.4% of the population were below the poverty line, including 4.2% of those under age 18 and 14.8% of those age 65 or over.

== Education ==
The Stewartville School District (ISD #534) serves the community of Stewartville, has five public schools. Stewartville High School's mascot is the "Tigers". 2023-2024 enrollment was 591 students.

- Central Education Center (Preschool–Pre-kindergarten)
- Bonner Elementary School (Kindergarten–2nd grades)
- Bear Cave Intermediate School (3rd–5th grades)
- Stewartville Middle School (6th–8th grades)
- Stewartville High School (9th–12th grades)

Stewartville is also home to an Acton Academy Stewartville is a private non-denomination K-12 School.

== 2025 Shooting ==
On the morning of December 12, 2025, a shooting occurred in the parking lot of Stewartville High School. The incident took place at approximately 5:00 a.m. as members of the high school wrestling team were preparing to board a bus for a tournament when gunfire was heard.

== 2026 Tornado ==
On April 17, 2026, a tornado hit the communities of Marion Township and Quincy Township around the southern Rochester area, including Stewartville. After the tornado struck the area that afternoon, a total of 22 homes in Stewartville suffered minor or major damage. No injuries were reported as a result.

== Notable people ==
- John Robert Beach, farmer and Minnesota state legislator
- Jill Billings, Wisconsin State Assembly
- John Paul Goode, a geographer and cartographer
- Jason Hammel, half of Indie-Pop duo Mates of State
- David C. Hodge, president of Miami University
- Richard Warren Sears, founder of Sears, Roebuck & Company
- Jake Johnson, U.S. Representative for Minnesota's 1st congressional district
