= Kevin Kolb =

American football player (born 1984)

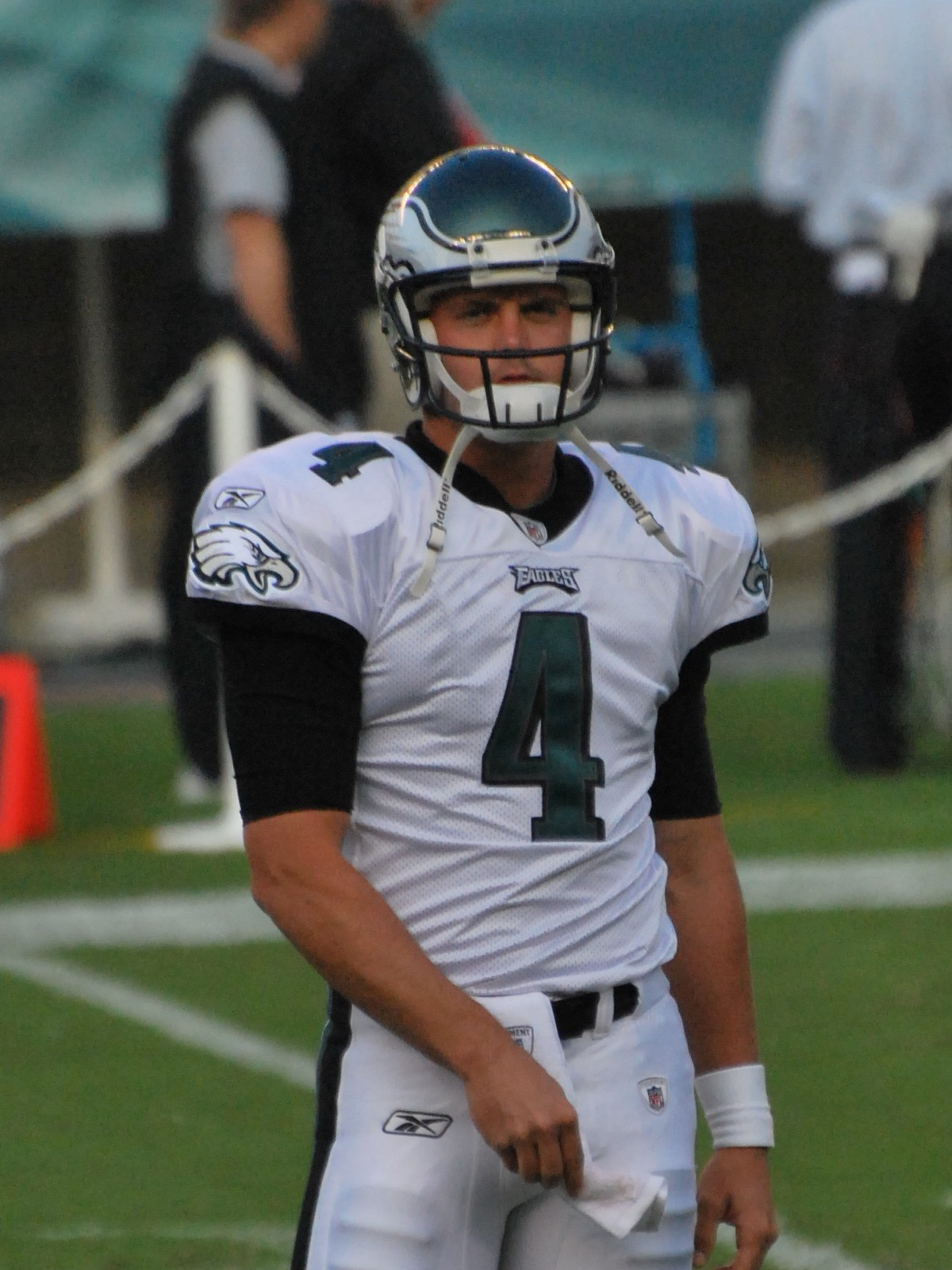
- Kolb with the Philadelphia Eagles in 2009

No. 4
- Position: Quarterback

Personal information
- Born: August 24, 1984 (age 42); Victoria, Texas, U.S.
- Listed height: 6 ft 3 in (1.91 m)
- Listed weight: 218 lb (99 kg)

Career information
- High school: Stephenville (Stephenville, Texas)
- College: Houston (2003–2006)
- NFL draft: 2007: 2nd round, 36th overall pick

Career history
- Philadelphia Eagles (2007–2010); Arizona Cardinals (2011–2012); Buffalo Bills (2013)

Awards and highlights
- Conference USA Offensive MVP (2006); 2× Third-team All-Conference USA (2003, 2005); Conference USA Freshman of the Year (2003); Conference USA All-Freshman team (2003); The Sporting News third-team Freshman All-American (2003); CollegeFootballNews.com Freshman of the Year (2003)

Career NFL statistics
- Passing attempts: 755
- Passing completions: 449
- Completion percentage: 59.5%
- TD–INT: 28–25
- Passing yards: 5,206
- Passer rating: 78.9
- Stats at Pro Football Reference

Kevin Benjamin Kolb (/ˈkɒb/ kahb; born August 24, 1984) is an American former professional football player who was a quarterback in the National Football League (NFL). He played college football for the Houston Cougars and was selected by the Philadelphia Eagles in the second round of the 2007 NFL draft. He was also a member of the Arizona Cardinals and the Buffalo Bills.

Kolb attended Stephenville High School in Stephenville, Texas, where he was a three-year starter at quarterback. He moved on to the University of Houston where he earned Conference USA Offensive Most Valuable Player of the Year honors in 2006. Kolb started for two games in place of the injured Donovan McNabb during the 2009 NFL season for the Eagles, and earned NFC Player of the Week honors following his week 3 performance against the Kansas City Chiefs. Following McNabb's trade to the Washington Redskins in April 2010, Kolb became the starting quarterback for the Eagles. However, after suffering a concussion in week 1 against the Green Bay Packers, Kolb was replaced at quarterback by Michael Vick. Vick suffered a rib cartilage injury in week four and Kolb was named the starter. When Vick returned after week eight, Kolb was relegated to a backup role. Kolb was traded to the Arizona Cardinals prior to the start of the 2011 season. Kolb was released by the Cardinals on March 15, 2013.

== Early life ==
While attending Stephenville High School in Stephenville, Texas, Kolb became the starting quarterback for the Yellow Jackets during his sophomore year. He was a two-time UIL District 8-4A offensive MVP. His most outstanding year was his senior year, 2002, in which he completed 206 of 321 passing attempts for 3,357 yards and 29 touchdowns, as well as rushing for 197 yards. At the end of the 2002 season, he earned honorable mention All-State and second-team Academic All-State honors.

== College career ==
Kolb initially committed to Oklahoma State to play college football but rescinded this commitment when Houston hired head coach Art Briles, a former head coach at Stephenville High School. Kolb was also recruited by TCU, Oklahoma and Texas Tech.

One day before the season-opener in 2003, Kolb was named the starter in Houston as a true freshman, the first true freshman quarterback to start in the season-opener in school history, making his debut against Rice at Robertson Stadium. On September 20, Kolb threw for 321 yards and four touchdowns and went 20-for-29 passing in the 42–35 win over Mississippi State. He was named Conference USA Player of the Week for his performance. On October 25, Kolb accounted for over 400 yards passing and 100 yards rushing against TCU in a 62–55 loss to the Horned Frogs, only the fourth time this feat had been achieved in Division I-A. He tied the league record with 578 total yards, and earned Conference USA offensive co-player of the week honors for his performance. Kolb finished the season with 3,131 passing yards, 25 touchdowns, and only six interceptions en route to a 7–6 record on the year, which ended with a 54–48 loss to Hawaii in the Hawaii Bowl. Following the season, Kolb was named Conference USA Freshman of the Year.

Kolb was named to the Walter Camp Award, Davey O'Brien Award and Maxwell Award watchlists prior to the start of the 2004 season. He started in all 11 games in 2004, finishing first in the conference in total offense with 256.1 yards per game, and he passed for 2,766 yards and 11 touchdowns.

Kolb was named to the Maxwell Award and Davey O'Brien Award watchlists for the second straight year in 2005. After a losing season in 2004, Kolb led the Cougars to a 6–5 regular-season record in 2005. He was named the Cougars' MVP in the Fort Worth Bowl in a 42–13 loss to Kansas after passing for 214 yards and scoring one rushing touchdown. He finished the season with 3,258 passing yards, and became the school's all-time total offense leader. He earned third-team All-Conference USA honors following the season.

Kolb was named to the Maxwell Award watchlist for the third consecutive year in 2006. He was named the consensus Conference USA Preseason Offensive Player of the Year, and he earned preseason all-conference honors. The 2006 season was Kolb's signature college year, in which he threw 30 touchdowns and only four interceptions on the way to a 10–4 record and a Conference USA championship. He went 22-for-35 for 235 yards and three touchdowns in a win over Rice University on September 2, and was named the Conference USA Player of the Week for his efforts. He was named as a finalist for the Johnny Unitas Golden Arm Award on November 1. He was named the Conference USA Offensive Player of the Year on November 30. Kolb won the conference's offensive MVP, but Houston lost to South Carolina 44–36 in the Liberty Bowl. He finished the season with 3,808 passing yards, 30 touchdowns and four interceptions. Kolb ended his career with 12,964 total passing yards, fifth all-time.

Kolb was invited to play in the 2007 East–West Shrine Game on January 20, 2007, and the 2007 Senior Bowl on January 27.

== Professional career ==
=== Pre-draft ===
Pre-draft measurables
Height	Weight	Arm length	Hand span	40-yard dash	10-yard split	20-yard split	20-yard shuttle	Three-cone drill	Vertical jump	Broad jump	Wonderlic
6 ft 3 1/8 in (1.91 m)	218 lb (99 kg)	32 1/4 in (0.82 m)	9 7/8 in (0.25 m)	4.85 s	1.73 s	2.83 s	4.44 s	6.94 s	32.5 in (0.83 m)	9 ft 4 in (2.84 m)	28
All values from 2007 NFL Scouting Combine

Kolb was rated as the sixth-best quarterback in the 2007 NFL draft by NFLDraftScout.com, and was projected to be drafted in the third or fourth round. He hired Jeff Nalley and Vann McElroy as his agents prior to the draft, and they hired former NFL quarterback Jerry Rhome to work with Kolb to get him ready for the pre-draft workouts. He worked out with Danny Arnold in Stafford, Texas, in February 2007 in order to prepare for the NFL Scouting Combine. Kolb worked out for the Baltimore Ravens in the first week of April, and followed it up with a visit to the Philadelphia Eagles.

=== Philadelphia Eagles ===
Kolb was selected by the Philadelphia Eagles in the second round (36th overall) of the 2007 NFL draft. He was the third quarterback taken in the draft behind JaMarcus Russell (1st overall) and Brady Quinn (22nd overall). He signed a four-year, $4.285 million contract with the team on July 25, 2007. Kolb spent 2007 as the third-string quarterback behind Donovan McNabb and A. J. Feeley.

In his second year in the league, Kolb was promoted to second-string quarterback ahead of A. J. Feeley. He played the entire second half of the Eagles game against the Baltimore Ravens on November 23 after an infamous benching of McNabb. Kolb threw an interception in the endzone to Ed Reed, who took it back 108 yards for a touchdown, an NFL record. Kolb completed only 17 passes on 34 attempts for 144 yards, throwing no touchdowns and four interceptions during the season.

Kolb's first NFL start was a 48–22 loss against the New Orleans Saints at home on September 20, 2009, due to an injury to McNabb. His first career touchdown was recorded in the first quarter of that game on a 71-yard pass to DeSean Jackson; he threw for 391 yards on 31 completions. On September 27, 2009, Kolb made his second start in place of McNabb, throwing for 327 yards and two touchdowns in a 34–14 win against the Kansas City Chiefs. Kolb became the first quarterback in NFL history to throw for more than 300 yards in each of his first two career starts. He was named the NFC Offensive Player of the Week after his efforts against the Chiefs.

Kolb expressed his desire to be the starting quarterback for the Eagles during the 2010 offseason: "Obviously my goal is to be the starter and to start for 16 games and to lead this team as far as we can go. Personally, I don't have a lot of personal goals right now, they're more team-oriented, besides me getting on the field and proving I can take over this thing." Kolb gained many comparisons to the situation Aaron Rodgers endured backing up Brett Favre during his first three seasons. Kolb and Rodgers reached out to one another to share their similar plights.

On March 26, Adam Schefter reported that the Eagles expected Kolb to be the starting quarterback for the 2010 season. On April 4, McNabb was traded to the Washington Redskins, making Kolb the starting quarterback. Kolb signed a one-year contract extension worth $12.25 million on April 29, keeping him under contract with the Eagles through the 2011 season.

In the Eagles' season-opener against the Green Bay Packers, the supposed start of the "Kevin Kolb Era," he was tackled by Packers linebacker Clay Matthews, and sustained a concussion. For precautionary measures, Kolb was withdrawn from the game. After passing a series of tests, he was nonetheless withheld for the game against the Detroit Lions. On September 21, backup quarterback Michael Vick was named the starting quarterback over Kolb for the rest of the season following Vick's win over the Lions. Kolb took over for Vick in a game against the Washington Redskins in Week 4 after Vick suffered a chest injury. Kolb went 22-for-35 with 201 passing yards, one touchdown and an interception in place of Vick. However, he was still beaten by the Redskins and their new starting quarterback, McNabb, 17–12. Due to Vick's injury, Kolb started the next three games. Against the Atlanta Falcons in week 6, Kolb went 23-for-29 for 326 yards, three touchdowns and one interception, and was named the NFC Offensive Player of the Week following his performance. During the game, Kolb made an illegal horse-collar tackle on Falcons safety William Moore following an interception. The Eagles were penalized 15 yards and Kolb was later fined $5,000 by the league, the first time a quarterback was fined for a horse-collar tackle. Kolb's final appearance with the Eagles came in the regular season finale, as the Eagles were resting many starters to be healthy for the playoffs.

After the 2010 season, there was speculation that the Eagles would look to make a deal for Kolb since Vick was the clear starting quarterback. However, due to the 2011 NFL Labor Dispute, the Eagles were unable to trade away Kolb. On July 19, 2011, Kolb expressed interest in playing for the Arizona Cardinals, saying "Arizona would be a great place" to play.

=== Arizona Cardinals ===
Kolb was traded to the Arizona Cardinals on July 28, 2011, in exchange for cornerback Dominique Rodgers-Cromartie and a second-round draft pick in the 2012 NFL draft (which the Eagles traded for draft picks used on Vinny Curry and Brandon Boykin). Kolb signed a new five-year contract worth $63.5 million with the Cardinals after the trade.

Kolb started his first game for the Cardinals on September 11, 2011, against the Carolina Panthers in the first week of the 2011 NFL season. Kolb was 18-of-27 for 309 yards, and two touchdowns in the 28–21 win over the Panthers. He went 17 for 30 passing for 251 yards, two touchdowns (including a 73-yard pass to Larry Fitzgerald) and an interception the next week in a loss to the Washington Redskins. In week 3, in a loss against the Seattle Seahawks, he had 252 yards passing on 25 completions and 39 attempts, with a touchdown and two interceptions. The next week against the New York Giants, he went 20-for-34 passing for 237 yards, one interception, and one fumble. In week 5, he had 232 yards passing and three turnovers. He went 18 for 34 with 272 yards, two touchdowns, and an interception in a fifth-straight loss during week 7 against the Pittsburgh Steelers. Against the Baltimore Ravens in week 8, Kolb suffered turf toe in the first quarter but remained in the game, passing for 153 yards on 10 completions, one touchdown, and one interception. The team lost its seventh-straight game.

After being held out of next four games with the foot injury, he returned for a week 13 overtime victory against the Dallas Cowboys in which he had 247 yards and threw the game-winning 52-yard screen pass to LaRod Stephens-Howling. On the first offensive possession of the game the following week against the San Francisco 49ers, he suffered a head injury and left the game with concussion-related symptoms. He missed the last three games of the season due to lingering concussion symptoms.

In 2012, Kolb and John Skelton competed for the starting quarterback position, with Skelton being named the starter for week 1 by head coach Ken Whisenhunt. Skelton suffered an injury in the fourth quarter of the game, and Kolb led the team to a come-from-behind victory. The Cardinals began the season with four straight wins. Skelton was eventually ruled out for the Week 2 matchup against the New England Patriots. Arizona was handed their first loss of the season by the 2–2 St. Louis Rams, by a final score of 17–3. Kolb completed just around 50% of his passes, and was sacked 9 times (The 2012 Cardinals became the first team since their 2003 counterparts to allow eight or more sacks in consecutive games). In an October 14 matchup against the Buffalo Bills, Kolb suffered a rib injury late in the fourth quarter. Skelton began taking snaps for the injured Kolb and was only able to complete 2 of 10 passes with a game-costing interception in the OT period. This injury caused Kolb to miss the following seven games, all of which the Cardinals lost. Kolb had been sacked 27 times in the five starts he had. Kolb was placed on injured reserve on December 12, 2012.

The Cardinals released Kolb on March 15, 2013, after failing to agree to a restructured contract.

=== Buffalo Bills ===
Kolb agreed to a two-year contract for $13 million with the Buffalo Bills on March 30, 2013. On August 24, Kolb suffered a severe concussion in a preseason game against the Washington Redskins. He was placed on injured reserve on August 30. Kolb was released on March 11, 2014.

=== Retirement ===
Kolb retired in 2014 due to post-concussion syndrome, citing lingering effects from three career concussions.

== Career statistics ==
=== NFL ===
Year	Team	Games		Passing								Rushing				Sacked		Fumbles	
Year	Team	GP	GS	Cmp	Att	Pct	Yds	Y/A	TD	Int	Rtg	Att	Yds	Avg	TD	Sck	SckY	Fum	Lost
2007	PHI	1	0	0	0	0	0	0	0	0	0	3	−2	−0.7	0	2	13	1	1
2008	PHI	6	0	17	34	50.0	144	4.2	0	4	21.8	13	2	0.2	0	0	0	0	0
2009	PHI	5	2	62	96	64.6	741	7.7	4	3	88.9	5	−1	−0.2	1	3	27	2	1
2010	PHI	7	5	115	189	60.8	1,197	6.3	7	7	76.1	15	65	4.3	0	15	99	6	3
2011	ARI	9	9	146	253	57.7	1,955	7.7	9	8	81.1	17	65	3.8	0	30	219	8	3
2012	ARI	6	5	109	183	59.6	1,169	6.4	8	3	86.1	16	100	6.3	1	27	159	2	2
2013	BUF	0	0	DNP															
Totals		32	21	449	755	59.5	5,206	6.9	28	25	78.9	69	229	3.3	2	77	517	19	10

=== College ===
Season	Team	Passing								Rushing			
Season	Team	Cmp	Att	Pct	Yds	Y/A	TD	Int	Rtg	Att	Yds	Avg	TD
2003	Houston	220	360	61.1	3,131	8.7	25	6	153.8	139	346	2.5	7
2004	Houston	198	353	56.1	2,766	7.8	11	6	128.8	118	51	0.4	5
2005	Houston	254	420	60.5	3,258	7.8	19	15	133.4	104	200	1.9	5
2006	Houston	292	432	67.6	3,809	8.8	30	4	162.7	111	154	1.4	4
Career		964	1,565	61.6	12,964	8.3	85	31	145.1	472	751	1.6	21

== Personal life ==
Kolb married his wife Whitney Huddleston in February 2007. Whitney gave birth to their first child, a daughter named Kamryn June, on January 10, 2009, and their second child, a daughter named Atley Rose, was born in April 2010.

Kolb majored in business entrepreneurship at the University of Houston.

Kolb competed in North Texas fishing tournaments in the offseason. Kolb also enjoys hunting wild hogs in his spare time.

On June 28, 2014, Kolb was arrested in Willacy County, Texas, for boating while intoxicated.

== See also ==
- List of Division I FBS passing yardage leaders
