= William Beech (disambiguation) =

William Beech (1898–1971) was a Canadian politician.

William Beech may also refer to:

- William Beeche (fl. 1386), English MP
- William Beech, character in Goodnight Mister Tom (film)
- William Beech, character in Innocent (TV series)
- William Beech of Beech's periscope rifle

== See also ==
- William Beach (disambiguation)
