= Stephenville Independent School District =

School district in Texas

Stephenville Independent School District is a public school district based in Stephenville, Texas (USA).

In 2009, the school district was rated "academically acceptable" by the Texas Education Agency. In 2019, it received a rating of "A".

== Schools ==
- Stephenville High School (Grades 9-12)
- Henderson Jr. High School (Grades 7-8)
- Gilbert Intermediate School (Grades 5-6)
- Hook Elementary School (Grades 3-4)
- Chamberlin Elementary School (Grades 1-2)
- Central Elementary School (Grades PK-K)
