= Jessie G. Beach =

American paleontologist and museum aide

- Born: October 5, 1887; Stephenville, Texas, US
- Died: August 16, 1954 (aged 66); Fort Worth, Texas, US
- Education: George Washington University
- Occupation: Museum aide
- Known for: One of the "Smithsonian women in science"
- Scientific career
- Fields: Paleontology
- Workplaces: Smithsonian Institution

Jessie G. Beach (1887 – 1954) was an American paleontologist and museum aide. She worked for the Smithsonian Institution's department of paleobiology at the United States National Museum (now the National Museum of Natural History). Beach was one of the notable "Smithsonian women in science", working at a time when very few women had these roles.

== Biography ==
Jessie G. Beach was born on October 5, 1887, in Stephenville, Erath County, Texas, to parents Luella (née Wood) and Benjamin F. Beach. She was a Baptist. Beach attended Baylor University, and George Washington University. She received a B.S. and M.S. degree from George Washington University, where her graduate studies were focused on archaeology.

From 1918 until 1920, Beach worked at the Smithsonian Institution as a typist, followed by a promotion to a museum aide which she remained at until her death in 1954. In 1922, she traveled to France, Italy, Germany, Belgium, England, and Scotland in order to consult museums on their best cataloguing practices. In 1945, she aided the head curator in preparing exhibitions, which often meant proper labeling, describing scientific terms, cleaning, and rearranging displays. She served as an aide to several departments and for several people including Charles E. Resser, Ray S. Bassler, and William F. Foshag. Her work at the museum influenced the publishing of Bryozoa of the Philippine Region (1929), authored by Ferdinand Canu and Ray S. Bassler.

Beach died in the hospital on August 16, 1954, in Fort Worth, Texas, after struggling with her health since that April. She was cremated in Dallas, and has a gravestone at the Beach Cemetery in Johnsville, Texas.

== Publications ==
Between 1929 and 1931, Beach wrote articles for the Evening Star newspaper in Washington, D.C. about new museum developments.

- Beach, Jessie G. (August 14, 1929). "Rare Work of Art On View In Capital". Evening Star (Washington, District of Columbia). p. 4. OCLC 974435782.
- Beach, Jessie G. (August 25, 1929). "Scientists Study Borax Deposits". Evening Star (Washington, District of Columbia). p. 13.
- Beach, Jessie G. (October 27, 1929). "Persian Tapestry Shows Many Faces". Evening Star (Washington, District of Columbia). p. 11.
- Beach, Jessie G. (December 7, 1930). "Native Silver Ore Shown At Museum". Evening Star (Washington, District of Columbia). p. 25.
- Beach, Jessie G. (December 26, 1931). "Horse's Ancestor Found, Missing Link in Evolution Chain Discovered". Evening Star (Washington, District of Columbia). p. 3.
