= Brock Holt =

American baseball player (born 1988)

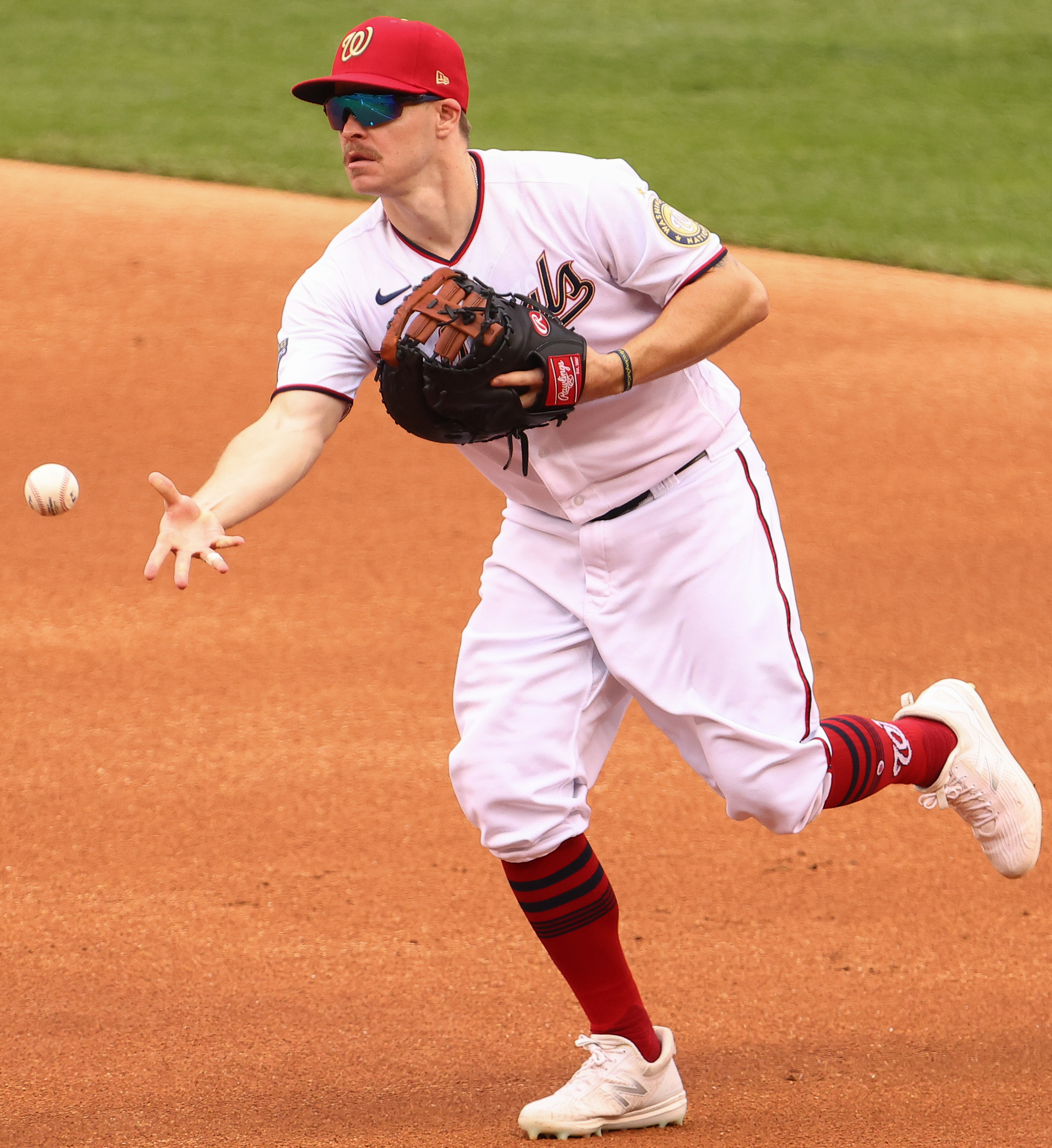
- Holt with the Washington Nationals in 2020
- Utility player
- Born: June 11, 1988 (age 38); Fort Worth, Texas, U.S.
- Batted: Left Threw: Right

MLB debut
- September 1, 2012, for the Pittsburgh Pirates

Last MLB appearance
- October 2, 2021, for the Texas Rangers

MLB statistics
- Batting average: .262
- Home runs: 25
- Runs batted in: 234
- Stats at Baseball Reference

Teams
- Pittsburgh Pirates (2012); Boston Red Sox (2013–2019); Milwaukee Brewers (2020); Washington Nationals (2020); Texas Rangers (2021)

Career highlights and awards
- All-Star (2015); World Series champion (2018)

Brock Wyatt Holt (born June 11, 1988), nicknamed "the Brock Star", is an American former professional baseball utility player. He played in Major League Baseball (MLB) for the Pittsburgh Pirates, Boston Red Sox, Milwaukee Brewers, Washington Nationals, and Texas Rangers.

Holt made his MLB debut for the Pirates in 2012 and was traded to the Red Sox during the 2012–13 offseason. While primarily used as an infielder, he played at every position except for catcher throughout his career. Listed at 5 feet 10 inches (1.78 m) and 180 pounds (82 kg), Holt batted left-handed and threw right-handed. Holt was selected to represent the Red Sox in the 2015 MLB All-Star Game. Holt hit for the cycle two times in his career, and is the only player in MLB history to do so in a postseason game.

== Amateur career ==
Holt graduated in 2006 from Stephenville High School in Texas. In 2003, his freshman year, he made the District 8-4A All-District baseball team despite batting just .227, and shared the league's Newcomer of the Year award. Holt was a second-team All-District 8-4A inclusion his sophomore year, batting .324 for the season. In 2005, Holt was named defensive player of the year in District 6-4A, and he earned all-district honors in 2006, his senior year.

Holt attended Navarro College in 2007 and 2008. After transferring to Rice University in 2009, he posted a .348 batting average with 12 home runs and 43 runs batted in (RBIs) in 59 games for the Rice Owls. He also led the Owls with 67 runs scored and shared the team lead with 11 stolen bases. In the same season, he was named both to the All-NCAA Regional Team and the All-Silver Glove Trophy Series team. Holt was inducted to the Navarro College athletic hall of fame in 2021.

== Professional career ==
=== Minor leagues ===
The Pittsburgh Pirates selected Holt in the ninth round of the 2009 Major League Baseball draft, one pick before his Rice teammate Ryan Berry. Holt began his professional career with the Pittsburgh Pirates' short season, Class-A affiliate, the State College Spikes, before advancing to the High-A Bradenton Marauders in 2010. His 2010 season was cut short due to injury to his medial collateral ligament, which required surgery. He began the 2011 season with the Pirates' Double-A affiliate, the Altoona Curve. On July 13, 2011, Holt was named the MVP of the Eastern League All-Star Game after hitting a two-run homer in the ninth inning.

Holt opened 2012 with Altoona and later joined Triple-A Indianapolis Indians. He was promoted to the Pittsburgh Pirates from the minors as the major league rosters expanded on September 1.

=== Pittsburgh Pirates (2012) ===
Holt made his Major League debut on September 1, 2012. At the time of his promotion, he had hit a .322 average in 102 games with Altoona and .432 in 24 games for Indianapolis.

On September 4, against the Houston Astros, Holt became only the second Pirates player since 1900 to have a four-hit game within his first four career games in the majors. The only other Pirates player to have a four-hit game so early in his career was Jack Merson, who went 4-for-5 in his second major league game on September 15, 1951. In 24 games, Holt batted .292 with a triple and 3 RBI.

=== Boston Red Sox (2013–2019) ===
==== 2013 ====
On December 26, 2012, Holt was traded to the Boston Red Sox (along with Joel Hanrahan) for Jerry Sands, Stolmy Pimentel, Mark Melancon, and Iván DeJesús, Jr. Holt started the 2013 season with the Triple-A Pawtucket Red Sox. He debuted for Boston after getting called up on July 6 in Anaheim. In 2013, Holt played in 26 games, hitting .203 with 11 RBI. The Red Sox finished the year 97–65, clinching the AL East division. Holt was not active in the playoffs, but the Red Sox went on to win the 2013 World Series.

==== 2014 ====
Holt again started 2014 in Triple-A. He was called up to Boston on May 17, after an injury to Will Middlebrooks, and hit leadoff for the rest of the season. On May 31, against the Tampa Bay Rays at Fenway Park, Holt hit his first Major League home run. On June 1, while starting at first base for the first time in his career, he went 4-for-4 with four doubles, a walk, and two RBIs against the Tampa Bay Rays. On June 8, in order to allow Xander Bogaerts to play third base, Holt moved to left field. He immediately impressed, making a sensational catch on the warning track to rob Ian Kinsler of a hit. On July 9, against the Chicago White Sox, Holt drove in Daniel Nava in the bottom of the ninth inning for the first walk-off hit of his career. By the end of the season, Holt had started games at every position except pitcher and catcher.

==== 2015 ====
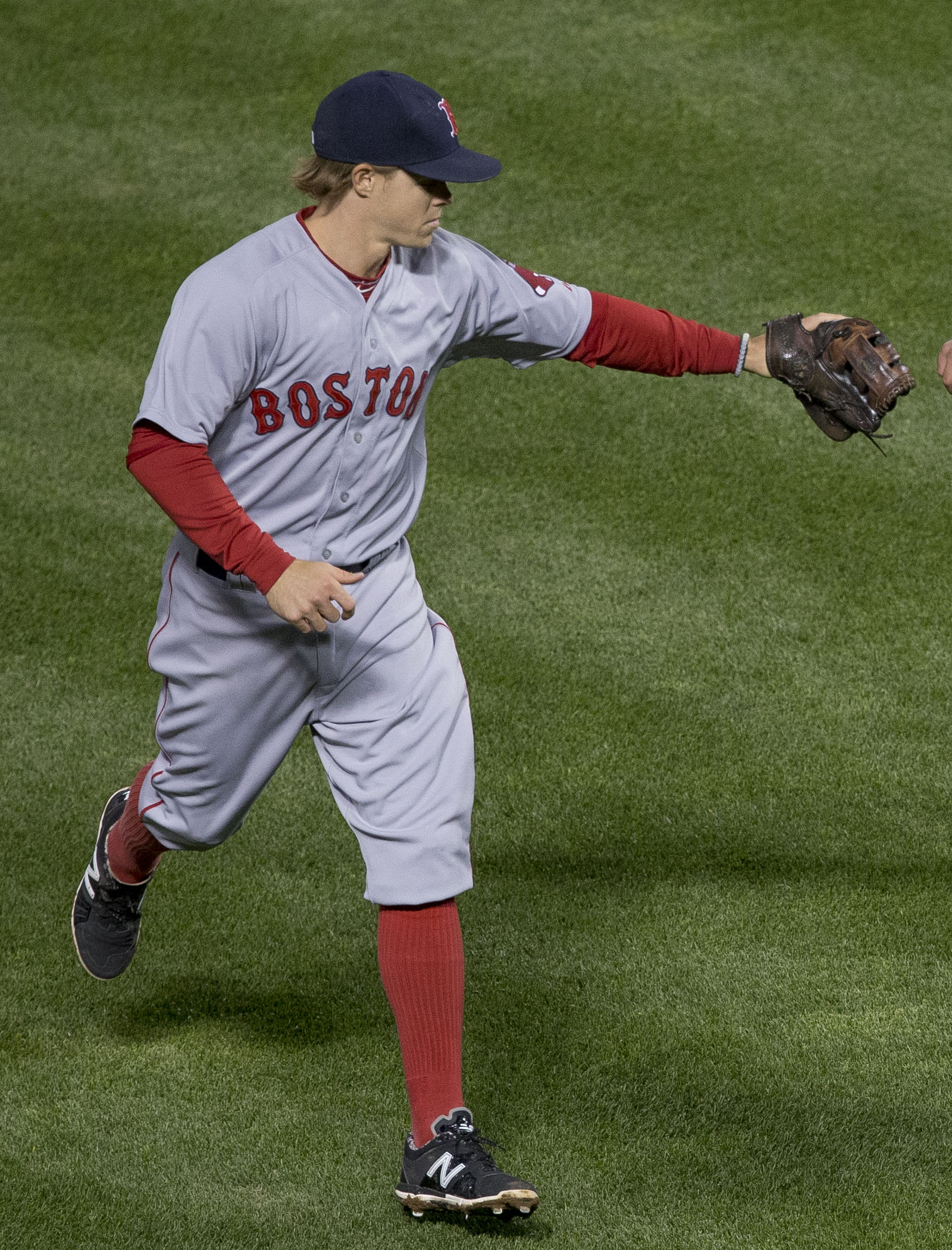
Holt with the Red Sox in 2015

In 2015, Holt made the opening day roster for the first time in his career.

On June 16, Holt hit for the cycle against the Atlanta Braves at Fenway Park. He doubled, singled, and hit a home run off of Julio Teherán, and completed it with a triple in the 8th inning off of Sugar Ray Marimón. In doing so, he became the first Red Sox player to accomplish the feat in 19 years, since John Valentin in 1996.

In July, Holt was chosen to represent the Red Sox in the MLB All-Star Game by Kansas City Royals manager Ned Yost. Holt was the first player selected to an All-Star Game after starting at seven or more positions before the break. In the game, Holt entered as a pinch runner, replacing Mike Trout; Holt successfully stole second base, and later scored. He stayed in the game playing left field and had one at bat, striking out.

For the 2015 regular season, Holt appeared in 129 games, batting .280 with two home runs and 45 RBIs. Defensively, he played 58 games at second base, 35 games in the outfield, 33 games at third base, 11 games at shortstop, 8 games at first base, and one game as designated hitter.

==== 2016 ====
Following the announcement that Wade Boggs' number 26 was to be retired, Holt switched his jersey number to number 12 in 2016. On May 15, Holt was ejected for the first time in his career by home plate umpire and crew chief Joe West for arguing balls and strikes. On May 19, Holt suffered a concussion and was placed on the disabled list. On August 24, Holt returned to the Red Sox, covering third base. For the 2016 regular season, Holt appeared in 94 games and finished with a .255 batting average, 7 home runs, and 34 RBIs.

In the 2016 American League Division Series between the Red Sox and Indians, Holt was named the starting third baseman over Travis Shaw. He batted .400 with a home run and an RBI as Cleveland swept Boston in three games.

==== 2017 ====
Holt again spent time on the disabled list in 2017, due to a concussion and the effects of vertigo. After playing on April 20, Holt was out of the Red Sox lineup until July 16. During the 2017 regular season, Holt appeared in 64 games, batting .200 with no home runs and seven RBIs.

In the 2017 American League Division Series against the Houston Astros, Holt played only in Game 2, pinch running and then staying in the game as second baseman; he did not have a plate appearance.

==== 2018 ====
On September 11, Holt hit a pinch-hit, three-run go-ahead home run off of Ryan Tepera of the Toronto Blue Jays in the seventh inning, giving Boston a lead they would hold onto for a 7–2 win, making them the first team of the year to clinch a postseason berth. Holt finished the campaign with seven home runs and 46 RBIs in 109 games while hitting .277 and playing all infield plus the corner outfield positions during the season. On October 8, Holt became the first player in MLB history to hit for the cycle in the postseason, doing so in a 16–1 rout in Game 3 of the 2018 American League Division Series against the rival New York Yankees. The Red Sox went on to win the World Series over the Los Angeles Dodgers, giving Holt his second career championship title.

==== 2019 ====
Holt started the 2019 season batting 1-for-16 (.063) in six games. On April 6, Holt was placed on the injured list due to a scratched cornea in his right eye. He had rehabilitation assignments with Triple-A Pawtucket starting on April 16 and 26. On April 30, Red Sox manager Alex Cora announced that Holt's rehabilitation had been stopped indefinitely, due to a right shoulder impingement. Holt was sent on a new rehabilitation assignment with Pawtucket on May 15, and then with the Double-A Portland Sea Dogs on May 24. He returned to Boston's active roster on May 27. On July 25, Holt was ejected for the second time in his career by home plate umpire D. J. Reyburn for arguing balls and strikes against the New York Yankees. For the season, Holt appeared in 87 games, batting .297 with three home runs and 31 RBIs. He became a free agent on October 31.

=== Milwaukee Brewers ===
On February 19, 2020, Holt signed a one-year contract with the Milwaukee Brewers that included a club option for 2021. He was designated for assignment on August 22, 2020, after hitting .100/.222/.100 with 9 strikeouts over 39 plate appearances.

=== Washington Nationals ===
Holt signed with the Washington Nationals on August 29, 2020. He played in 20 games for the Nationals, hitting .262/.314/.354 in 65 at bats.

=== Texas Rangers ===
On February 12, 2021, Holt signed a minor league contract with the Texas Rangers organization, his hometown team, that included an invitation to spring training. On March 30, 2021, Holt was selected to the 40-man roster. He used a few Eephus pitches during a relief appearance on August 7, 2021, one registering the slowest MLB pitch since at least 2008 (the pitch-tracking era) at 30.1 miles per hour (48.4 km/h). In 76 games in 2021, Holt hit .209/.281/.298/.579 with 2 home runs and 23 RBI.

=== Atlanta Braves ===
On March 20, 2022, Holt signed a minor-league contract with the Atlanta Braves. On March 31, he requested and was granted his release. On October 27, 2022, Holt announced his retirement through an Instagram post.

== Honors and awards ==
- 2010 FSL Mid-Season All-Star
- 2011 EAS Mid-Season All-Star
- 2011 EAS All-Star Game Top Star
- 2012 EAS Mid-Season All-Star
- 2012 MiLB.com Organization All-Star
- 2012 EAS Post-Season All-Star
- 2013 World Series champion
- 2015 MLB All-Star
- 2018 World Series champion
- 3-time Roberto Clemente Award nominee (2015, 2016, 2018)

== Personal life ==
Holt married Lakyn Pennington on November 9, 2013. The couple have two sons, born in December 2016 and September 2020. Holt worked with The Jimmy Fund, serving five consecutive seasons as Jimmy Fund captain for the Red Sox, to assist with fund raising and cancer awareness. On August 14, 2024, he was announced as the new co-chair of The Jimmy Fund, serving alongside NESN personality Tom Caron.

== See also ==
- List of Major League Baseball players to hit for the cycle

Achievements
Preceded by Michael Cuddyer; Charlie Blackmon	Hitting for the cycle June 16, 2015; October 8, 2018	Succeeded by Shin-Soo Choo; Jorge Polanco
