= Harlan Page Beach =

American missionary in China

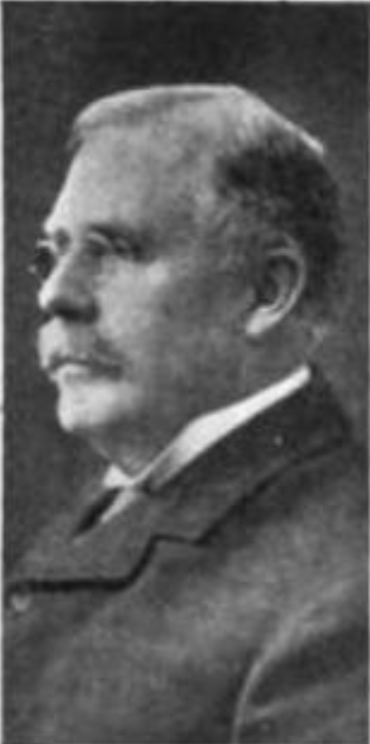

Harlan Page Beach (April 4, 1854 – March 4, 1933) was an American missionary, brother of David Nelson Beach. He was born at South Orange, N. J., and graduated at Phillips Academy, Andover, Massachusetts in 1874, Yale in 1878, and at the Andover Theological Seminary (1883). He was missionary to China from 1883 to 1890 and at the head of the School for Christian Workers in Springfield, Mass. from 1892 to 1895, when he became educational secretary of the Student Volunteer Movement for Foreign Missions. He became professor of the theory and practice of missions at Yale University in 1906. His works include:

- The Cross in the Land of the Trident (1895)
- Knights of the Labarum (1896)
- Dawn on the Hills of T'ang (1900)
- Geography and Atlas of Protestant Missions (1801–03)
- India and Christian Opportunity (1904)

Harlan Beach became an emeritus professor at Yale in 1921. He died in Florida in 1933.
