= John Robert Beach =

American politician (1871–1954)

Member of the Minnesota House of Representatives from the 4th district
- In office January 6, 1931 – January 2, 1933

Personal details
- Born: June 10, 1871 Olmsted County, Minnesota, U.S.
- Died: September 11, 1954 (aged 83) Olmsted County, Minnesota, U.S.
- Education: Darlings Business College
- Occupation: Politician, farmer

John Robert Beach (June 10, 1871 – September 11, 1954) was an American politician and farmer who served in the Minnesota House of Representatives from 1931 to 1933, representing the 4th legislative district of Minnesota in the 47th Minnesota Legislature.

== Early life and education ==
Beach was born on a farm in Olmsted County, Minnesota, on June 10, 1871. He attended common schools in the county, as well as Darlings Business College.

== Career ==
Beach served in the Minnesota House of Representatives from 1931 to 1933, representing the 4th legislative district of Minnesota in the 47th Minnesota Legislature.

During his time in office, Beach served on the following committees:

- Agriculture and Horticulture
- Dairy Products and Live Stock
- Education
- Public Health and Hospitals
- Temperance
- University and State Schools

Beach's tenure began on January 6, 1931, and concluded on January 2, 1933. His district included representation for Olmsted County.

Outside of the Minnesota Legislature, Beach was a farmer.

== Personal life and death ==
Beach was married. He resided in Stewartville, Minnesota.

Beach died at the age of 83 in Olmsted County, Minnesota, on September 11, 1954.

Minnesota House of Representatives
| Preceded by — | Member of the Minnesota House of Representatives from the 4th district 1931–1933 | Succeeded by — |
