= Steven Beach =

American psychologist

- Born: May 29, 1956 (age 70)
- Education: Stony Brook University
- Scientific career
- Fields: Clinical psychology
- Workplaces: University of Georgia
- Thesis: The assessment of commitment (1985)

Steven R. H. Beach (born May 29, 1956) is Distinguished Research Professor in the Department of Psychology at the University of Georgia, where he also serves as co-director of the Center for Family Research. He is known for his research on marriage and depression.
