= William Beach =

William Beach may refer to:

- Bill Beach (rower) (1850–1935), Australian sculler
- Bill Beach (jazz musician) (born 1953), American jazz musician
- Bill Beach (rockabilly musician) (1932–2024), American musician
- William Beach (British politician) (1783–1856)
- William Beach (American politician) (c. 1815–1860)
- William Beach (economist), commissioner of U.S. Bureau of Labor Statistics
- William Dorrance Beach (1856–1932), American army officer
- William Henry Beach (1871–1952), British Army officer
- William Wither Bramston Beach (1826–1901), English politician

== See also ==
- William Beech (disambiguation)
