= Stephenville, Texas =

City in Texas, US

Stephenville
- City
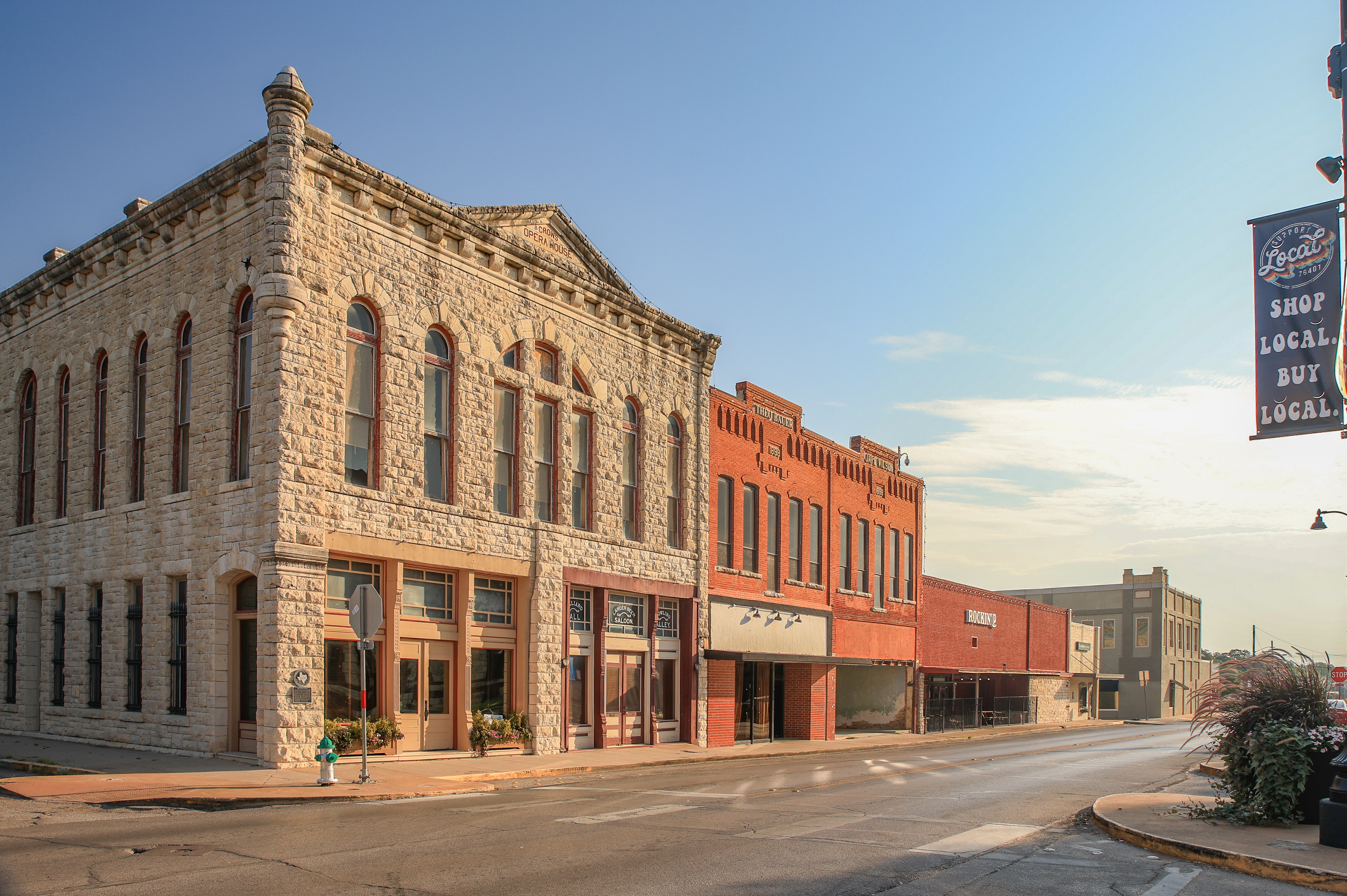
- Downtown Stephenville, Texas

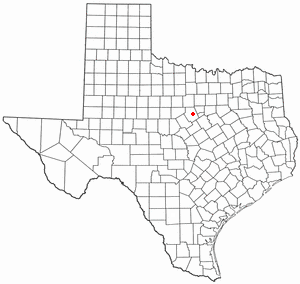
- Location of Stephenville, Texas

- Coordinates: 32°12′35″N 98°14′15″W
- Country: United States
- State: Texas
- County: Erath

Government
  - Type: Council-Manager
  - City Council: Mayor

Area
  - Total: 11.91 sq mi (30.85 km^{2})
  - Land: 11.89 sq mi (30.79 km^{2})
  - Water: 0.023 sq mi (0.06 km^{2})
- Elevation: 1,342 ft (409 m)

Population (2020)
  - Total: 20,897
  - Density: 1,440/sq mi (556.1/km^{2})
- Time zone: UTC-6 (Central (CST))
  - Summer (DST): UTC-5 (CDT)
- ZIP codes: 76401-76402
- Area code: 254
- FIPS code: 48-70208
- GNIS feature ID: 2411977
- Website: Stephenville, Texas

Stephenville is a city in and the county seat of Erath County, Texas, United States. It sits on the North Bosque River, which rises nearby. Founded in 1854, it is home to Tarleton State University. Stephenville's population was 20,847 as of the 2020 census, and it is the principal city in the Stephenville micropolitan statistical area. Stephenville is among several communities that call themselves the "Cowboy Capital of the World".

== History ==
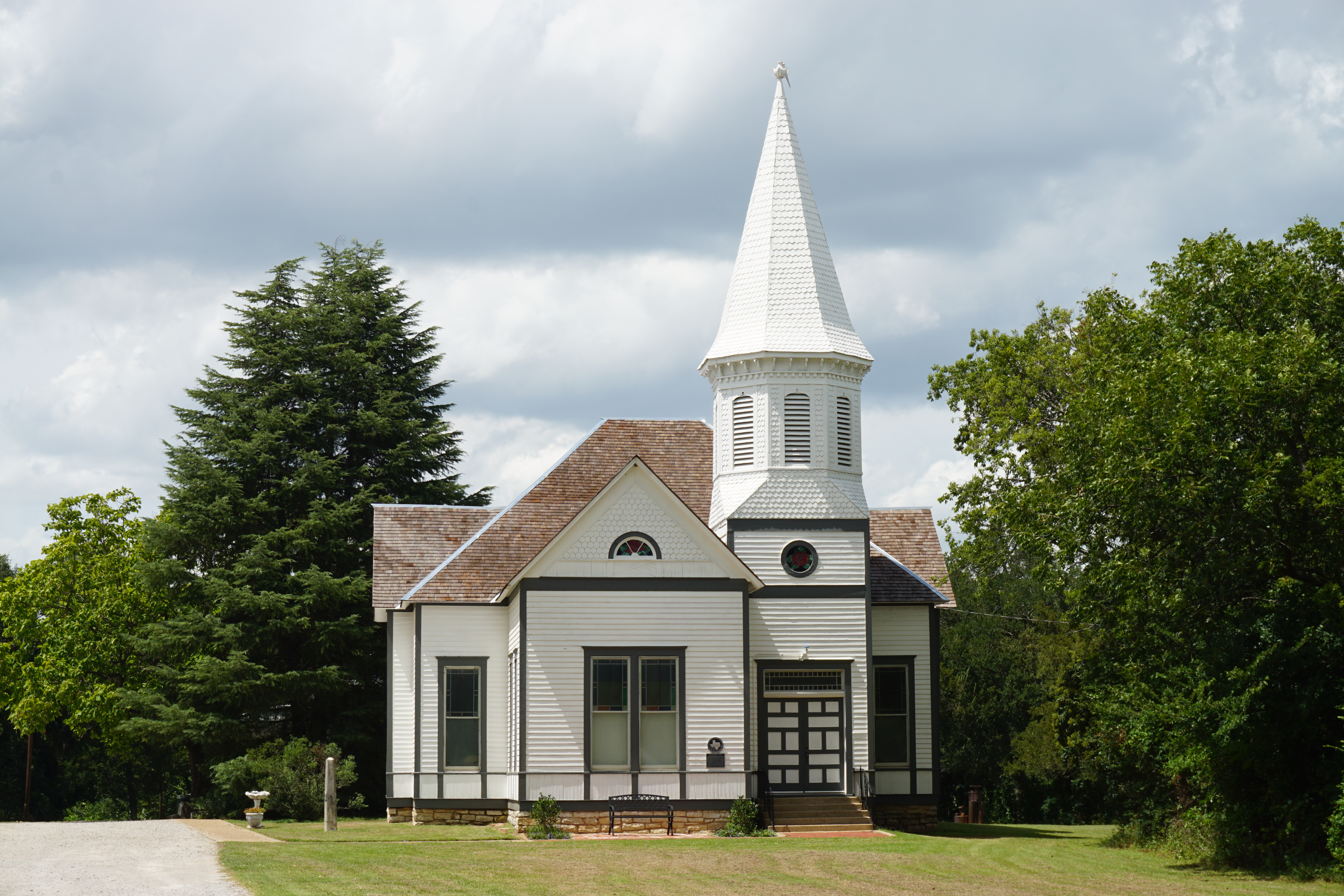
Presbyterian Church at the Stephenville Historical Museum

Stephenville was founded by and named after John M. Stephen, who settled there in 1854, and donated the land for the townsite laid out by George B. Erath when the county was organized in 1856. In the first two years of its settlement, the population increased to 776. The population then declined until 1871, because the townsite was in Comanche territory and raids were common, and because the hardships of the American Civil War led citizens to leave. The population grew after Stephenville became an agricultural and livestock center. Coal mining also became important to the area in 1886, and was a major segment of the economy for 30 years.

Stephenville was incorporated in 1889, with the arrival of the Fort Worth and Rio Grande Railway. In the 1890s, many of the buildings around the town square were built, Tarleton State University opened, and the community's two newspapers merged to become the Empire-Tribune, which is still in operation. In February 1907, the Stephenville North and South Texas Railway was chartered by Stephenville and Hamilton business interests, which sold the line in 1910 to the St. Louis Southwestern Railway of Texas system. In the 20th century, industry became an important part of Stephenville, and the population has steadily increased since the 1920s.

=== Stephenville lights ===
In January 2008, dozens of people in Stephenville reported seeing patterns of lights in the night sky, an event which the military explained was a misidentified training maneuver. Some described it as a single large unidentified flying object. The Air Force Reserve issued a statement from the NAS Fort Worth Joint Reserve Base that jets from the 457th Fighter Squadron were in military airspace designated for training during the time people reported seeing the lights. The F-16s had been engaged in training maneuvers and dropping countermeasure flares used to confuse heat-seeking missiles. Following news reports of the UFO sighting, "media calls came from all over the world", and local police Constable Lee Roy Gaitan gave more than 100 interviews. The town reacted in a "UFO frenzy"; T-shirts proclaiming the town the "Alien Capital of the World" and "Erath County — the New Roswell", were rushed into production, and the local high school suddenly received $7,000 for college scholarships.

== Geography ==
According to the United States Census Bureau, the city has an area of 11.89 square miles (30.8 km^{2}), of which 11.89 sq mi (30.8 km^{2}) are land and 0.04 sq mi (0.10 km^{2}) is covered by water.

Stephenville is served by three major US highways – US Highway 377, US Highway 281, and US Highway 67 (the last of which joins US Hwy 377).

=== Climate ===
Stephenville's climate is characterized by hot, humid summers and generally mild-to-cool winters. According to the Köppen climate classification, Stephenville has a humid subtropical climate, Cfa on weather maps.

Climate data for Stephenville, Texas (1991–2020 normals, extremes 1921–1932, 1941–present)
Month	Jan	Feb	Mar	Apr	May	Jun	Jul	Aug	Sep	Oct	Nov	Dec	Year
Record high °F (°C)	87 (31)	96 (36)	95 (35)	103 (39)	103 (39)	109 (43)	111 (44)	110 (43)	110 (43)	103 (39)	92 (33)	89 (32)	111 (44)
Mean maximum °F (°C)	78.2 (25.7)	82.3 (27.9)	86.3 (30.2)	90.8 (32.7)	94.3 (34.6)	97.9 (36.6)	101.5 (38.6)	101.8 (38.8)	97.8 (36.6)	92.2 (33.4)	83.3 (28.5)	78.7 (25.9)	103.5 (39.7)
Mean daily maximum °F (°C)	59.1 (15.1)	63.1 (17.3)	70.4 (21.3)	78.6 (25.9)	85.6 (29.8)	93.1 (33.9)	97.3 (36.3)	97.6 (36.4)	90.2 (32.3)	80.5 (26.9)	68.8 (20.4)	60.5 (15.8)	78.7 (25.9)
Daily mean °F (°C)	45.0 (7.2)	49.0 (9.4)	56.4 (13.6)	64.4 (18.0)	72.7 (22.6)	80.4 (26.9)	84.0 (28.9)	83.6 (28.7)	76.3 (24.6)	66.0 (18.9)	54.9 (12.7)	46.8 (8.2)	65.0 (18.3)
Mean daily minimum °F (°C)	30.9 (−0.6)	34.9 (1.6)	42.4 (5.8)	50.2 (10.1)	59.9 (15.5)	67.6 (19.8)	70.6 (21.4)	69.6 (20.9)	62.5 (16.9)	51.5 (10.8)	41.1 (5.1)	33.1 (0.6)	51.2 (10.7)
Mean minimum °F (°C)	19.0 (−7.2)	21.4 (−5.9)	25.8 (−3.4)	35.3 (1.8)	45.4 (7.4)	59.0 (15.0)	65.3 (18.5)	63.4 (17.4)	50.1 (10.1)	36.1 (2.3)	25.9 (−3.4)	20.0 (−6.7)	15.0 (−9.4)
Record low °F (°C)	−2 (−19)	0 (−18)	9 (−13)	25 (−4)	36 (2)	51 (11)	50 (10)	50 (10)	33 (1)	21 (−6)	11 (−12)	−8 (−22)	−8 (−22)
Average precipitation inches (mm)	1.84 (47)	2.16 (55)	2.82 (72)	2.91 (74)	4.97 (126)	3.33 (85)	1.99 (51)	2.96 (75)	3.32 (84)	3.32 (84)	2.33 (59)	2.18 (55)	34.13 (867)
Average snowfall inches (cm)	0.4 (1.0)	0.0 (0.0)	0.0 (0.0)	0.0 (0.0)	0.0 (0.0)	0.0 (0.0)	0.0 (0.0)	0.0 (0.0)	0.0 (0.0)	0.0 (0.0)	0.0 (0.0)	0.3 (0.76)	0.7 (1.8)
Average precipitation days (≥ 0.01 in)	6.1	6.4	7.7	5.8	7.9	6.0	4.9	5.2	5.9	7.1	5.7	5.6	74.3
Average snowy days (≥ 0.1 in)	0.3	0.2	0.0	0.0	0.0	0.0	0.0	0.0	0.0	0.0	0.0	0.2	0.7
Source: NOAA

== Demographics ==
Historical population
Census	Pop.	Note	%±
1860	120		—
1880	725		—
1890	909		25.4%
1900	1,902		109.2%
1910	2,561		34.6%
1920	3,891		51.9%
1930	3,944		1.4%
1940	4,768		20.9%
1950	7,155		50.1%
1960	7,359		2.9%
1970	9,277		26.1%
1980	11,881		28.1%
1990	13,502		13.6%
2000	14,921		10.5%
2010	17,123		14.8%
2020	20,897		22.0%
U.S. Decennial Census

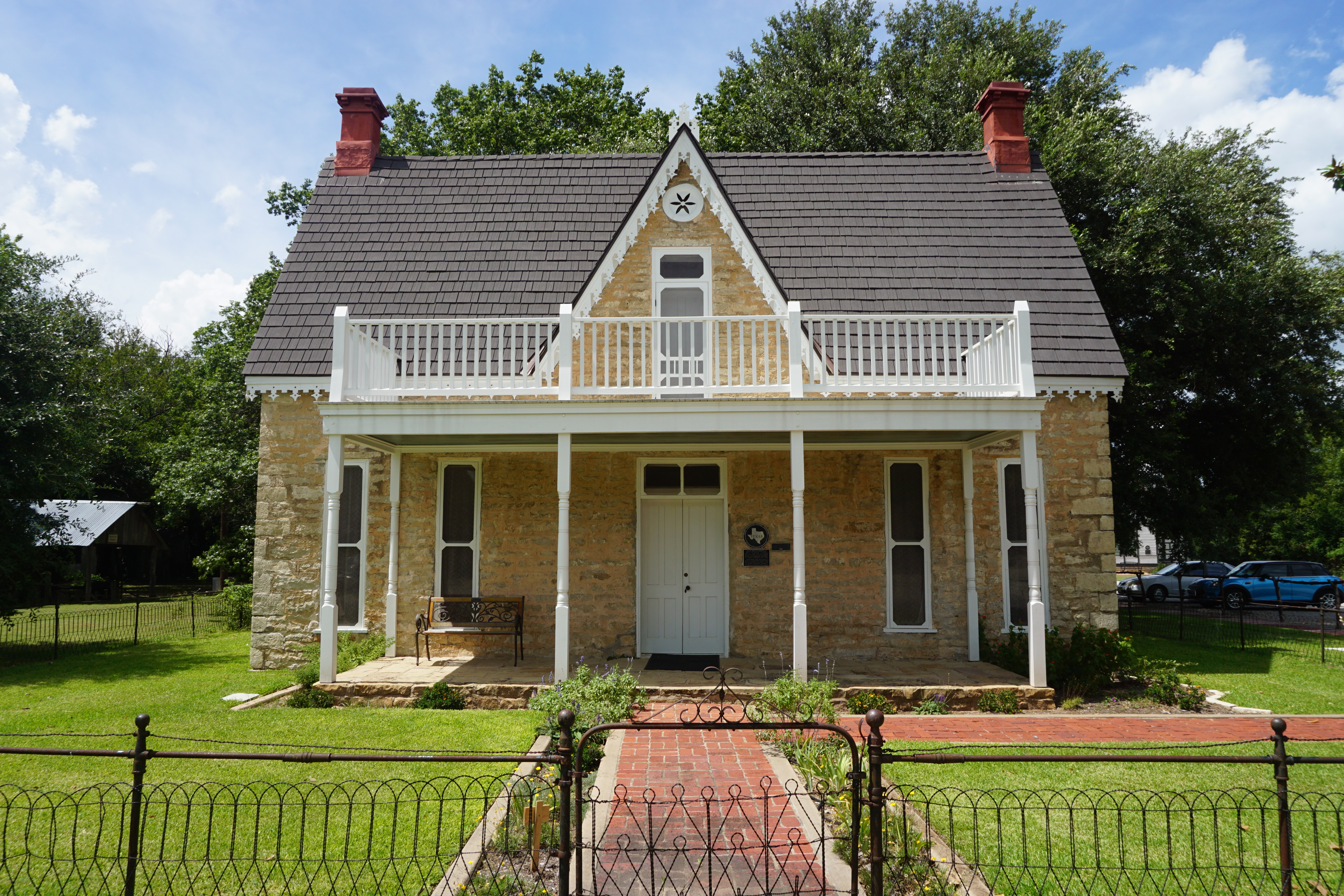
Historical House Museum in Stephenville is an 1869 Victorian home with period furnishings and relics of area history, and a carriage house and a reconstructed log cabin.

=== Racial and ethnic composition ===
Stephenville city, Texas – Racial and ethnic composition Note: the US Census treats Hispanic/Latino as an ethnic category. This table excludes Latinos from the racial categories and assigns them to a separate category. Hispanics/Latinos may be of any race.
Race / Ethnicity (NH = Non-Hispanic)	Pop 2000	Pop 2010	Pop 2020	% 2000	% 2010	% 2020
White alone (NH)	12,686	13,634	14,257	85.02%	79.62%	68.23%
Black or African American alone (NH)	217	363	1,122	1.45%	2.12%	5.37%
Native American or Alaska Native alone (NH)	55	67	98	0.37%	0.39%	0.47%
Asian alone (NH)	96	196	279	0.64%	1.14%	1.34%
Native Hawaiian or Pacific Islander alone (NH)	7	10	6	0.05%	0.06%	0.03%
Other race alone (NH)	3	8	44	0.02%	0.05%	0.21%
Multiracial (NH)	132	155	749	0.88%	0.91%	3.58%
Hispanic or Latino (any race)	1,725	2,690	4,342	11.56%	15.71%	20.78%
Total	14,921	17,123	20,897	100.00%	100.00%	100.00%

=== 2020 census ===
As of the 2020 census, Stephenville had a population of 20,897 people. The median age of was.2 years; 17.6% of the residents were under 18 and 11.7% were 65 or older. The female/male ratio was 1:0.879 overall and 1:0.851 for those 18 and over. Almost all of the residents lived in urban areas, while 1.0% lived in rural areas. Of the 7,474 households in Stephenville, 26.1% had children under 18 living in them, 34.1% were married-couple households, 24.6% had a male householder with no spouse or partner present, and 33.1% had a female householder with no spouse or partner present; 33.8% of all households were made up of individuals, and 10.2% had someone living alone who was 65 or older. The city had 8,482 housing units, of which 11.9% were vacant; the homeowner vacancy rate was 1.1% and the rental vacancy rate was 13.7%.

Racial composition as of the 2020 census
Race	Number	Percentage
White	15,737	75.3%
Black or African American	1,161	5.6%
American Indian and Alaska Native	195	0.9%
Asian	283	1.4%
Native Hawaiian and other Pacific Islander	7	0.0%
Some other race	1,461	7.0%
Two or more races	2,053	9.8%

=== Other statistics ===
According to Data USA, 95.5% of residents were U.S. citizens, the median household income was $48,602 (a 3.06% increase from $47,161 the previous year), and Tarleton State University awarded 3,536 degrees in 2021. That source also reports that no households reported speaking a non-English language at home as their primary shared language, the median property value was $153,400, the homeownership rate was 45.9%, the average commute time was 16.1 minutes, and the average car ownership was two vehicles per household.

== Education ==
Stephenville is served by the Stephenville Independent School District and two colleges: Tarleton State University and Ranger College.

== Notable people ==
- Jessie G. Beach (1887–1954), paleontologist and museum aide, born in Stephenville
- Art Briles, former football coach at Baylor University
- Milton Brown, recording artist, cofounder of Western Swing born in Stephenville
- Giovannie and the Hired Guns, American country rock band
- Leon Hale, newspaper writer, born in Stephenville
- Dustin Hodge, television producer and writer
- Brock Holt, professional baseball player, graduated from Stephenville High School
- Jewel, singer-songwriter, lived on a Stephenville-area ranch
- Kevin Kolb, NFL quarterback
- Jess Lockwood, world champion bull rider
- J.B. Mauney, world champion bull rider
- Ty Murray, world champion rodeo cowboy
- Justin Roberts, documentary filmmaker and former U.S. Army chaplain
- Jim Sharp, world champion bull rider
- Jarrett Stidham, NFL quarterback with the New England Patriots and the Denver Broncos
- Carey Wentworth Styles, newspaperman, founder of The Atlanta Constitution
- Hugh Wolfe, professional football player
- Hudson Westbrook, country music singer and songwriter
