= David Nelson Beach =

American theologian

David Nelson Beach (November 30, 1848 – October 18, 1926) was an American theologian, born at South Orange, N. J., and a brother of Harlan Page Beach.

David Beach graduated from Yale College in 1872 and from the Yale Divinity School in 1876. In the same year he was ordained a Congregational minister and became pastor at Westerly, R. I. He subsequently served in pastorates at Wakefield, Mass., Cambridge, Mass., Minneapolis, and Denver. From 1903–1921, he was President and Professor of Sacred Rhetoric at Bangor Theological Seminary in Bangor, Maine. He took a prominent part in civic and social movements and during his residence at Cambridge was prominent in ridding that city of saloons. He advocated the adoption of a modified Norwegian liquor system in Massachusetts, and became known as an enthusiastic worker for church unity and a better theology.

Beach retired from the Bangor seminary to Southington, Connecticut, where he died in 1926.

== Published writings ==
- Plain Words on Our Lord's Work (1886)
- The Newer Religious Thinking (1893)
- The Intent of Jesus (1896)
- Statement of Belief (1897)
- The Annie Laurie Mine (1903)
- Meanings of the Battle of Bennington (1903)
