= The Long and the Short and the Tall =

The Long and the Short and the Tall may refer to:

- The Long and the Short and the Tall (play), a 1959 play, directed by Lindsay Anderson, starring Peter O' Toole and Robert Shaw
- The Long and the Short and the Tall (film), a 1961 film, directed by Leslie Norman, starring Laurence Harvey, David McCallum, Richard Harris and Richard Todd
- "Bless 'Em All" (also known as "The Long And The Short And The Tall"), a 1917 song by Fred Godfrey, first recorded by George Formby in 1940
