= British merchant seamen of World War II =

British Merchant Seamen of World War II
- Country: United Kingdom
- Branch: Merchant Navy
- Role: Transportation of men and material
- Part of: Ministry of War Transport
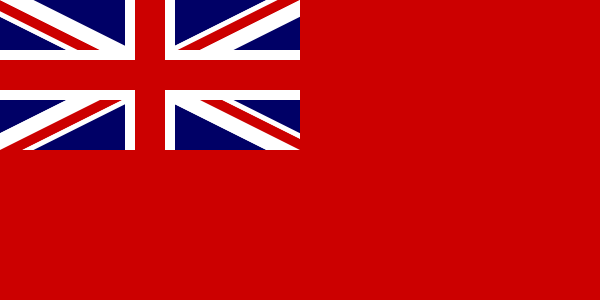
- Colors: The British Merchant Navy Ensign

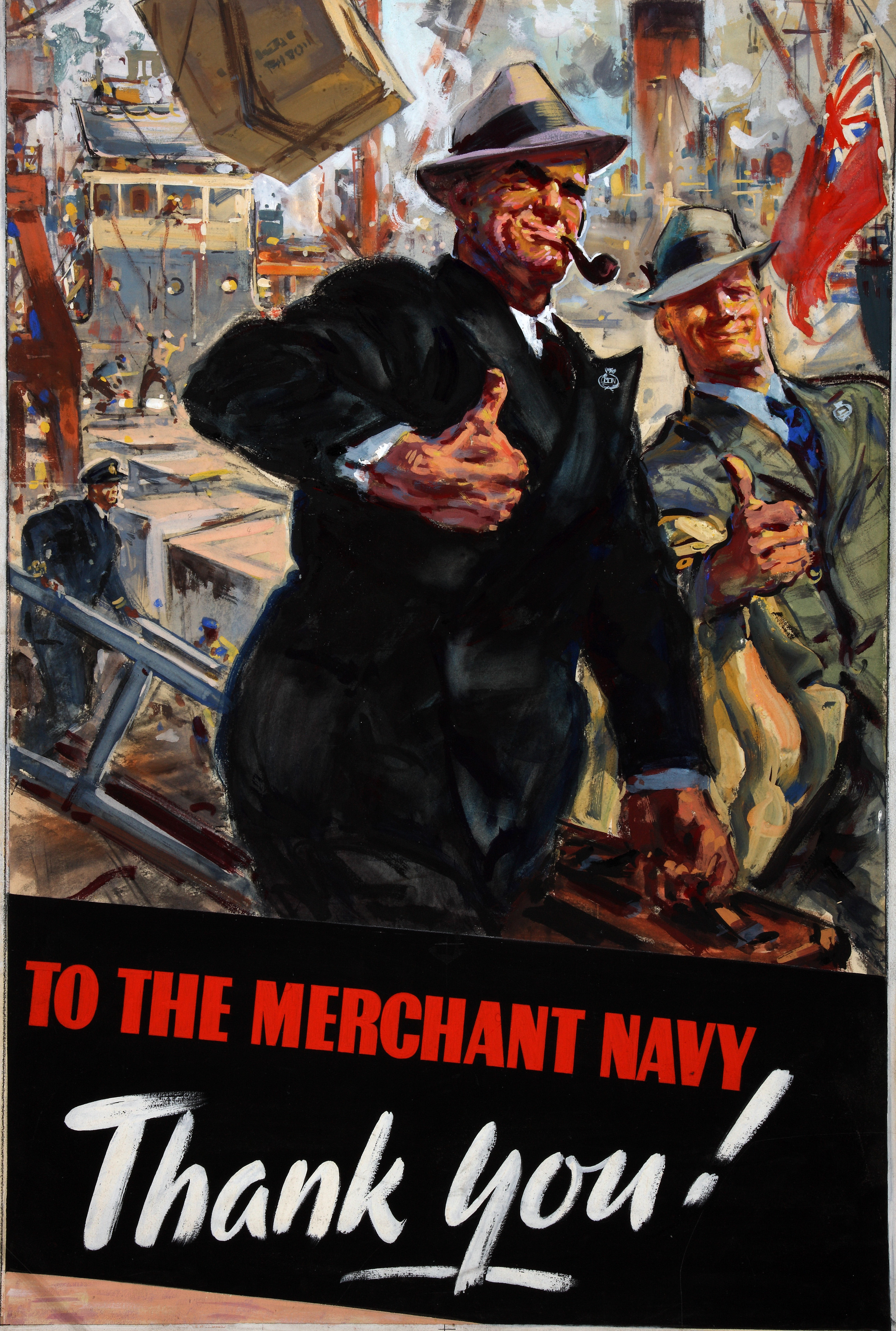
Propaganda poster; note the "MN" buttonhole badge

Merchant seamen crewed the ships of the British Merchant Navy which kept the United Kingdom supplied with raw materials, arms, ammunition, fuel, food and all of the necessities of a nation at war throughout World War II — literally enabling the country to defend itself. In doing this, they sustained a considerably greater casualty rate than almost every other branch of the armed services and suffered great hardship. Seamen were aged from fourteen through to their late seventies.

The office of the Registrar General of Shipping and Seamen calculated that 144,000 merchant seamen were serving aboard British registered merchant ships at the outbreak of World War II and that up to 185,000 men served in the Merchant Navy during the war. 36,749 seamen were lost to enemy action, 5,720 were taken prisoner and 4,707 were wounded, totaling 47,176 casualties, a minimum casualty rate of over 25 per cent. Gabe Thomas, the former Registrar General of Shipping and Seamen (Great Britain) stated that "27 per cent of merchant seamen died through enemy action".

== Merchant Seamen ==
Merchant seamen are civilians who elect to work at sea. Their working practices in 1939 had changed little in hundreds of years. They "signed on" to sail aboard a ship for a voyage or succession of voyages and after being "paid off" at the end of that time were free to either sign on for a further engagement if they were required, or to take unpaid "leave" before "signing on" aboard another ship or otherwise to settle and work ashore.

Merchant seamen were professional seamen sailing in a wide range of roles from the youngest "Boy" rating learning his chosen profession through to the qualified Master Mariner (locally referred to as the captain), all were merchant seamen regardless of role or rank.

On one engagement a seaman could be a member of the crew of the 81,000-ton ocean liner RMS Queen Mary serving as a troopship between Australia and England and on their next engagement they might be sailing in a 400-ton coastal collier delivering coal from the collieries of the north-east of England to London's power stations on the Thames Estuary. His engagement aboard ship might be for two or three weeks or for twelve months or more away from England depending upon the work the ship was to carry out.

Merchant Seamen aboard British registered vessels during World War II were both male and female and might be registered with the British, Indian, Canadian, Australian or New Zealand Merchant navies, or the Fishing Fleet.

The youngest merchant seamen were invariably "Boy" ratings, Deck Boys, Galley Boys, Mess Room Boys, Stewards Boys or Cabin Boys and were typically 14 or 15 years of age.

Two brothers, Ken and Ray Lewis from Cardiff, were killed sailing together aboard the SS Fiscus aged 14 and 15 years respectively when it was sunk by U-99.

Frequent cases of family members sailing together occurred but this had tragic results when ships were sunk; for example three members of the Attard family from Gozo, Malta died on 15 September 1941 when the SS Newbury was lost, three Roberts brothers also perished on 23 June 1941 when the SS Arakaka went down. Although sailing aboard different ships was not a failsafe solution, three sons of the Metcalf family from Sunderland were lost, three sons of the Nicol family from Edinburgh and three of the Stiff family from Barry, Glamorgan all died.

The oldest known serving merchant seamen were in their seventies, Chief Cook Santan Martins of SS Calabria was aged 79 when he was killed in action in her sinking by U-103 in December 1940.

== The Merchant Navy ==
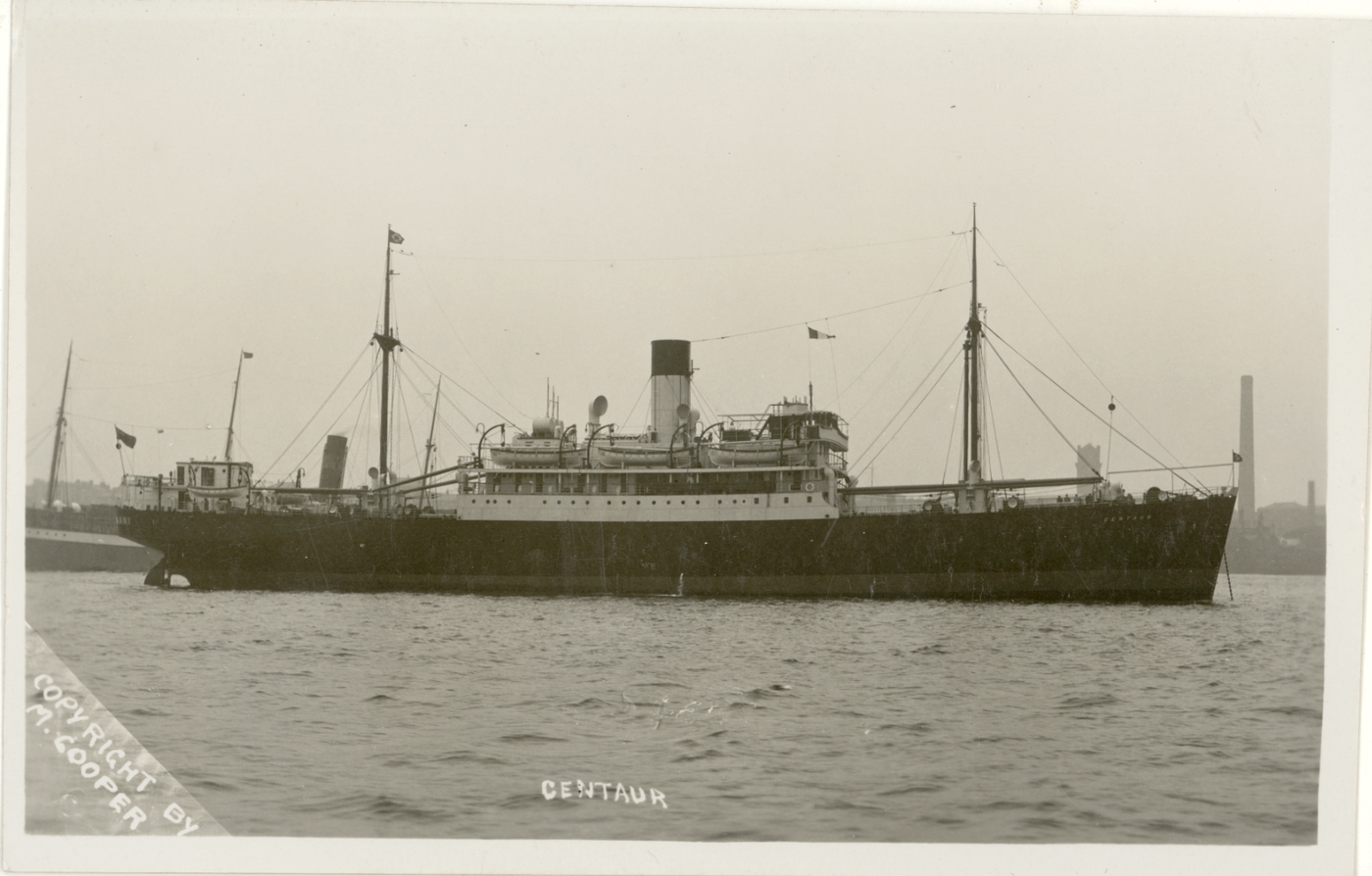
A merchant ship in 1943

The British Merchant Navy of World War II, previously known as the "Merchant Service" or "Mercantile Marine" comprised the merchant shipping registered in Great Britain and independently operated by British commercial shipping companies. Those vessels carried cargo to and from the country and those of the Commonwealth to sustain its war effort. Following the heroism and hardships endured by seamen of the "Mercantile Marine" in World War I King George V coined the title Merchant Navy in recognition. The Prince of Wales adopted the title "Master of the Merchant Navy and Fishing Fleets" in 1928. In World War II the title Merchant Navy came into normal usage and with Royal approval, a small silver buttonhole badge was produced for the non-uniformed merchant seamen from January 1940 bearing the letters "MN".

The Ministry of War Transport (MoWT) was a department of the British Government formed on 1 May 1941 when Lord Leathers was appointed Minister of War Transport to control transportation policy and resources. It was formed by merging the Ministry of Shipping and the Ministry of Transport, bringing responsibility for both shipping and land transport to a single department, and easing problems of co-ordination of transport in wartime. From this point onwards the "MoWT" decided upon the route sailed and the cargo carried by every ship.

== Merchant seamen at war, 1939 – May 1941 ==
From the outbreak of war in September 1939, individual seamen could decide if they wished to sail and risk attack by German forces, or in the face of extremely high losses, if they wished to change their occupation to work ashore or otherwise enlist in the Armed Forces. Although sailors in the Merchant Navy were given this choice, the reality was that the Royal Navy was desperately short of men, and discouraged leaving the Merchant Navy; once sailors had signed a T124x agreement, the Royal Navy could move them to any ship, give them Royal Navy training, and use their services under the white ensign. In addition, existing Merchant Navy members did not know how dangerous service would be at this time. Once they signed a T124x agreement, they had no choice but to continue to serve. The losses of shipping vessels and their crews in 1940 and 1941 neared a peak, with 779 ships sunk and 16,654 seamen killed or missing, approximately 49 per cent of all British merchant sailors. Fortunately for Great Britain, the great majority of seamen continued to take the risk, and the nation's war supplies and food continued to arrive.

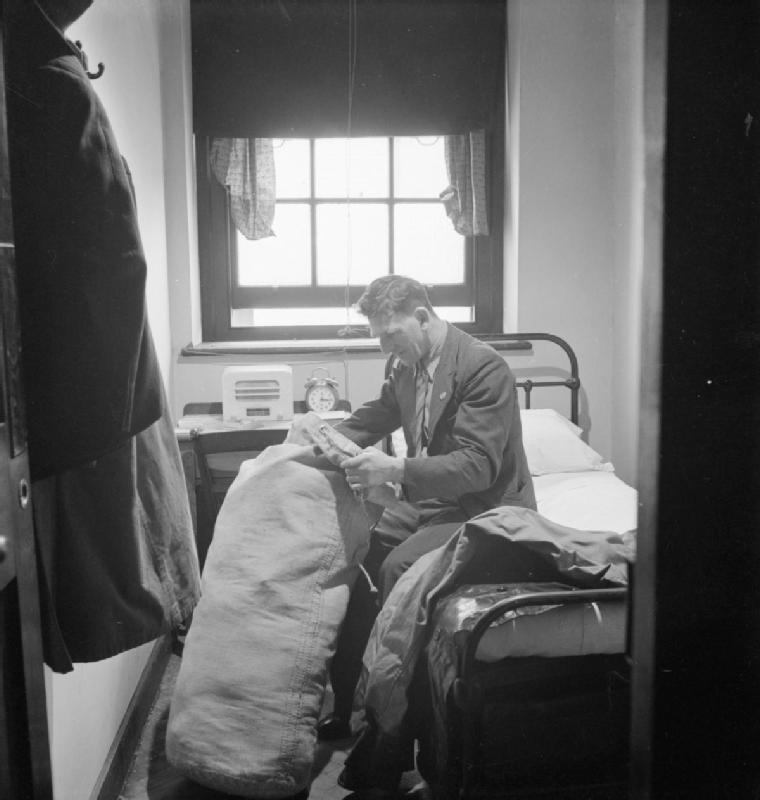
A merchant seaman in the London "Red Ensign" Seamen's Home, 1942

Until May 1941, merchant seamen sailing aboard British vessels that were attacked and sunk by enemy action received no pay from the moment the ship capsized. Many seaman fortunate enough to survive sinkings spent days or weeks in open lifeboats hoping for rescue; despite the brutal conditions sailors faced in lifeboats, this time was regarded as "non-working time," and the seaman was not paid; the reasoning given being that their employer, in the shipping company who had owned the lost vessel, no longer required their services.

== Emergency Work Order – May 1941 ==
In May 1941, "Emergency Work (Merchant Navy) Order, Notice No. M198" was passed by the British Parliament in recognition of the desperate situation facing Great Britain. Under this new order, a Merchant Navy Reserve Pool was established, which was to ensure that available seamen were allocated to ships which needed crew, it required seamen to continue to serve for the duration of the war, they were guaranteed a wage for that period including time spent in lifeboats or in captivity and it provided for two days paid leave earned per month served.

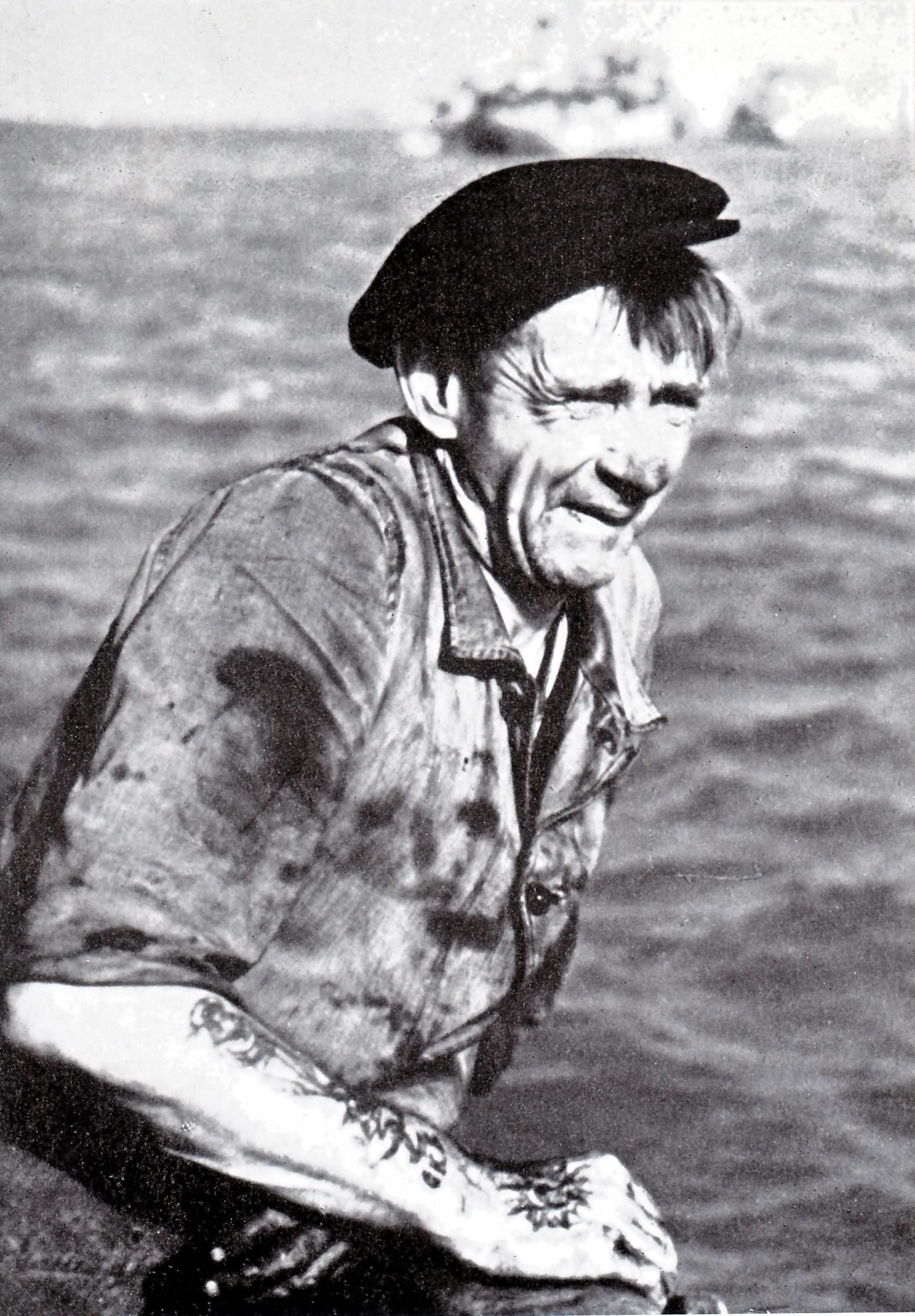
A veteran merchant seaman

== Merchant seamen 1939–1945 ==
The British Merchant Navy was the largest in the world and required more crew than Great Britain had merchant seamen, as a result large numbers of Indian, Chinese and West African seamen were engaged to crew ships which regularly traded from Great Britain to ports in those areas. Additionally men from Commonwealth countries sailed aboard British ships as did many others from Scandinavia, the Netherlands and most other countries of the world, including Germany and Japan.

Traditionally it was a very open society, almost free of distinctions of class, race, religion, age or colour. The mixture of nationalities making the atmosphere similar to a "Foreign Legion". Some were sailing under aliases to escape family problems, legal issues or simply because they wished to begin new lives.

Many seamen came from British port towns and cities and followed their fathers and uncles to sea, often sailing with family members.

It was not unusual for men to have no fixed abode and to live in "Seamen's Hostels" in port for a week or two before their next trip.

== Women at sea ==
Traditionally, women sailed as "merchant seamen" aboard ocean liners and larger passenger carrying vessels, usually as chief stewardesses, stewardesses or assistant stewardesses but also working in the laundries and in nursing (as nursing sisters), in child care roles and as assistants in the on-board shops until the reduction in passenger traffic removed all but a tiny number. Approaching 50 died when their ships were attacked and sunk during World War II. One example was Lily (or Lillie) Ann Green, a stewardess awarded a King's Commendation for Brave Conduct for her bravery when the SS Andalucia Star was torpedoed and sunk off West Africa in 1942.

A small number of women sailed as radio officers, including the radio officer of the SS Viggo Hansteen. Maud Elizabeth Stean of the Canadian Merchant Navy, who died on 14 August 1944, aged 28, and one or two women sailed as "engineer officers". For example Victoria Drummond, Second Engineer of SS Bonita, who was awarded an MBE and a Lloyd's War Medal for Bravery for her services when the ship was attacked and bombed by the Luftwaffe.

== Naval Auxiliary personnel ==
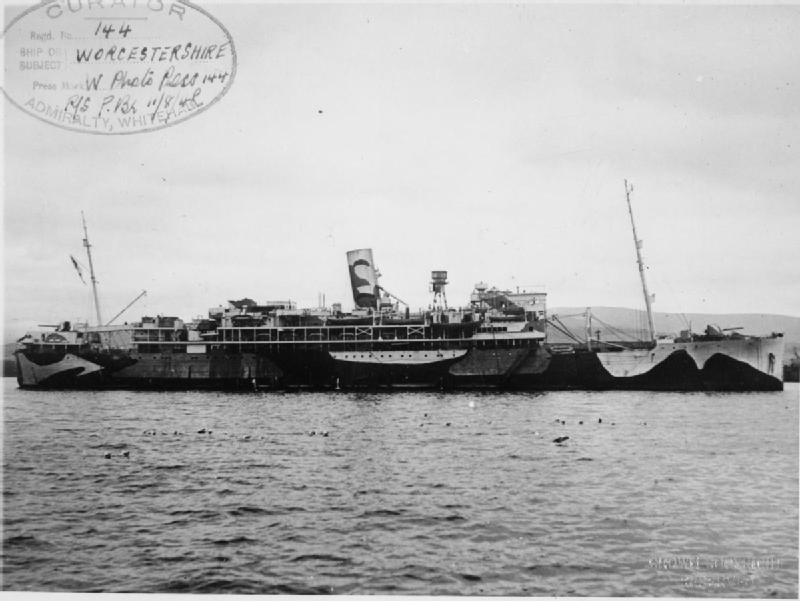
Ocean liner Worcestershire camouflaged and converted into an armed merchant cruiser

In the early war years Britain desperately needed fast convoy escorts and lacked the number of warships to fulfil this role. Several ocean liners were "taken up from trade" by the Royal Navy to act as armed merchant cruisers (AMCs), after having basic armament fitted. As these ships already had experienced crews, the merchant seamen were asked to sign a T.124 agreement to serve alongside the Royal Navy in naval uniform as members of Naval Auxiliary Personnel subject to naval discipline. Approaching 10,000 seamen, mostly reluctantly signed for a period of service up to 12 months,

One of the AMCs mainly crewed by large numbers of merchant seamen was HMS Jervis Bay, which fought a tragically unequal battle with the German cruiser Admiral Scheer in defence of Convoy HX 84. Jervis Bay was lost but had bought sufficient time for the convoy to escape annihilation.

== Engagement aboard ship ==
Traditionally merchant seamen were administered from a Mercantile Marine Office; the local port office of the Registrar General of Shipping and Seamen. Such offices existed in major Ports such as Glasgow, Leith, Newcastle/South Shields, London, Southampton, Cardiff and Liverpool. The "MMO" was managed by a Mercantile Superintendent of the Civil Service and his team of clerks and messengers.

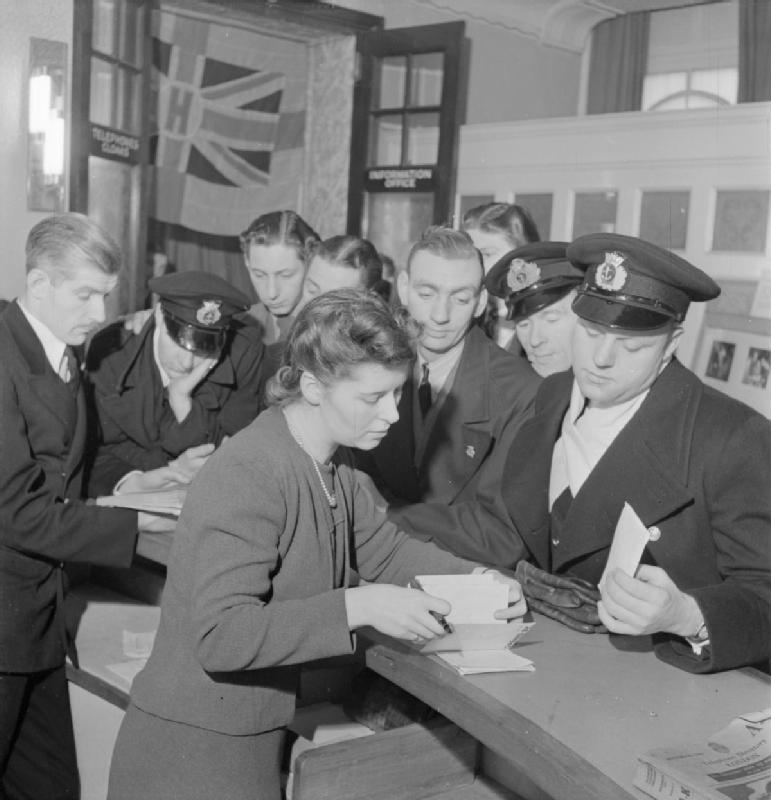
Mates and Engineers in the Merchant Navy Club in Piccadilly, 1942

In the Shipping Federation the Chief Mates and Engineers of ships seeking crews would call to have the names and destinations of their ships chalked on large, wall-mounted blackboards along with their requirement for men. Available seamen seeking engagement would be appraised, their paperwork examined and they might be engaged if they were considered to be efficient and not a known trouble maker. A seaman would then "sign on" by signing the ship's Articles of Agreement, his name appeared on the list of crew for the ship, on each row across the large page, it recorded the man's name, his rating for that engagement, his rate of pay, the name of his previous ship, his home address and his signature at the end of the row.

After the foundation of the Ministry of War Transport and the introduction of the Merchant Navy Reserve Pool continuity of employment was ensured and this served as a clearing house for available labour. On leaving a ship, a seaman was told how much leave he was entitled to take and on what date and at which port he had to report ready to return to sea. Some 40 per cent of seamen were accepted by companies for "continuous employment" and their time at sea and time on leave were administered by their company. The remaining 60 per cent were governed by the "Pool" and retained the right to reject a ship if it did not suit them, and to reject a second ship if that also did not suit them before having no option but to take the third offer. Pools were also set up in Montreal, Canada and New York City, USA for seamen resident abroad.

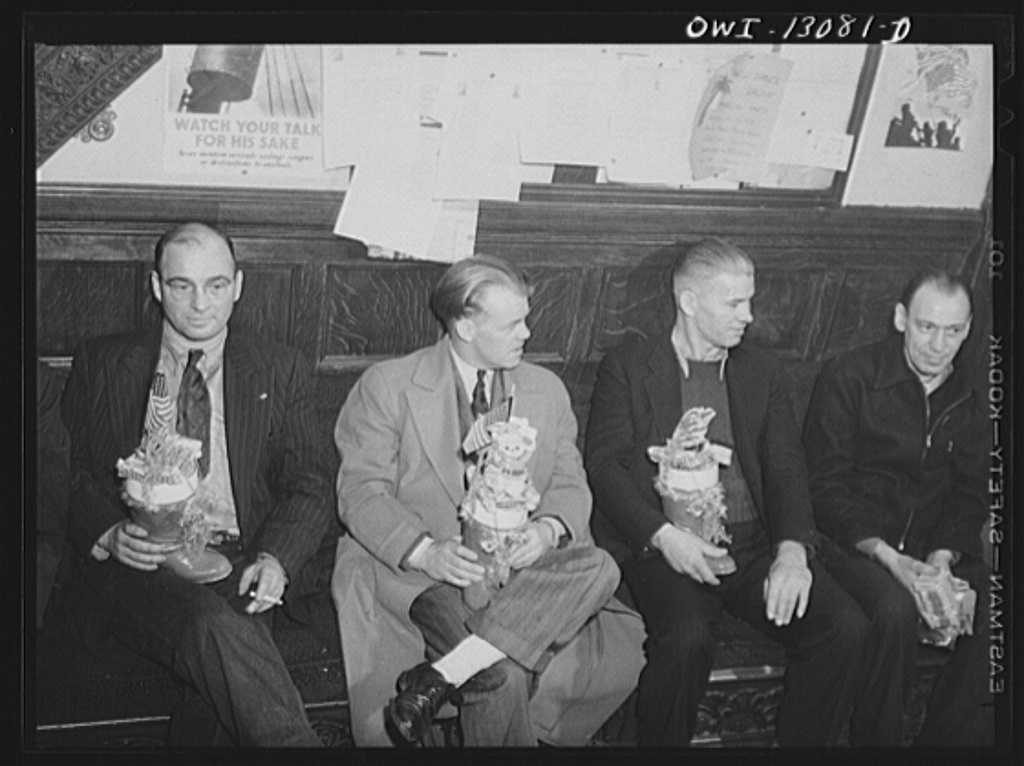
Merchant seamen in a Seamen's Club in New York, 1942

== A ship's crew ==
The crew of a ship varied in direct relation to its size and handling requirements and the role of the vessel. The largest ocean liners serving as troopships during World War II could have a crew of up to 700 men and women to cater for the thousands of soldiers being carried aboard. It would also have electricians, an on-board hospital, a laundry, masters-at-arms to maintain order, a barber's shop and so on. A refrigerated cargo liner, such as a diesel motor vessel trading between South America and England carrying a relatively small number of passengers, but also a refrigerated cargo such as meat, would additionally require a "Ship's Surgeon" and "Refrigeration Engineers" and could have a crew of 60 to 160.

The majority of the British Merchant Navy comprised coal burning general cargo steamers trading deep sea (across the globe) and had a crew of 40 to 50. A diesel-engined motor tanker averaged a crew of 44 and a small coastal collier might only have a crew of a dozen.
Ship's crews were highly compartmentalized and the different departments had little to do with each other and would not normally mix. They lived in different parts of the ship and ate apart. The only inter-departmental mixing was in the "Saloon" where the master, the mates, the chief engineer and the radio officers would eat and socialize. The engineer officers who numbered three or more ate in their own messroom. The carpenter and boatswain, who held Warrant Officer status, ate separately. The deck crew ate together and the engine-room crew ate by themselves.

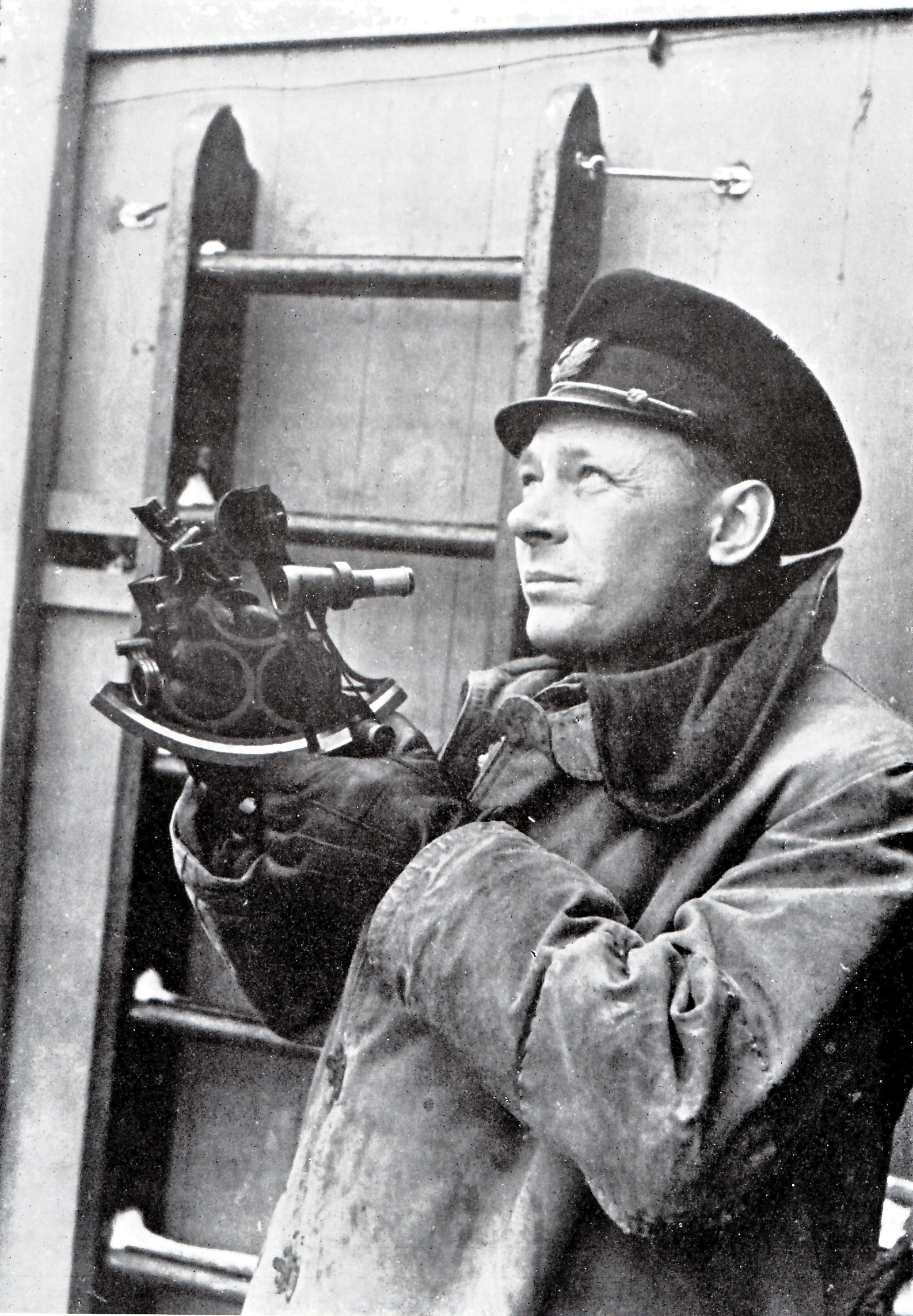
A ship's master with his sextant

The average age of a seaman aboard a British registered vessel in 1938 was about 36 years, and by 1945 it was down to about 32 years old. During the war, many ships were armed with old artillery pieces and small arms; later, 20 mm cannon. These weapons were variously manned by trained merchant seamen of the crew, or pensioned-off gunlayers of the Royal Navy or Royal Marines who had signed on as members of the crew and later by members of the Royal Artillery Maritime Regiment. These vessels were known as DEMS (defensively equipped merchant ships). Gunners varied in number with the armament and could be as few as one or two or as many as 30 men.

=== Ship's master ===
The master of a ship, locally referred to as the captain, held a Master Mariners certificate, also known as an Ordinary Certificate in Steam and some even held an Extra Master's certificate, which signified additional qualification in navigation. He was employed by the shipping company who owned the ship and was responsible to the company for every aspect of the ship, the profitable trading of the ship, the cargo, the crew and the success or failure of the voyage. Masters with a proven track record often remained with a company for many years and could expect to become wealthy. As new ships were added to a company's fleet a successful and favoured master could expect it to be assigned as "his". It was normal for a master to take his wife to sea with him if they decided that the voyage included ports which she wished to visit. At sea his word was absolute law and would be enforced by the first mate, boatswain (bosun) and boatswain's mates.

== Departments ==
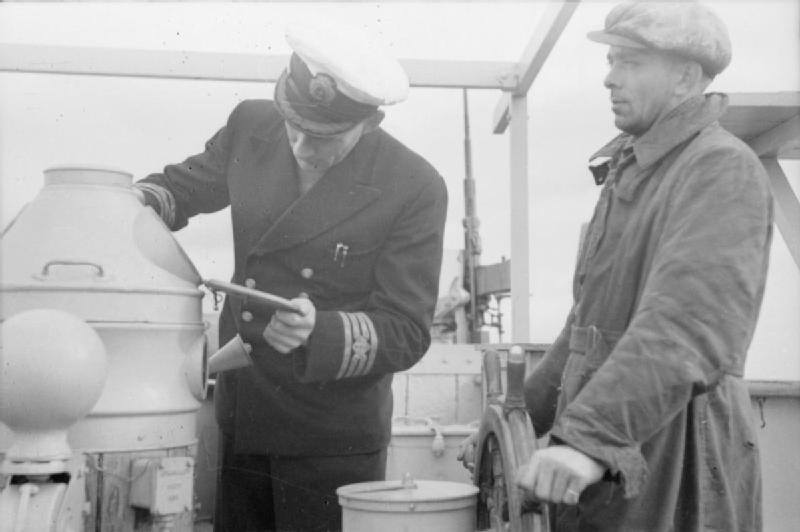
The master stands beside a quarter master at the wheel

The crew of any ship was arranged by a department system. Under the first mate, the Deck Department handled the ship and its cargo, under the first engineer; the Engineroom Department provided the power and managed the engines and the chief steward managed the catering, the provisions and ran the ship's cook and his assistants and stewards. In wartime every ocean going ship had a "radio officer" and sometimes he had assistants; but in wartime the need to maintain a constant radio watch necessitated three radio officers instead of one.

=== Deck Department ===
The first mate (also called a chief officer on ocean liners) had considerable experience at sea, usually held a Master Mariner's certificate and was gaining experience to allow him to seek employment as a master. He was responsible to the master for the cargo, ensuring everything was properly stowed and discharged at the correct port. He supervised the more junior mates in the navigation, handling and running of the ship.

The second mate (second officer) reporting to the first mate usually held a First Mate certificate and sometimes also a Master Mariner's certificate.

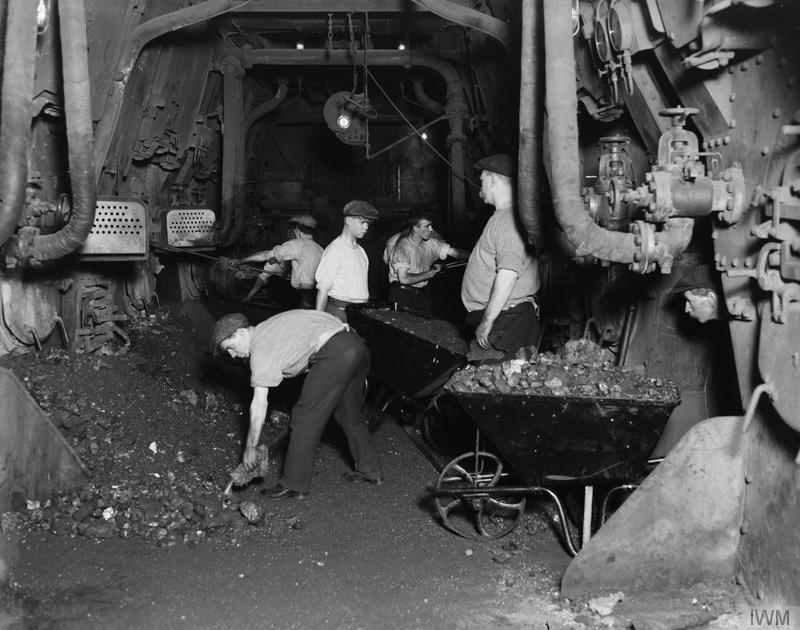
The "black gang" at work in the stokehold

The third mate reported to the more senior mates and would usually hold a Second Mate's certificate and be studying for his first mate's ticket.

Depending upon the size of the vessel it might have a fourth mate, fifth mate, and so on. The largest ocean liners could have senior and junior levels of each rate of mate as far as 10th mate.

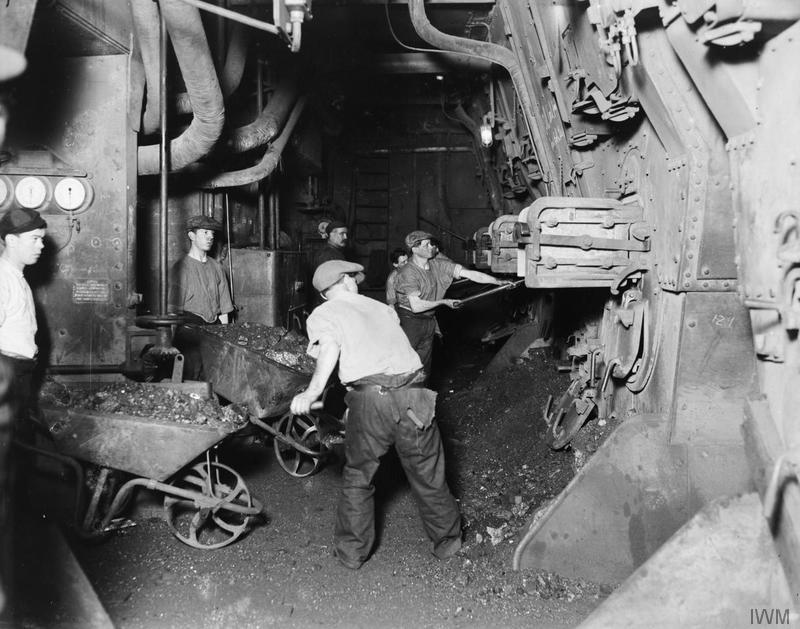
Trimmers deliver coal to firemen in the stokehold

The ship's carpenter and boatswain (bosun) were the senior deck ratings and both were typically men of very considerable sea-going experience and personality. The boatswain's mates were also experienced seamen trusted by the boatswain and mates to be able to keep the deck crew in hand either by force of personality or by using his fists. Able Seamen were the ship's seamen with sea-going experience, the highest-ranking amongst them were the "quarter masters" who stood watches on the bridge to steer the ship. the most junior were "ordinary seamen" who as yet lacked experience and the lowest were the "deck boys" who were typically fourteen- or fifteen-year-old lads learning to be seamen.

Ships often carried apprentices who were indentured to the shipping company for a period of four years to learn the trade of seaman with a view to becoming mates. Unlike midshipmen in the Royal Navy, the apprentice worked with the able Seamen, messing with them and sleeping in the seamens' accommodation. Some ship's carried a storekeeper who was an experienced older able seaman who controlled the issue of the ships stores.

=== Engineering Department ===
The Chief Engineer had to hold a First Class Certificate in Steam and would have had considerable sea-going experience, he was responsible for the main and subsidiary machinery. Reporting to him was a second engineer who would always hold a First Class Certificate in Steam and would be gaining the experience required to permit him to seek a chief's post.

There were third engineers, fourth engineers and so on, the number of them depending on the size of the vessel. All would usually have completed an apprenticeship ashore in heavy engineering, often in power stations or similar and after going to sea would have gained a Second Class Certificate in Steam. Ocean liners might have senior and junior rates such as junior seventh engineer or senior ninth engineer, depending upon the number of officers carried aboard.

The senior engineroom ratings were the donkeyman and the greaser (petty officers), in addition to heading the "black gang", (engine room ratings), the former was responsible for the ship's auxiliary power and for maintenance of cargo handling derricks, the latter ensured correct lubrication of all necessary parts of the engines and keeping the Firemen and Trimmers in order.

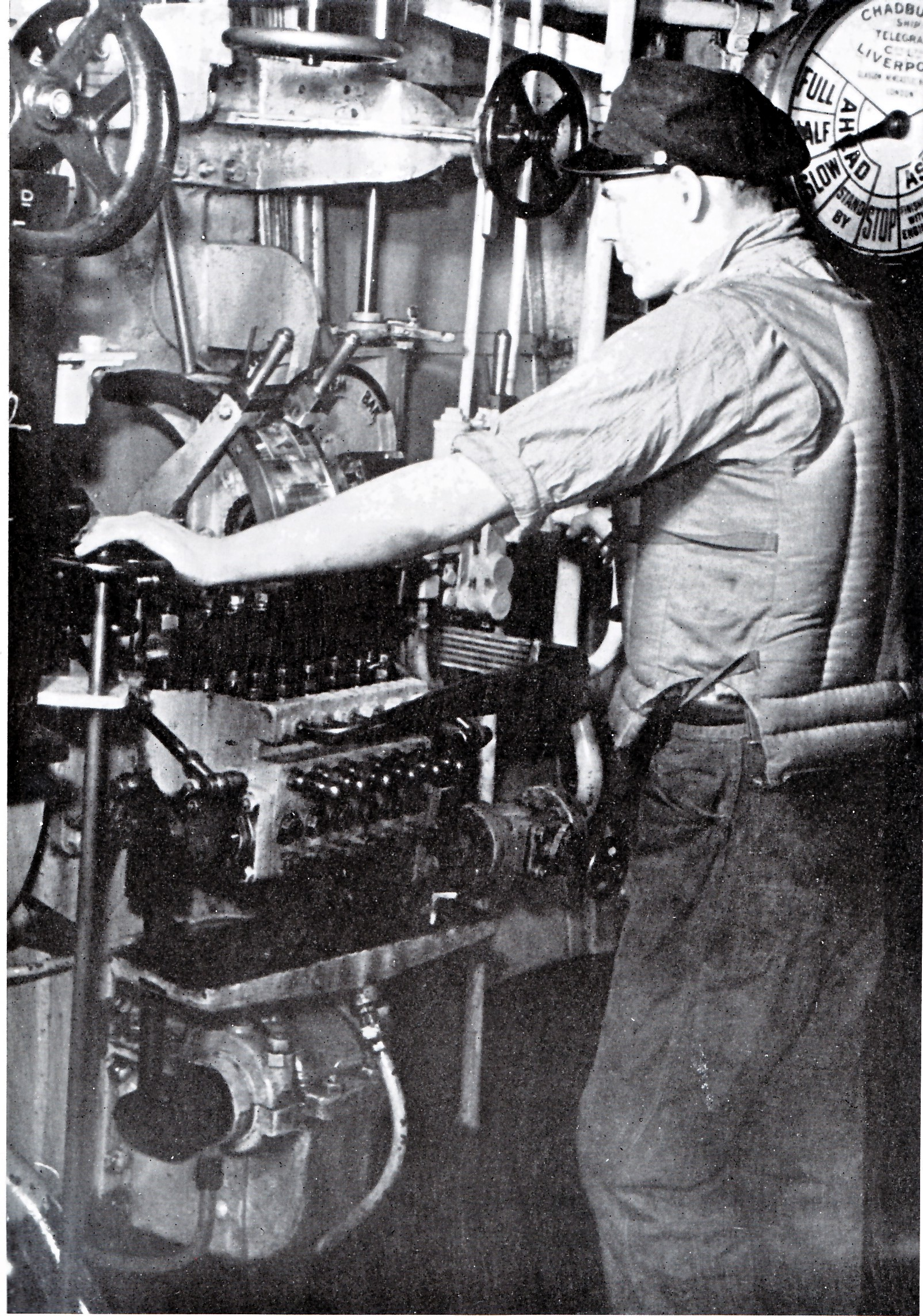
An engineer officer at work

The Black gang, were the men who handled the coal and spent their working lives coated in coal dust as most ships were coal burning steamers. They were normally divided into two groups, the Firemen and the Trimmers. The Firemen were the men who stood watches in the stokehold feeding tons of coal into the furnaces beneath the boilers to keep up a head of steam. The Trimmers were the men who spent their lives in the ship's bunkers (the hold which held the coal) and were responsible for loading barrows of coal with which they ran across planks of wood to the stokehold to maintain the piles of coal beside the men feeding the furnaces. They had to keep the level of coal within the bunkers trimmed (level) to prevent the ship becoming unstable.

Some ships carried Engineroom Storekeepers, experienced older ratings who controlled the issues of stores.

=== Catering department ===
The larger the ship, the larger the catering department. Aboard a general cargo ship all matters of victualling/catering from food, cleaning of officer's cabins and supplies of food and drink were managed by a Chief Steward. He would usually have two or three Assistant Stewards reporting to him. Also reporting to him was a Chief Cook (senior Petty Officer status), with his Assistants and a Galley Boy, one of his assistants was usually a baker. On a long voyage, food became the centre of attention for the crew and a cook unable to produce food which was considered acceptable would very quickly become seriously unpopular.

== Working hours and pay ==
The pay of merchant seamen was poor when compared to the pay received by a factory worker or building site worker ashore. A primary factor was the long working hours of the merchant seaman who had a basic working week of 64 hours before overtime compared with the working week of 44 hours in the building industry then or 47 hours in the engineering industry. In 1943 the seaman's basic working week was reduced to 56 hours.

Considerable resentment was felt by seamen after learning that seamen of the U.S. Merchant Marine earned more than double their wages.

== Living conditions and food ==
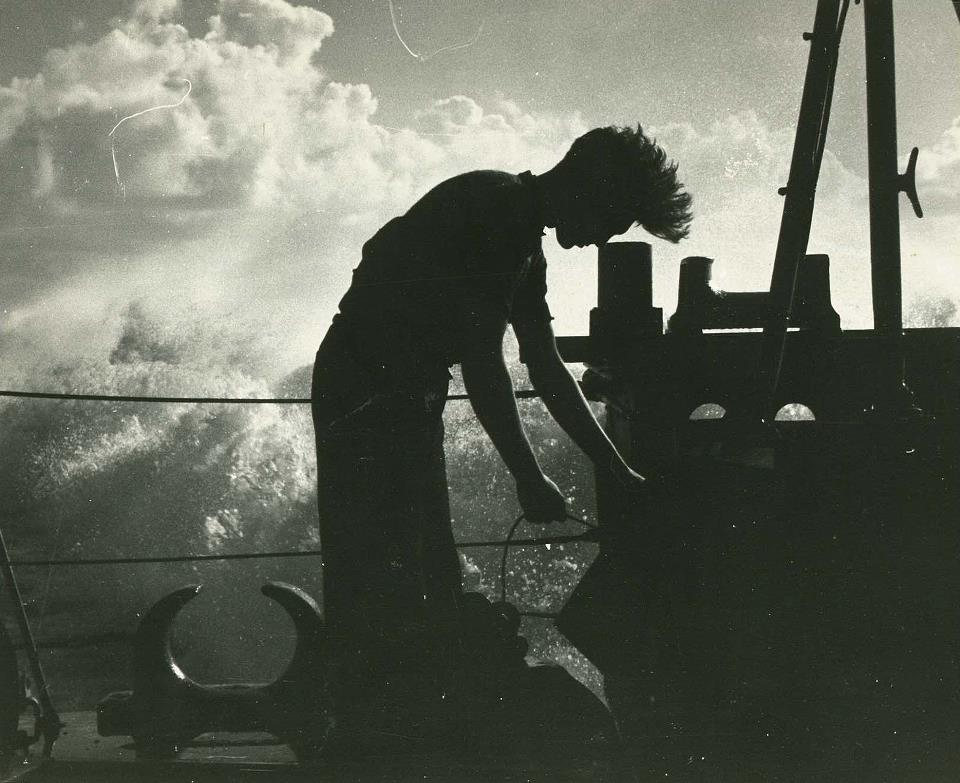
Deck Boy at work on a ship in a convoy bound for Russia in 1943

Food were usually coarse and poor as refrigeration was not usually available aboard ship for crew provisions. Any frozen food available was from an ice-box and after the ice melted salt meat from brine tubs and butter from tins provided much of the staple diet. Fresh eggs, fruit and vegetables might or might not be provided on arrival in port dependent on the budget held by the Chief Steward which was spent only with the permission of the Master who was there to ensure the success and profit of each voyage. Seamen lived in dark, confined, damp, poorly ventilated and often rusty dormitory accommodation with wooden board bunks three or more high, without running water and lacking heating. Each man might be provided one or two blankets at best and was expected to bring his own "donkey's breakfast" – a sack cloth bag containing straw which was to serve as a mattress. In the pre-war years, seamen competed to sign on aboard vessels owned by shipping lines which were known as "good feeders" due to their staple diets being superior while others would be avoided for providing poor food. One, (Hogarth & Sons of Glasgow), being commonly referred to as "Hungry Hogarth's" by seamen.

== Progression ==
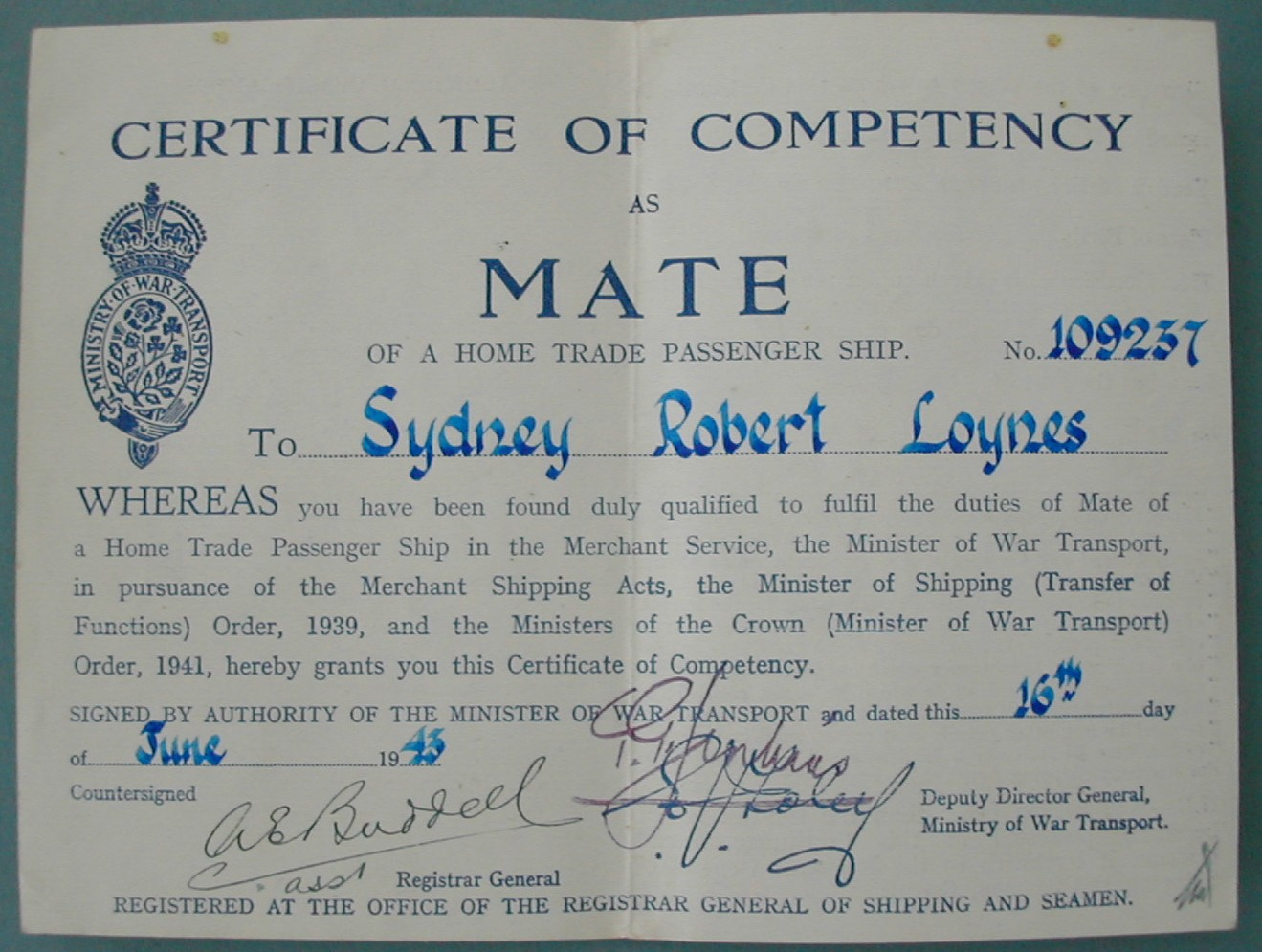
Merchant Navy 2nd Mate Certificate, 1943

Based on their own experience, abilities and hard work, any Able Seaman was eligible to progress from the most junior rating to firstly take the examination for a Second Mate's certificate, then after sufficient sea-time, a First Mate and finally Master Mariner and it was not unusual for a former Deck Boy to become a master. In order to obtain a Second Mate's certificate (known as a "ticket"), a seaman would have had to have gained several years sea-time experience either as an Apprentice (a Cadet) or as an Able Seaman, no matter what his background or educational qualifications, either route involved living and working with seamen. There was very little class consciousness at sea, particularly aboard general cargo ("tramp") steamers although the degree of regimentation necessary for maintenance of discipline amongst large crews and the adoption of naval-like uniforms aboard ocean liners did sometimes attract officers and others who were more comfortable in that environment.

== Company men ==
Frequently certificated officers, both deck and engineering, built careers within specific shipping companies and only sailed aboard ships owned by that company. They were often able to progress on the basis of being requested by a master who had just gained his own command. Sometimes senior ratings such as Carpenters, Boatswains, Quarter Masters, Donkeymen and particularly Chief Stewards also preferred this career path and like their officers could even remain aboard a favoured ship for a decade or more.

== Paperwork ==
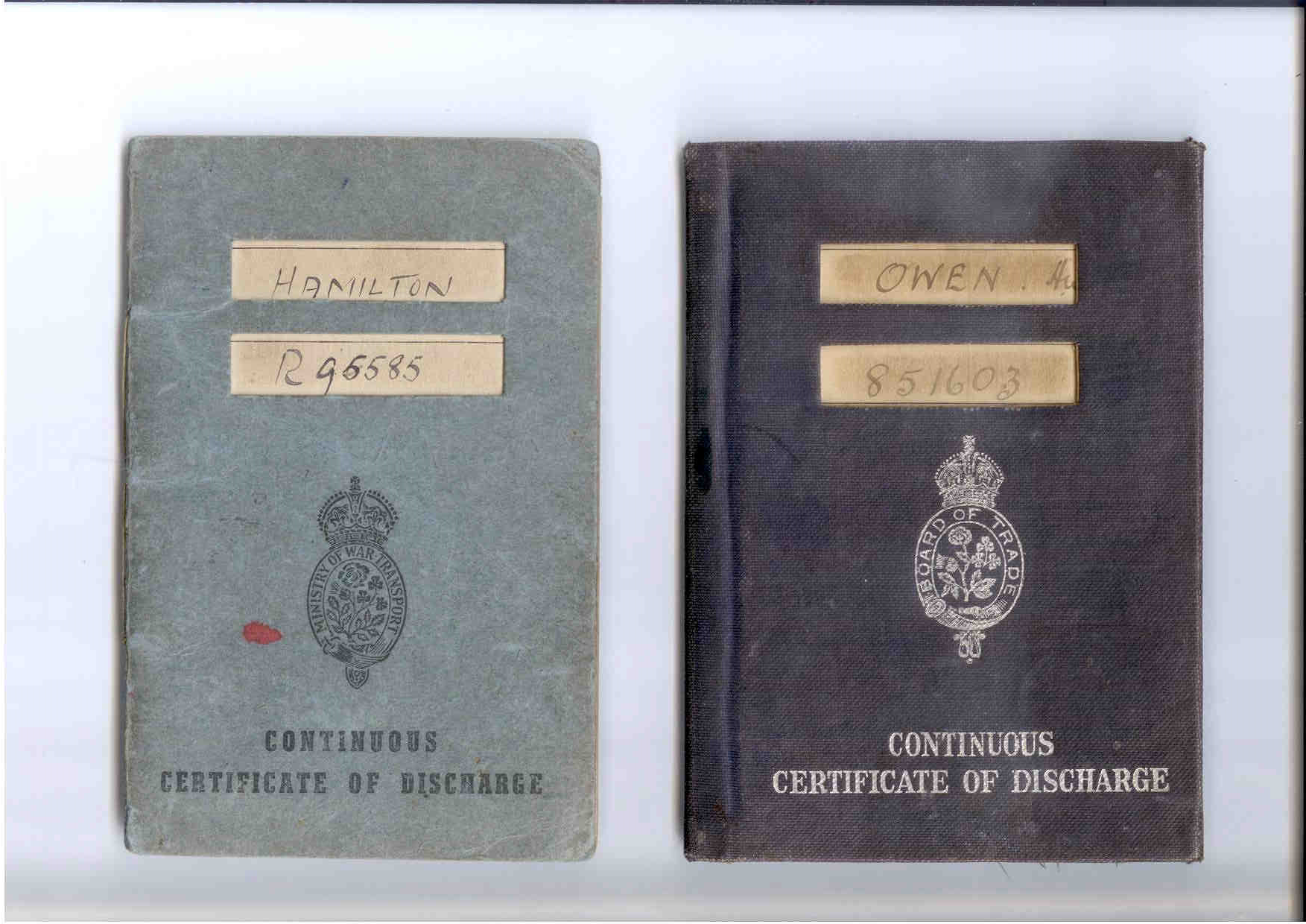
Light blue wartime economy issue Merchant Navy Seaman's Discharge Book beside a dark blue covered pre-war issue type

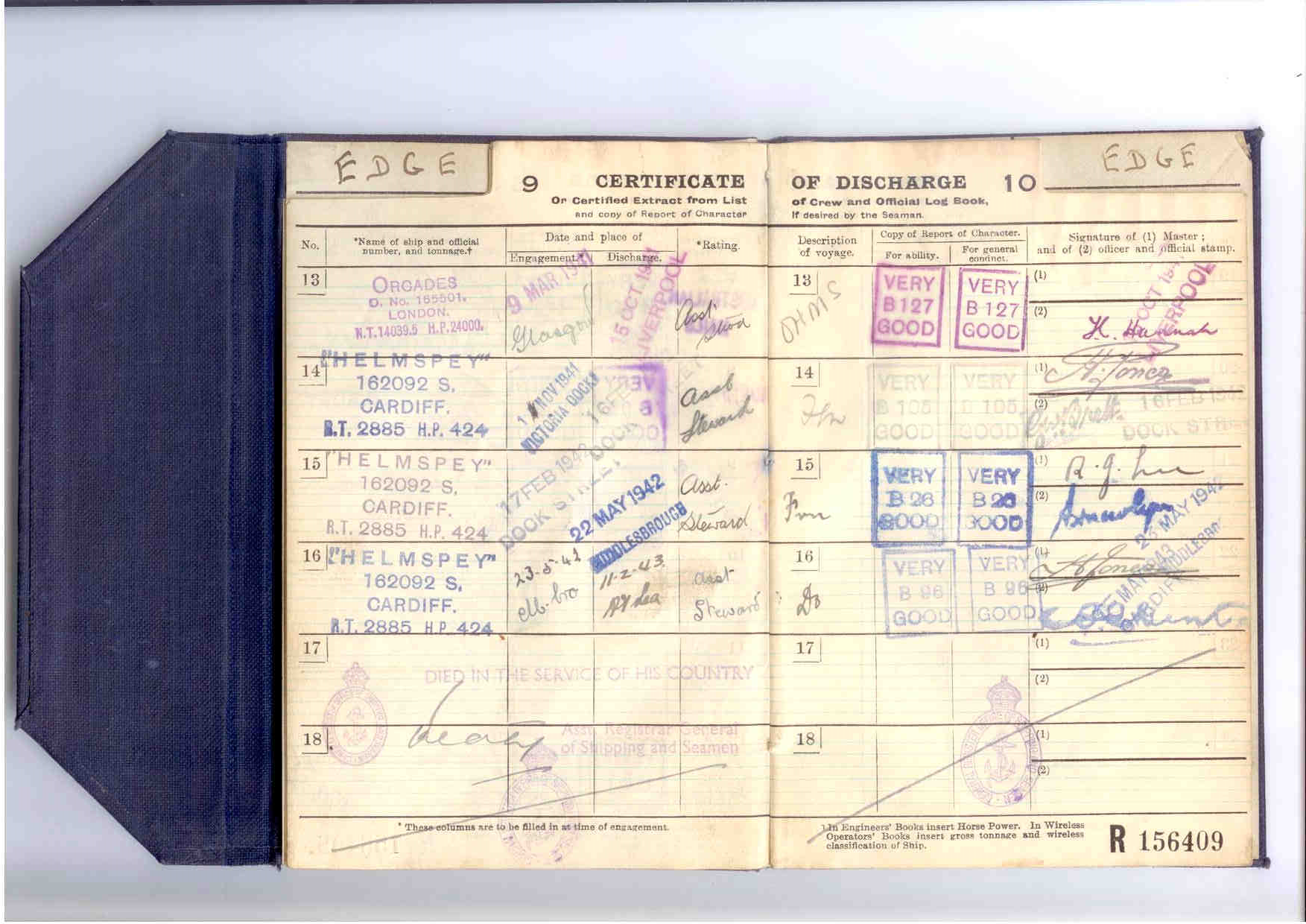
Merchant Navy Seaman's Discharge Book showing his service aboard several vessels until he died of injuries received in the sinking of his last ship

When a seaman paid off at the end of their engagement they would receive in addition to their pay, a detailed payslip showing hours worked at basic and overtime rates and monies paid in subs during the voyage or while in port. There was a Discharge Slip which specified the name of the ship on which they had served, the rating in which they sailed (e-g-., Able Seaman or Fireman) and the dates of their service aboard. It also gave indication of their ability at work and their conduct during that period.

If the seaman held a Discharge Book (a Continuous Certificate of Discharge) which was effectively an ongoing record of their career at sea, the same details would be entered into that book. Seamen hoped to receive a VG/VG rating which indicated "very good" in both capacities because sometimes lower rates such as G-Good or Sat-Satisfactory would be given or even a D-Declined and lower ratings, might affect their prospects when next seeking work aboard a choice vessel sailing a choice route.

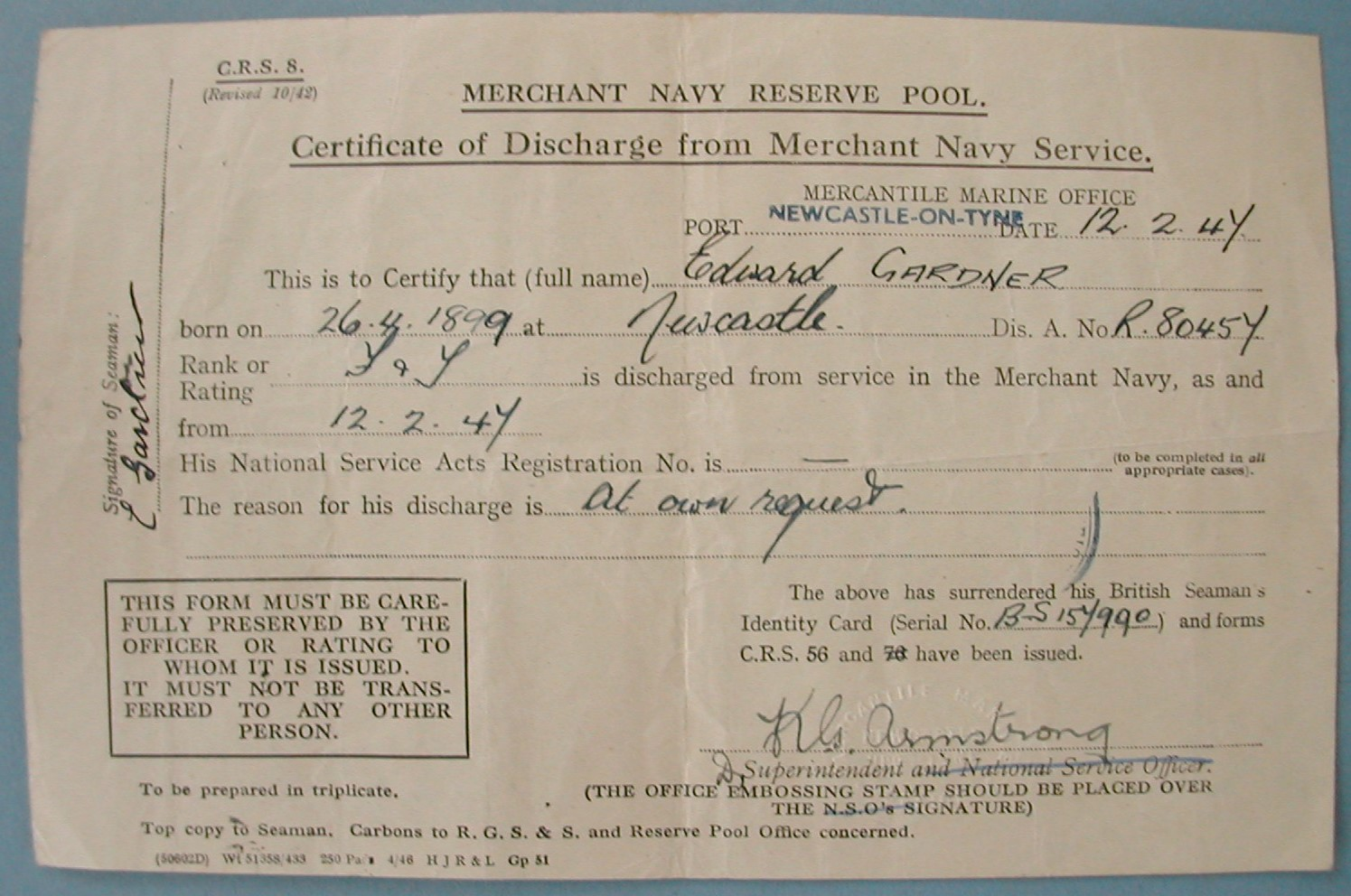
Final Discharge from the Merchant Navy after war service

A seaman taking his final discharge from the Merchant Navy at the end of the war was not released until approval could be gained unless it was a discharge due to him being unfit to sail any longer. A large number of seamen continued to sail as it was their usual occupation.

== Nationalities of seamen ==
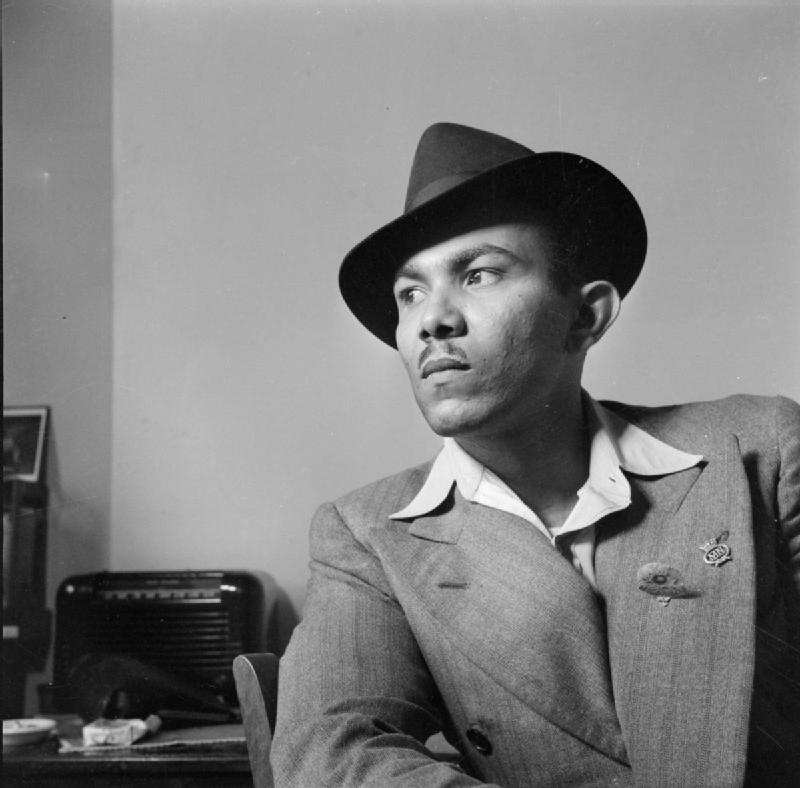
A merchant seaman from Aden in 1943. Note MN lapel badge

The majority of seamen manning ships of the British Merchant Navy were British. However, in a 1938 survey, it was found that 27 per cent were either from India or China and another 5 per cent were British domiciled Arabs, Indians, Chinese, West Africans or West Indians mainly resident in major UK ports such as Cardiff, Liverpool or South Shields.

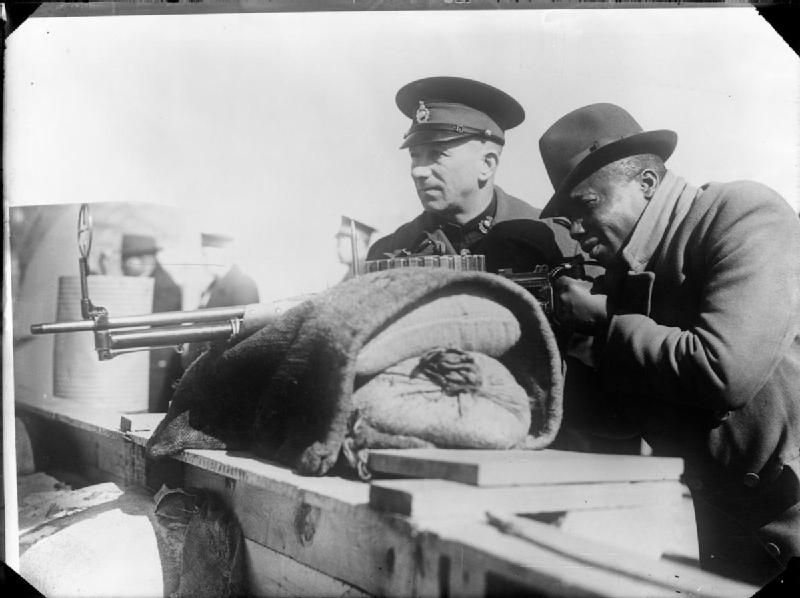
A merchant seaman learns to use a machine-gun on a gunnery course in Liverpool, April 1942

A review of a typical crew sailing aboard a typical British coal burning general cargo steamer in May 1940 revealed:- The deck officers came from northern Scotland, South Wales, Portsmouth and Liverpool. The engineer officers were from Jarrow, Hull, Liverpool and the Netherlands. The engineroom crew were mainly South Shields resident Somali Arabs. The deck crew consisted of UK resident Indians, one man was from Burma (Myanmar). There were also one from Fiji, a West Indian, a Chinese and a Liverpudlian. The chief steward was from Cardiff; the cook and two galley boys were from Liverpool. The oldest member of the crew was the 55-year-old cook and the youngest was the 15-year-old galley boy.

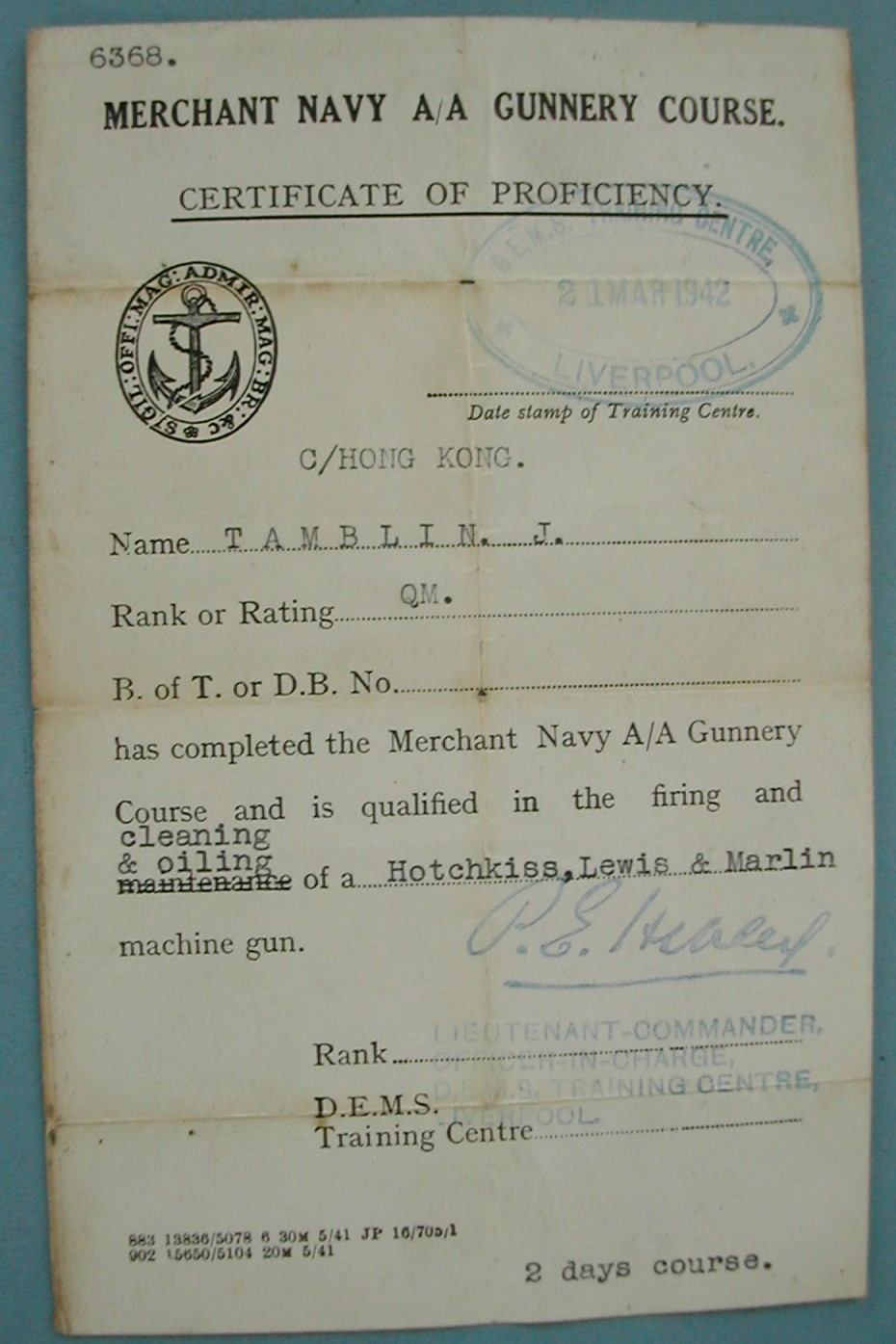
Merchant Navy gunnery certificate, Canada, 1943

Records show that men from all British Commonwealth countries and most Scandinavian, Baltic and European countries served aboard British registered vessels and until the December 1941 attack on Pearl Harbor there were Japanese seamen amongst crews, several of whom were killed in U-boat attacks serving beside British colleagues, and others such as Kenji Takaki were captured and interned with British seamen at Marlag-Milag.

== Gunnery training ==
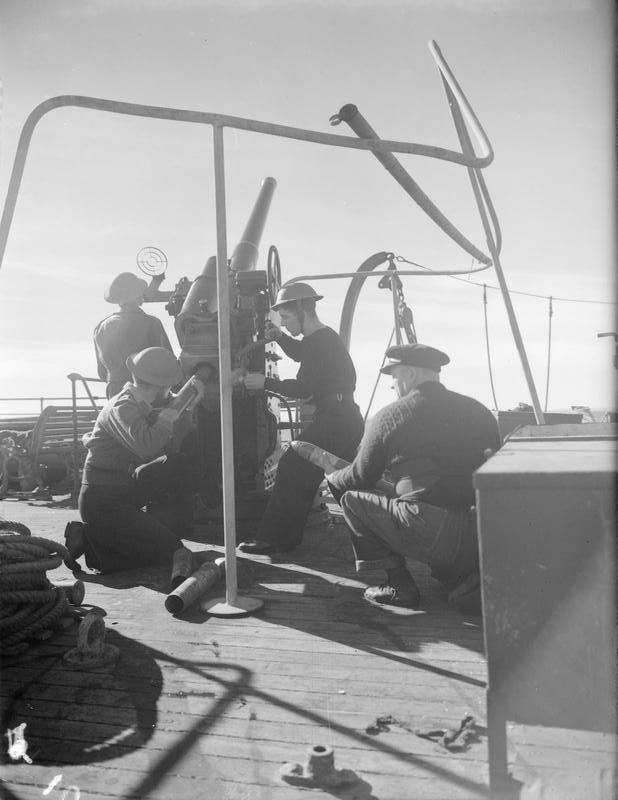
A crew practising with a 12-pounder anti-aircraft gun

Merchant ships were quickly fitted with defensive armament and their crews trained to use the World War I surplus 12-pounder, Hotchkiss or Lewis machine guns and even .303 Lee Enfield rifles. Gunnery courses were held regularly in the major ports such as Liverpool, Bristol and Newcastle, with Naval and Royal Marine instructors and certificates awarded to those seamen who completed them and so were able to return fire if attacked.

== Under attack ==
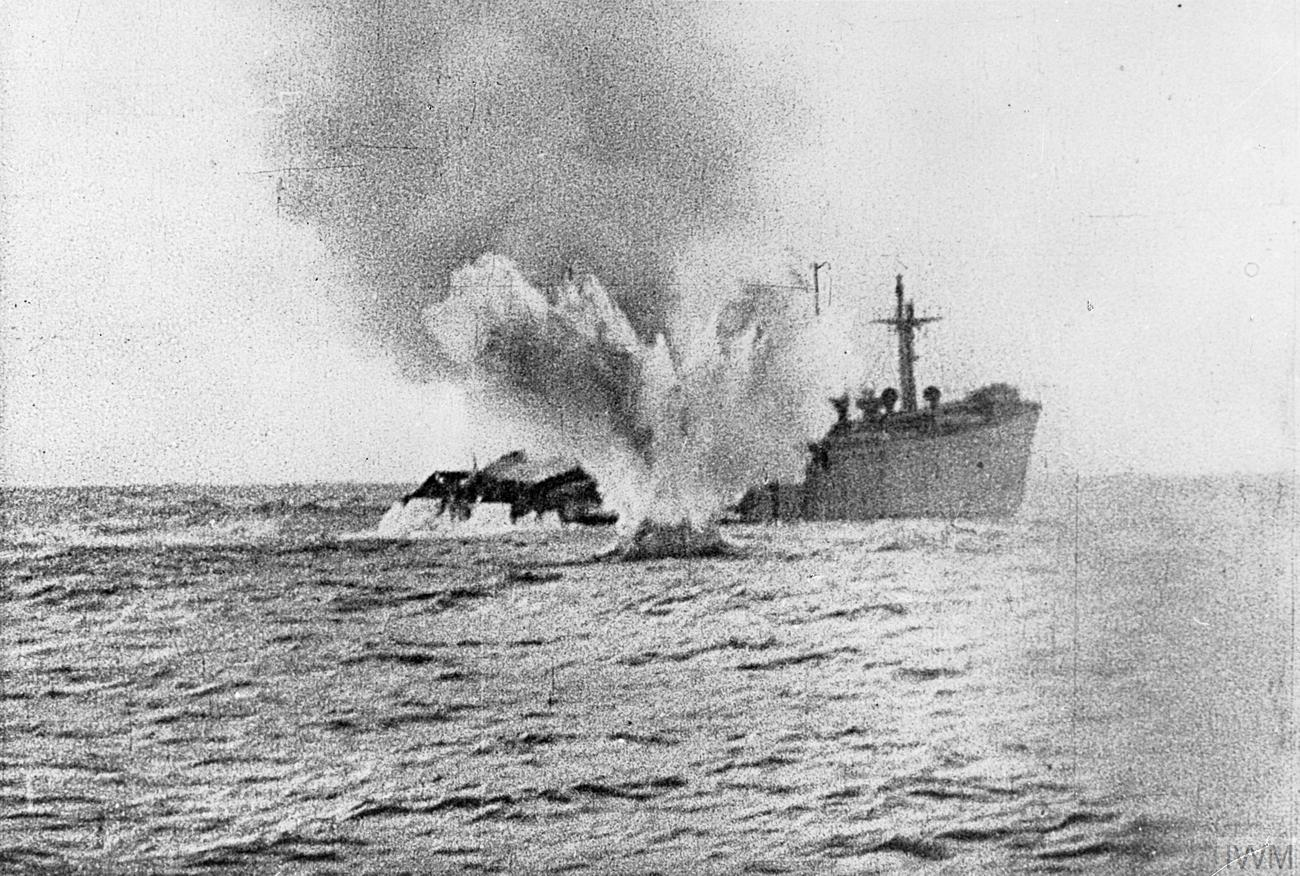
A torpedoed merchant ship sinking

Merchant seamen were dying within nine hours of the outbreak of war on 3 September 1939 when U-30 torpedoed the passenger carrying ocean liner SS Athenia and then surfaced to attack the sinking ship with gunfire, destroying her radio room, she sank with the loss of 118 lives (including women and children). Amongst the dead were 19 of her crew, including 5 females, stewardesses and a 15-year-old Bell Boy, and a 65-year-old Watchman. They continued to serve in every corner of the world throughout the war, some returning to sea even after having ships sunk beneath them on multiple occasions. The author John Slader survived three sinkings and was not unusual amongst seamen.

=== Killed or missing ===
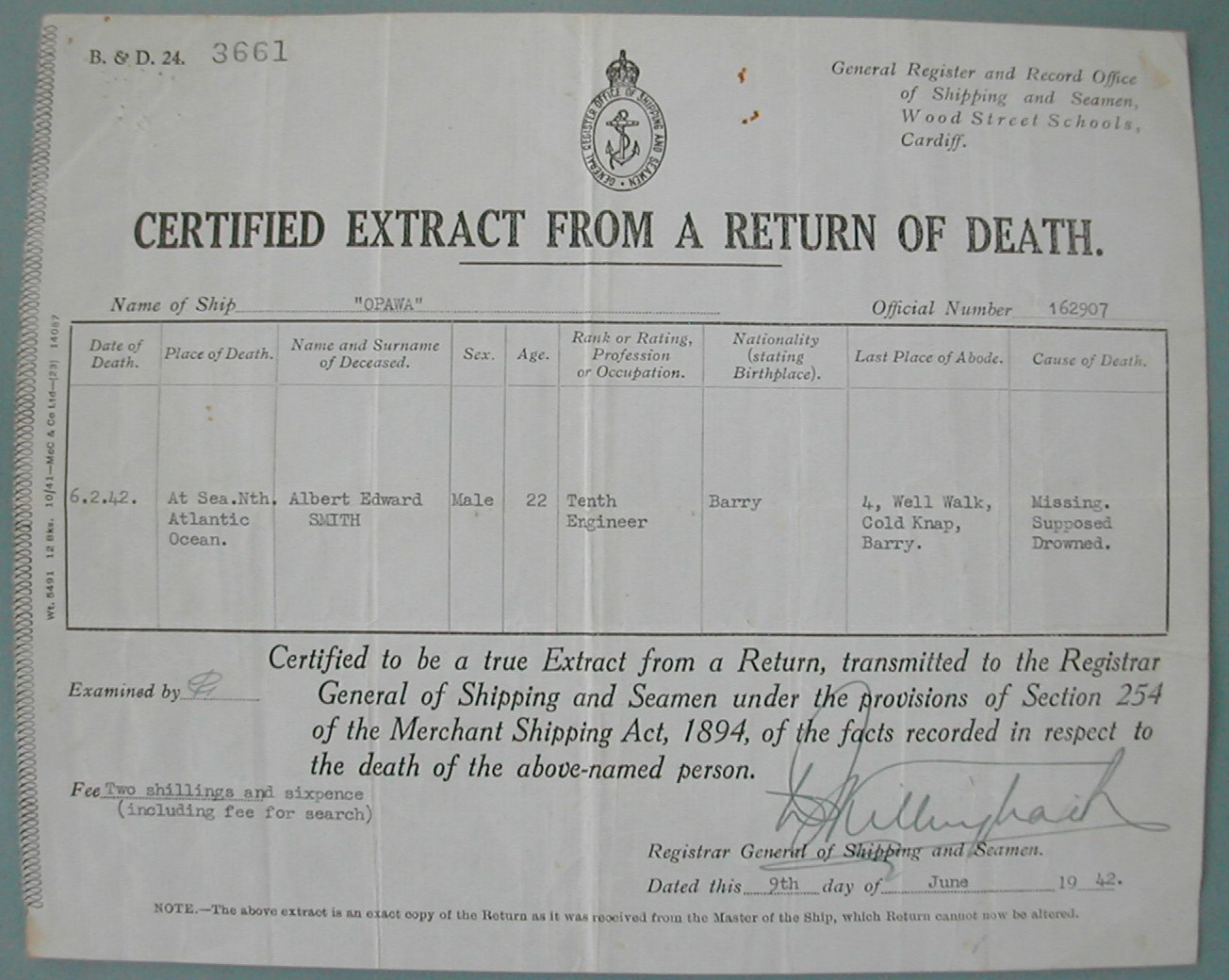
Certificate of Death – Merchant Navy – 1942

Once torpedoed, merchant ships behaved very differently, a tanker carrying high octane aviation fuel might explode into flame, spreading a film of burning fuel across the sea all around the ship as it sank, a ship loaded with timber might

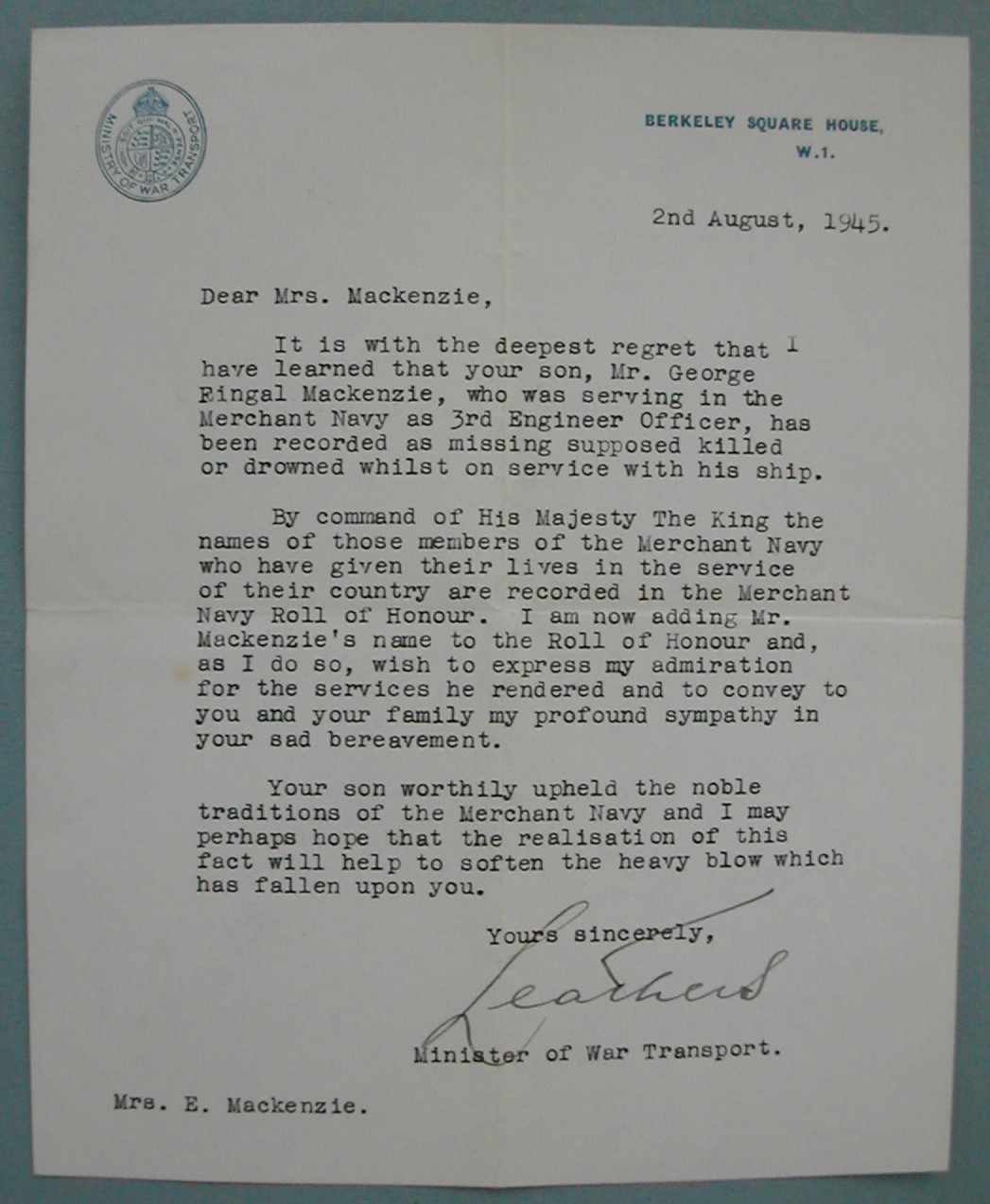
Condolence Letter to the mother of a MN seaman

remain afloat for several days, a ship with a cargo of bulk iron ore would usually sink in less than 60 seconds as water quickly flooded the cargo holds. Sometimes there might be time to launch the ship's boats, but other times seamen could be struggling to survive in the water trying to hang onto any floating debris.

It is difficult to estimate the total number of merchant seamen who lost their lives during World War II because the government of the time did not grant them the automatic right of commemoration by the Commonwealth War Graves Commission. Unlike the Armed Services in which every wartime death by whatever means was recorded and commemorated, the seamen of the Merchant Navy could only be remembered if their death could be proven to be attributable to enemy action. 36,749 members of the Merchant Navy and Fishing Fleet are commemorated and could be counted.

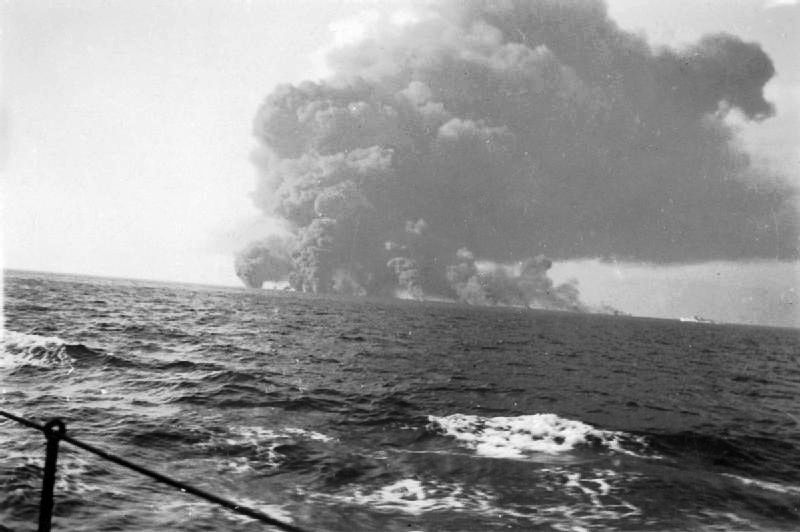
The SS Waimarama explodes after being torpedoed

In March 1946 Sir William Elderton (statistical advisor to the Ministry of War Transport), reported 34,018 deaths aboard British registered vessels or ashore abroad. He divided this total into 27,790 who died by enemy action and 6,228 who died by other causes (including those aboard ships which disappeared or died as the result of ships being sunk by friendly sea mines or being lost overboard in storms). He advised adjustments to his war deaths figure to 28,230, but did not account for an estimated 4,537 men missing aboard small vessels in the Far East. Up to the end of 1945, the Ministry of Pensions knew of 1,078 merchant seamen who had died ashore "at home" from wounds, the effects of exposure while awaiting rescue in open boats and so on. In reply to a question in the House of Commons the then Prime Minister, Clement Attlee, cited 30,189 deaths by enemy action and it was acknowledged that 5,264 seamen were still listed as missing, this was to update a previously quoted total of 30,248 killed and 4,654 missing. Writing in 1968, Vice-Admiral Schofield quoted an estimate of 32,952 deaths of British merchant seamen from enemy action, and Gabe Thomas, former Registrar General of Shipping and Seamen, in his own book stated the casualty total was 32,076 dead by enemy action, he stated that was a 27 per cent casualty rate. A count of the Merchant Navy casualties who are commemorated by the "CWGC", gives the figures below and a total of 36,749 dead.

MN	Nation	Deaths
British Merchant Navy	(United Kingdom) GBR	26,543
Indian Merchant Navy	(India) IND	6,114
MN – Naval Auxiliary Personnel	(United Kingdom) GBR	1,495
Canadian Merchant Navy	CAN	1,271
Fishing Fleet	GBR	878
Australian Merchant Navy	AUS	441

The deaths of 2,713 Naval and DEMS gunners and 1,222 gunners of the Maritime Regiment Royal Artillery are commemorated separately amongst the Armed Forces casualties. At least 182 South Africans and 72 (possibly up to 146) New Zealanders died, probably being counted within the British Merchant Navy total in the same way that the Chinese dead are. Potentially there are up to 6,228 more Merchant Seamen who died but are not commemorated.

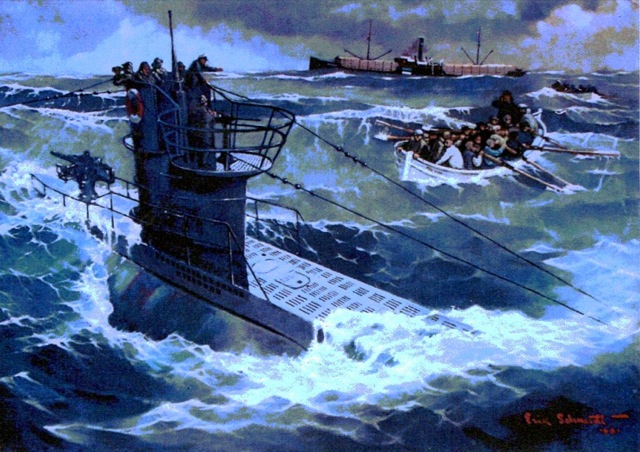
Survivors of the SS Merisaar with U-99

=== Time adrift ===
Following the sinking of a ship, merchant seamen hoped to get out of the water into lifeboats or onto life rafts (the construction of which was similar to several wooden pallets joined) and to await rescue; they lived from any supply of biscuits and fresh water which had been prepared. Large numbers of wounded or exhausted survivors did not manage this and died in the sea which could be covered in thick oil, which was sometimes burning. Survivors of ships sunk in Arctic waters did not fare as well as those in the North Atlantic. Lifeboats were often up-turned in heavy seas and had to be righted before survivors could get inside them. Some had a sail, others would merely drift with the ocean currents. Some survivors were rescued within hours, some were adrift for many weeks and some boats or rafts packed with survivors were never seen again.

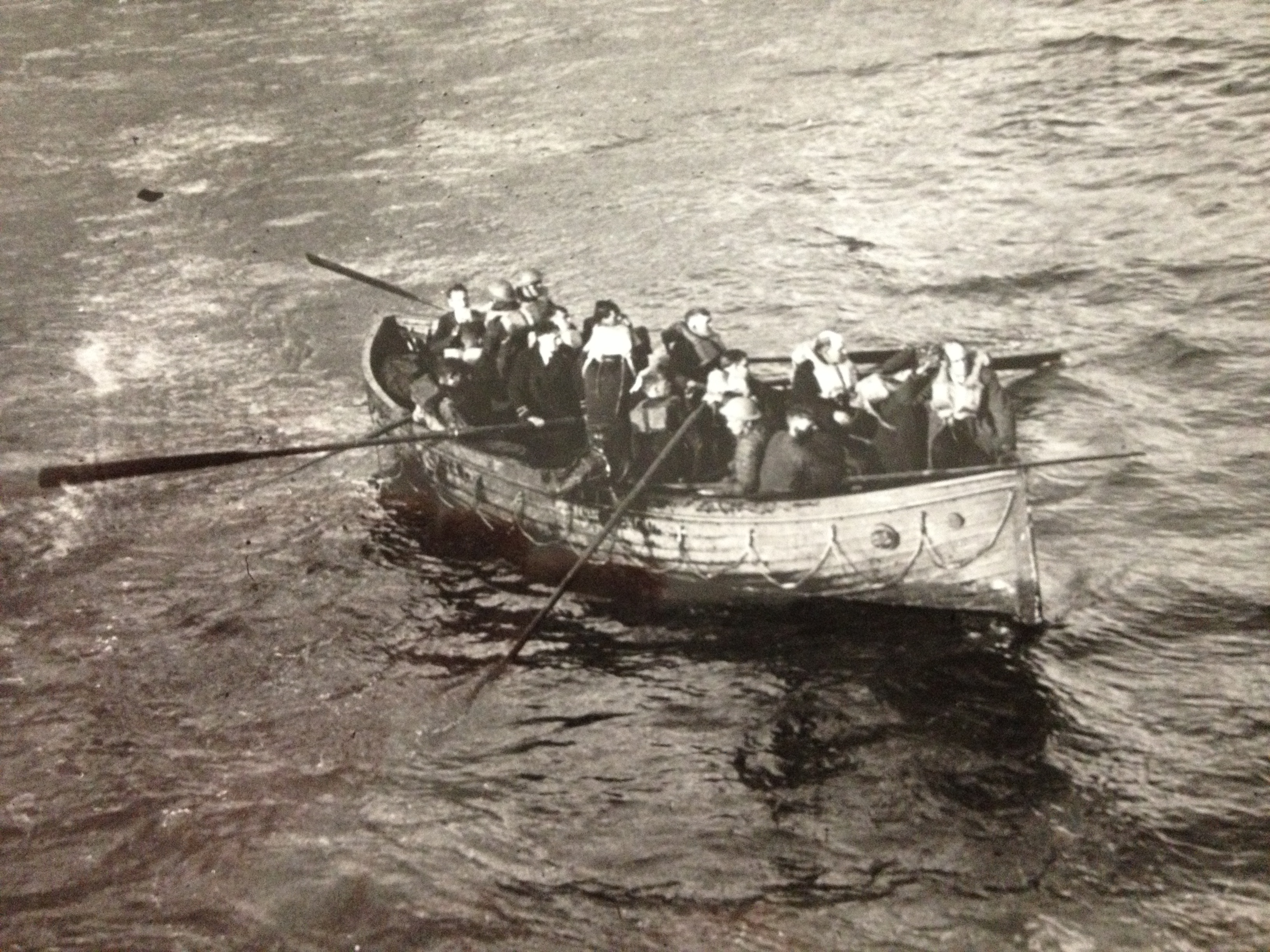
Seamen in a lifeboat about to be rescued

Some convoys were accompanied by "Rescue Ships" which literally steamed with the convoy to stop and rescue surviving merchant seamen from the water.

Lifeboats not rescued might make voyages of considerable distances. One lifeboat from SS Britannia sailed 1,500 miles to make land. During 23 days adrift 44 of the survivors died from wounds and exposure to the weather. Two merchant seamen survivors of SS Anglo Saxon survived for 70 days in an open boat before rescue, and merchant seaman Poon Lim, sole survivor of the SS. Benlomond was rescued after 133 days adrift, the record however was 135 days, by two torpedoed Indian seamen, Mohamed Aftab and Thakur Miah of the SS. Fort Longueuil. German U-boats and Italian submarines which sank the ships, frequently surfaced to provide assistance to survivors. The submariners would right up-turned life boats, provide food and drink and often give the best course to steer to land. Some U-boat commanders, such as Wilhelm Schulz of U-124 and Karl-Friedrich Merten of U-68, were recognized for several humanitarian acts.

Assistance to survivors reduced dramatically after the bombing attack by a USN B-24 maritime patrol aircraft on U-156 (under Werner Hartenstein) which had broadcast on open radio frequencies for assistance and was flying Red Cross flags after rescuing survivors of the liner Laconia and towing a chain of lifeboats towards land aided by U-506 and U-507. See the Laconia Incident.

=== Prisoners of War and Escapers ===
Very few merchant seamen were taken prisoner aboard German or Italian submarines due to the limited space available. Occasionally the ship's master or an officer might be taken aboard and would be sent to a prisoner of war camp when the U-boat returned to its base on the coast of occupied France or Norway. Several captured merchant seamen were killed as prisoners of war aboard U-boats, when they were sunk by Allied anti-submarine escorts. Captain F H Fenn of the SS. Yorkwood, and Captain D. MacCallum of the SS. Baron Dechmont, were both lost aboard U-507 when it was sunk and Captain G H Moss of the SS. St Usk, was lost aboard U-161 when she was sunk.

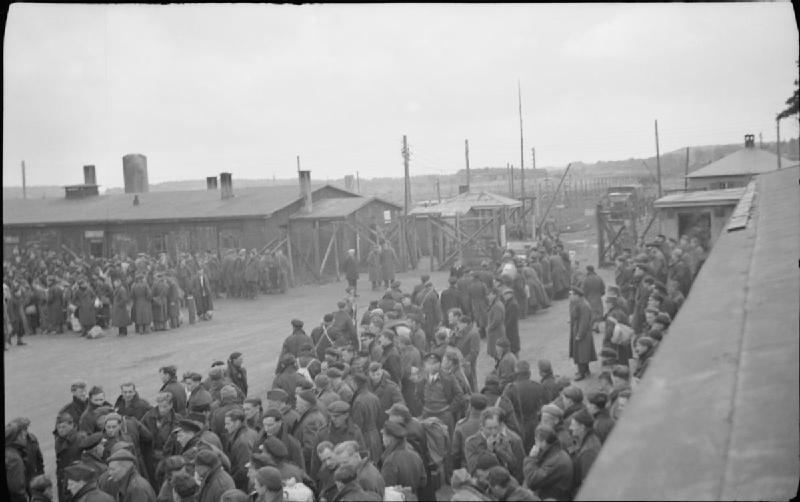
The liberation of Merchant Navy prisoners at Milag

Most of the merchant seamen taken prisoner were seized by German "Raiders"- heavily armed merchant ships disguised as neutral or friendly vessels which would capture Allied merchant vessels and seize their cargo for the Axis powers. Vessels might be converted to prison ships to accommodate the merchant seamen captured aboard the seized vessels or they might be sailed by a German prize crew to a home port.

Following the capture by German raiders of the ships Antonis, British Union, Africa Star, Eurylochus, Duquesa, Stanpark, Zamzam, Barneveld and Canadian Cruiser; their crews numbering 327 merchant seamen and several Royal Navy seamen. They were held prisoner aboard the SS. Portland to be transported back to Germany. Led by Able Seaman Alfred Fry, a merchant seaman, an attempt was made to set the ship on fire and take her over. It was defeated in a gun battle and the Germans retained control. The merchant seamen involved were charged with "Mutiny" by German authorities, many received long prison sentences and Fry was sentenced to death, although badly beaten and with his health broken, he did survive.

The 4,900 Merchant seamen taken prisoner by the Germans were generally held at a prisoner of war camp known as MILAG (Marine Internierten Lager) inside Sandbostel Internment Camp near Bremen in Germany. Sir William Elderton, in his report for the Ministry of War Transport on 25 November 1946, recorded that 4,633 merchant seamen of Britain and the Commonwealth were captured and held prisoner in the European theatre, One prisoner of war, First Radio Officer Walter Skett, was shot and killed by a German camp guard while attempting to escape from his prison camp.

Just as with Armed Forces prisoners, merchant seamen did attempt to escape and at least one, Arthur H (Dick) Bird MBE, got home from Germany via Sweden. Others broke out from their prison camps, on journeys to or from hospitals, or from railways while being transported between camps.

In the Far East, any merchant seamen held by the Japanese in prison camps fared as poorly as the other prisoners of war, particularly those held at Penang, Java or in the Japanese homeland where deaths due to disease or starvation were not unusual.

British merchant seamen, and Fleet Air Arm pilots and navigators, RCAF, and RN personnel were held prisoner in West- and North Africa. MN crew of SS Criton, plus a token prize crew, held in Conakry, Timbuktu and Kankan. Crews of several other ships, including Tweed, Samso and Delftshaven were held in West Africa. Crews of HMS Manchester, HMS Havock, and SS Empire Pelican, Parracombe, and Empire Defender were held at El Kef, North Africa, plus other survivors from Rodney Star, Empire Guillomot, and Laconia.

=== War crimes ===
Despite wartime propaganda which fostered the concept of German U-boats surfacing to machine gun helpless survivors, building a myth, this was not correct. On the occasion of the sinking of the Greek SS Peleus (13 March 1944) by U-852 in what became known as the Peleus 'incident', three or four members of the U-boat crew did follow the order of the submarine commander (Heinz-Wilhelm Eck) to machine gun wreckage and survivors in the water. A trial took place post-war – the commander and his officers were shot. This is the only proven instance. One other instance was believed to have happened, involving U-247 after it had sunk the fishing trawler Noreen Mary. However the U-boat was sunk in action shortly afterwards and as such nothing could be proven. A substantial number of documented cases of U-boat men aiding survivors are however proven and are clearly reported in Admiralty files (Adm 199 series at the National Archives, London).

In the Far East it was not at all unusual for merchant seamen who survived ships which had been sunk by submarines of the Imperial Japanese Navy to be machine-gunned in the water, some Japanese submarines such as I-37 made a practice of this. See SS British Chivalry for the fate of the crew although even after a determined effort to kill survivors 38 seamen managed to stay alive for 37 more days in open boats until they were rescued. I-37 did the same after sinking the MV.Sutlej and SSAscot". Other examples were the fate of the crew of SS Tjisalak.

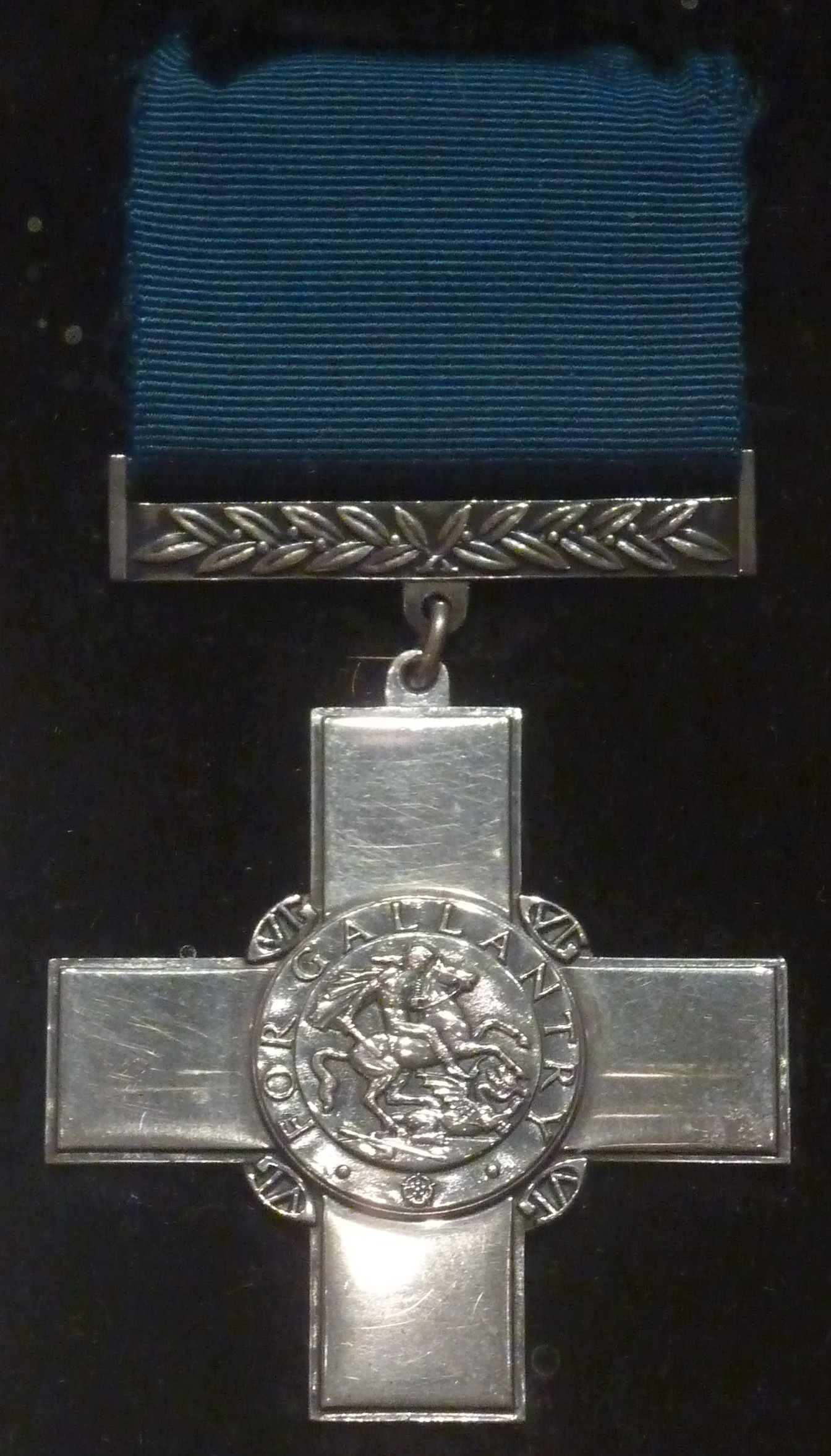
The George Cross

On other occasions in the Far East, survivors were brought aboard the Japanese submarine or warship to be shot or beheaded by sword. Following the sinking of the British merchant ship Behar in March 1944, prisoners were taken by the Japanese Navy who beheaded 69 of them in what became known as the Behar massacre.

Several trials were held post-war and any of the Japanese Naval officers who had survived were tried for their crimes.

== Awards ==
Merchant seamen (including women) who performed acts of great bravery were sometimes eligible for Naval gallantry awards but only received DSOs, DSCs or DSMs on occasions when they were involved in joint operations with the Royal Navy such as major amphibious landings (such as: North Africa, Sicily and D-Day.), or vital convoys such as Arctic Convoys PQ 17 and PQ 18 and the Operation Pedestal Malta Convoy.

At other times seamen might receive one of the grades of the Civil Division of the Order of the British Empire awards often presented for diligent work in the office by conscientious civil servants or the altruism of members of charitable organizations. It was recognized in Parliament that insufficient recognition was available for the seamen of the Merchant Navy and raised unsuccessfully in the House of Commons on 8 September, 29 September and 7 October 1942 for the institution of a Merchant Navy Cross for Gallantry.

In one peculiar case the great bravery of Captain Dudley Mason of SS Ohio transporting vital fuel to besieged Malta in Operation Pedestal was recognized with a George Cross which is awarded for acts of greatest bravery "not in the face of the enemy" and "away from the frontline." Capt. Mason could not have been awarded the Victoria Cross since he was a civilian. Mason brought his tanker to Malta burning, due to leaking fuel, after being torpedoed by an Italian submarine which blew a hole 28 feet by 24 feet in her hull, after being bombed by Italian and German bombers, including the infamous JU 87 Stuka, during which they shot down a Stuka which crashed on the deck of Ohio, being machine gunned by enemy aircraft and attacked by Italian motor torpedo boats.

Summary table of awards
Award	No.
George Cross	5
Empire Gallantry Medal	1
Albert Medal	11
Knighthood	10
CBE	50
Distinguished Service Order	18
OBE	1,077
Distinguished Service Cross	213
George Medal	49
MBE	1,291
Distinguished Service Medal	421
Sea Gallantry Medal	24
British Empire Medal	1,717
Mention in Despatches	994
King's Commendation	2,568
Total	8,449

- CBE, Commander of the Order of the British Empire – awarded to Senior Masters of ocean liners such as RMS Queen Mary for long periods in command during multiple convoys or evacuation operations such as Selwyn Capon OBE the Master of the MV Empire Star who put to sea from Singapore under sustained air attack with his ship loaded with refugees and delivered them to safety. Sadly, on a later voyage in 1942, he and his lifeboat full of crew and passengers disappeared at sea after the ship was sunk.
- OBE, Officer of the Order of the British Empire – sometimes awarded following incidents of gallantry by Masters, Chief Engineers or senior mates or after service on many voyages in which attacks were suffered by bombers, motor torpedo boats, U-boats or mines, sustaining survivors during long periods in life boats or even for service while prisoners of war such as the awards to Chief Engineer William Falconer and Second Mate Alan McIntyre of the MV.Hauraki for great bravery while held by the Japanese. An OBE was awarded to Alfred Hill, Master of the "Mandasor".

The SS Mandasor was sailing independently in the Indian Ocean when it was found that she was being shadowed by a German raider. During the hours of darkness the vessel put on all possible speed in an endeavour to escape but early next morning she was spotted and attacked by an aeroplane from the raider. Its fire carried away the main wireless aerial as well as the emergency aerial. The raider appeared on the horizon and a running chase ensued, whilst the enemy aircraft continued its attack. Gunfire from the Mandasor drove off the aeroplane and so badly damaged it that it sank before it could be recovered by the raider. The enemy continued the chase and closed steadily. A shell hit the vessel and set fire to the hold, while a second salvo registered hits on the bridge. The attack continued but the master did not abandon ship until the vessel was burning furiously. Whilst abandonment was taking place, the raider continued to fire, causing further casualties. The Mandasor was seen to sink while the survivors were being taken aboard the raider. They were later landed at Bordeaux and taken to a prisoner of war camp in Germany. The master displayed great courage and determination in the face of heavy odds. He did not abandon his ship until she was completely crippled and sinking, thereby depriving the raider of stores and provisions which were badly needed by the Germans.

- MBE – Member of the Order of the British Empire. Awarded for similar incidents to the OBE above but to more junior mates, engineers and radio officers. First Radio Officer Arthur H, (Dick)

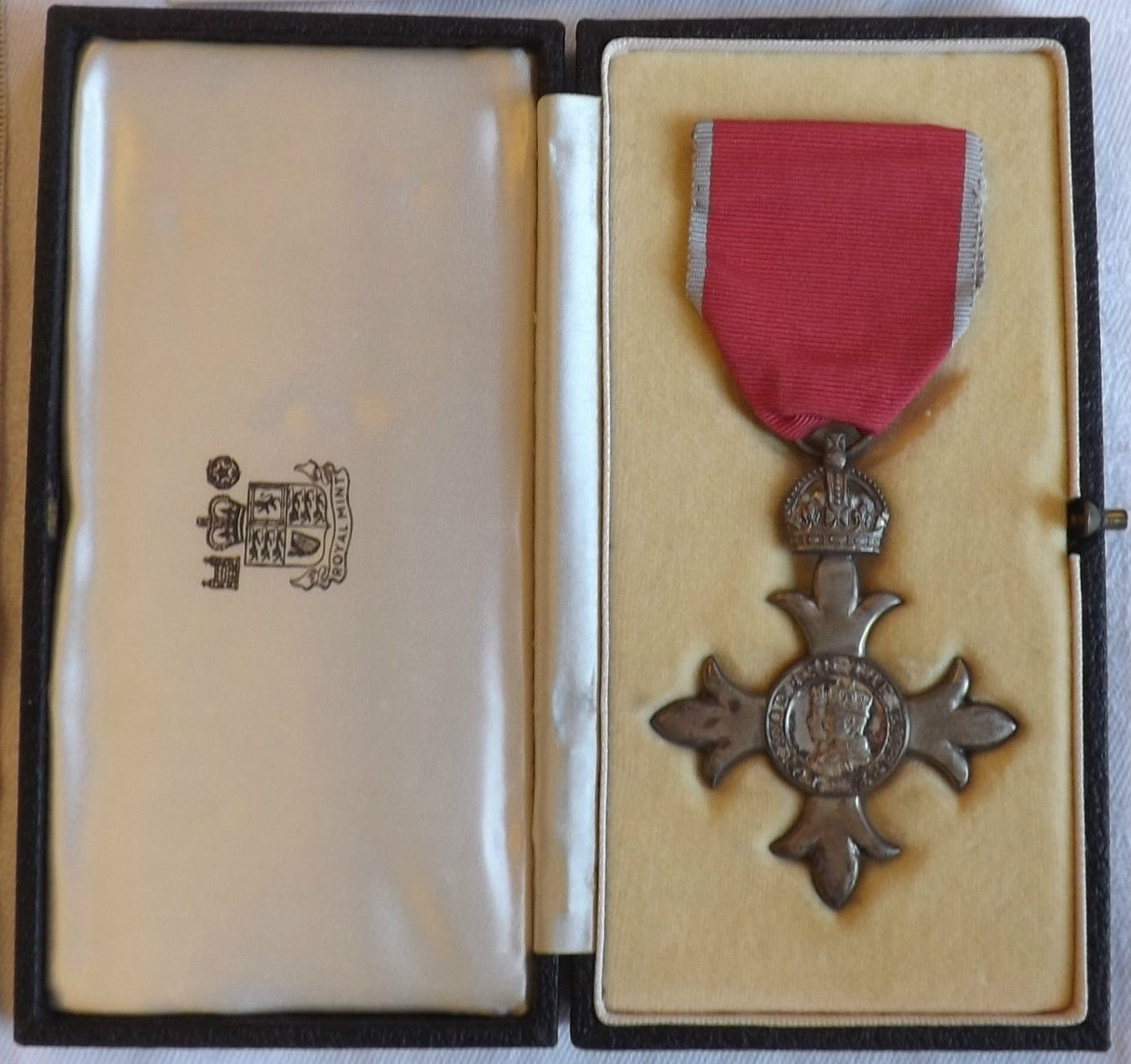
MBE George VI with case

Bird escaped from Milag prison camp and got home from Germany via Sweden. He was awarded an "MBE". Third Officer William McVicar and Ship's Surgeon Dr. Adeline Nancy Miller of SS Britannia both "received MBE's", the published citation stating: The ship was sailing alone when she was approached by a raider, which opened fire at long range. She replied with her defensive armament but a shell put her main gun out of action and she suffered heavy structural damage. As her speed was less than that of the enemy, the Captain gave orders to abandon ship. A signal to this effect was made to the enemy, but the raider continued shelling, and holed many of the lifeboats. He sank the ship by gunfire and made off. During the action the Ship's Doctor, with perfect calm, attended to the wounded and dying. She continued her good work after the company had taken to the lifeboats and, by her efforts, saved many lives. The Third Officer was in charge of a lifeboat certified to hold fifty-eight people but which carried eighty-four. She was put before the wind, since she was otherwise unmanageable and, after a memorable voyage of twenty-two days, during which five Europeans and thirty-nine Indians died, a landfall was made. It was due to the courage, resolution and good seamanship of the Third Officer that the survivors reached safety.

- BEM, British Empire Medal. Virtually all BEMs were awarded to seamen for considerable bravery fighting fires.

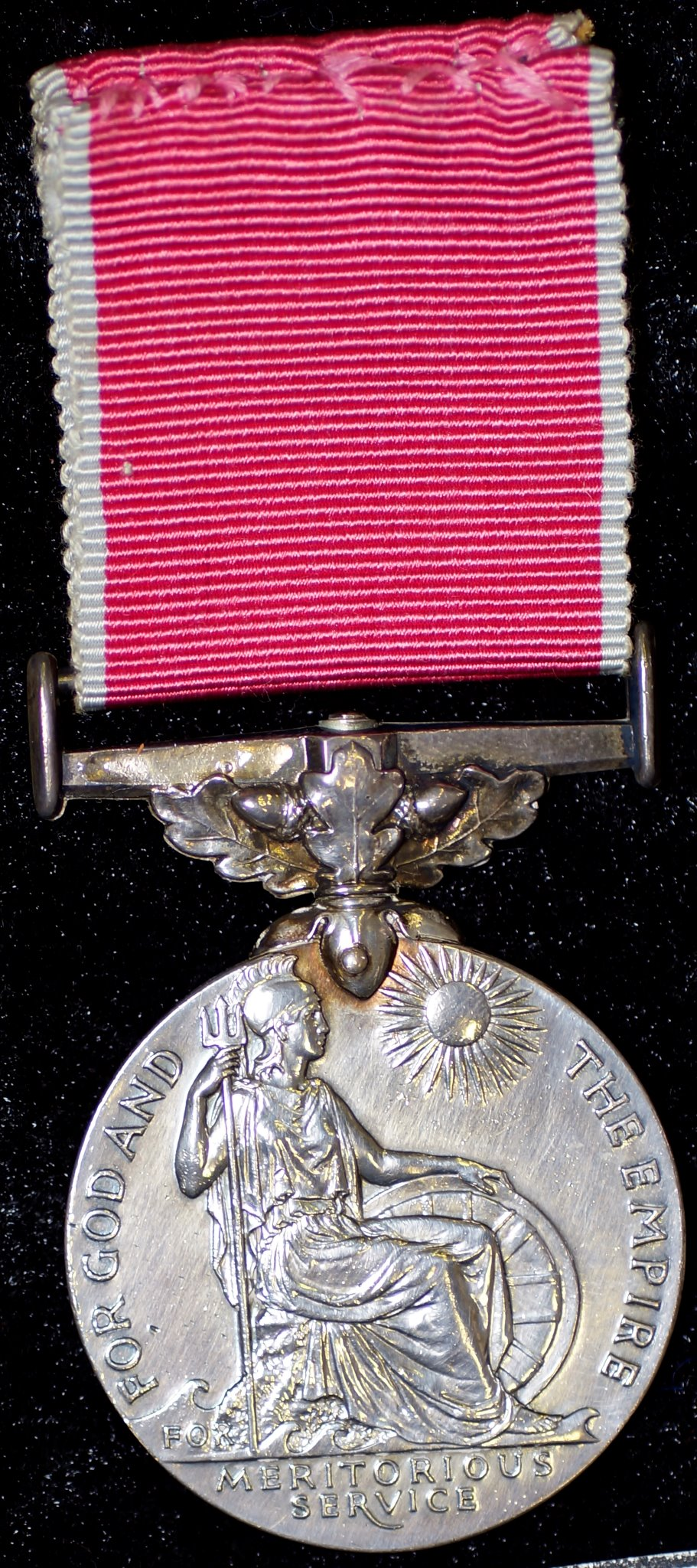
The British Empire Medal

ships, manning machine-guns against enemy attacks, helping to free trapped shipmates as ships sank beneath them or for bravery in lifeboats after their ships were sunk. An example is the award to Edward Gordon Elliott, Seaman. The ship was torpedoed at night and sank within sixteen minutes. Elliott, who had four ribs broken, went down with her but soon came to the surface where he saw a float with a man on it. He then helped another member of the crew to reach it. The float was not intended for sitting on and the weight of the three men partly submerged it. After drifting for four days they sighted a vessel and Elliott drew its attention by using a tobacco tin as a heliograph. It proved to be the submarine which had sunk the ship. The Commander gave the three men provisions, some of which were washed off the same night. Five days passed and one man died. The two survivors were attacked night and day by sharks, who tried to sweep them off with their tails. After twelve days afloat they were rescued. Elliott's succour of his shipmate when the ship sank, and his great fortitude and endurance were matched by his indomitable spirit.

- Commendations, King's Commendation for Brave Conduct (1916–1952). Many merchant seamen received the King's Commendation for Brave Conduct for their gallantry in action, for example John Morrison Ruthven, Chief Refrigeration Engineer, SS Clan Macarthur, was awarded a Posthumous Commendation in February 1944 for remaining aboard his torpedoed ship trying to rescue trapped seamen, he was lost with the trapped men.

Some seamen received multiple Commendations, for example Captain E.G.B. Martin, O.B.E. of the Merchant Navy who had ships sunk beneath him on three occasions before he was lost and received the award three times, on 23 October 1942, 27 August 1943, and finally Posthumously on 22 June 1945, in addition to an Order of the British Empire (Officer) Civil Division on 2 June 1944. Recognizing the inadequate recognition of the bravery of merchant seamen the London-based shipping insurers Lloyd's of London, privately produced a decoration for gallantry which became known as Lloyds War Medal for Bravery and quickly became a very highly respected award.

== Notable merchant seamen ==
1. Chick Henderson – singer
2. Thomas Wilkinson – recipient of the Victoria Cross
3. Peter de Neumann – "The Man from Timbuctoo"
4. Dudley Mason – recipient of the George Cross
5. Kevin McClory – Irish Movie Director
6. Lucian Freud – Artist and painter
7. Thomas Kelly – recipient of the George Cross
8. Richard Been Stannard – recipient of the Victoria Cross
9. Robert Arthur Owens – New Zealand personality
10. Frederick Treves BEM, Lloyds Medal – actor
11. Freddie Lennon – father of John Lennon
12. James Redmond – BBC broadcaster
13. Dudley Pope – Author
14. Markey Robinson – Boxer and artist.
15. Kenji Takaki – Japanese – prisoner in Germany 1940–45, later movie actor.
16. Mark Arnold-Forster DSO, DSC – journalist and author.
17. Frank Laskier – Merchant seaman author of "My Name is Frank".

== Bibliography ==
- Lane, Tony (1990). The Merchant Seamen's War. Manchester University Press. ISBN 0-7190-2397-1.
- Middlebrook, Martin (1977). Convoy. Penguin Books. ISBN 0-713909277.
- Hurd, Archibald (1943). Britain's Merchant Navy. Odhams Press. ASIN B004ALCBV6.
- Slader, John (1988). The Red Duster at War. William Kimber. ISBN 0-718306791.
- Slader, John (1994). The Fourth Service. Robert Hale. ISBN 0-709048483.
- Bennett, G H (1999). Survivors: British Merchant Seamen in the Second World War. Hambledon. ISBN 1-852851821.
- Hope, Ronald (1982). The Seaman's World. Harrap. ISBN 0245538933.
- Dyer, Jim (1988). Death & Donkey's Breakfasts. D & E Books. ASIN B000ZPHVIY.
- Sibley, David (1997). The Behar Massacre. A. Lane Publishing. ISBN 1-897666136.
- Linskey, Bill (1999). No Longer Required. Pisces Press. ISBN 0953728501.
- Scarlett, R. J. (1992). Under Hazardous Circumstances. Naval & Military. ISBN 0948130490.
- Peppit, Tom (2000). The Crew. Chaffcutter Books. ISBN 0953242226.
- Foss, Denis (1992). Shoot A Line. Linden Hall. ISBN 9780948747113.
- Bird, Arthur (1995). Farewell Milag. Literatours Books. ISBN 0951347519.
- Thomas, Gabe (1995). MILAG: Merchant Navy prisoners of war. Milag PoW Association. ISBN 0952549808.
- Bridgland, Tony (2002). Waves of Hate. Leo Cooper. ISBN 0850528224.
- Edwards, Bernard (1991). Blood and Bushido. Self Publishing Association. ISBN 185421134X.
- Elphick, Peter (1999). Life Line – The Merchant Navy at War. Chatham Publishing. ISBN 1861761007.
- Batten, John (1947). Dirty Little Collier. Hutchinson. ASIN B004WZL9DQ.
- Schofield, Brian (1968). The Rescue Ships. William Blackwood.
- Mulligan, Timothy (1999). Neither Sharks Nor Wolves. Chatham Publishing. ISBN 1861761198.
- Pearce, Frank (1996). Heroes of the Fourth Service. Robert Hale. ISBN 0709058799.
- Herzog, Bodo (1970). U-boats in Action. Ian Allan. OCLC 560938442.
- Crabb, Brian James (2006). Beyond the Call of Duty. The Loss of British Commonwealth Mercantile and Service Women at Sea during the Second World War. Shaun Tyas. ISBN 1-900289-66-0.
- Crabb, Brian James (2015). Passage to Destiny. The Sinking of the SS Khedive Ismail in the Sea War against Japan. Shaun Tyas. ISBN 978-1-907730-41-2.
- Crabb, Brian James (2002). The Forgotten Tragedy. The Story of the Sinking of HMT Lancastria. Shaun Tyas. ISBN 1-900289-50-4.
