= The Long and the Short and the Tall (play) =

1959 play by Willis Hall

- Written by: Willis Hall
- Characters: Sergeant R. 'Mitch' Mitchem; Corporal Edward 'Johnno' Johnstone; Lance-Corporal A. J. Macleish; Private C. 'Bammo' Bamforth; Private T. E. 'Taff' Evans; Private P. 'Smudger' Smith; Private Samuel 'Sammy' Whitaker
- Mute: Japanese Soldier
- Subject: Japanese Invasion of British Malaya during World War II.
- Setting: January 1942; An abandoned tin mine in the Malayan jungle

Premiere
- Date: 7 January 1959
- Place: Royal Court Theatre, London

The Long and the Short and the Tall is a play written by British playwright Willis Hall.

Set during the Second World War, the play was commissioned by the Oxford Theatre Group and first performed by that company at Cranston Street Hall, Edinburgh from 27 August to 13 September 1958, as part of the Edinburgh Festival Fringe. Directed by Peter Dews, this original production used the title The Disciplines of War. The play's English premiere happened almost simultaneously, with a run at Nottingham Playhouse from 1 to 13 September, this time under the title Boys, It's All Hell! and directed by Val May.

Its title finally adjusted to The Long and the Short and the Tall (a quote from the 1917 song "Bless 'Em All"), the play was produced at the Royal Court Theatre in London on 7 January 1959; it was directed by Lindsay Anderson and starred Peter O'Toole and Robert Shaw. It was Anderson's first major production for the Royal Court, transferring to London's West End on 8 April and running until 4 July.

A film adaptation was released in 1961. Directed by Leslie Norman, it stars Laurence Harvey, Richard Harris, Richard Todd and David McCallum. A television version followed in 1979, starring Michael Kitchen, Mark McManus and Richard Morant.

== Plot ==
The play is set in British Malaya in 1942, during the Battle of Malaya. The characters are a patrol of British Army soldiers; the play's events take place in an abandoned hut in the middle of the Malayan jungle. Tension rises as the patrol's radio malfunctions and a Japanese soldier stumbles upon them.

== Characters / cast ==
- Sergeant R. 'Mitch' Mitchem - The leader of the patrol, tough and experienced (Robert Shaw)
- Corporal Edward (Ted) 'Johnno' Johnstone - The second-in-command, as tough and experienced as Mitchem, but far more callous (Edward Judd)
- Lance-Corporal A. J. 'Mac' Macleish - A Scotsman, recently made up to lance-corporal, but has no more experience than the privates (none of whom have seen action), intelligent, short-tempered and moral (Ronald Fraser)
- Private C. 'Bammo' Bamforth - A Londoner, witty, rebellious and hates authority, a classic barrack-room lawyer (Peter O'Toole)
- Private T. E. 'Taff' Evans - A Welshman, pleasant and easy-going (Alfred Lynch)
- Private P. 'Smudger' Smith - A Northerner, a quiet, family man (Bryan Pringle)
- Private Samuel 'Sammy' Whitaker - A Geordie, the youngest member of the patrol and its radio operator, very nervy (David Andrews)
- Japanese Soldier - Doesn't speak at any point during the play, but still plays a major role (Kenji Takaki)

Albert Finney was originally cast as the North Country Private Bamforth but due to appendicitis he was replaced by the then unknown O'Toole, who turned the character into a Cockney. O'Toole's understudy (who never went on) was Michael Caine. Caine later played O'Toole's role on a Scottish tour of the play with Frank Finlay as Sergeant Mitchem and Terence Stamp as Whitaker. Fraser and Takaki reprised their roles in the film version.

== Television adaptations ==
A 30 minute excerpt of the play was filmed for British TV in 1959 with the play's original cast. No recording is known to exist.

A 3 x 30 minute serial was produced by BBC Schools, and broadcast on BBC One between 18 September and 2 October 1979. It was later presented as a single 85 minute compilation on BBC Two on 27 June 1981.
