= Kenji Takaki =

Japanese-British actor (1894–1984)

- Born: Kenji Takaki; 10 March 1894; Japan
- Died: 5 May 1984 (aged 90); London, England
- Occupations: Merchant Seaman and Actor
- Years active: 1956–1970

Kenji Takaki (10 March 1894 – 5 May 1984) was a Japanese-British merchant seaman and actor in both the theatre and cinema. He was of Japanese descent and played small roles in a number of mainly British films as well as being a character extra in others.

== Life ==
Kenji Takaki, also known as Kengi or Genji, was born in Ehime Ken, Japan, on the island of Shikoku. In 1906 he arrived at Liverpool as a passenger on board the RMS Cedric a liner of the White Star Line from the United States in search of a better life.

Takaki became a seaman some time prior to 1916 travelling to various ports around America and to and fro across the Pacific Ocean. His ships included the Tokai Maru in 1916, the Seiko Maru (previously HMAS Mallina) and the SS Portfield (1920). From 1926 he was employed by the Larrinaga Steamship Company of Liverpool which sailed to various destinations around the world. In 1935 he entered the British Merchant navy as a seaman, was naturalized in 1936 and obtained a British passport. His Continuous Certificate of Discharge showed he made 45 voyages between 1918 and 1940.

Early in World War Two his ship was captured and he was interned in a Prisoner-of-war camp because of his British papers. He was transferred to Marlag und Milag Nord, a prison camp specifically for members of the Merchant Navy, located east of Bremen, and held in captivity until the end of the war.

Following the war he moved to London where he lived for most of the rest of his life dying in 1984 at the age of 90 years.

== Working history ==
While a prisoner of the Germans, Takaki made good use of his talents to fill the boredom of camp life, performing on odd occasions in the prison camp theatre. Nat Bocking relates the story of John Brantom, a Cabin boy and internee of the same camp, who recalls that, "...gambling was widespread and by far the most popular pastime.", and that Takaki, known as Jimmy in the camp, had constructed a crude roulette wheel and was quite successful. Much of what he won went to bribe guards for the camps subversion activities. He was also able to buy a piano for the theatre but was not able to bring his profits out on release.

Following the war he began to make the occasional appearances in small roles as a character actor on the stage whenever a gentleman of Asian appearance was called for. His major theatrical role was that of 'Tojo' in the Royal Court Theatre production of the play The Long and the Short and the Tall written by Willis Hall in 1959. Although he had no spoken English dialog his part was crucial in showing the juxtaposition between the other characters.

He appeared in several British films in the 1950s and 1960s. He would best be remembered for his roles in A Town Like Alice and The Long and the Short and the Tall. In the former he played Sergeant Takagi, a soldier in the Imperial Japanese Army, tasked with escorting a group of women prisoners from camp to camp, while in the latter he reprised his role of 'Tojo'. In both these films his characterization played out in a somewhat different light to the views expressed in the propaganda of the time in which they were set. As in a few other of his roles he spoke little or no English dialog in these two films but his character lent a touch of poignancy which enhance ones' empathy to his character.

== Filmography ==
Year	Title	Role	Notes
1956	A Town Like Alice	Japanese Sergeant	
1957	Sea Wife	Submarine Interpreter	
1958	The Camp on Blood Island	Japanese Patrol	Uncredited
1961	The Long and the Short and the Tall	'Tojo'	
1963	55 Days at Peking	Old Man	Uncredited
1963	The Cool Mikado	Ho Ho	
1965	A High Wind in Jamaica	Cook	
1965	The Saint	Angkor	Episode: "Sign of the Claw"
1970	The Last Grenade	Te Ching	Uncredited
