= The Long and the Short and the Tall (film) =

1961 British film by Leslie Norman

- 1961 British quad format film poster
- Directed by: Leslie Norman
- Screenplay by: Wolf Mankowitz
- Based on: The Long and the Short and the Tall (play) by Willis Hall
- Produced by: Michael Balcon
- Starring: Richard Todd; Laurence Harvey; Richard Harris
- Cinematography: Erwin Hillier
- Edited by: Gordon Stone
- Music by: Stanley Black
- Color process: Black and white
- Production companies: Michael Balcon Productions; Associated British
- Distributed by: Warner-Pathé Distributors Ltd. Continental Distributing (US)
- Release dates: 16 February 1961 (London); 17 February 1961 (United Kingdom)
- Running time: 106 minutes
- Country: United Kingdom
- Language: English

The Long and the Short and the Tall (released as Jungle Fighters in the US and Canada) is a 1961 British war film directed by Leslie Norman and starring Richard Todd, Laurence Harvey and Richard Harris. The film, which is based on a 1959 play with the same name, by Willis Hall, takes place in 1942 during the Malayan Campaign.

The title comes from the second line of the First World War song "Bless 'Em All", which became very popular during the Second World War following recordings from singers such as Vera Lynn.

== Plot ==
During the Japanese invasion of Burma in 1942, a seven-strong British sonic deception unit on a short jungle exercise hides from the rain in a hut at an abandoned tin mine. The men constantly bicker, often provoked by the bullying Corporal Johnstone or the forever mocking Bamforth. While Sergeant Mitchem and Corporal Johnstone are reconnoitering, Lance-Corporal Macleish ("Mac"), provoked, beats up Bamforth. Tension rises as they fail to make radio contact with their base and pick up a Japanese broadcast, indicating that they are nearby. A Japanese scout appears: Johnstone grabs him and tells Taff to stab him. Taff cannot kill him in cold blood and, before Bamforth does, the returning Mitchem says they must take him back for interrogation.

Mitchem places Bamforth in charge of the prisoner, who Bamforth names Tojo. Bamforth realises Tojo is just another soldier, bonding over pictures of Tojo's family. Johnstone, enraged, tries to destroy the pictures but Bamforth, his frustrations boiling over, beats him up, risking a court martial. Mitchem sends Mac and Smudge to reconnoiter. They see a small patrol sending two soldiers to find Tojo. Knowing this endangers their patrol, Mac kills one but the other escapes. Mac and Smudge return to warn the patrol which tries to radio base to warn them, even though it may reveal their position. A taunting Japanese broadcast accelerates their decision to flee for their base.

They head for home. Mitchem now realises that the prisoner is a liability rather than as asset and Johnstone keeps offering to kill him. The group, temporararily blocked by a flash flood, take a break in the mine canyons and Bamforth is sent to keep watch. Johnstone spots Mac and Tojo enjoying a cigarette, and cruelly points out that the cigarettes are British, and Tojo must have stolen them from a British soldier he had killed. This affects the men who turn on Tojo. Johnstone sadistically rips up Tojo's cherished family photos and Mac searches and slaps him. Upon hearing the commotion, Bamforth returns and explains he gave Tojo the cigarettes. The men are ashamed and try to make amends by gathering and returning Tojo's possessions. Johnstone maliciously says that Tojo's cigarette case was made in Birmingham. As the men again grow hostile, Bamford responds that Tojo could have traded for it, forcing the youngest member (Whittaker) to admit that he does this.

The flood is receding and Mitchem asks Whittaker to make a last attempt to contact base before they leave. They plan to abandon the mules, blow up the special equipment and kill the prisoner Tojo. Bamforth is alone in protesting against killing Tojo and appeals for support from the other men without success. The radio responds to Whittaker's efforts but only a Japanese message can be heard. Tojo approaches him, trying in Japanese to explain the message. Panicking about the Japanese broadcast and ashamed from his unveiling as a looter, Whittaker mistakes Tojo's movements and shoots him dead with a machine gun. The radio crackles into life again and a Japanese accented English announces that the patrol is surrounded and demands their surrender. Whittaker's firing will have further alerted the Japanese.

Mitchem and Bamforth form a rear guard to allow the others led by Johnstone to escape. The rear guard are soon defending against the main Japanese force. As the main group emerge, a Japanese sniper dispatches Taff and Mac. Although Whittaker is cut off, Johnstone tells Smudge they must return to Mitchem. As they flee, Smudge is also killed.

Mitchem is shocked to see the superficially injured Johnstone back alone but is shot by a sniper. As the Japanese close in, Johnstone implores Bamforth to surrender. Bamforth however shoots at the explosives. The explosion kills many attackers but also causes a rockfall, killing Bamforth. Johnstone strides forward and, taking a white scarf from a dead Japanese soldier, surrenders. Whittaker is found cowering under a bush by Japanese soldiers and is also taken by the Japanese and is shouted at and mocked just as the British treated Tojo.

== Cast ==
- Richard Todd as Sgt. Mitchem
- Laurence Harvey as Pte. Bamforth
- Richard Harris as Cpl. Johnstone
- Ronald Fraser as L/ Cpl. Macleish ‡
- David McCallum as Pte. Whitaker
- John Meillon as Pte. Smith
- John Rees as Pte. Evans
- Kenji Takaki as Tojo ‡

‡ Reprised role from original stage production.

== Production ==
Roy Ward Baker wanted to make the film at Rank but the company would not authorise the purchase of the rights. Associated British bought the film rights in April 1959 and assigned the role of the sergeant to Richard Todd. The movie was a co production between Associated British and Michael Balcon Productions Ltd - it was the first movie Balcon made since he left Ealing Studios.

According to Todd filming was postponed. The actor was disappointed with the script, Norman's plan to film in a studio and the decision to not cast Peter O'Toole. He wrote in his memoirs, "Leslie was a nice chap, but seemed rather indecisive and insecure."

The film was shot at Elstree Studios in 1960, where Richard Todd had starred in The Dam Busters a few years earlier. Todd loathed making the film, as he didn't get along with Laurence Harvey, In an interview many years later, he said, "I didn't enjoy working with Laurence Harvey... I took it for granted that they would cast Peter O'Toole, who was marvellous on stage, but they said they wanted a 'name'". He said it "was the most unpleasant film I ever worked on" blaming Harvey in particular for causing trouble; he said Harvey was a poor influence on Richard Harris, and that Leslie Norman was unable to control either, but that Harris' behaviour improved after Todd had a word with him.

Richard Harris later claimed Todd would stand on top of mounds of dirt to seem as tall as his co-stars. Leslie Norman was also unhappy he had to cast Laurence Harvey instead of Peter O'Toole. He felt Laurence Harvey and Richard Harris "let the film down... Harris because he resented Laurence Harvey, despised him and they didn't get on with Richard Todd". Norman says "I was very pleased with my side of the film in the end. It was all made in a studio, we never set foot outside for a month. I asked to go on location, but a jungle's pretty claustrophobic, for sure".

== Reception ==
=== Box office ===
According to Kine Weekly, the 12 most popular films at the British box office in 1961 were, in order, Swiss Family Robinson, The Magnificent Seven, Saturday Night and Sunday Morning, 101 Dalmatians, Polyanna, The Rebel, The Sundowners, Whistle Down the Wind, Butterfield 8, Carry On Regardless, The Parent Trap and The Long and the Short and the Tall.
