= Bless 'Em All =

Song performed by George Formby

Song by George Formby, Jr.
- Written: 1917
- Songwriters: Fred Godfrey, Robert Kewley

"Bless 'Em All", also known as "The Long and the Short and the Tall", is a war song. The words have been credited to Fred Godfrey in 1917 set to music composed by Robert Kewley, however, early versions of the song may have existed amongst British military personnel in the 1880s in India. It was first recorded by George Formby, Jr. in 1940, and it has been covered by a number of other artists including Gracie Fields and Vera Lynn. It served as a patriotic song during the Second World War.

== History ==
The origin of the song is not entirely clear. The song is said to have been written by Fred Godfrey set to music by Robert Kewley, although it is likely that the song existed earlier in various forms in all divisions of the British military. These early versions, instead of "bless 'em all", had "rob 'em all", "sod 'em all", or "fuck 'em all" as the recurrent phrase in the lyrics. Godfrey said that he thought up the lyrics for the song while serving with the Royal Naval Air Service (RNAS) at Dunkirk during the First World War, recalling in a 1941 letter to the Daily Mirror: "I wrote 'Bless 'Em All' while serving in the old RNAS in France in 1916. And, furthermore, it wasn't 'Bless'." However, questions remain if he actually wrote the lyrics as he claimed, furthermore his service record indicates that he only joined RNAS in January 1917. It has been suggested that Godfrey took an older song and changed one crucial word.

Les Cleveland (1984) writes that a version of the song titled "Fuck 'Em All" was a popular protest song by airmen serving on India's North West Frontier during the 1920s, and may have originated from there. However, Chelsea Pensioners who were interviewed by author Lewis Winstock indicated that the song was already current in the last decade of the 19th century. It has been proposed that the song was adapted from a folk song and first became popular among British servicemen in India in the 1880s.

The song later gained popularity among British and Commonwealth troops during the Second World War, and with a change of lyrics became a patriotic tune after being performed by singers such as Gracie Fields and Vera Lynn. It was also recorded by George Formby and Bertha Willmott among others. These songs were based on an arrangement by Jimmy Hughes and Frank Lake. Some sources credited the song to Jimmy Hughes, Frank Lake and Al Stillman.

== Lyrics ==
They say there's a troopship just leavin' Bombay, bound for old Blighty shore,
Heavily laden with time-expired men, bound for the land they adore.
There's many an airman just finishing his time, there's many a twirp signin' on.
You'll get no promotion this side of the ocean, so cheer up my lads, bless 'em all.

Bless 'em all,
Bless 'em all,
The long and the short and the tall,
Bless all the Sergeants and W.O. 1s,
Bless all the corp'rals and their blinkin'/bleedin' sons,
'Cos we're sayin' goodbye to 'em all.
As back to their billets they crawl,
You'll get no promotion this side of the ocean, so cheer up my lads, bless 'em all.

They say if you work hard you'll get better pay.
We've heard all that before.
Clean up your buttons and polish your boots,
Scrub out the barrack room floor.
There's many a rookie has taken it in, hook, line, and sinker an' all.
You'll get no promotion this side of the ocean, so cheer up my lads, bless 'em all.

Bless 'em all,
Bless 'em all,
The long and the short and the tall,
Bless all the sergeants and W.O. 1s,
Bless all the corp'rals and their blinkin'/bleedin' sons,
'Cos we're sayin' goodbye to 'em all.
As back to their billets they crawl,
You'll get no promotion this side of the ocean, so cheer up my lads, bless 'em all.

Now they say that the sergeant's a very nice chap, oh what a tale to tell.
Ask him for leave on a Saturday night; he'll pay your fare home as well.
There's many an airman has blighted his life through writing rude words on the wall.
You'll get no promotion this side of the ocean, so cheer up my lads, bless 'em all.

Bless 'em all,
Bless 'em all,
The long and the short and the tall,
Bless all the sergeants and W.O. 1s,
Bless all the corp'rals and their blinkin'/bleedin' sons,
'Cos we're sayin' goodbye to 'em all.
As back to their billets they crawl,
You'll get no promotion this side of the ocean, so cheer up my lads, bless 'em all.

Nobody knows what a twerp you have been, so cheer up my lads, bless 'em all.

== Irish version ==
A satirical version of the song became very popular in Ireland during the Second World War (known in The Republic of Ireland as the Emergency). The song was a reaction to the widespread rationing of tea, sugar, tobacco and other goods due to the drastic drop in imports, particularly from Britain. It poked fun at Ireland's Taoiseach Éamon de Valera and Minister Seán MacEntee who were blamed for the shortages and rationing. The line "the long and the short and the tall" had particular sarcastic resonance because De Valera was tall while McEntee was very short.

== In popular culture ==
Films

- The first verse of the song was sung in the propaganda film Tunisian Victory released by the US and the UK in 1944 (at 40' 38").
- The song was used as the title theme to the 1961 film The Long and the Short and the Tall.
- The song was sung and used as an instrumental theme in the 1941 film Confirm or Deny
- The song is sung by the characters in Captains of the Clouds (1942).
- "Bless' Em All" is sung by the pilots of the Polish Brigade of the Royal Air Force in the 1942 comedy film To Be Or Not To Be
- In the 1943 Canadian film Corvette K225 the song is sung by members of the crew and is used in an instrumental version as part of the score.
- The song is heard as a snippet in Guadalcanal Diary (1943), sung by the Marines on the island, as well as Marine Raiders (1944).
- The song is heard being sung in the Officer's Club in the 1949 film Twelve O'Clock High with Gregory Peck and Dean Jagger. In the AFI Catalog of Feature Films, the song is credited as "words and music by Jimmy Hughes, Frank Lake and Al Stillman".
- The song is featured in the film Chain Lightning with Humphrey Bogart, released in 1950. It is sung twice, and the melody is used as instrumental backing for the film's climax. As with Twelve O'Clock High, the AFI Catalog credits the song to Jimmy Hughes, Frank Lake, and Al Stillman.
- Towards the beginning of Breakthrough (1950) the song is heard being sung in an English pub.
- A version of the song was sung by United States Marines on the march to the Hungnam Evacuation after the Battle of Chosin Reservoir.
- The song is sung by the POWs in The Colditz Story (1954).
- An instrumental version is heard in the 1955 Clark Gable / Lana Turner movie Betrayed.
- The song is heard as a snippet in the Red Cross Service Club scene in the 1956 William Holden and Deborah Kerr film The Proud and Profane.
- The song, with altered lyrics, is sung by G.I.s on Guadalcanal in The Thin Red Line (1964).
- "Fuck 'Em All" is heard in the 2007 film Atonement being sung by soldiers as they wait to be evacuated from Dunkirk.
- A variation with lyrics "Ring them all, Ring them all" is used at the conclusion of Paul McCartney's "Give My Regards to Broad Street (film)".

Television

- Archie Bunker sings a few lines of the song in the final seconds of the season one episode "Success Story" of the TV show All in the Family.
- In the Magnum, P.I. episode "Echoes of the Mind Part I" Jonathan Higgins listens to a record of the song.
- The song was sung several times in the pub scene of a 1980 NBC television movie, The Secret War of Jackie's Girls, set in England in World War II.

Literature

- William Hjortsberg's biography of Richard Brautigan, Jubilee Hitchhiker, includes an account of Brautigan in 1967 joining several other poets and artists in a Chinese restaurant to celebrate Basil Bunting, who'd been invited to read at the San Francisco Museum of Art. Bunting led everyone in "an old British-army or service-person-overseas kind of song where everybody gets screwed." Hjortsberg calls it "Troop Ships Are Leaving Bombay," the first line of Formby's original lyric.

Sport

- Fans of Manchester City sang a song based on "Bless 'Em All" to commemorate their victory in the 1956 FA Cup Final. The song continues to be used as a football chant by fans of various teams, but may be in the form of "Fuck 'Em All".
