= Worzel Gummidge Turns Detective =

- Country of origin: United Kingdom
- Original language: English
- No. of series: 1
- No. of episodes: 4 (all lost)

Production
- Running time: 22 minutes

Original release
- Network: BBC
- Release: 10 February – 3 March 1953

Worzel Gummidge Turns Detective is a lost British children's television series, first aired by the BBC in 1953. It was the first TV manifestation of Barbara Euphan Todd's character who had already appeared on radio and would reappear on television 26 years later.

== Background ==
The series was adapted from a BBC radio serial based on Barbara Euphan Todd's Worzel Gummidge novels, following its success on Children's Hour. It was one of the first productions of the BBC Television Children's Department, formed in 1950 under Freda Lingstrom.

Although the character of Aunt Sally gave her name to one episode, she plays a minor role, appearing only briefly as Worzel's aunt, consistent with her limited presence in Todd's novels. The more prominent female character is Earthy Mangold, played by Mabel Constanduros, who portrays Worzel's wife — a role Constanduros had previously played on radio, having also co-written the original radio adaptation with her nephew Denis Constanduros.

The series was broadcast live, and no episodes are known to survive; the scripts were later drawn upon by Todd for her final Worzel Gummidge novel, Detective Worzel Gummidge (1963).

== Cast ==
- Frank Atkinson as Worzel Gummidge (4 episodes, 1953)
- Carol Olver as Penny (4 episodes, 1953)
- Mabel Constanduros as Earthy Mangold (4 episodes, 1953)
- Margaret Boyd as Mrs. Braithwaite (4 episodes, 1953)
- David Coote as Andrew (4 episodes, 1953)
- Janet Joye as Mrs. Bloomsbury-Barton (4 episodes, 1953)
- Alanna Boyce as Shirley Morgan (2 episodes, 1953)
- Vernon Smythe as Mr. Dyke (2 episodes, 1953)
- Totti Truman Taylor as Aunt Sally (1 episode, 1953)

== Episodes ==
- Enter Two Scarecrows (10 February 1953)
- Aunt Sally (17 February 1953)
- Gummidge, the Sweep (24 February 1953)
- Gummidge Disappears (3 March 1953)
