= Jon Pertwee =

English actor (1919–1996)

- Pertwee in 1946
- Born: John Devon Roland Pertwee; 7 July 1919; Kensington, London, England
- Died: 20 May 1996 (aged 76); Sherman, Connecticut, U.S.
- Resting place: Putney Vale Cemetery, London
- Education: Royal Academy of Dramatic Art
- Years active: 1936–1996
- Spouses: Jean Marsh (m. 1955; div. 1960); Ingeborg Rhoesa (m. 1960)
- Children: 2, including Sean
- Father: Roland Pertwee
- Relatives: Michael Pertwee (brother); Eva Moore (great-aunt); Jill Esmond (first cousin, once removed); Bill Pertwee (second cousin, once removed)
- Military service
- Allegiance: United Kingdom
- Branch: Royal Navy
- Service years: 1939–1945
- Rank: Ordinary seaman
- Service number: P/JX178358

John Devon Roland Pertwee (/ˈpɜːrtwiː/ PUR-twee; 7 July 1919 – 20 May 1996), known professionally as Jon Pertwee, was an English actor. He is best known for portraying the third incarnation of the Doctor in the television series Doctor Who from 1970 to 1974, as well as for starring in the BBC Radio sitcom The Navy Lark (1959–1977) and playing the title role in the television series Worzel Gummidge (1979–1981) and Worzel Gummidge Down Under (1987–1989).

Born into a family of actors and writers, Pertwee's rebellious behaviour led to his expulsion from two schools and the Royal Academy of Dramatic Art. He subsequently took small parts in repertory theatre, including productions written by his playwright father Roland, and later performed in radio and films. During World War II, Pertwee served in the Royal Navy and worked in the Naval Intelligence Division. Post-war, he became known for his comedic voices and impressions, particularly on the radio programme Mediterranean Merry-Go-Round. He played Chief Petty Officer Pertwee and various other roles in The Navy Lark, and appeared in four films in the Carry On series from 1964 to 1992.

In 1969, Pertwee was cast as the Third Doctor in the BBC science fiction television series Doctor Who. Despite his reputation as a comic actor, Pertwee introduced an action-oriented "leading man" interpretation of the character, influenced by contemporary espionage fiction and his own enthusiasm for gadgets and fast vehicles. He later hosted the ITV game show Whodunnit? (1974–1978). Pertwee enjoyed renewed success as the scarecrow Worzel Gummidge in a Southern Television adaptation of Barbara Euphan Todd's children's books; after its cancellation he successfully campaigned for a sequel series produced by TVNZ. In his later years he maintained a close association with Doctor Who by attending many fan conventions and reprising the role in various productions, including in the anniversary television specials "The Five Doctors" (1983) and Dimensions in Time (1993).

== Early life ==
=== Family background ===
John Devon Roland Pertwee was born in Kensington, London, on 7 July 1919, the second son of writer-actor Roland Pertwee and stage actress Avice Scholtz. His paternal ancestors were aristocratic French Huguenots, descended from Charlemagne, who fled France and settled in England in the late 17th century. The family name "de Perthuis de Laillevault", which derives from Pertuis, was anglicised to "Pertwee". Pertwee described his mother as having "Austrian/German" heritage.

Many of Pertwee's relatives were in show business. His older brother Michael was a writer for film and stage and, with Roland, created the first British television soap opera The Grove Family in 1957. Pertwee's second cousin once removed was actor Bill Pertwee. His great-aunt was actress Eva Moore; her daughter was actress Jill Esmond. Pertwee's godfather was actor Henry Ainley, a close friend of his father; Ainley's son Anthony later appeared opposite Pertwee in the 1983 Doctor Who episode "The Five Doctors". Pertwee stated in 1976 that "the theatre seemed such an obvious thing to do that I started rebelling before I'd even joined it. Because it was the family business I never had to struggle to join it—I took it for granted, which is maybe why I've never taken it seriously enough."

Pertwee's parents divorced in 1921 following Avice's involvement in an affair. Pertwee and his brother Michael were raised by their paternal grandmother in Surrey and Kensington. Roland remarried in 1927, and the Pertwee brothers moved back in with him and their new step-brother. Pertwee remained estranged from his mother, who also remarried, and did not bond with her when they were briefly reconciled in his teens.

=== Education ===
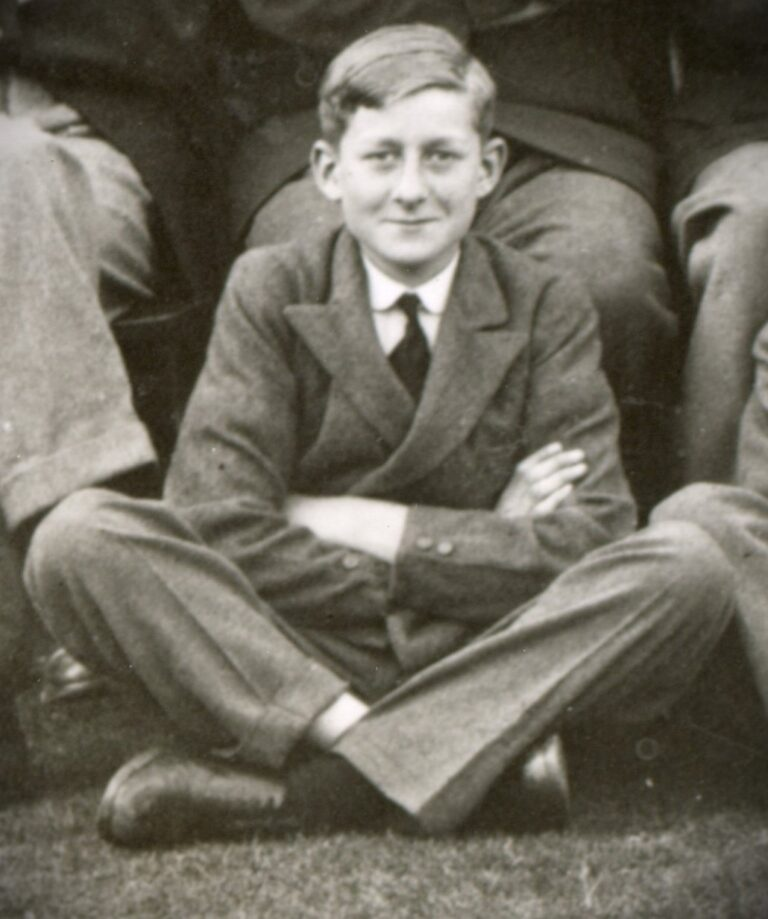
Pertwee at Sherborne School in 1933

Pertwee attended Aldro School, a preparatory boarding school in Surrey, but was expelled at the age of seven after he broke a lavatory chain by swinging on it while mimicking Tarzan. At his next school, Wellington House preparatory in Westgate-on-Sea, Kent, he put on theatrical shows. At 13 years of age, Pertwee joined his brother at Sherborne School in Dorset. In his 1984 autobiography, Pertwee recalled that he was expelled from the school after threatening a prefect who refused to accept that two older students were bullying him. He attended Frensham Heights School in Surrey, where at the age of 16 he started an open-air theatre company.

In 1936, Pertwee auditioned for the Central School of Speech and Drama but he was failed for his lisp. He was admitted to the Royal Academy of Dramatic Art but "asked to leave" because he refused to play a Greek wind in Euripides' Iphigenia. Another account for his expulsion was that he allegedly wrote rude remarks on the lavatory walls about the principal, who considered him talentless, though Pertwee denied this in a 1984 interview. Pertwee was motivated by an encounter with Charles Laughton, who stated that dismissal from RADA was the proper way for an actor to start their career.

== Career ==
=== 1936–1939: Early acting roles ===
While still at school, Pertwee worked as a circus performer riding the wall of death on a motorcycle with a toothless lion in the sidecar. In 1936, after leaving RADA, he briefly toured the country in a double-decker bus with the Arts League of Service Travelling Theatre, directed by Donald Wolfit. In 1937, he joined Springfield Theatre in Jersey, and adopted the name "Jon" from a misspelling on a Springfield Theatre billing. He was dismissed from the theatre company for playing practical jokes.

Pertwee took small repertory theatre parts in Birmingham, York and Liverpool. In April 1938, he joined the Rex Lesley-Smith Repertory Players at West Pier, Brighton, where he appeared in his father's play Interference. Pertwee starred in The Simpleton of the Unexpected Isles at the Festival Theatre, Cambridge, alongside actress Sarah Churchill; Pertwee and the theatre company regularly shared tea breaks with her father, future Prime Minister Winston Churchill. Later in 1938, he appeared in Goodbye, Mr. Chips at the Q Theatre. Pertwee made his BBC radio debut in Voyage to the Sun, transmitted 13 March 1938. A week later he narrated a Northern Ireland production of Lillibulero.

In 1938, Pertwee was playing a small part in his father's play To Kill a Cat at the Aldwych Theatre. When his co-star John Salew was unable to attend the recording of a radio programme, he sent Pertwee in his place. Salew was fired and Pertwee was hired as his replacement, which led to regular work in Radio Luxembourg productions such as Marmaduke Brown, Backstage Wife, Young Widow Jones, Mr Reeder and Stella Dallas. Pertwee also made small appearances in various film productions by Denham Film Studios, such as Dinner at the Ritz (1937), A Yank at Oxford (1938) and Young Man's Fancy (1939). He appeared with his father in The Four Just Men (1939), a film Roland co-wrote, in which Pertwee delivered his first on-screen film lines.

=== 1939–1945: Naval career ===
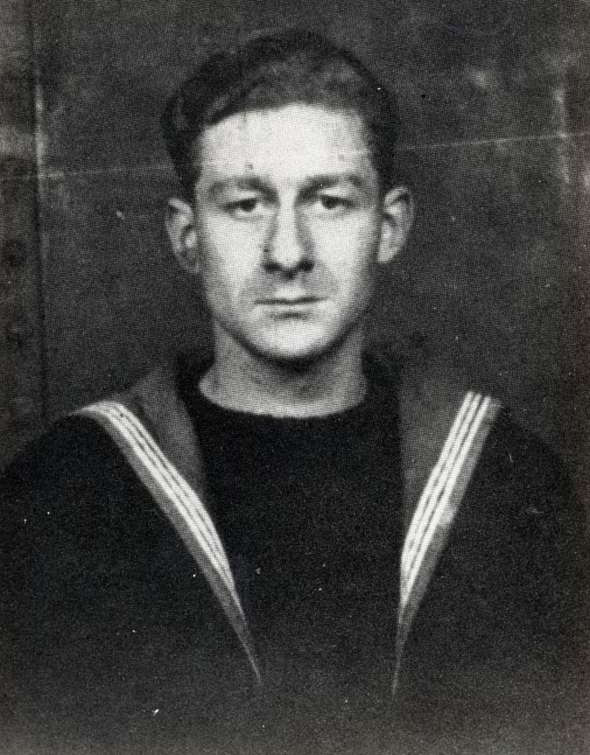
Pertwee in the Royal Navy, c. 1940

Pertwee's acting career was halted by the outbreak of the Second World War. He entered the Royal Navy in late 1939 as an ordinary seaman, service number P/JX178358, and spent six years in service. He met naval sailor and future Doctor Who co-star Patrick Troughton several times during the war. Pertwee was a crew member of the ill-fated battlecruiser HMS Hood from 29 November 1940, but was transferred off the ship for officer training only weeks before she was sunk by the German battleship Bismarck in May 1941; all but three men aboard were killed. He was injured in a bombing raid at Portsmouth barracks, which resulted in back problems later in life. Pertwee was posted to the Isle of Man as a sub-lieutenant, where he was one of the founding members of the Service Players, an amateur drama society. During his time in the navy, Pertwee woke up after a drunken birthday celebration in port to find a tattoo of a cobra on his right forearm—it is visible in his first Doctor Who story Spearhead from Space (1970).

Pertwee was transferred to the Security Staff of the Naval Intelligence Division in Westminster, where he worked alongside future Prime Minister James Callaghan, future James Bond author Ian Fleming and the man considered to be the inspiration for Bond, Patrick Dalzel-Job. Pertwee was initially dissatisfied with his appointment as he did not excel at "code and mathematics", but was encouraged when he learnt his commanding officer intended to utilise his acting abilities. One of his first jobs involved touring the country to lecture service branches on the importance of maintaining security. In 1994, Pertwee recalled, "I did all sorts. Teaching commandos how to use escapology equipment, compasses in brass buttons, secret maps in white cotton handkerchiefs, pipes you could smoke that also fired a .22 bullet. All sorts of incredible things. Now that suited me perfectly, as I have always loved gadgets." According to Pertwee, he made "a few shillings" from selling Winston Churchill's cigar ends left over from security meetings, rather than disposing of them as requested.

Pertwee was later reassigned to naval broadcasting. He was talent-spotted by producer Eric Barker, who involved Pertwee in the radio programme Mediterranean Merry-Go-Round—the naval version of the variety show Merry-Go-Round—which was intended to maintain the morale of the British armed forces. Pertwee's first episode was transmitted on 30 November 1945. After the war, Mediterranean Merry-Go-Round became the civilian programme Waterlogged Spa.

=== 1946–1968: The Navy Lark and other post-war roles ===
Pertwee and Eric Barker in 1946

Pertwee became known for his ability to create and perform a variety of comedic characters, voices and accents, and he worked prolifically in radio. Additionally, his live television debut was on 1 November 1946, introducing the hour-long variety show Little Show. His first television acting role was as the judge in the 1946 television film Toad of Toad Hall. Two Mediterranean Merry-Go-Round television broadcasts aired in 1947. Pertwee appeared in the radio programmes Navy Mixture (1947), The Adventures of Captain Kettle (1947), Up the Pole (1947–1948) and Listen, My Children (1948). In 1949, the Radio Times described him as "the versatile Jon Pertwee – a brilliant comedian".

Pertwee appeared in the crime film Murder at the Windmill (1949) and first received star billing for the comedy film Will Any Gentleman...? (1953), the latter featuring future First Doctor actor William Hartnell. Pertwee was noted for his physical resemblance to American actor Danny Kaye, and he doubled for Kaye in the London scenes of the film Knock on Wood (1954).

Pertwee (pictured in 1950) as the postmaster of Puffney, a comedic radio character he originated in Waterlogged Spa

One of Pertwee's most popular Waterlogged Spa characters was an incompetent West Country postmaster with the catchphrase "It doesn’t matter what you do, as long as you tears [the letters] up". The character featured in a spin-off radio series, Puffney Post Office, which began airing on 21 April 1950. In 1953, Pertwee played Ugly Sister Buttercup in the pantomime Cinderella at the London Palladium. In 1955, the radio programme Pertwee's Progress was launched as a vehicle for Pertwee; it lasted 13 episodes. Beginning in 1955, he appeared in five editions of the monthly variety series Round the Bend. Pertwee played Norman Evans' sidekick in Evans Abode (1956–1957), a series of four television specials. He appeared on the radio programme Workers' Playtime (1956–61). In 1957, he presented the daytime television series Mainly for Women. Pertwee also worked on stage in the 1950s, which included performing as a vaudeville comedian at the Glasgow Empire Theatre and sharing a bill with Max Wall and Jimmy James. Pertwee sustained further back injuries when co-star Bernard Bresslaw fell on him on set of the science fiction comedy film The Ugly Duckling (1959).

Pertwee's best known radio role was as Chief Petty Officer Pertwee in the BBC Radio sitcom The Navy Lark (1959–1977), which ran for 240 episodes. The sitcom followed antics aboard the fictional HMS Troutbridge, and co-starred Leslie Phillips, Richard Caldicot and Ronnie Barker. Its maritime setting was familiar to Pertwee considering his naval background, and he also served as a resource for the writers. Pertwee's primary character was named after him, as was common with many comedy radio series at the time. He also voiced additional characters including Commander Wetherby, Vice-Admiral ''Burbly'' Burwasher and a villainous character called the Master, whom Pertwee based on Herbert Beerbohm Tree. Pertwee did not appear in The Navy Lark's 1959 film adaptation. In his 1996 memoir he attributed this to producer Herbert Wilcox refusing to employ his co-star Dennis Price on the grounds that "he was gay", a decision Pertwee made clear that he thought "was ridiculous". Shortly after voicing his support of Price he found out he had been dropped from the film's cast and replaced by Ronald Shiner.

Pertwee played Marcus Lycus in a 1963 production of A Funny Thing Happened on the Way to the Forum at the Strand Theatre. Pertwee was disappointed that the part was recast with Phil Silvers in the 1966 film adaptation, which was adapted by Melvin Frank and Pertwee's brother Michael. However, Silvers proved difficult during filming and Jon Pertwee was flown to the set in Madrid on short notice to replace him. According to Pertwee, Silvers' behaviour improved when he learned that he was about to be replaced, and Pertwee ultimately appeared in a smaller role instead. Pertwee played Sidney Tait in the comedy film Ladies Who Do (1963). Pertwee guested on Desert Island Discs on 12 October 1964, where he chose "Georgia on My Mind" by Ray Charles as his favourite track. In 1965, Pertwee starred with Cilla Black in the pantomime Little Red Riding Hood at the Wimbledon Theatre, and appeared in David Croft's BBC pantomime Mother Goose that Christmas.

Pertwee moved from variety acting to comic acting with appearances in three Carry On films: Carry On Cleo (1964) as the soothsayer; Carry On Cowboy (1965) as Sheriff Earp; and Carry On Screaming! (1966) as Dr. Fettle. In a 1986 interview, Pertwee said he had not wanted to appear in more Carry On films because he believed the series had adversely affected the careers of other regular actors such as Kenneth Williams, Sid James and Joan Sims. Pertwee starred in the comedy There's a Girl in My Soup at the Globe Theatre from October 1966, and later appeared in the play's 1967 Broadway production. He was offered the role of Captain Mainwaring in the pilot episode of Dad's Army, but turned it down to continue on Broadway. He appeared in the 1967 The Avengers episode "From Venus with Love".

=== 1969–1974: Doctor Who ===
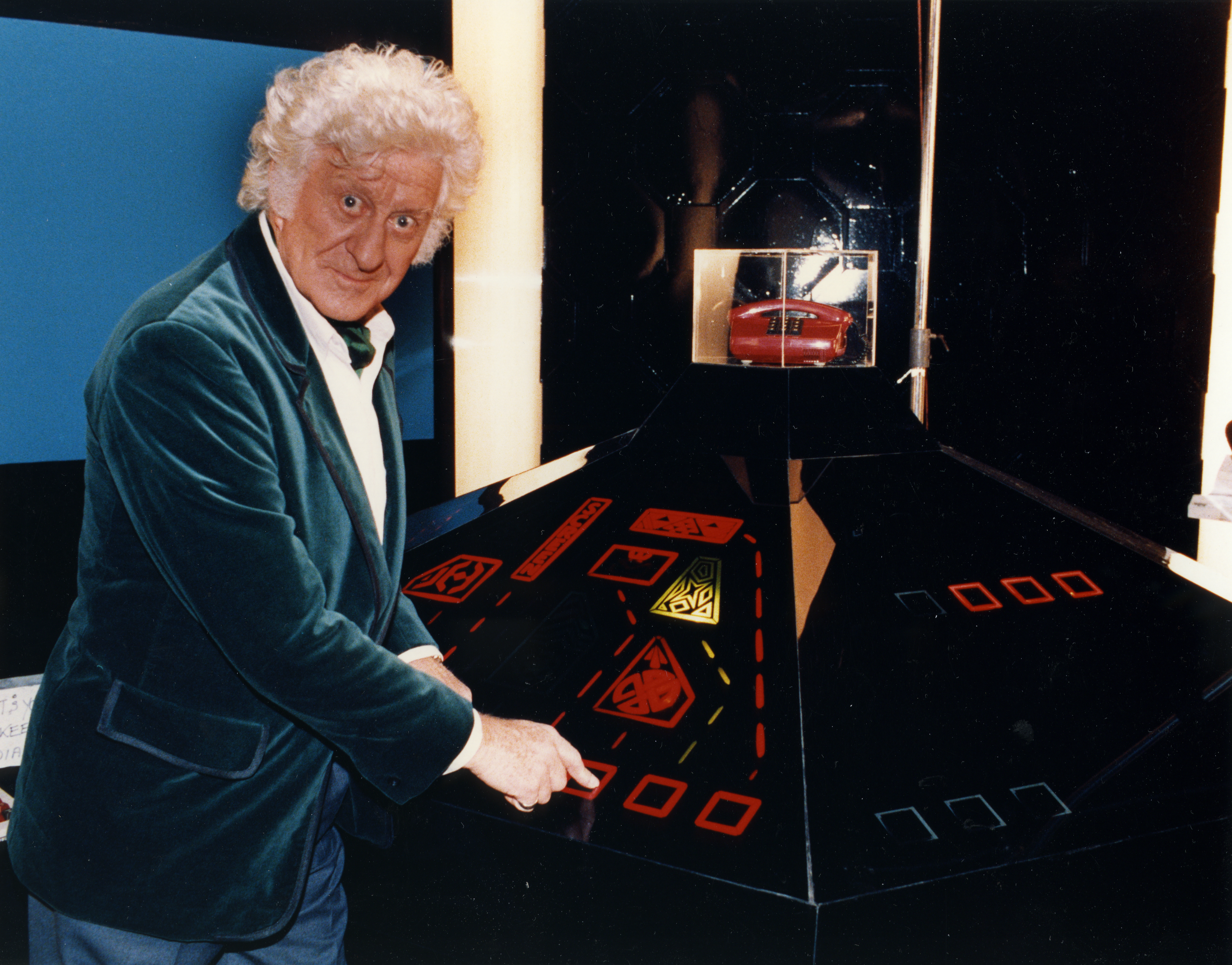
Pertwee in 1985 making a promotional appearance as the Third Doctor

The lead character of the Doctor in the BBC science fiction series Doctor Who had been played first by William Hartnell, and then by Patrick Troughton since 1966. With Troughton leaving the series in 1969, Pertwee's Navy Lark co-star Tenniel Evans suggested that he should apply for the role. Pertwee contacted his agent and was surprised to find he was already on the production team's shortlist. He was the second choice for the role after Ron Moody turned down the part. Pertwee was publicly announced as the Third Doctor via a press photo call on 17 June 1969.

Pertwee's first season saw Doctor Who produced in colour for the first time and a focus on Earth-bound stories rather than space adventures, with the Doctor exiled to Earth by the Time Lords and allied to the military organisation UNIT. The series became influenced by the espionage series The Avengers, the James Bond films, and Nigel Kneale's Quatermass serials, particularly Quatermass and the Pit. The Third Doctor was more of an action hero than his predecessors, as Pertwee brought his love of gadgets and fast vehicles to the series, performing various stunts including riding motorbikes, hovercraft and boats. The Doctor's yellow roadster, Bessie, was introduced in 1970, and the character's winged Whomobile car was commissioned by Pertwee himself from car designer Peter Farries and later introduced into the series. A flamboyant dresser, he wore frilly shirts, velvet jackets and silk-lined cloaks. In comparison to the more private Troughton, Pertwee was a showman who enjoyed promoting himself and the series, which increased Doctor Who's public profile and merchandise sales. Previously falling viewing figures rose to 11 million.

The "straight" leading man role was a departure for Pertwee. When departing Doctor Who producer Peter Bryant cast Pertwee, he expected him to bring his comedy skills to the role, but the BBC's head of drama, Shaun Sutton, advised him to play the Doctor "as himself". Pertwee credited the performance with helping him find his true identity beyond his usual comedic impressions and voices. (Note: In the 1972 non-fiction book The Making of Doctor Who, Pertwee said "Doctor Who is me – or I am Doctor Who. I play him straight from me." In 1989, he stated "I'm an actor playing Dr Who. I'm often asked questions about what the Doctor thinks and I say: 'How the hell do I know?' I'm speaking somebody else's lines.'") As he struggled with technobabble dialogue, Pertwee and script editor Terrance Dicks often re-used the manageable phrase "reverse the polarity" in various scientific scenes throughout the series; it became the Doctor's catchphrase.

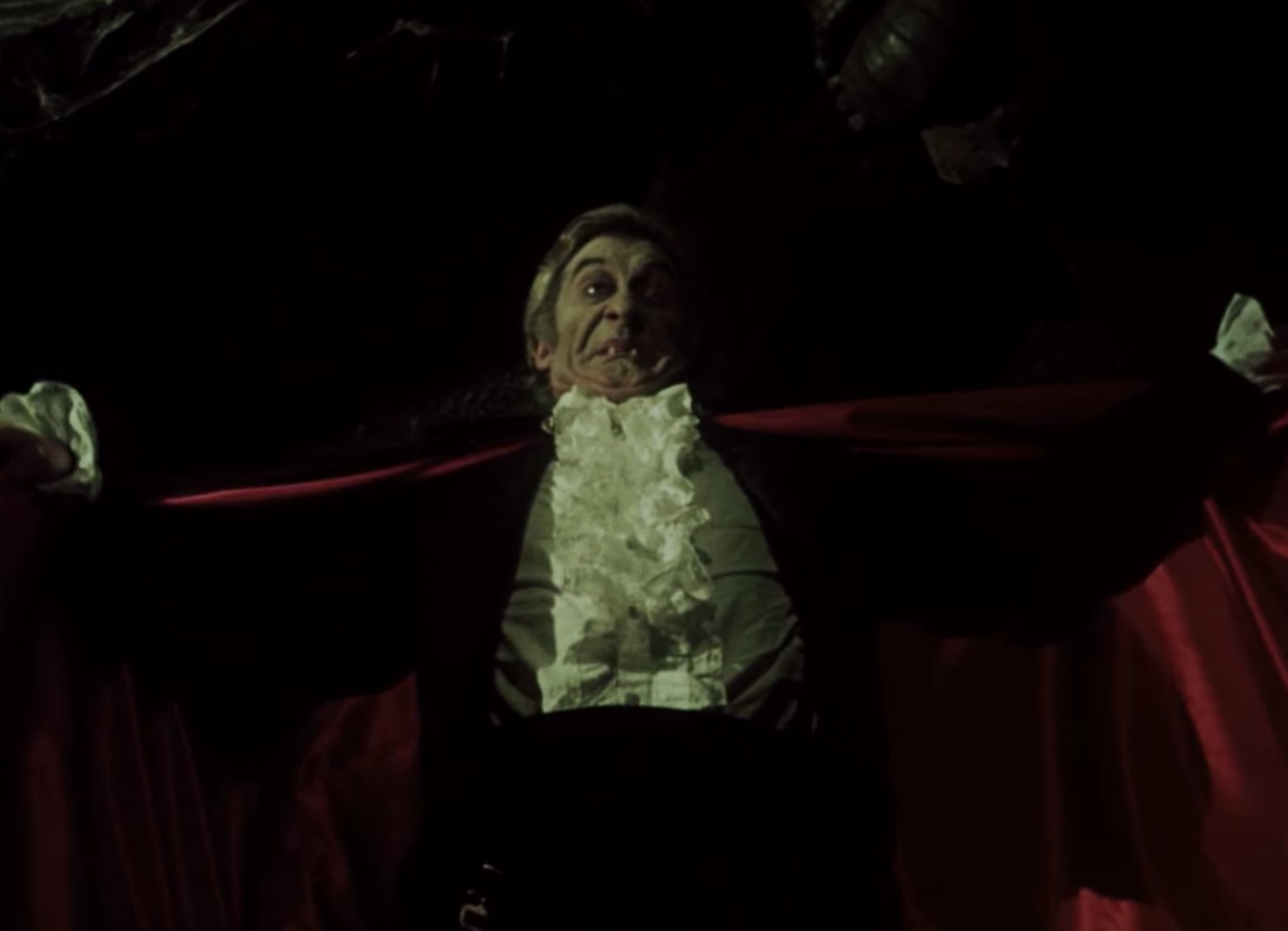
Pertwee in The House That Dripped Blood (1971)

Pertwee co-starred in the Amicus horror anthology The House That Dripped Blood (1971), filmed in the summer of 1970 between his first and second Doctor Who seasons. He played Paul Henderson in the last segment of the film, an arrogant horror film star who meets his doom thanks to a genuine vampire cloak. Pertwee was the subject of an episode of Thames Television's This Is Your Life, broadcast 14 April 1971. "Who is the Doctor", a cover of the Doctor Who theme music featuring vocals by Pertwee, was released in November 1972. He promoted Doctor Who on the children's programme Blue Peter (broadcast 5 November 1973), entering the studio driving the Whomobile.

Pertwee played the Doctor for five seasons, a longer stint than either of his predecessors, although he appeared in fewer episodes than Hartnell as the series's production schedule had been reduced. His good friend Roger Delgado, who portrayed the Doctor's archenemy the Master, died in a car accident in June 1973, which Pertwee stated "tainted everything". His co-star Katy Manning left the series in 1973, and Dicks and producer Barry Letts were both preparing to leave the following year. Pertwee was also suffering from chronic back pain. When his request for a increased fee for a sixth season of Doctor Who was rejected by Shaun Sutton, he decided to leave the series. Planet of the Spiders (1974), the fifth and final serial of season 11, concluded with the Third Doctor's regeneration into the Fourth Doctor, played by Tom Baker.

=== 1974–1979: Return to theatre and film ===
Only a fortnight after the broadcast of Planet of the Spiders, Pertwee began hosting the Thames Television murder-mystery game show Whodunnit?. Having appeared as a guest panelist in the first season, he was asked to take over as host from Edward Woodward, and remained in the role for five seasons, until 1978. He also resumed his stage career, appearing in The Bedwinner at the Royalty Theatre from September 1974. In 1975, he guest-starred in The Goodies as Reverend Llewellyn Llewellyn Llewellyn Llewellyn, a caricature of a Welsh priest, and appeared in the Disney comedy film One of Our Dinosaurs Is Missing.

Pertwee appeared in a 1976 television advertisement that promoted the Green Cross Code by use of the infamously complicated acronym "SPLINK". The same year, Pertwee starred with Julie Anthony in a West End production of the musical Irene at the Adelphi Theatre. He features on the cast recording album published by EMI Records. In summer 1976, Pertwee and actor Walter Randall opened Pertwee's Take Away, a restaurant serving hamburgers in Acton, London. It closed after five years. Pertwee appeared in the sex comedy film Adventures of a Private Eye (1977), and voiced characters in the animated films Wombling Free (1977) and The Water Babies (1978).

=== 1979–1989: Worzel Gummidge ===
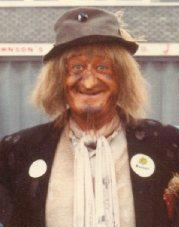
Pertwee as Worzel Gummidge in 1982

During his tenure on Doctor Who, Pertwee was approached to play Worzel Gummidge, the titular anthropomorphic scarecrow of the children's books by Barbara Euphan Todd, in a film by writers Keith Waterhouse and Willis Hall. When this project fell through, Pertwee encouraged the writers to create a television pilot instead. Pertwee pitched the series to the BBC and then Thames Television, which both turned it down. Pertwee "began to lose faith in the project", until ITV franchisee Southern Television agreed to produce the series. From 1979 to 1981, Pertwee starred in four series of Worzel Gummidge, plus a 1980 Christmas special. The success of the series again brought Pertwee to the attention of a large family audience. In March 1980, the single "Worzel’s Song" reached No. 33 in the pop charts.

Alistair McGown, writing for the British Film Institute, stated that the series "produced the best performances of [Pertwee's] career, mixing slapstick and intimate, sentimental scenes". Pertwee felt more empathy with Worzel than with the Doctor. On which role he preferred, Pertwee stated in 1989: "Worzel Gummidge, without question. It is an actor's dream because the man changes his mind and his head with monotonous regularity. So you go through all sorts of phases and characters, which appeals to me enormously."

Pertwee and his co-stars Una Stubbs and Geoffrey Bayldon reprised their roles in Worzel Gummidge The Musical, which opened at Birmingham Rep in late 1980 and played at the Cambridge Theatre in December 1981. Waterhouse and Hall wrote the musical's book and lyrics; its music was written by Denis King. The series ended in 1981 when Southern Television lost its ITV franchise. An album, Worzel Gummidge Sings, was released by Decca in 1982.

Pertwee appeared in the 1982 film The Boys in Blue. He voiced the sidekick character Spotty Man in the children's animated series SuperTed (1983–1986). Pertwee returned to the role of the Doctor in 1983 for the 20th-anniversary television special "The Five Doctors", alongside Troughton and incumbent actor Peter Davison. His voice was featured in the video game Deus Ex Machina (1984) released by Automata UK. He portrayed American painter James McNeill Whistler in a 1984 docudrama for BBC1's Omnibus.

Pertwee campaigned for a continuation of Worzel Gummidge; it was picked up by the New Zealand broadcaster TVNZ in 1987. Two series of Worzel Gummidge Down Under (1987–1989) were produced, which screened in the UK on Channel 4. At the time, Pertwee stated: "It's my baby. I felt tremendous responsibility for it. I'm the one who has nurtured it and kept it going". Pertwee was cast as the lead in the planned science fiction series Starwatch, but it got no further than a low-budget 1989 television pilot. From March to June 1989, he portrayed the Doctor in the stage play Doctor Who – The Ultimate Adventure, which toured theatres in the UK.

=== 1990–1996: Later career ===
Pertwee spoofed his Doctor Who role in the BBC Radio 4 comedy series Harry Hill's Fruit Corner and The Skivers. Pertwee presented the Doctor Who video releases The Troughton Years (1991), showcasing selected surviving episodes of otherwise lost serials, and The Pertwee Years (1992), a look back at his time on the show. From 1991 to 1992 he played Jacob Marley in the stage musical Scrooge. Pertwee appeared in the final Carry On film, Carry On Columbus (1992), as the Duke of Costa Brava. Due to a miscommunication with his wife, he initially assumed he had been offered a part in Ridley Scott's film 1492: Conquest of Paradise (1992), and was disappointed to read the script cover sheet.

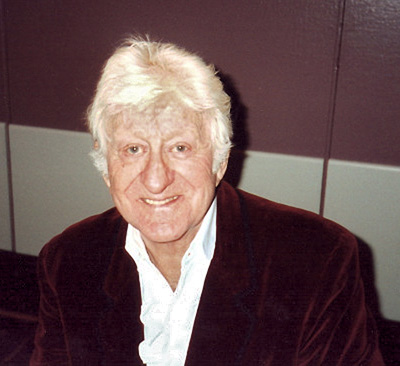
Pertwee at a Doctor Who convention in March 1996, two months before his death.

In his later life, Pertwee made frequent appearances at Doctor Who conventions in the UK and abroad. In his 1996 memoir, he stated that while he enjoyed his association with the series, he had perhaps spent too long in the title role, which led to the "ridiculous situation of people turning me down for parts because, they say, I am too well known as the Doctor." Pertwee observed that after he left the series he only ever worked in a BBC drama on one occasion, as "an ageing Basque arsonist and pornographer" in the 1992 series Virtual Murder (alongside his son Sean Pertwee), which he considered to be one of "the best things I've ever done". In 1993, Pertwee returned to the role of the Doctor—alongside his four successors—in the 30th-anniversary charity special Dimensions in Time for Children in Need. He introduced the special in-character in a live sketch with Noel Edmonds. Pertwee again reprised the role in the five-part radio serial The Paradise of Death (1993), written by Barry Letts and featuring past co-stars Elisabeth Sladen and Nicholas Courtney as Sarah Jane Smith and Brigadier Lethbridge-Stewart respectively. The story was well-received and peaked at 48 in the album charts, leading to a sequel, The Ghosts of N-Space (1996).

Pertwee also played characters inspired by the Doctor in the direct-to-video science fiction films The Airzone Solution (1993) and The Zero Imperative (1994). In April 1995, he recorded a small part as the Third Doctor in Devious, a Doctor Who fan film set after The War Games (1969) and before Spearhead from Space. The film depicts Troughton's Second Doctor regenerating halfway, into an interim Doctor played by Tony Garner, who then regenerates into the Third Doctor. Pertwee's scenes were included on the 2009 DVD release of The War Games.

Beginning in 1995, Pertwee toured the United Kingdom with a one-man show, Who Is Jon Pertwee?, which looked back at his career. The same year, he appeared as Worzel Gummidge in Simply the Best CITV, a television special celebrating 40 years of ITV children's programming. He was among the voice cast of the 1995 video game Discworld, based on Terry Pratchett's novels. Pertwee played General Von Kramer in The Young Indiana Jones Chronicles episode "Attack of the Hawkmen" (1995). In March 1996, Pertwee was a guest presenter on the Channel 4 magazine programme Food File. He made a cameo appearance in a 1996 Vodafone television commercial which referenced his Doctor Who role. His final British television appearance was on Surprise, Surprise, hosted by Cilla Black and broadcast on 21 April 1996, in which he surprised a young fan while appearing in character as the Doctor.

== Personal life ==
Pertwee was a prominent member of the Grand Order of Water Rats, an entertainment industry fraternity and charity based in London. He wrote two autobiographies: Moon Boots and Dinner Suits (1984), which primarily covers his life and career prior to Doctor Who, and the posthumously-published I Am the Doctor (1996), co-written with David J. Howe, which covers his life during and after the series.

=== Family ===
Pertwee met the actress and writer Jean Marsh (1934–2025) while working on the film Will Any Gentleman...? (1953). They married on 2 April 1955, though the marriage quickly broke down. They formally divorced in August 1960. On 13 August 1960, Pertwee married Ingeborg Rhoesa (1935–2026), a German secretary and model he had met in Austria after breaking his leg in a skiing accident. The couple had two children, both actors: a daughter, Dariel (born 1961), and a son, Sean (born 1964).

=== Death ===
In 1996, Pertwee took a break from his British one man tour and went on holiday to Timber Lake in Sherman, Connecticut, United States, with his wife and friends. He died in his sleep from a heart attack on 20 May, at the age of 76. He was due to resume his tour on 23 May. His body was cremated at Putney Vale Cemetery and Crematorium, with a Worzel Gummidge effigy affixed to the coffin, following the instructions in his will.

== Legacy ==
Pertwee pictured in the Radio Times, 1949

Upon Pertwee's death, his Doctor Who successor Tom Baker paid tribute to him as a "stylish actor", and Colin Baker described him as "a man of such presence and stature" while lauding his "straight" interpretation of the Doctor. Other tributes came from actor Ronnie Barker and broadcasters David Jacobs and Terry Wogan. Pertwee's death came eight days after the Edmonton premiere of the Doctor Who television film on 12 May. The BBC's broadcast on 27 May ended with a dedication: "To the memory of Jon Pertwee, 1919-1996, now with the Time Lords".

Jon Pertwee: The Biography by Bernard Bale was published in 2000 by André Deutsch; it included a few chapters by Pertwee's widow.

Audio of Pertwee recorded for Devious was used in Big Finish Productions' 40th anniversary Doctor Who audio drama Zagreus (2003). Archival footage of Pertwee as the Doctor has been used in the revived series of Doctor Who.

In 2016, Pertwee was honoured with a blue plaque at the New Wimbledon Theatre, which was arranged by the Doctor Who Appreciation Society. Pertwee was the society's first Honorary President.

== Bibliography ==
- Pertwee, Jon; Evans, George; Stout, Tim; Welby, Philip; Campton, David; Weiner, Guy; Gleason, Catherine; Chandler, Glenn; Malisson, Roger; Halkin, John (1978). Richard Davis (ed.). The Jon Pertwee Book of Monsters. Methuen Publishing. ISBN 0-416-87190-9.
- Pertwee, Jon (1984). Moon Boots and Dinner Suits. Elm Tree Books. ISBN 0-241-11337-7.
- Pertwee, Jon; Howe, David J. (1996). I Am The Doctor: Jon Pertwee's Final Memoir. Virgin Books. ISBN 1-85227-621-5.
