= Ursula Graham Bower =

British anthropologist

Ursula G. Bower MBE
- Born: Ursula Violet Graham Bower; 15 May 1914; England
- Died: 12 November 1988 (aged 74)
- Education: Roedean School
- Occupation: Anthropologist among the Nagas of the Naga Hills
- Known for: Leader of "Bower Force", Naga guerillas fighting Japanese armies that invaded Burma
- Works: Monographs on the Nagas and the Apatani
- Spouse: Frederick Nicholson Betts
- Parent: stepmother Barbara Euphan Todd

Ursula Violet Graham Bower MBE (later known as U. V. G. Betts) (15 May 1914 – 12 November 1988), was one of the pioneer anthropologists in the Naga Hills between 1937 and 1946 and a guerrilla fighter against the Japanese in Burma from 1942 to 1945.

== Early life and family ==
Born in 1914 in England, the daughter of Commander John Graham Bower, RN (1886–1940), Ursula Bower was educated at Roedean School; a shortage of family funds prevented her from finishing her school education and achieving her goal of reading archaeology at Oxford. On her father's remarriage in 1932, Bower became the stepdaughter of children's writer Barbara Euphan Todd, the creator of the fictional scarecrow Worzel Gummidge. In the same year she travelled to Canada.

== Early travels ==
She first visited India and, more specifically, the Naga Hills and Manipur, in 1937, at the invitation of Alexa Macdonald, whom she had met while on holiday on Skye, and who was staying with her brother who worked in the Indian Civil Service in Imphal. It was a trip where her mother had hoped she would meet a nice husband. Instead, she fell in love with the Naga Hills and their tribes. Bower returned alone to India in 1939 "to potter about with a few cameras and do a bit of medical work, maybe write a book". She spent some years as an anthropologist among the Nagas of the Naga Hills. She took more than a thousand photographs documenting the lives of local tribes which were later used in a comparative study.

== World War II ==
At the start of World War II she was in London, but planning to return to the Naga Hills. When the opportunity arose, she gained permission from the British administration to live among the Naga people in Laisong village, in what was then known as North Cachar. Here she won the friendship and confidence of the local village headmen, so that when the Japanese armies invaded Burma in 1942 and threatened to move on into India, the British administration asked her to form her local Nagas into a band of scouts to comb the jungle for the Japanese. Bower mobilised the Nagas against the Japanese forces, placing herself at their head, initially leading 150 Nagas armed only with ancient muzzle-loading guns across some 800 square miles (2,100 km^{2}) of mountainous jungle. General Slim recognised the work she was doing and supported her with arms and reinforcements, giving her her own unit within V Force, nicknamed "Bower Force". Bower's force of Nagas became so effective that the Japanese put a price on her head. She was the subject of an American comic book entitled Jungle Queen. Her personal weapon of choice was the Sten gun, two of which she wore out in action. Trained as a child by her father to shoot, she had no qualms about handling firearms and training her Naga scouts in their use.

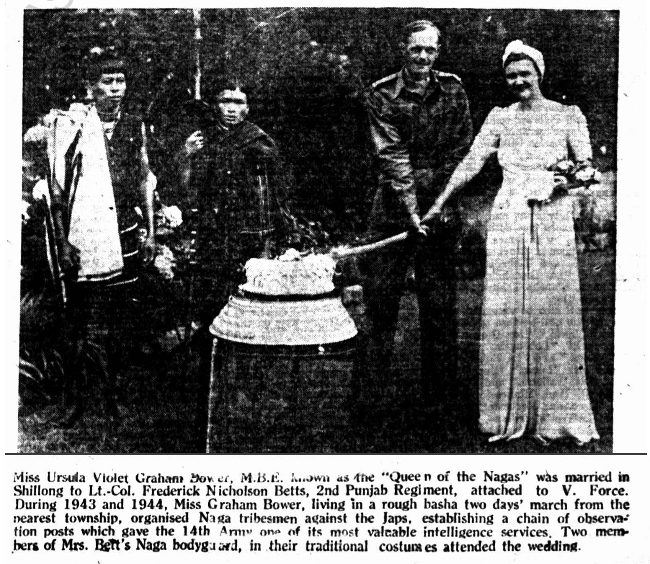
Wedding photograph from The Bombay Chronicle, 9 September 1945

By her orders guards were posted on main and secondary trails, and a watch-and-warn system was established. Over these trails thousands of evacuees, deserters, escaped prisoners and bailed-out airmen fled from Burma to India. Bower also directed Naga ambushes of Japanese search parties. On 24 April 1945 she was appointed Member of the Order of the British Empire for her actions in Burma, and in 1944 she received the Lawrence Memorial Medal of the Royal Society for Asian Affairs, named after Lawrence of Arabia, for her anthropological work among the Nagas.

== Post-War ==
Bower's extensive photographs, film and two monographs on the Nagas and the Apatani established her as a leading anthropologist, alongside her friends J.P. Mills, Bill Archer and Christoph von Furer-Haimendorf. In 1950, she received a postgraduate diploma in anthropology from the University of London.

== Personal life ==
She met Lt. Col Frederick Nicholson Betts when he was serving in V Force in Burma during World War II and married him in July 1945. Betts, known as Tim, was appointed Political Officer in the remote and volatile Subansiri region towards Tibet, and they worked together to establish good relations and pacify the constantly battling Dafla and Apa Tani tribes, until Indian Independence demanded their removal. After returning with her husband to Britain in 1948, they grew coffee in British Kenya. Leaving Kenya because of the danger of local unrest, they relocated to the Isle of Mull, where they brought up their two daughters, one of whom is Alison Betts. After her marriage she was known as U. V. G. Betts. Her papers are held by the Centre of South Asian Studies at the University of Cambridge.

== Works based on her life ==
Two BBC Radio 4 programmes, The Naga Queen, produced by Chris Eldon Lee and narrated by John Horsley Denton, and The Butterfly Hunt, a play by Matthew Solon were based on the life of Ursula Betts and her husband F. N. Betts.

A documentary film entitled Captured by Women (2011) featuring some of Ursula Graham Bower's photograph and object collections in connection with her own film footage of her time in Nagaland, was produced by The Oxford Academy of Documentary Film (OADF), with funding from the British Film Council (The National Digital Archive Fund – Screen South). This was a collaborative project between OADF and the Pitt Rivers Museum, University of Oxford. The documentary includes the film footage and work of Beatrice Blackwood, another important anthropologist who collected photographs and objects from Papua New Guinea (among other places), and who also captured film footage of her time in the field in the 1930s.

== Other sources ==
- Ursula Graham Bower. 1950. Naga Path London, John Murray.
- Ursula Graham Bower. 1950. Drums Behind The Hill, New York, Morrow.
- Ursula Graham Bower. 1953. The Hidden Land London, John Murray.
- Vicky Thomas, official biographer. 2012 'The Naga Queen', The History Press
