= Worzel Gummidge =

Fictional character

- Worzel Gummidge character
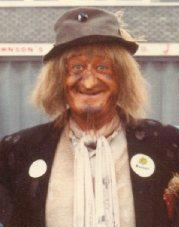
- Jon Pertwee as Worzel Gummidge in 1982
- First appearance: The Children's Hour (1935)
- Last appearance: Worzel Gummidge: Caliope Jane (2021)
- Created by: Barbara Euphan Todd
- Portrayed by: Philip Wade; Dennis Folwell; Frank Atkinson; Jon Pertwee; Mackenzie Crook

In-universe information
- Species: Scarecrow
- Gender: Male
- Family: Earthy Mangold, Chloe Raggett, Pickles Bramble

Worzel Gummidge is a fictional scarecrow who first appeared on BBC Radio in The Children's Hour on Tuesday 10 December 1935, before continuing in a series of books by the English novelist Barbara Euphan Todd. The first book was the first to be published by Puffin Books.

The books have been adapted for radio and television a number of times. The original radio cast listing did not specify who performed which part, but Frank Atkinson was the first person to play the role on television in the 1953 BBC children's television series Worzel Gummidge Turns Detective. Former Doctor Who actor Jon Pertwee took the lead role from 1979 to 1981 in Worzel Gummidge, produced by Southern Television for ITV in the UK. Pertwee reprised the role later in a New Zealand version (1987–1989). In the Southern Television series, the character had a set of interchangeable turnip, mangelwurzel and swede heads, each of which suited a particular occasion or endowed him with a specific skill.

In 2019 the character returned to the screen in the BBC series Worzel Gummidge, starring Mackenzie Crook in the title role.

== Outline ==
Worzel Gummidge is a scarecrow that can come to life on Scatterbrook Farm. He stands in a ten-acre field, and befriends John and Susan, who came to stay during the school holidays on the Braithwaites' farm. Worzel normally lands John and Susan in trouble when he is being mischievous, as he goes into a sulk and becomes a normal lifeless scarecrow. This leads others to blame the two children for the trouble he causes.

== Books ==
The Worzel Gummidge books differ from the television adaptions, one difference being that in the books Worzel is married to Earthy Mangold. In the first book, Aunt Sally (his femme fatale in the TV series) is only mentioned in one chapter and the character is an antagonistic bully to Worzel. For the television adaptation, Worzel has a collection of interchangeable heads. In the books, the maker of Worzel Gummidge and other scarecrows is not named the Crowman, but is described as a mysterious figure.

The first paperback version of the first book, released in 1941, has the distinction of being the first story book published by the famous children's imprint Puffin. Altogether 10 books in the series were published:

- Worzel Gummidge, or The Scarecrow of Scatterbrook (1936)
- Worzel Gummidge Again (1937)
- More About Worzel Gummidge (1938)
- Worzel Gummidge and Saucy Nancy (1947)
- Worzel Gummudge Takes A Holiday (1949)
- Earthy Mangold and Worzel Gummidge (1954)
- Worzel Gummidge and the Railway Scarecrows (1955)
- Worzel Gummidge At The Circus (1956)
- Worzel Gummidge and the Treasure Ship (1958)
- Detective Worzel Gummidge (1963)

== Adaptations ==
=== Children's Hour ===
The first broadcast with Worzel was before World War II on the BBC's Children's Hour. By 1946, Worzel was played by veteran radio actor Philip Wade, John by John Clark, Susan by Rosamund Barnes, and Earthy Mangold by Mabel Constanduros. Later, Worzel was played by Denis Folwell, who went on to play Jack Archer in the long-running BBC Radio soap opera The Archers.

=== Worzel Gummidge Turns Detective ===
The character first appeared on television in 1953 in a four-part series starring Frank Atkinson in the title role.

=== Jackanory ===
In July 1967 five Worzel Gummidge stories were read on Jackanory by Gordon Rollings. Worzel Gummidge Again was read in November 1974 (with one story tying in with Guy Fawkes Night) by Geoffrey Bayldon, who later appeared in the 1979-81 TV series.

=== 1979-81 television series ===
Southern Television's production for ITV was written by Keith Waterhouse and Willis Hall, and starred Jon Pertwee as Worzel, with Una Stubbs as Aunt Sally, a life-size fairground doll and Worzel's femme fatale. This was a significant change from the original books, where Aunt Sally is, in fact, Worzel's aunt. The Crowman, who made Worzel and some of his other scarecrow friends, was played by Geoffrey Bayldon (who read Worzel Gummidge Again in November 1974 on BBC1's Jackanory), better known for his starring role as the title character of Catweazle. Bill Maynard also appeared as a scarecrow called Sergeant Beetroot.

=== Worzel Gummidge Down Under ===
Television New Zealand and Channel 4 collaborated on a follow-up programme that ran for two series in 1987 and 1989, with Worzel Gummidge and Aunt Sally, still played by Pertwee and Stubbs, relocated to New Zealand.

=== Worzel Gummidge (2019 adaptation) ===
A new adaptation of Worzel Gummidge was broadcast by the BBC from 2019, starring Mackenzie Crook, who also wrote and directed the series. A total of six episodes were recorded across two series. Other cast members included Rosie Cavaliero and Steve Pemberton as Reenie and Henry Braithwaite, Francesca Mills as Earthy Mangold, Tim Plester as Clarty, and Vicki Pepperdine as Aunt Sally.
