= Frederick Betts =

Fred or Frederick Betts may refer to:

- Frederick Cronyn Betts (1896–1938), Canadian politician and solicitor
- Frederick E. Betts (1870–1942), Canadian ice hockey administrator and businessman
- Frederick Nicholson Betts (1906–1973), British Indian Army officer and ornithologist
