= Jordan Gray =

English comedian and singer (born 1989)

- Born: Jordan Redford Gray; 11 January 1989 (age 37); Thurrock, Essex, England
- Occupations: Comedian, actress, singer
- Years active: 2006–present
- Spouse: Heli Siva-Gray

Jordan Redford Gossamer Gray (born 11 January 1989) is an English comedian and singer from Essex.

After beginning her career as a singer, she released several independent singles and albums. She appeared on the fifth series of The Voice UK, where she was a semi-finalist; having performed a skit during one of the live shows and preferred it to singing, and after a record label deal was not renewed, she became a comedian, where she was nominated for an Edinburgh Comedy Award for her tour Is It a Bird? in 2022. Her 2022 appearance on Friday Night Live, where she performed a song about her experiences as a transgender woman, stripped naked, and played the piano with her penis, attracted praise and controversy.

== Early life ==
Gray was born Jordan Redford Gray in Thurrock on 11 January 1989, and attended Hassenbrook Academy in Corringham before spending two years at Palmer's College. Her father was a director of a steel factory who also performed as an Elvis impersonator, while her mother worked as a hairdresser, a bouncer and a pub landlady. Gray realised she was transgender while chopping wood in Sweden, having moved there after becoming engaged to a Swedish woman, and came out while accepting a trophy for best original artist at the Essex Entertainment awards while dressed as a cat. She told Unicorn Zine that her second middle name, Gossamer (an alternative name for spider silk), was added due to the United Kingdom not having a process to change honorific from Mr to Miss; she had considered changing it to Olivia before realising that Jordan was gender neutral and deciding it was not worth wasting her money. At the time of her appearance on The Voice UK, she was living in Musselburgh, Scotland.

== Career ==
=== 2005–2015: Musician and author ===
Initially, Gray was a singer; her first gigs were at her mother's pub, the Orsett Cock, as lead singer of death metal band Silent Feedback. Her first music was written on a cheap Toys R Us keyboard, before a well-wisher bought her a slightly more expensive keyboard after she fell ill in 2005; in October 2005, she was diagnosed with persisting perception disorder, which she wrote a 2011 book about called Beautiful Lights: Living with Hallucinations. Her father later bought her a Yamaha Tyros2, and her first album, Beautiful, was released in early 2007 under the name Tall Dark Friend, a play on the expression "you will meet a tall dark stranger". Two more albums followed, The Anti-hero and The Dark Horse and the Underdog, in 2007 and 2008; the latter was launched at the 29 November 2008 at an edition of her show Concerto Diabolus, which was choreographed by Anne-Marie Nicholson and Emma Stade and featured guest spots from acoustic guitarist Ben Sullivan and saxophonist James Ansell. A self-titled EP followed in 2009. She released two singles, "This is Pop" and "Corridors", both of which had music videos, and the latter of which was filmed in the Bata shoe factory, and then two albums, Pop Psychology and See My Bones in 2012, the former of which contained a reworked version of "Corridors". She performed "Corridors" on Britain's Got Talent and progressed to the next round, but ultimately did not progress further. She also appeared on Sing Date around the same time.

She took a year out in Scandinavia for most of 2014, at which point she was midway through a residency at Las Iguanas in Lakeside; that year, she released the novel Dog Bless the Day, which the blurb describes as "one starving cat's chance encounter with a layabout lizard and silver-tongued macaw [which] sets in motion a chain of insupposable events", and in 2015, she released the novel Snap, about a student who needs to master a camera to administer justice. Both of these featured illustrations by Rhys Lowry. On 31 October 2014, she released "More Than Mates (You & Me)", and in 2015 she released the album The Baffled King and won Best Music Video for "Hang With the Happiness" at the 2015 Thurrock International Film Festival.

=== 2016–2017: The Voice UK and record label signing ===
Gray appeared on the fifth series of The Voice UK in 2016, in so doing becoming its first transgender contestant; she joined Paloma Faith's team, after JJ Soulx withdrew for personal reasons, and ultimately reached the semi-finals. At the time of her performance, she had been gigging around Essex and London for ten years, and told Guyslikeu.com that she went into schools to talk about gender as part Educate & Celebrate, a charity which provides LGBT+ inclusion training in schools, although they denied that she had ever done so when they removed her as patron in October 2022. She then signed to The Record Label and released a single, "Platinum", which charted at number 114 on the UK Singles Chart; she told Gay Star News that its music video, which featured pornographic actor Mickey Taylor, contained "the first cis male–trans female love scene in a mainstream release". After she was dropped, she spent two months working as a cleaner in a casino.

Performed	Song	Original Artist	Result
Blind Audition	"Just Like a Woman"	Bob Dylan	Joined Team Paloma as a wildcard
Battle Rounds	"This Woman's Work" (against Theo Llewellyn)	Kate Bush	Advanced
Knockouts	"Real Gone Kid"	Deacon Blue	Advanced
Quarter-Final	"Shake It Out"	Florence + the Machine	Fast pass
Semi-Final	"Dancing in the Dark"	Bruce Springsteen	Eliminated

=== 2017–present: Comedy ===
She decided to become a comedian after performing a skit between performances on one of the live shows on The Voice UK, and finding it more fun than singing; every three days for three months afterwards, she sat in the front row at Top Secret Comedy Club in London and made notes about structure and storytelling. She announced her change of career on 1 April 2017; she told Educate & Celebrate that "half the [Tall Dark Friend] fans still think this is a big elaborate joke... which is a cosmic irony in and of itself. Also, if I turn out to be rubbish... I'll just say "it was"... ironically making me one of the greatest alternative comedians of all time". The comedian Tom Mayhew saw her announcement, and gave Jordan her first stand-up gig; this was performed at The Bill Murray whilst in a dressing gown and surgical bandages, as she had just had breast implants fitted in a process documented for Transformation Street, a 2018 ITV documentary series about patients at the London Transgender Surgery.

She performed her debut show People Change at the Edinburgh Festival Fringe in 2018 and won the Best New Comedian award at the Panic Awards in 2019. In 2018, she appeared in the video for Paloma Faith's promotional single "Warrior". From May 2017 she presented The ExtraJordanary Show for Phoenix FM; its fifty-ninth episode aired in April 2019. She wrote and starred in a pilot for a sitcom, titled Tall Dark Friend, which led to the commissioning of Transaction.

Using the money from ITV's commission of Transaction, she took her 2022 tour Is It a Bird? to the Edinburgh Festival Fringe with the production company Stamptown. She was nominated for an Edinburgh Comedy Award for Is It a Bird? in August 2022, and won the 2022 Comedians' Choice Award. In October 2022, she launched a podcast, Transplaining, and later that month, she became the first transgender person to headline the London Palladium.

=== 2020-present: Television ===
In 2020, she appeared in Transaction, a six-part series of five-minute shorts for Comedy Central starring Gray as Liv, a narcissistic transgender supermarket worker. She told Gay Star News she wrote it as an attempt to write "a regular tit-for-brains, not some tragic hero", on the grounds that she "was getting bored of seeing [transgender women] represented as either poor suffering saints or hypersexualised villains". She told The List in August 2022 that ITV had ordered a series of full length episodes, which, if it was made, would be the first British television sitcom to feature a transgender lead actor since Boy Meets Girl, which ended in 2016. The same article stated that BBC Radio 4 had ordered a comedy series, Spectacular, which was loosely based on her appearance on The Voice UK and on HBO's The Comeback, where she "play[ed her]self without self-awareness, [as] if comedy hadn't come along and I'd clung to the idea that I could make a living from music off the back of a reality TV appearance". In July 2021, she appeared in BBC Radio 4's Taboo, an exploration of what was and wasn't acceptable in comedy and in January 2022 she appeared as "Future Archaeologist" on the first episode of the second series of Spencer Jones's sitcom, The Mind of Herbert Clunkerdunk.

She appeared on Friday Night Live in October 2022, performing "Better Than You" from Is It a Bird?, a song about her experiences as a transgender woman; she attracted attention after she ripped off her jumpsuit, revealing her naked body, and began playing the piano with her penis. Her original plan, before health and safety intervened, had been even more dramatic; she told The Independent the following month that she wanted to reveal herself by setting alight a suit made of magician's cotton. While some praised her for highlighting the existence of transgender people and others hailed it the "TV moment of the year", Brendan O'Neill complained of double standards following the perceived cancellation of Jerry Sadowitz for indecent exposure, with Ofcom receiving 1,538 complaints over the performance and Educate and Celebrate removing her as patron. After Ofcom dismissed its complaints, Gray told The Independent that she performed her "four-minute musical edition of Naked Attraction" because she "thought it might be nice for trans people around the country to see their body represented onscreen, outside of all the porn the world pretends it isn't watching", that "for every death threat in my inbox, there are five letters from grateful parents telling me their trans kid no longer wants to kill themself" and that those calling her a "talentless hack" should "read the room". The death threats she received to prompted the London Palladium to hire extra security guards for her performance a week later.

In November 2022, she appeared on The Now Show and The Russell Howard Hour. In December 2022, she performed on Joe Lycett's Got Your Back. In March 2023, she appeared on Alan Davies: As Yet Untitled, and in June 2023, she appeared on Guessable. In February 2024, she appeared on QI, and in May 2024, she appeared on Late Night Lycett. Filming took place in late 2024 in Hartlepool for her ITV sitcom Transaction.

== Personal life ==
Gray is married to Heli Siva-Gray, a croupier from the Czech Republic, whom she met online in 2015, and who emigrated specifically for her. Gray identifies as a lesbian. She said in 2016 that she would be unlikely to undergo gender reassignment surgery, on the grounds that she could not see it affecting her life. She has variously claimed to be completely blind in her left eye and to have poor eyesight in it.

== Filmography ==
Year	Title	Role	Notes
2016	The Voice UK	Contestant	Semi-finalist
2019	Tall Dark Friend	Jordan	Writer and actor
2020	Transaction	Liv	Writer and actor
2022	Friday Night Live	Self	
2022	The Russell Howard Hour	Self	
2022	Joe Lycett's Got Your Back	Self	
