= Francesca Mills =

English actress

- Born: Francesca Mills; 1996 or 1997 (age 29–30); Loggerheads, Staffordshire, England
- Education: Madeley High School; Urdang Academy; Jill Clewes Academy for Theatre Arts
- Occupation: Actress
- Years active: 2014–present

Francesca Mills (born 1996 or 1997) is an English actress, known for playing Cherry Dorrington in the television series Harlots (2019–2020), Earthy Mangold in Worzel Gummidge (2021) and Meldof in The Witcher: Blood Origin (2022) released by Netflix.

Mills has most recently starred as Millie in ITV comedy series Transaction (2025) and as crime and forensic analyst Kit Brookes in the BBC crime drama Silent Witness.

== Early life ==
Mills was born with the genetic disorder achondroplasia, a common form of dwarfism.

As of 2021, Mills lives in London, but was brought up in Loggerheads, Staffordshire. Mills learned to dance at the Jill Clewes Dance School in Bradwell, Staffordshire, and first acted in a production of Oliver! at the age of nine. Mills was a student at Madeley High School in Madeley, Staffordshire. She also travelled to London to attend the Urdang Academy in Islington, and was a student at the Academy of Theatre Arts in Worcester.

== Career ==
In 2014, Mills joined Warwick Davis's Reduced Height Theatre Company for its first production, a revival of See How They Run, at the Richmond Theatre. In 2017, Mills was nominated for the Ian Charleson Awards for her performance as Maria in The Government Inspector at the Birmingham Repertory Theatre. The same year, Mills played a seamstress in the Timothy Sheader directed production of A Tale of Two Cities at the Regent's Park Open Air Theatre. In 2019, Mills played multiple roles in The American Clock at The Old Vic in 2019. The same year, Mills was in a national tour production of the Emma Rice version of the Malory Towers musical. From 2018 to 2019, Mills starred as Cherry Dorrington in series 2 and 3 of Harlots with co-stars Eloise Smyth and Samantha Morton, and as Earthy Mangold in Worzel Gummidge alongside Mackenzie Crook.

In August 2021, Mills began filming the Netflix miniseries The Witcher: Blood Origin, set in a time 1,200 years before The Witcher. Mills appears as Meldof, an assassin, in a cast which includes Lenny Henry and Michelle Yeoh. The miniseries aired on Netflix on 25 December 2022.

In 2024, Mills voiced Bethany in series four of the audio play Doctor Who: The Ninth Doctor Adventures.

In January 2025, Mills made her first appearance in episode 2 of series 28 on the BBC TV forensic crime series Silent Witness as Kit Brookes, a crime analyst.

In June 2025, Mills starred as 'Millie' in ITV comedy series Transaction, written by and co-starring Jordan Gray.

== Filmography ==
=== Film ===
Year	Title	Role	Notes
2015	Star Wars: Episode VII - The Force Awakens	Laparo	Uncredited role; also creature & droid puppeteer
2016	Zoolander 2	Elfin Huntress	

=== Television ===
Year	Title	Role	Notes
2015	Off Their Rockers	Prankster	2 episodes: "Blue Badge Specials 1 & 2"
2018–2019	Harlots	Cherry Dorrington	Series 2 & 3; 15 episodes
2019–2021	Worzel Gummidge	Earthy Mangold	Series 1 & 2; 6 episodes
2020	Dr. Seuss' How the Grinch Stole Christmas! The Musical	Thing	Television musical film
2020	Jack and the Beanstalk: After Ever After	Butcher	Television film
2022	Pistol	Helen of Troy	Mini-series; 5 episodes
2022	Sneakerhead	Jemma	3 episodes
2022	The Witcher: Blood Origin	Meldof	Mini-series; 4 episodes
2023	BBC Comedy Singles: Kirkmoore	Chloe	Television Special
2023	Boat Story	Belinda	Mini-series; 1 episode
2024	Time Bandits	Detective Katherine	5 episodes
2025-present	Silent Witness	Kit Brookes	Series 28 and 29, 17 episodes
2025	Transaction	Millie	6 episodes
2026	The Baddies †	Mouse (voice)	Upcoming animated short story

=== Theatre ===
Year	Title	Role	Company / Theatre / reference
2014	See How They Run	Ida	The Reduced Height Theatre Company, Richmond Theatre
2016	The Government Inspector	Maria	Ramps on The Moon / Birmingham Repertory Theatre
2016	A Pacifist's Guide to the War on Cancer	Ensemble	Complicité / Royal National Theatre
2017	Cyrano de Bergerac	(unknown)	Northern Broadsides - UK tour
2017	A Tale of Two Cities	Novice / Seamstress	Regent's Park Open Air Theatre
2018	The Two Noble Kinsmen	Jailer's Daughter	Shakespeare's Globe
2018	Pity	(unknown)	Royal Court Theatre
2018	A Midsummer Night's Dream	Snug	Sheffield Crucible
2019	The American Clock	Multiple roles	The Old Vic
2019	Malory Towers	Sally Hope	Wise Children - UK tour
2022	All of Us	Poppy	Royal National Theatre
2023	A Midsummer Night's Dream	Hermia	Shakespeare's Globe
2023	The Duchess of Malfi	Duchess	Sam Wanamaker Playhouse / Shakespeare's Globe
2025	Hamlet	Ophelia	Royal National Theatre

== Awards and nominations ==
Year	Award	Role	Work	Result	Ref.
2016	Ian Charleson Awards	Maria	The Government Inspector at the Birmingham Repertory Theatre	Nominated	
2024	Ian Charleson Awards	Hermia	A Midsummer Night's Dream at Shakespeare's Globe	Won	
