= Alison Betts =

British archaeologist and academic

Alison Betts FSA FAHA
- Born: Scotland
- Title: Professor of Silk Road Studies

Academic background
- Education: Institute of Archaeology, University of London
- Thesis: The prehistory of the basalt desert, Transjordan: an analysis (1986)

Academic work
- Discipline: archaeology and prehistory
- Institutions: University of Edinburgh; Queen's University Belfast; University of Sydney

Alison Venetia Graham Betts FSA FAHA is a Scottish archaeologist and academic, who specialises in the "archaeology of the lands along the Silk Roads" and the nomadic peoples of the Near East. Since 2012, she has been Professor of Silk Road Studies at the University of Sydney.

== Early life and education ==
Betts was born and raised in Scotland. She is the daughter of Ursula Graham Bower, an anthropologist, and Frederick Nicholson Betts, an army officer and ornithologist, and has a sister, Catriona. She studied at the Institute of Archaeology, University of London, graduating with a Bachelor of Arts (BA) degree, a Master of Arts (MA) degree, and a Doctor of Philosophy (PhD) degree. Her doctoral thesis was submitted in 1986 and was titled "The prehistory of the basalt desert, Transjordan: an analysis".

== Academic career ==
In 1986, Betts joined the University of Edinburgh as a British Academy teaching fellow. In 1989, she moved to the Queen's University, Belfast, where she worked as a research fellow. In 1991, she was appointed a lecturer in Levantine archaeology at the University of Sydney. By 2010, she had been promoted to senior lecturer. In 2012, she was appointed Professor of Silk Road Studies.

Betts has excavated in the Near East and in Central Asia, including directing excavations in Eastern Jordan, in Uzbekistan, and in Xinjiang, China. Her research is mainly focused on the Bronze Age, archaeology of the Levant, archaeology of the Silk Roads, and nomadic pastoralism of the Near East.

In August 2016, Betts gave that year's Petrie Oration on "Kingship and the Gods in Ancient Khorezm: new light on the early history of Zoroastrianism"; the Petrie Oration is an "annual public lecture sponsored by the Australian Institute of Archaeology on ancient world archaeology".

== Honours ==
In 2010, Betts was elected a Fellow of the Australian Academy of the Humanities (FAHA), the top learned academy in Australia for the humanities. On 13 October 2016, she was elected a Fellow of the Society of Antiquaries of London (FSA).

== Selected works ==
- Khozhaniyazou, G.; Helms, S.; Betts, A. (2006). The military architecture of ancient Chorasmia. Paris: De Boccard. ISBN 978-2701801964.
- Betts, A. V. G.; Cropper, D.; Martin, L.; McCartney, C. (2013). The Later Prehistory of the Badia: Excavations and Surveys in Eastern Jordan. Oxford: Oxbow Books. ISBN 978-1842174739.
- Betts, A.; Kidd, F., eds. (2015). Buddhist Iconography of Northern Bactria. New Delhi: Manohar Publications. ISBN 978-9350980972.
