= Worzel Gummidge (TV series) =

British children's TV series (1979–1981)

- Created by: Keith Waterhouse; Willis Hall
- Based on: Characters by Barbara Euphan Todd
- Starring: Jon Pertwee; Una Stubbs; Geoffrey Bayldon; Barbara Windsor; Bill Maynard; Lorraine Chase
- Country of origin: United Kingdom
- No. of episodes: 31

Production
- Running time: 25 minutes
- Production company: Southern Television

Original release
- Network: ITV
- Release: 25 February 1979 – 12 December 1981

Related
- Worzel Gummidge Down Under

Worzel Gummidge is a British children's television series, produced by Southern Television for ITV, and based on the Worzel Gummidge books by English author Barbara Euphan Todd. The programme starred Jon Pertwee as the titular scarecrow and Una Stubbs as Aunt Sally. It ran for four series in the UK from 1979 to 1981. On a countdown of the greatest British children's programmes, this series was number 50 in the 50 Greatest Kids TV Shows on Channel 5 on 8 November 2013. Channel 4 reprised the show in 1987 as Worzel Gummidge Down Under, which was set in New Zealand.

== Outline ==
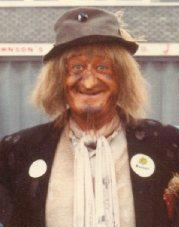
Jon Pertwee as Worzel Gummidge in 1982

In 1978, a television adaptation of Worzel Gummidge was produced by ITV station Southern Television for transmission on the ITV network. It was written by Keith Waterhouse and Willis Hall, and starred former Doctor Who actor Jon Pertwee as Worzel and Una Stubbs as Aunt Sally, a life-size fairground doll and the object of Worzel's affection. This was a significant change from the original books, where Aunt Sally is Worzel's aunt, and Worzel is married to Earthy Mangold, a character who does not appear in the series. The Crowman, who made Worzel and some of his other scarecrow friends, is played by Geoffrey Bayldon, who is better known for playing the title role in the show Catweazle. Regular and occasional guest appearances were made by well-known TV actors of the time, including Barbara Windsor, Billy Connolly, Bill Maynard, Joan Sims, John Le Mesurier, Jimmy Jewel, Lorraine Chase, Bernard Cribbins, Connie Booth, Thorley Walters, Jonathan Cecil, David Lodge, Mike Reid and Beryl Reid.

According to Jon Pertwee's memoirs, the idea for the series began as a proposed film about the Worzel Gummidge character by Waterhouse and Hall which would have been "about the scarecrow equivalent" of the Peasants' Revolt, with the scarecrows rising up against farmers who were going to burn them when the farming season had finished. Pertwee was approached to play the lead character by producer Gareth Wigan. When that project was unable to secure the funds it needed for a distribution deal, Pertwee encouraged the writers to create a television pilot instead, and via his agent pitched the idea to Shaun Sutton, then Head of Drama at the BBC. Sutton turned down the project, which he felt was "too way out", as did Philip Jones at Thames Television. Pertwee later recalled that he "began to lose faith in the project", but Southern Television's Lewis Rudd heard about it and enthusiastically agreed that his company would make the series.

A total of four series with 30 episodes and an extended Christmas special were made between 1979 and 1981. When Southern lost its contract to broadcast on ITV, the new contract-holder, TVS, did not renew the show, despite a press campaign led by the Daily Star. Unsuccessful attempts were made to continue the series: one for it to be produced independently by Southern for the BBC, and another for it to be produced in Ireland, HTV continued with their plans to produce the show in Ireland, but they fell through because of trade union problems, as did attempts by the same company to make further episodes in England. However, the scripts that Waterhouse and Hall had written for the Irish episodes were published in book form. In 1981, Pertwee and Stubbs starred in the musical Worzel Gummidge at the Birmingham Repertory Theatre, which also starred Lucy Benjamin (then Lucy Jane Baker) as Sue. Jon Pertwee's final TV appearance as Worzel was in 1995, to celebrate 40 years of ITV.

"Worzel's Song", sung by Jon Pertwee, was released in 1980; it reached number 33 in the UK charts.

=== Filming locations ===
The main locations for filming were the villages of Stockbridge, King's Somborne and Braishfield, along with Broughton for the fourth series, all of which are near Romsey in Hampshire. The Scatterbrook Farm scenes were filmed at Pucknall in Braishfield. Michelmersh was used for the scenes in the Scatterbrook barn. Worzel's scarecrow stand was filmed near Fishpond's Farm, between Braishfield and King's Somborne at OS grid location SU378274.

=== New Zealand ===
The programme remained in limbo until Channel 4, along with Television New Zealand, commissioned Worzel Gummidge Down Under in 1986, which was shot on location in New Zealand. It ran for two series totalling 22 episodes. Only Pertwee and Stubbs remained from the original cast, with Bruce Phillips joining the cast as the Crowman, after Geoffrey Bayldon declined to reprise the role. Olivia Ihimaera-Smiler, daughter of prominent Māori author Witi Ihimaera, joined as one of the children. The Lord of the Rings director, Peter Jackson, received an early credit for his work providing special effects for the series.

Michael Grade, the newly appointed head of Channel 4, cancelled the series after the New Zealand version drew low audience figures.

== Storyline ==
In the series, Worzel Gummidge was a scarecrow that could come to life. Living in Ten Acre Field, he would often visit the nearby village of Scatterbrook. He befriended two children, brother and sister John and Sue Peters, who often tried to clear up the messes he created. Worzel had a collection of interchangeable turnip, mangelwurzel, and swede heads; each suiting a particular occasion or allowing him to perform a certain task. He also had his own language, Worzelese. Worzel's catchphrases were: "A cup o' tea an' a slice o' cake", "I'll be bum-swizzled" and "Bozzy MCoo". He was madly in love with Aunt Sally, a vain, cruel-hearted fairground coconut-shy doll who considered herself a lady and far too good for a common scarecrow such as Worzel. Aunt Sally often exploits Worzel for her own ends (in one episode, she promises to marry him if he frees her from a junkshop washing machine, but she never has any intention of going through with it). The Crowman says there are good and bad Aunt Sallys (S04E05). The one Worzel likes has delusions of grandeur and is usually dismissive and patronising towards him.

The rationale for the move to New Zealand in Down Under was that Aunt Sally is purchased by a visiting museum curator from New Zealand, and Worzel follows her into the luggage chute.

== Worzelese ==
Worzel and the other scarecrows sometimes spoke in their own "language", which was simply English spelled out letter-by-letter with "wor" appended to each. Words with three letters or less had "dip" appended, while longer words ended with "zel". Children who spoke Worzelese as a language game therefore gained practice with their spelling. However, Worzelese is far harder to speak than other play languages like Pig Latin and never really caught on.

Worzel teaches Worzelese to the children (John & Sue) in series 1 episode 2, called 'A Home Fit For Scarecrows', when they offer to give him an old chair that Mrs. Braithwate is going to throw away.

== British cast ==
Character	Series 1	Series 2	Series 3	Series 4
Worzel Gummidge	Jon Pertwee	Jon Pertwee	Jon Pertwee	Jon Pertwee
Aunt Sally	Una Stubbs	Una Stubbs	Una Stubbs	Una Stubbs
The Crowman	Geoffrey Bayldon	Geoffrey Bayldon	Geoffrey Bayldon	Geoffrey Bayldon
John	Jeremy Austin	Jeremy Austin	Jeremy Austin	Jeremy Austin
Sue	Charlotte Coleman	Charlotte Coleman	Charlotte Coleman	Charlotte Coleman
Mr. Peters	Mike Berry	Mike Berry	Mike Berry	Mike Berry
Sgt. Beetroot	Bill Maynard	Bill Maynard	Bill Maynard	Bill Maynard
Saucy Nancy		Barbara Windsor	Barbara Windsor	
Dolly Clothes-Peg			Lorraine Chase	Lorraine Chase
Pickles Bramble	Wayne Norman	Wayne Norman	Wayne Norman	Wayne Norman
Mr. Braithwaite	Norman Bird	Norman Bird	Norman Bird	Norman Bird
Mr. Shepherd	Michael Ripper	Michael Ripper	Michael Ripper	Michael Ripper
Mrs. Braithwaite	Megs Jenkins	Megs Jenkins	Megs Jenkins	
Dafthead	Frank Marlborough	Frank Marlborough	Frank Marlborough	
Mrs. Bloomsbury-Barton	Joan Sims	Joan Sims		
Colonel Bloodstock			Thorley Walters	
Cobber Gummidge		Alex Scott		
Enid Simmons	Sarah Thomas	Sarah Thomas	Sarah Thomas	
PC Parsons	Norman Mitchell	Norman Mitchell	Norman Mitchell	Norman Mitchell
Jolly Jack				Bernard Cribbins
Aunt Sally II				Connie Booth

== Episode list ==
=== Series 1 ===
1. "Worzel's Washing Day" (25 February 1979) The Peters family moves into a caravan on Scatterbrook Farm, and John and Sue Peters meet Worzel Gummidge, a scarecrow who can come to life.
2. "A Home Fit for Scarecrows" (4 March 1979) John and Sue offer Worzel a proper chair for his home in the barn if he will teach them Worzelese; the scarecrow also gets the idea to steal a full set of furniture from the villagers.
3. "Aunt Sally" (11 March 1979) Worzel takes the afternoon off to go to the village fête to see his intended, Aunt Sally, even though she considers herself to be too good for him. Aunt Sally takes advantage of his feelings for her and persuades him to exchange places with her so she can escape being sold to a museum.
4. "The Crowman" (18 March 1979) Worzel begs his creator, the Crowman, to make him a handsome head so he can get a wife. After a disastrous visit to the home of Mrs. Bloomsbury-Barton, the scarecrow learns that it is more important to be handsome inside than out.
5. "A Little Learning" (25 March 1979) Worzel turns the farm upside down looking for his Clever Head. When he finds it at the nearby school and puts it on, he encounters a teacher who takes him for a genius.
6. "Worzel Pays a Visit" (1 April 1979) When Worzel is told that the runaway Aunt Sally is working as a housemaid at Mrs. Bloomsbury-Barton's home, he decides to pay her a call. But the mistress is away, and Sally pretends to be the lady of the house and invites Worzel in for tea, resulting in chaos.
7. "The Scarecrow Hop" (8 April 1979) Aunt Sally is in a despondent mood after being sacked from her position as lady's maid to Mrs. Bloomsbury-Barton. To cheer her up, Worzel asks her to the charity ball.

=== Series 2 ===
1. "Worzel and the Saucy Nancy" (6 January 1980) Worzel stows away on the coach taking a group of pensioners to the seaside. Once there, he meets Saucy Nancy, a gregarious ship's figurehead who wants to marry him. But the scarecrow also rescues his beloved Aunt Sally from a fairground and the three form a very unusual romantic triangle leading to disaster.
2. "Worzel's Nephew" (13 January 1980) With the Peters family away on holiday and Mike laid up with a sore ankle, Mr. Braithwaite hires a new farmhand: a Cockney lad who speaks in rhyming slang. The boy turns out to be Worzel's delinquent nephew Pickles Bramble who bullies his poor old uncle into doing all the dirty work on the farm for him.
3. "A Fishy Tale" (20 January 1980) When Worzel learns about fishing, he dusts off his "wangling" head and tries his luck catching the goldfish in Mrs. Bloomsbury-Barton's pond. Trouble comes when the maid mistakes him for the handyman come to fix the dishwasher.
4. "The Trial of Worzel Gummidge" (27 January 1980) After his latest foolish antic, Worzel is taken away by the Crowman and put on trial for failure to do his duty as a scarecrow as well as all his other mischief. The jury consists of all the local scarecrows but what's worse for Worzel is that the prosecutor is Aunt Sally!
5. "Very Good, Worzel" (3 February 1980) Worzel and Aunt Sally go looking for employment, he to get married, she to save up for a trip to "Hegypt." By a mix-up the agency sends them as butler and maid to the home of Lady Bloomsbury-Barton, who is having a fancy luncheon to impress her friend Lady Partington. The expected disaster ensues.
6. "Worzel in the Limelight" (10 February 1980) Worzel and Aunt Sally decide to enter the local talent contest but their failed attempts at a ventriloquist act make any cooperation impossible. They enter separately, she dancing to "Swan Lake" and he with a magic act; their efforts to sabotage one another make them the hit of the show.
7. "Fire Drill" (17 February 1980) The village is planning a big bonfire celebration and Mr. Braithwaite offers his old scarecrow to be burned - Worzel Gummidge. John and Sue help Worzel build another scarecrow to be burned in his place but the new one has strong objections to that plan.
8. "The Scarecrow Wedding" (24 February 1980) When she gets stuck in a washing machine at a junk shop, Aunt Sally promises to marry Worzel if he will rescue her. The deed done, he holds her to the promise and the Crowman reluctantly plans a traditional scarecrow wedding for the engaged couple.

=== Series 3 ===
1. "Moving On" (1 November 1980) The Braithwaites and the Peters return from holiday to find Scatterbrook Farm a shambles, courtesy of Worzel Gummidge and Aunt Sally. It is up to the Crowman to find a way out of trouble for the two foolish artifacts.
2. "Dolly Clothes Peg" (8 November 1980) Aunt Sally has run away to join the fair and poor lovesick Worzel follows her. He soon makes the acquaintance of the charming Dolly Clothes-Peg, a scarecrow who was once a fashion store mannequin in London, and the two hit it off, which is more than the jealous Aunt Sally can bear.
3. "A Fair Old Pullover" (15 November 1980) Worzel hitches a ride to town to shop for a new sweater to attract the attention of Aunt Sally. Once at the department store, he causes a commotion in the menswear department then is mistaken for the centerpiece of a display in the gardening section. All goes well until he is recognized by the Braithwaites as being the scarecrow stolen from their farm.
4. "Worzel the Brave" (22 November 1980) There's a new resident at the Hall, the imperious retired military man Colonel Bloodstock. Aunt Sally insinuates herself into the house as the parlor maid and Worzel tries to work up the courage to challenge the Colonel for her.
5. "Worzel's Wager" (29 November 1980) Following the example of all the humans he knows, Worzel takes an interest in gambling. After several failed attempts he decides to enter the Crowman's terrier Ratter in the local whippet race, because he has a trick up his sleeve to win.
6. "The Return of Dafthead" (6 December 1980) Dafthead, the scarecrow created by Worzel (in the episode "Fire Drill"), comes back and usurps Worzel's place as the scarecrow of Scatterbrook Farm. Worzel's attempts to regain his rightful place lead to a scarecrow duel—umbrellas at dawn!
7. "Captain Worzel" (13 December 1980) Mr. Shepherd hires a barge to take Aunt Sally down the river to sell to a museum. Worzel mounts a rescue mission with the aid of Saucy Nancy—even though Aunt Sally doesn't want to be rescued.
8. "Choir Practice" (20 December 1980) Worzel discovers that Aunt Sally has joined the church choir so she can partake of the luncheon served after choir practice. Thinking this a brilliant idea, he puts on his singing head and offers himself as a tenor, dreaming of the upcoming Harvest Festival picnic.

=== Christmas special ===
1. "A Cup o' Tea and a Slice o' Cake" (27 December 1980) It's Christmas Eve, a most important day for scarecrows as they must stand in position to guide Santa Claus back to the North Pole. Worzel Gummidge, however, deserts his post to enjoy the delights of the season, jeopardizing his chances for attending the Scarecrow Ball.

Unusually this double-length musical special did not have the Worzel Gummidge title sequence, "A Cup o' Tea and a Slice o' Cake" being its only on-screen title followed by "Starring Jon Pertwee" as per the standard titles.

=== Series 4 ===
1. "Muvver's Day" (31 October 1981) Worzel decides he needs a mother to look after him. The Crowman summons Sarah Pigswill who was made from the same turnip patch a season before Worzel. Mother and son are reunited for Worzel's birthday but she turns out not to be what the poor scarecrow was hoping for.
2. "The Return of Dolly Clothes-Peg" (7 November 1981) Dolly Clothes-Peg, the dressmaker's dummy turned scarecrow Worzel met last year, comes to town to visit her old friend. The jealous Aunt Sally tricks Dolly into the back of a moving van, setting up a confrontation wherein poor Worzel has to choose which of the wooden ladies will become his wife.
3. "The Jumbly Sale" (14 November 1981) At the Village Jumble Sale, Worzel Gummidge tries to free Aunt Sally from a box she is stuck in and accidentally breaks off her leg. He is so filled with guilt and despair that he pleads with the Crowman to chuck him on the compost heap. Worzel soon changes his mind when he learns that Aunt Sally was purchased by Gypsy Joe—dealer in firewood!
4. "Worzel in Revolt" (21 November 1981) After a particularly outrageous series of adventures, the Crowman has Worzel and Aunt Sally hide out at his home, serving as his parlor maid and valet. When Aunt Sally bullies and charms Worzel into doing all of her work for her, the Crowman makes him a Disobedient Head so he can stand up to her.
5. "Will the Real Aunt Sally...?" (28 November 1981) A second, sweeter Aunt Sally comes to town, causing much confusion for the lovesick Worzel Gummidge, who can't tell the two Aunt Sallies apart.
6. "The Golden Hind" (5 December 1981) A fish and chips shop opens in town and Worzel becomes good friends with Jolly Jack, the ship's figurehead that stands out front. The friendship runs aground when the rakish seaman meets the flirtatious Aunt Sally and they leave poor Worzel adrift in his misery.
7. "Worzel's Birthday" (12 December 1981) It's Worzel's Bestest Birthday and the poor scarecrow is sulking because snooty Aunty Sally refuses to attend his party. John and Sue put together a surprise party for him but Worzel still needs to learn not to be so selfish about his birthday.

=== New Zealand series ===
==== Series 1 ====
1. "As The Scarecrow Flies" (4 October 1987)
2. "The Sleeping Beauty" (11 October 1987)
3. "Full Employment" (18 October 1987)
4. "Worzel's Handicap" (25 October 1987)
5. "King of the Scarecrows" (1 November 1987)
6. "Ten Heads Are Better Than One" (8 November 1987)
7. "Worzel to the Rescue" (15 November 1987)
8. "Slave Scarecrow" (22 November 1987)
9. "The Traveller Unmasked" (29 November 1987)
10. "A Friend in Need" (6 December 1987)

==== Series 2 ====
1. "Stage Struck" (29 January 1989)
2. "A Red Sky in T'Morning"(5 February 1989)
3. "Them Thar Hills" (12 February 1989)
4. "The Beauty Contest" (19 February 1989)
5. "Bulbous Cauliflower" (26 February 1989)
6. "Weevily Swede" (5 March 1989)
7. "Elementary My Dear Worty" (12 March 1989)
8. "Dreams of Avarish" (19 March 1989)
9. "Runaway Train" (26 March 1989)
10. "Aunt Sally, R.A." (2 April 1989)
11. "Wattle Hearthbrush" (9 April 1989)
12. "The Bestest Scarecrow" (16 April 1989)

== Stage musical ==
A stage musical adaptation, titled Worzel Gummidge - The Musical, was created by the TV series creators Keith Waterhouse and Willis Hall with music by Denis King and featuring the original TV principal cast Jon Pertwee, Una Stubbs and Geoffrey Bayldon. The musical first premiered at the Birmingham Repertory Theatre for the 1980 Christmas season, receiving rave reviews and transferring to the Cambridge Theatre in London's West End from 22 December 1981 and extending to 27 February 1982. The Original London 1981 Cast Album was recorded at Abbey Road Studios; It featured 15 songs and 4 bonus tracks titled The Worzel Gummidge Christmas Maxi Single.

== Legacy ==
- In the early 1980s, British Labour Party leader Michael Foot was satirically compared to Worzel Gummidge as a criticism of his allegedly unkempt appearance.
- A Worzel Gummidge figurine was fixed to Jon Pertwee's coffin for his funeral at Putney Vale Cemetery.
- In 2016, Miwk Publishing released The Worzel Book, the first complete history of the series, written by Stuart Manning. The book gathered more than 40 interviews with surviving cast and crew, plus hundreds of rare and unseen photographs. The League of Gentlemen's Mark Gatiss contributed a foreword.
- Popular professional wrestling review podcast OSW Review frequently refers to wrestler and former WWE road agent Rene Goulet as Worzel due to his similar appearance and hairstyle to the character.

== Home media releases ==
- Worzel Gummidge Box Set – Series 1–4 and Christmas Special – Region 4 (Australia and New Zealand)
- Worzel Gummidge Ultimate – Series 1–4, Christmas Special, and Down Under – Region 2 (UK)
- Worzel Gummidge The complete collection Series 1–4, Down Under Series 1–2 and Christmas Special Region 2 (UK)
- In 2018, the original film negatives for Worzel Gummidge were located and catalogued by researchers Richard Latto and Stuart Manning, having been thought lost for many years. The Christmas Special episode "A Cup o' Tea and a Slice o' Cake" was restored from the film negatives and released on DVD.
- Worzel Gummidge: The Complete Series 1–4 Blu-ray was released 26 December 2022 in Region B. The release is fully restored from the original camera negatives and includes extensive bonus material.
- Worzel Gummidge Down Under: The Complete Restored Edition was released on 23 November 2023 in Region B, restored from the original 16mm film.
- Worzel Gummidge: The Combined Harvest Complete Edition was released on 23 November 2023 in Region B, combining the Blu-ray releases of Series 1-4 and Down Under Series 1-2.
