= Worzel Gummidge (2019 TV series) =

Television series about a fictional scarecrow

- Genre: Fantasy; Drama
- Based on: Worzel Gummidge series by Barbara Euphan Todd
- Written by: Mackenzie Crook
- Directed by: Mackenzie Crook
- Starring: Mackenzie Crook; India Brown; Thierry Wickens; Steve Pemberton; Rosie Cavaliero; Francesca Mills; Vicki Pepperdine; Shirley Henderson; Vanessa Redgrave
- Theme music composer: Adrian McNally
- Composers: Adrian McNally; Rachel Unthank
- Country of origin: United Kingdom
- Original language: English
- No. of series: 2
- No. of episodes: 6

Production
- Executive producers: Kristian Smith; Lisa Thomas; Mackenzie Crook; Patrick D. Pidgeon; Eric S. Rollman
- Producer: Georgie Fallon
- Editor: Simon Reglar
- Production companies: Leopard Pictures; Treasure Trove Productions; Lola Entertainment; Pidgeon Entertainment

Original release
- Network: BBC One
- Release: 26 December 2019 – 29 December 2021

Worzel Gummidge is a British fantasy drama television series and an adaptation of the Worzel Gummidge books by Barbara Euphan Todd. It stars Mackenzie Crook, who also wrote and directed the series, as the scarecrow. It was produced by Leopard Pictures and aired on BBC One between 26 December 2019 and 29 December 2021.

A third episode was announced as in production by the BBC on 8 September 2020, and was broadcast on Christmas Eve 2020.

A fourth episode had been set to broadcast in 2020 but production was halted due to the COVID-19 pandemic. This episode was broadcast on 6 November 2021 with two further episodes broadcast on the BBC in late December 2021.

== Cast ==
- Mackenzie Crook as Worzel Gummidge
- India Brown as Susan
- Thierry Wickens as John
- Zoë Wanamaker as Lady Bloomsbury Barton
- Rosie Cavaliero as Mrs Reenie Braithwaite
- Steve Pemberton as Mr Henry Braithwaite
- Vicki Pepperdine as Aunt Sally
- Michael Palin as The Green Man
- Francesca Mills as Earthy Mangold
- Shirley Henderson as Saucy Nancy
- Brian Blessed as Abraham Longshanks
- Vanessa Redgrave as Peg
- Spencer Jones as Reggie
- Paul Kaye as Guy Forks
- Toby Jones as Mayor Mr Whittington, Baker Mr Whitebread, Alderman Mr Wheelturn, Postmaster Mr Whistler, Butcher Mr Winkelman & Publican Mr Wheatsheaf.
- Aaron Neil as Lee Dangerman
- Bill Bailey as Mr Peregrine
- Nneka Okoye as Calliope Jane
- Tim Plester as Clarty and Fisherman Sam

== Production ==
The programme was written and directed by Mackenzie Crook and was produced by Leopard Pictures, Treasure Trove Productions and Lola Entertainment. Kristian Smith was the executive producer for Leopard Pictures with Lisa Thomas and Mackenzie Crook executive producers for Lola Entertainment and Treasure Trove Productions respectively. Patrick D. Pidgeon and Eric S. Rollman were executive producers for Pidgeon Entertainment, Inc. the rights holders to Worzel Gummidge. The music was written by Adrian McNally and performed by Northumberland band The Unthanks, the group having provided two songs for Crook's previous sitcom Detectorists.

Filming locations in Hertfordshire and Bedfordshire include: Valence End Farm near Dunstable, Bedfordshire used for Scatterbrook Farm scenes; countryside near Berry Bushes Farm in Kings Langley, Hertfordshire for the Ten Acre Field scenes; and Highfield Park in St Albans, Hertfordshire for Earthy’s allotment scenes.

== Episodes ==
=== Series overview ===
Series	Episodes	Originally released	
Series	Episodes	First released	Last released
1	2	26 December 2019	27 December 2019
1S	1	24 December 2020	
2	3	6 November 2021	29 December 2021

=== Series 1 (2019) ===
No.	Title	Written and directed by	Original release date	Viewers (millions)
1	"The Scarecrow of Scatterbrook"	Mackenzie Crook	26 December 2019	6.86
2	"The Green Man"	Mackenzie Crook	27 December 2019	5.09

=== Special (2020) ===
No.	Title	Written and directed by	Original release date	Viewers (millions)
3	"The Saucy Nancy"	Mackenzie Crook	24 December 2020	4.15
When Worzel Gummidge, Susan and John visit a scrapyard, Worzel overhears the grumbling of a foul-mouthed old friend - the carved ship's figurehead, Saucy Nancy. She has been languishing, unsold in the yard for years and longs to return to the sea. Worzel and the kids promise to get her there, but the ship may not be waiting. Adventure unfurls, as the strange foursome navigate their way to the coast. In a rare trip out of Scatterbrook, Worzel gets to see a wild moorland and the spectacular white cliffs of Seashell that provide the backdrop to this story of friendship and belonging.

=== Series 2 (2021) ===
No.	Title	Written and directed by	Original release date	Viewers (millions)
4	"Guy Forks"	Mackenzie Crook	6 November 2021	3.61
5	"Twitchers"	Mackenzie Crook	28 December 2021	3.49
6	"Calliope Jane"	Mackenzie Crook	29 December 2021	<(3.49)
At the museum, Aunt Sally finds herself agreeing to go on an adventure with another ex-fairground attraction, Calliope Jane, and it turns out Worzel is not the only scarecrow who wants to attend the fair.
