= Ortu Hassenbrook Academy =

Mossbourne Portside Academy

Location
- Hassenbrook Road; Stanford-le-Hope, Essex, SS17 0NS; England; 51.51762°N 0.4366°E

Information
- Type: Academy
- Motto: Opportunity Through Learning
- Established: 1952
- Founder: Arthur Thomas Bugler
- Local authority: Thurrock Council
- Trust: Mossbourne Federation
- Department for Education URN: 143424 Tables
- Ofsted: Reports
- Headteacher: Sally Feeney
- Gender: Coeducational
- Age: 11 to 16
- Houses: Moore, Hamilton, Hoy
- Website: http://www.ortuhassenbrook.org/

Mossbourne Portside Academy formerly Ortu Hassenbrook Academy is a coeducational secondary school located in Stanford-le-Hope, Essex, England.

== History ==
Originally established as Hassenbrook Secondary Modern School in 1952, it later became a comprehensive school administered by Thurrock Council. Arthur Thomas Bugler was headteacher from the school opening until 1955. The school also gained specialist status as a Technology College. In September 2011 it converted to academy status and was renamed Hassenbrook Academy. In September 2016 the school became part of the Ortu Federation and was renamed Ortu Hassenbrook Academy. In March 2022 Sally Feeney became permanent headteacher, having served in the position "temporarily" for a year until she had gained the required qualifications.

The school offers GCSEs and BTECs as programmes of study for pupils. Although Ortu Hassenbrook Academy does not offer its own sixth form provision, the school has links to Ortu Sixth form operated by Ortu Gable Hall School.

In Mid 2024 it was announced that the 3 Ortu schools were acquired by Mossbourne Federation and the three schools into new names Mossbourne Community Academy.

== Notable former pupils ==
- Graham Bright, politician and Cambridgeshire Police and Crime Commissioner
- Jordan Gray, comedian and singer
- Phill Jupitus, comedian
- Mark Kaylor, boxer
- Elton Prince, professional wrestler
- Robin Ward, Anglican priest and Principal of St Stephen's House
