= Miss Ranskill Comes Home =

First edition (publ. Chapman & Hall)

Miss Ranskill Comes Home is a novel by Barbara Euphan Todd. It was first published in 1946, under her married name, Barbara Bower.

== Plot introduction ==
The novel tells the story of a woman who returns to England after being stranded on a desert island during the Second World War.

== Reception ==
Rosamund Lehmann described it as "a work of great originality … a blend of fantasy, satire and romantic comedy". The novel was reissued in 2003 by Persephone Books.

== Notes ==
- Book Page at Persephone Books
