= The Return of the Antelope =

British children's television series (1986–1988)

- Genre: Fantasy
- Created by: Willis Hall
- Directed by: Eugene Ferguson
- Starring: John Quentin; John Branwell; Fiona McArthur
- Composer: Wilfred Josephs
- Country of origin: United Kingdom
- Original language: English
- No. of series: 4
- No. of episodes: 27

Production
- Executive producer: Eugene Ferguson
- Running time: 24 minutes

Original release
- Network: ITV
- Release: 19 January 1986 – 19 November 1988

The Return of the Antelope is a British television series aired on ITV between 19 January 1986 and 19 November 1988, written by Willis Hall, directed and produced by Eugene Ferguson and composed by Wilfred Josephs. It was a children's fantasy series about two English children, circa 1899, who befriend a group of shipwrecked Lilliputians.

== Cast ==
- Julie Shipley / Nanny (2 episodes, 1986)
- Gail Harrison / Brelca 1 (1986) (Series 1-2)
- Annie Hulley / Brelca 2 (1988) (Series 3-4)
- John Quentin / Fistram
- John Branwell / Spelbush
- Alan Bowyer / Gerald
- Claudia Gambold / Philippa
- Paul Chapman / Harwell Mincing
- Stephanie Cole / Sarah Mincing
- Derek Farr / Mr. Garstanton (1986) (Series 1-2)
- Richard Vernon / Mr. Garstanton (1988) (Series 3-4)
- Fiona McArthur / Millie
- Erica Sail / Emily Wilkins (1988) (Series 3-4)
- Garry Halliday / Ernest (1988) (Series 3-4)
- Robert Moore / Edwin (1988) (Series 3, episodes 4 & 5)
- Kate Nixon / Edwin’s Sister (1988) (series 3, episodes 4 and 5)

== Episode list ==
=== Series 1 ===
Overall	Series	Title	Directed by	Written by	Air date
1	1	"Castaways"	Eugene Ferguson	Willis Hall	19 January 1986
2	2	"Lost and Found"	Eugene Ferguson	Willis Hall	26 January 1986
3	3	"Studio Portraits"	Eugene Ferguson	Willis Hall	2 February 1986
4	4	"Piano Lessons"	Eugene Ferguson	Willis Hall	9 February 1986
5	5	"Everything in the Garden"	Eugene Ferguson	Willis Hall	16 February 1986
6	6	"Where the Heart Is"	Eugene Ferguson	Willis Hall	23 February 1986

=== Series 2 ===
Overall	Series	Title	Directed by	Written by	Air date
7	1	"Brelca Goes Ballooning"	Eugene Ferguson	Willis Hall	26 October 1986
8	2	"Philippa's Brave Deed"	Eugene Ferguson	Willis Hall	2 November 1986
9	3	"Pagoda of Doom"	Eugene Ferguson	Willis Hall	9 November 1986
10	4	"The Lost Park"	Eugene Ferguson	Willis Hall	16 November 1986
11	5	"The Bottle of Amontillado"	Eugene Ferguson	Willis Hall	23 November 1986
12	6	"Mrs Mallarby's Day"	Eugene Ferguson	Willis Hall	30 November 1986
13	7	"Moving On"	Eugene Ferguson	Willis Hall	7 December 1986
14	8	"The Antelope Christmas"	Eugene Ferguson	Willis Hall	21 December 1986

=== Series 3 ===
Overall	Series	Title	Directed by	Written by	Air date
15	1	"Travelling Companions"	Eugene Ferguson	Willis Hall	17 January 1988
16	2	"Home Again"	Eugene Ferguson	Willis Hall	24 January 1988
17	3	"Emily"	Eugene Ferguson	Willis Hall	31 January 1988
18	4	"Back to the Sea"	Eugene Ferguson	Willis Hall	7 February 1988
19	5	"Footprints in the Sand"	Eugene Ferguson	Willis Hall	14 February 1988
20	6	"Sea Fever"	Eugene Ferguson	Willis Hall	21 February 1988
21	7	"That's the Way to Do It!"	Eugene Ferguson	Willis Hall	28 February 1988

=== Series 4 ===
Overall	Series	Title	Directed by	Written by	Original date
22	1	"Military Manoeuvres"	Eugene Ferguson	Willis Hall	15 October 1988
23	2	"The Secret of the Municipal Museum"	Eugene Ferguson	Willis Hall	22 October 1988
24	3	"Municipal Museum Hide and Seek"	Eugene Ferguson	Willis Hall	29 October 1988
25	4	"Brave Deeds and Gallant Actions"	Eugene Ferguson	Willis Hall	5 November 1988
26	5	"The Stuff That Dreams Are Made Of"	Eugene Ferguson	Willis Hall	12 November 1988
27	6	"Bonfire Celebrations"	Eugene Ferguson	Willis Hall	19 November 1988
