= Worzel Gummidge Down Under =

New Zealand-British television series (1987–1989)

- Created by: Keith Waterhouse; Willis Hall
- Based on: Characters by Barbara Euphan Todd
- Starring: Jon Pertwee; Una Stubbs; Bruce Phillips
- Countries of origin: New Zealand; United Kingdom
- No. of seasons: 2
- No. of episodes: 22

Production
- Running time: 25 minutes
- Production companies: Grahame J. McLean & Associates

Original release
- Network: Television New Zealand, Channel 4 (UK)
- Release: 4 October 1987 – 16 April 1989

Worzel Gummidge Down Under is a New Zealand-British television series that aired from 1987 to 1989. Adapted from the books written by Barbara Euphan Todd, it is a sequel/continuation of the 1979-81 British television series Worzel Gummidge, starring Jon Pertwee. The story continues in New Zealand when Worzel's beloved Aunt Sally (played by Una Stubbs) is sold to a museum owner in New Zealand and Worzel follows her there. The first seven episodes were from scripts written in 1983 for a spin-off series called Worzel Gummidge in Ireland. The series was abandoned, so the scripts - plus three new episodes, were rewritten for a New Zealand setting.

Though the original Worzel Gummidge series was made by Southern Television for the ITV network, the Down Under series was co-produced by Television New Zealand and the UK's Channel 4, which screened the series. Pertwee and Stubbs were the only actors to reprise their roles from the original.

Worzel Gummidge Down Under ran for two series between 1987 and 1989, before being cancelled.

== Cast ==
- Jon Pertwee as Worzel Gummidge
- Bruce Phillips as The Crowman
- Jonathan Marks as Mickey
- Olivia Ihimaera-Smiler as Manu
- Una Stubbs as Aunt Sally
- Wi Kuki Kaa as Travelling Scarecrow Maker (S1)
- Michael Haigh as Professor Pike (S1)/Seamus McCracker (S2)
- Patupatu Ripley as Mrs Te Wheke (S1)
- Joy Watson as Mrs Peacock (S1)
- Gerald Bryan as Rooney (S1)
- David Copeland as Commissionaire Gilbert (S1)
- Kate Harcourt as Tilly Thurston (S1)
- Michael Wilson as Father O'Malley (S1)
- Peter Harcourt as the Captain (S1)/Mr Birkenshaw (S2)
- Bob Gillespie as Golf Club Secretary (S1)
- Brian Sergent as Damnation Take It (Meldew Turnip) (S1)/Terence (S2)
- Lee Hatherly as Trudi Von Crotchet (S1)
- William Kircher as the Farmer (S1)
- Ross Joley as PC Peacock (S2)
- Maria James as Eloise (S2)
- Stuart Devenie as Jeremy Carp (S2)
- Aaron Taylor as Robert Mahoney (S2)
- David Telford as Prospector (S2)
- Gilbert Goldie as the Postie/Commissionaire (S2)
- John Callen as the Bailiff (S2)
- Ellie Smith as the Punk Girl/Wattle Hearthbrush (S2)
- Lorae Parry as Miss Nightingale (S2)
- Brenda Kendall as Madame Creveny (S2)
- Jonathan Elsom as Duke Ferguson (S2)
- David Weatherley as Bulbous Cauliflower (S2)
- Mark Wright as Rory (S2)
- Peter Jackson as Jock (S2)
- Peter Rowley as Weevily Swede (S2)
- Ian Mune as Worty Yam (S2)
- Danny Mulheron as Blighty Tator (S2)
- Ian Watkin as Bully Hayes (S2)
- Anne Budd as Madame Forcati (S2)
- Duncan Smith as Aubergine (S2)
- Lewis Martin as the Professor (S2)
- Lewis Rowe as Henry De Solomon (S2)
- Keith Richardson as Mr Hoskins (S2)
- Caroline Hutchison as Sister Aloyishea (S2)
- Prue Langbein as Sister Agnes (S2)
- Meriol Buchanan as Mother Superior (S2)
- Ian McClynmont as Governor General (S2)
- Geoffrey Heath as the Secretary (S2)
- Peter Dennett as Daghead (S2)

== Episodes ==
=== Series 1 ===
1. "As the Scarecrow Flies" (4 October 1987) - Aunt Sally & Worzel fly to New Zealand; and meet the Crowman
2. "The Sleeping Beauty" (11 October 1987) - Worzel meets Mickey & Manu; and go to find Aunt Sally at the Piwakawaka Museum
3. "Full Employment" (18 October 1987) - Worzel runs off with Rooney's drum, then consequently gets used as a clothes prop
4. "Worzel's Handicap" (25 October 1987) - Worzel causes chaos at the Golf Club
5. "King of the Scarecrows" (1 November 1987) - Worzel names a scarecrow whose on his post, and the Travelling Scarecrow Maker visits the Crowman
6. "Ten Heads Are Better Than One " (8 November 1987) - Worzel, Mickey & Manu rescue Worzel's heads from the Museum, that have been sent over from England
7. "Worzel to the Rescue" (15 November 1987) - Worzel goes to rescue Aunt Sally from the Travelling Scarecrow Maker
8. "Slave Scarecrow" (22 November 1987) - Worzel falls into the clutches of the Travelling Scarecrow Maker
9. "The Traveller Unmasked" (29 November 1987) - Aunt Sally attempts to rescue Worzel from the Travelling Scarecrow Maker
10. "A Friend in Need" (6 December 1987) - It's Worzel's birthday, and he's planning a tea party

=== Series 2 ===
1. "Stage Struck" (29 January 1989) - The ballet comes to town, and Aunt Sally wants to join in
2. "A Red Sky in T'Morning" (5 February 1989) - The Crowman has financial problems
3. "Them Thar Hills" (12 February 1989) - Mickey, Manu & the Crowman prepare for Worzel's funeral; meanwhile he's gold mining
4. "The Beauty Contest" (19 February 1989) - Aunt Sally wants to enter the Beauty Contest, not realising it's for dogs
5. "Balbous Cauliflower" (26 February 1989) - Worzel has to show Bulbous how to bird scare; but then Bulbous becomes ill
6. "Weevily Swede" (5 March 1989) - Weevily Swede visits, and Worzel is accused of his murder
7. "Elementary My Dear Worty" (12 March 1989) - Worzel tries to find out who stole the Golden Turnip
8. "Dreams of Avarish" (19 March 1989) - Aunt Sally goes off to dig for gold
9. "The Runaway Train" (26 March 1989) - Worzel & Blighty take over a train
10. "Aunt Sally, R.A." (2 April 1989) - Worzel wants to be an artist, but Aunt Sally steals his paintings
11. "Wattle Hearthbrush" (9 April 1989) - The Crowman is asked to make a female scarecrow for the convent
12. "The Bestest Scarecrow" (16 April 1989) - The Crowman sets out to find his best Scarecrow, to go on the General's front lawn

== DVD release ==
- Worzel Gummidge Ultimate – Series 1–4, Christmas Special, and Down Under – Region 2 (UK)
