= Transaction (TV series) =

British television series

- Genre: Sitcom
- Created by: Jordan Gray
- Written by: Jordan Gray
- Directed by: Ollie Parsons
- Starring: Jordan Gray; Nick Frost; Doon Mackichan; Thomas Gray; Francesca Mills
- Country of origin: United Kingdom
- Original language: English
- No. of series: 1
- No. of episodes: 6

Production
- Executive producers: Kenton Allen; Lucy Robinson; Jordan Gray; Nick Frost
- Producer: Lara Singer
- Production company: Big Talk Studios

Original release
- Network: ITV2; ITVX
- Release: 24 June – 29 July 2025

Transaction is a six-part British sitcom series created by and starring Jordan Gray and co-starring Nick Frost. It began broadcasting on ITV2 and ITVX on 24 June 2025.

== Premise ==
Set in County Durham, a trans supermarket employee, hired for diversity purposes, turns into an egomaniac.

== Cast ==
- Jordan Gray as Olivia ‘Liv’
- Nick Frost as Simon
- Doon Mackichan as Freida
- Thomas Gray as Tom
- Francesca Mills as Millie
- Kayla Meikle as Beefy Linda

== Production ==
The series was first announced in 2022 and is based on a 2020 online series that Jordan Gray made for Comedy Central, although it does not repeat the original storylines and instead features all new material.

The six-part series was commissioned by ITVX and is a Big Talk Studios production. The series is written and created by Gray and the executive producers are Kenton Allen, Lucy Robinson, Jordan Gray, and Nick Frost, and the producer is Lara Singer. It is directed by Ollie Parsons. The series is produced in association with and will be distributed by ITV Studios.

The cast is led by Gray and Frost, alongside Doon Mackichan, Thomas Gray and Francesca Mills. Filming took place in late 2024 in Hartlepool.

=== Accolades ===
In March 2026, Gray was nominated for Comedy Performance – Female at the 2026 Royal Television Society Programme Awards.
