= Sing Date =

British reality television series

Sing Date, unofficially billed as dating by music, is a TV series which started in summer 2012 on Sky Living in the United Kingdom. Contestants go on a date, having chosen a partner from a list of videos of people singing. At the end of the date, they enter a studio and sing a song together.

The programme's voiceover comes from actress Sally Lindsay.
