= Frederick Nicholson Betts =

- Born: 25 October 1906
- Died: 22 August 1973 (aged 66)
- Occupations: Ornithologist, Army officer

Lieutenant-Colonel Frederick Nicholson Betts (25 October 1906 – 22 August 1973) was a coffee plantation manager, British Indian Army officer, a political agent, and an ornithologist.

== Biography ==
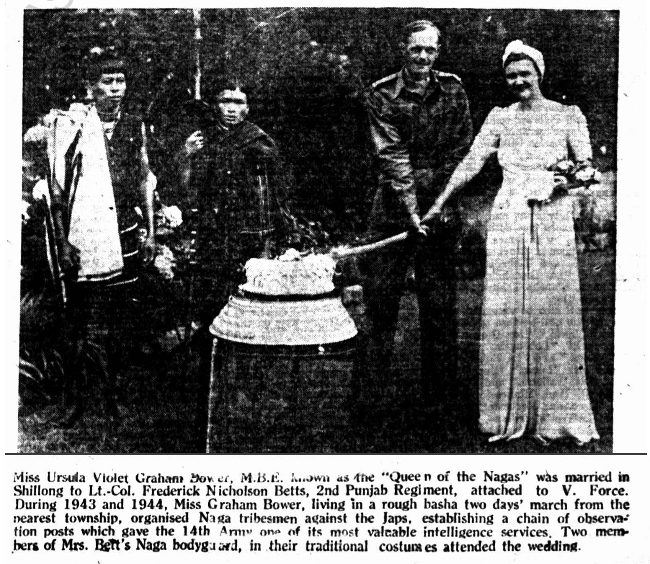
Photograph of the wedding in Shillong from The Bombay Chronicle, 9 September 1945

F. N. Betts (known to friends and family as "Tim"), was born in Launceston, Cornwall, in the UK to Barbara Treby Morshead and Herbert Nicholas Betts. He studied at Winchester College from 1920 to 1924. He went to Ceylon and worked in the tea plantations there and later in the coffee plantations in Coorg. He was commissioned in India as a captain in the Punjab Regiment, second lieutenant (12 September 1929, Lt. 20 June 1930, moving from the reserve to the Indian Army on 1 August 1932) and in 1940, was posted to Eritrea. He was later posted lieutenant colonel (intelligence) in the V Force in the Burma campaign, a guerrilla and intelligence unit in north eastern India which made use of Assam Hill tribesmen. Here he met Ursula Graham Bower, an anthropologist studying the Nagas, whom he married in 1945. The couple had two daughters, Catriona and Alison.

In 1946, the government of India made him the first political officer of the Subansiri area between the Assam plains and the McMahon Line (the boundary between India and Tibet). His first task was to march 60 miles into the interior to establish a supply drop zone and to set up a base which could provide supplies for the administrative setup there amid tribes such as the Nyishis and Apa Tanis.

A year after India's independence, he moved to Kenya and served in the veterinary service in the Western Masai Reserve. He later moved from Kenya to the Island of Mull in Scotland where he farmed the Ardura Estate and spent time studying birds, and in 1967 he moved again to the New Forest in Southern England. He died of a stroke when out riding in the New Forest in 1973.

== Natural history ==
During his time in various remote places he studied the local birds and butterflies. He was among the first to study and report from the remote Khru valley, the Coorg district in southern India as well as from parts of northeast India and Africa. While in India he was an active member of the Bombay Natural History Society. He worked at coffee plantations in Coorg at Coovercully near Somwarpet and Yemmegundi at Pollibetta. His studies of the birds of Coorg during this time led to his major work on the birds of Coorg which he published in the Journal of the Bombay Natural History Society to "complement" the results of the Mysore survey that Salim Ali was undertaking at around the same time. His work was ahead of his time in that the entire study was based purely on observations and not primarily based on collected skins. He was also among the pioneers of bird photography in India. His notes document the differences in the avifauna of the dry and wet zones of Coorg and also provide arrival dates for local and long-distance migrants. The editors of the Journal of the Bombay Natural History Society noted:

Mr F. N. Betts contributed a well illustrated paper on the Birds of a South Indian Tank in the Province of Coorg. Ecological notes of this description covering bird life in relation to a particular environment deserve encouragement and indicate a line of study which might with advantage be followed by others in the country.

Many of his notes on the birdlife of India were used by Salim Ali.

His work in Kenya led to a major paper, "The Birds of Masai". He also took an interest in orchid cultivation. He became a member of the Hampshire Field Club's Ornithological section and of the Hampshire Naturalists' Trust. He was secretary of the New Forest Beagles, served on the New Forest Consultative Panel, and was a treasurer of the Burley Branch of the British Legion.

== Publications ==
JBNHS here is short for the Journal of the Bombay Natural History Society.

- (1965) "Notes on some resident breeding birds of southwest Kenya". Ibis. 108 (4): 513-530.
- (1957) "Halcyon pileata inland". JBNHS. 54 (2): 462.
- (1956) "Notes on birds of the Subansiri area, Assam". JBNHS. 53 (3): 397-414.
- (1956) "Colonization of islands by White-eyes (Zosterops spp.)". JBNHS. 53 (3): 472-473.
- (1954) "Occurrence of the Blacknecked Crane (Grus nigricollis) in Indian limits". JBNHS. 52 (2&3): 605-606.
- (1952) "Birds nesting on telegraph wires". JBNHS. 51 (1): 271-272.
- (1952) "The breeding seasons of birds in the hills of South India". Ibis. 94 (4): 621-628.
- (1951) "The birds of Coorg. Part II". JBNHS. 50 (2): 224-263.
- (1951) "The birds of Coorg. Part I". JBNHS. 50 (1): 20-63.
- (1950) "Tangkhul Naga Pottery-Making". Man. 50: 117-118.
- (1950) "On a collection of butterflies from the Balipara Frontier Tract and the Subansiri Area. (Northern Assam)". JBNHS. 49 (3): 488-502.
- (1948) "The flight of Storks on migration". Ibis. 90 (1): 150-151.
- (1947) "Bird life in an Assam jungle". JBNHS. 46 (4): 667-684.
- (1940) "Birds of the Seychelles - 2. The sea-birds more particularly those of Aride Island". Ibis (14) 4: 489–504.
- (1939) "The breeding of the Indian Sooty Tern (Sterna fuscata infuscata) in the Laccadive Islands". JBNHS. 40 (4): 763-764.
- (1938) "The birds of the Laccadive Islands". JBNHS. 40 (3): 382-387.
- (1938) "Some birds of a Coorg down". JBNHS. 40 (1): 39-48.
- (1937) "Bird life on a southern Indian tank" JBNHS. 39 (3): 594-602.
- (1936) "Wanted information about heronries in South India". JBNHS. 39 (1): 183.
- (1935) "Nidification of the Blackheaded Babbler Rhopocichla a. atriceps (Oates)". JBNHS. 38 (1): 189.
- (1935) "Arrival dates of migrant birds in Coorg". JBNHS. 38 (1): 197.
- (1934) "Dates of arrival of migrant birds in Coorg in 1932" JBNHS. 37 (1): 225.
- (1934) "South Indian Woodpeckers". JBNHS. 37 (1): 197-203.
- (1932) "Notes on some Ceylon birds". JBNHS. 36 (1): 257-259.
- (1931) "The Bulbuls of the Nilgiris". JBNHS. 34 (4): 1024-1028.
- (1930) "Migration notes in 1929 from the Nilgiri District". JBNHS. 34 (2): 569.
- (1929) "Notes on the birds of Coorg". JBNHS. 33 (3): 542-551.
- (1929) "Bird movements in Coorg". JBNHS. 33 (3): 718-719.
- (1929) "Migration of the Pied Crested Cuckoo Clamator jacobinus". JBNHS. 33 (3): 714.
- (1929) " Distribution of the Brown Shrike Lanius cristatus cristatus". JBNHS. 33(3):714.

== Works based on his life ==
Two BBC Radio 4 programs, The Naga Queen, produced by Chris Eldon Lee and narrated by John Horsley Denton, and The Butterfly Hunt, a play by Matthew Solon were based on the life of F. N. Betts and his wife Ursula Graham Bower.

== Other sources ==
- Bower, Ursula Graham (1950). Naga Path. London, John Murray.
- Bower, Ursula Graham (1953). The Hidden Land. London, John Murray.
