= Barbara Euphan Todd =

English children's writer (1898-1976)

- Born: 9 January 1898; Arksey, Doncaster, Yorkshire, England
- Died: 2 February 1976 (aged 78); Donnington, Berkshire, England
- Occupation: Writer
- Known for: Creator of Worzel Gummidge
- Spouse: John Graham Bower (m. 1932; died 1940)
- Children: Ursula Betts (stepdaughter)

Barbara Euphan Todd (9 January 1898 – 2 February 1976) was an English writer widely remembered for her ten books for children about a scarecrow called Worzel Gummidge. These were adapted for radio and television. The title story was chosen as the first in the publisher's new series, Puffin Books.

== Early life ==
Todd was born at Arksey, near Doncaster, then in the West Riding of Yorkshire, as the only child of an Anglican vicar, Thomas Todd, and his wife Alice Maud Mary (née Bentham). Barbara was brought up in the village of Soberton, Hampshire and educated at St Catherine's School, Bramley, near Guildford. Surrey. She worked as a VAD during the First World War. After her father's retirement, she lived with her parents in Surrey and began writing.

== Writings ==
Much of Todd's early work was published in magazines such as Punch and The Spectator, but she also wrote two volumes of poems about children, illustration on the top board was by Ernest Shepard and a dustwrapper illustrated by Margaret Tarrant: Hither and Thither (The book itself was not illustrated) (1927) and The Seventh Daughter (1935).

In the 1920s, Todd started writing novels for children, some of them in collaboration with her husband, Naval Commander John Graham Bower (1886–1940), whom she married in 1932. The couple moved to Blewbury near Oxford, where Bower wrote fiction and essays under the pseudonym "Klaxon", and Todd, as "Barbara Euphan", for South Country Secrets (1935). Together they wrote The Touchstone, in which observation of the countryside is joined by interest in its history, in a similar way to Rudyard Kipling's Puck of Pook's Hill. Commander Bower died in 1940.

Todd's only novel for adults was Miss Ranskill Comes Home (1946), which tells of a woman who returns to England after being stranded on a desert island during World War II.

Todd continued to write novels into her old age: the last appeared in 1972. Among her other works were adaptations of folk stories for radio, and plays and stories written in collaboration with other writers, but it is mainly her books about Worzel Gummidge that still attract readers.

=== Worzel Gummidge ===
Todd's ten novels about Worzel Gummidge, a scarecrow who comes to life, are:

- Worzel Gummidge, or The Scarecrow of Scatterbrook (1936)
- Worzel Gummidge Again (1937)
- More About Worzel Gummidge (1938)
- Worzel Gummidge and Saucy Nancy (1947)
- Worzel Gummudge Takes A Holiday (1949)
- Earthy Mangold and Worzel Gummidge (1954)
- Worzel Gummidge and the Railway Scarecrows (1955)
- Worzel Gummidge At The Circus (1956)
- Worzel Gummidge and the Treasure Ship (1958)
- Detective Worzel Gummidge (1963)

The novels have been illustrated by various artists, including Diana Stanley, Elisabeth Alldridge, Will Nickless and Jill Crockford.

In the 1950s, Todd collaborated with Denis and Mabel Constanduros on a series of Worzel Gummidge radio plays for children. A television series, Worzel Gummidge Turns Detective, was made in 1953. In 1967, five Worzel Gummidge stories were narrated by Gordon Rollings in five episodes of the BBC children's serial Jackanory.

A second television series, adapted by Keith Waterhouse and Willis Hall, was broadcast in 1978–1981.

A further television derivative was Worzel Gummidge Down Under (1987–89, Channel 4), in which the main character moves to New Zealand.

A new television adaptation, Worzel Gummidge, in 2019 was written and directed by, and starred, Mackenzie Crook.

=== Other books ===
- Poems (1925)
- Hither and Thither (1927)
- Mr Blossom's Shop (Thomas Nelson, publication date unknown; illustrated by E. S. Duffin).

=== Short stories ===
- "A Bunch of Balloons". Cornhill Magazine, May 1926
- "The Vengeance of Vespervigilus". The Sketch, 1 July 1931
- "The Modernist". The Sketch, Christmas Number 1931
- "The Little Wheelbarrow". The Sketch, 7 October 1945
- The Story of Prickles The Hedge-hog (The New Guide Readers, Grade I) (Birmingham: Davis & Moughton Ltd, date unknown)

=== Poetry ===
- "Arachene, the Spider". Cornhill Magazine, March 1926
- "A Wanderer's Song". Cornhill Magazine, May 1928
- "Who Killed Bret Rabbit?". Londonderry Sentinel, 27 December 1928
- "Spring Cleaning". Londonderry Sentinel, 18 April 1931

=== Short articles ===
- "The Making of the Winter-Sportsman". The Sketch, 18 February 1931
- "Ye Olde English - In Foreign Parts". The Sketch, 18 March 1931

== Radio ==
=== Worzel Gummidge ===
- "Worzel Gummidge". BBC Regional Programme, [Daye of broadcast of first episode not yet established to 15 April 1936. Rebroadcast as ‘’The Scarecrow of Scatterbrook"
- "The Scarecrow Party". BBC Regional Programme (The Children's Hour), 1 July 1936
- "Guy and Gummidge". BBC Regional Programme (The Children's Hour), 4 November 1936
- "Gummidge's New Clothes". BBC Regional Programme (The Children's Hour), 18 November 1936
- "Worzel Gummidge Goes Shopping". BBC Home Service (Children's Hour), 5 September 1945
- "Barge Ahoy!". BBC Home Service (Children's Hour), 5 October 1945
- "Sail Along O’ Me". BBC Home Service (Children's Hour), 7 November 1945
- "Worzel Gummidge". BBC Home Service (Children's Hour), 1 December 1945
- "Scairey Gummidge Goes to School". BBC Home Service (Children's Hour), 8 December 1945
- "Worzel Gummidge's Christmas Party". BBC Home Service (Children's Hour), 28 December 1945
- "A Friend for Scairey". BBC Home Service (Children's Hour), 2 February 1946
- "Worzel Gummidge and the Circus". BBC Home Service (Children's Hour), 3 May 1946
- "Worzel Gummidge and the Golden Bird". BBC Home Service (Children's Hour), 1 January 1947
- "Worzel Gummidge and the Treasure Ship". BBC Home Service (Children's Hour), 4 October 1947 to 7 February 1948
- "Worzel Takes Charge". BBC Home Service (Children's Hour), 17 April 1948
- "Scarecrows Alone". BBC Home Service (Children's Hour), 11 December 1948
- "The Scarecrows of Scatterbrook". BBC Home Service (Children's Hour), 8 January to 30 April 1949
- "The Scatterbrook Flower Show". BBC Home Service (Children's Hour), 28 May 1949
- "Worzel Gummidge and the Scarecrow Competition". BBC Home Service (Children's Hour), 25 June 1949
- "Worzel Gummidge on the Island". BBC Home Service (Children's Hour), 8 October 1949 to 4 May 1950
- "The Scarlet Cuckoo: A Worzel Gummidge Play for April Fools’ Day". BBC Home Service (Children's Hour), 1 April 1950
- "Earthy Mangold and Her Friends". BBC Home Service (Children's Hour), 28 December 1945

=== Other ===
- "The Sleeping Beauty". BBC Home Service (Children's Hour), 20 April 1949
- "The Goldfish and the Piano Tuner". BBC Home Service (Children's Hour), 20 July 1949
- "Beauty and the Beast". BBC Home Service (Children's Hour), 16 August 1949
- "Jack and the Beanstalk". BBC Home Service (Children's Hour), 15 November 1949
- "How Far Is It To Bethlehem?". BBC Home Service (Children's Hour), 25 December 1949
- "The Frog Prince". BBC Home Service (Children's Hour), 3 June 1950
- "Rapunzel". BBC Home Service (Children's Hour), 3 November 1950
- "Snow White and Rose Ref". BBC Home Service (Children's Hour), 15 February 1951
- "Little Brother, Little Sister". BBC Home Service (Children's Hour), 25 July 1951
- "The Princess and the Pea". BBC Home Service (Children's Hour), 31 October 1951
- "Toads and Diamonds". BBC Home Service (Children's Hour), 20 February 1952

=== Adaptation for radio ===
- "Worzel Gummidge and Saucy Nancy". Adapted by Geoffrey Dearmer. BBC Home Service (Children's Hour), 16 February - 2 March 1945
- "Worzel Gummidge Takes a Holiday". Adapted by Geoffrey Dearmer. BBC Home Service (Children's Hour), 8 June to 6 July 1945

== Death ==
Barbara Euphan Todd died in 1976 at a nursing home in Donnington, Berkshire. Her stepdaughter, the anthropologist Ursula Betts, remembered her as "warm and kind", but recalled mainly her "dry – and sometimes wry – sense of humour", the hallmark of her Worzel Gummidge books.
