= Willis Hall =

English playwright and writer (1929–2005)

- Hall photographed by Lewis Morley, 1960
- Born: Willis Edward Hall; 6 April 1929; Hunslet, Leeds, England
- Died: 7 March 2005 (aged 75); Ghyll Mews, Ilkley, England
- Occupations: Playwright; screenwriter; author
- Notable work: The Long and the Short and the Tall (1959); Billy Liar (1960); Whistle Down the Wind (Screenplay); A Kind of Loving (1962); Budgie (TV); Worzel Gummidge (TV); Peter Pan: A Musical Adventure (1996)
- Spouses: Kathleen May Cortens (m. 1954); Jill Bennett (m. 1962); Dorothy Kingsmill-Lunn (m. 1966); Valerie Shute (m. 1973)
- Children: 4 sons

Willis Edward Hall (6 April 1929 – 7 March 2005) was an English playwright and radio, television and film writer who drew on his working-class roots in Leeds for much of his writing. Willis formed an extremely prolific partnership with his life-long friend Keith Waterhouse producing over 250 works. He wrote plays such as Billy Liar, The Long and the Short and the Tall, and Celebration; the screenplays for Whistle Down the Wind, A Kind of Loving and Alfred Hitchcock's Torn Curtain; and television programmes including Budgie, Worzel Gummidge and Minder. His passion for musical theatre led to a string of hits, including Wind in the Willows, The Card, and George Stiles' and Anthony Drewe's Peter Pan: A Musical Adventure.

== Early life ==
Born in Hunslet, Leeds, Hall was the only son and elder child of Walter Hall, an engineer's fitter, and his wife, Gladys (née Gibbon). He attended local council schools as well as Cockburn High School. After school, Hall worked in a variety of jobs, including factory worker, trawler hand, and amusement park attendant. Upon reaching the age of eligibility for National service, Hall volunteered for the regular army, where he served as a signals corporal in Malaya. During idle hours there, he wrote plays for Chinese children that were later broadcast on Radio Malaya and designed sets for Singapore Little Theatre.

== Career ==
Hall's military experiences later inspired his first play, The Disciplines of War, about British soldiers ambushed in the Malayan jungle, that premiered on the fringe of the Edinburgh International Festival in August 1957 and was shortly followed by a professional production at the Nottingham Playhouse. After gaining interest from the producer Lindsay Anderson, the play was renamed The Long and the Short and the Tall, and premiered at London's Royal Court Theatre in 1959 starring Peter O'Toole and Robert Shaw. That year it won the Evening Standard's Play of the Year Award, and was later turned into a film version directed by Leslie Norman in 1961 starring Richard Todd, Richard Harris, Laurence Harvey, David McCallum and Ronald Fraser. This was followed by a BBC television series in 1979.

After his success with Anderson at the Royal Court, Hall contacted a boyhood friend, the writer Keith Waterhouse, about adapting his successful novel Billy Liar (1959). Their 1960 play of the same name starred Albert Finney when it premiered in 1960, and played for 582 performances before being taken out on a series of national tours. After this success, in 1963 Hall's and Waterhouse's self-styled company, "Waterhall Productions", adapted the story for the big screen, where it was filmed by John Schlesinger, with Tom Courtenay in the lead role. Under Waterhall's coaxing, the piece also became the long-running Drury Lane musical, Billy (1974), starring Michael Crawford, and a television sitcom of the same name both in Britain (1973–74) and in the United States (1979).

Hall continued this successful partnership with Waterhouse and, over the next 30 years, the two men produced more than 250 scripts for theatre, film, and television including the plays Celebration, Kidnapped at Christmas and All Things Bright and Beautiful, the TV series Worzel Gummidge, Budgie, Minder, The Fuzz, and Secret Army and the screenplays for Whistle Down the Wind, A Kind of Loving and Alfred Hitchcock's Torn Curtain.

Hall also wrote more than a dozen children's books, including a series about a family called the Hollins who meet a vegetarian vampire called The Last Vampire. He also wrote a book, Henry Hollins and the Dinosaur. His membership of The Magic Circle was a source of inspiration for these books. He also wrote radio and television children's plays, as well as contributing to many TV series, including The Return of the Antelope and 'The Royal Astrologer', a collection of separate stories for children relating the adventures of Father Mole-Cricket, his son Master Mole Cricket, and the bad-tempered emperor Indira-Maya who appoints the two as Royal Astrologer and Assistant Royal Astrologer.

A football fan, Hall co-authored Football Classified (1974) with the legendary Michael Parkinson and wrote two football memoirs, My Sporting Life and Football Final (1975).

He wrote a musical about the scarecrow Worzel Gummidge, and others based on the books Treasure Island and The Wind in the Willows. He co-wrote Cameron Mackintosh's stage-musical of Arnold Bennett’s The Card (1973), and adapted Eduardo De Filippo’s plays Saturday, Sunday, Monday (1974) and Filumena (1977) for stage. He also wrote the script for the successful project, Peter Pan: A Musical Adventure (1996).

== Personal life and death ==
He was a greyhound racing enthusiast, and unsuccessful owner. Hall was married four times. His first three marriages to Kathleen May Cortens (m. 1954), actress Jill Bennett (m. 1962), and Dorothy Kingsmill-Lunn (m. 1966), all ended in divorce. On 2 November 1973, Hall married the 28-year-old dancer and actress Valerie Shute, who survived him, along with his four sons. Following a long fight with oesophageal cancer, Hall died at his home in Ghyll Mews, Ilkley in West Yorkshire on 7 March 2005.
