= Billy Liar (disambiguation) =

Billy Liar is a 1959 novel by Keith Waterhouse.

Billy Liar may also refer to:

- Billy Liar (film), a 1963 film directed by John Schlesinger
- Billy Liar (TV series), a 1973–1974 British sitcom
- "Billy Liar" (song), a song by The Decemberists from their 2003 album Her Majesty the Decemberists
- Billy Liar (band), an acoustic punk/folk band
