= Billy Liar =

1959 novel by Keith Waterhouse

- First edition
- Author: Keith Waterhouse
- Language: English
- Publisher: Michael Joseph
- Publication place: United Kingdom
- Media type: Print
- ISBN: 978-0-14-001783-0
- OCLC: 16230170
- Followed by: Billy Liar on the Moon

Billy Liar is a 1959 novel by Keith Waterhouse that was later adapted into a play, a film, a musical and a TV series. The work has inspired and been featured in a number of popular songs.

The semi-comical story is about William Fisher, a working-class young man living with his parents in the fictional town of Stradhoughton in Yorkshire. Bored by his job as a lowly clerk for an undertaker, Billy spends his time indulging in fantasies and dreams of life in London as a comedy writer.

== Synopsis ==
Billy Fisher, the novel's protagonist and narrator, is a young man living with his parents and elderly grandmother in the Yorkshire town of Stradhoughton. He works as a clerk for local undertakers Shadrack and Duxbury, but has a lively imagination and has ambitions of becoming a writer. He has recently submitted some material to a London-based comedian, Danny Boon, and has received a vaguely encouraging response (inviting him to "call in for a chat next time you are in London") that Billy optimistically interprets as an offer of a job as a scriptwriter. Billy has a habit of telling lies – either to evade awkward situations, or simply for his own amusement – which have a tendency to backfire and embroil him in further difficulties. At other times, he finds escape in private fantasies (which he calls "No. 1 thinking"). In particular, he has invented, with a considerable amount of detail, a fictional land named Ambrosia, in which he is a war hero and/or prime minister. Among his other deceits, he had at the end of the previous year failed to post (in order to embezzle the postage money) over 200 promotional calendars for Shadrack and Duxbury. He is still trying to dispose of these.

The story follows events over a single Saturday in September. Billy gets up late (as usual), and faces criticism from his parents and grandmother. He goes to work at Shadrack and Duxbury, where he engages in friendly banter with fellow clerk Arthur Crabtree (including much use of exaggerated Yorkshire dialect), and more antagonistic exchanges with the other clerk, Eric Stamp. Billy and Arthur head out to the Kit-Cat cafe, where they find waitress Rita, to whom Billy had proposed marriage the previous evening. He now gives her an engagement ring – in fact belonging to his longer-term fiancee, Barbara (he has borrowed it back under the pretence that the size needed adjusting). At lunchtime, he meets up with Barbara: she likes to fantasise about their future family life in a cottage in Devon with "little Barbara and little Billy", but resists Billy's more amorous advances. In the afternoon, he returns to the office, despite it being a half-day, as he has submitted a resignation letter, and has a meeting scheduled with Mr Shadrack, one of the partners, to discuss it. Shadrack explains that he is not prepared to accept Billy's resignation until "one or two things" have been cleared up – including the matter of the calendars.

Billy returns home, to be chided by his parents and grandmother for having missed the family lunch. Later, he goes for a walk with Barbara. She is due to visit his home for lunch the following day, so he admits to having told her various lies about his family. He returns to the cafe with Arthur, and now gives Barbara's silver cross pendant to Rita. Billy and Arthur then visit the X-L Disc Bar, a record shop, where they meet Liz, Billy's other love interest, who has been away from Stradhoughton for five weeks.

In the evening, Billy goes to the New House, a pub where he performs a comedy stand-up turn; but his performance falls flat. He moves on to the Roxy, a dance-hall, where Arthur is performing more successfully as the singer with a local band. Billy again meets Liz, and tells her about his plans to move to London. She encourages him to take the plunge. Barbara spots her cross being worn by Rita, and starts an argument. Shadrack, who is also at the Roxy, tells Billy that further issues concerning his work have come to light, and that he is temporarily suspended from his job. There is an announcement over the tannoy system, repeated several times, that Billy is wanted on the telephone, but he ignores it.

Billy walks the streets of Stradhoughton with Liz. She recognises his flaws, but is prepared to tolerate them. At Foley Bottoms, a piece of open land, Liz proposes marriage to Billy, and he cautiously accepts. They make love – only to find they are being spied on by Stamp and two other youths.

Billy and Liz return to the Roxy to retrieve Liz's handbag, but Billy grows bored waiting outside and returns home. There his father tells him that it was he who had been trying to reach Billy by phone. His grandmother has suffered a fit and has been taken to Stradhoughton Infirmary, accompanied by his mother, who wants Billy to join them. Billy's father also reveals that he has found out about the calendars. Billy sets off in a taxi, having packed a suitcase with as many of the calendars as he can manage. At the hospital, he speaks to his mother, and tells her that he is going to London; but she is then called away to be informed that his grandmother has died.

It is now past midnight. Billy heads to the railway station where he buys a single ticket to London. He encounters Liz, who is about to catch a train to Doncaster. He asks her to come and live with him in London. She hints that she might be willing to, on "one condition" (i.e. marriage); but Billy fails to respond. Liz boards her train and leaves. The London train is now preparing to depart. Billy hesitates over whether or not to board it, and in the end cannot bring himself to. He throws the calendars and other evidence of his deceits into a bin, and sets off home.

== Characters ==
- William "Billy" Fisher, the novel's protagonist, a clerk at undertakers Shadrack and Duxbury
- George Fisher, Billy's father, a haulage contractor (removal man)
- Mrs Fisher, Billy's mother
- "Gran", Billy's maternal grandmother
- Arthur Crabtree, another clerk at Shadrack and Duxbury, and Billy's best friend
- Eric Stamp, the third clerk at Shadrack and Duxbury, with whom Billy has a more fraught relationship
- Mr Shadrack, one of the partners at Shadrack and Duxbury, aged about 25, with entrepreneurial ambitions to modernise the firm
- Councillor Duxbury, the other, more elderly, partner at Shadrack and Duxbury
- Barbara (nicknamed "the Witch" by Billy), one of Billy's fiancees
- Rita, a blonde and outspoken waitress, another of Billy's fiancees
- Liz (nicknamed "Woodbine Lizzy" by Stamp), Billy's true soulmate

== Adaptations ==
=== Stage play ===
In 1960, the novel's author, Keith Waterhouse, co-wrote a three-act stage version with Willis Hall. The action took place on a single set combining the living-room, hallway, and porch of the Fisher household. The first production opened in the West End of London with Albert Finney in the title role. It has since been produced all over the world, and has become a favourite with amateur groups. The play was adapted for the Irish stage as Liam Liar by Hugh Leonard in 1976.

Like the novel, the play is set over one Saturday: Act 1 in the morning, Act 2 in the early evening, and Act 3 at night.

=== Film ===
The 1963 film was directed by John Schlesinger and featured Tom Courtenay, who played the part when Albert Finney left the cast in the West End play, as Billy and Julie Christie as Liz, one of his three girlfriends. Mona Washbourne played Mrs. Fisher, and Wilfred Pickles played Mr. Fisher. Rodney Bewes, Finlay Currie, and Leonard Rossiter also had roles.

=== British television series ===
The novel was also used as the basis for a sitcom made by London Weekend Television in 1973–1974, starring Jeff Rawle as Billy. The series was scripted by the play's writers, Waterhouse and Hall, and the action was updated to the 1970s. George A. Cooper reprised his West End role as Billy's father. Other regular cast members included Pamela Vezey as Alice, Colin Jeavons as Shadrack, May Warden as Billy's grandmother, and Sally Watts as Barbara. Several new girlfriends were also introduced.

The series was shown on the Seven Network in Australia during the non-ratings season of 1975–1976, shown on CBC Television in Canada in 1975–1976, and shown on RTÉ 2 in Ireland in 1982. It has never been rerun, although the first series was released on Region 2 DVD in August 2006. The second series was released in March 2007. The complete series was released on 07/05/2018.

=== Stage musical ===
In 1974, a successful West End musical (entitled simply Billy) starred Michael Crawford and, in her West End debut, Elaine Paige. The cast also included Gay Soper, Avis Bunnage, Bryan Pringle and Lockwood West. The book was by well-known British sitcom writers Dick Clement and Ian La Frenais, and the music and lyrics were by film composer John Barry and Don Black respectively.

=== American television series ===
An American adaptation entitled Billy and starring Steve Guttenberg, Peggy Pope, and James Gallery aired briefly on CBS in 1979.

== Sequel ==
Waterhouse subsequently wrote a sequel, Billy Liar on the Moon, published in 1975. This returns to the life of Billy Fisher, now aged 33, married, and living in the Midlands. He continues to indulge in a fantasy life, and to engage in various deceits which have a tendency to backfire and land him in further trouble.

== In popular culture ==
- Billy Liar is the name of an acoustic folk/punk singer from Scotland, and of his eponymous band.
- "Billy Liar" by The Decemberists appears on Her Majesty the Decemberists and was later released as a single.
- Saint Etienne sampled some lines from the film in their song "You're in a Bad Way".
- The music video for the song "The Importance of Being Idle" by Oasis contains scenes based on scenes from Billy Liar, although most of it is based on the video for the Kinks' Dead End Street.
- The Kids in the Hall "Billy Dreamer" character is based loosely on Billy Liar.
- The song "William, It Was Really Nothing" by The Smiths took inspiration from the book.
- Manchester singer-songwriter Vinny Peculiar included a track on his 2026 album "The Curse Of You Know Who" entitled "Billy Liar"
- Indie band Ride included a track on their 1992 album "Going Blank Again" called "Twisterella" , which was named after a song from the 1963 film Billy Liar as the two contain the same chord structure. The song is led by Mark Gardener, but Andy Bell sings the line "look at Twisterella, she hasn't got a fella", taken from the movie, over the outro.

== See also ==
- Walter Mitty, the fantasist character in James Thurber's 1939 short story.
