= Billy Liar (TV series) =

British television series

Cover for the DVD

Billy Liar is a sitcom of 26 30-minute episodes over two series made by London Weekend Television in 1973–1974 which starred Jeff Rawle as Billy Fisher. In addition there was a short five-minute long special as part of the All Star Comedy Carnival broadcast on 25 December 1973.

The semi-comical premise is based around William Fisher, a Northern working-class 19-year-old living with his parents and grandmother in the fictional town of Stradhoughton in Yorkshire. Bored by his job as a lowly clerk for Shadrack, an undertaker, and just as bored at home Billy spends his time indulging in fantasies and dreams of life in the big city as a comedy writer.

The series was based on the 1959 semi-autobiographical novel Billy Liar by Keith Waterhouse, which was later adapted into a play, a film, a musical and finally into the TV series. The scripts were by the play's writers, Keith Waterhouse and Willis Hall, with the story being updated to the 1970s. The theme was sung by Peter Skellern. George A. Cooper reprised his West End role as Billy's father. Other regular cast members included Pamela Vezey as Alice, Colin Jeavons as Shadrack, May Warden as Billy's grandmother, and Sally Watts as Barbara. Several new girlfriends were also introduced. Guest appearances were made by Thora Hird, Windsor Davies, Mollie Sugden, Magnus Magnusson, Kathy Staff and Roy Kinnear, among others.

The series was rerun on television in 1978/1979. The first series was released on Region 2 DVD in August 2006. The second series was released in March 2007. The complete series was released in May 2018. The series Billy Liar was shown on the Seven Network in Australia during the non-ratings season of 1975–1976, on CBC Television in Canada in 1975–1976, and on RTÉ 2 in Ireland in 1982.

An American adaptation entitled Billy and starring Steve Guttenberg, Peggy Pope, and James Gallery aired briefly on CBS in 1979.

== Cast ==
- Billy Fisher - Jeff Rawle
- Geoffrey Fisher- George A. Cooper
- Alice Fisher - Pamela Vezey
- Mr Shadrack - Colin Jeavons
- Billy's grandmother - May Warden
- Barbara - Sally Watts

== Episode guide ==
=== Series one (1973) ===
No.	Title	Written by	Original release date
1	"Billy and the Party Spirit"	Keith Waterhouse and Willis Hall	26 October 1973
To escape the humdrum boredom of working for an undertaker, Billy Fisher escapes into a fantasy world, which irritates and annoys his father.
2	"Billy and the French Connection"	Keith Waterhouse and Willis Hall	2 November 1973
Billy's girlfriend Barbara is an art student at Stradhoughton Art School. As far as Billy is concerned, painting means Paris and Paris means France, so his fantasies take on a distinctly romantic tone.
3	"Billy and the Lost Weekend"	Keith Waterhouse and Willis Hall	9 November 1973
For Billy, a cultural weekend in Stratford-Upon-Avon doesn't mean having to watch Shakespeare. After persuading his parents to let his fiancée Barbara join them on the trip he is disappointed when she insists on separate rooms.
4	"Billy and the Monster"	Keith Waterhouse and Willis Hall	16 November 1973
Billy's father gets sick and tired of Billy's obsession with making model dinosaurs. However, in Billy's fantasy, the prehistoric creatures take on truly monstrous dimensions.
5	"Billy and the Cornish Spirit"	Keith Waterhouse and Willis Hall	23 November 1973
When Billy obtains a model of Concorde his fantasy involves him as a wartime bomber pilot. However, he comes down to earth with a bump when he encounters a freaked out hippy on his way to joining a commune in Cornwall.
6	"Billy and the Freudian Slip"	Keith Waterhouse and Willis Hall	30 November 1973
Billy's parents in collusion with Mr. Shadrack send him to see a psychiatrist, but it turns out that perhaps Dr. Smiley has similar issues of his own.
7	"Billy and the Night In"	Keith Waterhouse and Willis Hall	7 December 1973
When Billy and Barbara offer to look after his difficult Grandmother so that his parents can go to the pub for a night out it transpires that Billy has other things on his mind rather than keeping Grandmother company.
8	"Billy and the Long Lunch"	Keith Waterhouse and Willis Hall	14 December 1973
Billy's plan is plain and simple - to take Barbara for a liquid lunch and then see her home and invite her to have a lie down on the sofa. However, things don't follow Billy's plan.
9	"Billy and the Gift Of The Magi"	Keith Waterhouse and Willis Hall	21 December 1973
Billy is determined that he wants a pair of bright yellow trousers for Christmas. However, firstly he can't afford them and secondly his father is just as determined that Billy won't get such hideous attire.
10	"Billy and the Au Pair"	Keith Waterhouse and Willis Hall	28 December 1973
Barbara wants to redecorate their new bathroom and reads House and Home for ideas. However, Billy is more interested in what's in his own glossy magazine.
11	"Billy and the Key Of The Door"	Keith Waterhouse and Willis Hall	4 January 1974
When Billy's parents are away from home overnight to attend his uncle's funeral his father is concerned about leaving Billy in charge of his Grandmother. Things go from bad to worse when Billy is also left in charge of the undertaker's shop by Mr. Shadrack
12	"Billy and Pandora's Box"	Keith Waterhouse and Willis Hall	11 January 1974
Billy manages to keep his sticky fingers a secret until his parents find the key to his secret store cupboard. The cupboard's strange contents lead to a series of unforeseen events.
13	"Billy and the Alter Ego"	Keith Waterhouse and Willis Hall	18 January 1974
Billy's 'twin brother' Boris is the opposite to Billy in every way, being mature, ruthlessly successful, wealthy but also compassionate. Of course, Billy's various girlfriends are keen to meet 'Boris'.

=== Christmas special (1973) ===
Billy Liar featured as a short five-minute-long special as part of the All Star Comedy Carnival on 25 December 1973, an annual Christmas-special containing new mini-episodes of popular British sitcoms.

=== Series two (1974) ===
No.	Title	Written by	Original release date
1	"Billy And The Matrimonial Stakes"	Keith Waterhouse and Willis Hall	13 September 1974
When his fiancée Barbara starts to make wedding plans Billy's already overactive imagination goes into overdrive.
2	"Billy And The Muse Of Fire"	Keith Waterhouse and Willis Hall	20 September 1974
Oswald, Mr. Shadrack's nephew, joins the team at the funeral parlour, but he and Billy do not get along.
3	"Billy And A Birthday"	Keith Waterhouse and Willis Hall	27 September 1974
When Billy is disappointed at receiving boring presents for his birthday his fiancée Barbara organises a quiet evening alone together. However, things look up with the arrival of Sheila.
4	"Billy And The Bed-Sit"	Keith Waterhouse and Willis Hall	4 October 1974
When Billy become a lodger at the home of Miss Duggins he quickly learns that her house rules do not fit in with his own plans.
5	"Billy And A Little Learning"	Keith Waterhouse and Willis Hall	11 October 1974
After reading an advert in the local paper Billy becomes determined on a career in publishing. While Mr Shadrack and his parents try to put him off a career change Billy ignores them and goes to the interview and gets the position. However, it turns out the 'job in publishing' is actually selling encyclopaedias door-to-door, which isn't exactly legal.
6	"Billy And The New Life"	Keith Waterhouse and Willis Hall	18 October 1974
Billy has a new secret girlfriend - Alison - whose hobby is collecting engagement rings. The problem is Billy's ring is still on the finger of his fiancée, Barbara.
7	"Billy And The Food Of Love"	Keith Waterhouse and Willis Hall	25 October 1974
When Billy announces that he has been taking piano lessons for the last 6 months his family are impressed - apart from his, who doubts if Billy can play at all. While it is true that Billy has been going to a piano teacher all the time he never learned to actually play as during every 'lesson' he has been playing draughts with the old man hoping to be left a legacy when he dies. Things go terribly wrong when a piano is delivered to the house and his family urge him to play it.
8	"Billy And Some Oriental Philosophy"	Keith Waterhouse and Willis Hall	1 November 1974
Billy becomes engrossed in the television series Kung Fu, and in his imagination, he becomes Caine, the series' hero'. After delivering a kung fu blow to an expensive urn at the funeral parlour and smashing it Billy is suspended without pay. Now having time to look after his Grandmother he makes sure she gets to hospital for her appointment, but here his imagination runs away with him, taking with it his Grandmother's wheelchair.
9	"Billy and the Scales Of Justice"	Keith Waterhouse and Willis Hall	8 November 1974
When Billy is summoned for jury service his father is concerned that Billy will let the family down through his lack of knowledge, so his father mounts a mock trial in the living room so that Billy can learn about British justice.
10	"Billy and the Bedside Manner"	Keith Waterhouse and Willis Hall	15 November 1974
After Billy's father catches a chill and goes back to bed Billy's mother calls the doctor. As Billy eavesdrops on the conversation he misunderstands the doctor's comments.
11	"Billy and a Temporary Position"	Keith Waterhouse and Willis Hall	22 November 1974
When Mr. Shadrack sacks Billy for incompetence Billy quickly learns that being fired isn't so bad after all.
12	"Billy and Some Orange Blossom"	Keith Waterhouse and Willis Hall	29 November 1974
While Billy usually manages to keep his fantasies to himself when stately and middle-aged Evangeline Tupper arrives at the office of Mr. Shadrack Billy wrongly imagines the two of them being together.
13	"Billy And A Missing Item"	Keith Waterhouse and Willis Hall	6 December 1974
When Billy's father decides to wallpaper the living room he expects everyone to help out - including his lazy son. However, Billy has other plans about how to spend his time.
