= Billy (1979 TV series) =

- Genre: Sitcom
- Based on: Billy Liar by Keith Waterhouse & Willis Hall
- Directed by: John Rich
- Starring: Steve Guttenberg; Peggy Pope; James Gallery; Paula Trueman; Michael Alaimo; Bruce Talkington
- Opening theme: "You Could Be The Only One" performed by Ray Kennedy
- Composer: Earle Hagen
- Country of origin: United States
- Original language: English
- No. of seasons: 1
- No. of episodes: 7

Production
- Producer: John Rich
- Running time: 30 minutes
- Production companies: John Rich Productions; 20th Century Fox Television

Original release
- Network: CBS
- Release: February 26 – April 28, 1979

Billy is an American sitcom that aired on CBS from February 26 to April 28, 1979. The series was based on Keith Waterhouse and Willis Hall's 1960 British play Billy Liar and their 1973-74 TV series of the same name.

== Synopsis ==
Billy stars Steve Guttenberg as Billy Fisher, a mortician's clerk with a tendency to daydream. His Walter Mitty-like tendency would have him imagining that he was a famous surgeon, a rock superstar, a disk jockey, a television network executive, or a football star. Each episode of Billy had at least two of his fantasies, which included appearances by Don Adams, Suzanne Somers, Larry Csonka, Merv Griffin, and Lou Ferrigno.

Peggy Pope and James Gallery portray Billy's often-frustrated parents (she thought Billy had a vivid imagination; he viewed Billy as a chronic, compulsive liar). Paula Trueman played his grandmother, who believed that Billy was insane, Bruce Talkington played Billy's friend Arthur Milliken, a fellow worker at Shadrack and Shadrack funeral home and Michael Alaimo as Billy's employer.

== Reception ==
Billy replaced Co-Ed Fever in CBS' Monday night lineup during February 1979, when the latter series was cancelled after one episode. Billy did only slightly better and was cancelled two months later, its last episode broadcast by CBS on April 28, 1979. It ranked 76th out of 114 shows that season, with an average 15.0/24 rating/share.

== Episodes ==
No.	Title	Original release date
1	"Pilot"	February 26, 1979
2	"My Son the Doctor"	March 5, 1979
3	"Showbiz"	March 12, 1979
4	"Computer Dating"	March 24, 1979
5	"Fathers and Sons"	March 31, 1979
6	"Disco"	April 21, 1979
7	"Dream Date"	April 28, 1979

== Bibliography ==
- Tim Brooks and Earle Marsh, The Complete Directory to Prime Time Network and Cable TV Shows 1946–Present, Ninth edition (New York: Ballantine Books, 2007) ISBN 978-0-345-49773-4
- Michael Ausiello, TV Guide: Guide to TV, (New York: Barnes & Noble, 2005) ISBN 0-7607-7572-9
