= Everything Must Go (novel) =

1969 novel by Keith Waterhouse

- First edition (US)
- Author: Keith Waterhouse
- Language: English
- Genre: Comedy
- Publisher: Putnam (New York)
- Publication date: 1969
- Publication place: United Kingdom
- Media type: Print

Everything Must Go (published in the UK as The Bucket Shop) is a 1969 novel by the British writer Keith Waterhouse. Similar in theme to the plot of his earlier Billy Liar, a man working as an antique dealer lives out his daydreams but ends up finding himself in a horrible predicament.

== Bibliography ==
- Weintraub, Stanley. British Dramatists Since World War II: M-Z. Gale Research Company, 1982.
