= Michael Alaimo (actor) =

American actor (1938–2025)

- Alaimo in The Kentucky Fried Movie, 1977
- Born: Michael Lawrence Alaimo; November 19, 1938; Brooklyn, New York, U.S.
- Died: May 2, 2025 (aged 86); Burbank, California, U.S.
- Education: Brooklyn College
- Occupations: Film, stage and television actor

Michael Lawrence Alaimo (November 19, 1938 – May 2, 2025) was an American film, stage and television actor.

== Life and career ==
Alaimo was born in Brooklyn, New York, the son of Frank and Isabelle Alaimo. He attended Brooklyn College, studying theatre. He acted at the New York Shakespeare Festival from 1961 to 1964. He began his screen career in 1964, appearing in the film Hamlet. In 1966, he appeared in the film The Love Merchant.

Later in his career, Alaimo made his television debut in the CBS detective television series Barnaby Jones. In 1979, he starred as the title character's employer Norval Shadrack in the CBS sitcom television series Billy, starring along with Steve Guttenberg, James Gallery, Peggy Pope, Paula Trueman and Bruce Talkington. He guest-starred in numerous television programs including Barney Miller, Lou Grant, The Six Million Dollar Man, Eight Is Enough, Dynasty, Hill Street Blues, Cheers, The Paper Chase, Night Court and The Drew Carey Show. He also appeared in numerous films such as The China Syndrome, Space Jam, Mr. Mom, All I Want for Christmas, She's Out of Control and The Kentucky Fried Movie.

Alaimo retired from acting in 2018, last appearing in the film Frank & Ava.

== Death ==
Alaimo died on May 2, 2025, at his home in Burbank, California, at the age of 86.
