= Gertan Klauber =

Czech-born British actor (1932–2008)

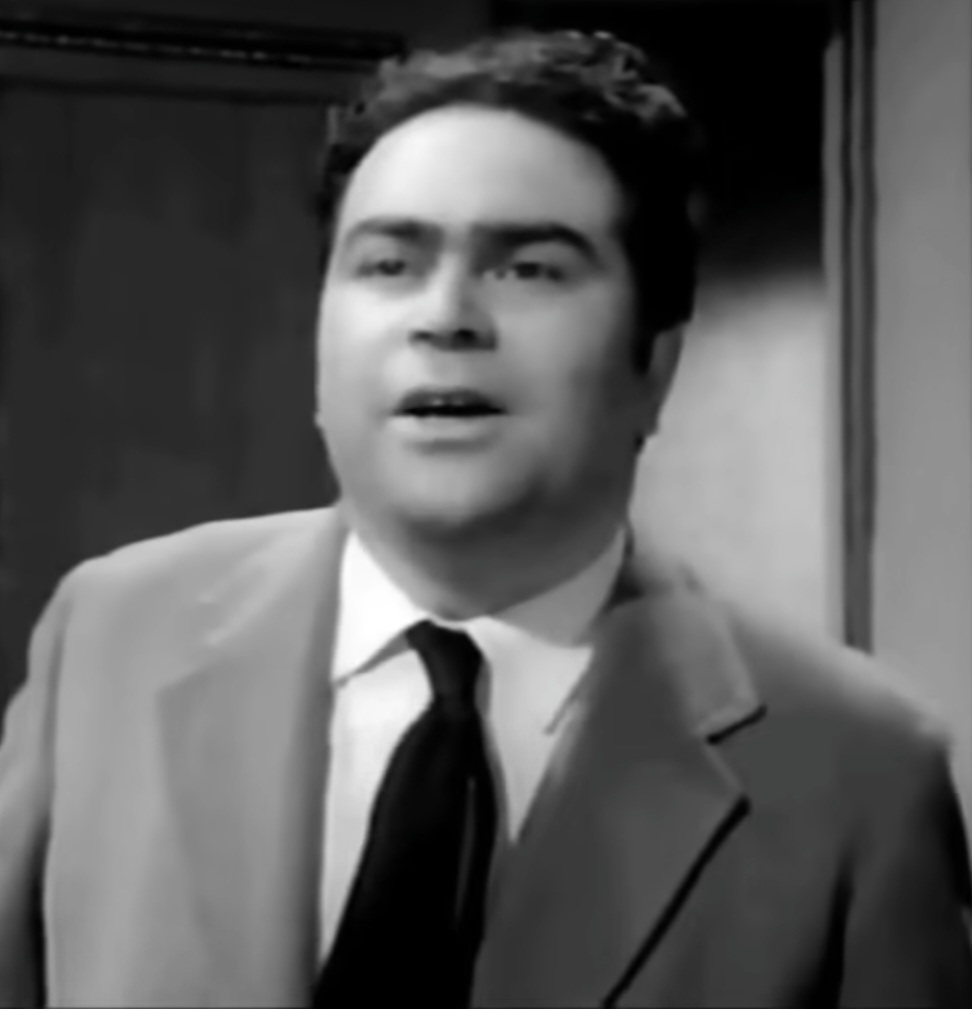
- Klauber in the TV series One Step Beyond, episode The Villa
- Born: 5 March 1932; Czechoslovakia
- Died: 1 August 2008 (aged 76); London, England
- Education: Birmingham School of Acting
- Occupation: Actor
- Spouse: Gwendolyn Watts (m. 1959; died 2000)
- Children: 2
- Relatives: Sally Watts (sister-in-law)

George Gertan Klauber (5 March 1932 – 1 August 2008) was a Czech-born British actor, known for playing various character parts in films and television programmes, particularly the Carry On comedies.

== Early life ==
Of Sudeten German and Jewish descent, Klauber was born in Czechoslovakia in 1932, and moved to the United Kingdom prior to the outbreak of World War II. He studied drama at the Birmingham School of Acting (now the Royal Birmingham Conservatoire).

== Career ==
=== Theatre ===
Klauber appeared on stage for the Royal Shakespeare Company and the National Theatre. He acted in Peter Hall's 1957 West End production of Tennessee Williams' Camino Real, and played opposite Glenda Jackson in All Kinds of Men. He played the Tartar opposite Nicol Williamson and Prunella Scales in the RSC's 1962 production of The Lower Depths.

=== Television ===
He appeared in numerous television productions, often playing minor villains, including episodes of The Saint, The Professionals, Danger Man, The Avengers, twice in Doctor Who as The Galley Master in The Romans and as Ola in The Macra Terror and as mad king George III in Blackadder the Third. He appeared in the TV musical Pickwick for the BBC in 1969. He also played a servile yet pompous waiter in one episode, "The Old Magic", of Whatever Happened to the Likely Lads?.

=== Film ===
Klauber was one of the regular recurring cast members of the Carry On films, appearing in seven films total (one uncredited). He usually played small roles, cast when the producers wanted someone big and sinister, or big and jovial, but had a prominent part as 'Marcus' in Carry On Cleo (1964).

He appeared in two James Bond films: Octopussy (1983) and The Living Daylights (1987), though he was uncredited for the latter.

His last film role was as a pimp in the Beatles biopic Backbeat (1994).

== Personal life ==
Klauber was married to the actress Gwendolyn Watts from 1959 until her death in 2000. They had two children.

=== Death ===
Klauber died in London at the age of 76 on 1 August 2008. His cause of death was not disclosed.

== Partial filmography ==
- Battle of the V-1 (1958) - SS Guard - Stefan at Dentist (uncredited)
- Don't Panic Chaps! (1959) - Schmidt
- Beyond the Curtain (1960) - Reception Clerk (uncredited)
- The Hands of Orlac (1960) - Fairground attendant (uncredited)
- The Breaking Point (1961) - Lofty
- Three on a Spree (1961) - Joe
- The Kitchen (1961) - Gaston
- The Pursuers (1961) - Bernstein
- Hot Enough for June (1964) - Technician in Czech Glass Factory
- Carry On Spying (1964) - Code Clerk
- Carry On Cleo (1964) - Marcus
- Operation Crossbow (1965) - Security Guard at Rocket Plant (uncredited)
- Dateline Diamonds (1965) - Meverhof
- The Big Job (1965) - Milkman
- The Deadly Affair (1966) - Businessman (uncredited)
- Follow That Camel (1967) - Algerian Spiv (uncredited)
- Carry On Doctor (1967) - Wash Orderly
- Vendetta for the Saint (1969) - Renato
- Before Winter Comes (1969) - Russian Major
- Scream and Scream Again (1970) - Border Guard (uncredited)
- Cry of the Banshee (1970) - Tavern Keeper
- Wuthering Heights (1970)
- Venom (aka The Legend of Spider Forest) (1971) - Kurt
- Carry On Henry (1971) - Bidet
- Our Miss Fred (1972) - German Officer (uncredited)
- The Pied Piper (1972) - Town Cryer
- Up the Front (1972) - Donner
- Carry On Abroad (1972) - Postcard Seller
- Soft Beds, Hard Battles (1974) - 3rd Gestapo Agent
- Percy's Progress (1974) - Pablo
- Upstairs, Downstairs (1974, Episode: "The Beastly Hun") - Albert Schoenfeld
- Operation: Daybreak (1975) - Kubelwagen Driver (uncredited)
- The Seven-Per-Cent Solution (1976) - The Pasha
- Carry On Emmannuelle (1978) - German Soldier
- Bad Timing (1980) - Ambulance Man
- Octopussy (1983) - Bubi
- Top Secret! (1984) - Mayor of Berlin
- The Living Daylights (1987) - Fairground Cafe Owner (uncredited)
- Blackadder the Third (1987, Episode 6: "Duel and Duality") - King George III, a mad monarch
- Jack the Ripper (1988) - Diemschutz
- Backbeat (1994) - Pimp
