= Mary Barton (TV series) =

British television series

- Genre: Drama
- Based on: Mary Barton by Elizabeth Gaskell
- Written by: Elaine Morgan
- Directed by: Michael Imison
- Starring: Lois Daine; George A. Cooper; Cyril Luckham
- Composer: Dudley Simpson
- Country of origin: United Kingdom
- Original language: English
- No. of series: 1
- No. of episodes: 4

Production
- Producer: Douglas Allen
- Running time: 35 minutes
- Production company: BBC

Original release
- Network: BBC Two
- Release: 20 June – 11 July 1964

Mary Barton is a British four-part historical drama television series which originally aired on BBC 2 in 1964. It is based on the 1848 novel of the same title by Elizabeth Gaskell.

== Cast ==
- Lois Daine as Mary Barton
- George A. Cooper as John Barton
- Cyril Luckham as Mr Carson
- Linda Marlowe as Sophy Carson
- Barry Warren as Jem Wilson
- Gwendolyn Watts as Margaret Legh
- Joe Gladwin as Job Legh
- Clare Kelly as Jane Wilson
- Elsie Wagstaff as Aunt Alice
- Peter Ashcroft as Charley Jones
- Reg Lever as Parker
- Eileen Dale as Mrs Carson
- Kenneth Laird as Sgt Wilkinson
- Brian Peck as Will
- Bernard Severn as Seaton
- Patrick Mower as Harry Carson
- Jean Alexander as Mrs Jones
- Jack Allen as Duncombe
- Michael Bird as Gardener
- Frank Crawshaw as Bridgenorth
- John Dawson as Superintendent
- Fred Ferris as Hargreaves
- Jack Lester as Hume
- John Barrett as George Wilson
- George Betton as Boatman
- John Bosch as Young Boy
- Ogilvie Crombie as Judge
- Donald Eccles as Clinton
- Maxwell Foster as Lord John Russell
- Patrick Godfrey as Williams
- Martin Heller as Court Usher
- Alan Lake as Knobstick
- Howard Lockhart as Clerk of the Court
- Jean Marlow as Parlourmaid
- John McKelvey as Doctor
- Douglas Murchie as Captain
- Graham Rigby as Duerden
- William Sherwood as Daniel O'Connell
- Jane Tann as Mrs Davenport

== Bibliography ==
- Baskin, Ellen . Serials on British Television, 1950-1994. Scolar Press, 1996.
