= Michael Oblowitz =

South African filmmaker (born 1952)

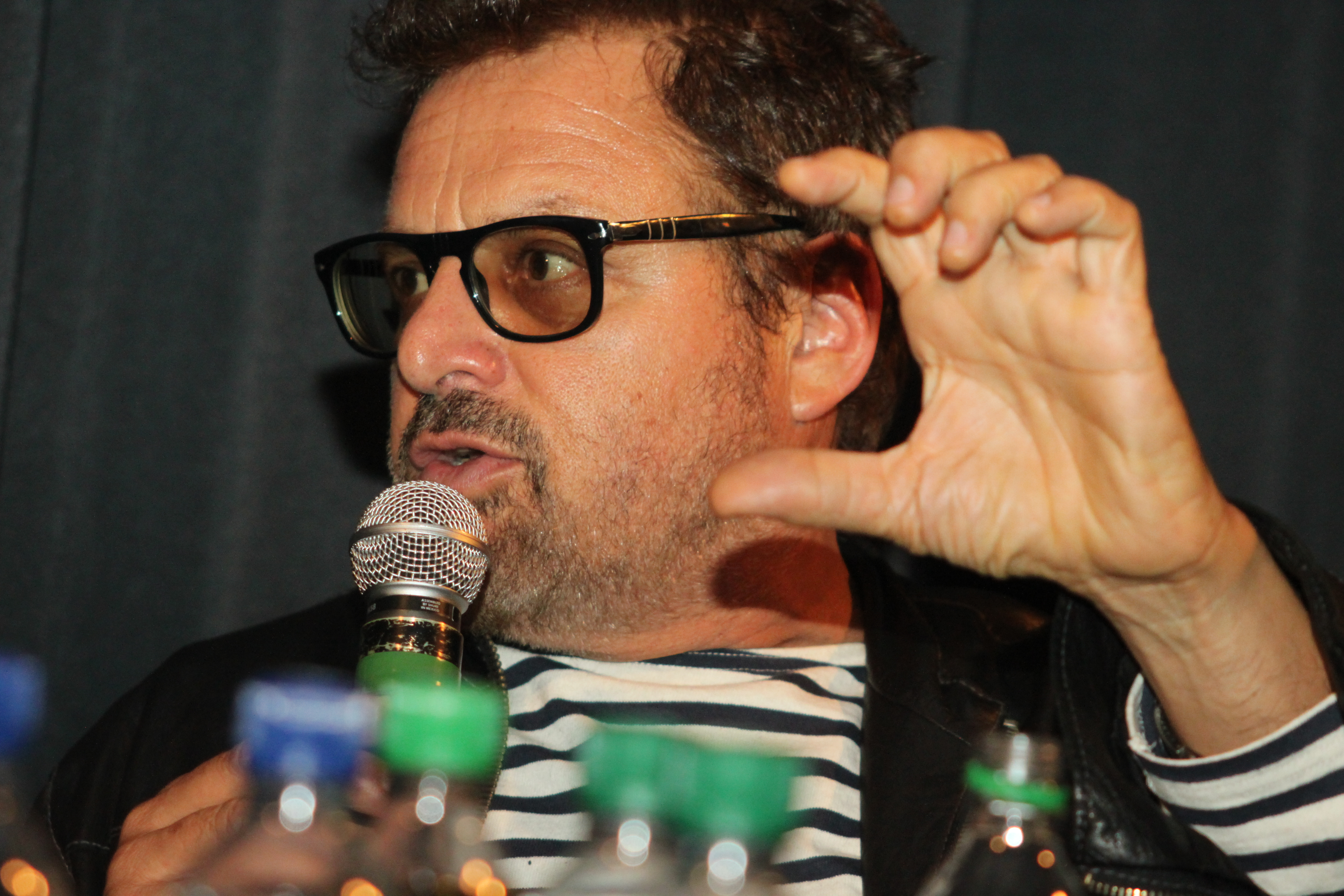
- Michael Oblowitz at the Hof International Film Festival in October 2013
- Born: 1952 (age 73–74); Cape Town, South Africa
- Education: University of Cape Town, Columbia University
- Known for: Filmmaking
- Movement: No wave
- Website: michaeloblowitz.com.

Michael Oblowitz is a South African filmmaker. His career has spanned almost five decades. He was a member of the No Wave Cinema movement of independent filmmaking in New York City in the late 1970s. He is also the first South African filmmaker to receive entries to both Cannes Film Festival and Sundance Film Festival, respectively.

== Early life and education ==
Oblowitz was born in Cape Town, where he grew up surfing in the 1970s. He is a Fine Arts and Philosophy graduate of the University of Cape Town. He later received an M.F.A. in Film Theory and Production from Columbia University in 1982, and studied color photography and printing at the Central School of Art London in 1976.

== Career ==
He began his career in the mid-1970s with the independent films X-Terminator, The Is/Land, Minus Zero and King Blank. The films are now part of the permanent collection of the Museum of Modern Art in New York City.

As well as shooting his own films, he served as cinematographer for a wide array of No Wave Cinema personnel during his time in New York. Select notable filmmakers he worked with included Rosa von Praunheim, Tina L'Hotsky and Maripol.

By 1977, he was also working as a photographer for SoHo News. Whilst working for the newspaper, he shot portraits of legendary musicians Bryan Ferry and Plastic Bertrand.

He entered mainstream filmmaking in 1997, with the crime drama film This World, Then the Fireworks. In October 2010, his film The Traveller, starring Val Kilmer, was released in the United States. It won an award for Best Thriller Feature at the 2011 New York International Independent Film & Video Festival.

He released his first surfing documentary, Sea Of Darkness, in 2010. The documentary won the Best Feature award at the New York Surf Film Festival. His second surfing documentary, Heavy Water, which was released in 2017 starred Nathan Fletcher, won Best surfing film at the Byron Bay International Film Festival and won Best Wavescape film at the 2018 Durban International Film Festival. In 2018, he directed the film Frank & Ava.

He has also produced music videos for stars such as David Bowie and Diana Ross. The first music video he directed was Kurtis Blow's Basketball. The video broke barriers, being one of the first Hip-Hop music videos to air on MTV.

== Notable films ==
- X-Terminator (1977)
- Minus Zero (1979)
- King Blank (1982)
- This World, Then the Fireworks (1997)
- Sea of Darkness (Documentary, 2010)
- The Traveler (2010)
- The Ganzfeld Experiment (2013)
- Heavy Water (2017)
- Frank & Ava (2018)

== Music videos ==
- "Basketball" by Kurtis Blow (1984)
- "Hippy Land Rap" by Tommy Chong (1990)
- "The Healer" by John Lee Hooker and Carlos Santana (1993)
- "Mustang Sally" by Buddy Guy and Jeff Beck (1994)
- Booker T and the M.G's Live in Laguna (music documentary, 1995)
- Buddy Guy - Live: The Real Deal (music documentary, 1996)
- "Standing Here" by The Stone Roses (1997)

== Selected filmography ==
- 1977 X-Terminator (short film)
- 1977 Table Conversation (short film)
- 1977 Portrait of Tina L’Hotsky (short film)
- 1977 Snow (short film)
- 1978 The Is/Land-Circuits of Control (with David Goldberg)
- 1979 Minus Zero
- 1979 Death Magazine
- 1979 Red Love Color
- 1980 Too Sensitive to Touch (with Sylvère Lotringer)
- 1982 King Blank
- 1998 The Areola (co-directed)
- 2001 The Breed
- 2003 Out for a Kill
- 2003 The Foreigner
- 2005 Hammerhead: Shark Frenzy
- 2008 Romantic Resorts
- 2016 Untitled Sunny Garcia Documentary (in production)
- 2023 Confidential Informant

== Awards and recognitions ==
Year	Award Ceremony	Category	Nominated work	Result	Ref.
2017	Byron Bay International Film Festival	Best Surf Film	Heavy Water	Won	
2018	Durban International Film Festival	Best Wavescape Film	Heavy Water	Won	
2018	Hollywood Reel Independent Film Festival	Best Independent Film	Frank & Ava	Won	
