= Jeff Rawle =

English actor (born 1951)

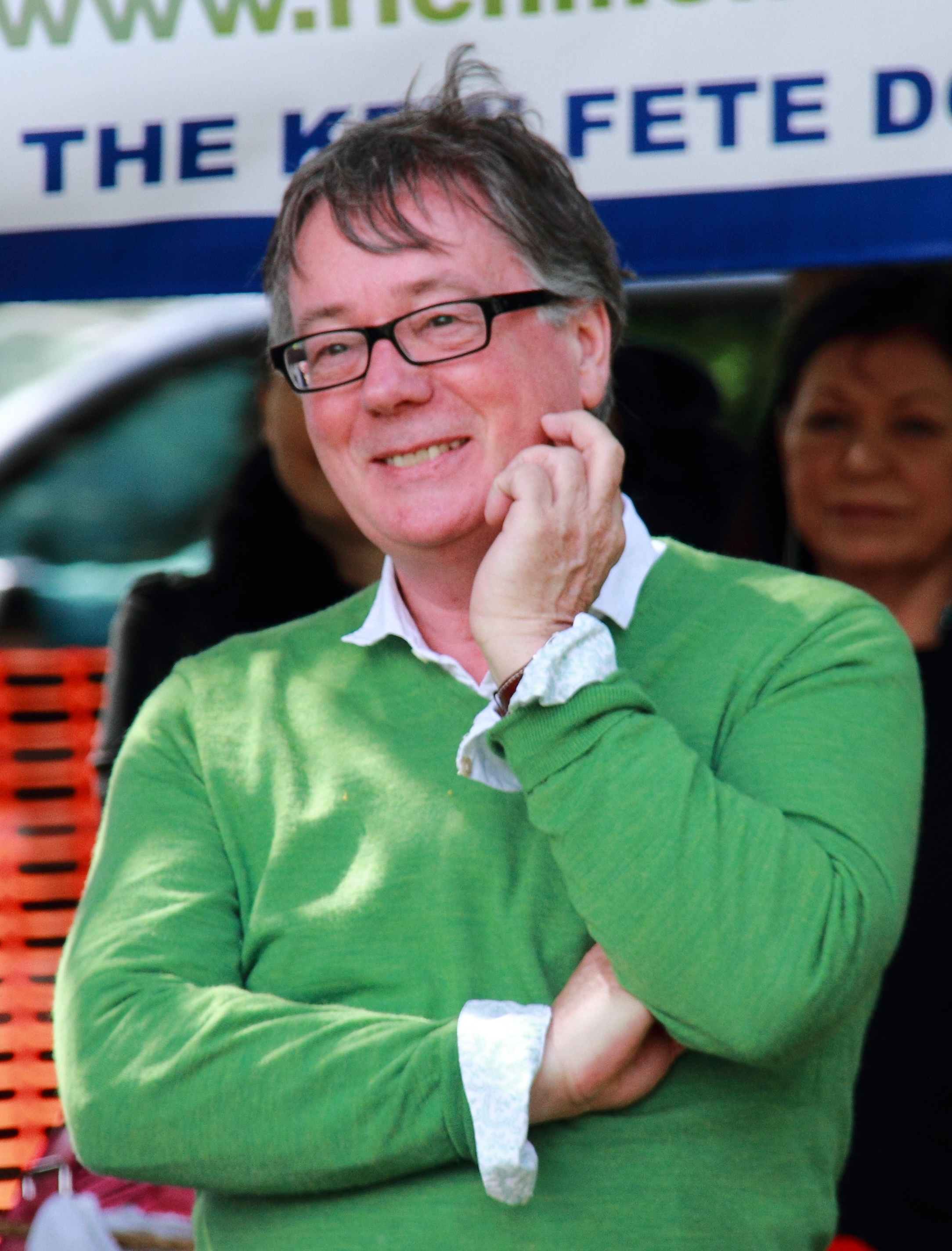
- Rawle in 2011
- Born: Jeffrey Alan Rawle; 20 July 1951 (age 75); Birmingham, England
- Occupation: Actor
- Years active: 1973–present
- Spouse: Nina Marc (m. 1998)
- Children: 2

Jeffrey Alan Rawle (born 20 July 1951) is a British actor. He is known for playing Billy in Billy Liar (1973–1974), and for portraying George Dent in the news-gathering sitcom Drop the Dead Donkey (1990–1998), and Silas Blissett in Hollyoaks (2010–2022). Other credits include Minder (1993), Doc Martin (2004), Harry Potter and the Goblet of Fire (2005), Grantchester (2023), and Beyond Paradise (2024).

== Early life ==
Rawle was born on 20 July 1951, in Birmingham. His first secondary school was King Edward VI School in Aston, Birmingham. When he was 15, his family moved to Sheffield, and it was at High Storrs Grammar School that he first became interested in drama when he appeared in school plays. He worked at the Sheffield Playhouse before training at LAMDA.

== Career ==
Rawle landed his first significant role in 1973 as the protagonist in the television version of Keith Waterhouse and Willis Hall's Billy Liar. He played Billy Fisher for two seasons, 26 episodes from 1973 to 1974.

In 1979, he appeared as Rudy with Ian McKellen and Tom Bell in the premiere production of Bent at the Royal Court Theatre, London. In 1984, he appeared in the story Frontios as the character Plantaganet in Doctor Who. In 1980, he appeared in the Hammer House of Horror, episode "Charlie Boy." In 1981, he appeared in an episode of Juliet Bravo. In 1983, He starred as Jeff Harris in three episodes of Angels and appeared in Bergerac (1983).

In 1989, he starred as W.O. Wilson in the three-part miniseries Vote for Them, which was about allied troops still based in Cairo in 1943. He appeared in Minder (1993) and Faith in the Future on ITV from 1995 to 1998. In 2004, Rawle appeared as Roger Fenn in the ITV series Doc Martin. The actor made a guest appearance as lawyer Jonathan Blunt in the fourth episode of the fourth series of New Tricks (2007).

In 2005, Rawle portrayed Amos Diggory, father of Cedric Diggory (Robert Pattinson), in Harry Potter and the Goblet of Fire.

2008 saw Rawle play Gilbert Murray in the National Theatre's production of Tony Harrison's play Fram. The following year, he guested in The Bill and appeared in The Sarah Jane Adventures on CBBC. During 2010, Rawle joined the cast of Hollyoaks as serial killer Silas Blissett. He stated that he was delighted to be playing such a sinister character. He has won various awards for his portrayal of Silas. He initially left the role in 2012, before making guest returns from January to May 2016, and from October 2020 to January 2021. He reprised the role in September 2022, when his grandson, Bobby, finally killed off his character.

In October 2012, it was announced that Rawle had joined the Doctors' cast as Rory Bishton, a road sweeper with something to hide. Rawle made his screen debut as Rory in early 2013. He had previously appeared in the series in 2004.

Rawle has provided numerous narrations, including A Bear Called Paddington, three series of the Duchess of York's Budgie the Little Helicopter, Stephen Hawking's Universe and Tom Fort's The Grass is Always Greener for BBC Radio 4. Rawle's writing credits include The Young Poisoner's Handbook in 1995 and Who Goes There?

== Filmography and television ==
Year	Title	Role	Notes
1973 – 1974	Billy Liar	Billy Fisher	TV series; 26 episodes
1975	Play for Today	Steve	episode: "The Death of a Young, Young Man"
1975	Whodunnit?	Arthur Johnson	Episode: "Worth Dying For"
1975	Crown Court	Robert Gray	episode: "Bad Day at Black Cape: Part 1"
1977	Van der Valk	Diederick	TV series; episode: "The Professor"
1978	The Life Story of Baal	Johannes	
1978	A Hitch in Time	'Sniffy' Kemp	
1978	The Wilde Alliance	Pusher	TV series; episode: "A Game for Two Players"
1979	Leave it to Charlie	Tristram	TV series; episode: "Never a Cross Word"
1979	Home Before Midnight	Johnnie McGee	
1980	Hammer House of Horror	Franks	TV series; episode: "Charlie Boy"
1981	Juliet Bravo	Steve Ramsey	TV series; episode: "Lies and Liars"
1982	Crystal Gazing	Julian	
1983	Bergerac	Mitch	TV series; episode: "Almost Like a Holiday"
1983	Angels	Jeff Harris	TV series; episodes 22 and 24 of season 9
1984	The Case of Marcel Duchamp	Norbert	
1984	Doctor Who	Plantagenet	TV series; episode: "Frontios"
1985	Remington Steele	Chalky	TV series; episode: "Steele Searching: Parts 1 and 2"
1985	The Doctor and the Devils	Lambert	
1986	Call Me Mister	Guy	TV series; episode: "Humpty Dumpty"
1987	Fortunes of War	Sgt. Ridley	TV miniseries
1987	Boon	Maurice, also known as Billy Clutterbuck	TV series; episode: "Credit Where it's Due"
1988	Screen Two	Billy	TV series; episode: "Run for the Lifeboat"
1988	South of the Border	Stig	BBC TV series; Series 1, episode 3
1988	The Bill	Derek Pardoe	TV series; episode: "Alarms and Embarrassments"
1989	Vote for Them	W.O. Wilson	3 part mini-series
1989	ScreenPlay		episode: "Testimony of a Child" (Note: Jeff Rawle is not in the Radio Times listing for "Testimony of a Child")
1989	ScreenPlay	The Man	episode: "Beyond the Pale"
1990	The Gift	John Price	6 part mini-series for children
1990–1998	Drop the Dead Donkey	George Dent	TV series
1990	This is David Harper	Bob Benchley	TV series; episode: "A List of Abuses"
1991	A Perfect Hero	Service Policeman	TV series
1992	The Life and Times of Henry Pratt	Ezra Pratt	TV series
1992	Casualty	Len Jackson	TV series; episode: "Silent Night", series 7 episode 15
1993	Minder	Jehovah's Witness	TV series; episode: "Uneasy Rider"
1994 – 1996	Budgie the Little Helicopter	Narrator and Dell the baggage cart towing truck	TV series; voice
1994	Wycliffe	Reverend Jordan	TV series; episode: "The Last Rites"
1995	Look at the State We're In!	Jeff Jarndyce	TV mini-series
1995 – 1998	Faith in the Future	Paul	TV series
1996	Lord of Misrule	Derek	TV
1998	Neville's Island	Neville	TV
1998 – 2000	Microsoap	Colin	TV series
2000	I Saw You	Frank	TV
2000	Take a Girl Like You	Mr. Charlton	TV
2002	Dalziel and Pascoe	Raymond Miles	TV series; episode: "Mens Sana"
2003	Midsomer Murders	Derrick Seagrove	TV series, episode: "A Talent for Life"
2003	Blackball	Dennis	
2003	Death in Holy Orders	Father Peregrine Glover	TV
2004	Doctors	John Marshall	TV series; episode: "A Late Flowering"
2004	The Royal	Banks	TV series; episode: "Doing Time"
2004	The Deputy	Graham Hammond	TV
2004	Heartbeat	Ken Simner	TV series; episode: "Scent of a Kill"
2004	William and Mary	George Emerson	TV series; series 2 episode 5
2004	My Dad's the Prime Minister	Union leader	TV series; episode: "Powerless"
2004 – 2007	Doc Martin	Roger Fenn	TV series; episodes: "Gentlemen Prefer", "Sh*t Happens", "Haemophobia", "The Family Way", "Happily Ever After"
2005	Ultimate Force	David Cox	TV series; episode: "Never Go Back"
2005	Holby City	Ron Fell	TV series; episode: "It's Kinda Rock 'n' Roll"
2005	Spooks	Home Secretary	Also known as MI-5 in the USA; TV series; episodes: "The Special: Part I" and "The Special: Part II"
2005	A Touch of Frost	Steve Markham	TV series; episode: "Near Death Experience"
2005	Harry Potter and the Goblet of Fire	Amos Diggory	
2006	Holby City	Roger Nash	TV series; episodes: "Team Holby", "Nothing Ventured, Nothing Lost", "Now or Never"
2006	Sea of Souls	James Norman	TV series; episode: "Oracle"
2006	The Large Family	Mr. Large	TV series; voice
2009	The Bill	George Fielding	TV series, episode: "Innocence Betrayed"
2009	The Sarah Jane Adventures	Lionel Harding	Museum Curator, Mona Lisa's Revenge
2010–2011, 2012, 2016, 2020–2021, 2022	Hollyoaks & Hollyoaks Later	Silas Blissett	Series regular
2011	Midsomer Murders	Gerry Dawkins	TV series, episode: "Dark Secrets"
2011	My Family	Antiques expert	episode: Germs of Endearment
2012	The Charles Dickens Show	Charles Dickens	TV miniseries
2013	An Adventure in Space and Time	Mervyn Pinfield	Television docudrama about the creation of Doctor Who in 1963
2013	Heading Out	Donald	One episode
2013 – 2017	Holby City	Jerry Clark	TV series; episodes: "Hanssen/Hemingway", "Unravelled", "Black Dog", "We Need to Talk About Fredrik"
2016	Bottersnikes and Gumbles	Happi	Voice only
2016	Steptoe and Son	Albert Steptoe	A one-off episode, part of the BBC's Lost Sitcom season, recreating lost episodes of classic comedies
2018	Peterloo	Magistrate Rev. Hay	Film directed by Mike Leigh
2019	Father Brown	Professor Robert Wiseman	Season 7 episode 3: "The Whistle in the Dark"
2020	Brassic	Mr. Bates	Season 2 episode 3: "Antique Hunters"
2021	The Canterville Ghost	Duke George 'Bluey' Stilton	
2023	Lockwood & Co.	Sebastian Saunders	Netflix series; two episodes
2023	Grantchester	Dr. Abbot	Season 8, episode 3
2024	Beyond Paradise	Douglas Bevan	Season 2, episode 6
2026	Vote Gavin Lyle	Arthur	Short film
