= Billy Liar on the Moon =

1975 novel by Keith Waterhouse

- First edition
- Author: Keith Waterhouse
- Language: English
- Genre: Comedy
- Publisher: Michael Joseph
- Publication date: 1975
- Publication place: United Kingdom
- Media type: Print

Billy Liar on the Moon is a 1975 comedy novel by the British writer Keith Waterhouse. It is the sequel to his 1959 work Billy Liar. It continues the adventures of Billy Fisher, now grown up but continuing to live in a fantasy world.

== Synopsis ==
Billy Fisher, aged 33, lives in Shepford, a (fictitious) town located somewhere south of Birmingham and close to the M1 motorway. He works in the Information and Publicity Department of Shepford District Council. Shepford is gradually losing what character it had to an ongoing process of insensitive redevelopment and replanning. One of Billy's roles is to help put a positive spin on this, and he is involved in preparing the latest edition of the town guidebook, Pageantry with Progress. He is married to Jeanette, and lives with her and his widowed mother in a 12th-floor flat on the Fairways estate. The marriage is uncomfortable: one cause of friction is that Jeanette has aspirations of moving to a bungalow (nicknamed by Billy "Mortgagedene") on the new out-of-town Mayfield development.

Billy is also involved in an extramarital affair with Helen Lightfoot, a married woman. This relationship is similarly strained, as Helen wants a higher level of emotional commitment from Billy, and often phones him at home or work (sometimes when drunk), attempting to bluff her way past his wife or secretaries by adopting various false identities. Billy's head of department is Reggie Rainbell, known to Billy as "Pisspot" on account of his heavy drinking. Rainbell is often absent from work, but is also approaching retirement: Billy hopes to succeed to his job. Meanwhile, Billy has an inner fantasy life, in which he and his alter ego, a wisecracking American named Oscar, exchange comments on the world around them.

Life becomes increasingly complicated. Billy has routinely reclaimed the costs of his dates with Helen as work-related expenses: there are now signs that a rival candidate for Rainbell's job, James Purchase of the Finance Department, is investigating these claims. Trying to cover up for an unwelcome visit from Helen at home, Billy claims that he has had a set of golf clubs stolen: the police (in the form of Detective Constable Jack Carpenter) become involved, and Billy is drawn into another convoluted web of deceit. His junior colleague, Hattersley, informs Geoffrey Lightfoot, Helen's husband, of his wife's infidelity, leading to an awkward confrontation. The influential Councillor Percy Drummond, whom Billy has been trying to impress, is revealed to have sold the Town Hall in a highly questionable deal. On a visit to view a show bungalow in Mayfield, Billy and Jeanette discover Helen and Detective Constable Carpenter naked in bed together.

The Shepford Festival, a local carnival event, descends into chaos, thanks in part to poor planning by Billy; and the published Pageantry with Progress is found to contain an offensive caption which Billy had written as a joke, but which Hattersley had surreptitiously inserted into the final copy. Nevertheless, Billy's failings are overshadowed by the very public arrest at the end of the Festival of both Drummond and Purchase on charges of corruption. Rainbell is given early retirement, and Hattersley is appointed his successor. Billy is offered (with little option to refuse) a transfer to a lower status job in the Rates Office. Jeanette announces that she is pregnant, and Billy reluctantly agrees to take out a mortgage on a bungalow.

== Bibliography ==
- Russell, Dave. Looking North: Northern England and the National Imagination. Manchester University Press, 2004.
- Woods, Tim. Who's Who of Twentieth Century Novelists. Routledge, 2008.
