= Carry On Doctor =

1967 British comedy film by Gerald Thomas

- Original UK quad poster by Renato Fratini
- Directed by: Gerald Thomas
- Written by: Talbot Rothwell
- Produced by: Peter Rogers
- Starring: Frankie Howerd; Sid James; Kenneth Williams; Charles Hawtrey; Jim Dale; Barbara Windsor; Hattie Jacques; Joan Sims; Anita Harris; Bernard Bresslaw
- Cinematography: Alan Hume
- Edited by: Alfred Roome
- Music by: Eric Rogers
- Distributed by: The Rank Organisation (UK)
- Release date: 21 November 1967
- Running time: 94 minutes
- Country: United Kingdom
- Language: English
- Budget: £214,000

Carry On Doctor is a 1967 British comedy film, the 15th in the series of 31 Carry On films (1958–1992). It is the second in the series to have a medical theme. Frankie Howerd makes the first of his two appearances in the film series and stars alongside regulars Sid James, Kenneth Williams, Jim Dale, Charles Hawtrey, Joan Sims, Peter Butterworth, and Bernard Bresslaw. Hattie Jacques returns for the first time since Carry On Cabby four years earlier, while Barbara Windsor returns after her debut in Carry On Spying three years earlier. Carry On Doctor marks Anita Harris's second and final appearance in the series. The film was followed by Carry On Up the Khyber in 1968.

== Plot ==
Charlatan faith healer Francis Bigger, who convinces attendees, with the help of his assistant Chloe Gibson, that "mind over matter" is more effective than medical treatment, suffers an accident during one of his lectures. Admitted to the local hospital, he quickly demands a private room after encountering his ward's eccentric patients: bedridden layabout Charlie Roper, who fakes symptoms to stay in hospital; Ken Biddle who, while recovering from an operation, makes frequent trips to the ladies' ward to flirt with his love interest, Mavis Winkle; and Mr Barron, whose mental health has declined following news his wife is due to give birth to their first child, leaving him suffering sympathy pains. During Bigger's stay in hospital, he meets the clumsy yet charming Dr Jim Kilmore, who is popular with the patients and loved from afar by the beautiful Nurse Clarke, who subsequently causes him trouble by accident while being checked over. The day after his admission, Bigger meets Dr Kenneth Tinkle, Kilmore's superior, who is detested by the patients as much as is the battleaxe Matron, Lavinia, who harbors an unrequited love for Tinkle.

Shortly after Bigger's arrival, the hospital receives a novice nurse, Sandra May, who reveals to Clarke that she intends to meet Tinkle to repay him for saving her life - although in reality, she was merely given treatment for tonsillitis. After completing a shift on the wards, May heads for Tinkle's room to profess her love for him, violating hospital rules that female staff are not permitted in the male quarters. However, Tinkle cruelly rebuffs her affection, only to find himself caught in an awkward situation by Kilmore and Matron. Fearing for his position, after the departure of May and Kilmore, Tinkle contrives with Lavinia to cover up the truth. An opportunity soon arises for Tinkle to be rid of Kilmore. The young doctor spots May going onto the roof of the nurse's home and believes she is going to commit suicide after her encounter with Tinkle, unaware she intends to sunbathe. In trying to rescue her, Kilmore creates an unfortunate scene that leaves him subject to claims of sexual deviancy.

Summoned to a hearing with the hospital governor, Kilmore attempts to reveal the truth, but Tinkle and Matron deny the accusation, revealing that May has since been made to leave. Nurse Clarke knows what really happened on the roof. With his reputation in ruins, Kilmore decides to resign, prompting Clarke to tell the male patients what she knows. Roper, disgusted with what was done to Kilmore, arranges for the whole ward to seek revenge on Tinkle and Matron, with Biddle asking Mavis for the help of the women patients. Conducting a nocturnal mutiny, the patients swiftly subdue Sister Hoggett, preventing her from alerting the orderlies. The group bring along Bigger who, after mishearing Tinkle's conversation with his assistant, believes he is dying. This has prompted him to marry Chloe. The gang capture Tinkle and Matron. While the women force a confession from Matron by making her endure a blanket bath, the men force Tinkle to confess after threatening him with an enema, after several other methods fail to work.

The next day, Dr Kilmore is appointed the new hospital registrar while Tinkle is reduced to a simple doctor. Mr Barron, now fully recovered and cured, leaves with his wife and their new baby. Meanwhile, Bigger prepares to leave the hospital with Chloe, but resents the bickering he must endure and the fact that he must give up his work as a faith healer. On the way out, Bigger deliberately falls on the steps and injures his back again. As he is being brought back inside the hospital, he breaks the fourth wall to inform the audience he hopes he will be staying for a long time.

== Cast ==
- Frankie Howerd as Francis Kitchener Bigger
- Kenneth Williams as Doctor Kenneth Tinkle
- Sid James as Charlie Roper
- Charles Hawtrey as Mr Barron
- Jim Dale as Doctor Jim Kilmore
- Hattie Jacques as Lavinia, the Matron
- Peter Butterworth as Mr Smith
- Bernard Bresslaw as Ken Biddle
- Barbara Windsor as Nurse Sandra May
- Joan Sims as Chloe Gibson
- Anita Harris as Nurse Clarke
- June Jago as Sister Hoggett
- Derek Francis as Sir Edmund Burke
- Dandy Nichols as Mrs Roper
- Peter Jones as Chaplain
- Deryck Guyler as Surgeon Hardcastle
- Gwendolyn Watts as Mrs Mildred Barron
- Dilys Laye as Mavis Winkle
- Peter Gilmore as Henry
- Harry Locke as Sam
- Marianne Stone as Mother
- Jean St. Clair as Mrs Smith
- Valerie Van Ost as Nurse Parkin
- Julian Orchard as Fred
- Brian Wilde as Cox & Carter man
- Lucy Griffiths as Miss Morrison
- Gertan Klauber as Wash orderly
- Julian Holloway as Doctor Simmons
- Jenny White as Nurse in bath
- Helen Ford as Nurses Home nurse
- Gordon Rollings as Night porter
- Simon Cain as Tea orderly (uncredited)
- Cheryl Molineaux as Women's ward nurse (uncredited)
- Alexandra Dane as Female instructor (uncredited)
- Pat Coombs as Anxious patient (uncredited)
- Bart Allison as Granddad (uncredited)
- Jane Murdoch as Nurse (uncredited)
- Stephen Garlick as Small boy (uncredited)
- Patrick Allen as Narrator (uncredited)

== Crew ==
- Screenplay – Talbot Rothwell
- Music – Eric Rogers
- Production manager – Jack Swinburne
- Art director – Cedric Dawe
- Editor – Alfred Roome
- Director of photography – Alan Hume
- Assistant editor – Jack Gardner
- Continuity – Joy Mercer
- Assistant director – Terry Clegg
- Camera operator – Jim Bawden
- Make-up – Geoffrey Rodway
- Sound recordists – Dudley Messenger and Ken Barker
- Hairdressing – Stella Rivers
- Dubbing editor – David Campling
- Costume designer – Yvonne Caffin
- Title sketches – Larry
- Producer – Peter Rogers
- Director – Gerald Thomas

== Filming and locations ==
Filming dates: 11 September to 20 October 1967

Interiors:

- Pinewood Studios, Buckinghamshire

Exteriors:

- Maidenhead, where the Town Hall doubled for the hospital
- Masonic Hall, Uxbridge
- Westbourne Street, London WC2

== Reception ==
=== Box office ===
The film was the third biggest general release hit at the British box office in 1968, after The Jungle Book and Barbarella. According to Kinematograph Weekly, there were four British films in the top ten general releases of 1968: Up the Junction, Poor Cow, Here We Go Round the Mulberry Bush and Carry on Doctor.

=== Critical response ===
The film received mixed responses from critics. The British Film Institute described the film as a "Bedpanorama of hospital life", writing: "This new Carry On looks back to the Doctor series in that the farce is rather less grotesque than of late and much of the material is in light comedy vein. In all other respects, though, it is the story as before. The plot is no more than a mess of inane sketches involving the misfortunes of hospital patients and staff, punctuated by a string of tasteless jokes about castor oil, bedpans and parts of the anatomy. Frankie Howerd joins the regulars and seems quite at home".

== Bibliography ==
- Bright, Morris; Ross, Robert (2000). Mr Carry On – The Life & Work of Peter Rogers. London: BBC Books. ISBN 978-0-563-55183-6.
- Davidson, Andy (2012). Carry On Confidential. London: Miwk. ISBN 978-1-908630-01-8.
- Eastaugh, Kenneth (1978). The Carry On Book. London: David & Charles. ISBN 978-0-7153-7403-0.
- Hibbin, Sally & Nina (1988). What a Carry On. London: Hamlyn. ISBN 978-0-600-55819-4.
- Hudis, Norman (2008). No Laughing Matter. London: Apex. ISBN 978-1-906358-15-0.
- Rigelsford, Adrian (1996). Carry On Laughing – a celebration. London: Virgin. ISBN 1-85227-554-5.
- Ross, Robert (1998) [1996]. The Carry On Companion. London: Batsford. ISBN 0-7134-8439-X.
- Keeping the British End Up: Four Decades of Saucy Cinema by Simon Sheridan (third edition, 2007: Reynolds & Hearn Books)
- Sheridan, Simon (2011). Keeping the British End Up – Four Decades of Saucy Cinema. London: Titan Books. ISBN 978-0-85768-279-6.
- Webber, Richard (2009). 50 Years of Carry On. London: Arrow. ISBN 978-0-09-949007-4.
