= The Traveler (2010 film) =

- Directed by: Michael Oblowitz
- Written by: Joseph C. Muscat
- Produced by: Nadine DeBarros; Harvey Kahn
- Starring: Val Kilmer; Dylan Neal
- Cinematography: Neil Cervin
- Edited by: Gordon Rempel
- Music by: Ross Vannelli
- Production companies: Hollywood Media Bridge; Front Street Pictures; Voltage Pictures
- Distributed by: Paramount Pictures
- Release dates: June 2010 (Aruba IFF); October 2010 (United States)
- Running time: 96 minutes
- Countries: Canada; United States
- Language: English

The Traveler is a 2010 American–Canadian supernatural horror film directed by Michael Oblowitz written by Joseph C. Muscat, and starring Val Kilmer and Dylan Neal. Kilmer plays a stranger who walks into a small town's police station, confesses to murder, and is interrogated by detective Alexander Black (Neal).

== Plot ==
A stranger walks into a small town's police station during a rainstorm on Christmas Eve. He tells the desk sergeant that he wishes to confess to murder, after which the desk sergeant points a handgun at him and calls for his colleagues to restrain him with handcuffs.

The stranger refuses to reveal his name, preferring to be known as "Mr. Nobody." After the stranger provokes them, the officers are about to assault him as detective Alexander Black walks in. The stranger states that he will confess to six murders, and when he describes each murder, the officers graphically die in the same way he explains though the stranger himself remains incarcerated. While the officers panic, the stranger notices a dedication text on detective Black's golden-metal pen and remarks upon it, drawing the suspicion of Detective Black, who received the pen from his murdered daughter, Mary Black.

The officers think that the stranger could be a suspect whom they arrested a year earlier when they were investigating Mary's disappearance. Unable to prove his guilt, they tortured and beat him to get a confession, though he continually maintained his innocence. However, they realize that the victim of their violence should still be in a coma that resulted from their brutal torture, stationed at a medical facility. The officers telephone the facility and discover that the victim had died earlier that evening, at the same time as the stranger entered the police station, which proves that the stranger is not who they thought he is.

Despite this new evidence, the officers believe that the stranger is a vengeful spirit of the previously tortured man. Detective Black talks about superstition and his experiences in Gulf War, while the remaining officers continue to die in ways that mirror the acts they committed against the now-dead suspect a year earlier, until only detective Black remains.

Detective Black apologizes to the stranger for killing an innocent suspect, but the stranger confesses that he was the one who murdered his daughter, which makes all the brutality against him by Black and his fellow officers justified. Detective Black then stabs his daughter's golden-metal pen inside his own ears to avoid hearing the stranger's confession. Black's daughter spirit then appears. She tells him she knows the name of the stranger, which is Stanley Harpenden to eliminate his power and whispers into his deaf ear. Black shoots the stranger with a shotgun and causes him to fall through a window to his death. His body vanishes soon after.

After the stranger's death, Christmas Day arrives and Detective Black sees his daughter walk up the stairs, presumably moving on to the afterlife.

== Cast ==
- Dylan Neal as Detective Alexander Black
- Val Kilmer as Mr. Nobody
- Paul McGillion as Deputy Jerry Pine
- Camille Sullivan as Deputy Jane Hollow
- Nels Lennarson as Deputy Toby Sherwood
- Chris Gauthier as Desk Sergeant Gulloy
- John Cassini as Deputy Jack Hawkins
- Sierra Pitkin as Mary Black
- Panou as Trooper Vitelli
- Denyc as Trooper Velasquez

== Production ==
The film was shot in Vancouver, British Columbia, Canada.

== Release ==
The film was first shown at the Aruba International Film Festival in June 2010 before its release in the United States in October 2010 by Paramount Pictures. It was released on home video on January 25, 2011.

== Reception ==
Rotten Tomatoes, a review aggregator, reports that 20% of five surveyed critics gave the film a positive review; the average rating was 2.5/10. John Marrone of Bloody Disgusting rated it 2.5/5 stars and called it "a decent horror flick" that has been unfairly criticized. Gordon Sullivan of DVD Verdict called it a predictable and boring film that is comparable to the early, weaker X-Files episodes. Todd Rigney of Beyond Hollywood called it "a fetid slice of supernatural tomfoolery that will insult your intelligence every chance it gets." Allan Dart of Fangoria called it "monotonous, silly and lamentably predictable".
