= Frank & Ava =

- Film poster
- Directed by: Michael Oblowitz
- Screenplay by: Willard Manus; Rico Simonini
- Based on: Frank & Ava by Willard Manus
- Produced by: Douglas Kaplan
- Starring: Rico Simonini; Emily Elicia Low
- Cinematography: Michael Oblowitz; Daniele Poli
- Edited by: Christopher Cibelli; Cody Miller
- Music by: Misha Segal
- Production companies: 8th House Entertainment; All Edge Entertainment
- Release date: September 2018 (LAIFF)
- Running time: 113 minutes
- Country: United States
- Language: English

Frank & Ava is a 2018 American biographical drama film directed by Michael Oblowitz and starring Rico Simonini as Frank Sinatra and Emily Elicia Low as Ava Gardner. It is based on the play of the same name by Willard Manus. This marked the final film appearances of Harry Dean Stanton and Katherine Helmond before their deaths in 2017 and 2019 respectively.

== Cast ==
- Rico Simonini as Frank Sinatra
- Emily Elicia Low as Ava Gardner
- Eric Roberts as Harry Cohn
- Jonathan Silverman as Mannie Sacks
- Harry Dean Stanton as Sheriff Lloyd
- Lukas Haas as Officer Josenhans
- Joanne Baron as Hedda Hopper
- Richard Portnow as Walter Winchell
- Joanna Sanchez as Louella Parsons
- Katherine Helmond as Betty Burns
- Michael Alaimo as Barber Nunzio

== Reception ==
Stephen Farber of The Hollywood Reporter gave the film a negative review and wrote "Bargain-basement treatment of Hollywood royalty."

== Re-release ==
In 2025, the film premiered with new scenes featuring Michael Madsen under the title Sinatra! Eternity.
