= Gwendolyn Watts =

English actress (1937–2000)

- Gwen Watts as Iris in On the Buses (1969)
- Born: 23 September 1937; Carhampton, Somerset, England
- Died: 5 February 2000 (aged 62)
- Occupation: Actress
- Years active: 1958–1995
- Spouse: Gertan Klauber (m. 1959)
- Family: Sally Watts (sister)

Gwendolyn Watts (23 September 1937 – 5 February 2000) was an English actress of the 1960s and 1970s. she was best known for her role as Iris in On The Buses.

== Career ==
Born in Carhampton, Somerset, the daughter of Colin B. Watts and Annie née Lewis, Watts made her first television appearance in 1958 in an episode of Alfred Hitchcock Presents, going on to appear in Walk a Crooked Mile (1961), The Rag Trade (1962), The Avengers (1963), Maigret (1963), a French au pair in Steptoe and Son (1964), Esther Waters (1964), Mary Barton (1964), Armchair Mystery Theatre (1964), The Benny Hill Show (1965), The Worker (1965), Softly, Softly (1966), Adam Adamant Lives! (1966), Z-Cars (1962–1967), On the Buses (1969), Coronation Street (1971), Love Thy Neighbour (1972), Sam (1973) and The Final Cut (1995).

Her film appearances include Sons and Lovers (1960), So Evil, So Young (1961), Rita in Billy Liar (1963), My Fair Lady (1964), The System (1964), Fanatic (1965), The Wrong Box (1966), Carry On Doctor (1967), All Neat in Black Stockings (1968), Carry On Again Doctor (1969), The Games (1970) and Carry On Matron (1972).

== Personal life ==
Married to actor Gertan Klauber from 1959 until her death, Watts gave up full-time acting in the early 1970s to bring up her children, but she returned a few years later. She was the sister of actress Sally Watts.

Gwendolyn Watts died in 2000, aged 62, from a heart attack.

== Filmography ==
Year	Title	Role	Notes
1960	Sons and Lovers	May	
1961	So Evil, So Young	Edna	
1962	The Notorious Landlady	Wife	Uncredited
1963	Billy Liar	Rita	
1964	The System	First Class Girl	
1964	My Fair Lady	Cook	Uncredited
1965	Fanatic	Gloria	
1965	You Must Be Joking!	Young wife	
1966	The Wrong Box	Maidservant	
1967	Carry On Doctor	Mrs Barron	
1969	All Neat in Black Stockings	Suburban housewife	
1969	Carry On Again Doctor	Night Sister	
1970	The Games	Barmaid	
1972	Carry On Matron	Frances Kemp	

== TV credits ==
Year	Title	Role	Notes
1958	Alfred Hitchcock Presents	Sir Francis Garrold's wife Mrs. Garrold	Season 3 Episode 38: "The Impromptu Murder"
1960	Yorky (TV series)	Bet	Episode: 'Good with His Hands'
1960	Man from Interpol (TV series)		Episode: 'The Big Racket'
1960	No Hiding Place	Iris	Episode: 'The Final Chase'
1961	Walk a Crooked Mile (TV mini-series)	Blonde	
1961	Harpers West One (TV series)	Maureen	
1961	It's a Square World	Various	
1961	Here's Harry (TV series)	Elsie the cashier	Episode: 'The Overdraft'
1962	The Rag Trade		
1962	Z-Cars	Vera Smales	Episode: 'Full Remission'
1963	ITV Television Playhouse	Betty	Episode: 'Adam's Apple'
1963	The Plane Makers	Betty	
1963	The Odd Man	Delia	Episode: 'The Town That Dies at Eight'
1963	Sergeant Cork	Rose Wolf	Episode: 'The Case of Ella Barnes'
1963	The Avengers	Julie	Episode: 'Man with Two Shadows'
1963	Maigret		Episode: 'A Taste of Power'
1964	Steptoe and Son	Monique	Episode: 'Steptoe a la Cart'
1964	The Villains (TV series)	Mavis	Episode: 'Les Girls'
1964	Mary Barton	Margaret Legh	
1964	Armchair Mystery Theatre		Episode: 'Admirer at Number Eight'
1964	Redcap	Vera and Gerda	Episode: 'A Town Called Love'
1964	Esther Waters (TV series)	Margaret Gale	Episode: 'The Lottery'
1964	Thursday Theatre	Ruby Birtle	Episode: 'When We Are Married'
1965	The Benny Hill Show	Various	
1965	Call It What You Like (TV series)	Various	
1965	Blackmail (TV series)		Episode: 'Cut Yourself a Slice of Throat'
1965	The Worker	Cilla Puce	Episode: 'The Man Who Moved His Head'
1966	No Hiding Place	Nell Burdon	Episode: 'The Lifer'
1966	Pardon the Expression	Miss Huxley	Episode: 'January Sale'
1966	Softly, Softly	Anne Bryant	Episode: 'Blind Man's Bluff'
1966	Mrs Thursday (TV series)	Carol	Episode: 'The Girl from Fuller Street'
1966	Thirteen Against Fate (TV series)	Sylvie Baron	Episode: 'The Lodger'
1966	Adam Adamant Lives!	Janine	Episode: 'To Set a Deadly Fashion'
1967	Mr Rose (TV series)	Eve	Episode: 'The Tin God'
1967	Theatre 625	Janet	Episode: 'The Loser'
1967	Z-Cars	Betty	Episode: 'She's Not Yours, She's Mine'
1967	Sorry I'm Single (TV series)	Brenda	
1968	The Ronnie Barker Playhouse	Mrs. Cecil	Episode: 'Tennyson'
1968	Crime Buster (TV series)	Susan Taylor	Episode: 'The Volterra Affair'
1968	Mystery and Imagination	Sarah Mangles	Episode: 'Uncle Silas'
1969	On the Buses	Iris	Episodes: 'The Darts Match' and 'The New Conductor'
1969	Galton and Simpson Comedy (TV series)	Edie Hentill	Episode: 'Pity Poor Edie... Married to Jim'
1969	The Expert	Maggie Poole	Episode: 'Protection'
1971	Coronation Street	Candy Brown	
1971	Justice (TV series)	Greta Hardy	Episode: 'When Did You First Feel the Pain?'
1972	Love Thy Neighbour	Joan Booth	Episode: 'Pilot'
1972	Villains (TV series)	Evie	Episode: 'Sand Dancer'
1973	Sam	Ruby Barraclough	Episode: 'Breadwinners'
1977	Murder Most English: A Flaxborough Chronicle (TV series)	Mrs Shooter	Episode: 'Coffin Scarcely Used: Part 2'
1983	Small & Frye	Old woman	Episode: 'The Case of the Concerned Husband'
1995	The Final Cut	Sturdy woman	(final appearance)
