= Billy (musical) =

- Music: John Barry
- Lyrics: Don Black
- Book: Dick Clement; Ian La Frenais
- Basis: Novel Billy Liar by Keith Waterhouse and the play of the same name by Waterhouse and Willis Hall
- Productions: 1974 West End

Billy is a musical based on the novel and play Billy Liar by Keith Waterhouse and Willis Hall. The book was written by Dick Clement and Ian La Frenais, the music is by John Barry, and the lyrics are by Don Black.

== Productions ==
Billy opened at the Palace Theatre, Manchester, before moving on 1 May 1974 to the West End at the Theatre Royal, Drury Lane, where it ran for 904 performances.

The cast included Michael Crawford in the title role, with Bryan Pringle (Geoffrey Fisher), Avis Bunnage (Alice Fisher), Christopher Hancock (Mr. Shadrack), Billy Boyle, Diana Quick (Liz Benson), Gay Soper (Barbara), and Elaine Paige (Rita). The production was directed by Patrick Garland with choreography by Onna White, set by Ralph Kotai, costumes by Annena Stubbs, and lighting by Jules Fisher. Roy Castle replaced Crawford late in the run.

The first revival and reimagining of Billy was staged at the Union Theatre in London in June 2013. The production under the staging and direction of Michael Strassen received rave five-star reviews, who also received the 2013 Offie for Director. The Independent, awarding it five stars, wrote: "Michael Strassen's feisty, intelligent, sensationally well lit (by Tim Deiling) production... The first act is extraordinary and the second, like Gypsy's, tapers off into mere brilliance."

== Plot ==
Billy Fisher is an undertaker's assistant who daydreams and lies about his life. He wants to leave his dull, middle-class home in Yorkshire and his dreams become reality for him. In one dream, he is in the mythical land of "Ambrosia", where he is its president and also Captain of its football team. In other dreams he becomes both famous dancers Gene Kelly and Fred Astaire.

== Musical numbers ==
- "Ambrosia" — chorus
- "And" — Alice, Geoffrey, Gran, Billy
- "Some of Us Belong to the Stars" — Billy
- "Happy to Be Themselves" — Billy, Arthur, company
- "The Witch's Song" — Barbara, Billy
- "Lies " — Barbara, Billy
- "It Were All Green Hills" — Councillor Duxbury
- "Aren't You Billy Fisher?" — Billy, company
- "My Heart Is Ready When You Are" — Liz, Billy
- "Is This Where I Wake Up" — Billy
- "Billy" — Billy, Liz, Barbara, Rita
- "Remembering" — Alice, Geoffrey
- "Any Minute Now" — Rita, Barbara
- "The Lady from L.A." — Billy, company
- "I Can Make A Difference" — Liz, Billy
- "Why Can't I Feel Something?" — instrumental
- "I Missed the Last Rainbow" — Billy
- "Finale, Some of Us Belong To The Star" (reprise), "Ambrosia" (reprise)

"My Heart Is Ready When You Are", "I Can Make A Difference", and "Why Can't I Feel Something?" were not part of the 1970s production. They were written and added for a revival in the 1990s.

== Reception ==
According to theatre critic Ken Mandelbaum, "Billy was a brassy, Broadway-style musical, and it took advantage of the services of top-notch American choreographer Onna White. But its trump card was its star, Michael Crawford."

== Recording ==
The Original Cast recording was released by CBS (70133) on May 1, 1974.
