= House and Home =

- Editor: Karen Hesse
- Categories: Home and furniture
- Frequency: bimonthly
- Circulation: 26,282 ABC Jan–Jun 06
- First issue: 1996
- Company: Dyflin publications
- Country: Ireland
- Based in: Dublin
- Language: English
- Website: houseandhome.ie

House and Home is an interiors magazine published by Dyflin publications in Dublin, Ireland. The magazine primarily covers the area of soft furnishings and also pays particular regards to upcoming and current trends in the interior design industry.

The magazine was established in 1996 and contains features such as "Design focus", "Real homes", "Best buys" and "Inspiring ideas". The publication is published 6 times per year and is distributed to retailers and subscribers in the North and South of Ireland, along with a small number of international readers.
