= Pamela Vezey =

English actress

Pamela Vezey (19 September 1932, Bath, Somerset – 18 June 1992) was an English actress best known for her roles as Kath Brownlow/Fellowes in Crossroads and as the mother of Carol and Trisha Yates in the children's television series Grange Hill.

She died of cancer in 1992.

== Television credits ==
Year	Title	Role	Notes
1971	Trial	Assistant Matron	
1972	Villains	Sandra's mum	
1973	Public Eye	Shirley Haines	
1973	Billy Liar	Alice Fisher	
1973	Romany Jones	Housewife	
1973	BBC Play of the Month	Doreen Carter	
1973	All Star Comedy Carnival	Alice Fisher	
1973–1974	Billy Liar	Mrs. Alice Fisher	a) Including 1973 A Christmas Night with the Stars b) 27 episodes
1976	Angels	Sister	
1978–1979	Grange Hill	Mrs. Yates	6 episodes
1980	Sounding Brass	Dorothy Thompson	2 episodes
1980–1986	Crossroads	Kath Brownlow/Fellowes	
