= Billy Liar (song) =

2004 single by The Decemberists

Single by The Decemberists

from the album Her Majesty the Decemberists
- Released: September 14, 2004
- Length: 14:51
- Label: Kill Rock Stars
- Songwriter: Colin Meloy

The Decemberists singles chronology
"Billy Liar" (2004)	"Sixteen Military Wives" (2005)

"Billy Liar" is the debut single by the Decemberists. Deriving its title from the English novel and British New Wave film, Billy Liar, the song also references "No good Boyo" of Dylan Thomas's Under Milk Wood and appears to generally talk about a young man's boredom during long summer days. Musically, it has an upbeat, somewhat piano-driven, rather poppy sound.

The single peaked at number 24 on the US Billboard charts in October 2004.

== Track listing ==
1. "Billy Liar" – 4:08
2. "Los Angeles, I'm Yours" – 4:17
3. "Everything I Try to Do, Nothing Seems to Turn Out Right" – 4:03
4. "Sunshine" – 2:23
