= Billy Liar (film) =

1963 film by John Schlesinger

- Theatrical release poster
- Directed by: John Schlesinger
- Screenplay by: Keith Waterhouse; Willis Hall
- Based on: Billy Liar (1959 novel) by Keith Waterhouse; Billy Liar (1960 play) by Keith Waterhouse Willis Hall
- Produced by: Joseph Janni
- Starring: Tom Courtenay; Julie Christie
- Cinematography: Denys Coop
- Edited by: Roger Cherrill
- Music by: Richard Rodney Bennett
- Production companies: Vic Films Productions; Waterhall Productions
- Distributed by: Anglo-Amalgamated Film Distributors; Warner-Pathé
- Release dates: 15 August 1963 (West End, London)
- Running time: 98 minutes
- Country: United Kingdom
- Language: English
- Budget: $1 million or £236,809
- Box office: £22,173 (US)

Billy Liar is a 1963 British CinemaScope comedy-drama film based on the 1959 novel by Keith Waterhouse. Directed by John Schlesinger, it stars Tom Courtenay (who had understudied Albert Finney in the West End theatre adaptation of the novel) as Billy and Julie Christie as Liz, one of his three girlfriends. Mona Washbourne plays Mrs. Fisher and Wilfred Pickles plays Mr. Fisher. Rodney Bewes, Finlay Currie and Leonard Rossiter also feature. The Cinemascope photography is by Denys Coop and Richard Rodney Bennett supplied the score.

The film belongs to the British New Wave, inspired by both the earlier kitchen sink realism movement and the French New Wave. Characteristic of the style is a documentary/cinéma vérité feel and the use of real locations (in this case, many in the city of Bradford in Yorkshire).

== Plot ==
Billy Fisher lives in Yorkshire with his parents and grandmother. Billy wishes to get away from his stifling job and family life. To escape the boredom of his humdrum existence, he constantly daydreams and fantasizes, often picturing himself as the ruler and military hero of an imaginary country called Ambrosia. In his fantasies, he gives speeches to large crowds in a manner resembling Hitler or Mussolini. He makes up stories about himself and his family, causing him to be nicknamed "Billy Liar". In reality, he lives in a working-class home with parents who constantly scold and nag him about his behaviour.

Billy works as an undertakers' clerk overseen by the rigid Mr. Shadrack. At work, he is tasked with mailing out a large shipment of advertising calendars to potential customers, but instead hides the calendars and keeps the postage money. When he notices the calendars in his wardrobe, he dreams of being imprisoned in Wormwood Scrubs for the crime of pocketing the postage money. He is eventually found out by Shadrack, who refuses to let him resign from his position until he pays back the postage money.

Billy aspires to get a more interesting job as a scriptwriter for comic Danny Boon, but when Boon comes to town, he is not interested in Billy's overtures. However, Billy tells everyone that Boon is very interested in his stories and that he will be moving to London very soon. Whenever Billy experiences something unpleasant, such as his parents scolding him or his boss harassing him, he imagines himself to be somewhere else. His fantasies generally involve himself as a hero with everyone very pleased with him. However, Billy shows himself to be happier fantasizing about being a great success than actually taking a risk to make something of himself.

Billy has further complicated his life by proposing to two very different girls, the sheltered, virginal Barbara and the tough, brassy Rita. He has given the same engagement ring to each girl and lies constantly to get it back from one and give it to the other. Rita discovers he has lied about the ring being at the jeweller's and shows up at Billy's door but he lies to her again and she leaves. When Billy's father questions him about what he is doing with Rita, Billy yells at him and his shocked grandmother begins gasping for breath and has to lie down. Billy feels guilty but imagines himself as a general winning a difficult war.

Billy also finds himself attracted to his former girlfriend Liz, who has just returned to town from Doncaster. Liz is a free spirit who, unlike anyone else in town, understands and accepts Billy's imagination. However, she has more courage and confidence than Billy, as shown by her willingness to leave her home town and enjoy new and different experiences. Under pressure, Billy ends up making dates with both Barbara and Rita to meet each one on the same night at the same local ballroom. There, the two girls discover the double engagement and begin fighting with each other. All of Billy's lies seem to catch up with him as it's announced publicly that he is moving to London to work with Danny Boon, and Billy's friend scolds him for lying to his mother.

Distraught, Billy encounters Liz outside and shares a romantic interlude with her, during which he shares his fantasies about Ambrosia. He proposes marriage to her and she accepts. She urges him to accompany her to London that evening, and he goes home to pack his bags, only to find his grandmother has fallen ill and been taken to hospital. Billy gets into an argument with his father, who has found out about Billy's problems at work and trashed Billy's room. Billy joins his mother at the hospital just in time to learn his grandmother has died. He then continues to the station to meet Liz, and the couple board the train, but at the last minute Billy disembarks with the excuse of buying some milk to drink on the journey. He delays returning to the train, and by the time he gets back it is pulling out, with an understanding Liz at the window and his suitcase left behind on the platform. Alone, Billy walks the dark deserted road back to his home, imagining himself leading the marching army of Ambrosia. Billy enters the house closing the door behind him. As the main floor lights can be seen turned off and as Billy's bedroom lights upstairs can be seen turned on, the camera pulls away from the house as the national anthem of Ambrosia starts playing.

== Cast ==
- Tom Courtenay as William Terrence Fisher
- Wilfred Pickles as Geoffrey Fisher
- Mona Washbourne as Alice Fisher
- Ethel Griffies as Florence, Billy's grandmother
- Finlay Currie as Duxbury
- Gwendolyn Watts as Rita
- Helen Fraser as Barbara
- Julie Christie as Liz
- Leonard Rossiter as Emanuel Shadrack
- Rodney Bewes as Arthur Crabtree
- George Innes as Stamp
- Leslie Randall as Danny Boon
- Patrick Barr as Inspector MacDonald
- Ernest Clark as prison governor
- Muriel Day as Club singer 'Twistarella'

== Production ==
The film was one of two financed by Nat Cohen of Anglo-Amalgamated, the other being A Kind of Loving. Much of the film was shot on location in Bradford.

== Release ==
The film opened at the Warner Theatre in London's West End on 15 August 1963.

== Reception ==
=== Critical reception ===
In 2007, Empire praised Tom Courtenay for the main role stating: "Skulking between temerity and timidity, callousness and innocence, Tom Courtenay dominates the picture, whether defrauding his employers or duping his trio of girlfriends. But the most memorable moment remains the sight of Julie Christie on the train to London, watching Courtenay shrugging on the platform and settling for the mediocrity he despises and probably deserves."

The film's ending is considered by film critic Philip French "a pivotal moment in British cinema" as he wrote in his column in The Guardian, while Danny Leigh observed that at the time of its first release, the film fed great expectations about a change in film industry: "Social mobility brought the film to life. While director John Schlesinger was solidly Hampstead, Waterhouse was a dropout from Osmondthorpe Council School, Leeds, and star Tom Courtenay the son of a Hull dockworker. As the box office boomed, a daydreamer might have conjured up a British film industry filled with working-class actors and writers, maybe even directors and producers, too."

In 2020, Slant magazine considered Billy Liar heir to the innovative cinematography developed by Truffaut and its main character somewhat a precursor to A Clockwork Orange's Alex DeLarge.

On the review aggregator website Rotten Tomatoes, 92% of 24 critics' reviews are positive. Metacritic, which uses a weighted average, assigned the film a score of 79 out of 100, based on 6 critics, indicating "generally favorable" reviews.

=== Box office ===
The film was not a box office success. Argued Filmink "Maybe it was too depressing for a comedy, or it didn’t have enough sex. What it did have were positive reviews and an exciting new star: Julie Christie."

=== Accolades ===
Julie Christie was nominated for a BAFTA award for her performance as Liz. The film was also nominated for another five BAFTAs.

In 1999, the British Film Institute named Billy Liar number 76 in its list of the top 100 British films.

In 2004, Total Film named Billy Liar the 12th in its list of the greatest British Films of all time.

== Legacy ==
- The Decemberists recorded a song, also titled "Billy Liar", derived from the plots of the novel and film.

== See also ==
- BFI Top 100 British films
