= George A. Cooper =

British actor (1925–2018)

- Publicity still, 1963
- Born: George Alphonsus Cooper; 7 March 1925; Leeds, West Riding of Yorkshire, England
- Died: 16 November 2018 (aged 93); Liss, Hampshire, England
- Occupations: Actor and voice artist
- Years active: 1946–1995
- Spouse(s): Anne Shirley Jones (m. 1955–2000; (her death)

George Alphonsus Cooper (7 March 1925 – 16 November 2018) was an English actor and voice artist. He died in November 2018 at the age of 93.

== Early life ==
Cooper was born in Leeds, the son of William and Eleanor (née Dobson) Cooper. His father worked on the railways as a train guard. The younger Cooper began to train as an electrical engineer, but enlisted in the Royal Artillery during the Second World War, acting with the Royal Artillery Depot Players in India.

== Stage career ==
After a short period as a draughtsman he joined Theatre Workshop, then based in Manchester. Joan Littlewood's company, also based in Glasgow for a time, then concentrated on performing its productions on tour. The company's permanent base became London's Theatre Royal Stratford East in 1953, the opening production being Twelfth Night with Cooper as Malvolio and Harry H. Corbett as Sir Andrew Aguecheek. Both men were often cast in antagonist roles in Theatre Workshop productions during the next few years. Cooper left the company in 1955. Cooper played Geoffrey Fisher, the stern father of the eponymous antihero Billy Liar, in the original West End stage production in 1960. According to Tom Courtenay, who took over the role of Billy from Albert Finney, immediately prior to his entrance in Act One, Scene One, while waiting in the wings, Cooper would regularly mime taking 'the most enormous shit', which would involve removing his braces, lowering his trousers and making (in)appropriate noises, a routine he timed impeccably, so that his stage entrance would immediately follow hoisting his trousers and braces back into place. His wife, Shirley Jones (married 1955), who worked as a Theatre Workshop costume assistant, did not like his absences during the evenings, and Cooper himself found eight performances of Billy Liar a week to be a strain. Increasingly he turned to television for work.

== Television and film career ==
He had a recurring role in Coronation Street as Willie Piggott, a dubious businessman, between 1964 and 1971. One of his other regular roles was as the caretaker Mr. Griffiths in the long-running children's TV series Grange Hill from 1985 to 1992. He returned to the role of Geoffrey Fisher in the sitcom version of Billy Liar (1973–74).

Among Cooper's other television credits are Vicky and the Sultan, Danger Man, Z-Cars, Dixon of Dock Green, No Hiding Place, Doctor Who, Angel Pavement, Softly, Softly, The Avengers, The Saint, Roll on Four O'Clock, Randall and Hopkirk (Deceased), The Troubleshooters, Steptoe and Son, A Family at War, Doomwatch, Public Eye, Budgie, Bless This House, Sykes, Rising Damp, The New Avengers, Some Mothers Do 'Ave 'Em, All Creatures Great and Small, Poor Little Rich Girls, Juliet Bravo, When the Boat Comes In, Terry and June, Taggart, Casualty and Heartbeat.

Cooper had roles in many films including: Violent Playground (1958), Hell Is a City (1960), The Cracksman (1963), Nightmare (1964), Dracula Has Risen from the Grave (1968) with Christopher Lee, and the film version of Bless This House (1972) with Sid James.

He also appeared in a 1976 training film for British Leyland entitled The Quality Connection, where he plays the disgruntled owner of a new Morris Marina which suffers from numerous faults due to quality deficiencies in the production process.

In 1978, he played the union shop steward in radio sitcom Share and Share Alike.

== Selected filmography ==
- Men of Two Worlds (1946) – Orchestra Conductor
- Okinawa (1952) – Yeoman (uncredited)
- The Passing Stranger (1954) – Charlie
- Jumping for Joy (1956) – Farmer (uncredited)
- Sailor Beware! (1956) – Petty Officer (uncredited)
- The Secret Place (1957) – Harry
- Miracle in Soho (1957) – Foreman
- Violent Playground (1958) – Chief Inspector
- A Night to Remember (1958) – Purser Ernest G. F. Brown, SS Carpathia (uncredited)
- Friends and Neighbours (1959) – George Wheeler
- Hell Is a City (1960) – Doug Savage
- Follow That Horse! (1960) – Rudd
- In the Doghouse (1961) – Veterinary Examiner – (voice overdubbed by Scottish accent)
- The Brain (1962) – Thomas Gabler
- The Wild and the Willing (1962) – 1st Customer
- The Cracksman (1963) – Fred
- Tom Jones (1963) – Mr. Fitzpatrick
- Nightmare (1964) – John
- The Bargee (1964) – Official in Office
- Ferry Cross the Mersey (1964) – Mr. Lumsden
- Life at the Top (1965) – Graffham
- Smashing Time (1967) – Irishman
- The Strange Affair (1968) – Supt. Kingley
- Dracula Has Risen from the Grave (1968) – Landlord
- Start the Revolution Without Me (1970) – Dr. Duval
- Cromwell (1970) – (scenes deleted)
- The Rise and Rise of Michael Rimmer (1970) – Blacket
- What Became of Jack and Jill? (1972) – Trouncer
- Bless This House (1972) – Mr Wilson
- The Vault of Horror (1973) – (scenes deleted)
- The Black Windmill (1974) – Pincus (uncredited)
- Dick Deadeye, or Duty Done (1975) – The Pirate King (voice)
- Trial by Combat (1976) – 2nd Leather Jerkin
