= Billy Liar (band) =

Scottish band

- Origin: Edinburgh, Scotland
- Genres: Punk rock, folk
- Years active: 2005 – present
- Members: Billy Liar
- Website: www.billyliarmusic.com

Billy Liar is an acoustic punk/folk band from Edinburgh, fronted by the solo singer of the same name. Billy tours as a solo artist or with a band, regularly throughout the UK, mainland Europe and the U.S. and signed to the American label Red Scare Industries in 2019.

== Career ==
Liar released his debut EP in 2006. After releasing a string of EPs and split singles, his debut album, Lies Lied Live, was released in 2015.

Billy Liar has toured internationally around Europe, Australia, and the US, and played at numerous festivals such as Fest in the US, Strummer of Love, Wickerman and has performed many times at the Rebellion Festival.

== Discography ==
=== Albums ===
- Some Legacy (2019), Red Scare Industries
- Crisis Actor (2023), Pirates Press Records

=== Singles, EPs ===
- Live at Granton Pierhouse EP (2006)
- It Starts Here EP (2009)
- All I've Got EP (2013)
- The Ghosts of Punk Rock EP (2013)
- Lies Lied Live (2015)
- "What We've Got" (2016) – split single with Paper Rifles
- Funeral Food (2016) – split with Freddy Fudd Pucker
