= Sally Watts =

British actress

- Born: 18 June 1950 (age 76); Somerset, England
- Occupation: Actress
- Known for: Role in TV sitcom Billy Liar (1973–1974)
- Relatives: Gwendolyn Watts (sister)

Sally Watts (born 18 June 1950) is a British film, television and stage actress, whose career has spanned four decades and who is perhaps best remembered for playing Barbara in the sitcom Billy Liar (1973–1974).

== Background ==
Sally Watts was born in Somerset, the daughter of Colin Watts and Annie Watts. She is the younger sister of the actress Gwendolyn Watts.

Her television roles include Solicitor's Secretary in Public Eye (1972); Hunter's Walk (1973); Barbara in 21 episodes of Billy Liar (1973–1974); Farm Girl in Nuts in May for Play for Today (1976); Chrissie in the episode 'A Martyr to the System' in BBC2 Playhouse (1976); Nellie in Scene (1976); Sylvia Paxton/Anne in Rooms (1974–1977); Pauline Wells in Breakaway Girls (1978); Linda/Ruby in ITV Playhouse (1978–1980); Debbie Wilkinson in 13 episodes of The Glamour Girls (1978–80); Cherry Bronson in 10 episodes of Jemima Shore Investigates (1983); The Ties of Blood (1985); Bernice in Never the Twain (1987); Adele McCann in All in Good Faith (1988); Sandra Stubbs in 54 episodes of Coronation Street (1988–1989); Mrs. Morgan in Grange Hill (1994); Nurse in Daisies in December (1995); EastEnders (1996); WPC Hendricks in Wycliffe (1997); various roles in The Bill (1989–2000); Mrs. Hancock in The Stretch (2000); Betty Wheeler in Bad Girls (2001); Landlady in The Quest (2002); School Secretary in Ella and the Mothers (2002); Housekeeper in Daniel Deronda (2002); Margaret Lennox/DS Sally Dalton in Casualty (1993–2004); Laura Carter in Down to Earth (2000); and Mrs. Ava Brooks/Moira Reece in Doctors (2004–2012).

Film appearances include Girl in Coffee Shop in That'll Be the Day (1973) and Mrs. Perkins in the short Wanted (1994). Her stage work includes Cariola in The Duchess of Malfi; Brenda in David Storey's Life Class directed by Lindsay Anderson at the Royal Court Theatre (1974); Cherry in The Beaux Stratagem at the Royal Exchange; Miss Palmer in Multiple Choice at the Yvonne Arnaud Theatre; and Maria in Twelfth Night at the Royal Exchange.
