= Keith Waterhouse =

British novelist and newspaper columnist (1929–2009)

Keith Waterhouse CBE
- Born: Keith Spencer Waterhouse; 6 February 1929; Hunslet, Leeds, England
- Died: 4 September 2009 (aged 80); London, England
- Occupations: Novelist, Columnist, Writer
- Notable work: Billy Liar, Worzel Gummidge

Keith Spencer Waterhouse CBE (6 February 1929 – 4 September 2009) was a British novelist and newspaper columnist and the writer of many television series. He was also a noted arbiter of newspaper style and journalistic writing.

== Biography ==
Keith Waterhouse was born in Hunslet, Leeds, West Riding of Yorkshire, England. He performed two years of national service in the Royal Air Force.

His credits, many with lifelong friend and collaborator Willis Hall, include satires such as That Was The Week That Was, BBC-3 and The Frost Report during the 1960s; the book for the 1975 musical The Card; Budgie; Worzel Gummidge; and Andy Capp (an adaptation of the comic strip).

His 1959 book Billy Liar was subsequently filmed by John Schlesinger with Tom Courtenay as Billy. It was nominated in six categories of the 1964 BAFTA awards, including Best Screenplay, and was nominated for the Golden Lion at the Venice Film Festival in 1963; in the early 1970s the sitcom Billy Liar based on the character was quite popular and ran to 25 episodes.

Waterhouse's first screenplay was the film Whistle Down the Wind (1961). He also wrote A Kind of Loving for Schlesinger. Without receiving screen credit, Waterhouse and Hall claimed to have extensively rewritten the script for Alfred Hitchcock's Torn Curtain (1966). Waterhouse wrote the comic play, Jeffrey Bernard is Unwell (1989; Old Vic premiere, 1999), based on the louche life of London journalist Jeffrey Bernard.

His career began at the Yorkshire Evening Post and he also wrote regularly for Punch, the Daily Mirror, and latterly for the Daily Mail. He initially joined the Mirror as a reporter in 1952, before he became a playwright and novelist; during his initial stint, he campaigned against the colour bar in post-war Britain, the abuses committed in the name of the British Empire in Kenya and the British government's selling of weapons to various Middle Eastern countries. Subsequently, he returned as a columnist, initially in the Mirror Magazine, moving to the main newspaper on 22 June 1970, on Mondays, and extending to Thursdays from 16 July 1970. Waterhouse published extracts from the columns in the books Mondays, Thursdays and Rhubarb, Rhubarb and Other Noises.

His extended style book for the Daily Mirror, Waterhouse on Newspaper Style, is regarded as a classic textbook for modern journalism. This was followed by a pocket book on English usage intended for a wider audience entitled English Our English (And How To Sing It). He moved from the Mirror to the Mail in 1986 out of his objection to the Mirror's ownership by Robert Maxwell, and remained at the Mail until shortly before his death.

He fought long crusades to highlight what he perceived to be a decline in the standards of modern English; for example, he founded the Association for the Abolition of the Aberrant Apostrophe, whose members attempt to stem the tide of such solecisms as "potatoe's" and "pound's of apple's and orange's" in greengrocers' shops.

In February 2004, he was voted Britain's most admired contemporary columnist by the British Journalism Review.

== Death ==
On 4 September 2009, a statement released by his family announced that Waterhouse had died quietly in his sleep at his home in London. He was 80 years old.

== Works ==
- There Is a Happy Land (1957) Reissued in 2013 by Valancourt Books
- Billy Liar (novel) (1959) Reissued in 2013 by Valancourt Books
- Jubb (1963)
- The Bucket Shop (1968). Published in the USA as Everything Must Go (1969)
- Billy Liar on the Moon (1975) Reissued in 2015 by Valancourt Books
- Mondays, Thursdays (1976)
- Office Life (1978)
- Maggie Muggins (1981)
- In the Mood (1983)
- Mrs. Pooter's Diary (1983)
- Thinks (1984)
- Waterhouse at Large (1985)
- The Collected Letters of a Nobody (1986)
- Our Song (play) (1988)
- Bimbo (1990)
- English Our English (And How to Sing IT) (1991)
- Unsweet Charity (1992)
- Soho (2001)
- Palace Pier (2003)
- City Lights: A Street Life
- Good Grief
- Jeffrey Bernard is Unwell
- Streets Ahead: Life After City Lights
- The Book of Useless Information
- The Theory & Practice of Lunch
- The Theory & Practice of Travel
- Worzel Gummidge (with Willis Hall)
- The Last Page (Comedy play) 2007.
- How to Live to be 22
