= Peggy Pope =

American actress (1929–2020)

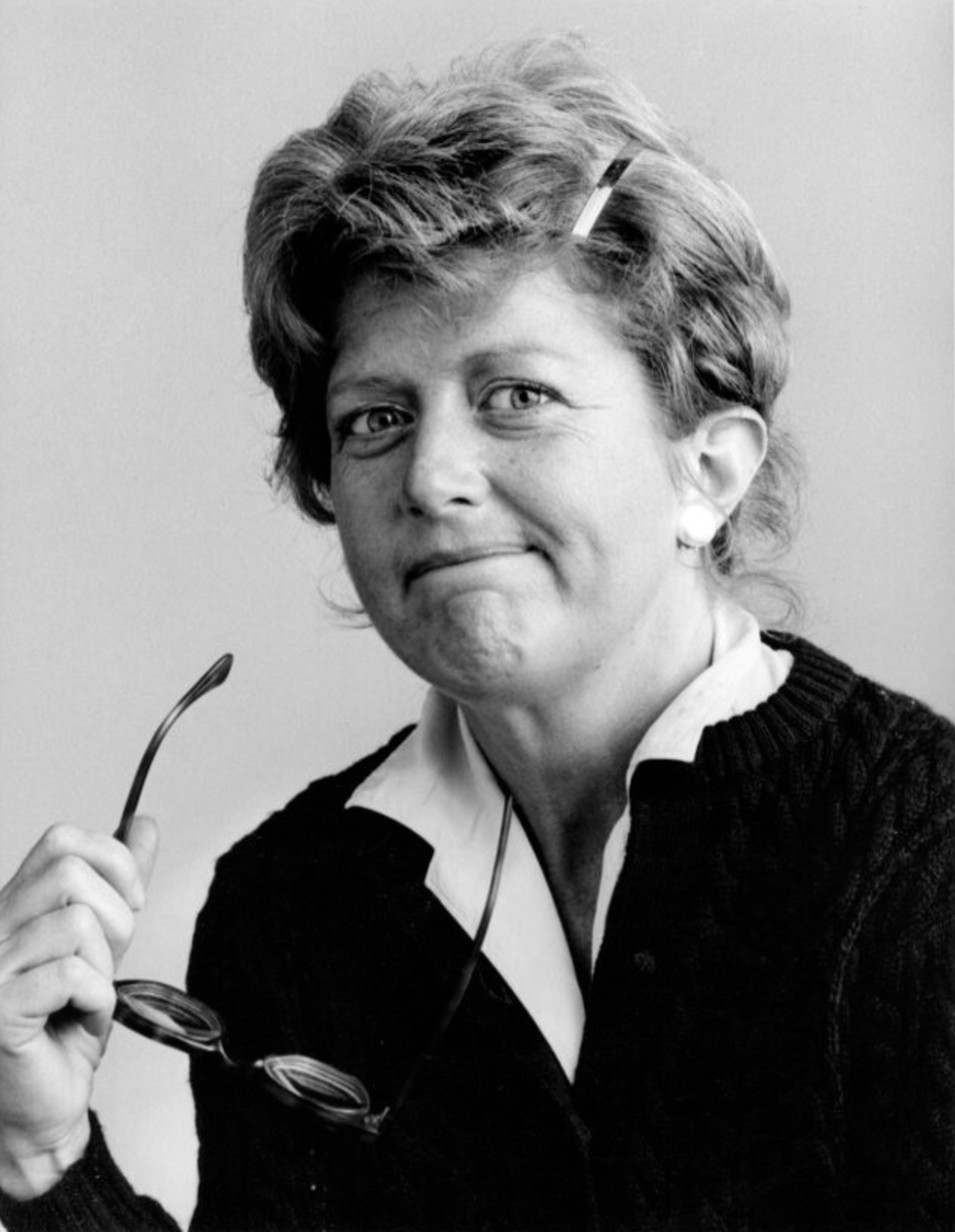
- Pope in Calucci's Department, 1973
- Born: Florence Margaret Pope; May 15, 1929; Montclair, New Jersey, U.S.
- Died: May 27, 2020 (aged 91); Fort Collins, Colorado, U.S.
- Occupation: Actress
- Years active: 1952–2008
- Spouse: William Hawker (m. 1954)

Florence Margaret "Peggy" Pope (May 15, 1929 – May 27, 2020) was an American actress of stage, television and film.

== Early life ==
Pope was born in Montclair, New Jersey. Her father was a notable doctor in the area. She graduated from Smith College.

== Television ==
Pope made many acting appearances, including in such series as The Trials of O'Brien, Bewitched, and Barney Miller. Her national professional debut came in a touring troupe of Mister Roberts.

== Film ==
Pope is likely best remembered, if not by name, as "the office lush" Margaret Foster—whose catchphrase is “Atta girl”—in the 1980 movie 9 to 5. She also had a small role as Elvira in the 1984 science fiction movie The Last Starfighter. A year later, she appeared in Once Bitten as Mark Kendall's mother. In 2008, she appeared as Sister Angela in Clark Gregg's Choke.

== Stage ==
Pope's Broadway credits include Doctor Jazz (1975), The School for Wives (1971), Harvey (1970), The Rose Tattoo (1966), Viva Madison Avenue! (1960), The Long Dream (1960), and Moonbirds (1959).

She appeared in the rotating cast of the Off-Broadway staged reading of Wit & Wisdom.

== Awards ==
Pope won an Obie Award for Best Actress in 1968 for her performance in Muzeeka. She guest starred on numerous television series, including Bewitched, Hart to Hart, Eight Is Enough, Barney Miller (in 6 episodes), Soap, The Golden Girls, Hope & Faith and Law & Order.

== Personal life ==
Pope was married once; the union ended in divorce.

At one time, when Pope was unable to find steady acting work, she and fellow actress Renée Taylor began a furniture business, refinishing and selling items that they found along sidewalks. Peggy Pope died on May 27, 2020 from natural causes, Upon her death, she was cremated at the Northern Colorado Crematory in Greeley, Colorado; her ashes were later scattered.
