= Official Americana Albums Chart =

Album sales chart

The Official Americana Albums Chart is a weekly music chart based on physical sales of albums in the United Kingdom. It is compiled by the Official Charts Company (OCC) on behalf of the Americana Music Association UK. The launch of the chart came at a time when Americana music was growing in popularity in the UK. In 2017, it was reported that sales of Americana albums in the UK had increased by 35 percent year-on-year.

The first chart was announced on 28 January 2016 on the Bob Harris Country show on BBC Radio 2. As part of the launch, the best selling Americana album of 2015 was also announced. This went to Swedish duo First Aid Kit with their album Stay Gold.

== Number ones ==
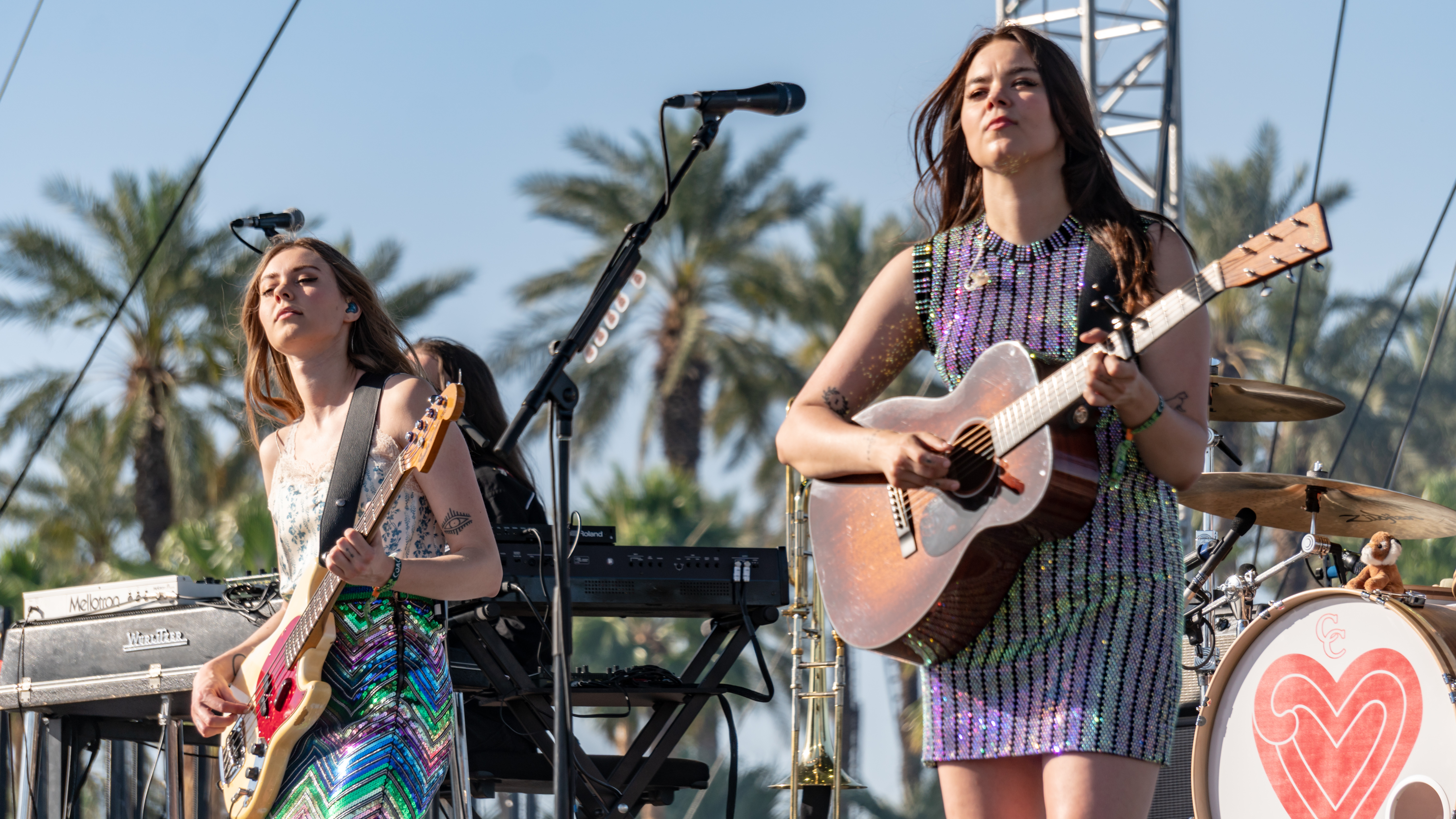
First Aid Kit had the best-selling Americana album of 2015 and their album Ruins spent six weeks at number one in 2018. Their follow-up Palomino also reached number one in 2022.

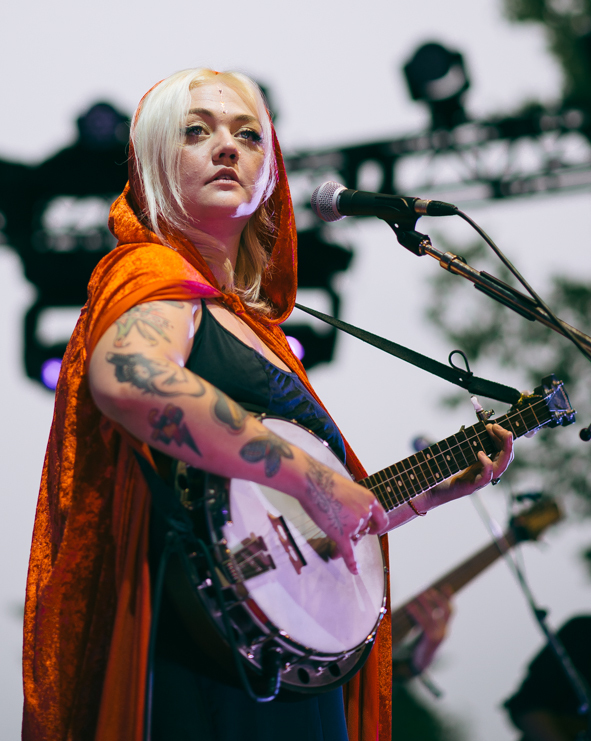
Love Stuff, the debut album by Elle King, was the chart's first ever number one. The album reached the top spot for a total of nine weeks in 2016.

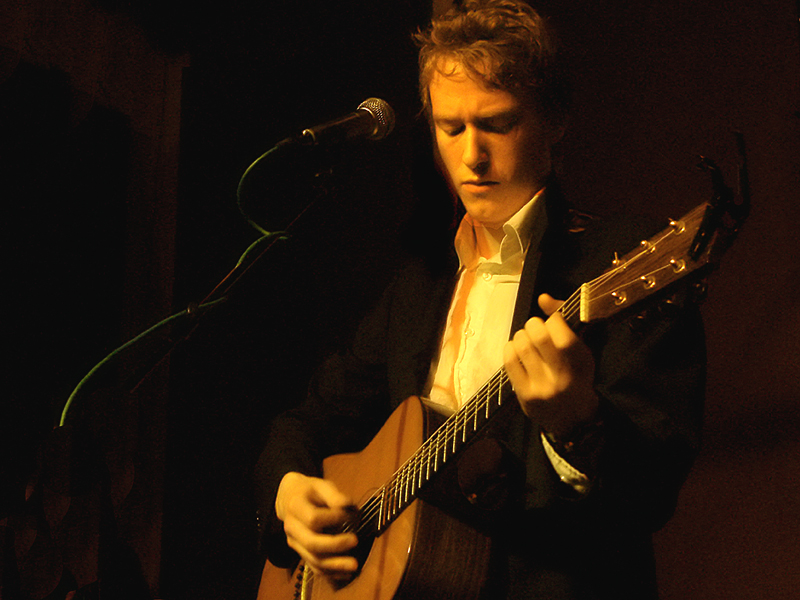
Teddy Thompson was the first UK artist to reach number one on the chart with Little Windows, his duets album with American singer Kelly Jones. His sixth album, Heartbreaker Please, also hit the top spot in 2020.

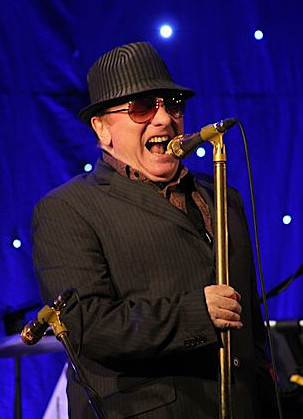
Van Morrison's 2016 album Keep Me Singing and 2019 album Three Chords & the Truth were the best-selling Americana albums by a UK artist in their respective years.

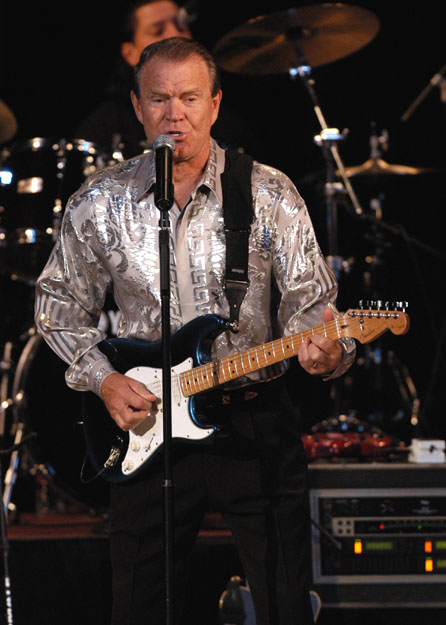
Glen Campbell spent eleven consecutive weeks at number one with his final album Adiós, which was released just two months before his death.

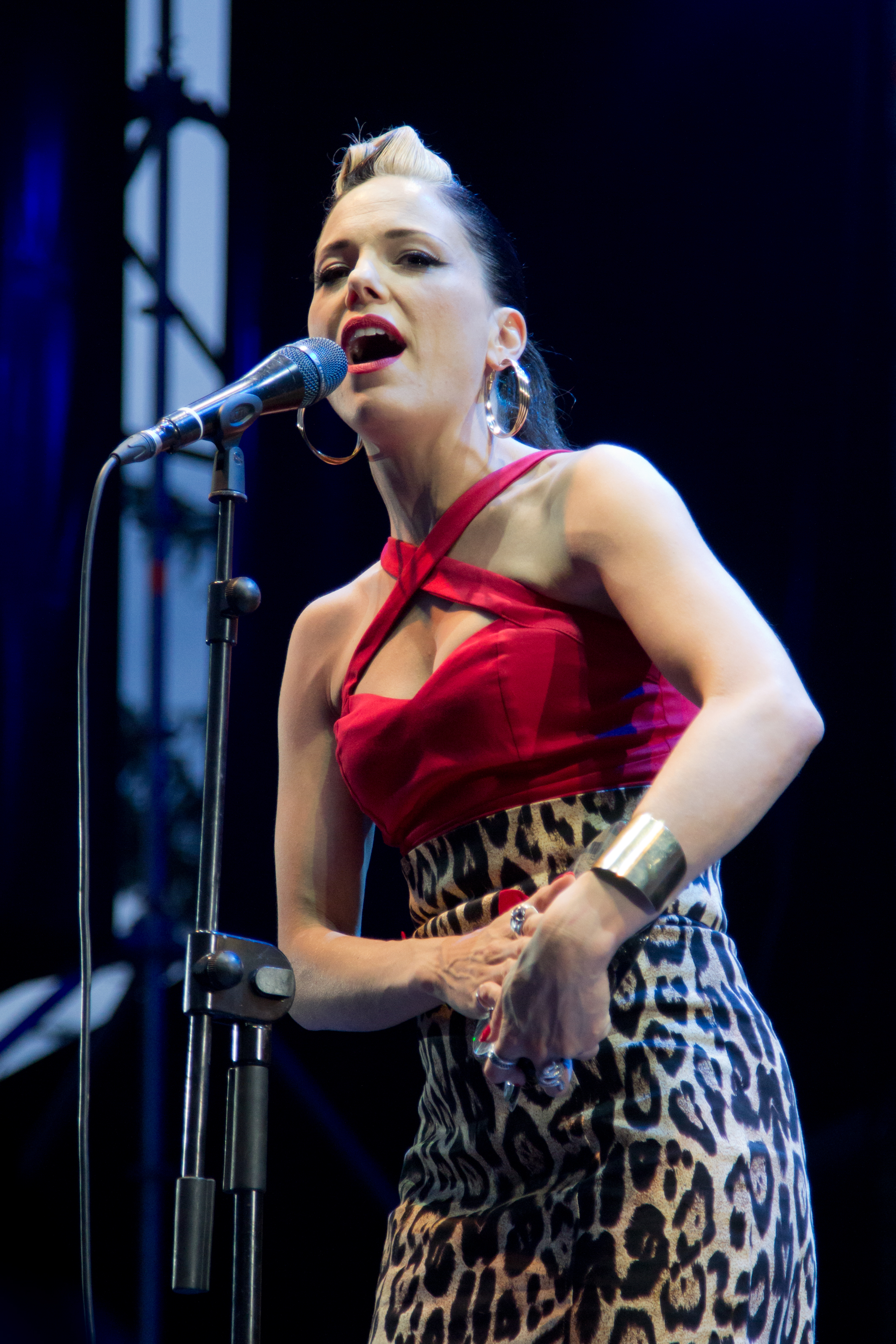
Imelda May had the best-selling UK album of 2017 with Life Love Flesh Blood.

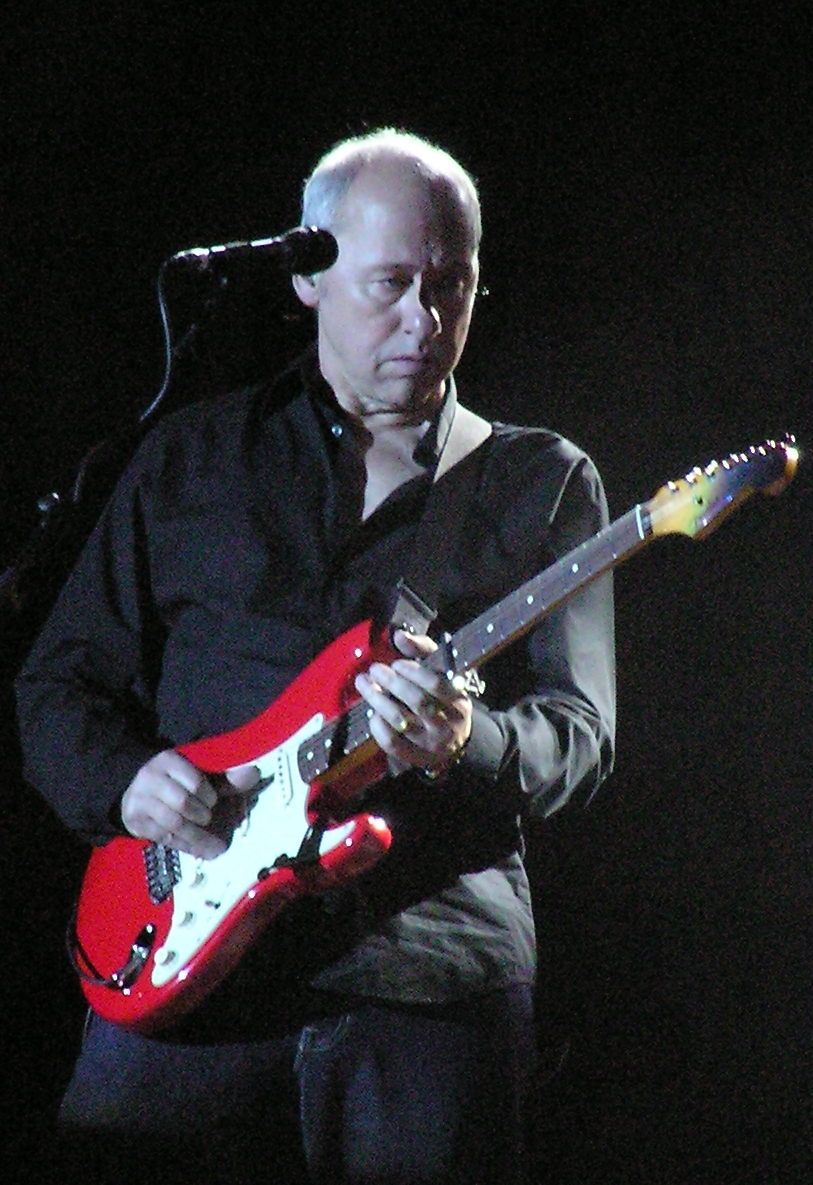
Mark Knopfler spent eight weeks at number one in 2018 with Down the Road Wherever.

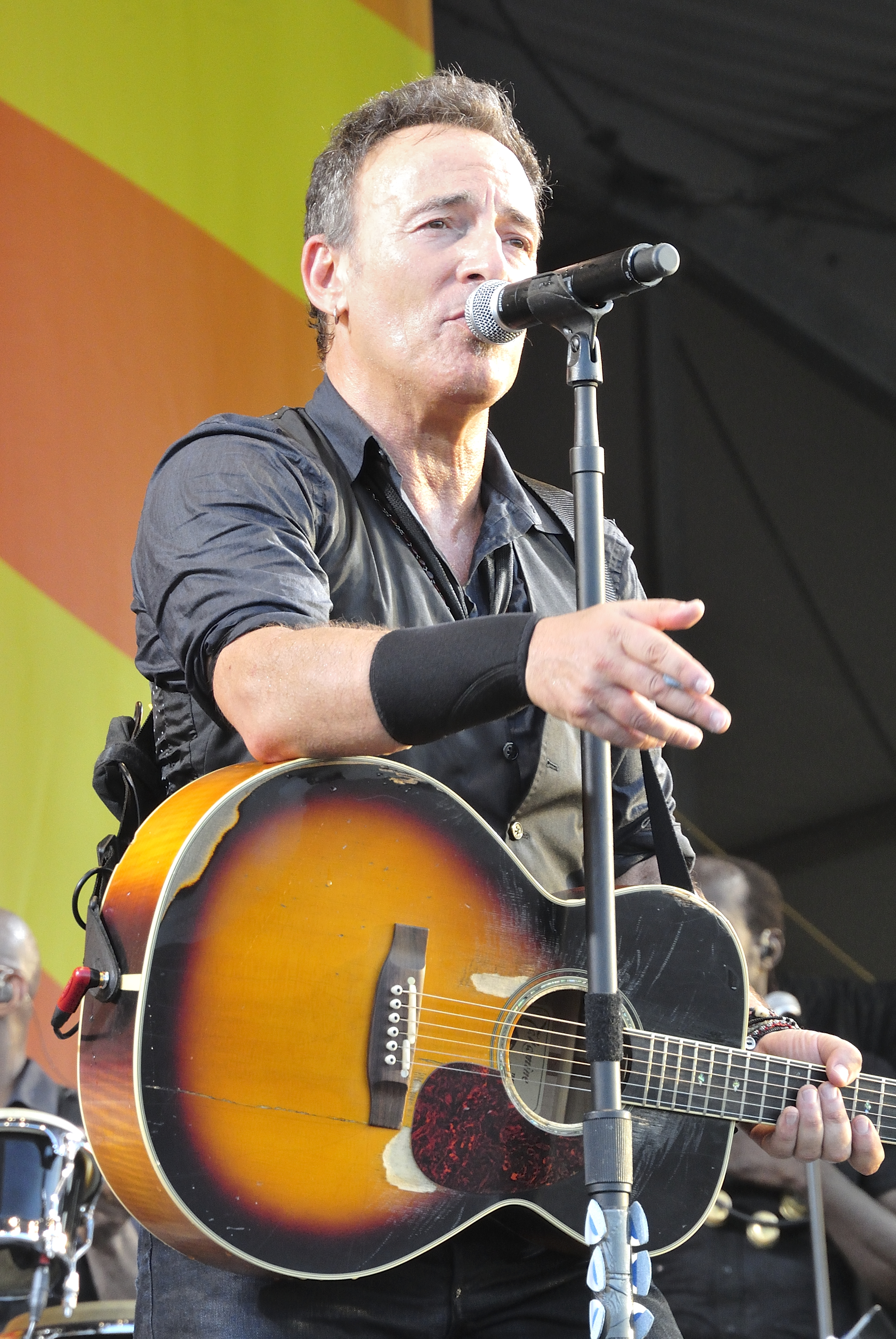
Western Stars by Bruce Springsteen spent a combined total of eighteen weeks at number one in 2019 and was the best-selling Americana album of the year. His 2020 album Letter to You was also the best-selling Americana album in the UK that year.

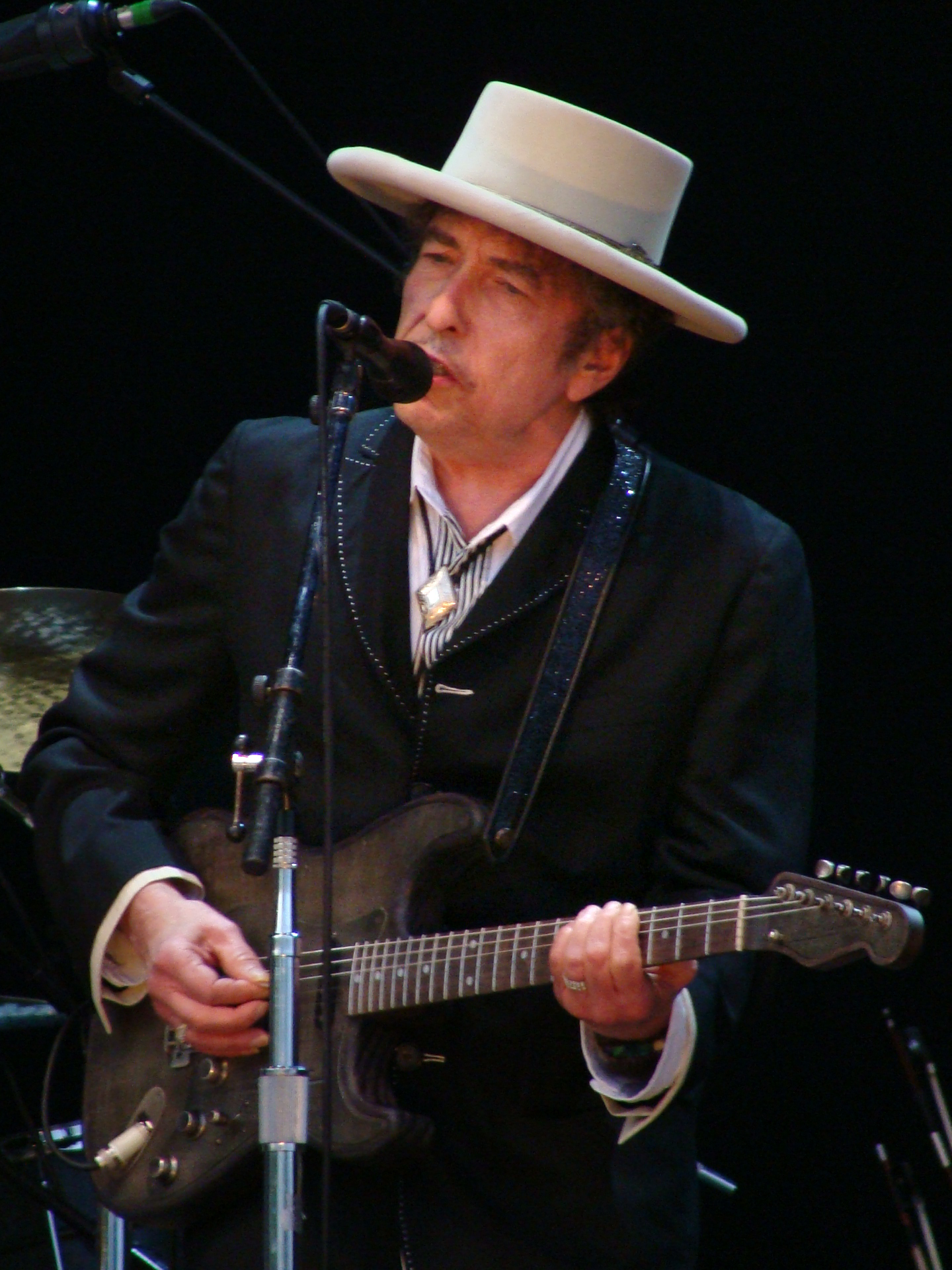
Bob Dylan spent the most weeks at number one in 2020, with Rough and Rowdy Ways reaching the top spot for ten non-consecutive weeks.

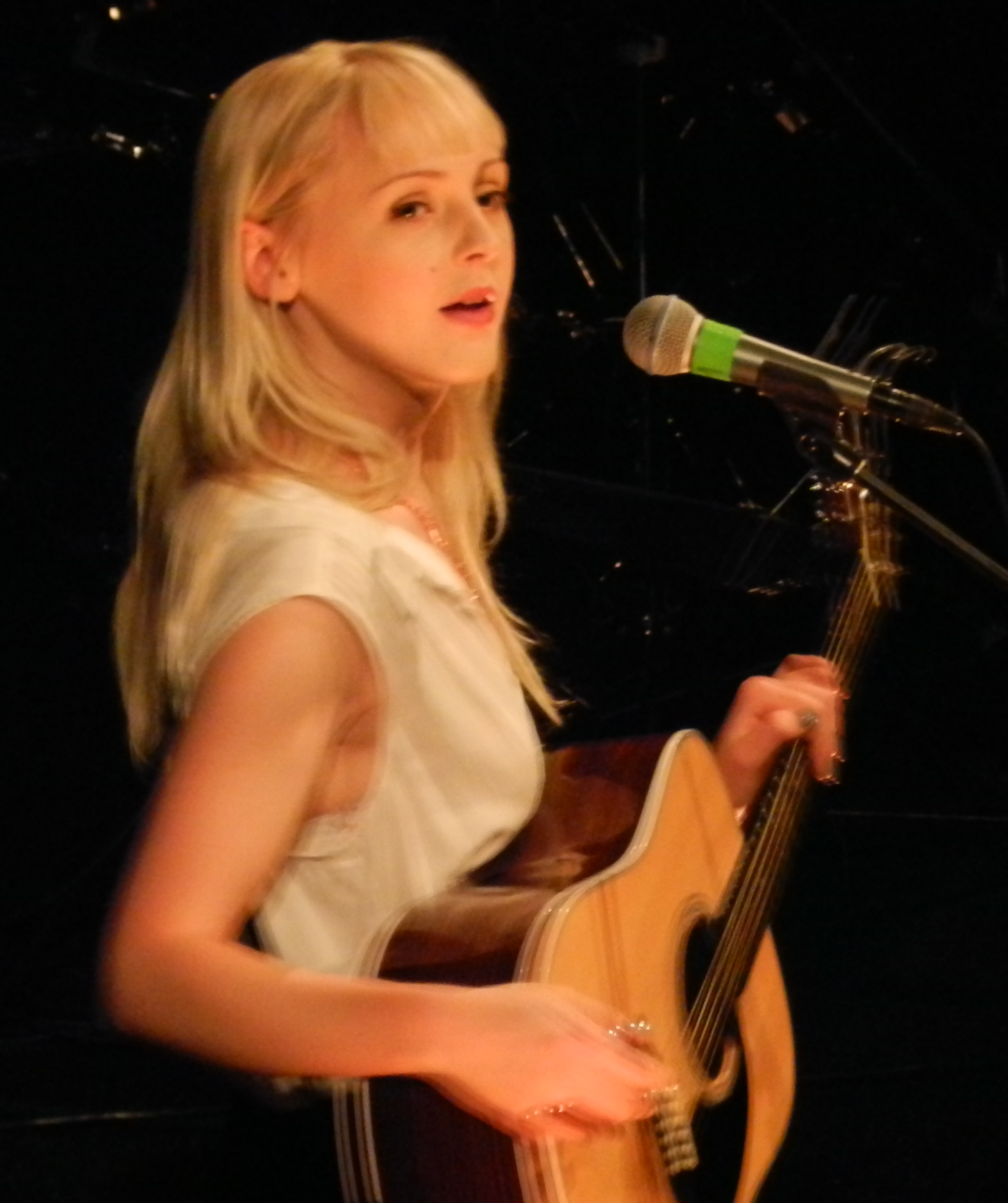
Song for Our Daughter by Laura Marling was the best-selling UK Americana album of 2020. Marling's album spent a total of six weeks at number one that year. Her previous album, Semper Femina, spent two weeks at number one in 2017.

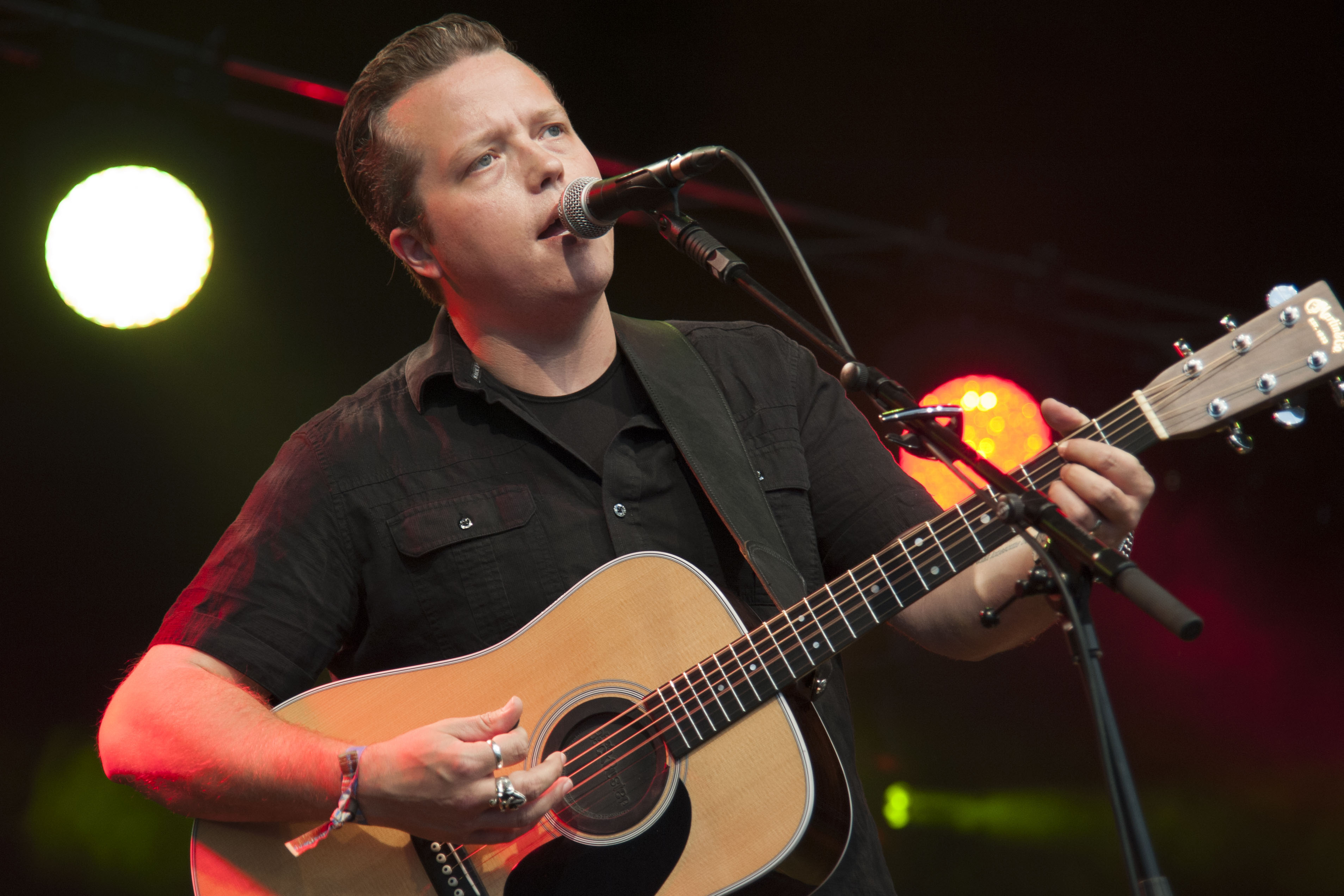
Jason Isbell's 2020 album Reunions was the 100th album to top the Official Americana Albums Chart.

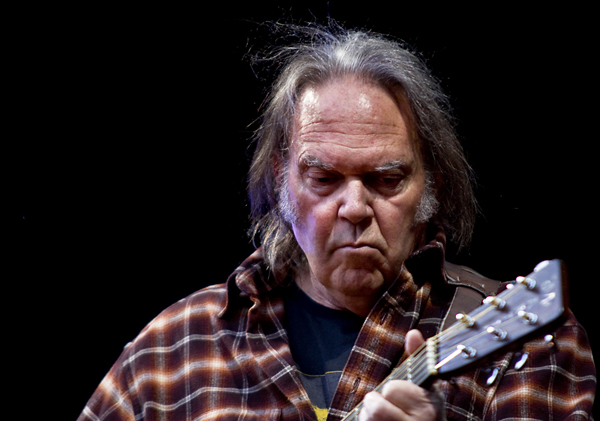
Neil Young has charted eight number one albums on the chart since its inception, including four different albums reaching the top spot in 2021.

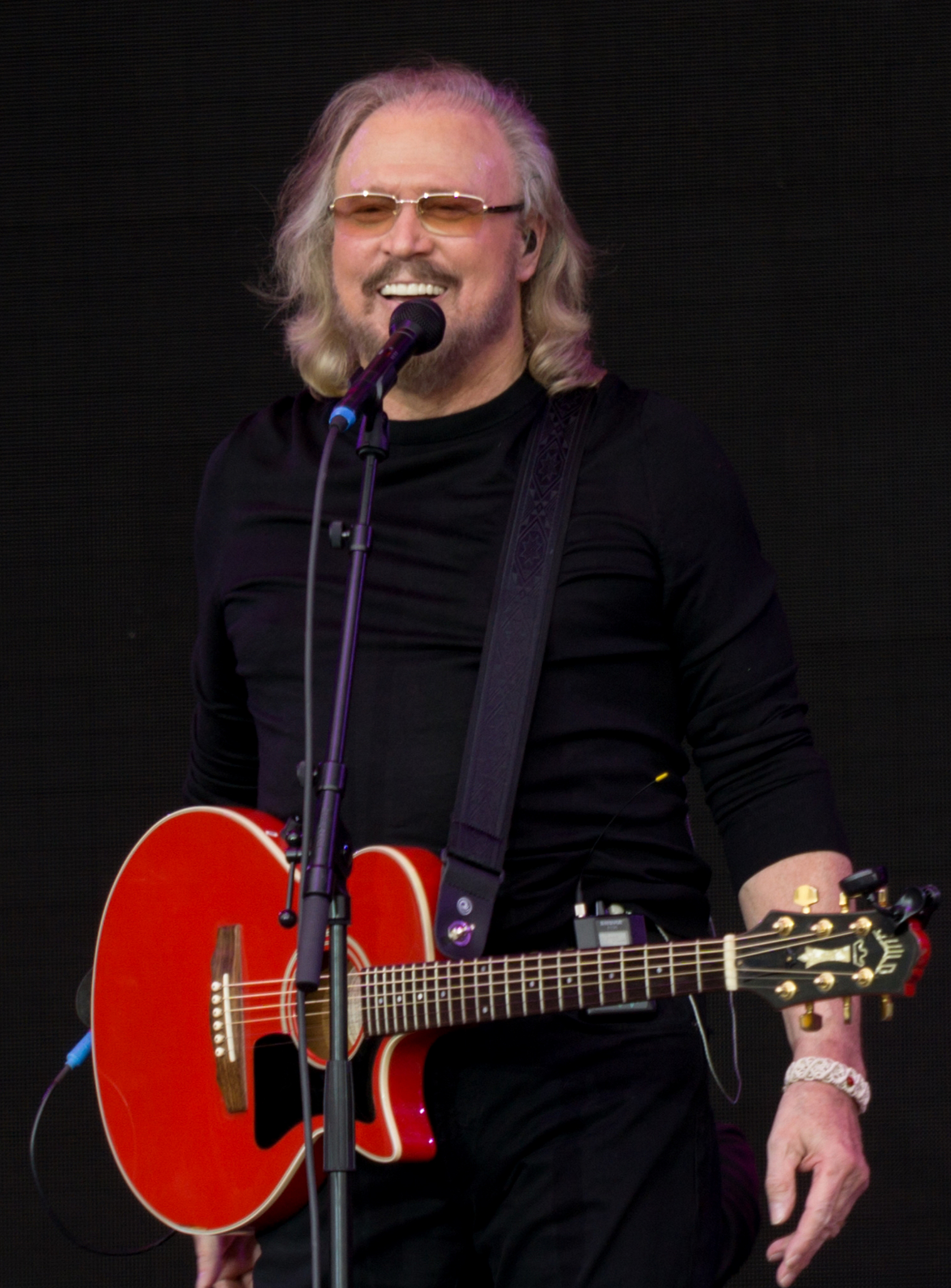
Barry Gibb's collaborative Greenfields project was the best-selling UK Americana album of 2021.

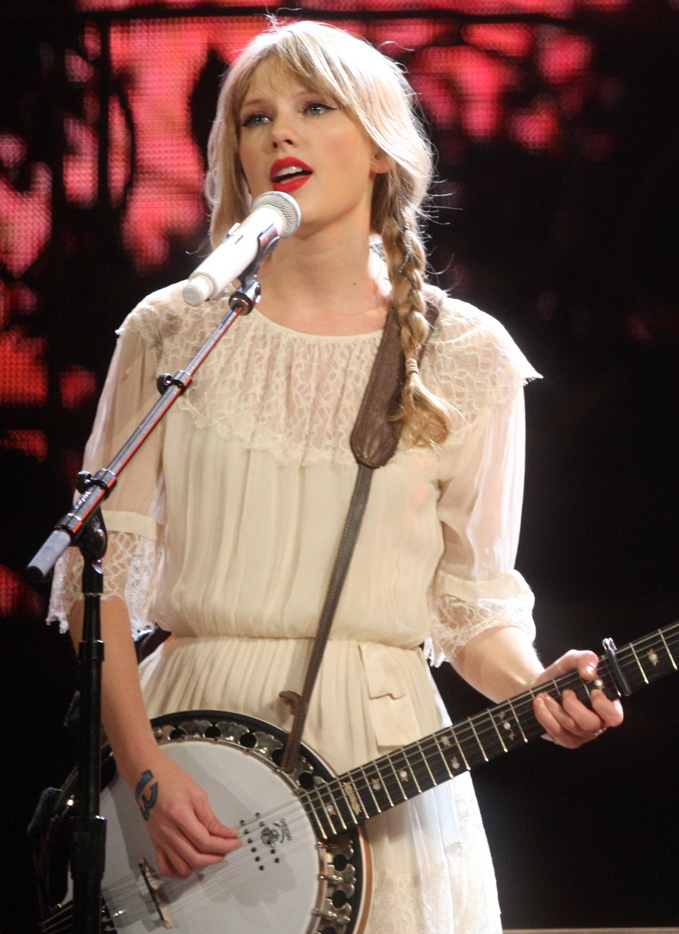
Taylor Swift had the best-selling Americana album of both 2021 and 2022 with her ninth release Evermore.

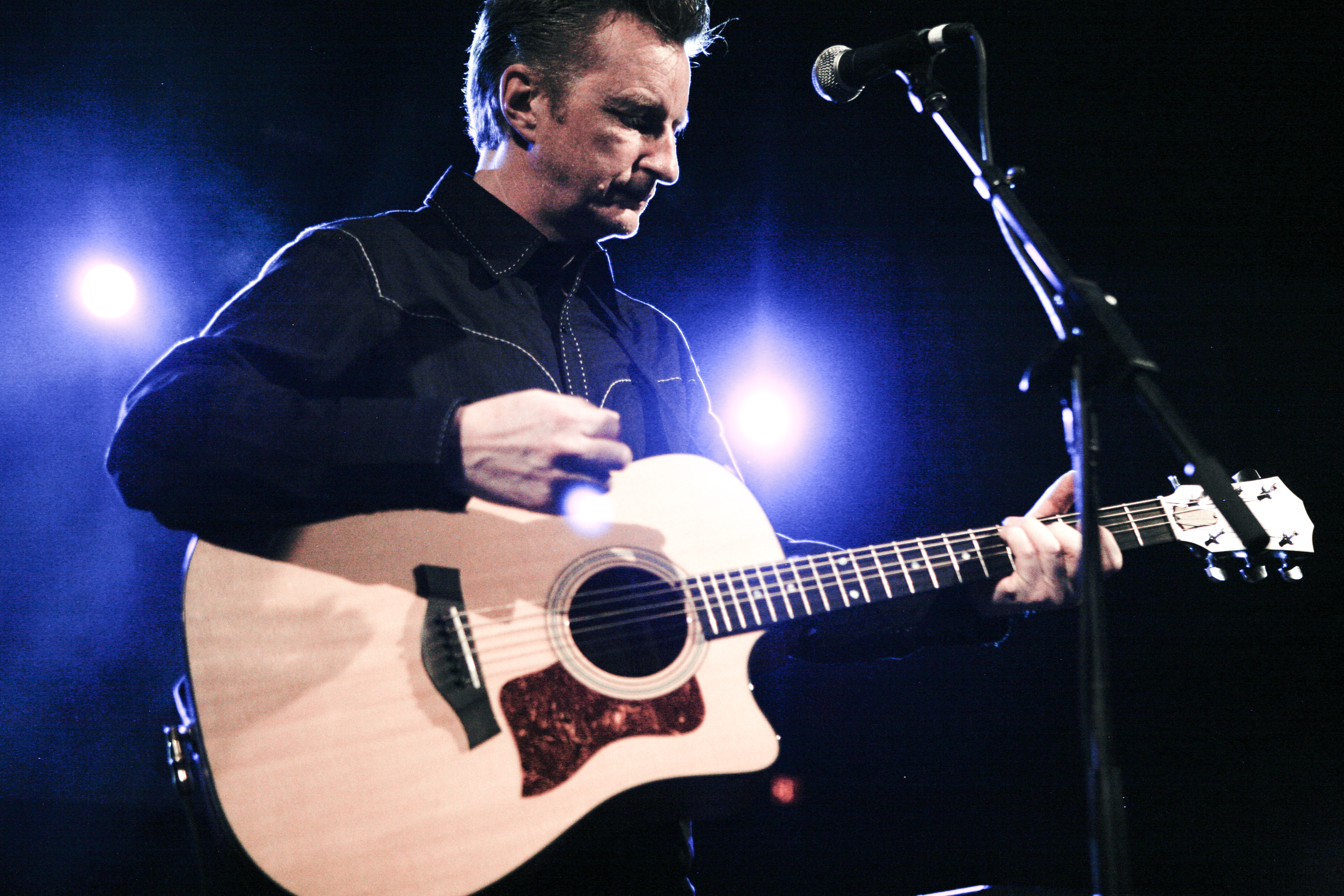
Billy Bragg has reached number one twice, and his career retrospective The Roaring Forty was the best-selling UK Americana album in 2023.

Key
No.	nth album to top the Official Americana Albums Chart
re	Return of an album to number one

No.	Artist (Note: The artist, album, date of reaching number one and number of weeks at number one are those given by the OCC.)	Album	Record label (Note: The record labels are those given by the OCC.)	Reached number one	Weeks at number one
2016
1	Elle King	Love Stuff	Columbia	29 January 2016	5
2	Bonnie Riatt	Dig In Deep	Redwing Records	4 March 2016	1
re	Elle King	Love Stuff	Columbia	11 March 2016	1
3	Brian Fallon	Painkillers	Redwing Records	18 March 2016	1
4	Richmond Fontaine	You Can't Go Back If There's Nothing To Go Back To	Decor	25 March 2016	1
re	Elle King	Love Stuff	Columbia	1 April 2016	1
5	Teddy Thompson & Kelly Jones	Little Windows	Cooking Vinyl	8 April 2016	1
6	Lumineers	Cleopatra	Decca	15 April 2016	4
re	Elle King	Love Stuff	Columbia	13 May 2016	1
7	Foy Vance	The Wild Swan	Gingerbread Man	20 May 2016	1
8	Mudcrutch	2	Reprise	27 May 2016	1
re	Elle King	Love Stuff	Columbia	3 June 2016	1
9	Whitney	Light Upon the Lake	Secretly Canadian	10 June 2016	1
10	Kaleo	A/B	Atlantic	17 June 2016	1
11	case/lang/veirs	case/lang/veirs	Anti	24 June 2016	1
re	Lumineers	Cleopatra	Decca	1 July 2016	4
12	Bear's Den	Red Earth & Pouring Rain	Communion	29 July 2016	2
13	Cadillac Three	Bury Me In My Boots	Big Machine	12 August 2016	1
re	Bear's Den	Red Earth & Pouring Rain	Communion	19 August 2016	2
re	Kaleo	A/B	Atlantic	2 September 2016	1
re	Bear's Den	Red Earth & Pouring Rain	Communion	9 September 2016	1
14	Jack White	Acoustic Recordings 1998–2016	XL	16 September 2016	1
15	Seth Lakeman	Ballads of the Broken Few	Cooking Vinyl	23 September 2016	1
16	Billy Bragg & Joe Henry	Shine a Light: Field Recordings from the Great American Railroad	Cooking Vinyl	30 September 2016	1
17	Van Morrison	Keep Me Singing	Caroline	7 October 2016	1
18	Seasick Steve	Keepin' the Horse Between Me and the Ground	There's A Dead Skunk	14 October 2016	1
19	Blackberry Smoke	Like an Arrow	Earache	21 October 2016	1
re	Van Morrison	Keep Me Singing	Caroline	28 October 2016	11
2017
re	Lumineers	Cleopatra	Decor	13 January 2017	2
20	Courtney Marie Andrews	Honest Life	Loose Music	27 January 2017	1
21	Mark Eitzel	Hey Mr Ferryman	Loose Music	3 February 2017	1
re	Van Morrison	Keep Me Singing	Caroline	10 February 2017	2
22	Ryan Adams	Prisoner	Blue Note/PAX AM	24 February 2017	2
23	Alison Krauss	Windy City	Capitol	10 March 2017	1
24	Laura Marling	Semper Femina	More Alarming	17 March 2017	1
re	Alison Krauss	Windy City	Capitol	24 March 2017	1
re	Laura Marling	Semper Femina	More Alarming	31 March 2017	1
25	Aimee Mann	Mental Illness	SuperEgo	7 April 2017	1
26	Father John Misty	Pure Comedy	Bella Union	14 April 2017	1
27	John Mayer	The Search for Everything	Columbia	21 April 2017	1
27	Imelda May	Life Love Flesh Blood	Decca	27 April 2017	6
28	Dan Auerbach	Waiting on a Song	Nonesuch	9 June 2017	1
29	Glen Campbell	Adiós	UMC	16 June 2017	11
30	The War on Drugs	A Deeper Understanding	Atlantic	1 September 2017	2
31	Neil Young	Hitchhiker	Reprise	15 September 2017	1
re	Glen Campbell	Adiós	UMC	22 September 2017	1
32	Van Morrison	Roll with the Punches	Caroline	29 September 2017	3
33	Robert Plant	Carry Fire	East West/Rhino	20 October 2017	6
34	Frank Turner	Songbook	Polydor	1 December 2017	1
35	Neil Young & Promise of the Real	The Visitor	Reprise	8 December 2017	1
re	Robert Plant	Carry Fire	East West/Rhino	15 December 2017	2
re	The War on Drugs	A Deeper Understanding	Atlantic	29 December 2017	2
2018
re	Robert Plant	Carry Fire	East West/Rhino	19 January 2018	1
36	First Aid Kit	Ruins	Columbia	26 January 2018	1
37	Beth Hart & Joe Bonamassa	Black Coffee	Provogue	2 February 2018	1
re	First Aid Kit	Ruins	Columbia	9 February 2018	1
38	Brian Fallon	Sleepwalkers	EMI	16 February 2018	1
re	First Aid Kit	Ruins	Columbia	23 February 2018	1
39	Vance Joy	Nation of Two	Atlantic	2 March 2018	1
re	First Aid Kit	Ruins	Columbia	9 March 2018	1
40	Nathaniel Rateliff & The Night Sweats	Tearing At The Seams	Stax	16 March 2018	1
41	The Decemberists	I'll Be Your Girl	Rough Trade	23 March 2018	1
42	Courtney Marie Andrews	May Your Kindness Remain	Loose Music	30 March 2018	1
43	Mary Chapin Carpenter	Sometimes Just The Sky	Lambent Light	6 April 2018	1
44	Blackberry Smoke	Find A Light	Earache	13 April 2018	1
45	Isaac Gracie	Isaac Gracie	Virgin	20 April 2018	2
46	Willie Nelson	Last Man Standing	Legacy Recordings	4 May 2018	1
47	Frank Turner	Be More Kind	Polydor	11 May 2018	1
48	Ry Cooder	The Prodigal Son	Fantasy	18 May 2018	1
49	Ray LaMontagne	Part of the Light	Columbia	25 May 2018	1
re	First Aid Kit	Ruins	Columbia	1 June 2018	1
50	Father John Misty	God's Favorite Customer	Bella Union	8 June 2018	2
51	Wilko Johnson	Blow Your Mind	UMC	22 June 2018	2
52	Ray Davies	Our Country: Americana Act II	Legacy Recordings	6 July 2018	2
53	Cowboy Junkies	All That Reckoning	Proper	20 July 2018	1
54	Greta Van Fleet	From The Fires	EMI	27 July 2018	1
55	Israel Nash	Lifted	Loose Music	3 August 2018	1
re	First Aid Kit	Ruins	Columbia	10 August 2018	1
56	Magpie Salute	High Water I	Provogue	17 August 2018	2
57	Lucie Silvas	E.G.O.	Furthest Point	31 August 2018	1
58	Passenger	Runaway	Black Crow	7 September 2018	2
59	Richard Thompson	13 Rivers	Proper	21 September 2018	1
re	Passenger	Runaway	Black Crow	28 September 2018	2
60	Phosphorescent	C'est La Vie	Dead Oceans	12 October 2018	1
61	John Hiatt	The Eclipse Sessions	New West	19 October 2018	1
62	Jason Isbell and The 400 Unit	Live from the Ryman	Southeastern	26 October 2018	1
63	Seth Lakeman	The Well Worn Path	Cooking Vinyl	2 November 2018	1
64	Pistol Annies	Interstate Gospel	Sony Music CG	9 November 2018	1
65	Charles Bradley	Black Velvet	Daptone	16 November 2018	1
66	Mark Knopfler	Down the Road Wherever	EMI	23 November 2018	8
2019
67	The Delines	The Imperial	Decor	18 January 2019	2
68	Wandering Hearts	Wild Silence	Decca	1 February 2019	1
re	Mark Knopfler	Down the Road Wherever	EMI	8 February 2019	1
69	Michael Chapman	True North	Paradise of Bachelors	15 February 2019	1
68	Tedeschi Trucks Band	Signs	Spinefarm	22 February 2019	1
69	Julia Jacklin	Crushing	Transgressive	1 March 2019	1
re	Wandering Hearts	Wild Silence	Decca	8 March 2019	1
70	Yola	Walk Through Fire	Nonesuch	15 March 2019	1
71	Tom Russell	October in the Railroad Earth	Proper	22 March 2019	1
72	Jenny Lewis	On the Line	Warner Bros	29 March 2019	1
73	Steve Earle & The Dukes	Guy	New West	5 April 2019	1
74	Weyes Blood	Titanic Rising	Sub Pop	12 April 2019	2
75	Jade Bird	Jade Bird	Glassnote	26 April 2019	1
76	Kiefer Sutherland	Reckless & Me	BMG	3 May 2019	2
77	Big Thief	U.F.O.F.	4AD	17 May 2019	1
78	Thea Gilmore	Small World Turning	Shameless	24 May 2019	1
79	Mavis Staples	We Get By	Anti	31 May 2019	1
re	Jade Bird	Jade Bird	Glassnote	7 June 2019	2
80	Bruce Springsteen	Western Stars	Columbia	21 June 2019	9
81	Frank Turner	No Man's Land	Polydor	23 August 2019	1
re	Bruce Springsteen	Western Stars	Columbia	30 August 2019	1
82	Sheryl Crow	Threads	Big Machine	6 September 2019	2
83	The Lumineers	III	Decca	20 September 2019	2
84	Beth Hart	War in My Mind	Provogue	4 October 2019	1
85	Wilco	Ode to Joy	dBpm	11 October 2019	1
86	Big Thief	Two Hands	4AD	18 October 2019	1
re	Bruce Springsteen	Western Stars	Columbia	25 October 2019	1
87	Van Morrison	Three Chords & The Truth	Exile	1 November 2019	3
re	Bruce Springsteen	Western Stars	Columbia	22 November 2019	9
2020
88	Marcus King	El Dorado	Fantasy/Snakefarm	24 January 2020	1
89	Bonny Light Horseman	Bonny Light Horseman	37d03d	31 January 2020	1
90	Drive-By Truckers	The Unraveling	ATO Records	7 February 2020	2
91	Nathaniel Rateliff	And It's Still Alright	Stax Records	21 February 2020	1
92	Courtney Barnett	MTV Unplugged (Live in Melbourne)	Marathon Artists	28 February 2020	1
93	Robert Cray Band	That's What I Heard	Nozzle	6 March 2020	1
94	Jonathan Wilson	Dixie Blur	Bella Union	13 March 2020	1
95	Maria McKee	La Vita Nuova	American Fire	20 March 2020	1
96	Father John Misty	Off-Key in Hamburg	Cripple Creek	27 March 2020	1
97	Brian Fallon	Local Honey	Lesser Known	3 April 2020	2
98	Laura Marling	Song for Our Daughter	Chrysalis/Partisan	17 April 2020	2
99	Lucinda Williams	Good Souls Better Angels	Highway 20	1 May 2020	2
re	Laura Marling	Song for Our Daughter	Chrysalis/Partisan	15 May 2020	1
100	Jason Isbell and the 400 Unit	Reunions	Southeastern	22 May 2020	1
101	Steve Earle & the Dukes	Ghosts of West Virginia	New West	29 May 2020	1
re	Jason Isbell and the 400 Unit	Reunions	Southeastern	5 June 2020	1
102	Teddy Thompson	Heartbreaker Please	Chalky Sounds	12 June 2020	1
103	Larkin Poe	Self Made Man	Tricki-woo	19 June 2020	1
104	Bob Dylan	Rough and Rowdy Ways	Columbia	26 June 2020	3
re	Laura Marling	Song for Our Daughter	Chrysalis/Partisan	17 July 2020	1
re	Bob Dylan	Rough and Rowdy Ways	Columbia	24 July 2020	4
105	Rumer	Nashville Tears	Cooking Vinyl	21 August 2020	1
re	Bob Dylan	Rough and Rowdy Ways	Columbia	28 August 2020	1
106	Angel Olsen	Whole New Mess	Jagjaguwar	4 September 2020	1
107	Emily Barker	A Dark Murmuration of Words	Everyone Sang	11 September 2020	1
108	Suzanne Vega	An Evening of New York Songs and Stories	Cooking Vinyl	18 September 2020	1
re	Bob Dylan	Rough and Rowdy Ways	Columbia	25 September 2020	1
re	Laura Marling	Song for Our Daughter	Chrysalis/Partisan	2 October 2020	1
re	Bob Dylan	Rough and Rowdy Ways	Columbia	9 October 2020	1
re	Laura Marling	Song for Our Daughter	Chrysalis/Partisan	16 October 2020	1
109	Kevin Morby	Sundowner	Dead Oceans	23 October 2020	1
110	Bruce Springsteen	Letter to You	Columbia	30 October 2020	7
111	Taylor Swift	Evermore	EMI	18 December 2020	4
2021
112	Barry Gibb	Greenfields	EMI	15 January 2021	3
re	Taylor Swift	Evermore	EMI	5 February 2021	1
113	The Staves	Good Woman	Atlantic	12 February 2021	1
re	Taylor Swift	Evermore	EMI	19 February 2021	2
114	Neil Young	Way Down in the Rust Bucket	Reprise Records	5 March 2021	1
re	Taylor Swift	Evermore	EMI	12 March 2021	3
115	Neil Young	Young Shakespeare	Reprise	2 April 2021	1
re	Taylor Swift	Evermore	EMI	9 April 2021	3
116	Kaleo	Surface Sounds	Atlantic	30 April 2021	1
re	Taylor Swift	Evermore	EMI	7 May 2021	2
117	The Black Keys	Delta Kream	Nonesuch	21 May 2021	2
re	Taylor Swift	Evermore	EMI	4 June 2021	3
118	Joan Armatrading	Consequences	BMG	25 June 2021	1
re	Taylor Swift	Evermore	EMI	2 July 2021	4
119	Jackson Browne	Downhill from Everywhere	Inside Recordings	30 July 2021	1
120	Yola	Stand for Myself	Easy Eye Sound	6 August 2021	1
121	The Wandering Hearts	The Wandering Hearts	Cooking Vinyl	13 August 2021	1
122	Jade Bird	Different Kinds of Light	Glassnote	20 August 2021	1
re	Taylor Swift	Evermore	EMI	27 August 2021	1
123	Big Red Machine	How Long Do You Think It's Gonna Last?	Jagjaguwar	3 September 2021	1
124	Gerry Rafferty	Rest in Blue	Rhino	10 September 2021	1
re	Taylor Swift	Evermore	EMI	17 September 2021	1
125	Bob Dylan	The Bootleg Series Vol. 16: Springtime in New York	Sony Music	24 September 2021	1
re	Taylor Swift	Evermore	EMI	1 October 2021	1
126	Neil Young	Carnegie Hall 1970	Reprise	8 October 2021	1
127	Johnny Flynn & Robert Macfarlane	Lost in the Cedar Wood	Transgressive	15 October 2021	1
re	Taylor Swift	Evermore	EMI	22 October 2021	2
128	The War on Drugs	I Don't Live Here Anymore	Atlantic	5 November 2021	2
129	Courtney Barnett	Things Take Time, Take Time	Marathon Artists	19 November 2021	1
130	Robert Plant & Alison Krauss	Raise the Roof	East West/Rhino	26 November 2021	3
131	Neil Young & Crazy Horse	Barn	Reprise	17 December 2021	1
re	Robert Plant & Alison Krauss	Raise the Roof	East West/Rhino	26 November 2021	3
2022
re	Taylor Swift	Evermore	EMI	14 January 2022	1
132	Elvis Costello & Elvis Costello & the Imposters	The Boy Named If	EMI	21 January 2022	1
133	Kiefer Sutherland	Bloor Street	Cooking Vinyl	28 January 2022	
re	Taylor Swift	Evermore	EMI	4 February 2022	2
134	Frank Turner	FTHC	Polydor	18 February 2022	2
135	Gang of Youths	Angel in Realtime	Warner	4 March 2022	1
136	Dolly Parton	Run, Rose, Run	Butterfly	11 March 2022	2
137	Midlake	For the Sake of Bethel Woods	Bella Union	25 March 2022	1
re	Taylor Swift	Evermore	EMI	1 April 2022	2
138	Passenger	Birds That Flew And Ships That Sailed	Black Crow	15 April 2022	1
139	Kurt Vile	Watch My Moves	Fiction	22 April 2022	1
140	Taj Mahal & Ry Cooder	Get On Board	Nonesuch	29 April 2022	1
re	Taylor Swift	Evermore	EMI	6 May 2022	2
141	The Black Keys	Dropout Boogie	Nonesuch	20 May 2022	2
re	Taylor Swift	Evermore	EMI	3 June 2022	1
142	Angel Olsen	Big Time	Jagjaguwar	10 June 2022	1
re	Taylor Swift	Evermore	EMI	17 June 2022	2
re	Robert Plant & Alison Krauss	Raise the Roof	East West/Rhino	1 July 2022	1
re	Taylor Swift	Evermore	EMI	8 July 2022	1
143	Neil Young & Crazy Horse	Toast	Reprise	15 July 2022	1
re	Taylor Swift	Evermore	EMI	22 July 2022	1
144	Jack White	Entering Heaven Alive	Third Man	29 July 2022	1
re	Taylor Swift	Evermore	EMI	5 August 2022	7
145	Marcus Mumford	Self-Titled	Island	23 September 2022	1
re	Taylor Swift	Evermore	EMI	30 September 2022	6
147	First Aid Kit	Palomino	Columbia	11 November 2022	1
148	Bruce Springsteen	Only the Strong Survive	Columbia	18 November 2022	9
2023
149	Margo Price	Strays	Loma Vista	20 January 2023	1
150	Wilco	Cruel Country	DPBM	27 January 2023	1
re	Bruce Springsteen	Only the Strong Survive	Columbia	3 February 2023	2
151	Lisa O'Neill	All of This Is Chance	Rough Trade	17 February 2023	1
re	Bruce Springsteen	Only the Strong Survive	Columbia	24 February 2023	2
152	Eva Cassidy	I Can Only Be Me	Blix Street	10 March 2023	1
153	Ward Thomas	Music in the Madness	WTW Music	17 March 2023	1
re	Eva Cassidy	I Can Only Be Me	Blix Street	24 March 2023	1
154	Noah Kahan	Stick Season	Republic Records	31 March 2023	1
155	Boygenius	The Record	Interscope	7 April 2023	4
156	Skerryvore	Tempus	Cooking Vinyl	5 May 2023	1
re	Boygenius	The Record	Interscope	12 May 2023	2
157	Paul Simon	Seven Psalms	Sony Music	26 May 2023	1
re	Boygenius	The Record	Interscope	2 June 2023	1
158	Bob Dylan	Shadow Kingdom	Columbia	9 June 2023	1
re	Noah Kahan	Stick Season	Republic	16 June 2023	1
159	Far from Saints	Far from Saints	Ignition	23 June 2023	1
re	Noah Kahan	Stick Season	Republic	30 June 2023	7
160	Neil Young	Chrome Dreams	Reprise/Warner	18 August 2023	1
re	Noah Kahan	Stick Season	Republic	25 August 2023	1
161	Zach Bryan	Zach Bryan	Belting Bronco/Warner	1 September 2023	2
re	Noah Kahan	Stick Season	Republic	15 September 2023	1
162	Mitski	The Land Is Inhospitable and So Are We	Dead Oceans	22 September 2023	1
re	Noah Kahan	Stick Season	Republic	29 September 2023	5
163	Billy Bragg	The Roaring Forty (1983–2023)	Cooking Vinyl	3 November 2023	1
re	Noah Kahan	Stick Season	Republic	10 November 2023	2
164	Dolly Parton	Rockstar	Butterfly/Big Machine	24 November 2023	1
re	Noah Kahan	Stick Season	Republic	1 December 2023	15

== Best-selling albums by year ==
Each January, the Official Charts Company releases a summary of the previous year on the Official Americana Albums Chart, listing the top ten best-selling albums of that year, including the best-selling album overall and the best-selling album by a homegrown artist.

Best-selling albums by year
Year	Best-selling album	Artist	Best-selling UK album	Artist	Ref.
2015	Stay Gold	First Aid Kit	N/A		
2016	Cleopatra	The Lumineers	Keep Me Singing	Van Morrison	
2017	Adiós	Glen Campbell	Life Love Flesh Blood	Imelda May	
2018	Not announced				
2019	Western Stars	Bruce Springsteen	Three Chords & the Truth	Van Morrison	
2020	Letter to You	Bruce Springsteen	Song for Our Daughter	Laura Marling	
2021	Evermore	Taylor Swift	Greenfields	Barry Gibb	
2022	Evermore	Taylor Swift	FTHC	Frank Turner	
2023			The Roaring Forty (1983–2023)	Billy Bragg	
