= Mood Swings (Marcus King album) =

Studio album by Marcus King
- Released: April 5, 2024
- Studio: Shangri-La (Malibu, California); Easy Eye (Nashville, Tennessee)
- Genre: Blues rock
- Length: 45:46
- Label: American; Republic
- Producer: Rick Rubin

Marcus King chronology
| Young Blood (2022) | Mood Swings (2024) |

Mood Swings is the third solo studio album by American musician Marcus King. It was released on April 5, 2024, through American Recordings and Republic Records. Recording sessions took place at Shangri-La in Malibu and Easy Eye Sound Studios in Nashville. Production was handled by Rick Rubin.

== Critical reception ==
Professional ratings
Aggregate scores
| Source | Rating |
|---|---|
| Metacritic | 80/100 |
Review scores
| Source | Rating |
| AllMusic | 3.5/5 stars |
| Rolling Stone | 4/5 stars |

Mood Swings was met with universal acclaim from music critics. At Metacritic, which assigns a normalized rating out of 100 to reviews from mainstream publications, the album received an average score of 80 based on five reviews.

Jon Dolan of Rolling Stone praised the album, stating: "the album is full of moments like this, where the lyrical conventions of a hand-me-down genre are enlivened with genuinely personal urgency". AllMusic's Stephen Thomas Erlewine wrote: "if the individual songs don't quite differentiate themselves, that's not precisely a detriment, as King is on an explicit interior journey, ensuring that his music mimics his moods. He doesn't avoid darkness, but he chooses not to wallow, finding instead a measure of peace in the emotional expression itself".

== Track listing ==
| No. | Title | Writer(s) | Length |
|---|---|---|---|
| 1. | "Mood Swings" | Marcus King | 3:25 |
| 2. | "Fuck My Life Up Again" | King | 4:18 |
| 3. | "Soul It Screams" | King | 3:29 |
| 4. | "Save Me" | King | 4:54 |
| 5. | "Hero" | King; Dan Auerbach | 3:16 |
| 6. | "Delilah" | King; Gabe Lee | 4:23 |
| 7. | "Inglewood Motel" | King; Peter Levin | 5:20 |
| 8. | "This Far Gone" | King; Tobias Jesso Jr. | 3:03 |
| 9. | "Bipolar Love" | King | 6:09 |
| 10. | "Me or Tennessee" | King | 4:22 |
| 11. | "Cadillac" | King | 3:07 |
| Total length: | | | 45:46 |

== Personnel ==
- Marcus King – vocals (tracks: 1–10), electric guitar (tracks: 1, 4, 5, 7), bass (tracks: 1, 2, 8, 11), guitar (tracks: 2, 5, 6, 8, 9), electric piano (track 2), bass keyboards (track 3), piano (tracks: 6, 11), bass guitar (track 6), keyboards (track 8), acoustic guitar (track 11)
- Kristen Rogers – background vocals (tracks: 1, 5, 9)
- Ashly Williams – background vocals (tracks: 2, 4, 7, 10)
- Herman Bryant III – background vocals (tracks: 2, 4, 7, 10)
- Porcha Clay – background vocals (tracks: 2, 4, 7, 10)
- Briley King – background vocals (tracks: 6, 11)
- Jason Lader – bass, drum machine & additional programming (track 1), Moog synth (track 3), synth (track 11), recording
- Daphne Chen – violin & viola (track 2), strings arrangement (tracks: 2, 9), strings (track 9)
- Ro Rowan – cello (track 2)
- Benny Brock – upright piano (track 3), mellotron (tracks: 3, 9)
- Chris Dave – drums (tracks: 3–9), percussion (tracks: 6, 7)
- Aaron Paris – strings & strings arrangement (tracks: 3, 9)
- Cory Henry – organ (tracks: 4, 7), electric bass keyboards (track 4), Hammond electric organ (tracks: 5, 6, 9), keyboards (tracks: 5, 7), electric piano (tracks: 6, 7, 10), piano (tracks: 9, 10), bass organ (track 10)
- Lenny Castro – percussion (tracks: 4, 8, 9)
- Kevin Scott – bass guitar (track 5), bass (track 9)
- Mike Runyon – synth (track 7)
- Justin Johnson – horns (tracks: 7, 8)
- Christopher Spies – horns (track 7)
- Isaiah Gage – cello & cello arrangement (track 11)
- Rick Rubin – producer
- Dylan Neustadter – engineering assistant
- Stephen Marcussen – mastering
- Sutton Davison – art direction, design
- Lance Wilson – photography
- Nick Leonard – photography

== Charts ==
| Chart (2024) | Peak position |
|---|---|
| Scottish Albums (OCC) | 76 |
| Swiss Albums (Schweizer Hitparade) | 83 |
| UK Americana Albums (OCC) | 19 |
| US Top Album Sales (Billboard) | 32 |
| US Americana/Folk Albums (Billboard) | 8 |
| US Top Current Album Sales (Billboard) | 27 |
| US Top Blues Albums (Billboard) | 1 |
