= Who Wants to Talk About Love? =

Studio album by Jade Bird
- Released: 18 July 2025
- Studio: Wolfgang House; No Expectations (Los Angeles); EastWest
- Genre: Folk rock; Americana
- Length: 30:32
- Label: Glassnote
- Producer: Jade Bird; Greg Kurstin; Teddy Geiger; Andrew Sarlo; Andrew Wells

Jade Bird chronology
Burn the Hard Drive (2024)	Who Wants to Talk About Love? (2025)

Who Wants to Talk About Love is the third studio album from British singer-songwriter Jade Bird. The album was released on 18 July 2025. The album is about Bird's break up with her ex-fiancée and former bandmate Luke Prosser. Bird released the single "Who Wants" from the album in March 2025.

== Track listing ==
Who Wants to Talk About Love? track listing
No.	Title	Writer(s)	Producer(s)	Length
1.	"Stick Around"	Jade Bird; Andrew Wells	Wells; Bird	2:40
2.	"Nobody"	Bird; Wells	Wells	3:04
3.	"Who Wants"	Bird	Bird; Wells	3:25
4.	"Avalanche"	Bird	Teddy Geiger	2:32
5.	"Dreams"	Bird; Greg Kurstin	Kurstin	3:42
6.	"Save Your Tears"	Bird; Luke Prosser	Wells; Bird	2:26
7.	"Glad You Did"	Bird	Wells; Bird	2:56
8.	"How to Be Happy"	Bird	Wells; Bird	2:42
9.	"Einstein"	Bird	Wells; Bird	2:20
10.	"Somebody New"	Bird; Wells	Wells; Bird	2:19
11.	"Wish You Well"	Bird; Jennifer Decilveo	Andrew Sarlo	2:22
Total length:				30:32

== Personnel ==
Credits adapted from the album's liner notes.

=== Musicians ===
- Jade Bird – vocals (all tracks), acoustic guitar (tracks 1–3, 6–8), synthesizers (2), drums (3), guitars (4, 5, 11), percussion (8)
- Cassidy Turbin – drums (1–3, 6–8, 10), percussion (1–3, 6–8)
- Andrew Wells – electric guitar (1, 2, 5–8, 10), piano (1, 8), synthesizers (1, 3), bass (1–3, 6–10), guitar (3), acoustic guitar (5, 9, 10), organ (9)
- Madison Cunningham – additional electric guitar (2)
- Drew Taubenfeld – pedal steel (3, 8, 9), Dobro (8)
- Jason Turbin – piano (3)
- Teddy Geiger – bass, synthesizer, keyboards (4)
- Greg Kurstin – drums, percussion, bass, Rhodes, Mellotron, organ, piano, guitar, strings (5)
- Eli Goss – piano (6)
- Rob Humphreys – drums (9)
- Andrew Sarlo – drums, bass, strings (11)
- Bennett Littlejohn – guitars, synthesizers (11)

=== Technical ===
- Mark "Spike" Stent – mixing (1–3, 5–11)
- Teddy Geiger – mixing, engineering (4)
- Randy Merrill – mastering
- Andrew Wells – engineering (1–3, 5–10), executive production
- Andrew Sarlo – engineering (11)
- Bennett Littlejohn – engineering (11)
- Greg Kurstin – recording (5)
- Julian Burg – recording (5)
- Matt Tuggle – recording (5)
- Matt Wolach – mixing assistance (1–3, 5–11)
- Kieron Beardmore – mixing assistance (1–3, 5–11)
- Eric Ruscinski – engineering assistance (2, 5)

=== Visuals ===
- Studio Moross – art direction, design
- Christina Bryson – all photography

== Charts ==
Chart performance for Who Wants to Talk About Love?
Chart (2025)	Peak position
Scottish Albums (OCC)	71
UK Albums Sales (OCC)	9
UK Americana Albums (OCC)	13
UK Independent Albums (OCC)	7
