= Young Blood (Marcus King album) =

Studio album by Marcus King
- Released: August 26, 2022
- Studio: Easy Eye (Nashville, Tennessee)
- Genre: Blues rock
- Length: 42:41
- Label: Easy Eye Sound; American
- Producer: Dan Auerbach

Marcus King chronology
El Dorado (2020)	Young Blood (2022)	Mood Swings (2024)

Young Blood is the second solo studio album by American musician Marcus King. It was released on August 26, 2022 through Easy Eye Sound and American Recordings. Recording sessions took place at Easy Eye Sound Studios in Nashville. Production was handled by Dan Auerbach.

The songs "Hard Working Man" and "Blood on the Tracks" made it to the Billboard Adult Alternative Airplay chart, peaking at numbers 25 and 30, respectively.

== Critical reception ==
Professional ratings
Aggregate scores
Source	Rating
Metacritic	77/100
Review scores
Source	Rating
AllMusic	4/5 stars
American Songwriter	3.5/5 stars
Mojo	4/5 stars
PopMatters	7/10
Uncut	6/10

Young Blood was met with universal acclaim from music critics. At Metacritic, which assigns a normalized rating out of 100 to reviews from mainstream publications, the album received an average score of 77 based on six reviews.

AllMusic's Stephen Thomas Erlewine praised the album, writing: "King may be letting his feelings spill onto the page here -- his originals were written in the wake of a bad 2021 breakup -- but his signature stamp isn't emotionality so much as it's enthusiasm. He gets a thrill out of cranking up his amp and trying to sing as loud as his guitar, and that's the energy that truly fuels Young Blood". Mark Blake of Mojo noted "King fulfils his promise. … His honey-rich voice and whipsmart guitar playing are the standouts here". Hal Horowitz of American Songwriter stated: "Marcus King isn't pushing any boundaries on the leathery Young Blood, he doesn't need to. His talents as songwriter, singer, and guitarist are skillfully displayed in these dozen roots rockers that any musician in this genre would be proud to have crafted with the energy, enthusiasm, and sheer professionalism he displays". Steve Horowitz of PopMatters declared: "fans of classic electric guitar-driven rock will nod knowingly when King adds a lick straight out of Iron Butterfly, the Steve Miller Band, or Jimi Hendrix. He's able to play both the song and the instrumental commentary at the same time".

In his mixed review for Uncut, Bud Scoppa described the album as "far darker than 2020's soulful El Dorado. 'Blood On The Tracks', which chugs along behind a swampy, cowbell-accented groove, provides relief from the monolithic heaviness, which becomes enervating on the generic 'Hard Working Man'".

== Track listing ==
No.	Title	Writer(s)	Length
1.	"It's Too Late"	Marcus King; Dan Auerbach; Angelo Petraglia	2:56
2.	"Lie Lie Lie"	King; Auerbach	3:35
3.	"Rescue Me"	King; Auerbach; Andrew Gabbard	4:46
4.	"Pain"	King; Auerbach	4:22
5.	"Good and Gone"	King; Auerbach; Gabbard	3:20
6.	"Blood on the Tracks"	King; Auerbach; John Charles Barrett	3:58
7.	"Hard Working Man"	King; Auerbach; Petraglia	3:37
8.	"Aim High"	King; Auerbach; Greg Cartwright	5:13
9.	"Dark Cloud"	King; Auerbach; Cartwright	3:45
10.	"Whisper"	King; Auerbach; Petraglia	3:38
11.	"Blues Worse Than I Ever Had"	King; Auerbach; Cartwright	3:31
Total length:			42:41

== Personnel ==
- Marcus King – lead vocals, acoustic guitar, electric guitar
- Dan Auerbach – backing vocals, electric guitar, mellotron, producer, mixing
- Andrew Gabbard – backing vocals, electric guitar
- Nick Movshon – bass
- Chris St. Hilaire – drums, percussion
- M. Allen Parker – recording, mixing, engineering
- Caleb VanBuskirk – additional engineering
- Jonny Ulman – engineering assistant
- McKinley James – engineering assistant
- Tyler Zwiep – engineering assistant
- Greg Calbi – mastering
- Steve Fallone – mastering
- Danny Clinch – photography
- Perry Shall – design, layout

== Charts ==
Chart (2022)	Peak position
Belgian Albums (Ultratop Flanders)	100
Belgian Albums (Ultratop Wallonia)	177
French Albums (SNEP)	166
Scottish Albums (OCC)	96
Swiss Albums (Schweizer Hitparade)	26
UK Album Downloads (OCC)	69
UK Americana Albums (OCC)	5
US Top Album Sales (Billboard)	11
US Americana/Folk Albums (Billboard)	8
US Top Current Album Sales (Billboard)	11
US Top Blues Albums (Billboard)	1
