= Carolina Confessions =

Studio album by The Marcus King Band
- Released: October 5, 2018
- Studio: RCA Studio A (Nashville, Tennessee)
- Genre: Blues rock
- Length: 48:42
- Label: Fantasy
- Producer: Dave Cobb

The Marcus King Band chronology
The Marcus King Band (2016)	Carolina Confessions (2018)

Marcus King chronology
The Marcus King Band (2016)	Carolina Confessions (2018)	El Dorado (2020)

Professional ratings
Review scores
Source	Rating
PopMatters	8/10

Carolina Confessions is the third studio album by American Southern rock/blues band The Marcus King Band. It was released on October 5, 2018, via Fantasy Records. Recording sessions took place at RCA Studio A in Nashville. Production was handled by Dave Cobb.

In the United States, the album peaked at number 58 on the Top Album Sales chart, number 19 on the Americana/Folk Albums chart, number 55 on the Top Current Album Sales chart, and number 2 on the Top Blues Albums chart. It reached number 76 on the Swiss Hitparade, number 89 on the Dutch Album Top 100, number 126 on the Ultratop Wallonia, and number 11 on the UK Official Americana Albums charts. The track "Homesick" peaked at number 26 on the Billboard Adult Alternative Airplay chart in the US.

== Track listing ==
All tracks are written by Marcus King, except track 5 is written with Dan Auerbach and Pat McLaughlin.

No.	Title	Length
1.	"Confessions"	5:24
2.	"Where I'm Headed"	4:53
3.	"Homesick"	6:24
4.	"8 A.M."	3:38
5.	"How Long"	5:21
6.	"Remember"	4:01
7.	"Side Door"	4:24
8.	"Autumn Rains"	4:01
9.	"Welcome 'Round Here"	4:21
10.	"Goodbye Carolina"	6:15
Total length:		48:42

== Personnel ==
- Marcus King – lead vocals, acoustic guitar, electric guitar, pedal steel guitar
- Kristen Rogers – backing vocals (tracks: 2–4, 10)
- Stephen Campbell – bass
- DeShawn Alexander – keyboards, organ
- Jack Ryan – drums, percussion
- Dean Mitchell – tenor saxophone, baritone saxophone, flute, horns arrangement
- Justin Johnson – trumpet, trombone, tambourine, horns arrangement
- Dave Cobb – producer, mixing
- Eddie Spear – recording & mixing (tracks: 1–6, 8–10)
- Matt Ross-Spang – recording & mixing (track 7)
- Gena Johnson – recording assistant
- Chris Taylor – mixing assistant, engineering assistant (track 7)
- Paul Blakemore – mastering
- Florian Mihr – cover art, design
- David McClister – photography

== Charts ==
Chart (2018)	Peak position
Belgian Albums (Ultratop Wallonia)	126
Dutch Albums (Album Top 100)	89
Swiss Albums (Schweizer Hitparade)	76
UK Americana Albums (OCC)	11
US Top Album Sales (Billboard)	58
US Americana/Folk Albums (Billboard)	19
US Top Current Album Sales (Billboard)	55
US Top Blues Albums (Billboard)	2
