= Something American =

EP by Jade Bird
- Released: June 30, 2017
- Genre: Indie folk; americana
- Length: 14:59
- Label: Glassnote
- Producer: Simone Felice

Jade Bird chronology
Something American (2017)	Jade Bird (2019)

Something American is the debut EP by British musician Jade Bird. The EP was released on June 30, 2017.

== Track listing ==
All tracks are written by Jade Bird, except when indicated.

Something American track listing
No.	Title	Writer(s)	Length
1.	"Something American"		3:02
2.	"Good Woman"		2:26
3.	"Cathedral"		2:50
4.	"Grinnin' in Your Face"	Son House	1:58
5.	"What Am I Here For"		4:43
Total length:			14:59
