= Latest Record Project, Volume 1 =

Studio album by Van Morrison
- Released: 7 May 2021
- Length: 127:44
- Label: Exile Productions; BMG
- Producer: Van Morrison

Van Morrison chronology
Three Chords & the Truth (2019)	Latest Record Project, Volume 1 (2021)	What's It Gonna Take? (2022)

Latest Record Project, Volume 1 is the 42nd studio album by Northern Irish singer-songwriter Van Morrison, released on 7 May 2021 by Exile Productions and BMG. The 28-track album includes the songs "Why Are You on Facebook?", "They Own the Media" and "Western Man". Released as a 2-CD set and on triple vinyl, the album marked a return to the UK top ten for Morrison, making the 2020s the fourth consecutive decade in which he has reached those heights.

== Critical reception ==
Professional ratings
Aggregate scores
Source	Rating
Metacritic	52/100
Review scores
Source	Rating
Classic Rock	3.5/5 stars
The Guardian	1/5 stars
The Irish Times	3/5 stars
Pitchfork	5.4/10
Rolling Stone	2/5 stars

While the album charted in the top ten in half a dozen countries, it received a "mixed or average" response from critics, scoring 52 out of 100 on review aggregator Metacritic. Reviewing the album for Rolling Stone, Jonathan Bernstein wrote that "Morrison's new record bears a strange resemblance to the unhinged, rambling feel of the pandemic-era internet: more often than not, its 28 tracks come across as a collection of shitposts, subtweets, and Reddit rants set to knockoff John Lee Hooker grooves." Alexis Petridis of The Guardian gave the album just one star in his review, praising the musical arrangements and performances while criticising its lyrical content as "boring and paranoid", describing the total product as "a genuinely depressing listen". Elizabeth Nelson of Pitchfork expressed a similar sentiment in her review, stating that "as with all things Van, his genius consistently shines through irrespective of the asinine context", while simultaneously describing Morrison's lyricism as egotistical and "transparently insane". Both Petridis and Nelson additionally commented on the presence of alt-right themes within the album. Rolling Stone later included the album at number 12 on its list of "50 Genuinely Horrible Albums by Brilliant Artists", calling its material "as lazy as [Morrison's] thinking" and stating that "We'd almost feel bad for the guy if he wasn’t using his art as a way to spread dangerously stupid messages about vaccines."

Ireland's Business Post said the album was "a late-career highlight" for Morrison who "displays an innate understanding of what swings with unusually direct lyrics". For Classic Rock, Morrison is "surprisingly enjoyable on (an) album of grumpy but bouncy R&B", while Artsfuse concluded that the "[prickly] and polemical tunes are surrounded by some of the most enjoyable music Van Morrison has made in years", and found it "at various points, inspired, insipid, and infuriating". Jackie Hayden wrote in Hot Press that while "Van Morrison is an angry man ageing disgracefully... [such] is the sense of confrontational immediacy, there's hardly a track that doesn't justify the price of admission". The Scotsman praised the band who "remain mellow, intuitive and freewheeling throughout".

== Track listing ==
Disc 1
No.	Title	Length
1.	"Latest Record Project"	5:06
2.	"Where Have All the Rebels Gone?"	4:13
3.	"Psychoanalysts' Ball"	5:17
4.	"No Good Deed Goes Unpunished"	3:08
5.	"Tried to Do the Right Thing"	4:42
6.	"The Long Con"	6:59
7.	"Thank God for the Blues"	5:01
8.	"Big Lie"	3:41
9.	"A Few Bars Early"	4:52
10.	"It Hurts Me Too"	3:03
11.	"Only a Song"	4:00
12.	"Diabolic Pressure"	5:27
13.	"Deadbeat Saturday Night"	3:13
14.	"Blue Funk"	4:21
Total length:		63:03

Disc 2
No.	Title	Length
15.	"Double Agent"	4:52
16.	"Double Bind"	5:23
17.	"Love Should Come with a Warning"	4:03
18.	"Breaking the Spell"	3:28
19.	"Up County Down"	4:54
20.	"Duper's Delight"	6:12
21.	"My Time After a While"	6:15
22.	"He's Not the Kingpin"	4:07
23.	"Mistaken Identity"	4:26
24.	"Stop Bitching, Do Something"	5:06
25.	"Western Man"	3:32
26.	"They Own the Media"	3:12
27.	"Why Are You on Facebook?"	4:55
28.	"Jealousy"	4:16
Total length:		64:41 (127:44)

== Musicians ==
- Van Morrison – vocals, acoustic and electric guitars, piano, harmonica, alto saxophone
- Dave Keary – electric guitar, acoustic guitar, classical guitar, mandolin, banjo, backing vocals
- Jim Mullen – electric guitar
- Pete Hurley – bass guitar
- Paul Moore – bass guitar
- Gavin Scott – bass guitar
- Stuart McIlroy – piano
- Paul Moran – piano, Hammond organ
- Richard Dunn – piano, Hammond organ, Clavinet
- Chris J White – tenor saxophone
- Alistair White – trombone
- Crawford Bell, Dana Masters, Kelly Smiley – backing vocals
- Mez Clough – drums, backing vocals
- Colin Griffin – drums, percussion
- Jeff Lardner – drums
- Teena Lyle – percussion, vibraphone, backing vocals
- Ben McAuley – percussion
- P.J. Proby – vocals
- Chris Farlowe – vocals

== Charts ==
Chart performance for Latest Record Project, Volume 1
Chart (2021)	Peak position
Australian Albums (ARIA)	41
Austrian Albums (Ö3 Austria)	4
Belgian Albums (Ultratop Flanders)	8
Belgian Albums (Ultratop Wallonia)	81
Dutch Albums (Album Top 100)	4
German Albums (Offizielle Top 100)	3
Irish Albums (OCC)	48
Italian Albums (FIMI)	43
Scottish Albums (OCC)	4
Swedish Albums (Sverigetopplistan)	29
Swiss Albums (Schweizer Hitparade)	6
UK Albums (OCC)	5
US Billboard 200	182
