= Adiós (Glen Campbell album) =

Studio album by Glen Campbell
- Released: June 9, 2017
- Recorded: November 2012 – January 2013
- Studios: Station West, Nashville
- Genres: Country, pop, rock
- Label: Universal Music Enterprises
- Producer: Carl Jackson

Glen Campbell chronology
I'll Be Me (2015)	Adiós (2017)	Sings for the King (2018)

Professional ratings
Aggregate scores
Source	Rating
Metacritic	70/100
Review scores
Source	Rating

Adiós is the 64th and final studio album by American singer-songwriter Glen Campbell. It was recorded in Nashville between 2012 and 2013. The album was released on June 9, 2017. Campbell died on August 8, 2017, nearly two months later.

== Background and recording ==
After being diagnosed with Alzheimer's disease, Campbell embarked on a 2011–2012 Farewell Tour. After finishing the tour, he entered the recording studio in Nashville to record a final album. According to his wife, Kim Campbell, he wanted to preserve "what magic was left," in what would be his final recordings.

Featuring eleven songs Campbell had long loved but never recorded, the album was made with the help of producer and longtime collaborator Carl Jackson. Singers Willie Nelson, Vince Gill and Campbell's children Ashley, Shannon and Cal also make guest appearances. According to Carl Jackson, he had to stand with Campbell in the recording booth to record the vocals "line by line" as Campbell could not remember the lyrics. However, Jackson noted that Campbell "didn't lose his melodies, and that beautiful perfect pitch and tone".

== Release ==
The album was released on June 9, 2017. The first track, a cover of the Fred Neil classic "Everybody's Talkin'", was released on YouTube and to the media on April 14, 2017. The title track was made available for streaming on May 3, 2017.

== Single ==
The only single from the album is the title track, which was released on July 25, 2017, two weeks before his death.

== Commercial performance ==
The album debuted at No. 40 on Billboard 200 with 14,000 units, nearly all of which were from traditional album sales. This is Campbell's 16th top 40 album on the chart. It also debuted at No. 7 on Top Country Albums, his 19th top 10 album on this chart. The album has sold 72,800 copies in the US as of January 2018.

In the United Kingdom, Adiós debuted at number three on the UK Albums Chart on 16 June 2017, becoming Campbell's highest debut ever in the United Kingdom. It also became his second highest-charting album there; his highest charting was the greatest hits album Glen Campbell's Twenty Golden Greats, which reached number one in 1976. Following Campbell's death, Adiós reached a new peak of number two.

== Track listing ==
No.	Title	Writer(s)	Length
1.	"Everybody's Talkin'"	Fred Neil	2:56
2.	"Just Like Always"	Jimmy Webb	3:48
3.	"Funny How Time Slips Away" (featuring Willie Nelson)	Willie Nelson	3:31
4.	"Arkansas Farmboy"	Carl Jackson	3:31
5.	"Am I All Alone (Or Is It Only Me)" (intro by Roger Miller)	Roger Miller	0:45
6.	"Am I All Alone (Or Is It Only Me)" (featuring Vince Gill)	Roger Miller	2:44
7.	"It Won't Bring Her Back"	Jimmy Webb	3:31
8.	"Don't Think Twice, It's All Right"	Bob Dylan	2:34
9.	"She Thinks I Still Care"	Dickey Lee, Steve Duffy	3:55
10.	"Postcard from Paris"	Jimmy Webb	4:32
11.	"A Thing Called Love"	Jerry Reed	2:19
12.	"Adiós"	Jimmy Webb	3:04
Total length:			37:10

== Charts ==
=== Weekly charts ===
Chart (2017)	Peak position
Australian Albums (ARIA)	55
Belgian Albums (Ultratop Flanders)	118
Irish Albums (Official Charts)	11
New Zealand Albums (RMNZ)	21
Scottish Albums (Official Charts)	1
UK Albums (Official Charts)	2
UK Album Downloads (Official Charts)	5
UK Americana Albums (Official Charts)	1
UK Country Albums (Official Charts)	1
US Billboard 200	40
US Top Country Albums (Billboard)	7

=== Year-end charts ===
Chart (2017)	Position
UK Albums (OCC)	53
US Top Country Albums (Billboard)	92

== Certifications ==
Region	Certification	Certified units/sales
United Kingdom (BPI)	Gold	116,000
