= Palomino (First Aid Kit album) =

Studio album by First Aid Kit
- Released: 4 November 2022
- Length: 39:02
- Label: Columbia
- Producer: Daniel Bengston

First Aid Kit chronology
Who by Fire (2021)	Palomino (2022)

Singles from Palomino
- 1. "Angel" Released: 22 June 2022; 2. "Out of My Head" Released: 12 August 2022; 3. "Turning Onto You" Released: 30 September 2022; 4. "A Feeling That Never Came" Released: 21 October 2022

Professional ratings
Aggregate scores
Source	Rating
Metacritic	80/100
Review scores
Source	Rating
AllMusic	4/5 stars
Clash	7/10
The Daily Telegraph	3/5 stars
DIY	4/5 stars
The Line of Best Fit	6/10
musicOMH	8/10 stars
NME	4/5 stars
The Observer	4/5 stars
PopMatters	8/10
Under the Radar	8/10 stars

Palomino is the fifth studio album by Swedish country folk duo First Aid Kit. It is their first release since 2021's live album Who by Fire and their first studio project since Ruins in 2018. The album was released on 4 November 2022 via Columbia Records and was promoted by an extensive tour of the UK, Europe and North America. Deluxe edition with 5 additional tracks was released on 7 July 2023.

== Background ==
The album was announced on 22 June 2022 alongside the release of "Angel". Of the song, the band told NME "it feels special to release a song after such a long hiatus. Today we're so thrilled to finally share our new track 'Angel' – a hopeful tune for these crazy times about accepting other people even if you don't always see eye to eye. It's also about being kinder to yourself," they added. "We wanted it to feel really big, but vulnerable at the same time, something you can cry to and dance to as well."

A second single from the album, "Out of My Head", was released on 12 August 2022. Speaking about the song, First Aid Kit stated "we wrote this song last year together with songwriter and producer Björn Yttling. It was the first time we wrote for First Aid Kit with someone else and it was very inspiring. The song was written in the spur of the moment, almost like a stream of consciousness. It's about feeling stuck inside your own thoughts and desperately wanting to escape. We produced the song with Daniel Bengtson in Stockholm. It has a bit of a different sound from our previous songs. We wanted the production to feel like an old rock song from the 80s. We were inspired by Fleetwood Mac, Kate Bush and Tom Petty. This is one of our favourite songs we've ever written, we're so proud of it and are so excited to finally get to share it."

"Turning Onto You" was released as the third single on 30 September 2022, with the band explaining in a statement "when recording this we wanted to achieve that old school 'country soul' sound. It was truly a team effort with an amazing brass section by Goran Kajfês and Per Johansson, a laid-back groove by Moussa Fadera, and killer George Harrison-slide guitar by Daniel Bengtson. Hope you like this one."

The fourth and final single from the album, "A Feeling That Never Came", was released on 21 October 2022. In a tweet about the song, First Aid Kit noted "just like the title suggests, 'A Feeling That Never Came' is a song about emptiness. Those times in your life when you expect to feel joy or sorrow, but instead you just feel numb. This was the last song we recorded for the album – originally intended more as a b-side, it has quickly become one of our favourites. We feel like the softer, quieter vocals married so well with the Marc Bolan-inspired guitars and groove. It's a soft quiet banger."

== Track listing ==
Palomino track listing
No.	Title	Writer(s)	Length
1.	"Out of My Head"	Johanna Söderberg; Klara Söderberg; Björn Yttling	3:34
2.	"Angel"	Daniel Bengtson; J. Söderberg; K. Söderberg; Yttling	3:39
3.	"Ready to Run"	Bengtson; J. Söderberg; K. Söderberg; Yttling	4:14
4.	"Turning Onto You"	J. Söderberg; K. Söderberg	3:21
5.	"Fallen Snow"	J. Söderberg; K. Söderberg	3:06
6.	"Wild Horses II"	J. Söderberg; K. Söderberg	3:47
7.	"The Last One"	Bengtson; J. Söderberg; K. Söderberg; Yttling	3:50
8.	"Nobody Knows"	J. Söderberg; K. Söderberg; Yttling	3:21
9.	"A Feeling That Never Came"	J. Söderberg; K. Söderberg	3:28
10.	"29 Palms Highway"	J. Söderberg; K. Söderberg	3:21
11.	"Palomino"	Bengtson; J. Söderberg; K. Söderberg; Ludvig Söderberg; Yttling	3:19
Total length:			39:02

== Personnel ==
First Aid Kit

- Klara Söderberg – vocals, guitar, handclapping
- Johanna Söderberg – vocals, handclapping

Additional musicians

- Erik Arvinder – arranger, conductor
- Daniel Bengtson – arranger, autoharp, engineer, guitar, handclapping, harp, harpsichord, juno, mellotron, mixing, percussion, piano, producer, strings, synthesizer, backing vocals, whistle, wurlitzer
- Willem Bleeker – string arrangements
- Claudia Bonfiglioli – violin
- Daniele Bonfiglioli – violin
- Kyle Crane – congas, drums, percussion, toms
- Bard Ericson – double bass
- Mousa Fadera – drums, percussion
- Jannika Gustafsson – violin
- Pelle Hanson – cello
- Merit Hemmingson – organ
- Per "Texas" Johansson – flute, saxophone
- Goran Kajfes – trumpet
- Jakob Koranyi – cello
- Lisa Langbacka – accordion
- Ylva Larsdotter – violin
- Daniel Migdal – violin
- Christopher Öhman – viola
- Vicki Powell – viola
- Riikka Repo – viola
- Lisa Rydberg – violin
- Aleksander Sätterström – violin
- Amalie Stalheim – cello
- Anna Stefansson – violin
- Martin Stensson – violin
- Patrik Swedrup – violin
- Fredrik Syberg – violin
- Paul Waltman – violin
- Ylvali Zilliacus – viola

Technical

- Daniel Benston – production
- Eric Boulanger – engineering
- Tom Elmhirst – mixing, programming
- Adam Hong – mixing
- Niclas Lidström – engineering
- Simon Nordberg – mixing
- Chris Sorem – drum engineering

Artwork

- Olof Grind – photography
- Lisa Sander – artwork
- Emy Storey – design

== Charts ==
Chart performance for Palomino
Chart (2022)	Peak position
Belgian Albums (Ultratop Flanders)	43
Belgian Albums (Ultratop Wallonia)	165
Dutch Albums (Album Top 100)	35
Finnish Albums (Suomen virallinen lista)	31
French Physical Albums (SNEP)	117
German Albums (Offizielle Top 100)	57
Norwegian Albums (VG-lista)	37
Scottish Albums (OCC)	1
Swedish Albums (Sverigetopplistan)	3
Swiss Albums (Schweizer Hitparade)	40
UK Albums (OCC)	3
US Folk Albums (Billboard)	12
