= The Marcus King Band =

American rock band

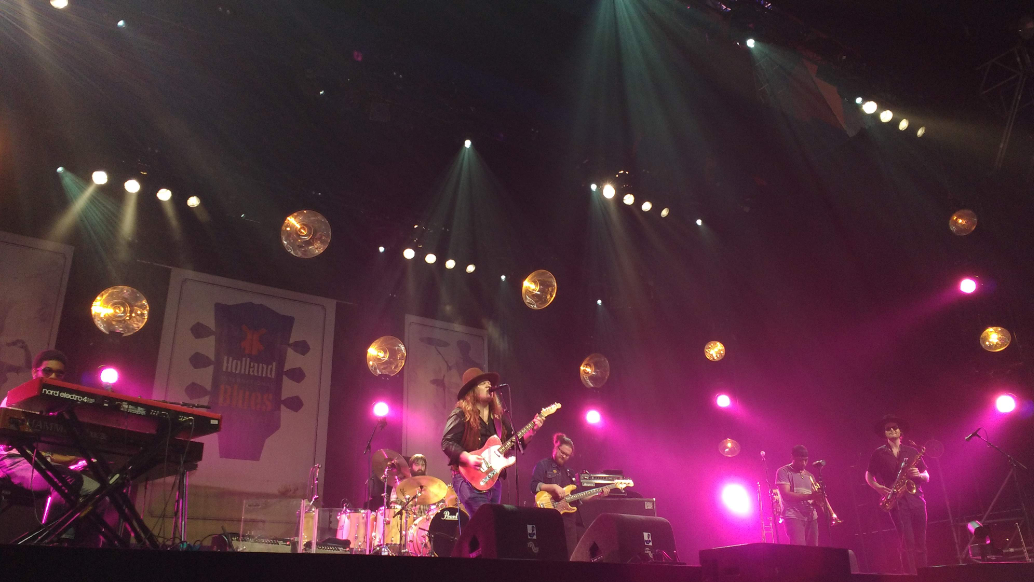

Background information
- Origin: Greenville, South Carolina, U.S.
- Genres: Blues rock; southern rock
- Years active: 2013–present
- Label: Fantasy
- Website: marcuskingband.com

The Marcus King Band is an American rock band from South Carolina formed in 2013.

== History ==
The band is led by guitarist Marcus King. Raised in Greenville, South Carolina, King was brought up on the blues, playing shows as a pre-teen sideman with his father, the fellow bluesman Marvin King. The band includes drummer Jack Ryan, bassist Stephen Campbell, and guitarist Drew Smithers. Touring musicians consist of saxophonist Chris Spies, and keyboard player, Mike Runyon.

The Marcus King Band released their debut album, Soul Insight on October 30, 2015, on Warren Haynes' Evil Teen Records. Soul Insight reached #8 on the Billboard Blues Albums Chart.

The band's second full-length LP and first album for Fantasy Records, The Marcus King Band, was released on October 7, 2016. The album was produced by Haynes and recorded at Carriage House Studios in Stamford, Connecticut. The Marcus King Band reached No. 2 on the Billboard Blues Albums Chart.

On August 22, 2018, it was announced the band would release their third full-length LP, Carolina Confessions, on October 5, 2018, via Fantasy Records. The album was recorded at RCA Studio A in Nashville and produced and mixed by Dave Cobb. While not entering the Billboard 200, it was the band's first entry on the magazine's US Top Current Albums chart, peaking at No. 55, and was another No. 2 hit on the Blues chart for them. The album also reached No. 2 on the Heatseekers Albums chart.

== Discography ==
=== Albums ===
- Soul Insight (2015) No. 8 Blues Albums Chart
- The Marcus King Band (2016) No. 2 Blues Albums Chart
- Carolina Confessions (2018) No. 2 Blues Albums Chart
- Darling Blue (2025)

=== EPs ===
- Due North EP (2017) No. 2 Blues Album Chart

=== Singles ===
- "Homesick" (2018) No. 26 Adult Alternative Songs
