= Jade Bird =

English singer (born 1997)

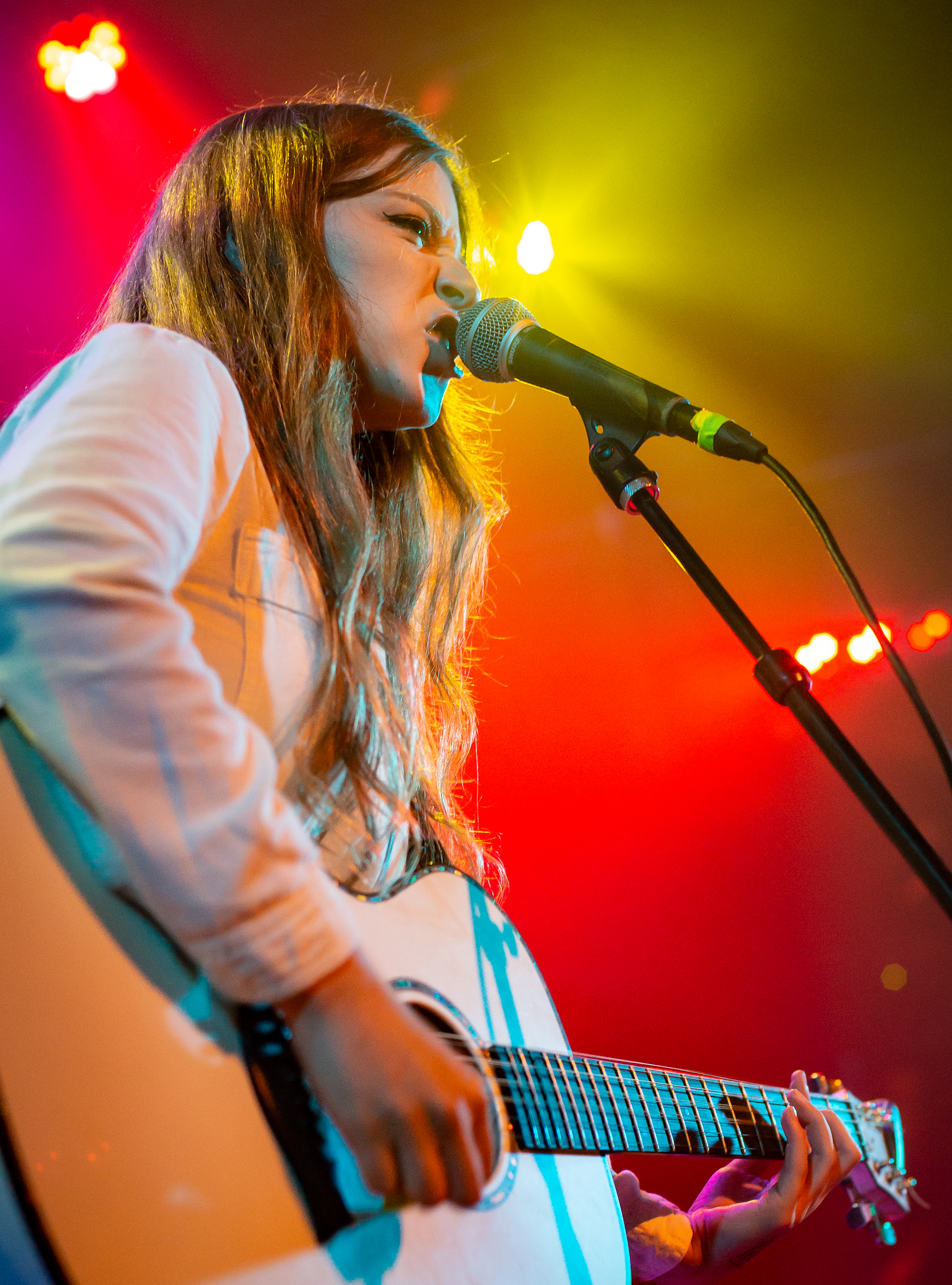
- Bird in 2018

Background information
- Born: Jade Elizabeth Bird; 1 October 1997 (age 29); Hexham, Northumberland, England
- Origin: Croydon, South London
- Genres: Americana; indie; folk; rock; country; alt-country
- Occupations: Singer; songwriter; musician
- Instruments: Vocals; guitar; piano
- Years active: 2015–present
- Label: Glassnote
- Website: jade-bird.com

Jade Elizabeth Bird (born 1 October 1997) is an English singer, songwriter and musician. Bird's music has been influenced by many folk and Americana artists. The media, when describing Bird's music, have drawn comparisons with pop, Americana, country and folk rock.

Bird's childhood was spent in Hexham, London, Germany and Bridgend, South Wales. It was in Bridgend, living with her mother following the separation of her parents, that Bird began to write songs. In her final year at BRIT School, she recorded a demo that led to a management deal. This, in turn, was followed by her signing to Glassnote Records. In 2017, she released her first extended play (EP) titled Something American. This received a positive reception and she was listed in the BBC Sound of 2018 list at the end of that year.

In 2018, she released the song "Lottery", which topped the Adult Alternative Songs, making her the fifth female solo artist to top that chart since 2010. The release of her eponymous debut studio album, in 2019, was met with a largely positive reception from critics. Her accolades include nominations at the Americana Music Honors & Awards and NME Awards and winning the award for International Breakthrough artist at the AIM Independent Music Awards in 2019. In 2020, amidst the COVID-19 pandemic, Bird was the first artist to collaborate with Microsoft in what was named the RE:Surface project, a virtual live-streamed concert. In August 2021, she released her second album Different Kinds of Light.

== Early life ==
Jade Elizabeth Bird was born in Hexham, Northumberland. Bird and her family moved to London when she was two years old, and lived on a military base in Germany when she was five. She later moved to Bridgend, South Wales, with her mother, after the divorce of her parents, which occurred when Bird was seven or eight. It was during this time in Wales, living with her mother and grandmother (who had also been through a divorce), that Bird began to write songs. At age 16, Bird began attending the BRIT School in Croydon, which she graduated from in 2016. While at the BRIT School, she performed at concerts several times a week.

== Career ==
=== 2017–2018: First EP and singles ===
While in her final year at BRIT School, Bird recorded a demo of 13 tracks in her friend's bathroom, which would later bring her a management deal. Soon after the management deal, she signed to Glassnote Records. In 2017, she was sent to tour the United States with Brent Cobb. She played a showcase event at South by Southwest in Austin, Texas in March 2017 and later in the year she opened for First Aid Kit, Son Little and London Grammar. In 2017, Bird won the ANCHOR 2017 award of the Reeperbahn Festival in Hamburg.

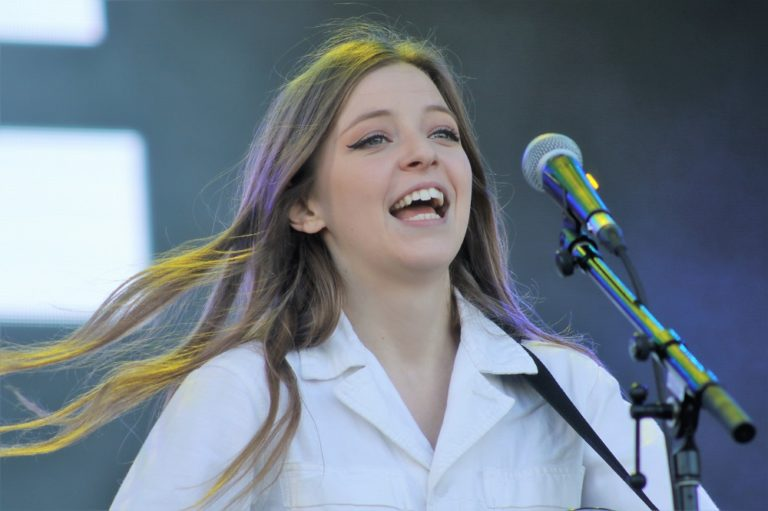
Bird performing in 2018

Also in 2017, Bird recorded her debut extended play (EP), Something American, in Rhinebeck, Boiceville and Palenville, all in New York. It was produced by Simon Felice, of The Felice Brothers and David Baron, and featured guitarist Will Rees, drummer Matt Johnson and guitarist Larry Campbell, and was released that same year. The EP received a positive reception from a number of critics. Stephanie Penman commented that the songs were "musical masterpieces" and Amanda Erwin stated "[it is] no surprise Bird has found a concrete voice of her own so quickly, unafraid to bare her raw emotions on each track." The Line of Best Fit called the EP "a vibrant collection of folk and country-tinged songs". She finished 2017 by appearing as a finalist for the BBC Sound Of award for 2018.

A year after releasing her debut EP, she released her debut single "Lottery", a punk-influenced song with romantic lyrical themes. The song went to the top of the Adult Alternative Songs and remained there for three weeks. This made her only the fifth female solo artist to top that chart since 2010. On 31 July 2018, Bird released her second single from what would be her debut studio album. The song, entitled "Uh Huh", was accompanied by a video directed by Kate Moross. Atwood Magazine noted some lyrical similarities with the previous single "Lottery" but also mentioned that the song demonstrated hard rock influences throughout. In November, she released another single from the album, "Love Has All Been Done Before", and finished off the year with a tour of the UK and Republic of Ireland.

=== 2019: Jade Bird ===
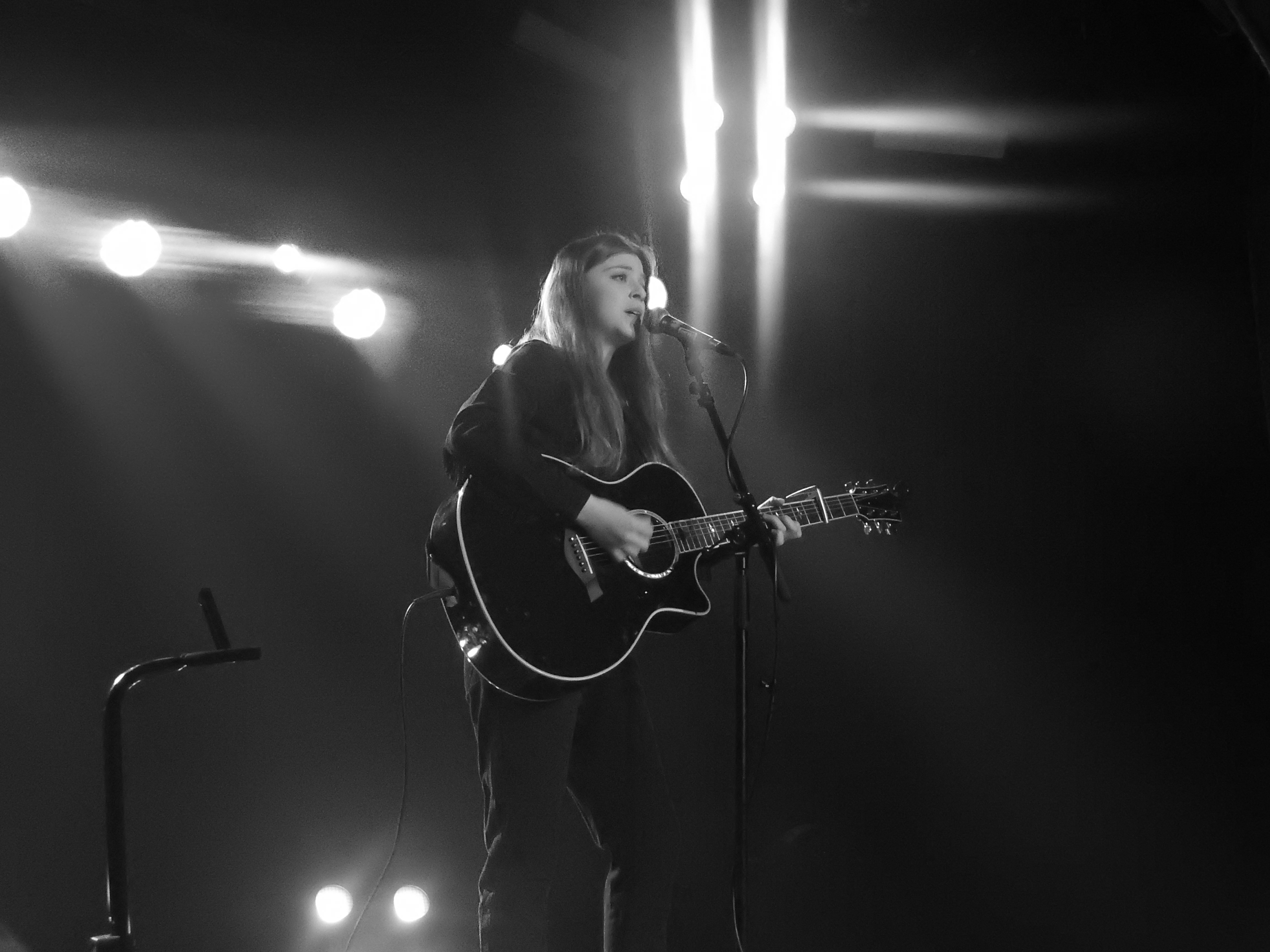
Bird performing in 2019 in London

After announcing the release date for her upcoming album, Bird released "I Get No Joy", the fourth single from that album. The upbeat rock song was described by Bird as being influenced by "the stream of thought that runs through your head at all times as an overthinker". It was accompanied by a music video, directed by Jamie Thraves. Her debut was recorded at Clubhouse Studios in Rhinebeck, NY, Sun Mountain Studios in Boiceville, NY, and Barn Studio in Palenville, NY. Simone Felice and David Baron producing. David Baron and Peter Hanlon engineering. David Baron and Mark “Spike” Stent mixing. In preparation for its release, Bird toured with Irish singer-songwriter Hozier, playing in venues such as the Mahaffey Theater, The Fillmore and Ovens Auditorium, gaining positive attention from American music critics. On 19 April 2019, she released her debut album, Jade Bird. The album received a Metacritic score of 75 based on 14 reviews, indicating generally favourable reviews from several major publications. NME called the entire album "a triumph" while Clash led with labelling Jade Bird as "[an] assured debut from a force to be reckoned with". A review in Paste was slightly more critical of the album, "Jade Bird is an album of loose change, a pocketful of shiny, well-written nuggets that might give off a lot of flash individually but when put together don't equal the sum of their parts." The release of the album was followed by a nomination for Emerging Act Of The Year in the 2019 Americana Music Honors & Awards. On 24 July, it was announced that Bird had been nominated for three awards at the AIM Independent Music Awards. Only Idles were nominated for more awards at this event. She ended up winning the award for International Breakthrough artist.

=== 2020–2022: Different Kinds of Light ===
Nine months after releasing her debut album, the follow-up album was written and completed while Bird was in New York. Following the cancellation of her 2020 tour, due to the COVID-19 pandemic, Bird collaborated with Microsoft and was the first artist to take part in their RE:Surface project, a virtual live-streamed concert, on 29 May 2020. Months later, in October, she then headlined another live-streamed concert. This one was called Come Together Mental Health Music Festival and was for the benefit of the National Alliance on Mental Illness. On 4 November, Bird released "Headstart", the first single from her second studio album. The song, produced by Dave Cobb, is an indie song about an infatuation that is not returned. This was followed up by "Houdini" on 26 November, a song based on the disappearance of someone from her life. Bird's first release of 2021 was the single "Open Up The Heavens", from her upcoming second studio album. This song, which ABC Online described as "one of Bird's finest pieces yet", was the last to be recorded for that album. On 16 April, Bird released her second EP, RCA Studio A Sessions. Her second album, Different Kinds of Light, was announced on 20 May and released on 13 August. The album, produced by Dave Cobb, was written in Japan, Mexico, Nashville and New York and contains inspiration from Bird's own life experiences as well as fictional characters from her imagination.

=== 2023–present: Burn the Hard Drive EP and Who Wants to Talk About Love ===
In early 2024, Bird released her third EP, Burn the Hard Drive, while revealing that she had split from her fiancée and touring guitarist. During the year, Bird embarked upon her Open Up the Songbook where she played new songs from her then-unannounced third studio album Who Wants to Talk About Love?. In April 2025, the album was officially announced for release on 18 July.

== Artistry ==
=== Influences ===
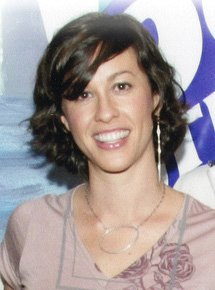
Bird has frequently cited Alanis Morissette (pictured) as an influence

Bird was introduced to American and Canadian singer-songwriters by a family friend; this included Neil Young, Crosby, Stills, Nash & Young, Bob Dylan and Joni Mitchell. She took up guitar herself at this point, a time that also coincided with the separation of her parents. Bird commented, "I needed a vent, so I think that’s ultimately why I got into music so heavily, because of these transitions, so to speak". Also while learning to play guitar as a teenager, she was drawn towards Dolly Parton and The Civil Wars. The Civil Wars was the first Americana artist that Bird listened to. Music Week stated that she regarded Patti Smith and Alanis Morissette highly and, in an interview with Billboard, she opined that Morissette's Jagged Little Pill is her favourite album ever.

=== Musical style and songwriting ===
Rolling Stone described Bird's vocals as "raw and robust" and called her a "young Londoner’s spin on modern Americana". Quinn Moreland, writing for Pitchfork, states that her greatest asset is her "gigantic and gravelly voice". Bird does not regard herself as a country artist as she finds the term "a little restrictive". Rather, she was said to consider her music to be similar to Keane and Coldplay circa 2006. Laura Snapes, writing in The Guardian, described her music as 'pop-Americana'. Ellen Johnson of Paste complimented Bird's raspy vocals in a review of her debut album and went on to say, "[she] sounds like the adopted child of Joplin and Leslie Feist, or Cat Power and Grace Potter". The magazine Clash likened her to a more radio-friendly version of compatriot Laura Marling. The News & Observer labelled her as an Americana singer while Consequence described her as "folk rock's new star".

Bird avoids the use of co-writers. She once explained that "[wanting] to write a song all by myself is a statement. I want to follow in the footsteps of the songwriters I love, and I want the songs to come from me." Her lyrics are based upon a combination of real life experiences and words and concepts that she finds aesthetically pleasing. In an interview with Spotify, Bird compared her songwriting process to that of David Bowie and explains the love that she has for the way certain words sound when sung "I love the way a word sounds and looks: ‘Cathedral’ and ‘Lottery,’ They're almost quite consonant heavy words—if you want to get geeky."

== Personal life ==
Bird has described herself as a feminist and has said "I've always wanted to be a role model in the feminist movement". She is a fan of reading, in particular the works of Patti Smith, which she has used as inspiration for titles of her songs. From 2018, she was in a relationship with Luke Prosser, who is her touring guitarist. Bird and Prosser moved to Austin, Texas in November 2020. The following November, Bird announced on her Twitter page that she was engaged to Prosser. Bird ended her engagement with Prosser and later moved to Los Angeles. In a July 2025 interview with NME, she described her relationship with Prosser as "really quite horrific". Her third album, Who Wants to Talk About Love?, details the breakdown of her relationship with her father and her parents' divorce, earlier in her childhood. As of 2025, she is in a relationship with music producer Andrew Wells.

Bird was critical of the UK government's handling of the COVID-19 pandemic for musicians, stating "I can never understand why the arts are just the first thing to go and the last thing to be thought of when it comes to politics."

== Discography ==
=== Albums ===
Title	Details	Peak chart positions						
Title	Details	UK	UK Indie	UK Americana	SCO	SWI	US Folk	US Heat.
Jade Bird	Released: 19 April 2019; Label: Glassnote; Format: Digital download, streaming, CD, vinyl	10	2	1	10	91	14	1
Different Kinds of Light	Released: 13 August 2021; Label: Glassnote; Format: Digital download, streaming, CD, vinyl	27	3	1	9	—	—	—
Who Wants to Talk About Love?	Released: 18 July 2025; Label: Glassnote; Format: Digital download, streaming, CD, vinyl	—	7	13	71	—	—	—

=== Extended plays ===
Title	Details
Something American	Released: 7 July 2017; Label: Glassnote Records; Format: Digital download, CD, vinyl
RCA Studio A Sessions	Released: 16 April 2021; Label: Glassnote Records; Format: Digital download
Burn the Hard Drive	Released: 10 April 2024; Label: Glassnote Records; Format: Digital download

=== Singles ===
List of singles, showing year released, peak chart positions and album name
Title	Year	Peak chart positions			Album
Title	Year	US AAA	US Adult	US Alt	Album
"Lottery"	2018	1	34	—	Jade Bird
"Furious"	2018	—	—	—	Non-album single
"Uh Huh"	2018	3	—	38	Jade Bird
"Love Has All Been Done Before"	2018	—	—	—	Jade Bird
"I Get No Joy"	2019	12	—	—	Jade Bird
"My Motto"	2019	—	—	—	Jade Bird
"Headstart"	2020	5	—	—	Different Kinds of Light
"Houdini"	2020	—	—	—	Different Kinds of Light
"Open up the Heavens"	2021	19	—	—	Different Kinds of Light
"Different Kinds of Light"	2021	—	—	—	Different Kinds of Light
"Now is the Time"	2021	27	—	—	Different Kinds of Light
"Burn the Hard Drive" (featuring Mura Masa)	2024	34	—	—	Burn the Hard Drive
"Who Wants"	2025	—	—	—	Who Wants to Talk About Love?
"Dreams"	2025	28	—	—	Who Wants to Talk About Love?
"Avalanche"	2025	—	—	—	Who Wants to Talk About Love?
"Nobody"	2025	—	—	—	Who Wants to Talk About Love?
"Save Your Tears"	2025	40	—	—	Who Wants to Talk About Love?
"—" denotes a recording that did not chart or was not released in that territory.

=== Guest appearances ===
List of guest appearances, showing year released, and album name
Title	Year	Album
"Don't Stop"	2018	Vanity Fair

== Awards and nominations ==
Year	Organization	Award	Work	Result
2017	ANCHOR	—N/a	Herself	Won
2017	BBC	Sound of 2018	Herself	Included
2017	Ticketweb	Ones To Watch 2018	Herself	Included
2018	Radio X	Best Songs Of 2018	"Love Has All Been Done Before"	Included
2018	Radio X	Great X-Pectations 2019	Herself	Included
2019	MTV Push	Ones To Watch 2019	Herself	Nominated
2019	Radio X	Best of British 2019	"Uh-Huh"	#84
2019	Americana Music Honors & Awards	Emerging Act of the Year	Herself	Nominated
2019	AIM Independent Music Awards	Best Independent Album	Jade Bird	Nominated
2019	AIM Independent Music Awards	UK Independent Breakthrough	Herself	Nominated
2019	AIM Independent Music Awards	International Breakthrough	Herself	Won
2020	NME Awards	Best New Act in the World	Herself	Nominated
2020	NME Awards	Best New British Act	Herself	Nominated
