= El Dorado (Marcus King album) =

Studio album by Marcus King
- Released: January 17, 2020
- Studio: Easy Eye Sound (Nashville, Tennessee)
- Genre: Blues rock
- Length: 42:14
- Label: Easy Eye Sound; Fantasy
- Producer: Dan Auerbach

Marcus King chronology
Carolina Confessions (2018)	El Dorado (2020)	Young Blood (2022)

El Dorado is the debut solo studio album by American musician Marcus King. It was released on January 17, 2020, through Easy Eye Sound and Fantasy Records. Recording sessions took place at Easy Eye Sound Studios in Nashville. Production was handled by Dan Auerbach. The album received a nomination for a Grammy Award for Best Americana Album at the 63rd Annual Grammy Awards.

The songs "The Well" and "One Day She's Here" made it to the Billboard Adult Alternative Airplay chart, peaking at numbers 12 and 19, respectively.

== Critical reception ==
Professional ratings
Aggregate scores
Source	Rating
Metacritic	77/100
Review scores
Source	Rating
AllMusic	3.5/5 stars
American Songwriter	4/5 stars
Exclaim!	7/10
PopMatters	7/10
Rolling Stone	3.5/5 stars
Spill	5/5 stars
Under the Radar	7/10 stars

El Dorado was met with universal acclaim from music critics. At Metacritic, which assigns a normalized rating out of 100 to reviews from mainstream publications, the album received an average score of 77 based on nine reviews.

Hal Horowitz of American Songwriter praised the album, calling it "an inspiring and impressive work displaying another side of King's talents, albeit one that he has shown glimpses of in the past. It's certainly his most expressive and arguably finest recorded moment". AllMusic's Mark Deming stated: "El Dorado might not boast enough shredding for King's usual audience, but if their interest in roots music goes beyond barroom blues into vintage soul, they should find plenty to enjoy here, and he's a more capable vocalist than some would expect, making this worth a spin for listeners who enjoy modern-day soul". Brandon Choghri of Exclaim! wrote: "despite the glaring transition on El Dorado, there's no identity crisis to be found — King is just as commanding as a crooner as he is with his guitar wailing through a cranked-up amplifier. It's unclear where King will go next, or how much of Auerbach's influence directed the sound of El Dorado, but King certainly has the versatility to make any shift worth listening to". Steve Horowitz of PopMatters declared: "there is a sense of motion to the record as a whole, which would make it a good driving companion. King may be looking in the rear-view mirror as he motorizes, but this record reveals the young man is moving forward in new ways". Rolling Stone gave the album three-and-a-half out of five stars briefly describing it as "an able soul shouter. … At times suggesting an Allmans session at Hi Records". Haydon Spenceley of Under the Radar noted "his songwriting and vocal performances give a picture of the coming of an important voice in the genre. Certainly one to watch".

== Track listing ==
No.	Title	Writer(s)	Length
1.	"Young Man's Dream"	Marcus King; Dan Auerbach; Pat McLaughlin	3:08
2.	"The Well"	King; Auerbach; Ronnie Bowman	2:57
3.	"Wildflowers & Wine"	King; Auerbach; Bowman	4:48
4.	"One Day She's Here"	King; Auerbach; McLaughlin	3:47
5.	"Sweet Mariona"	King; Auerbach; Bowman	2:35
6.	"Beautiful Stranger"	King; Auerbach; Paul Overstreet	4:07
7.	"Break"	King; Auerbach; McLaughlin	3:01
8.	"Say You Will"	King; Auerbach; Bowman	3:54
9.	"Turn It Up"	King; Auerbach; Overstreet	3:38
10.	"Too Much Whiskey"	King; Auerbach; Overstreet	3:54
11.	"Love Song"	King; Auerbach; Bobby Wood	2:32
12.	"No Pain"	King; Auerbach; McLaughlin	3:54
Total length:			42:14

== Personnel ==
- Marcus King – lead vocals, acoustic guitar, electric guitar
- Dan Auerbach – backing vocals, acoustic guitar, electric guitar, string guitar, bass, producer, mixing
- Ashey Wilcoxson – backing vocals
- Leisa Hans – backing vocals
- Ronnie Bowman – backing vocals
- Billy Sanford – acoustic guitar, electric guitar, gut string guitar
- Russ Pahl – acoustic guitar, electric guitar
- Paul Franklin – steel guitar
- Bobby Wood – Wurlitzer electric piano
- Raynier Jacildo – Acetone keyboards, B3 organ, vibraphone, glockenspiel, harpsichord
- Mike Rojas – piano, B3 organ, vibraphone, glockenspiel, clavinet
- Dave Roe – bass
- Gene Chrisman – drums
- Sam Bacco – percussion, vibraphone
- Chris St. Hilaire – percussion
- Matt Combs – strings
- M. Allen Parker – recording, mixing, engineering
- Alex Skelton – engineering assistant
- Caleb VanBuskirk – engineering assistant
- Richard Dodd – mastering
- Alysse Gafkjen – photography
- Perry Shall – design, layout

== Charts ==
Chart (2020)	Peak position
Belgian Albums (Ultratop Flanders)	93
Belgian Albums (Ultratop Wallonia)	118
Dutch Albums (Album Top 100)	67
French Albums (SNEP)	173
German Albums (Offizielle Top 100)	64
Scottish Albums (OCC)	50
Spanish Albums (Promusicae)	54
Swiss Albums (Schweizer Hitparade)	12
UK Americana Albums (OCC)	1
US Billboard 200	142
US Top Album Sales (Billboard)	12
US Top Rock Albums (Billboard)	17
US Americana/Folk Albums (Billboard)	2
US Top Current Album Sales (Billboard)	12
US Top Blues Albums (Billboard)	1
US Vinyl Albums (Billboard)	14
