= Burn the Hard Drive =

EP by Jade Bird
- Released: April 10, 2024
- Genre: Indie folk, americana
- Length: 13:52
- Label: Glassnote Records
- Producer: Mura Masa

Jade Bird chronology
Different Kinds of Light (2021)	Burn the Hard Drive (2024)	Who Wants to Talk About Love? (2025)

Burn the Hard Drive is the second EP by British musician Jade Bird. The EP was released on April 15, 2024. The EP features songs written prior to her breakup from her fiancée and former guitarist Luke Prosser, they are themed around a breakup that had yet to happen. The EP was produced by Mura Masa, who is featured on the title track.

== Track listing ==
All tracks are written by Jade Bird, Alexander Crossan and Luke Prosser, except where noted.

Burn the Hard Drive track listing
No.	Title	Writer(s)	Length
1.	"C.O.M.P.L.E.X"		2:14
2.	"You've Fallen in Love Again"		2:58
3.	"Burn the Hard Drive" (feat. Mura Masa)		3:12
4.	"C'est La Vie"	Jade Bird	2:26
5.	"Breaking the Grey"		3:02
Total length:			13:52
