= Heartbreaker Please =

Studio album by Teddy Thompson
- Released: 29 May 2020
- Genre: Americana
- Label: Thirty Tigers

Teddy Thompson chronology
Little Windows (2016)	Heartbreaker Please (2020)

Heartbreaker Please is the sixth studio album by English musician Teddy Thompson. It was released on 29 May 2020 under Thirty Tigers.

== Critical reception ==
Professional ratings
Aggregate scores
Source	Rating
Metacritic	67/100
Review scores
Source	Rating
AllMusic	3.5/5 stars
American Songwriter	4/5 stars
MusicOMH	3.5/5 stars

Heartbreaker Please was met with generally favourable reviews from critics. At Metacritic, which assigns a weighted average rating out of 100 to reviews from mainstream publications, this release received an average score of 67, based on 7 reviews.

== Track listing ==
Heartbreaker Please track listing
No.	Title	Length
1.	"Why Wait"	2:58
2.	"At a Light"	3:20
3.	"Heartbreaker Please"	3:01
4.	"Brand New"	3:14
5.	"What Now"	3:44
6.	"No Idea"	5:17
7.	"Record Player"	2:24
8.	"Take Me Away"	3:19
9.	"It's Not Easy"	2:35
10.	"Move at Speed"	2:53
