= Little Windows =

Studio album by Teddy Thompson and Kelly Jones
- Released: 1 April 2016
- Genre: Country; Folk-pop
- Label: Cooking Vinyl
- Producer: Mike Viola

Teddy Thompson chronology
Family (2014)	Little Windows (2016)	Heartbreaker Please (2020)

Little Windows is a collaborative studio album by Teddy Thompson and Los Angeles based singer Kelly Jones, released on 1 April 2016. The album reached number 1 on the UK country album chart following its release.

== Track listing ==
No.	Title	Writer(s)	Length
1.	"I Never Knew You Loved Me Too"	Kelly Jones, Teddy Thompson, Bill DeMain	2:32
2.	"Make a Wish on Me"	Jones, Thompson, DeMain	2:16
3.	"Better at Lying"	Jones, Thompson, DeMain	2:54
4.	"Wondering"	Jones, DeMain	2:38
5.	"I Thought That We Said Goodbye"	Jones, Thompson, DeMain	2:39
6.	"Don't Remind Me"	Jones, Thompson, DeMain	3:07
7.	"As You Were"	Jones, Thompson, DeMain	2:37
8.	"Only Fooling"	Jones, Thompson, DeMain	2:45
9.	"You Can't Call Me Baby"	DeMain, Georgia Middleman	1:57
10.	"You Took My Future"	Jones, Thompson, DeMain	2:20

== Charts ==
Chart (2016)	Peak position
UK Country Albums (OCC)	1
