= Three Chords & the Truth (Van Morrison album) =

Studio album by Van Morrison
- Released: 25 October 2019
- Genre: Americana, blues rock
- Length: 67:30
- Label: Exile Productions; Caroline
- Producer: Van Morrison

Van Morrison chronology
The Prophet Speaks (2018)	Three Chords & the Truth (2019)	Latest Record Project, Volume 1 (2021)

Three Chords & the Truth is the 41st studio album by Northern Irish singer-songwriter Van Morrison, released on 25 October 2019 by Exile Productions and Caroline Records. His sixth record in four years, it reached the Top 20 in seven countries. Morrison's first album to feature all-new original songs since 2012’s Born to Sing: No Plan B, it includes "If We Wait for Mountains", a co-write with Don Black, and "Fame Will Eat the Soul", a duet with Bill Medley of the Righteous Brothers.

== Critical reception ==
Professional ratings
Aggregate scores
Source	Rating
Metacritic	80/100
Review scores
Source	Rating
AllMusic	4/5 stars
American Songwriter	4/5 stars
The Philadelphia Inquirer	3/5 stars
Pitchfork	7.3/10

According to the review aggregator Metacritic, Three Chords & the Truth received "generally favorable reviews" based on a weighted average score of 80 out of 100 from 7 critic scores. It was chosen as a 'Favorite Blues Album' by AllMusic. Pitchfork concluded that it demonstrates that "Van Morrison remains one of rock’s most enduring studies in contrast, never changing and forever restless." "Songwriter Harlan Howard coined the phrase “Three chords and the truth” to describe the necessary ingredients for country and western music", it notes, but finds that "this isn’t a country record. Van’s talking about his desire to take simple rhymes and traditional song structures and imbue them with Caledonia soul heaviness." American Songwriter writes that "the vibrant, often vivacious Three Chords and the Truth" finds the 74-year-old "dashing along in an extraordinary creative and fertile clip".

== Track listing ==
All tracks are written by Van Morrison, except "If We Wait for Mountains", co-written with Don Black.

No.	Title	Length
1.	"March Winds in February"	4:37
2.	"Fame Will Eat the Soul"	4:51
3.	"Dark Night of the Soul"	5:56
4.	"In Search of Grace"	3:41
5.	"Nobody in Charge"	4:12
6.	"You Don't Understand"	6:17
7.	"Read Between the Lines"	3:41
8.	"Does Love Conquer All?"	4:42
9.	"Early Days"	3:40
10.	"If We Wait for Mountains"	2:42
11.	"Up on Broadway"	6:23
12.	"Three Chords and the Truth"	5:00
13.	"Bags Under My Eyes"	4:05
14.	"Days Gone By"	7:43
Total length:		67:30

== Personnel ==
- Van Morrison - acoustic rhythm guitar, electric guitar, electric piano, saxophone, vocals
- Dave Keary - electric guitar, bazouki
- Jay Berliner - acoustic guitar
- David Hayes, Pete Hurley, Jeremy Brown - bass
- John Allair, Richard Dunn - Hammond organ
- Paul Moran - organ
- Teena Lyle - piano, percussion, vibes
- Stuart McIlroy - piano
- Bobby Ruggiero, Colin Griffin - drums
- Bill Medley - vocals on "Fame Will Eat the Soul"

== Charts ==
Chart (2019)	Peak position
Australian Albums (ARIA)	11
Austrian Albums (Ö3 Austria)	8
Belgian Albums (Ultratop Flanders)	14
Belgian Albums (Ultratop Wallonia)	57
Croatian International Albums (HDU)	1
Czech Albums (ČNS IFPI)	74
Dutch Albums (Album Top 100)	18
French Albums (SNEP)	170
German Albums (Offizielle Top 100)	11
Irish Albums (IRMA)	15
Italian Albums (FIMI)	38
Japanese Albums (Oricon)	127
New Zealand Albums (RMNZ)	20
Portuguese Albums (AFP)	23
Spanish Albums (PROMUSICAE)	7
Swedish Albums (Sverigetopplistan)	34
Swiss Albums (Schweizer Hitparade)	15
UK Albums (OCC)	13
US Billboard 200	57
US Top Rock Albums (Billboard)	6
