= Marcus King =

American musician (born 1996)

- Born: March 11, 1996 (age 30); Greenville, South Carolina, U.S.
- Genres: Blues rock; Southern rock; soul
- Years active: 2013–present
- Labels: Fantasy; American Recordings/Republic/Universal
- Spouse: Briley Hussey (m. 2023)
- Website: www.marcuskingofficial.com

Marcus King (born March 11, 1996) is an American musician, singer, songwriter, and guitarist. He is lead singer, guitarist, and founder of The Marcus King Band.

His 2020 album El Dorado recorded under his own name received a nomination for Best Americana Album at the 63rd Annual Grammy Awards.

== Early life ==
Marcus King was born in Greenville, South Carolina, United States. His father, Marvin King, was a well-known blues guitarist in South Carolina who also played with gospel acts, and his grandfather was also a regionally popular musician. Marcus began playing guitar at a very early age, and at age eight he started playing shows with his father. At age eleven, he played guitar on one of his father's albums. King started playing music with his own band in his teens, juggling club gigs at night and school in the morning as he and his bandmates brainstormed with what they called "soul-influenced psychedelic Southern rock."

Deciding to pursue a career in music, King dropped out of high school in his junior year and got his GED. King took an academic approach to music, studying his favorite guitar players, particularly The Allman Brothers Band co-founder Duane Allman, B.B. King, Albert King, Waylon Jennings and Merle Haggard. King studied jazz theory and jazz performance with Steve Watson at the Fine Arts Center in Greenville, South Carolina. He received some notable early attention in 2014 after a video of him jamming at Norman's Guitars racked up millions of views on YouTube.

== Career ==
In 2019, King announced his debut solo album, El Dorado, produced by Dan Auerbach of The Black Keys at his Easy Eye Studio in Nashville. The album is a genre-bending release that was released on January 17, 2020, by Fantasy Records. On release, Associated Press declared “El Dorado already stands out as a definite high point of 2020.”

On 26 August 2022, King released his second album Young Blood, again produced by Dan Auerbach. Melinda Newman of Billboard called it "a staggeringly confident work." It debuted at number one in the Billboard Top Blues Albums Chart and was ranked as the 12th best guitar album of 2022 by Guitar World readers.

== Personal life ==
King met Briley Hussey in 2021 after she posted on social media about attending his show in Charlotte, North Carolina, and soon developed a romantic relationship with her. The couple married on February 19, 2023, in a ceremony officiated by country musician Jamey Johnson at the Schermerhorn Symphony Center in Nashville, Tennessee. Hussey has performed backup vocals during King's tours, and in September 2025 she appeared in a viral video singing an impromptu cover of "The Night the Lights Went Out in Georgia" backstage.

== Discography ==
=== Albums ===
- Soul Insight (2014)
- The Marcus King Band (2016)
- Carolina Confessions (2018)
- El Dorado (2020) No. 142 US Billboard 200
- Young Blood (2022)
- Mood Swings (2024)
- Darling Blue (2025)

=== Singles ===
Title	Year	Peak chart positions	Album
Title	Year	US AAA	Album
"The Well"	2019	12	El Dorado
"One Day She's Here"	2019	33	El Dorado
"Hard Working Man"	2022	—	Young Blood
"Blood on the Tracks"	2022	30	Young Blood
"Mood Swings"	2024	—	Mood Swings
"Honky Tonk Hell"	2025	—	Darling Blue

=== Other charted songs ===
Title	Year	Peak chart positions		Album
Title	Year	US Rock	NZ Hot	Album
"Sucker"	2024	32	14	Arcane League of Legends: Season 2
