= Different Kinds of Light =

Studio album by Jade Bird
- Released: 13 August 2021
- Recorded: 2020
- Studio: RCA Studio A (Nashville, Tennessee)
- Length: 40:23
- Label: Glassnote
- Producer: Dave Cobb

Jade Bird chronology
Jade Bird (2019)	Different Kinds of Light (2021)	Burn the Hard Drive (2024)

Professional ratings
Aggregate scores
Source	Rating
Metacritic	71/100
Review scores
Source	Rating
AllMusic	4/5 stars
Clash	8/10
DIY	4/5 stars
Mojo	3/5 stars
NME	4/5 stars
PopMatters	7/10
Uncut	5/10

Different Kinds of Light is the second full-length album from British singer-songwriter Jade Bird. The album was released on 13 August 2021.

== Track listing ==
Different Kinds of Light track listing
No.	Title	Writer(s)	Length
1.	"DKOL"	Jade Bird; Lucky Kilmartin	1:33
2.	"Open Up the Heavens"	Bird	2:41
3.	"Honeymoon"	Bird	2:50
4.	"Punchline"	Bird; Kilmartin	3:14
5.	"Different Kinds of Light"	Bird; Kilmartin	3:05
6.	"Trick Mirror"	Bird	2:33
7.	"I'm Getting Lost"	Bird	3:01
8.	"Houdini"	Bird; Kilmartin	3:16
9.	"1994"	Bird	2:14
10.	"Now Is the Time"	Bird	3:35
11.	"Candidate"	Bird; Kilmartin	2:29
12.	"Red White and Blue"	Bird; Kilmartin	2:41
13.	"Rely On"	Bird; Kilmartin	3:47
14.	"Prototype"	Bird; Kilmartin	3:16
Total length:			40:23

Different Kinds of Light digital edition bonus track
No.	Title	Writer(s)	Length
15.	"Headstart"	Bird	2:22
Total length:			42:45

== Personnel ==
Credits adapted from the album's liner notes.

=== Musicians ===
- Jade Bird – vocals (all tracks), acoustic guitar (tracks 2–14), electric guitar (2–4, 11), keyboards (3, 4, 7, 13, 14), percussion (3, 14)
- Lucky Kilmartin – modular synthesizer (1), electric guitar (2–7, 9–11, 13, 14), vocals (2–4, 13), percussion (3, 14), acoustic guitar (4), keyboards (11), Moog bass (12)
- Dave Cobb – bass, 12-string acoustic guitar, drums (2); percussion (3, 4, 9, 10, 13, 14), acoustic guitar (6, 7, 10, 14)
- Chris Powell – drums (3–11, 13, 14), percussion (6–8, 10, 11, 13)
- Brian Allen – bass (3, 4, 6, 9, 10, 14)
- Adam Gardner – bass (5, 8, 11)
- Phil Towns – keyboards (5, 8)

=== Technical ===
- Dave Cobb – production, mixing (2–15); additional production (1)
- Lucky Kilmartin – production, mixing, recording (1)
- Darrell Thorp – recording (3–14)
- Greg Koller – recording (2)
- Phillip Smith – tracking, assistance
- Pete Lyman – mastering

=== Visuals ===
- Liz Hirsch – art direction, design
- Colin Lane – photography

== Charts ==
Chart performance for Different Kinds of Light
Chart (2021)	Peak position
Scottish Albums (OCC)	9
UK Albums (OCC)	27
UK Independent Albums (OCC)	3
