= Jade Bird (album) =

Studio album by Jade Bird
- Released: 19 April 2019
- Length: 35:05
- Label: Glassnote
- Producer: Jade Bird (exec.); Simone Felice; David Baron; Alex Suarez

Jade Bird chronology
Something American EP (2017)	Jade Bird (2019)	Different Kinds of Light (2021)

Singles from Jade Bird
- 1. "Lottery" Released: 18 January 2018; 2. "Uh Huh" Released: 31 July 2018; 3. "Love Has All Been Done Before" Released: 1 November 2018; 4. "I Get No Joy" Released: 15 January 2019; 5. "My Motto" Released: 12 March 2019

Jade Bird is the debut studio album of British singer-songwriter Jade Bird. It was released on 19 April 2019 through Glassnote Records. The album includes her debut single "Lottery", which came after her debut extended play Something American, released from the preceding year, and also her breakout single "Uh Huh". The album was supported by a European and North American tour, which includes opening for The Lumineers and Hozier.

== Critical reception ==
Professional ratings
Aggregate scores
Source	Rating
Metacritic	75/100
Review scores
Source	Rating
AllMusic	3.5/5 stars
DIY	3.5/5 stars
Dork	4/5 stars
The Guardian	3/5 stars
NME	4/5 stars
Pitchfork	7.4/10

The album received a Metacritic score of 75 based on 13 reviews, indicating generally favourable reviews.

== Track listing ==
All tracks written by Jade Bird; all tracks produced by Simone Felice and David Baron, except for "Uh Huh", which was produced alongside Alex "Lefti" Suarez.

No.	Title	Length
1.	"Ruins"	2:44
2.	"Lottery"	2:33
3.	"I Get No Joy"	2:42
4.	"Side Effects"	3:11
5.	"My Motto"	2:58
6.	"Does Anybody Know"	3:27
7.	"Uh Huh"	2:22
8.	"Good at It"	2:41
9.	"17"	2:44
10.	"Love Has All Been Done Before"	3:16
11.	"Going Gone"	2:35
12.	"If I Die"	3:52
Total length:		35:05

== Charts ==
Chart (2019)	Peak position
Scottish Albums (OCC)	10
Swiss Albums (Schweizer Hitparade)	91
UK Albums (OCC)	10
UK Independent Albums (OCC)	2
