= Ruins (First Aid Kit album) =

Studio album by First Aid Kit
- Released: 19 January 2018
- Recorded: 2017
- Studio: Flora Recording & Playback (Portland, Oregon)
- Genre: Folk; indie folk
- Length: 39:34
- Label: Columbia
- Producer: Tucker Martine

First Aid Kit chronology
Stay Gold (2014)	Ruins (2018)	Who by Fire (2021)

Singles from Ruins
- 1. "It's a Shame" Released: 28 September 2017; 2. "Postcard" Released: 27 October 2017; 3. "Fireworks" Released: 1 December 2017

Ruins is the fourth studio album by Swedish folk duo First Aid Kit. The album was produced by Tucker Martine and features contributions from R.E.M.'s Peter Buck, Wilco's Glenn Kotche and Midlake's McKenzie Smith. The album was released on 19 January 2018. The lead single "It's a Shame" was released on 28 September 2017.

== Background ==
After First Aid Kit broke through internationally with their cover of the song "Tiger Mountain Peasant Song" by Fleet Foxes in 2008 the duo released three albums in six years. In an interview Klara Söderberg said: "We started touring in 2009, and between playing and recording, we never had a break. By 2015, I was kind of spent. I had a hard time expressing, let alone understanding how exhausted I was until I couldn’t do it anymore." Her sister Johanna has had a similar experience and said in the same interview: "It just came to us in different ways, having breakdowns, crying on stage, feeling it was too much ... We decided together we needed a break, and it was really hard for me to do that. I got restless and struggled with the down time, but we both needed that space. We didn’t speak for months. We had to have a divorce before we could write music again."

In August 2015 after the tour of Stay Gold ended they took a break until April 2016. In this period Klara's relationship ended which influenced the record and brought forth the title of the album: "It’s the ruins of a relationship. How sad it is, but also how beautiful it was. That’s all you have left at the end." In 2016 Klara and Johanna reconvened in Los Angeles to write the new album. The first single "It's a Shame" reflects on the shining sun in LA 'forcing' them to feel happy while in a sad mood. They wrote the album track "Rebel Heart" in a remote house in Joshua Tree. The song "My Wild Sweet Love" was initially written for the 2014 film The Fault in Our Stars but was rejected. The album closer "Nothing Has to Be True" was written on a Gibson guitar from 1928 bought as a gift by Jack White.

== Recording ==
In January 2017 the band started recording in Portland, Oregon with producer Tucker Martine. The album features contributions of R.E.M.'s Peter Buck, Wilco's Glenn Kotche and Midlake's McKenzie Smith. Singer-songwriter Laura Veirs can be heard on the song "Hem of Her Dress" along with Klara and Johanna's mother and brother.

== Promotion and release ==
In support of the album the band announced a North-American tour for the spring of 2018 with ensuing dates for the UK, Europe and Australia.

The lead single "It's a Shame" was released on 28 September 2017. The music video, directed by Mats Udd, was posted on YouTube on 10 October 2017.

The second single "Postcard" was released on 27 October 2017 with an accompanying lyrics video posted the same day on YouTube.

The third single "Fireworks" was released on 1 December 2017. The music video was also directed by Mats Udd. The clip was posted on YouTube on 5 January 2018.

The title track "Ruins" was made available for download on 12 January 2018.

On 12 January 2018, the duo appeared on The Graham Norton Show, performing the song "It's a Shame". On 23 January 2018, they also performed the song on The Ellen DeGeneres Show.

== Critical reception ==
Professional ratings
Aggregate scores
Source	Rating
AnyDecentMusic?	7.0/10
Metacritic	76/100
Review scores
Source	Rating
AllMusic	4/5 stars
The A.V. Club	B
The Daily Telegraph	4/5 stars
The Guardian	4/5 stars
The Independent	3/5 stars
NME	4/5 stars
Pitchfork	6.4/10
Q	4/5 stars
Rolling Stone	3.5/5 stars
The Times	4/5 stars

The album received acclaim from many critics. Based on 27 reviews, Ruins received a Metacritic score of 76 out of 100, indicating generally favorable reviews. Marcy Donelson of AllMusic considered Ruins "never complacent, though, keeping its rough, rustic edges." In his review Daniel Sylvester of Exclaim! concluded: "Lyrically and sonically, Ruins helps First Aid Kit gives listeners a mature, realized and often heartbreaking version of this young band's oeuvre." Andy Gill of The Independent stated: "If 2014’s Stay Gold expressed a deep desire for change, then Ruins rakes through the rubble left by those changes." He praised the "instinctive harmonies, which remain as sweet as ever." Drowned in Sound's Joe Goggins gave the album a mixed review stating: "The question hanging over it, though, is how long First Aid Kit can get away with making revisions to the original model before the law of diminishing returns begins to kick in hard." In July BBC Radio 6 Music listed Ruins as one of their best 18 albums of the year so far. A gold record was awarded in Sweden in August.

The album earned First Aid Kit their second nomination for the Brit Award for International Group.

== Track listing ==
All tracks are written by Klara and Johanna Söderberg.

Ruins track listing
No.	Title	Length
1.	"Rebel Heart"	5:22
2.	"It's a Shame"	4:00
3.	"Fireworks"	4:15
4.	"Postcard"	3:47
5.	"To Live a Life"	3:13
6.	"My Wild Sweet Love"	3:55
7.	"Distant Star"	3:10
8.	"Ruins"	3:31
9.	"Hem of Her Dress"	3:23
10.	"Nothing Has to Be True"	4:58
Total length:		39:34

== Personnel ==
First Aid Kit

- Klara Söderberg – vocals, guitar
- Johanna Söderberg – vocals

Additional musicians

- Benkt Söderberg – bass (all tracks), electric guitar (3), choir (9)
- Glenn Kotche – drums (1–5, 8), percussion (1, 3)
- Eli Moore – electric guitar (1–6, 8–10), acoustic guitar (3, 9); dulcimer, vocals (9)
- Peter Buck – electric guitar (1–4, 8), acoustic guitar (7, 9), mandolin (9)
- Justin Chase – keyboards (1), choir (9)
- Steve Moore – keyboards (1, 8), organ (2, 4, 5, 7, 9, 10), piano (2, 4–6, 8–10), synthesizer (5–7), melodica (7); choir, trombone (9)
- Melvin Duffy – steel guitar (1, 2, 4–6, 8, 10)
- Tucker Martine – tambourine (1), percussion (2, 6, 9); choir, drums (9)
- Paul Brainard – trumpet (1, 9)
- Eyvind Kang – viola (1, 3, 7, 8)
- Kyleen King – viola (5, 6, 9, 10)
- Patti King – violin (5, 6, 9, 10)
- Anna Fritz – cello (6, 9, 10)
- McKenzie Smith – drums (6, 7, 10), percussion (7, 9), choir (9)
- Anna Söderberg – choir (9)
- Isak Söderberg – choir (9)
- Laura Veirs – choir (9)
- Michael Finn – choir (9)
- Mikael Tot – choir (9)

Technical

- Tucker Martine – production, engineering
- Eric Boulanger – mastering
- Andrew Scheps – mixing
- Michael Finn – engineering
- Jett Galindo – engineering assistance
- Justin Chase – engineering assistance

Artwork

- EE Storey – design, layout
- Jason Quigley – photography
- Lauren Dukoff – photography

== Charts ==
=== Weekly charts ===
Weekly chart performance for Ruins
Chart (2018)	Peak position
Australian Albums (ARIA)	13
Austrian Albums (Ö3 Austria)	37
Belgian Albums (Ultratop Flanders)	7
Belgian Albums (Ultratop Wallonia)	76
Danish Albums (Hitlisten)	28
Dutch Albums (Album Top 100)	10
Finnish Albums (Suomen virallinen lista)	10
French Albums (SNEP)	60
German Albums (Offizielle Top 100)	42
Irish Albums (IRMA)	10
Norwegian Albums (VG-lista)	4
Scottish Albums (OCC)	1
Swedish Albums (Sverigetopplistan)	1
Swiss Albums (Schweizer Hitparade)	11
UK Albums (OCC)	3
US Billboard 200	47
US Americana/Folk Albums (Billboard)	2
US Top Rock Albums (Billboard)	6

=== Year-end charts ===
Year-end chart performance for Ruins
Chart (2018)	Position
Belgian Albums (Ultratop Flanders)	92
Swedish Albums (Sverigetopplistan)	16

== Certifications ==
Certifications for Ruins
Region	Certification	Certified units/sales
Sweden (GLF)	Gold	15,000^{‡}
United Kingdom (BPI)	Silver	60,000^{‡}
^{‡} Sales+streaming figures based on certification alone.
