= 2014 in Swedish music =

The following is a list of notable events and releases of the year 2014 in Swedish music.

== Events ==
=== February ===
- 1 – The Melodifestivalen first semi-final took place. The three next semi-finals was executed on February 8, 15, and 22.

=== March ===
- 1 – The Melodifestivalen second chance took place on March 1.
- 8 – Final of the Melodifestivalen was on March 8, 2014. Sanna Nielsen's song "Undo (Sanna Nielsen song)" won the competition.

=== April ===
- 28 – Swedes Max Martin, Ilya Salmanzadeh and Shellback produced "Problem" by Ariana Grande and Iggy Azalea.

=== May ===
- 9 – Gamlestaden Jazzfestival started in Gothenburg (May 9 – 10).

=== June ===
- 26 – The 2nd Bråvalla Festival opened near Norrköping (June 26 - 28).

=== July ===
- 5 – Ghost (Swedish band) performed at the European Sonisphere Festival at Knebworth Park, Knebworth, England.

== Album and singles releases ==
=== February ===
- 4 – Years by Markku Ounaskari / Kari Heinilä / Lena Willemark / Anders Jormin (Eclipse Records).

=== March ===
- 3 – Truth Serum EP by Tove Lo, her album released on March 3. The album speaks about a love and personal story.
- 7 – Behind The Sun by Motorpsycho with Reine Fiske (Rune Grammofon).
- 12 – Kent released La Belle Epoque on March 12.
- 28 – Momento Magico by guitarist Ulf Wakenius (ACT Music).
- 31 – My Silver Lining single by First Aid Kit, a folk-pop song.

=== April ===
- 30 – Tigerdrottningen, the eleventh studio album by Kent, was released on April 30.

=== May ===
- 13 – Hail the Apocalypse by the band Avatar is scheduled for release.

=== June ===
- 10 – Stay Gold the third album by First Aid Kit was released in the United States.

=== Unknown date ===
#

G – Hidros6 Knockin' by Mats Gustafsson & NU Ensemble (Not Two Records).

== Deaths ==
February

- 11 – Alice Babs, Swedish singer and actress (born 1924).

July

- 24 – Christian Falk, record producer and musician (born 1962).

October

- 11 – Mats Rondin, cellist and conductor (born 1960).

== See also ==
- Sweden in the Eurovision Song Contest 2014
- List of number-one singles and albums in Sweden (see 2014 section on page)
