= Lion's Roar =

Lion's Roar or The Lion's Roar may refer to:

- Roar (vocalization)

== Media ==
- Lion's Roar (magazine) (formerly Shambhala Sun), Buddhist magazine
- The Lion's Roar (Southeastern Louisiana University), student newspaper
- The Lion's Roar (publication), periodical of Liberty High School, Brentwood, California
- The Lion's Roar, a 1928 film by Mack Sennett

== Music ==
- Lion's roar (instrument), membranophone musical instrument
- The Lion's Roar (album), 2012 album by Swedish band First Aid Kit
  - "The Lion's Roar" (song), a 2011 single and title track of album above
- "The Lion's Roar", a song by Cynic from the album Kindly Bent to Free Us

== See also ==
- Operation Lion's Roar, part of the Ninawa campaign in northern Iraq in 2008
- "Roar, Lion, Roar", fight song for the Columbia Lions
- Lion's Roar of Queen Srimala, Mahayana Buddhist text
- The Lion Roars Again, 1975 short film featuring many Metro-Goldwyn-Mayer actors, including George Burns
- World War II: When Lions Roared (also known as Then There Were Giants), 1994 TV movie, directed by Joseph Sargent
