= Music IS =

Studio album by Bill Frisell
- Released: March 16, 2018
- Recorded: August 23–27, 2017
- Studio: Flora Recording & Playback, Portland, OR
- Genre: Jazz
- Length: 58:34
- Label: OKeh; 19075815002
- Producer: Lee Townsend

Bill Frisell chronology
Small Town (2017)	Music IS (2018)	Harmony (2019)

Music IS is a solo studio album by American jazz guitarist Bill Frisell, which was released on the OKeh label on March 16, 2018.

== Reception ==
Professional ratings
Review scores
Source	Rating
The Absolute Sound	4.5/5 stars
AllMusic	4/5 stars
All About Jazz	5/5 stars
Financial Times	4/5 stars
Jazz Forum	4/5 stars
Tom Hull	B+
The Times	4/5 stars

On PopMatters, Will Layman wrote, "Music Is is just Frisell and his guitars, usually overdubbed in subtle layers of sound, playing both old tunes of his and new compositions, sounding uniquely like himself: haunted and lyrical, pastoral and quirky at the same time ... Music Is not only revisits wonderful Frisell songs from decades ago, but it also gives us the chance to recall why Frisell always mattered—in jazz—as a guitar innovator". Matt Collar of AllMusic states, "With Music IS, Frisell offers an intimate window into his creative process, an open conversation with himself. Thankfully, that conversation also remains open to, and deeply satisfying for, the listener". On All About Jazz, John Kelman said "Hopefully artists evolve over the course of their careers, but every now and then evolution becomes revolution, and Music IS is, indeed, revolutionary. Frisell has come a long way since his first major label appearance with Eberhard Weber, on the German bassist's Fluid Rustle (ECM, 1979), with every album reflecting some kind of development and, more importantly, musical assimilation. But Music IS represents a significant leap forward for Frisell as a guitarist, composer and conceptualist".

Damian Fanelli of Guitar World wrote, "The focus of Music IS is on the telling of musical stories from Frisell's original and inimitable perspective: some of the interpretations being naked, exposed and truly solo, while others are more orchestrated through overdubbed layering and the use of his unparalleled approach to looping". Larry Blumenfeld of The Wall Street Journal said, "A new album serves as a reminder that the guitarist is a distinctive composer, crafting music that is simultaneously accessible and subversive."

== Track listing ==
All compositions by Bill Frisell

1. "Pretty Stars" – 3:58
2. "Winslow Homer" – 3:27
3. "Change in the Air" – 2:20
4. "What Do You Want?" – 2:45
5. "Thankful" – 5:10
6. "Ron Carter" – 4:44
7. "Think About it" – 1:00
8. "In Line" – 5:00
9. "Rambler" – 6:33
10. "The Pioneers" – 4:13
11. "Monica Jane" – 5:39
12. "Miss You" – 3:34
13. "Go Happy Lucky" – 2:55
14. "Kentucky Derby" – 2:05
15. "Made to Shine" – 2:21
16. "Rambler" [Alternate Version] – 2:50 Bonus Track

== Personnel ==
- Bill Frisell – electric guitar, acoustic guitar, bass, loops, ukulele, music box
