= Harmony (Bill Frisell album) =

Studio album by Bill Frisell
- Released: October 4, 2019
- Studio: Flora Recording & Playback, Portland, OR
- Genre: Folk jazz
- Length: 46:42
- Label: Blue Note
- Producer: Lee Townsend

Bill Frisell chronology
Music IS (2018)	Harmony (2019)	Valentine (2020)

Harmony is a studio album by American jazz guitarist Bill Frisell. The album was released on October 4, 2019, by Blue Note.

== Background ==
This is his debut record for Blue Note label. The album features Frisell on guitar, Petra Haden on voice, Hank Roberts on cello and voice, and Luke Bergman, on acoustic guitar, baritone guitar, bass, and voice. The record consists of 14 tracks of which eight are Frisell's originals with the rest being folk, country, jazz, and pop songbook standards. The origin of the Harmony traces back to 2016 when the "innovative grass roots" organisation FreshGrass gave Frisell a $25,000 commission to create new music. The album was recorded in Flora Recording and Playback studio in Portland, Oregon and produced by Frisell's long-time collaborator Lee Townsend. The release of the album was supported by an international tour that started in Sweden.

== Reception ==
Professional ratings
Aggregate scores
Source	Rating
Metacritic	72/100
Review scores
Source	Rating
The Absolute Sound	4.5/5 stars
All About Jazz	4/5 stars
AllMusic	3.5/5 stars
Exclaim!	7/10
Jazz Forum	4/5 stars
Jazz Journal	4/5 stars
PopMatters	6/10
Mojo	3/5 stars
The Times	3/5 stars

At Metacritic, that assigns a normalized rating out of 100 to reviews from mainstream critics, the album received an average score of 72, based on four reviews, which indicates "generally favorable reviews".

Mike Joyce of JazzTimes wrote, "Suffice to say, Harmony is bound to delight many fans who’ve followed the guitarist’s singular and increasingly curious path over the last few decades, even if it lacks the lighthearted tone associated with some of his most engaging sessions. Of course, because Frisell has never been overly concerned with genre distinctions, an innate sense of whimsy still informs his tune choices and original contributions." In his review for Relix, Jeff Tamarkin stated, "Harmony, which doubles as the name of the band and marks his debut for Blue Note, found its tone and direction when Frisell realized that Roberts and Bergman also sang, and that the three band members’ voices blended in a particularly charming, precise and radiant way..." Paul de Barros writing for The Seattle Times called the album, "a wide-ranging mix of spectral harmonic clouds, sweet-as-pie bluegrass and astonishingly intricate vocal jazz."

Ed Enright of DownBeat commented, "Throughout the album, Haden’s ethereal lead vocals and the trio’s quietly powerful harmonies bring new dimensions to Frisell’s music, magnifying the pensive beauty and perpetual patience that mark his guitar playing." Ian Lomax of Jazz Journal said that, "Bill Frisell continues to innovate and surprise." AllMusic's Mark Deming commented, "HARMONY sometimes feels so ethereal that it could blow away in a strong breeze, but there's a strength in the quiet of these sessions, and the best moments are nothing short of magic. If you're looking for music that will suit a quiet night with intelligence and style, you should certainly give HARMONY a listen." All About Jazz review by Mark Sullivan stated, "This album has arguably less of a guitar focus than any previous one. Yet it is suffused with his genre-free love of music, and his guitar-playing remains a foundation element. It's a beautiful group sound, with the name Harmony very well deserved." Derk Richardson of The Absolute Sound commented, "Bill Frisell makes his Blue Note label debut as a leader not by emphasizing his guitar but rather by celebrating the human voice."

== Track listing ==
No.	Title	Writer(s)	Length
1.	"Everywhere"	Bill Frisell	5:35
2.	"God's Wing'd Horse"	Bill Frisell, Julie Miller	4:07
3.	"Fifty Years"	Bill Frisell	4:06
4.	"Hard Times"	Stephen Foster	3:56
5.	"Deep Dead Blue"	Elvis Costello, Bill Frisell	3:07
6.	"There in a Dream"	Charlie Haden, Jesse Harris	4:40
7.	"Lonesome"	Bill Frisell	3:20
8.	"On the Street Where You Live"	Alan Jay Lerner, Frederick Loewe	2:28
9.	"How Many Miles?"	Bill Frisell	3:23
10.	"Lush Life"	Billy Strayhorn	3:54
11.	"Honest Man"	Bill Frisell	1:17
12.	"Red River Valley"	Traditional	2:00
13.	"Curiosity"	Bill Frisell	1:40
14.	"Where Have All the Flowers Gone?"	Pete Seeger	3:09
Total length:			46:42

== Personnel ==
- Bill Frisell – guitar
- Luke Bergman – bass, guitar (acoustic, baritone), voices
- Petra Haden – voices
- Hank Roberts – cello, voices
