= Valentine (Bill Frisell album) =

Studio album by Bill Frisell
- Released: August 14, 2020
- Recorded: late 2019
- Studio: Flora Recording & Playback, Portland, OR
- Genre: Jazz
- Length: 65:27
- Label: Blue Note
- Producer: Lee Townsend

Bill Frisell chronology
Harmony (2019)	Valentine (2020)

Valentine is a studio album by American jazz guitarist Bill Frisell. The album was released on August 14, 2020, by Blue Note Records. This is his second release on the label.

== Reception ==
Professional ratings
Review scores
Source	Rating
All About Jazz	4/5 stars
AllMusic	4/5 stars
Financial Times	4/5 stars
DownBeat	5/5 stars
Jazz Journal	4/5 stars
RIFF	8/10
Spectrum Culture	3.5/5 stars
The Times	4/5 stars

Thom Jurek of AllMusic stated, "Valentine is a portrait of this trio at a creative peak. While not the liveliest record in Frisell's catalog, it is one of his most inquiring, rhythmically inventive, and lyrical. Given his voluminous discography, that's saying plenty." Ian Patterson of All About Jazz noted, "With Valentine, Frisell, Royston and Morgan revel in the tight but loose interplay that is a hallmark of the best groups, plying a course as deeply lyrical as it is adventurous. Feels like the beginning of a great adventure." Jazz Journal review by Elliot Marlow-Stevens commented, "Valentine represents the more reserved, gentle approach to music that he demonstrated on albums like 1992’s Have a Little Faith. Nonetheless, it is still a highly original album, delivered with the ability and skill of a veteran jazz guitarist." Jake Cole in his review for Spectrum Culture stated, "A breezy combination of blues, folk and jazz, Frisell’s latest is the sound of a maestro gently flexing his immense skills." Chris Pearson of The Times wrote, "Bill Frisell has been exploring the fringes of jazz guitar so much lately that a trio album arrives as a bold departure. Yet the familiar elements remain: nostalgia, solitude and contemplation cloaked in an atmosphere of dead-of-night tranquillity."

== Track listing ==
No.	Title	Writer(s)	Length
1.	"Baba Drame"	Boubacar Traoré	4:59
2.	"Hour Glass"	Frisell	2:59
3.	"Valentine"	Frisell	6:28
4.	"Levees"	Frisell	6:04
5.	"Winter Always Turns to Spring"	Frisell	5:11
6.	"Keep Your Eyes Open"	Frisell	6:05
7.	"A Flower Is a Lovesome Thing"	Billy Strayhorn	7:23
8.	"Electricity"	Frisell	3:19
9.	"Wagon Wheels"	Billy Hill, Peter DeRose	4:15
10.	"Aunt Mary"	Frisell	3:19
11.	"What the World Needs Now Is Love"	Burt Bacharach, Hal David	5:56
12.	"Where Do We Go?"	Frisell	3:09
13.	"We Shall Overcome"	Traditional	6:26
Total length:			65:27

== Personnel ==
- Bill Frisell – guitars
- Thomas Morgan – bass
- Rudy Royston – drums
