= Train Dreams (soundtrack) =

Train Dreams (Soundtrack from the Netflix Film)

Film score by Bryce Dessner
- Released: November 7, 2025
- Recorded: 2024–2025
- Studios: Flora Recording & Playback, Portland, Oregon
- Genre: Film score
- Length: 55:47
- Label: Netflix Music
- Producer: Bryce Dessner

Bryce Dessner chronology
The Accountant 2 (2025)	Train Dreams (2025)

Singles from Train Dreams (Soundtrack from the Netflix Film)
- 1. "Passageways I: Ahead, Trembling" Released: October 24, 2025; 2. "The Great Mystery" Released: October 31, 2025

Train Dreams (Soundtrack from the Netflix Film) is the soundtrack album to the 2025 film Train Dreams directed by Clint Bentley, starring Joel Edgerton, Felicity Jones, Clifton Collins Jr., Kerry Condon, and William H. Macy. The film score is composed by Bryce Dessner and released through Netflix Music on November 7, 2025. Two singles—"Passageways I: Ahead, Trembling" and "The Great Mystery"—preceded ahead of the film's release. The album also features an original theme song under the eponymous title, performed by Dessner and Australian musician Nick Cave, which was nominated for the Academy Award for Best Original Song.

== Development and production ==
In January 2025, it was announced that Bryce Dessner would compose the film score for Train Dreams. He was involved in the project owing to his personal and working relationship with Bentley and screenwriter Greg Kwedar in previous films, such as Transpecos (2016), Jockey (2021) and Sing Sing (2023). As they were known for working in small budget films which are "extremely well-written and fully conceived" he felt it rare that they ask for music to solve a problem but dreaming in a bigger way to allow music to add a poetry and liked their sense of trust on his working collaboration and mutual admiration. Each film on their collaboration is different from one another; Dessner felt that Train Dreams had more room for music and felt the sweeping of forest and sense of earth was really important.

Dessner read the novel even before he shot the film and eventually liked it even more, and while receiving the script, he compared it to the novella and had been in discussion with Kwedar and Bentley regarding the musical landscape. As he liked the novel, he could imagine the music in his mind. Part of his music was recorded at the Flora Recording & Playback studio in Portland, Oregon, where his band The National had recorded. He utilized more instruments from the early-to-mid-20th century, like upright pianos, harmoniums, old acoustic guitars, ukuleles, pump organs, parlor pianos, banjos and ribbon microphones within its shiplap wood walls, which were mixed through contemporary synth sounds to provide a devastating but also whimsical and beautiful feeling.

Dessner recalled about Bentley's decision to reflect the time and place musically, but also not necessarily be a period film, which led him to explore modern elements. Thus, the score became a combination of analog sounds, coupled with synthesizers and processed elements. He further admitted that much of the instrumentation was reminiscent of the American folk music but also thought about orchestral music from that period in the way the strings and texture could blend in an organic way. He felt the cinematography had an epic quality and that natural ambience felt him to be immersed in that environment. Having wrote few themes even before composing to the picture, some of them were not included, while some pieces were altered and included in the film. Dessner wrote a suite of themes, to which he felt that the music for this film resembled his work in a concert hall.

== Composition ==
The challenging moment on composing the score was to reflect the loss of Robert Grainer at the heart of the story and wanted to feel empathy. Dessner felt that he had to reach that depth without overwhelming the film and had to find a tone between light and dark. But as the story being so deeply human, and how humans experience love and loss at some points in their lives, as a trajectory that allowing him to balance those lightheartedness and melancholy very well. He further contemplated the poetic nature of the film and that the music accessed in such a way that it felt poetic.

On composing the fire scene, he discussed with Bentley, Kwedar, the editor and sound designer Parker Laramie about creating the sound of fire. He felt the natural and ambient moments were musical and informative, and in that particular scene, the composition was reminiscent as he scored during that time the California wildfires happened. The scene was considered to be more intense and emotional, providing a sense of loss as well. Comparing the works of György Ligeti, whose music had an orchestral and layered feeling but also had a melodic undertone when Robert Grainer begins to realize what had happened, and a passacaglia—which heard in Wolfgang Amadeus Mozart's composition Requiem—is played underpinning his loss, considering it as an ambitious moment to score.

Dessner worked with Nick Cave to write the eponymous theme song that plays during the end credits. While searching for a songwriter to write the theme song, Cave was on top priority in Dessner and Bentley's lists. While Dessner met Cave remotely when the latter was touring, the latter said that he was also a fan of the novel. Dessner further sent him the music he had written for the score, while the latter wrote lyrics for the song. Dessner praised Cave's lyric writing ability, calling him "someone who can put all these feelings into words — he does it so beautifully" and contributes to the emotional and sentimental value of the film. He also praised the working relationship with Cave, calling him a respectful, humble and elegant collaborator and was open to feedback which helped in shaping the very well.

== Track listing ==
No.	Title	Length
1.	"A Faint Understanding"	1:35
2.	"Placing Stones"	2:25
3.	"Cross Cutting"	0:37
4.	"Passageways I: Ahead, Trembling"	2:22
5.	"Reunion"	1:15
6.	"Home I"	2:58
7.	"Family Photograph"	1:13
8.	"The Cut"	2:08
9.	"The Gadabout, Pt I"	0:44
10.	"The Gadabout, Pt II"	1:45
11.	"Cross Cutting – Redux"	0:48
12.	"Home II"	2:00
13.	"Dreamy and Forgetful"	1:38
14.	"Memories Foretold"	0:16
15.	"Ashes of Dreams"	2:44
16.	"The Great Fire"	2:19
17.	"Voices in the Trees"	2:24
18.	"Passageways II: The Great Comet"	2:06
19.	"The New Cut"	2:32
20.	"Passageways III: The Ancient Lake"	1:18
21.	"Follies & Endeavors"	1:11
22.	"Flood Stories"	1:09
23.	"Visions of Gladys"	3:35
24.	"Kate, Returned"	3:58
25.	"Passageways IV: Still Waiting"	4:10
26.	"The Great Mystery"	2:14
27.	"Train Dreams" (Nick Cave)	4:23
Total length:		55:47

== Reception ==
Justin Chang of The New Yorker wrote "[Dessner's] rippling chords seem to evoke the sounds of cascading water". Brian Tallerico of RogerEbert.com called it "a captivating score by the great Bryce Dessner". David Rooney of The Hollywood Reporter called it a "cascading score that ranges across many moods", while Bilge Ebiri of Vulture called it a "quavering score". John Anderson of The Wall Street Journal described it a "a delirious marriage of music by composer Bryce Dessner". Ross Bonaime of Collider called it "a spectacular score by Bryce Dessner, which heightens the power of every scene — especially in the outstanding final scenes that make the simple moments magnificent."

Catherine Wheatley of Sight and Sound said that "an atmospheric score by The National’s Bryce Dessner heightens the sense of mounting dread." Dan Mecca of The Film Stage wrote "Much of the same can be said for Bryce Dessner’s score, a majestic piece of work that does a lot of emotional lifting (complimentary)." Peter Debruge of Variety noted that Dessner's string score aided the film. Travis M. Andrews of The Washington Post wrote "the National’s Bryce Dessner’s dreamy strings swell and his hypnotic piano makes you forget time." Tim Grierson of Screen International wrote "Bryce Dessner’s lilting score, full of banjo, ukulele and strings, has the impact of a sustained sigh, lamenting the film’s solitary, closed-off protagonist as well as the beautiful natural world he adores." Kevin Maher of The Times wrote "if the drama hasn’t broken your heart by the end, the music by the National’s Bryce Dessner certainly will." Peter Keough of The Arts Fuse described it a "subdued but poignant score".

== Accolades ==
Award	Date of ceremony	Category	Recipient(s)	Result	Ref.
Academy Awards	March 15, 2026	Best Original Song	"Train Dreams" (Nick Cave and Bryce Dessner)	Nominated	
Astra Film Awards	December 11, 2025	Best Original Song	"Train Dreams" (Nick Cave and Bryce Dessner)	Nominated	
Chicago Film Critics Association	December 11, 2025	Best Original Score	Bryce Dessner	Nominated	
Critics' Choice Awards	January 4, 2026	Best Song	"Train Dreams" (Nick Cave and Bryce Dessner)	Nominated	
Georgia Film Critics Association	December 27, 2025	Best Original Score	Bryce Dessner	Runner-up	
Georgia Film Critics Association	December 27, 2025	Best Original Song	"Train Dreams" (Nick Cave and Bryce Dessner)	Nominated	
Golden Globes	January 11, 2026	Best Original Song	"Train Dreams" (Nick Cave and Bryce Dessner)	Nominated	
Houston Film Critics Society	January 20, 2026	Best Original Song	"Train Dreams" (Nick Cave and Bryce Dessner)	Nominated	
Las Vegas Film Critics Society	December 19, 2025	Best Song	"Train Dreams" (Nick Cave and Bryce Dessner)	Nominated	
San Francisco Bay Area Film Critics Circle	December 14, 2025	Best Original Score	Bryce Dessner	Nominated	
Satellite Awards	March 8, 2026	Best Original Song	"Train Dreams" (Nick Cave and Bryce Dessner)	Nominated	
Society of Composers & Lyricists	February 6, 2026	Outstanding Original Score for an Independent Film	Bryce Dessner	Won	
