= Emmylou (disambiguation) =

Emmylou or Emmy Lou is a given name or nickname.

Emmylou may also refer to:

== People ==
- Emmylou Harris (born 1947) is an American singer, songwriter, and musician.
- Emmy Lou Packard, American artist
- Emmylou Taliño-Mendoza (born 1972), a Filipino politician

== Music ==
- "Emmylou" (song), by First Aid Kit on their Lion's Roar album

== Other ==
- EmmyLou Sugarbean, a fictional cartoon character on the television series American Dad!
- Emmy Lou, a comic strip by Marty Links
- PS Emmylou, a river ship in Australia
