= Drunken Trees =

EP by First Aid Kit
- Released: 9 April 2008
- Recorded: Cellar Door
- Genre: Folk
- Length: 28:12
- Label: Rabid, Wichita
- Producer: Klara Söderberg; Johanna Söderberg; Benkt Söderberg

First Aid Kit chronology
Drunken Trees (2008)	The Big Black and the Blue (2010)

Drunken Trees is the debut release by Swedish folk duo First Aid Kit. It was released on 9 April 2008 in Sweden via Rabid Records, followed by a UK release via Wichita Records on 23 February 2009. The UK release features the band's cover of Fleet Foxes' "Tiger Mountain Peasant Song" as a bonus track, in addition to videos of "Our Own Pretty Ways", "Jagadamba, You Might" and "You're Not Coming Home Tonight".

== Track listing ==
All tracks written by Klara and Johanna Söderberg except where noted.

No.	Title	Length
1.	"Little Moon"	3:52
2.	"You're Not Coming Home Tonight"	2:29
3.	"Tangerine"	3:12
4.	"Jagadamba, You Might"	3:45
5.	"Our Own Pretty Ways"	3:27
6.	"Pervigilo"	5:33
7.	"Cross Oceans"	2:50

UK Enhanced Edition bonus tracks
No.	Title	Writer(s)	Length
8.	"Tiger Mountain Peasant Song"	Robin Pecknold	3:04
9.	"Our Own Pretty Ways" (Video)		3:59
10.	"Jagadamba, You Might" (Video)		4:12
11.	"You're Not Coming Home Tonight" (Video)		2:32

== Reception ==
Professional ratings
Review scores
Source	Rating
AllMusic	3.5/5 stars
There Goes the Fear	(positive)
The Skinny	4/5 stars
musicOMH	3/5 stars
Contactmusic	(positive)
The Line of Best Fit	(65%)
For Folk's Sake	(positive)

Drunken Trees attracted attention largely from independent music journalists, whose response was generally positive.

The Skinny gave the EP a score of 4/5, writing that "these two have world-weary voices far beyond their years, in the same way that Dylan did when he was 21...an understated acoustic gem." Allmusic, meanwhile, were more reserved, writing that while the band "sing in full, earthy, expressive tones that belie their years", they are "still in the process of refining their craft, and still taking plenty of cues from other artists".

== Credits ==
- Klara and Johanna Söderberg - production, vocals, instrumentation, design & artwork
- Benkt Söderberg - production
- Joachim Ekkerman - mixing
- Håkan Åkesson - mastering
