= The Big Black and the Blue =

Studio album by First Aid Kit
- Released: 25 January 2010
- Recorded: Cellar Door
- Genre: Folk
- Length: 42:10
- Label: Wichita
- Producer: Klara Söderberg; Johanna Söderberg; Benkt Söderberg

First Aid Kit chronology
Drunken Trees (2008)	The Big Black and the Blue (2010)	The Lion's Roar (2012)

The Big Black and the Blue is the first studio album by Swedish folk duo First Aid Kit. It was released on 25 January 2010 in the UK via Wichita Recordings, followed by a US release on 25 May 2010.

== Reception ==
Professional ratings
Aggregate scores
Source	Rating
Metacritic	70/100
Review scores
Source	Rating
AllMusic	2.5/5 stars
Clash	7/10 stars
Drowned in Sound	6/10 stars
The Guardian	3/5 stars
musicOMH	3.5/5 stars
NME	8/10 stars

The Big Black and the Blue received a largely positive reception from music journalists. The album holds an aggregate score of 70/100 on Metacritic, indicating generally positive reviews.

NME awarded the album a score of 8/10, highlighting the band's "phenomenal way with gorgeous melodies and heart-melting harmonies", while Clash wrote that "the lyrics remain to stand out behind the relaxing tempo and give edge to their songs...which makes the whole experience magical". As with Drunken Trees, however, some critics offered more reserved praise: Drowned in Sound gave the album a score of 6/10, writing that "while there are tracks of beauty and wonder, there are duller moments too, where the history that First Aid Kit derive their music from overwhelms their songs, reminding us always of what came before.". The BBC, while praising the album as a whole, also expressed reservations, noting that "songs are, at times, little more than sketches...there’s only ever one element that’s properly illuminated: the vocals."

== Singles ==
- "Ghost Town" (7" vinyl/digital, 27 September 2010)

== Track listing ==
All tracks written by Klara and Johanna Söderberg.

The Big Black and the Blue track listing
No.	Title	Length
1.	"In the Morning"	2:36
2.	"Hard Believer"	3:40
3.	"Sailor Song"	2:44
4.	"Waltz for Richard"	2:49
5.	"Heavy Storm"	3:21
6.	"Ghost Town"	4:47
7.	"Josefin"	3:31
8.	"A Window Opens"	4:21
9.	"Winter Is All Over You"	3:39
10.	"I Met Up with the King"	2:49
11.	"Wills of the River"	4:19

UK edition bonus track
No.	Title	Length
12.	"All My Trials"	3:34

UK iTunes edition bonus track
No.	Title	Length
12.	"I'm Building Myself a Boat"	3:22

Re-issue bonus tracks
No.	Title	Length
12.	"Hard Believer" (live on KCRW)	3:38
13.	"Heavy Storm" (live on KCRW)	3:05
14.	"Ghost Town" (live on KCRW)	4:30
15.	"I Met up with a King" (live on KCRW)	3:25

Itunes bonus tracks
No.	Title	Length
12.	"Josefin" (Live at the Old Queens Head, London)	3:30
13.	"Sailor Song" (Live at the Old Queens Head, London)	2:55

== Personnel ==
- Klara and Johanna Söderberg – production, vocals, instrumentation, mixing (tracks 1, 3–12), design and artwork
- Charlie Smoliansky – drums (tracks 1, 3, 5, 8, 10)
- Benkt Söderberg – mixing (tracks 1, 3–12)
- Johan Gustavsson – mixing (track 2)
- Erik Broheden – mastering (tracks 1–11)
- Henrik Jonsson – mastering (track 12)

== Charts ==
Chart performance for The Big Black and the Blue
Chart (2010)	Peak position
Swedish Albums (Sverigetopplistan)	30
