= Stay Gold (First Aid Kit album) =

Studio album by First Aid Kit
- Released: 6 June 2014
- Studios: ARC (Omaha, Nebraska)
- Genres: Folk; indie folk; Americana
- Length: 38:25
- Label: Columbia
- Producer: Mike Mogis

First Aid Kit chronology
The Lion's Roar (2012)	Stay Gold (2014)	Ruins (2018)

Singles from Stay Gold
- 1. "My Silver Lining" Released: 31 March 2014; 2. "Cedar Lane" Released: 6 May 2014

Stay Gold is the third studio album by Swedish indie folk duo First Aid Kit, released on 6 June 2014 in mainland Europe and on 13 June elsewhere. The album was produced by Mike Mogis, who worked on the band's previous album, The Lion's Roar.

According to an interview with Sveriges Television, the album revolves more about their own life than their previous ones. "That one has to learn appreciate what is and that all flows, that nothing stays". Stay Gold introduced new elements to First Aid Kit's music, such as a 16-piece orchestra, arranged and orchestrated by Nathaniel Walcott. Their previous albums had been produced in such a way that would allow the band to perform with three people on stage; however, these limitations have been lifted to give the band a bigger, more fulfilling sound.

The title of the album is a reference to the poem Nothing Gold Can Stay by Robert Frost. The title track echoes several lines from the poem.

== Critical reception ==
Professional ratings
Aggregate scores
Source	Rating
AnyDecentMusic?	7.4/10
Metacritic	80/100
Review scores
Source	Rating
AllMusic	4/5 stars
The Daily Telegraph	4/5 stars
The Guardian	4/5 stars
The Independent	4/5 stars
Los Angeles Times	2.5/4 stars
NME	8/10
Pitchfork	7.3/10
Q	4/5 stars
Rolling Stone	3.5/5 stars
Spin	8/10

The album received acclaim from many music critics, gaining an overall metacritic score of 80, indicating generally favorable reviews. Scott Kerr of AllMusic noted that the album is "noticeably more expansive than any of their previous work", and "has a rich texture of classic country instrumentation and stirring string arrangements, matching their soaring vocal melodies." The music review site musicOMH complimented on the larger sound that came from the band utilising more instruments, as well as the sister's "new-found, beefed up timbres". It also described the album as "[P]erfectly poised to knock you for six this summer". Andy Gill of The Independent judged the album "an engaging, youthful and thoughtful folk-rock", although James Hall of The Daily Telegraph thought the album "closer to country than folk", and wondered if "it's aimed at cracking the United States". Stephen M. Deusner of Pitchfork thought that the Söderbergs sisters "remain romantics in an unromantic world, not only writing lyrics about fighting the good fight but making the kind of wide-eyed, ‘70s-tinged folk-rock that thrives on soaring vocals, warm harmonies, big choruses, and heart-on-sleeve lyrics." He also considered the album "certainly their grandest and arguably their most consistent release to date". Leonie Cooper of NME thought that the duo had mastered "the art of sophisticated sadness", and "carefully crafted a tender batch of songs that disarm not only with their beauty but also their honesty."

A few critics however gave the album a mixed review. Randall Roberts of the Los Angeles Times found that "the group often sounds more derivative than it does inspired", not helped by its "clumsy lyrics".

On 10 July, Billboard listed "My Silver Lining" as one of the ten best songs of 2014 (so far) in their Mid-Year Music 2014 list.

In November 2014, American Songwriter listed Stay Gold at number ten in their 2014 top 50 album list. On 1 December, Paste Magazine listed it as 9th in their top 50 album list and the song "My Silver Lining" as 19th in their top 50 song list. The album ranked number seven on Gigwise's 50 Best Albums of 2014. Rolling Stone magazine listed "Master Pretender" as 35th in their top 50 songs of 2014 list. BBC Radio 6 Music listed 'Stay Gold' album as 3rd in their 2014 album list.

Jessica Goodman and Ryan Kistobak of The Huffington Post included the album on their list of 2014's best releases. Goldman noted that the album sounds "confident" and "more mature" while complimenting that "the duo has settled their folksy sound into a grand and far-reaching formula that delivers real talk lines".

On 25 February 2015, the album won the Swedish Grammis award for 2014 "Album of the Year". On 3 February 2016, First Aid Kit received special Best Selling Americana Album of 2015 award for their album Stay Gold from Americana Music Association UK.

On 22 November 2019 Stay Gold album was listed at number six in the Paste magazine's 40 best folk albums of the 2010s list.

== Commercial performance ==
Stay Gold debuted at number one on the Swedish Albums Chart. By the end of August, the album was still in the top three and had been certified gold; in January 2015, it was still in the top 20 and was certified a platinum by the Swedish Recording Industry Association (GLF). It also debuted at number 11 on the UK Albums Chart, selling 11,281 copies sold in its first week. On 2 January 2015, it was certified silver by the British Phonographic Industry (BPI). Following the duo's UK tour and their appearance on The Graham Norton Show on 30 January 2015, the album climbed from number 54 to number 11 with 7,726 copies sold. The following week, it spent a second consecutive week at number 11. Stay Gold was certified gold by the BPI on 3 April 2015, denoting shipments in excess of 100,000 copies.

By December 2014, the album had sold nearly 200,000 copies worldwide.

== Track listing ==
All tracks are written by Klara and Johanna Söderberg.

No.	Title	Length
1.	"My Silver Lining"	3:35
2.	"Master Pretender"	3:47
3.	"Stay Gold"	4:11
4.	"Cedar Lane"	4:43
5.	"Shattered & Hollow"	4:04
6.	"The Bell"	3:28
7.	"Waitress Song"	4:04
8.	"Fleeting One"	3:14
9.	"Heaven Knows"	3:18
10.	"A Long Time Ago"	4:01
11.	"Brother" (Japanese edition bonus track)	3:30

== Personnel ==
- Klara Söderberg - vocals (1–10), guitar (1–10), percussion (2)
- Johanna Söderberg - vocals (1–10), keyboard (1–10), autoharp (1–10), percussion (2)
- Benkt Söderberg - bass (1–9), percussion (2)
- Niclas Lindström - drums (1–9), percussion (1–9)
- Brian Sherwood - viola (1, 3, 4, 7, 10)
- Jeffery King - violin (1)
- Mike Mogis - bass (1, 2), percussion (1–3, 5–9), pedal steel (2, 4, 7), Marxophone (2), electric guitar (2, 4, 9), lap dulcimer (2), mandolin (2, 9), programming (3, 5), autoharp (3), acoustic guitar (6)
- Nathaniel Walcott - string and woodwind arrangements, piano (1, 3, 4, 6, 8, 10), organ (2, 5, 6, 7, 9), electric piano (5), trumpet (7)
- Paul Ledwon - cello (1, 3, 4, 7, 10)
- Susanna Gilmore - violin (1)
- Ben Brodin - Mellotron (2), vibraphone (8)
- John Klinghammer - clarinet (2–4, 6, 8), bass clarinet (2–4, 6, 8)
- Leslie Fagan - flute (2–4, 6, 8), alto flute (2–4, 6, 8)
- Anna Söderberg - percussion (2)
- Isak Söderberg - percussion (2)
- Dan Fletcher - violin (3, 4, 7, 10)
- Frank Seligman - violin (3, 4, 7, 10)
- Judy Divis - viola (3, 4, 7, 10)
- Juliet Yoshida - violin (3, 4, 7, 10)
- Keith Plenert - violin (3, 4, 7, 10)
- Phyllis Duncan - violin (3, 4, 7, 10)
- Scott Shoemaker - violin (3, 4, 7, 10)
- Thomas Kluge - viola (3, 4, 7, 10)
- Tim Strang - cello (3, 4, 7, 10)
- Tracy Dunn - violin (3, 4, 7, 10)
- Will Clifton - upright bass (3, 10)
- Produced, mixed and engineered by Mike Mogis at ARC Studios, Omaha, NE
- Assistant engineer: Ben Brodin
- Mastered by Doug Van Sloun at Focus Mastering

== Charts ==
=== Weekly charts ===
Weekly chart performance for Stay Gold
Chart (2014–2016)	Peak position
Australian Albums (ARIA)	9
Belgian Albums (Ultratop Flanders)	54
Belgian Albums (Ultratop Wallonia)	90
Canadian Albums (Billboard)	18
Danish Albums (Hitlisten)	7
Dutch Albums (Album Top 100)	9
Finnish Albums (Suomen virallinen lista)	10
French Albums (SNEP)	106
German Albums (Offizielle Top 100)	69
Irish Albums (IRMA)	7
New Zealand Albums (RMNZ)	23
Norwegian Albums (VG-lista)	1
Scottish Albums (Official Charts)	9
Swedish Albums (Sverigetopplistan)	1
Swiss Albums (Schweizer Hitparade)	37
UK Albums (Official Charts)	11
UK Americana Albums (Official Charts)	4
US Billboard 200	23
US Americana/Folk Albums (Billboard)	2
US Top Rock Albums (Billboard)	8

=== Year-end charts ===
2014 year-end chart performance for Stay Gold
Chart (2014)	Position
Swedish Albums (Sverigetopplistan)	5
US Folk Albums (Billboard)	20

2015 year-end chart performance for Stay Gold
Chart (2015)	Position
Dutch Albums (Album Top 100)	69
Swedish Albums (Sverigetopplistan)	23
UK Albums (OCC)	85

2016 year-end chart performance for Stay Gold
Chart (2016)	Position
Belgian Albums (Ultratop Flanders)	119
Swedish Albums (Sverigetopplistan)	71

== Certifications ==
Certifications for Stay Gold
Region	Certification	Certified units/sales
Sweden (GLF)	Platinum	40,000^{‡}
United Kingdom (BPI)	Gold	100,000^{‡}
^{‡} Sales+streaming figures based on certification alone.
