= My Silver Lining (First Aid Kit song) =

Single by First Aid Kit

from the album Stay Gold
- Released: 31 March 2014
- Genre: Folk
- Length: 3:35
- Label: Columbia
- Songwriters: Klara Söderberg; Johanna Söderberg
- Producer: Mike Mogis

First Aid Kit singles chronology
"Wolf" (2013)	"My Silver Lining" (2014)	"Cedar Lane" (2014)

"My Silver Lining" is a song recorded by Swedish folk band First Aid Kit for their third studio album Stay Gold. Written by Klara and Johanna Söderberg and produced by Mike Mogis, the song was released as the first single from the album. One of the duo's most popular songs, "My Silver Lining" is often performed during the encore of their concerts.

== Use in media ==
"My Silver Lining" was used in the "lightsuit" segment of the short ski film Afterglow, the soundtrack of Wanted (2016 Australian TV series) season 3 episode 5, as the end credits theme in the fifth and final episode of the Telltale Games series Tales from the Borderlands, in the fifth episode of the third season of The Umbrella Academy,, in the series The Good Daughter, and as the ending music for the final episode of Bad Sisters (TV series). This song has also been used for three TV adverts in the UK; American Express, Mercedes Benz and Renault.

== Charts ==
=== Weekly charts ===
Chart (2014–2019)	Peak position
Australia (ARIA)	76
Belgium (Ultratop 50 Flanders)	7
Belgium (Ultratip Bubbling Under Wallonia)	10
France (SNEP)	19
Netherlands (Single Top 100)	50
Sweden (Sverigetopplistan)	38
Switzerland (Schweizer Hitparade)	38
UK Singles Downloads (Official Charts)	31
US Adult Alternative Airplay (Billboard)	22

Chart (2019)	Peak position
Scottish Singles Sales (Official Charts)	24

=== Year-end charts ===
Chart (2016)	Position
Belgium (Ultratop 50 Flanders)	50

== Certifications ==
Region	Certification	Certified units/sales
Denmark (IFPI Danmark)	Gold	45,000^{‡}
New Zealand (RMNZ)	Gold	15,000^{‡}
United Kingdom (BPI)	Platinum	600,000^{‡}
^{‡} Sales+streaming figures based on certification alone.
