= The Lion's Roar (album) =

Studio album by First Aid Kit
- Released: 18 January 2012; 23 January 2012 (UK); 24 January 2012 (US)
- Recorded: ARC Studios, Omaha, United States
- Genre: Indie folk; Americana
- Length: 42:46; 46:16 (iTunes edition); 53:30 (special edition box set)
- Label: Wichita (UK); Redeye (USA)
- Producer: Mike Mogis

First Aid Kit chronology
The Big Black and the Blue (2010)	The Lion's Roar (2012)	Stay Gold (2014)

Singles from The Lion's Roar
- 1. "The Lion's Roar" Released: 7 December 2011; 2. "Emmylou" Released: 10 February 2012; 3. "Blue" Released: 18 June 2012; 4. "Wolf" Released: 17 September 2012

The Lion's Roar is the second studio album by Swedish folk duo First Aid Kit. It was produced by Mike Mogis and features contributions from Bright Eyes' Conor Oberst, Nate Walcott, and The Felice Brothers. The album was released on 18 January 2012.

== Reception ==
Professional ratings
Aggregate scores
Source	Rating
AnyDecentMusic?	7.4/10
Metacritic	81/100
Review scores
Source	Rating
AllMusic	3.5/5 stars
The Daily Telegraph	3/5 stars
The Guardian	4/5 stars
Mojo	4/5 stars
NME	8/10
Pitchfork	7.6/10
Q	4/5 stars
Rolling Stone	3.5/5 stars
Spin	7/10
Uncut	4/5 stars

=== Critical ===
The Lion's Roar received general acclaim from music journalists. The album holds an aggregate score of 81 out of 100 on Metacritic, which indicates "universal acclaim". Rebecca Nicholson of The Guardian commented that it was "a bigger, better record than their debut, rounded out with the confidence of maturity and a smooth, assured indie-country sound." Helen Clarke of musicOMH was similarly positive, stating that "this follow-up could be the album that sees them nudge the likes of Laura Marling and Mumford and Sons out of the way in order to claim a place at the top table." As with the band's previous work, critics praised Klara and Johanna Söderberg's singing, with The Independent highlighting the band's "clear, characterful voices, employed in beautifully modulated, bell-like harmonies."

The album was reissued in the form of a special edition box set on 17 September 2012, featuring additional tracks and a music-video DVD amongst other items.

Rolling Stone named the song "Emmylou" the 10th best song of 2012 and 96th in their list of 100 best songs of the 2010s. At the 2013 annual Grammis Awards, the album won three awards, including album of the year, pop of the year and best album composers of the year.

=== Commercial ===
The album went straight to #1 in Sweden in its first week of release, topping the Swedish Albums Chart. It also reached #35 in its first week on the UK Albums Chart, and has sold 76,759 copies in the UK as of June 2014.

Worldwide, the album has sold over 250,000 copies.

== Track listing ==
All tracks written by Klara and Johanna Söderberg, except where noted.

No.	Title	Writer(s)	Length
1.	"The Lion's Roar"		5:07
2.	"Emmylou"		4:18
3.	"In the Hearts of Men"		4:14
4.	"Blue"		3:12
5.	"This Old Routine"	Söderberg/Söderberg/Joe Andert	4:24
6.	"To a Poet"		5:44
7.	"I Found a Way"		4:13
8.	"Dance to Another Tune"		4:51
9.	"New Year's Eve"		3:07
10.	"King of the World"	Söderberg/Söderberg/Conor Oberst	3:39

iTunes bonus track
No.	Title	Length
11.	"Wolf"	3:40

Japanese edition
No.	Title	Length
11.	"Some Distant Memory"	5:05
12.	"The Lion's Roar" (live on KCRW)	4:29

Special edition box set bonus tracks
No.	Title	Length
11.	"Wolf"	3:40
12.	"Marianne's Son"	3:35
13.	"I Just Needed a Friend"	3:29

== Official videos ==
The Lion's Roar (2011) on YouTube
Emmylou (2012) on YouTube
Blue (2012) on YouTube
Wolf (2012) on YouTube

== Notes ==
- During the second episode of the Dontnod Entertainment's 2019 video game Life Is Strange 2, one of the characters covered the song "I Found a Way". The original version of the song is featured in the end credits of that episode.
- Bluegrass duo Darin and Brooke Aldridge covered "Emmylou" for their 2019 album Inner Journey.
- The Lion’s Roar is used as the main theme for Hinterland Studio’s 2017 video game The Long Dark in the story mode.

== Credits ==
- Keyboards, autoharp, vocals – Johanna Söderberg
- Vocals, guitar – Klara Söderberg
- Bass guitar – Benkt Söderberg (Cuts 1, 3, 4, 6, 7, 8, 10)
- Drums, percussion – Mattias Bergqvist (Cuts 1–8; 10)
- Orchestral arrangements - Nate Walcott
- Piano – Nate Walcott (Cuts 4–7)
- Trumpet – Nate Walcott (Cut 10)
- B3 organ – Nate Walcott (Cut 9)
- Piano – Ben Brodin (Cuts 1–3; 7)
- Accordion – James Felice (Cut 10)
- Vocals – Conor Oberst (Cut 10)
- Engineer, mixing and producer; mandolin, pedal steel, percussion, claps, vibes, autoharp, electric guitar, hammer dulcimer – Mike Mogis

== Charts and certifications ==
=== Weekly charts ===
Chart (2012)	Peak position
Australian Albums (ARIA)	36
Austrian Albums (Ö3 Austria)	55
Belgian Albums (Ultratop Flanders)	30
Belgian Albums (Ultratop Wallonia)	88
Danish Albums (Hitlisten)	14
Dutch Albums (Album Top 100)	41
Finnish Albums (Suomen virallinen lista)	19
German Albums (Offizielle Top 100)	69
Norwegian Albums (VG-lista)	3
Swedish Albums (Sverigetopplistan)	1
Swiss Albums (Schweizer Hitparade)	76
UK Albums (OCC)	35
UK Independent Albums (OCC)	5
US Billboard 200	65
US Americana/Folk Albums (Billboard)	4
US Independent Albums (Billboard)	12
US Top Rock Albums (Billboard)	17
US Indie Store Album Sales (Billboard)	11
Chart (2015)	Peak position
Scottish Albums (OCC)	43

=== Year-end charts ===
Chart (2012)	Position
Swedish Albums (Sverigetopplistan)	4
US Folk Albums (Billboard)	24
Chart (2013)	Position
Swedish Albums (Sverigetopplistan)	33
Chart (2014)	Position
Swedish Albums (Sverigetopplistan)	34

=== Certifications and sales ===
Region	Certification	Certified units/sales
Norway	—	11,000
Sweden (GLF)	Platinum	40,000^{‡}
United Kingdom (BPI)	Gold	76,759
^{‡} Sales+streaming figures based on certification alone.
