= First Aid Kit (band) =

Swedish folk duo

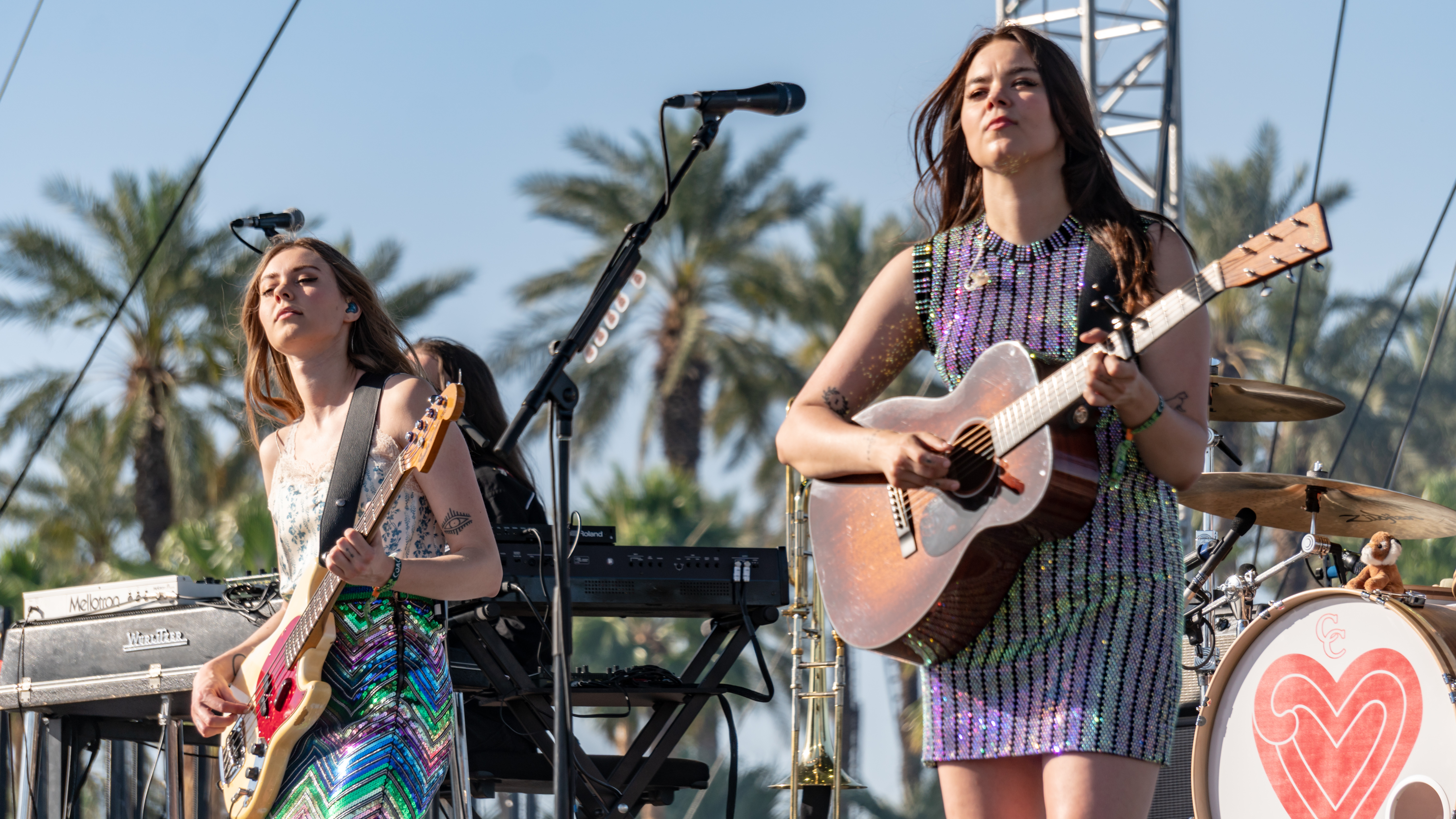
- First Aid Kit performing live at Coachella in 2018

Background information
- Origin: Svedmyra, Stockholm, Sweden
- Genres: Folk; indie folk; Americana; country folk
- Years active: 2007–present
- Labels: Rabid; Wichita; Columbia
- Members: Johanna Söderberg; Klara Söderberg
- Website: firstaidkitband.com

First Aid Kit is a Swedish folk duo consisting of the sisters Johanna and Klara Söderberg, born in 1990 and 1993 respectively. When performing live, they are accompanied by a drummer, a guitarist and a keyboard player. First Aid Kit started to become internationally known in 2008 with their YouTube uploaded cover of the Fleet Foxes' song "Tiger Mountain Peasant Song". In 2012 Rolling Stone magazine had their song "Emmylou" as 10th on their "Single of the Year" list. First Aid Kit has released five albums, four EPs and several singles. In 2015, they were nominated for a Brit Award as one of the five best international groups. They were nominated again in 2019 and 2023.

== Early history ==
Sisters Johanna (born 31 October 1990) and Klara (born 8 January 1993) Söderberg are from Enskede, in Stockholm. Their father Benkt Söderberg was a member of the Swedish pop rock band Lolita Pop, but quit before Johanna was born and became a teacher of history and religion. Their mother teaches cinematography.

From childhood, Klara and Johanna were eager singers, giving concerts using a jump rope as a pretend microphone. Klara's favorite songs were Judy Garland's songs from The Wizard of Oz and Billie Holiday's version of "Gloomy Sunday", which she sang without much understanding of the English lyrics. Klara wrote her first song, "Femton mil i min Barbiebil" [Fifteen Scandinavian miles in my Barbie car], when she was six.

Klara and Johanna both attended the Internationella Engelska Skolan (International English School) of Enskede. Klara applied for admission to Adolf Fredrik's Music School, but was not accepted.

In 2005, when Klara was 12, a friend introduced her to the band Bright Eyes. This led her to country and folk music stars such as Johnny Cash, Bob Dylan, Leonard Cohen, the Carter Family, Louvin Brothers, Townes Van Zandt, Gram Parsons and Emmylou Harris. The same year, she received a guitar as a Christmas present and quickly learned to play it.

Johanna enjoyed a wide range of music, from Britney Spears to German techno. When she saw the film O Brother, Where Art Thou? and listened to its soundtrack, she was inspired to sing "Down in the River to Pray" with Klara. Fascinated by the result, the two began to sing together, first at home and then as street singers in the Stockholm Metro and in front of liquor stores. Klara chose the name for their band at age 13 by looking through a dictionary. She found the term "first aid kit" and thought it best described what she wanted her music to be.

Klara and Johanna began to write their own country-folk songs inspired by Devendra Banhart and CocoRosie, among others, without much influence from their parents, who were fonder of Patti Smith, Velvet Underground and the Pixies. Their father has said that he was astonished and a little jealous of the ease his daughters had in producing their music. The most important advice their father gave them was to sing so loud that even somebody behind a wall could hear it.

== Career ==
=== 2007–2009: Beginnings and Drunken Trees EP ===
In April 2007, the sisters began to upload their self-made songs to the social networking site MySpace. They also sent a demo of their song "Tangerine" to Swedish radio. It immediately went on air and was listed as one of the best songs of the summer 2007, which led to requests for live performances and even some offers from record companies. The first official performance as First Aid Kit was at PUNKTmedis library in Stockholm on 6 October. More performances followed, but as Klara was 14 and still at school, they could only play during weekends.

Coincidentally, their younger brother attended the same kindergarten as the daughter of Karin Dreijer, half of Swedish electronic duo The Knife, also known as Fever Ray. Their mother asked Dreijer to check out her daughters' songs on MySpace. The band subsequently signed with Rabid Records, a label co-owned by The Knife, with conditions that allowed the duo to have full control over their music and album art.

In April 2008, the band released their debut EP Drunken Trees in Sweden, and made their first appearance on Swedish TV. The EP was produced by their father, and was a re-recorded collection of songs from their MySpace, originally entitled "Cross Oceans".

The duo was relatively well known in Sweden by August 2008, when they uploaded a cover version of "Tiger Mountain Peasant Song" by Fleet Foxes to YouTube. Robin Pecknold, frontman and lead guitarist for Fleet Foxes, praised the cover on his band's webpage, causing a surge in popularity for the video. This exposure led to international recognition, and by the end of 2008, the duo had signed a record deal with Wichita Records.

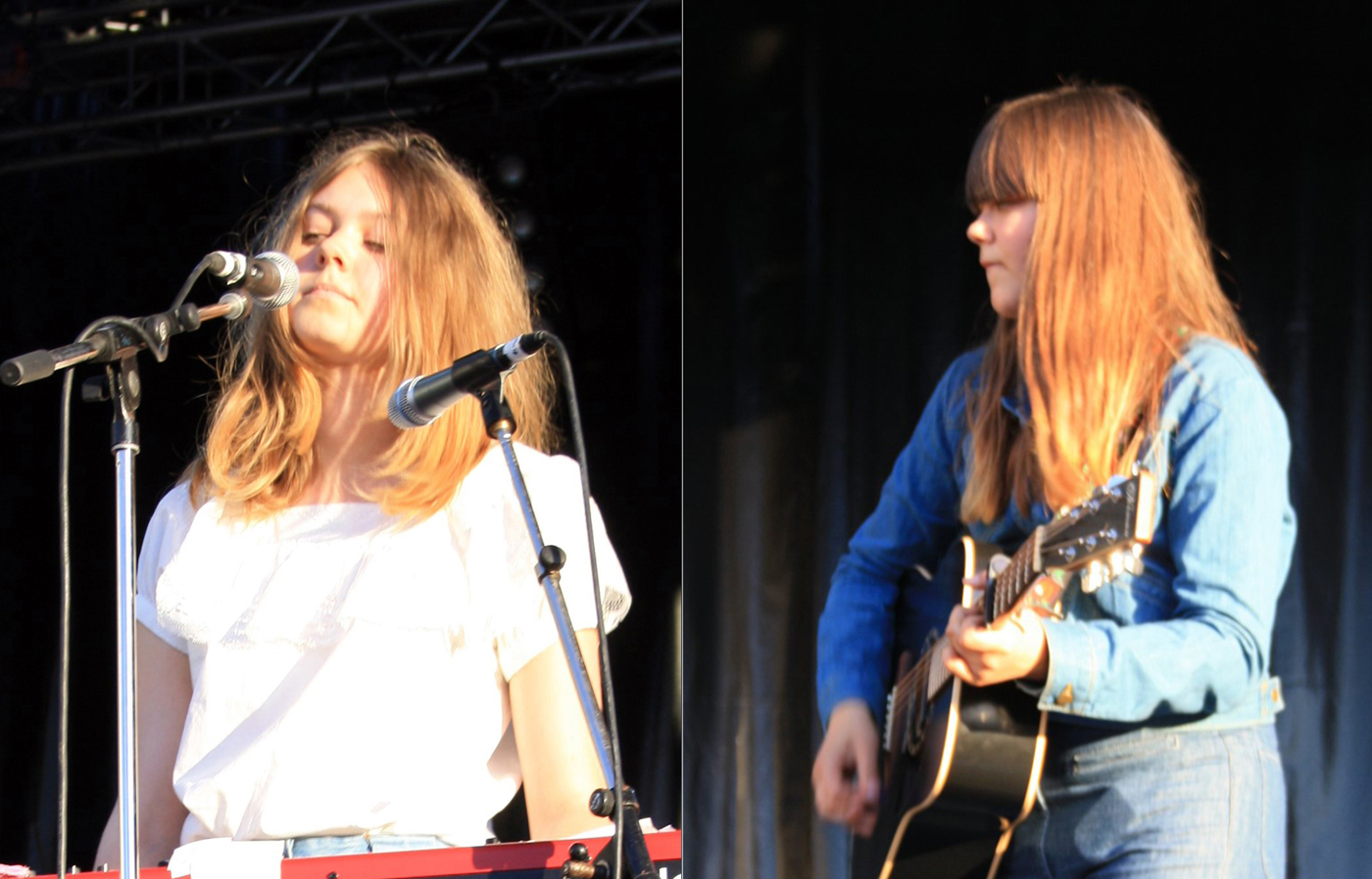
Johanna (left) and Klara Söderberg in Wiesbaden in 2009

Due to international touring, Johanna quit high school in the autumn of 2008 (and Klara never started). Their father took a leave from his job as a teacher and accompanied them on tour. First Aid Kit's first show outside Scandinavia took place on 22 November 2008 at the Crossing Border Festival in Netherlands. Fleet Foxes performed the day before, and when Pecknold spotted the duo standing at the edge of the stage, they were spontaneously asked to join to sing "Tiger Mountain Peasant Song".

Wichita re-released Drunken Trees on 23 February 2009 as an enhanced EP, with "Tiger Mountain Peasant Song" added as a bonus track, along with several videos.

=== 2010–2011: The Big Black and the Blue ===
The duo released their first album, The Big Black and the Blue on 1 February 2010. As with the Drunken Trees EP, the album was again produced by their father. The release was followed by an extensive tour throughout the United States, Canada, Australia, New Zealand and parts of Europe, including Primavera Sound Festival in Barcelona.

On 19 November 2009, Klara and Johanna met Conor Oberst after Monsters of Folk's concert in Stockholm, and gave him a demo of their coming album. Oberst watched the duo perform at the Austin City Limits Music Festival pre-party in Texas on 7 October 2010. At this concert, he was especially impressed by the duo's acoustic performance of Ghost Town, which the audience listened to in rapt silence. After meeting the duo, Oberst called Mike Mogis and asked him to see the duo's performance at the ACL Festival two days later, on 9 October. After watching this performance, Mogis offered to produce the duo's next album.

Two days later, on 11 October 2010, after playing a concert in Nashville, the duo received a telephone call from Jack White, who asked the duo to visit his studio the next day. The result was a vinyl single containing cover versions of Buffy Sainte-Marie's "Universal Soldier" and Mel London's and Tampa Red's "It Hurts Me Too". The single was released on White's Third Man Records label.

First Aid Kit performed at the Polar Music Prize gala on 30 August 2011 in Stockholm, where they performed the song "Dancing Barefoot" for the winner Patti Smith. Smith was moved to tears at the intense ending of the song.

Johanna, under the moniker MoA, released song covers of K-Pop artists such as 2NE1 and 4Minute during 2010 to 2011. The covers were deleted after her identity was inadvertently revealed.

=== 2012–2013: The Lion's Roar ===
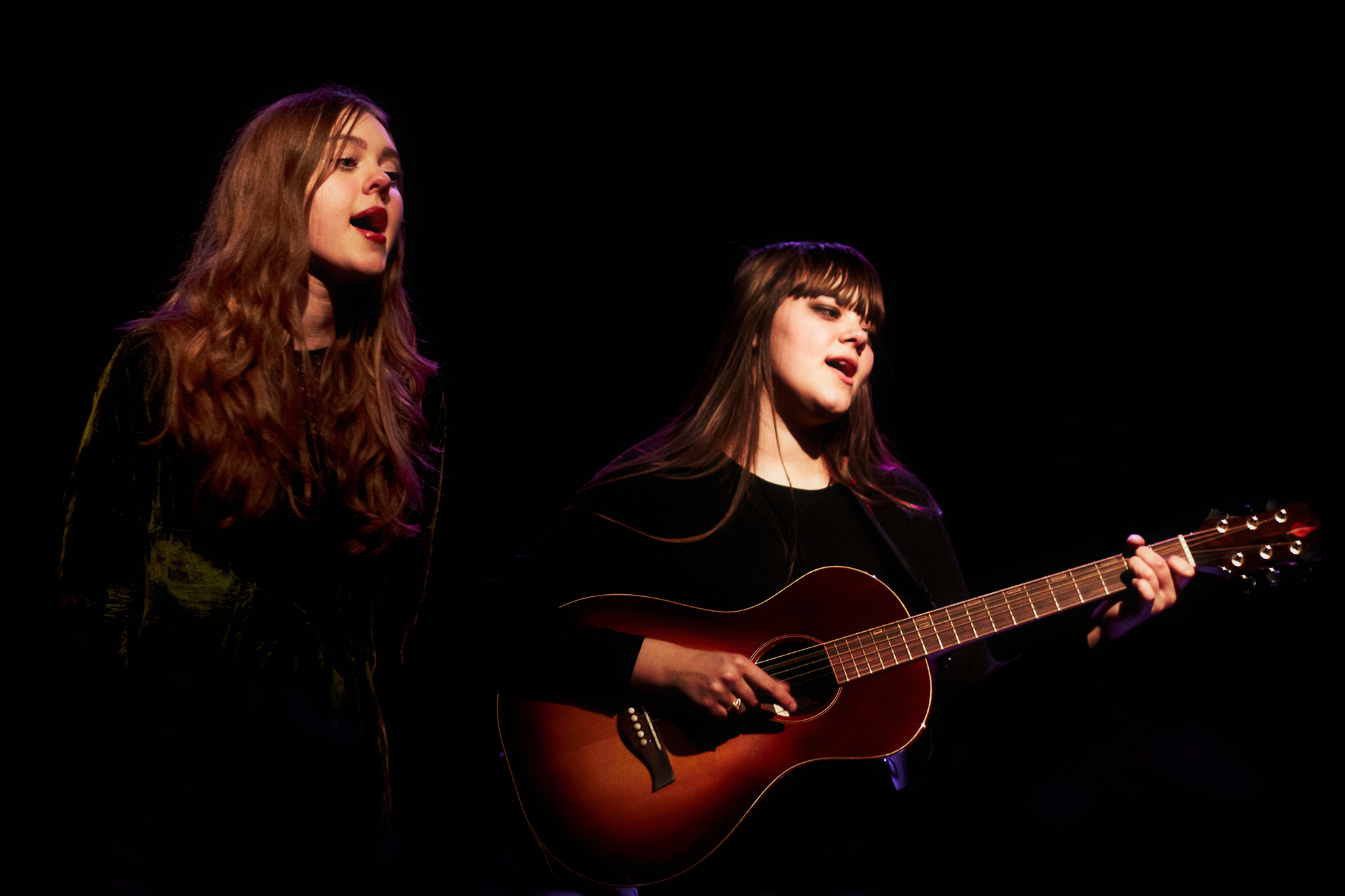
First Aid Kit (Frankfurt am Main, 18 February 2012)

In January 2012, the band released their second album, The Lion's Roar, produced by Mike Mogis. The album was critically acclaimed, debuting at number one in Sweden and number 35 in the UK. The duo toured extensively in support of the album, including performances at several major festivals. The duo performed the song "Emmylou" on Conan in April 2012, and on The Late Show with David Letterman in October 2012.

On 28 August 2012, they performed "America" for the Polar Music Prize winner Paul Simon, who gave the duo a standing ovation.

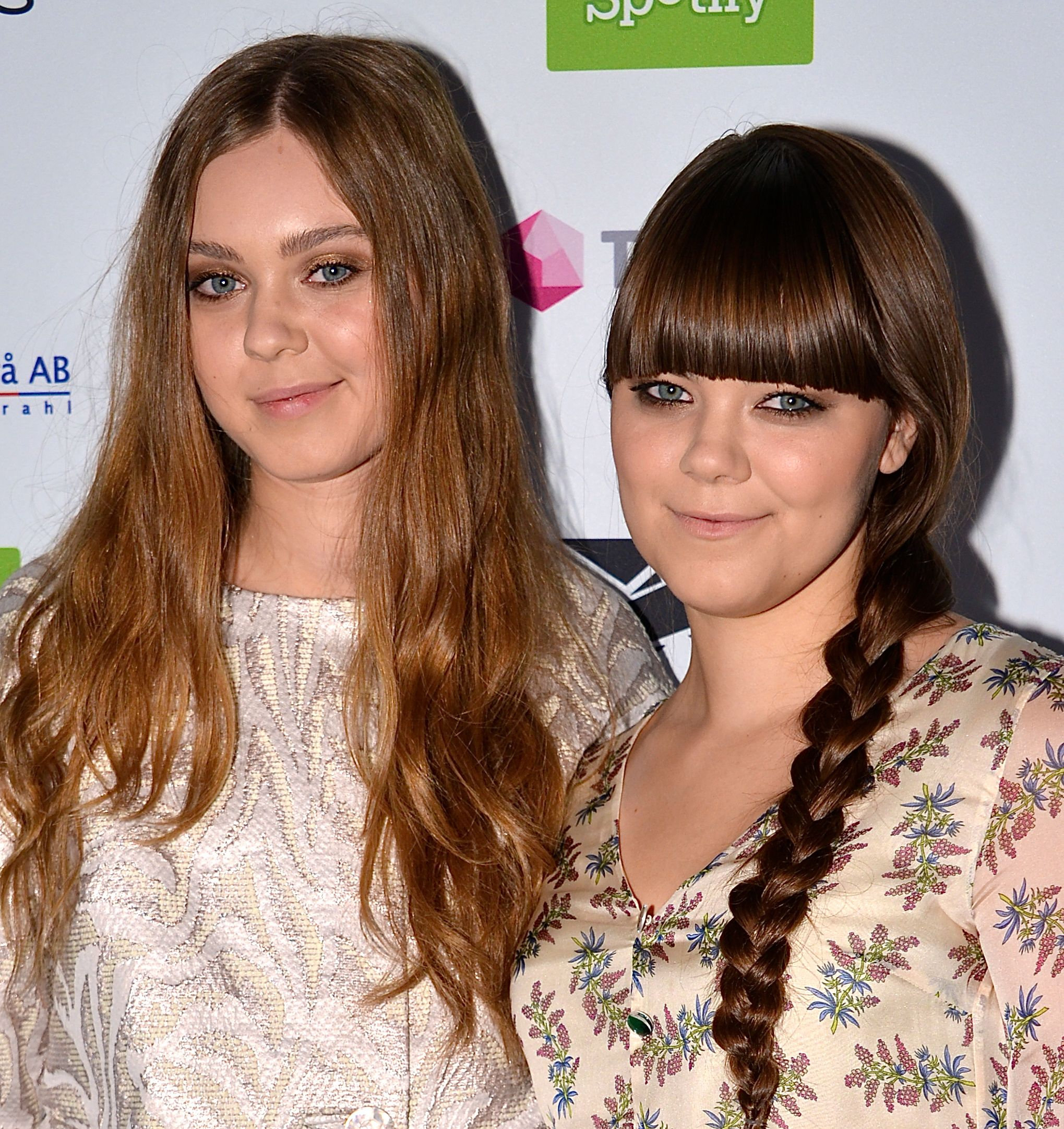
Johanna and Klara Söderberg at the Swedish Grammis Awards in 2013

The song "The Lion's Roar" was featured in episode 2 of series 4 of Misfits, and in the opening sequence of the video game "The Long Dark". "In the Hearts of Men" was featured in episode 21 of season 8 of Bones. The song "I Found a Way" appeared in the second episode of the Dontnod Entertainment's 2019 video game Life Is Strange 2 in 2019.

In November 2012, the duo received awards for "Composer of the year" and "Breakthrough of the Year" from the Swedish Music Publishers Association. The song "Emmylou" was listed at 10th position by Rolling Stone magazine in their "Single of the Year" list of 2012. In February 2013, First Aid Kit was awarded the Nordic Music Prize for Best Nordic 2012 Album. They were also awarded four Swedish Grammis awards for 2012 "Artist of the Year", "Songwriter of the Year", "Best Pop of the Year" and "Album of the Year".

=== 2014–2016: Stay Gold ===
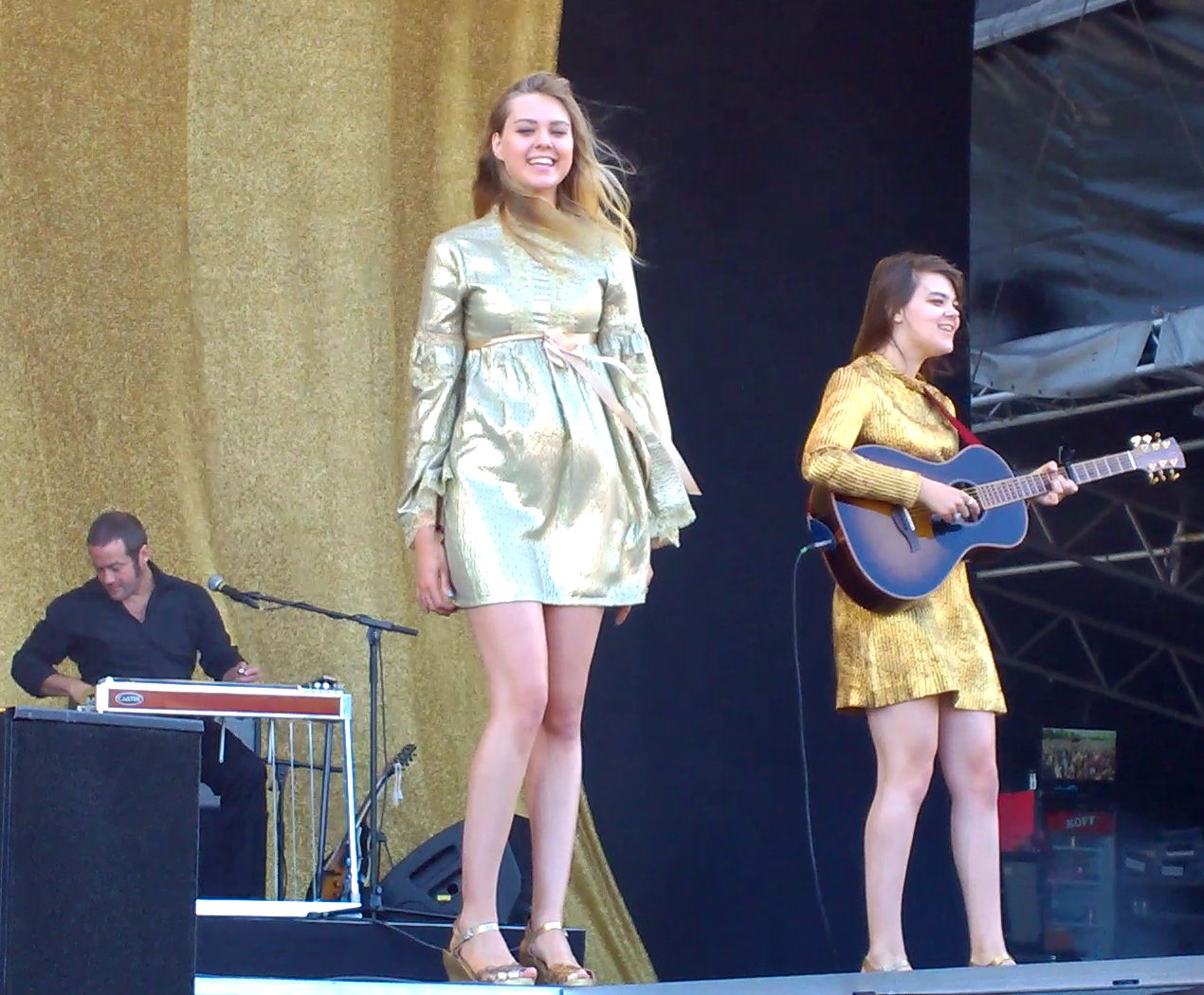
First Aid Kit at Ruisrock 6 July 2014

Their third studio album, Stay Gold, was released on 10 June 2014 through Columbia Records. The band released two singles from the album: "My Silver Lining" and "Cedar Lane". As a result, the duo again received the "Composer of the year" prize from the Swedish Music Publishers Association. In January 2015, First Aid Kit was nominated for the 2015 Brit Awards in the Best International Group category as one of five nominees, and won the "Best group of the year" prize in the Swedish Radio P3 Gold Gala. In the same month, the band was featured on a Swedish postage stamp. The album Stay Gold was listed at number 6 in the Paste magazine's 40 best folk albums of the 2010s list.

First Aid Kit began touring again in May 2014, visiting North America, Europe, Japan and Australia. The final performance was on 15 August 2015, at Way Out West Festival in Gothenburg, Sweden. Except for two Christmas concerts with Seinabo Sey, Amanda Bergman and Maja Francis on 13 December 2015 in Stockholm, the duo performed no concerts again until summer 2017, as they needed a break in order to prepare the new record.

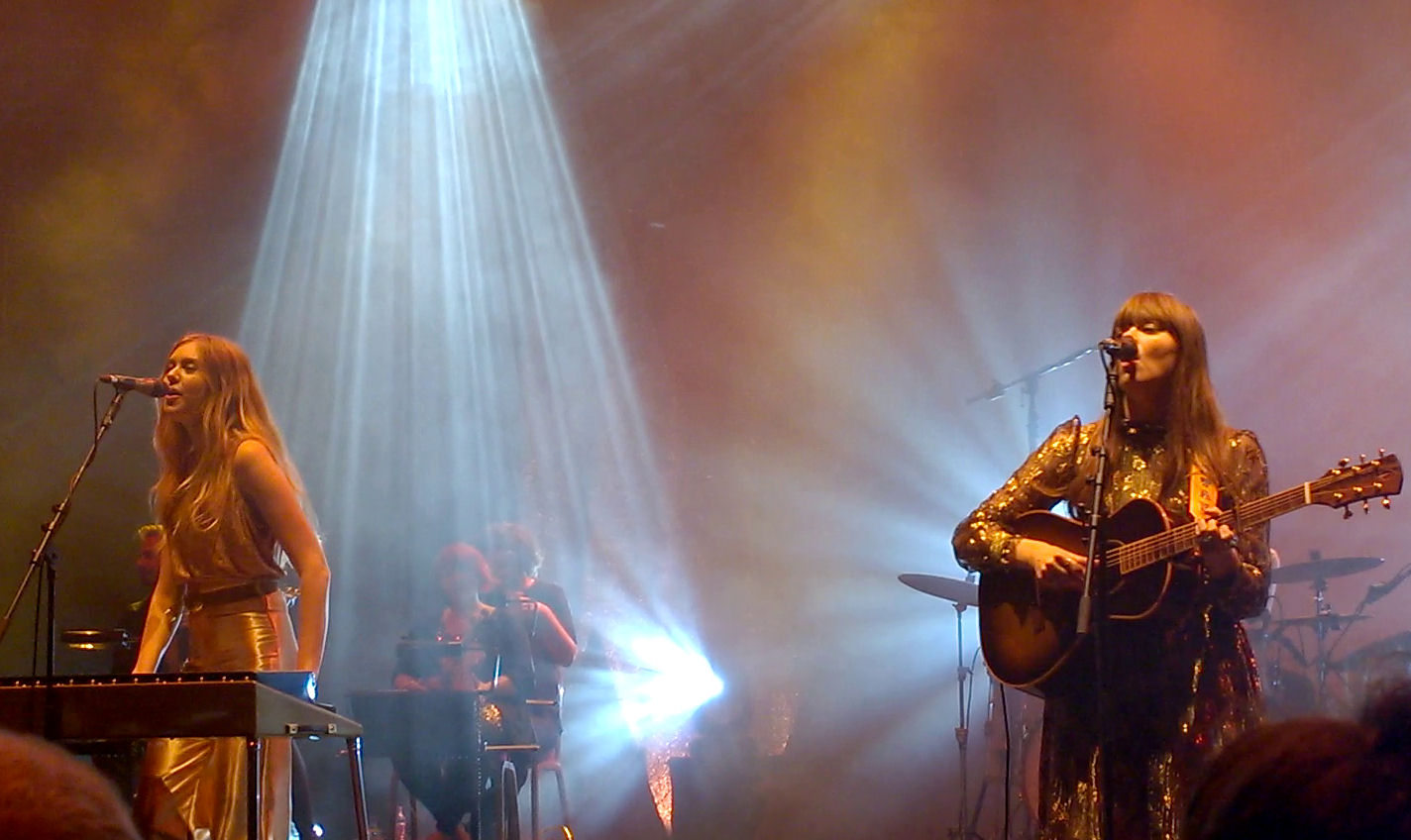
First Aid Kit accompanied by Stockholm Strings at Royal Albert Hall, London on 24 September 2014

During 2014-2016 they performed twice on The Late Show with David Letterman. and on Later... with Jools Holland. They also appeared on Conan, The Ellen DeGeneres Show, The Graham Norton Show and CBS This Morning TV show. On 9 June 2015, they performed "Red Dirt Girl" and "Emmylou" for the Polar Music Prize winner Emmylou Harris in the TV broadcast gala at Stockholm, Sweden. They also performed covers songs by Bob Dylan and other folk singers on several Swedish TV programs.

The duo sing harmonies on six tracks of Conor Oberst's album Upside Down Mountain released on 20 May 2014. The duo sang backing vocals on five songs of Conor Oberst's set at Haldern Pop Festival in Germany on 9 August. They also contributed vocals to the title track of Jenny Lewis's album The Voyager, released on 29 July 2014. On 28 November 2014, First Aid Kit's 10" vinyl single "America" was released as a Black Friday record store day release. They sang backing vocals on Van William's single "Revolution", released on 7 September 2016. The song was subsequently included on Van William's album Countries, released in January 2018, and peaked at number six on the US AAA chart.

At the end of October 2014, it was announced that First Aid Kit's cover of R.E.M.'s "Walk Unafraid" would be included on the soundtrack of the movie Wild. Moreover, their song "Frozen Lake" appeared in the Swedish film Min Så Kallade Pappa.

=== 2017: Singles and resumed touring ===
At the beginning of 2017 Klara and Johanna were at Flora Recording & Playback in Portland, Oregon, finishing their fourth album.

In early 2017, First Aid Kit provided backing vocals for Jesper Lindell's A Little Less Blue EP, which was produced by Sten Booberg and the duo's father, Benkt Söderberg. The EP was released on 21 April 2017.

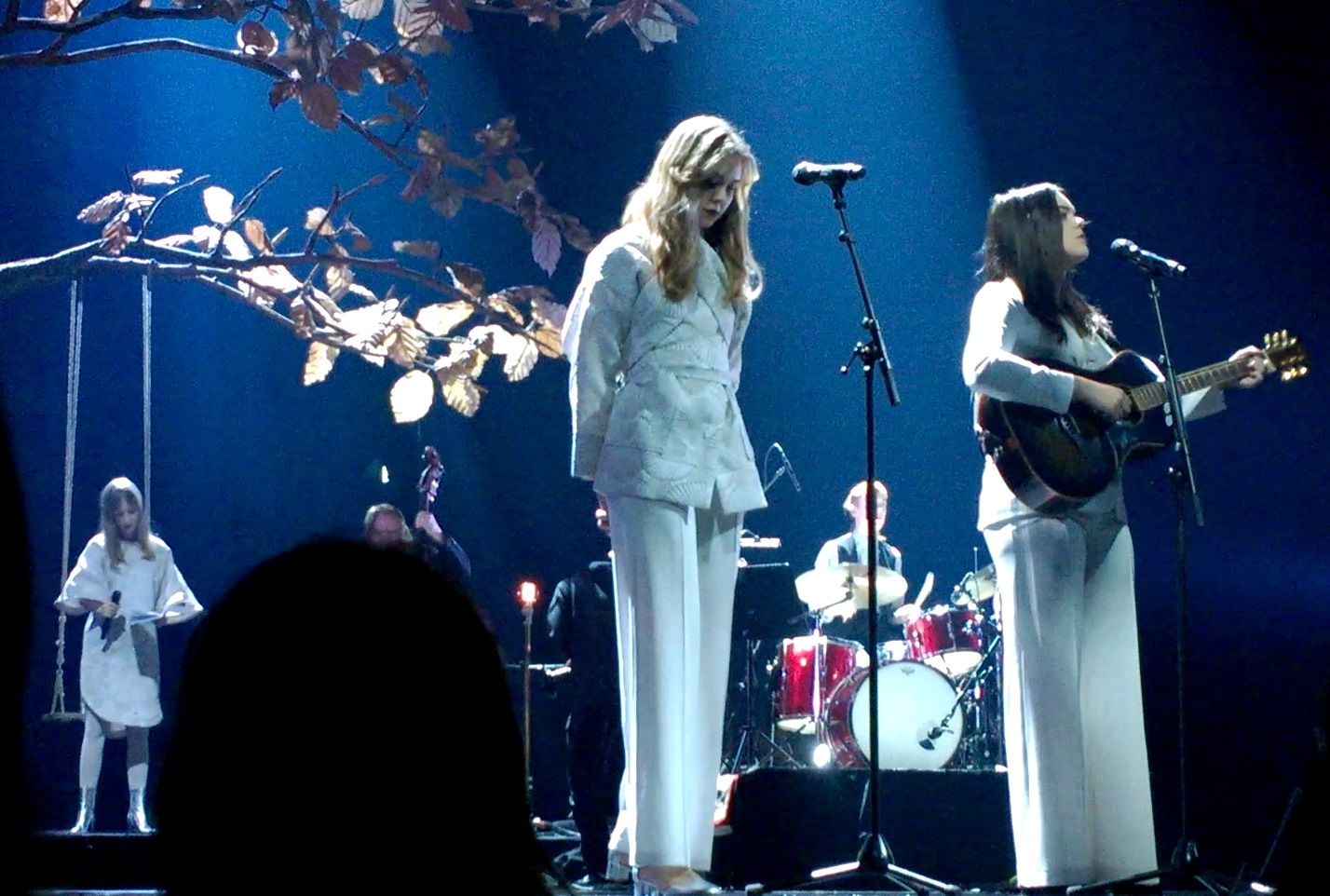
First Aid Kit at their Leonard Cohen tribute concert in Dramaten, Stockholm, Sweden 13 March 2017

On 10 March, First Aid Kit released a new single, "You Are the Problem Here", for International Women's Day. The band called the song an angry song, inspired by yet another story of a man getting off easy after raping a woman. The track was produced and mixed by Tucker Martine from Flora Recording & Playback studio. A 7-inch vinyl copy of "You Are the Problem Here" was released on Record Store Day 2018. All profits from the song are donated to Women for Women International.

First Aid Kit held four Leonard Cohen-themed concerts in Spring 2017 with their friends in Dramaten, Stockholm, Sweden. Their concert on 13 March was filmed by Sveriges Television, and broadcast on 14 and 15 October by SVT2. An audio recording of the concert was released on 26 March 2021.

On Record Store Day 2017, Third Man Records published the book The Blue Series: The Story Behind the Color, which contains a story by Johanna and Klara about recording songs in Jack White's studio, and a 7-inch split blue vinyl single with the band's previously unreleased cover of "Gloomy Sunday". The record store day issue was limited to 500 copies. A regular release on black vinyl single was released on 6 June.

Johanna and Klara sang several songs with Håkan Hellström at concerts on 9 and 10 June at Stockholm Olympic Stadium, and on 28 and 29 July at Ullevi stadium in Gothenburg. On 25 August, Håkan Hellström published a live recording of "Du Fria" in digital format.

First Aid Kit resumed touring in Summer 2017, beginning with a concert on 16 June in Borgholm, Sweden. BBC broadcast their performance at Glastonbury Festival on 23 June, during which they performed two songs from their upcoming album Ruins: "Fireworks" and "It's a Shame".

During Fall 2017, the band gave several interviews in the UK and European media, including the German late night show Inas Nacht (Ina's Night), BBC Radio, Channel 4 TV news and the Channel 4 Sunday Brunch TV programme. Their performances of "Perfect Places" and "Have Yourself a Merry Little Christmas" were released as "Live From BBC Radio 2" singles in digital format on 18 December 2017.

=== 2018–2019: Ruins ===
On 12 January 2018, First Aid Kit performed "It's a Shame" on BBC's Graham Norton Show. Johanna and Klara were also interviewed on the Norwegian-Swedish TV show Skavlan, where they performed "Fireworks".

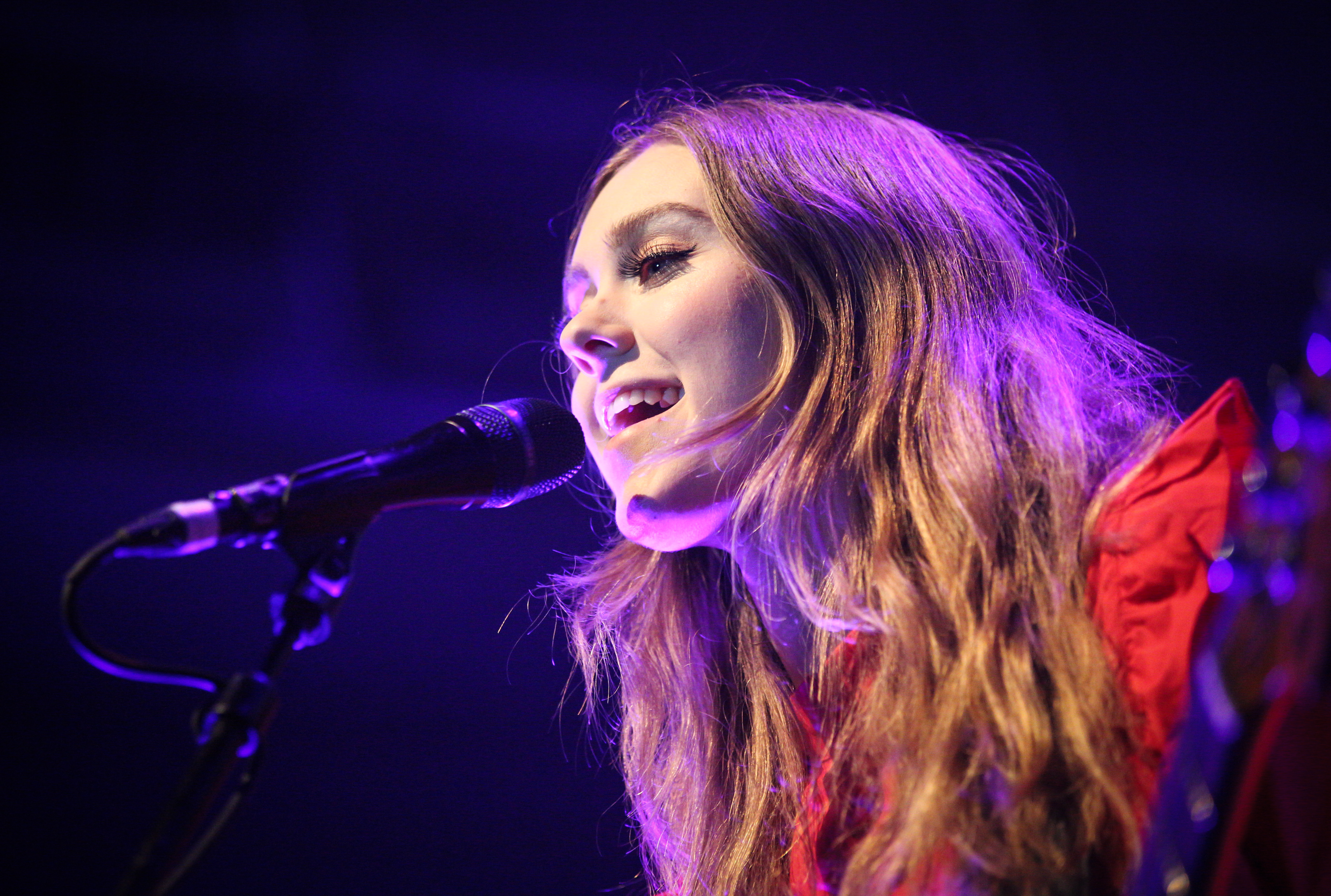
Johanna, Palace Theatre - St. Paul, Minnesota, 2018

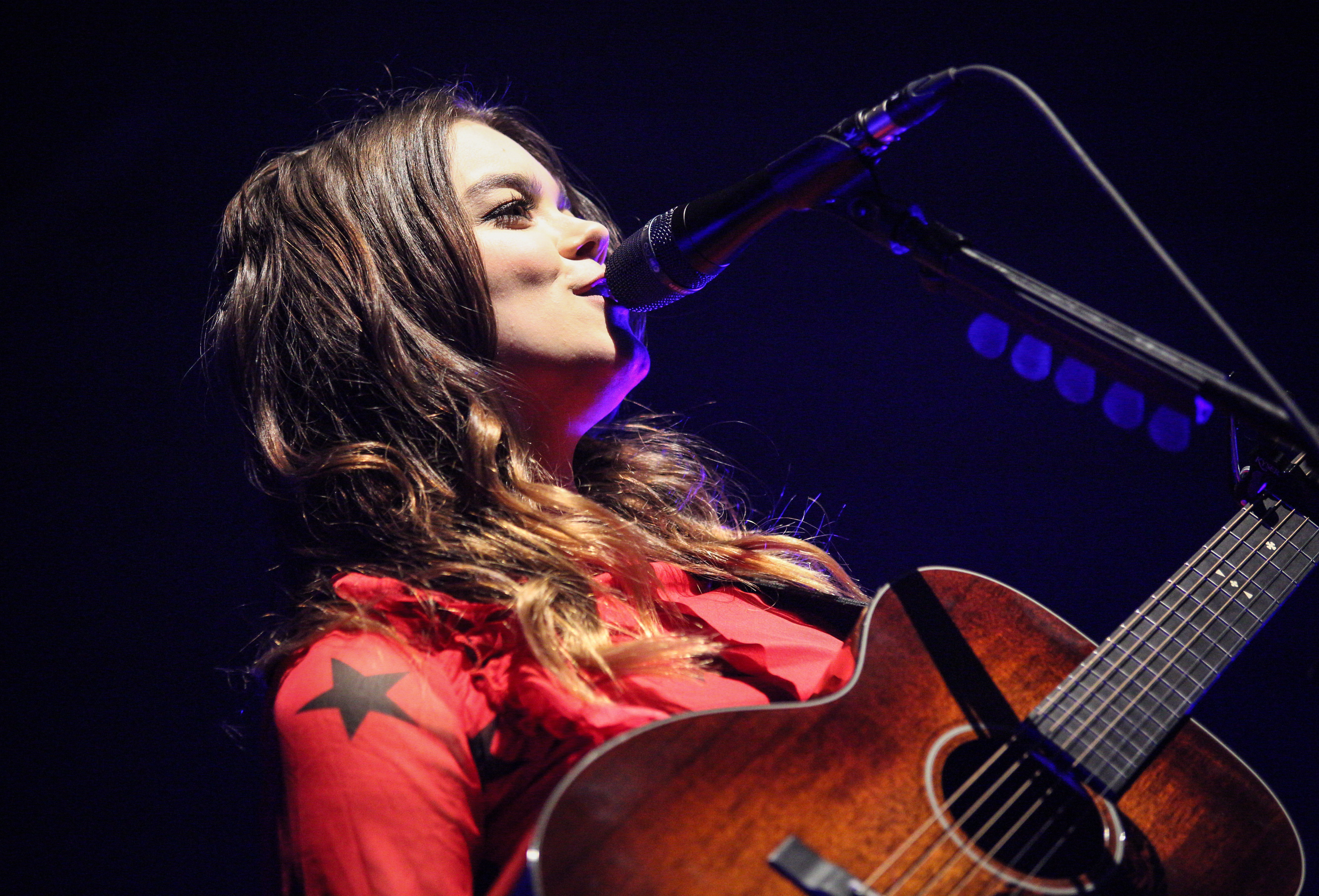
Klara, Palace Theatre - St. Paul, Minnesota, 2018

The album Ruins was released on 19 January 2018. The album was recorded at Flora Recording & Playback in Portland, Oregon, and contained 10 new songs. The album was certified Gold in Sweden in August, and Silver in the UK in November. The release was followed by a tour throughout Canada, the US, Europe and Australia, including performances at Coachella on 14 and 21 April 2018. During this period, they also performed on several radio and TV programs such as The Ellen DeGeneres Show, The Andrew Marr Show, Jimmy Kimmel Live! and The Late Show with Stephen Colbert. The songs on Ruins album are related with Klara's breakup with her boyfriend, but performing the songs on tour was hard for Johanna too as she had broken up with her boyfriend in January 2018 shortly after the album release.

On 11 July, Spotify released a stripped-down version of "Fireworks" and a cover of Kate Bush's song "Running Up That Hill" as singles that were recorded in the new Spotify studio in Stockholm. On 14 September, the vinyl EP Tender Offerings was released, containing four previously unreleased tracks. The EP reached number one on the UK vinyl charts.

First Aid Kit sang backing vocals on several 2018 releases, including Alela Diane's song Ether & Wood from the album Cusp, George Ezra's song "Saviour" from the album Staying at Tamara's, and on Little Jinder's song Goldwing from the album Hejdå.

In November 2018, Ruins was nominated for International Album of the Year at the 2019 UK Americana Awards. The band also received two Swedish Grammis award nominations in 2019, one for Song of the Year for "Fireworks," and another for Alternative Pop Album of the Year for Ruins. In January 2019, they were again nominated for the International Group Brit Award.

The duo's song "Home Again" appeared on the soundtrack for the TV show Moominvalley, which was released on 19 April.

On 18 May 2019, the duo canceled all planned 2019 summer dates due to unforeseen medical circumstances. It was later revealed that the concerts were canceled because Klara was experiencing burnout.

Klara wrote "Strange Beauty" after the suicide of David Berman. The track was published on 22 August, along with their cover of "Random Rules" by Berman's band Silver Jews.

On 16 October 2019, the duo received the Ulla Billquist scholarship, which is awarded each year to female artists who enrich the Swedish music scene through their artistry.

On 11 December, First Aid Kit played three songs at the Swedish TV's charity program Musikhjälpen with Maja Francis. First Aid Kit had Christmas-themed shows on December 17, 18 and 19 in Stockholm with Amanda Bergman and Maja Francis.

=== 2020–2021: Streams, covers and collaborations during COVID-19 pandemic ===
On 13 January 2020, Johanna announced that she was expecting a baby in the summer, and her daughter was born on 18 June. On 16 January, Klara announced that she will start a country club in Stockholm with a house band. The first event was held on 21 February, right before the concert venues were closed due to the pandemic. During spring 2020 COVID-19 lockdowns the band streamed live concerts from Johanna's home.

On 14 August 2020, First Aid Kit released a cover version of Willie Nelson's song "On the Road Again". Proceeds from the song were donated to Crew Nation, to support crew members who were forced out of work due to COVID-19 pandemic. On 25 September, they released two cover versions of Ted Gärdestad's "Come Give Me Love", one sung with the original Swedish lyrics, and the other with their own translation of the lyrics into English. In 2021 the band performed on some Swedish TV-programs.

Suzanne single from the Who by Fire live album recorded in 2017 at the Leonard Cohen tribute concert was released in February 2021 and the full album on 26 March 2021.

First Aid Kit appear as the Treetaur Shamans named Big Tree (voiced by Johanna) and Little Tree (voiced by Klara) in both the original English version and Swedish dub of Season 1 Episode 4 of the Netflix series Centaurworld. They reprised their roles in Season 2.

First Aid Kit appear on Thomas Stenström's song "Hotel Amigo" on his album Spring Baby Spring, released on 17 September 2021; Maja Francis' song "Mama" on her album A Pink Soft Mess released on 24 September 2021; and on Thåström's single "Isbergen" released on 15 October 2021. The duo appear on Thåström's song "Södra Korset" as well.

=== 2022–2023: Palomino and new backing band ===
On 19 January 2022 First Aid Kit streamed Lion's Roar 10th anniversary concert from Mosebacke Etablissement, Stockholm with brothers Johannes and Gabriel Runemark who will be new band members.

On 8 March 2022 Swedish TV4 aired combined cooking and music program "Benjamin's" episode where Klara and Johanna were guests. The Swedish version of Come Give Me Love performed with Benjamin Ingrosso in the show was released as a single in various streaming services.

First Aid Kit started touring in June 2022 and released the first single Angel from their fifth album Palomino. They played at the Glastonbury Festival on 24 June with Freja Drakenberg, Gabriel Runemark and Johannes Runemark. At the end of July they released a cover of Don Henley's The Boys of Summer as a single in various streaming services. Second single, Out of My Head from the album was released on 12 August, the third one Turning Onto You, on 30 September. and the fourth, A Feeling That Never Came, on 20 October. Palomino was released on 4 November 2022. Extensive touring followed the album release. On 7 July 2023 deluxe edition of Palomino album was released with five new tracks added in streaming services and lyric video of Everybody's Got to Learn was published.

On 12 January 2023 First Aid Kit was nominated third time for the International Group of the Year Brit award. On 3 May 2023 First Aid Kit won Swedish Grammis award for Palomino in the 2023 alternative pop category.

First Aid Kit appear on Tove Lo's song Cute & Cruel on her 14 October 2022 released album Dirt Femme, on Pink's song Kids in Love on her 17 February 2023 released album Trustfall, on M. Ward's songs Too Young To Die and Engine 5 on his Supernatural Thing album that was released on 23 June and on Lola Kirke's song All My Exes Live in L.A. that will be on her 16 February 2024 released EP Country Curious.

=== 2024-: More children and some performances ===
On 9 October 2023 Johanna announced that she was expecting her second baby. In spite of this, First Aid Kit had a tour in Scandinavia that started on 30 October from Gothenburg. Due to re-scheduling of some of the concerts the last one was on 15 January 2024 in Oslo, Norway A baby girl was born on 26 March 2024. During spring 2024 Klara toured with Hair musical in Sweden.

In January 2025, they featured as the house band in SVT's På spåret. The next live performances were in Stockholm with Swedish Radio Symphony Orchestra on 30 January, 31 January and two concerts on 1 February 2025. The orchestra was conducted by Erik Arvinder, with the band consisting of Rasmus Lindelöw: keyboard; Ola Gustafsson: guitar, pedal steel, mandolin, vocals; Johannes Runemark: guitar, mandolin, vocals; Gabriel Runemark: drums, vocals Official video of the concerts was published by Swedish radio in June 2025 that will be online until end of July 2025.

On 24 January 2025 Klara announced that she was expecting a baby in the summer. A baby girl was born in July.

On 4 June 2025 Domino Recording Company announced that James Yorkston will release his new album Songs for Nina and Johanna on 22 August 2025 where Johanna Söderberg and Nina Persson are singing with him. First single release from the album sung with Johanna is Love / Luck.

== Band members ==
=== Line-up ===
- Klara Söderberg – vocals, guitar, keyboards (2007–present)
- Johanna Söderberg – bass guitar, vocals, keyboards, autoharp (2007–present)
- Freja "Freja the Dragon" Drakenberg – keyboards (2022–present)
- Scott Simpson – drums (2015–2019 and occasionally to present. He is also the band's long time tour manager)
- Gabriel Runemark - drums (2022–present)
- Johannes Runemark (a.k.a. Kasino) – guitar and mandolin (2022–present)

=== Previous members ===
- Mattias Bergqvist – drums (2009–2012)
- Niclas Lindström – drums (2012–2014)
- Melvin Duffy – pedal steel guitar, mandolin and electric guitar (2013–2019)
- Steve Moore – keyboards, trombone (2017–2019)

== Discography ==
=== Studio albums ===
List of studio albums, with selected chart positions, sales figures and certifications
Title	Album details	Peak chart positions										Sales	Certifications
Title	Album details	SWE	AUS	BEL (FL)	DEN	FIN	NLD	NOR	SWI	UK	US	Sales	Certifications
The Big Black and the Blue	Release date: 25 January 2010; Record label: Wichita	30	—	—	—	—	—	—	—	—	—		
The Lion's Roar	Release date: 18 January 2012; Record label: Wichita	1	36	30	14	19	41	3	76	35	65	WW: 250,000	GLF: Platinum; BPI: Gold
Stay Gold	Release date: 10 June 2014; Record label: Columbia	1	9	80	7	10	9	1	37	11	23	WW: 200,000	GLF: Platinum; BPI: Gold
Ruins	Release date: 19 January 2018; Record label: Columbia	1	13	7	28	10	10	4	11	3	47		GLF: Gold; BPI: Silver
Palomino	Release date: 4 November 2022, deluxe edition 7 July 2023; Record label: Columbia	3	—	43	—	31	35	37	40	3	— (Note: Palomino did not enter the US Billboard 200, but peaked at number 25 on the Top Album Sales Chart.)		
"—" denotes a recording that did not chart or was not released in that territory.

=== Live albums ===
List of live albums, with selected chart positions
Title	Album details	Peak chart positions						
Title	Album details	SWE	AUT	BEL (FL)	GER	SCO	SWI	UK
Who by Fire	2017 Leonard Cohen tribute concert live; Release date: 26 March 2021; Record label: Sony Sweden/Columbia	2	24	55	31	12	30	62

=== EPs ===
List of EPs, with selected details
Title	Details
Drunken Trees	Release date: 9 April 2008; Record label: Wichita/Rabid
America	Release date: 28 November 2014 (vinyl) 13 January 2015 (digital); Record label: Columbia
Live from the Rebel Hearts Club	Release date: 8 June 2018 (digital); Record label: Columbia
Tender Offerings	Release date: 14 September 2018 (vinyl and digital); Record label: Columbia

=== Singles ===
List of singles, with selected chart positions and certifications
Title	Year	Peak chart positions										Certifications	Album
Title	Year	SWE	AUS	BEL (FL)	FRA	IRE	NLD	NOR	SWI	UK Sales	US AAA	Certifications	Album
"You're Not Coming Home Tonight" / "Tangerine"	2009	—	—	—	—	—	—	—	—	—	—		Drunken Trees (EP)
"Hard Believer" / "Waltz for Richard"	2009	—	—	—	—	—	—	—	—	—	—		The Big Black and the Blue
"I Met Up with the King"	2010	—	—	—	—	—	—	—	—	—	—		The Big Black and the Blue
"Ghost Town"	2010	—	—	—	—	—	—	—	—	— (Note: "Ghost Town" did not enter the UK Singles Chart, but peaked at number 90 on the UK Physical Singles Chart.)	—		The Big Black and the Blue
"Universal Soldier"	2011	—	—	—	—	—	—	—	—	—	—		Non-album single
"The Lion's Roar"	2011	22	—	—	—	—	—	—	—	— (Note: "The Lion's Roar" did not enter the UK Singles Chart, but peaked at number 29 on the UK Physical Singles Chart.)	—		The Lion's Roar
"Emmylou"	2012	24	—	— (Note: "Emmylou" did not enter the Flanders Ultratop 50, but peaked at 65 on the Flanders Ultratip chart.)	—	—	—	20	—	—	—	BPI: Silver	The Lion's Roar
"Blue"	2012	—	—	— (Note: "Blue" did not enter the Flanders Ultratop 50, but peaked at 55 on the Flanders Ultratip chart.)	—	—	—	—	—	—	—		The Lion's Roar
"Wolf"	2012	—	— (Note: "Wolf" did not enter the Australian ARIA Singles Chart but peaked at number 20 on the ARIA Hitseekers Chart.)	—	—	—	—	—	—	—	—		The Lion's Roar
"Play with Fire" (Øyacontainer Session)	2012	—	—	—	—	—	—	—	—	—	—		Non-album single
"My Silver Lining"	2014	38	76	7	19	77	50	—	38	31	22	BPI: Platinum	Stay Gold
"Cedar Lane"	2014	—	—	—	—	—	—	—	—	—	—		Stay Gold
"America"	2014	—	—	—	—	—	—	—	—	— (Note: "America" did not enter the UK Singles Chart, but peaked at number 23 on the UK Physical Singles Chart.)	—		America (EP)
"Stay Gold"	2015	—	—	—	—	—	—	—	—	—	26		Stay Gold
"Master Pretender"	2015	—	—	— (Note: "Master Pretender" did not enter the Flanders Ultratop 50, but peaked at 66 on the Flanders Ultratip chart.)	—	—	—	—	—	—	—		Stay Gold
"You Are the Problem Here"	2017	—	—	—	—	—	—	—	—	— (Note: "You Are the Problem Here" did not enter the UK Singles Chart, but peaked at number 16 on the UK Physical Singles Chart.)	—		Non-album singles
"Gloomy Sunday"	2017	—	—	—	—	—	—	—	—	—	—		Non-album singles
"Live From BBC Radio 2"	2017	—	—	—	—	—	—	—	—	—	—		Non-album singles
"It's a Shame"	2017	77	—	— (Note: "It's a Shame" did not enter the Flanders Ultratop 50, but peaked at 24 on the Flanders Ultratip chart.)	—	—	—	—	—	71	16		Ruins
"Fireworks"	2017	47	—	— (Note: "Fireworks" did not enter the Flanders Ultratop 50, but peaked at 19 on the Flanders Ultratip chart.)	—	—	—	—	—	71	—		Ruins
"Ruins"	2018	85	—	—	—	—	—	—	—	—	—		Ruins
"Fireworks" / "Running Up That Hill" (Spotify Singles)	2019	—	—	—	—	—	—	—	—	—	—		Non-album singles
"Strange Beauty" / "Random Rules"	2019	—	—	— (Note: "Strange Beauty" did not enter the Flanders Ultratop 50, but charted as an "extra tip" on the Flanders Ultratip chart.)	—	—	—	—	—	—	—		Non-album singles
"On the Road Again"	2020	—	—	—	—	—	—	—	—	—	—		Non-album singles
"Come Give Me Love" (Swedish & English versions)	2020	55	—	—	—	—	—	—	—	—	—		Non-album singles
"Suzanne" (live)	2021	—	—	— (Note: "Suzanne" did not enter the Flanders Ultratop 50, but charted as an "extra tip" on the Flanders Ultratip chart.)	—	—	—	—	—	—	—		Who by Fire
"Come Give Me Love" (Live at Benjamin's)	2022	—	—	—	—	—	—	—	—	—	—		Non-album singles
"Boys of Summer"	2022	—	—	—	—	—	—	—	—	—	—		Non-album singles
"Angel"	2022	—	—	—	—	—	—	—	—	44	—		Palomino
"Out of My Head"	2022	— (Note: "Out of My Head" did not enter the Swedish Singellista Chart, but peaked at number seven on the Swedish Heatseeker Chart.)	—	—	—	—	—	— (Note: "Out of My Head" did not enter the Norway Singles Chart, but peaked at number 23 on the Norway Radio Chart.)	—	48	38		Palomino
"Turning Onto You"	2022	—	—	—	—	—	—	—	—	—	—		Palomino
"A Feeling That Never Came"	2022	—	—	—	—	—	—	—	—	—	—		Palomino
"—" denotes a recording that did not chart or was not released in that territory.

=== Soundtracks ===
Year	Song	Film or TV	Reference
2014	"Frozen Lake" (only on the DVD of the film)	Min Så Kallade Pappa	
2014	"Walk Unafraid" (R.E.M. cover)	Wild	
2019	"Home Again"	Moominvalley (TV series)	
2020	"My Silver Lining"	Wanted (2016 Australian TV series) Umbrella Academy (season 3 epi 6)	
2021	"What You Need"	Centaurworld (episode only)	

=== Other charted and certified songs ===
Year	Song	Peak chart positions	Certifications	Album
Year	Song	SWE	Certifications	Album
2018	"To Live a Life"	64		Ruins
2018	"Rebel Heart"	65		Ruins
2018	"Distant Star"	82		Ruins
2018	"Postcard"	93		Ruins
2018	"My Wild Sweet Love"	— (Note: "My Wild Sweet Love" did not enter the Sverigetopplistan singles chart, but peaked at number four on the Sverigetopplistan Heatseeker chart.)		Ruins
2018	"Hem of Her Dress"	— (Note: "Hem of Her Dress" did not enter the Sverigetopplistan singles chart, but peaked at number eight on the Sverigetopplistan Heatseeker chart.)		Ruins
2018	"Nothing Has to Be True"	— (Note: "Nothing Has to Be True" did not enter the Sverigetopplistan singles chart, but peaked at number 12 on the Sverigetopplistan Heatseeker chart.)		Ruins
2018	"Saviour"; George Ezra featuring First Aid Kit	—	BPI: Silver	Staying at Tamara's

=== Other guest appearances ===
Year	Song	Artist	Album
2009	"Ten Seconds", "Armour", "Song No. 6" (as choir members)	Ane Brun	Live At Stockholm Concert Hall, CD+DVD
2009	"Summer Rain" (Acoustic DVD version)	Anna Ternheim	Leaving on a Mayday, 2CD+DVD box set
2011	"We're Going to Be Friends"	Bright Eyes	Cool for School: A Benefit for the Lunchbox Fund
2011	"Do You Remember"	Ane Brun	It All Starts with One
2012	"Godnatt"	Bröderna Lindgren	I Tiden
2012	"Glad That You Called", "Elbow In Your Face", "The Horoscope Song", "Numbers", "The Swimming", "When Will You Notice Me In The Crowd"	Blood Music	The Fire And The Flame
2014	"Time Forgot", "Hundreds of Ways", "Double Life", "Kick", "Night at Lake Unknown", "Governor's Ball"	Conor Oberst	Upside Down Mountain
2014	"The Voyager"	Jenny Lewis	The Voyager
2017	"Moving Slow", "Golden", "Little Less Blue"	Jesper Lindell	Little Less Blue (EP)
2017	"Du Fria"	Håkan Hellström	Du Fria (Rullande Åska Live) single
2018	"Revolution" (Released as single already in 2016)	Van William	Countries
2018	"Ether & Wood"	Alela Diane	Cusp
2018	"Goldwing"	Little Jinder	Hejdå
2021	"I Need Love"	Zara Larsson	Poster Girl (Summer Edition bonus track)
2021	"Hotel Amigo"	Thomas Stenström	Spring baby spring
2021	"Mama"	Maja Francis	A Pink Soft Mess
2021	"Isbergen", "Södra Korset"	Thåström	Dom som skiner
2022	"Cute & Cruel"	Tove Lo	Dirt Femme
2023	"Kids In Love"	Pink	Trustfall
2023	"Too Young To Die", "Engine 5"	M. Ward	Supernatural Thing
2023	"All My Exes Live in L.A."	Lola Kirke	Country Curious

=== Music videos ===
Year	Video
2009	"Hard Believer"
2010	"Ghost Town"
2011	"The Lion's Roar"
2012	"Emmylou"
2012	"Blue"
2012	"Wolf"
2014	"My Silver Lining"
2014	"Cedar Lane"
2014	"America"
2014	"Walk Unafraid"
2015	"Stay Gold"
2017	"It's a Shame"
2017	"Fireworks"
2018	"Rebel Heart"
2020	"On the Road Again"
2020	"Come Give Me Love"
2022	"Angel"
2022	"Out of My Head"
2022	"Turning Onto You"
2022	"A Feeling That Never Came"
2022	"Palomino"
2023	"Everybody's Got to Learn" (lyric video)
