= The Lion's Roar (song) =

Single by First Aid Kit

from the album The Lion's Roar
- Released: 11 November 2011; 27 January 2012 (Sweden)
- Recorded: 2011
- Genre: Folk
- Length: 3:55 (radio edit); 5:07 (album version)
- Label: Wichita Recordings
- Songwriters: Klara Söderberg; Johanna Söderberg
- Producer: Mike Mogis

First Aid Kit singles chronology
"Universal Soldier" (2011)	"The Lion's Roar" (2011)	"Emmylou" (2012)

"The Lion's Roar" is the title track of the album The Lion's Roar by the Swedish folk band First Aid Kit. Written by Klara Söderberg and Johanna Söderberg, the song was released as the first single from the album and entered the Swedish Singles Chart at #38, and then rose to #34 the following week.

== Charts ==
Chart (2012)	Peak position
Swedish Singles Chart	22

== Usage in media ==
The game The Long Dark features the song as the introduction sequence to episodes 2, 3 and 4 of the story mode.

The song is heard during the end credits of episode 5, season 2 of the show Mythic Quest.
