= Emmylou (song) =

Single by First Aid Kit

from the album The Lion's Roar
- Released: 16 January 2012
- Recorded: 2011
- Genre: Country
- Length: 4:18
- Label: Wichita Recordings
- Songwriters: Klara Söderberg; Johanna Söderberg
- Producer: Mike Mogis

First Aid Kit singles chronology
"The Lion's Roar" (2011)	"Emmylou" (2012)	"Blue" (2012)

"Emmylou" is a single by the Swedish folk band First Aid Kit from their second studio album The Lion's Roar. Written by sisters Klara Söderberg and Johanna Söderberg, the song was released on 16 January 2012 as the second single from the album. "Emmylou" entered the Swedish Singles Chart at #33, and peaked at #24.

== Composition ==
The song is named after American country singer Emmylou Harris and discusses her relationship with her musical partner Gram Parsons and compares it to the relationship between Johnny and June Carter Cash. When discussing the writing of the song, the band explained "when we were 14 and 16, we discovered the music of Emmylou Harris and Gram Parsons. We were so inspired that we wrote this song, which is about the joy and magic of singing together with someone that you love".

== Live performances ==
To promote the song in America, the band performed on Conan in April 2012 and Late Show with David Letterman in October 2012.

On 9 June 2015, First Aid Kit performed the song in front of Harris, who became visibly emotional, at the laureates dinner when she received the Polar Music Prize. Of this, the band stated "We never, never thought we’d play this in front of you, Emmylou, it’s an incredible honor". They later covered Harris' "Red Dirt Girl" at the ceremony itself.

== Charts ==
Chart (2012)	Peak position
Belgium Ultratop	65
Norway Singles Chart	20
Swedish Singles Chart	24

== Certifications ==
Region	Certification	Certified units/sales
United Kingdom (BPI)	Silver	200,000^{‡}
^{‡} Sales+streaming figures based on certification alone.

== Reception ==
Rolling Stone named "Emmylou" the 10th best song of 2012 and as number 96 on their 100 best songs of the 2010s list.

== Cover versions ==
The song was covered by bluegrass husband and wife duo Darin and Brooke Alrdidge for their 2019 album Inner Journey. In an interview with American Songwriter, Brooke explained: "we have the utmost respect for Emmylou and Gram, as well as Johnny and June – not only as musical artists but as couples too. When we discovered [First Aid Kit’s] song ‘Emmylou,’ it was a pleasant surprise. After listening and learning it was a tribute to the great Emmylou Harris, the words took on a whole new meaning. It’s the perfect invitation to romance and spoke to us on a very personal level as a couple. [‘Emmylou’] is such an inspiring song that basically reminds its listener that ‘true love’ never dies. Darin and I set out to represent that very message when we first started on our musical journey and hope to always make that the foundation of our music".
