= Flora Recording & Playback =

Recording studio in Portland, Oregon

Coordinates: 45.53795°N 122.67195°W

- Founded: 2011
- Headquarters: Portland, Oregon, U.S.
- Services: Recording studio
- Owner: Tucker Martine
- Website: www.florarecording.com

Flora Recording & Playback is a recording studio located in Portland, Oregon operated by Grammy-nominated record producer Tucker Martine.

== History ==
Flora Recording & Playback is the studio of Grammy Nominated producer/engineer/musician Tucker Martine. Housed in a former motorcycle club clubhouse, it's a 2500 square foot building in Northeast Portland, Oregon. The studio features a live room, a designed control room, four isolation rooms of various sizes all with sight lines to one another, a reverb chamber, floating floors, acoustics, much natural light and an gear list.

Outside producers that have chosen to work at Flora include T-Bone Burnett, Danger Mouse and John McEntire.

Artists that have recorded at Flora include:

- The Decemberists
- R.E.M.
- My Morning Jacket
- Modest Mouse
- Broken Bells
- Beth Orton
- Neko Case
- First Aid Kit
- Bill Frisell
- Sufjan Stevens
- Spoon, Grandaddy
- Mavis Staples
- Courtney Barnett
- Iron and Wine
- Gary Larson
- The Jayhawks
- Karl Blau
- Edward Sharpe and the Magnetic Zeros
- Blind Pilot
- Camera Obscura
- Robin Pecknold (Fleet Foxes)
- Stephen Malkmus (Pavement)
- K.d. lang
- She and Him
- M Ward
- Mt.Joy
- Case/lang/veirs
- Jesse Sykes
- Karl Blau
- Laura Veirs
