= The Beatles =

English rock band (1960–1970)

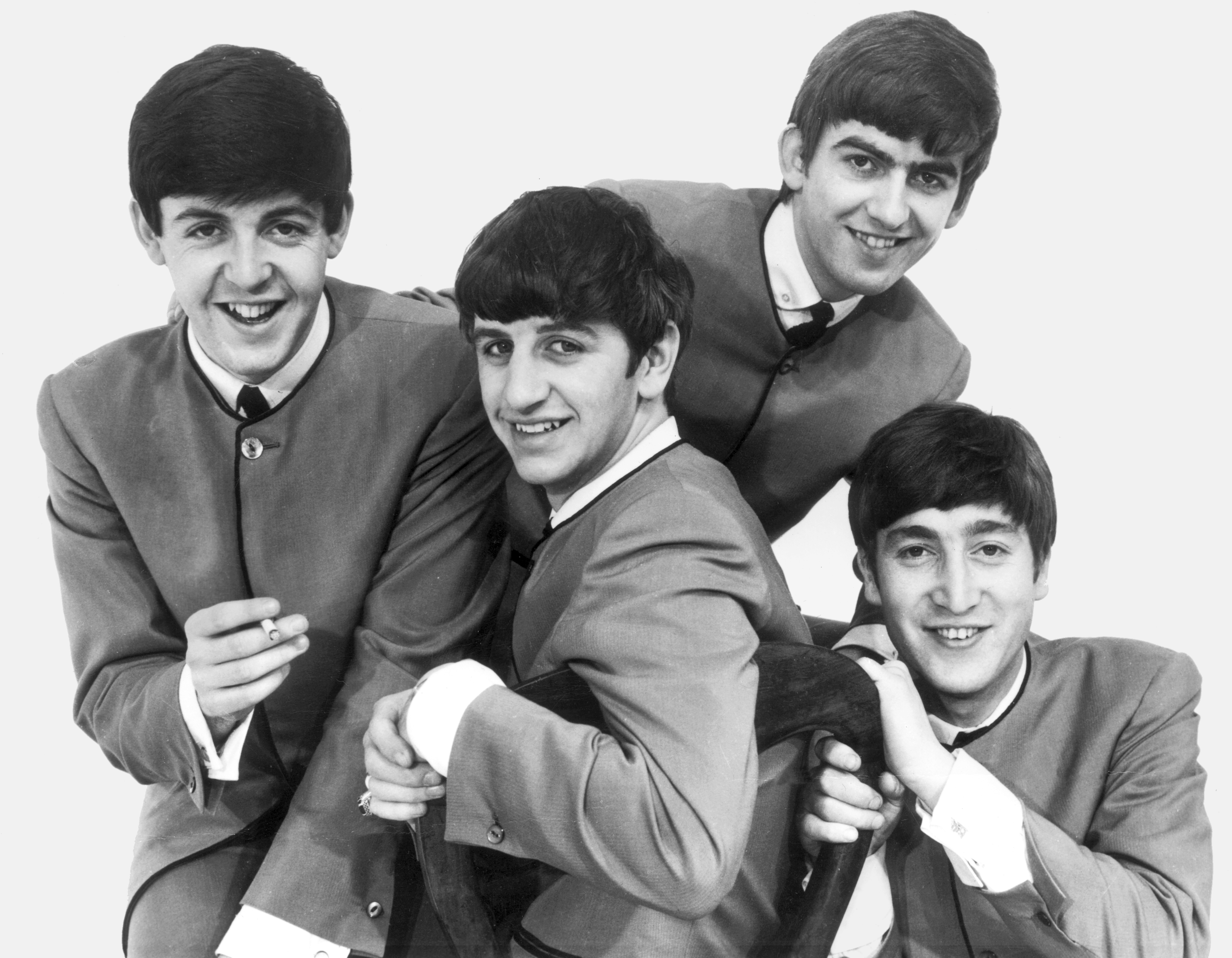
- The Beatles in 1963; From left: Paul McCartney, Ringo Starr, George Harrison and John Lennon

Background information
- Origin: Liverpool, England
- Genres: Rock; pop; beat; psychedelia
- Works: Albums; singles; songs; covers; film; recording sessions; performances
- Years active: 1960–1970
- Labels: Polydor; Parlophone; Tollie; Vee-Jay; Capitol; Swan; Odeon; MGM; Atco; United Artists; Apple
- Spinoff of: The Quarrymen
- Awards: Full list
- Past members: John Lennon; Paul McCartney; George Harrison; Ringo Starr; (see § Members for others)
- Website: thebeatles.com

The Beatles were an English rock band formed in Liverpool in 1960. The band comprised John Lennon, Paul McCartney, George Harrison and Ringo Starr. They are regarded as the most influential band in popular music and were integral to the development of 1960s counterculture and the recognition of popular music as an art form. Rooted in skiffle, beat and 1950s rock 'n' roll, their sound incorporated elements of classical music and traditional pop in innovative ways. They also explored styles ranging from folk and Indian music to psychedelia and hard rock. As pioneers in recording, songwriting and artistic presentation, the Beatles revolutionised many aspects of the music industry and were often portrayed as leaders of the era's youth and sociocultural movements.

Led by primary songwriters Lennon and McCartney, the Beatles evolved from Lennon's previous group, the Quarrymen, and built their reputation by playing clubs in Liverpool and Hamburg, West Germany, starting in 1960. Lennon, McCartney and Harrison, together since 1958, went through a succession of drummers before Starr officially joined in 1962. Manager Brian Epstein moulded them into a professional act, and producer George Martin developed their recordings, greatly expanding their domestic success after they signed with EMI and achieved their first hit, "Love Me Do", in late 1962. As their popularity grew into the fan frenzy dubbed "Beatlemania", the band acquired the nickname "the Fab Four". By early 1964, the Beatles were international stars and had achieved unprecedented levels of critical and commercial success. They became a leading force in Britain's cultural resurgence, ushering in the British Invasion of the United States pop market. Their film debut, A Hard Day's Night (1964), was followed by Help! (1965).

A growing desire to refine their studio efforts, coupled with the challenging nature of their concert tours, led to the Beatles' retirement from live performances in 1966. During this time, they produced albums of greater sophistication: Rubber Soul (1965), Revolver (1966) and Sgt. Pepper's Lonely Hearts Club Band (1967). They enjoyed further success with The Beatles ("the White Album", 1968) and Abbey Road (1969). The success of these records heralded the album era, increased public interest in psychedelic drugs and Eastern spirituality, and furthered advancements in electronic music, album art and music videos. In 1968, the Beatles founded Apple Corps, a multi-armed multimedia corporation that continues to oversee projects related to their legacy. After the Beatles' break-up in 1970, all former members enjoyed success as solo artists. While some partial reunions occurred over the next decade, the members never fully reunited. Lennon was murdered in 1980 and Harrison died of lung cancer in 2001; McCartney and Starr remain musically active.

The Beatles are the best-selling music act of all time, with estimated sales of over 600 million units worldwide. They are the most successful act in the history of the US Billboard charts, with the most number-one singles on the Billboard Hot 100 (20) and the most number-one albums on the Billboard 200 (19). They hold the record for most singles sold in the UK (21.9 million), and held the record for most number-one albums on the UK Albums Chart (15) until Robbie Williams surpassed them in 2026. The Beatles' accolades include nine Grammy Awards, four Brit Awards, an Academy Award (for Best Original Song Score for the 1970 documentary film Let It Be) and fifteen Ivor Novello Awards. They were inducted into the Rock and Roll Hall of Fame in their first year of eligibility, 1988, and each principal member was individually inducted between 1994 and 2015. In 2004 and 2011, the Beatles topped Rolling Stone's list of 100 Greatest Artists. Time named them among the 20th century's 100 most important people.

== History ==
=== 1956–1963: Formation ===
==== The Quarrymen and name changes ====
In November 1956, 16-year-old John Lennon formed a skiffle group with several friends from Quarry Bank High School for Boys in Liverpool. They were called the Quarrymen, a reference to their school song "Quarry men old before our birth". Fifteen-year-old Paul McCartney met Lennon on 6 July 1957 and impressed him with his performance of Eddie Cochran's "Twenty Flight Rock". McCartney joined as a rhythm guitarist shortly after. In February 1958, McCartney invited his friend George Harrison, then aged 15, to watch the band. Harrison auditioned for Lennon, impressing him with his playing, but Lennon initially thought Harrison was too young. After a month's persistence, during a second meeting (arranged by McCartney), Harrison performed the lead guitar part of the instrumental "Raunchy" on the upper deck of a Liverpool bus, and they enlisted him as lead guitarist.

By January 1959, Lennon's Quarry Bank friends had left the group, and he had begun his studies at the Liverpool College of Art. The three guitarists, billing themselves as Johnny and the Moondogs, were playing rock and roll whenever they could find a drummer. They also performed as the Rainbows; McCartney later told New Musical Express that they chose the name "because we all had different coloured shirts and we couldn't afford any others!"

Lennon's art school friend Stuart Sutcliffe, who had just sold one of his paintings and was persuaded to purchase a bass guitar with the proceeds, joined in January 1960. He suggested changing the band's name to Beatals, as a tribute to Buddy Holly and the Crickets. They used this name until May, when they became the Silver Beetles, before undertaking a brief tour of Scotland as the backing group for pop singer and fellow Liverpudlian Johnny Gentle. By early July, they had refashioned themselves as the Silver Beatles, and by mid-August simply the Beatles.

==== Early residencies and UK popularity ====
Left to right: Pete Best, George Harrison, John Lennon, Paul McCartney and Stuart Sutcliffe at the Hamburg Funfair in 1960, photographed by Astrid Kirchherr. Sutcliffe left the Beatles in 1961 and Ringo Starr replaced Best in 1962.

Allan Williams, the Beatles' unofficial manager, arranged a residency for them in Hamburg. They auditioned and hired drummer Pete Best in mid-August 1960. The band, now a five-piece, departed Liverpool for Hamburg four days later, contracted to club owner Bruno Koschmider for what would be a 3 1/2-month residency. Beatles historian Mark Lewisohn writes: "They pulled into Hamburg at dusk on 17 August, the time when the red-light area comes to life ... flashing neon lights screamed out the various entertainment on offer, while scantily clad women sat unabashed in shop windows waiting for business opportunities."

Koschmider had converted two strip clubs in the red-light Reeperbahn district of St. Pauli into music venues and placed the Beatles at the Indra Club. After closing Indra due to noise complaints, he moved them to the Kaiserkeller in October. When he learned they had been performing at the rival Top Ten Club in breach of their contract, he gave them one month's termination notice, and reported the underage Harrison, who had obtained permission to stay in Hamburg by lying to the German authorities about his age. The authorities arranged for Harrison's deportation in late November. One week later, Koschmider had McCartney and Best arrested for arson after they set fire to a condom in a concrete corridor; the authorities deported them. Lennon returned to Liverpool in early December, while Sutcliffe remained in Hamburg until late February with his German fiancée Astrid Kirchherr, who took the first semi-professional photos of the Beatles.

During the next two years, the Beatles were resident for periods in Hamburg, where they used Preludin both recreationally and to maintain their energy through all-night performances. In 1961, during their second Hamburg engagement, Kirchherr cut Sutcliffe's hair in the "exi" (existentialist) style, later adopted by the other Beatles. Sutcliffe decided to leave the band at the end of that residency to resume his art studies in Germany, and McCartney took over bass. Producer Bert Kaempfert contracted what was now a four-piece group until June 1962, and he used them as Tony Sheridan's backing band on a series of recordings for Polydor Records. As part of the sessions, the Beatles were signed to Polydor for one year. Credited to "Tony Sheridan & the Beat Brothers", the single "My Bonnie", recorded in June 1961 and released four months later, reached number 32 on the Musikmarkt chart.

After the Beatles completed their second Hamburg residency, they enjoyed increasing popularity in Liverpool with the growing Merseybeat movement. However, they were growing tired of the monotony of numerous appearances at the same clubs night after night. In November 1961, during one of the group's frequent performances at the Cavern Club, they encountered Brian Epstein, a local record-store owner and music columnist. He recalled: "I immediately liked what I heard. They were fresh, and they were honest, and they had what I thought was a sort of presence ... [a] star quality."

==== First EMI recordings ====
Epstein courted the band over the next couple of months, and they appointed him as their manager in January 1962. Epstein began negotiations with record labels for a recording contract. After a New Year's Day audition, Decca Records rejected the band, saying, "Guitar groups are on the way out, Mr. Epstein." However, three months later, producer George Martin signed the Beatles to EMI's Parlophone label.

Throughout early and mid-1962, to secure a UK record contract, Epstein sought to free the Beatles from their contractual obligations to Polydor and Bert Kaempfert Productions. He eventually negotiated a one-month early release in exchange for one last recording session in Hamburg backing Tony Sheridan. On their return to Germany in April, a distraught Kirchherr met them at the airport with news of Sutcliffe's death the previous day from a brain haemorrhage.

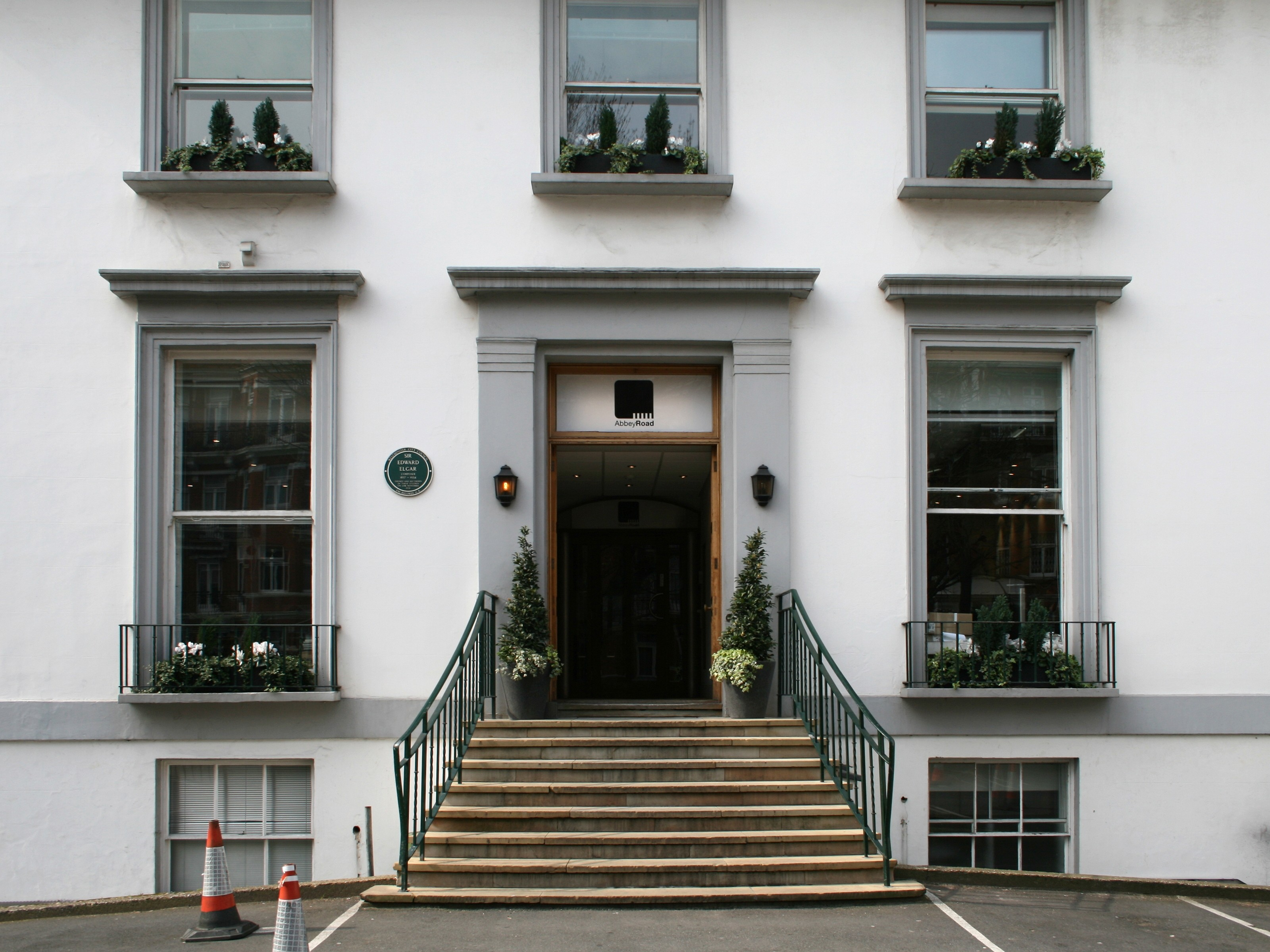
Main entrance at EMI Recording Studios (now Abbey Road Studios, pictured in 2007)

Martin's first recording session with the Beatles took place at EMI Recording Studios (later Abbey Road Studios) in London on 6 June 1962. He immediately complained to Epstein about Best's drumming and suggested they use a session drummer in his place. Already contemplating Best's dismissal, the Beatles replaced him in mid-August with Ringo Starr, who left Rory Storm and the Hurricanes to join them. A 4 September session at EMI yielded a recording of "Love Me Do" featuring Starr on drums, but a dissatisfied Martin hired drummer Andy White for the band's third session a week later.

Martin initially selected the Starr version of "Love Me Do" for the band's first single, though subsequent re-pressings featured the White version, with Starr on tambourine. Released in early October, "Love Me Do" peaked at number 17 on the Record Retailer chart. Their television debut came later that month with a live performance on the regional news programme People and Places. After Martin suggested re-recording "Please Please Me" at a faster tempo, a studio session in late November yielded that recording, of which Martin accurately predicted, "You've just made your first No. 1".

In December 1962, the Beatles concluded their fifth and final Hamburg residency at the Star-Club. By 1963, they had agreed that all four band members would contribute vocals to their albums – including Starr, despite his restricted vocal range, to validate his standing in the group. Lennon and McCartney had established a songwriting partnership, and as the band's success grew, their dominant collaboration limited Harrison's opportunities as a lead vocalist. Epstein, to maximise the Beatles' commercial potential, encouraged them to adopt a professional approach to performing. Lennon recalled him saying, "Look, if you really want to get in these bigger places, you're going to have to change – stop eating on stage, stop swearing, stop smoking ..." (Note: Lennon said of Epstein, "We used to dress how we liked, on and off stage. He'd tell us that jeans were not particularly smart and could we possibly manage to wear proper trousers, but he didn't want us suddenly looking square. He'd let us have our own sense of individuality.")

=== 1963–1966: Beatlemania and touring years ===
==== Please Please Me and With the Beatles ====
The band's logo was designed by Ivor Arbiter.

On 11 February 1963, the Beatles recorded ten songs during a single studio session for their debut LP, Please Please Me. It was supplemented by the four tracks already released on their first two singles. Martin considered recording the LP live at the Cavern Club, but after deciding that the building's acoustics were inadequate, he elected to simulate a "live" album with minimal production in "a single marathon session at Abbey Road". After the moderate success of "Love Me Do", the single "Please Please Me" was released in January 1963, two months ahead of the album. It reached number one on every UK chart except Record Retailer, where it peaked at number two.

Recalling how the Beatles "rushed to deliver a debut album, bashing out Please Please Me in a day", Stephen Thomas Erlewine wrote: "Decades after its release, the album still sounds fresh, precisely because of its intense origins." Lennon said little thought went into composition at the time; he and McCartney were "just writing songs à la Everly Brothers, à la Buddy Holly, pop songs with no more thought of them than that – to create a sound. And the words were almost irrelevant."

"She Loves You"
Sample of "She Loves You". The song's repeated use of "yeah" exclamations became a signature phrase for the group at the time.

Released in March 1963, Please Please Me was the first of eleven consecutive Beatles albums issued in the United Kingdom to reach number one. The band's third single, "From Me to You", came out in April and began an almost unbroken string of seventeen British number-one singles, including all but one of the eighteen they released over the next six years. Issued in August, their fourth single, "She Loves You", achieved the fastest sales of any record in the UK up to that time, selling three-quarters of a million copies in under four weeks. It became their first single to sell a million copies and remained the biggest-selling record in the UK until 1978. (Note: "She Loves You" was surpassed in sales by "Mull of Kintyre", by McCartney's post-Beatles band Wings.)

The success brought increased media exposure, to which the Beatles responded with an irreverent and comical attitude that defied the expectations of pop musicians at the time, inspiring even more interest. The band toured the UK three times in the first half of the year: a four-week tour that began in February, the Beatles' first nationwide, preceded three-week tours in March and May–June. As their popularity spread, a frenzied adulation of the group took hold. On 13 October, the Beatles starred on Sunday Night at the London Palladium, the UK's top variety show. Their performance was televised live and watched by 15 million viewers. One national paper's headlines in the following days coined the term "Beatlemania" to describe the riotous enthusiasm by screaming fans who greeted the band – and it stuck. Although not billed as tour leaders, the Beatles overshadowed American acts Tommy Roe and Chris Montez during the February engagements and assumed top billing "by audience demand", something no British act had previously accomplished while touring with artists from the US. A similar situation arose during their May–June tour with Roy Orbison.

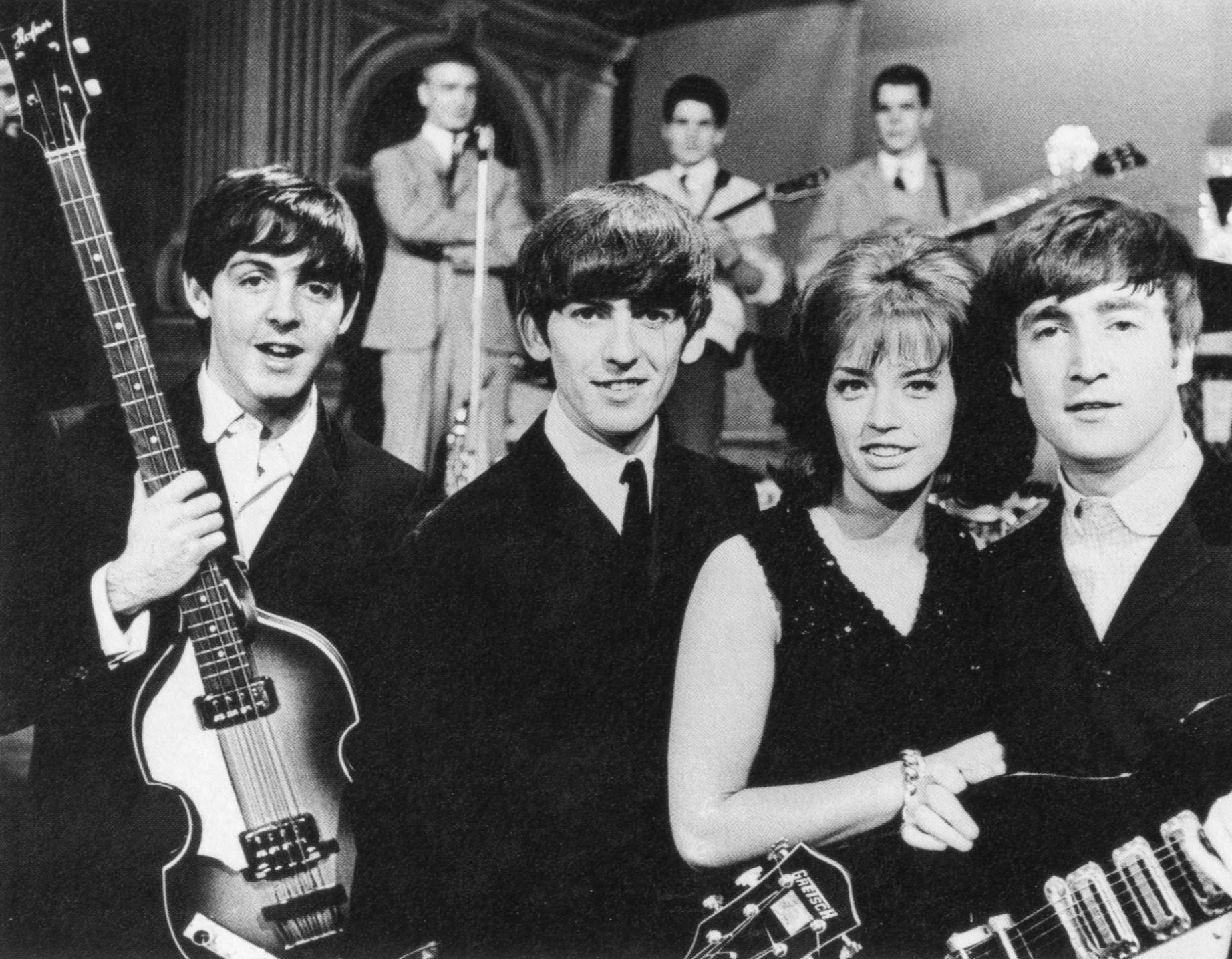
McCartney, Harrison, Swedish pop singer Lill-Babs and Lennon on the set of the Swedish television show Drop-In, 30 October 1963

In late October, the Beatles began a five-day tour of Sweden, their first time abroad since the final Hamburg engagement of December 1962. On their return to the UK on 31 October, several hundred screaming fans greeted them in heavy rain at Heathrow Airport. Around 50 to 100 journalists and photographers, as well as representatives from the BBC, also joined the airport reception, the first of more than 100 such events. The next day, the band began its fourth tour of Britain within nine months, this one scheduled for six weeks. In mid-November, as Beatlemania intensified, police resorted to using high-pressure water hoses to control the crowd before a concert in Plymouth. On 4 November, they played in front of The Queen Mother and Princess Margaret during the Royal Variety Performance at the Prince of Wales Theatre.

Please Please Me maintained the top position on the Record Retailer chart for 30 weeks, only to be displaced by its follow-up, With the Beatles, which EMI released on 22 November to record advance orders of 270,000 copies. The LP sold more than half a million copies in one week. Recorded between July and October, With the Beatles made better use of studio production techniques than its predecessor. It held the top spot for 21 weeks with a chart life of 40 weeks. Erlewine described the LP as "a sequel of the highest order – one that betters the original".

In a reversal of then-standard practice, EMI released the album ahead of the impending single "I Want to Hold Your Hand", with the song excluded to maximise the single's sales. The album caught the attention of music critic William Mann of The Times, who suggested that Lennon and McCartney were "the outstanding English composers of 1963". The newspaper published a series of articles in which Mann offered detailed analyses of the music, lending it respectability. With the Beatles became the second album in UK chart history to sell a million copies, a figure previously reached only by the 1958 South Pacific soundtrack. When writing the sleeve notes for the album, the band's press officer, Tony Barrow, used the sobriquet "the fabulous foursome", which Terry Southern adapted as "the Fab Four".

==== First visit to the United States and the British Invasion ====
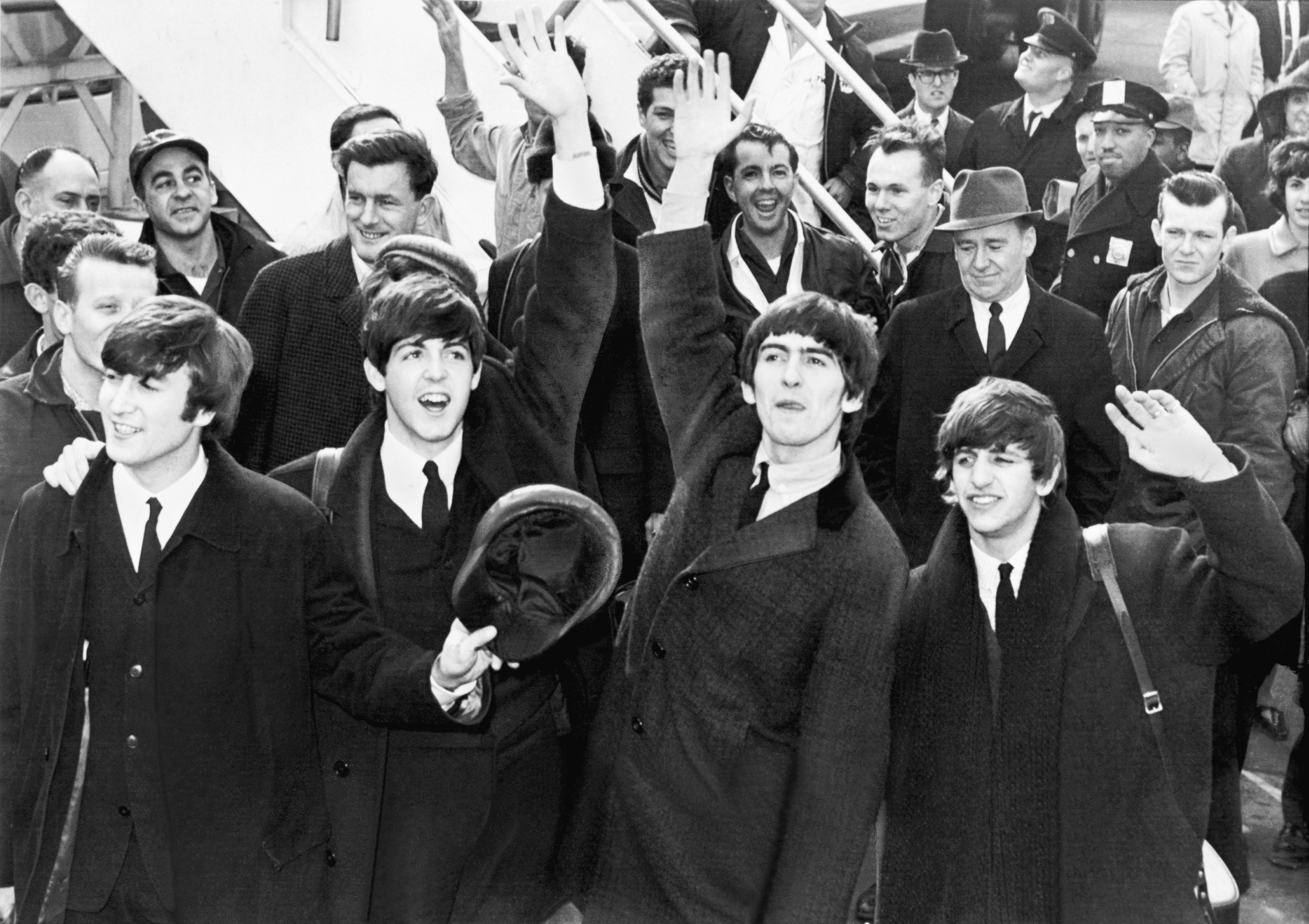
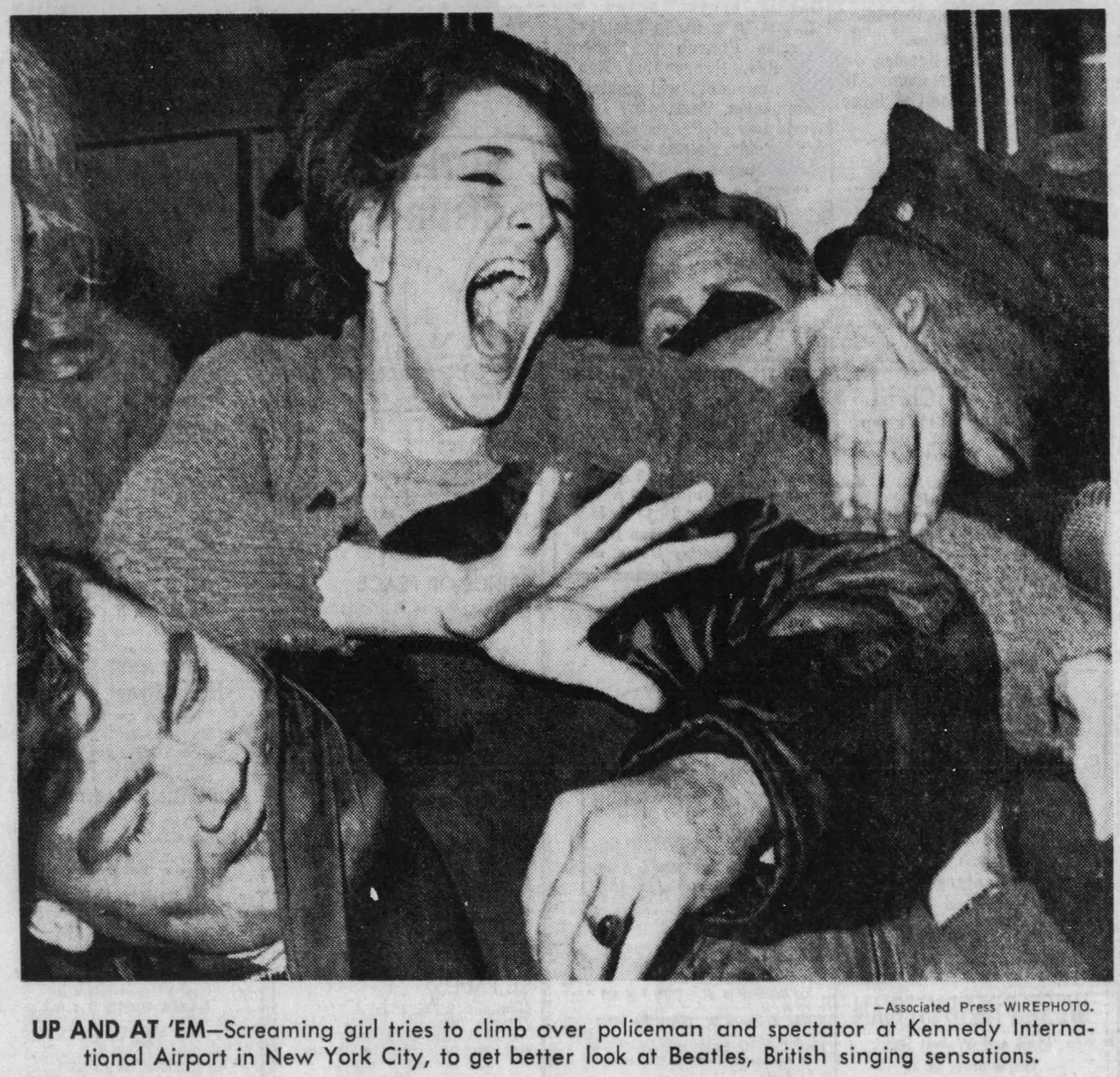
The Beatles arriving at John F. Kennedy International Airport, 7 February 1964 (left), and a newspaper clipping from 8 February 1964 covering "Beatlemania" (right)

EMI's American subsidiary, Capitol Records, hindered the Beatles' releases in the United States for more than a year by initially declining to issue their music, including their first three singles. Concurrent negotiations with the independent US label Vee-Jay led to the release of some, but not all, of the songs in 1963. Vee-Jay finished preparation for the album Introducing... The Beatles, comprising most of the songs of Parlophone's Please Please Me, but a management shake-up led to the album not being released. (Note: Vee-Jay company president Ewart Abner resigned after it was disclosed he used company funds to cover gambling debts.) After it emerged that the label did not report royalties on their sales, the licence that Vee-Jay had signed with EMI was voided. A new licence was granted to the Swan label for the single "She Loves You". The record received some airplay in the Tidewater area of Virginia from Gene Loving of radio station WGH and was featured on the "Rate-a-Record" segment of American Bandstand, but it failed to catch on nationally.

Epstein brought a demo copy of "I Want to Hold Your Hand" to Capitol's Brown Meggs, who signed the band and arranged for a $40,000 US marketing campaign. American chart success began after disc jockey Carroll James of AM radio station WWDC, in Washington, DC, obtained a copy of the British single "I Want to Hold Your Hand" in mid-December 1963 and began playing it on-air. Taped copies of the song soon circulated among other radio stations throughout the US. This caused an increase in demand, leading Capitol to bring forward the release of "I Want to Hold Your Hand" by three weeks. Issued on 26 December, with the band's previously scheduled debut there just weeks away, "I Want to Hold Your Hand" sold a million copies, becoming a number-one hit in the US by mid-January. In its wake Vee-Jay released Introducing... The Beatles along with Capitol's debut album, Meet the Beatles!, while Swan reactivated production of "She Loves You". The Odeon label, an EMI subsidiary, pressed Beatles LPs to be shipped out and distributed abroad. Shortly before the Beatles' US arrival, MGM Records released "My Bonnie" backed with "The Saints" as a Beatles single in the US on 27 January 1964, and Atco followed in issuing the recordings the Beatles had made in Germany with Tony Sheridan in 1961 and 1962.

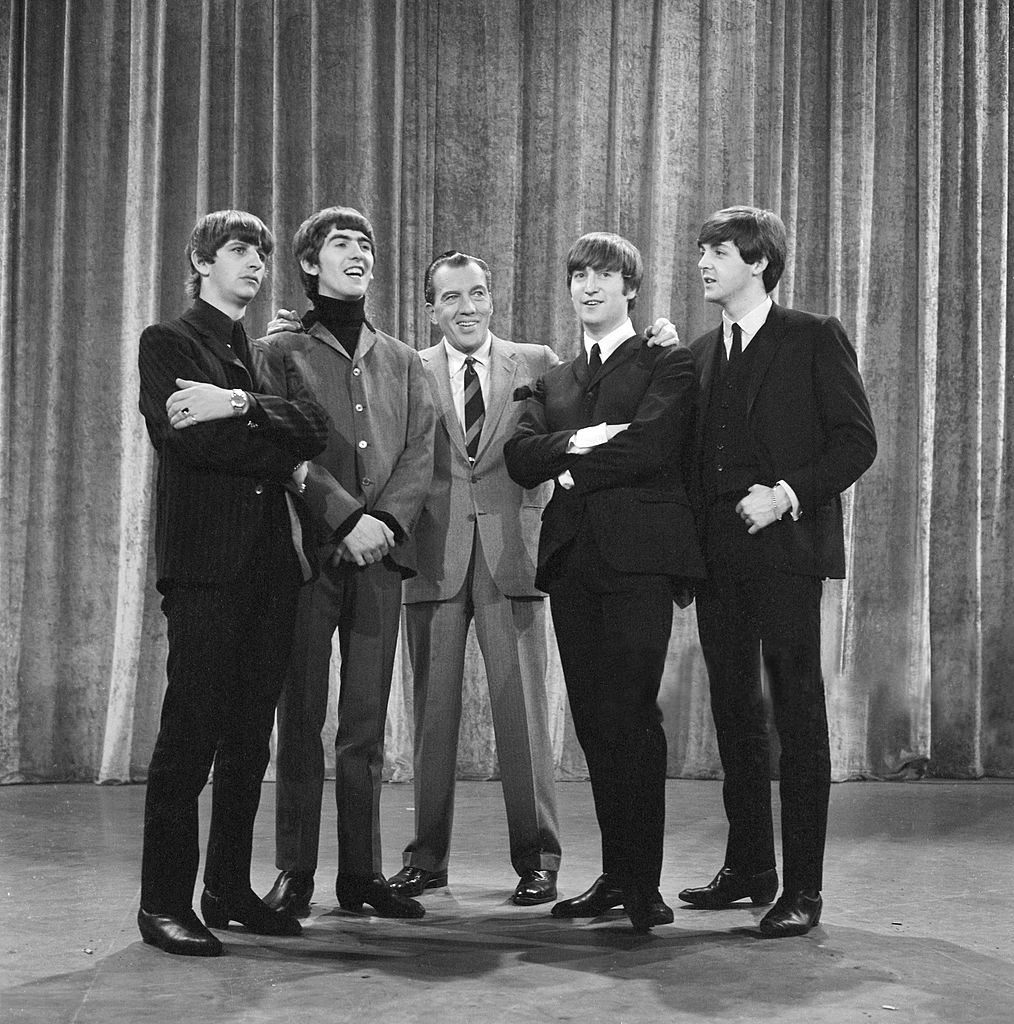
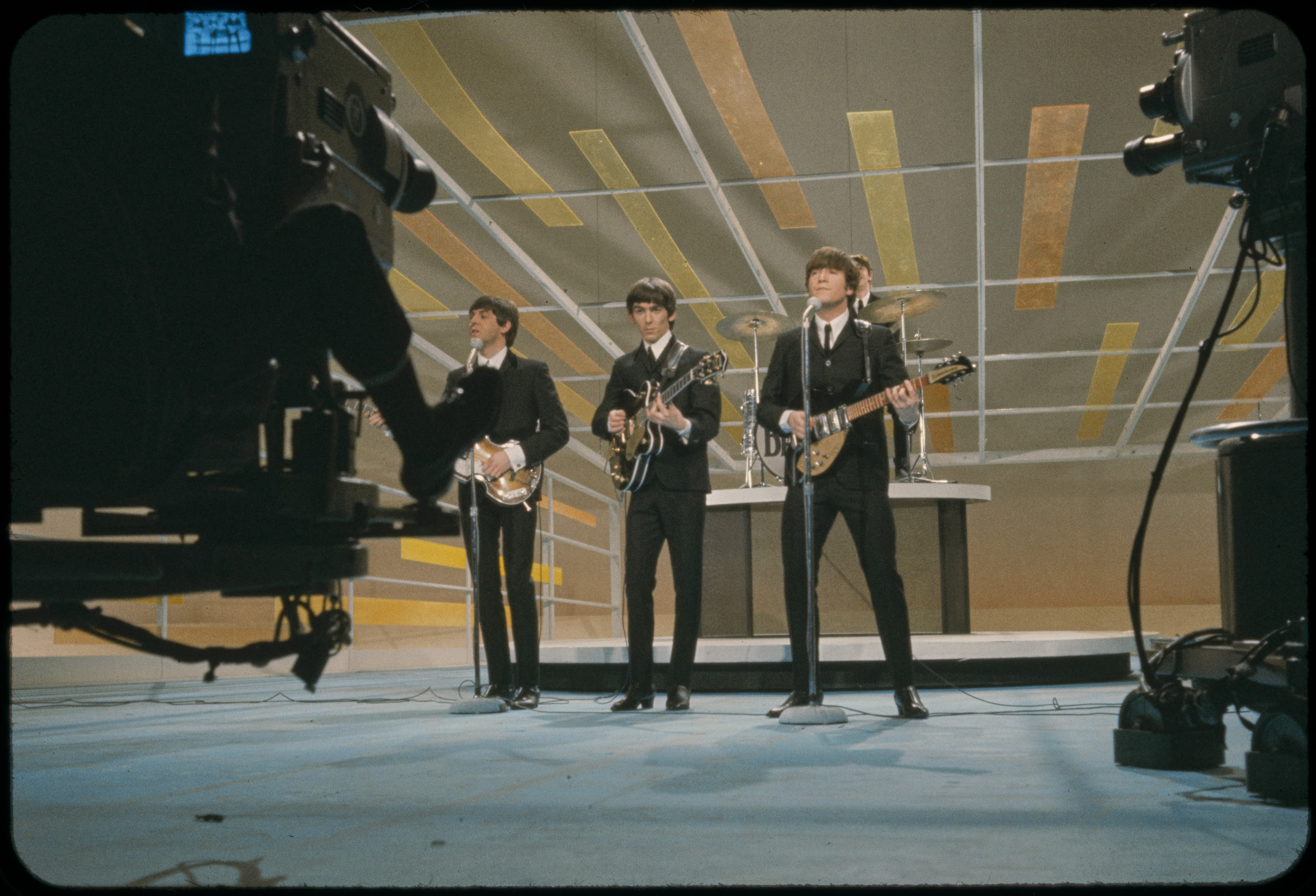
The Beatles performing on The Ed Sullivan Show, February 1964

On 7 February 1964, the Beatles departed from Heathrow with an estimated 4,000 fans waving and screaming as the aircraft took off. Upon landing at New York's John F. Kennedy International Airport, they were greeted by an uproarious crowd estimated at 3,000. They gave their first live US television performance two days later on The Ed Sullivan Show, watched by approximately 73 million viewers in over 23 million households, or 34% of the American population. Biographer Jonathan Gould writes that, according to the Nielsen rating service, it was "the largest audience that had ever been recorded for an American television program". The next morning, the Beatles awoke to a largely negative critical consensus in the US, but a day later at their first US concert, Beatlemania erupted at the Washington Coliseum. Back in New York the following day, the Beatles met with another strong reception during two shows at Carnegie Hall. The band then flew to Florida, where they appeared on The Ed Sullivan Show a second time, again before 70 million viewers, before returning to the UK on 22 February.

The Beatles' first visit to the US took place when the nation was still mourning the assassination of President John F. Kennedy the previous November. Commentators often suggest that for many, particularly the young, the Beatles' performances reignited the sense of excitement and possibility that had momentarily faded in the wake of the assassination and helped pave the way for the revolutionary social changes to come later in the decade. Their hairstyles, unusually long for the era and mocked by many adults, became an emblem of rebellion to the burgeoning youth culture.

The group's popularity generated unprecedented interest in British music, and many other UK acts subsequently made their American debuts, successfully touring over the next three years in what was termed the British Invasion. The Beatles' success in the US opened the door for a successive string of British beat groups and pop acts such as the Dave Clark Five, the Animals, Herman's Hermits, Petula Clark, the Kinks and the Rolling Stones to achieve success in America. During the week of 4 April 1964, the Beatles held twelve positions on the Billboard Hot 100 singles chart, including the top five. (Note: During the same week in April 1964, a third American Beatles LP joined the two already in circulation; two of the three reached the first spot on the Billboard albums chart, the third peaked at number two.)

==== A Hard Day's Night ====
Capitol Records' lack of interest throughout 1963 did not go unnoticed, and a competitor, United Artists Records, encouraged its film division to offer the Beatles a three-motion-picture deal, primarily for the commercial potential of the soundtracks in the US. Directed by Richard Lester, A Hard Day's Night involved the band for six weeks in March–April 1964 as they played themselves in a musical comedy. The film premiered in London and New York in July and August, respectively, and was an international success, with some critics drawing a comparison with the Marx Brothers.

United Artists released a full soundtrack album for the North American market, combining Beatles songs and Martin's orchestral score; elsewhere, the group's third studio LP, A Hard Day's Night, contained songs from the film on side one and other new recordings on side two. According to Erlewine, the album saw them "truly coming into their own as a band. All of the disparate influences on their first two albums coalesced into a bright, joyous, original sound, filled with ringing guitars and irresistible melodies." That "ringing guitar" sound was primarily the product of Harrison's 12-string electric Rickenbacker, a prototype given to him by the manufacturer, which made its debut on the record. (Note: Harrison's ringing 12-string inspired Roger McGuinn, who obtained his own Rickenbacker and used it to craft the trademark sound of the Byrds.)

==== 1964 world tour, meeting Bob Dylan and stand on civil rights ====
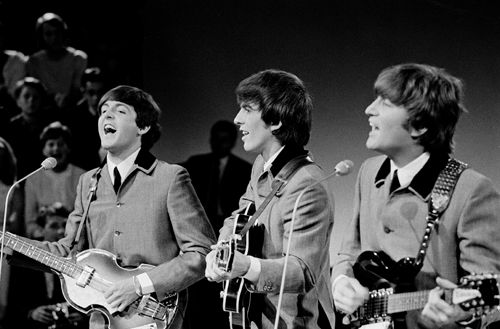
McCartney, Harrison and Lennon performing on Dutch TV in 1964

Touring internationally in June and July, the Beatles staged 37 shows over 27 days in Denmark, the Netherlands, Hong Kong, Australia and New Zealand. (Note: Starr was briefly hospitalised after a tonsillectomy, and Jimmie Nicol sat in on drums for the first five dates.) In August and September, they returned to the US, with a 30-concert tour of 23 cities. Generating intense interest once again, the month-long tour attracted between 10,000 and 20,000 people to each 30-minute performance in cities from New York to San Francisco.

In August, journalist Al Aronowitz arranged for the Beatles to meet Bob Dylan. Visiting the band in their New York hotel suite, Dylan introduced them to cannabis. Gould points out the musical and cultural significance of this meeting, before which the musicians' respective fan bases were "perceived as inhabiting two separate subcultural worlds": Dylan's audience of "college kids with artistic or intellectual leanings, a dawning political and social idealism, and a mildly bohemian style" contrasted with their fans, "veritable 'teenyboppers' – kids in high school or grade school whose lives were totally wrapped up in the commercialised popular culture of television, radio, pop records, fan magazines and teen fashion. To many of Dylan's followers in the folk music scene, the Beatles were seen as idolaters, not idealists."

Within six months of the meeting, according to Gould, "Lennon would be making records on which he openly imitated Dylan's nasal drone, brittle strum, and introspective vocal persona"; and six months after that, Dylan began performing with a backing band and electric instrumentation, and "dressed in the height of Mod fashion". As a result, Gould continues, the traditional division between folk and rock enthusiasts "nearly evaporated", as the Beatles' fans began to mature in their outlook and Dylan's audience embraced the new, youth-driven pop culture.

During the 1964 US tour, the group were confronted with racial segregation. When informed that the venue for their 11 September concert, the Gator Bowl in Jacksonville, Florida, was segregated, the Beatles said they would refuse to perform unless the audience was integrated. Lennon stated: "We never play to segregated audiences and we aren't going to start now ... I'd sooner lose our appearance money." City officials relented and agreed to allow an integrated show. The group also cancelled their reservations at the whites-only Hotel George Washington in Jacksonville. For their subsequent US tours in 1965 and 1966, the Beatles included clauses in contracts stipulating that shows be integrated.

==== Beatles for Sale, Help! and Rubber Soul ====
According to Gould, the Beatles' fourth studio LP, Beatles for Sale, evidenced a growing conflict between the commercial pressures of their global success and their creative ambitions. They had intended the album, recorded between August and October 1964, to continue the format established by A Hard Day's Night which, unlike their first two LPs, contained only original songs. They had nearly exhausted their backlog of songs on the previous album, however, and given the challenges constant international touring posed to their songwriting efforts, Lennon admitted, "Material's becoming a hell of a problem". As a result, six covers from their extensive repertoire were chosen to complete the album. Released in early December, its eight original compositions stood out, demonstrating the growing maturity of the Lennon–McCartney songwriting partnership.

In early 1965, following a dinner with Lennon, Harrison and their wives, Harrison's dentist, John Riley, secretly added LSD to their coffee. Lennon described the experience: "It was just terrifying, but it was fantastic. I was pretty stunned for a month or two." McCartney was initially reluctant to try it, but eventually did so in late 1966. He became the first Beatle to discuss LSD publicly, declaring in a magazine interview that "it opened my eyes" and "made me a better, more honest, more tolerant member of society".

Controversy erupted in June 1965 when Queen Elizabeth II appointed all four Beatles Members of the Order of the British Empire (MBE) after Prime Minister Harold Wilson nominated them for the award. In protest – the honour was at that time primarily bestowed upon military veterans and civic leaders – some conservative MBE recipients returned their insignia.

In July, the Beatles' second film, Help!, was released, again directed by Lester. Described as "mainly a relentless spoof of Bond", it met a mixed response among both reviewers and the band. McCartney said: "Help! was great but it wasn't our film – we were sort of guest stars. It was fun, but basically, as an idea for a film, it was a bit wrong." The soundtrack was dominated by Lennon, who wrote and sang lead on most of its songs, including the two singles: "Help!" and "Ticket to Ride".

The Help! album, the group's fifth studio LP, mirrored A Hard Day's Night by featuring soundtrack songs on side one and additional songs from the same sessions on side two. The LP contained all original material save for two covers, "Act Naturally" and "Dizzy Miss Lizzy"; they were the last covers the band would include on an album until a brief rendition of the traditional Liverpool folk song "Maggie Mae" on Let It Be (1970). The band expanded their use of vocal overdubs on Help! and incorporated classical instruments into some arrangements, including a string quartet on "Yesterday". Composed and sung by McCartney – none of the other Beatles perform on the recording – "Yesterday" has inspired the most cover versions of any song ever written. With Help!, the Beatles became the first rock group nominated for a Grammy Award for Album of the Year.

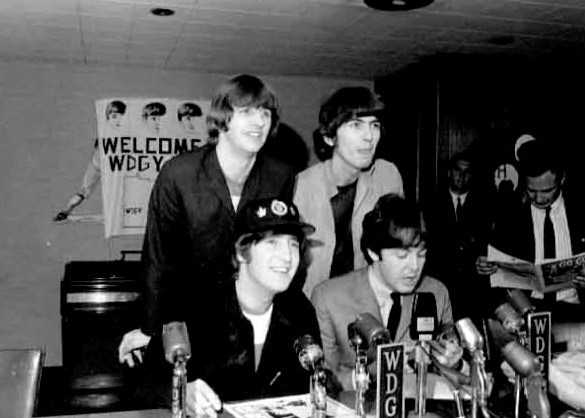
The Beatles at a press conference in Minnesota in August 1965, shortly after playing at Shea Stadium in New York

The group's third US tour opened with a performance before a world-record crowd of 55,600 at New York's Shea Stadium on 15 August – "perhaps the most famous of all Beatles' concerts". A further nine successful concerts followed in other American cities. At a show in Atlanta, the Beatles gave one of the first live performances ever to make use of a foldback system of on-stage monitor speakers. Towards the end of the tour, they met Elvis Presley, a foundational musical influence on the band, who invited them to his home in Beverly Hills. Presley later said the band was an example of a trend of anti-Americanism and drug abuse.

September 1965 saw the launch of an American Saturday-morning cartoon series, The Beatles, that echoed A Hard Day's Night's slapstick antics over its two-year original run. The series was the first weekly television series to feature animated versions of real, living people.

In mid-October, the Beatles entered the recording studio; for the first time when making an album, they had an extended period without other major commitments. Until this time, according to George Martin, "we had been making albums rather like a collection of singles. Now we were really beginning to think about albums as a bit of art on their own." Released in December, Rubber Soul was hailed by critics as a major step forward in the maturity and complexity of the band's music. Their thematic reach was beginning to expand as they embraced deeper aspects of romance and philosophy, a development that NEMS executive Peter Brown attributed to the band members' "now habitual use of marijuana". Lennon referred to Rubber Soul as "the pot album" and Starr said: "Grass was really influential in a lot of our changes, especially with the writers. And because they were writing different material, we were playing differently." After Help!'s foray into classical music with flutes and strings, Harrison's introduction of a sitar on "Norwegian Wood (This Bird Has Flown)" marked a further progression beyond the traditional boundaries of popular music. As the lyrics grew more artful, fans began to study them for deeper meaning.

"Norwegian Wood (This Bird Has Flown)"
Sample of "Norwegian Wood" from Rubber Soul (1965). Harrison's use of a sitar on this song is representative of the Beatles' incorporation of unconventional instrumentation into rock music.

While some of Rubber Soul's songs were the product of Lennon and McCartney's collaborative songwriting, the album also included distinct compositions from each, though they continued to share official credit. "In My Life", of which each later claimed lead authorship, is considered a highlight of the entire Lennon–McCartney catalogue. Harrison called Rubber Soul his "favourite album", and Starr referred to it as "the departure record". McCartney has said, "We'd had our cute period, and now it was time to expand." However, recording engineer Norman Smith later stated that the studio sessions revealed signs of growing conflict within the group – "the clash between John and Paul was becoming obvious", he wrote, and "as far as Paul was concerned, George could do no right".

In a 2024 interview with Dan Rather on AXS TV, Starr said, "We didn't get along. We were four guys, we had rows", noting that tensions grew even by the time he had children, though their rows "never got in the way of the music".

==== Controversies, Revolver and final tour ====
Capitol Records, from December 1963 when it began issuing Beatles recordings for the US market, exercised complete control over format, compiling distinct US albums from the band's recordings and issuing songs of their choosing as singles. (Note: It was not until Sgt. Pepper's Lonely Hearts Club Band in 1967 that a Beatles album was released with identical track listings in both the UK and the US.) In June 1966, the Capitol LP Yesterday and Today caused an uproar with its cover, which portrayed the grinning Beatles dressed in butcher's overalls, accompanied by raw meat and mutilated plastic baby dolls. According to Beatles biographer Bill Harry, it has been incorrectly suggested that this was meant as a satirical response to the way Capitol had "butchered" the US versions of the band's albums. Thousands of copies of the LP had a new cover pasted over the original; an unpeeled "first-state" copy fetched $10,500 at a December 2005 auction. In England, meanwhile, Harrison met sitar maestro Ravi Shankar, who agreed to train him on the instrument.

The month after the Yesterday and Today furore, the Beatles toured Japan, where they faced death threats from Japanese traditionalists for performing at the Nippon Budokan martial-arts hall. When they toured the Philippines a few days later, the Beatles unintentionally snubbed the nation's first lady, Imelda Marcos, who had expected them to attend a breakfast reception at the Presidential Palace. When presented with the invitation, Epstein politely declined on the band members' behalf, as it had never been his policy to accept such official invitations. They soon found that the Marcos regime was unaccustomed to taking no for an answer. The resulting riots endangered the group and they escaped the country with difficulty. Immediately afterwards, the band members visited India for the first time.

We're more popular than Jesus now; I don't know which will go first – rock 'n' roll or Christianity.

— John Lennon, 1966

Almost as soon as they returned home, the Beatles faced a fierce backlash from US religious and social conservatives (as well as the Ku Klux Klan) over a comment Lennon had made in a March interview with British reporter Maureen Cleave. "Christianity will go", Lennon had said. "It will vanish and shrink. I needn't argue about that; I'm right and I will be proved right ... Jesus was alright but his disciples were thick and ordinary. It's them twisting it that ruins it for me." His comments went virtually unnoticed in England, but when US teenage fan magazine Datebook printed them five months later, it sparked a controversy with Christians in America's conservative Bible Belt region. The Vatican issued a protest, and bans on Beatles records were imposed by Spanish and Dutch stations and South Africa's national broadcasting service. Epstein accused Datebook of having taken Lennon's words out of context. At a press conference, Lennon pointed out, "If I'd said television was more popular than Jesus, I might have got away with it." He claimed that he was referring to how other people viewed their success, but at the prompting of reporters, he concluded: "If you want me to apologise, if that will make you happy, then okay, I'm sorry."

"Eleanor Rigby"
Sample of "Eleanor Rigby" from Revolver (1966). The album involves innovative compositional approaches, arrangements and recording techniques. This song, primarily written by McCartney, prominently features classical strings in a novel fusion of musical styles.

Released in August 1966, a week before the Beatles' final tour, Revolver marked another artistic step forward for the group. The album featured sophisticated songwriting, studio experimentation and a greatly expanded repertoire of musical styles, ranging from innovative classical string arrangements to psychedelia. Abandoning the customary group photograph, its Aubrey Beardsley-inspired cover – designed by Klaus Voormann, a friend of the band since their Hamburg days – was a monochrome collage and line drawing caricature of the group. The album was preceded by the single "Paperback Writer", backed by "Rain". Short promotional films were made for both songs; described by cultural historian Saul Austerlitz as "among the first true music videos", they aired on The Ed Sullivan Show and Top of the Pops in June.

Among the experimental songs on Revolver was "Tomorrow Never Knows", the lyrics for which Lennon drew from Timothy Leary's The Psychedelic Experience: A Manual Based on the Tibetan Book of the Dead. Its creation involved eight tape decks distributed about the EMI building, each staffed by an engineer or band member, who randomly varied the movement of a tape loop while Martin created a composite recording by sampling the incoming data. McCartney's "Eleanor Rigby" made prominent use of a string octet; Gould describes it as "a true hybrid, conforming to no recognisable style or genre of song". Harrison's emergence as a songwriter was reflected in three of his compositions appearing on the record. Among these, "Taxman", which opened the album, marked the first example of the Beatles making a political statement through their music.

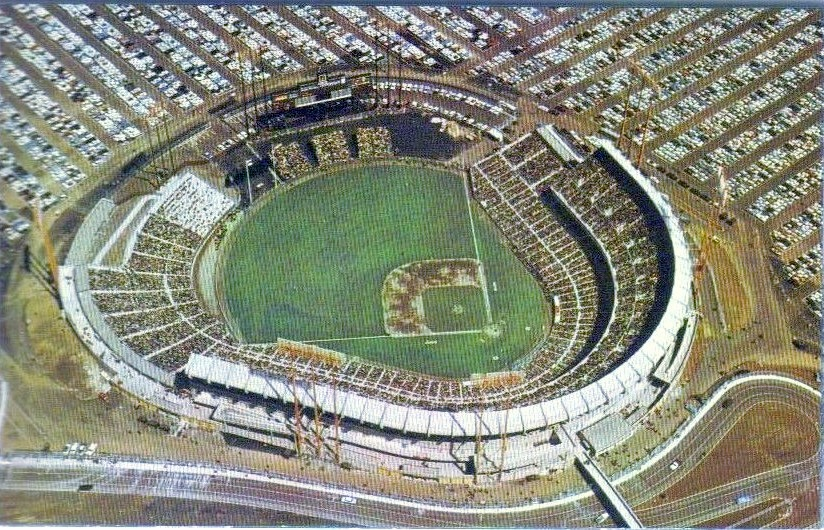
San Francisco's Candlestick Park (pictured in the early 1960s) was the venue for the Beatles' final concert before a paying audience.

As preparations were made for a tour of the US, the Beatles knew that their music would hardly be heard. Having originally used Vox AC30 amplifiers, they later acquired more powerful 100-watt amplifiers, specially designed for them by Vox, as they moved into larger venues in 1964; however, these were still inadequate. Struggling to compete with the volume of sound generated by screaming fans, the band had grown increasingly bored with the routine of performing live. Recognising that their shows were no longer about the music, and shaken up from the recent incident in the Philippines, they decided to make the August tour their last.

The band performed none of their new songs on the tour. In Chris Ingham's description, they were very much "studio creations ... and there was no way a four-piece rock 'n' roll group could do them justice, particularly through the desensitising wall of the fans' screams. 'Live Beatles' and 'Studio Beatles' had become entirely different beasts." The band's concert at San Francisco's Candlestick Park on 29 August was their last commercial concert. It marked the end of four years dominated by almost nonstop touring that included over 1,400 concert appearances internationally.

=== 1966–1970: Studio years and breakup ===
==== Sgt. Pepper's Lonely Hearts Club Band ====
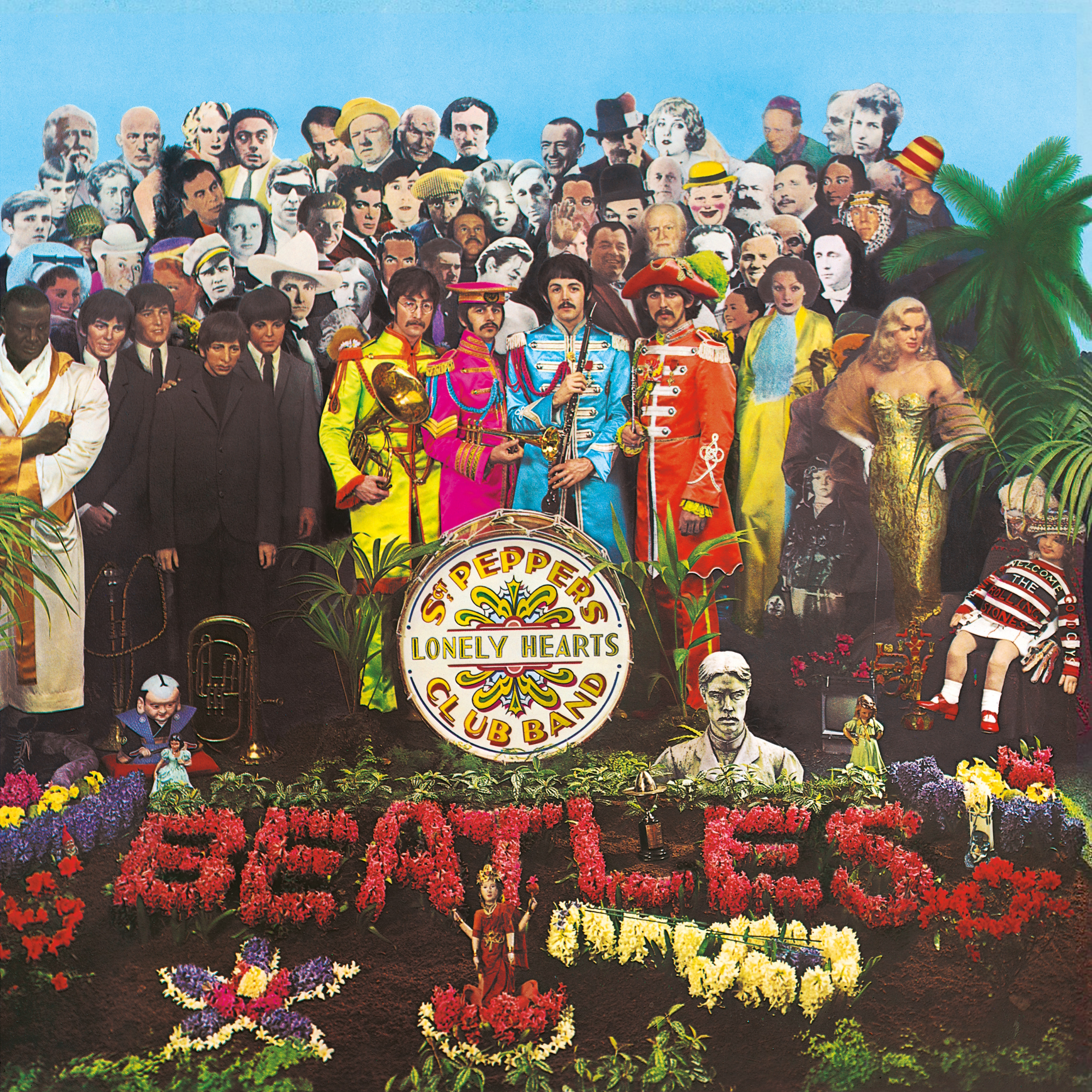
Front cover of Sgt. Pepper's Lonely Hearts Club Band, "the most famous cover of any music album, and one of the most imitated images in the world"

Freed from the burden of touring, the Beatles embraced an increasingly experimental approach as they recorded Sgt. Pepper's Lonely Hearts Club Band, beginning in late November 1966. According to engineer Geoff Emerick, the album's recording took over 700 hours. He recalled the band's insistence "that everything on Sgt. Pepper had to be different. We had microphones right down in the bells of brass instruments and headphones turned into microphones attached to violins. We used giant primitive oscillators to vary the speed of instruments and vocals and we had tapes chopped to pieces and stuck together upside down and the wrong way around." Parts of "A Day in the Life" featured a 40-piece orchestra. The sessions initially yielded the non-album double A-side single "Strawberry Fields Forever"/"Penny Lane" in February 1967; the Sgt. Pepper LP followed with a rush-release in May. The musical complexity of the records, created using relatively primitive four-track recording technology, astounded contemporary artists. Among music critics, acclaim for the album was virtually universal. Gould wrote:

The overwhelming consensus is that the Beatles had created a popular masterpiece: a rich, sustained, and overflowing work of collaborative genius whose bold ambition and startling originality dramatically enlarged the possibilities and raised the expectations of what the experience of listening to popular music on record could be. On the basis of this perception, Sgt. Pepper became the catalyst for an explosion of mass enthusiasm for album-formatted rock that would revolutionise both the aesthetics and the economics of the record business in ways that far outstripped the earlier pop explosions triggered by the Elvis phenomenon of 1956 and the Beatlemania phenomenon of 1963.

In the wake of Sgt. Pepper, the underground and mainstream press widely publicised the Beatles as leaders of youth culture, as well as "lifestyle revolutionaries". The album was the first major pop/rock LP to include its complete lyrics, which appeared on the back cover. Those lyrics were the subject of critical analysis; in late 1967 the album was the subject of a scholarly inquiry by American literary critic and professor of English Richard Poirier, who observed that his students were "listening to the group's music with a degree of engagement that he, as a teacher of literature, could only envy". (Note: Poirier identified what he termed its "mixed allusiveness": "It's unwise ever to assume that they're doing only one thing or expressing themselves in only one style ... one kind of feeling about a subject isn't enough ... any single induced feeling must often exist within the context of seemingly contradictory alternatives." McCartney said at the time: "We write songs. We know what we mean by them. But in a week someone else says something about it, and you can't deny it. ... You put your own meaning at your own level to our songs.") The elaborate cover also attracted considerable interest and study. A collage designed by pop artists Peter Blake and Jann Haworth, it depicted the group as the fictional band referred to in the album's title track standing in front of a crowd of famous people. The heavy moustaches worn by the group reflected the growing influence of the hippie movement, while cultural historian Jonathan Harris describes their "brightly coloured parodies of military uniforms" as a knowingly "anti-authoritarian and anti-establishment" display.

Sgt. Pepper topped the UK charts for 23 consecutive weeks, with a further four weeks at number one until February 1968. With 2.5 million copies sold within three months of its release, Sgt. Pepper's initial commercial success exceeded that of all previous Beatles albums. It was the first rock album to win the Grammy Award for Album of the Year. It sustained its immense popularity into the 21st century while breaking numerous sales records.

==== Magical Mystery Tour and Yellow Submarine ====
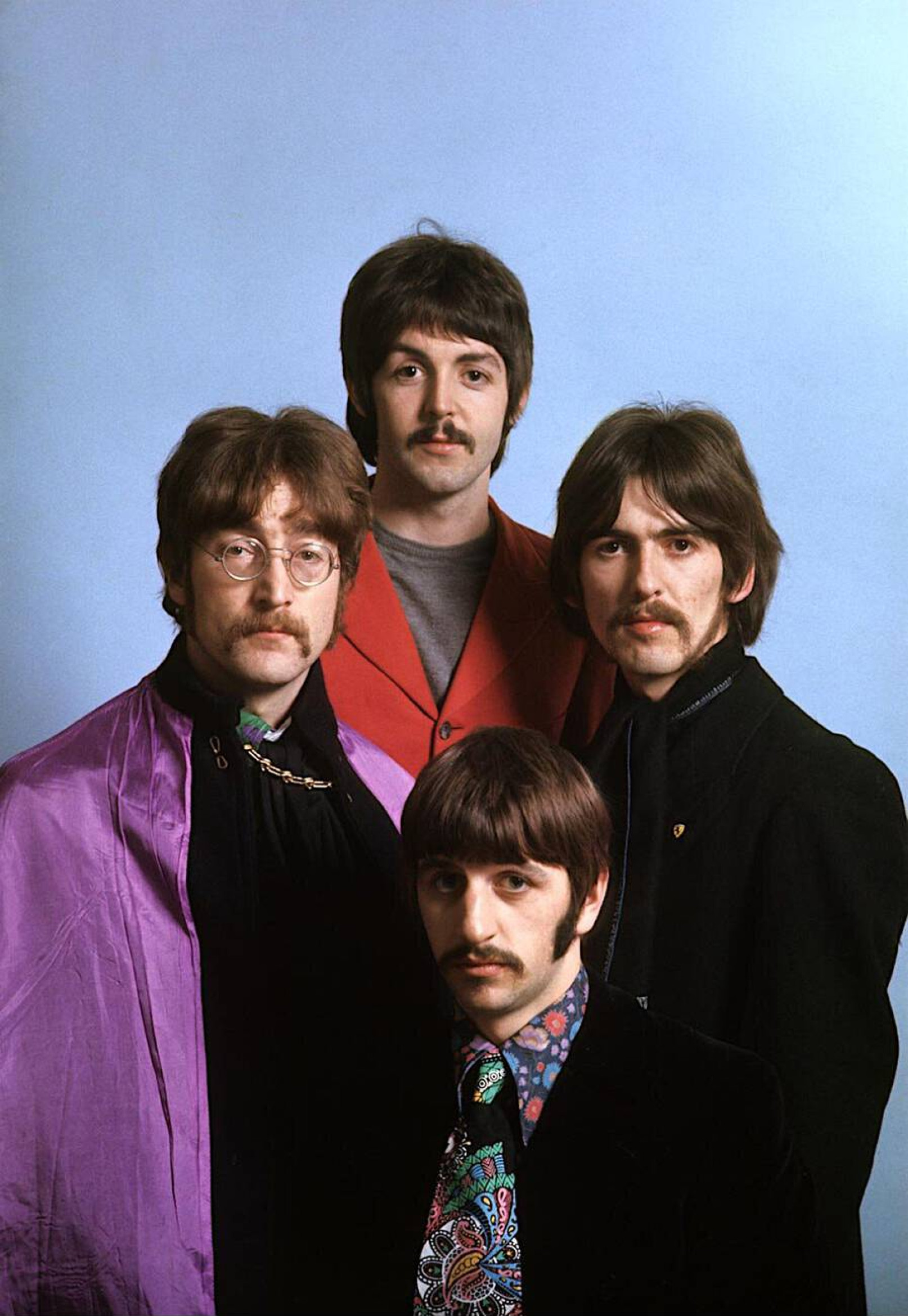
The Beatles in a promotional photo for "All You Need Is Love" in 1967

Two Beatles film projects were conceived within weeks of completing Sgt. Pepper: Magical Mystery Tour, a one-hour television film, and Yellow Submarine, an animated feature-length film produced by United Artists. The group began recording music for the former in late April 1967, but the project then lay dormant as they focused on recording songs for the latter. On 25 June, the Beatles performed their forthcoming single "All You Need Is Love" to an estimated 350 million viewers on Our World, the first live global television link. Released a week later, during the Summer of Love, the song was adopted as a flower power anthem. The Beatles' use of psychedelic drugs was at its height during that summer. In July and August, the group pursued interests related to similar utopian-based ideology, including a week-long investigation into the possibility of starting an island-based commune off the coast of Greece.

On 24 August, the group were introduced to Maharishi Mahesh Yogi in London. The next day, they travelled to Bangor for his Transcendental Meditation retreat. On 27 August, their manager's assistant, Peter Brown, phoned to inform them that Epstein had died. The coroner ruled the death an accidental carbitol overdose, although it was widely rumoured to be a suicide. (Note: Epstein had been in a fragile emotional state, stressed by personal troubles. It was speculated that he was concerned that the band might not renew his management contract, due to expire in October, over discontent with his supervision of business matters, particularly regarding Seltaeb, the company that handled their US merchandising rights.) His death left the group disoriented and fearful about the future. Lennon recalled: "We collapsed. I knew that we were in trouble then. I didn't really have any misconceptions about our ability to do anything other than play music, and I was scared. I thought, 'We've fuckin' had it now.'" Harrison's then-wife Pattie Boyd remembered that "Paul and George were in complete shock. I don't think it could have been worse if they had heard that their own fathers had dropped dead." During a band meeting in September, McCartney recommended that the band proceed with Magical Mystery Tour.

The Magical Mystery Tour soundtrack was released in the UK as a six-track double extended play (EP) in early December 1967. It was the first example of a double EP in the UK. The record carried on the psychedelic vein of Sgt. Pepper, though in line with the band's wishes, the packaging reinforced the idea that the release was a film soundtrack rather than a follow-up to Sgt. Pepper. In the US, the soundtrack appeared as an identically titled LP that also included five tracks from the band's recent singles. In its first three weeks, the album set a record for the highest initial sales of any Capitol LP and is the only Capitol compilation to be adopted in the band's official canon of studio albums.

Magical Mystery Tour first aired on Boxing Day to an audience of approximately 15 million. Largely directed by McCartney, the film was the band's first critical failure in the UK. It was dismissed as "blatant rubbish" by the Daily Express, the Daily Mail called it "a colossal conceit" and The Guardian labelled the film "a kind of fantasy morality play about the grossness and warmth and stupidity of the audience". Gould describes it as "a great deal of raw footage showing a group of people getting on, getting off, and riding on a bus". Although the viewership figures were respectable, its slating in the press led US television networks to lose interest in broadcasting the film.

The group were less involved with Yellow Submarine, which featured the band appearing as themselves for only a short live-action segment. Premiering in July 1968, the film featured cartoon versions of the band members and a soundtrack with eleven of their songs, including four unreleased studio recordings that made their debut in the film. Critics praised the film for its music, humour and innovative visual style. A soundtrack LP was issued seven months later; it contained those four new songs (including "Hey Bulldog"), the title track (already issued on Revolver), "All You Need Is Love" (already issued as a single and on the US Magical Mystery Tour LP) and seven instrumental pieces composed by Martin.

==== India retreat, Apple Corps and the White Album ====
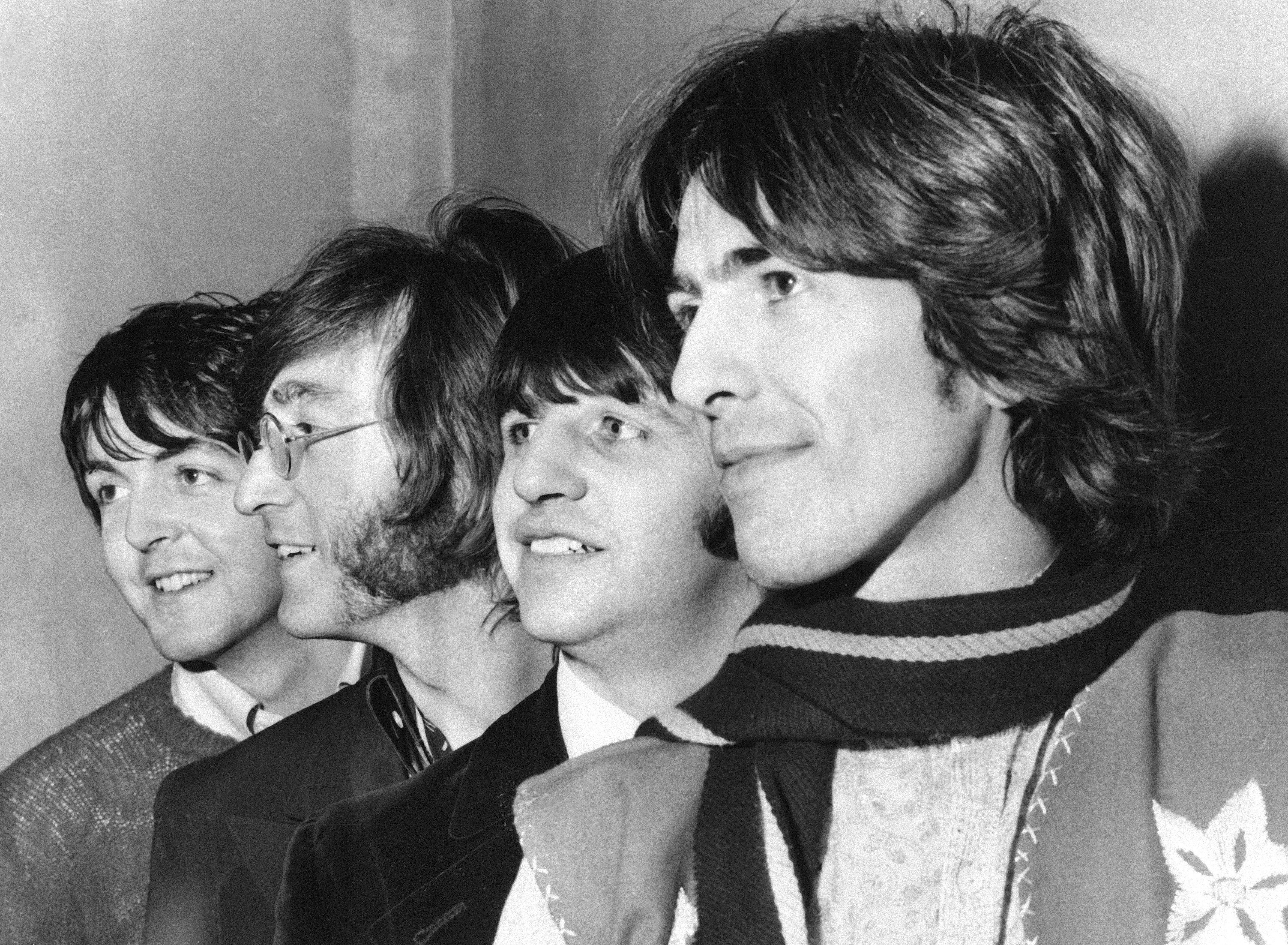
The Beatles during the "Lady Madonna" photo session, February 1968

In February 1968, the Beatles travelled to Maharishi Mahesh Yogi's ashram in Rishikesh, India, to take part in a three-month meditation "Guide Course". Their time in India marked one of the band's most prolific periods, yielding numerous songs, including a majority of those on their next album. However, Starr left after only ten days, unable to stomach the food, and McCartney eventually grew bored and departed a month later. For Lennon and Harrison, creativity turned to suspicion when an electronics technician known as Magic Alex suggested that the Maharishi was attempting to manipulate them. When he alleged that the Maharishi had made sexual advances to women attendees, a persuaded Lennon left abruptly just two months into the course, bringing an unconvinced Harrison and the remainder of the group's entourage with him. In anger, Lennon wrote a scathing song titled "Maharishi", renamed "Sexy Sadie" to avoid potential legal issues. McCartney said, "We made a mistake. We thought there was more to him than there was."

In May, Lennon and McCartney travelled to New York for the public unveiling of the Beatles' new business venture, Apple Corps. It was initially formed several months earlier as part of a plan to create a tax-effective business structure, but the band then desired to extend the corporation to other pursuits, including record distribution, peace activism and education. McCartney described Apple as "rather like a Western communism". The enterprise drained the group financially with a series of unsuccessful projects handled largely by members of the Beatles' entourage, who were given their jobs regardless of talent and experience. Among its numerous subsidiaries were Apple Electronics, established to foster technological innovations with Magic Alex at the head, and Apple Retailing, which opened the short-lived Apple Boutique in London. Harrison later said, "Basically, it was chaos ... John and Paul got carried away with the idea and blew millions, and Ringo and I just had to go along with it."

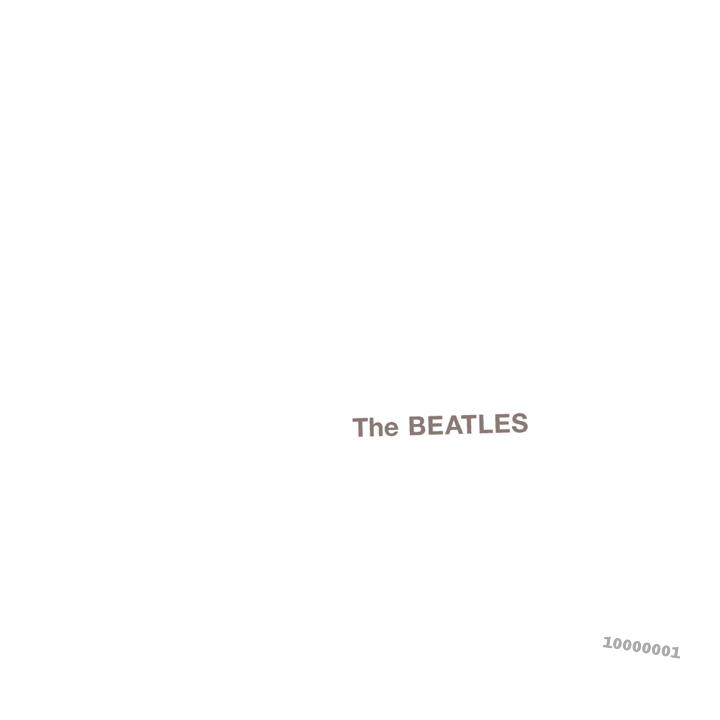
The Beatles, known as "the White Album" for its minimalist cover, conceived by pop artist Richard Hamilton "in direct contrast to Sgt. Pepper", while also suggesting a "clean slate"

From late May to mid-October 1968, the group recorded what became The Beatles, a double LP commonly known as "the White Album" for its virtually featureless cover. During this time, relations between the members grew openly divisive. Starr quit for two weeks, leaving his bandmates to record "Back in the U.S.S.R." and "Dear Prudence" as a trio, with McCartney filling in on drums. Lennon had lost interest in collaborating with McCartney, whose "Ob-La-Di, Ob-La-Da" he scorned as "granny music shit". Tensions were further aggravated by Lennon's romantic preoccupation with avant-garde artist Yoko Ono, whom he insisted on bringing to the sessions despite the group's well-established understanding that girlfriends were not allowed in the studio. McCartney has recalled that the album "wasn't a pleasant one to make". He and Lennon identified the sessions as the start of the band's break-up.

With the record, the band executed a wider range of musical styles and broke with their recent tradition of incorporating several musical styles in one song by keeping each piece of music consistently faithful to a select genre. During the sessions, the group upgraded to an eight-track tape console, which made it easier for them to layer tracks piecemeal, while the members often recorded independently of each other, affording the album a reputation as a collection of solo recordings rather than a unified group effort. Describing the double album, Lennon later said: "Every track is an individual track; there isn't any Beatle music on it. [It's] John and the band, Paul and the band, George and the band." The sessions also produced the Beatles' longest song yet, "Hey Jude", released in August as a non-album single with "Revolution".

Issued in November, the White Album was the band's first Apple Records album release, although EMI continued to own their recordings. The record attracted more than 2 million advance orders, selling nearly 4 million copies in the US in little over a month, and its tracks dominated the playlists of American radio stations. Its lyrical content was the focus of much analysis by the counterculture. Tony Palmer wrote that "if there is still any doubt that Lennon and McCartney are the greatest songwriters since Schubert", the album "should surely see the last vestiges of cultural snobbery and bourgeois prejudice swept away in a deluge of joyful music making".

==== Abbey Road, Let It Be and separation ====
Although Let It Be was the Beatles' final album release, it was largely recorded before Abbey Road. The project's impetus came from an idea Martin attributes to McCartney, who suggested they "record an album of new material and rehearse it, then perform it before a live audience for the very first time – on record and on film". Originally intended for a one-hour television programme to be called Beatles at Work, in the event much of the album's content came from studio work beginning in January 1969, many hours of which were captured on film by director Michael Lindsay-Hogg. Martin said that the project was "not at all a happy recording experience. It was a time when relations between the Beatles were at their lowest ebb." Lennon described the largely impromptu sessions as "hell ... the most miserable ... on Earth", and Harrison, "the low of all-time". Irritated by McCartney and Lennon, Harrison walked out for five days. Upon returning, he threatened to leave the band unless they "abandon[ed] all talk of live performance" and instead focused on finishing a new album, initially titled Get Back, using songs recorded for the TV special. He also demanded they cease work at Twickenham Film Studios, where the sessions had begun, and relocate to the newly finished Apple Studio. His bandmates agreed and it was decided to salvage the footage shot for the TV production for use in a feature film.

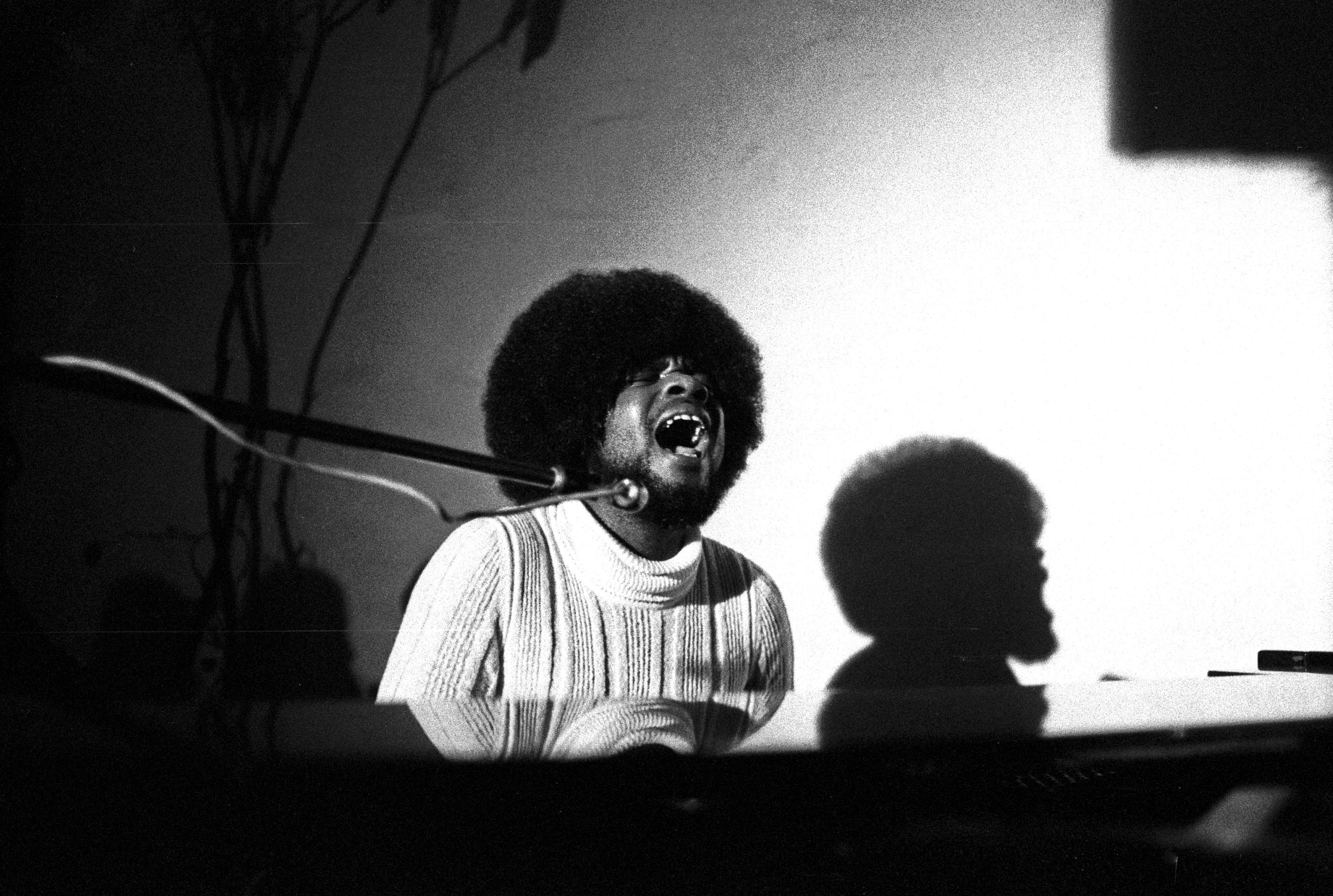
The American soul musician Billy Preston (pictured in 1971) was often referred to as a "fifth Beatle" during the Get Back sessions.

To alleviate tensions within the band and improve the quality of their live sound, Harrison invited keyboardist Billy Preston to participate in the last nine days of sessions. Preston received label billing on the "Get Back" single – the only musician ever to receive that acknowledgment on an official Beatles release. After the rehearsals, the band could not agree on a location to film a concert, rejecting several ideas, including a boat at sea, a lunatic asylum, the Libyan desert and the Colosseum. Ultimately, what would be their final live performance was filmed on the rooftop of the Apple Corps building at 3 Savile Row, London, on 30 January 1969. Five weeks later, engineer Glyn Johns, whom Lewisohn describes as Get Back's "uncredited producer", began work assembling an album, given "free rein" as the band "all but washed their hands of the entire project".

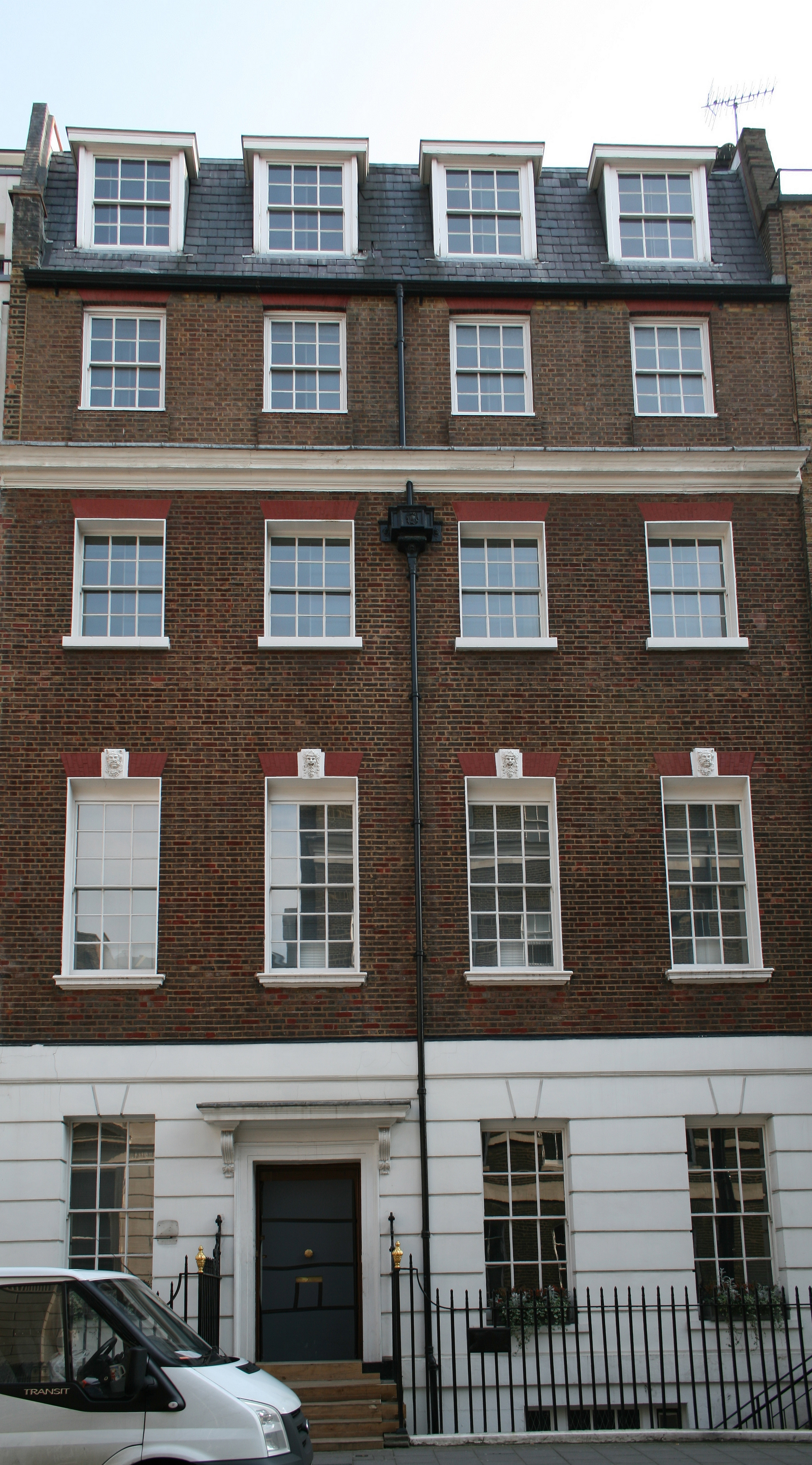
Apple Corps building at 3 Savile Row, site of the Let It Be rooftop concert

New strains developed between the band members regarding the appointment of a financial adviser, the need for which had become evident without Epstein to manage business affairs. Lennon, Harrison and Starr favoured Allen Klein, who had managed the Rolling Stones and Sam Cooke; McCartney wanted Lee and John Eastman – father and brother, respectively, of Linda Eastman, whom McCartney married on 12 March. Agreement could not be reached, so both Klein and the Eastmans were temporarily appointed: Klein as the Beatles' business manager and the Eastmans as their lawyers. Further conflict ensued, however, and financial opportunities were lost. On 8 May, Klein was named sole manager of the band, the Eastmans having previously been dismissed as the Beatles' lawyers. McCartney refused to sign the management contract with Klein, but he was out-voted by the other Beatles.

Martin stated that he was surprised when McCartney asked him to produce another album, as the Get Back sessions had been "a miserable experience" and he had "thought it was the end of the road for all of us". The primary recording sessions for Abbey Road began on 2 July. Lennon, who rejected Martin's proposed format of a "continuously moving piece of music", wanted his and McCartney's songs to occupy separate sides of the album. The eventual format, with individually composed songs on the first side and the second consisting largely of a medley, was McCartney's suggested compromise. Emerick noted that the replacement of the studio's valve-based mixing console with a transistorised one yielded a less punchy sound, leaving the group frustrated at the thinner tone and lack of impact and contributing to its "kinder, gentler" feel relative to their previous albums.

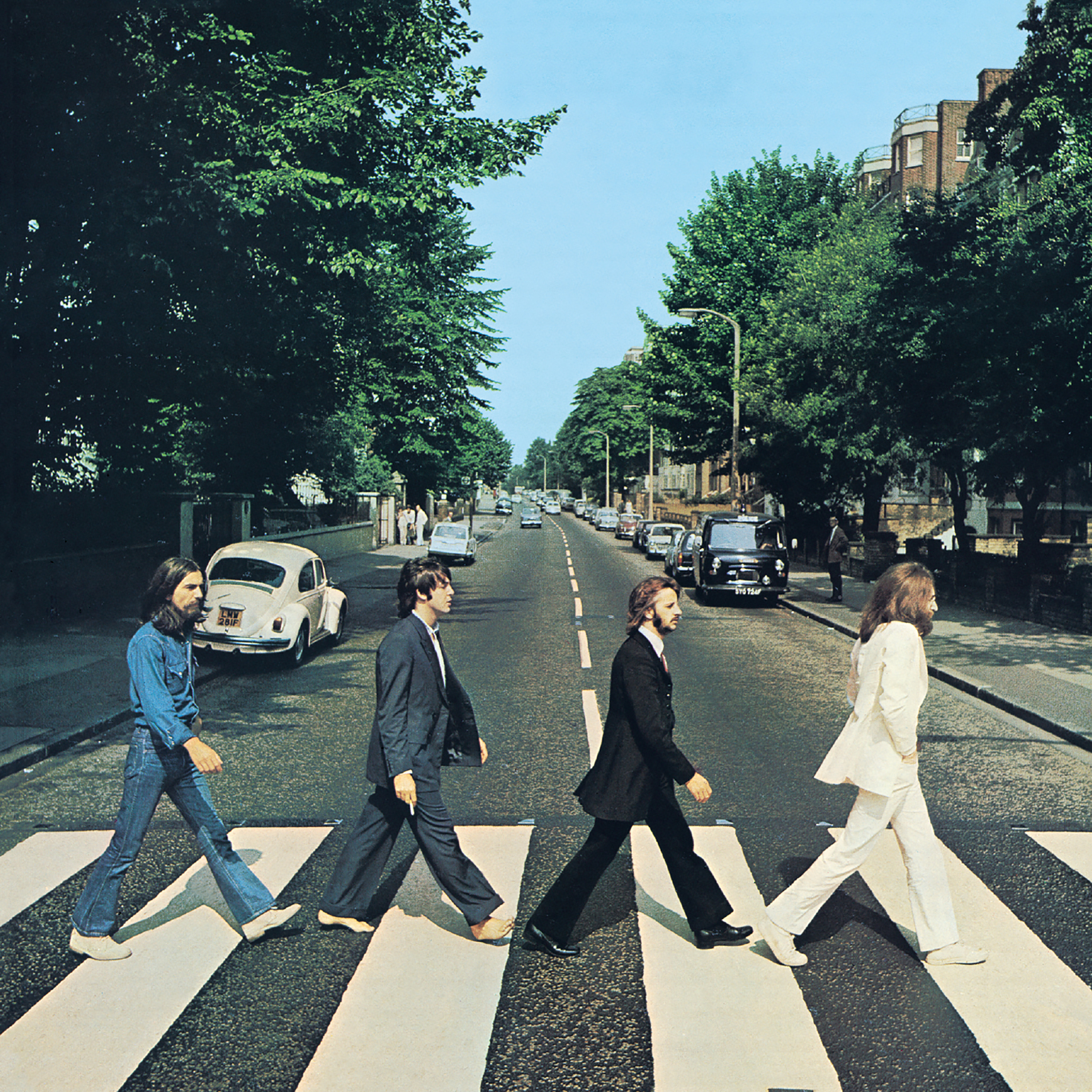
Following Sgt. Pepper, the Abbey Road album cover became another iconic image in Beatles history. From left: Harrison, McCartney, Starr, Lennon.

On 4 July, the first solo single by a Beatle was released: Lennon's "Give Peace a Chance", credited to the Plastic Ono Band. The completion and mixing of "I Want You (She's So Heavy)" on 20 August was the last occasion on which all four Beatles were together in the same studio. Two days later, the band gathered at Lennon's Tittenhurst Park estate for their final photo session.

The Beatles during their final photo session at Tittenhurst Park on 22 August 1969

On 8 September, while Starr was in hospital, the other band members met to discuss recording a new album. They considered a different approach to songwriting by ending the Lennon–McCartney pretence and having four compositions apiece from Lennon, McCartney and Harrison, with two from Starr and a lead single around Christmas. On 20 September, Lennon announced his departure to the rest of the group but agreed to withhold a public announcement to avoid undermining sales of the forthcoming album.

Released on 26 September, Abbey Road sold four million copies within three months and topped the UK charts for a total of seventeen weeks. Its second track, the ballad "Something", was issued as a single – the only Harrison composition that appeared as a Beatles A-side. Unterberger considers it "a fitting swan song for the group", containing "some of the greatest harmonies to be heard on any rock record". Martin singled it out as his favourite Beatles album; Lennon said it was "competent" but had "no life in it". It closes with a medley of short songs, beginning with "You Never Give Me Your Money" and ending with "The End".

For the still unfinished Get Back album, one last song, Harrison's "I Me Mine", was recorded on 3 January 1970. Lennon, in Denmark at the time, did not participate. In March, rejecting the work Johns had done on the project, now retitled Let It Be, Klein gave the session tapes to American producer Phil Spector, who had recently produced Lennon's solo single "Instant Karma!". In addition to remixing the material, Spector edited, spliced and overdubbed several of the recordings that had been intended as "live". McCartney was unhappy with the producer's approach and particularly dissatisfied with the lavish orchestration on "The Long and Winding Road", which involved a fourteen-voice choir and 36-piece instrumental ensemble. McCartney's demands that the alterations to the song be reverted were ignored, and he publicly announced his departure from the band on 10 April, a week before the release of his first self-titled solo album.

On 8 May 1970, Let It Be was released. Its accompanying single, "The Long and Winding Road", was expected to be the Beatles' last; it was released in the US, but not in the UK. The Let It Be documentary film followed later that month and won the 1970 Academy Award for Best Original Song Score. Sunday Telegraph critic Penelope Gilliatt called it "a very bad film and a touching one ... about the breaking apart of this reassuring, geometrically perfect, once apparently ageless family of siblings". Several reviewers stated that some of the performances in the film sounded better than their analogous album tracks. Describing Let It Be as the "only Beatles album to occasion negative, even hostile reviews", Unterberger calls it "on the whole underrated"; he singles out "some good moments of straight hard rock in 'I've Got a Feeling' and 'Dig a Pony'" and praises "Let It Be", "Get Back" and "the folky 'Two of Us', with John and Paul harmonising together".

McCartney filed suit for the dissolution of the Beatles' contractual partnership on 31 December 1970. Legal disputes continued long after their break-up and the dissolution was not formalised until 29 December 1974, when Lennon signed the paperwork terminating the partnership while on holiday with his family at Florida's Walt Disney World.

=== Post-breakup activities ===
==== 1970s ====
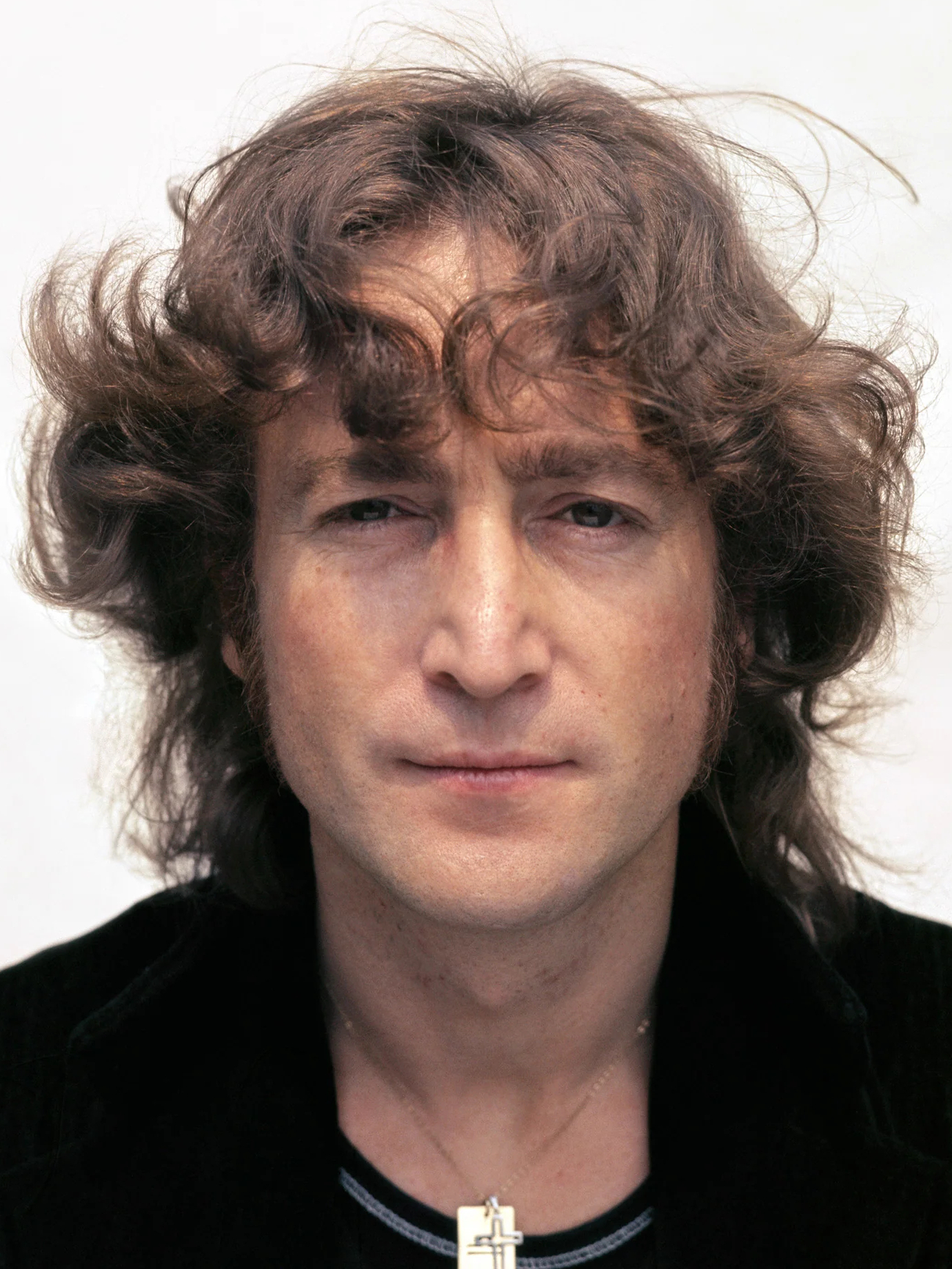
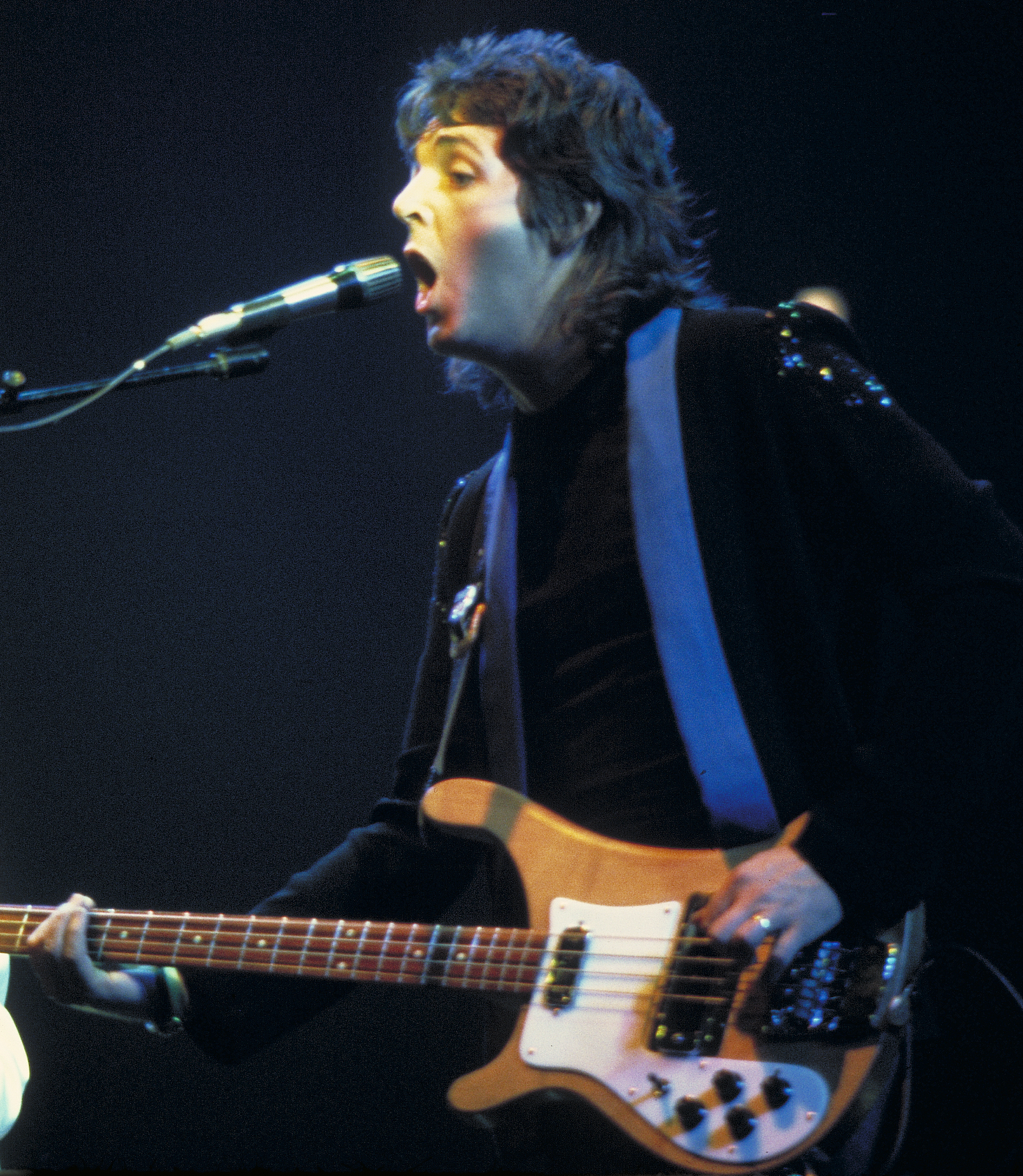
Lennon in 1974 and McCartney in 1976

Lennon, McCartney, Harrison and Starr all released solo albums in 1970. Their solo records sometimes involved one or more of the other members; Starr's Ringo (1973) was the only album to include compositions and performances by all four ex-Beatles, albeit on separate songs. With Starr's participation, Harrison staged the Concert for Bangladesh in New York City in August 1971. Other than an unreleased jam session in 1974, later bootlegged as A Toot and a Snore in '74, Lennon and McCartney never recorded together again.

Two double-LP sets of the Beatles' greatest hits, 1962–1966 and 1967–1970, were released in 1973, at first under the Apple Records imprint. Commonly known as the "Red Album" and "Blue Album", respectively, each has earned a Multi-Platinum certification in the US and a Platinum certification in the UK. Between 1976 and 1982, EMI/Capitol released a wave of compilation albums without input from the ex-Beatles, starting with the double-disc compilation Rock 'n' Roll Music. The only one to feature previously unreleased material was The Beatles at the Hollywood Bowl (1977); the first officially issued concert recordings by the group, it contained selections from two shows they played during their 1964 and 1965 US tours. (Note: The band unsuccessfully attempted to block the 1977 release of Live! at the Star-Club in Hamburg, Germany; 1962. The independently issued album compiled recordings made during the group's Hamburg residency, taped on a basic recording machine using only one microphone.)

The music and enduring fame of the Beatles were commercially exploited in various other ways, again often outside their creative control. In April 1974, the musical John, Paul, George, Ringo ... and Bert, written by Willy Russell and featuring singer Barbara Dickson, opened in London. It included, with permission from Northern Songs, eleven Lennon–McCartney compositions and one by Harrison, "Here Comes the Sun". Displeased with the production's use of his song, Harrison withdrew his permission to use it. Later that year, the off-Broadway musical Sgt. Pepper's Lonely Hearts Club Band on the Road opened. All This and World War II (1976) was an unorthodox nonfiction film that combined newsreel footage with covers of Beatles songs by performers ranging from Elton John and Keith Moon to the London Symphony Orchestra. The Broadway musical Beatlemania, an unauthorised nostalgia revue, opened in early 1977 and proved popular, spinning off five separate touring productions. In 1979, the band sued the producers, settling for several million dollars in damages. Sgt. Pepper's Lonely Hearts Club Band (1978), a musical film starring the Bee Gees and Peter Frampton, was a commercial failure and an "artistic fiasco", according to Ingham.

Accompanying the wave of Beatles nostalgia and persistent reunion rumours in the US during the 1970s, several entrepreneurs made public offers to the Beatles for a reunion concert. Promoter Bill Sargent first offered the Beatles $10 million for a reunion concert in 1974. He raised his offer to $30 million in January 1976 and then to $50 million the following month. On 24 April 1976, during a broadcast of Saturday Night Live, producer Lorne Michaels jokingly offered the Beatles $3,000 to reunite on the show. Lennon and McCartney were watching the live broadcast at Lennon's apartment at the Dakota in New York, which was within driving distance of the NBC studio where the show was being broadcast. The former bandmates briefly entertained the idea of going to the studio and surprising Michaels by accepting his offer, but decided not to. Robert Zemeckis's I Wanna Hold Your Hand (1978) is about a group of teenagers trying to get tickets to see the Beatles on the Ed Sullivan Show; a running gag in the film is that the Beatles themselves do not appear.

==== 1980s ====
In December 1980, Lennon was shot and killed outside his New York City apartment by Mark David Chapman, an American former Beatles fan. Harrison rewrote the lyrics of his song "All Those Years Ago" in Lennon's honour. With Starr on drums and McCartney and his wife, Linda, contributing backing vocals, the song was released as a single in May 1981. McCartney's own tribute, "Here Today", appeared on his Tug of War album in April 1982. In 1984, Starr co-starred in McCartney's film Give My Regards to Broad Street, and played with McCartney on several songs on the soundtrack. In 1987, Harrison's Cloud Nine album included "When We Was Fab", a song about the Beatlemania era.

When the Beatles' studio albums were released on CD by EMI and Apple Corps in 1987, their catalogue was standardised throughout the world, establishing a canon of the twelve original studio LPs as issued in the UK plus the US LP version of Magical Mystery Tour. All the remaining material from the singles and EPs that had not appeared on these thirteen studio albums was gathered on the two-volume compilation Past Masters (1988). Except for the Red and Blue albums, EMI deleted all its other Beatles compilations – including the Hollywood Bowl record – from its catalogue.

The Beatles were inducted into the Rock and Roll Hall of Fame in 1988, their first year of eligibility. Harrison and Starr attended the ceremony with Lennon's widow, Yoko Ono, and his two sons, Julian and Sean. McCartney declined to attend, citing unresolved "business differences" that would make him "feel like a complete hypocrite waving and smiling with them at a fake reunion". The following year, EMI/Capitol settled a decade-long lawsuit filed by the band over royalties, clearing the way to commercially package previously unreleased material.

==== 1990s ====
Live at the BBC, the first official release of unissued Beatles performances in 17 years, appeared in 1994. That same year McCartney, Harrison and Starr collaborated on the Anthology project. Anthology was the culmination of work begun in 1970, when Apple Corps director Neil Aspinall, their former road manager and personal assistant, had started to gather material for a documentary with the working title The Long and Winding Road.

During 1995–96, the project yielded a television miniseries, an eight-volume video set and three two-CD/three-LP box sets featuring artwork by Klaus Voormann. Documenting their history in the band's own words, the Anthology project included the release of several unissued Beatles recordings. Alongside producer Jeff Lynne, McCartney, Harrison and Starr also added new instrumental and vocal parts to songs recorded as demos by Lennon in the late 1970s, resulting in the release of two "new" Beatles singles, "Free as a Bird" and "Real Love". A third Lennon demo, "Now and Then", was also attempted, but abandoned due to the low quality of the recording. The Anthology releases were commercially successful and the television series was viewed by an estimated 400 million people. A book, The Beatles Anthology, followed in October 2000. In 1999, to coincide with the re-release of the 1968 film Yellow Submarine, an expanded soundtrack album, Yellow Submarine Songtrack, was issued.

==== 2000s ====
1, a compilation album of the Beatles' British and American number-one hits, was released on 13 November 2000. It became the fastest-selling album of all time, with 3.6 million sold in its first week and 13 million within a month. It topped albums charts in at least 28 countries. The compilation had sold 31 million copies globally by April 2009.

Harrison died from metastatic lung cancer in November 2001. McCartney and Starr were among the musicians who performed at the Concert for George, organised by Eric Clapton and Harrison's widow, Olivia. The tribute took place at the Royal Albert Hall on the first anniversary of Harrison's death.

In 2003, Let It Be... Naked, a reconceived version of Let It Be, with McCartney supervising production, was released. One of the main differences from the Spector-produced version was the omission of the original string arrangements. It was a top-ten hit in both Britain and America. The US album configurations from 1964 to 1965 were released as box sets in 2004 and 2006; The Capitol Albums, Volume 1 and Volume 2 included both stereo and mono versions based on the mixes that were prepared for vinyl at the time of the music's original American release.

As a soundtrack for Cirque du Soleil's Las Vegas Beatles stage revue, Love, George Martin and his son Giles remixed and blended 130 of the band's recordings to create what Martin called "a way of re-living the whole Beatles musical lifespan in a very condensed period". The show premiered in June 2006 and the Love album was released that November. In April 2009, Starr performed three songs with McCartney at a benefit concert held at New York's Radio City Music Hall and organised by McCartney.

On 9 September 2009, the Beatles' entire back catalogue was reissued following an extensive digital remastering process that lasted four years. Stereo editions of all twelve original UK studio albums, along with Magical Mystery Tour and the Past Masters compilation, were released on compact disc both individually and as a box set. A second collection, The Beatles in Mono, included remastered versions of every Beatles album released in true mono along with the original 1965 stereo mixes of Help! and Rubber Soul (both of which Martin had remixed for the 1987 editions). The Beatles: Rock Band, a music video game in the Rock Band series, was issued on the same day. In December 2009, the band's catalogue was officially released in FLAC and MP3 format in a limited edition of 30,000 USB flash drives.

==== 2010s ====
Owing to a long-running royalty disagreement, the Beatles were among the last major artists to sign deals with online music services. Residual disagreement emanating from Apple Corps' dispute with Apple, Inc., iTunes' owners, over the use of the name "Apple" was also partly responsible for the delay, although in 2008, McCartney stated that the main obstacle to making the Beatles' catalogue available online was that EMI "want[s] something we're not prepared to give them". In 2010, the official canon of thirteen Beatles studio albums, Past Masters and the "Red" and "Blue" greatest-hits albums were made available on iTunes.

In 2012, EMI's recorded music operations were sold to Universal Music Group. In order for Universal Music to acquire EMI, the European Union, for antitrust reasons, forced EMI to spin off assets including Parlophone. Universal was allowed to keep the Beatles' recorded music catalogue, managed by Capitol Records under its Capitol Music Group division. The entire original Beatles album catalogue was also reissued on vinyl in 2012, available either individually or as a box set.

In 2013, a second volume of BBC recordings, On Air – Live at the BBC Volume 2, was released. That December saw the release of another 59 Beatles recordings on iTunes. The set, The Beatles Bootleg Recordings 1963, had the opportunity to gain a 70-year copyright extension conditional on the songs being published at least once before the end of 2013. Apple Records released the recordings on 17 December to prevent them from going into the public domain and had them taken down from iTunes later that same day. Fan reactions to the release were mixed, with one blogger saying "the hardcore Beatles collectors who are trying to obtain everything will already have these."

On 26 January 2014, McCartney and Starr performed together at the 56th Annual Grammy Awards, held at the Staples Center in Los Angeles. The following day, The Night That Changed America: A Grammy Salute to the Beatles was taped in the Los Angeles Convention Center's West Hall. It aired on 9 February, the exact date of – and at the same time and on the same network as – the original broadcast of the Beatles' first US television appearance on The Ed Sullivan Show, 50 years earlier. The special included performances of Beatles songs by current artists as well as by McCartney and Starr, archival footage and interviews with the two surviving ex-Beatles carried out by David Letterman at the Ed Sullivan Theater. In December 2015, the Beatles released their catalogue for streaming on various streaming music services including Spotify and Apple Music.

Ron Howard's documentary The Beatles: Eight Days a Week was released in September 2016. It chronicled the Beatles' touring years, from their 1961 performances at the Cavern Club in Liverpool to their final commercial concert in San Francisco in 1966. The film was released theatrically on 15 September in the UK and the US, and started streaming on Hulu on 17 September. It received several awards and nominations, including for Best Documentary at the 70th British Academy Film Awards and the Outstanding Documentary or Nonfiction Special at the 69th Primetime Creative Arts Emmy Awards. An expanded, remixed and remastered version of The Beatles at the Hollywood Bowl was released on 9 September, to coincide with the release of the film.

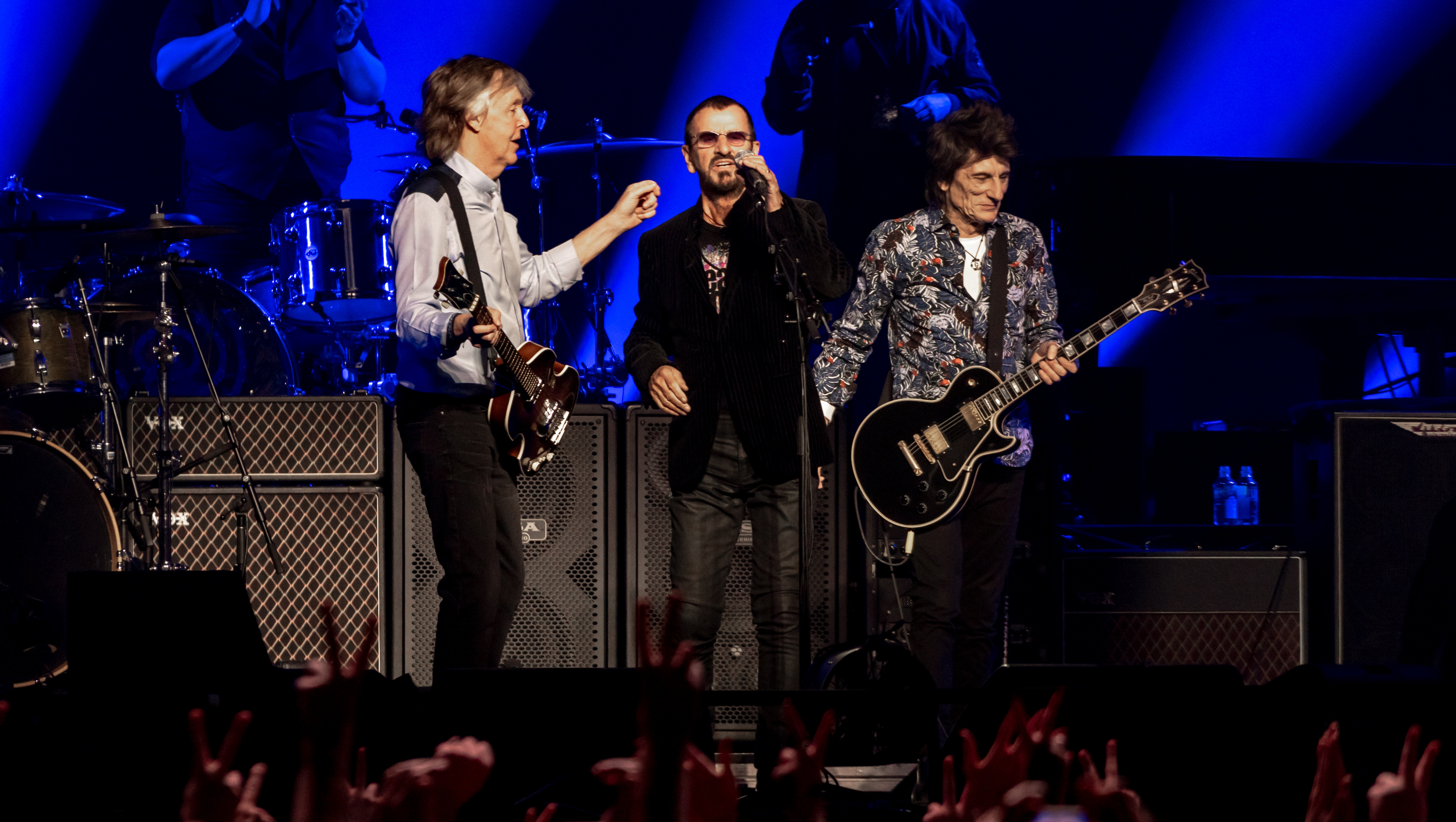
McCartney and Starr with Ronnie Wood in 2018

On 18 May 2017, Sirius XM Radio launched a 24/7 radio channel, The Beatles Channel. A week later, a special edition of Sgt. Pepper was reissued with new stereo mixes and unreleased material for the album's 50th anniversary. Similar box sets were released for The Beatles in November 2018, and Abbey Road in September 2019. In October 2019, Abbey Road returned to number one on the UK Albums Chart. The Beatles broke their own record for the album with the longest gap between topping the charts as Abbey Road hit the top spot 50 years after its original release.

==== 2020s ====
Peter Jackson's documentary The Beatles: Get Back, using footage captured for the Let It Be film, was released on Disney+ as a three-part miniseries in November 2021. A book by the same title was released on 12 October. A super deluxe version of Let It Be was released on 15 October. In January 2022, Get Back (Rooftop Performance), consisting of newly mixed audio of the Beatles' rooftop performance, was released on streaming services.

In 2022, McCartney and Starr collaborated on a new recording of "Let It Be" with Dolly Parton, Peter Frampton and Mick Fleetwood, which was released on Parton's album Rockstar in November 2023. In October 2022, a special edition of Revolver was released, featuring unreleased demos, studio outtakes, the original mono mix and a new stereo remix using AI de-mixing technology developed by Peter Jackson's WingNut Films. New music videos were produced for "Here, There and Everywhere" and "I'm Only Sleeping", the latter of which won the Grammy Award for Best Music Video at the 66th Annual Grammy Awards.

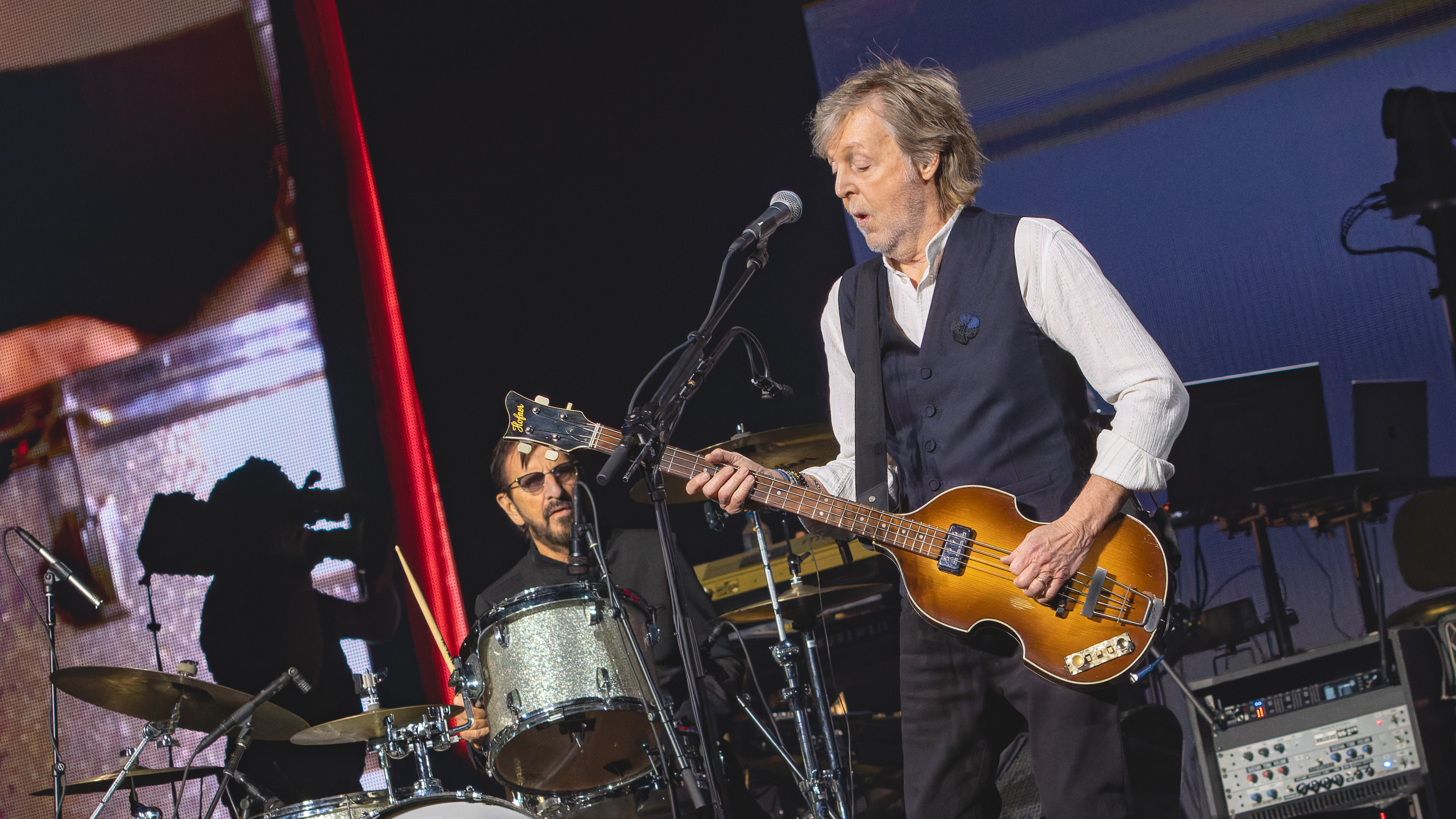
Starr joined McCartney's 19 December 2024 solo show as a guest performer for two Beatles songs.

In June 2023, McCartney announced plans to release "the final Beatles record" later that year, using Jackson's de-mixing technology to extract Lennon's voice from an old demo of a song that he had written as a solo artist. The song, "Now and Then", was released on 2 November 2023. Its official music video came out the following day, garnering upwards of 8 million views in its first 12 hours, as the song arrived on Spotify's rankings as one of the most-streamed current songs. "Now and Then" debuted simultaneously across music, alternative, news/talk and sports stations. The song's premiere achieved the record for the most radio stations to simulcast a music track. The song became their first UK number-one single since 1969. It won the Grammy Award for Best Rock Performance at the 67th Annual Grammy Awards, and was also nominated for Record of the Year. The nominations were also historically significant for making "Now and Then" the first AI-assisted track to be nominated for a Grammy award, and the first to win.

On 8 May 2024, the 1970 film Let It Be was released on Disney+, following a digital restoration by Jackson's Park Road Post; it was the first time it was publicly screened since its original theatrical release.

== Artistry ==
=== Development ===
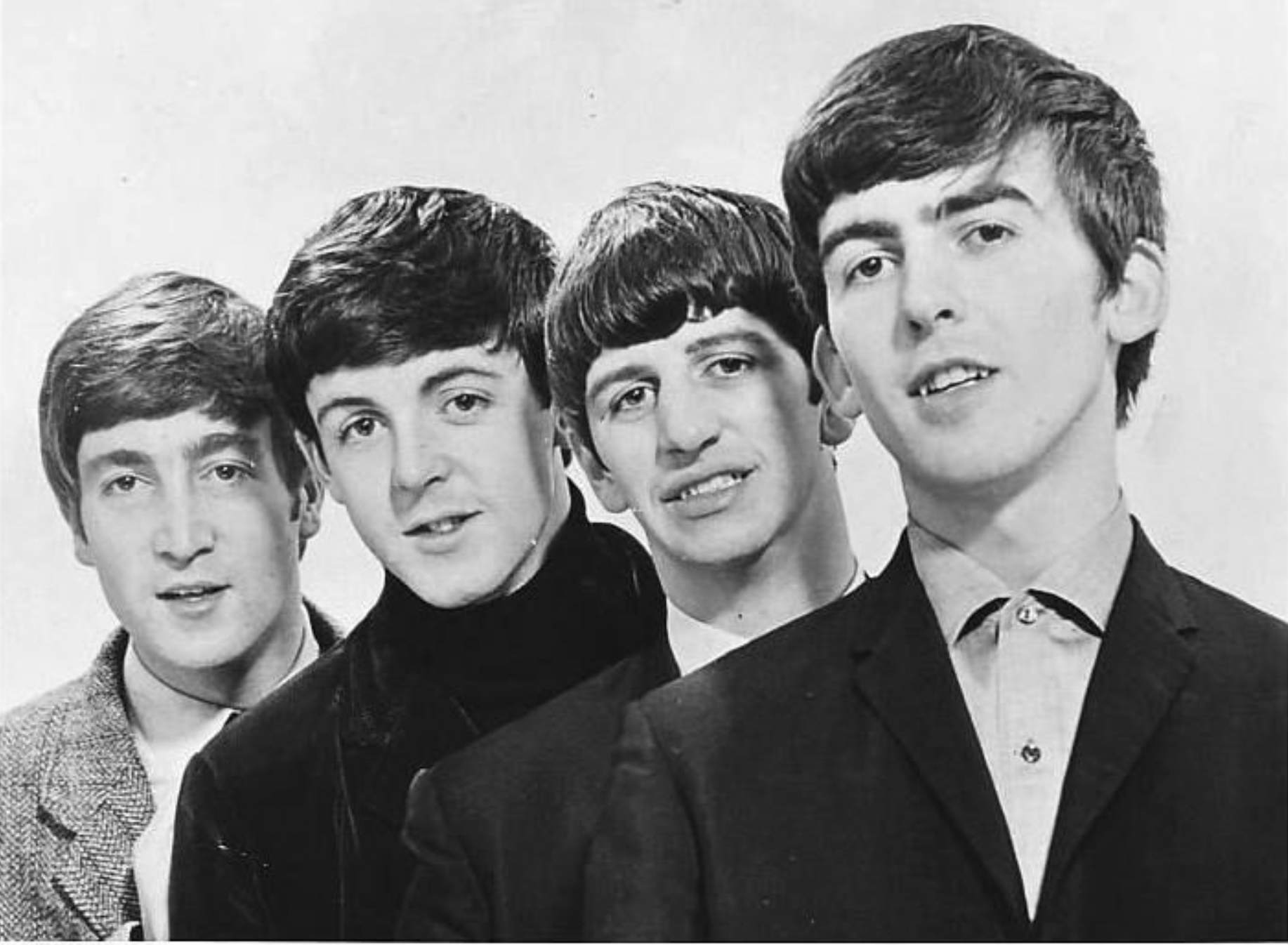
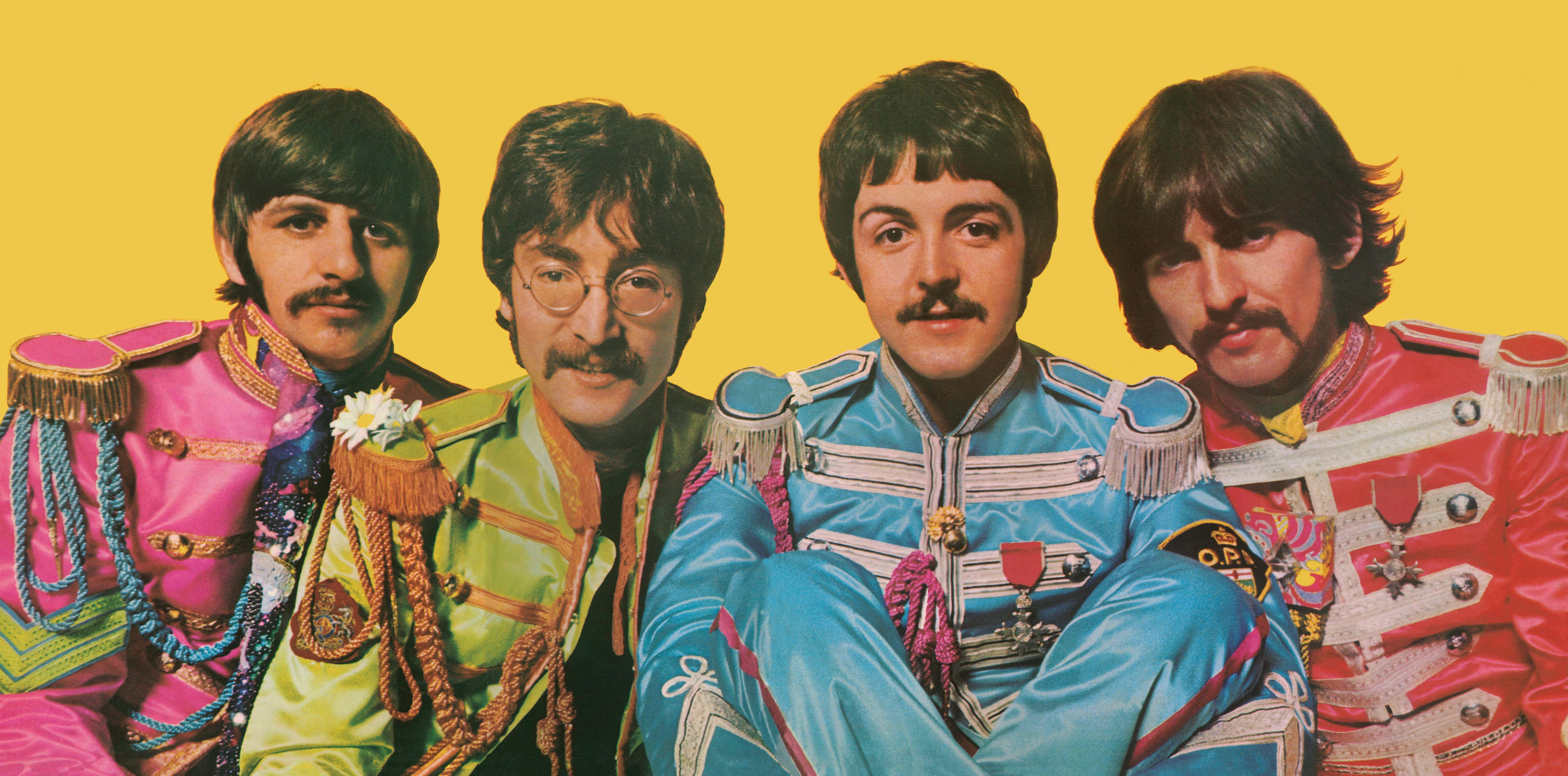
The Beatles in 1963 (top) and 1967 (bottom)

In Icons of Rock: An Encyclopedia of the Legends Who Changed Music Forever, Scott Schinder and Andy Schwartz describe the Beatles' musical evolution:

In their initial incarnation as cheerful, wisecracking moptops, the Fab Four revolutionised the sound, style, and attitude of popular music and opened rock and roll's doors to a tidal wave of British rock acts. Their initial impact would have been enough to establish the Beatles as one of their era's most influential cultural forces, but they didn't stop there. Although their initial style was a highly original, irresistibly catchy synthesis of early American rock and roll and R&B, the Beatles spent the rest of the 1960s expanding rock's stylistic frontiers, consistently staking out new musical territory on each release. The band's increasingly sophisticated experimentation encompassed a variety of genres, including folk-rock, country, psychedelia, and baroque pop, without sacrificing the effortless mass appeal of their early work.

In The Beatles as Musicians, Walter Everett describes Lennon and McCartney's contrasting motivations and approaches to composition: "McCartney may be said to have constantly developed – as a means to entertain – a focused musical talent with an ear for counterpoint and other aspects of craft in the demonstration of a universally agreed-upon common language that he did much to enrich. Conversely, Lennon's mature music is best appreciated as the daring product of a largely unconscious, searching but undisciplined artistic sensibility."

Ian MacDonald describes McCartney as "a natural melodist – a creator of tunes capable of existing apart from their harmony". His melody lines are characterised as primarily "vertical", employing wide, consonant intervals which express his "extrovert energy and optimism". Conversely, Lennon's "sedentary, ironic personality" is reflected in a "horizontal" approach featuring minimal, dissonant intervals and repetitive melodies which rely on their harmonic accompaniment for interest: "Basically a realist, he instinctively kept his melodies close to the rhythms and cadences of speech, colouring his lyrics with bluesy tone and harmony rather than creating tunes that made striking shapes of their own." MacDonald praises Harrison's lead guitar work for his "characterful lines and textural colourings" and describes Starr as "the father of modern pop/rock drumming".

=== Influences ===
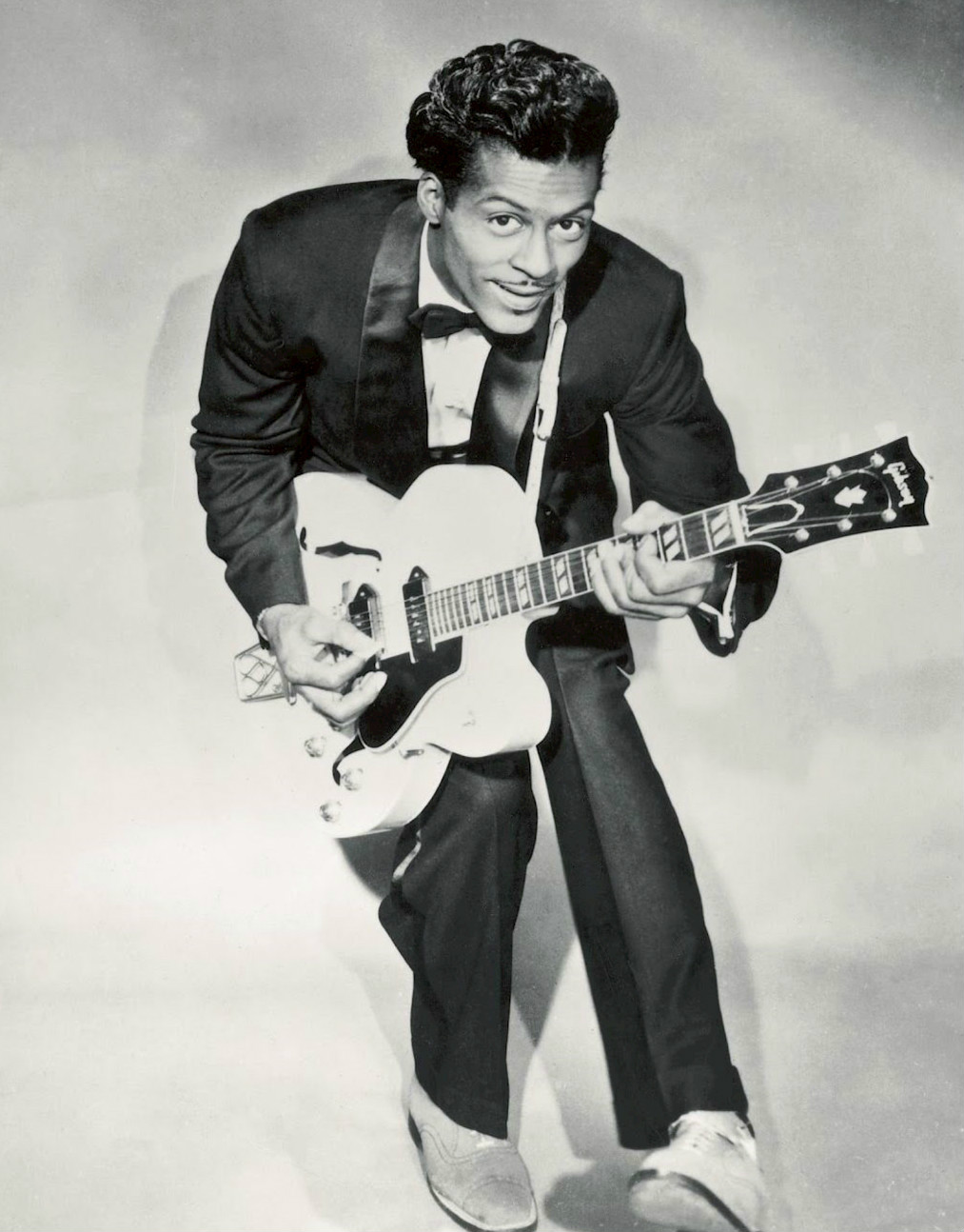
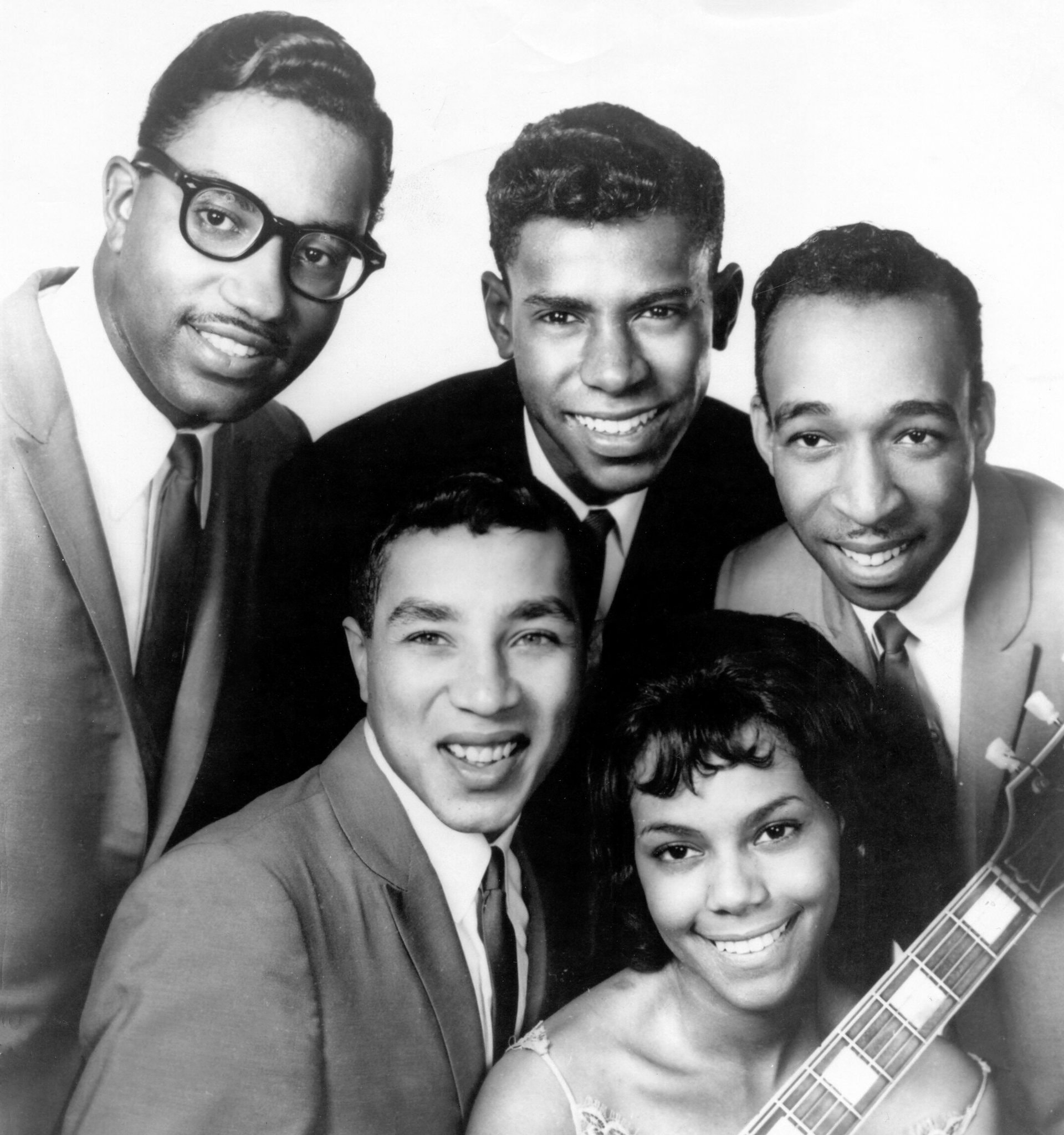
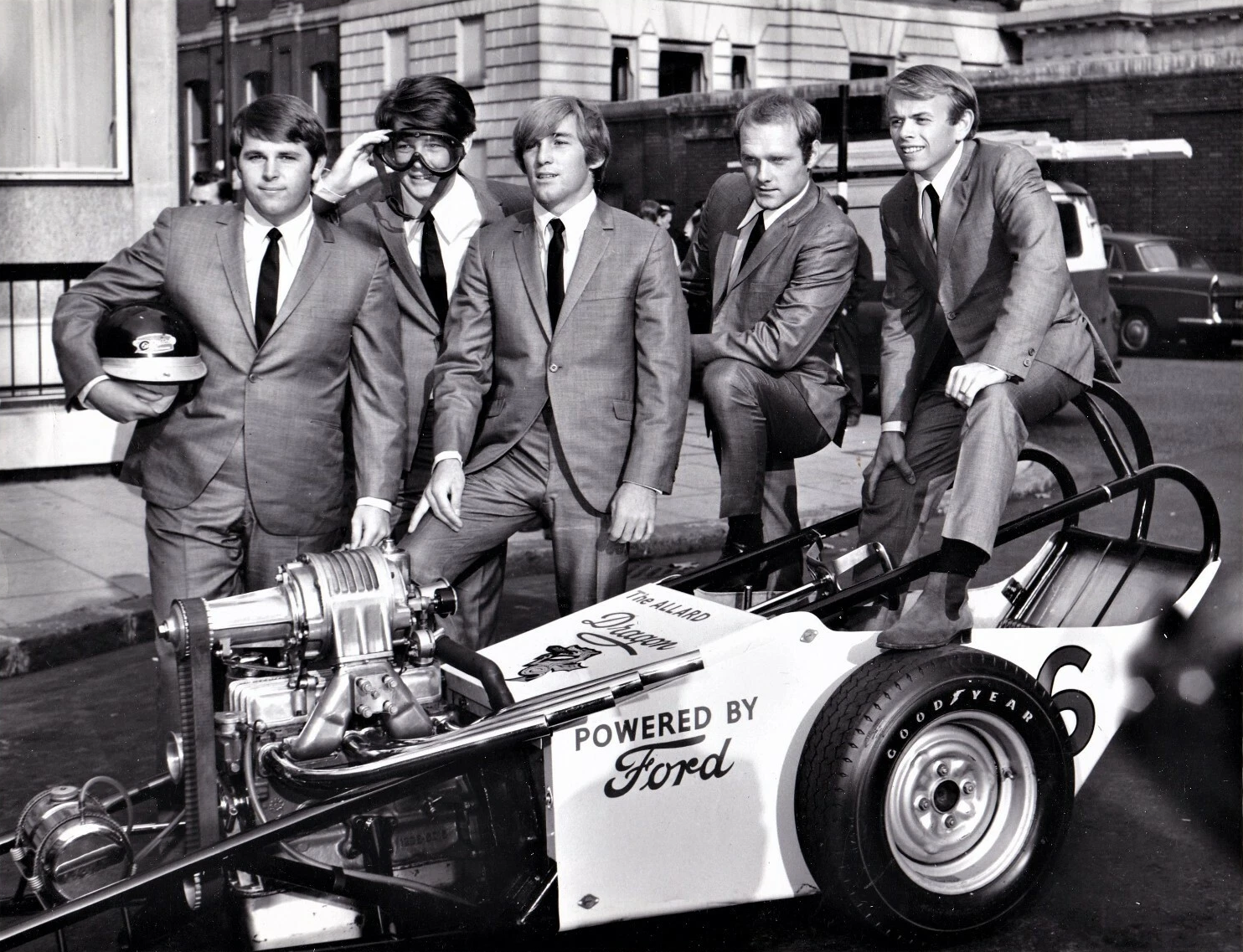
Chuck Berry, Smokey Robinson & the Miracles, the Beach Boys, and Bob Dylan (pictured clockwise) have all been credited as influences on the Beatles

The Beatles' earliest influences include Elvis Presley, Carl Perkins, Little Richard, Chuck Berry and Gene Vincent. During the Beatles' co-residency with Little Richard at the Star-Club in Hamburg, from April to May 1962, he advised them on the proper technique for performing his songs. Of Presley, Lennon said, "Nothing really affected me until I heard Elvis. If there hadn't been Elvis, there would not have been the Beatles." Chuck Berry was particularly influential in terms of lyrics. Lennon noted, "He was well advanced of his time lyric-wise. We all owe a lot to him." Other early influences include Buddy Holly, Eddie Cochran, Roy Orbison, the Everly Brothers and Jerry Lee Lewis.

The Beatles continued to absorb influences long after their initial success, finding new musical and lyrical avenues from their contemporaries, including Bob Dylan, Smokey Robinson and the Miracles, the Who, Frank Zappa, the Lovin' Spoonful, the Byrds and the Beach Boys, whose 1966 album Pet Sounds amazed and inspired McCartney. Referring to the Beach Boys' creative leader, Martin later stated: "No one made a greater impact on the Beatles than Brian [Wilson]." Ravi Shankar, with whom Harrison studied for six weeks in India in late 1966, had a significant effect on his musical development during the band's later years. McCartney said "Bach was always one of our favourite composers"; his influence can be heard in "In My Life", "Penny Lane" and "Blackbird".

=== Genres ===
Originating as a skiffle group, the Beatles quickly embraced 1950s rock and roll and helped pioneer the Merseybeat genre, and their repertoire ultimately expanded to include a broad variety of pop music. Reflecting the range of styles they explored, Lennon said of Beatles for Sale, "You could call our new one a Beatles country-and-western LP", while Gould credits Rubber Soul as "the instrument by which legions of folk-music enthusiasts were coaxed into the camp of pop".

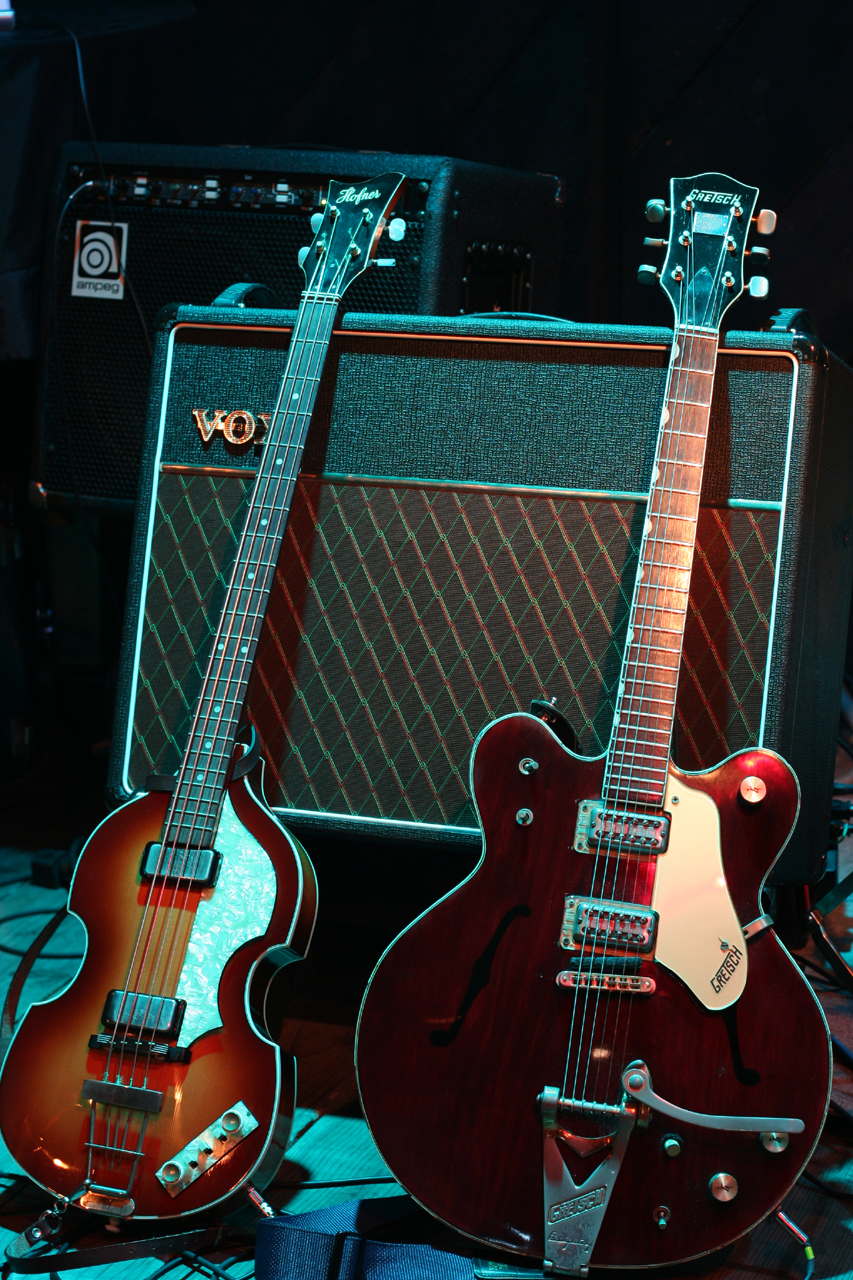
A Höfner "violin" bass guitar and Gretsch Country Gentleman guitar, models played by McCartney and Harrison, respectively; the Vox AC30 amplifier behind them is the model the Beatles used during performances in the early 1960s.

Although "Yesterday" was not the first pop record to employ orchestral strings, it marked the group's first recorded use of classical music elements. Gould observes, "The more traditional sound of strings allowed for a fresh appreciation of their talent as composers by listeners who were otherwise allergic to the din of drums and electric guitars." They continued to experiment with string arrangements to various effect; Sgt. Pepper's "She's Leaving Home", for instance, is "cast in the mold of a sentimental Victorian ballad", Gould writes, "its words and music filled with the clichés of musical melodrama".

The band's stylistic range expanded in another direction with their 1966 B-side "Rain", described by Martin Strong as "the first overtly psychedelic Beatles record". Other psychedelic numbers followed, such as "Tomorrow Never Knows" (recorded before "Rain"), "Strawberry Fields Forever", "Lucy in the Sky with Diamonds" and "I Am the Walrus". The influence of Indian classical music was evident in Harrison's "The Inner Light", "Love You To" and "Within You Without You" – Gould describes the latter two as attempts "to replicate the raga form in miniature".

Innovation was the most striking feature of their creative evolution, according to music historian and pianist Michael Campbell:

"A Day in the Life" encapsulates the art and achievement of the Beatles as well as any single track can. It highlights key features of their music: the sound imagination, the persistence of tuneful melody and the close coordination between words and music. It represents a new category of song – more sophisticated than pop ... and uniquely innovative. There literally had never before been a song – classical or vernacular – that had blended so many disparate elements so imaginatively.

Philosophy professor Bruce Ellis Benson agrees: "The Beatles ... give us a wonderful example of how such far-ranging influences as Celtic music, rhythm and blues, and country and western could be put together in a new way."

Author Dominic Pedler describes the way they crossed musical styles:

Far from moving sequentially from one genre to another (as is sometimes conveniently suggested) the group maintained in parallel their mastery of the traditional, catchy chart hit while simultaneously forging rock and dabbling with a wide range of peripheral influences from country to vaudeville. One of these threads was their take on folk music, which would form such essential groundwork for their later collisions with Indian music and philosophy.

As the personal relationships between the band members grew increasingly strained, their individual tastes became more apparent. The minimalistic cover artwork for the White Album contrasted with the complexity and diversity of its music, which encompassed Lennon's "Revolution 9" (whose musique concrète approach was influenced by Yoko Ono), Starr's country song "Don't Pass Me By", Harrison's rock ballad "While My Guitar Gently Weeps" and the "proto-metal roar" of McCartney's "Helter Skelter".

=== Contribution of George Martin ===
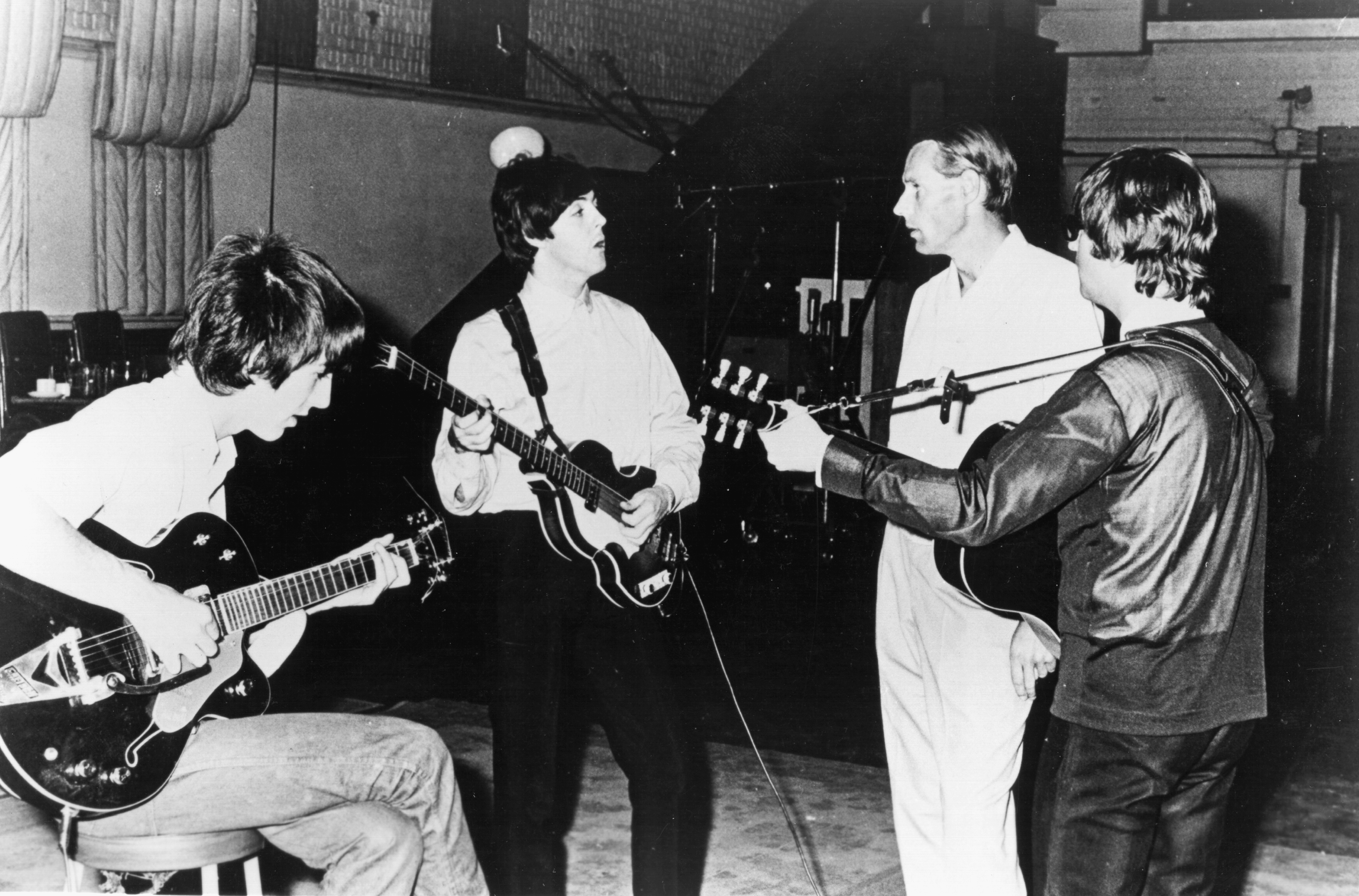
George Martin (second from right) in the studio with the Beatles in the mid-1960s

George Martin's close involvement in his role as producer made him one of the leading candidates for the informal title of the "fifth Beatle". He applied his classical musical training in various ways and functioned as "an informal music teacher" to the progressing songwriters, according to Gould. Martin suggested to a sceptical McCartney that the arrangement of "Yesterday" should feature a string quartet accompaniment, thereby introducing the Beatles to a "hitherto unsuspected world of classical instrumental colour", in MacDonald's description. Their creative development was also facilitated by Martin's willingness to experiment in response to their suggestions, such as adding "something baroque" to a particular recording. In addition to scoring orchestral arrangements for recordings, Martin often performed on them, playing instruments including piano, organ and brass.

Collaborating with Lennon and McCartney required Martin to adapt to their different approaches to songwriting and recording. MacDonald comments, "while [he] worked more naturally with the conventionally articulate McCartney, the challenge of catering to Lennon's intuitive approach generally spurred him to his more original arrangements". Martin said of the two composers' distinct songwriting styles and his stabilising influence:

Compared with Paul's songs, all of which seemed to keep in some sort of touch with reality, John's had a psychedelic, almost mystical quality ... John's imagery is one of the best things about his work – 'tangerine trees', 'marmalade skies', 'cellophane flowers' ... I always saw him as an aural Salvador Dalí, rather than some drug-ridden record artist. On the other hand, I would be stupid to pretend that drugs didn't figure quite heavily in the Beatles' lives at that time ... they knew that I, in my schoolmasterly role, didn't approve ... Not only was I not into it myself, I couldn't see the need for it; and there's no doubt that, if I too had been on dope, Pepper would never have been the album it was. Perhaps it was the combination of dope and no dope that worked, who knows?

Harrison echoed Martin's description of his stabilising role:

I think we just grew through those years together, him as the straight man and us as the loonies; but he was always there for us to interpret our madness – we used to be slightly avant-garde on certain days of the week, and he would be there as the anchor person, to communicate that through the engineers and on to the tape.

=== In the studio ===
Making innovative use of technology while expanding the possibilities of recorded music, the Beatles urged experimentation by Martin and his recording engineers. Seeking ways to put chance occurrences to creative use, the band might incorporate accidental guitar feedback, a resonating glass bottle, or a tape loaded the wrong way round so that it played backwards into their music. Their desire to create new sounds on every new recording, combined with Martin's arranging abilities and the studio expertise of EMI staff engineers Norman Smith, Ken Townsend and Geoff Emerick, all contributed significantly to their records from Rubber Soul and, especially, Revolver onwards.

Along with innovative studio techniques such as sound effects, unconventional microphone placements, tape loops, double tracking and vari-speed recording, the Beatles augmented their songs with instruments that were unconventional in rock music at the time. These included string and brass ensembles as well as Indian instruments such as the sitar in "Norwegian Wood" and the swarmandal in "Strawberry Fields Forever". They also used novel electronic instruments such as the Mellotron, with which McCartney supplied the flute voices on the "Strawberry Fields Forever" intro, and the clavioline, an electronic keyboard that created the unusual oboe-like sound on "Baby, You're a Rich Man".

== Legacy ==
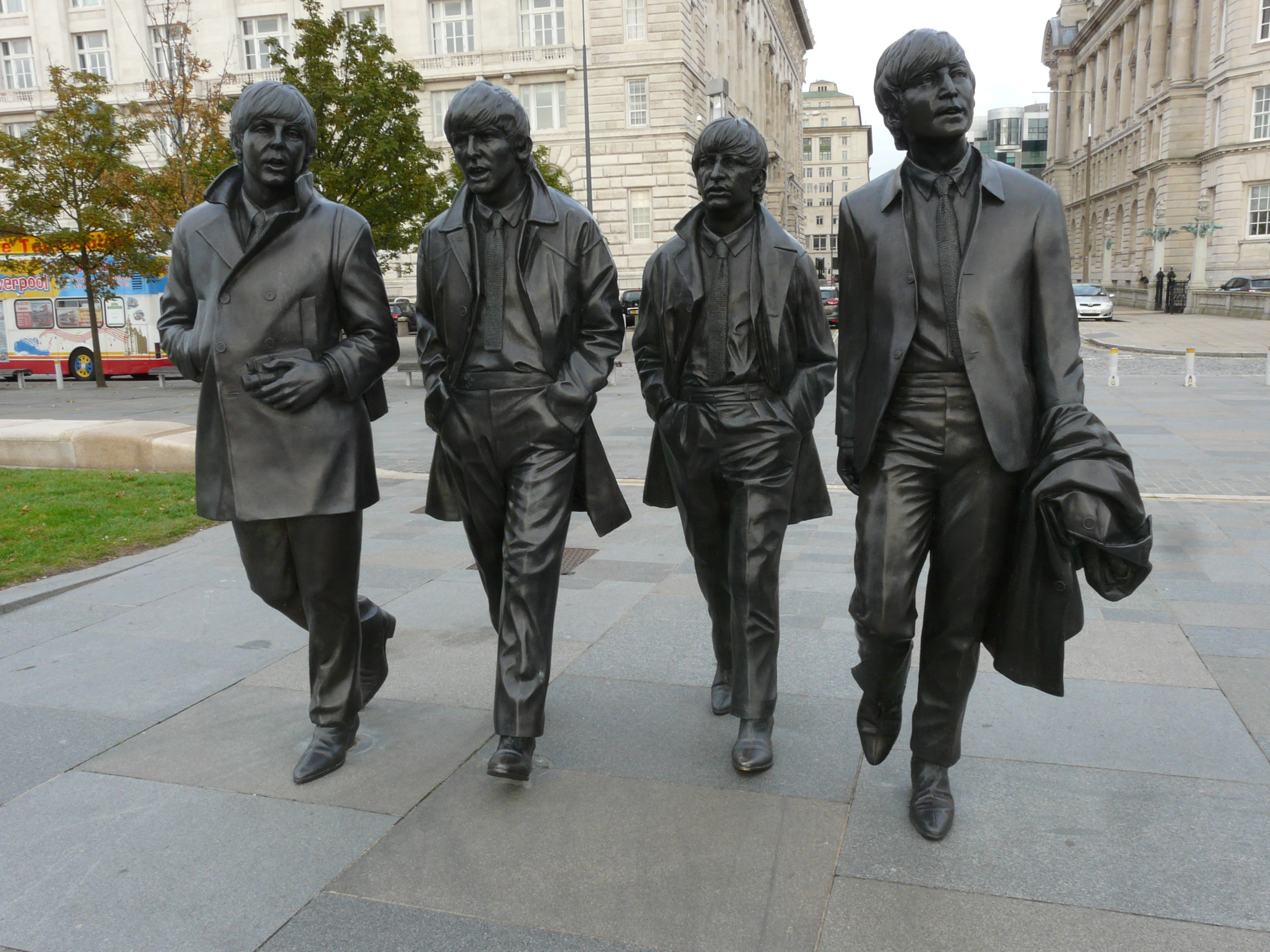
The Beatles statue at Pier Head in Liverpool, their home city

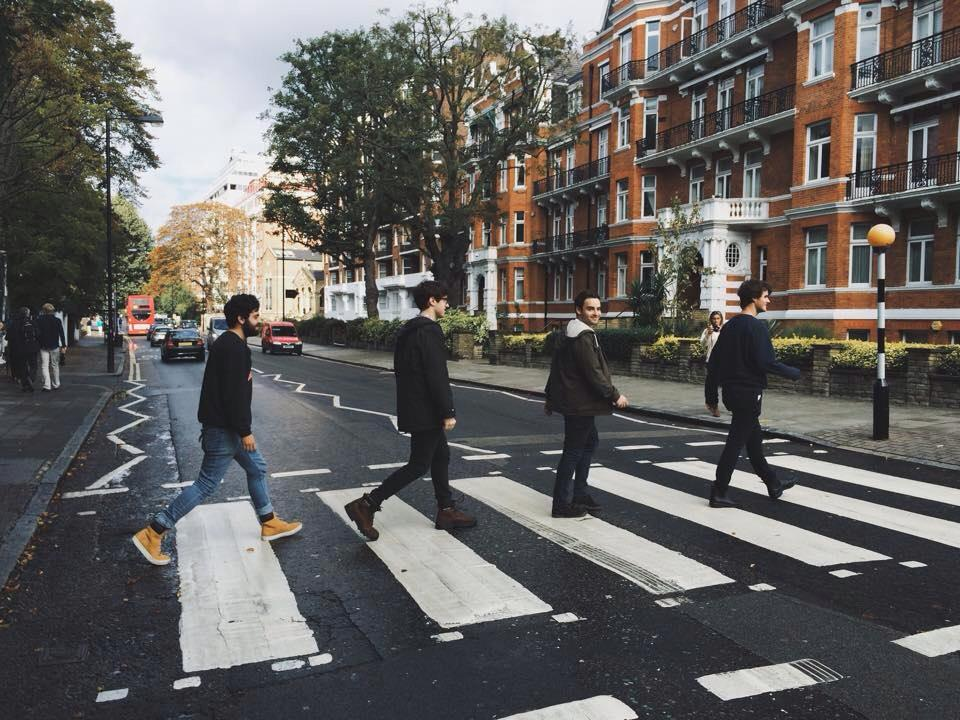
Abbey Road crossing in London is a popular destination for Beatles fans. In December 2010, it was given grade II listed status for its "cultural and historical importance"; the Abbey Road studios themselves had been given similar status earlier in the year.

Former Rolling Stone magazine associate editor Robert Greenfield compared the Beatles to Picasso, as "artists who broke through the constraints of their time period to come up with something that was unique and original ... [I]n the form of popular music, no one will ever be more revolutionary, more creative and more distinctive ..." The British poet Philip Larkin described their work as "an enchanting and intoxicating hybrid of Negro rock-and-roll with their own adolescent romanticism" and "the first advance in popular music since the War".

The Beatles' arrival in the US in 1964 is credited with initiating the album era; the music historian Joel Whitburn says that LP sales soon "exploded and eventually outpaced the sales and releases of singles" in the music industry. They not only sparked the British Invasion of the US, they became a globally influential phenomenon. From the 1920s, the US had dominated popular entertainment culture throughout much of the world, via Hollywood films, jazz, the music of Broadway and Tin Pan Alley, and later, the rock and roll that first emerged in Memphis, Tennessee. The Beatles are regarded as British cultural icons, with young adults from abroad naming the band among a group of people whom they most associated with UK culture.

Their musical innovations and commercial success inspired musicians worldwide. Many artists have acknowledged the Beatles' influence and enjoyed chart success with covers of their songs. On radio, their arrival marked the beginning of a new era; in 1968, the programme director of New York's WABC radio station forbade his DJs from playing any "pre-Beatles" music, marking the defining line of what would be considered oldies on American radio. They helped to redefine the album as something more than just a few hits padded out with "filler", and they were primary innovators of the modern music video. The Shea Stadium show with which they opened their 1965 North American tour attracted an estimated 55,600 people, then the largest audience in concert history; Spitz describes the event as a "major breakthrough ... a giant step toward reshaping the concert business". Emulation of their clothing and especially their hairstyles, which became a mark of rebellion, had a global impact on fashion.

According to Gould, the Beatles changed the way people listened to popular music and experienced its role in their lives. From what began as the Beatlemania fad, the group's popularity grew into what was seen as an embodiment of sociocultural movements of the decade. As icons of the 1960s counterculture, Gould continues, they became a catalyst for bohemianism and activism in various social and political arenas, fuelling movements such as women's liberation, gay liberation and environmentalism. According to Peter Lavezzoli, after the "more popular than Jesus" controversy in 1966, the Beatles felt considerable pressure to say the right things and "began a concerted effort to spread a message of wisdom and higher consciousness".

Other commentators such as Mikal Gilmore and Todd Leopold have traced the inception of their sociocultural impact earlier, interpreting even the Beatlemania period, particularly on their first visit to the US, as a key moment in the development of generational awareness. Referring to their appearance on The Ed Sullivan Show, Leopold states: "In many ways, the Sullivan appearance marked the beginning of a cultural revolution ... The Beatles were like aliens dropped into the United States of 1964." According to Gilmore:

Elvis Presley had shown us how rebellion could be fashioned into eye-opening style; the Beatles were showing us how style could have the impact of cultural revelation – or at least how a pop vision might be forged into an unimpeachable consensus.

Established in 2009, Global Beatles Day is an annual holiday on 25 June each year that celebrates the ideals of the Beatles. The date was chosen to commemorate the date the group participated in the BBC programme Our World in 1967, performing "All You Need Is Love" broadcast to an international audience.

== Awards and achievements ==
In 1965, Queen Elizabeth II appointed Lennon, McCartney, Harrison and Starr Members of the Order of the British Empire (MBE). The recipients of nine Grammy Awards and fifteen Ivor Novello Awards, the Beatles have six Diamond albums, as well as 20 Multi-Platinum albums, 16 Platinum albums and six Gold albums in the US. In the UK, the Beatles have four Multi-Platinum albums, four Platinum albums, eight Gold albums and one Silver album. They were inducted into the Rock and Roll Hall of Fame in their first year of eligibility, 1988.

The best-selling music act in history, the Beatles have sold more than 600 million units as of 2012. (Note: Another estimate gives total international sales of over 1 billion units, a figure based on EMI's statement and recognised by Guinness World Records.) From 1991 to 2009, the Beatles sold 57 million albums in the United States, according to Nielsen Soundscan. They have sold more singles in the UK (21.9 million) than any other act, and held the record for the most number-one albums on the UK charts (15) until Robbie Williams surpassed them in 2026. They ranked number one on Billboard magazine's list of the all-time most successful Hot 100 artists, released in 2008 to celebrate the US singles chart's 50th anniversary. As of 2017, they hold the record for most number-one hits on the Billboard Hot 100, with 20. The Recording Industry Association of America certifies that the Beatles have sold 183 million units in the US, more than any other artist. They were collectively included in Time magazine's compilation of the 20th century's 100 most influential people. In 2014, they received the Grammy Lifetime Achievement Award. In 2007, the Beatles became the first band to feature on a series of UK postage stamps issued by the Royal Mail. Earlier in 1999, the United States Postal Service issued a stamp dedicated to the Beatles and Yellow Submarine.

In 2004 and 2011, Rolling Stone named them the greatest artist of all time. Elvis Costello wrote in appreciation:

The word 'Beatlesque' has been in the dictionary for a while now. I can hear them in the Prince album Around the World in a Day; in Ron Sexsmith's tunes; in Harry Nilsson's melodies. You can hear that Kurt Cobain listened to the Beatles and mixed them in with punk and metal. You probably wouldn't be listening to the ambition of the latest OutKast record if the Beatles hadn't made the White Album into a double LP!

I've co-written some songs with Paul McCartney and performed with him in concert on a few occasions. During one rehearsal, I was singing harmony on a Ricky Nelson song, and Paul called out the next tune: 'All My Loving.' I said, 'Do you want me to take the harmony line the second time round?' And he said, 'Yeah, give it a try.' I'd only had 35 years to learn the part. It was a very poignant performance, witnessed only by the crew and other artists on the bill.

At the show, it was very different. The second he sang the opening lines – 'Close your eyes, and I'll kiss you' – the crowd's reaction was so intense that it all but drowned the song out. It was very thrilling but also rather disconcerting. Perhaps I understood in that moment one of the reasons why the Beatles had to stop performing. The songs weren't theirs anymore. They were everybody's.

== Members ==
Principal members

- John Lennon – vocals, guitars, keyboards, harmonica, bass (1960–1969; died 1980)
- Paul McCartney – vocals, bass, guitars, keyboards, drums (1960–1970)
- George Harrison – guitars, vocals, sitar, keyboards, bass (1960–1970; died 2001)
- Ringo Starr – drums, percussion, vocals (1962–1970)

Early members

- Stuart Sutcliffe – bass, vocals (1960–1961; died 1962)
- Pete Best – drums, vocals (1960–1962)

Temporary members

- Tommy Moore (died 1981) and Norman Chapman (died 1995) preceded Best as temporary drummers in the Silver Beetles/Beatles before Best joined in August 1960.
- Chas Newby (died 2023) performed bass with the Beatles for a short span of live shows in December 1960, filling in for Sutcliffe when he remained in Hamburg.
- Jimmie Nicol temporarily replaced Starr in June 1964 for five dates of the Beatles' 1964 world tour.
- Billy Preston (died 2006) played keyboards with the Beatles during 1969.

== Discography ==
The Beatles' core catalogue consists of the original 12 UK studio albums, Magical Mystery Tour (a US album which was brought into the core catalogue in the 1980s when their discography was standardised for compact disc) and Past Masters, a compilation album which collects all the UK non-album singles and EP tracks not released on the previously mentioned 13 releases. (Note: The Past Masters compilation of singles and EP tracks was originally released as two separate albums, Volumes One and Two in 1988. However, they were later merged into one compilation.)

- Please Please Me (1963)
- With the Beatles (1963)
- A Hard Day's Night (1964)
- Beatles for Sale (1964)
- Help! (1965)
- Rubber Soul (1965)
- Revolver (1966)
- Sgt. Pepper's Lonely Hearts Club Band (1967)
- Magical Mystery Tour (1967)
- The Beatles ("the White Album") (1968)
- Yellow Submarine (1969)
- Abbey Road (1969)
- Let It Be (1970)
- Past Masters (1988, compilation)

== Song catalogue ==
Until 1969, the Beatles' catalogue was published almost exclusively by Northern Songs, formed in February 1963 by music publisher Dick James specifically for Lennon and McCartney, though it later acquired songs by other artists. The company was organised with James and his partner, Emmanuel Silver, owning a controlling interest, variously described as 51% or 50% plus one share. McCartney had 20%. Reports again vary concerning Lennon's portion – 19 or 20% – and Brian Epstein's – 9 or 10% – which he received in lieu of a 25% band management fee. In 1965, the company went public; 5 million shares were created, of which the original principals retained 3.75 million. James and Silver each received 937,500 shares (18.75% of 5 million); Lennon and McCartney each received 750,000 shares (15%); and Epstein's management company, NEMS Enterprises, received 375,000 shares (7.5%). Of the 1.25 million shares put up for sale, Harrison and Starr each acquired 40,000. At the time of the stock offering, Lennon and McCartney renewed their three-year publishing contracts, binding them to Northern Songs until 1973.

Harrison created Harrisongs to represent his Beatles compositions, but signed a three-year contract with Northern Songs that gave it the copyright to his work until March 1968, which included "Taxman" and "Within You Without You". The songs on which Starr received co-writing credit before 1968, such as "What Goes On" and "Flying", were also Northern Songs copyrights. Harrison did not renew his contract with Northern Songs when it ended, signing instead with Apple Publishing while retaining the copyright to his work from that point on. Harrison thus owned the rights to his later Beatles songs such as "While My Guitar Gently Weeps" and "Something". That year, as well, Starr created Startling Music, which holds the rights to his Beatles compositions, "Don't Pass Me By" and "Octopus's Garden".

In March 1969, James arranged to sell his and his partner's shares of Northern Songs to the British broadcasting company Associated Television (ATV), founded by impresario Lew Grade, without first informing the Beatles. The band then made a bid to gain a controlling interest by attempting to work out a deal with a consortium of London brokerage firms that had accumulated a 14% holding. The deal collapsed over the objections of Lennon, who declared, "I'm sick of being fucked about by men in suits sitting on their fat arses in the City". By the end of May, ATV had acquired a majority stake in Northern Songs, controlling nearly the entire Lennon–McCartney catalogue, as well as any future material until 1973. In frustration, Lennon and McCartney sold their shares to ATV in late October 1969.

In 1981, financial losses by ATV's parent company, Associated Communications Corporation (ACC), led it to attempt to sell its music division. According to authors Brian Southall and Rupert Perry, Grade contacted McCartney, offering ATV Music and Northern Songs for $30 million. According to an account McCartney gave in 1995, he met with Grade and explained he was interested solely in the Northern Songs catalogue if Grade were ever willing to "separate off" that portion of ATV Music. Soon afterwards, Grade offered to sell him Northern Songs for £20 million, giving the ex-Beatle "a week or so" to decide. By McCartney's account, he and Ono countered with a £5 million bid that was rejected. According to reports at the time, Grade refused to separate Northern Songs and turned down an offer of £21–25 million from McCartney and Ono for Northern Songs. In 1982, ACC was acquired in a takeover by Australian business magnate Robert Holmes à Court for £60 million.

In 1985, Michael Jackson purchased ATV for a reported $47.5 million. The acquisition gave him control over the publishing rights to more than 200 Beatles songs, as well as 40,000 other copyrights. In 1995, in a deal that earned him a reported $110 million, Jackson merged his music publishing business with Sony, creating a new company, Sony/ATV Music Publishing, in which he held a 50% stake. The merger made the new company, then valued at over half a billion dollars, the third-largest music publisher in the world. In 2016, Sony acquired Jackson's share of Sony/ATV from the Jackson estate for $750 million.

Despite the lack of publishing rights to most of their songs, Lennon's estate and McCartney continue to receive their respective shares of the writers' royalties, which together are 33 1/3% of total commercial proceeds in the US and which vary elsewhere around the world between 50 and 55%. Two of Lennon and McCartney's earliest songs – "Love Me Do" and "P.S. I Love You" – were published by an EMI subsidiary, Ardmore & Beechwood, before they signed with James. McCartney acquired their publishing rights from Ardmore in 1978, and they are the only two Beatles songs owned by McCartney's company MPL Communications. On 18 January 2017, McCartney filed a suit in the United States district court against Sony/ATV Music Publishing seeking to reclaim ownership of his share of the Lennon–McCartney song catalogue beginning in 2018. Under US copyright law, for works published before 1978, the author can reclaim copyrights assigned to a publisher after 56 years. McCartney and Sony agreed to a confidential settlement in June 2017.

== Selected filmography ==
Fictionalised

- A Hard Day's Night (1964)
- Help! (1965)
- Magical Mystery Tour (1967)
- Yellow Submarine (1968) (brief cameo)

Documentaries and filmed performances

- The Beatles at Shea Stadium (1966)
- Let It Be (1970)
- The Compleat Beatles (1982)
- It Was Twenty Years Ago Today (1987) (about Sgt. Pepper)
- The Beatles Anthology (1995)
- The Beatles: 1+ (2015) (collection of digitally restored music videos)
- The Beatles: Eight Days a Week (2016) (about Beatlemania and touring years)
- The Beatles: Get Back (2021)
- Now and Then: The Last Beatles Song (2023) (short film about the creation of "Now and Then")
- Beatles '64 (2024) (about the cultural impact of the Beatles' first US visit in 1964)

== Concert tours ==
Headlining

- 1963 UK tours (winter–autumn)
- Autumn 1963 Sweden tour
- Winter 1964 North American tour
- Spring 1964 UK tour
- 1964 world tour
- 1964 North American tour
- 1965 European tour
- 1965 US tour
- 1965 UK tour
- 1966 tour of Germany, Japan and the Philippines
- 1966 US tour

Co-headlining

- Winter 1963 Helen Shapiro Tour
- Spring 1963 Tommy Roe/Chris Montez UK tour
- Roy Orbison/The Beatles Tour

== See also ==
- The Beatles timeline
- Grammy Award records – most Grammys won by a group
- List of British Grammy Award winners and nominees
- List of songs recorded by the Beatles
- Outline of the Beatles
