= Live! at the Star-Club in Hamburg, Germany; 1962 =

1977 live album by the Beatles

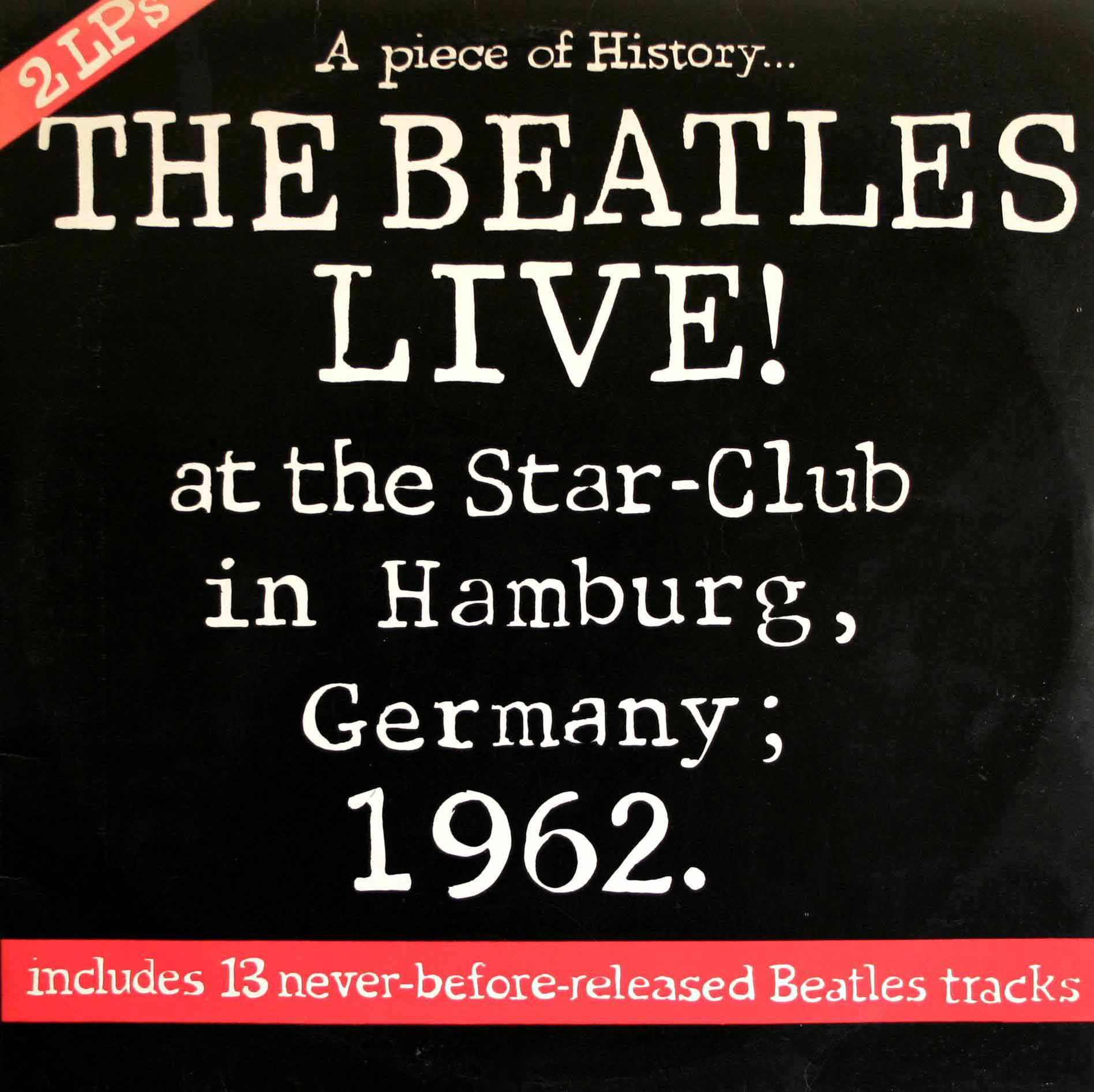

Live album by the Beatles
- Released: 27 May 1977
- Recorded: Late December 1962
- Venue: Star-Club, Hamburg, West Germany
- Genre: Rock and roll
- Length: 60:01
- Label: Lingasong/Bellaphon (GER)
- Producer: Larry Grossberg

The Beatles chronology
The Beatles at the Hollywood Bowl (1977)	Live! at the Star-Club in Hamburg, Germany; 1962 (1977)	Love Songs (1977)

Live! at the Star-Club in Hamburg, Germany; 1962 is a double album featuring live performances by the English rock band the Beatles, recorded in late December 1962 at the Star-Club during their final Hamburg residency. The album was released in 1977 in two different versions, comprising a total of 30 songs by the Beatles.

The performances were recorded on a home tape machine using a single microphone, resulting in a low fidelity recording. Ted "Kingsize" Taylor began to investigate possible marketing of the tapes in 1973. They were eventually bought by Paul Murphy and subjected to extensive audio processing to improve the sound, leading to the 1977 album.

Although the poor sound quality limits its commercial appeal, the album provides historic insight into the group's club act in the period after Ringo Starr joined but before the emergence of Beatlemania. The Beatles were unsuccessful in legally blocking the initial release of the album and the recordings were reissued in many forms until 1998, when the group was awarded full rights to the performances.

== History ==
=== Background ===
The Beatles' five residencies in Hamburg during 1960 to 1962 allowed the Liverpool band to develop their performance skills and widen their reputation. Drummer Pete Best was added to the band in August 1960 to secure their first Hamburg booking, during which they played for 48 nights at the Indra Club and then 58 nights at the Kaiserkeller. The Beatles returned to Hamburg in April 1961 to play at the Top Ten Club for three months.

A new Hamburg music venue, the Star-Club, opened on 13 April 1962, with the Beatles booked for the first seven weeks. The Beatles returned to Hamburg in November and December 1962 for their fourth and fifth engagements there, which had been booked for the Star-Club many months in advance. Unlike their previous three trips to Hamburg, their drummer was Ringo Starr, having replaced Best in August. The Beatles were reluctant to return for their final two-week booking, which started 18 December, as they were gaining popularity in Britain and had just achieved their first charted single with "Love Me Do".

=== Recording ===
Portions of the Beatles' final Star-Club performances (along with other acts) were recorded by the club's stage manager, Adrian Barber, for Ted "Kingsize" Taylor. Barber used a Grundig home reel-to-reel recorder at a tape speed of 3¾ inches per second, with a single microphone placed in front of the stage. Taylor, leader of the Dominoes (who were also playing at the club), said that John Lennon verbally agreed to the group being recorded in exchange for Taylor providing the beer during their performances.

The tapes were originally described as having been recorded in the spring of 1962, an attempt to pre-date the Beatles' June 1962 contract signing with Parlophone. However, song arrangements and dialogue from the tapes pointed to late December 1962, and a recording date of 31 December 1962 (the group's last day in Hamburg) was commonly cited. Later researchers have proposed that the tapes are from multiple days during the last week of December; Allan Williams (The Beatles' booking agent at the time) recalled that a total of about three hours was recorded over three or four sessions between Christmas and New Year's Day.

"Mr. Moonlight"
Sample of the Star-Club performance of "Mr. Moonlight", with Lennon's altered lyric

"Roll Over Beethoven"
Sample of the "breakneck pace" performance of "Roll Over Beethoven" at the Star-Club

The tapes captured the Beatles performing at least 33 different titles, plus some repeated songs. Of the 30 songs that were commercially released from the tapes, only two were Lennon–McCartney compositions. The others were an assortment of cover versions, 17 of which would be re-made by the Beatles and appear on their various studio albums or Live at the BBC. The arrangements played at the Star-Club are similar to the versions recorded later, albeit less refined, although there are a few cases with distinct differences. For example, "Mr. Moonlight" has a much quicker tempo, a guitar-based instrumental break, and an intentionally altered lyric with Lennon proclaiming he is on his "nose" instead of his "knees"; "Roll Over Beethoven" was described as "never taken at a more breakneck pace".

The recording equipment and method resulted in the tapes being unmistakably low fidelity. The vocals, even in the best cases, sound "somewhat muffled and distant". The vocals on a few songs are so indistinct that labelling and liner notes on early releases gave incorrect information about who was singing and the exact song being performed. Much of the Beatles' dialogue between songs is audible, which includes addressing the audience in both English and German, as well as repartee among themselves. The banter is irreverent and coarse at times, an aspect of their stage act that would soon cease under the influence of manager Brian Epstein.

=== Marketing attempts ===
Taylor said he had offered to sell the tapes to Epstein in the mid-1960s, but that Epstein did not consider them to be of commercial value and offered only £20. Taylor said he kept the tapes at home, largely forgotten until 1973 when he decided to look into their marketability. Williams related a different history than Taylor, stating that after Taylor returned to Liverpool, he left the tapes with a recording engineer for editing into a potential album. The project was never finished and the engineer later relocated, with the tapes being among many items left behind. In 1972, Williams, Taylor, and the engineer gained access to the abandoned office and recovered the tapes "from beneath a pile of rubble on the floor."

When the existence of the tapes was first publicly reported in July 1973, Williams was planning to ask Apple for at least £100,000. Williams said he later met with George Harrison and Starr to offer the tapes for £5,000, but they declined, citing financial difficulties at the time. Williams and Taylor teamed up with Paul Murphy, head of Buk Records, to find an outlet for the tapes.

=== Release ===
Murphy eventually bought the tapes himself and formed a new company, Lingasong, specifically for the project. He sold the worldwide distribution rights to Double H Licensing, which spent more than $100,000 on elaborate audio processing and mixing of the songs under the direction of Larry Grossberg. The sequence of songs was rearranged, and some of the individual songs were edited to bypass flawed tape sections or make up for an incomplete recording.

After an unsuccessful attempt by the Beatles to block it, the 26-song Live! at the Star-Club in Hamburg, Germany; 1962 was released by Lingasong. The album first appeared in West Germany and the UK in May 1977 in association with Bellaphon Records. For the album's June 1977 US release (in association with Atlantic Records), four songs were removed and replaced with four different songs from the tapes.

=== Reissues ===
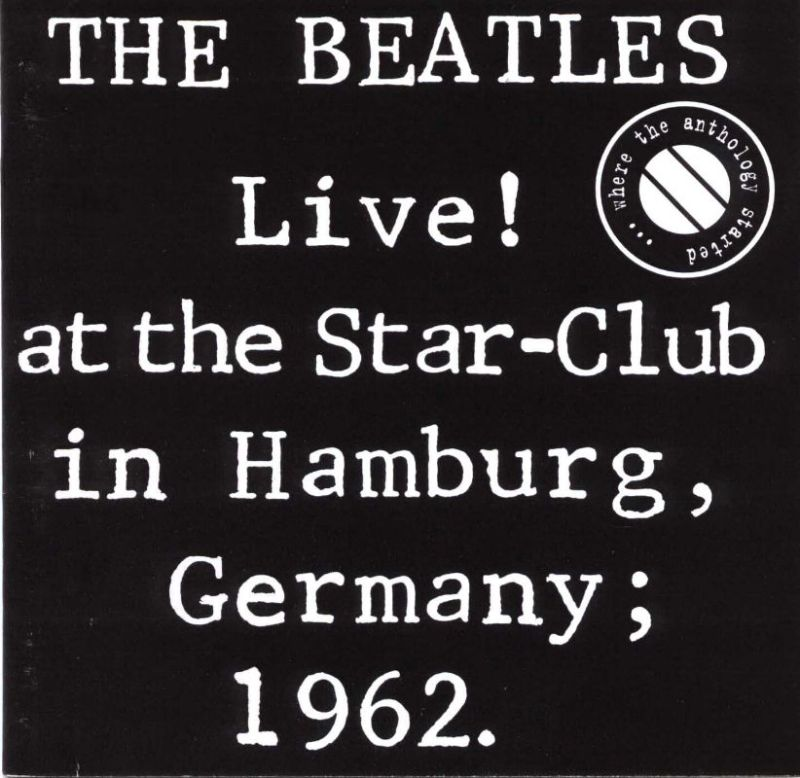
Front cover of the 1995 Lingalong CD reissue.

Over the next two decades, the recordings were licensed to several record companies, resulting in numerous releases with varying track selections. In 1979, Pickwick Records performed some additional audio filtering and equalisation of the songs on the Lingasong US version, and released it over two volumes as First Live Recordings; the set included the song "Hully Gully" that was mistakenly credited to the Beatles, but was actually performed by Cliff Bennett and the Rebel Rousers, another act on the Star-Club bill. In 1981, Audio Fidelity Enterprises released Historic Sessions in the UK, the first single package with all 30 Beatles tracks from the original Star-Club releases. Several additional songs from the Star-Club tapes have appeared on Beatles bootleg records over the years.

In 1985, a bootlegger known as "Richard", who had already found infamy by issuing several titles with controversial covers and content (such as "Elvis' Greatest Shit"), issued his own bootleg version of the Star Club tapes without any of the editing found on the official releases, entitled The Beatles vs. the Third Reich—directly parodying The Beatles vs the Four Seasons in both name and cover.

The release of the recordings on two CDs by industry giant Sony Music in 1991 sparked renewed legal attention by the Beatles (as represented by Paul McCartney, Harrison, Starr, and Yoko Ono). Sony also produced a version specifically for their Columbia House music club, but Sony withdrew the titles in 1992 as a lawsuit was progressing. Lingasong's CD release of the original set prompted another lawsuit from the Beatles in 1996; the case was decided in 1998 in favour of the Beatles, who were granted ownership of the tapes and exclusive rights to their use. Harrison appeared in person to provide evidence in the case, and his testimony was cited as an important factor in the judge's decision. Harrison characterised the claim that Lennon gave Taylor permission for the recording as "a load of rubbish", and added: "One drunken person recording another bunch of drunks does not constitute business deals."

In 2022, film director Peter Jackson speculated that the technology used to enhance the audio of the Beatles' Let It Be sessions for his documentary Get Back could also be used to increase the quality of the Star-Club tapes. In a 2023 interview, Jackson confirmed that he and his staff recently located and purchased the original tapes and plan on using machine learning to clean them up, though Apple currently has no plans for release.

== Reception ==
Professional ratings
Review scores
Source	Rating
AllMusic	2/5 stars
Christgau's Record Guide	B−
Encyclopedia of Popular Music	2/5 stars
Pitchfork	8.1/10
The Rolling Stone Album Guide	2/5 stars

The album had limited commercial success, reaching a peak position of No. 111 during a seven-week run on the US Billboard 200 album chart. Assessments of the album often weigh the poor sound quality against the historic importance and insight provided into the Beatles' early stage act. Rolling Stone reviewer John Swenson called the album "poorly recorded but fascinating" and commented that it showed the Beatles as "raw but extremely powerful." AllMusic reviewer Richie Unterberger commented that the reissue's "results were very low-fidelity, and despite The Beatles' enormous success, it took Taylor fifteen years to find someone greedy and shameless enough to release them as a record". Q magazine described the recordings as having "certain historical interest" and remarked: "The show seems like a riot but the sound itself is terrible – like one hell of a great party going on next door." Harrison assessed that "the Star-Club recording was the crummiest recording ever made in our name!"

== Track listing ==
=== Germany/UK version ===
(Bellaphon BLS5560/Lingasong LNL1)

Side one

1. Introduction/"I Saw Her Standing There" (John Lennon, Paul McCartney) – 0:34/2:22
2. "Roll Over Beethoven" (Chuck Berry) – 2:15
3. "Hippy Hippy Shake" (Chan Romero) – 1:42
4. "Sweet Little Sixteen" (Berry) – 2:45
5. "Lend Me Your Comb" (Kay Twomey, Fred Wise, Ben Weisman) – 1:44
6. "Your Feet's Too Big" (Ada Benson, Fred Fisher) – 2:18

Side two

7. "Twist and Shout" (Phil Medley, Bert Russell) – 2:03
8. "Mr. Moonlight" (Roy Lee Johnson) – 2:06
9. "A Taste of Honey" (Bobby Scott, Ric Marlow) – 1:45
10. "Bésame Mucho" (Consuelo Velázquez, Sunny Skylar) – 2:36
11. "Reminiscing" (King Curtis) – 1:41
12. "Kansas City/Hey, Hey, Hey, Hey" (Jerry Leiber, Mike Stoller, Richard Penniman) – 2:09

Side three

13. "Nothin' Shakin' (But the Leaves on the Trees)" (Eddie Fontaine, Cirino Colacrai, Diane Lampert, John Gluck) – 1:15
14. "To Know Her Is to Love Her" (Phil Spector) – 3:02
15. "Little Queenie" (Berry) – 3:51
16. "Falling in Love Again (Can't Help It)" (Frederick Hollander, Sammy Lerner) – 1:57
17. "Ask Me Why" (Lennon, McCartney) – 2:26
18. "Be-Bop-A-Lula" (Gene Vincent, Bill Davis) – 2:29
  - Guest lead vocal by Fred Fascher, Star-Club waiter
19. "Hallelujah I Love Her So" (Ray Charles) – 2:10
  - Guest lead vocal by Horst Fascher, Star-Club manager

Side four

20. "Red Sails in the Sunset" (Jimmy Kennedy, Hugh Williams) – 2:00
21. "Everybody's Trying to Be My Baby" (Carl Perkins) – 2:25
22. "Matchbox" (Carl Perkins) – 2:35
23. "I'm Talking About You" (Berry) – 1:48
24. "Shimmy Like Kate" (Armand Piron, Fred Smith, Cliff Goldsmith) – 2:17
  - Based on The Olympics' arrangement of "I Wish I Could Shimmy Like My Sister Kate"; sometimes misidentified as "Shimmy Shimmy" or "Shimmy Shake"
25. "Long Tall Sally" (Enotris Johnson, Robert Blackwell, Penniman) – 1:45
26. "I Remember You" (Johnny Mercer, Victor Schertzinger) – 1:54

=== US version ===
(Lingasong/Atlantic LS-2-7001)

The US version includes the above except "I Saw Her Standing There", "Twist and Shout", "Reminiscing", and "Ask Me Why", and substitutes the following four songs:

1. Introduction/"I'm Gonna Sit Right Down and Cry (Over You)" (Joe Thomas, Howard Biggs) – 3:04
7. "Where Have You Been (All My Life)" (Barry Mann, Cynthia Weil) – 1:55
11. "Till There Was You" (Meredith Willson) – 1:59
17. "Sheila" (Tommy Roe) – 1:56

== Personnel ==
- John Lennon – rhythm guitar; harmony and backing vocals; harmonica on track 26; lead vocal on tracks 4, 5 (shared), 7, 8, 14, 17, 22, 23, 24, US1, US7
- Paul McCartney – bass guitar; harmony and backing vocals; lead vocal on tracks 1, 3, 5 (shared), 6, 9, 10, 12, 15, 16, 20, 25, 26, US11
- George Harrison – lead guitar; harmony and backing vocals; lead vocal on tracks 2, 11, 13, 21, US17
- Ringo Starr – drums and percussion
