= Birth of the Beatles =

1979 biopic film directed by Richard Marquand

- Theatrical release poster
- Directed by: Richard Marquand
- Screenplay by: John Kurland; Jacob Eskendar
- Story by: John Kurland
- Produced by: Tony Bishop
- Starring: Stephen MacKenna; Rod Culbertson; John Altman; Ray Ashcroft; David Wilkinson; Brian Jameson
- Cinematography: Alan Hume
- Edited by: Sean Barton
- Music by: Carl Davis
- Production company: Dick Clark Productions
- Release date: November 23, 1979
- Running time: 104 minutes
- Country: United States
- Language: English

Birth of the Beatles is a 1979 American biographical film, produced by Dick Clark Productions and directed by Richard Marquand. It was shown as a TV film on ABC in the United States, and received a theatrical release in other countries. The film focuses on the early history of the Beatles. It was released nine years after the Beatles disbanded, and is the only biographical film about the band to be released while all four members were alive. Pete Best, the Beatles' original drummer, served as a technical advisor for the production.

== Plot ==
The film starts in 1959, when the Silver Beatles (as they were then called) consisted of John Lennon, Paul McCartney, George Harrison and Stuart Sutcliffe. They need a drummer and a manager, and although Sutcliffe can sing, he cannot play an instrument. The only reason Stu is in the band because he is John's friend; none of the others want to play the bass guitar. They go and audition for an agent, where they meet Rory Storm and the Hurricanes, eventually becoming good friends with the Hurricanes' drummer, Ringo Starr. The agent at the audition says that if they get themselves a permanent drummer, they can have a job in Scotland, and then afterward a job in Hamburg, Germany.

The Scotland gig occurs, but is not shown onscreen. The band finds a long-term drummer in Pete Best, whose mother owns the teenagers' hangout spot The Casbah Coffee Club. They begin to prepare for the trip to Hamburg, which lasts several months; they encounter disapproval from John's girlfriend Cynthia and John's Aunt Mimi. When they reach Hamburg, they discover they are playing in the Indra Club on the Reeperbahn, Hamburg's notorious sex district. They play long, grueling hours – up to eight hours a night, seven days a week – and stay active by taking Preludin, an appetite-suppressing stimulant drug. They are living in the back of the Bambi Kino, a run-down old cinema. While in the Indra, they play loudly and wildly, eating, spitting, and drinking onstage, inviting women to dance on stage with them, etc. Things get so loud that the club is eventually shut down.

Now renamed the Beatles, the band began to perform at the bigger Kaiserkeller club, becoming a big hit among the German audience. While there, they meet up with Ringo and Rory Storm, who are also performing there, and Stu falls in love with German photographer Astrid Kirchherr. Stu and Astrid begin to have a love affair. Suddenly, in the middle of a gig, German police burst into the club and arrest George for working underage without the proper work permit. While searching for the paperwork to release George, Paul and Pete drop a candle that sets fire to the Bambi Kino, and the whole band is deported.

The downbeat Beatles struggle at home with their disapproving families, but gradually their reputation grows; they play shows that fill the concert halls. One night after a performance, Stu is attacked and badly beaten by a gang outside. His friends rescue him, but Stu refuses to seek medical attention after being kicked in the head.

A month later, in 1962, the Beatles return to Hamburg. Stu reunites with Astrid and she cuts his hair into the famous moptop haircut. The others get their hair cut in the same manner and the Beatle haircut is born. They experience the same level of success as during the first trip, but Stu, a talented painter, wants to leave the group and attend art school and marry Astrid. However, before he can accomplish his dreams, he dies suddenly of a brain hemorrhage. The others find this to be emotionally shattering, and think if he only had seen a doctor, things would have turned out fine.

Back in Britain, the owner of the NEMS Records Shop, Brian Epstein, is alerted that the Beatles are causing quite a stir in Liverpool with their performances at the Cavern Club. He is impressed with what he sees and asks to be the group's manager. They accept and the Beatles have an audition for Decca Records, but are turned down. They keep searching for a record company to accept them, but are turned down time after time. They are beginning to lose all hope. Around this time, they learn that Epstein is a homosexual and that he was attacked by a Teddy boy in Liverpool because of it. However, they hold no prejudices and accept. Also, the Beatles finally get accepted by record producer George Martin, but decide to sack Pete from the group. In his place is Ringo, and now the classic foursome is complete. However, before the first show with Ringo, the fans react angrily to Pete's firing; they later become overly excited after hearing Ringo's drumming abilities and listen to "I Saw Her Standing There".

After their success, Cynthia announces to John that she is pregnant and the two decide to wed. The Beatles release their first single, "Love Me Do" and in 1963 release their first No. 1 hit single, "Please Please Me". They become the most famous group in Britain. In 1964, they are heading to America for the first time, after already encountering massive success across Europe. The film ends when the group arrives in America and performs on The Ed Sullivan Show to a mass of screaming fans, singing "I Want to Hold Your Hand".

== Cast ==
- Stephen MacKenna as John Lennon
- Rod Culbertson as Paul McCartney
- John Altman as George Harrison
- Ray Ashcroft as Ringo Starr
- Ryan Michael as Pete Best
- David Nicholas Wilkinson as Stuart Sutcliffe
- Brian Jameson as Brian Epstein
- Wendy Morgan as Cynthia Lennon
- Gary Olsen as Rory Storm
- Linal Haft as Agent
- Eileen Kennally as Mimi Smith
- Richard Marner as Bruno Koschmider
- Alyson Spiro as Astrid Kirchherr
- Nigel Havers as George Martin
- Gareth Forwood as Alden
- Paula Jacobs as Mrs. Flemming

== Soundtrack ==
The film was allowed to use songs written by the Beatles, but rather than the original recordings, the songs in the film were recorded by the Beatles tribute act Rain. The guitar and vocal parts for John Lennon were performed by Eddie Lineberry, Paul McCartney by Chuck Coffey, George Harrison by Bill Connearney, and Ringo Starr by Steve Wight.

The songs featured in the film are:

1. "She Loves You" (John Lennon/Paul McCartney) - opening titles version
2. "My Bonnie (Lies Over the Ocean)" (traditional, arr. Tony Sheridan)
3. "Oh Baby Doll" - performed by a different group at the Liverpool audition
4. "Dizzy Miss Lizzy" (Larry Williams)
5. "Blue Suede Shoes" (Carl Perkins) - performed by Rory Storm and the Hurricanes
6. "I Saw Her Standing There" (John Lennon/Paul McCartney) - featuring Pete Best on drums
7. "Don't Bother Me" (George Harrison) - shown being performed by the Beatles in Hamburg in 1961; this is an anachronism, as George Harrison did not write the song until 1963
8. "Johnny B. Goode" (Chuck Berry)
9. "Lawdy Miss Clawdy" (Lloyd Price) - performed by Rory Storm and the Hurricanes
10. "Roll Over Beethoven" (Chuck Berry)
11. "Kansas City" (Jerry Leiber/Mike Stoller)
12. "Hey! Hey! Hey! Hey!" (Richard Penniman)
13. "Shake, Rattle and Roll!" (Charles F. Calhoun)
14. "Ask Me Why" (John Lennon/Paul McCartney)
15. "Love Me Tender" (music: George R. Poulton/lyrics: Ken Darby; however, the lyrics were officially credited to Elvis Presley and Darby's wife, Vera Matson)
16. "Twist and Shout" (Phil Medley/Bert Berns)
17. "P.S. I Love You" (John Lennon/Paul McCartney)
18. "Dizzy Miss Lizzy" (Larry Williams) - reprise, a different recording featuring heavier drums and a more raw-sounding guitar
19. "Cry for a Shadow" (John Lennon/George Harrison)
20. "Please Mr. Postman" (Georgia Dobbins/William Garrett/Freddie Gorman/Brian Holland/Robert Bateman)
21. "Long Tall Sally" (Enotris Johnson/Robert Blackwell/Richard Penniman)
22. "Love Me Do" (John Lennon/Paul McCartney)
23. "Rock and Roll Music" (Chuck Berry)
24. "I Saw Her Standing There" (John Lennon/Paul McCartney) - reprise, featuring Ringo Starr on drums; the drumming styles differ between versions for story reasons
25. "Please Please Me" (John Lennon/Paul McCartney)
26. "Thank You Girl" (John Lennon/Paul McCartney)
27. "I Want to Hold Your Hand" (John Lennon/Paul McCartney)
28. "She Loves You" (John Lennon/Paul McCartney) - ending titles version

== Pete Best's involvement ==
Pete Best, the Beatles' original drummer, served as a technical advisor for the production. The film has been said to reflect Best's personal account of certain events, and shows some evidence of bias, namely implying that Best was terminated from the band because of their resentment toward Best's popularity in Liverpool at the time. In one scene, the band are referred to by John Lennon as "Peter Best and His Sods" and makes no mention of dissatisfaction with Best's playing. George Martin, the Beatles' producer, has repeatedly stated that he was not satisfied with the calibre of Best's drumming at the band's EMI audition, and wanted the drum parts played by a studio drummer for their first single. Ringo Starr, already a friend of the group, became Best's replacement.

== Reception ==
The film received modest ratings when it premiered on American television, and was repeated in January 1981, as a tribute to John Lennon in the weeks after his murder. It later repeated on CBS, on The CBS Late Movie during the 1980s.

== See also ==
- Backbeat – a 1994 film about the original lineup of the Beatles, dealing mainly with Stuart Sutcliffe and the band's days in Hamburg, Germany
