= Große Freiheit 36 =

Music club in Hamburg, Germany

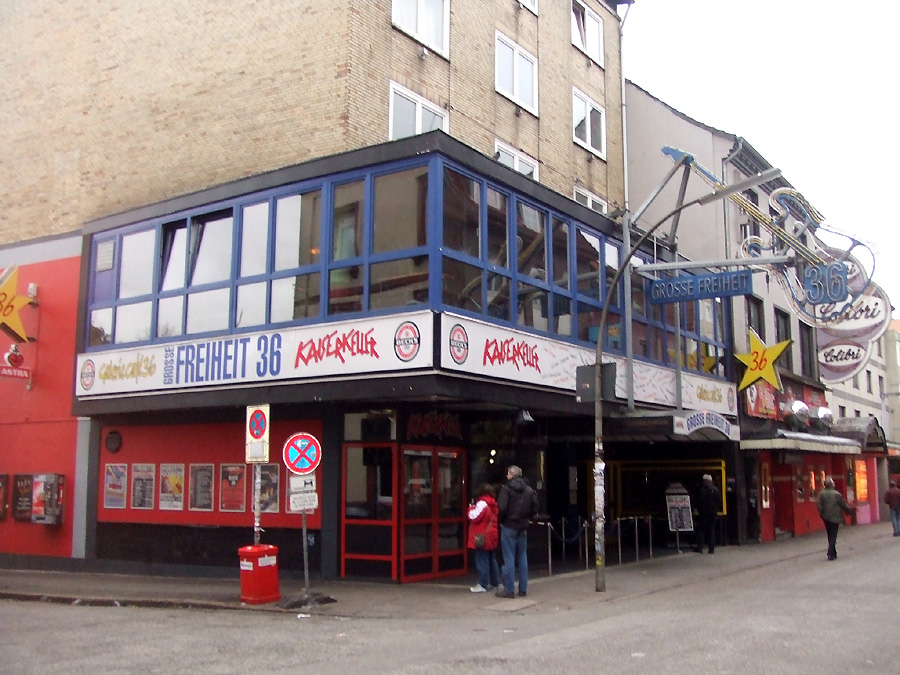
- Interactive map of Große Freiheit 36

Construction
- Opened: 19 September 1985

Website
- grossefreiheit36.de

Große Freiheit 36 is a music club on Große Freiheit street in Hamburg's St. Pauli district. The Kaiserkeller is in its basement.

== History ==
Already in the 1940s, the address was home to the "Hippodrom", a club that had been made famous in the films of Hans Albers. It featured a rotunda filled with wood chips, in which guests and regular artistes would ride on horses. During the second world war, the building was destroyed by bomb attacks, but it was rebuilt after the end of the war. Bruno Koschmider (1926-2000), an ex-trapeze artist, opened the Kaiserkeller in October 1959 at Große Freiheit 36 with place for 550 guests (not seated). On 19 September 1985 the music club opened under the current name Große Freiheit 36 with a concert by the blues guitarist Rory Gallagher. One year later, the Kaiserkeller reopened, and a Café was set up in the upper level. On 19 February 2015, the club hosted the concert for the preselection of the German entry to the Eurovision Song Contest 2015.

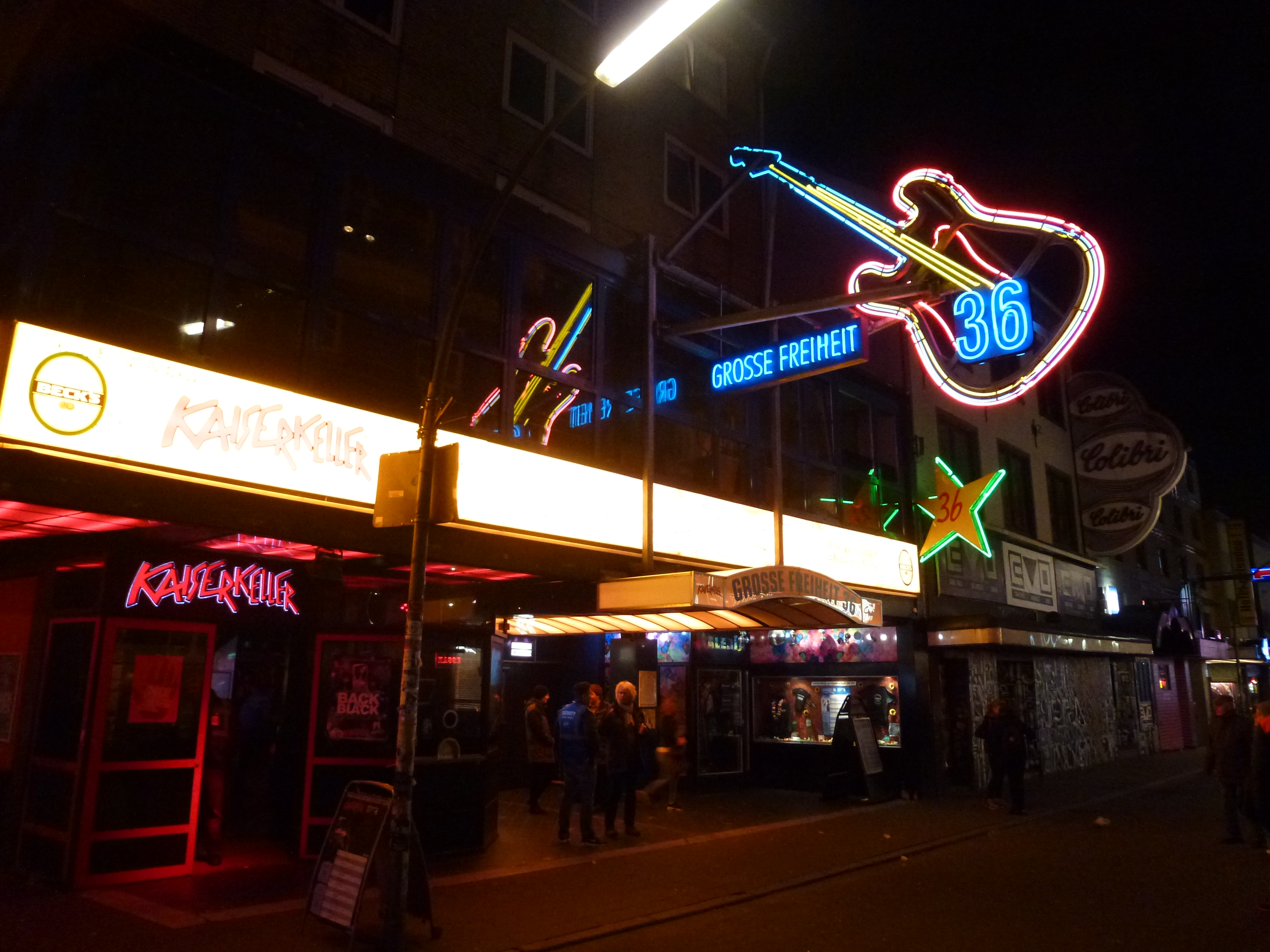
Große Freiheit 36 at night

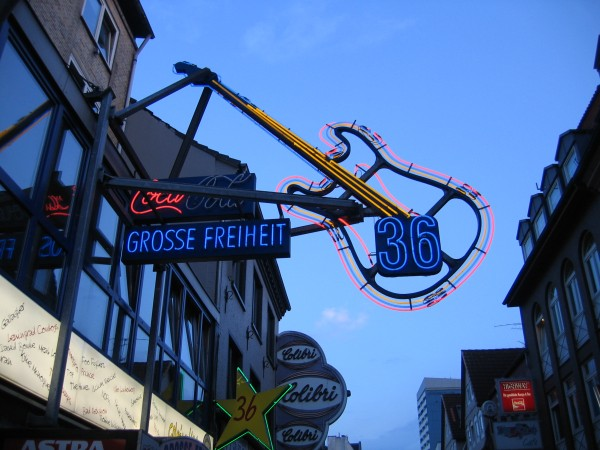
The neon guitar sign over the main entrance

== Selected concert history ==
=== 1980s ===
Smokie, Abi Wallenstein, Wishbone Ash, Nick Cave, Extrabreit, LL Cool J, Public Enemy, Rio Reiser, Faith No More, Meat Loaf, R.E.M., Neil Young, Southside Johnny & The Asbury Jukes, Lou Gramm, Billy Preston, Pixies

=== 1990s ===
Ice-T, Deep Purple, Leningrad Cowboys, Gloria Gaynor, Héroes del Silencio, Blur, Pearl Jam, Die Fantastischen Vier, Björk, Marius Müller-Westernhagen, Bob Geldof, Jamiroquai, Sheryl Crow, Faithless, Marilyn Manson, Daft Punk, Robbie Williams, Smashing Pumpkins, Backstreet Boys, Rammstein, Paul Rodgers, Soft Parade

=== 2000s ===
Green Day, Wyclef Jean, Placebo, Coldplay, Black Eyed Peas, Kylie Minogue, Busta Rhymes, Tocotronic, Queens of the Stone Age, Underworld, The Roots, Seeed, The White Stripes, Sugababes, Sportfreunde Stiller, Kaiser Chiefs, Jimmy Eat World, Xzibit, The Killers, Richard Ashcroft, Swiss, Alligatoah, Kelly Clarkson, Hoodie Allen, Metronomy, Saltatio Mortis, Kendrick Lamar

=== 2010s ===
Kelly Clarkson, Revolverheld, Wir sind Helden, Lena Meyer-Landrut, Lukas Graham, Nelly Furtado, All Time Low, R.Kelly, Rita Ora
