= Sun Tailor =

Israeli born British musical artist

Sun Tailor ארנון נאור
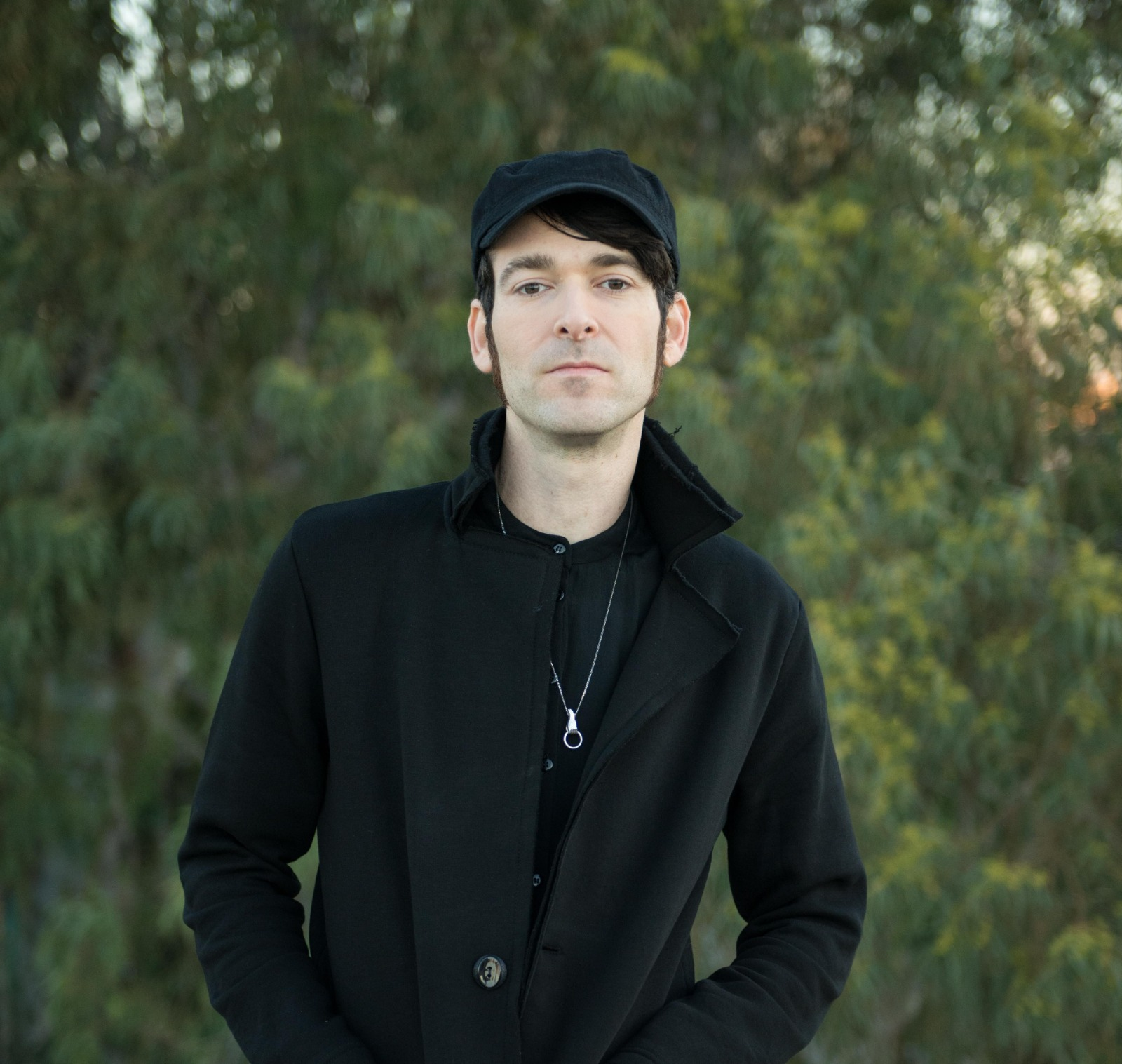

Background information
- Also known as: Arnon Naor
- Born: 28 June 1980 (age 45)
- Origin: Tel Aviv, Israel
- Genres: indie rock, Folk music, folk rock, indie folk
- Occupations: Singer-songwriter, musician
- Instruments: Guitar, vocals, lap steel guitar, 12-string guitar
- Years active: 2008–present

Sun Tailor is the stage name of Israeli-born singer-songwriter and producer Arnon Naor (Hebrew: ארנון נאור).

== Musical career ==
Arnon Naor (Sun Tailor) was born in Israel in 1980. He began playing the guitar when he was 20 years old, and by the age of 23 he moved to London, UK, in order to study music. During his time in London, Naor joined several bands, and by 2007 he began to work on his own material, This was the beginning of his debut album "Like the Tide", which he began recording after returning to Israel in 2008. The whole album was recorded in Naor's bedroom in a small Tel Aviv apartment, which was converted into a home studio. It was produced by Naor alongside his brother Udi Naor.

Naor spent 2011 touring Israel with his band, Udi Naor (drums, percussion), Daniel Sapir (bass, vocals), Omri Barel (lap steel and electric guitars), and Jackie Fay (cello, vocals), and in November 2011 he went on an acoustic tour in Europe, playing several shows in Paris and London.

By the end of 2011, he finally released his debut single Don't Knock on my Door, followed by his long anticipated debut album “Like the Tide”, which was released in February 2012.

In September 2012, Naor toured Germany, playing Reeperbahn festival in Hamburg, where he played the famous Beatles venue- Kaiserkeller.

He also embarked on an acoustic living room tour, where he was invited via CouchSurfing to perform intimate solo shows at the living rooms of fans.

He spent 2013 touring Israel and Europe both solo and with his band, while writing and recording his second album.

This Light, his second self produced album, was released in Israel November 2014 and garnered praise from both the indie and the mainstream media.

The leading single from the album, Who's at Your Window, received extensive airplay on radio and TV channels, partly due to its video, directed by Jonathan Vardi.

== Discography ==
- Don't Knock on my Door (single) November 2011
- Like the Tide (LP) February 2012
- Who's at Your Window (single) August 2014
- Spit Fire (single) October 2014
- This Light (LP) November 2014
