= Allan Williams =

British businessman and promoter (1930–2016)

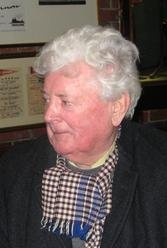
- Williams in 2014

Background information
- Born: Allan Richard Williams; 21 February 1930; Bootle, Lancashire, England
- Died: 30 December 2016 (aged 86) Liverpool, England
- Occupations: Talent manager, businessman
- Years active: 1959–2016

Allan Richard Williams (21 February 1930 – 30 December 2016) was a British businessman and promoter who was the original booking agent and first manager of the Beatles. He drove the van to take the young band to Hamburg, West Germany, in 1960, where they gained the vital show business experience that led to their emergence on the world stage. Williams was also a promoter and agent of a number of other Liverpool rock acts, helping stoke the Merseybeat boom of the early 1960s.

== Ancestry and early life ==
Williams was born in Knowsley Road, Bootle. His father was Richard Edward Williams, a local council building inspector and dance promoter, and his mother was Annie Cheetham; Williams traced part of his ancestry back to Owen Williams (Owain Gwyrfai), a Caernarfonshire millwright, poet and pioneer lexicographer in the Welsh language. His mother died when he was very young and his father remarried to Millie Twigg, the family living in Litherland and being completed by Williams's half-sister Olwyn (b. 1937) and half-brother Graham (b. 1938). In his mid-teens he left home to sing with Joe Loss in the Isle of Man. Later he sang with the D'Oyly Carte Opera Company and even tried to sell Blackpool rock in Spain.

In 1955, Williams married Beryl Chang, a school teacher born in Liverpool to Chinese immigrants. The Williams' mixed-race marriage subjected them to verbal abuse from locals.

== Early business ventures ==
=== Nightclubs ===
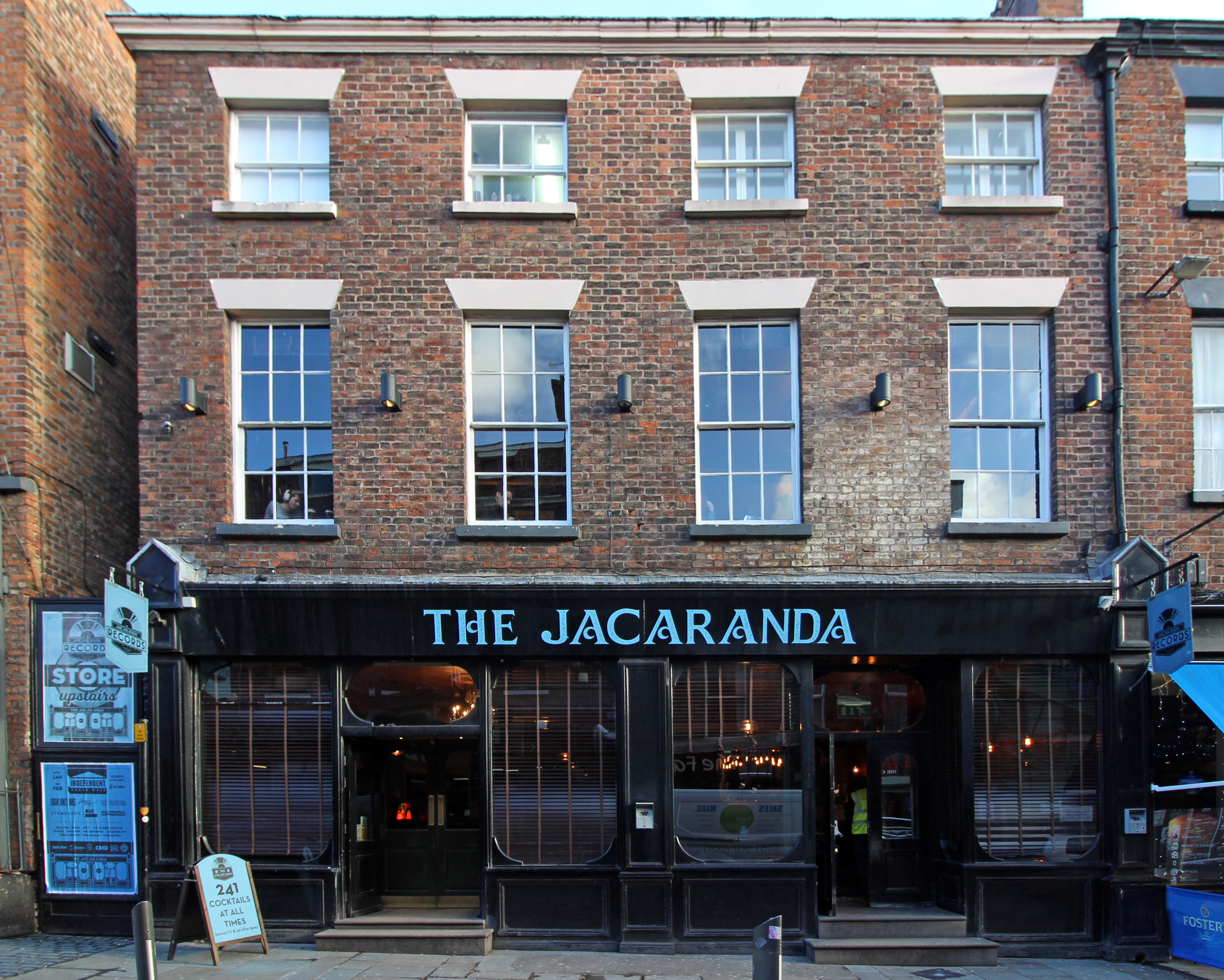
The Jacaranda founded by Williams on Slater Street, Liverpool

In 1958 Williams was inspired by London's 2i's Coffee Bar and leased a former watch-repair shop at 21–23 Slater Street, Liverpool, which he converted into a coffee bar, The Jacaranda. With "the Jac's" proximity to Liverpool Art College and a local art supplies shop, the venue became popular with the city's young beatniks and art students. Williams asked students Stuart Sutcliffe and Rod Murray to paint murals in the club's basement, and their classmate, John Lennon, began attending regularly (as did Paul McCartney and George Harrison, though less frequently). Williams offered musical entertainment at the club, such as Lord Woodbine's Royal Caribbean Steel Band and, later, local rock and roll bands like Cass and the Cassanovas.

In 1960, Williams took on a number of additional projects, such as backing Lord Woodbine's strip club in Liverpool, the Cabaret Artists Social Club. He and Woodbine traveled to Hamburg, West Germany in late January 1960, where they became acquainted with Bruno Koschmider, owner of the Kaiserkeller Club. By coincidence, Williams and Koschmider met again in July at the 2i's Coffee Bar, where they arranged for Derry and the Seniors (and soon, other Liverpool groups) to perform in Hamburg. On 1 December 1960, Williams opened the Top Ten Club on Liverpool's Soho Street (the name being borrowed from a Hamburg club popular with Liverpool rock acts, including the Beatles), with Bob Wooler as its DJ. However, the club burned down a week later due to an electricity overload.

In spring 1960, Williams bought the lease for a social club with plans to convert it into a nightclub called the Blue Angel. The Blue Angel opened in March 1962.

=== Rock concert promotion ===
In March 1960, Williams attended a Liverpool Empire concert starring Gene Vincent and Eddie Cochran, which prompted Williams to host his own show with the two stars. He and promoter Larry Parnes agreed to host a show on 3 May with the two American stars and a coterie of Liverpool rock acts, including Rory Storm and the Hurricanes (which then included Ringo Starr) and Gerry and the Pacemakers. Cochran died in a car crash less than three weeks before the concert, though Vincent and the Liverpool acts still performed as scheduled. The show was a huge success for the Liverpool rock scene and opened a fruitful working relationship between Williams and Parnes for several months.

In May 1962, Williams booked Jerry Lee Lewis to perform on a bill with Rory Storm and the Hurricanes at New Brighton Tower Ballroom.

== Beatles management ==
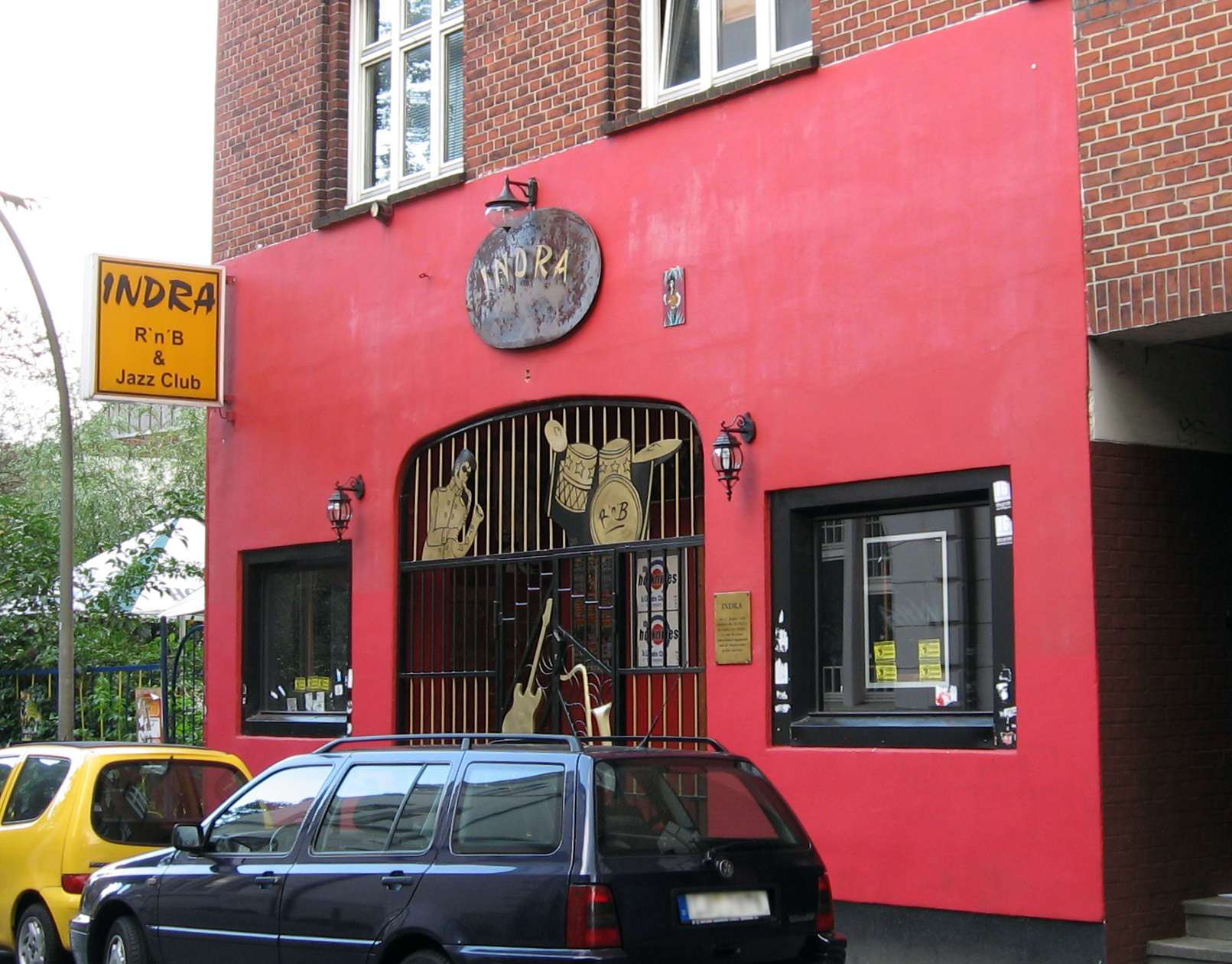
Williams secured the Beatles work at the Indra Club in Hamburg, West Germany, in 1960.

In May 1960, as Williams began supplying Parnes with backing groups for solo singers, the Beatles, as regular patrons and performers at the Jacaranda, pressed Williams for opportunities; Williams helped find them a temporary drummer (Tommy Moore) and booked them for an audition with Parnes. The audition resulted in Parnes asking the Beatles to tour Scotland as the backing band for Johnny Gentle in late May 1960. Between May and August, Williams secured a number of bookings for the group at other places. Rod Murray observed, "None of [the Beatles] had any business sense, and without Allan Williams I don't think they would have got anywhere." One memorable booking was backing a local stripper, named Janice; when she discovered the Beatles were not familiar with the "Gypsy Fire Dance", they instead backed her with a rendition of the Harry Lime theme tune.

Around 8 August 1960, Bruno Koschmider asked Williams for another Liverpool rock act to perform at his Indra Club. After first approaching several other groups, Williams asked the Beatles, who agreed. Lacking a permanent drummer in their line-up, they quickly recruited Pete Best after a 13 August audition held at one of Williams's clubs. On 15 August, Williams commenced a road and ferry journey in his Morris J2 van that carried him, Beryl, her younger brother Berry Chang, Lord Woodbine, and the Beatles, to Hamburg by the early morning hours of 17 August. In late September, Williams and Koschmider agreed to have the Beatles and Rory Storm and the Hurricanes perform together at the Kaiserkeller. Williams earned a 10% commission on the groups' payments from Koschmider.

The Beatles returned from Hamburg in December 1960, simultaneous with the collapse of Williams's Top Ten Club and the planned opening of the Blue Angel. Distracted by these matters, Williams stepped back from rock management and asked Bob Wooler to handle the Beatles' affairs. However, he helped McCartney and Best appeal deportation orders from the German government so that the Beatles could return for a spring 1961 Top Ten Club residency.

When the band returned to Hamburg in late March, they (except for Stuart Sutcliffe) refused to pay Williams's 10% commission, citing unhappiness with German tax deductions from their weekly paycheck. An irate Williams threatened to have the Beatles' residency terminated and their behavior reported to the Agency Members Association, which could have jeopardized the group's ability to seek management in the UK. He did neither of these things, but in July 1961 he threatened to sue the band for 104 pounds. The Beatles hired a solicitor to rebut Williams's claim, and Williams let the legal action lapse by December. In December, Williams met with the Beatles' second manager, Brian Epstein—memorably warning him, "Brian, don't touch them with a fucking bargepole"—but eventually lifting his ban on the Beatles' entry to the Blue Angel.

== Life after the Beatles ==
Years later, Williams and the Beatles spoke fondly of one another, with McCartney describing Williams in The Beatles Anthology as 'a great guy'. In the 1970s, Williams played a crucial role in producing the first Beatles conventions to be staged in Liverpool, and he was a perennial VIP guest at the city's annual Beatle Week Festivals. In 1975, he published a memoir, The Man Who Gave the Beatles Away, to which Lennon gave his endorsement. Recovering a tape of a latter-day Beatles show in Hamburg (performing on New Year's Eve of 1962–63), he saw it released (in 1977) as Live! at the Star-Club in Hamburg, Germany; 1962. The tapes were rereleased and bootlegged multiple times in the years since under different titles on budget labels. In 1999 the micro-budget film All Those Years Ago was released by Shotmaker Productions. The film is largely based on William's own recollections of his time managing the fledgling Beatles. Although initially flattered and sympathetic to the film, in his second book, A Fool on the Hill, Williams described the film makers as being deceitful and the film as "utter rubbish". The Man Who Gave the Beatles Away is also the title of a musical by Irish playwright Ronan Wilmot, which was performed at the New Theatre in Dublin in 2002.

Williams carried on speaking at Beatles conventions from Liverpool to Singapore and South America. The Jacaranda reopened after a brief hiatus under new management in the mid-1990s and saw success build upon its cult status throughout the following decade; it remains a popular venue for young and old lovers of live music and hosted many gigs for Liverpool's Sound City music festival.

Williams gave an extended interview in the 1982 documentary, The Compleat Beatles.

In the early to mid 1980s he had a stall at the entrance to the burgeoning Camden Market in London, where he would sell old brassware including taps and accessories.

In 2012 French comics Gihef and Vanders published Liverfool (Emmanuel Proust Editions) in which they relate Allan Williams's encounter with the "Fab Four" and their first steps together.

On 9 May 2016, at a ceremony in Liverpool Town Hall, Williams was made a Citizen of Honour of the City of Liverpool, awarded by Liverpool City Council for his services to the local music scene.

Williams is briefly seen in Peter Jackson's 2021 The Beatles: Get Back documentary constructed from unused footage originally shot by Michael Lindsay-Hogg while making the Let It Be film in 1969.

Allan Williams died in Liverpool on 30 December 2016, at the age of 86.

In 2024 Williams was portrayed by Eddie Suzy Izzard in the British biographical film Midas Man, about the life of music entrepreneur Brian Epstein.
