= Backbeat (film) =

1994 film by Iain Softley

- British theatrical release poster
- Directed by: Iain Softley
- Written by: Iain Softley; Michael Thomas; Stephen Ward
- Produced by: Finola Dwyer; Stephen Woolley
- Starring: Sheryl Lee; Stephen Dorff; Ian Hart
- Cinematography: Ian Wilson
- Edited by: Martin Walsh
- Music by: Don Was
- Production companies: Channel Four Films; PolyGram Filmed Entertainment
- Distributed by: Rank Film Distributors (UK)
- Release dates: January 1994 (Sundance); 1 April 1994 (London)
- Running time: 100 minutes
- Country: United Kingdom
- Language: English
- Box office: $5.5 million (US/UK/Australia)

Backbeat is a 1994 British biographical drama film directed and co-written by Iain Softley in his feature directorial debut. It chronicles the early days of the Beatles in Hamburg, West Germany, focusing primarily on the relationship between Stuart Sutcliffe (Stephen Dorff) and John Lennon (Ian Hart), and also with Sutcliffe's German girlfriend Astrid Kirchherr (Sheryl Lee).

The film was produced by Channel Four Films and PolyGram Filmed Entertainment, and was released in the UK on 1 April 1994. It received mixed-to-positive reviews from critics, though was well received by the real-life Beatles and Kirchherr. The score by Don Was earned a BAFTA Award for Best Original Music, and the film was nominated for Outstanding British Film and Best Sound.

== Plot ==
In Liverpool, England in 1960, art students and friends John Lennon and Stuart Sutcliffe have an altercation with a group of men outside a club, with Stu sustaining a head injury. Stu is a painter, and has joined John's rock-and-roll group the Beatles as their bass guitarist. The Beatles, their line-up comprising John, Stu, Paul McCartney, George Harrison, and Pete Best, travel by ship to Hamburg, Germany, and are introduced to the city's red-light district, the Reeperbahn. The band plays regularly at the Kaiserkeller club, and their sleeping quarters are the storeroom of the Bambi Kino, a small cinema. They meet German artist Klaus Voormann, and begin taking the drug Preludin to stay awake and play for long hours.

Klaus brings his girlfriend, German photographer Astrid Kirchherr, to see the Beatles perform, and introduces her to Stu. The Beatles and Astrid go to Bar Enfer, where a drunk John begins yelling at Stu over Astrid, before being escorted out by Paul. Later, the Beatles pose for photographs taken by Astrid. A record producer from Polydor Records comes to the Kaiserkeller to see the Beatles perform, but when he arrives, Stu is on stage singing "Love Me Tender" to Astrid, and the producer leaves, unimpressed. Paul wants Stu out of the band, but John states that if Stu leaves, he leaves as well.

The producer from Polydor returns to the Kaiserkeller and gives the Beatles the opportunity to perform on a record the following day. Stu says he is ill, so the other Beatles leave without him to attend the recording session, which sees them backing up singer Tony Sheridan. Astrid and Stu take photographs and have sex, and Klaus catches Stu and Astrid in bed together. Stu comes back to the Bambi Kino to find Ringo Starr, a drummer from another band, sleeping in his bunk bed. John remarks that he thought Stu had moved in "with the SS", and informs Stu that the Beatles are now playing at the Top Ten Club. Stu chooses instead to focus on his paintings. John visits Astrid, who criticizes him for his anger and accuses him of being jealous of her relationship with Stu. The Beatles are suddenly deported when authorities discover that George is under the age of 18; Stu and Astrid bid each other goodbye.

By December 1960, Stu wants to return to Hamburg, as he has not painted since he left. John thinks that Astrid was insinuating he has homosexual feelings towards Stu. By March 1961, George has turned 18, and the Beatles return to Hamburg, where Stu reunites with Astrid, who gives him a "mop top" haircut. Stu later tells John that he no longer wants to be in the band, and the two have a physical fight over Astrid. During a game of limbo at a club, Stu collapses in pain. A doctor suggests the incident is the result of a head injury. Stu proposes marriage to Astrid, and is accepted into a German art school. Stu and Astrid visit a beach with John and John's girlfriend Cynthia Powell; there, John expresses feelings for Astrid, but notes she fell in love with Stu. Stu and Astrid go to see the Beatles perform, with Paul having taken over as bassist, and the group bids the two farewell before leaving Hamburg.

On 13 August 1961, Stu comes home to find Astrid and Klaus holding hands, watching the news about the Berlin Wall being erected. Enraged, Stu assaults Klaus and throws paint all over Astrid's photographs and darkroom. He later apologises to Astrid, stating that his behaviour was unlike himself. Astrid tells Stu that the Beatles will soon become famous, and that Stu will grow to resent her as a result, but Stu denies this. Stu collapses in pain and dies of a brain haemorrhage. The Beatles, with John, Paul and George now sporting mop-top hairstyles, come back to Hamburg, where Astrid informs John that Stu is dead. At the Beatles' next performance, John sings a verse from "Love Me Tender" before the group breaks into "Twist and Shout". Astrid watches them perform before making her exit through the adoring crowd.

== Cast ==
- Sheryl Lee as Astrid Kirchherr
- Stephen Dorff as Stuart Sutcliffe
  - Henry Rollins as Sutcliffe's singing voice
- Ian Hart as John Lennon
  - Greg Dulli as Lennon's singing voice
- Gary Bakewell as Paul McCartney
  - Dave Pirner as McCartney's singing voice
- Chris O'Neill as George Harrison
- Scot Williams as Pete Best
- Kai Wiesinger as Klaus Voormann
- Jennifer Ehle as Cynthia Powell
- Rob Spendlove as Arthur Ballard
- Charlie Caine as Lord Woodbine
- Freda Kelly as Louise Harrison
- Paul Duckworth as Ringo Starr
- Paul Humpoletz as Bruno Koschmider
- Wolf Kahler as Bert Kaempfert
- James Doherty as Tony Sheridan
- Gertan Klauber as Pimp
- Alexei Jawdokimov as Napoleon

=== Casting notes ===
Hart had already played Lennon in the 1991 film The Hours and Times. Bakewell later reprised his role as McCartney in the 2000 television film The Linda McCartney Story. Williams reprised his role as Best in the 2000 television film In His Life: The John Lennon Story.

Freda Kelly was the Beatles' longtime secretary and the president of their official fan club during the 1960s and '70s.

== Production ==
=== Writing ===
The original script was written by Iain Softley based on a series of 1988 interviews. After failing to secure funding, screenwriter Stephen Ward was brought in to completely rewrite the script in 1993. Ward interviewed Astrid Kirchherr and others who were close to the Beatles during their time in Hamburg. The project was green-lit that year.

=== Filming ===
Although set in Hamburg, the film was mainly shot in London, aside from some location filming in the St. Pauli quarter.

=== Soundtrack ===
Due to the film's focus on the early days of the band, the soundtrack includes no songs written by members of the Beatles but various songs the group performed in Hamburg, written and recorded by other artists. In this respect, rather than re-create the sounds of the period, iconoclastic, rebellious musicians were recruited (as a producer noted, the Beatles' pre-recording stage act was "the punk of its day") to better convey the way the music was appreciated by audiences of the time. All musicians were members of contemporary American rock bands:

- Dave Pirner (Soul Asylum): vocals (Paul McCartney)
- Greg Dulli (The Afghan Whigs): vocals (John Lennon)
- Thurston Moore (Sonic Youth): guitar
- Don Fleming (Gumball): guitar
- Mike Mills (R.E.M.): bass guitar
- Dave Grohl (Nirvana): drums
- Henry Rollins (Black Flag): vocals (Stuart Sutcliffe)

The film's distributor happened to be PolyGram Filmed Entertainment which was then under common ownership with Polydor Records, the label that owned the rights to the Beatles' music from the Hamburg days.

== Release ==
The film premiered at the 1994 Sundance Film Festival. It opened on one screen in the West End of London on 1 April 1994 and was planned to expand to 59 screens in the UK the following week but ended up expanding wider to 211 screens. It was given a limited theatrical release in the United States, opening on 15 April. A DVD version was released by Universal in 2005.

=== Box office ===
The film grossed £25,912 in its opening weekend from one screen in London, finishing in seventh place at the London box office. It expanded to 211 screens in the UK the following week and grossed £433,669, finishing in fourth place at the UK box office. It went on to gross £1,870,001 ($3 million) in the United Kingdom. In the United States, it opened in 10 theatres and grossed $126,740 in its opening weekend. The following weekend it expanded to 209 theatres and moved up to 18th place at the US box office with a gross of $617,993. It went on to gross $2.4 million in the United States and Canada. In its opening week in Australia, it grossed $136,000 from 50 screens.

== Reception ==
=== Critical response ===
Backbeat holds a rating of 70% based on 40 reviews on Rotten Tomatoes, the review aggregator site. The site's consensus states, "Its overly pretentious and melodramatic leanings notwithstanding, Backbeat explores the beginnings of the Fab Four with striking authenticity, soaring rock 'n' roll verve, and a strong admiration for its subjects."

Peter Travers of Rolling Stone liked how the film captured the early 60s period through its visual style and use of music. Film critic Roger Ebert gave the film two out of four stars; although he thought the "dialogue has real wit", he felt the film is "never able to convince us there's a story there". David Bleiler, writing for the TLA Film and Video Guide, gave the film a score of four stars, praising the performances of Lee, Hart, and Dorff, and writing: "Though the many musical sequences are thrilling and have a life of their own, they are only a small part of the film's success, and these scenes are smartly complimented by bristling characterizations and finely tuned dramatics."

=== The Beatles and others ===
At the time of the film's release, Paul McCartney commented:

One of my annoyances about the film Backbeat is that they've actually taken my rock 'n' rollness off me. They give John the song "Long Tall Sally" to sing and he never sang it in his life. But now it's set in cement. It's like the Buddy Holly and Glenn Miller stories. The Buddy Holly Story does not even mention Norman Petty, and The Glenn Miller Story is a sugarcoated version of his life. Now Backbeat has done the same thing to the story of the Beatles. I was quite taken, however, with Stephen Dorff's astonishing performance as Stu.

Astrid Kirchherr praised the accuracy and detail of her relationship with Sutcliffe and the Beatles. The film received further positive responses from Julian Lennon, Pete Best, and Sutcliffe's sister, Pauline, who said, "I still think the director did a fabulous job. It's a good movie. If you like movies, it's a great movie."

== Stage adaptations ==
The film's original writer and director, Iain Softley, turned the screenplay of Backbeat into a theatrical production. It premiered at Glasgow's Citizens' Theatre on 9 February 2010 featuring a live band. In 2011 another stage version opened at the Duke of York's Theatre in London.

== See also ==
- Birth of the Beatles, a 1979 biopic covering the early years of the pre-fame Beatles.
- Nowhere Boy, a 2009 biopic focusing on the life of young John Lennon and the formation of The Quarrymen.
