= Lingasong Records =

British record label

Lingasong Records was a record label formed by Paul Murphy of Buk Records for the sole purpose of producing and marketing The Beatles' live album Live! at the Star-Club in Hamburg, Germany; 1962. The album was released in 1977 after The Beatles lost a court case to block it. Lingasong teamed up with other record labels for distribution of the album in various countries, and the songs themselves were later licensed to other record companies. In 1996, Lingasong released the album on CD, prompting another Beatles lawsuit; Lingasong lost the case in 1998, and agreed to stop all sales of the album and surrender the original tapes to The Beatles.
