= Rory Storm =

English musician (1938–1972)

- Photo by Astrid Kirchherr

Background information
- Born: Alan Ernest Caldwell; 7 January 1938; Stoneycroft, Liverpool, England
- Died: 28 September 1972 (aged 34) Broadgreen, Liverpool, England
- Genres: Skiffle; rock and roll
- Occupations: Musician, songwriter
- Instrument: Vocals
- Years active: 1958–1972
- Labels: Oriole; Parlophone; Rockstar
- Formerly of: Rory Storm and the Hurricanes

Rory Storm (born Alan Ernest Caldwell; 7 January 1938 – 28 September 1972) was an English musician and vocalist. Born in Liverpool, Storm was the singer and leader of Rory Storm and the Hurricanes, a Liverpudlian band who featured drummer Ringo Starr before he joined the Beatles.

The Hurricanes were one of the most popular acts on the Liverpool and Hamburg club scenes during their existence, although their attempt at a recording career was not successful. They released only two singles (and one additional compilation track) during their early 1960s heyday, and none of their material made the charts. Their second and final single was a version of the West Side Story song "America", and was produced by the Beatles' manager Brian Epstein.

== Early years ==
Rory Storm was the stage name of Alan Caldwell, born 7 January 1938, in Oakhill Park Estate, Stoneycroft, Liverpool to Violet (née Disley) and Ernest "Ernie" George W Caldwell. His father was a window cleaner by profession, and a part-time porter at the Broadgreen Hospital, often singing songs to patients. Storm had one sister, Iris Caldwell, who dated George Harrison when she was 12 (Harrison was then 14), and Paul McCartney, when she was 17. Iris later married Shane Fenton, later known as Alvin Stardust. Apart from music, Storm was interested in sports, particularly athletics; he ran for an amateur team in Liverpool, the Pembroke Harriers, and set the Pembroke Athletics and Cycle Club steeplechase record. Instead of being driven home after concerts in Liverpool, Storm preferred to run home.

Storm played football regularly and was a good skater and swimmer (once swimming the 12.5-mile length of Windermere). Liverpool F.C. used to train at Melwood and he went to watch them in training, later putting up a large photo of himself training with the team on his wall at home. He was the captain of Mersey Beat magazine's football team, called the Mersey Beat XI. Storm was born with a stammer (a speech impediment), which surprisingly did not affect his singing. Because of Storm's stammer, his friends never allowed him to tell a joke or to order a round of drinks, as it could take a long time. He became a cotton salesman (as was Paul McCartney's father, Jim) before forming a skiffle group.

== Music ==
Storm's first name for a group was "Dracula & the Werewolves", but he then settled on "Al Caldwell's Texans". Still known as Alan Caldwell, Storm opened the Morgue Skiffle Club in the cellar of a large Victorian house, "Balgownie", at 25 Oakhill Park, Broadgreen, on 13 March 1958. The cellar consisted of two rooms, painted black and connected by a long corridor, with skeletons painted on the walls and one blue light. Groups played on Tuesdays and Thursdays for up to 100 people (above the age of 15) starting at 7:30 pm, including Storm's group (later called "The Raving Texans") and the Quarrymen (who later became "the Beatles"). After complaints about the noise, the police closed down the club on 1 April 1958, but Storm reopened it on 22 April 1958. It was in the Morgue Skiffle Club that George Harrison auditioned for the Quarrymen, playing "Guitar Boogie Shuffle" by Bert Weedon before being admitted as a member of the band. Paul McCartney has stated that George Harrison auditioned for John Lennon on the top of a bus by playing "Raunchy". Harrison later asked Storm if he could join his group, but Storm's mother refused to allow it, as she thought Harrison was too young.

Storm went to London on 11 April 1958 to participate in a cross-country running competition. During his stay, he took part in a jam session at Chas McDevitt's Skiffle Cellar, which resulted in an appearance on 30 April 1958 on Radio Luxembourg's Skiffle club programme, playing "Midnight Special". In 1959, Storm's group consisted of himself, Paul Murphy, and Johnny Byrne (stage name "Johnny Guitar") all performing on guitar and vocals, Reg Hale (washboard) and Jeff Truman (tea-chest bass). "Spud" Ward, a former member of the Swinging Blue Jeans, later played bass guitar. Storm met Ringo Starr at a talent contest called "6.5 Special". Starr had previously played with the Eddie Clayton Skiffle Group and was then drumming with a group called "Darktown Skiffle". Starr's first concert with Storm was on 25 March 1959, at the Mardi Gras in Mount Pleasant, Liverpool.

=== Rory Storm and the Hurricanes ===
Storm changed the name of his group to "Al Storm and the Hurricanes", then "Jett Storm and the Hurricanes", and finally to "Rory Storm and the Hurricanes". Storm and the Hurricanes entered "Search for Stars", a competition managed by Carrol Levis, at the Liverpool Empire Theatre on 11 October 1959, reaching second place ahead of 150 acts. The line-up of the Hurricanes finally solidified with Storm (vocals), Guitar (guitar), and Starr (drums). They were joined by Walter "Wally" Eymond (bass guitar), who went by "Lu Walters" on-stage, and Charles "Chaz" O'Brien (guitar), who went by "Ty O'Brien" on-stage The group played at the Cavern Club with the Cy Laurie Jazz Band on Sunday 3 January 1960, and a week later supported the Saints Jazz Band and Terry Lightfoot's New Orleans Jazz Band. Playing rock 'n' roll music was a problem at the Cavern Club, as it was not accepted by the customers or management. When Storm and the Hurricanes performed there on 17 January 1960, with Micky Ashman's Jazz Band and the Swinging Blue Jeans, their first song was "Cumberland Gap" (a skiffle song) by Lonnie Donegan. Then they played "Whole Lotta Shakin' Goin On" by Jerry Lee Lewis. The jazz and skiffle audience were outraged, booed and threw copper coins at the group. The Cavern's manager, Ray McFall, fined them six shillings, but the coins collected from the stage floor were worth more than the fine.

Storm and the Hurricanes performed at the Liverpool Stadium on 3 May 1960, on the same bill as Gene Vincent. Larry Parnes became interested in the Hurricanes, and invited them to audition at the Wyvern Club as a backing group for Billy Fury. Storm turned up at the audition, but only so he could have his picture taken with Fury. In July 1960, the group secured a residency at Butlins holiday camp in Pwllheli (playing in the Rock 'n' Calypso Ballroom) for £25 each per week (equivalent to £500 in 2025). Starr was not sure about giving up his job as an apprentice at Henry Hunt's, where he made climbing frames for schools, until Storm put forward the idea of "Starr-time" (a solo spot) with Starr singing songs like "Boys" by the Shirelles. Starr finally agreed when Storm told him about how many women would be "available". It was during this season that Starr (who had been known as "Ritchie" until then) changed his name to "Ringo".

=== Hamburg ===
After playing for more than 16 hours per week, the group were contacted by Allan Williams, who wanted them to go to Hamburg. Derry and the Seniors were successful there, and Williams wanted an additional group. As Storm and the group were committed to Butlins, they turned Williams' offer down (as did Gerry and the Pacemakers), so Williams sent the Beatles to Hamburg instead. After the summer season ended in early October 1960, Storm and the Hurricanes were free to travel to Hamburg, replacing Derry and the Seniors at the Kaiserkeller. They arrived in Hamburg on 1 October 1960, having negotiated to be paid more than the Seniors or the Beatles. They played five or six 90-minute sets every day, alternating with the Beatles. Storm and the Hurricanes were later presented with a special certificate by Bruno Koschmider (the owner of the Kaiserkeller) for their performances.

The stage of the Kaiserkeller was made of planks of wood balanced on the top of beer crates, so the two groups made a bet to see to who would be the first to break it. After punishing the stage for days, a slight crack appeared, and when Storm jumped off the top of the upright piano, during a performance of "Blue Suede Shoes", it finally broke. Guitar remembered that as Storm hit the stage, it cracked loudly and formed a V-shape around Storm. He disappeared into it, and all the amplifiers and Starr's cymbals slid into the hole. Koschmider was furious and had to replace the live music with a jukebox. Both groups went across the road to Harold's Cafe for breakfast but were followed by Koschmider's doormen with coshes, who beat the musicians as punishment.

During their eight-week residency, Williams arranged a recording session at the Akoustik Studio, which was a small booth on the fifth floor of 57 Kirchenallee (the Klockmann-House) on Saturday, 18 October 1960. Williams asked John Lennon, Paul McCartney and Harrison from the Beatles to play and sing harmonies for Walters (of the Hurricanes) on the recording. Pete Best (the Beatles' regular drummer at the time) was in town buying drumsticks, so Starr played drums, which was the first time that the classic Beatles line-up of Lennon, McCartney, Harrison and Starr recorded together. They recorded three songs: "Fever", "September Song", and "Summertime". However, the fate of the recordings is uncertain and they have not been discovered.

=== Liverpool ===
Storm and the Hurricanes were the headlining group at the first "Beat Night" in the Orrell Park Ballroom in March 1961. They were also invited for a season at the Butlins camp in Pwllheli North Wales. Sam Leach (a Liverpool promoter) arranged a series of dance nights at the Palais Ballroom in Aldershot, starting on 9 December 1961. The first Saturday featured the Beatles, but as the local newspaper forgot to run the advertisement, only 18 people turned up. The second Saturday was arranged for Rory Storm and the Hurricanes to perform, and as it was advertised this time, 210 people paid to get in. Leach's idea was to attract London agents to watch the series of concerts, but when he realised they would never travel out of London, he abandoned the idea.

Starr considered leaving Storm at that time to join Derry and the Seniors but accepted a job with Tony Sheridan at the Top Ten Club on 30 December 1961, as Sheridan's offer of more money, a flat, and a car was too good to refuse. Starr's stay with Sheridan was short-lived, as he found Sheridan's habit of changing the set list without telling his backing group beforehand frustrating, so he rejoined the Hurricanes. On 5 February 1962, Best fell ill and the Beatles had to play a lunchtime concert at the Cavern and an evening concert at the Kingsway club in Southport. As the Hurricanes had no concert that day, Starr played with them live on stage for the first time (although he had recorded with them in Hamburg).

During a Hurricanes' residency at Butlins, Lennon and McCartney drove from Liverpool to Pwllheli North Wales on 15 August 1962 to ask Starr to join the Beatles. Shortly before, Starr had agreed to join Kingsize Taylor in Hamburg, as Taylor was offering £20 a week (equivalent to £400 in 2025), but Lennon and McCartney offered £25 a week (equivalent to £500 in 2025), which Starr accepted. Lennon and McCartney offered Storm to swap drummers (with Best replacing Starr) but Best who was distraught after just being kicked out of the Beatles rejected the idea. According to Epstein in his autobiography, Storm was "One of the liveliest and most likeable young men on the scene ... was very annoyed when Ringo left, and he complained to me. I apologised, and Rory, with immense good humour, said, 'Okay. Forget it. The best of luck to the lot of you.'" The Hurricanes then became known for having a succession of drummers, including Gibson Kemp, Brian Johnson, Keef Hartley (August 1963), Ian Broad and Trevor Morais, who all stayed with the group for a short period before leaving.

Despite Starr joining the Beatles, both groups would perform on the same bill during 1962 and at many concerts thereafter. In 1962, both groups performed together at St Patrick's Night Rock Gala (Knotty Ash Village Hall), Queen's Hall (Widnes), and with Little Richard at the Tower Ballroom. In 1963, Storm and the Hurricanes were filmed as part of the "Beat City" documentary, which was broadcast by Associated-Rediffusion Television.

== Stage persona and lifestyle ==
When Storm became a professional singer, he legally changed his name to Rory Storm by deed poll, and changed the name of his family's home in Broadgreen to Hurricaneville (the house name has often been remembered as Stormsville, even by his sister Iris, but was registered with the Post Office as Hurricaneville and appeared that way in the telephone directory).

Storm was known for the extravagant clothes he wore and the cars he drove, once buying a pink Vauxhall Cresta for over £800 in cash. A young man was once caught by a porter at Bootle railway station writing "I love Rory" over the walls, and when questioned, it turned out to be Storm himself. The Hurricanes wore matching suits on stage, but Storm sometimes wore a pink suit and pink tie, and during concerts, he would walk to the piano and comb his blond hair with an oversized comb. Their stage wear changed from sunglasses and palm tree-decorated shirts to red (and blue) suits. Storm also wore an Elvis-style gold lamé suit. When they first appeared at Butlins holiday camp Storm wore a turquoise suit with a gold lamé shirt, while the group wore fluorescent suits.

Rod Pont (also known as Steve Day in Steve Day and the Drifters) remembered Storm arriving at the Orrell Park Ballroom for a concert with a boil on his face. When told about it, Storm pulled out a black velvet hood which had slits for his eyes and mouth, and played the whole concert with the hood on. At one concert at Bankfield House Youth club, Garston, Liverpool, in 1965, the stage lighting failed between sets. Storm was upset until someone walked in with a torch, which Storm used to finish the concert. He occasionally used a pet monkey in some of the group's performances, as it attracted more people. At a New Brighton swimming baths performance for 1,600 people in 1963, Storm climbed to the top diving board, undressed to a pair of swimming trunks, and then dived into the water at the end of a song. In January 1964, during a performance at the Majestic Ballroom, Birkenhead, he climbed up one of the columns supporting the balcony but slipped and fell 30 feet (9 m) to the floor below, fracturing his leg. At another performance on the New Brighton Pier, Storm made his way onto the Pavilion roof but fell through the glass skylight.

Storm and the Hurricanes received the most votes in the first Mersey Beat magazine poll, but many votes were disqualified as they had been posted from the same place at the same time and were written in green ink; although never proven, it was thought that Storm had posted the votes. This meant that the Beatles reached the top position, with the Hurricanes coming fourth, even though the Beatles had also been sending in extra votes themselves. Storm was often photographed for the magazine, such as being surrounded by nurses when he left the hospital after breaking a leg during a performance, or playing for the Mersey Beat XI football team.

== The Hurricanes' set list ==
The group's typical 40-minute set list during 1963/1964:

- "Brand New Cadillac" – Storm, vocals (Vince Taylor & the Playboys);
- "Roll Over Beethoven" – Storm, vocals (Chuck Berry);
- "I'll Be Your Hero" – Storm, vocals (Vince Taylor & the Playboys);
- "Beautiful Dreamer" – Walters, vocals (Stephen Foster, rewritten by Gerry Goffin and Jack Keller and released by Tony Orlando in January 1963);
- "Since You Broke My Heart" – Walters/Guitar, vocals (The Everly Brothers);
- "America" – Storm, vocals (Leonard Bernstein);
- "Danny" – Storm, vocals (Marty Wilde);
- "Green Onions" (instrumental) (Booker T & the MG's);
- "Down the Line" – Storm, vocals (Jerry Lee Lewis); and
- "Whole Lotta Shakin' Goin On" – Storm, vocals (Jerry Lee Lewis).

Other songs included in the set were:

- "Fever" – Walters, vocals (written by Eddie Cooley and John Davenport – a pseudonym for Otis Blackwell);
- "Let It Be Me" – Walters, vocals (The Everly Brothers);
- "Summertime" – Walters, vocals (George Gershwin); and
- "Dr Feelgood" – Storm, vocals (Dr. Feelgood & The Interns)

The Hurricanes recorded songs for Oriole's two This is Mersey Beat albums but released only two singles: "Dr Feelgood"/"I Can Tell", Oriole (45-CB 1858 12/63) and "America"/"Since You Broke My Heart", Parlophone (R 5197 11/64), which was produced by Epstein at IBC Studios in London. Epstein also sang backing vocals on "America", and Starr added percussion and sang. Storm later asked Epstein to manage the group, but Epstein refused. The Hurricanes later recorded two songs at Abbey Road Studios in 1964: "Ubangi Stomp" and "I'll Be There", although they were never released.

== Final years and death ==
In 1967, Storm's guitarist, Ty O'Brien, collapsed in his home and was taken to a hospital where he would die from complications after an appendicitis operation at the age of 26. Storm and his guitarist Johnny briefly attempted to revive the band with three new members but it ultimately failed and the Hurricanes were permanently disbanded. After his band broke up, Storm became a disc jockey, working at the Silver Blades Ice Rink in Liverpool, in Benidorm, Spain (he was also a water-skiing instructor there), and in Jersey and Amsterdam. When Storm's father unexpectedly died, he returned from Amsterdam to Liverpool to be with his mother. He developed a chest infection and could not sleep properly, so he took sleeping pills. On 28 September 1972, Storm and his mother were both found dead at Hurricaneville. The postmortem revealed that Storm had alcohol and sleeping pills in his blood (as had his mother), but not enough to cause his death, which was ruled accidental. Although it could not be proven, it is thought that his mother took her own life after finding Storm's body.

The funeral for Storm and his mother was at Oakvale Congregational Church, Broadgreen, on 19 October 1972. Mourners sang Storm's favourite song, "You'll Never Walk Alone". The two coffins were carried from the hearse to the cremation (at Anfield Crematorium) by former band members. Storm's remains were scattered on section 23 at Anfield Crematorium's Gardens of Remembrance. None of the Beatles attended Storm's funeral. When Starr was asked why he did not attend, he quipped, "I wasn't there when he was born either." Although Starr had often offered to arrange for Storm to record whenever he wanted to, Storm was not interested in finding new or original material. His sister said: "He [Storm] was happy to be the King of Liverpool – he was never keen on touring, he didn't want to give up running for the Pembroke Harriers ... and he'd never miss a Liverpool match!"

Billy Fury, whom Storm had met at the Wyvern Club auditions, later played the part of a fictional singer called Stormy Tempest (based on Storm), in the film That'll Be the Day (1973), which also starred Starr. In 1987, a musical was staged in Liverpool about Storm and the Hurricanes called A Need for Heroes.

After spending several years in the North West Ambulance Service, Johnny Guitar died in Liverpool on 18 August 1999 at the age of fifty nine years old. Lu Walters died on 19 July 2022.

== Legacy ==
Ringo Starr pays tribute to him in his songs "Liverpool 8" on his Liverpool 8 album and "Rory and the Hurricanes" on his Postcards from Paradise album.

== Posthumous release ==
In September 2012, it was reported that a reel-to-reel tape of a complete concert by Rory Storm and the Hurricanes, from 5 March 1960 at Liverpool's Jive Hive, had been unearthed in the basement of his sister Iris Caldwell's house. The recording was released on CD as Rory Storm and the Hurricanes Live at the Jive Hive – March 1960. The concert had been professionally recorded in mono by radio engineers with a recording microphone added onto Rory Storm's concert mic stand, but only one mic for the entire band. The diary of Storm's guitarist Johnny Guitar reveals that, in the week of the recording, Ringo Starr was ill, and historian Mark Lewisohn has stated that the drumming on the recording is nothing like Starr's. Four home demos were also included on the CD release.

== Discography ==
(releases by Rory Storm and the Hurricanes)

=== Singles ===
- 1963 – "Dr. Feel Good" b/w "I Can Tell", Oriole, CB 1858
- 1964 – "America" b/w "Since You Broke My Heart", Parlophone, R 5197

=== Albums ===
- 2012 – Live at the Jive Hive March 1960, Rockstar Records, RSRCD 033

=== Compilations ===
- 1963 – This Is Merseybeat, Volume 1, Oriole, PS 40047 (tracks: "Dr. Feelgood" and "Beautiful Dreamer")
- 1963 – This Is Merseybeat, Volume 2, Oriole, PS 40048 (tracks: "I Can Tell")
- 1974 – Mersey Beat: 1962–64, United Artists, US$305 (tracks: "I Can Tell", "Dr. Feelgood")
- 2004 – Unearthed Merseybeat, Volume 2, Viper CD-027 (tracks: "Lend Me Your Comb")
