= Molotow Club =

Music venue in Hamburg, Germany

Coordinates: 53.549°N 9.959°W

Molotow
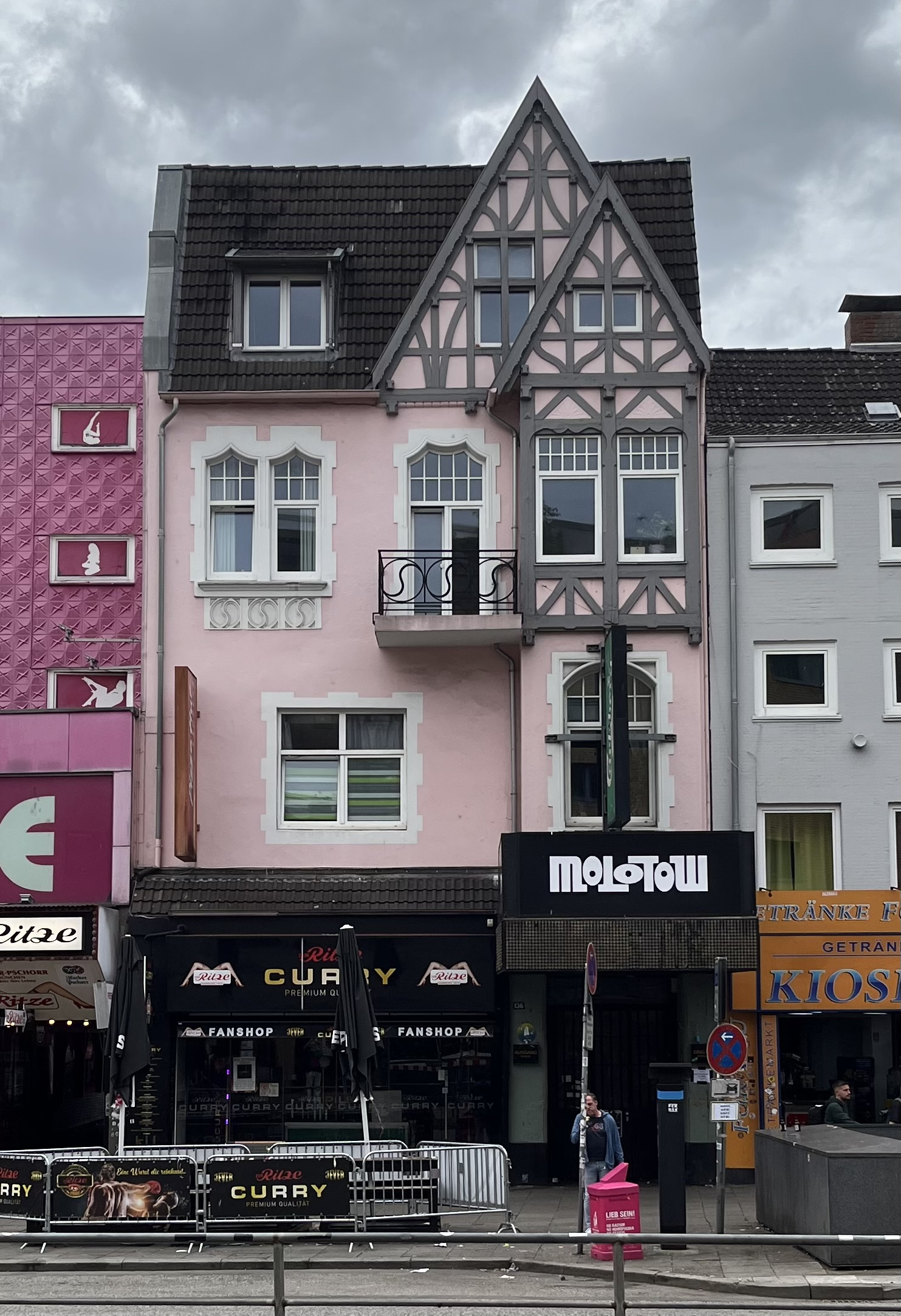
- Molotow (formerly Top Ten Club)
- Interactive map of Molotow
- Address: Reeperbahn 136; 20359 Hamburg; Germany
- Owner: privately owned
- Seating type: Standing
- Capacity: 850
- Type: Music venue, Nightclub
- Events: rock 'n' roll, punk rock, indie rock, alternative rock
- Public transit: Reeperbahn (exit: Talstr.)

Construction
- Opened: August 1990
- Demolished: 2013

Website
- Molotow's official website

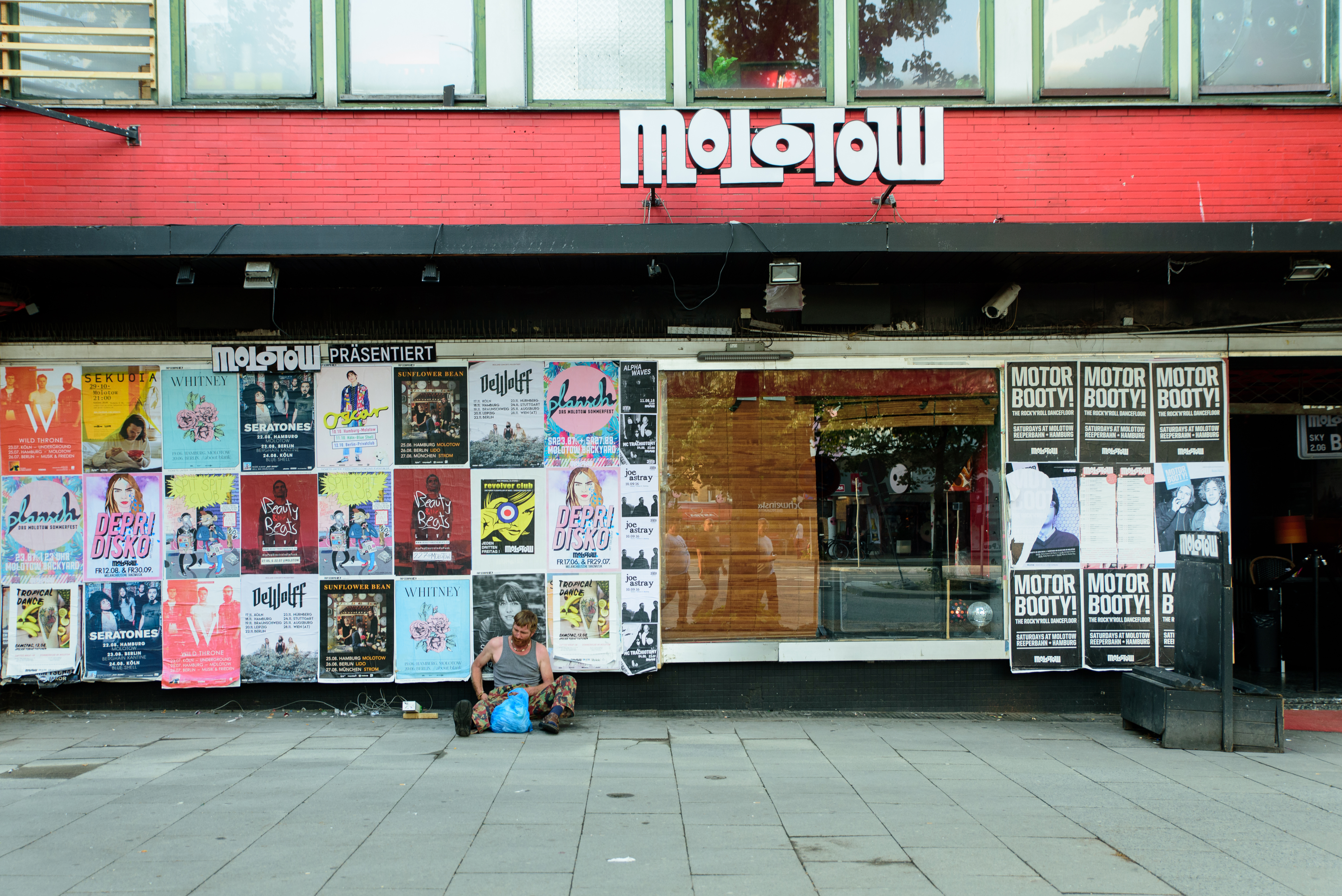
Molotow 2016, Nobistor location

The Molotow music club is one of the most famous and popular live music venues in Germany. Since March 2025, it is located on Reeperbahn 136, in St. Pauli, Hamburg.

The venue has a second smaller stage in the basement called Top Ten Bar, named in honor of the Top Ten Club.

The Molotow won numerous "Club of the year" and "Best National live music Venue" awards. Intro magazine has the Molotow in their Best Club-Top 5 list regularly. Biggest German music paper Musikexpress named it third best club.

== History ==
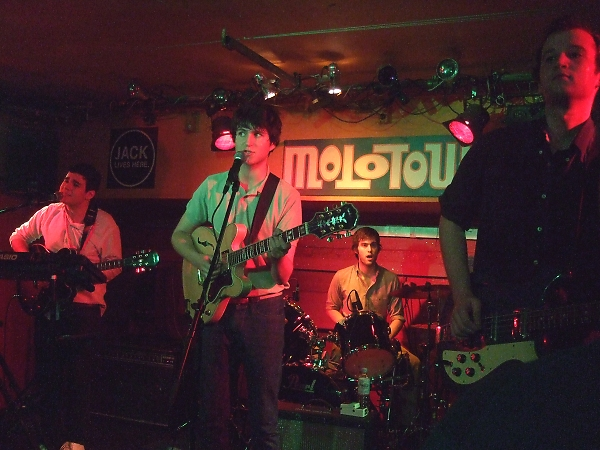
Vampire Weekend performing at the Molotow, 2007

The Molotow is internationally acknowledged and has established a reputation for showcasing new talent and hosting many well-known bands' first shows at the beginning of their careers such as The Killers, The White Stripes, The Black Keys or Mumford & Sons and is noted for being a stepping stone for bands before they get famous. Others who have played gigs at Molotow early in their careers include Vampire Weekend, Biffy Clyro, Idles, The Hives, LCD Soundsystem, St. Vincent, The National and Imagine Dragons. The magazine Vice wrote: "Without the Molotow Rock'n'Roll in Hamburg would be lost long ago."

The Molotow was a hot spot for a 1990s German indie rock movement going by the name of Hamburger Schule. One of those bands, "Muff Potter", recorded a tribute song about the club entitled "Wir sitzen so vorm Molotow" which means "We're just hanging in front of the Molotow".

Hellacopters frontman Nicke Andersson said in 2005 when asked why he played at a small location like Molotow: "Rock 'n' roll is not made to be viewed with binoculars from a great distance, or on large screens".

In 2013 the building where the club was located got demolished and the Molotow moved to the other end of the Reeperbahn to Nobistor, next to the Beatles-Platz.

In 2016 a book about the Molotow by Sebastian Meissner was published by Junius Verlag.

During the COVID-19 pandemic in 2020 Frank Turner played an exclusive online stream show to help the Molotow during the crisis.

In December 2023, the Molotow received notice of termination from the location's tenant and was ordered to vacate it by 30 June 2024 at the latest. There was a solidarity demonstration, also covered by nationwide #1 evening news show Tagesschau, to support the Molotow on December 30th 2023 with several thousand people in front of the club. Ultimately, a temporary extension of the lease until December 31, 2024 was negotiated with the support of Hamburg's senator for culture and media, and the borough Hamburg Mitte.

In March 2025 the club moved to the old Top Ten Club location. The building was leased until at least 2037 by Hamburg Kreativ Gesellschaft, a public agency promoting creative industries in the city of Hamburg, and appropriate rooms were sublet to the Molotow.
