= Top Ten Club =

Former music club in Hamburg's St. Pauli district

Coordinates: 53.5498°N 9.9595°E

The Top Ten Club was a music club in Hamburg's St. Pauli district at Reeperbahn 136, which opened on 31 October 1960 and kept its name until 1994.

In 1961, the Beatles performed 92 times at the Top Ten Club.

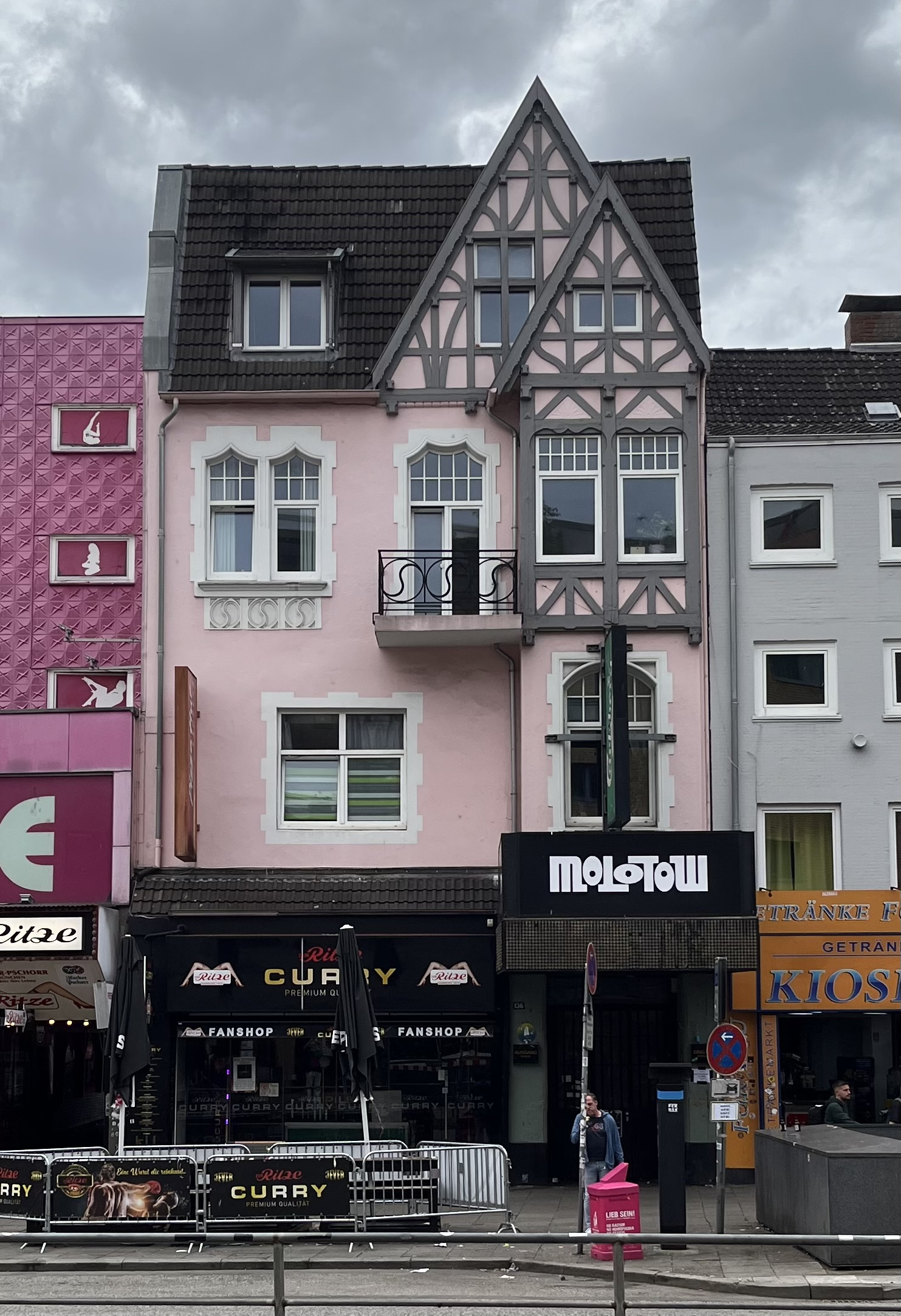
The Molotow Club in the former Top Ten Club

== History ==
At the beginning of the 20th century, Reeperbahn 136 was the location of the Grand Hippodrom and Café of Carl Richter Later it was called Hippodrom and belonged, together with the bar, to Herbert Eckhorn. In 1960, the heir to the hippodrome, Peter Eckhorn (* 12 February 1939 in Hamburg; † 19 May 1979), decided to close the hippodrome, rebuild it and reopen it with a new name as a music club. The Top Ten Club was opened on 31 October 1960 by Peter Eckhorn and his manager Horst Fascher. After disagreements, Peter Eckhorn separated from Horst Fascher shortly afterwards. Fascher then worked as a waiter in a restaurant in the Große Freiheit, where he persuaded Manfred Weissleder to turn the former Stern cinema into a music club, the Star-Club, becoming his manager.

== The Beatles ==
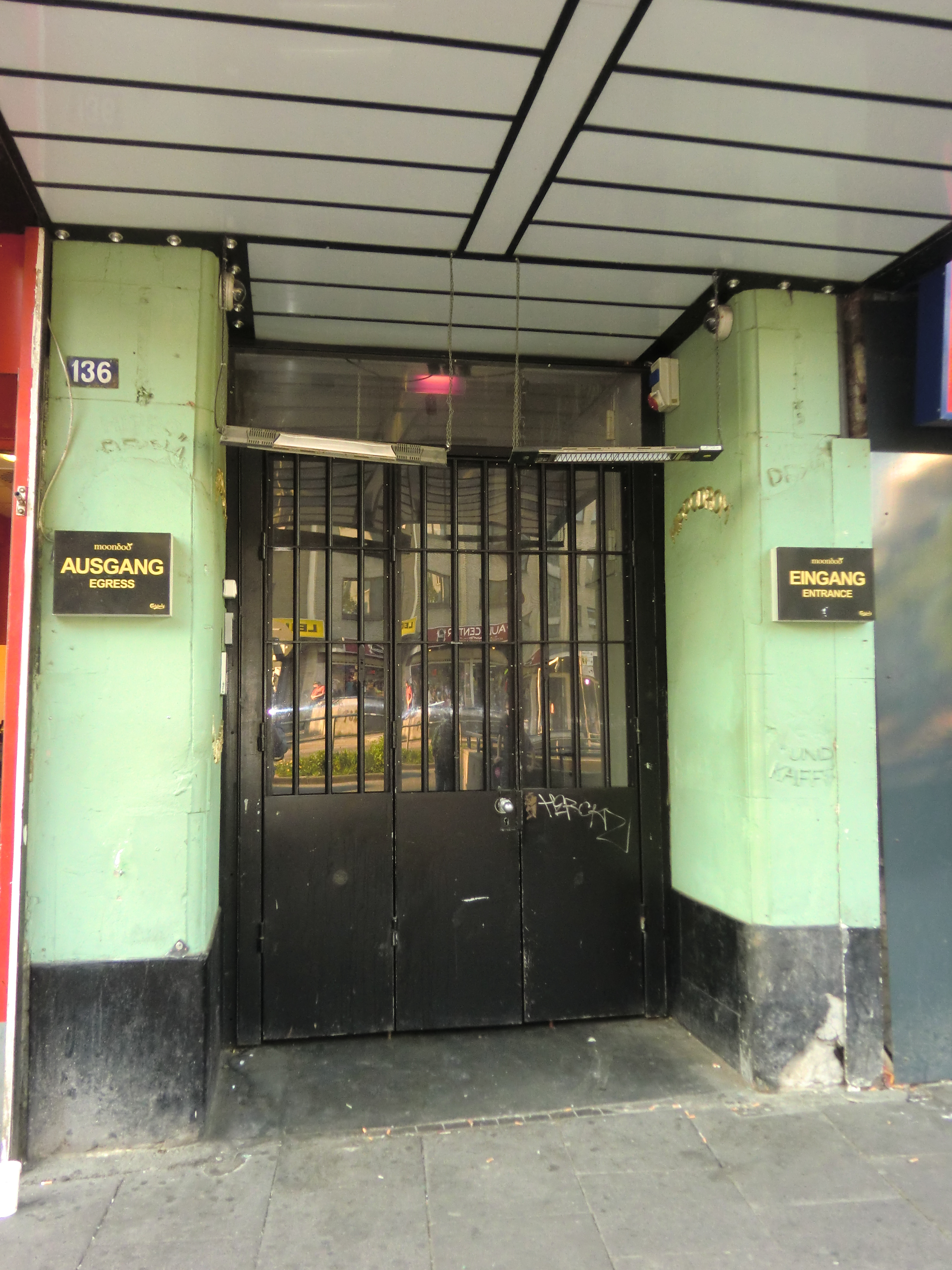
The Top Ten Club's former entrance on Reeperbahn (2011)

The Beatles, who until 31 December 1960 were under contract with Bruno Koschmider, the owner of Kaiserkeller, often visited Top Ten Club, where the Jets (from London, with Tony Sheridan) performed. They also played together occasionally, which Bruno Koschmider found out about. On November 21, 1960 George Harrison was deported to England by the police, because at the age of 17 he was too young to work in a nightclub after midnight. It is assumed that it was Bruno Koschmider who tipped off the police because he was annoyed that the Beatles were unfaithful to him and wanted to switch to the Top Ten Club. Consequently, Harrison had to return to Liverpool.

On 29 November 1960, Paul McCartney and Pete Best were arrested for attempted arson. They were said to have set fire to a condom when they packed their personal belongings in Bruno Koschmider's Bambi cinema, where they slept, to bring them to the Top Ten Club. Best and McCartney spent three hours in the Davidwache Police Station, and were deported on 1 December 1960. Lennon returned to Liverpool on 10 December, with Sutcliffe following in February 1961.

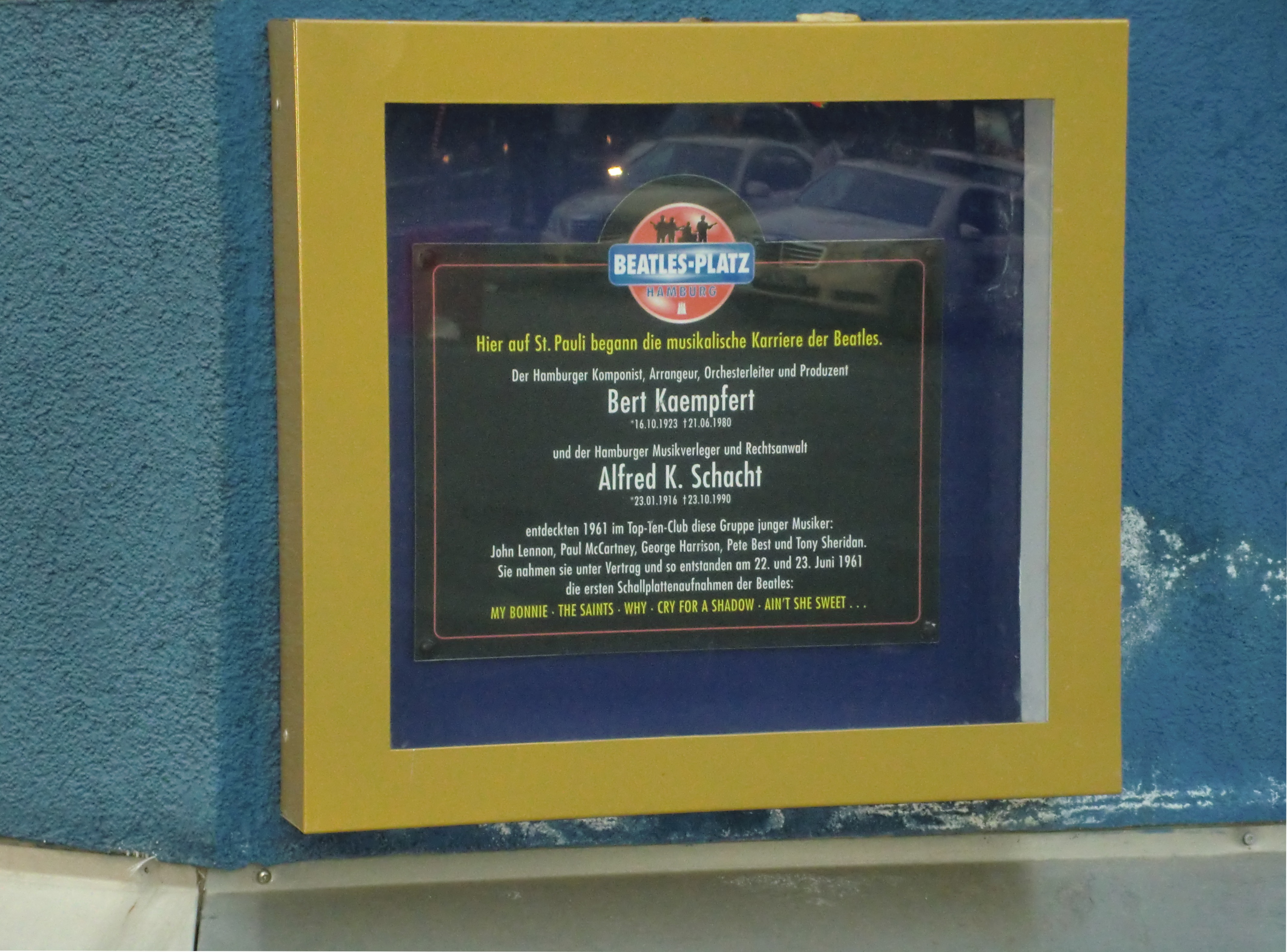
Plaque on Beatles-Platz, commemorating the discovery of the Beatles and Sheridan in the Top Ten Club by Kaempfert and Schacht

The Beatles appeared back at the Top Ten Club with Tony Sheridan from 1 April to 1 July 1961; together they performed there for 92 nights consecutively. They were to play a total of 503 hours on stage, playing seven hours a night and eight hours at weekends, with a fifteen-minute pause every hour. Each member of The Beatles was to be paid 35 deutschmarks.

Peter Brüchmann documented the Beatles' visit to the Top Ten Club in 1961, though his report did not appear in Quick until 1966. Gerd Mingram photographed the Beatles by chance when he commissioned a trade union newspaper in the Top Ten Club. Some of the photos were sold in the mid-seventies to Paul McCartney for £30,000.

== Other bands ==
- Summer Set among whose members was Les Humphries who went on to 'discover' Boney-M, marry a Yugoslav princess and lead the South German equivalent of a James Last Band. It is believed to be his first band since leaving the Royal Marines. He subsequently stayed in Germany and founded the "Les Humphries Singers". Also in the band was Chris Manders, who returned in a new band a few months later (The Decadent Streak) see below.
- Bluesology Feb 1966 one of the bands was allegedly, according to what was carved into the woodwork, everywhere, featuring a keyboard player named Reg Dwight who grew up to be Elton John.
- The Decadent Streak, who went on to become "THE FLIES" featuring Robin Hunt (drums), John DaCosta (guitar), George Haywood (guitar), Chris Manders (guitar) and by no means least Ian Baldwin (bass), all taking a part on vocals. They played there for the month of May in 1966 before going across town the play for two weeks at the ‘ Big Apple Club’.
- The Jets Iain Hines (Founder/Keyboards) Pete Wharton (bass), Colin Melander (guitar), Tony Sheridan (guitar), Rick Hardy (guitar).
- Next of Kin South Wales Rock Group (Ebbw Vale) Frankie Allan (vocals) Robert Evans (bass) Dai Johns (Lead Guitar) Mike Ashman (Rhythm Guitar) Alan Snell (drums) played there 1965 lived in the attic above the club
- Dave Dee, Dozy, Beaky, Mick & Tich
- 1968 Cherry Blossom Clinic. Blackpool Band. Mike Proctor (organ and vocals) Colin Hartley (Guitar and vocals) Stewart Bain (Frontman, vocals and Rhythm guitar) Mike Bain (Bass) Tony Morley (Drums) (later became Innocent Chilḍ / Stewart Bain (Lead Vocals) Mike Bain (Bass) Peter Morris"Sprog"(Lead Guitar) Ronnie Brambles (Drums) went on to play at The Star Club, all over Europe and the UK
- The Blackjacks Pat Harris (Vocals), Don Callard (Lead Guitar), Robbie Williams (Rhythm and Vocals), Bob Wilkinson (Bass) and Pete James (Drums) - March, 1963 then Moved onto Top Ten Club, Hannover.
- Universe. South-Wales rock band. Played 5 residencies at the TOP TEN between May 1970 and August 1971. Members: Michael Blanche, Steve Finn, John Healan, Mike Lloyd-Jones and Rob Reynolds.(Pete Hurley, Steve Keeley, Phil Summers, Colin Galton)
- Harvest (Teesside, UK).Played the Top Ten Club with Universe in May 1970. Harvest were a 7-piece band with Colin Bilton(Vocals), John Rogers(Bass/Vocals), John “Collie” Collins(Drums), John Rhodes(Guitar), Paul Rhucroft(Tenor Sax), Vic Hall(Valve Trombone) and John Taylor(Trumpet). Ricky Barnes booked Harvest after band auditions held at a club in Sunderland.
- Still Earth (Bristol, UK): Phill Crowther (Drums), John Pearce (Vocals), Dave Pratt(Bass), John Cannon(Sax), and two other members on guitars. The bands dormed at the Atlantic Hotel annex at that time. Ricky Barnes was still managing the club.
- Aarons Rod, a Birmingham band, played around April/May 1970 along with Still Earth
- Strawberry Dust (later became Racing Cars) South Wales rock band, February 1971. Members: Morty, Graham Williams, Jack Bass and Dicky Owen.
- Quicksand South Wales rock band. 1971. Members: Phil Davies, Jimmy Davies, Jeff Hooper, Anthony Stone and Rob Collins.
- The Mastersounds - Liverpool R & B Combo - Mal Jefferson (Leader/ Bass/ Vocals), Adrian Lord (Vocals), Tony Cockayne (Guitar ES.175), Mike Price (Drums), Gerry Stewart (Tenor Sax), usually augmented by Ricky Barnes (In-House Tenor Sax Player) and Isobel Bond (In-House Vocals). Occasionally augmented by Iain Hines (Keyboards) and Jimmy Doyle (Drums). August 1964. Sweet Marriage 1969 Tony Merrick, Alan Doyle, Tony Macdonald, Ronnie. They met Sean Connery and the Krupp Brothers in the club. They also were recorded by the secret in-house studio operated by Iain Hines. The songs were released on 45 rpm singles and they had a number of German Juke Box Hits including a No. 1 with 'Ooh My Soul!' - vocal by Mal Jefferson. The records were released on the club's own 'Top Ten' record label.
- The Smokeless Zone (Formerly also known as "The Jets") “Plum” Hollis (vocals), Deke Leonard (guitar), Martin Ace (bass), Beau Adams and later Terry Williams (drums), with guest appearances by Tony Sheridan
- Oswald Orange. South Wales rock band. February 1971. Members: Alice Ennis (guitar), Jeff Smith (guitar), Pete Smith (bass, vocals), John Russon (drums)
- Wayne Gibson & The Dynamic Sounds. South London rock band. Played from 1st Nov, 1961 to Jan, 1962. Wayne Gibson (vocals), Mick Todman (lead guitar), Ray Rogers (bass), Pete Gillies (rhythm guitar) and Larry Cole (drums).
- Mustard Cheshire rock band 1971. Members: Alan Williamson, Rick Shaw, Alan Hopkins (16 yrs), Melvyn Allen, Kenny Jones.
- The Berkeley Squares Leicester rock Band played The Top Ten in Autumn 1967 and stayed in The Auto Park Hotel 5 minutes walk away. Members were Barry Wade (vocals), Ray Martinez (lead guitar & vocals), Dave Eldredge (keyboard, guitar & vocals), Leigh Catterall (bass guitar & vocals) & Terry Abbs (drums).
- The Frank Sheen Sound 1966 March. Frank Sheen (vocals), John Cushen (bass), John Herridge (drums), Jeff Condon (trumpet), T.J. Huggett (organ).
- Axis Welsh band Based in New Port, played here in 71 Band members where Michael J. Downey (guitar & vocals)
- The John Mcflare Band a Scottish Band based in Birmingham played here in 69 and 70 Band members were Denis Mcnulty (guitar & vocals) John Mcnulty (Bass guitar & vocals) Eric Mcnulty (tenor sax) Robert Sweryda (tenor sax) Mick Mcnulty (drums)
- Colour Supplement a band from Stoke lead vocal was Hutch. Ricky Barnes was the guy running the club at that time.
- The Federation 7 piece Soul, Motown, blues, Pop harmony band from Bristol. Band Lineup: On lead vocals: Marilyn Ross, Roger Whatley (aka Woffle) Alan Holmes (Guitar/vocals) (later joined "Marmalade") Paul Ross (base/vocals) John Mileham (keyboards/vocals) Frank Chlebko (tenor sax/vocals) Kieron Ross (drums/vocals. Many visits in the early 70s Had a minor hit on EMI records with "Scallywag" 1974. B-side " Breakaway" was penned by band member Frank Chlebko.

== Afterwards ==
Since 1994 there have been about ten changes of ownership, and the club name has changed just as often. The names adopted were: MC-Music Club, new Top Ten Club, Soap Opera, The Irish Harp, La Cage (1997 to 2001), Titty Twister (a name based on the bar Titty Twister in the film From Dusk Till Dawn, from 2002 to 2003), Golden Stars (2003), Glam (2003 to 2005) and La Rocca (2005 to 2006).

From 2008 to 2024 the name has been Moondoo, and the operator is "Lago Bay Betriebsgesellschaft mbH". In March 2025 the Molotow Club opened at the location.

In 1994, the London Club Dome, in Tufnell Park in the London Borough of Islington district, was transformed into the Top Ten Club for the film Backbeat.
