= Star-Club =

Music club on Große Freiheit street in Hamburg's St. Pauli district, West Germany

Coordinates: 53°33′04″N 9°57′28″E

The Star-Club
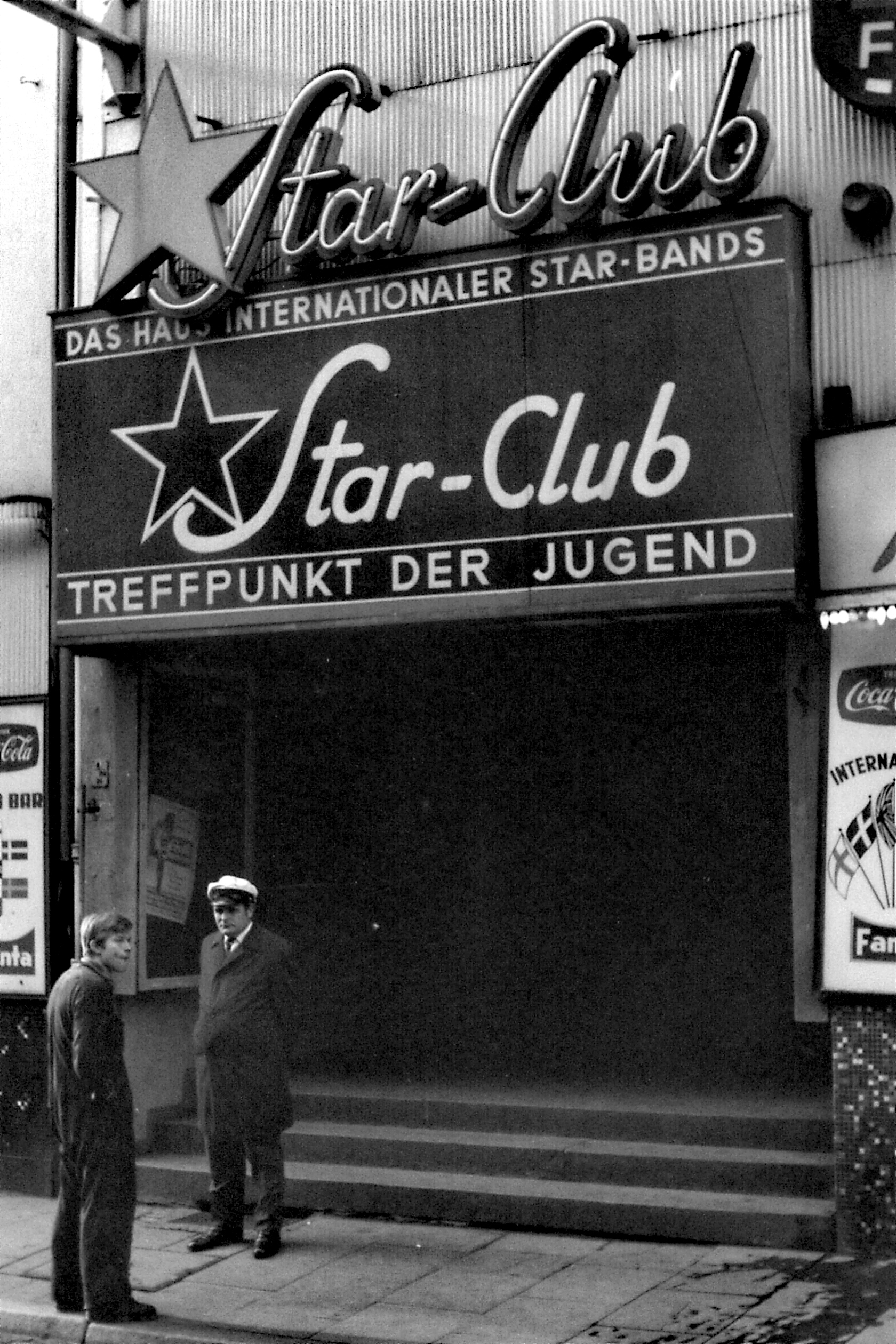
- Entrance to the Star-Club, Hamburg, 1968
- Interactive map of The Star-Club
- Location: Hamburg, Germany
- Owner: Manfred Weissleder and Horst Fascher
- Capacity: 2,000
- Type: Nightclub, music venue
- Event: Rock and roll
- Public transit: Reeperbahn

Construction
- Opened: 1962
- Closed: 1969

The Star-Club was a music club in Hamburg, Germany, that opened on Friday 13 April 1962. It was initially operated by Manfred Weissleder and Horst Fascher. In the 1960s, many of the giants of rock music played at the club. The Star-Club closed on 31 December 1969, and the building it had occupied was destroyed by a fire in 1987. The address of the club was Große Freiheit 39 in the St. Pauli quarter of Hamburg. Große Freiheit is a side street of the Reeperbahn. The club had a capacity of 2,000 people, and cinema-style seating.

The club achieved worldwide renown through the performances of the Beatles, who played three residencies there between April and December 1962. An amateur tape recording of one of the performances (or parts of several performances) during their December engagement was remixed and released in 1977 as Live! at the Star-Club in Hamburg, Germany; 1962. The club remained a popular venue for British and American rock and roll acts through the mid-1960s; its success was such that it spun off a record label bearing the Star-Club name that operated from 1964 to 1966, often recording acts who performed at the club.

== Musicians who played at Star-Club ==
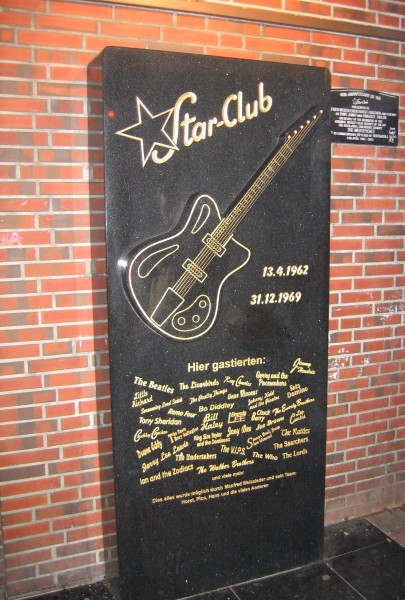
The Star-Club memorial in St. Pauli, Germany

List of musicians who played in the Star-Club:

- American musicians:
  - Ray Charles
  - Bo Diddley
  - Fats Domino
  - Everly Brothers
  - Goldie and the Gingerbreads
  - Bill Haley
  - Jimi Hendrix
  - Johnny and the Hurricanes
  - Brenda Lee
  - Jerry Lee Lewis (who released a highly praised live album recorded at the club in 1964)
  - Little Richard, who at that point had Billy Preston in his band
  - The Monks, with Gary Burger played at the Top Ten Club a number of times in 1965, 1966, and 1967.
- British musicians:
  - The Beatles (13 April – 31 May, 1‍–‍14 November, and 18‍–‍31 December 1962)
  - Cliff Bennett and the Rebel Rousers
  - The Big Three
  - Black Sabbath
  - Chicken Shack, featuring Christine McVie
  - Cream
  - Lee Curtis and the All-Stars
  - Dave Dee, Dozy, Beaky, Mick & Tich
  - Earth (pre-Black Sabbath)
  - Gun
  - The Jimi Hendrix Experience (US/UK, March 1967)
  - The Nice
  - The Jaybirds, featuring Alvin Lee
  - Innocent Child, Blackpool Rock Band (originally Cherry Blossom Clinic)
  - Billy J. Kramer
  - The Dakotas
  - The Liverbirds
  - Maze featuring Ian Paice and Rod Evans later of Deep Purple
  - The Overlanders
  - The Pretty Things
  - The Remo Four
  - The Searchers
  - Taste
  - Kingsize Taylor and the Dominoes
  - Richard Thompson
  - Soft Machine
  - The Twilights
  - The V.I.P.'s
  - The Roadrunners, Liverpool's original R & B band of the '60s
  - Ian Hunter
- German musicians:
  - The Rattles and many more
- Italian musicians
  - Benjamin & His Brothers (band featuring Mino Reitano)
- Swedish musicians:
  - Jerry Williams
- Yugoslav musicians:
  - Mladi

== Star-Club Records ==
In October 1962, Siegfried Loch, label manager for Philips Records, visited the Star-Club for a concert with Fats Domino. Loch persuaded Manfred Weissleder, the manager of Star-Club, to give him permission to set up recording equipment in the club. He started a record label, Star-Club Records, subsidiary of Philips Records.
