= Horst Fascher =

German music manager (1936–2026)

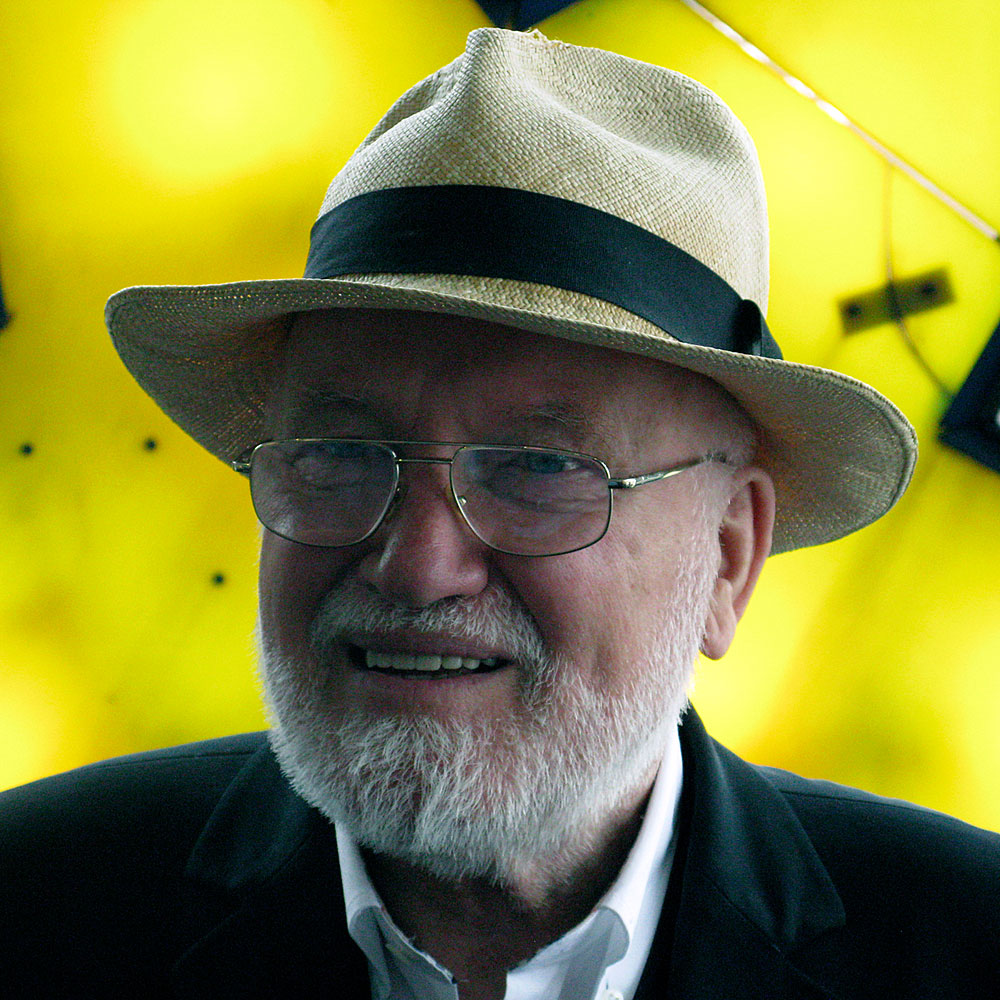
- Fascher in 2012

Background information
- Born: 5 February 1936; Hamburg, Germany
- Died: 31 October 2026 (aged 90)
- Occupations: Manager, producer

Horst Fascher (5 February 1936 – 31 October 2026) was a German music business figure who was a friend and business associate of the Beatles during their early career playing in Hamburg, Germany.

== Life and career ==
=== Early life ===
Horst Fascher was born in Hamburg, Germany, on 5 February 1936. His mother was a cleaning lady and his father was a seaman who fought in World War II, subsequently being held as a prisoner of war by the Soviet Union until 1951. As a young man, Fascher was a promising amateur boxer, becoming flyweight champion of West Germany. He had been expected to represent his country at the 1960 Olympics, but after accidentally killing a sailor in a street fight he served six months in prison and was given a lifetime ban from boxing. After his release, Fascher became involved in the emerging rock and roll scene around Hamburg's Reeperbahn, working as a barman and bouncer in the music clubs and managing groups.

=== The Beatles ===
When the Beatles (including original drummer Pete Best and bassist Stuart Sutcliffe) made their first trip to Germany in August 1960, Fascher befriended the young group, who played at the Indra Club and the Kaiserkeller. As they rose through the ranks of bands playing the Reeperbahn (making five trips in all over the next two-and-a-half years), Fascher usually managed to be working at the same clubs, and for the same boss, as the Beatles. They visited him at home, and he in turn kept troublemakers away from the band. The only favour Fascher asked was to be able to sing with them occasionally onstage, which was granted; Eddie Cochran's music was a common choice.

The Beatles (with Best now replaced by Ringo Starr, and Paul McCartney changing to bass when Sutcliffe departed) did not want to make their last Hamburg visit, at the end of 1962, preferring to stay in England to promote their new single, "Love Me Do", but were persuaded by manager Brian Epstein, via Fascher, who recalled later "I had to give him thirty marks under the table to make him do it." Nonetheless, the band had a holiday residency at the Star-Club (which Fascher co-ran), through the New Year.

Fascher guested with the Beatles during their New Year's Eve show, which was recorded by another Liverpool musician, Ted "Kingsize" Taylor. Years later (in 1977), the tape was released commercially as Live! at the Star-Club in Hamburg, Germany; 1962. A song from the album, "Hallelujah, I Love Her So", features Fascher's vocals. Another song, "Be-Bop-A-Lula", features his brother Fred's vocals.

He remained a friend and admirer of the band years after they became famous. Some of his stories about the band's Hamburg days (and his impressions of the young Beatles) have found their way into music biographies, including Philip Norman's Shout!. His own memoir "Let The Good Times Roll! Der Star-Club-Gründer erzählt" ("Told By The Star-Club Founder") was published in 2006.

=== Death ===
Horst Fascher died on 31 October 2026, at the age of 90.
