= Bruno Koschmider =

German entrepreneur (1926 – 2000)

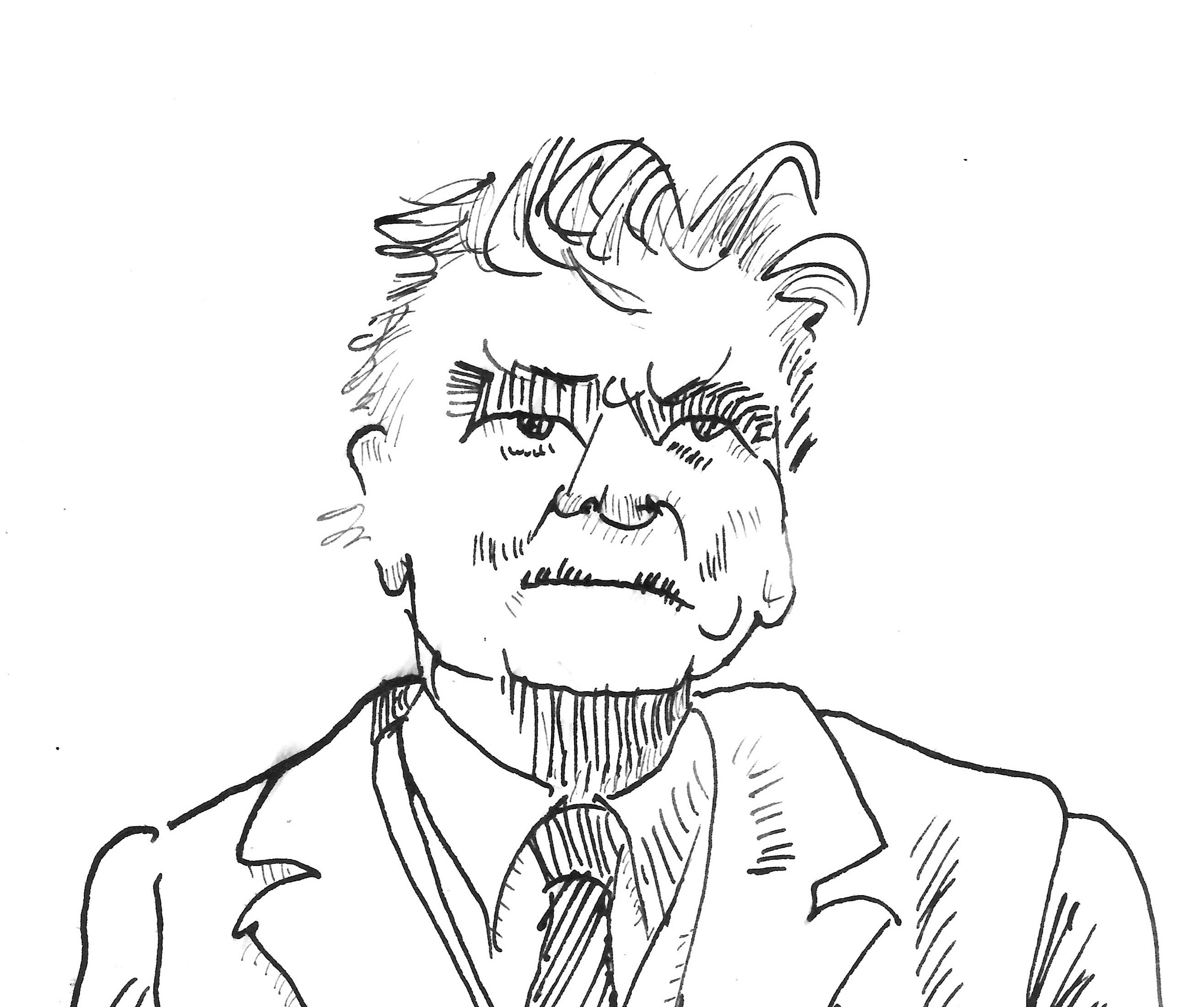
- Born: 1926; Free City of Danzig
- Died: 2000 (aged 73–74); Hamburg, Germany
- Occupation: Entrepreneur

Bruno Koschmider (1926 – 2000) was a German entrepreneur in Hamburg, best known for employing the Beatles in the early 1960s. He controlled various businesses, such as the Bambi Kino, which was a cinema, the Indra club and the Kaiserkeller.

== Personal life ==
Koschmider was born in 1926 in Free City of Danzig (Gdańsk) and died in 2000 in Hamburg, Germany.

== The Beatles ==
Allan Williams booked the Beatles (in May 1960) into Koschmider's Indra club.

The Beatles first played at the Indra club, while living in small, dirty rooms behind the movie screen in the Bambi Kino cinema. After the closure of the Indra, they played at the larger Kaiserkeller, also owned by Koschmider. In October 1960, they left the Kaiserkeller to work at the "Top Ten Club", which was run by Peter Eckhorn. When Paul McCartney and Pete Best went back to the Bambi Kino to get their belongings they found it in total darkness. Attaching a condom to a nail on the wall of their room and setting fire to it gave McCartney and Best a source of light, which they used to pack their belongings. There was no real damage, but Koschmider reported them for attempted arson. McCartney and Best spent three hours in a local jail and were deported, as was George Harrison, for working under the legal age limit.

== Legacy ==
Koschmider has been portrayed in films about the early career of the Beatles. He was played by Richard Marner in the 1979 film Birth of the Beatles, by Paul Humpoletz in the 1994 film Backbeat, and by Alex Cox in the 2000 TV film In His Life: The John Lennon Story.

== Sources ==
- Lennon, Cynthia (2006). John. Hodder & Stoughton. ISBN 0-340-89828-3.
- Miles, Barry (1998). Many Years From Now. Vintage-Random House. ISBN 0-7493-8658-4.
