= Kaiserkeller =

Music club in Hamburg, Germany

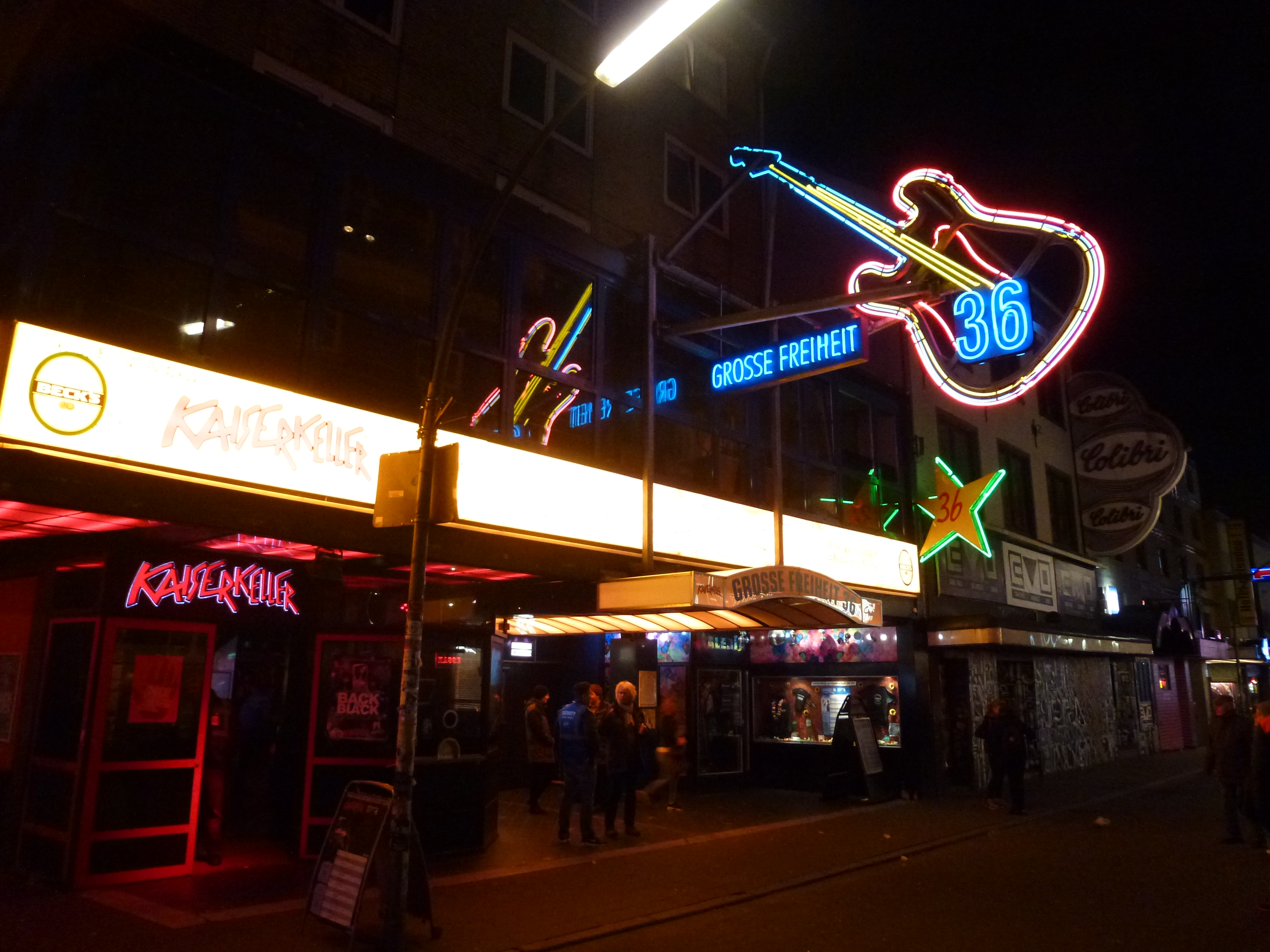
- The Kaiserkeller in 2016
- Interactive map of Kaiserkeller
- Address: Große Freiheit 36, St. Pauli, 22767 Hamburg
- Coordinates: 53°33′04.3″N 9°57′29.0″E
- Owner: Bruno Koschmider
- Capacity: c. 550
- Type: Night club
- Event: Rock
- Public transit: Reeperbahn

Construction
- Opened: 14 October 1959

Website
- docksfreiheit36.de

Kaiserkeller is a music club in the St. Pauli quarter of Hamburg, Germany, near the Reeperbahn. It was opened by Bruno Koschmider on 14 October 1959. The Beatles had a contract with Kaiserkeller to play there in 1960.

== History ==
A Caribbean steel band that had played at Allan Williams' The Jacaranda club in Liverpool took an offer to play in Hamburg. After receiving letters enthusing about Hamburg's club scene, Williams made contact with Koschmider, offering to act as a booking agent, to which Koschmider agreed. Koschmider had previously booked Derry and the Seniors after seeing them perform in London, and as they were successful in Hamburg, he asked Williams to look for additional groups. Rory Storm and The Hurricanes were Williams' first choice, but as they were committed to a season at a Butlins holiday camp, they turned his offer down, as did Gerry & The Pacemakers, so Williams sent The Beatles to Hamburg instead. They were required to play six or seven hours a night, seven nights a week. The Beatles first played at Koschmider's Indra club, sleeping in small, "dirty" rooms in the Bambi Kino, and then moved (after the closure of the Indra) to the larger Kaiserkeller.

After the summer season ended in early October 1960, Rory Storm and The Hurricanes were free to travel to Hamburg, replacing Derry and The Seniors at the Kaiserkeller. They arrived in Hamburg on 1 October 1960, having negotiated to be paid more than The Seniors or the Beatles. They played five or six 90-minute sets every day, alternating with the Beatles. Rory Storm and The Hurricanes were later presented with a special certificate by Koschmider for their performances.

The St. Pauli quarter was well known as being an area where prostitutes were to be found, and was dangerous for anyone that looked different from the usual clientele. The stage of the Kaiserkeller was made of planks of wood balanced on the top of beer crates, so the two groups made a bet to see to who would be the first to break it. After punishing the stage for days, a slight crack appeared, and when Storm jumped off the top of the upright piano, it finally broke. Storm's guitarist, Johnny 'Guitar' Byrne, remembered that as Storm hit the stage, it cracked loudly and formed a V-shape around Storm. He disappeared into it, and all the amplifiers and drummer Ringo Starr's cymbals slid into the hole. Koschmider was furious, and had to replace the live music with a juke box. Both groups went across the road to Harold's cafe for breakfast, but were followed by Koschmider's doormen with coshes, who beat the musicians as punishment. Horst Fascher was Koschmider's nightclub bouncer, whose career as a boxer had been cut short (he had unintentionally killed a sailor in a street fight) although he later became a friend of the Beatles, and protected them.

Klaus Voormann once watched performances by The Hurricanes and the Beatles at the club, and invited photographer Astrid Kirchherr and friend Jürgen Vollmer to watch the performances the next day. The Beatles' bass player, Stuart Sutcliffe, met Kirchherr between sets, and began dating Kirchherr shortly thereafter. Voormann was in a relationship with Kirchherr at the time, although after other visits to the Kaiserkeller their relationship became purely platonic, although she always remained close friends with Voormann.

In October 1960, the Beatles left Koschmider's club and worked at the Top Ten Club, which was run by Peter Eckhorn.

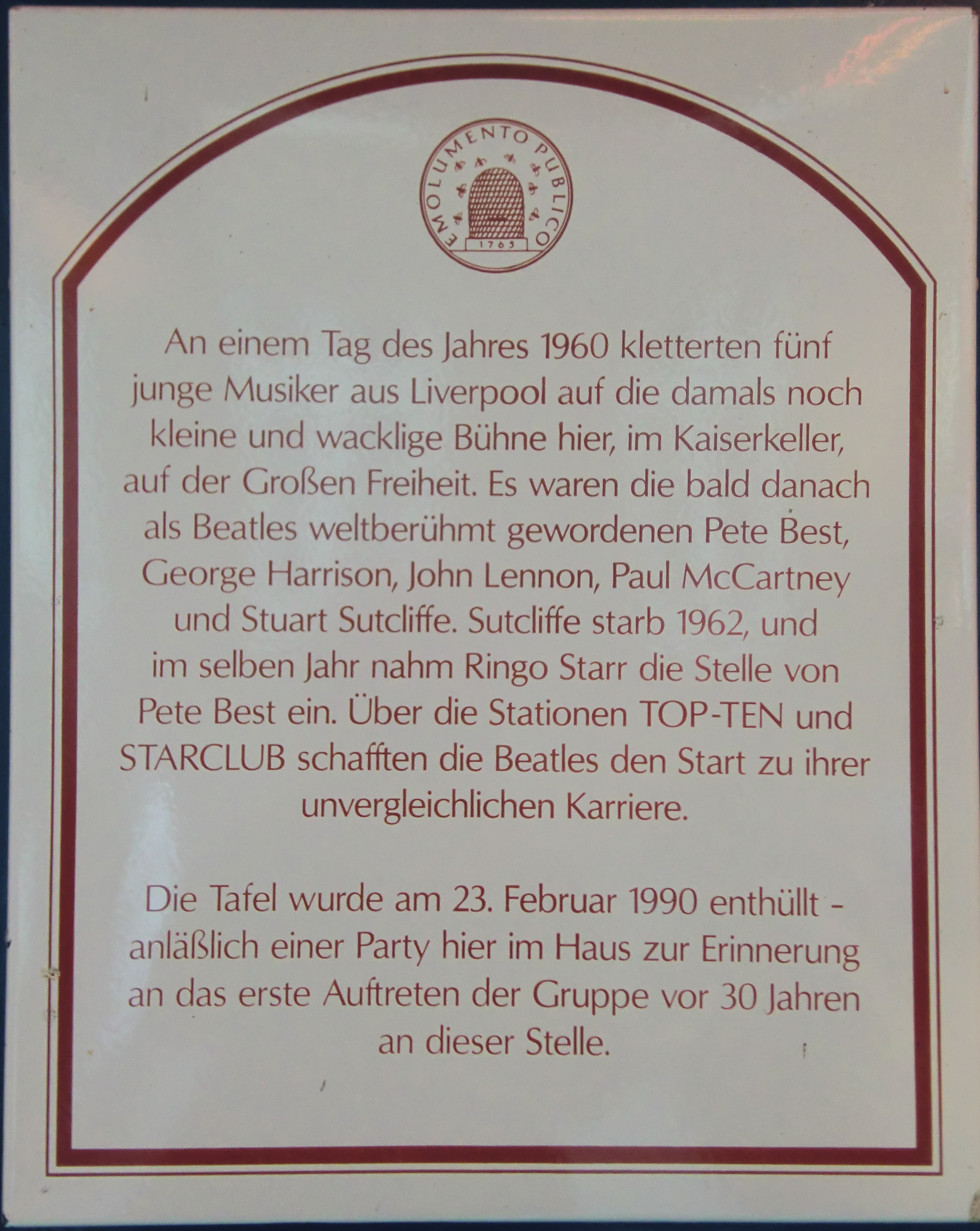
A plaque detailing the history of the Kaiserkeller

== Later years ==
Today the Kaiserkeller is an alternative Rock Club that belongs to the "Große Freiheit 36".
