= Lea Drinda =

German actress (born 2000 or 2001)

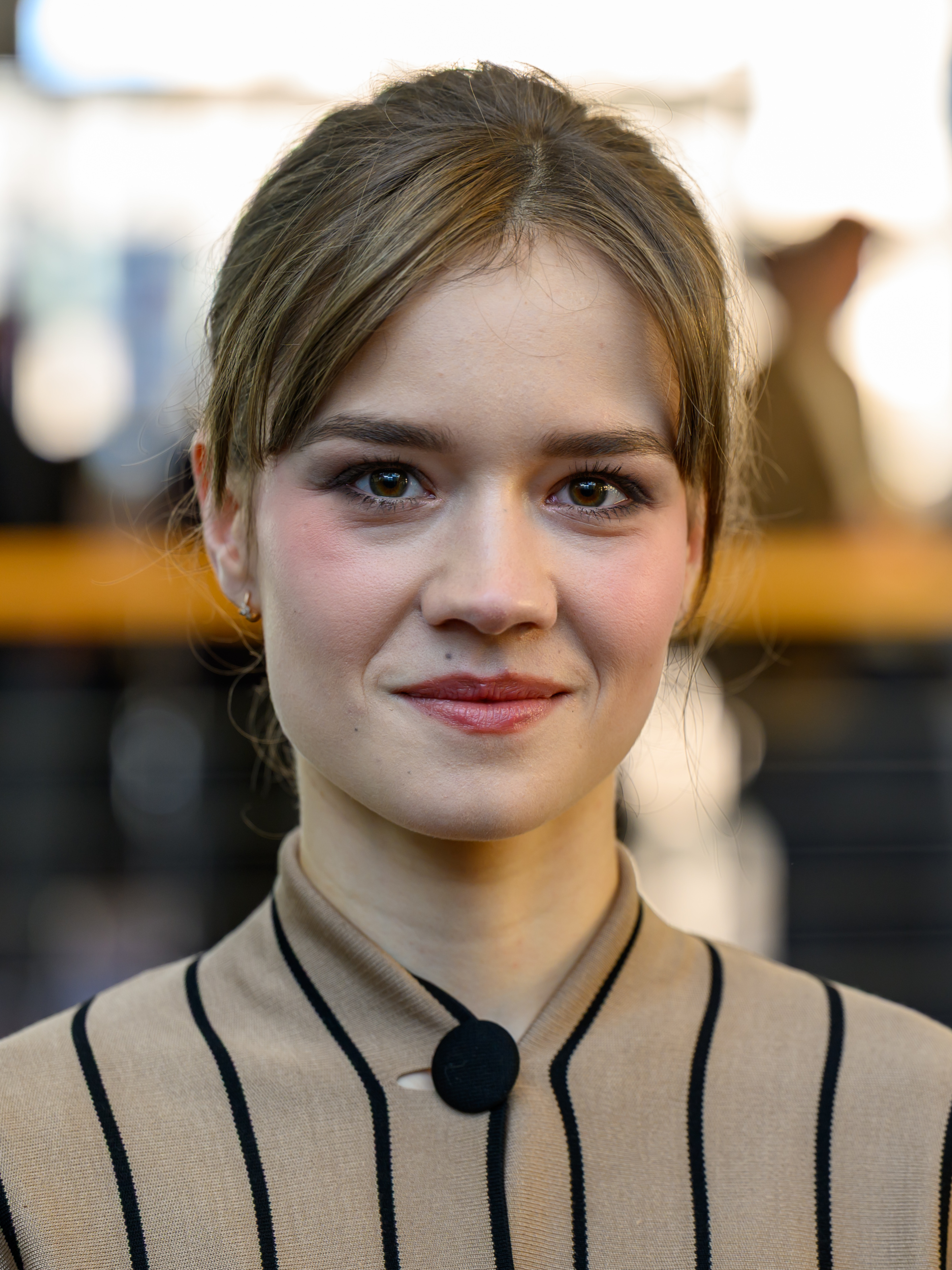
- Drinda at the 2026 Berlin International Film Festival
- Born: 2000 or 2001 (age 25–26); Jena, Thuringia, Germany
- Occupation: Actress
- Years active: 2019–present
- Relatives: Horst Drinda (grandfather)

Lea Drinda (born 2000 or 2001) is a German actress.

== Biography ==
Drinda was born and raised in Jena. Her parents are both doctors. Her grandfather, Horst Drinda, was also an actor. She has both German and Spanish citizenship. She originally wanted to study philosophy, psychology, and sociology before pursuing acting.

In January 2025, she was selected for the German Films Face To Face Campaign.

In June 2026, it was reported that Drinda had been cast as Astrid Kirchherr in the BBC TV drama series Hamburg Days, replacing Luna Jordan who had died suddenly and unexpectedly the month before during filming.

== Filmography ==
=== Film ===
Year	Title	Role	Ref.
2022	Everybody Wants to Be Loved	Elli	
2025	Callas, Darling	Siri	
2025	Sound of Falling	Erika	
2025	Danke für nichts	Katharina	

=== Television ===
Year	Title	Role	Notes	Ref.
2019	Letzte Spur Berlin	Micky Wositzke	3 episodes	
2019	Die Pfefferkörner	Aylen	1 episode	
2021	We Children from Bahnhof Zoo	Babsi	8 episodes	
2021	Check Check	Receptionist	1 episode	
2021	Theresa Wolff – Home Sweet Home	Paula Weisshaupt	Television film	
2022	Stralsund	Daria	1 episode	
2022	Becoming Charlie	Charlie	6 episodes	
2022	Das Märchen vom Frosch und der goldenen Kugel	Fee Fingerhut	Television film	
2023	The Gryphon	Becky	6 episodes	
2023	Wer wir sind	Luise Kogan	6 episodes	
2024	Night in Paradise	Anna	6 episodes	
2024	Where's Wanda?	Wanda Klatt	8 episodes	
2026	Hamburg Days	Astrid Kirchherr	6 episodes	

=== Music videos ===
Year	Title	Artist	Ref.
2021	"Summer in Berlin"	Schiller	

== Awards and nominations ==
Award	Year	Category	Nominated work	Result	Ref.
Cinema Jove	2023	Best Performance in a Series	Becoming Charlie	Won	
Deutscher Fernsehpreis	2022	Best Actress	Becoming Charlie	Nominated	
Grimme-Preis	2023	Outstanding Individual Achievement	Becoming Charlie	Nominated	
Hessischer Film- und Kinopreis	2022	Hessischer Fernsehpreis	Becoming Charlie	Nominated	
New Faces Award	2022	Best Young Actress	Becoming Charlie	Won	
