= Hamburg Days =

Upcoming British television series

- Created by: Christian Schwochow
- Based on: It Started in Hamburg by Klaus Voormann
- Screenplay by: Benjamin Benedict; Jamie Carragher
- Directed by: Mat Whitecross
- Starring: Ellis Murphy; Patrick Gilmore; Harvey Brett; Rhys Mannion; Louis Landau; Lea Drinda; Casper von Bülow; Lasse Klene
- Music by: David Holmes
- Countries of origin: United Kingdom; Germany
- Original language: English
- No. of series: 1

Production
- Executive producers: Benjamin Benedict; Quirin Berg; Max Wiedemann; Andrew Eaton; Justin Thomson; Stuart Ford; Lourdes Diaz; Miguel A. Palos Jnr
- Production companies: AGC Television; W&B Television; Turbine Studios

Original release
- Network: BBC One; ZDF

Hamburg Days is an upcoming six-part British-German television drama series about the Beatles‘ early career in Hamburg in 1960s, set to broadcast on BBC One. It is based on the 2018 autobiography It Started in Hamburg by artist and session musician Klaus Voormann, who also consulted on the series. It is being developed by producer Benjamin Benedict with head writer Jamie Carragher.

== Premise ==
Young German artists in the St Pauli district of Hamburg in the 1960s meet a young British rock and roll band from Liverpool.

== Cast ==
- Ellis Murphy as Paul McCartney
- Patrick Gilmore as Pete Best
- Harvey Brett as George Harrison
- Rhys Mannion as John Lennon
- Louis Landau as Stuart Sutcliffe
- Lea Drinda as Astrid Kirchherr
- Casper von Bülow as Klaus Voormann
- Lasse Klene as Jürgen Vollmer
- Christine Tremarco as Mimi Smith
- Jonny Lee Miller as Jim McCartney
- Asa Butterfield as Brian Epstein
- Louis McCartney as Ringo Starr
- David Dawson as Bob Wooler
- Ryan Sampson as Allan Williams
- Darci Shaw as Cynthia Lennon
- Archie George as Tony Sheridan
- Jorden Myrie as Lord Woodbine
- Tash Major as Dorothy Rhone

== Production ==
=== Development ===
The six-part series was announced by BBC One in December 2025. The series was developed by Benjamin Benedict and written by Jamie Carragher with Christian Schwochow as showrunner. It is directed Mat Whitecross. The series is set in Hamburg in the 1960s and based on the autobiography of Voormann who is a consultant in the series. Funding also came from AGC Television and German broadcaster ZDF and was produced by W&B Television and Turbine Studios. Benedict, Quirin Berg, and Max Wiedemann for W&B Television, as well as Andrew Eaton and Justin Thomson for Turbine Studios with Stuart Ford, Lourdes Diaz, and Miguel A. Palos Jr are executive producers.

=== Casting ===
The main cast was announced in May 2026 with Ellis Murphy, Harvey Brett and Rhys Mannion as McCartney, Harrison and Lennon with Paddy Gilmore as Pete Best and Louis Landau as Stuart Sutcliffe, with Luna Jordan, Casper von Bülow and Lasse Klene as Astrid Kirchherr, Klaus Voormann and Jürgen Vollmer. Murphy is a right-handed guitarist who has to learn to play left-handed to portray McCartney. Landau is left-handed and had to learn to play his instrument right-handed. The wider cast includes Christine Tremarco, Jonny Lee Miller and Asa Butterfield.

Filming commenced in 2026 with filming locations including Hamburg and Munich in Germany, and Liverpool in England.

However, the sudden death of Jordan on 13 May 2026 saw the role of Kirchherr recast, with Lea Drinda taking on the part.

=== Music ===
The music is curated on the series by David Holmes. The series contains cover version of songs from artists including Consuelo Velázquez, Bobby Scott and Ric Marlow with songs recorded for the series in the basement of the Casbah Coffee Club by the Liverpool band Savage Young Beatles.

== See also ==
- Outline of the Beatles
- The Beatles in popular culture
- The Beatles – A Four-Film Cinematic Event
