= Horst Drinda =

German actor (1927–2005)

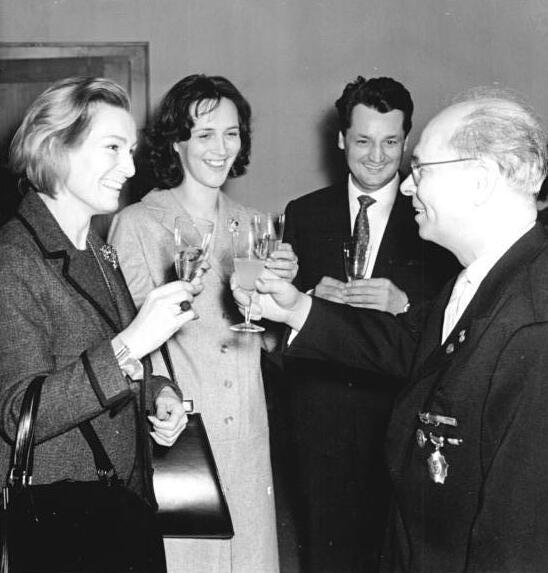
- Drinda (second from right) with (left to right) Inge Keller, Irma Münch, and Alexander Abusch in 1962.
- Born: 1 May 1927; Berlin, Germany
- Died: 21 February 2005 (aged 77); Berlin, Germany
- Occupation: Actor
- Years active: 1948-2003
- Relatives: Lea Drinda (granddaughter)

Horst Drinda (1 May 1927 – 21 February 2005) was a German actor. He appeared in more than ninety films from 1948 to 2003.

== Partial filmography ==
Year	Title	Role	Notes
1956	Das tapfere Schneiderlein		
1957	Lissy		
1959	Before the Lightning Strikes		
1961	The Dress		
1962	Das verhexte Fischerdorf	Mauritius Halbermann, gen. 'Mauts'	
1963	Das Stacheltier - Der Dieb von San Marengo	Cesare Giovanini	
1965	Die besten Jahre	Ernst Machner	
1966	Die Reise nach Sundevit	Abschnittsbevollmächtigter	
1968	Der Mord, der nie verjährt	Pabst	
1971	KLK Calling PTZ – The Red Orchestra	Dr. jur. Dr. phil. Arvid Harnack	
1979	Addio, piccola mia	Dr. Ernst Büchner	
1979	Nachtspiele	Herr Paul	
1981	Dve strochki melkim shriftom		
1982	Berühmte Ärzte der Charité: Arzt in Uniform		
1996	Jailbirds	Old Man	
