= Das tapfere Schneiderlein =

1956 film

- Directed by: Helmut Spieß
- Written by: Kurt Bortfeldt; Brothers Grimm
- Starring: Kurt Schmidtchen
- Cinematography: Robert Baberske
- Music by: Joachim Werzlau
- Release date: 1956
- Running time: 83 minutes
- Country: East Germany
- Language: German

Das tapfere Schneiderlein is an East German fantasy film directed by Helmut Spieß. It was released in 1956.

== Cast ==
- Kurt Schmidtchen as Das tapfere Schneiderlein
- Christel Bodenstein as Traute
- Horst Drinda as Prinz Eitel
- Fred Kronström as König Griesgram
- Gerd Michael Henneberg as Schatzmeister Gier
- Fred Wolff as Leibdiener Zimperlich
- Fred Mahr as Gärtner Sommer
- Wolf Kaiser as 1. Riese
- Gerhard Frei as 2. Riese
- Ellen Plessow as Schneidermeisterin
- Fredy Barten as Schneidermeister
- Helene Riechers as Musfrau
- Christian Balhaus as Knappe Thilo
- Waltraud Kramm as Junge Bäuerin
