= Mascha Schilinski =

German filmmaker (born 1984)

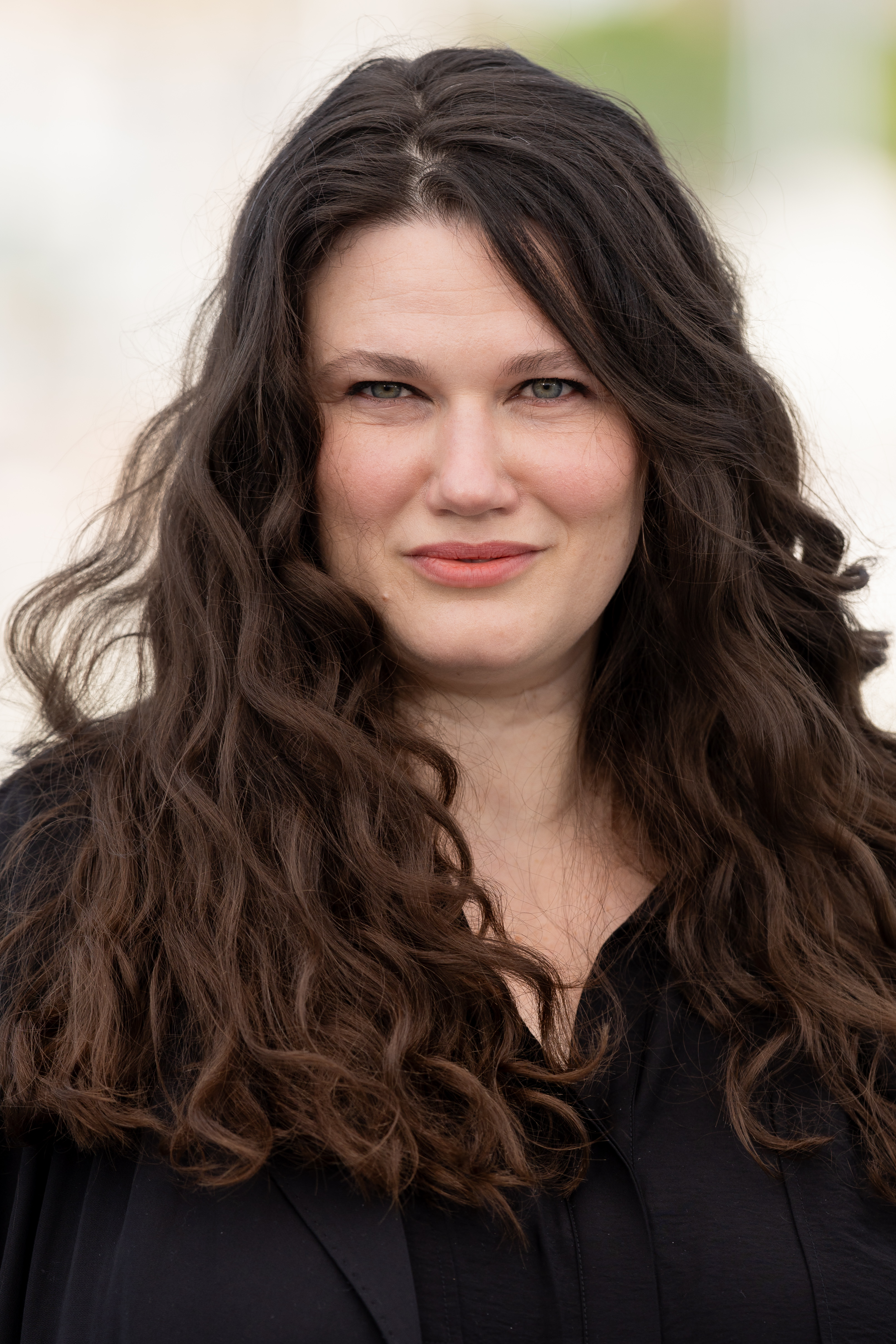
- Schilinski at the 2025 Cannes Film Festival
- Born: 1984 (age 41–42); West Berlin, West Germany
- Education: Filmschule Hamburg Berlin; Film Academy Baden-Württemberg
- Occupations: Director; screenwriter
- Years active: 2008–present
- Spouse: Fabian Gamper
- Children: 1

Mascha Schilinski (German pronunciation: [ˈmaʃa ʃiˈlɪnski]; born 1984) is a German film director and screenwriter. Her second feature film, Sound of Falling (2025), won the Jury Prize at the 78th Cannes Film Festival.

== Early life ==
Schilinski was born in West Berlin to a German filmmaker mother and a French construction worker father. She was a child actor in her youth. After dropping out of high school, she worked as a magician in a traveling circus. She graduated from the screenwriting program at the Filmschule Hamburg Berlin in 2008, and later studied directing at the Film Academy Baden-Württemberg.

== Career ==
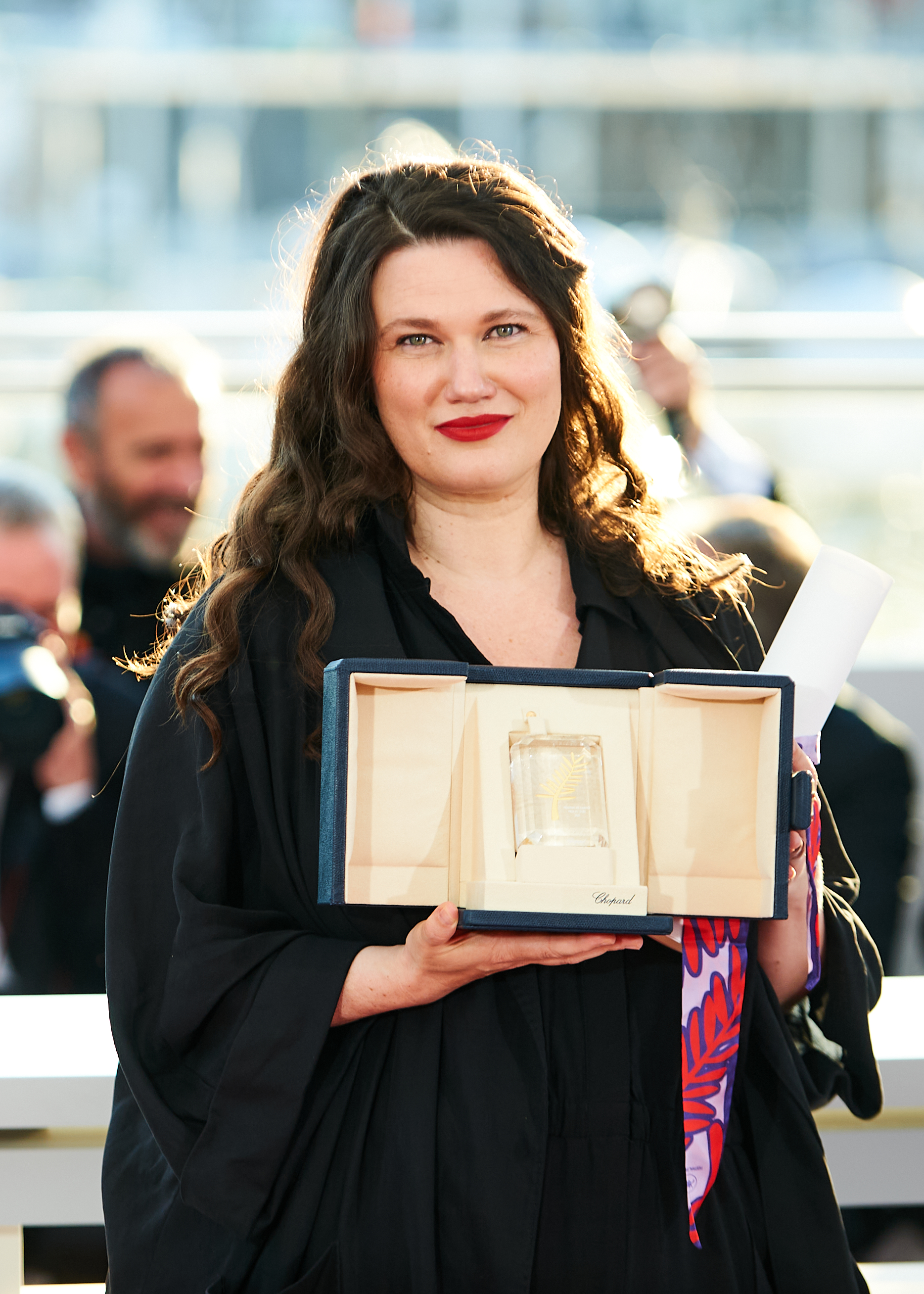
Schilinski holding the Jury Prize at the 2025 Cannes Film Festival

Schilinski began her career as a casting director and freelance writer. Her first feature film, Dark Blue Girl, premiered at the 2017 Berlin International Film Festival and was nominated for the GWFF Best First Feature Award.

Her second feature film, Sound of Falling, was screened in competition at the 2025 Cannes Film Festival, where it won the Jury Prize; the film marked only the second time a German production won the Cannes Jury Prize, after Konrad Wolf's Stars in 1959. The film was later selected as the German entry for Best International Feature Film at the 98th Academy Awards, though it was not nominated.

Schilinski signed with Creative Artists Agency and Ithaka Media in December 2025.

== Personal life ==
Schilinski's husband, Fabian Gamper, is a cinematographer. They have one child.

== Filmography ==
=== Film ===
Year	Title	Director	Writer	Notes	Ref.
2012	Wir müssen los!	Yes	No	Short film; co-directed with Roman Schikorsky	
2014	Das Gefühl	Yes	Yes	Short film	
2015	Die Katze	Yes	Yes	Short film	
2017	Dark Blue Girl	Yes	Yes		
2025	Sound of Falling	Yes	Yes	Co-written with Louise Peter	

=== Television ===
Year	Title	Director	Writer	Notes	Ref.
2019–2020	Cologne P.D.	Yes	No	2 episodes	

== Awards and nominations ==
Award	Year	Category	Nominated work	Result	Ref.
Berlin International Film Festival	2017	GWFF Best First Feature Award	Dark Blue Girl	Nominated	
Cannes Film Festival	2025	Palme d'Or	Sound of Falling	Nominated	
Cannes Film Festival	2025	Jury Prize	Sound of Falling	Won	
European Film Awards	2026	Best Film	Sound of Falling	Nominated	
European Film Awards	2026	Best Director	Sound of Falling	Nominated	
European Film Awards	2026	Best Screenwriter	Sound of Falling	Nominated	
German Film Awards	2026	Best Direction	Sound of Falling	Won	
German Film Awards	2026	Best Screenplay	Sound of Falling	Won	
Jerusalem Film Festival	2025	Best Director	Sound of Falling	Special mention	
LA Film Festival	2017	World Fiction Award	Dark Blue Girl	Nominated	
Melbourne International Film Festival	2025	Bright Horizons Competition	Sound of Falling	Nominated	
Red Rock Film Festival	2017	Best Fiction Feature	Dark Blue Girl	Won	
