= Stuart Sutcliffe =

British painter and musician (1940–1962)

- Sutcliffe in 1961
- Born: Stuart Fergusson Victor Sutcliffe; 23 June 1940; Edinburgh, Scotland
- Died: 10 April 1962 (aged 21); Hamburg, West Germany
- Occupations: Painter; musician
- Years active: 1957–1961 (musician)
- Partner: Astrid Kirchherr (eng. 1960)
- Musical career
- Origin: Liverpool, England
- Genre: Rock and roll
- Instruments: Bass; vocals
- Formerly of: The Quarrymen; The Beatles

Stuart Fergusson Victor Sutcliffe (23 June 1940 – 10 April 1962) was a British painter and musician, best known as the original bass guitarist of the Beatles. Sutcliffe, who helped John Lennon invent the band's name, is among the people sometimes referred to as the "Fifth Beatle".

When Sutcliffe performed with the Beatles in Hamburg, he met photographer Astrid Kirchherr, to whom he was later engaged to marry. He left the band to pursue his career as a painter, having attended Liverpool College of Art, and enrolled in the Hamburg College of Art, studying under future pop artist Eduardo Paolozzi, who later wrote that Sutcliffe was one of his best students. Sutcliffe earned other praise for his paintings, which mostly explored a style related to abstract expressionism.

While studying in West Germany, Sutcliffe began suffering from intense headaches and experiencing acute light sensitivity. In February 1962, he collapsed in the middle of an art class after complaining of head pains. German doctors performed tests, but were unable to determine a cause. After collapsing again on 10 April 1962, Sutcliffe was taken to a hospital, but died in the ambulance on the way. The cause of death was later found to have been a brain haemorrhage in the right ventricle of his brain.

== Early years ==
Stuart Fergusson Victor Sutcliffe was the eldest child of Charles and Martha (known as "Millie") Sutcliffe. Charles – "a public school boy, army officer, prominent member of the Tory party and leading fellow of the masons" – had moved to Liverpool in 1943 to help with work for the War Office, administering the Cammell Laird shipyards munitions department in Birkenhead. He subsequently signed on as a ship's engineer, so he was often at sea during his son's early years. Millie was a teacher at an infants' school and "an active supporter of the Labour party". Sutcliffe's father was Protestant and his mother Catholic; their families disowned them and they "probably did not marry". Sutcliffe had two younger sisters, Pauline and Joyce; three older half-brothers, Joe, Ian, and Charles; and an older half-sister, Mattie, from his father's first marriage to a woman also named Martha.

Sutcliffe was born on 23 June 1940 at the Edinburgh Royal Maternity Hospital and Simpson Memorial Maternity Pavilion in Edinburgh. After his family moved to England, he was brought up at 37 Aigburth Drive in Liverpool. He attended Park View Primary School, Huyton (1946–1951), and Prescot Grammar School from 4 September 1951 to 1956. When Sutcliffe's father returned home on leave, he invited his son and art college classmate Rod Murray (also Sutcliffe's housemate and best friend), for a "real good booze-up", slipping £10 into Sutcliffe's pocket before disappearing for another six months.

During his first year at the Liverpool College of Art, Sutcliffe worked as a bin man on the Liverpool Corporation's waste collection trucks. John Lennon was introduced to Sutcliffe by mutual friend Bill Harry when all three were students at the College of Art. According to Lennon, Sutcliffe had a "marvellous art portfolio" and was a very talented painter who was one of the "stars" of the school. He helped Lennon improve his artistic skills, and with others, worked with him when Lennon had to submit work for exams.

Sutcliffe shared a flat with Murray at 9 Percy Street, Liverpool, before being evicted. He moved to Hillary Mansions at 3 Gambier Terrace, home of art student Margaret Duxbury (the future Margaret Chapman), who vied with Sutcliffe to be the best painter in their class. The flat was opposite the Anglican cathedral in the rundown area of Liverpool 8, with bare lightbulbs and a mattress on the floor in the corner. Lennon moved in with Sutcliffe in early 1960. (Paul McCartney later admitted he was jealous of Sutcliffe's relationship with Lennon, as he had to take a "back seat" to Sutcliffe.)

Sutcliffe and his flatmates painted the rooms yellow and black, which their landlady did not appreciate.

After talking to Sutcliffe one night at the Casbah Coffee Club (owned by Pete Best's mother, Mona Best), Lennon and McCartney persuaded him to buy a Höfner 500/5 model bass guitar on hire-purchase from Frank Hessey's Music Shop. Sutcliffe's prior music experience consisted of piano lessons, which his mother had insisted on since he was nine; singing in the Huyton church choir, playing bugle in the Air Training Corps, and playing guitar using chords his father had taught him.

Lennon and Sutcliffe are credited with naming the Beatles. They both liked Buddy Holly's band, the Crickets, and shared a fascination with group names with double meanings ("crickets", for example, refers to an insect and a sport). Lennon came up with "the Beatles", from the word beat (though his original spelling was "Beatals").

In May 1960, Sutcliffe joined Lennon, McCartney, and George Harrison (then known as "the Silver Beatles"). Although he had previously played acoustic guitar, Sutcliffe's fingers would often blister during long rehearsals, as he had never practised long enough for his fingers to become calloused. He started acting as a booking agent for the group, and they often used his Gambier Terrace flat as a rehearsal room.

In July 1960, the Sunday newspaper The People ran an article titled "The Beatnik Horror" with a photograph taken in the flat below Sutcliffe's of a teenaged Lennon lying on the floor, with Sutcliffe standing by a window. As they had often visited the Jacaranda Club, its owner, Allan Williams, had arranged for the photo to be taken, subsequently taking over from Sutcliffe to book concerts for the group: Lennon, McCartney, Harrison and Sutcliffe. The Beatles' subsequent name change came during an afternoon in the Renshaw Hall bar when Sutcliffe, Lennon, and Lennon's girlfriend Cynthia Powell thought up names similar to Holly's band, the Crickets, and came up with "Beetles".

== The Beatles and Hamburg ==
Sutcliffe's playing style was elementary, mostly sticking to the root notes of the chords played by Lennon, McCartney and Harrison, as opposed to the more technically demanding walking basslines commonplace in early rock 'n' roll. Bill Harry—an art school friend, and founder and editor of the Mersey Beat newspaper—complained to Sutcliffe that he should be concentrating on art and not music, as he thought that Sutcliffe was merely a competent musician whose talents would be better used in the visual arts. While Sutcliffe is often described in Beatles biographies as appearing uncomfortable onstage and occasionally playing with his back to the audience, Pete Best, their drummer at the time, denies this. Best recalled Sutcliffe was usually good-natured and "animated" before an audience. Allan Williams later claimed that, when the Beatles auditioned for Larry Parnes at the Wyvern Club in Liverpool, Parnes would have hired the group as the backing band for Billy Fury for £10 per week (equivalent to £200 in 2025), but that as Sutcliffe turned his back to Parnes throughout the audition (because, as Williams believed, Sutcliffe could not play very well), Parnes said he would hire them only if they got rid of Sutcliffe. Parnes later denied this, stating his only concern was that the group had no permanent drummer. Klaus Voormann regarded Sutcliffe as a good bass player, although Beatles historian Richie Unterberger described Sutcliffe's bass playing as an "artless thump".

In August the group moved to Hamburg, where Williams had booked them in at the Indira Club, where all five band members lived in a concrete storeroom, next to the toilets of the neighbouring cinema. When the Indira closed they moved on to the larger Kaiserkeller on 4 October, where they drew a larger crowd and more attention. Sutcliffe's profile grew after he began wearing Ray-Ban sunglasses and tight trousers. His high spot was singing "Love Me Tender", which drew more applause than the other Beatles and increased the friction with McCartney. Lennon also started to criticise Sutcliffe, joking about his size and playing. On 5 December 1960, Harrison, who was underage, was sent back to Britain. McCartney and Best were deported for attempted arson at the Bambi Kino, which left Lennon and Sutcliffe in Hamburg. Lennon also returned home, but as Sutcliffe had a cold, he stayed in Hamburg. Sutcliffe later borrowed money from his girlfriend Astrid Kirchherr so he could fly back to Liverpool on Friday 20 January 1961, although he returned to Hamburg in March with the other Beatles.

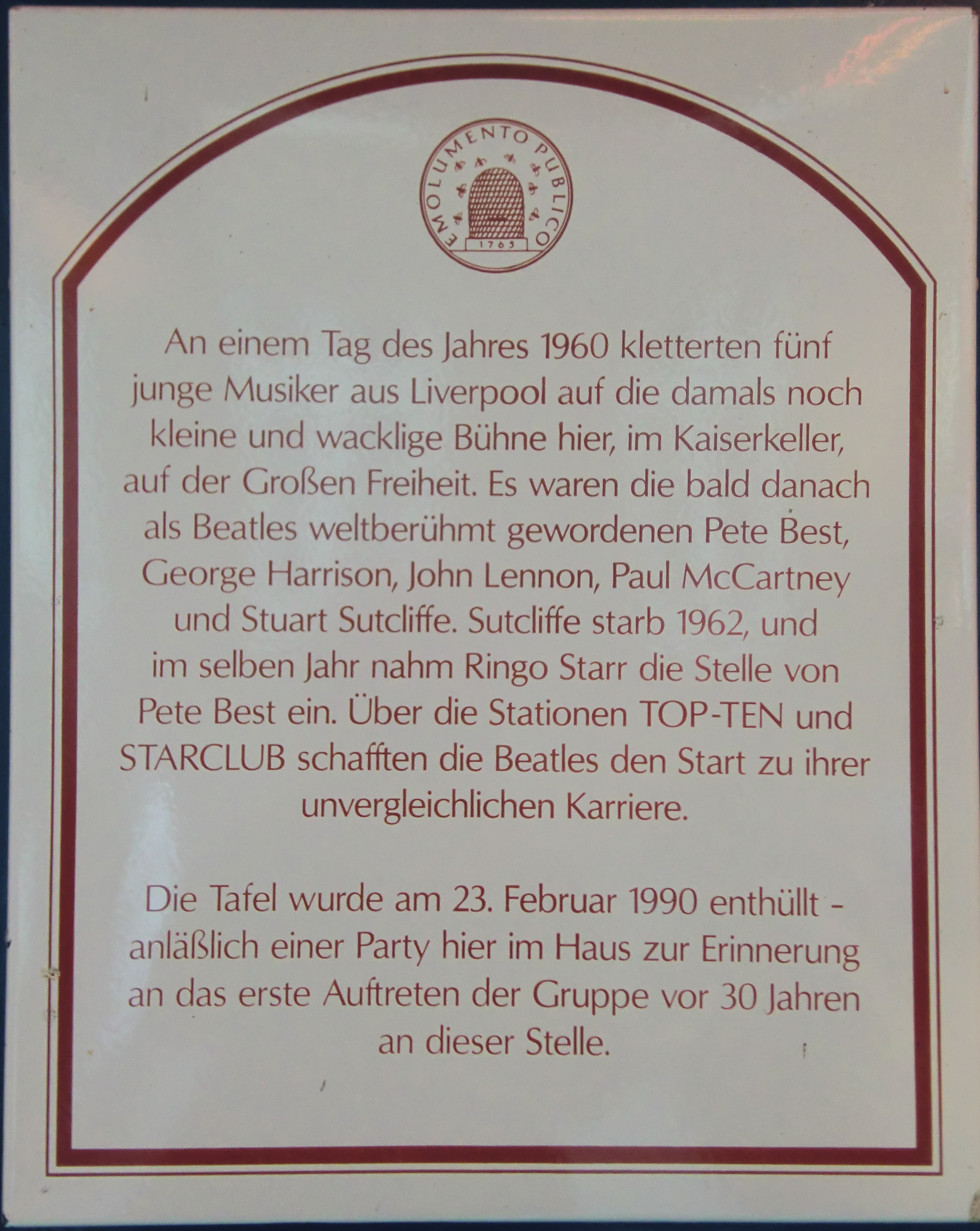
Plaque commemorating The Beatles' visit to Hamburg

In July 1961, Sutcliffe decided to leave the group to continue painting. After being awarded a postgraduate scholarship, he enrolled at Hochschule für bildende Künste Hamburg, where he studied under the tutelage of Eduardo Paolozzi. He briefly lent McCartney his bass until the latter could earn enough to buy a specially-made smaller left-handed Höfner 500/1 bass of his own in June 1961. However, Sutcliffe specifically asked McCartney (who is left-handed) not to change the strings around or restring the instrument, so McCartney was forced to play it upside down.

In 1967, a photo of Sutcliffe was included on the cover of Sgt. Pepper's Lonely Hearts Club Band (extreme left, in front of fellow artist Aubrey Beardsley).

== Astrid Kirchherr ==
Sutcliffe met Astrid Kirchherr in the Kaiserkeller, where she had gone to watch the Beatles perform. She had been brought up by her widowed mother, Nielsa Kirchherr, on Eimsbütteler Strasse, in a wealthy part of the Hamburg suburb of Altona. After a photo session with the Beatles, Kirchherr invited them to her mother's house for tea. She showed them her bedroom, which she had decorated in black including the furniture, with silver foil on the walls and a large tree branch hanging from the ceiling. Sutcliffe was smitten and began dating Kirchherr shortly afterwards.

He wrote to friends that he was infatuated with her, and asked her German friends which colours, films, books and painters she liked. Best commented that the beginning of their relationship was "like one of those fairy stories". Kirchherr and Sutcliffe got engaged in November 1960 and exchanged rings, as is the German custom. Sutcliffe later wrote to his parents that he was engaged to Kirchherr. They were shocked because they thought he would give up his career as an artist, although he told Kirchherr he would like to be an art teacher in London or Germany. After moving into the Kirchherr family's house, Sutcliffe used to borrow Astrid's clothes. He wore her leather trousers and jackets, oversized shirts and long scarves, and collarless jackets. He borrowed a corduroy suit with no lapels to wear on stage, which prompted Lennon to sarcastically ask if his mother had lent him the suit.

== Art ==
Hamburg Painting no. 2

Sutcliffe displayed artistic talent at an early age. Fellow student Helen Anderson remembered his early works as very aggressive with dark, moody colours, which was not what she expected from such a "quiet student". One of Sutcliffe's paintings was shown at the Walker Art Gallery in Liverpool as part of the John Moores exhibition, from November 1959 to January 1960. After the exhibition, Moores bought Sutcliffe's canvas for £65 (equivalent to £1,302 in 2025), which was then equal to 6–7 weeks' wages for an average working man. The picture Moores bought was titled Summer Painting, and Sutcliffe attended a formal dinner to celebrate the exhibition with another art student, Susan Williams. Murray remembered that the work was painted on a board rather than a canvas. Due to its size, it had to be cut in two and hinged. Murray noted only one of the pieces actually got to the exhibition (because they stopped at a pub to celebrate), but sold nonetheless because Moores bought it for his son.

Sutcliffe was turned down when he applied to study for an Art Teacher's Diploma (ATD) course at Liverpool Art College, but after meeting Kirchherr, he decided to leave the Beatles and attend the Hamburg College of Art. In June 1961, he did so, under the tutelage of Paolozzi, who later wrote a report commending Sutcliffe. In Paolozzi's words: "Sutcliffe is very gifted and very intelligent. In the meantime he has become one of my best students."

Sutcliffe's few surviving works reveal influence from British and European abstract artists contemporary with the Abstract Expressionist movement in the U.S. His earlier figurative work is reminiscent of the kitchen sink school, particularly of John Bratby, though Sutcliffe was producing abstract work by the end of the 1950s, including Summer Painting purchased by Moores. Sutcliffe's works bear some comparison with those of John Hoyland and Nicolas de Staël, though they are more lyrical (Sutcliffe used the stage name "Stu de Staël" when he was playing with the Beatles on a Scottish tour in spring 1960). His later works are typically untitled, constructed from heavily impastoed slabs of pigment in the manner of de Staël (about whom he learned from Surrey-born art instructor Nicky Horsfield) and overlaid with scratched or squeezed linear elements creating enclosed spaces.

Hamburg Painting No. 2 was purchased by Liverpool's Walker Art Gallery and is one of a series entitled Hamburg in which surface and colour changes produce atmospheric energy. European artists (including Paolozzi) were also influencing Sutcliffe at the time. The Walker Art Gallery has other works by Sutcliffe: Self-Portrait (in charcoal) and The Crucifixion. Lennon later hung two of Sutcliffe's paintings in his house (Kenwood) in Weybridge, and McCartney had a Paolozzi sculpture in his Cavendish Avenue home.

== Death ==
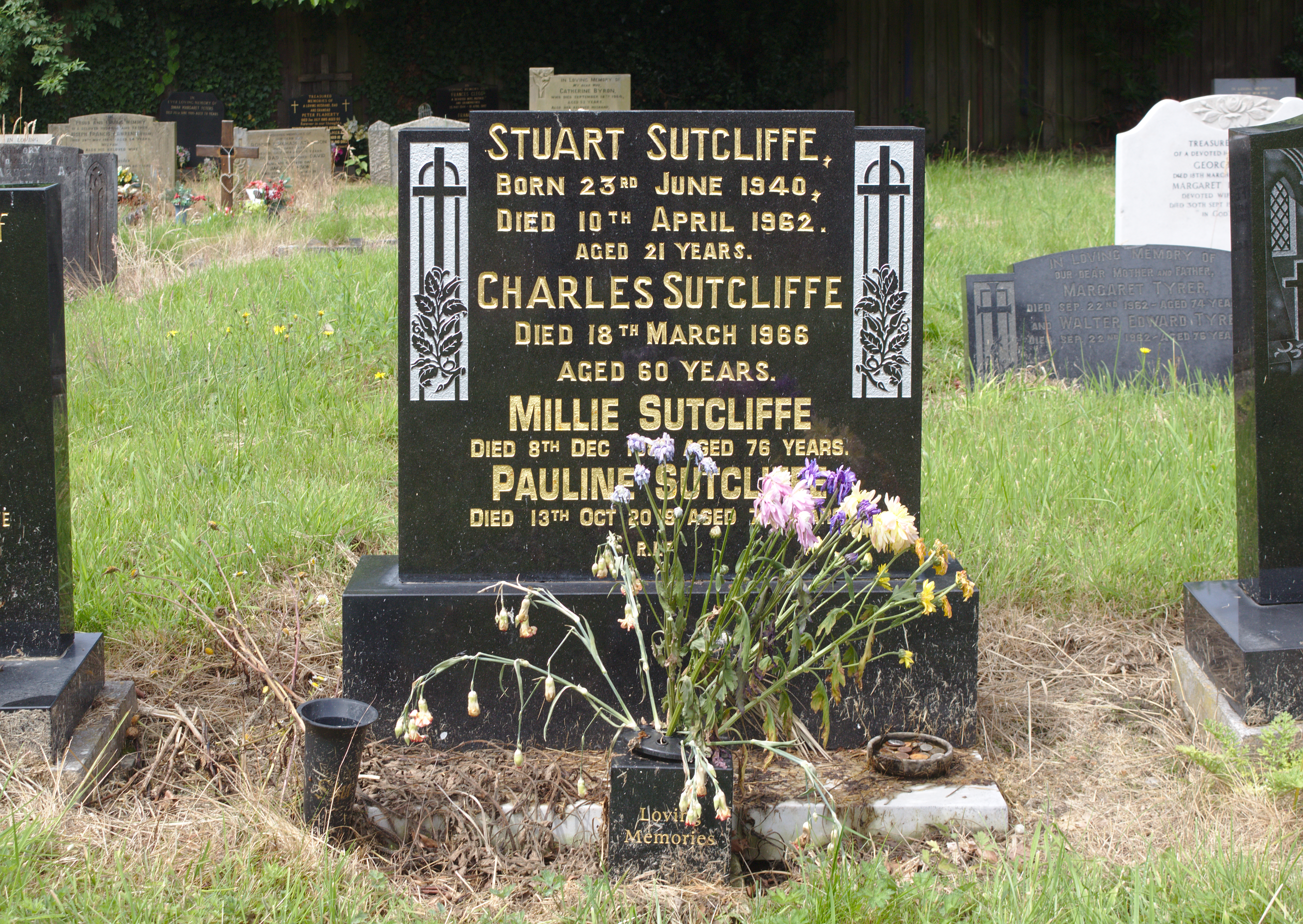
Stuart Sutcliffe's grave at St. Michael's Church

While studying in Germany, Sutcliffe began experiencing severe headaches and acute sensitivity to light. According to Kirchherr, some of the headaches left him temporarily blind. In February 1962, Sutcliffe collapsed during an art class in Hamburg. Kirchherr's mother had German doctors examine him, but they were unable to determine the exact cause of his headaches. They suggested he return to the UK and have himself admitted to a hospital with better facilities; however, after arriving, Sutcliffe was told nothing was wrong and returned to Hamburg. He continued living with the Kirchherrs, but his condition soon worsened. After he collapsed again on 10 April 1962, Kirchherr took him to hospital, riding with him in the ambulance, but he died before they arrived. The cause of death was a cerebral hemorrhage, specifically a ruptured aneurysm resulting in cerebral paralysis due to severe bleeding into the right ventricle of the brain. He was 21 years old.

On 13 April 1962, Kirchherr met the Beatles at Hamburg Airport, telling them Sutcliffe had died a few days earlier. Sutcliffe's mother flew to Hamburg with Beatles manager Brian Epstein and returned to Liverpool with her son's body. Sutcliffe's father did not hear of Stuart's death for three weeks, as he was sailing to South America on a cruise ship, although the family arranged for a padre, a military chaplain, to give him the news as soon as the ship docked in Buenos Aires. After Sutcliffe's death, Kirchherr wrote a letter to his mother, apologising for being too ill to attend his funeral in Liverpool and saying how much she and Lennon missed him:

Oh, Mum, he [Lennon] is in a terrible mood now, he just can't believe that darling Stuart never comes back. [He's] just crying his eyes out ... John is marvellous to me, he says that he knows Stuart so much and he loves him so much that he can understand me.

The cause of Sutcliffe's aneurysm is unknown, although authors of books on the Beatles have speculated it was caused by an earlier head injury. He may have been either kicked in the head, or thrown head first against a brick wall during an attack outside Lathom Hall after a performance in January 1961. According to booking agent Allan Williams, Lennon and Best went to Sutcliffe's aid, fighting off his attackers before dragging him to safety. Sutcliffe sustained a fractured skull in the fight and Lennon's little finger was broken. Sutcliffe refused medical attention at the time and failed to keep an X-ray appointment at Sefton General Hospital.

Bill Harry takes issue with these accounts, relating that "according to Stuart's mother, who Stuart revealed everything to, his headaches only began following a fall in Hamburg".

Although Lennon did not attend nor send flowers to Sutcliffe's funeral, his second wife, Yoko Ono, recalled that Lennon mentioned Sutcliffe's name often, saying he was "[My] alter ego ... a spirit in his world ... a guiding force".

Sutcliffe is buried in Huyton Parish Church Cemetery (also known as St. Michael's) in the Metropolitan Borough of Knowsley, Merseyside, in North West England.

== Posthumous music releases ==
Sutcliffe, as depicted on the album cover for Sgt. Pepper's Lonely Hearts Club Band

The Beatles' compilation album Anthology 1, released in 1995, had previously unreleased recordings from the group's early years. Sutcliffe plays bass with the Beatles on three songs they recorded in 1960: "Hallelujah I Love Her So", "You'll Be Mine", and "Cayenne". In addition, he is pictured on the front covers of all four Anthology albums as well as on the cover of Sgt. Pepper's Lonely Hearts Club Band.

In 2011, Sutcliffe's estate released a recording claimed to be Sutcliffe singing a cover of Elvis Presley's "Love Me Tender", recorded in 1961 and donated to the estate in 2009.

== Film, television, and books ==
Part One of The Beatles Anthology video documentary covers Sutcliffe's time with the group. There is no mention of his death in the documentary, but it is discussed in the accompanying book.

Sutcliffe was portrayed by David Nicholas Wilkinson in Birth of the Beatles (1979) and by Lee Williams in In His Life: The John Lennon Story (2000). Sutcliffe's role in the Beatles' early career and the factors that led him to leave the group are dramatised in the 1994 film Backbeat, in which he was portrayed by American actor Stephen Dorff. Sutcliffe does not appear in Nowhere Boy (2009), but is briefly mentioned toward the end of the film.

Upcoming depictions of Sutcliffe include the BBC/ZDF miniseries Hamburg Days, where he is played by Louis Landau, and The Beatles – A Four-Film Cinematic Event, portrayed by Harry Lawtey.

Four television documentaries have been broadcast that deal with Sutcliffe's life:

- Midnight Angel (1990) Granada TV (networked) U.K.
- Exhibition (1991) Cologne, German TV
- Stuart, His Life and Art (2005) BBC TV
- Stuart Sutcliffe, The Lost Beatle

Books about Sutcliffe:

- Backbeat: Stuart Sutcliffe: The Lost Beatle (1994) Alan Clayson and Pauline Sutcliffe
- Stuart, The Life and Art of Stuart Sutcliffe (1995) Pauline Sutcliffe and Kay Williams
- The Beatles Shadow, Stuart Sutcliffe, & His Lonely Hearts Club (2001) Pauline Sutcliffe and Douglas Thompson
- Stuart Sutcliffe: a retrospective (2008) Matthew H. Clough and Colin Fallows
- Baby's in Black (2010) Arne Bellstorf - graphic novel

The Stuart Sutcliffe Estate sells memorabilia and artifacts of Sutcliffe's, including poems written by him and the chords and lyrics to songs Lennon and Sutcliffe were learning.

== See also ==
- Outline of the Beatles
- The Beatles timeline
