= Luna Jordan =

German actress (2000–2026)

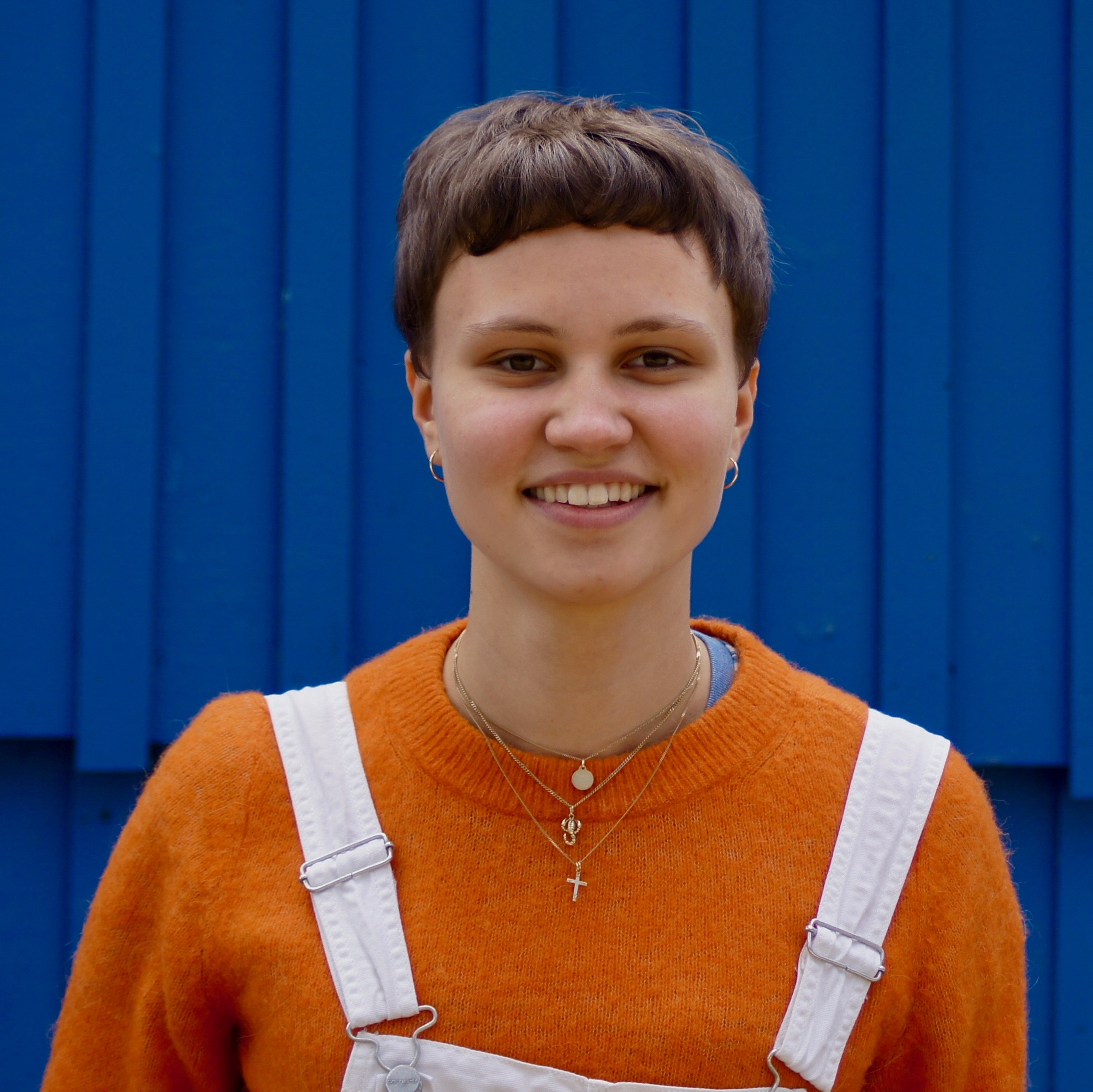
- Jordan in 2019
- Born: November 2000; Berlin, Germany
- Died: 13 May 2026 (aged 25); Berlin, Germany
- Occupations: Actress, filmmaker
- Years active: 2012–2026

Luna Jordan (November 2000 – 13 May 2026) was a German actress.

== Early life and career ==
Luna Jordan was born in Berlin in November 2000. She was the daughter of Austrian actress Bettina Ratschew and German musical performer Frank Jordan.

From a young age, she appeared in various film and television productions, including the 2013 short film Die Zwangsräumung alongside Uwe Preuss. At the age of 17, Jordan began working regularly in television and cinema productions; in 2017, she played Sarah Pichler in the episode "Zwiespalt" of the ZDF television series Der Bergdoktor. She played her first leading role in 2018 as the militant environmentalist Marie Bacher in the ZDF crime drama Kommissarin Lucas – Tote Erde.

In the NDR documentary Kinderschauspieler – Der Preis des Erfolgs ("Child Actors – The Price of Success"), Jordan, along with other former child stars, spoke about her early experiences in the film industry.

In 2019, Jordan joined the youth ensemble of the Deutsches Theater Berlin; her debut production was Verirrten sich im Wald by Robert Lehniger. That same year, she filmed an episodic leading role for the SOKO Donau/Wien episode "Graues Leben" (ZDF/ORF) and the leading role of Samira Spahic in the feature film Fox in a Hole (Fox in a Hole) directed by Arman T. Riahi, starring alongside Sibel Kekilli, Maria Hofstätter, Andreas Lust, and Aleksandar Petrović. In 2020, she appeared at the Kammerspiele of the Deutsches Theater in a production of Die Räuber (The Robbers).

In 2020, Jordan joined the main cast of the MagentaTV adventure series Wild Republic, portraying the character Steffi. The eight-part series was directed by Markus Goller and Lennart Ruff. This was followed by additional film and television roles.

The award-winning short film Furor, co-created by Luna Jordan and Frida Lindenau, screened in 2021 in the competition of the German Youth Film Prize (Deutscher Jugendfilmpreis) and at the Diagonale film festival. Jordan wrote the screenplay, which the feminist magazine An.schläge described as a "plea for the outward expression of female rage."

At the 2022 Austrian Film Awards, where Jordan won the award for Best Supporting Actress for her role in Fuchs im Bau, she used her acceptance speech to address sexualized violence and the abuse of power within the theater and film industries. She stated:

I am only 20 years old, and I have already been a victim of sexual abuse four times on film sets and in theater houses.

— Luna Jordan,

Her speech explicitly targeted a filmmaker present at the ceremony whom she accused of misconduct, while also appealing to other victims to "break the silence."

== Personal life and death ==
Jordan lived in Berlin and Vienna. She died suddenly and unexpectedly on 13 May 2026 at the age of 25 during filming of the BBC TV drama series Hamburg Days about The Beatles' time in Germany and in which she had been cast as Astrid Kirchherr.

== Filmography ==
=== As actress ===
- 2012: Dystonie
- 2013: Die Zwangsräumung (Short film)
- 2017: Der Bergdoktor (Episode: "Zwiespalt")
- 2019: Kommissarin Lucas (Episode: "Tote Erde")
- 2019: SOKO Donau/Wien (Episode: "Graues Leben")
- 2020: Die Heiland – Wir sind Anwalt (Episode: "Der Mann im Wald")
- 2020: Fuchs im Bau (Fox in a Hole)
- 2021: Wild Republic (Streaming series, 8 episodes)
- 2021: Polizeiruf 110 (Episode: "Frau Schrödingers Katze")
- 2021–2026: Jenseits der Spree (TV series)
- 2021: SOKO Hamburg (Episode: "Bronze, Silber, Tod")
- 2023: Dead Girls Dancing
- 2023: Schlafende Hunde (Sleeping Dog, Netflix series, 6 episodes)
- 2023: Nach uns der Rest der Welt
- 2024: Unschuldig – Der Fall Julia B. (TV two-part drama)
- 2024: Am Abgrund (Television film)
- 2024: Unsichtbarer Angreifer
- 2024: Sterben für Beginner (Television film)
- 2025: Euphorie (TV series, 7 episodes)
- 2025: Smalltown Girl
- 2026: Run Me Wild
- 2026: Polizeiruf 110 (Episode: "Your Body My Choice")

=== As filmmaker/screenwriter ===
- 2021: Furor (Short film)

== Awards and nominations ==
- 2021: Nominated – Filmfestival Max Ophüls Preis, Best Young Actress category
- 2021: Nominated – Romy, Most Popular Female Newcomer category
- 2022: Won – Austrian Film Award, Best Supporting Actress category (for her role in Fuchs im Bau)
- 2023: Nominated – Braunschweig International Film Festival, Braunschweig Film Prize for Best German-language Newcomer Actor (for her role in Dead Girls Dancing)
- 2023: Nominated – Förderpreis Neues Deutsches Kino (New German Cinema Grant), Best Acting Performance category (for her role in Dead Girls Dancing)
