= Sound of Falling =

2025 film by Mascha Schilinski

- German theatrical release poster
- German: In die Sonne schauen
- Directed by: Mascha Schilinski
- Written by: Mascha Schilinski; Louise Peter
- Produced by: Lucas Schmidt; Lasse Scharpen; Maren Schmitt
- Starring: Hanna Heckt; Lena Urzendowsky; Laeni Geiseler; Susanne Wuest; Luise Heyer; Lea Drinda
- Cinematography: Fabian Gamper
- Edited by: Evelyn Rack
- Music by: Michael Fiedler; Eike Hosenfeld
- Production companies: Studio Zentral; ZDF
- Distributed by: Neue Visionen
- Release dates: 14 May 2025 (Cannes); 28 August 2025 (Germany)
- Running time: 155 minutes
- Country: Germany
- Languages: German; Low German
- Box office: $5 million

Sound of Falling (German: In die Sonne schauen, lit. 'Looking into the sun') is a 2025 German drama film co-written and directed by Mascha Schilinski. Starring Hanna Heckt, Lena Urzendowsky, Laeni Geiseler, Susanne Wuest, Luise Heyer, and Lea Drinda, it follows four generations of girls connected by a farm in the Altmark, Germany.

The film premiered in competition at the 2025 Cannes Film Festival on 14 May 2025, where it won the Jury Prize. It was theatrically released in Germany by Neue Visionen on 28 August 2025. It was selected as the German entry for Best International Feature Film at the 98th Academy Awards, making the December shortlist, but was not nominated. It swept the 76th German Film Awards, winning every of the 10 categories it was nominated for, including Best Film, Director, and Screenplay.

== Plot ==
The film is structured non-linearly, shifting between the four different time periods, but all set on the same farmstead in the Altmark region, where gestures, conversations, and situations recur over time.

=== 1910s (Alma) ===
Alma, age 7, grows up on a rural farm with her many siblings. Alongside daily fieldwork and communal gatherings, death is a recurring presence. Alma witnesses burial preparations after a young boy named Erwin dies, and again when her great-grandmother Frieda passes. Inside, the house displays framed post-mortem photographs of deceased relatives, including of a dead child also named Alma. Alma is given a black dress that once belonged to that child, and she reenacts the pose from the photograph.

Alma’s older brother Fritz loses a leg from an alleged work accident, but Alma recalls her parents deliberately caused the injury in the barn, pushing Fritz from the threshing floor so he would be deemed unfit for military service. Fritz is confined to bed, in severe pain, and is intimately cared for by the young maid Trudi, who also tends to their mother Emma when her health deteriorates without medical explanation. Alma witnesses crude behavior by drunken farmhands, including Trudi being grabbed, and grows increasingly alert to the secrecy and silence of adults.

Alma experiences moments of isolation, including being left unseen during a game and falling ill with a fever. She secretly observes her parents arranging for her sister Lia, who is to be sent away to work as a maid for a stranger but commits suicide by throwing herself under a carriage. Soon afterward, her body is returned to the farm, and the family stages her post-mortem photograph, presenting her death as another "work accident." Alma is left with only images of her sister.

=== 1940s (Erika) ===
Teenage sisters Erika and Irm live on the same farm. Their Uncle Fritz, now in his 40s, remains bedridden with his leg amputation, while Erika’s older brother oversees farm labor. Erika pretends to be physically disabled by binding her leg and using crutches, and slips into Fritz’s room to silently observe him. After a daytime visit, her brother reacts violently to her ignoring his calls, while Erika responds with a defiant grin. After a separate nighttime visit, Erika slips back into bed beside Irm and avoids explaining her absence.

We also briefly see Erika at twilight as she joins a group of young women, some with children, who slowly wade fully-clothed into the river, looking outward as the water rises around them.

=== 1980s (Angelika) ===
Irm now lives on the farm with her husband Albat and teenage daughter Angelika, alongside her brother Uwe and his teenage son Rainer. When the family is introduced there are intimations that Angelika is a victim of sexual abuse from her uncle. Angelika observes Irm's humiliations during village gatherings, including a birthday car prank and an eel-catching party game, which Irm dismisses as harmless.

Angelika engages in provocative and boundary-testing behavior, including physical dares, drawing attention from men, and flirtation with her cousin Rainer and uncle Uwe. One night, Angelika returns home intoxicated, and Rainer sees her naked; they briefly lie together before Rainer angrily accuses her of sleeping with his father and leaves her alone, in tears.

Angelika tests her own safety, both assisting her father with a combine harvester, and swimming to a dangerous riverside in front of her mother. Angelika recounts how her mom Irm failed to drown herself as her aunt Erika did after the war. At a garden gathering, Angelika drifts off, plays with perception by removing her glasses and standing upside down, and dares Rainer to start a fire in the barn. During a family photo, Angelika runs away and appears only as a blurred, ghostly shape in the Polaroid. She is not seen again.

=== 2020s (Lenka) ===
Christa renovates the farmhouse with her husband Hannes and their daughters Lenka (12) and Nelly (5). Family life centers on shared meals, river outings, nighttime comfort, and play.

Lenka befriends Kaya, a confident older village girl whose mother recently died. Kaya arranges a sleepover at the farmhouse, where Christa sings her a lullaby. Lenka begins closely imitating Kaya: joining in her risky games, copying her ice cream choices, and adopting her confident posture.

During a game of hide-and-seek, Nelly climbs to the barn's threshing floor, spreads her arms, jumps, and is seen lying motionless in the hay.

== Cast ==
- Hanna Heckt as Alma
- Lena Urzendowsky as Angelika
- Laeni Geiseler as Lenka
- Susanne Wuest as Emma
- Luise Heyer as Christa
- Lea Drinda as Erika
- Florian Geißelmann as Rainer
- Greta Krämer as Lia
- Claudia Geisler-Bading as Irm
- Zoë Baier as Nelly
- Konstantin Lindhorst as Uwe
- Luzia Oppermann as Trudi
- Gode Benedix as Max
- Filip Schnack as Fritz
  - Martin Rother as older Fritz
- Andreas Anke as Albat
- Liane Düsterhöft as Frieda
- Lucas Prisor as Hannes
- Ninel Geiger as Kaya
- Helena Lüer as Gerti
- Anastasia Cherepakha as Hedda
- Bärbel Schwarz as Berta

== Production ==
=== Development ===
Co-writers Mascha Schilinski and Louise Peter were inspired to write the film after spending a summer on a farm in the Altmark. After seeing a photo of three women from 1920, Schilinski and Peter began imagining what the women's lives were like.

As we went through the rooms of the farmhouse, we could sense the centuries. It brought up a question I've had since childhood. What happened between these walls in the past? Who has sat right in the spot where I'm now sitting? What fates played out here? What did the people who lived here experience and feel?

— Mascha Schilinski

The screenplay was developed over three years under the working title The Doctor Says I'll Be Alright, But I'm Feelin' Blue. In 2023, it won the Thomas Strittmatter Screenplay Award by the MFG Filmförderung.

=== Casting ===
Over 1,400 girls auditioned for the four main characters. Schilinski stated that the production team searched for girls whose faces could represent the time period of each character. The casting process took place over the course of a year, and the cast comprises both experienced actors and newcomers.

=== Filming ===
Principal photography began in August 2023. The film was shot over 34 days in Neulingen and Vehlgast, both in Saxony-Anhalt. For a visual reference, the production team took inspiration from the works of American photographer Francesca Woodman. Filming was completed on 2 September 2023.

== Release ==
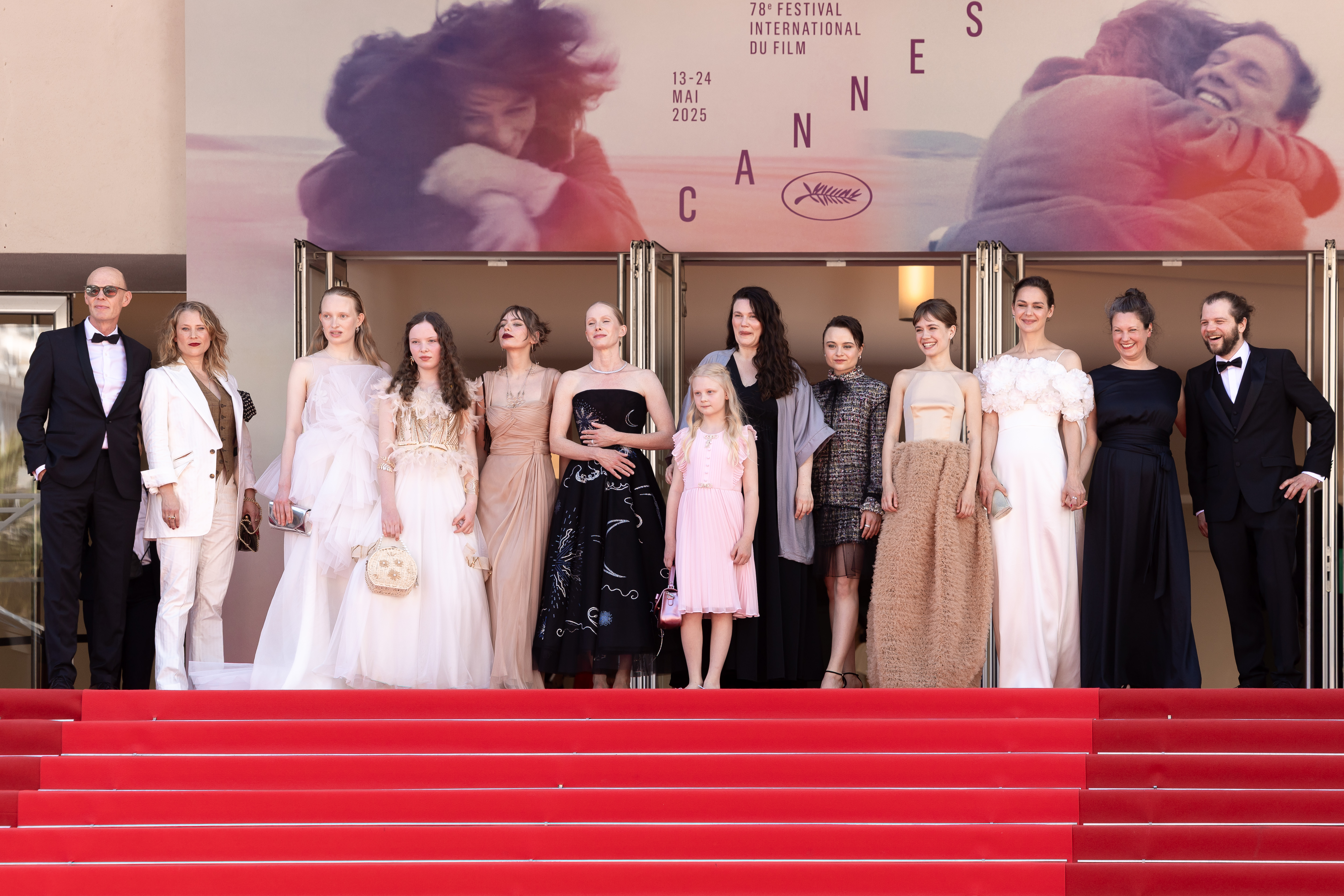
Cast and crew of the film at the 2025 Cannes Film Festival

The film was screened in the Work in Progress section of Les Arcs Film Festival in December 2023. mk2 Films acquired the international sales rights to the film in April 2025. A promotional clip and full trailer were released on 13 May 2025. The film had its world premiere in competition at the 78th Cannes Film Festival on 14 May 2025. It was the first film by a German female filmmaker to compete in the main competition of the festival since Maren Ade's Toni Erdmann in 2016.

Following its Cannes premiere, Mubi acquired the distribution rights for the film in North America, the UK, Ireland, Turkey, and India. The film received a theatrical release in Germany on 28 August 2025. The film also screened at the Toronto International Film Festival, the BFI London Film Festival, and the Valladolid International Film Festival.

It competed in the Stockholm Competition of the 2025 Stockholm International Film Festival on November 6, 2025.

== Reception ==
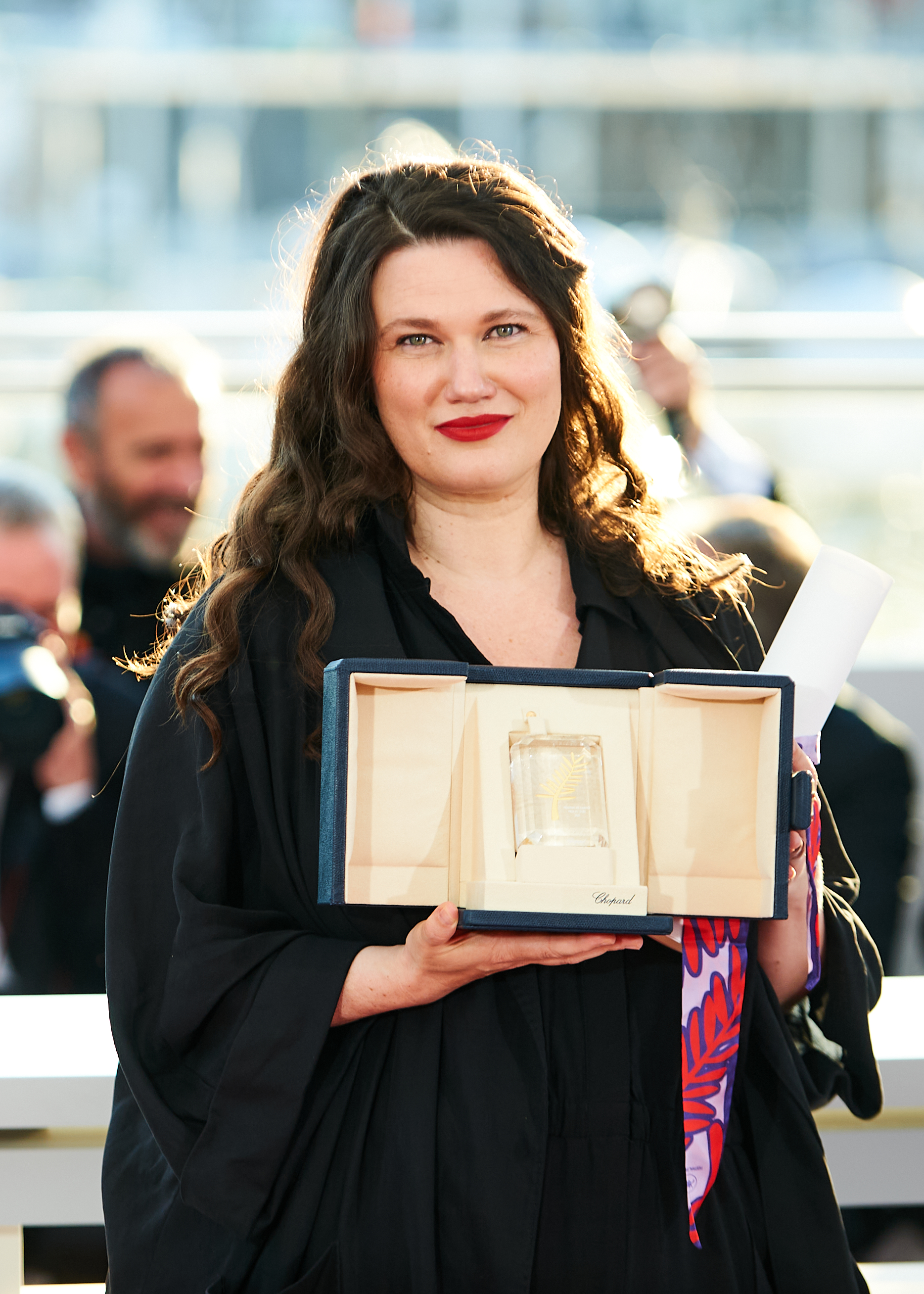
Mascha Schilinski holding the Jury Prize at the 2025 Cannes Film Festival

On the review aggregator website Rotten Tomatoes, 95% of 95 critics' reviews are positive, with an average rating of 8.1/10. The website's consensus reads: "Exquisitely well-crafted and laced with mordant humor, Sound of Falling is a haunting generational drama that announces Mascha Schillinski as a world-class directorial talent." Metacritic, which uses a weighted average, assigned the film a score of 90 out of 100, based on 26 critics, indicating "universal acclaim".

Guy Lodge of Variety called the film "exquisite" and "astonishingly poised and ambitious". He praised writer-director Mascha Schilinski and co-writer Louise Peter for constructing an intricate story of womanhood through the lens of the four main characters, noting that "no finer point of craft, performance or poetic nuance [was] rushed or neglected". He also commended Schilinski's direction and Fabian Gamper's cinematography. Damon Wise of Deadline praised the film, calling it "superb" and "a masterclass in ethereal, unnerving brilliance". He concluded that, "Cinema is too small a word for what this sprawling yet intimate epic achieves in its ethereal, unnerving brilliance; forget Cannes, forget the Competition, forget the whole year, even—Sound of Falling is an all-timer." David Ehrlich of IndieWire gave the film a grade of A− and wrote, "So tenderly in touch with the shared but unspoken traumas that are visited upon her cast of young women, Schilinski mines tremendous sorrow from the secret poetics of girlhood; she weaponizes cinema's ability to access the deepest interiors of human feeling, and swirls her characters together in a way that tortures them for their subjectivity."

Jordan Mintzer of The Hollywood Reporter commended the film's unique method of storytelling and wrote, "Sound of Falling is arthouse filmmaking with a capital A that will best appeal to patient audiences. They will be rewarded by a work that reminds us how the cinema can still reinvent itself, as long as there are directors like [Mascha] Schilinski audacious enough to try." Alison Willmore of Vulture called the film an "astonishing work, twining together the lives of four generations of families with an intricacy and intimacy that feels like an act of psychic transmission", while Wendy Ide of Screen Daily called it a "work of thrilling ambition" that "announces Schilinski as a talent of considerable note". Peter Bradshaw of The Guardian rated the film four out of five stars, noting that it was "dense with fear and sadness".

Emma Kiely of Collider, however, gave the film a score of 5 out of 10 and called it "a hollow, navel-gazing glamorization of female suicide, incest, sexual assault" as well as "a pretentious romanticization of the hardship women go through rather than an in-depth analysis of how systems and families can sit back and allow such trauma and suffering to claim women's lives." She criticized the underdevelopment of the characters and wrote that "the film is excessively grim to the point that it feels exploitative." Despite this, she commended Schilinski's direction, Gamper's cinematography, and the film's sound design.

=== Accolades ===
Award	Date of ceremony	Category	Recipient(s)	Result	Ref.
Athens International Film Festival	19 April 2025	Golden Athena	Sound of Falling	Won	
British Independent Film Awards	30 November 2025	Best International Independent Film	Mascha Schilinski, Louise Peter, Maren Schmitt, Lucas Schmidt	Nominated	
Camerimage	22 November 2025	Golden Frog	Fabian Gamper	Nominated	
Camerimage	22 November 2025	Silver Frog	Fabian Gamper	Won	
Cannes Film Festival	24 May 2025	Palme d'Or	Mascha Schilinski	Nominated	
Cannes Film Festival	24 May 2025	Jury Prize	Mascha Schilinski	Won	
Chicago International Film Festival	24 October 2025	Gold Hugo	Sound of Falling	Nominated	
Chicago International Film Festival	24 October 2025	Best Director	Mascha Schilinski	Won	
Chicago International Film Festival	24 October 2025	Best Sound	Sound of Falling	Won	
European Film Awards	17 January 2026	Best Film	Sound of Falling	Nominated	
European Film Awards	17 January 2026	Best Director	Mascha Schilinski	Nominated	
European Film Awards	17 January 2026	Best Screenwriter	Mascha Schilinski and Louise Peter	Nominated	
European Film Awards	17 January 2026	Best Casting Director	Karimah El-Giamal, Germany Jacqueline Rietz	Nominated	
European Film Awards	17 January 2026	European Cinematographer	Fabian Gamper	Nominated	
European Film Awards	17 January 2026	European Costume Designer	Sabrina Krämer	Won	
European Film Awards	17 January 2026	European Make-up & Hair Artist	Irina Schwarz, Anne-Marie Walther	Nominated	
European Film Awards	17 January 2026	European Composer (Original Score)	Michael Fiedler, Eike Hosenfeld	Nominated	
German Film Awards	29 May 2026	Best Fiction Film	Sound of Falling	Won	
German Film Awards	29 May 2026	Best Director	Mascha Schilinski	Won	
German Film Awards	29 May 2026	Best Screenplay	Mascha Schilinski, Louise Peter	Won	
German Film Awards	29 May 2026	Best Supporting Actress	Claudia Geisler-Bading	Nominated	
German Film Awards	29 May 2026	Best Supporting Actress	Lena Urzendowsky	Won	
German Film Awards	29 May 2026	Best Cinematography	Fabian Gamper	Won	
German Film Awards	29 May 2026	Best Editing	Evelyn Rack	Won	
German Film Awards	29 May 2026	Best Sound Editing	Claudio Demel, Billie Mind, Kai Tebbel, Sebastian Heyser, Jürgen Schulz	Won	
German Film Awards	29 May 2026	Best Production Design	Cosima Vellenzer, Maike Kiefer	Won	
German Film Awards	29 May 2026	Best Costume Design	Sabrina Krämer	Won	
German Film Awards	29 May 2026	Best Make-Up	Anne-Marie Walther, Irina Schwarz	Won	
Gotham Independent Film Awards	1 December 2025	Best Original Screenplay	Mascha Schilinski and Louise Peter	Nominated	
Gotham Independent Film Awards	1 December 2025	Best International Feature	Lucas Schmidt and Maren Schmitt	Nominated	
Jerusalem Film Festival	26 July 2025	Best Director – Special Mention	Mascha Schilinski	Won	
Melbourne International Film Festival	23 August 2025	Bright Horizons Competition	Mascha Schilinski	Nominated	
Stockholm International Film Festival	14 November 2025	Golden Horse	Sound of Falling	Nominated	
Stockholm International Film Festival	14 November 2025	Best Director	Mascha Schillinski	Won	
Valladolid International Film Festival	1 November 2025	Golden Spike	Sound of Falling	Nominated	

== See also ==
- List of submissions to the 98th Academy Awards for Best International Feature Film
- List of German submissions for the Academy Award for Best International Feature Film
