= Jürgen Vollmer =

German photographer

- Born: 11 July 1939 (age 86); Hamburg, Germany
- Occupation: Photographer
- Known for: Association with The Beatles in Hamburg in the early 1960s; Film photography; Photos of famous celebrities; Magazine photography/photojournalism

Jürgen Vollmer (born 11 July 1939) is a German international photographer, best known for his association with The Beatles in Hamburg during the band's early career. Vollmer, along with Astrid Kirchherr and Klaus Voormann (the "Exis"), befriended the band and were responsible for some of their most iconic images in their leather-clad days prior to Brian Epstein. Vollmer would go on to be a prominent photographer for films and celebrity photographer.

== Early life and Beatles ==
In April 1961, a few months before he moved from his hometown of Hamburg to Paris, Vollmer photographed the then-unknown Beatles as a student of photography. John Lennon would later use one of these photos in 1975 as the cover of his solo album Rock 'n' Roll. Lennon wrote in his foreword to Vollmer's photo book Rock 'n' Roll Times: "Jürgen Vollmer was the first photographer to capture the beauty and spirit of the Beatles. We tried very hard to find someone with his touch [...] nobody could."

The Beatles owe Vollmer their trademark "moptop" hairstyle. John Lennon is quoted in the Beatles anthology as saying: "Jürgen had a flattened-down hairstyle with a fringe in the front, which we rather took to. We went over to his place and there and then he cut our hair into the same style." Paul McCartney also confirmed several times in interviews that Vollmer created the Beatles hairstyle when they visited him in Paris in October 1961. Even as a schoolboy in the mid-1950s, Vollmer had always combed his hair forward, which was very unusual in Hamburg at the time. In the group of young artists who were friends of the Beatles in Hamburg, Vollmer was the first with such a hairstyle.

Paul McCartney wrote in his foreword to Vollmer's illustrated book From Hamburg to Hollywood, published in England in 1997: "[Jürgen's] sense of style and excellent photographic skills were to have a profound effect throughout our careers."

== Career ==
In Paris, Vollmer was initially an assistant to William Klein, for whose first two feature films he also took the still photos at the end of the 1960s, for the first, Who are you, Polly Magoo? (1966) also the poster photo. In addition to his photo reportage's for magazines and book publishers, Vollmer also frequently photographed during filming, including two films with Catherine Deneuve. One of his photos of Romy Schneider in Chimney No. 4 (1966) became the poster photo for the film. His photos of Rudolf Nureyev, taken in 1966 during the filming of a ballet film, were published in the US in 1975 in the photo book Nureyev in Paris.

Vollmer lived in New York in the 1970s and 1980s, and in Los Angeles in the early 1990s. In addition to his work as a photojournalist, he was art director for various magazines for the first ten years. His numerous travel reports resulted in two photo books: African Roots (1979) and Sex Appeal (1976). For the latter, William S. Burroughs wrote the preface, which ends with the words, "[...] [Vollmers] photos are realer than the flesh, realer than death".

For French films (including four by Alain Resnais), Vollmer travelled to Europe several times for the duration of the shooting and photographed, for example, Jeanne Moreau, Gérard Depardieu, Isabelle Adjani and Dirk Bogarde.

From the mid-1980s, Vollmer also took set and advertising photos for American films for ten years, such as films by Francis Ford Coppola and Roman Polański. Celebrities he photographed include Robert Redford, Tom Cruise, John Travolta, Madonna and Cher, and his photos were used several times for film posters, for example for The City Shark and Lord of the Tides.

Vollmer returned to Europe in the mid-1990s. He first lived briefly in Hamburg and then for a long time in Paris, where he photographed several times during filming, including for a film with Isabelle Huppert. His photos for the film It Begins Today by Bertrand Tavernier were published in an elaborate book on the film, one of them also as a film poster.

Since 2000, Vollmer has been living in Hamburg again. Since then, however, he has continued to work exclusively abroad, mostly as a set photographer for American films shot outside the USA. He photographed Gene Hackman, Denzel Washington, Brad Pitt, Angelina Jolie, among others, and took the poster photos for From Hell, Sin Eater and The League of Extraordinary Gentlemen. His portraits of female film stars often exude a "mysterious sensuality"," as stated in a major article about Vollmer in the German edition of Rolling Stone magazine in 2004.

His Beatles photos have been published in various books. Particularly noteworthy are Beatles in Hamburg (Schirmer/Mosel 2003) and From Hamburg to Hollywood (Genesis Publ. 1999). In 2009, steidl-Verlag published his retrospective photo book On Filmsets and Other Locations. A book with memoirs was published in May 2013 under the title How I Cut John Lennon's Hair, Ran Away from Romy Schneider and Made Catherine Deneuve Laugh.

== Publications by Vollmer ==
- Rock 'N' Roll Times: The Style and Spirit of the Early Beatles and Their First Fans. New York: Overlook, 1983. ISBN 978-0879511821.
- From Hamburg to Hollywood: Photographs and words by Jürgen Vollmer. Genesis Publications, 1997. ISBN 978-0904351569.
- Jürgen Vollmer: On Filmsets and other Locations. Steidl, 2009. ISBN 978-3865215987.
