= Höfner 500/5 =

Electric bass model

Höfner 500/5 President Bass
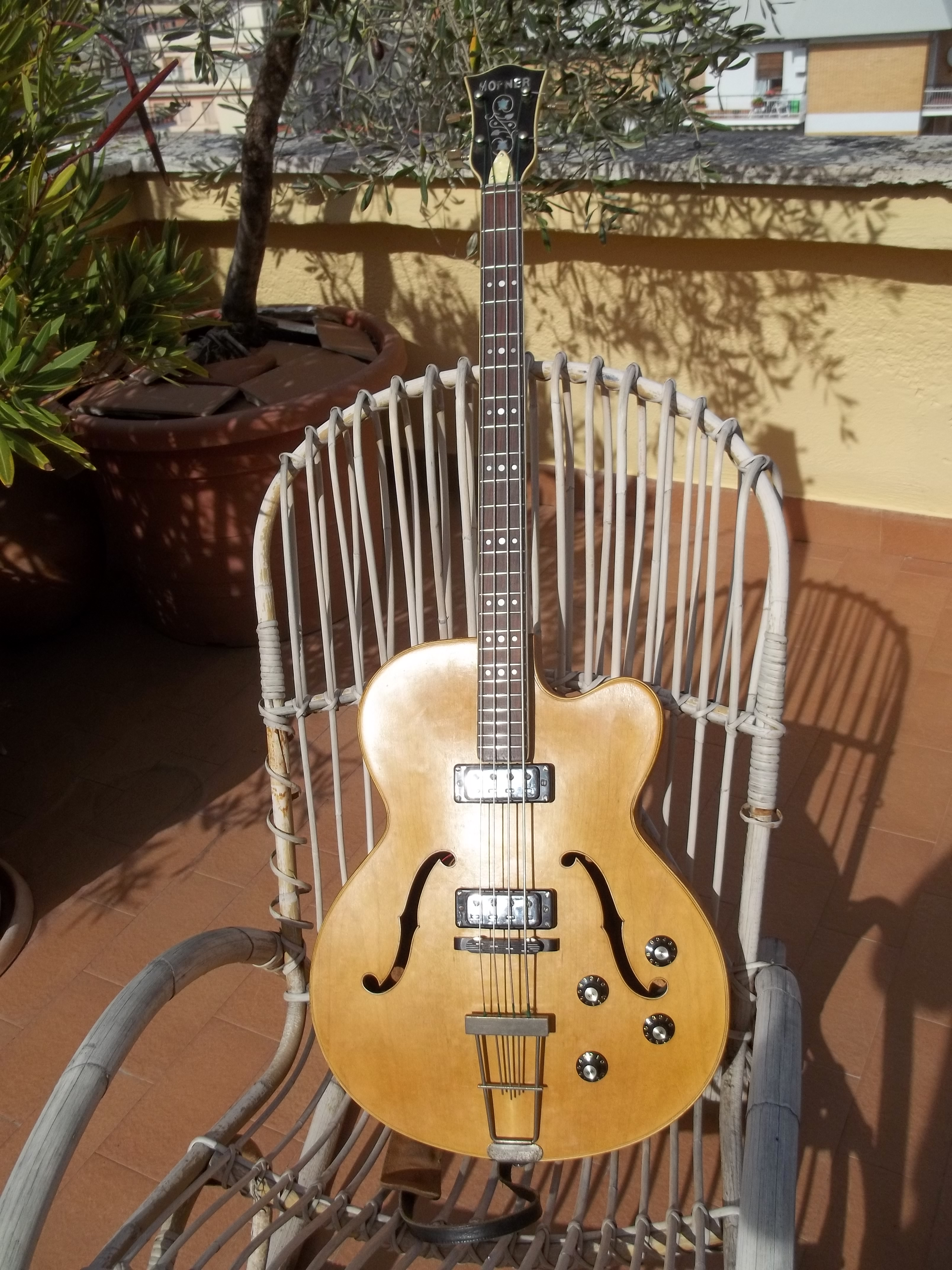
- Manufacturer: Karl Höfner GmbH & Co.
- Period: 1957–1979

Construction
- Body type: Hollow

Woods
- Neck: Maple
- Fretboard: Rosewood

Hardware
- Bridge: Höfner Ebony Bridge

Colors available
- Sunburst, black, laurel, blonde and many others

The Höfner 500/5, later known as the Höfner President Bass, was an electric bass guitar model which was sold from 1957 to 1979. It was notably used by Stuart Sutcliffe of The Beatles.

== Höfner 500/5 players ==
- Stuart Sutcliffe
- Syd Barrett of Pink Floyd
- Mark Colwill
- Paul McGuigan of Oasis
