= Wolf King =

British animated television series

- Season 1 promotional poster
- Genre: Epic fantasy; Adventure
- Based on: Wereworld by Curtis Jobling
- Written by: Curtis Jobling; Tim Compton; Julie Bower; Andrew Burrell; Celia Morgan
- Directed by: Tom Brass; Jerry Forder
- Voices of: Cel Spellman; Peter Serafinowicz; Kate Fleetwood; Rob Rackstraw; Nina Barker-Francis; Paterson Joseph; Samuel Anderson; Tom Rhys Harries; Chris Lew Kum Hoi; Georgia Lock; Ralph Ineson; David Dawson
- Composer: Thomas Haines
- Countries of origin: United Kingdom; United States
- Original language: English
- No. of seasons: 2
- No. of episodes: 16

Production
- Executive producers: Angelo Abela; Tim Compton
- Producers: Curtis Jobling; Barry Quinn
- Editor: Darren Millstone
- Running time: 22–32 minutes
- Production companies: Lime Pictures; Netflix Animation Studios

Original release
- Network: Netflix
- Release: March 20 – September 11, 2025

Wolf King is an animated epic fantasy-adventure television series based on the Wereworld novels by Curtis Jobling, who wrote ten episodes of the series. Produced by Lime Pictures for Netflix, the series stars Cel Spellman in the lead role of Drew Ferran. The first season premiered on March 20, 2025, and the second and final season premiered on September 11.

== Premise ==
In a land once subjugated by werelords, sixteen-year-old Drew Ferran realizes he is the last member in a long ancestral line of werewolves. Drew must confront and overthrow the tyrannical rule of the lionlords and reclaim the throne as the rightful wolf king.

== Voice cast and characters ==
- Cel Spellman as Drew Ferran, the titular character and main protagonist of the series. A young teenager who discovers he is not only the last werewolf, but the son and heir of the deposed wolf king Wergar. Honorable and courageous, Drew wants to protect his friends from their enemies.
- Louis Landau as Trent Ferran, Tilly and Mack's son and Drew's adoptive brother
- David Yip as:
  - Hamwell (Season 1), a farmer from the town of Motley
  - Baron Huth, the boarlord of Redmire and father of Hector and Vincent
- Kim Adis as Erin (Season 1), Hamwell's daughter and Drew's childhood friend
- Peter Serafinowicz as:
  - Mack Ferran (Season 1), Drew's adoptive father
  - Duke Manfred, the staglord of Stormdale and a longtime ally of Bergan
  - Count Kesslar (Season 2), a goatlord and Ewan's cousin, whom he usurped and took control of Haggard
- Kate Fleetwood as:
  - Tilly Ferran (Season 1), Drew's adoptive mother
  - Duchess Rainier (Season 1), Bergan's wife and the mother of Broghan and Whitley
  - Queen Amelie, the mother of Drew and Lucas and the queen of Lyssia. Following the death of her first husband, King Wergar, she sent Drew away as an infant for safety and was forced to marry King Leopold.
- Rob Rackstraw as:
  - Lord Vanmorten, a ratlord who serves King Leopold as one of his chief enforcers
  - Lord Vankaskan, a ratlord and Vanmorten's twin brother. He is a magister who is capable of casting and manipulating dark magic.
- Nina Barker Francis as Lady Whitley, a werebear, Bergan's daughter, and Gretchen's cousin, who becomes close friends with Drew. A spirited, rebellious, and fearless tomboy, Whitley is the first to discover that Drew is a werewolf and Lyssia's only hope to restore the balance.
- Kobna Holdbrook-Smith as:
  - Master Hogan (Season 1), the scoutmaster of Brackenholme and Whitley's mentor
  - Lord Orsino, an ally and cousin of King Leopold, who is among the catlords that rule the continent of Bast
  - Zadka Korga (Season 2), an elderly Romari traveler
- Paterson Joseph as Duke Bergan, the bearlord of Brackenholme and father of Broghan and Whitley, who is sworn to protect the future wolf king
- Samuel Anderson as Broghan, Bergan's son and Whitley's older brother, who is fiercely protective of his home and family
- Tom Rhys Harries as Prince Lucas, a lionlord and King Leopold's arrogant and selfish son who is betrothed to Gretchen
- Chris Lew Kum Hoi as Hector, the intellectual apprentice of Vankaskan, who becomes Drew's friend and confidante
- Georgia Lock as Lady Gretchen, known as the Rose of Hedgemoor, a werefox betrothed to Prince Lucas, who is initially stuck-up and spoiled, but shows a good deal of spunkiness and courage. At first, she looks down on Drew as a "mongrel", but Gretchen eventually warms up to him and comes to accept Drew as the true wolf king.
- Colin Ryan as:
  - Vincent, Hector's conniving younger brother, who is loyal to King Leopold and seeks to rule Redmire himself
  - Lord Conrad (Season 2), the horselord of Cape Gala
- Ralph Ineson as King Leopold, the lionlord of Highcliff and Prince Lucas' father. Originally from Bast, he is the tyrannical ruler of the continent of Lyssia and the main antagonist of the series.
- David Dawson as Count Vega, a sharklord and former ruler of the Cluster Isles. He now lives a life of piracy aboard his ship, the Maelstrom.
- Rasmus Hardiker as:
  - Earl Mikkel, a staglord and Manfred's younger brother
  - Ringlin (Season 2), the captain of the Boarguard and Hector's bodyguard
- Anna Savva as Baba Korga (Season 2), the spiritual leader of a group of Romari travelers
- Paul Antony-Barber as Baron Ewan (Season 2), the former ramlord of Haggard and a skilled magister

== Episodes ==
=== Series overview ===
Series overview
Season	Episodes	Originally released
1	8	March 20, 2025
2	8	September 11, 2025

=== Season 1 (2025) ===
No. overall	No. in season	Title	Directed by	Written by	Original release date
1	1	"The Rise of the Wolf"	Tom Brass	Curtis Jobling; Tim Compton	March 20, 2025
Sixteen-year-old Drew Ferran lives a normal life on a farm near Motley, a small village on the Cold Coast, alongside his parents Mack and Tilly and brother Trent. When Tilly notes the Hunter's Moon is rising, which begins to affect Drew, she informs Mack that they must share a long-held secret with their son about his origins. While his father and brother are away, Tilly prepares to speak to Drew, but they are attacked by a wererat with red eyes, which kills Tilly and escapes. During the fight, Drew's eyes begin to glow yellow and he partially gains canine features. Hearing screams, Mack and Trent return home and believe Drew has killed Tilly, forcing him to flee into the Dyrewoods with his mother's sword. Heeding her final words, Drew plans to escape to Brackenholme to speak with Duke Bergan, but is caught in a snare by Whitley, who is completing her scout training alongside her master, Hogan. When they are ambushed by the local monstrous Wyldermen, Drew helps fend off the attack and protects a wounded Hogan. They make it to Brackenholme, where Bergan transforms into his werebear form to repel the last of the Wyldermen. Revealed to be Whitley's father, Bergan refuses to speak to Drew and demands that he leave, telling his daughter that King Leopold's Lionguard soldiers are already there. Surrounded by Brackenholme troopers, Drew fully transforms into a werewolf for the first time. Drew transforms back, and Bergan drags Drew towards the city.
2	2	"Brackenholme"	Tom Brass	Curtis Jobling	March 20, 2025
Drew is imprisoned in Brackenholme and is informed by Broghan, the Duke's son and Whitley's brother, that Bergan will speak to him after the Lionguard have left the city. Alongside the soldiers, King Leopod's son Lucas is in Brackenholme for his betrothal to Bergan's niece Gretchen, accompanied by ratlord magister Vankaskan and his apprentice Hector. Believing that Hector's training can help her determine Drew's true heritage, Whitley tricks the guards into allowing them access to the prison, and they realize that the discovery of a new wolflord is a threat to Leopold and Lucas' claim to the throne of Lyssia. During the betrothal feast, Lucas and Vankaskan question Bergan and his family about their prisoner, but they do not reveal Drew's identity. Lucas notices claw marks on Hector's hand, deduces that the prisoner is a werelord, and orders the prisoner be brought to him. Drew escapes from his cell and is intercepted by Whitley. They fight briefly, but Drew is forced to transform into a wolf to save her from a fall, and they land in the Brackenholme market. The townspeople are happy they are seeing a wolflord, while Lucas grows enraged.
3	3	"The Caged Beast"	Tom Brass	Curtis Jobling	March 20, 2025
Duke Bergan reveals to Drew that he is the son and heir of the wolflord Wergar. Lucas and Vankaskan interrogate Drew after killing the guard standing watch over his room, with Vankaskan attacking Drew using his dark magic. Drew insists that he just wanted to speak with Bergan, as per his mother's request, which Lucas interprets as a treasonous attempt with the Bear Lord to overthrow King Leopold. Hector warns Whitley and Broghan about Lucas' plans, and they rush to rescue him. Vincent, Hector's brother and a loyalist to the lions, convinces their father, Baron Huth, not to intervene, and later asserts to Hector that he will assume the title of Baron of Redmire when their father dies, threatening to kill Hector if he tries to prevent this. Lucas moves forward with his betrothal ceremony to Gretchen so that he can depart from Brackenholme as soon as possible, planning to take Drew with him as his prisoner. Whitley, Broghan, Hector, and Bergan help Drew to escape the city, reluctantly aided by Gretchen. The escape culminates in a battle with Lucas and his guards, during which Baron Huth is killed by Vankaskan, revealing himself to have a blade made of silver, along with the rest of the Lionguards' blades. Cornered, Drew is forced to cut the ropes to a lift to escape, sending it plummeting towards the river with him, Hector, and Gretchen inside.
4	4	"The Wyrmwood"	Tom Brass	Curtis Jobling	March 20, 2025
The trio survives the fall and flees Brackenholme in a rowboat. Gretchen and Drew argue, with the former furious that Drew has ruined her wedding and forced her to leave home against her will. She later tries to abandon the boys, but is captured by a Wyldermen tribe who worship Vala, a wereserpent werelord who cast her humanity aside and succumbed to her reptilian nature. Hector uses a forbidden communing ritual to reanimate a Coldwood, a Wylderman shaman killed by Drew, and find out where they are holding Gretchen, whom the tribe plans to sacrifice to Vala. Upon finding and rescuing her, Vala reveals herself and ambushes the group, but is ultimately defeated by Drew after a fierce battle. Drew suddenly collapses, having been poisoned by Vala's venomous bite during the struggle. Dragging him to the boat, Hector and Gretchen decide to head to the nearby village of Motley. Hector notices a black mark on his palm that he is unable to remove and hallucinates Coldwood attacking him, indicating that something had gone wrong with his earlier ritual.
5	5	"Return to Motley"	Tom Brass	Julie Bower	March 20, 2025
Vala's poison causes Drew to experience nightmares of being taken over by his werewolf side, and makes him act aggressively towards his friends. Waking up, Drew realizes the group is back in Motley and warns Hector and Gretchen that the townspeople blame him for murdering his mother. They come across a prisoner, Hamwell, who tells Drew that the Lionsguard tore the town apart searching for him. Drew reaches his family farm and finds it destroyed before fleeing and stumbling upon his mother's grave. As the poison continues to affect Drew's behaviour, the group inadvertently discovers a chest that Tilly had kept hidden. Inside are symbols of loyalty from three werelords (the bears, the stags, and the sharks) promising to protect him. They resolve to find Vega, the pirate captain wereshark, and ask for his aid. Victor gains permission from Leopold to court Whitley, much to her frustration, and Bergan reluctantly agrees to avoid suspicion from the crown. The Lionsguard kills Drew's childhood friend Erin, and he loses control, shifting into a werewolf and cornering Gretchen.
6	6	"The Maelstrom"	Tom Brass	Andrew Burrell	March 20, 2025
Hector calms Drew and convinces him to change back into his human form. Traveling to All Hallows Bay, the group finds Count Vega at a local inn and is granted passage on his ship, the Maelstrom, after Hector shows him the symbol they found at the farmhouse. Drew and Gretchen reconcile, but she chooses to stay behind and plans to travel back to Brackenholme to marry Lucas. Bergan and Whitley are summoned to an audience with King Leopold at Highcliff and are mocked by Lucas, who forces Whitley to be a bridesmaid at his upcoming wedding. He later threatens Whitley not to step out of line. Vega trains Drew in combat and advises him on how to control his werelord powers and harness them without being overcome. Exploring the Maelstrom, Hector finds Gretchen has been taken captive and discovers that Vega plans to take the group to Highcliff to gain favour with the King. Drew fights Vega but is overpowered.
7	7	"Chained"	Tom Brass	Celia Morgan; Tim Compton	March 20, 2025
The Maelstrom docks in Highcliff, and Vega presents Drew to King Leopold for a reward, while Gretchen and Hector are returned to Lucas and Vankaskan. When Vega tries to extort Leopold and reclaim his home in the Cluster Isles, Leopold denies him. Leopold tells Drew he will be executed on the morning of the royal wedding. Bergan and Whitley meet up with the stag lords Mikkel and Manfred, two of King Weregar's staunchest allies, and they break Drew free of his imprisonment, but Drew later surrenders to Lucas when he and his guards corner Whitley. As punishment, Leopold assigns Whitley to serve Queen Amelie, who is trapped in a trance-like state thanks to Vankaskan's dark magic. Gretchen expresses second thoughts to Hector about marrying Lucas, and tries to convince Lucas to spare Drew. When he is undeterred, she steals the key to Drew's cell, but he refuses to take it out of fear that she will be hurt when Lucas and Leopold find out that she betrayed them. Bergan confronts Vega for turning his back on the wolves, and inadvertently discovers that Mack and Trent have joined the Lionsguard.
8	8	"The Fall of the Lion"	Tom Brass	Curtis Jobling	March 20, 2025
Mack and Trent find Drew's cell and try to kill him. Drew explains that he thinks Leopold sent one of his ratlords to kill Tilly, but they are unconvinced. Mack is unable to go through with killing Drew, and they resolve to let him be executed instead. Leopold decides to execute Drew personally, revealing to the audience a giant vat of molten silver for that purpose, but Mack and a group of wolf loyalists stop him. Having been given a potion earlier by Hector, Queen Amelie reawakens and declares Drew the rightful heir of Lyssia. Gretchen breaks off her marriage to Lucas, who flees after losing the ensuing fight against her and Whitley. Bergan and Manfred fight Leopold, forcing him to retreat into his palace. Drew realizes that Vankaskan's brother, Vanmorten, is the one who killed his mother and engages him in battle; though he is unable to prevent him from also killing Mack, who reconciles with Drew before his death. Amelie apologizes for sending Drew away, stating that she believed he would be safer with Tilly and Mack. Drew attempts to kill Leopold, but is pursued by Vanmorten. With Vega's aid, they critically wound Vanmorten and escape the palace by leaping from the roof into the ocean. Drew wakes on the Maelstrom and reunites with his birth mother Amelie, and the rest of his friends, who promise to help Drew take the throne. Still loyal to Leopold, Trent travels to Bast to seek allies who will help him gain vengeance against his brother.

=== Season 2 (2025) ===
No. overall	No. in season	Title	Directed by	Written by	Original release date
9	1	"The Wolf in Waiting"	Tom Brass	Curtis Jobling	September 11, 2025
Drew is struggling with duties as the Wolf King and his determination to find his vengeful brother Trent. After Drew makes clumsy and half-hearted attempt to propose marriage to her, Gretchen is kidnapped by Prince Lucas. Prompted by a desperate Drew, Hector reanimates a dead guard who tells an ominous prophesy involving the death of Drew. Undeterred, Drew and Whitley follow after Gretchen.
10	2	"Baba Korga"	Tom Brass	Julie Bower	September 11, 2025
Gretchen tries to use her emerging Werefox powers to escape from Lucas. Drew and Whitley encounter the Romari, a Romani-like people. Their leader, Baba Korga is trying to heal a wounded man who has been bitten by a dead werelion guard reanimated by Vankaskan's necromancy (a zombie). Eventually the old man dies and becomes a zombie. Drew discovers that his sword can disintegrate the undead. Whitley is bitten by an old zombie.
11	3	"Biting Point"	Jerry Forder	Andrew Burrell	September 11, 2025
Whitley hides her injury from Drew, out of fear that he will reject her. Baba Kroga gives her a map to Baron Ewan, a magister who is skilled in preventing people from becoming the undead. Drew eventually realizes what's wrong with Whitley and abandons his mission to rescue Gretchen to save Whitley. Meanwhile, Hector receives an unexpected visit from his brother Vincent. Vincent blackmails Hector, threatening to reveal his practice of necromancy unless he hands his dukedom over. During a scuffle, Hector accidentally pushes Vincent to his death and is soon tormented by his brother's shadowy ghost.
12	4	"Hell Comes to Haggard"	Tom Brass	Curtis Jobling	September 11, 2025
Drew and Whitley arrive in Haggard, only discover that the town is overrun by a fiery, tyrannical weregoat warlord, Count Kessler. Baron Ewan has been reduced to being a reluctant jailor, enslaving the town's population in a magical trance. Drew convinces Baron Ewan to heal Whitley, who in turn puts Drew into a trance - causing the former to become haunted by a villainous version of himself who taunts him for abandoning everyone. Drew identifies it as his fear and manages to overcome his trance. With the help of Whitley's brother, Drew and Whitley manage to free Baron Ewan and everyone from the burning town. Back at the castle, an attempt is made against King Leopold which fails and results in the death of Earl Mikkel at the king's claws.
13	5	"The Gathering Storm"	Jerry Forder	Celia Morgan	September 11, 2025
Drew and the refugees find their way in the kingdom of a Horse Lord's kingdom. Whitley notices something fishy and tries to warn Drew. It is discovered that the Horse Lord is in league with Lions.
14	6	"The Reckoning"	Tom Brass	Julie Bower	September 11, 2025
Drew encounters a vengeful Trent and they battle, which ends in stale-mate. Lord Orsino, an ally to the lion lords (as well as cousin to King Leopold), orders Prince Lucas to shoot at Drew. Gretchen distracts him to the point where he loses his aim. Trent is hit instead and a devastated Drew jumps after him to save him. An enraged Lucas tries to kill Gretchen with a crossbow. Broghan throws himself in front of Gretchen, sacrificing himself in the process.
15	7	"Hunted"	Jerry Forder	Curtis Jobling	September 11, 2025
Traumatized and grief-stricken by Broghan's death, Gretchen struggles to break the news to Whitley. Meanwhile, Lord Bergan bravely battles King Leopold and seemingly dies in the conflict. Count Vega, Queen Amelie and Hector are forced to retreat. In the process, Amelie discovers Hector's secret. While initially angry, Amelie makes Hector promise to refrain from using necromancy. Baron Ewan betrays Drew, Whitley and Gretchen. Drew finds himself in chains, at the mercy of Vankaskan. Vankaskan proceeds to torture Drew by having him tormented by Broghan's reanimated corpse.
16	8	"The Fall of the Wolf"	Tom Brass	Curtis Jobling	September 11, 2025
While Drew deals with Vanmorten, Gretchen and Whitley are captured by the Romari. Whitley recognizes Baba Kroga and is reunited with her horse, Chancer. Gretchen also discovers the Horse Lord and Baron Ewan in the camp, they both betrayed Drew out of fear of the lions. Gretchen admonishes them for being "sheep" and rallies the Romari to fight back with Whitley. Drew manages to free himself at the loss of his hand and fights Vankaskan. Drew destroys Vankaskan's controls, causing the zombified victims of his necromancy to turn on Vankaskan. Vankaskan is devoured and Drew manages to escape by letting himself fall off the ledge, faking his death in the process. Lord Orsino and Prince Lucas return to Lyssia, only to discover a drunk Leopold. Disgusted by apparent fact that he went out of his way to rescue a drunk, Lord Orsino orders an equally disgusted Prince Lucas to kill Leopold. Vanmorten, who is also disillusioned by Leopold's leadership, restrains Leopold as Lucas stabs his own father with his knife. Lucas is crowned as the new lion lord. Drew is picked up by Count Kessler's werehawk minion and is delivered to his ship. The series ends in a cliffhanger with Drew revealing his identity as the Wolf King to the astonished Kessler, his eyes glowing yellow.

== Production ==
The series was first announced in June 2022, initially bearing the same title as the source material. In June 2024, during Netflix's Next On Netflix: Animation upfront presentation, the official title Wolf King was revealed with a 2025 release window and that Tom Brass would be directing. Wereworld author and creator Curtis Jobling was revealed to serve as a producer, alongside Angelo Abela, Tim Compton and Barry Quinn. Jellyfish Pictures in London and Assemblage Entertainment in Mumbai provided animation services for the series.

In August 2025, the second season was confirmed as the final season of the series.

== Release ==
In September 2024, an announcement teaser was unveiled during Netflix's virtual Geeked Week event. In February 2025, a full-length trailer was released.

All eight episodes of the first season of Wolf King premiered on March 20, 2025. The second and final season, also consisting of eight episodes, premiered on September 11.

== Awards and nominations ==
Year	Organisation	Category	Project	Result	Ref.
2025	Children's and Family Emmy Awards	Outstanding Children's or Young Teen Animated Series	Wolf King	Nominated	
2025	Children's and Family Emmy Awards	Outstanding Directing for an Animated Series	TBA	Nominated	
