= Louis Landau =

English actor

- Born: Matthew Louis Landau; Bristol, England
- Education: Guildhall School of Music and Drama
- Years active: 2022–present

Matthew Louis Landau is an English actor. On television, he is known for his roles in the Disney+ series Rivals (2024–) and the Amazon Prime series Butterfly (2025).

== Early life ==
Landau is from Bristol. Landau graduated from the Guildhall School of Music and Drama in 2020.

== Career ==
In 2022, Landau made his television debut portraying Dauphin François in the first series of the Starz historical drama The Serpent Queen and his feature film debut with a supporting role in the romance film Surprised by Oxford as Edward. He next played Oliver Miller in the ZDF series Concordia, which premiered in 2023 and continued into 2024.

Also in 2024, Landau began playing Archie Baddingham in the Disney+ adaptation of Rivals. He made his professional stage debut in the world premiere of Charlotte Jones' Redlands at Chichester Festival Theatre. In 2025, Landau starred as Oliver Barnes in the Amazon Prime series Butterfly and voiced Trent Ferran in the Netflix animated series Wolf King.

Landau is set to portray Stuart Sutcliffe in the BBC One series Hamburg Days and Billy Cavendish in the Netflix series Kennedy.

== Filmography ==
=== Film ===
Year	Title	Role	Notes
2022	Surprised by Oxford	Edward	
2023	Selby Love	Michael Blenkin	Short film

=== Television ===
Year	Title	Role	Notes
2022	The Serpent Queen	Dauphin François	3 episodes
2023–2024	Concordia	Oliver Miller	5 episodes
2024–present	Rivals	Archie Baddingham	
2025	Wolf King	Trent Ferran	Voice role (4 episodes)
2025	Butterfly	Oliver Barnes	Main role
TBA	Hamburg Days	Stuart Sutcliffe	
TBA	Kennedy	Billy Cavendish	
