= Exi (subculture) =

1950s youth movement in Hamburg

The Exis (German: [ˈɛksiːs]) were a 1950s youth movement in Hamburg, West Germany. The Exis took their name from the existentialist movement, and were influenced by its chief proponents Jean-Paul Sartre and Albert Camus.

== Parallels ==
A few of the Hamburg fans of the Beatles in the period 1960–1962 regarded themselves as "Exis". Some may call the Exis the spiritual successors of the Swing Kids of the 1930s: both movements were heavily influenced by the prevailing popular culture and music of the United States (1930s jazz, in the case of the Swing Kids or 1950s rock and roll, in the case of the Exis).

The biggest difference between the two movements was that, where the Swing Kids wholeheartedly embraced American culture (right down to zoot suits and bobby socks), Exis generally wanted to show that they could think for themselves.

== Post-war ties between Britain and Hamburg ==
One of the factors which strengthened the link between British musical acts and the Hamburg clubs, was the presence of large numbers of British servicemen (see British Army of the Rhine) in the north-west of Germany. In the aftermath of the Second World War, it became common practice for music promoters in north Western Germany to book British acts. After 1955, they were "guests" on the territory of an ally and NATO member. Before the establishment of the Federal Republic of Germany (i.e. West Germany) in 1949, the British forces had actually governed their sector.

== St. Pauli ==
The St. Pauli district was a place for sailors to relax and artisans to experiment with new ideas, long before the Reeperbahn became internationally famous.

== Influences on fashions and image ==
While the fashion choices of some Exis had a slightly preppy or conservative quality, many sought to distance themselves from the blue jean, check-shirt wearing excesses of President Dwight D. Eisenhower's America, by projecting a somewhat darker and more introspective image. Sartre's black polo-neck sweaters and Gauloises cigarettes were the most prominent symbols. In an interview with NPR, Astrid Kirchherr described the Exis style in Hamburg as consisting of black clothes and very long scarves trailing to the floor.

However some American icons of the time, such as James Dean and Marlon Brando, in the eyes of most middle-aged Americans of the 1950s, were young rebels, rather than suitable role models for the nation's youth.

The dress of British and American rockers and bikers, the vast majority of whom had not been anywhere near Hamburg, was not vastly different from some of the Exis.
