= Das verhexte Fischerdorf =

1962 film

- Directed by: Siegfried Hartmann
- Release date: 1962
- Country: East Germany
- Language: German

Das verhexte Fischerdorf is an East German film. It was released in 1962.
