= Astrid Kirchherr =

German photographer and artist (1938–2020)

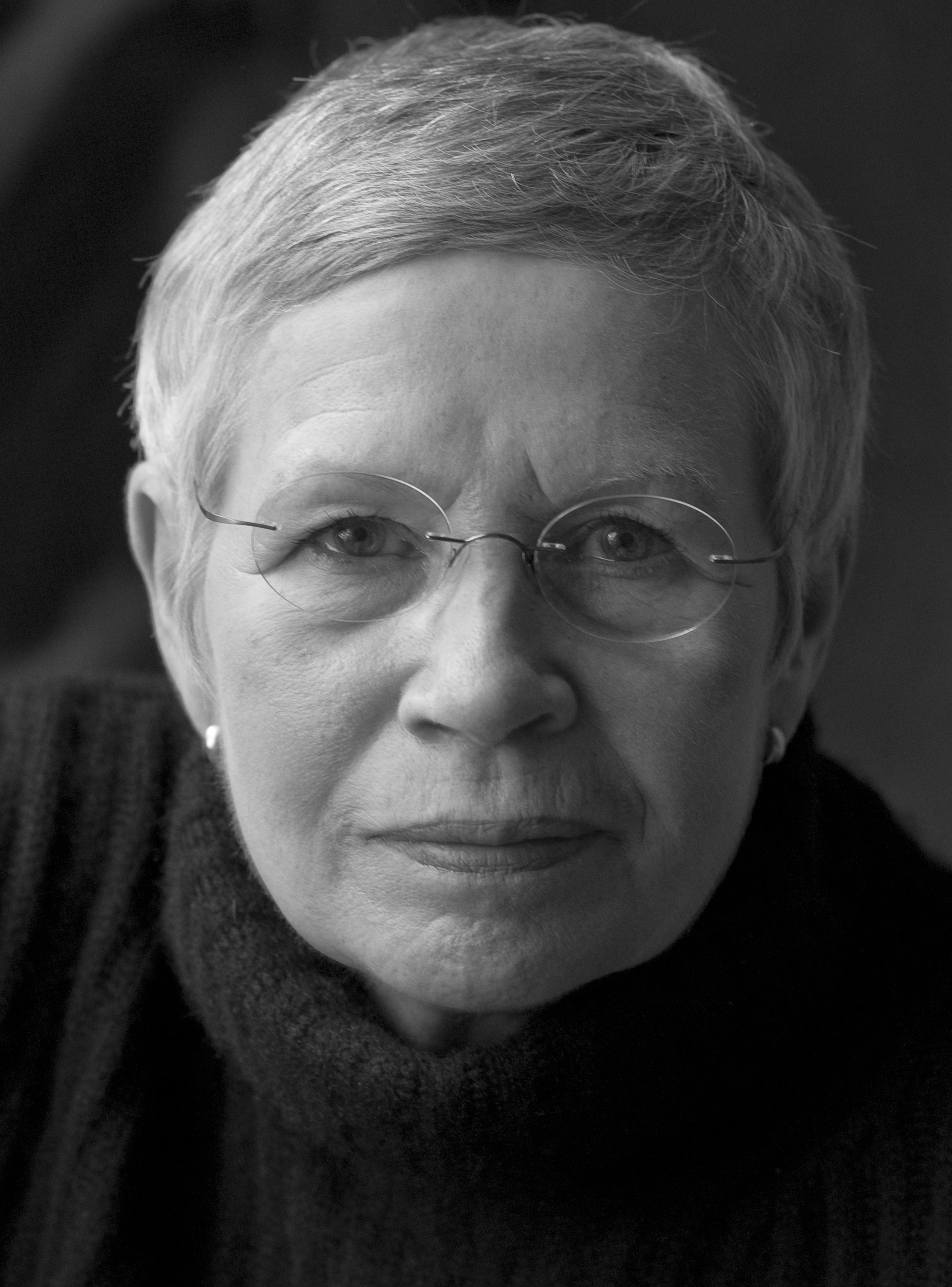
- Kirchherr in 2010
- Born: 20 May 1938; Hamburg, Germany
- Died: 12 May 2020 (aged 81); Hamburg, Germany
- Occupations: Photographer, artist
- Years active: 1959−2020
- Spouses: Gibson Kemp (m. 1967; div. 1974) One other divorce
- Partner: Stuart Sutcliffe (1960–1962; his death)

Astrid Kirchherr (German: [ˈastʁɪt ˈkɪʁçhɛʁ]; 20 May 1938 – 12 May 2020) was a German photographer and artist known for her association with the Beatles (along with her friends Klaus Voormann and Jürgen Vollmer) and her photographs of the band's original members — John Lennon, Paul McCartney, George Harrison, Stuart Sutcliffe and Pete Best — during their early days in Hamburg.

Kirchherr met artist Stuart Sutcliffe in the Kaiserkeller bar in Hamburg in 1960, where Sutcliffe was playing bass with the Beatles, and was later engaged to him, before his death in 1962. Although Kirchherr shot very few photographs after 1967, her early work has been exhibited in Hamburg, Bremen, London, Liverpool, New York City, Washington, D.C., Tokyo, Vienna, and at the Rock 'n' Roll Hall of Fame. She published three limited-edition books of photographs.

== Early life ==
Kirchherr was born on 20 May 1938 in Hamburg, Germany, and was the daughter of a former executive of the German branch of the Ford Motor Company and was brought up by her widowed mother, Nielsa Kirchherr, on Eimsbütteler Strasse, in a wealthy part of the Hamburg suburb of Altona. During World War II, she was evacuated to the safety of the Baltic Sea where she remembered seeing dead bodies on the shore (after the ships Cap Arcona and the SS Deutschland had been bombed and sunk) and the destruction in Hamburg when she returned.

After her graduation, Kirchherr enrolled in the Meisterschule für Mode, Textil, Grafik und Werbung in Hamburg, as she wanted to study fashion design but demonstrated a talent for black-and-white photography. Reinhard Wolf, the school's main photographic tutor, convinced her to switch courses and promised that he would hire her as his assistant when she graduated. Kirchherr worked for Wolf as his assistant from 1959 until 1963.

In the late 1950s and early 1960s, Kirchherr and her art school friends were involved in the European existentialist movement whose followers were later nicknamed "Exis" by Lennon. In 1995, she told BBC Radio Merseyside: "Our philosophy then, because we were only little kids, was wearing black clothes and going around looking moody. Of course, we had a clue who Jean-Paul Sartre was. We got inspired by all the French artists and writers, because that was the closest we could get. England was so far away, and America was out of the question. So France was the nearest. So we got all the information from France, and we tried to dress like the French existentialists... We wanted to be free, we wanted to be different, and tried to be cool, as we call it now."

== The Beatles ==
Kirchherr, Voormann and Vollmer were friends who had all attended the Meisterschule, and shared the same ideas about fashion, culture and music. Voormann became Astrid's boyfriend, and moved into the Kirchherr home, where he had his own room. In 1960, after Voorman had an argument with Kirchherr and Vollmer, he wandered down the Reeperbahn (in the St. Pauli district of Hamburg) and heard music coming from the Kaiserkeller club. Voormann walked in and watched a performance by a group called the Beatles: Lennon, McCartney, Harrison, Sutcliffe and Best, their drummer at the time. Voormann asked Kirchherr and Vollmer to listen to this new music, and after being persuaded to visit the Kaiserkeller (which was in the rough area of the Reeperbahn), Kirchherr decided that all she wanted to do was to be as close to the Beatles as she could. The trio of friends had never heard rock n' roll before, having previously listened to only trad jazz, with some Nat King Cole and The Platters mixed in. The trio then visited the Kaiserkeller almost every night, arriving at 9 o'clock and sitting by the front of the stage. Kirchherr later said: "It was like a merry-go-round in my head, they looked absolutely astonishing... My whole life changed in a couple of minutes. All I wanted was to be with them and to know them."

Kirchherr later said that she, Voormann and Vollmer felt guilty about being German, and about Germany's recent history. Meeting the Beatles was something very special for her, although she knew that English people would think that she ate sauerkraut, and would comment on her heavy German accent, but they made jokes about it together. Lennon would make sarcastic remarks from the stage, saying "You Krauts, we won the war", knowing that very few Germans in the audience spoke English, but sailors from English-speaking countries present would roar with laughter.

Sutcliffe was fascinated by the trio, but especially Kirchherr, and thought they looked like "real bohemians". Bill Harry later said that when Kirchherr walked in, every head would immediately turn her way, and that she always captivated the whole room. Sutcliffe wrote to a friend that he could hardly take his eyes off her and had tried to talk to Kirchherr during the next break, but she had already left the club. Sutcliffe managed to meet them eventually, and learned that all three had attended the Meisterschule, which was the same type of art college that Lennon and Sutcliffe had attended in Liverpool. (The Meisterschule für Mode, Textil, Grafik und Werbung - Master Craftspeoples' College for Fashion, Textile, Graphics, and Advertising - now called the University of Applied Sciences).

== Photographs ==
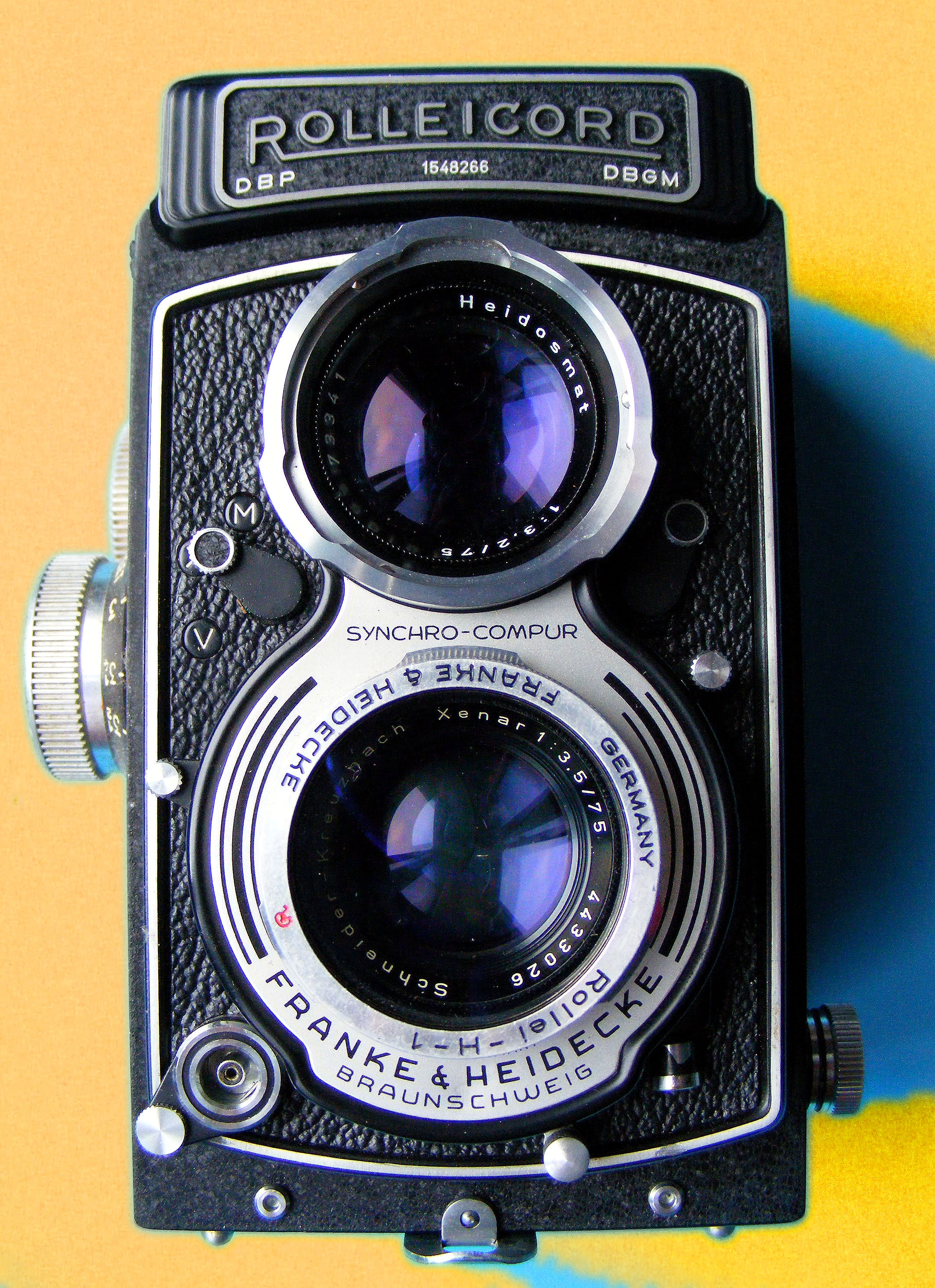
A Rolleicord camera (1955), which Kirchherr used

Kirchherr asked the Beatles if they would mind letting her take photographs of them in a photo session, which impressed them, as other groups had only snapshots that were taken by friends. The next morning Kirchherr took photographs with a Rolleicord camera, at a fairground in a municipal park called Hamburger Dom which was close to the Reeperbahn, and in the afternoon she took them all (minus Best, who decided not to go) to her mother's house in Altona. Kirchherr's bedroom (which was all in black, including the furniture, with silver foil on the walls and a large tree branch suspended from the ceiling), was decorated especially for Voormann, with whom she had a relationship, although after the visits to the Kaiserkeller their relationship became purely platonic. Kirchherr started dating Sutcliffe, although she always remained a close friend of Voormann.

Kirchherr later supplied Sutcliffe and the other Beatles with Preludin, which, when taken with beer, made them feel euphoric and helped to keep them awake until the early hours of the morning. The Beatles had taken Preludin before, but it was only possible at the time to obtain Preludin with a doctor's prescription note. Kirchherr's mother procured them from a local chemist, who supplied them without asking questions. After meeting Kirchherr, Lennon filled his letters to Cynthia Powell (his girlfriend at the time) with "Astrid said this, Astrid did that", which made Powell jealous, until she read that Sutcliffe was in a relationship with Kirchherr. When Powell visited Hamburg with Dot Rhone (McCartney's girlfriend at the time) in April 1961, they stayed at Kirchherr's house. In August 1963, Kirchherr met Lennon and Cynthia in Paris while they were both there for a belated honeymoon, as Kirchherr was there with a girlfriend for a few days' holiday. The four of them went from wine bar to wine bar and finally ended up back at Kirchherr's lodgings, where all four fell asleep on Kirchherr's single bed.

The Beatles met Kirchherr again in Hamburg in 1966 when they were touring Germany, and Kirchherr gave Lennon the letters he had written to Sutcliffe in 1961 and 1962. Lennon said it was "the best present I've had in years". All of the Beatles wrote many letters to Kirchherr: "I only have a couple from George [Harrison], which I'll never show anyone, but he wrote so many. So did the others. I probably threw them away. You do that when you're young – you don't think of the future." Harrison later asked Kirchherr to arrange the cover of his Wonderwall Music album in 1968.

=== The Beatles haircut and clothes ===
Kirchherr is credited with inventing the Beatles' moptop haircut although she disagreed, saying: "All that rubbish people said, that I created their hairstyle, that's rubbish! Lots of German boys had that hairstyle. Stuart [Sutcliffe] had it for a long while and the others copied it. I suppose the most important thing I contributed to them was friendship." In 1995, Kirchherr told BBC Radio Merseyside: "All my friends in art school used to run around with this sort of what you call Beatles haircut. And my boyfriend then, Klaus Voormann, had this hairstyle, and Stuart liked it very very much. He was the first one who really got the nerve to get the Brylcreem out of his hair and asking me to cut his hair for him. Pete [Best] has really curly hair and it wouldn't work." Kirchherr says that after she cut Sutcliffe's hair, Harrison asked her to do the same when she was visiting Liverpool, and Lennon and McCartney had their hair cut in the same style while they were in Paris, by Kirchherr's friend, Vollmer, who was living there at the time as an assistant to photographer William Klein.

After moving into the Kirchherr family's house, Sutcliffe used to borrow her clothes, as he was the same height as Kirchherr. He wore her leather pants and jackets, collarless jackets, oversized shirts, and long scarves. He also borrowed a corduroy suit with no lapels that he wore on stage, which prompted Lennon to sarcastically ask if his mother had lent him the suit.

== Stuart Sutcliffe ==
Sutcliffe wrote to friends that he was infatuated with Kirchherr, and asked her friends which colours, films, books and painters she liked, and whom she fancied. Best later commented that the beginning of their relationship was, "like one of those fairy stories". Kirchherr says that she immediately fell in love with Sutcliffe, and referred to him as "the love of my life". Kirchherr and Sutcliffe got engaged in November 1960, and exchanged rings, as is the German custom. Sutcliffe later wrote to his parents that he was engaged to Kirchherr, which they were shocked to learn, as they thought he would give up his career as an artist, although he told Kirchherr that he would like to be an art teacher in London or Germany in the future.

Kirchherr and Sutcliffe went to Liverpool in the summer of 1961, as Kirchherr wanted to meet Sutcliffe's family (and to see Liverpool) before their marriage. Everybody was expecting a strange beatnik artist from Hamburg, but Kirchherr turned up at the Sutcliffes' house at 37 Aigburth Drive, Liverpool, bearing a single long-stemmed orchid in her hand as a present, and dressed in a round-necked cashmere sweater and tailored skirt.

In February 1962, Sutcliffe collapsed in the middle of an art class in Hamburg. He was suffering from intense headaches, and Kirchherr's mother had German doctors perform checks on him, although they were unable to determine the cause of his headaches. While living at the Kirchherrs' house in Hamburg, his condition deteriorated. On 10 April 1962, Kirchherr received a phone call from her mother, who informed her that Sutcliffe had collapsed again, was not feeling well and an ambulance had been called for. Kirchherr rushed home and rode with Sutcliffe in the ambulance, but he died in her arms before it reached the hospital.

Three days later Kirchherr met Lennon, McCartney and Best at the Hamburg airport (they were returning to Hamburg to perform) and told them Sutcliffe had died of a brain haemorrhage. Harrison and manager Brian Epstein arrived on another plane sometime later with Sutcliffe's mother, who had been informed by telegram. Harrison and Lennon were helpful towards the distraught Kirchherr, with Lennon telling her one-day that she definitely had to decide if she wanted to "live or die, there is no other question."

== Freelance photographer ==
In 1964, Kirchherr became a freelance photographer, and with her colleague Max Scheler she took "behind the scenes" photographs of the Beatles during the filming of A Hard Day's Night, as an assignment for the German Stern magazine. Epstein had forbidden any publicity photographs to be taken without his permission, but Kirchherr phoned Harrison, who said he would arrange it, but added, "Only if they pay you."

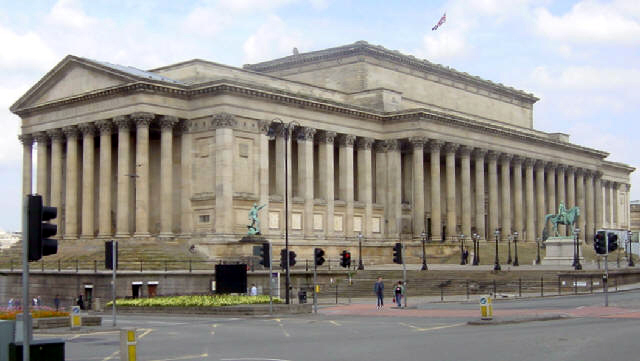
St. George's Hall, Liverpool. Kirchherr took photographs of Liverpool groups as they stood on the front steps.

Stern phoned Bill Harry at his Mersey Beat newspaper and asked if he could arrange a photograph of all the groups in Liverpool, so Harry suggested Kirchherr be the photographer, although Kirchherr later said she placed an advertisement in the Liverpool Echo newspaper. Kirchherr and Scheler said that any group who wanted their photograph taken in front of St. George's Hall would be paid per musician, but over 200 groups turned up on the day, which meant Kirchherr and Scheler soon ran out of money. Kirchherr didn't publish the photographs until 1995, in a book called Liverpool Days, which is a limited-edition collection of black-and-white photographs. In 1999, a companion book called Hamburg Days was published (a two-volume limited edition), containing a set of photographs by Kirchherr and "memory drawings" by Voormann. The drawings are recollections of places and situations that Voormann clearly remembers, but Kirchherr had never photographed, or had lost the photographs.

Kirchherr described how difficult it was to be accepted as a female photographer in the 1960s: "Every magazine and newspaper wanted me to photograph the Beatles again. Or they wanted my old stuff, even if it was out of focus, whether they were nice or not. They wouldn't look at my other work. It was very hard for a girl photographer in the 60s to be accepted. In the end I gave up. I've hardly taken a photo since 1967." Kirchherr was quoted as saying that When We Was Fab (Genesis Publications 2007), would be her last book of photographs: "I have decided it is time to create one book in which I am totally involved so that it contains the pictures I like most, printed the way I would print them, even down to the text and design.... This book is me and that is why it will be the last one. The very last one."

Kirchherr expressed respect for other photographers, such as Annie Leibovitz (because of the humour in her work), Irving Penn, Richard Avedon, Jim Rakete and Reinhart Wolf, and French film-makers François Truffaut, and Jean Cocteau. Kirchherr said that her favourite photos are the ones she took of Sutcliffe by the Baltic sea, and of Lennon and Harrison in her attic room at 45a Eimsbütteler Strasse. She expressed reservations about digital photography, saying that a photographer should concentrate on the art of photography and not on the technical results, although admitting that she knew nothing about computers and was "afraid of the internet".

Kirchherr admitted she was not good at business because of insufficient organisation, and had never really looked after the negatives of her photographs to prove ownership. Her business partner Ulf Krüger—a songwriter and record producer—successfully found many of Astrid's negatives and photographs and had them copyrighted, although he believes that Kirchherr lost much over the years because of people using her photographs without permission. In July 2001, Kirchherr visited Liverpool to open an exhibition of her work at the Mathew Street art gallery, which is close to the former site of The Cavern Club. She appeared as a guest at the city's Beatles Week Festival during the August Bank Holiday. Kirchherr's work has been exhibited internationally in places, such as Hamburg, Bremen, London, Liverpool, New York City, Washington D.C., Tokyo, Vienna, and at the Rock 'n' Roll Hall of Fame.

== Later life ==
In 1967, Kirchherr married English drummer Gibson Kemp (born Gibson Stewart Kemp, August 1945, Liverpool, Lancashire), who had replaced Ringo Starr in Rory Storm and the Hurricanes. The marriage ended in divorce after seven years. She then worked as a barmaid, as an interior designer, and then for a music publishing firm, getting married for a second time to a German businessman. Kirchherr worked as an advisor in 1994 on the film Backbeat, which portrayed Kirchherr, Sutcliffe and the Beatles during their early days in Hamburg. She was impressed with Stephen Dorff (who played Sutcliffe in the film), commenting that he was the right age (19 years old at the time), and his gestures, the way he smoked, and talked were so like Sutcliffe's that she had goose pimples. Kirchherr was portrayed in the film by Sheryl Lee.

Starting in the mid-1990s, Kirchherr and business partner Krüger operated the K&K photography shop in Hamburg, offering custom vintage prints, books and artwork for sale. K&K periodically helped arrange Beatles' conventions and other Beatles' events in the Hamburg area. She commented in 1995: "My [second] marriage ended in 1985... I regretted I had no children. I just couldn't see me have [sic] any. But now I am pleased when I see the situation the world is in. I live alone and am very happy."

Kirchherr died on 12 May 2020 in Hamburg, following "a short, serious illness", a week prior to her 82nd birthday. News of her death was first announced by Beatles historian Mark Lewisohn via Twitter. He praised her involvement with the band as "immeasurable", and credited her as an "intelligent, inspirational, innovative, daring, artistic, awake, aware, beautiful, smart, loving and uplifting friend to many".

== See also ==
- List of German women artists
