= British rock and roll =

British genre of popular music

- Stylistic origins: Rock and roll; skiffle
- Cultural origins: Late 1950s, United Kingdom
- Typical instruments: Electric guitar; string bass or later bass guitar; drums; piano; saxophone
- Derivative forms: Beat music; blues rock

British rock and roll, or typeset as British rock 'n' roll, is a style of popular music based on American rock and roll, which emerged in the late 1950s and was popular until the arrival of beat music in 1962. It was important in establishing British youth and popular music culture and was a key factor in subsequent developments that led to the British Invasion of the mid-1960s. Since the 1960s, some stars of the genre, most notably Cliff Richard, have managed to sustain successful careers and there have been periodic revivals of this form of music.

== Origins ==
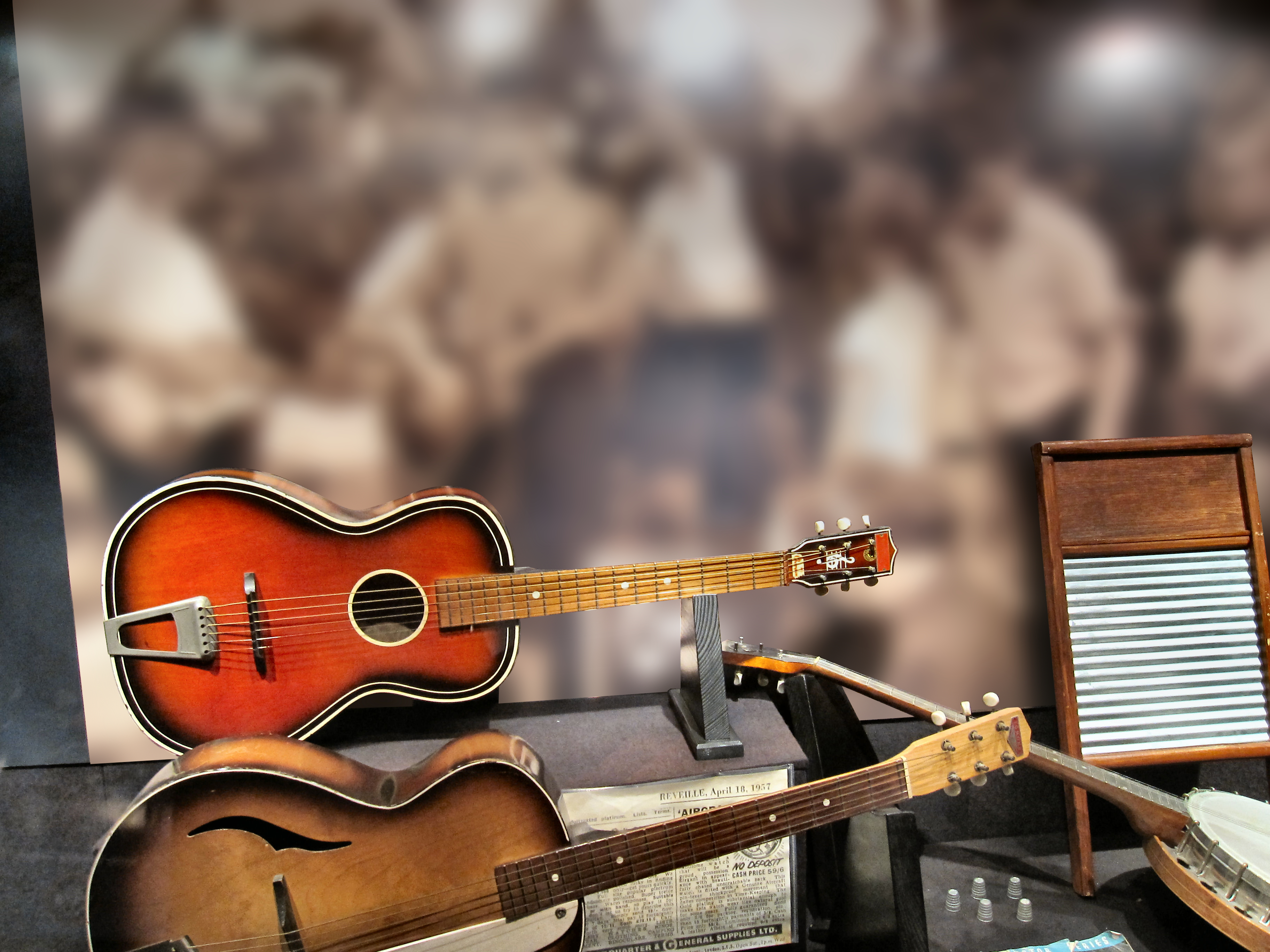
The instruments of the skiffle group the Quarrymen, who would eventually become the Beatles

In the 1950s, Britain was well placed to receive American rock and roll music and culture. It shared a common language, had been exposed to American culture through the stationing of American troops in the country, and, although not enjoying the same economic prosperity as the US, had many similar social developments, not least of which was the emergence of distinct youth leisure activities and sub-cultures. This was most evident in the rise of the Teddy Boys among working-class youths in London from about 1953, who adopted a version of the Edwardian styles of their grandfathers' generation.

British audiences were accustomed to American popular music and British musicians had already been influenced by American musical styles, particularly in trad jazz, which also exposed some to the precursors of rock and roll, including boogie-woogie and the blues. From this emerged the skiffle craze in 1955, led by Lonnie Donegan, whose version of "Rock Island Line" reached the Top 10 in the UK Singles Chart. Skiffle produced an Anglicised and largely amateur form of American folk song, chiefly notable for inspiring many individuals to take up music. These included many of the subsequent generation of rock and roll, folk, R&B and beat performers, among them John Lennon and Paul McCartney, who first performed together in the Quarrymen skiffle group in 1957 (Joined the following year by George Harrison).

At the same time, British audiences were beginning to encounter American rock and roll. For many, this was initially through American films, including Blackboard Jungle (1955) and Rock Around the Clock (1955). Both films contained the Bill Haley & His Comets hit "Rock Around the Clock" and helped it to top the UK chart in 1955 and again in 1956. It also set off a moral panic as young cinema goers ripped up seats to dance, which helped identify rock and roll with delinquency. This led to it being almost banned by TV and radio stations, making it something of an underground youth movement, which was widely adopted by the Teddy Boy sub-culture. In the 1950s, Radio in the UK was almost exclusively in the hands of the BBC. Popular music was only played on the Light Programme, and the playing of records was heavily restricted by "needle time" arrangements. Nevertheless, American rock and roll acts became a major force in the UK chart. Elvis Presley reached number 2 in the UK chart with "Heartbreak Hotel" in 1956 and had nine more singles in the Top 30 that year. His first number 1 was "All Shook Up" in 1957 and there would be more chart-toppers for him and for Buddy Holly and the Crickets and Jerry Lee Lewis in the next two years.

== Emergence and development ==
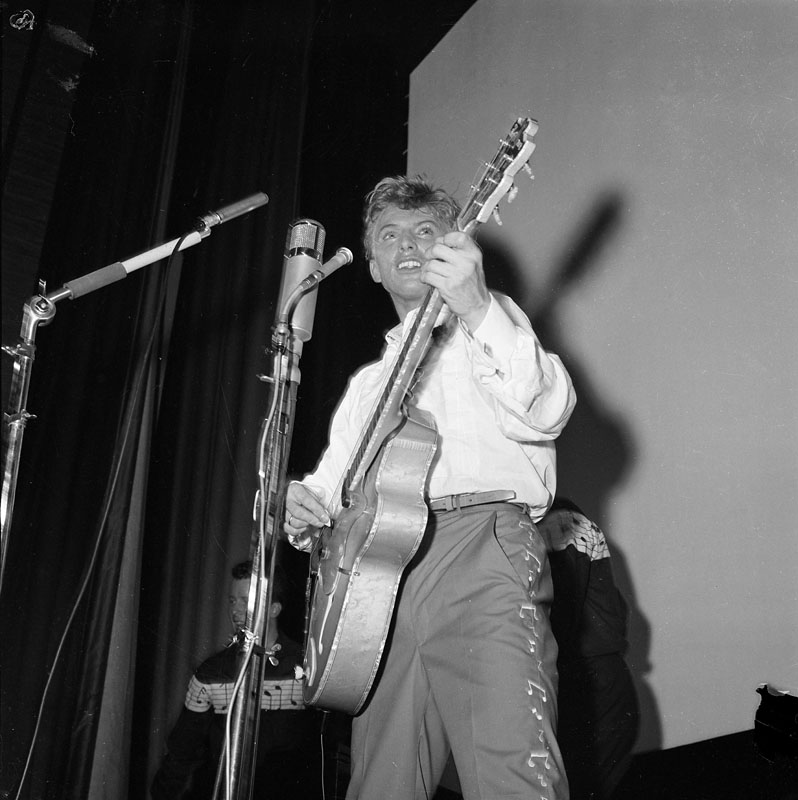
Tommy Steele, one of the first British rock and rollers, performing in Stockholm in 1957

The initial response of the British music industry was to attempt to produce exact copies of American records. These were often recorded with session musicians and, even if note perfect, lacked the energy and spontaneity that characterised American rock and roll. They were often fronted by teen idols co-opted in an attempt to break into the suddenly emerging youth market. More grassroots British rock and rollers soon began to appear, many of them out of the declining skiffle craze, including Wee Willie Harris (usually credited as the first) and Tommy Steele, who proved the most successful of this first wave, and one of the first to be tagged as "the British Elvis". He reached the Top 20 with "Rock with the Caveman" and number 1 with "Singing the Blues" in 1956. Another response was to treat rock and roll as a joke – "Bloodnok's Rock and Roll Call", recorded by The Goons, reached number 3 in the chart in late 1956.

The bland, jokey, or wholly imitative style of much British rock and roll in this period meant that the American product remained dominant. However, this process was important in the orientation of the British record industry towards the youth market and group based music in general. In 1958, Britain produced its first "authentic" rock and roll song and star, when Cliff Richard and The Drifters (Not the US vocal group) reached number 2 in the chart with "Move It", which managed to combine a bluesy rock and roll riff with respectable lyrics and attitude.

The success of "Move It" was partly due to an appearance on Independent Television's Oh Boy! (1958–9). This followed the BBC's tentative first attempt at youth music programming, Six-Five Special (1957–58), with a much more music-orientated show that did much to promote the careers of British rock and rollers like Marty Wilde, Johnny Gentle, Vince Eager, Adam Faith and Duffy Power, all managed by Larry Parnes who also gave them their stage names.

These and other British acts had a series of hits in the late 1950s. Cliff Richard, and as instrumental artists his new backing band The Shadows, were the most successful home grown rock and roll based acts of the era. The Shadows, and particularly guitarist Hank Marvin, were highly influential on a subsequent generation of musicians, helping to cement the line-up of drums, bass, rhythm and lead guitars for British bands. However, in retrospect their work tends to be seen as a bland imitation of American rock and roll. Notably, Cliff Richard rapidly dropped much of his sub-Elvis, rock and roll image for a softer mainstream style, as can be seen in his first number 1, "Living Doll" and a subsequent series of ballads that owed little to rock and roll.

Amid the limited vitality of late 1950s and early 1960s British rock and roll, there were some more dynamic acts. These included Billy Fury, whose rockabilly-style compositions, aided by the guitar of Joe Brown, on his "masterpiece" 1960 LP Sound of Fury are considered some of the best work of the era. Tony Sheridan, Vince Taylor and Screaming Lord Sutch and the Savages also produced some work that could be compared with American rock and roll. Other singers who issued records of note included Terry Dene, "a fine rock'n'roll vocalist"; Johnny Brandon, who toured the US in 1956 billed as "the King of Rock & Roll"; Dickie Pride, Roy Young, and Helen Shapiro. The only act to create what has been described as "a pre-Beatle rock classic", were Johnny Kidd & the Pirates, whose song "Shakin' All Over" managed to become a rock and roll standard.

Several of the most lasting and innovative British records of the period were produced by Joe Meek. These included "Johnny Remember Me" by John Leyton, a UK number one record in 1961, and "Telstar" by the Tornados in 1962, which was number one in the UK and became the first record by a British group to reach number one in the US Hot 100.

== Decline and revivals ==
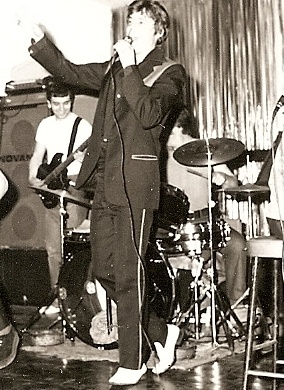
Rock and roll revivalist Shakin Stevens performing in 1976

British rock and roll declined sharply in the face of the new beat music after 1962. While some of the most successful acts, most notably Cliff Richard, were able to hang on to positions in the chart, British rock and roll virtually disappeared from the chart, as beat and then R&B based groups began to dominate. Many British rock and rollers continued their careers, and occasional bands specialised in the form, but mainstream success for the genre was rare.

There have been periodic revivals of British rock and roll, with a successful revival starting in the mid-1970s, that saw highly nostalgic pop acts like Showaddywaddy, Mud and Alvin Stardust (who, as Shane Fenton, had enjoyed chart success in the early 1960s), enjoy a number of Top Ten hits in the UK charts. These acts were joined in the charts by other retro acts in the late 1970s, including Darts and Matchbox. The revival continued in the 1980s, mainly due to the popularity of Shakin' Stevens, who became the UK's "most successful singles chart act of the 1980s", and appeared frequently on children's television shows such as The Basil Brush Show and Razzmatazz. In 1981, British rockabilly band The Jets also had two hit singles in the UK charts. However, since then a wider revival has been elusive.

== Influence ==
In general, early British rock and roll was a second-class product and made little impact on the American market, where British acts before 1963 were almost unknown. In Britain too their significance was limited. British rhythm and blues bands like the Rolling Stones and the Yardbirds deliberately turned away from rock and roll towards its sources in America, and even the subsequent generation of beat bands that owed much more to rock and roll, frequently covered songs by American artists like Chuck Berry, but rarely used material from British acts. Early British rock and roll was undoubtedly an inspiration and influence on the instrumentation and shape of the beat music that spearheaded the British Invasion, but it had to be changed significantly into something new and vital in order to have any impact outside of its own borders.

== See also ==
- List of British rock and roll musicians
- List of British rock and roll music groups
