= Dickie Pride =

English singer (1941-1969)

- Also known as: The Sheik of Shake
- Born: Richard Charles Kneller; 21 October 1941; Thornton Heath, Croydon, England
- Died: 26 March 1969 (aged 27) Thornton Heath, Croydon, England
- Genres: Rock and roll; pop; jazz; traditional pop
- Occupation: Singer
- Years active: 1958–1969
- Labels: Columbia; Piccadilly

Dickie Pride (born Richard Charles Kneller; 21 October 1941 – 26 March 1969) was an English singer. He was one of Larry Parnes's stable of Rock and roll stars, although he did not achieve the same successful career as some of his contemporaries.

== Early life ==
Pride was born on 21 October 1941, at 74 Parchmore Road, Thornton Heath, Surrey, now in Croydon. He attended John Newnham Secondary School in Addington before visiting the Royal School of Church Music in Croydon, where a career as an opera singer was suggested. Later on, Pride was a member of a skiffle group, the Semi-Tones. When Pride was 15 years old, his father died. He took on several menial jobs to help support the family, including working in a stonemason's yard that specialised in making gravestones. Eventually Pride was fired for being too cheerful and singing at work.

== Career ==
=== Discovery and early start ===
I dropped into a pub in Tooting and there was this incredible singer. I'd no idea who he was, but I was so impressed I talked to Larry Parnes about him. We went to see him the next week and took Lionel Bart with us. We were all so impressed that Larry decided to sign him on the spot.

— Russ Conway

In late 1958, Russ Conway heard him performing at the Castle Public House in Tooting, South London. Conway recommended him to Larry Parnes, who immediately signed him. Parnes gave him the stage name 'Dickie Pride'. At 16, he gave his first concert as Dickie Pride at the Gaumont State Cinema in Kilburn, which was then the biggest cinema in the United Kingdom. The music magazine Record Mirror stated that "he ripped it up from the start" and that the theatre shook so much during his performance that he should be known "The sheik of shake". Pride was signed to Columbia Records, by Norrie Paramor.

=== Successful performances and poor record sales ===
If there was anyone in the audience heckling he'd jump off the stage and go and thump them. He was also the man who taught me to sing harmony, when I'd never even heard of it. He'd get three or four of us together on the back of the coach singing and that's how I learnt to do it. He was tremendously talented and his death was a tragedy.

— Georgie Fame

This was followed by tours, television and, in March 1959, his debut single, "Slippin' and Slidin'" (a cover of a song made famous by Little Richard). Pride made eight appearances on the first teenage all-music TV show, Oh Boy! He also performed in 'The Big Beat Show' at Southend with Marty Wilde, Billy Fury, Terry Dene, Johnny Gentle, Duffy Power and Sally Kelly. However, the commercial performance of most of Pride's recordings was far below expectations. The only Pride single that ever made it into the Top 40 in the UK Singles Chart, "Primrose Lane", appeared in October 1959 for only one week at No. 28.

Television producer Jack Good had seen Pride sing in Southend. The first edition of Good's rock and roll TV show Wham!, shown on ABC Weekend TV in April 1960, included Pride. Guitarist Albert Lee made his first professional stage appearance as an accompanist for Pride. Despite Pride being guaranteed 60 pounds a week by the fourth year, Parnes reneged on almost all the contracts, which were so tightly drawn that Parnes could do anything he wanted.

Pride was successful during live performances, but had difficulty transferring this success to his recordings. In 1961, Columbia attempted to reposition Pride as an all round entertainer, by recording an album of 'Tin Pan Alley' standards with Eric Jupp and his Orchestra, called Pride Without Prejudice. Pride always had an interest in jazz and traditional pop, so he was keen to finally do an album of his own. But the record sold poorly, and Pride was later dropped by Parnes and Columbia. Pride remained close friends with Billy Fury and Duffy Power.

=== Struggle for fame ===
With his records no longer selling, Pride took a job as a van driver to help pay the bills for a short time. He later formed two other groups. The first was The Guv'ners in 1963, with Nelson Keane and Bobby Shafto. They were signed to Piccadilly Records, a subsidiary of Pye Records, and released a single, "Let's Make a Habit of This", with "The Kissing Had to Stop" as a B-side. It failed to chart, and the band split up after Shafto was injured in a car accident in June 1963. The second was The Sidewinders in 1965. They had minor success, although it was brief – from playing at the Cavern Club in Liverpool, to supporting a young Stevie Wonder during his 1966 UK tour.

== Personal life ==
In his early years, Pride was in a relationship with a local girl named Mandy Atkinson. Their romance lasted until Pride was signed to Larry Parnes. In 1959, Pride's misbehaviour got him in trouble with the law for stealing a car, for which he was put on probation. In addition to having mental health problems, Pride was under the influence of drugs, including heroin. On 23 March 1962, Pride married Patricia Arkell. Three years later on 11 May 1965, she gave birth to their son Richard Ludt, at the Weir Maternity Hospital in Central London. Due to Pride's musical frustrations and their experiments with drugs, the marriage fell apart. Shortly after they divorced, Patricia had custody of their son. She then remarried and emigrated to the United States.

Richard committed suicide on 10 October 2011, aged 46. Patricia died from complications of Alzheimer's disease at the age of 72, on 11 April 2014.

Pride moved back home to live with his mother and sister, Anne. His heroin addiction got worse over time, from visiting the various jazz clubs in London. In 1967, he was submitted to a psychiatric clinic, where a lobotomy was performed. They inserted radioactive particles, into the frontal lobe of his brain. For a year Pride had control over his habit and his appearance improved, but in the end he fell back on drugs.

== Death ==
On 26 March 1969, Pride's sister found him dead in his bed. He died at the age of 27, from an accidental overdose of sleeping pills. His death received little, or no publicity. He became part of the 27 Club, among many notable people who died at the same age. Fellow Parnes artists such as Billy Fury, Joe Brown and Georgie Fame stated that Pride had been the most talented singer on Parnes' roster.

== Tributes ==
Pride was portrayed by Andy Serkis in a 1994 BBC Radio 4 play about Billy Fury titled, The Sound of Fury, written by Mike Walker.

In 1999, Charles Langley wrote the stage play, Pride With Prejudice, about Pride's tragic life.

On 16 July 2002, a BBC biography series called Jukebox Heroes narrated by Mark Lamarr aired an episode on Pride's life and career.

== Discography ==
=== Studio albums ===
- Pride Without Prejudice - Columbia SCX 3369 - 1961

=== Compilation albums ===
- The Sheik of Shake - See for Miles Records - 1992
- Slippin 'N' Sliding with Dickie Pride - Rigsby Records RIGCD-7752
- The Complete Dickie Pride - Peaksoft PEA009 - 2010
- The Sheik of Shake: Expanded Edition - Jasmine Records JASCD1178 - 2023

Compilations featuring Pride

- Great British Rock & Roll: As Good As It Gets - Disky Communications Europe BV 300 - 2001

=== Singles ===
- "Slippin' And Slidin'" / "Don't Make Me Love You" - Columbia DB 4283 - 1959
- "Frantic" / "Primrose Lane" - Columbia DB 4340 - 1959 - UK No. 28
- "Fabulous Cure" / "Midnight Oil" - Columbia DB 4296 - 1959
- "Betty Betty (Go Steady With Me)" / "No John" - Columbia DB 4403 - 1960
- "Bye Bye Blackbird" / "You're Singin' Our Love Song To Somebody Else" - Columbia - DB 4451 - 1960

=== EP ===
- "The Sheik Of Shake" - Columbia - SEG 7937 - 1959
