= The Beat Ballad Show Tour =

1960 concert tour by Johnny Gentle and the Beatles

- Tour by Johnny Gentle and the Beatles
- Poster to the first concerts in Alloa
- Location: Scotland
- Start date: May 20, 1960
- End date: May 28, 1960
- No. of shows: 7

The Beat Ballad Show Tour was a 1960 tour of Scotland by singer Johnny Gentle, backed by the Beatles (billed as Johnny Gentle and His Group). It was the first concert tour by the Beatles.

== Background ==
On 10 May, the Beatles competed with other local Liverpool bands in an audition for talent manager Larry Parnes for a chance to back singer Billy Fury on a summer tour called "Idols on Parade". There was also an opportunity for the second-best band to back singers Duffy Power and Johnny Gentle in a tour of Scotland from 20–28 May 1960. However, Beatles drummer Tommy Moore arrived late and Johnny Hutch was asked to sit in with the band.

The Beatles were turned down for both spots, although Parnes contacted Beatles manager Allan Williams to arrange for them to back Gentle on a Scottish tour beginning on 20 May; the Beatles were the only group Williams could book at such short notice.

== The Tour ==
For the tour, the Beatles adopted stage names—John Lennon became known as "Johnny Lennon", Paul McCartney was "Paul Ramon", George Harrison was "Carl Harrison", Stuart Sutcliffe was "Stuart de Staël", and Tommy Moore was "Thomas Moore". The band was very under-rehearsed, barely knowing the songs they were to perform with Gentle. Gentle and the Beatles were friendly with each other on the tour, and Lennon contributed to a song Gentle was writing, "I've Just Fallen for Someone".

The exact songs played on the tour are unknown. It is known that the Beatles performed by themselves before Gentle came on the stage. Harrison would remember performing "Teddy Bear" and "Wear My Ring Around Your Neck" by Elvis Presley. Other sources report that they played "It Doesn't Matter Anymore" and "Raining in My Heart" by Buddy Holly, "I Need Your Love Tonight" by Elvis Presley, "Poor Little Fool" by Ricky Nelson, "(I Don't Know Why) But I Do" by Clarence "Frogman" Henry, "C'mon Everybody" by Eddie Cochran, and "He'll Have to Go" by Jim Reeves.

== Tour dates ==
Date	City	Country	Venue
20 May 1960	Alloa	Scotland	Alloa Town Hall
21 May 1960	Inverness	Scotland	Northern Meeting Rooms
23 May 1960	Fraserburgh	Scotland	Dalrymple Hall
25 May 1960	Keith	Scotland	St Thomas' Hall
26 May 1960	Forres	Scotland	Forres Town Hall
27 May 1960	Nairn	Scotland	Regal Ballroom
28 May 1960	Peterhead	Scotland	Rescue Hall

== Tour band ==
- Johnny Gentle – vocals
- Johnny Lennon – rhythm guitar, vocals
- Paul Ramon – rhythm guitar
- Carl Harrison – lead guitar
- Stuart de Staël – bass guitar
- Thomas Moore – drums

== See also ==
- List of the Beatles' live performances

== Sources ==
- Lewisohn, Mark (2013). The Beatles: All These Years, Vol. 1: Tune In. Crown Archetype. ISBN 978-1-4000-8305-3.
