= Forres Town Hall =

Municipal building in Forres, Scotland

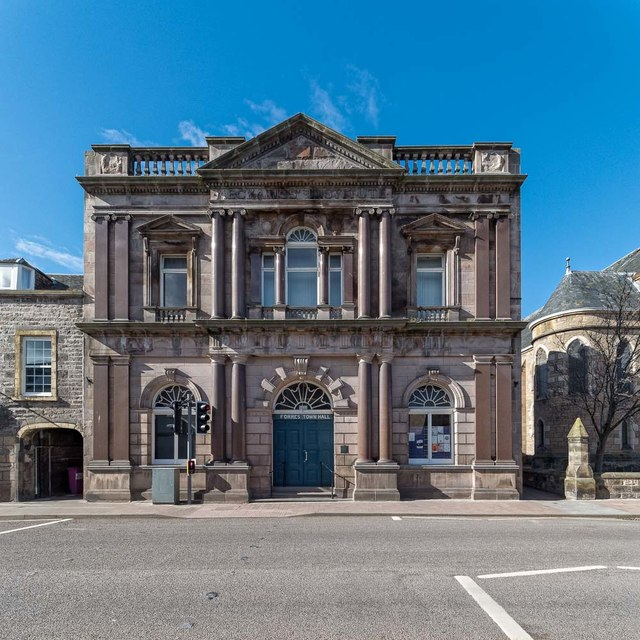
- Forres Town Hall

- Shown in Moray
- 57.6110°N 3.6121°W
- Location: High Street, Forres

History
- Built: 1829

Site notes
- Architect: Archibald Simpson
- Architectural style: Neoclassical style

Listed Building – Category B
- Official name: Town Hall, High Street, Forres
- Designated: 30 March 1983
- Reference no.: LB31643

Forres Town Hall is a municipal structure in the High Street, Forres, Moray, Scotland. The structure, which was the meeting place of Forres Burgh Council, is a Category B listed building.

== History ==
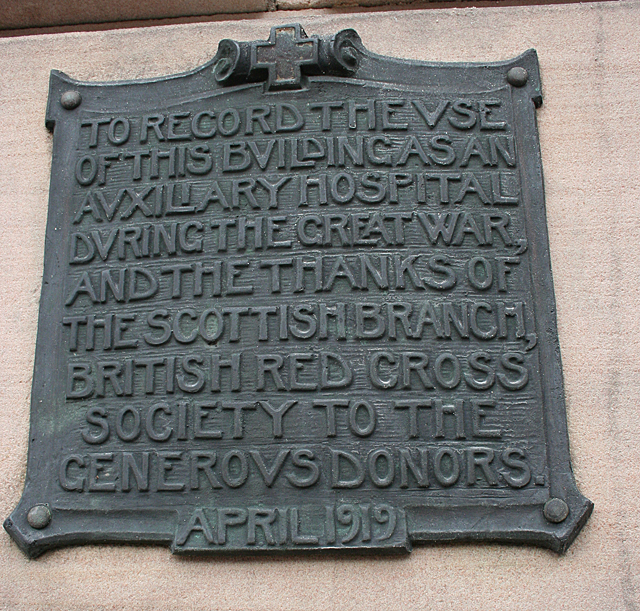
Plaque on the town hall commemorating its use as a hospital in the First World War

The first municipal building in the town was the Forres Tolbooth in the High Street which was completed in the mid-16th century. It was primarily used as a prison and was rebuilt to a design by William Robertson in the Scottish baronial style in 1839.

Meanwhile, on the opposite side of the High Street, a masonic hall was erected in around 1790. The hall was then re-modelled by Archibald Simpson in the neoclassical style in 1829 but, after the masonic lodge which had commissioned it got into financial difficulties in the mid-19th century, it was acquired by the local mechanics institute in 1855. The façade of the building was then further enhanced to a design by John Forrest in 1901. The design involved a symmetrical main frontage with three bays facing onto the High Street; the central bay, which slightly projected forward, featured a doorway with a fanlight on the ground floor flanked by pairs of Doric order columns supporting an entablature with triglyphs. There was Venetian window on the first floor flanked by pairs of Ionic order columns supporting an entablature inscribed with the words "Mechanics' Institute". The outer bays were fenestrated with round headed windows on the ground floor and by pedimented sash windows on the first floor. The outer bays were also decorated, on the outer corners, by pairs of Doric order pilasters on the ground floor and by pairs of Ionic order pilasters on the first floor. At roof level, there was a modillioned cornice, a balustrade and a central modillioned pediment. Internally, the principal room was the main assembly hall.

The building was used as a British Red Cross hospital for wounded service personnel during the First World War and was then acquired by the burgh council for use as a town hall before being requisitioned for military use for the duration of the Second World War. After the war the building reverted to municipal use but also continued to be used as an events venue: the rock band, the Silver Beatles, performed at the town hall during a tour of Scotland as the backing group for the pop singer Johnny Gentle in May 1960. The building ceased to be local seat of government when the enlarged Moray District Council was formed in 1975. The local masonic lodge, Lodge St Lawrence, continued to use the building as its hall until 1984.

After Moray Council decided to close the building in 2017, the Forres Area Community Trust took over management of the building in July 2018 and, with financial support from the Scottish Land Fund, acquired ownership of it in March 2021.

== See also ==
- List of listed buildings in Forres, Moray
