= Alloa Town Hall =

Municipal Building in Alloa, Scotland

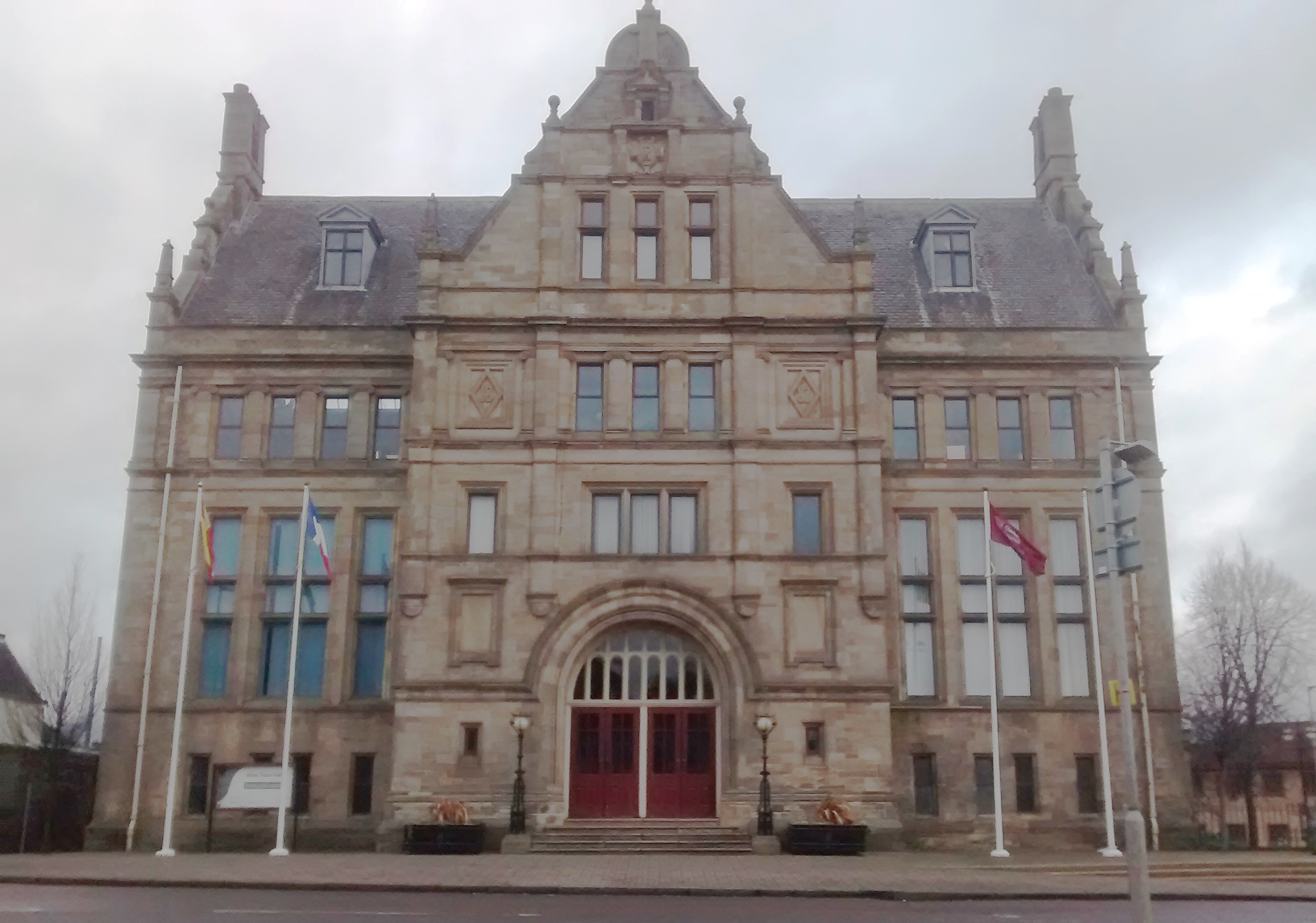
- Alloa Town Hall

- Shown in Clackmannanshire
- 56.1165°N 3.7953°W
- Location: Marshill, Alloa

History
- Built: 1889

Site notes
- Architect: Alfred Waterhouse
- Architectural style: Renaissance style

Listed Building – Category C(S)
- Official name: Town Hall, Marshill
- Designated: 12 June 1972
- Reference no.: LB20976

Alloa Town Hall is a municipal building in Marshill, Alloa, Scotland. The structure, which was the meeting place of Alloa Burgh Council, is a Category C listed building.

== History ==
Until the late 19th century Alloa lacked a public hall capable of accommodating a large number of people, so when a director of John Paton Son and Co., John Thomson Paton, offered to pay for a town hall as a gift to the town, burgh leaders agreed to accept the offer: the site they selected was occupied by some large private houses.

The new building was designed by Alfred Waterhouse in the Renaissance style, built by G. & R. Cousin in ashlar stone at a cost of £18,008 and completed in 1889. The design involved a symmetrical main frontage with five bays facing onto Marshill; the central section of three bays, which projected forward, featured a round headed doorway on the ground floor, mullioned windows on the first floor, mullioned windows flanked by Ionic order pilasters on the second floor and mullioned windows on the third floor with a gable above. There was a hall block behind the front block with an octagonal chimney at the north end. Internally, the front block contained the council chamber on the first floor and an art school on the upper floors, while the hall block contained an assembly hall which accommodated a public library as well as an organ designed and made by Forster and Andrews.

The building continued to serve as the headquarters of Alloa Burgh Council throughout the first half of the 20th century but ceased to be the local seat of government when the council moved to Greenfield House at Mar Place in 1952. The building continued to be used as an events venue and the rock band, the Silver Beetles, performed at the town hall during a tour of Scotland as the backing group for the pop singer Johnny Gentle in May 1960. However, the organ was removed from the building and destroyed in January 1970. Queen Elizabeth II met civic officials at the town hall during a visit to the town to re-open the refurbished Alloa Tower in July 1997. A major programme of refurbishment works at the town hall, including redecoration and the upgrading of the heating system, was completed in summer 2011. A plaque to commemorate the visit of the Silver Beetles was installed on the front of the building and unveiled in March 2022.

== See also ==
- List of listed buildings in Alloa, Clackmannanshire
