= Brian Cassar =

British musician (1936–2022)

- Also known as: Cass; Casey Jones; Casey Valence
- Born: 21 March 1936; Newcastle upon Tyne, England
- Origin: Liverpool, England
- Died: 25 December 2022 (aged 86) Germany
- Genres: Beat; rock and roll
- Occupation: Singer
- Years active: 1959–1970s Intermittently later
- Formerly of: Cass and the Cassanovas; Casey Jones and the Engineers; Casey Jones and the Governors

Brian Cassar (21 March 1936 – 25 December 2022) was a British singer and guitarist known as Casey Jones. He led the first notable beat group in Liverpool, Cass and the Cassanovas, who were early rivals of The Beatles in the city. He later led another group, Casey Jones and the Engineers, which was one of Eric Clapton's first bands, and then, as leader of Casey Jones and the Governors, became successful in Germany, where he became based for much of his life. His surname is sometimes misspelled as Casser.

== Life and career ==
=== Early life ===
Cassar was born in Newcastle upon Tyne, and raised in Liverpool. In the 1950s, he worked in the Merchant Navy.

=== Cass & the Cassanovas ===
As a singer and rhythm guitarist, Cassar formed a trio, Cass & the Cassanovas, in May 1959, with singer and guitarist Adrian Barber (born 13 November 1938, Ilkley, Yorkshire), and drummer and singer Brian J. Hudson (born Brian James Hudson, 21 April 1938, Cleveland, Yorkshire). After a few months, Hudson left and was replaced by Johnny Hutchinson (born 18 July 1940, Malta), known as Johnny Hutch. In need of a bass guitarist, Hutchinson then brought in Johnny Gustafson (born 8 August 1942, Liverpool) in December 1959. At that time Gustafson did not have a proper bass guitar so Barber converted an acoustic for him. The group became popular playing a wide range of music, from Latin American music to rock and roll, in dance halls in the Liverpool area. Cassar also started his own music club in Liverpool, the Casanova Club, whose guest groups included one known at the time as the "Silver Beetles"; according to some reports, Cassar had suggested that they change their name from the earlier spelling of "Beatals" which Cassar found "ridiculous". In May 1960 Cass & the Cassanovas took part in auditions in front of leading manager Larry Parnes who was looking for backing bands for his stable of pop singers. The group secured a place as backing group for singer Duffy Power and toured with him. By this time, Cassar had begun using the stage names of "Casey Jones" and "Casey Valence".

=== Casey Jones ===
In December 1960, Gustafson, Hutchinson and Barber left the band, and formed themselves into a new trio, The Big Three. Cassar moved to London around 1962, and managed the Blue Gardenia club in Soho. He also briefly formed a group called the Nightsounds, which featured Albert Lee on guitar. The following year, he won a recording contract with the Columbia label, and recorded a single, "One Way Ticket", using the name Casey Jones. With drummer Ray Stock, he recruited two former members of R&B group the Roosters, guitarist Eric Clapton and bassist Tom McGuinness, and briefly toured as Casey Jones & the Engineers. Clapton and McGuinness left after a few performances, shortly followed by Stock.

Cassar then formed a new group with David Coleman (lead guitar), Roger Cook (rhythm guitar), Jim Redford (bass) and Peter Richards (drums). They played at the Star-Club in Hamburg and became popular in Germany, releasing two singles, "Tall Girl" and "Don't Ha Ha" on the Bellaphon label, before changing their name to Casey Jones & the Governors, apparently in an attempt to stress their British origins. The record label reissued "Don't Ha Ha" – which in fact was a version of the 1958 Huey Smith and the Clowns song "Don't You Just Know It" – under the new band name and it rose to number 2 on the German pop chart. Casey Jones and the Governors continued to tour and record successfully in Germany for a few years, achieving six top 40 singles and releasing two albums on the Gold 12 label, Casey Jones and the Governors (1965) and Don't Ha Ha (1966).

In the 1970s, Cassar, still using the name Casey Jones, worked as a disc jockey in Löhnberg, and recorded a solo album, Casey's Rock 'n' Roll Show. In the 1990s, he formed a new version of Casey Jones and the Governors to play the oldies circuit in Germany, and in 2006 was reported to be living in Unna near Dortmund.

=== Personal life and death ===
Cassar died on 25 December 2022, at the age of 86.
