= List of listed buildings in Forres, Moray =

This is a list of listed buildings in the parish of Forres in Moray, Scotland.

== List ==
Name	Location	Date listed	Geo-coordinates	Notes	Category	LB number	Image
Tolbooth Street, Red Lion Hotel			57°36′35″N 3°36′45″W		C(S)	31751	Upload Photo
18 Urquhart Street, St Florians			57°36′36″N 3°36′38″W		C(S)	31760	Upload Photo
Victoria Road, St John's Rectory			57°36′46″N 3°36′25″W		C(S)	31770	Upload Photo
3 St Leonard's Road Rosebank			57°36′33″N 3°36′34″W		B	31778	Upload Photo
Bridge Street, War Memorial			57°36′29″N 3°37′10″W		B	31627	Upload another image See more images
13 High Street, Glen Cairn			57°36′42″N 3°36′33″W		C(S)	31640	Upload Photo
57 High Street, Royal Bank Of Scotland			57°36′39″N 3°36′44″W		B	31645	Upload Photo
73, 75, 77 And 79 High Street			57°36′37″N 3°36′46″W		C(S)	31648	Upload Photo
89 High Street			57°36′36″N 3°36′48″W		C(S)	31651	Upload Photo
95 And 99 High Street			57°36′36″N 3°36′49″W		B	31653	Upload Photo
101, 103 And 105 High Street			57°36′35″N 3°36′50″W		C(S)	31656	Upload Photo
107, 109 And 111 High Street			57°36′35″N 3°36′50″W		B	31657	Upload Photo
88, 90, 92, 94 High Street			57°36′35″N 3°36′47″W		C(S)	31697	Upload Photo
94A, B, C High Street (Through Pend)			57°36′35″N 3°36′47″W		C(S)	31699	Upload Photo
96, 98 High Street, Clydesdale Bank, With Former Gighouse And Stables To Rear			57°36′35″N 3°36′47″W		B	31700	Upload Photo
Milne's Wynd, 2 And 3 Murdoch Place			57°36′40″N 3°36′41″W		C(S)	31724	Upload Photo
1 And 2 Nairn Road (West End) Including Greywalls Studio			57°36′28″N 3°37′23″W		C(S)	31726	Upload Photo
44 North Road, Berbice			57°36′43″N 3°36′48″W		B	31731	Upload Photo
46 North Road			57°36′43″N 3°36′48″W		C(S)	31732	Upload Photo
Pilmuir Road, 1-6 (Inclusive Nos) Iowa Place			57°36′29″N 3°37′22″W		C(S)	31734	Upload Photo
3 And 4 Bank Lane			57°36′34″N 3°36′49″W		C(S)	31616	Upload Photo
Invererne House, Home Farm Steading With Former Stables And Carriage Houses And Walled Garden			57°37′28″N 3°37′29″W		B	8693	Upload Photo
Manachie Lodge, Gates And Gatepiers Only			57°35′20″N 3°37′05″W		B	8695	Upload Photo
3, 5, 7, 9, 11 Tolbooth Street (Former Market)			57°36′35″N 3°36′43″W		B	31748	Upload Photo
32 Tolbooth Street			57°36′33″N 3°36′41″W		C(S)	31753	Upload Photo
Victoria Road, Carrour			57°36′48″N 3°36′16″W		B	31772	Upload Photo
Burdshaugh, The Cottage			57°36′17″N 3°36′59″W		C(S)	31629	Upload Photo
5 And 5A Cumming Street			57°36′33″N 3°36′50″W		C(S)	31633	Upload Photo
6 Cumming Street			57°36′33″N 3°36′49″W		B	31634	Upload Photo
63, 65, 67 High Street, Carlton Hotel			57°36′38″N 3°36′45″W		B	31646	Upload Photo
113 High Street			57°36′35″N 3°36′51″W		C(S)	31658	Upload Photo
High Street, St Lawrence's Church, Gate Piers And Kirkyard Walls			57°36′34″N 3°36′56″W		B	31663	Upload another image See more images
145 High Street (Former Church Of Scotland Manse)			57°36′32″N 3°36′58″W		B	31674	Upload Photo
145B High Street (Through Pend)			57°36′33″N 3°36′59″W		C(S)	31675	Upload Photo
68, 70 And 72 High Street			57°36′37″N 3°36′44″W		C(S)	31683	Upload Photo
70E High Street (Through Pend)			57°36′36″N 3°36′44″W		C(S)	31687	Upload Photo
74, 76 And 78 High Street			57°36′37″N 3°36′45″W		B	31688	Upload Photo
82, 84 And 86 High Street			57°36′35″N 3°36′46″W		B	31694	Upload Photo
84B, C, D High Street 84E High Street(Through Pend)			57°36′35″N 3°36′46″W		C(S)	31695	Upload Photo
100B High Street(Through Pend)			57°36′34″N 3°36′48″W		B	31703	Upload Photo
102 High Street, Bank Of Scotland			57°36′35″N 3°36′49″W		A	31704	Upload Photo
128, 130, 132, 132A High Street			57°36′33″N 3°36′53″W		B	31710	Upload Photo
160A, 162 High Street			57°36′32″N 3°36′56″W		B	31718	Upload Photo
Little Crook, Little Crook Cottage			57°36′28″N 3°37′12″W		B	31723	Upload Photo
5 Bogton Place, "Inver House"			57°36′29″N 3°37′16″W		B	31624	Upload Photo
Cathay House And Conservatory-Glass House Range			57°36′09″N 3°34′42″W		B	8699	Upload Photo
Tolbooth Street, Glenerney Cottage			57°36′32″N 3°36′42″W		C(S)	31750	Upload Photo
21 Urquhart Street, Cardean			57°36′36″N 3°36′36″W		C(S)	31757	Upload Photo
Victoria Road, Braeriach			57°36′45″N 3°36′26″W		B	31768	Upload Photo
Victoria Road, St John's Episcopal Church			57°36′45″N 3°36′25″W		A	31769	Upload Photo
Victoria Road, Bronte Place			57°36′46″N 3°36′12″W		C(S)	31774	Upload Photo
2 Burdgreen			57°36′35″N 3°37′01″W		C(S)	31628	Upload Photo
45, 45A High Street			57°36′40″N 3°36′41″W		C(S)	31641	Upload Photo
51,53 And 55 High Street			57°36′39″N 3°36′43″W		C(S)	31644	Upload Photo
131-135 (Odd Nos) High Street			57°36′33″N 3°36′57″W		C(S)	31668	Upload Photo
64, 66 High Street			57°36′37″N 3°36′44″W		C(S)	31682	Upload Photo
70A High Street (Through Pend)			57°36′37″N 3°36′44″W		C(S)	31684	Upload Photo
76B High Street(Through Pend)			57°36′36″N 3°36′43″W		C(S)	31691	Upload Photo
High Street Market Cross			57°36′35″N 3°36′48″W		B	31693	Upload Photo
106 High Street			57°36′34″N 3°36′50″W		B	31705	Upload Photo
160B, C High Street (In Close)			57°36′32″N 3°36′56″W		C(S)	31719	Upload Photo
Newbold House, Conservatory And Walled Garden			57°36′13″N 3°35′13″W		B	31727	Upload Photo
North Road, Greenwood			57°36′42″N 3°36′53″W		C(S)	31730	Upload Photo
10 North Street, Restcot			57°36′38″N 3°36′51″W		C(S)	31733	Upload Photo
12 Bank Lane, Invermay			57°36′30″N 3°36′42″W		C(S)	31620	Upload Photo
Dallas Dhu Distillery			57°35′20″N 3°36′57″W		A	8689	Upload another image See more images
Knockomie House (Hotel)			57°35′42″N 3°37′58″W		B	8694	Upload Photo
Bogton			57°36′59″N 3°36′13″W		B	8698	Upload Photo
8 St Leonard's Road			57°36′29″N 3°36′24″W		C(S)	31740	Upload Photo
12 St Leonard's Road, Craigouris			57°36′31″N 3°36′28″W		B	31742	Upload Photo
St Leonard's Road, The Elms And Garden Walls			57°36′31″N 3°36′23″W		B	31743	Upload Photo
St Leonard's Road, Cluny Bank And Garden Walls			57°36′26″N 3°36′05″W		B	31744	Upload Photo
Tolbooth Street, Fountain			57°36′36″N 3°36′45″W		C(S)	31746	Upload Photo
15 Tolbooth Street, Dunroamin			57°36′34″N 3°36′42″W		B	31749	Upload Photo
28 Tolbooth Street And Gatepier			57°36′33″N 3°36′44″W		B	31752	Upload Photo
20B Urquhart Street			57°36′36″N 3°36′37″W		C(S)	31762	Upload Photo
22 Urquhart Street			57°36′36″N 3°36′37″W		C(S)	31763	Upload Photo
22A Urquhart Street			57°36′36″N 3°36′38″W		C(S)	31764	Upload Photo
24 Urquhart Street			57°36′36″N 3°36′37″W		C(S)	31765	Upload Photo
26 Urquhart Street, Strathville			57°36′35″N 3°36′37″W		C(S)	31767	Upload Photo
Victoria Road, Cluny			57°36′49″N 3°36′16″W		B	31773	Upload Photo
Waterford Road, Benromach Distillery, Maltbarn			57°36′49″N 3°37′17″W		B	31776	Upload Photo
1 Gordon Street			57°36′35″N 3°36′53″W		C(S)	31635	Upload Photo
3 Hepworth Lane (Off 73-75 High Street)			57°36′38″N 3°36′49″W		C(S)	31638	Upload Photo
High Street, Mechanics' Institute			57°36′39″N 3°36′43″W		B	31643	Upload another image
93 High Street			57°36′36″N 3°36′48″W		B	31652	Upload Photo
135D,135E High Street (Through Pend)			57°36′34″N 3°36′58″W		C(S)	31672	Upload Photo
44 High Street			57°36′39″N 3°36′41″W		C(S)	31679	Upload Photo
74 And 74A High Street (Through Pend)			57°36′36″N 3°36′44″W		C(S)	31689	Upload Photo
76A High Street(Through Pend)			57°36′36″N 3°36′44″W		C(S)	31690	Upload Photo
High Street, Tolbooth			57°36′36″N 3°36′46″W		A	31692	Upload another image
82A, B High Street			57°36′35″N 3°36′46″W		C(S)	31696	Upload Photo
118, 118A High Street			57°36′34″N 3°36′52″W		B	31708	Upload Photo
122, 124, 126 High Street, Longview Hotel			57°36′33″N 3°36′52″W		B	31709	Upload Photo
134, 138, 140 High Street			57°36′33″N 3°36′54″W		B	31711	Upload Photo
Nairn Road, Oak Cottage			57°36′28″N 3°37′24″W		C(S)	31725	Upload Photo
Newbold House, Gate Lodge And Gatepiers			57°36′10″N 3°35′20″W		B	31728	Upload Photo
North Road, Spinningdale			57°36′40″N 3°36′54″W		C(S)	31729	Upload Photo
Orchard Road, Orchard House Garden Walls And Gate Piers			57°36′29″N 3°36′51″W		B	31738	Upload Photo
6 St Leonard's Road			57°36′32″N 3°36′30″W		B	31739	Upload Photo
25 Urquhart Street, Bellevue			57°36′36″N 3°36′35″W		C(S)	31759	Upload Photo
2 St Leonard's Road Laurelbank			57°36′33″N 3°36′35″W		B	31777	Upload Photo
4 Hepworth Lane (Off 73-75 High Street)			57°36′38″N 3°36′49″W		C(S)	31639	Upload Photo
69 And 71 High Street			57°36′37″N 3°36′46″W		B	31647	Upload Photo
115C High Street (Through Pend)			57°36′35″N 3°36′52″W		C(S)	31661	Upload Photo
129D High Street (Through Pend)			57°36′34″N 3°36′58″W		C(S)	31667	Upload Photo
135A High Street (Through Pend)			57°36′33″N 3°36′57″W		C(S)	31669	Upload Photo
30 High Street			57°36′40″N 3°36′39″W		C(S)	31678	Upload Photo
46, 48 And 50, 50A High Street			57°36′38″N 3°36′42″W		C(S)	31680	Upload Photo
88A, B High Street (Through Pend)			57°36′35″N 3°36′47″W		C(S)	31698	Upload Photo
100 High Street			57°36′35″N 3°36′49″W		B	31701	Upload Photo
154 High Street			57°36′33″N 3°36′56″W		B	31713	Upload Photo
154A High Street (In Close)			57°36′32″N 3°36′55″W		B	31714	Upload Photo
Russell Place, Firth View			57°36′46″N 3°36′30″W		C(S)	31736	Upload Photo
6 And 7 Bank Lane			57°36′33″N 3°36′48″W		C(S)	31618	Upload Photo
17 Batchen Street			57°36′42″N 3°36′42″W		C(S)	31623	Upload Photo
Findhorn Viaduct			57°36′27″N 3°38′26″W		A	8690	Upload Photo
Springfield House And Gatepiers			57°37′05″N 3°35′54″W		B	8696	Upload Photo
South Street, 1 And 2 Nicol Place			57°36′33″N 3°36′38″W		C(S)	31737	Upload Photo
1 Tolbooth Street			57°36′36″N 3°36′44″W		C(S)	31745	Upload Photo
17 Urquhart Street			57°36′37″N 3°36′37″W		C(S)	31756	Upload Photo
23 Urquhart Street, Lenmohr			57°36′36″N 3°36′36″W		C(S)	31758	Upload Photo
24B Urquhart Street			57°36′35″N 3°36′37″W		C(S)	31766	Upload Photo
Cluny Hill, Nelson's Tower			57°36′41″N 3°36′03″W		B	31631	Upload another image See more images
85 And 87 High Street And Flats 1 And 2 North Street Place, North Field			57°36′36″N 3°36′48″W		C(S)	31650	Upload Photo
97H High Street, (Through Pend)			57°36′36″N 3°36′51″W		C(S)	31655	Upload Photo
117-121 High Street			57°36′35″N 3°36′52″W		C(S)	31662	Upload Photo
129 High Street			57°36′33″N 3°36′56″W		C(S)	31664	Upload Photo
129B High Street (Through Pend)			57°36′33″N 3°36′57″W		C(S)	31665	Upload Photo
139 High Street			57°36′33″N 3°36′57″W		B	31673	Upload Photo
114, 116 High Street And 1A Cumming Street			57°36′34″N 3°36′51″W		C(S)	31707	Upload Photo
High Street, Monument To Dr James Thomson, Castle Hill			57°36′30″N 3°37′06″W		C(S)	31722	Upload Photo
5 Bank Lane			57°36′33″N 3°36′48″W		C(S)	31617	Upload Photo
Bank Lane, Granville			57°36′32″N 3°36′44″W		C(S)	31619	Upload Photo
6 Bogton Place, "Fyfe Place"			57°36′29″N 3°37′18″W		B	31625	Upload Photo
St Leonards Road, Leanchoil Hospital Main Block			57°36′14″N 3°35′30″W		B	13313	Upload Photo
Cathay House, Gate Lodge And Gatepiers			57°36′06″N 3°34′37″W		B	8688	Upload Photo
Balnageith Farmhouse			57°35′56″N 3°38′01″W		B	8697	Upload Photo
10 St Leonard's Road			57°36′28″N 3°36′21″W		C(S)	31741	Upload Photo
Tolbooth Street, Falconer Museum			57°36′36″N 3°36′44″W		B	31747	Upload Photo
Tytler Street, Hamilton's Auction Mart			57°36′32″N 3°37′26″W		B	31754	Upload Photo
3 Urquhart Street			57°36′38″N 3°36′39″W		C(S)	31755	Upload Photo
20A Urquhart Street			57°36′36″N 3°36′37″W		C(S)	31761	Upload Photo
Bridge Street, Castle Bridge			57°36′31″N 3°37′09″W		B	31626	Upload Photo
29 Caroline Street, The Castle			57°36′40″N 3°36′52″W		C(S)	31630	Upload Photo
1 Hepworth Lane (Off 73-75 High Street)			57°36′38″N 3°36′48″W		B	31636	Upload Photo
81 And 83 High Street			57°36′37″N 3°36′47″W		C(S)	31649	Upload Photo
115A High Street, (Through Pend)			57°36′35″N 3°36′51″W		C(S)	31659	Upload Photo
115B High Street(Through Pend)			57°36′35″N 3°36′52″W		C(S)	31660	Upload Photo
129C High Street (Through Pend)			57°36′34″N 3°36′57″W		C(S)	31666	Upload Photo
135C High Street (Through Pend)			57°36′33″N 3°36′57″W		C(S)	31671	Upload Photo
22,24 High Street			57°36′40″N 3°36′38″W		B	31677	Upload Photo
60, 62 High Street			57°36′37″N 3°36′44″W		C(S)	31681	Upload Photo
100A High Street(Through Pend)			57°36′35″N 3°36′49″W		B	31702	Upload Photo
High Street, Castlehill Church			57°36′31″N 3°36′58″W		B	31721	Upload Photo
Robertson Place, Westpark House, Outbuildings And Westpark Cottage			57°36′27″N 3°37′29″W		C(S)	31735	Upload Photo
1 Bank Lane			57°36′34″N 3°36′50″W		C(S)	31614	Upload Photo
2 Bank Lane			57°36′34″N 3°36′49″W		C(S)	31615	Upload Photo
7 Batchen Street			57°36′41″N 3°36′41″W		C(S)	31622	Upload Photo
Victoria Road, Roseville			57°36′47″N 3°36′21″W		B	31771	Upload Photo
Victoria Road, Forres House Lodge And Gate Piers			57°36′45″N 3°36′19″W		B	31775	Upload Photo
3 And 3A Cumming Street			57°36′33″N 3°36′50″W		C(S)	31632	Upload Photo
2 Hepworth Lane (Off 73-75 High Street)			57°36′38″N 3°36′48″W		C(S)	31637	Upload Photo
High Street, St Leonard's Church			57°36′45″N 3°36′52″W		B	31642	Upload Photo
97J High Street, (Through Pend)			57°36′36″N 3°36′50″W		C(S)	31654	Upload Photo
135B High Street (Through Pend)			57°36′33″N 3°36′57″W		C(S)	31670	Upload Photo
High Street, Anderson's Primary School, (Front Block Facing High Street Only) Gatepiers And Railings			57°36′40″N 3°36′35″W		B	31676	Upload Photo
70B High Street (Through Pend)			57°36′37″N 3°36′44″W		C(S)	31685	Upload Photo
70C High Street (Through Pend)			57°36′36″N 3°36′43″W		C(S)	31686	Upload Photo
108, 110, 112 High Street			57°36′34″N 3°36′50″W		B	31706	Upload Photo
144 High Street			57°36′33″N 3°36′55″W		C(S)	31712	Upload Photo
154B High Street (In Close)			57°36′32″N 3°36′55″W		B	31715	Upload Photo
154C High Street (In Close)			57°36′32″N 3°36′55″W		B	31716	Upload Photo
154D High Street (In Close)			57°36′31″N 3°36′54″W		B	31717	Upload Photo
168 High Street			57°36′32″N 3°36′57″W		C(S)	31720	Upload Photo
5 Batchen Street			57°36′41″N 3°36′40″W		C(S)	31621	Upload Photo
St Leonards Road, Leanchoil Hospital Lodge And Fountain			57°36′14″N 3°35′37″W		B	13314	Upload Photo
Greshop House And Rear Range			57°36′41″N 3°38′01″W		B	8691	Upload Photo
Invererne House			57°37′29″N 3°37′19″W		A	8692	Upload Photo

== Key ==
The scheme for classifying buildings in Scotland is:

- Category A: "buildings of national or international importance, either architectural or historic; or fine, little-altered examples of some particular period, style or building type."
- Category B: "buildings of regional or more than local importance; or major examples of some particular period, style or building type, which may have been altered."
- Category C: "buildings of local importance; lesser examples of any period, style, or building type, as originally constructed or moderately altered; and simple traditional buildings which group well with other listed buildings."

In March 2016 there were 47,288 listed buildings in Scotland. Of these, 8% were Category A, and 50% were Category B, with the remaining 42% being Category C.

== See also ==
- List of listed buildings in Moray
