= Start Movin' (In My Direction) =

Single by Sal Mineo
- B-side: "Love Affair"
- Released: April 22, 1957
- Genre: Pop
- Length: 2:31
- Label: Epic
- Songwriter(s): Bobby Stevenson, David Hill

Sal Mineo singles chronology
| "Dino" (1957) | "Start Movin' (In My Direction)" (1957) | "Lasting Love" (1957) |

"Start Movin' (In My Direction)" is a song written by Bobby Stevenson and David Hill, and performed by Sal Mineo featuring the Ray Ellis Orchestra. It reached number 9 on the U.S. pop chart and number 16 on UK Singles Chart in 1957.

== Other charting versions ==
- Terry Dene released a version of the song which reached number 15 on the UK Singles Chart in 1957.

== Other versions ==
- Edna McGriff released a version of the song as the B-side to her 1957 single "Freight Train".
