= Frank Fraser Darling =

British scientist (1903–1979)

Sir Frank Fraser Darling FRSE (23 June 1903 – 22 October 1979) was an English ecologist, ornithologist, farmer, conservationist and author, who is strongly associated with the highlands and islands of Scotland. He gives his name to the Fraser Darling effect.

== Early life ==
Fraser Darling was born in Soresby Street in Chesterfield in northern England, the illegitimate son of Harriet Cowley Ellse Darling and Cpt. Frank Moss.

His mother was the daughter of a prosperous family from Sheffield. Her family wanted the child to be fostered and forgotten about. However, she would not cooperate and refused to part with Frank. His father, whom he never met, left for East Africa around the time of his birth, and was killed in action on the Kenya-Tanganyika border in 1917.

In 1966, Darling revealed to his son that the pioneering plant geographer, Charles Edward Moss, was his uncle.

== Career ==
After running away from school at the age of 15, Darling was sent to work on a farm in the Pennines. He then studied at the Midland Agricultural College (now part of the University of Nottingham), at Sutton Bonington in the Borough of Rushcliffe in Nottinghamshire, and obtained diplomas in agriculture and dairying. Soon afterwards he married Marian Fraser ("Bobbie") and took the double-barrelled surname Fraser Darling, which, although he was divorced from Bobbie in 1948, he used until the end of his life.

While working as a Clean Milk Advisor in Buckinghamshire, and longing for a research post in Scotland, Fraser Darling heard about the work of the Institute of Animal Genetics at Edinburgh University, and in the early 1930s the Director, Francis Albert Eley Crew, offered him a place there to study for a PhD. From 1929 to 1930 he was Director of the Commonwealth Bureau of Animal Breeding and Genetics, part of the Commonwealth Agricultural Bureaux, at Edinburgh.

In 1934, he was elected a Fellow of the Royal Society of Edinburgh. His proposers included Francis Albert Eley Crew, William Christopher Miller, and A. D. Buchanan Smith.

Living at Dundonnell and later in the Summer Isles, Fraser Darling began the work that was to mark him as a naturalist-philosopher of original turn of mind and great intellectual drive. He described the social and breeding behaviour of the red deer, gulls, and the grey seal respectively, in the three academic works A Herd of Red Deer, Bird Flocks and the Breeding Cycle and A Naturalist on Rona. The Fraser Darling effect, proposed by Fraser Darling in 1938, is the simultaneous and shortened breeding season that occurs in large colonies of birds.

The outbreak of the Second World War put an end to Fraser Darling's hopes of undertaking further research on the grey seal and, being too old for active military service, he chose to farm rather than leave the west coast of Scotland for wartime civilian work. Between 1939 and 1943 Fraser Darling reclaimed derelict land to agricultural production on Tanera Mòr in the Summer Isles. In 1942, the wartime Secretary of State for Scotland, Thomas Johnston, asked him to run an agricultural advisory programme in the crofting areas of the Scottish Highlands and Islands. He agreed, and for two years he travelled, taught and wrote articles that were later published in book form as Crofting Agriculture. In 1944 he was appointed as Director of the West Highland Survey based at Kilcamb Lodge on the Strontian Estate in Ardnamurchan

The aim of the West Highland Survey, Fraser Darling wrote, was "to gather a solid body of facts... which would serve as a foundation for a future policy for the region". To gather these facts, he recruited five assistants, all young Highlanders: people personally acquainted with the crofting life who could converse with crofters in their native Gaelic rather than in the English of officialdom. Concerns at the Department of Agriculture about the radical nature of the findings of the survey and its implied criticism of the policies it had been pursuing led to repeated delays to its publication. It was finally published as West Highland Survey: An Essay in Human Ecology in 1955. In the concluding sentence of his introduction Fraser Darling wrote that: "the bald unpalatable fact is emphasized that the Highlands and Islands are largely a devastated terrain, and that any policy which ignores this fact cannot hope to achieve rehabilitation". The "devastation", he further concluded, was the inevitable outcome of bad land use. The Highlands had first been stripped of their natural forest cover, then they had been subjected to repeated burning, to intensive grazing, to overstocking and to other forms of maltreatment which had drained their soils of fertility and made them steadily less productive. Frank Mears drew on the preliminary report of the West Highland Survey (1948) in his interim report on planning and redevelopment in the County of Sutherland (1951).

In 1949, Julian Huxley, UNESCO's first Director-General, invited Fraser Darling to be one of UNESCO's representatives at the United Nations conference on conservation at Lake Success on Long Island. Huxley had been interested in Fraser Darling's studies on animal behaviour since the early 1940s, and the two had corresponded while Fraser Darling was living on Tanera Mor.

His 1969 BBC Reith Lectures (entitled Wilderness and Plenty) were an important contribution to the growing debate on man's responsibility for his natural environment. They were described at the time as "an eloquent statement of the dependence of all living things on one another".

Fraser Darling received an Honorary Doctorate from Heriot-Watt University in 1971.

He died in Forres in Morayshire in north-east Scotland in October 1979.

== Family ==
Darling married three times: firstly in 1922 to Marian Fraser (dissolved); secondly in 1948 to Averil Morley (d.1957); thirdly in 1960 to Christina MacInnes Brotchie.

== Honours and awards ==
- 1933–1936: Awarded Barnard Medal
- 1934: Elected Fellow, Royal Society of Edinburgh
- 1936–1939: Appointed Carnegie Research Fellow
- 1947: Awarded Mungo Park Medal, Royal Scottish Geographical Society
- 1970: Awarded Knighthood
- 1970–1973: Appointed member of the Royal Commission on Environmental Pollution
- 1972: Awarded Centenary Medal, US National Park Service
- 1973: Created Commandeur, Order of the Golden Ark (Netherlands)

== Selected bibliography ==
- 1932 – Colour Inheritance in Bull-terriers. (Chapter in book by T.W. Hogarth).
- 1932 – The Physiological and Genetical Aspects of Sterility in Domesticated Animals.
- 1932 – Biology of the Fleece of the Scottish Mountain Blackface.
- 1937 – A Herd of Red Deer. A Study in Animal Behaviour. Oxford University Press.
- 1938 – Bird Flocks and the Breeding Cycle: a contribution to the study of avian sociality. Cambridge University Press.
- 1938 – Wild Country. A Highland Naturalist's Notes and Pictures. Cambridge University Press.
- 1939 – The Seasons and the Farmer: a Book for Children. Cambridge University Press. (Illustrated by Charles Tunnicliffe).
- 1939 – A Naturalist on Rona: essays of a biologist in isolation. Clarendon Press: Oxford.
- 1940 – Island Years. G. Bell and Sons.
- 1941 – The Seasons and the Fisherman. Cambridge University Press.
- 1942 – The Story of Scotland. Collins: London.
- 1943 – Wildlife of Britain. Collins: London.
- 1943 – Island Farm. G. Bell and Sons.
- 1943 – The Care of Farm Animals.
- 1945 – Crofting Agriculture. Its Practice in the West Highlands and Islands. Oliver and Boyd: Edinburgh.
- 1947 – Natural History in the Highlands and Islands.
- 1949 – Sandy the Red Deer. OUP: London.
- 1953 – Alaska: An Ecological Reconnaissance. Ronald Press Company: New York.
- 1955 – West Highland Survey: An Essay in Human Ecology.
- 1956 – Pelican in the Wilderness: a naturalist's odyssey in North America. Allen & Unwin: London.
- 1960 – An Ecological Renaissance of the Mara Plains in Kenya Colony. Wildlife Society.
- 1960 – Wild life in an African territory. (Study made for the Game and Tsetse Control Dept of Northern Rhodesia). Oxford University: London.
- 1966 – Future Environments of North America: Transformation of a Continent. (With John P. Milton). Natural History Press: New York.
- 1969 – The Highlands and Islands. (Revised edition of Natural History in the Highlands and Islands, with J. Morton Boyd). Collins: London. ISBN 0-00-631955-6
- 1969 – Impacts of Man on the Biosphere.
- 1970 – Wilderness And Plenty: the Reith Lectures 1969. BBC. ISBN 0-563-09281-5
- 1971 – A Conversation on Population, Environment, and Human Well-Being. Conservation Foundation: Washington.
- 1972 – Foreword to "What We Eat Today" by Michael and Sheilagh Crawford, Neville Spearman, London SBN 85435 360 7.
