= Larry Parnes =

English music manager (1929–1989)

- Born: Laurence Maurice Parnes; 3 September 1929; London, England
- Died: 4 August 1989 (aged 59) London, England
- Genres: Manager, promoter
- Years active: 1954–1981

Laurence Maurice Parnes (3 September 1929 – 4 August 1989) was a British pop manager and impresario. He was the first major British rock manager, and his stable of singers included many of the most successful British rock and roll singers of the late 1950s and early 1960s.

Parnes' reputation was later damaged by testimony from many of the artists he managed in the late fifties and early sixties who alleged they were exploited.

== Early years ==
Parnes was born to a Jewish family in Willesden, London, England. After leaving school he began work in a clothing store, and by the age of 18 ran a women's clothing shop in Romford, Essex. He then bought a share in a bar in Romilly Street, Soho. He agreed to invest in a touring play, The House of Shame, which became both successful and notorious in 1954 after its publicist, John Kennedy, persuaded two actresses to stand outside the theatre dressed as prostitutes.

== Music management ==
In 1956, with John Kennedy, Parnes began to manage young rock and roll singer Tommy Hicks; he and John Kennedy approached his parents, after Hicks, aged 19, had already signed another contract, which was under the legal age. Hicks anglicised the name of his Swedish grandfather to become known as Tommy Steele. Steele achieved popular success, some of his songs being co-written by Parnes' friend Lionel Bart, and Parnes succeeded in presenting Steele as an "all-round entertainer". Parnes claimed in a court action that he and Kennedy took 40 per cent of Steele's "gross takings", out of which they had to pay 10 per cent to booking agents as well as the costs of Steele's accommodation, advertising and publicity, travel and other aspects "needed to keep Tommy on the road to stardom". This became the standard arrangement with Parnes' artists.

After Steele's success, Parnes looked to find other young men who he could groom to become pop stars. At Bart's suggestion, he next signed Reg Patterson (né Smith), whom he re-christened Marty Wilde, and who also rose to pop stardom in the UK. Parnes developed a network of contacts within the British recording industry and entertainment business, with leading British songwriters providing songs for his growing stable of talent, and many of his protégés achieving success on the UK Singles Chart. Parnes' approach was to select handsome young men who would be attractive to a teenage audience. He also gave them new stage names, which were rumoured to reflect what he considered to be their sexual characteristics. (Note: In an interview involving Marty Wilde, Parnes explained the change of name: "Marty – that's a friendly name – and Wilde – that's the spirit. The name must fit the personality. Very important".) Among those he managed with at least some degree of success were Billy Fury (originally Ron Wycherley), Vince Eager (Roy Taylor), Dickie Pride (Richard Knellar), Lance Fortune (Chris Morris), Duffy Power (Ray Howard), Johnny Gentle (John Askew), Terry Dene (Terence Williams), Nelson Keene (Malcolm Holland), and Georgie Fame (Clive Powell). He also managed Tommy Bruce, as well as Joe Brown, who he unsuccessfully tried to persuade to change his name to Elmer Twitch.

Music journalist Richie Unterberger has commented:

Parnes' performers were groomed as teen idols, rock music being a convenient way to eventually establish all-around entertainers who could also work in straight pop music, variety shows, and film. Image, more than content, was essential to the appeal of Parnes' protégés.

Sometimes, Parnes employed his charges himself rather than being employed by them, and paid them a weekly wage. According to one report:

Vince Eager began to wonder why he had never received any record royalties. "You're not entitled to any," Larry Parnes told him. "But it says in my contract that I am," Eager protested. "It also says I have power of attorney over you, and I've decided you're not getting any," Parnes replied.

The BBC TV programme Panorama featured Parnes as a "beat svengali" and the press gave him the nickname "Mr Parnes, Shillings and Pence". He was bitingly satirised as the manipulative "Major Rafe Ralph" by Peter Sellers, from a script by Frank Muir and Denis Norden, on the 1959 album Songs For Swingin' Sellers.

Parnes also promoted concerts, including the 1960 tour by Gene Vincent and Eddie Cochran during which Cochran was killed in a road crash. Later the same year he hired the Silver Beetles, an early incarnation of the then-unknown Beatles, to back one of his singers, Johnny Gentle, on a short tour of Scotland. Although Gentle tried to persuade him to manage the group, Parnes decided not to do so. Parnes developed the idea of the package tour, for which his stars toured the country together in a bus, playing one-night stands around the country. In 1962, he hired the Tornados as backing group for Billy Fury, and also claimed to have given "their first breaks" to entertainers Jimmy Tarbuck, Rolf Harris and Mike Yarwood.

== Theatre and other interests ==
Parnes remained an influential impresario even after the rise of the Beatles and other groups had eclipsed those in his stable. (Note: Parnes was a friend of Beatles manager Brian Epstein and in 1963 attempted to hire them to perform in a series of Sunday concerts on the pier at Great Yarmouth.) However, his attitude and approach rapidly became old-fashioned. In 1967 he announced that he was going to devote himself to the theatre, and in 1968 put on Fortune and Men's Eyes, a play about homosexuality in a Canadian prison, but it lost money. He bought a lease of the Cambridge Theatre in London's West End in 1972, where during his tenure the first UK production of Chicago played. During the 1970s he ran the business affairs of the Olympic ice skater John Curry, and presented two stage productions with him at the Cambridge Theatre and at the London Palladium. He also persuaded actress Joan Collins to perform her first West End play, The Last of Mrs Cheyney, at his theatre in 1976.

Parnes was a horse racing fan, and owned racehorses, including Cambridge Gold, named after his involvement in the Cambridge Theatre and John Curry. He had a penthouse property in South Kensington, and country mansions in Send, Surrey, and Icklesham, East Sussex.

== Later years ==
Parnes retired in 1981 and died from meningitis in London in 1989, aged 59. His obituary in The Daily Telegraph said:

Parnes is said to have renamed some of his stars for their sexual potential, but though he undoubtedly adored the company of young men he was circumspect about mixing business with pleasure. The greatest loves of his life were two Alsatian dogs, Prince and Duke, whose cremated remains were prominently displayed in his South Kensington penthouse.
