= Forres Tolbooth =

Municipal building in Forres, Scotland

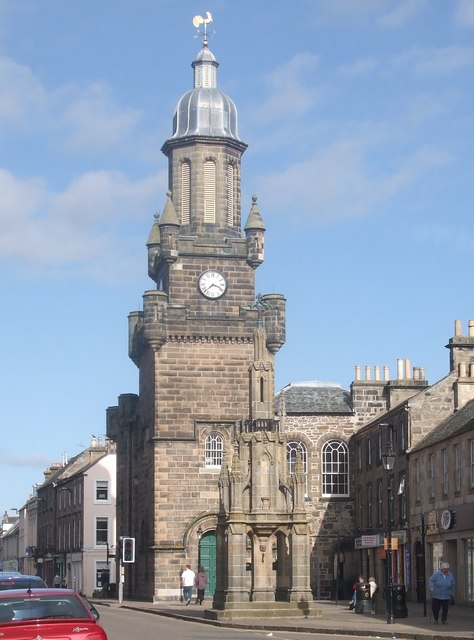
- The building in 2008

- Shown in Moray
- 57.6100°N 3.6129°W
- Location: High Street, Forres

History
- Built: 1839

Site notes
- Architect: William Robertson
- Architectural style: Scottish baronial style

Listed Building – Category A
- Official name: High Street, Tolbooth
- Designated: 30 March 1983
- Reference no.: LB31692

The Forres Tolbooth is a municipal building on the High Street in Forres in Scotland. The building, which is used as a visitor attraction, is a Category A listed building.

== History ==
The first tolbooth in Forres was completed in the mid-16th century. It was primarily used as a prison, but was in a ruinous condition by 1655. Extensive repairs were carried out in the 1670s and the late 1690s. A bell was installed in 1708 and a clock was installed in 1711.

The foundation stone for the current structure was laid in 1838. It was designed by William Robertson in the Scottish baronial style, built in ashlar stone, and was completed in 1839. The design involved a five-stage tower facing southwest down the High Street. There was a round headed doorway with an archivolt in the first stage, a round headed window with an archivolt in the second stage, a corbelled parapet with corner bartizans at the top of the third stage, clock faces with more corner bartizans in the fourth stage, and a tall octagonal belfry in the fifth stage, all surmounted by an ogee-shaped roof, a small cupola and a weather vane in the shape of a cockerel. There was a three-storey courthouse block behind. Internally, the principal rooms were some vaulted rooms in the tower, six prison cells, and a courtroom, which featured a coffered ceiling and stained glass windows depicting Saint Lawrence, on the first floor of the block behind.

A mercat cross, designed by Thomas Mackenzie closely resembling the Scott Monument, was erected just to the west of the tolbooth in 1844. The building was closed to the public in 1991 and was subsequently left largely vacant except for two offices used by Moray Council.

By 2011, the condition of the fabric of the building was deteriorating and it was placed on the Buildings at Risk Register for Scotland. The building was transferred from Moray Council to the newly-formed Forres Heritage Trust in 2014. After extensive restoration works, which included refurbishment of the courtroom, a new staircase in the tower and masonry repairs, the building re-opened as a visitor attraction in 2022. Tours of the building reached the prison cells, the courtroom and then the tower. The complex also began hosting concerts and other events: a marriage ceremony took place in the courtroom in April 2022, and concert performers there have included the folk singer, Ivan Drever, in April 2024. The building was lit up with energy efficient floodlights to help promote tourism from January 2024.

== See also ==
- List of Category A listed buildings in Moray
- List of listed buildings in Forres, Moray
