= Fraser Darling effect =

Pattern in avian breeding seasons

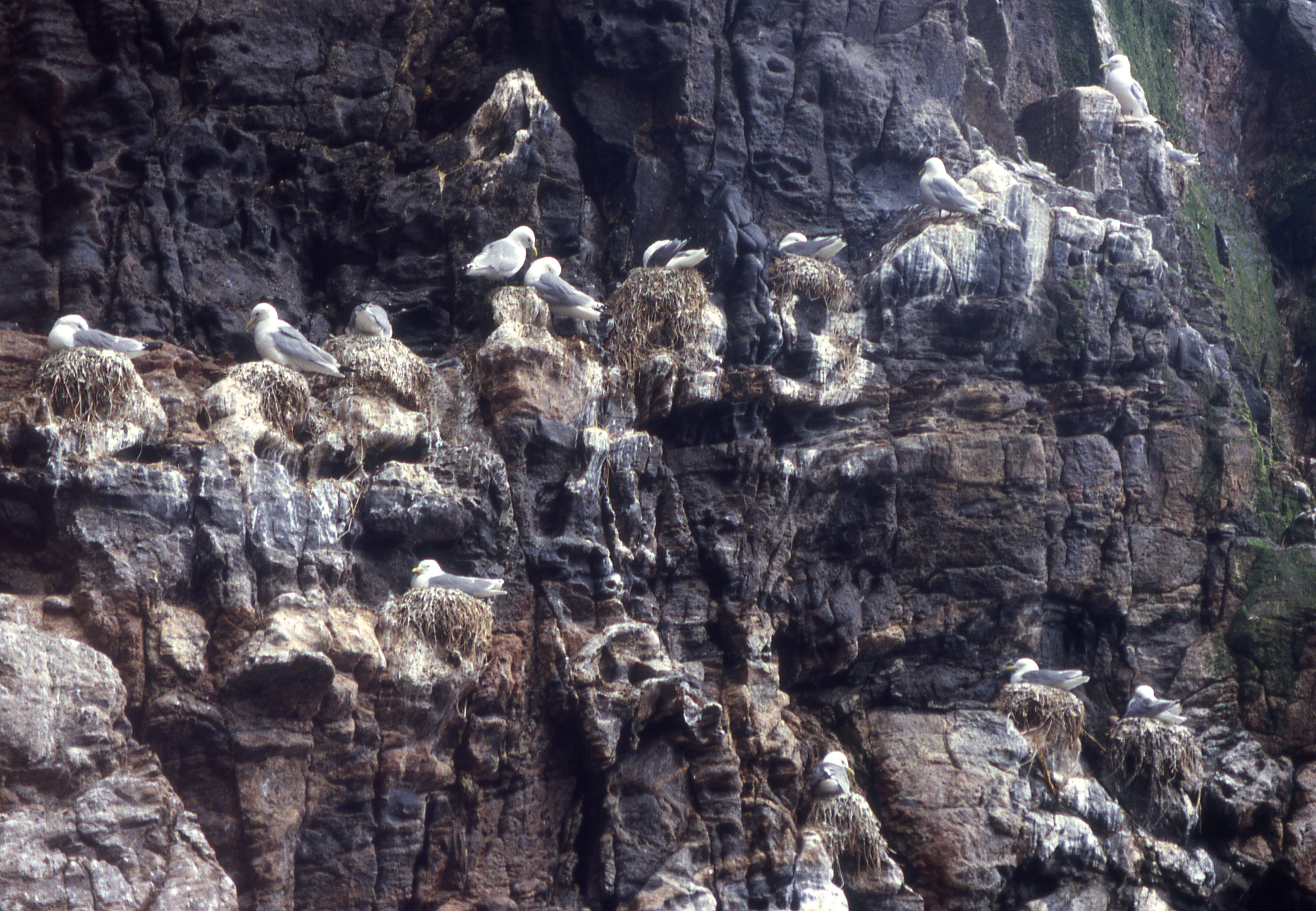
Kittiwake nests on Runde

The Fraser Darling effect is the simultaneous and shortened breeding season that occurs in large colonies of birds. This synchronized and accelerated breeding leads to a greater chance of survival for each individual offspring.

The effect is named after Sir Frank Fraser Darling who proposed it in 1938. While studying herring gulls off the English coast, Fraser Darling noticed that individual gulls rarely raised their young past the fledgling stage. This led him to the conclusion that the birds received sexual stimulation not only from their mates but also from other birds of the same species.

In 1956, a study conducted by Colson and White on the mating patterns of kittiwake showed that the effect only extended for two meters and that, for groups of birds who nested more sparsely, a longer breeding time was evident in the population as a whole. However, this particular species nested in areas that were hard for predators to reach and therefore relied less on this phenomenon than other species that were more vulnerable to predation. In 1968, while studying gulls, Horn found that "clumped nesting improves foraging efficiency and predation avoidance only when the colony is built in a large expanse of nesting habitat, surrounded by abundant, but patchily distributed food."

Since Fraser Darling's initial observation, the phenomenon has also been observed in Brewer's blackbirds, European herring gulls, black-headed gulls, and gannets; however, other studies conducted since have not been able to confirm it in other various species of gulls.
