= Tommy Moore (musician) =

English drummer (1931–1981)

- Moore in 1971

Background information
- Born: Thomas Henry Moore; 12 September 1931; Liverpool, England
- Died: 29 September 1981 (aged 50) Liverpool, England
- Genres: Rock; rock and roll
- Occupations: Musician; Forklift driver
- Instrument: Drums
- Years active: 1960

Thomas Henry Moore (12 September 1931 – 29 September 1981) was an English drummer who played with the Beatles from May to June 1960.

Born in Liverpool, Moore worked as a fork-lift truck driver and part-time musician. He first played drums with the Silver Beetles in May 1960, at the suggestion of manager Allan Williams, and later that month travelled to Scotland with John Lennon, Paul McCartney, George Harrison and Stuart Sutcliffe, when they acted as a backing band for singer Johnny Gentle. During the tour, he was injured and lost his front teeth when the band's van, driven by Gentle, had a minor accident. However, Lennon and the Scottish organiser of the tour took him out of hospital and insisted that he perform with the rest of the group. After they returned to Liverpool, Moore had already decided that he had 'had enough of Lennon'; when he did not appear for a gig one night, the rest of the band went round to his flat, and were told by his wife, Veronica (Vera) Hughes that he had gone back to his steady job at the bottle works. When they tried to persuade her otherwise, she apparently shouted 'you can all piss off!' He undertook one further performance with the group, before they left for Germany with Pete Best as their drummer in August 1960.

Moore continued to work in Liverpool and died of a brain haemorrhage in September 1981 at the age of 50. The death record for Thomas Henry Moore in the September quarter of 1981 in Liverpool states that he was born in 1931 rather than 1924 as sometimes stated; this made him 28 when he played with the Beatles, rather than 36.
