= Johnny Gentle =

British singer (1936–2024)

- Johnny Gentle in 1960

Background information
- Also known as: Darren Young
- Born: John Askew; 8 December 1936; Liverpool, England
- Died: 29 February 2024 (aged 87)
- Genres: Rock, pop
- Occupations: Singer, songwriter
- Years active: 1959–mid 1960s
- Labels: Philips, Parlophone

John Askew (8 December 1936 – 29 February 2024), known as Johnny Gentle and later Darren Young, was a songwriter and crooner from Liverpool, England.

== Life and career ==
John Askew was born on 8 December 1936 in Liverpool, where he also grew up. After leaving school he was apprenticed as a carpenter, and, using a borrowed book for instructions, made his own guitar. He teamed up with Bobby Crawford and the pair began performing at local clubs, singing Everly Brothers songs, before Askew took a job working on a luxury ocean liner. On his return, he entered talent competitions as a solo singer, and changed his stage name, first to George Baker and then to Ricky Damone. He moved to London and worked on a building site, before winning a talent competition at the Locarno Ballroom in Streatham. He was auditioned by manager Larry Parnes, who secured him a recording contract with Philips Records in 1959, and gave him the stage name Johnny Gentle.

Gentle released two singles on Philips in 1959, the self-penned "Wendy", and "Milk From The Coconut", but they did not make the charts, and nor did an EP, The Gentle Touch, containing "I Like the Way", "Darlin' Won't You Wait", "Milk from the Coconut", and "This Friendly World". In early May 1960, Parnes co-promoted, with Allan Williams, a show at Liverpool Stadium starring Gene Vincent supported by local groups Cass and the Cassanovas, Rory Storm and the Hurricanes and Gerry and the Pacemakers. Parnes thought it would be a good idea to use Liverpool groups as backing bands for his artists, who included Billy Fury, and held auditions on 10 May 1960. This resulted in the Silver Beetles being selected to back Gentle on a short Scottish tour.

The tour, between 20 and 28 May 1960, included performances at Alloa, Inverness, Fraserburgh, Keith, Forres, Nairn and Peterhead. At the time, the group comprised John Lennon, Paul McCartney, George Harrison, Stuart Sutcliffe and drummer Tommy Moore. Although the group themselves were not specifically credited in tour publicity, being billed as "Johnny Gentle and his group", informally McCartney used the pseudonym Paul Ramon, Harrison called himself Carl Harrison, Lennon was "Long John", and Sutcliffe was known as Stuart de Staël. Their repertoire included "It Doesn't Matter Anymore", "Raining in My Heart", "I Need Your Love Tonight", "Poor Little Fool", "(I Don't Know Why) But I Do", "C'mon Everybody" (a tribute to Eddie Cochran, who had died while on tour with Gene Vincent a few weeks earlier), and "He'll Have to Go". Gentle later wrote:

"We met at the venue just half an hour before our first public performance together and all things considered we sounded pretty good from the off. Every night the sound we made got better, by the end of the tour I knew these boys were as good as any I'd worked with....."

Gentle wrote a song on the tour, "I've Just Fallen For Someone", reputedly with help from Lennon. The song was later recorded by Adam Faith on his second album. Gentle also claimed to have suggested that Parnes sign the group, but Parnes at the time was only interested in managing solo singers. After their return to Liverpool, Gentle sang onstage with the group at one of their performances, but, by the time he next needed a band to tour with, they were unavailable as they had travelled to Hamburg.

Johnny Gentle released three further singles on the Philips label: "Darlin' Won't You Wait", "After My Laughter Came Tears" (both 1960) and "Darlin'" (1961). He also made several appearances on TV and radio shows. Changing his stage name to Darren Young, he released his own version of "I've Just Fallen for Someone" on Parlophone in 1962, again without success. By 1964, he had joined the Viscounts.

Gentle later moved to Jersey, where he worked as a joiner. He then moved to Kent, and made occasional appearances at Beatles fan conventions. In 1998 he co-wrote a book, Johnny Gentle & the Beatles: First Ever Tour. Gentle died on 29 February 2024, at the age of 87.
