= Terry Dene =

English rock music singer (born 1938)

- Born: Terence Williams; 20 December 1938 (age 87)
- Origin: Elephant & Castle, London, England
- Genres: Rock and roll, pop
- Occupation: Singer
- Instrument: Vocals
- Years active: 1956–present
- Labels: Decca Records, Pilgrim Records

Terry Dene (born Terence Williams; 20 December 1938) is a British rock music singer popular in the late 1950s and early 60s. He had three Top Twenty hits between June 1957 and May 1958.

== Career ==
Dene was born in Lancaster Street, Elephant & Castle, London, and was discovered by Paul Lincoln at the 2i's Coffee Bar (the London club that helped launch Tommy Steele, Adam Faith and Cliff Richard) in Soho in the late 1950s. Jack Good, producer of Six-Five Special, and Dick Rowe helped him obtain a recording contract with Decca. At the time he was regarded as the British Elvis and recognised as one of the best voices of the rock and roll era of pre-Beatles Britain.

In 1957, his first single, "A White Sport Coat", sold in excess of 350,000 copies in the first seven weeks and together with his own version of "Start Movin'" at number 14, put his records in the Top 20 of the UK Singles Chart twice in the same year, securing his name in the Guinness Book of Records. His recording of "Stairway of Love" in 1958 remained in the chart for eight weeks. He toured Britain, was one of the first to appear in the BBC Television's first pop show, Six-Five Special in April 1957, and appeared in a film, The Golden Disc (1958).

After being arrested for public drunkenness and breaking a shop window in 1958, and ripping out a telephone box from the wall whilst claiming his passionate love for Edna Savage, Dene was branded as a 'bad apple' and the exemplifier of the 'evil of rock and roll' by the press. In 1958, national service was still required of all young men in the UK, and Dene was conscripted into the Army. He was originally expected to report to Winchester Barracks, where he was due to join the King's Royal Rifle Corps on 7 July 1958, but his call-up was initially deferred until contractual commitments had been completed. When he finally did go in, it was so badly handled by the press (who filmed and publicised his arrival at the barracks) that after two months Dene had to be discharged on psychological grounds as his mental health had deteriorated considerably. By that time the press had almost ruined his career, and the Army offered him a pension as a form of compensation which Dene refused. Dene later joined Larry Parnes' stable of stars and toured with them around Britain.

Disheartened by the bad publicity in 1964, Dene turned his back on the British pop scene and became an Evangelist, crossing over to singing and writing spiritual and gospel music, recording three gospel albums. He travelled abroad as an itinerant preacher, playing in churches, prisons and other venues, and preached in the Scandinavian Lutheran Church for five years in Sweden where he married for the second time. Two of the gospel albums were released in 1972–73 on Pilgrim Records.

In 1974, Dene released a book and album, both entitled I Thought Terry Dene Was Dead, and around 1984 reformed his group, the Dene Aces, with Brian Gregg. He released an album, The Real Terry Dene, in 1997 which was voted as one of the top forty best listening CDs, and has continued to appear in rock and roll shows. A Decca compilation was released in December 2004 by Vocalion Records.

In October 2007, Dene created his own company and label with his partner, Countess Lucia Liberati, named LLTD.COM, and in December 2012, released a new CD, The Best of Terry Dene, featuring a compilation of 12 tracks of his own choice, including his own version of "Mystery Train", and a remix of "C'min and Be Loved, So Long", which was written by Dene. In 2014, the name of the company was changed to LLibera.com Limited. They created the Official Terry Dene YouTube channel: from 2018, the project aimed to release a video for each one of Dene's tracks, new and old. Their first video, "Terry Dene - Fever - The Video 2018" was produced and released on 14 December 2018, and featured an original cover of "Fever", recorded by Dene in the early 1960s and the performance of Fiammetta Orsini.

== Personal life ==
Dene married fellow pop singer Edna Savage in 1958. They later divorced.

He married and divorced another three times, including to Evelyn Patrick (formerly the wife of Phil Silvers), to whom he was wed from 1967 to 1970.

Dene subsequently settled with an Italian countess, Lucia Liberati, whom he met in London in 2000.

== More recent appearances ==
Dene appeared on Juke Box Heroes in 2011, broadcast by BBC One, in a condensed biopic of his life. He played in September 2004 at the Rock 'n' Roll Weekend Festival in Chippenham, alongside Little Richard, the Comets, and Charlie Gracie. In February 2005, Dene appeared in the Best of British magazine dedicated to British music, and on 2 November 2006, as a 'mystery guest' on series 19, episode 2 of Never Mind the Buzzcocks.

He performed at the 100 Club in London in October 2007, January 2008 and January 2010, in commemoration of the first Six-Five Special, where he was a regular guest. Dene also performed on 29 February 2008 at Borough Green Rock 'n' Roll Club, backed by Dave Briggs' New Ravens, and appeared in Pop Britannia, broadcast by BBC Four.

Dene featured in the archival British Music Experience, which was first exhibited at the O2 Arena in Greenwich starting in 2009.

== Singles & Selected Releases ==
Year	Title	UK	Label
1957	"A White Sport Coat" / "The Man in the Phone Booth"	18	Decca
1957	"Start Movin'" / "Green Corn"	15	Decca
1957	"Come and Get It" / Teenage Dream"	-	Decca
1957	"Lucky Lucky Bobby" / "Baby She's Gone"	-	Decca
1958	"The Golden Age" / "C'min and Be Loved"	-	Decca
1958	"Stairway of Love" / "Lover Lover!"	16	Decca
1958	"Seven Steps to Love" / "Can I Walk You Home"	-	Decca
1958	"Who Baby Who" / "Pretty Little Pearly"	-	Decca
1959	"I've Got a Good Thing Going" / "Bimbombey"	-	Decca
1959	"There's No Fool Like a Young Fool" / "I've Come of Age"	-	Decca
1959	"Thank You Pretty Baby" / "A Boy Without a Girl"	-	Decca
1960	"Geraldine" / "Love Me or Leave Me"	-	Decca
1961	"Like a Baby" / "Next Stop Paradise"	-	Oriole
1962	"The Feminine Look" / "Fever"	-	Aral
1984	"The Real Terry Dene"	-	Rollercoaster Records
1998	"Good Rockin' Tonight"	-	Rollercoaster Records ROLL2018 (10-inch LP record)
2004	"Terry Dene"	-	Vocalion
2007	"Mystery Train"	-	LLTD.COM
2018	"Terry Dene - Fever - The Video 2018"	-	LLibera.com Limited
