= Vince Eager =

English pop singer (born 1940)

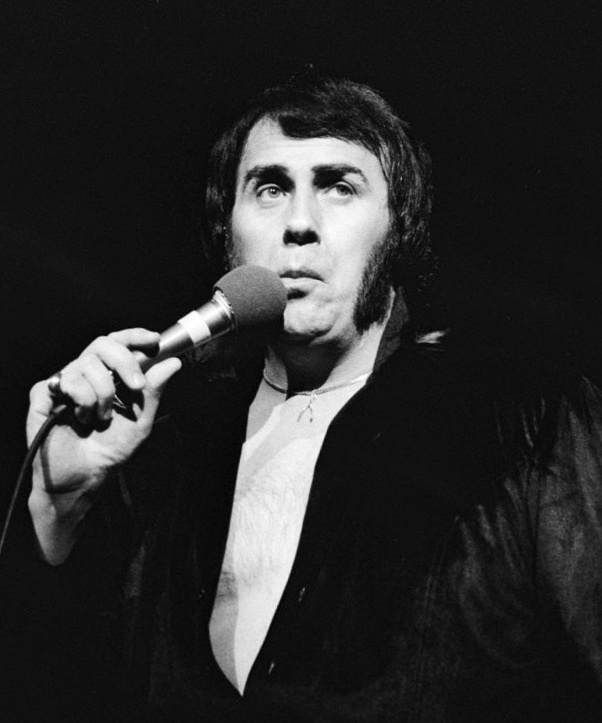
- Vince Eager in 1980

Background information
- Born: Roy Taylor; 4 June 1940 (age 86); Grantham, Lincolnshire, England
- Genres: Rock and roll, pop
- Occupations: Singer-songwriter, musician
- Instruments: Vocals, guitar
- Years active: 1958–present
- Labels: Decca; Parlophone; Top Rank; Pye; Avenue; Nevis; Charley Farley; Rollercoaster; Pink 'n' Black; Western Star

Vince Eager (born Roy Taylor; 4 June 1940) is an English pop musician. He was widely promoted by impresario Larry Parnes, but later quarrelled with him over his commercialising of Eddie Cochran's early death. Eager has since appeared in cabaret and on the West End stage.

== Early life and career ==
Eager was born in Grantham, Lincolnshire. As a teenager, he formed the Harmonica Vagabonds, later the Vagabonds Skiffle Group, with Roy Clark, Mick Fretwell, and bassist Brian Locking. The group reached the final round of a televised "World Skiffle Championship" in 1958, and were offered a residency at the 2 I's Coffee Bar in London. There, they were signed by impresario Larry Parnes, who took Taylor into his stable of performers, and gave him one of his characteristic stage names, Vince Eager. After touring and releasing an EP as Vince Eager & the Vagabonds, Clark and Fretwell returned home. Vince Eager and Brian Locking remained in London, Locking performing with Marty Wilde before joining the Shadows.

== Larry Parnes era ==
During 1959, Vince Eager was a regular on BBC TV's Drumbeat, often accompanied by the John Barry Seven. In 1960 he was one of the contestants on A Song for Europe. In the semi-final, his song, "Teenage Tears", was ranked last out of six entries for nomination to the Eurovision Song Contest. According to Vince Eager's website, "the death of his best friend Eddie Cochran in a car crash on Easter Sunday 1960 was to prove a turning point in Vince's career. He was disgusted with the manner in which Parnes sought to gain publicity from the accident and he began the process of getting away from the "Parnes Stable" of popsters".

== Later career ==
In the years that followed the Parnes era, he toured on the cabaret circuit, and performed in theatre and pantomime. For five years he starred in the West End musical Elvis. In 1986, he moved to Fort Lauderdale, Florida, United States, where he worked as a cruise director on American luxury cruise ships.

Now residing back in the UK, Eager's career has had something of a resurgence. Teaming up with producer and musician Alan Wilson, there have been new recordings some of which have featured Eager's old friends including; Marty Wilde, Albert Lee and Chas Hodges. The resulting album release, titled 788 years of Rock n Roll sold well enough for Wilson's Western Star record label to invite Eager back for another session in 2013. The latest album, Rockabilly Dinosaur was released in 2014. Eager now lives in Nottinghamshire.

In 2018, he featured on the track "Halfway to Paradise" on the newly released Billy Fury album The Symphonic Sound of Fury.

== Discography ==
=== Singles ===
- "Five Days" b/w "No More", Parlophone, 1958
- "Railroad Song" b/w "When Is Your Birthday Baby", Parlophone, 1958
- "No Other Arms No Other Lips" b/w "This Should Go on Forever", Parlophone, 1958
- "Why" b/w "El Paso", Top Rank, 1959
- "The World's Loneliest Man" b/w "Created in a Dream", Top Rank, 1960
- "Makin' Love" b/w "Primrose Lane", Top Rank, 1960
- "I Wanna Love My Life Away" b/w "I Know What I Want", Top Rank, 1961
- "Lonely Blue Boy" b/w "No Love Have I", Top Rank, 1961
- "Anytime Is The Right Time" b/w "Heavenly", Pye, 1963
- "I Shall Not Be Moved" b/w "It's Only Make Believe", Pye, 1963

=== Extended plays ===
- Vince Eager & The Vagabonds: "Soda Pop Pop": "Yea Yea" b/w "Lend Me Your Comb", "Tread Softly Stranger", "Gumdrop", Decca, 1958
- Vince Eager & The Vagabonds: Hound Dog: "Money Honey", "Be Bop A Lu La", "Cotton Fields", "My Dixie Darling", Rollercoaster, 2000

=== Studio albums ===
- Vince Eager Pays Tribute To Elvis, Avenue, 1971
- 20 Years On, Nevis, 1977
- 788 Years of Rock and Roll, Western Star Records, 2011
- Rockabilly Dinosaur, Western Star Records, 2014
- 75 Not Out, Western Star Records, 2015

=== Live albums ===
- Raised on Rock, Charley Farley, 2001

=== Compilation albums ===
- Oh Boy, Parlophone, 1958 (various artists; Vince Eager: "Buzz Buzz Buzz" and "Blue Ribbon Baby")
- Drumbeat, Parlophone, 1959 (various artists; Vince Eager: "It's Late", "This Should Go On Forever" and "It Doesn't Matter Anymore")
- British Rock 'n' Roll 1955–1960, See For Miles, 1986 (various artists – two songs by Vince Eager)
- Without You – The Songs of Billy Fury, Peaksoft, 2002 (one song by Vince Eager & Big Jim Sullivan)
- Yea Yea! It's Vince Eager!, Rollercoaster Records, 2003
- The Complete Vince Eager, Pink 'n' Black Records, 2007
- The Top Rank Story 1959, One Day Music, 2012 (various artists – one song by Vince Eager)
- The Top Rank Story 1961, One Day Music, 2012 (various artists – one song by Vince Eager)
