= Forres =

Town in Scotland

Coordinates: 57.608°N 3.620°W

Forres: Scottish Gaelic: Farrais
- Town
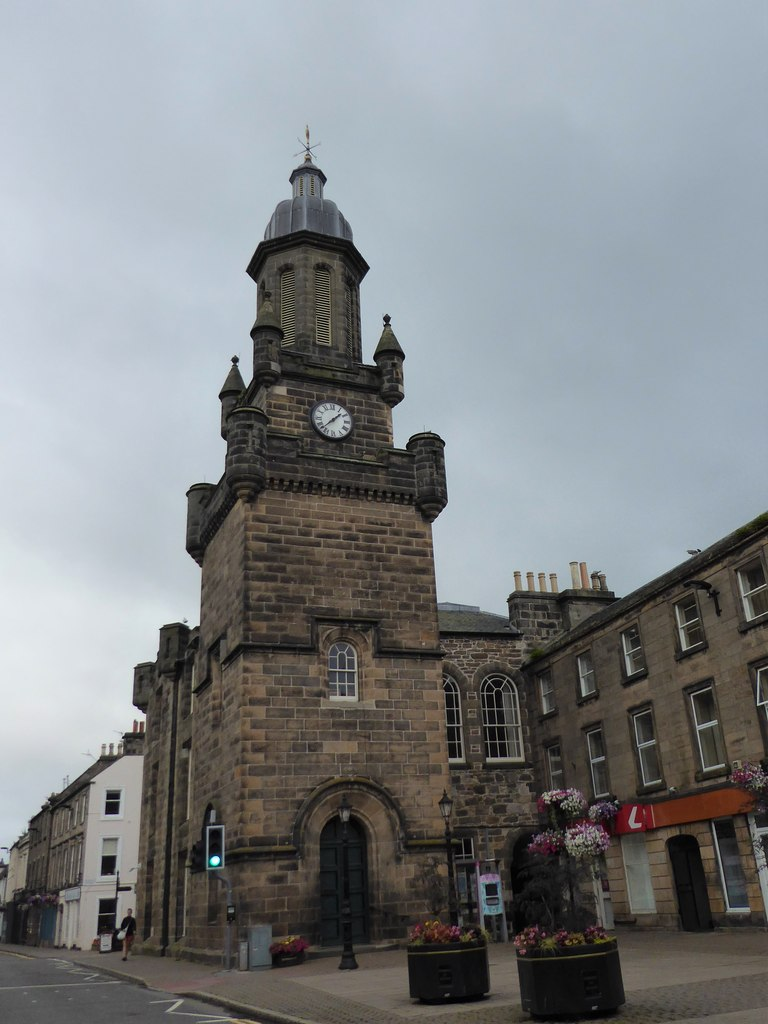
- Forres Tolbooth

- Location within Moray
- Population: 9,296 (2022)
- OS grid reference: NJ034578
  - Edinburgh: 116 mi (187 km)
  - London: 444 mi (715 km)
- Council area: Moray
- Lieutenancy area: Moray
- Country: Scotland
- Sovereign state: United Kingdom
- Post town: FORRES
- Postcode district: IV36
- Dialling code: 01309
- Police: Scotland
- Fire: Scottish
- Ambulance: Scottish
- UK Parliament: Moray West, Nairn and Strathspey
- Scottish Parliament: Moray

Forres, (/ˈfɒrɪs/; Scottish Gaelic: Farrais) is a historical market town and former royal burgh in the north of Scotland on the Moray coast, approximately 25 miles (40 km) northeast of Inverness and 12 miles (19 km) west of Elgin. Forres has been a winner of the Scotland in Bloom award on several occasions. There are many geographical and historical attractions nearby such as the River Findhorn, and there are also classical, historical artifacts and monuments within the town itself, such as Forres Tolbooth and Nelson's Tower. Brodie Castle, the home of the Brodie Clan, lies to the west of the town, close to the A96.

== Pre-history and archaeology ==
Between 2002 and 2013 some 70 hectares of land was investigated by archaeologists in advance of a proposed residential development on the southern fringes of the town. They found an extensive Iron Age settlement and evidence that people lived in the area from the Neolithic (radiocarbon dates from the 4th to the mid-3rd millennium BC were found) to the Early Historic period (they found radiocarbon dates from the 9th–12th centuries AD, around the time that historical records began). The Iron Age settlement had a souterrain and metalworking furnaces, and they found Neolithic and Bronze Age ceramics and cup-marked rock art. The excavation of a souterrain in Moray is quite rare; only one other souterrain had been excavated in Moray before this one.

== History ==
The town is the location of Sueno's Stone, an enormous carved stone probably created by Picts to commemorate a battle against Norse invaders. The stele is 20 feet (6.1 m) tall and encased in glass structure to protect it from the elements and graffiti. Sueno's Stone translates to Sven's Stone. It dates from AD 850 to AD 950.

A royal castle was present in the area from at least 900 AD, and around 1140 AD Forres became a royal burgh. Royal burghs were founded by the Kings of Scots of the 12th century to encourage trade and economic improvement. The local abbey was plundered by the Wolf of Badenoch in 1390.

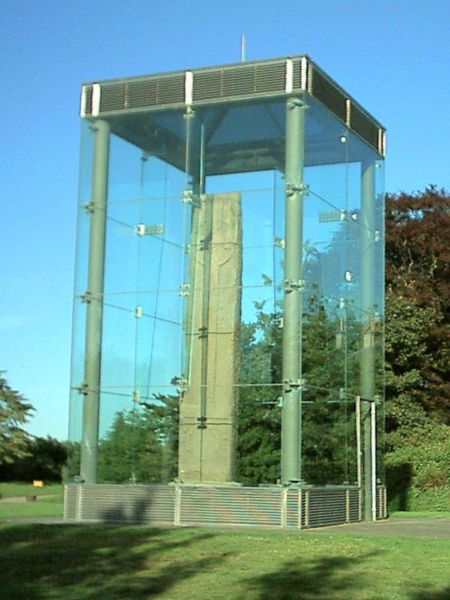
Sueno's Stone in Forres

On 23 June 1496 King James IV of Scotland issued a Royal Charter laying down the rights and privileges that the town's people are believed to have held by an earlier charter since the reign of King David I some 300 years earlier.

Brodie Castle, which was commissioned by Brodie family in 1567, lies to the west of the town.

William Shakespeare's play Macbeth, first performed in 1606, locates Duncan's castle in Forres, and the Three Witches meet on moorland near the town in the third scene of the drama.

The Dallas Dhu distillery, established in 1898, lies just south of the town; although no longer producing, the distillery is maintained in working order by Historic Environment Scotland. Benromach Distillery, also established in 1898, is located just north of the Forres bypass and is an active distillery with a visitors' centre.

The Findhorn Foundation, an intentional community, was established in the town in the 1940s. The former RAF Forres, established during the Second World War, is located nearby.

In January 2016, Glasgow School of Art established a campus in the town which focuses on design and innovation.

== Demography ==
The population in 1841 was 2,844 inhabitants. It grew in the 20th century, and would later have a population of 9,296 in the 2022 Scottish census.

== Geography and economy ==
Sitting between the floodplain of the River Findhorn and the wooded slopes of Cluny and Sanquhar Hills, Forres is well known for its award-winning floral sculptures.

== Parliamentary burgh ==
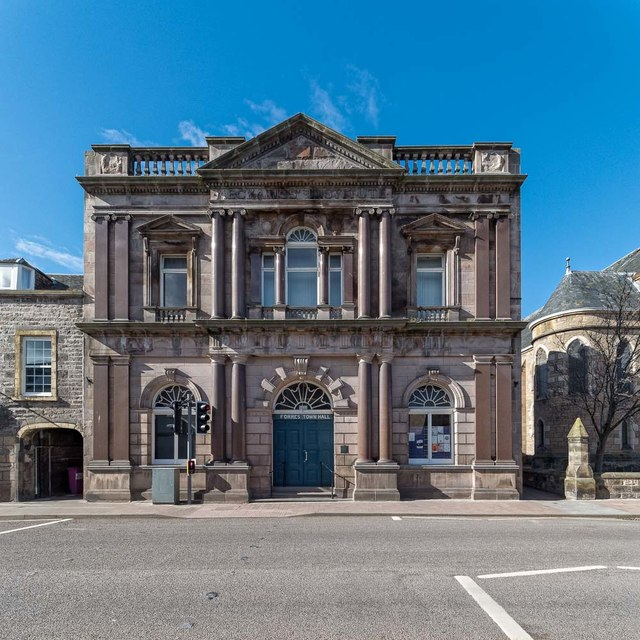
Forres Town Hall

Forres was a parliamentary burgh, combined with Inverness, Fortrose and Nairn, in the Inverness Burghs constituency of the House of Commons of the Parliament of Great Britain from 1708 to 1801 and of the Parliament of the United Kingdom from 1801 to 1918. The constituency was abolished in 1918 and the Forres and Nairn components were merged into the then new constituency of Moray and Nairn. Forres Town Hall, originally built as a masonic hall and later used as a mechanics institute before becoming a municipal building, was completed in 1829.

== Notable residents ==
- Frank Fraser Darling (1903 - 1979), an English ecologist, ornithologist, farmer, conservationist and author. He gives his name to the Fraser Darling effect.
- Hugh Falconer (1808–1865), Scottish geologist, botanist, palaeontologist, and paleoanthropologist
- John Gordon (1786–1818) anatomist born in Forres
- Sir Alexander Grant, 1st Baronet (1864 - 1937), a Scottish businessman, biscuit manufacturer and philanthropist, known as creator of Mcvities Digestive Biscuits.
- Charles Lumley (1824–1858), recipient of the Victoria Cross
- James McIntyre (1828-1906). Born in Forres, moved to Canada 1841, and to Ingersoll, 1854. Cabinetmaker and undertaker, proprietor of furniture factory and poet.
- James Scott (Liberal politician) (1876-1939), Scottish lawyer and Liberal party politician.
- Donald Smith, 1st Baron Strathcona and Mount Royal (1820–1914), Scottish-born Canadian businessman and philanthropist
- James Taylor (neurologist) (1859-1946), British neurologist who studied diseases of the nervous system.
- Roy Williamson (1936–1990), Scottish songwriter and folk musician, member of the Corries, who wrote "Flower of Scotland"
- Lorna McNee (born 1987) Michelin-starred chef and Winner of the Great British Menu.
- Marli Siu (born 1993) Actress and winner of a Scottish BAFTA.

== Climate ==
As with the rest of the British Isles and Scotland, Forres experiences a maritime climate with cool summers and mild winters. The nearest official Met Office weather station for which online records are available is Kinloss, about 3 miles (5 km) north east of the town centre. The lowest temperature to be recorded in recent years was −16.0 °C (3.2 °F) during December 2010.

The highest temperature recorded at Kinloss was 31.2 °C (88.2 °F) on 9 August 2003 and the lowest was −16.5 °C (2.3 °F) on 30 December 1995.

Climate data for Kinloss 5 m (16 ft) asl, 1991-2020, extremes 1957-present (Weather station 3 mi (5 km) NE of Forres)
Month	Jan	Feb	Mar	Apr	May	Jun	Jul	Aug	Sep	Oct	Nov	Dec	Year
Record high °C (°F)	15.6 (60.1)	16.8 (62.2)	21.7 (71.1)	24.9 (76.8)	28.3 (82.9)	28.4 (83.1)	31.0 (87.8)	31.2 (88.2)	29.3 (84.7)	24.4 (75.9)	18.9 (66.0)	16.3 (61.3)	31.2 (88.2)
Mean daily maximum °C (°F)	7.0 (44.6)	7.7 (45.9)	9.5 (49.1)	12.1 (53.8)	14.7 (58.5)	16.9 (62.4)	19.0 (66.2)	18.7 (65.7)	16.5 (61.7)	13.0 (55.4)	9.6 (49.3)	7.1 (44.8)	12.7 (54.8)
Mean daily minimum °C (°F)	0.9 (33.6)	1.0 (33.8)	2.3 (36.1)	4.0 (39.2)	6.2 (43.2)	9.2 (48.6)	11.2 (52.2)	10.9 (51.6)	9.0 (48.2)	6.1 (43.0)	3.2 (37.8)	0.8 (33.4)	5.4 (41.7)
Record low °C (°F)	−15.6 (3.9)	−14.4 (6.1)	−10.7 (12.7)	−7.3 (18.9)	−3.6 (25.5)	−0.5 (31.1)	1.5 (34.7)	1.3 (34.3)	−1.2 (29.8)	−4.6 (23.7)	−13.1 (8.4)	−16.5 (2.3)	−16.5 (2.3)
Average precipitation mm (inches)	49.8 (1.96)	43.0 (1.69)	39.1 (1.54)	41.8 (1.65)	50.5 (1.99)	59.4 (2.34)	61.7 (2.43)	66.9 (2.63)	66.1 (2.60)	72.3 (2.85)	56.5 (2.22)	55.5 (2.19)	662.6 (26.09)
Mean monthly sunshine hours	53.4	80.7	118.9	151.4	197.8	158.6	155.0	146.2	123.6	92.3	62.8	42.9	1,383.6
Source 1: Met Office
Source 2: Starlings Roost Weather

== Transport ==
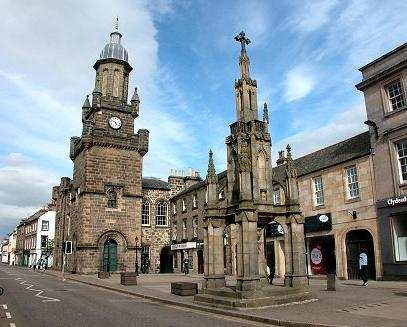
The high street of Forres, 2004

Forres is situated on the A96 trunk route connecting the cities of Aberdeen and Inverness. The River Findhorn was originally crossed by fording near Waterford Farm. A suspension bridge was opened in 1831 to cross the river at the west end of the town. This bridge was replaced by the current bridge in 1938. Due to high volumes of traffic passing through the town centre, a bypass was built in the late 1980s to reduce congestion in the town centre. A new, dual carriageway A96 bypass is planned by the Scottish Government.

Forres railway station is situated just outside the town and is operated by ScotRail. The town of Forres was once a triangular junction in the Highland Railway network, travelling through Forres was once the quickest route to reach Inverness from the south. Originally the station had four platforms; two of which were on the north side of the triangle on the route between Inverness and Aberdeen, the third on the south west side of the triangle used by services to Grantown-on-Spey. The fourth was a short platform on the south east side used by through services between Elgin and Aviemore via Grantown. Trains from Grantown towards Nairn or Inverness had to run through the station and then reverse back into the Aberdeen to Inverness platform. The service to Grantown-on-Spey was closed in the 1960s and now forms part of The Dava Way, a scenic footpath connecting the two towns.

== Education ==
- Andersons Primary School, High Street (state primary school)
- Forres Academy, Burdsyard Road (state secondary school)
- Drumduan School (private school for 5–18-year-olds)
- Applegrove Primary School, Orchard Road (state primary school)
- Pilmuir Primary School, Pilmuir Road (state primary school)

== Religion ==
A number of Christian churches have a presence in Forres, including:

Church of Scotland

- St Laurence Church, High Street
- St Leonard's Church, High Street

Scottish Episcopal Church

- St John's Church, Victoria Road

Roman Catholic Church

- St Margaret's Church, High Street

Baptist Union of Scotland

- Forres Baptist Church, Clovenside Road

== Sport ==
Forres has various sporting activities within it including Forres Golf Course, which has held the Scottish Young Professionals championships a number of times.

Forres Mechanics Football Club play in the Highland League at Mosset Park. They are the oldest association football club in the North of Scotland and one of only two original teams to play in the Highland League since its first season in 1893, the other being Clachnacuddin.

Forres St. Lawrence is the local cricket club. They are full members in both senior and reserve competitions in the area.

Forres Harriers is the local running club with around 80 members. The most famous Harrier is Don Ritchie who at one time held 14 world best times for ultra distance running events ranging from 50 km to 200 km.

Forres has two swimming clubs - the long established Forres Bluefins, as well as the UK's only specialist sprint swimming club, Free Style SC.

Forres hosted the first race of the World Orienteering Championships 2015 on Friday 31 July, when the Sprint Qualification event was held there. Two days later on 2 August it hosted the Sprint Final event.

== Town twinning ==
Forres is twinned with:

- Mount Dora, Florida, United States
- Vienenburg, Germany
