= Duffy Power =

English blues and rock and roll singer (1941–2014)

- Born: Raymond Leslie Howard; 9 September 1941; Fulham, London, England
- Died: 19 February 2014 (aged 72)
- Genres: Blues, rock and roll
- Occupation: Singer
- Years active: 1959–2014

Duffy Power (born Raymond Leslie Howard; 9 September 1941 – 19 February 2014) was an English blues and rock and roll singer, who achieved some success in the 1960s and continued to perform and record intermittently later.

== Career ==
Ray Howard was born in Fulham, South West London. He was discovered in 1959 by impresario Larry Parnes, singing at a talent show with his group Duffy and the Dreamers. He was renamed Duffy Power in the style of Parnes' other discoveries, such as Billy Fury, Marty Wilde, Vince Eager and Georgie Fame. He recorded a series of cover versions of such songs as "Dream Lover" and "Ain't She Sweet" as singles for the Fontana label over the next two years, but unlike some of his stablemates failed to achieve commercial success.

In 1960, he featured in Daniel Farson's Living for Kicks documentary.

He left Parnes in 1961, suffering from depression. However, he was introduced by a friend to the growing London blues club scene, and in 1963 teamed up with Graham Bond, Jack Bruce, Ginger Baker and John McLaughlin to record "I Saw Her Standing There", one of the first cover versions of a Beatles song. He continued to record for Parlophone through the 1960s, both as a solo artist, often backed by top session musicians such as Binky McKenzie, and with Alexis Korner's Blues Incorporated, but the critical acclaim for his performances failed to be matched by sales. He sometimes performed and recorded, with other musicians, under the name Duffy's Nucleus.

Power also worked as a session musician, and played on the soundtrack of the 1969 film, The Italian Job. An album of tracks recorded in 1969 and produced by Peter Eden was issued on the Spark label whilst in 1971 tracks recorded between 1965 and 1967 were released on Transatlantic as Innovations. In 1972, he finally released a solo album, Duffy Power, on the GSF label (GSF 502), produced in conjunction with Andrew Loog Oldham and featuring Korner, Dana Gillespie and others. Although by this time he was widely recognised as an impressive singer, his albums still failed to sell. His personal life was aggravated by depression and drug use and he succumbed to mental illness, curtailing regular performances.

Most of his Parlophone material including unreleased recordings from the 1960s were issued on CD in 2002 as Leapers and Sleepers. In 2006 saw a further retrospective Vampers and Champers that included the re-release of his Translantic LP Innovations.

Power died on 19 February 2014 at the age of 72.

== Bibliography ==
- Bane, M., (1982) White boy singin' the blues, London: Penguin, 1982, ISBN 0-14-006045-6.
- Bob Brunning, Blues: The British Connection, Helter Skelter Publishing, London, 2002, ISBN 1-900924-41-2 – First edition 1986 – Second edition 1995 Blues in Britain
- Bob Brunning, The Fleetwood Mac Story: Rumours and Lies, Omnibus Press, London, 1990 and 1998, ISBN 0-7119-6907-8
- Martin Celmins, Peter Green – Founder of Fleetwood Mac, Sanctuary London, 1995, foreword by B. B. King, ISBN 1-86074-233-5
- Fancourt, L., (1989) British blues on record (1957–1970), Retrack Books.
- Dick Heckstall-Smith, The safest place in the world: A personal history of British rhythm and blues, 1989, Quartet Books Limited, ISBN 0-7043-2696-5 – Second Edition : Blowing The Blues – Fifty Years Playing The British Blues, 2004, Clear Books, ISBN 1-904555-04-7
- Christopher Hjort, Strange brew: Eric Clapton and the British blues boom, 1965-1970, foreword by John Mayall, Jawbone, 2007, ISBN 1-906002-00-2
- Paul Myers, Long John Baldry and the Birth of the British Blues, Vancouver 2007, GreyStone Books, ISBN 1-55365-200-2
- Harry Shapiro Alexis Korner: The Biography, Bloomsbury Publishing PLC, London, 1997, Discography by Mark Troster, ISBN 0-7475-3163-3
- Schwartz, R. F., (2007) How Britain got the blues : The transmission and reception of American blues style in the United Kingdom, Ashgate, ISBN 0-7546-5580-6
- Mike Vernon, The Blue Horizon Story 1965-1970 Vol.1, notes of the booklet of the box set (60 pages)
