= Guided by Voices discography =

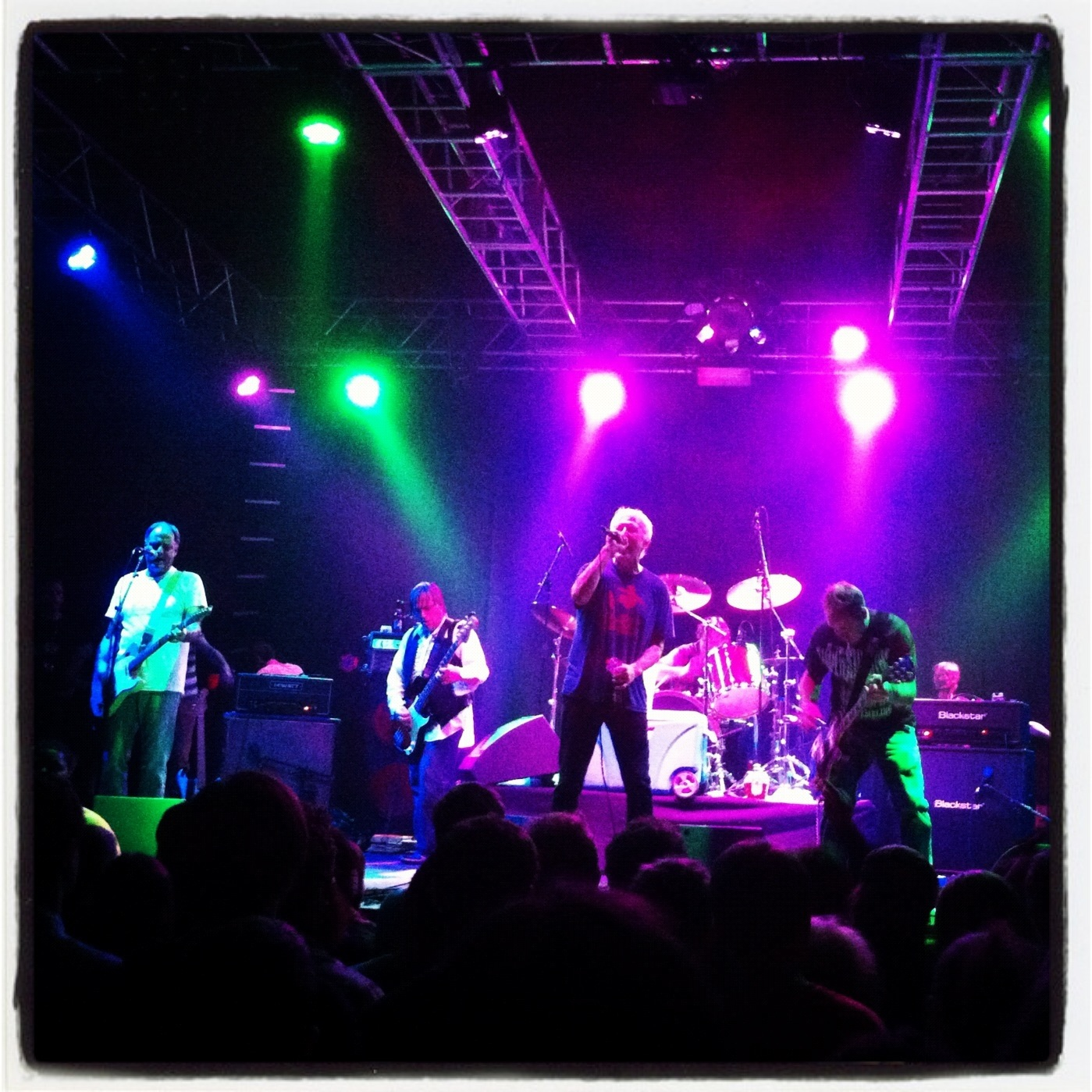
- Guided by Voices performing in 2012
- Studio albums: 42
- Extended plays: 19
- Soundtrack albums: 7
- Live albums: 3
- Compilation albums: 12
- Singles: 39
- Video albums: 7
- Box sets: 6
- Books: 2

The Guided by Voices discography includes dozens of releases, both official and unofficial. Robert Pollard, the main creative force behind the band, is a prolific songwriter, having written or co-written more than 1,600 songs, with over 500 of them released under the Guided by Voices moniker.

In addition to official Guided by Voices albums, there have been numerous official singles, extended plays, split releases and compilations, as well as four box-sets of previously unreleased material known as "Suitcases" that each contain four CDs with twenty-five tracks each, for a total of 100 songs per release.

== Studio albums ==
Year	Number	Album details	Peak chart positions		
Year	Number	Album details	US	US Heat.	US Indie
1987	1	Devil Between My Toes: Released: February 15, 1987; Label: Schwa (GBV0001); Format: LP	—	—	—
1987	2	Sandbox: Released: 1987; Label: Halo (#1); Format: LP	—	—	—
1989	3	Self-Inflicted Aerial Nostalgia: Released: 1989; Label: Halo (#2); Format: LP	—	—	—
1990	4	Same Place the Fly Got Smashed: Released: 1990; Label: Rocket #9 (OX846); Format: LP	—	—	—
1992	5	Propeller: Released: 1992; Label: Rockathon (#001); Format: LP	—	—	—
1993	6	Vampire on Titus: Released: 1993; Label: Scat (#31); Format: LP	—	—	—
1994	7	Bee Thousand: Released: June 21, 1994; Label: Scat Records (#35); Format: LP, Cassette, CD	—	—	—
1995	8	Alien Lanes: Released: April 4, 1995; Label: Matador (OLE 123); Format: LP, Cassette, CD	—	—	—
1996	9	Under the Bushes Under the Stars: Released: March 26, 1996; Label: Matador (OLE 161); Format: LP + 12-inch, Cassette, CD	—	19	—
1996	10	Tonics & Twisted Chasers: Released: 1996; Label: Rockathon (#002); Format: LP	—	—	—
1997	11	Mag Earwhig!: Released: May 20, 1997; Label: Matador (OLE 241); Format: LP, Cassette, CD	—	19	—
1999	12	Do the Collapse: Released: August 3, 1999; Label: TVT (TVT-1980); Format: LP, Cassette, CD	—	14	—
2001	13	Isolation Drills: Released: April 10, 2001; Label: TVT (TVT 2160); Format: LP, CD	168	8	6
2002	14	Universal Truths and Cycles: Released: June 18, 2002; Label: Matador (OLE 547); Format: LP, CD	160	3	10
2003	15	Earthquake Glue: Released: August 19, 2003; Label: Matador (OLE 574); Format: LP, CD	193	12	8
2004	16	Half Smiles of the Decomposed: Released: August 24, 2004; Label: Matador (OLE 612); Format: LP, CD	—	16	22
2012	17	Let's Go Eat the Factory: Released: January 1, 2012; Label: Guided by Voices Inc. (GBVI-16), Fire Records (FIRECD/LP248); Format: LP, CD, Cassette	—	8	35
2012	18	Class Clown Spots a UFO: Released: June 11, 2012; Label: Guided by Voices Inc. (GBVI-22), Fire Records (FIRECD/LP249); Format: LP, CD, Cassette	—	12	—
2012	19	The Bears for Lunch: Released: November 13, 2012; Label: Guided by Voices Inc. (GBVI-27), Fire Records (FIRECD/LP259); Format: LP, CD, Cassette	—	9	—
2013	20	English Little League: Released: April 30, 2013; Label: Guided by Voices Inc. (GBVI-34), Fire Records (FIRECD/LP294); Format: LP, CD, Cassette	—	21	—
2014	21	Motivational Jumpsuit: Released: February 18, 2014; Label: Guided by Voices Inc. (GBVI-45), Fire Records (FIRECD/LP337); Format: LP, CD, Cassette	—	18	—
2014	22	Cool Planet: Released: May 13, 2014; Label: Guided by Voices Inc. (GBVI-50), Fire Records (FIRECD/LP355); Format: LP, CD, Cassette	—	20	—
2016	23	Please Be Honest: Released: April 22, 2016; Label: Guided by Voices Inc.; Format: LP, CD	—	—	—
2017	24	August by Cake: Released: April 7, 2017; Label: Guided by Voices Inc.; Format: 2-LP, CD	—	22	—
2017	25	How Do You Spell Heaven: Released: August 11, 2017; Label: Guided by Voices Inc.; Format: LP, CD	—	20	37
2018	26	Space Gun: Released: March 23, 2018; Label: Guided by Voices Inc.; Format: LP, CD	—	—	—
2019	27	Zeppelin Over China: Released: February 1, 2019; Label: Guided by Voices Inc.; Format: 2-LP, CD	—	—	—
2019	28	Warp and Woof: Released: April 26, 2019; Label: Guided by Voices Inc.; Format: LP, CD	—	—	—
2019	29	Sweating the Plague: Released: October 25, 2019; Label: Guided by Voices Inc.; Format: LP, CD	—	—	—
2020	30	Surrender Your Poppy Field: Released: February 20, 2020; Label: Guided by Voices Inc.; Format: LP, CD	—	—	—
2020	31	Mirrored Aztec: Released: August 21, 2020; Label: Guided by Voices Inc.; Format: LP, CD	—	—	—
2020	32	Styles We Paid For: Released: December 11, 2020; Label: Guided by Voices Inc.; Format: LP, CD	—	—	—
2021	33	Earth Man Blues: Released: April 30, 2021; Label: Guided by Voices Inc.; Format: LP, CD	—	—	—
2021	34	It's Not Them. It Couldn't Be Them. It Is Them!: Released: October 22, 2021; Label: Guided by Voices Inc.; Format: LP, CD	—	—	—
2022	35	Crystal Nuns Cathedral: Released: March 4, 2022; Label: Guided by Voices Inc.; Format: LP, CD	—	—	—
2022	36	Tremblers and Goggles by Rank: Released: July 1, 2022; Label: Guided by Voices Inc.; Format: LP, CD	—	—	—
2023	37	La La Land: Released: January 20, 2023; Label: Guided by Voices Inc.; Format: LP, CD	—	—	—
2023	38	Welshpool Frillies: Released: July 21, 2023; Label: Guided by Voices Inc.; Format: LP, CD	—	—	—
2023	39	Nowhere to Go but Up: Released: November 24, 2023; Label: Guided by Voices Inc.; Format: LP, CD	—	—	—
2024	40	Strut of Kings: Released: June 28, 2024; Label: Guided by Voices Inc./Rockathon; Format: LP, CD	—	—	—
2025	41	Universe Room: Released: February 7, 2025; Label: Guided by Voices Inc./Rockathon; Format: LP, CD	—	—	—
2025	42	Thick, Rich & Delicious: Released: October 31, 2025; Label: Guided by Voices Inc./Rockathon; Format: LP, CD	—	—	—
2026	43	Crawlspace of the Pantheon: Released: May 29, 2026; Label: Guided by Voices Inc.	—	—	—
2027	44	Speculation and Gossip: Scheduled: January 22, 2027; Label: Guided by Voices Inc.	—	—	—

== Extended plays ==
Year	EP details
1986	Forever Since Breakfast: Released: 1986; Label: I Wanna (605058X); Format: 12-inch EP
1993	The Grand Hour: Released: 1993; Label: Scat (#28); Format: 7-inch EP
1993	Static Airplane Jive: Released: 1993; Label: City Slang (04939-7); Format: 7-inch EP
1994	Get Out of My Stations: Released: 1994; Label: Siltbreeze (SB 028); Format: 7-inch EP
1994	Fast Japanese Spin Cycle: Released: 1994; Label: Engine (VROOM-07); Format: 7-inch EP, CD
1994	Clown Prince of the Menthol Trailer: Released: 1994; Label: Domino (RUG 11); Format: 7-inch EP, CD
1994	I Am a Scientist: Released: October 15, 1994; Label: Scat (#38); Format: 7-inch EP, CD
1995	Tigerbomb: Released: November 14, 1995; Label: Matador (OLE 168-7); Format: 7-inch EP
1996	Sunfish Holy Breakfast: Released: November 19, 1996; Label: Matador (OLE 185); Format: 12-inch EP, CD
1996	Plantations of Pale Pink: Released: November 19, 1996; Label: Matador (OLE 208-7); Format: 7-inch EP
1997	Wish in One Hand…: Released: 1997; Label: Jass (J001); Format: 7-inch EP
1999	Plugs for the Program: Released: December 3, 1999; Label: TVT (TVT 1983-2); Format: CD
2000	Hold on Hope: Released: March 7, 2000; Label: TVT (TVT 1985-2); Format: CD
2000	Dayton, Ohio – 19 Something and 5: Released: April 2, 2000; Label: Fading Captain Series (#5); Format: 7-inch EP
2001	Daredevil Stamp Collector: Do The Collapse B-sides: Released: March 30, 2001; Label: Fading Captain Series (#10); Format: 12-inch EP
2002	The Pipe Dreams of Instant Prince Whippet: Released: September 17, 2002; Label: Fading Captain Series (#24); Format: 12-inch EP, CD
2013	Down by the Racetrack: Released: January 22, 2013; Label: Guided by Voices Inc. (GBVI-28); Format: 7-inch EP, CD
2018	Wine Cork Stonehenge: Released: December 7, 2018; Label: Guided by Voices Inc.; Format: 7-inch EP
2018	100 Dougs: Released: December 7, 2018; Label: Guided by Voices Inc.; Format: 7-inch EP
2019	1901 Acid Rock: Released: March 29, 2019; Label: Guided by Voices Inc.; Format: 7-inch EP
2019	Umlaut Over the Ozone: Released: March 29, 2019; Label: Guided by Voices Inc.; Format: 7-inch EP

=== Split EPs ===
Year	Split Details	Songs
1996	Superchunk/Guided by Voices: Released: 1996 (Australia); Label: Fellaheen (JACK 046-2); Format: CD; Total length: 16:06	1. Superchunk – "A Small Definition" – 4:01; 2. Superchunk – "Her Royal Fisticuffs" – 3:37; 3. Superchunk – "The Mine Has Been Returned to the Original Owner" – 3:27; 4. Guided by Voices – "Delayed Reaction Brats" – 1:07; 5. Guided by Voices – "He's the Uncle" – 1:38; 6. Guided by Voices – "Key Losers" – 2:16
1997	8 Rounds: GVSB vs GBV: Released: July 1, 1997; Label: Radiopaque Recordings (RR013); Format: CD; Total length: 24:19	1. Girls Against Boys – "Learned It" – 3:42; 2. Girls Against Boys – "Vera Cruz" – 4:31; 3. Girls Against Boys – "Disco 666" – 2:43; 4. Girls Against Boys – "Kill the Sexplayer" – 3:55; 5. Guided by Voices – "Unleashed! The Large-Hearted Boy" [Live] – 1:58; 6. Guided by Voices – "Motor Away" [Live] – 2:22; 7. Guided by Voices – "My Valuable Hunting Knife" [Live] – 2:08; 8. Guided by Voices – "Shocker in Gloomtown/Some Drilling Implied" [Live] – 3:00
2001	Selective Service: Released: December 10, 2001; Fading Captain Series (#16); Format: CD; Total length: 28:10	1. Guided by Voices – "Dayton, Ohio–19 Something and 5" [Live] – 2:56; 2. Guided by Voices – "Travels" – 2:00; 3. Guided by Voices – "No Welcome Wagons" – 2:00; 4. Guided by Voices – "Selective Service" – 1:54; 5. Airport 5 – "Total Exposure" – 4:05; 6. Airport 5 – "Cold War Water Sports" – 3:26; 7. Airport 5 – "The Wheel Hits the Path (Quite Soon)" – 1:27; 8. Airport 5 – "Stifled Man Casino" – 3:18; 9. Airport 5 – "Peroxide" – 1:42; 10. Airport 5 – "Eskimo Clockwork" – 1:23; 11. Airport 5 – "In the Brain" [Bonus track] – 3:59

== Singles ==
Year	Song/Single Details	Album
1995	"Motor Away": Released: June 6, 1995; Label: Matador (OLE 148-7); Format: 7-inch Single	Alien Lanes
1996	"The Official Ironmen Rally Song": Released: February 27, 1996; Label: Matador (OLE 184-7/OLE 184-2); Format: 7-inch Single, CD Single	Under the Bushes Under the Stars
1996	"Cut-Out Witch": Released: June 17, 1996; Label: Matador (OLE 218-7); Format: 7-inch Single (Picture Disc)	Under the Bushes Under the Stars
1997	"Bulldog Skin": Released: May 6, 1997; Label: Matador (OLE 217-7/OLE 217-2); Format: 7-inch Single, CD Single	Mag Earwhig!
1997	"I Am a Tree": Released: July 29, 1997; Label: Matador (OLE 264-7/OLE 264-2); Format: 7-inch Single, CD Single	Mag Earwhig!
1999	"Surgical Focus": Released: June 22, 1999; Label: TVT (TVT-1981-7); Format: 7-inch Single	Do the Collapse
1999	"Teenage FBI": Released: September 28, 1999; Label: Creation (CRES 325/CRESCD 325); Format: 7-inch Single, CD Single	Do the Collapse
1999	"Hold on Hope": Released: November 1, 1999; Label: Creation (CRES 328); Format: 7-inch Single	Do the Collapse
2001	"Chasing Heather Crazy": Released: March 13, 2001; Label: TVT (2162); Format: 7-inch Single	Isolation Drills
2001	"Glad Girls": Released: July 9, 2001; Label: TVT (020412); Format: 7-inch Single	Isolation Drills
2002	"Back to the Lake": Released: May 21, 2002; Label: Fading Captain Series (#20) / Matador (OLE 564-2); Format: 7-inch Single, CD Single (released August 19, 2002)	Universal Truths and Cycles
2002	"Cheyenne": Released: May 21, 2002; Label: Fading Captain Series (#21); Format: 7-inch Single	Universal Truths and Cycles
2002	"Everywhere with Helicopter": Released: May 21, 2002; Label: Fading Captain Series (#22) / Matador (OLE 552-2); Format: 7-inch Single, CD Single (released June 3, 2002)	Universal Truths and Cycles
2002	"Universal Truths and Cycles": Released: May 21, 2002; Label: Fading Captain Series (#23); Format: 7-inch Single	Universal Truths and Cycles
2003	"My Kind of Soldier": Released: July 29, 2003; Label: Fading Captain Series (#28); Format: 7-inch Single	Earthquake Glue
2003	"The Best of Jill Hives": Released: September 23, 2003; Label: Matador (OLE 598-2); Format: CD Single	Earthquake Glue
2011	"We Won't Apologize for the Human Race" / "The Unsinkable Fats Domino": Released: November 22, 2011; Label: Matador (OLE-973-7); Format: 7-inch Single	Let's Go Eat the Factory
2011	"Doughnut for a Snowman": Released: November 28, 2011; Label: Fire (BLAZE45188); Format: 7-inch Single	Let's Go Eat the Factory
2012	"Chocolate Boy": Released: January 17, 2012; Label: Guided By Voices Inc. (GBVI-17); Format: 7-inch Single	Let's Go Eat the Factory
2012	"Keep It In Motion": Released: March 20, 2012; Label: Guided By Voices Inc. (GBVI-18), Fire (BLAZE45190); Format: 7-inch Single	Class Clown Spots a UFO
2012	"Jon The Croc": Released: April 17, 2012; Label: Guided By Voices Inc. (GBVI-20), Fire (BLAZE45191); Format: 7-inch Single	Class Clown Spots a UFO
2012	"Class Clown Spots a UFO": Released: May 15, 2012; Label: Guided By Voices Inc. (GBVI-21), Fire (BLAZE45192); Format: 7-inch Single	Class Clown Spots a UFO
2012	"White Flag": Released: October 29, 2012; Label: Guided By Voices Inc. (GBVI-24), Fire (BLAZE45203); Format: 7-inch Single	The Bears for Lunch
2012	"Everywhere is Miles From Everywhere": Released: October 29, 2012; Label: Guided By Voices Inc. (GBVI-25), Fire (BLAZE45202); Format: 7-inch Single	The Bears for Lunch
2012	"Hangover Child": Released: October 29, 2012; Label: Guided By Voices Inc. (GBVI-26), Fire (BLAZE45201); Format: 7-inch Single	The Bears for Lunch
2013	"Flunky Minnows": Released: February 19, 2013; Label: Guided By Voices Inc. (GBVI-29); Format: 7-inch Single	English Little League
2013	"Islands (She Talks In Rainbows)": Released: March 5, 2013; Label: Guided By Voices Inc. (GBVI-30); Format: 7-inch Single	English Little League
2013	"Trash Can Full Of Nails": Released: March 19, 2013; Label: Guided By Voices Inc. (GBVI-31); Format: 7-inch Single	English Little League
2013	"Xeno Pariah": Released: April 2, 2013; Label: Guided By Voices Inc. (GBVI-32); Format: 7-inch Single	English Little League
2013	"Noble Insect": Released: April 16, 2013; Label: Guided By Voices Inc. (GBVI-33); Format: 7-inch Single	English Little League
2014	"Save The Company": Released: January 21, 2014; Label: Guided By Voices Inc. (GBVI-40); Format: 7-inch Single	Motivational Jumpsuit
2014	"Vote For Me Dummy": Released: January 21, 2014; Label: Guided By Voices Inc. (GBVI-41); Format: 7-inch Single	Motivational Jumpsuit
2014	"Alex And The Omegas": Released: January 21, 2014; Label: Guided By Voices Inc. (GBVI-42); Format: 7-inch Single	Motivational Jumpsuit
2014	"The Littlest League Possible" / "Jupiter Spin": Released: January 21, 2014; Label: Guided By Voices Inc. (GBVI-43); Format: 7-inch Single	Motivational Jumpsuit
2014	"Planet Score" / "Zero Elasticity": Released: January 21, 2014; Label: Guided By Voices Inc. (GBVI-44); Format: 7-inch Single	Motivational Jumpsuit
2014	"Authoritarian Zoo": Released: April 29, 2014; Label: Guided By Voices Inc. (GBVI-46); Format: 7-inch Single	Cool Planet
2014	"Males Of Wormwood Mars": Released: April 29, 2014; Label: Guided By Voices Inc. (GBVI-47); Format: 7-inch Single	Cool Planet
2014	"Table At Fool’s Tooth": Released: April 29, 2014; Label: Guided By Voices Inc. (GBVI-48); Format: 7-inch Single	Cool Planet
2014	"All American Boy": Released: April 29, 2014; Label: Guided By Voices Inc. (GBVI-49); Format: 7-inch Single	Cool Planet

=== Split singles ===
Year	Split Details	Songs
1993	GBV / Jenny Mae Leffel: Released: 1993; Label: Anyway (ANYWAY 013); Format: 7-inch Single	A1: Guided by Voices – "If We Wait" (Robert Pollard); B1: Jenny Mae Leffel – "Red Chair"
1994	GBV / Grifters: Released: 1994; Label: Now Sound (NOW #2); Format: 7-inch Single	A1: Guided by Voices – "Hey Mr. Soundman" (R. Pollard, Tobin Sprout); A2: Guided by Voices – "Announcers and Umpires" (R. Pollard); A3: Guided by Voices – "Evil Speaker B" (Jim Pollard); A4: Guided by Voices – "Uncle Dave" (R. Pollard); B1: Grifters – "I'm Drunk" (Grifters)
1994	GBV / Belreve: Released: 1994; Label: Anyway (ANYWAY 021); Format: 7-inch Single	A1: Belreve – "The Sulk King"; B1: Guided by Voices – "Always Crush Me" (R. Pollard)
1995	GBV / New Radiant Storm King: Released: 1995; Label: Chunk (CH4520); Format: 7-inch Single	A1: Guided by Voices – "The Opposing Engineer (Sleeps Alone)" (New Radiant Storm King); B1: New Radiant Storm King – "I Am a Scientist" (R. Pollard)
1997	GBV / Cobra Verde: Released: March 10, 1997; Label: Wabana (ORE 10); Format: 7-inch Single	A1: Guided by Voices – "Aim Correctly" (R. Pollard); A2: Guided by Voices – "Orange Jacket" (R. Pollard); B1: Cobra Verde – "Terrorist"
2002	GBV / Sin Sin 77: Released: 2002; Label: Devil in the Woods (#53); Format: 7-inch Single	A1: Guided by Voices – "Cheyenne" [Live] (R. Pollard); B1: Sin Sin 77 – "Radio"

== Live albums ==
Year	Album details
2007	Live from Austin, TX: Released: May 15, 2007; Label: New West; Format: 2 CDs
2018	Ogre's Trumpet: Released: March 9, 2018; Label: Guided By Voices Inc.; Format: 2×LP, CD
2025	Goodnight El Dorado: Released: July 11, 2025; Label: Rockathon; Format: LP, Digital Download

== Box sets ==
Year	Album details
1995	Box: Released: February 28, 1995; Label: Scat (#40); Format: 6 LPs, 5 CDs
2000	Suitcase: Failed Experiments and Trashed Aircraft: Released: October 17, 2000; Label: Fading Captain Series (#6); Format: 4 CDs
2003	Hardcore UFOs: Revelations, Epiphanies and Fast Food in the Western Hemisphere: Released: November 4, 2003; Label: Matador (OLE 550); Format: 5 CDs + 1 DVD
2005	Suitcase 2: American Superdream Wow: Released: October 4, 2005; Label: Fading Captain Series (#37); Format: 4 CDs
2009	Suitcase 3: Up We Go Now: Released November 3, 2009; Label: Guided By Voices Inc. (GBVI-8); Format: 4 CDs
2015	Suitcase 4: Captain Kangaroo Won the War: Released November 20, 2015; Label: Guided By Voices Inc. (GBVI-65); Format: 4 CDs

== Compilation albums ==
Each of the four Briefcase releases is a single LP compilation of songs selected from the associated 4-disc Suitcase box-set.

Year	Album details	Peak chart positions	
Year	Album details	US Heat.	US Indie
1992	An Earful O' Wax: Released: 1992; Label: Get Happy Records; Format: LP	—	—
1993	Vampire On Titus/Propeller: Released: 1993; Label: Scat Records/Matador; Format: CD	—	—
1995	King Shit & The Golden Boys: Released: February 2, 1995 (reissued January 27, 2015); Label: Scat (#61); Format: LP, CD	—	—
2000	Briefcase (Suitcase Abridged: Drinks and Deliveries): Released: October 17, 2000; Label: Fading Captain Series (#7); Format: LP	—	—
2003	The Best of Guided by Voices: Human Amusements at Hourly Rates: Released: November 4, 2003; Label: Matador (OLE 565); Format: CD	39	26
2005	Briefcase 2 (Suitcase 2 Abridged – The Return of Milko Waif): Released: October 4, 2005; Label: Fading Captain Series (#38); Format: LP	—	—
2007	Crickets: Best of the Fading Captain Series 1999–2007: Released: May 29, 2007; Label: Fading Captain Series (#44); Format: 2 CDs	—	—
2009	Briefcase 3: Cuddling Bozo's Octopus: Released: November 3, 2009; Label: Guided By Voices Inc. (GBVI-9); Format: LP	—	—
2010	Metro: The Official Bootleg Series, Volume 1: Released: July 25, 2010; Format: CD	—	—
2013	Glue On Bicycle: Released: 2013; Label: Fire Records, Guided By Voices Inc.; Format: CD	—	—
2015	Briefcase 4: Captain Kangaroo Won the War: Released: November 20, 2015; Label: Guided By Voices Inc. (GBVI-64); Format: LP	—	—
2022	Scalping the Guru: Released: October 28, 2022; Label: Guided By Voices Inc. (GBVI-116); Format: CD, CS, LP	—	—

== Soundtracks ==
Year	Album details	Track details
1996	Brain Candy Soundtrack: Released: 1996; Label: Matador (OLE 183-1); Format: LP, CD	#11 - "Postal Blowfish" [New version] (Robert Pollard, Mitch Mitchell)
1999	Buffy the Vampire Slayer: The Album: Released: October 19, 1999; Label: TVT (8300); Format: CD	#2 - "Teenage FBI" (R. Pollard)
2000	Crime and Punishment in Suburbia Soundtrack: Released: August 22, 2000; Label: Milan (73138 35909-2); Format: CD	#12 - "Learning to Hunt" (R. Pollard)
2001	Dean Quixote: The Soundtrack to the Film: Released: November 20, 2001; Label: spinART (SPART 99); Format: CD	#3 - "If We Wait" (R. Pollard)
2002	ESPN's Ultimate X: The Movie Soundtrack: Released: May 14, 2002; Label: Hollywood (162340); Format: CD	#5 - "Skills Like This" (R. Pollard)
2002	Scrubs Soundtrack: Released: September 24, 2002; Label: Hollywood (162353); Format: CD	#8 - "Hold on Hope" (R. Pollard)
2006	Beer League Soundtrack: Released: September 5, 2006; Label: Lakeshore (LKS 338812); Format: CD	#3 - "Bulldog Skin" (R. Pollard); #9 - "Girls of Wild Strawberries" (R. Pollard)

== Video albums ==
Year	Video details
1996	Live at the Whisky a Go Go: Released: 1996; Label: Rockathon; Format: VHS
1998	Watch Me Jumpstart: Released: 1998; Label: Matador (OLE 284); Format: VHS
2000	The Who Went Home and Cried: Released: 2000; Label: Rockathon, MVD; Format: VHS, DVD
2002	Some Drinking Implied: Released: October 12, 2002; Label: Rockathon; Format: DVD
2003	Watch Me Jumpstart: Expanded Version: Released: November 4, 2003; Label: Matador (OLE 596); Format: DVD
2005	The Electrifying Conclusion: Released: November 15, 2005; Label: Plexifilm; Format: DVD
2007	Live from Austin, TX: Released: May 15, 2007; Label: New West; Format: DVD

== Unofficial albums ==
Year	Album details
1994	Crying Your Knife Away: Released: 1994; Label: None/Simple Solution Records; Format: LP, CD, Unofficial live album
1995	For All Good Kids: Released: 1995; Label: None; Format: LP, Unofficial live album
N/A	Live at The Embassy, London, ONT - October 26, 1995: Released: Unknown; Label: None; Format: CD, Unofficial live album
1996	Benefit For The Winos: Released: 1996; Label: None; Format: LP, CD, Unofficial live album
N/A	@ The Garage, London, June 21, 1996: Released: Unknown; Label: None; Format: Cassette, Unofficial live album
1996	Jellyfish Reflector: Released: 1996; Label: None; Format: LP, CD, Unofficial live album
N/A	The Garage, London, October 8, 1997: Released: Unknown; Label: None; Format: Cassette, Unofficial live album
N/A	Live at Bernie's, Columbus, OH - March 28, 1998: Released: Unknown; Label: None; Format: CD, Unofficial live album
1999	I'm Much Greater Than You Think: Released: 1999; Label: None; Format: CD, Unofficial live album

== Books ==
- Guided by Voices: A Brief History — Twenty-One Years of Hunting Accidents in The Forests of Rock and Roll
  - Written by James Greer and published by Grove/Atlantic in 2005, this is the first biography of GBV authorized by the band. Steven Soderbergh wrote the foreword. Author Jim Greer, a former editor of Spin magazine, was also a member of the band from 1994 to 1996 (he wrote the song "Trendspotter Acrobat" on Sunfish Holy Breakfast).
- Bee Thousand
  - Written by Marc Woodworth and published by Continuum Books in 2006 as part of their 33⅓ series, this book is about the 1994 album Bee Thousand. The book explores the unusual production of the album, the lyrics of Robert Pollard, and the influence the album has had.
- Closer You Are: The Story of Robert Pollard and Guided By Voices
  - Written by Matthew Cutter.
