= Dayton, Ohio–19 Something and 5 =

Dayton, Ohio - 19 Something and 5

EP by Guided by Voices
- Released: 2000
- Genre: Rock and roll, indie rock
- Label: Fading Captain Series

Guided by Voices EP chronology
Hold on Hope (2000)	Dayton, Ohio - 19 Something and 5 (2000)	Daredevil Stamp Collector (2001)

Dayton, Ohio - 19 Something and 5 is a 2000 EP by Guided by Voices. "This is a song about smoking dope, having cookouts, and hanging out in the West Side, it's called Dayton, Ohio 19 Something circa and 5", as put by front-man, Robert Pollard. The track is also featured on the album Tonics and Twisted Chasers.

== Track listing ==
Side A

1. "Dayton, Ohio - 19 Something and 5 (Live)"

Side B

1. "Travels"
2. "No Welcome Wagons"
3. "Selective Service"
