= Clown Prince (disambiguation) =

"Clown Prince" is a 2006 song by Australian band Hilltop Hoods.

Clown Prince may also refer to:

- Clown Princes, a 1939 Our Gang short comedy film
- Victor Borge, (born 1909-2000), Danish-American comedian, conductor and pianist nicknamed the "Clown Prince of Denmark"
- Biz Markie (born 1964–2021), American rapper nicknamed the "Clown Prince of Hip Hop"
- Chad Morgan (born 1933), Australian country musician nicknamed the "Clown Prince of Comedy", or of Australian country music
- Jack L. Warner (1892–1978), American film executive nicknamed the "Clown Prince of Hollywood"
- Len Shackleton (1922–2000), English footballer nicknamed the "Clown Prince of Soccer", or of football
- Max Patkin (1920–1999), American baseball player nicknamed the "Clown Prince of Baseball"
- Eddie Sachs (1927–1964), American racing driver nicknamed the "Clown Prince of Auto Racing"
- Joker (character), a supervillain from DC Comics nicknamed the "Clown Prince of Crime"

== See also ==
- Clown Prince of the Menthol Trailer, a 1994 EP by Guided by Voices
- Clown
- Prince
- Crown prince
