= Suitcase Four: Captain Kangaroo Won the War =

Box set by Guided by Voices
- Released: November 20, 2015
- Genre: Rock, Lo-fi, indie rock
- Label: Guided by Voices Inc.

Guided by Voices chronology
Cool Planet (2014)	Suitcase Four: Captain Kangaroo Won the War (2015)	Please Be Honest (2016)

Guided by Voices Box Set chronology
Suitcase 3: Up We Go Now (2009)	Suitcase 4: Captain Kangaroo Won the War (2015)

Professional ratings
Review scores
Source	Rating
The Fire Note	4/5 stars

Suitcase Four: Captain Kangaroo Won the War is the fourth box set of unreleased music by the Dayton, Ohio band Guided by Voices. The collection is compiled in the same manner as the previous three suitcase box sets, with 100 songs spanning four discs complete with fictional band names for each track. The music ranges from demos of classic tracks to studio outtakes and song sketches.

== Track listing ==
=== Disc 1 ===
1. Unruly Compounds – Lead Walking Shorts
2. Jump The Swing – Walls And Windows
3. Jonathon Hyphen Jones – I'm In Shock (Hit Me With Tonic)
4. Vile Typists – Deaf Dumb And Blind Girl
5. Rachel Twit – Try Me On For Size
6. Laser Finch – No One Looking For You
7. Crowd, The – Murphy Had A Birthday
8. Zeppelins Of Gin – Living On Planet Cake
9. Jonathon Hyphen Jones – Great Service
10. Baby Gods – Only Ghost In Town
11. Teenage Guitar – 8 Bars (Ext 3)
12. Target Larks – No Bird
13. Broken Heart Discothèque – Motor Away [Quiet Demo]
14. Canoes – The Garden
15. Jonathon Hyphen Jones – Happy Heartbreaker
16. Pretzel Youth – Less Active Railroad
17. Porky Giant (w/ Jumbo) – Porpoise Northeast
18. Human Possible, The – Pretty Pinwheel
19. Die City – Back To The Diving Board
20. Dashing Plumbers – Mary And The Summer
21. Crowd, The – Eloise
22. Abigail French – Here To Stay
23. Human Brain – She It
24. Christopher Lightship – Hallway Of Shatterproof Glass
25. Nile Eskimo – Govt. Bldg. 15

=== Disc 2 ===
1. Once – Lockets Of The Empress
2. Red Gravity – The New Ooze
3. Invalid Keys – Our Little Secret
4. Jonathon Hyphen Jones – I Can Never Let You Win
5. Cracked Heads, The – Hey You Know Me [Live]
6. Demmit Runyon – Ode To J.D.
7. 1913 Floods, The – I Am Decided [Alternate Mix]
8. Science Of Lamar – Over And Over Again
9. Multi-Colored Wisemen, The – Excellent Extension
10. Up The Family Tree – Good To Look
11. Witches Of Woodstock – Slave Boss Cranberry [Live]
12. Average Roger – Slow Dirty Water
13. Jonathon Hyphen Jones – The Garden Goes
14. Punchin Umps – Save My Life [Live]
15. Obligated Finger – Somethings Missing
16. Crystal Rabbit – Clean It Up
17. Anvil Cranberry – You Don't Know Me (I'm Your Dog)
18. Jonathon Hyphen Jones – You Make The Sun
19. Crowd, The – Time Will Destroy You
20. Fire Engine John – Delayed Reaction Brats [Demo]
21. Jonathon Hyphen Jones – Pretty As Her Cats
22. Sobers – One Big Boss
23. Human Possible, The – Mystery Walk
24. Crowd, The – Then Again
25. The Sunflower Logic – Son Of The Sea

=== Disc 3 ===
1. Union Bellboy – Bellboy Stomp
2. Crowd, The – Linda's Lottery
3. Jonathon Hyphen Jones – Of Course You Are [Demo]
4. Poof – Pinpoints On The Anal Zone
5. Eyeball Magazine – City With Fear
6. Stonehenge Birdhouse – She Doesn't Know Why
7. Greenish Monsoon – (I Been) Pigeon Tripping
8. The Peter Pan Can – Fall All Over Yourself
9. Pontiac Seagulls – Quality Of Armor [Very Early Version]
10. Pete Star – Teeth Flashlight [Demo]
11. Hoarse Gorilla – Let's Make Out
12. Bob Silky – Busy Bee
13. The Sunflower Logic – Why Do You Stare Into The Sea
14. Boy Rocker – Rock Time
15. Canoes – Heartbeat
16. Amazed By Extra Indians – Near As Not Late
17. Abigail French – Finger To The Lips
18. Mousetrap Speaker – Carnal Limousine
19. Faint Wives – Doctor Boyfriend
20. Jonathon Hyphen Jones – Spiraling Epsilon
21. Rachel Twit – Ugly Day Of Rain And Soccer
22. Ink Well Spinsters – Yank For The Rooties
23. Mother Superior Gymnasium – Glad Girls [Early Version]
24. Jonathon Hyphen Jones – (If You've Got A Rocket) Got To Ride
25. Human Possible, The – Frog Baby Axe Murderer

=== Disc 4 ===
1. Maximilian Kittykat – Strange Games
2. Crowd, The – Thick And Thin
3. Red Rubber Ballroom – When 2 Hours Seem Like 5
4. Blazing Archetypes – Find A Wet Spot
5. Zonker Zoon – I'm Just Doing My Job
6. Jonathon Hyphen Jones – Contemporary Man (He Is Our Age) [Demo]
7. Zeppelins Of Gin – Heels Tight
8. Peccadilloes – The House Always Looks So Nice
9. Franklin Ellsworth Bowie – Amazed [Power Of Suck Version]
10. Crowd, The – Disappearing Act
11. Manly Weathers – Rubber Man [Long Version]
12. Target Larks – James Of Life
13. Embry O's – The Jerking Clown
14. Hospital – Psycho All The Time
15. Flavor X – Throwing Down The Line
16. Jonathon Hyphen Jones – Proof
17. Strike Outs, The – Third Grade Aviator
18. Witches Of Woodstock – She Likes Tea Rats [Live]
19. Jonathon Hyphen Jones – Promo Brunette [Demo]
20. Roonies, The – Just One Drop
21. No Equal – Temporary Shutdown
22. Offspeed Macaroni, The – Skin High
23. Jonathon Hyphen Jones – Your Cricket Is Rather Unique
24. Anacrusis – Fame And Fortune
25. Live Forever Foundation – High Treason
