= Zeppelin Over China =

Studio album by Guided by Voices
- Released: February 1, 2019
- Studio: Magic Door, Montclair, NJ; Serious Business Music, Brooklyn, NY; Stillwater Lodge, Dayton, OH
- Genre: Indie rock; progressive rock
- Length: 74:23
- Label: Rockathon Records
- Producer: Travis Harrison

Guided by Voices chronology
Space Gun (2018)	Zeppelin Over China (2019)	Warp and Woof (2019)

Zeppelin over China is the 27th studio album by American indie rock group Guided by Voices. It was released on February 1, 2019 on the Rockathon Records label and was recorded at Magic Door in New Jersey, Serious Business Records in New York and Stillwater Lodge in Dayton, Ohio. The double album received mixed to favorable reviews from critics scoring 65 out 100 on aggregate website Metacritic and four out five stars on AllMusic, with several critics commenting on the positive output of the band's current lineup.

== Composition ==
A double album, though not the band's first, Zeppelin over China sees Guided by Voices covering genres that include indie rock and progressive rock while still maintaining the familiar melodic influences over the course of 32 songs. Commenting on these and other genres touched on by the band during the course of the album, Alex Wisgard of The Line of Best Fit said, "The opening stretch alone offers babbling, sinewy post-punk, dreamy jangle pop and an ominous dirge in quick succession, while other stretches yield delicate filigrees of chamber pop, lysergic behemoths and heavy slabs of concrete rock."

All songs were written by front man Robert Pollard and, typically, few exceed the three minute mark. Several tracks feature string and horn arrangements composed by guitarist Doug Gillard who AllMusic described as "a guitar player with the chops and good taste to make the most of the melodies." The album was mixed, mastered and produced by GbV collaborator Travis Harrison.

== Release ==
Zeppelin over China was released on February 1, 2019, 25 years after the release of one of the band's most critically acclaimed albums, Bee Thousand and 11 months after the release of their previous album, Space Gun. Pollard stated in an interview with Gothamist's Ben Yakas that some leftover songs from the Space Gun sessions were used on this album. In the build-up to the album's release and as part of a marketing strategy for the band's next album titled Warp and Woof the band released four vinyl-only limited edition 7-inch EPs. These were titled Winecork Stonehenge, 100 Dougs, Umlaut over the Özone and 1901 Acid Rock and combined make up the material for Warp and Woof.

== Artwork and title ==
The album artwork is a collage designed by Pollard with additional credit given to Joe Patterson and Vince Williams that shows a card inside a mirror frame. A young girl is depicted on the card with a yellow light being emitted from her extended hand. The title of the album comes from a song written by Pollard in the late 70's titled "Zeppelin over China (And Everybody Thinks It's a Raincloud)". Originally written for a local new wave/punk/garage band called Dash Rip Rock and the Hairspray Boys, he would go on to record the song, later titled "Theolonius Has Eaten All the Paper" with his other band, Circus Devils.

== Critical reception ==
Professional ratings
Aggregate scores
Source	Rating
Metacritic	65/100
Review scores
Source	Rating
AllMusic	4.0/5.0 stars
The Line of Best Fit	8.0/10.0 stars
The Spill Magazine	10.0/10.0 stars
The Skinny	3.0/5.0 stars
Album of the Year	73/100
Spectrum Culture	3.5/5.0 stars

Discussing the album and its "classic" lineup of musicians in his review for AllMusic, Mark Deming said the band were on a hot streak and had released some of their strongest material to date. He praised Pollard's slowed pace of album release saying a single annual release with better material was preferable to the more frequent releases the band previously made. The band released three albums in 2012, for example. Deming concluded his review saying "Guided by Voices have been enjoying an unexpected but very welcome late-career renaissance, and anyone who has ever had a taste for their singular take on rocking pop owes it to themselves to check out Zeppelin Over China".

Also focusing on the band's current lineup in an equally glowing review, Kirsten Innes of The Spill Magazine gave the album a perfect ten out of ten and stated "They tour regularly, don't appear to hate one another, and (aided by engineer Travis Harrison) consistently release new material to well-deserved acclaim". Concerning the album's content Innes wrote "It would be easy to get lost in the wide range of styles, but the measured sequencing ensures that the whole thing sounds smooth rather than sprawling". "Pollard's vocal performance is particularly impressive throughout", she continued "perfectly demonstrating his ability to move from tender melancholy to dreamy faux-English prog" She both lauded and criticized the album's extensive length saying "though initially overwhelming to digest, the album becomes an absolute treasure trove once you’ve strapped yourself in for a couple of listens".

Post-Trash's David Haynes favorably compared the album to GbV's early releases from the 1990s in a positive review stating "The spectacular new double album is a collection of soaring choruses and big riffs that sounds just as fresh and inventive as the band’s celebrated 90s catalog".

In a less favorable review for The Skinny, Paul Sinclair gave the album three out of five stars saying "Zeppelin over China would be a great starting point for any newcomers to the group, however there is nothing necessarily new offered here in the way of direction or sound. The album adds a suitable chapter to the story of Robert Pollard, who recently celebrated releasing a mind-blowing 100 albums over the course of his career in various projects".

== Track listing ==
All songs written by Robert Pollard.

No.	Title	Length
1.	"Good Morning Sir"	1:09
2.	"Step of the Wave"	2:59
3.	"Carapace"	3:03
4.	"Send in the Suicide Squad"	2:06
5.	"Blurring the Contacts"	1:57
6.	"Your Lights Are Out"	3:25
7.	"Windshield Wiper Rex"	1:28
8.	"Holy Rhythm"	2:38
9.	"Jack Tell"	3:19
10.	"Bellicose Starling"	2:15
11.	"Wrong Turn On"	1:49
12.	"Charmless Peters"	3:20
13.	"The Rally Boys"	1:43
14.	"Think. Be a Man."	2:31
15.	"Jam Warsong"	2:30
16.	"You Own the Night"	3:24
17.	"Everything's Thrilling"	2:12
18.	"Nice About You"	1:57
19.	"Einstein's Angel"	2:36
20.	"The Hearing Department"	3:18
21.	"Question of the Test"	2:59
22.	"No Point"	2:05
23.	"Lurk of the Worm"	3:01
24.	"Zeppelin Over China"	0:39
25.	"Where Have You Been All My Life"	1:48
26.	"Cold Cold Hands"	1:56
27.	"Transpiring Anathema"	2:02
28.	"We Can Make Music"	1:42
29.	"Cobbler Ditches"	1:48
30.	"Enough Is Never at the End"	1:13
31.	"My Future in Barcelona"	3:48
32.	"Vertiginous Rafts"	1:43
Total length:		74:23

== Personnel ==
Guided by Voices

- Robert Pollard – vocals
- Doug Gillard – guitar, horn arrangements
- Bobby Bare Jr. – guitar
- Kevin March – drums
- Mark Shue – bass guitar

Technical personnel

- Travis Harrison – production, engineering, mastering, mixing, vocal engineer
- Ray Ketchem – engineering
- Joe Patterson – art administration & layout
- Vince Williams – art administration
- Robert Pollard – art administration & layout
