= The Pipe Dreams of Instant Prince Whippet =

EP by Guided by Voices
- Released: September 17, 2002
- Genre: Rock and roll, indie rock
- Label: Fading Captain Series #24

Guided by Voices EP chronology
Daredevil Stamp Collector (2001)	The Pipe Dreams of Instant Prince Whippet (2002)	Down by the Racetrack (2013)

Professional ratings
Review scores
Source	Rating
Pitchfork	7.8/10 link
PopMatters	link

The Pipe Dreams of Instant Prince Whippet is a 2002 EP by Guided by Voices. It collects the b-sides of the singles from their 2002 album Universal Truths and Cycles, in addition to two unreleased songs.

== Track listing ==
1. "Visit This Place" - 2:35 - B-side of Cheyenne 7"
2. "Swooping Energies" - 1:47
3. "Keep It Coming" - 2:40 - B-side of Everywhere With Helicopter CD single
4. "Action Speaks Volumes" - 3:23 - B-side of Everywhere With Helicopter 7"
5. "Stronger Lizards" - 0:55
6. "The Pipe Dreams of Instant Prince Whippet" - 1:32 - B-side of Everywhere With Helicopter CD single
7. "Request Pharmaceuticals" - 2:12 - B-side of Back to the Lake CD single
8. "For Liberty" - 0:54 - B-side of Back to the Lake CD single
9. "Dig Through My Window" - 3:51 - B-side of Back to the Lake 7"
10. "Beg for a Wheelbarrow" - 3:15 - B-side of Universal Truths and Cycles 7"
