= Down by the Racetrack =

EP by Guided by Voices
- Released: 22 January 2013
- Genre: Rock and roll, indie rock
- Length: 9:39
- Label: Guided by Voices, Inc.

Guided by Voices EP chronology
The Pipe Dreams of Instant Prince Whippet (2002)	Down by the Racetrack (2013)	Wine Cork Stonehenge (2018)

Down by the Racetrack is a 2013 EP by American rock group Guided by Voices. It is the group's first EP since 2002's The Pipe Dreams of Instant Prince Whippet and the first to feature the band's "classic" lineup since 1996's Plantations of Pale Pink.

== Reception ==
Professional ratings
Review scores
Source	Rating
AllMusic	3.5/5 stars
Pitchfork	7.0/10

Fred Thomas on AllMusic describes the sound as "heavy competing fuzz guitar lines, ominous backing vocals, and crispy handclaps", stating that the EP, although less than ten minutes in length, "encapsulates the shakily beautiful Guided by Voices experience and sets the stage for another year of prolific and weird pop". Steven Hyden on Pitchfork calls the EP "a forum for songs that are too bizarre or extemporaneous even by this band's shaggy-dog standards", concluding that it "has all of the mess, melody, magic, and mania of the other records, but in a smaller, more bite-sized, but nonetheless pleasingly indulgent package."

== Track listing ==
Side A:

1. "It Travels Faster Through Thin Hair" (R. Pollard/Demos) – 1:14
2. "Pictures of the Man" (R. Pollard) – 2:37
3. "Amanda Gray" (Tobin Sprout)– 0:44

Side B:

1. "Standing in a Puddle of Flesh" (R. Pollard) – 1:30
2. "Copy Zero" (R. Pollard/Sprout)– 1:48
3. "Down by the Racetrack" (Sprout/Mitchell)– 1:46
