= Hold on Hope =

EP by Guided by Voices
- Released: March 7, 2000
- Genre: Indie rock
- Length: 19:09
- Label: TVT Records

Guided by Voices EP chronology
| Plugs for the Program (1999) | Hold on Hope (2000) | Dayton, Ohio – 19 Something and 5 (2000) |

Professional ratings
Review scores
| Source | Rating |
|---|---|
| Pitchfork | 4.5/10 stars |

Hold on Hope is an EP by Guided by Voices, released March 7, 2000. The titular song was featured in an episode of the TV comedy Scrubs, in the episode 'My Occurrence'. Two songs on the EP are based on songs from the 1996 album Tonics & Twisted Chasers: "Idiot Princess" is an alternate version of "Reptilian Beauty Secrets", and "Do the Collapse" is an instrumental version of "Girl from the Sun".

Pollard later said of the title song, "It was remixed by some big shot producer guy and ended up on soft rock radio. I was in some store around here and an Adult Contemporary Rock station was playing and it was like Kenny G and then "Hold on Hope" in a row. I just wanted to go hide. Initially I intended the song to be heavier and it ended up a little too light for me. I apologized when I turned it in to Ric Ocasek (the Cars) our producer at the time. He said that’s it! That's the monster ballad. So regrettably there was no going back."

== Track listing ==
1. "Underground Initiations" - 2:04
2. "Interest Position" - 2:25
3. "Fly Into Ashes" - 2:26
4. "Tropical Robots" - 0:51
5. "A Crick Uphill" 2:23
6. "Idiot Princess" - 1:38
7. "Avalanche Aminos" - 2:10
8. "Do the Collapse" - 1:43
9. "Hold on Hope" - 3:33
