= An Earful O' Wax =

Compilation album by Guided By Voices
- Released: 1992
- Genre: Rock
- Label: Get Happy Records

Guided By Voices chronology
An Earful O' Wax	Vampire On Titus/Propeller

An Earful O' Wax is a compilation album, released by Guided By Voices in 1992.

Other releases of this album may have a different image.

== Track listing ==
1. Navigating Flood Regions
2. Captain's Dead
3. The Hard Way
4. Crux
5. Hey Hey, Spaceman
6. An Earful O'Wax
7. Lips Of Steel
8. How Loft I Am
9. Sometimes I Cry
10. A Visit To The Creep Doctor
11. The Future Is In Eggs
12. The Great Blake Street Canoe Race
13. Pendulum
14. Long Distance Man
15. Old Battery
16. The Old Place
17. Liar's Tale
