= La La Land (Guided by Voices album) =

Studio album by Guided by Voices
- Released: January 20, 2023
- Recorded: 2022
- Studio: Magic Door, Montclair, New Jersey, United States
- Genre: Art punk; indie rock
- Length: 35:06
- Language: English
- Label: Guided by Voices, Inc.
- Producer: Travis Harrison

Guided by Voices chronology
Scalping the Guru (2022)	La La Land (2023)	Welshpool Frillies (2023)

La La Land is the 37th studio album by American indie rock band Guided by Voices, released on January 20, 2023. The release has received positive reviews from critics and was preceded by the single "Instinct Dwelling".

== Reception ==
La La Land received positive reviews from critics noted at review aggregator Metacritic. It has a weighted average score of 77 out of 100, based on seven reviews.

Editors at AllMusic rated this album 4 out of 5 stars, with critic Fred Thomas writing that this album "is a continuation of Tremblers and Goggles by Rank's expansive construction, moving further away from the patented short, sharp pop that GbV made their name on in the '90s and opting for relatively longer song lengths, more complex song structures, and a generally more angular side of the band". Writing for PopMatters, John Garratt ratred La La Land a 7 out of 10, writing that it "represent[s] a significant step in Pollard's songwriting" and that the music is "paradoxically becoming more streamlined while simultaneously branching out". Fred Barrett of Slant Magazine compares this music to art punk and sums up his 4.5 out of 5 star review "not only does the band's output remain as inexhaustible and freewheeling as ever, the album stands as some of their best late-career work". In Uncut, Peter Watts rated La La Land 4 out of 5 stars, also noting similarities with Tremblers and Goggles by Rank and praising frontman Robert Pollard's "ability to write a song about almost anything, taking a melody or concept and running with it, and then doing it again, and again, and again, over and over, with spirit-raising results". Under the Radar's Ian Rushbury gave this album 6 out of 10 stars, critiquing, "there's enough old school GBV tunes... to keep the hardcore happy, but a few tunes here really push the envelope".

This was included in BrooklynVegan's listing of 33 great albums from indie/alternative legends, along with Nowhere to Go but Up.

== Track listing ==
All songs written by Robert Pollard

1. "Another Day to Heal" – 1:49
2. "Released into Dementia" – 2:19
3. "Ballroom Etiquette" – 2:48
4. "Instinct Dwelling" – 2:47
5. "Queen of Spaces" – 3:01
6. "Slowly on the Wheel" – 6:00
7. "Cousin Jackie" – 4:02
8. "Wild Kingdom" – 3:21
9. "Caution Song" – 2:18
10. "Face Eraser" – 2:51
11. "Pockets" – 3:49

== Personnel ==
Guided by Voices

- Bobby Bare Jr. – guitar, backing vocals
- Doug Gillard – guitar, backing vocals, string arrangement
- Kevin March – drums, backing vocals
- Robert Pollard – lead vocals, guitar, cover art, layout
- Mark Shue – bass guitar, backing vocals

Additional personnel

- Travis Harrison – production
- Ray Ketchem – drum engineering
- Joe Patterson – layout, artwork
- Daniel Roses – French horn on "Cousin Jackie"
- Vince Williams – artwork

== See also ==
- List of 2023 albums
