= Jellyfish Reflector =

Live album by Guided By Voices
- Released: 1996
- Genre: Rock
- Label: None (Jellyfish)

Guided By Voices chronology
Jellyfish Reflector	Live from Austin, TX

Jellyfish Reflector is an unofficial live album, released by Guided By Voices in 1996.

The drawing cover art is from 'Animals as Doctors' by Pierre Bernard.

== Track list ==
1. "Man Called Aerodynamics"
2. "Rhine Jive Click"
3. "Cut-Out Witch"
4. "Burning Flag Birthday Suit"
5. "The Official Ironmen Rally Song"
6. "Bright Paper Werewolves"
7. "Lord Of Overstock"
8. "Your Name Is Wild"
9. "Look At Them"
10. "Underwater Explosions"
11. "Don't Stop Now"
12. "Office Of Hearts"
13. "Lethargy"
14. "Game Of Pricks"
15. "Striped White Jets"
16. "Melted Pat"
17. "Hot Freaks"
18. "Postal Blowfish"
19. "My Son Cool"
20. "King And Caroline"
21. "Motor Away"
22. "Pimple Zoo"
23. "Some Drilling Implied"
24. "Shocker In Gloomtown"
25. "A Salty Salute"
26. "Gold Star For Robot Boy"
27. "Tractor Rape Chain"
28. "Yours To Keep"
29. "Echos Myron"
30. "Weed King"
31. "Bug House"
32. "Pantherz"
33. "I'll Buy You A Bird"
  Professional ratings
  Review scores
  Source	Rating
  AllMusic	3/5 stars

== Personal ==
- Robe r

t Pollard - Vocals

- Mitch Mitchell - Lead Guitar
- Tobin Sprout - Rhythm Guitar
- Greg Demos - Bass
- Kevin Fennell - Drums
