= Sweating the Plague =

Studio album by Guided by Voices
- Released: October 25, 2019
- Genre: Indie rock
- Length: 37:48
- Label: Guided By Voices Inc.

Guided by Voices chronology
Warp and Woof (2019)	Sweating the Plague (2019)	Surrender Your Poppy Field (2020)

Professional ratings
Aggregate scores
Source	Rating
Metacritic	72/100
Review scores
Source	Rating
AllMusic	3.5/5 stars
Exclaim!	7/10
PopMatters	8/10 stars
Slant	4/5 stars
Uncut	3/5 stars

Sweating the Plague is the 29th album released by Guided by Voices, released on October 25, 2019.

== Track listing ==
All songs written by Robert Pollard.

1. "Downer" – 3:13
2. "Street Party" – 2:00
3. "Mother's Milk Elementary" – 2:24
4. "Heavy Like the World" – 3:13
5. "Ego Central High" – 3:02
6. "The Very Second" – 4:43
7. "Tiger on Top" – 3:02
8. "Unfun Glitz" – 2:54
9. "Your Cricket (Is Rather Unique)" – 3:02
10. "Immortals" – 3:08
11. "My Wrestling Days Are Over" – 2:12
12. "Sons of the Beard" – 4:48

== Personnel ==
- Robert Pollard – vocals
- Doug Gillard – guitar
- Bobby Bare Jr. – guitar
- Mark Shue – bass guitar, backing vocals on "Your Cricket"
- Kevin March – drums, lead vocals on "Your Cricket"
- Travis Harrison – drums on "Your Cricket"
