= Warp and Woof =

Studio album by Guided by Voices
- Released: April 26, 2019
- Genre: Indie rock
- Length: 37:32
- Label: Guided By Voices Inc.

Guided by Voices chronology
| Zeppelin Over China (2019) | Warp and Woof (2019) | Sweating the Plague (2019) |

Professional ratings
Aggregate scores
| Source | Rating |
|---|---|
| Metacritic | 76/100 |
Review scores
| Source | Rating |
| AllMusic | 3.5/5 stars |
| Exclaim! | 6/10 |
| Uncut | 8/10 |
| Under the Radar | 7/10 |

Warp and Woof is the 28th album released by Guided by Voices, released on April 26, 2019.

== Track listing ==
All songs written by Robert Pollard, except where noted.

1. "Bury the Mouse" – 1:30
2. "Angelic Weirdness" – 1:33
3. "Foreign Deputies" – 1:00
4. "Dead Liquor Store" – 1:31
5. "Mumbling Amens" – 1:55
6. "Cohesive Scoops" – 1:31
7. "Photo Range Within" – 1:15
8. "My Dog Surprise" – 1:41
9. "Tiny Apes" – 1:07
10. "Blue Jay House" – 2:04
11. "Down the Island" – 1:48
12. "Thimble Society" – 1:44
13. "My Angel" – 1:25
14. "More Reduction Linda" – 1:36
15. "Cool Jewels and Aprons" – 1:24
16. "Even Next" – 1:39
17. "It Will Never Be Simple" (Doug Gillard) – 2:31
18. "The Stars Behind Us" – 1:22
19. "Skull Arrow" – 1:03
20. "Out of the Blue Race" – 1:21
21. "Coming Back from Now On" – 1:53
22. "The Pipers, the Vipers, the Snakes!" – 1:47
23. "Time Remains in Central Position" – 1:49
24. "End It with Light" – 1:10

== Personnel ==
- Robert Pollard – vocals
- Doug Gillard – guitar
- Bobby Bare Jr. – guitar
- Mark Shue – bass guitar
- Kevin March – drums
