= Strut of Kings =

Studio album by Guided by Voices
- Released: June 28, 2024
- Genre: Indie rock; progressive rock; power pop
- Length: 35:39
- Label: Guided by Voices, Inc.; Rockathon
- Producer: Travis Harrison

Guided by Voices chronology
Nowhere to Go but Up (2023)	Strut of Kings (2024)	Universe Room (2025)

Singles from Strut of Kings
- 1. "Serene King" Released: April 16, 2024; 2. "Cavemen Running Naked" Released: May 15, 2024

To tell you the truth, I like unfocused albums, but this one seems more focused. The structures are more cohesive. It also has a nice balance of the genres in rock that I like. Some nice power pop songs but also some fairly crazy stuff. A good balance, emotionally, of heavy and light.

—Vocalist and songwriter Robert Pollard on how Strut of Kings fits into Guided by Voices' catalog.

Strut of Kings is the fortieth studio album by American indie rock band Guided by Voices, released on June 28, 2024, through Rockathon Records and their own Guided by Voices, Inc. label. It has received positive reviews from critics and was preceded by the singles "Serene King" and "Cavemen Running Naked".

== Reception ==
Professional ratings
Aggregate scores
Source	Rating
Metacritic	78/100
Review scores
Source	Rating
AllMusic	3.5/5 stars
Exclaim!	6/10

According to the review aggregator Metacritic, Strut of Kings received "generally favorable reviews" based on a weighted average score of 78 out of 100 from 4 critic scores. Editors at AllMusic rated this album 3.5 out of 5 stars, with critic Mark Deming writing that the songwriting displays Robert Pollard's interest in progressive rock "with stately melodies, big guitars, arrangements that make the most of dynamics, and drumming that milks the drama for all its worth". At BrooklynVegan, Bill Pearis stated that this album continues the band's hot streak since reforming in 2017 and that this album has "indie rock earworms" and "gloriously titled fist-pumpers". Exclaim!'s Daniel Sylvester scored Strut of Kings a 6 out of 10, critiquing that songs are stretched too thin with filler, but continued that "the core of many of these numbers are incredibly strong and tight". This was album of the week at Louder Than War, where Nathan Whittle gave it 4 out of 5 and wrote that this music has the "ability to turn on a sixpence, to jump from their earlier alt/rock spark to moments that breath with more space and drop down into plaintive spaces that keeps your ear to their furtile ground". Stevie Chick of Mojo gave this album 4 out of 5 stars, writing that "Pollard sounds more curious and engaged here than on some recent releases, and the result is the most compelling GBV of their third act". Online retailer Qobuz included this among the five best rock albums of the month, stating that it "is packed with anthems-in-waiting replete with big, hooky choruses and powerful, crunching guitars". In Uncut, Daniel Wray called this album "a pleasing yet ever-shifting journey to be taken on" and scored it an 8 out of 10.

== Track listing ==
All tracks are written by Robert Pollard.

1. "Show Me the Castle" – 4:25
2. "Dear Onion" – 1:47
3. "This Will Go On" – 2:09
4. "Fictional Environment Dream" – 3:55
5. "Olympus Cock in Radiana" – 2:50
6. "Leaving Umbrella" – 3:36
7. "Cavemen Running Naked" – 2:22
8. "Timing Voice" – 3:32
9. "Bit of a Crunch" – 4:42
10. "Serene King" – 3:14
11. "Bicycle Garden" – 3:07

== Personnel ==
Guided by Voices

- Bobby Bare Jr. – guitar
- Doug Gillard – guitar, string arrangement
- Kevin March – drums
- Robert Pollard – lead vocals, guitar, artwork, layout, art department
- Mark Shue – bass guitar

Additional personnel

- Travis Harrison – production
- Ray Ketchem – drum recording
- Joe Patterson – layout, art department
- Vince Williams – art department
- Sarah Zade-Pollard – art management

== See also ==
- 2024 in American music
- List of 2024 albums
