= Motivational Jumpsuit =

Studio album by Guided by Voices
- Released: February 18, 2014
- Studio: Cyberteknics in Dayton, Ohio
- Genre: Indie rock
- Length: 37:39
- Label: Guided by Voices Inc. / Fire Records (UK)

Guided by Voices chronology
English Little League (2013)	Motivational Jumpsuit (2014)	Cool Planet (2014)

Professional ratings
Aggregate scores
Source	Rating
Metacritic	77/100
Review scores
Source	Rating
AllMusic	4/5 stars
The A.V. Club	C+
Consequence of Sound	B
Exclaim!	9/10
Pitchfork Media	7.3/10

Motivational Jumpsuit is the 21st album by Dayton, Ohio rock group Guided by Voices. It was released in February 2014 under their own record label, Guided by Voices Inc. It reached #18 on the Top Heatseekers chart.

== Track listing ==
All tracks are written by Robert Pollard, except where noted.

No.	Title	Length
1.	"The Littlest League Possible"	1:18
2.	"Until Next Time"	1:28
3.	"Writer's Bloc (Psycho All the Time)"	2:43
4.	"Child Activist"	1:21
5.	"Planet Score"	1:41
6.	"Jupiter Spin" (Tobin Sprout)	2:23
7.	"Save the Company"	2:21
8.	"Go Without Packing"	1:14
9.	"Record Level Love" (Sprout)	1:16
10.	"I Am Columbus"	2:54
11.	"Difficult Outburst and Breakthrough"	1:42
12.	"Calling Up Washington" (Sprout)	1:12
13.	"Zero Elasticity"	2:06
14.	"A Bird With No Name"	1:23
15.	"Shine (Tomahawk Breath)" (Sprout)	3:03
16.	"Vote For Me Dummy"	2:21
17.	"Some Things Are Big (And Some Things Are Small)" (Sprout)	2:08
18.	"Bulletin Borders"	1:23
19.	"Evangeline Dandelion"	1:16
20.	"Alex and the Omegas"	2:15
Total length:		37:39
