= It's Not Them. It Couldn't Be Them. It Is Them! =

Studio album by Guided by Voices
- Released: October 22, 2021
- Recorded: 2021
- Genre: Indie rock; power pop; psychedelic pop; psychedelic rock
- Length: 41:41
- Language: English
- Label: Guided by Voices, Inc.
- Producer: Travis Harrison

Guided by Voices chronology
Earth Man Blues (2021)	It's Not Them. It Couldn't Be Them. It Is Them! (2021)	Crystal Nuns Cathedral (2022)

It's Not Them. It Couldn't Be Them. It Is Them! is the 34th studio album by American indie rock band Guided by Voices, released on October 22, 2021. It has received positive reviews from critics.

== Reception ==
It's Not Them. It Couldn't Be Them. It Is Them! received positive reviews from critics noted at review aggregator Metacritic. It has a weighted average score of 80 out of 100, based on four reviews. Editors at AllMusic rated this album 4 out of 5 stars and named it the Best of 2021, with critic Mark Deming writing that the music is reminiscent of Herb Alpert and Arthur Lee and characterizing this work as "excellent" and "superior work from a great rock band". In Mojo, this release received 4 out of 5 stars, with critic James McNair praising Robert Pollard's ability to combine various music genres. Paul Rowe of PopMatters characterizes this release as "a surprising [album] chock-full of bizarre, unpredictable moves and power-pop rippers that keep listeners guessing along the way", rating it 8 out of 10. A 7 out of 10 came from Uncut's Jim Wirth who notes that while the band's "base template" remains the same, many songs have different musical instruments or genres to ensure that the music is "never indifferent, never quite the same".

== Track listing ==
All songs written by Robert Pollard.

1. "Spanish Coin" – 3:20
2. "High in the Rain" – 3:39
3. "Dance of Gurus" – 2:37
4. "Flying Without a License" – 2:47
5. "Psycho House" – 2:47
6. "Maintenance Man of the Haunted House" – 2:43
7. "I Share a Rhythm" – 2:02
8. "Razor Bug" – 1:06
9. "I Wanna Monkey" – 2:49
10. "Cherub and the Great Child Actor" – 2:06
11. "Black and White Eyes in a Prism" – 4:39
12. "People Need Holes" – 2:43
13. "The Bell Gets Out of the Way" – 2:27
14. "Chain Gang Island" – 3:51
15. "My (Limited) Engagement" – 2:06

== Personnel ==
Guided by Voices

- Bobby Bare Jr. – guitar, backing vocals
- Doug Gillard – guitar, backing vocals, horn and string arrangement
- Kevin March – drums, backing vocals
- Robert Pollard – lead vocals, guitar, cover concept, layout
- Mark Shue – bass guitar, backing vocals

Additional personnel

- Travis Harrison – mixing, production
- Ray Ketchem – drum engineering
- Trevor Naud – Mark Shue photography
- Joe Patterson – layout, back cover treatment and photography
- Jeff Powell – mastering for vinyl LP edition
- Jamal Ruhe – mastering

== See also ==
- List of 2021 albums
