= Suitcase 3: Up We Go Now =

Box set by Guided by Voices
- Released: 2009
- Recorded: 1990s–2009
- Genres: Rock, lo-fi, indie rock
- Labels: Guided By Voices, Inc.

Guided by Voices chronology
| Suitcase 2: American Superdream Wow (2005) | Suitcase 3: Up We Go Now (2009) | Let's Go Eat the Factory (2012) |

Guided by Voices Box Set chronology
| Suitcase 2: American Superdream Wow (2005) | Suitcase 3: Up We Go Now (2009) | Suitcase 4: Captain Kangaroo Won the War (2015) |

Professional ratings
Review scores
| Source | Rating |
|---|---|
| Pitchfork Media | (5.3/10) |

Suitcase 3: Up We Go Now is the third in a series of unreleased songs and instrumental sketches by the Dayton, Ohio band Guided By Voices, released on November 3, 2009 on GBV Inc. Like the previous two volumes, Suitcase 3 is a four-disc set containing 100 songs, many of which are credited to fake bands such as "Kelsey Boo Flip, Heartthrob Johnson Firestone, Erotic Zip Codes and the like." The fourth disc consists of impromptu acoustic jams recorded during 1994 and 1995.

== Track listing ==
Fictitious band names shown in italics.

=== Disc 1: The Door Is Much Smaller, You See ===
1. Mr. Inspection Table - Building a Castle
2. Explosion Topic - Tired of Knocking
3. The Sobbers - Together/Apart
4. Remington Ash - Away with Driver
5. Demon Gods of Anger - Trash Truck
6. Manners of Flash - Dropping the Bomb
7. Remington Ash - What's So Safe About You
8. Limited Transplitter - Troopers in the Town
9. The Stools - Gas
10. C.C. Rip - Watch 'Em Diggin' Up the Road
11. Fate 1 Mile - Coastal Town
12. Watts - Escape from Kama Loka
13. Ben Franklin Air Bath - The Annex
14. Major Cockamamie - Green Ivory Cross
15. The Beautiful Orange Lemonade - Janet Wait
16. C.C. Rip - Independent Productions
17. Jubilant Toy Soldiers - Three White Flower
18. Pilthy May - Juggernaut vs. Monolith
19. The Perfect Nose Club - Feels Good
20. Video Bearhunt - Candy Machine
21. Dream Reaper - Air and Also a World
22. Gel Clay - Back to the Navy
23. The Governers - Speak Like Men
24. Kelsey Boo Flip - Hi, I'm Kelsey
25. Star of Hungry - No Trash Allowed

=== Disc 2: I Can't Think...Yeah ===
1. The Flattering Lights - Raphael Muzak
2. Service of a Bullet - Tear the Ticket in Half
3. Search - I'm an Acting Student
4. The Sums - I'll Come (and When It Does It's Mine)
5. East Dayton Rock Co. - Psycholophobia
6. East Dayton Rock Co. - Take Me Back
7. Bruce Smitty Smith - Sonny the Monster
8. Pilthy May - I Share a Rhythm
9. The Sobbers - Before My Eyes
10. Gavin Speaks - Freedom Rings
11. Hoof - Cochise
12. The Tallywackers - When's the Last Time
13. Remington Ash - That's Good
14. Pig Lucy - You Gotta Lotta Nerve
15. Mother's Day Haircut - Vagabond Lover
16. Fate 1 Mile - Banners
17. Looker - 100 Colors
18. Autobahn Damen - Old Engine Driver
19. Gel Clay - Joe
20. Cubscout Bowling Pins - Axtual Sectivity
21. The Working Girls - Call Me
22. Demon Gods of Anger - Believe It
23. Royal Canadien Mustard - Class Clown Spots a UFO
24. Remington Ash - You You You
25. 10 Second Coma - Dibble

=== Disc 3: Thou Shall Read The Wheel ===
1. Bird Shit Mosaic - Night Ears
2. The Sobbers - Amnesia
3. Blaine Hazel - Fly Away (Tommy Sez)
4. Jubilant Toy Soldiers - Peace and Persecution
5. The Constant Rushing Forward - There Are Other Worlds
6. Knuckles And MacDougal - It's the Song
7. Erotic Zip Codes - One Drop
8. Angel and The Alley Oops - Mainstay
9. John Shough - Sixland
10. Ghetto Tree - How Bridges Fall
11. Basic Switches - A Kind of Love
12. Naymoan Regas - Bad Whiskey
13. Curtis E. Flush - Naked Believer (I Am)
14. Heartless Microscopes - Out of the House
15. Equal in Coma - Grow
16. Psyclops - Rough Tracks
17. Gel Clay - Nothing So Hard
18. Bumble Gub - Piss Along You Bird
19. Gene Autrey's Psychic - 300 Birds (Quota)
20. The CD's - The Fire King Says No Cheating
21. Heartthrob Johnson Firestone - Poison Shop
22. The Worst Santini - Trader Vic
23. History of Well Hung Men - Smothered In Hugs (4-Track Version)
24. Aerial Poop Show - Dibble 2
25. Kid Biscuit - Huffman Prairie Flying Field

=== Disc 4: Tall Tale Moon (Antiquated) And Other Known Facts - Spontaneous Lo-Fly Field Recordings ===
==== Controlled Acoustic Jams 1994 • Between The Recordings Of Bee Thousand And Alien Lanes ====
All credited to Guided By Voices

1. Pluto Is Polluted
2. Aquarian Hovercraft
3. Brand New Star
4. Sea-Mint Robots
5. South Rat Observatory
6. The Cinnamon Flavored Skull
7. Porpoise Mitten (Was a Real Good Kitten)
8. Mr. Spoon
9. Hey Mr. Soundman
10. Oh Pie
11. Kotex Moon
12. Bingo Pool Hall of Blood
13. There Goes the King Again
14. Evil Vandalia/Mojo Crew Zenith
15. Cuddling Bozo's Octopus
16. I Shot a Jezebel
17. After the Quake (Let's Bake a Cake)
18. P Melts Everything
19. My Dad Is a Motorboat
20. Ugly Ba Ba
21. Hairspray Lies
22. Sawhorse With Big Blue Ears
23. Tough Skin River
24. Cruise (demo)
25. Alright (demo)
