= Sunfish Holy Breakfast =

EP by Guided by Voices
- Released: 19 November 1996
- Genre: Rock and roll, indie rock
- Length: 22:48
- Label: Matador

Guided by Voices EP chronology
Tigerbomb (1995)	Sunfish Holy Breakfast (1996)	Plantations of Pale Pink (1996)

Professional ratings
Review scores
Source	Rating
Allmusic	3.0/5.0 stars

Sunfish Holy Breakfast is an EP by Guided by Voices, a band from Dayton, Ohio. It was released on 19 November 1996.

== Track listing ==
All songs written by Robert Pollard except where noted.

1. "Jabberstroker" (Tobin Sprout) – 2:39
2. "Stabbing a Star"– 1:41
3. "Canteen Plums" – 1:15
4. "Beekeeper Seeks Ruth" (R. Pollard, Sprout) – 2:37
5. "Cocksoldiers and Their Postwar Stubble" – 3:29
6. "A Contest Featuring Human Beings" (R. Pollard, Sprout) – 1:07
7. "If We Wait" – 2:53
8. "Trendspotter Acrobat" (Jim Greer) – 1:47
9. "The Winter Cows" (R. Pollard, Sprout) – 2:04
10. "Heavy Metal Country" – 3:16
