= Suitcase 2: American Superdream Wow =

Box set by Guided by Voices
- Released: 2005
- Recorded: 1978–2005
- Genre: Rock, Lo-fi, indie rock
- Label: Fading Captain Series

Guided by Voices chronology
Half Smiles of the Decomposed (2004)	Suitcase 2: American Superdream Wow (2005)	Suitcase 3: Up We Go Now (2009)

Guided by Voices Box Set chronology
Hardcore UFOs (2003)	Suitcase 2 (2005)	Suitcase 3: Up We Go Now (2009)

Professional ratings
Review scores
Source	Rating
Allmusic	3/5 stars
Pitchfork Media	7.0/10

Suitcase 2: American Superdream Wow is the second box set of 100 unreleased songs by Guided by Voices. As with the first Suitcase box set, each song is credited to a fictional band name. For this set's artwork, fictional artwork, album covers, and ephemera associated with some of the acts was created.

The mastering process for this set involved a cassette-deck and a consumer-model standalone CD burner operated by bandleader Robert Pollard himself, and the transfer process left a handful of tracks marred by digital audio glitches.

The subtitle "American Superdream Wow" comes from lyrics from the song "Denied" on From a Compound Eye .

Pollard later created a band called Boston Spaceships, which appears as a song on this collection.

== Track listing ==
Fictitious bandnames do not appear in italics. Continuing from the previous Suitcase: Failed Experiments and Trashed Aircraft, the discs are numbered 5–8 and the songs 101–200.

Disc 5:

1. "The Plague" – This Ream – 1:34
2. "Terror Of Living" – Rocket Head – 2:38
3. "Ragged Enzymes" – The Golden Pickle – 0:29
4. "Hey John, Bees" – Your Charming Proposal – 1:08
5. "Wim Dials" – Searing Tonight – 1:52
6. "Billy Ray Human" – Somewhere Sometime – 3:04
7. "Milko Waif" – If You Think It's Easy – 1:00
8. "Wig Stomper" – His Spacetruck Is Strange – 2:11
9. "Child Of Joe" – Tin Can Laughter – 2:55
10. "7 Feet Of Sunshine" – Sacred Space – 2:07
11. "Bore Co." – Soul Flyers – 3:07
12. "Throne" – Gods Of Richard – 1:32
13. "Scott Joy" – It's Only Up To You – 2:19
14. "Ax" – Dancing With The Answers – 4:06
15. "Devron Zones" – Waiting For Your Touch – 1:44
16. "Milko Waif" – Soggy Beavers – 0:45
17. "The Bug-Eyed Mums" – Invisible Train To Earth – 1:53
18. "Seraphim Barf" – Stingy Queens – 3:20
19. "Karma Yeah" – Something For Susan In The Shadows – 2:18
20. "Heavy River" – Sinister Infrared Halo – 4:05
21. "Herkimer Mohawk" – Happy At The Drag Strip – 2:08
22. "Apes In The Window" – Arms – 2:03
23. "Yummy Ropes" – Solid Gold Animal Collection – 1:46
24. "Some Are Bullets In Dreams" – Beach Towers – 4:24
25. "Bleep Bleep F*ck" – Cosmic Clown – 1:05

Disc 6:

1. "Timid Virus" – I Am Decided – 2:12
2. "Mutts U.K." – Tainted Angels With Butter Knives – 2:24
3. "Brainbow" – What About The Rock? – 6:43
4. "Scott Joy" – Pack Of Rolling Papers – 0:26
5. "The One Too Many" – Telephone Town – 2:41
6. "The Pukes" – Hey, I Know Your Old Lady – 0:48
7. "Dale Frescamo" – Headache Revolution – 1:19
8. "Stumpy In The Ocean" – Every Man – 2:16
9. "Milko Waif" – Alibible – 1:37
10. "Ben Zing" – I Can't Help But Noticing – 2:20
11. "Red Faced Rats" – Mannequin's Complaint – 2:09
12. "U B Hitler" – Zarkoff's Coming – 1:35
13. "Acid Ranch" – Supersonic Love Funky Love Gun – 2:18
14. "The Bad Babies" – Perch Warble [Studio Version] – 1:28
15. "Scott Joy" – You're Not The Queen Anymore – 1:24
16. "Throne" – Ivanhoe – 1:01
17. "Herkimer Mohawk" – How Can You? – 1:53
18. "Shoot'em" – The Lodger Carried A Gun – 2:47
19. "Modular Dance Units" – Metro XVI – 1:47
20. "Milko Waif" – My Dream Making Machine – 1:22
21. "Usually To Death" – Mustard Man – 4:18
22. "Wheels Pig Harvey" – Alone In Time – 1:10
23. "The Plexigrall Bee-hive" – Dusty Bushworms [Different Version] – 3:22
24. "Wheels Pig Harvey" – Free It – 1:14
25. "Christopher Lightship" – Are You Faster? [Demo] – 3:42

Disc 7:

1. "The Fake Organisms" – A Proud And Booming Industry [Different Version] – 2:25
2. "We Too Bark" – Two Or Three Songs – 2:20
3. "Milko Waif" – Little Games – 1:03
4. "Ax" – Daughter Of The Gold Rush – 4:58
5. "Leon Lemans" – Color Coat Drawing – 3:48
6. "Silent Knife" – Learning To Burn – 1:32
7. "Howling Wolf Orchestra" – A Minute Before The Evil Street – 1:00
8. "The Needmores" – I'd Choose You – 3:55
9. "Wavo" – You're Killin' Me – 1:40
10. "Lectricalroo" – Old Friend – 2:05
11. "Devron Zones" – She Don't Shit (No Golden Bricks For Me) – 0:51
12. "Milko Waif" – I Have A Hard Heart – 0:53
13. "The One Too Many" – Shoddy Clothes – 4:08
14. "The Plague" – Sordid Forst – 2:08
15. "The Needmores" – Shake It Out – 2:01
16. "The Accidental Texas Who" – Cowboy Zoo – 1:45
17. "Peter Built Bombs" – Soul Barn – 3:16
18. "Modular Dance Units" – Phase IV (Rise Of The Ants) – 3:22
19. "Burial Wind" – Piece – 1:09
20. "Sucko" – Lonely Town – 2:46
21. "Wavo" – Do Be – 1:02
22. "Academy Of Crowsfeet" – Boston Spaceships – 2:44
23. "Scott Joy" – Drugs & Eggs – 2:32
24. "Stumpy In The Ocean" – That Ain't No Good – 2:31
25. "Alvin Haisles" – Immediate Frozen Lookalikes – 0:43

Disc 8:

1. "7 Feet Of Sunshine" – Madroom Assistance – 2:31
2. "Praying Man vs. Bo Diddley" – Man of Dimension – 2:21
3. "Alvin Haisles" – Nerve Gas – 0:47
4. "The Fun Punk 5" – Do The Ball – 1:21
5. "Peter Built Bombs" – The Issue Presents Itself – 2:52
6. "The Banana Show" – Leprechaun Catfish Fighter – 0:29
7. "Leon Lemans" – Child – 3:12
8. "Howling Wolf Orchestra" – Invisible Exercise – 2:00
9. "Carl Goffin" – All Around The World – 1:39
10. "Alvin Haisles" – Late Night Scamerica – 1:51
11. "Stumpy In The Ocean" – A World Of My Own – 2:50
12. "Milko Waif" – She's The One – 0:56
13. "7 Dog 3" – Daddy's In The State Pen – 1:58
14. "The One Too Many" – Cox Municipal Airport Song – 2:25
15. "Gene Autrey's Psychic" – Scare Me No. 3 – 1:18
16. "Manimal" – Grope – 2:33
17. "God's Little Lightning Bolt" – Heavy Crown – 2:13
18. "Wim Dials" – So Roll Me Over – 1:12
19. "The Inbrids" – Home By Ten – 2:38
20. "Milko Waif" – Come Make My Shadow – 1:39
21. "The One Too Many" – Paper Girl [Different Version] – 1:46
22. "Yummy Ropes" – Jimmy's Einstein Poster – 0:50
23. "Hot Skin Apartment" – My Only Confection – 1:45
24. "Otim Grimes" – Groundwork – 2:59
25. "The Fun Punk 5" – Bye Bye Song – 2:47
