= Surrender Your Poppy Field =

Studio album by Guided by Voices
- Released: February 20, 2020
- Recorded: 2019
- Studio: Serious Business Music (New York City, New York); Magic Door (Montclair, New Jersey)
- Genre: Indie rock; power pop
- Label: Guided by Voices Inc.
- Producer: Travis Harrison

Guided by Voices chronology
Sweating the Plague (2019)	Surrender Your Poppy Field (2020)	Mirrored Aztec (2020)

Surrender Your Poppy Field is the 30th studio album by American rock band Guided by Voices.

== Track listing ==
All tracks are written by Robert Pollard.

No.	Title	Length
1.	"Year Of The Hard Hitter"	4:01
2.	"Volcano"	3:05
3.	"Queen Parking Lot"	1:28
4.	"Arthur Has Business Elsewhere"	2:54
5.	"Cul-De-Sac Kids"	2:35
6.	"Cat Beats A Drum"	2:37
7.	"Windjammer"	2:39
8.	"Steely Dodger"	2:44
9.	"Stone Cold Moron"	2:30
10.	"Physician"	3:37
11.	"Man Called Blunder"	2:49
12.	"Woah Nelly"	1:00
13.	"Andre The Hawk"	2:01
14.	"Always Gone"	1:36
15.	"Next Sea Level"	3:07

== Personnel ==
=== Guided by Voices ===
- Robert Pollard – lead vocals
- Doug Gillard – guitar, backing vocals, string arrangement
- Kevin March – drums, backing vocals
- Mark Shue – bass guitar, backing vocals
- Bobby Bare Jr. – guitar, backing vocals

=== Additional musicians ===
- Abby Shue – vocals (track 9)

=== Technical ===
- Travis Harrison – engineering
- Ray Ketchum – engineering
- Vince Williams – art direction
- Sarah Zade-Pollard – art direction
- Jamal Ruhe – mastering
- Jeff Powell – mastering
- Robert Pollard – artwork, layout
