= Static Airplane Jive =

EP by Guided by Voices
- Released: December 1993
- Genre: Rock and roll, indie rock
- Length: 10:46
- Label: City Slang

Guided by Voices EP chronology
The Grand Hour (1993)	Static Airplane Jive (1993)	Get Out of My Stations (1994)

Professional ratings
Review scores
Source	Rating
Allmusic	4.5/5 stars

Static Airplane Jive is a 1993 EP by Guided by Voices.

== Track listing ==
All songs written by Robert Pollard unless otherwise noted.

=== Side A ===
1. "Big School" – 2:26
2. "Damn Good Mr. Jam" (Randy Campbell / R. Pollard / Tobin Sprout) – 3:35

=== Side B ===
3. "Rubber Man" (Kevin Fennell / R. Pollard) – 0:34
4. "Hey Aardvark" (Mitch Mitchell / Jim Pollard / R. Pollard) – 0:51
5. "Glow Boy Butlers" – 1:54
6. "Gelatin, Ice Cream, Plum …" – 1:26

== See also ==
- Scalping the Guru, a 2022 compilation collecting all of these tracks in remastered form.
