= Live from Austin, TX (Guided by Voices album) =

Live From Austin, TX

Live album by Guided by Voices
- Released: 2007
- Recorded: 2004
- Genre: Indie rock
- Length: 88:56
- Label: New West Records
- Producer: Cameron Strang

Live From Austin, TX is a live album by indie rock band Guided by Voices, recorded on November 9, 2004 and released by New West Records.

== Reception ==
Professional ratings
Review scores
Source	Rating
AllMusic	4/5 stars
Pitchfork	4.5/10

The live album received mixed reviews. Mark Deming of AllMusic describes the band's performance as "little short of remarkable", noting how "nearly everything sounds like a winner as these musicians spin gold from their leader's singular pop hooks". According to Matt LeMay of Pitchfork, the album "seems like an average night out for late-era Guided by Voices", where the band hits are "played no better and no worse than usual".

== Track listing ==
=== Disc One ===
1. "Demons Are Real" – 1:39
2. "Pimple Zoo" – 1:33
3. "Everybody Thinks I'm a Raincloud (When I'm Not Looking)" – 3:27
4. "Exit Flagger" – 2:14
5. "Sleep Over Jack" – 3:00
6. "Girls of Wild Strawberries" – 2:33
7. "Navigating Flood Regions" – 2:46
8. "Gold Star for Robot Boy" – 1:58
9. "Window of My World" – 3:08
10. "Redmen and Their Wives" – 4:06
11. "Dayton, Ohio – 19 Something and 5" – 2:11
12. "My Impression Now" – 2:23
13. "Do the Earth" – 3:22
14. "Game of Pricks" – 2:23
15. "Secret Star" – 7:31

=== Disc Two ===
1. "My Kind of Soldier" – 3:29
2. "Sad If I Lost It" – 3:33
3. "Cut Out Witch" – 3:33
4. "Gonna Never Have to Die" – 2:32
5. "Best of Jill Hives" – 2:50
6. "Watch Me Jumpstart" – 2:51
7. "Tractor Rape Chain" – 2:56
8. "Buzzards and Dreadful Crows" – 1:57
9. "Pendulum" – 2:03
10. "Murder Charge" – 2:53
11. "Fair Touching" – 3:33
12. "Teenage FBI" – 2:57
13. "Glad Girls" – 3:59
14. "I Am a Scientist" – 2:48
15. "Echos Myron" – 2:44

== Personnel ==
- Robert Pollard – vocals
- Doug Gillard – lead guitar
- Nate Farley – rhythm guitar
- Chris Slusarenko – bass
- Kevin March – drums
