= Mag Earwhig! =

Studio album by Guided by Voices
- Released: 1997
- Recorded: 1997
- Studio: Cro-Magnon Studios (Dayton, Ohio)
- Genres: Alternative rock, progressive rock
- Length: 45:52
- Label: Matador
- Producers: Robert Pollard; Doug Gillard; John Croslin; John Petkovic; Don Depew; Dave Swanson; Tobin Sprout; Jim Pollard; Mitch Mitchell; Joe Buben; Kevin Fennell; John Shough; Chad Stanisic

Guided by Voices chronology
Tonics and Twisted Chasers (1996)	Mag Earwhig! (1997)	Do the Collapse (1999)

Singles from Mag Earwhig!
- 1. "Bulldog Skin" Released: May 6, 1997; 2. "I Am a Tree" Released: July 29, 1997

Professional ratings
Review scores
Source	Rating
AllMusic	4/5 stars
NME	6/10
Pitchfork Media	8.0/10

Mag Earwhig! is the 10th studio album by American indie rock band Guided by Voices. Following the dissolution of the group's "classic" lineup, band-leader Robert Pollard recruited Cleveland group Cobra Verde as his backing band, while retaining the Guided by Voices name. It was the second release to feature future long-term collaborator Doug Gillard. Gillard had previously played on and co-wrote the song "Mice Feel Nice (In My Room)" on the Tigerbomb EP. Most of Mag Earwhig! was recorded in a professional studio in Cleveland by the new lineup and marked a departure from band's trademark lo-fi sound; additional songs were also recorded in Dayton, Ohio.

The album touches on elements of hard rock and progressive rock on tracks such as "Portable Men's Society" and "Little Lines", alongside typical shorter lo-fi tracks.

== Track listing ==
All songs written by Robert Pollard unless otherwise noted.

1. "Can't Hear the Revolution" – 1:36
2. "Sad If I Lost It" – 3:10
3. "I Am a Tree" (Doug Gillard) – 4:40
4. "The Old Grunt" – 1:28
5. "Bulldog Skin" – 2:59
6. "Are You Faster?" (Jim Pollard, R. Pollard, Tobin Sprout) – 1:13
7. "I Am Produced" (R. Pollard, Sprout) – 1:06
8. "Knock 'Em Flyin'" – 1:52
9. "Not Behind the Fighter Jet" – 2:13
10. "Choking Tara" – 1:24
11. "Hollow Cheek" – :32
12. "Portable Men's Society" – 4:16
13. "Little Lines" – 2:02
14. "Learning to Hunt" – 2:24
15. "The Finest Joke Is Upon Us" – 3:08
16. "Mag Earwhig!" – :39
17. "Now to War" – 2:44
18. "Jane of the Waking Universe" – 2:25
19. "The Colossus Crawls West" – 2:13
20. "Mute Superstar" – 1:24
21. "Bomb in the Bee-Hive" – 2:03

== Personnel ==
=== Guided by Voices ===
- Robert Pollard – vocals, electric guitar, acoustic guitar, piano, lead guitar (tracks 6, 15), drums (track 1), casio (tracks 1, 2)
- Doug Gillard – electric guitar, acoustic guitar, nylon-string guitar, backing vocals, bass, lead guitar (tracks 3, 5, 12, 17, 20, 21)
- John Petkovic – electric guitar, synthesizer, backing vocals, lead guitar (track 13)
- Don Depew – electric guitar, bass, synthesizer, organ, backing vocals
- Dave Swanson – drums, maracas, backing vocals

=== Additional musicians ===
- Tobin Sprout – bass, slide guitar (track 18); backing vocals (tracks 1, 18), lead guitar (track 6), acoustic guitar, Casio (track 7); drums (track 6)
- Jim Pollard – bass, guitar (track 6); casio (tracks 1, 4)
- Mitch Mitchell – bass (tracks 9, 12, 13, 20), guitar (track 18)
- Kevin Fennell – drums (tracks 8, 15, 18)
- Joe Buben – drums (tracks 2)
- John Shough a.k.a. Johnny Strange – bass (tracks 2, 14, 15), programming (tracks 2, 14)
- Chad Stanisic – organ (track 5)
