= Earth Man Blues =

Studio album by Guided by Voices
- Released: April 30, 2021
- Recorded: 2020–2021
- Genre: Indie rock; power pop
- Length: 37:13
- Language: English
- Label: Guided by Voices, Inc.
- Producer: Travis Harrison

Guided by Voices chronology
Styles We Paid For (2020)	Earth Man Blues (2021)	It's Not Them. It Couldn't Be Them. It Is Them! (2021)

Earth Man Blues is the 33rd studio album by American indie rock band Guided by Voices, released by Guided by Voices, Inc. on April 30, 2021. The album is made up of unreleased songs that frontman Robert Pollard reworked to form a loose concept album about his childhood and has received positive reviews from critics.

== Reception ==
Earth Man Blues received positive reviews from critics noted at review aggregator Metacritic. It has a weighted average score of 76 out of 100, based on four reviews. Editors at AllMusic rated this album 4 out of 5 stars, with critic Fred Thomas writing that "despite this unending stream of new material, the band shows no signs of diluting creativity, and the 15 songs on Earth Man Blues find songwriter Bob Pollard exploring the weirder corners of his mind in between delivering more straightforward power pop bangers". Robin Ferris of The Line of Best Fit rated Earth Man Blues a 5 out of 10, stating that the album "unfortunately doesn’t really do justice to either of these ambitions" of lo-fi music from their early career or polished pop songcraft. Writing for Pitchfork, Hubert Adjei-Kontoh rated this album a 6.5 out of 10, calling it "equally inconsistent and ingenious" and praising it for having "some of Robert Pollard’s most direct lyricism", with "slipshod and freewheeling" music. Brenna Erhlich of Rolling Stone gave this release 4 out of 5 stars, stating that it "may be the power-pop heroes’ best album in decades" and that it "squarely hits all the marks that make Guided By Voices great", exhorting listeners to "put this record on and see how long it takes to utter your first joyful expletive". In The Spill Magazine, Kirsten Innes gave this release 4 out of 5, calling it "an album of tremendous depth" with several genre changes that display creative freedom and confidence in the band's sound.

== Track listing ==
All songs written by Robert Pollard.

1. "Made Man" – 1:22
2. "The Disconnected Citizen" – 3:12
3. "The Batman Sees the Ball" – 3:18
4. "Dirty Kid School" – 2:56
5. "Trust Them Now" – 2:21
6. "Lights Out in Memphis (Egypt)" – 5:41
7. "Free Agents" – 2:00
8. "Sunshine Girl Hello" – 2:25
9. "Wave Starter" – 1:34
10. "Ant Repellent" – 2:36
11. "Margaret Middle School" – 1:10
12. "I Bet Hippy" – 2:30
13. "Test Pilot" – 1:30
14. "How Can a Plumb Be Perfected?" – 2:59
15. "Child's Play" – 1:39

== Personnel ==
Guided by Voices

- Bobby Bare Jr. – guitar, backing vocals
- Doug Gillard – guitar, backing vocals
- Kevin March – drums, backing vocals
- Robert Pollard – lead vocals, guitar, cover art, layout
- Mark Shue – bass guitar, backing vocals

Additional personnel

- Travis Harrison – mixing, production
- Ray Ketchem – drum engineering
- Joe Patterson – artwork, layout
- Jeff Powell – mastering for vinyl LP edition
- Jamal Ruhe – mastering
- Vince Williams – artwork

== See also ==
- List of 2021 albums
