= Space Gun (album) =

Studio album by Guided by Voices
- Released: March 23, 2018
- Studios: Serious Business Music in Brooklyn, New York and The Stillwater River Lodge in Dayton, Ohio
- Genre: Indie rock
- Length: 38:55
- Labels: Rockathon Records; Guided By Voices, Inc.

Guided by Voices chronology
How Do You Spell Heaven (2017)	Space Gun (2018)	Zeppelin Over China (2019)

Professional ratings
Aggregate scores
Source	Rating
Metacritic	77/100
Review scores
Source	Rating
AllMusic	4/5 stars
Exclaim!	7/10
PopMatters	7/10
The Skinny	4/5 stars
Under the Radar	7/10

Space Gun is the 26th studio album by American indie rock band Guided by Voices. It was released on March 23, 2018 under Guided by Voices, Inc.

This album was recorded and mixed by Travis Harrison at Serious Business Music, NY, and Stillwater River Lodge

== Critical reception ==
Space Gun was met with "generally favorable" reviews from critics. At Metacritic, which assigns a weighted average rating out of 100 to reviews from mainstream publications, this release received an average score of 77, based on 12 reviews. Aggregator Album of the Year gave the release a 72 out of 100 based on a critical consensus of 14 reviews.

== Track listing ==
All tracks are written by Robert Pollard.

No.	Title	Length
1.	"Space Gun"	4:18
2.	"Colonel Paper"	1:59
3.	"King Flute"	1:22
4.	"Ark Technician"	2:18
5.	"See My Field"	2:47
6.	"Liars' Box"	2:49
7.	"Blink Blank"	3:25
8.	"Daily Get-Ups"	1:35
9.	"Hudson Rake"	1:44
10.	"Sport Component National"	2:48
11.	"I Love Kangaroos"	3:07
12.	"Gray Spat Matters"	1:28
13.	"That's Good"	3:15
14.	"Flight Advantage"	2:23
15.	"Evolution Circus"	3:36
Total length:		38:55

== Personnel ==
- Robert Pollard – lead and backing vocals
- Doug Gillard – guitar, backing vocals on "Sport Component National"
- Bobby Bare Jr. – guitar
- Mark Shue – bass guitar, backing vocals on "Sport Component National"
- Kevin March – drums
