= English Little League =

Studio album by Guided by Voices
- Released: April 30, 2013
- Studio: The Public Hi-Fi Balloon in Dayton, Ohio
- Genre: Indie rock
- Length: 45:54
- Label: Guided by Voices Inc. / Fire Records (UK)

Guided by Voices chronology
The Bears for Lunch (2012)	English Little League (2013)	Motivational Jumpsuit (2014)

Professional ratings
Aggregate scores
Source	Rating
Metacritic	71/100
Review scores
Source	Rating
Consequence of Sound	4/5 stars
The A.V. Club	B

English Little League is the 19th album by Dayton, Ohio rock group Guided by Voices.

In a July 2013 interview with Magnet magazine, Robert Pollard hinted that English Little League would be the final Guided by Voices album. A 20th album Motivational Jumpsuit was then released in 2014.

== Track listing ==
All tracks are written by Robert Pollard, except where noted.

No.	Title	Writer(s)	Length
1.	"Xeno Pariah"		2:04
2.	"Know Me As Heavy"		2:50
3.	"Islands (She Talks In Rainbows)"	Tobin Sprout	2:16
4.	"Trashcan Full Of Nails"		3:31
5.	"Send To Celeste (And The Cosmic Athletes)"		3:19
6.	"The Quiet Game"	Sprout	3:19
7.	"Noble Insect"	Pollard, Sprout	3:24
8.	"Sir Garlic Breath"	Pollard, Greg Demos	2:26
9.	"Crybaby 4-Star Hotel"		1:53
10.	"Biographer Seahorse"		3:36
11.	"Flunky Minnows"		2:12
12.	"Birds"	Pollard, Sprout	2:45
13.	"The Sudden Death Of Epstein's Ways"	Sprout	2:16
14.	"Reflections In A Metal Whistle"		1:47
15.	"Taciturn Caves"		3:55
16.	"A Burning Glass"		2:01
17.	"W/ Glass In Foot"		2:20
Total length:			45:54

== Charts ==
Chart (2013)	Peak position
US Heatseekers Albums (Billboard)	21
