= Class Clown Spots a UFO =

Studio album by Guided by Voices
- Released: June 12, 2012
- Recorded: 2012
- Genre: Indie rock
- Length: 39:54
- Label: Guided by Voices Inc. (US); Fire (UK)
- Producer: Guided by Voices

Guided by Voices chronology
Let's Go Eat the Factory (2012)	Class Clown Spots a UFO (2012)	The Bears for Lunch (2012)

Professional ratings
Review scores
Source	Rating
HEAVEmedia	8/10 stars
The A.V. Club	B+
Spectrum Culture	4.25/5 stars
Pitchfork	(7.0/10)
AllMusic	3.5/5 stars
Consequence of Sound	C+

Class Clown Spots a UFO is the 17th album by Dayton, Ohio rock group Guided by Voices. The album is the second released since the reunion of the band's classic lineup earlier in the same year and it debuted at #12 on Billboard's Top Heatseekers albums chart.

== Track listing ==
All tracks are written by Robert Pollard, except where noted.

No.	Title	Length
1.	"He Rises! Our Union Bellboy"	3:02
2.	"Blue Babbleships Bay"	1:18
3.	"Forever Until It Breaks" (Tobin Sprout)	3:16
4.	"Class Clown Spots a Ufo"	3:17
5.	"Chain to the Moon" (Greg Demos, Pollard)	1:00
6.	"Hang Up and Try Again"	2:16
7.	"Keep It in Motion"	2:07
8.	"Tyson's High School" (Mitch Mitchell, Pollard)	2:36
9.	"They and Them" (Sprout)	1:10
10.	"Fighter Pilot" (Sprout)	1:00
11.	"Roll of the Dice, Kick in the Head"	0:47
12.	"Billy Wire"	2:04
13.	"Worm with 7 Broken Hearts"	0:50
14.	"Starfire" (Sprout)	1:27
15.	"Jon the Croc"	2:33
16.	"Fly Baby" (Demos, Pollard)	1:43
17.	"All of This Will Go" (Sprout)	1:46
18.	"The Opposite Continues"	1:37
19.	"Be Impeccable"	2:57
20.	"Lost in Spaces" (Sprout)	0:51
21.	"No Transmission"	2:19
Total length:		39:54
