= Tigerbomb =

EP by Guided by Voices
- Released: November 14, 1995
- Genre: Rock and roll, indie rock, lo-fi
- Length: 13:11
- Label: Matador Records

Guided by Voices EP chronology
I Am a Scientist (1994)	Tigerbomb (1995)	Sunfish Holy Breakfast (1996)

Professional ratings
Review scores
Source	Rating
Allmusic	3.0/5.0 stars

Tigerbomb is an EP by the indie rock band Guided by Voices. It was released in 1995 on Matador Records.

The first two tracks are professionally recorded versions of songs from the Alien Lanes LP (the original LP versions were recorded on four-track cassette). The music video for the track "My Valuable Hunting Knife" used the version from this EP. The band's "best of" compilation, Human Amusements at Hourly Rates, uses the original Alien Lanes version of "My Valuable Hunting Knife" but the re-recorded version of "Game of Pricks".

The entire EP can be found in the Hardcore UFOs box set (disc 2, tracks 3–8).

== Track listing ==
All songs written by Robert Pollard except where noted.

=== Side A ===
1. "My Valuable Hunting Knife" (7" Version) – 2:28
2. "Game of Pricks" (7" Version) – 2:18
3. "Mice Feel Nice (in My Room)" (Doug Gillard, R. Pollard) – 2:20

=== Side B ===
4. "Not Good for the Mechanism" – 2:00
5. "Kiss Only the Important Ones" – 1:28
6. "Dodging Invisible Rays" (Tobin Sprout) – 2:37
