= The Bears for Lunch =

Studio album by Guided by Voices
- Released: November 13, 2012
- Genre: Indie rock
- Length: 43:05
- Label: Guided by Voices Inc. / Fire Records (UK)
- Producer: Todd Tobias/Guided by Voices

Guided by Voices chronology
Class Clown Spots a UFO (2012)	The Bears for Lunch (2012)	English Little League (2013)

Professional ratings
Review scores
Source	Rating
AllMusic	3.5/5 stars
Pitchfork	(7.3/10)
Consequence of Sound	C+

The Bears for Lunch is the 18th album by Dayton, Ohio rock group Guided by Voices. The album is the third released by the band's classic lineup in 2012 and it debuted at No. 9 on Billboard's Top Heatseekers albums chart

== Track listing ==
All tracks are written by Robert Pollard, except where noted.

No.	Title	Length
1.	"King Arthur The Red"	2:15
2.	"The Corners Are Glowing" (Tobin Sprout)	3:02
3.	"Have a Jug"	1:09
4.	"Hangover Child"	2:58
5.	"Dome Rust"	1:10
6.	"Finger Gang"	1:51
7.	"The Challenge Is Much More"	1:49
8.	"Waving at Airplanes" (Sprout)	3:14
9.	"The Military School Dance Dismissal" (Greg Demos, Pollard)	2:07
10.	"White Flag"	2:15
11.	"Skin to Skin Combat" (Sprout)	3:43
12.	"She Lives in an Airport"	2:44
13.	"Tree Fly Jet"	2:46
14.	"Waking Up the Stars" (Sprout)	2:14
15.	"Up Instead of Running"	2:13
16.	"Smoggy Boy"	0:35
17.	"Amorphous Surprise"	2:00
18.	"You Can Fly Anything Right"	1:55
19.	"Everywhere Is Miles from Everywhere"	3:05
Total length:		43:05
