= Welshpool Frillies =

Studio album by Guided by Voices
- Released: July 21, 2023
- Recorded: 2022
- Studio: Brooklyn, New York City, New York, United States
- Genre: Indie rock
- Length: 41:00
- Language: English
- Label: Guided by Voices, Inc.
- Producer: Travis Harrison

Guided by Voices chronology
| La La Land (2023) | Welshpool Frillies (2023) | Nowhere to Go but Up (2023) |

Welshpool Frillies is the 38th studio album by American indie rock band Guided by Voices. It was released on July 21, 2023.

== Recording, release, and promotion ==
Weshpool Frillies continued a series of eight studio albums by Guided by Voices in three years and unlike their previous releases that were mostly recorded at a New Jersey studio, the band's producer Travis Harrison instead recorded this live to tape in a Brooklyn basement. This album was preceded by the singles "Seedling" in May and "Meet the Star" in June". They also promoted this release with a brief North American tour.

== Critical reception ==
Professional ratings
Review scores
| Source | Rating |
|---|---|
| AllMusic | 4/5 stars |
| The Irish Times | 4/5 stars |
| Under the Radar | 7.5/10 stars |

According to the review aggregator Metacritic, Welshpool Frillies received "universal acclaim" based on a weighted average score of 83 out of 100 from four critic scores. Editors at AllMusic rated this album 4 out of 5 stars, with critic Mark Deming writing that "GbV have been on an unprecedented hot streak since 2017" by making a stable line-up of musicians to support frontman Robert Pollard and this album is "an especially impressive example of the strength of Guided by Voices as a band rather than another Pollard project". Writing for BrooklynVegan, Bill Pearis chose this as one of the best albums of the week, stating that "the current lineup of the band rivals any of the “classic” lineups of decades past" and characterizes this release as "down and dirty", due to being recorded live to tape. Eamon Sweeney of The Irish Times gave this album 4 out of 5 stars, calling it "yet another collection of scuzzy pop and delicious riffs, topped off by Pollard’s deadpan voice and surreal lyrics" and stating that the band has evolved from their lo-fi music roots. At The Quietus, Jon Buckland wrote that this album has a "sparkling lyrical display" that "is peppered with powerful language hinting at events untold, slotting together in surprising mixtures, shapes, and forms" and editors chose this as one of the best albums of June and July 2023. Michael James Hall of Under the Radar scored this album a 7.5 out of 10, calling it "a shimmering highlight in the constant, often delightful stream of GBV output".

== Track listing ==
All songs written by Robert Pollard.

1. "Meet the Star" – 3:26
2. "Cruisers' Cross" – 3:30
3. "Romeo Surgeon" – 3:18
4. "Chain Dance" – 1:58
5. "Why Won't You Kiss Me" – 2:09
6. "Animal Concentrate" – 2:38
7. "Cats on Heat" – 1:39
8. "Mother Mirth" – 1:27
9. "Don't Blow Your Dream Job" – 3:34
10. "Awake Man" – 2:19
11. "Rust Belt Boogie" – 4:08
12. "Seedling" – 2:47
13. "Better Odds" – 2:43
14. "Radioactive Pigeons" – 2:30
15. "Welshpool Frillies" – 2:54

== Personnel ==
Guided by Voices

- Bobby Bare Jr. – guitar, backing vocals
- Doug Gillard – guitar, backing vocals, string arrangement
- Kevin March – drums, backing vocals
- Robert Pollard – lead vocals, guitar, cover art, layout
- Mark Shue – bass guitar, backing vocals

Additional personnel

- Travis Harrison – production

== See also ==
- List of 2023 albums
