= Styles We Paid For =

Studio album by Guided by Voices
- Released: December 11, 2020
- Recorded: 2020
- Studio: Magic Door, Montclair, New Jersey, United States; Serious Business Music, Brooklyn, New York City, New York, United States
- Genre: Garage rock; indie rock
- Length: 38:15
- Language: English
- Label: Guided by Voices, Inc.
- Producer: Travis Harrison

Guided by Voices chronology
Mirrored Aztec (2020)	Styles We Paid For (2020)	Earth Man Blues (2021)

Styles We Paid For is the 32nd studio album by American indie rock band Guided by Voices, released on December 11, 2020. The album was initially intended to be recorded only with analog technology and was entitled Before Computers, but the band had to scrap that idea due to the COVID-19 pandemic and instead assembled the recordings by sharing digital files from their respective homes. The album was preceded by the single "Mr. Child" in October and has received positive reviews from critics.

== Reception ==
Editors at AllMusic rated this album 4 out of 5 stars, with critic Timothy Monger writing that it is "no slouch of a record" in spite of Guided by Voices' prodigious output and the band members "gamely readjusted their approach to suit the times and continued their hot streak with another reliably solid latter-day release" with remote collaboration during the COVID-19 pandemic. Writing for Guitar.com, Gary Walker rated Styles We Paid For a 7 out of 10, characterizing it as "restless, varied, challenging and absolutely teeming with ideas" and praising the guitar playing of Doug Gillard. A brief review in Rolling Stone rates it 3.5 out of 5 stars—between "good" and "excellent"—and calls this album "piled high with indie-rock anthems of a guy who never runs out of garage-rock kicks". The Spill Magazine's Matt Morris rated Styles We Paid For 3 out of 5, stating that the album lacks variety: "[u]nfortunately the earworms are only scattered. While nothing is bad, only a few songs truly stick out. With very little instrumental variation and few changes in tempo songs quickly start to blend into each other."

== Track listing ==
All songs written by Robert Pollard

1. "Megaphone Riley" – 2:06
2. "They Don't Play the Drums Anymore" – 2:08
3. "Slaughterhouse" – 4:32
4. "Endless Seafood" – 2:58
5. "Mr Child" – 3:22
6. "Stops" – 2:04
7. "War of the Devils" – 2:32
8. "Electronic Windows to Nowhere" – 1:57
9. "Never Abandon Ship" – 1:56
10. "Roll Me to Heaven" – 2:16
11. "In Calculus Strategem" – 2:04
12. "Crash at Lake Placebo" – 2:45
13. "Liquid Kid" – 3:23
14. "Time Without Looking" – 1:43
15. "When Growing Was Simple" – 2:31

== Personnel ==
Guided by Voices

- Bobby Bare Jr. – guitar, backing vocals
- Doug Gillard – guitar, backing vocals
- Kevin March – drums, backing vocals
- Robert Pollard – lead vocals, guitar, cover art, layout
- Mark Shue – bass guitar, backing vocals

Additional personnel

- Matt Davis – engineering
- Travis Harrison – engineer, mixing, production
- Ray Ketchem – drum engineering
- Mike Lipps – engineering
- Joe Patterson – layout
- Jeff Powell – mastering for vinyl LP edition
- Jamal Ruhe – mastering

== See also ==
- List of 2020 albums
