= Wish in One Hand... =

EP by Guided by Voices
- Released: 1997
- Genre: Rock and roll, indie rock
- Length: 5:58
- Label: Jass

Guided by Voices EP chronology
Plantations of Pale Pink (1996)	Wish in One Hand... (1997)	Plugs for the Program (1999)

Wish in One Hand... is a 1997 EP from Guided by Voices, recorded with a one-off cast, while leader Robert Pollard was between band line-ups. "Teenage FBI" would later be re-recorded, and become the first single from Do the Collapse.

== Track listing ==
All songs written by Robert Pollard.

=== Side A ===
1. "Teenage FBI" [original version] – 1:39
2. "Now I'm Crying" – 1:55

=== Side B ===
1. "Real" – 2:25
