= Crying Your Knife Away =

Live album by Guided by Voices
- Released: 1994
- Genre: Rock
- Label: None

Guided by Voices chronology
Crying Your Knife Away (1994)	For All Good Kids (1995)

Crying Your Knife Away is an unofficial live album by Guided by Voices, released in 1994.

== Tracklist ==
1. Postal Blowfish
2. The Closer You Are The Quicker It Hits You
3. My Valuable Hunting Knife
4. Gold Star For Robot Boy
5. Lethargy
6. Striped White Jets
7. Non-Absorbing
8. Gold Heart Mountain Top Queen Directory
9. Shocker In Gloomtown
10. Motor Away
11. Awful Bliss
12. Tractor Rape Chain
13. Blimps Go 90
14. Exit Flagger
15. I Am A Scientist
16. Quality Of Armor
17. Cruise
18. Unleashed! The Large Hearted Boy
19. Some Drilling Implied
20. If We Wait
21. Weed King
22. Pimple Zoo
23. Break Even
24. Esters Day
25. Invisible Man

Professional ratings
Review scores
Source	Rating
AllMusic	3.5/5.0 stars
