= Get Out of My Stations =

Get out of My Stations

EP by Guided by Voices
- Released: February 1994
- Studio: Snake Pit
- Genre: Rock and roll, indie rock
- Length: 12:27; 22:18 (with bonus tracks)
- Label: Siltbreeze

Guided by Voices EP chronology
Static Airplane Jive (1994)	Get out of My Stations (1994)	Fast Japanese Spin Cycle (1994)

Professional ratings
Review scores
Source	Rating
Allmusic	2.5/5.0 stars

Get out of My Stations is a 1994 EP by Guided by Voices. It was reissued with live bonus tracks on 25 August 2003.

== Track listing ==
=== "This" side ===
1. "Scalding Creek" (Robert Pollard) – 1:36
2. "Mobile" (Mitch Mitchell, Jim Pollard, R. Pollard) – 1:24
3. "Melted Pat" (R. Pollard) – 1:41
4. "Queen of Second Guessing" – 1:22

=== "That" side ===
1. "Dusty Bushworms" (R. Pollard) – 2:33
2. "Spring Tiger" (R. Pollard) – 2:17
3. "Blue Moon Fruit" – 1:33

=== 2003 live bonus tracks ===
1. "Motor Away" – (Mys Tavern, Harrisburg 2/93) (R. Pollard, Tobin Sprout) – 2:11
2. "Hot Freaks" – (Glenn's Hideaway, Lodi, 6/94 (R. Pollard, Sprout) – 2:10
3. "Weed King" – (Khyber Pass, Phila; 8/92) (R. Pollard) – 2:37
4. "Postal Blowfish" – (Boot & Saddle, Phila; 1/93) (Mitchell, R. Pollard) – 2:54

== See also ==
- Scalping the Guru, a 2022 compilation collecting many of these tracks
