= Scalping the Guru =

Compilation album by Guided by Voices
- Released: October 28, 2022
- Recorded: 1993–1994
- Genre: Indie rock
- Length: 33:13
- Language: English
- Label: Guided by Voices, Inc.

Guided by Voices chronology
Tremblers and Goggles by Rank (2022)	Scalping the Guru (2022)	La La Land (2023)

Scalping the Guru is a 2022 compilation album by American indie rock band Guided by Voices. The collection includes tracks from the extended plays Static Airplane Jive (City Slang), Get Out of My Stations (Siltbreeze), Fast Japanese Spin Cycle (Engine Records), and Clown Prince of the Menthol Trailer (Domino), released in 1993 and 1994 and has received positive reviews from critics.

== Reception ==
Scalping the Guru received positive reviews from critics noted at review aggregator Metacritic. It has a weighted average score of 78 out of 100, based on four reviews. Editors at AllMusic rated this album 4 out of 5 stars and named it the Best of 2022, with critic Fred Thomas writing that this period of Guided by Voice's career had "some of the strongest indie rock of its era as well as being emblematic of the lo-fi movement the band was at the forefront of". Pat King of Paste rated the compilation an 8.5 out of 10, calling it "a must for longtime fans who have logged countless hours trying to nab original copies of these EPs". PopMatters' John Garratt rated Scalping the Guru a 7 out of 10, calling the music "fun, rough, and artful" and "a treat".

== Track listing ==
1. "Matter Eater Lad" (Robert Pollard) – 1:11 (Clown Prince of the Menthol Trailer)
2. "Damn Good Mr. Jam" (Randy Campbell, R. Pollard, and Tobin Sprout) – 3:32 (Static Airplane Jive)
3. "Hunter Complex" (Jim Pollard, R. Pollard, and Sprout) – 1:39 (Clown Prince of the Menthol Trailer)
4. "My Impression Now" (R. Pollard) – 2:06 (Fast Japanese Spin Cycle)
5. "Scalding Creek" (R. Pollard) – 1:36 (Get Out of My Stations)
6. "Mobile" (Mitch Mitchell, J. Pollard, and R. Pollard) – 1:24 (Get Out of My Stations)
7. "Melted Pat" (R. Pollard) – 1:41 (Get Out of My Stations)
8. "Glow Boy Butlers" (R. Pollard) – 1:51 (Static Airplane Jive)
9. "Hey Aardvark" (R. Pollard) – 0:48 (Static Airplane Jive)
10. "Spring Tiger" (R. Pollard) – 2:19 (Get Out of My Stations)
11. "Rubber Man" (R. Pollard) – 0:31 (Static Airplane Jive)
12. "Big School" (R. Pollard) – 2:24 (Static Airplane Jive)
13. "Volcano Divers" (R. Pollard) – 1:16 (Fast Japanese Spin Cycle)
14. "Indian Fables" (R. Pollard and Sprout) – 0:41 (Fast Japanese Spin Cycle)
15. "Pink Gun" (R. Pollard) – 0:36 (Clown Prince of the Menthol Trailer)
16. "Dusty Bushworms" (R. Pollard) – 2:29 (Get Out of My Stations)
17. "Gelatin, Ice Cream, Plum" (R. Pollard) – 1:25 (Static Airplane Jive)
18. "Grandfather Westinghouse" (R. Pollard) – 2:24 (Clown Prince of the Menthol Trailer)
19. "Johnny Appleseed" (J. Pollard, R. Pollard, and Sprout) – 2:21
20. "Scalping the Guru" (R. Pollard) – 0:59 (Clown Prince of the Menthol Trailer)

Tracks omitted include "Queen of Second Guessing" (Get Out of My Stations), "Blue Moon Fruit" (Get Out of My Stations), "3rd World Birdwatching" (Fast Japanese Spin Cycle), "Snowman" (Fast Japanese Spin Cycle), "Marchers in Orange" (Different Version) (Fast Japanese Spin Cycle), "Dusted" (Different Version) (Fast Japanese Spin Cycle), "Kisses to the Crying Cooks" (Fast Japanese Spin Cycle), and "Broadcaster House" (Clown Prince of the Menthol Trailer)

== Personnel ==
Guided by Voices

- Greg Demos – bass guitar
- Kevin Fennell – drums
- Larry Keller – drums
- Mitch Mitchell – guitar, backing vocals
- Jim Pollard – guitar
- Robert Pollard – guitar, vocals
- Tobin Sprout – rhythm guitar, backing vocals, recording
- Dan Toohey – bass guitar

Additional personnel

- Mike Hummel

== See also ==
- Lists of 2022 albums
