= Nowhere to Go but Up =

Studio album by Guided by Voices
- Released: November 24, 2023
- Genre: Indie rock
- Length: 38:43
- Label: Guided by Voices, Inc.

Guided by Voices chronology
Welshpool Frillies (2023)	Nowhere to Go but Up (2023)	Strut of Kings (2024)

Singles from Nowhere to Go but Up
- 1. "For the Home" Released: October 11, 2023; 2. "The Race Is On, the King Is Dead" Released: October 31, 2023

Nowhere to Go but Up is the thirty-ninth studio album by American indie rock band Guided by Voices, released on November 24, 2023 through their own Guided by Voices, Inc. label. It has received positive reviews from critics and was preceded by the singles "For the Home" and "The Race Is On, the King Is Dead".

== Reception ==
Professional ratings
Review scores
Source	Rating
AllMusic	3.5/5 stars
Paste	9.0/10

Editors at AllMusic rated this album 3.5 out of 5 stars, with critic Fred Thomas writing that this album "stands apart from the two records that preceded it by months as much as it carves out a new space for itself in the lengthy GbV saga that's been mutating since the early '80s" and continuing that by "the end, Nowhere to Go but Up grows more compositionally adventurous, but saves some catchiness for even its most complexly mapped songs". At BrooklynVegan, Bill Pearis chose this for Album of the Week, stating that Nowhere to Go but Up "finds the band wildly ambitious and totally up to the challenge" and shows that the band has yet to peak and it was also shortlisted for one of the best albums of November 2023. Editors at Paste chose this for album of the week and critic Pat King rated it a 9.0 out of 10 for being part of "the absolutely unprecedented winning streak Pollard and the current version of Guided by Voices have been on" and stating that this is an "essential" entry in the band's discography, ending "there really is no precedent for a band like Guided by Voices, or an artistic visionary like Robert Pollard". It was also shortlisted for one of the ten best albums of November 2023. Editors at Pitchfork included this in a short list of albums to listen to for the week. Grant Sharples of Uproxx included this among the best indie music of the week, calling their 2023's studio albums a hat trick and looking forward to future releases by the band.

Paste included this among the 30 best rock albums of 2023. This was included in the 40 best independent albums of 2023 in BrooklynVegan's Indie Basement and the site's listing of 33 great albums from indie/alternative legends, along with La La Land.

== Track listing ==
All songs written by Robert Pollard.

1. "The Race Is On, the King Is Dead" – 3:30
2. "Puncher's Parade" – 3:53
3. "Local Master Airplane" – 2:16
4. "How Did He Get Up There" – 4:03
5. "Stabbing at Fractions" – 2:48
6. "Love Set" – 3:54
7. "We're Going the Wrong Way In" – 2:31
8. "Jack of Legs" – 3:37
9. "For the Home" – 4:38
10. "Cruel for Rats" – 3:03
11. "Song and Dance" – 4:31

== Personnel ==
Guided by Voices

- Bobby Bare Jr. – guitar, backing vocals
- Doug Gillard – guitar, backing vocals, string arrangement
- Kevin March – drums, backing vocals
- Robert Pollard – lead vocals, guitar, cover art, layout
- Mark Shue – bass guitar, backing vocals

Additional personnel

- Travis Harrison – production, back cover photography
- Terri Nelles – photography
- Joe Patterson – layout
- Vince Williams – art direction
- Sarah Zade-Pollard – art direction

== See also ==
- 2023 in American music
- List of 2023 albums
