= Thick Rich and Delicious =

Studio album by Guided by Voices
- Released: October 31, 2025
- Length: 37:22
- Label: GBV Inc
- Producer: Travis Harrison

Guided by Voices chronology
Universe Room (2025)	Thick Rich and Delicious (2025)	Crawlspace of the Pantheon (2026)

Thick Rich and Delicious is the 42nd studio album by American indie rock band Guided by Voices, released on October 31, 2025. The announcement included the release of the lead single "(You Can't Go Back To) Oxford Talawanda".

== Background ==
The album combines new material with previously unrecorded songs from the band's earlier years.

The band has attributed the hook in "Oxford Talawanda" to a melody singer Robert Pollard had carried for years before bringing it to tape.

== Track listing ==
All tracks are written by Robert Pollard, except "Replay" by Pollard and Mitch Mitchell.

1. "Babies and Gentlemen" – 1:20
2. "(You Can't Go Back To) Oxford Talawanda" – 2:35
3. "Phantasmagoric Upstarts" – 2:52
4. "Lucy's World" – 2:36
5. "Our Man Syracuse" – 2:28
6. "Mother John" – 2:38
7. "Dance of the Picnic Ants" – 1:27
8. "Xeno Urban" – 3:21
9. "A Tribute to Beatle Bob" – 2:46
10. "Replay" – 2:41
11. "Siren" – 2:37
12. "The Lighthouse Resurrection" – 2:12
13. "A. Glum Swoboda" – 3:26
14. "Ozark Ivanho" – 1:14
15. "Captain Kangaroo Won the War" – 3:09

== Personnel ==
Credits adapted from Tidal.

=== Guided by Voices ===
- Bobby Bare Jr. – backing vocals
- Doug Gillard – electric guitar
- Kevin March – drums
- Robert Pollard – lead vocals
- Mark Shue – bass guitar

=== Additional contributor ===
- Travis Harrison – production, mastering
