= Universe Room =

Studio album by Guided by Voices
- Released: February 7, 2025
- Length: 39:32
- Label: Guided By Voices Inc.
- Producer: Travis Harrison

Guided by Voices chronology
Strut of Kings (2024)	Universe Room (2025)	Thick Rich and Delicious (2025)

Universe Room is the forty-first studio album released by American indie rock band Guided by Voices, released on February 7, 2025, through their own Guided By Voices Inc. label. It was preceded by the singles "Fly Religion" (November 22, 2024), "The Great Man" (December 13, 2024), "Dawn Believes" (January 22, 2025), and "Elfin Flower with Knees" (January 24, 2025).

== Background ==
On November 19, 2024, the band announced the release of their new studio album, along with the first single "Fly Religion". Of the new album, frontman Robert Pollard said:

I wanted to create, hopefully, an experience, kind of a wild ride, where the listener would want to hear it multiple times in order to grasp all the sections and fields of sound to discover something new with each listen. I wanted to get a little more sonic diversity for this album. So I asked each member of the band to record all the instruments for one song and I did three songs myself.

== Critical reception ==
Professional ratings
Aggregate scores
Source	Rating
Metacritic	71/100
Review scores
Source	Rating
AllMusic	4/5 stars
The Arts Desk	3/5 stars

Universe Room was met with "generally favorable" reviews from critics. At Metacritic, which assigns a weighted average rating out of 100 to reviews from mainstream publications, this release received an average score of 71, based on 6 reviews.

== Track listing ==
All songs written by Robert Pollard.

1. "Driving Time" – 2:05
2. "I Couldn't See the Light" – 2:55
3. "I Will Be a Monk" – 1:30
4. "The Great Man" – 2:03
5. "Clearly Aware" – 2:36
6. "Dawn Believes" – 3:26
7. "Play Shadows" – 2:00
8. "Fly Religion" – 2:25
9. "The Well Known Soldier" – 1:07
10. "Hers Purple" – 1:05
11. "Independent Animal" – 1:13
12. "19th Man to Fly an Airplane" – 3:41
13. "Elfin Flower with Knees" – 2:20
14. "Fran Cisco" – 3:07
15. "Aluminum Stingray Girl" – 2:19
16. "Aesop Dreamed of Lions" – 3:07
17. "Everybody's a Star" – 2:23

== Personnel ==
=== Guided by Voices ===
- Robert Pollard – lead vocals, artwork, layout
- Doug Gillard – electric guitar, strings
- Bobby Bare Jr. – electric guitar
- Mark Shue – electric bass guitar
- Kevin March – drums

=== Additional contributors ===
- Travis Harrison – production, floor tom on "Aluminum Stingray Girl"
- Ray Ketchem – additional drum recording
- Beckham Bare – piano on "Hers Purple"
