= How Do You Spell Heaven =

Studio album by Guided by Voices
- Released: August 11, 2017
- Recorded: 2017
- Studio: Serious Business Music in Brooklyn, New York and The Stillwater River Lodge in Dayton, Ohio
- Genre: Indie rock, lo-fi
- Length: 37:04
- Label: Rockathon Records

Guided by Voices chronology
August by Cake (2017)	How Do You Spell Heaven (2017)	Space Gun (2018)

Professional ratings
Aggregate scores
Source	Rating
Metacritic	75/100
Review scores
Source	Rating
Pitchfork	7.4/10
AllMusic	4.0/5.0 stars

How Do You Spell Heaven is the 25th album to be released by lo-fi band Guided By Voices. It was released on August 11, 2017.

It was recorded and mixed by Travis Harrison at Serious Business Music, NY, and Stillwater Lodge.

== Track listing ==
All tracks were written by Robert Pollard, except "Pearly Gates Smoke Machine" by Doug Gillard & Pollard.

1. "The Birthday Democrats" – 2:30
2. "King 007" – 2:51
3. "Boy W" – 2:33
4. "Steppenwolf Mausoleum" – 3:21
5. "Cretinous Number Ones" – 1:45
6. "They Fall Silent" – 0:55
7. "Diver Dan" – 2:03
8. "How to Murder a Man (In 3 Acts)" – 2:43
9. "Pearly Gates Smoke Machine" – 4:02
10. "Tenth Century" – 2:37
11. "How Do You Spell Heaven" – 1:52
12. "Paper Cutz" – 2:36
13. "Low Flying Perfection" – 2:36
14. "Nothing Gets You Real" – 2:23
15. "Just to Show You" – 2:17

== Personnel ==
- Bobby Bare Jr. – guitar
- Doug Gillard – guitar
- Kevin March – drums
- Robert Pollard – vocals
- Mark Shue – bass guitar
