= Fast Japanese Spin Cycle =

EP by Guided by Voices
- Released: March 24, 1994
- Genres: Rock and roll, indie rock
- Length: 10:22
- Label: Engine

Guided by Voices EP chronology
Get Out of My Stations (1994)	Fast Japanese Spin Cycle (1994)	Clown Prince of the Menthol Trailer (1994)

Professional ratings
Review scores
Source	Rating
Allmusic	3.0/5 stars

Fast Japanese Spin Cycle is an EP by Guided by Voices, released in 1994.

This release finished tied for 3rd for the EP category in Robert Christgau's Pazz and Jop poll of 1994.

== Track listing ==
All songs written by Robert Pollard unless otherwise noted.

=== Side A ===
1. "3rd World Birdwatching" (Pete Jamison, Jim Pollard, R. Pollard) – 0:42
2. "My Impression Now" – 2:07
3. "Volcano Divers" – 1:19
4. "Snowman" (Kevin Fennell, R. Pollard) – 0:47

=== Side B ===
5. "Indian Fables" (R. Pollard, Tobin Sprout) – 0:42
6. "Marchers in Orange" [Different Version] (J. Pollard, R. Pollard) – 1:19
7. "Dusted" [Different Version] – 2:06
8. "Kisses to the Crying Cooks" – 1:20

== See also ==
- Scalping the Guru, a 2022 compilation collecting many of these tracks
