= August by Cake =

Studio album by Guided by Voices
- Released: April 14, 2017
- Studio: Serious Business Music in Brooklyn, New York and Cyberteknics in Dayton, Ohio
- Genre: Indie rock
- Length: 71:15
- Label: Rockathon

Guided by Voices chronology
Please Be Honest (2016)	August by Cake (2017)	How Do You Spell Heaven (2017)

Professional ratings
Aggregate scores
Source	Rating
Metacritic	70/100
Review scores
Source	Rating
AllMusic	4.0/5.0 stars
Pitchfork	7.1/10

August by Cake is the 24th album by the Dayton, Ohio-based group Guided by Voices. It is also said to be the 100th album recorded by main member Robert Pollard, though different numbers have been counted in his entire discography and side projects. It was released on April 7, 2017. August by Cake is a double album.

== Track listing ==
- All tracks written by Robert Pollard, except noted.
1. "5º On the Inside" – 2:29
2. "Generox Gray" – 1:59
3. "When We All Hold Hands at the End of the World" – 2:03
4. "Goodbye Note" (Doug Gillard) – 2:52
5. "We Liken the Sun" – 2:10
6. "Fever Pitch" – 1:02
7. "Absent the Man" (Mark Shue) – 1:37
8. "Packing the Dead Zone" – 2:52
9. "What Begins On New Years Day" – 2:00
10. "Overloaded" (Kevin March) – 3:33
11. "Keep Me Down" – 2:34
12. "West Coast Company Man" – 1:56
13. "Warm Up to Religion" – 1:53
14. "High Five Hall of Famers" (Bobby Bare, Jr.) – 2:09
15. "Sudden Fiction" (Shue) – 2:42
16. "Hiking Skin" – 1:57
17. "It's Food" – 2:54
18. "Cheap Buttons" – 2:13
19. "Substitute 11" – 2:32
20. "Chew the Sand" (Shue) – 3:46
21. "Dr. Feelgood Falls Off the Ocean" (Robert Pollard/Jim Pollard)– 2:00
22. "The Laughing Closet" – 1:33
23. "Deflect/Project" (Gillard) – 2:34
24. "Upon the Circus Bus" (Bare Jr.) – 2:21
25. "Try It Out (It's Nothing)" – 1:48
26. "Sentimental Wars" (March) – 2:49
27. "Circus Day Holdout" – 2:03
28. "Whole Tomatoes" – 1:13
29. "Amusement Park Is Over" – 2:19
30. "Golden Doors" – 1:42
31. "The Possible Edge" – 2:03
32. "Escape to Phoenix" – 2:08

== Personnel ==
- Robert Pollard – vocals
- Doug Gillard – guitar, vocals
- Bobby Bare Jr. – guitar, vocals
- Mark Shue – bass guitar, vocals
- Kevin March – drums, vocals
