= Crystal Nuns Cathedral =

Studio album by Guided by Voices
- Released: March 4, 2022
- Recorded: 2021
- Genre: Indie rock; power pop
- Length: 38:04
- Language: English
- Label: Guided by Voices, Inc.
- Producer: Travis Harrison

Guided by Voices chronology
It's Not Them. It Couldn't Be Them. It Is Them! (2021)	Crystal Nuns Cathedral (2022)	Tremblers and Goggles by Rank (2022)

Crystal Nuns Cathedral is the 35th studio album by American indie rock band Guided by Voices, released on March 4, 2022. It has received positive reviews from critics.

== Reception ==
Crystal Nuns Cathedral received positive reviews from critics noted at review aggregator Metacritic. It has a weighted average score of 83 out of 100, based on four reviews. Editors at AllMusic rated this album 4 out of 5 stars, with critic Fred Thomas writing that this album "finds a route closer to the middle" of the band's tendencies toward melodic and progressive rock "by turning in 12 relatively concise slices of only occasionally angular power pop" and considers it "one of the band's stronger entries". In Mojo, Andrew Perry gave this release 4 out of 5 stars, calling it "a good'un" that shows that the band "are still scaling new heights" after decades recording. Paul Rowe of PopMatters scored this release a 9 out of 10, characterizing it as a "late-period masterpiece", writing that the band "have struck gold once again, delivering a hi-fi record that proves itself to be just as virtuosic and inventive as any indie rock album of recent memory". In Uncut, Daniel Dylan Wray rated Crystal Nuns Cathedral a 7 out of 10, calling it "solid, reliable indie rock".

== Track listing ==
All songs written by Robert Pollard.

1. "Eye City" – 4:09
2. "Re-Develop" – 3:05
3. "Climbing a Ramp" – 2:40
4. "Never Mind the List" – 2:49
5. "Birds in the Pipe" – 2:55
6. "Come North Together" – 2:55
7. "Forced to Sea" – 3:32
8. "Huddled" – 2:50
9. "Excited Ones" – 3:04
10. "The Eyes of Your Doctor" – 4:05
11. "Mad River Man" – 4:12
12. "Crystal Nuns Cathedral" – 1:48

== Personnel ==
Guided by Voices

- Bobby Bare Jr. – guitar, backing vocals
- Doug Gillard – guitar, backing vocals, string arrangement
- Kevin March – drums, backing vocals
- Robert Pollard – lead vocals, guitar, artwork, layout
- Mark Shue – bass guitar, backing vocals

Additional personnel

- J. Colangelo – drum technician
- Travis Harrison – mixing, production
- Ray Ketchem – drum engineering
- Joe Patterson – layout, back cover treatment and photography
- Jeff Powell – mastering for vinyl LP edition
- Jamal Ruhe – mastering

== See also ==
- Lists of 2022 albums
