= Mirrored Aztec =

Studio album by Guided by Voices
- Released: August 21, 2020
- Studio: Serious Business Music (New York City, New York); Magic Door (Montclair, New Jersey)
- Genre: Indie rock
- Label: Guided by Voices Inc.
- Producer: Travis Harrison

Guided by Voices chronology
Surrender Your Poppy Field (2020)	Mirrored Aztec (2020)	Styles We Paid For (2020)

Mirrored Aztec is the 31st studio album by American indie rock band Guided by Voices.

== Track listing ==
All tracks are written by Robert Pollard

Mirrored Aztec track listing
No.	Title	Length
1.	"I Think I Had It. I Think I Have It Again"	1:53
2.	"Bunco Men"	2:22
3.	"Citizens' Blitz"	1:59
4.	"To Keep An Area"	2:21
5.	"Easier Not Charming"	1:28
6.	"Please Don't Be Honest"	2:29
7.	"Show Of Hands"	2:55
8.	"Lip Curlers"	2:07
9.	"Math Rock"	2:26
10.	"Transfusion"	3:23
11.	"Biker's Nest"	1:53
12.	"A Whale Is Top Notch"	1:04
13.	"I Touch Down"	1:48
14.	"Haircut Sphinx"	2:22
15.	"Screaming The Night Away"	1:57
16.	"Thank You Jane"	3:07
17.	"The Best Foot Forwards"	2:26
18.	"Party Rages On"	2:22

== Personnel ==
=== Guided by Voices ===
- Robert Pollard – lead vocals
- Bobby Bare Jr. – guitar
- Doug Gillard – guitar
- Kevin March – drums
- Mark Shue – bass guitar

=== Additional musicians ===
- Montclair School of Rock Choir – vocals (track 9)

=== Technical ===
- Ami Lane – photography
- Travis Harrison – production, engineering
- Ray Ketchum – engineering
- Jeff Phillips – mastering
- Jamal Ruhe – mastering
- Courtney Latta – cover artwork
- Robert Pollard – artwork
- Sarah Zade-Pollard – art direction
