= Crawlspace of the Pantheon =

Studio album by Guided by Voices
- Released: May 29, 2026
- Length: 37:38
- Label: GBV Inc
- Producer: Travis Harrison

Guided by Voices chronology
Thick Rich and Delicious (2025)	Crawlspace of the Pantheon (2026)

Singles from Crawlspace of the Pantheon
- 1. "We Outlast Them All" Released: February 25, 2026; 2. "Advance Without Dropping" Released: March 25, 2026; 3. "When You're My Clown (Nothing Happens)" Released: April 22, 2026

Crawlspace of the Pantheon is the 43rd studio album by the American indie rock band Guided by Voices, released on May 29, 2026. The announcement of the album coincided with the release of its lead single "We Outlast Them All" on February 25, 2026.

== Background ==
In Rolling Stone, the band's frontman Robert Pollard stated that the album, like its predecessor Thick Rich and Delicious, was recorded in a studio, despite the band members living in different areas across the country. Pollard praised the band's performances for being "tight and energetic". In regard to the songs themselves, Pollard stated that he spent more time working on the lyrics and that he aimed for the album to have an "overall emotional feel". The album is "slightly autobiographical," with "Lost in the Sun" referring to a fictional band called Ivory Gate, a stand-in for Guided by Voices.

== Track listing ==
All tracks are written by Robert Pollard.

No.	Title	Length
1.	"Lost in the Sun"	2:17
2.	"Out with a Theory"	3:10
3.	"One Last Blow"	3:08
4.	"We Outlast Them All"	4:22
5.	"A Grand Ceremonial Jester"	1:18
6.	"Dagon's Plunger"	4:39
7.	"Advance Without Dropping"	2:48
8.	"No Shoe Fits (Floating Babies)"	2:09
9.	"Arthur Square"	3:43
10.	"Landscaping"	3:37
11.	"(How Would You Like a) Chariot Ride"	3:01
12.	"When You're My Clown (Nothing Happens)"	3:26
Total length:		37:38

== Personnel ==
Credits are adapted from Tidal.

=== Guided by Voices ===
- Bobby Bare Jr. – background vocals
- Doug Gillard – electric guitar
- Kevin March – drums
- Robert Pollard – lead vocals, electric guitar
- Mark Shue – bass guitar

=== Additional contributor ===
- Travis Harrison – production
