= I Am a Scientist =

EP by Guided by Voices
- Released: October 15, 1994
- Genre: Indie rock
- Length: 7:48
- Label: Scat

Guided by Voices EP chronology
| Clown Prince of the Menthol Trailer (1994) | I Am a Scientist (1994) | Tigerbomb (1995) |

Professional ratings
Review scores
| Source | Rating |
|---|---|
| Allmusic | 2/5 stars |

I Am a Scientist is a 1994 EP released by Guided by Voices. The title track originally appeared in a stripped down, four track version on the band's celebrated 1994 LP Bee Thousand; a music video was also made. The song appears here in a live-in-studio full-band arrangement recorded by Andy Shernoff, along with three other songs.

== Track listing ==
All songs written by Robert Pollard.

1. "I Am a Scientist" [7" Version] – 2:31
2. "Curse of the Black Ass Buffalo" – 1:20
3. "Do the Earth" – 2:42
4. "Planet's Own Brand" – 1:15
