= Tremblers and Goggles by Rank =

Studio album by Guided by Voices
- Released: July 1, 2022
- Recorded: 2022
- Studio: Magic Door, Montclair, New Jersey, United States
- Genre: Indie rock; progressive rock
- Length: 37:27
- Language: English
- Label: Guided by Voices, Inc.
- Producer: Travis Harrison

Guided by Voices chronology
Crystal Nuns Cathedral (2022)	Tremblers and Goggles by Rank (2022)	Scalping the Guru (2022)

Tremblers and Goggles by Rank is the 36th studio album by American indie rock band Guided by Voices, released on July 1, 2022. It has received positive reviews from critics.

== Reception ==
Tremblers and Goggles by Rank received positive reviews from critics noted at review aggregator Metacritic. It has a weighted average score of 80 out of 100, based on five reviews. Editors at AllMusic rated this album 4 out of 5 stars, with critic Mark Deming writing that "Tremblers and Goggles by Rank reflects his desire to move away from the compact pop tunes that dominated lo-fi triumphs like 1994's Bee Thousand and 1995's Alien Lanes in favor of more ambitious structures" and speculates that the band's recent output has made it "possible [that] Guided by Voices have become the best recording act of their day". James McNair of Mojo gave this release 4 out of 5 stars, praising Robert Pollard's songwriting and writing that his "quality control remains excellent". In The Observer, Phil Mongredien rated Tremblers and Goggles by Rank 3 out of 5 stars, writing that this work "is as packed with invention as ever, leaning towards their proggier side" and criticizing some tracks as "not all as good" as the best of the album. Jay Honeycomb of PopMatters sums up his review that "this colorful album is a strong addition to the enigma of Guided by Voices" that "is a smashing and replayable album that only sometimes forgets that people are listening"; he rated it a 7 out of 10. Peter Watts gave this album an 8 out of 10 in Uncut for an "LP full of charm, imagination, and winning tunes".

== Track listing ==
All songs written by Robert Pollard.

1. "Lizard on the Red Brick Wall" – 4:39
2. "Alex Bell" – 5:03
3. "Unproductive Funk" – 3:28
4. "Roosevelt's Marching Band" – 4:10
5. "Goggles by Rank" – 2:48
6. "Cartoon Fashion (Bongo Lake)" – 2:56
  "All Sick Again"
  "Bongo Lake"
  "Letter Man, Better Man"
  "Bring On the Fobs"
7. "Boomerang" – 1:54
8. "Focus on the Flock" – 3:13
9. "Puzzle Two" – 2:58
10. "Who Wants to Go Hunting" – 6:18

== Personnel ==
Guided by Voices

- Bobby Bare Jr. – guitar, backing vocals
- Doug Gillard – guitar, backing vocals, string arrangement
- Kevin March – drums, backing vocals
- Robert Pollard – lead vocals, guitar, cover art, layout
- Mark Shue – bass guitar, backing vocals

Additional personnel

- Travis Harrison – production
- Ray Ketchem – drum engineering
- Joe Patterson – artwork
- Jeff Powell – mastering for vinyl LP edition
- Jamal Ruhe – mastering
- Vince Williams – artwork

== See also ==
- Lists of 2022 albums
