= Plantations of Pale Pink =

EP by Guided by Voices
- Released: November 19, 1996
- Genre: Rock and roll, indie rock
- Length: 12:01
- Label: Matador

Guided by Voices EP chronology
Sunfish Holy Breakfast (1996)	Plantations of Pale Pink (1996)	Wish in One Hand... (1997)

Professional ratings
Review scores
Source	Rating
Allmusic	2.0/5.0 stars

Plantations of Pale Pink is a 1996 EP by Guided by Voices.

== Track listing ==
All songs written by Robert Pollard.

=== Side A ===
1. "Systems Crash" – 1:19
2. "Catfood on the Earwig" – 2:27
3. "The Who vs. Porky Pig" – 2:00

=== Side B ===
4. "A Life in Finer Clothing" – 1:30
5. "The Worryin' Song" – 1:02
6. "Subtle Gear Shifting" – 3:45
