= Please Be Honest =

Studio album by Guided by Voices
- Released: April 22, 2016
- Studio: Cyberteknics in Dayton, Ohio
- Genre: Indie rock
- Length: 33:21
- Label: Guided by Voices Inc.

Guided by Voices chronology
Cool Planet (2014)	Please Be Honest (2016)	August by Cake (2017)

Professional ratings
Aggregate scores
Source	Rating
Metacritic	65/100
Review scores
Source	Rating
AllMusic	3.5/5 stars
Pitchfork Media	5.9/10
The A.V. Club	B+
Consequence of Sound	C+

Please Be Honest is the 23rd album by Dayton, Ohio, rock group Guided by Voices. It was released April 22, 2016, on Guided by Voices Inc. Robert Pollard wrote all the music and played every instrument on the record.

== Track listing ==
All tracks are written by Robert Pollard.

No.	Title	Length
1.	"My Zodiac Companion"	2:12
2.	"Kid On a Ladder"	1:47
3.	"Come On Mr. Christian"	2:04
4.	"The Grasshopper Eaters"	3:22
5.	"Glittering Parliaments"	2:27
6.	"The Caterpillar Workforce"	1:29
7.	"Sad Baby Eyes"	0:35
8.	"The Quickers Arrive"	2:56
9.	"Hotel X (Big Soap)"	3:01
10.	"I Think a Telescope"	2:30
11.	"Please Be Honest"	2:05
12.	"Nightmare Jamboree"	2:00
13.	"Unfinished Business"	1:30
14.	"Defeatists' Lament"	2:23
15.	"Eye Shop Heaven"	3:00
Total length:		33:21
