= Cool Planet =

Studio album by Guided by Voices
- Released: May 13, 2014
- Recorded: 2014
- Studios: Cyberteknics in Dayton, Ohio
- Genre: Indie rock
- Length: 36:28
- Label: Guided by Voices Inc. / Fire Records
- Producer: Robert Pollard

Guided by Voices chronology
Motivational Jumpsuit (2014)	Cool Planet (2014)	Please Be Honest (2016)

Professional ratings
Aggregate scores
Source	Rating
Metacritic	68/100
Review scores
Source	Rating
AllMusic	3.5/5 stars
Exclaim!	7/10
MusicOMH	3/5 stars
Paste	7.0/10
Pitchfork	6.2/10

Cool Planet is the 22nd album by Ohio-based group, Guided by Voices. It was the final album by the band before their 2016 reformation. It was released in the United States on May 13, 2014, on the band's own label, Guided by Voices Inc. It was released in the UK a few days later, May 19, on Fire Records.

== Track listing ==
All tracks are written by Robert Pollard, except where noted.

No.	Title	Length
1.	"Authoritarian Zoo"	2:22
2.	"Fast Crawl"	1:42
3.	"Psychotic Crush" (Tobin Sprout)	1:23
4.	"Costume Makes the Man" (R. Pollard/Greg Demos)	2:04
5.	"Hat of Flames"	1:32
6.	"These Dooms"	2:00
7.	"Table at Fool's Tooth"	1:21
8.	"All American Boy" (Sprout)	3:45
9.	"You Get Every Game"	2:08
10.	"Pan Swimmer"	1:02
11.	"The Bone Church" (Sprout/Mitch Mitchell)	2:15
12.	"Bad Love Is Easy to Do"	2:05
13.	"The No Doubters"	2:37
14.	"Narrated by Paul" (Sprout)	1:06
15.	"Cream of Lung"	1:14
16.	"Males of Wormwood Mars"	2:53
17.	"Ticket to Hide" (Sprout)	3:04
18.	"Cool Planet"	1:55
Total length:		36:28

== Charts ==
Chart performance for Cool Planet
Chart	Peak position
US Billboard 200	7
