= Clown Prince of the Menthol Trailer =

EP by Guided by Voices
- Released: 1994 (UK)
- Genre: Rock and roll, indie rock
- Length: 10:24
- Label: Domino

Guided by Voices EP chronology
Fast Japanese Spin Cycle (1994)	Clown Prince of the Menthol Trailer (1994)	I Am a Scientist (1994)

Professional ratings
Review scores
Source	Rating
Allmusic	3.0/5.0 stars

Clown Prince of the Menthol Trailer is a 1994 EP by Guided by Voices. The EP's song "Matter-Eater Lad" is based on the DC Comics character of the same name.

== Track listing ==
All songs written by Robert Pollard unless otherwise noted.

=== Side A ===
1. "Matter Eater Lad" – 1:12
2. "Broadcaster House" (Jim Pollard, R. Pollard, Tobin Sprout) – 1:08
3. "Hunter Complex" (Jim Pollard, R. Pollard) – 1:41
4. "Pink Gun" – 0:36
5. "Scalping the Guru" – 1:01

=== Side B ===
6. "Grandfather Westinghouse" – 2:24
7. "Johnny Appleseed" (Jim Pollard, R. Pollard, Tobin Sprout) – 2:21

== See also ==
- Scalping the Guru, a 2022 compilation album collecting Guided by Voices' songs
