= Tonics & Twisted Chasers =

Tonics and Twisted Chasers

Studio album by Guided by Voices
- Released: 1996
- Studio: Unknown studio (Dayton, Ohio)
- Genres: Indie rock; lo-fi
- Length: 28:00 (vinyl); 36:21 (CD)
- Label: Rockathon Records
- Producers: Robert Pollard; Tobin Sprout

Guided by Voices chronology
Under the Bushes, Under the Stars (1996)	Tonics and Twisted Chasers (1996)	Mag Earwhig! (1997)

Professional ratings
Review scores
Source	Rating
Allmusic	link

Tonics and Twisted Chasers is the ninth studio album by American indie rock band Guided by Voices initially released as a 19-track limited-edition fanclub-only vinyl LP in 1996. The following year, it was released in a limited CD edition, with five additional tracks. The album was primarily recorded by principal songwriters Robert Pollard and Tobin Sprout.

The song "Jellyfish Reflector" was referenced in the Homestar Runner short "Sbemail 150?!?"

== Track listing ==
All tracks are written by Robert Pollard and Tobin Sprout unless otherwise noted.

Side A
No.	Title	Writer(s)	Length
1.	"Satellite"		1:43
2.	"Dayton, Ohio / 19 Something & 5"		1:46
3.	"Is She Ever?"		1:04
4.	"My Thoughts Are a Gas" (Fucked Up Version)	Pollard	1:19
5.	"Knock ‘Em Flying"	Pollard	1:05
6.	"Top Chick Silver Chord"		1:23
7.	"Key Losers"		2:28
8.	"Ha Ha Man"		0:40
9.	"Wingtip Repair"		0:59
10.	"At The Farms"		2:31

Side B
No.	Title	Writer(s)	Length
1.	"Unbaited Vicar of Scorched Earth"		2:11
2.	"Optional Bases Opposed"		1:39
3.	"Look, It’s Baseball"		1:22
4.	"Maxwell Jump"		0:47
5.	"The Stir-Crazy Pornographer"		2:17
6.	"158 Years of Beautiful Sex"	Pollard	1:22
7.	"Universal Nurse Finger"		1:05
8.	"Sadness to the End"	Sprout	0:57
9.	"Reptilian Beauty Secrets"	Pollard	1:41

CD & Streaming extra tracks
No.	Title	Writer(s)	Length
1.	"Long as the Block Is Black"	Pollard	1:17
2.	"Jellyfish Reflector"	Kevin Fennell, Mitch Mitchell, Pollard, Sprout	1:34
3.	"The Kite Surfer"	Pollard	1:48
4.	"Girl from the Sun"	Pollard	1:38
5.	"The Candyland Riots"	Pollard	2:08

== Personnel ==
The credits do not give specific instruments played by each individual, but rather list every performer who appeared on the release in any capacity.

=== Guided by Voices ===
- Robert Pollard
- Tobin Sprout
