= The Best of Guided by Voices: Human Amusements at Hourly Rates =

Human Amusements at Hourly Rates

Greatest hits album by Guided by Voices
- Released: November 4, 2003
- Genre: Indie rock
- Label: Matador Records

Guided by Voices chronology
Earthquake Glue (2003)	Human Amusements at Hourly Rates (2003)	Half Smiles of the Decomposed (2004)

Professional ratings
Review scores
Source	Rating
Allmusic	link
Rolling Stone	link
Pitchfork Media	(9.5/10) link

The Best of Guided By Voices: Human Amusements at Hourly Rates is a greatest-hits collection from Dayton, Ohio rock group Guided by Voices. The collection features selections ranging from the early song "Captain's Dead," from Devil Between My Toes to 2003's "The Best of Jill Hives" from Earthquake Glue.

The title Human Amusements at Hourly Rates comes from the 1999 GBV song "In Stitches" off Do the Collapse.

== Track listing ==
All tracks are written by Robert Pollard except where noted

No.	Title	Writer(s)	Album	Length
1.	"A Salty Salute"	Pollard; Tobin Sprout	Alien Lanes (1995)	1:29
2.	"Things I Will Keep"		Do the Collapse (1999)	2:26
3.	"Everywhere With Helicopter"		Universal Truths and Cycles (2002)	2:38
4.	"I Am A Tree"	Doug Gillard	Mag Earwhig! (1997)	4:40
5.	"My Kind of Soldier"		Earthquake Glue (2003)	2:36
6.	"14 Cheerleader Coldfront"	Pollard; Sprout	Propeller (1992)	1:31
7.	"Twilight Campfighter"		Isolation Drills (2001)	3:08
8.	"Echos Myron"		Bee Thousand (1994)	2:38
9.	"Learning To Hunt"		Mag Earwhig! (1997)	2:25
10.	"Bulldog Skin"		Mag Earwhig! (1997)	3:00
11.	"Captain's Dead"		Devil Between My Toes (1987)	2:01
12.	"Tractor Rape Chain"		Bee Thousand (1994)	3:04
13.	"Game of Pricks"		Tigerbomb (1995)	2:15
14.	"To Remake The Young Flyer"	Sprout	Under the Bushes Under the Stars (1996)	1:44
15.	"Hit"		Alien Lanes (1995)	0:23
16.	"Glad Girls"		Isolation Drills (2001)	3:49
17.	"Drinker's Peace"		Same Place The Fly Got Smashed (1990)	1:51
18.	"Surgical Focus"		Do the Collapse (1999)	3:47
19.	"Cut-Out Witch"		Under the Bushes Under the Stars (1996)	3:06
20.	"The Best of Jill Hives"		Earthquake Glue (2003)	2:39
21.	"Hot Freaks"	Pollard; Sprout	Bee Thousand (1994)	1:43
22.	"Shocker in Gloomtown"		The Grand Hour (1993)	1:26
23.	"Chasing Heather Crazy"		Isolation Drills (2001)	2:53
24.	"My Valuable Hunting Knife"		Alien Lanes (1995)	2:01
25.	"The Official Ironmen Rally Song"		Under the Bushes Under the Stars (1996)	2:49
26.	"Non-Absorbing"		Vampire on Titus (1993)	1:35
27.	"Motor Away"	Pollard; Sprout	Single (1995)	2:16
28.	"Teenage FBI"		Wish in One Hand... (1997)	1:38
29.	"Watch Me Jumpstart"		Alien Lanes (1995)	2:25
30.	"Exit Flagger"		Propeller (1992)	2:19
31.	"Back to the Lake"		Universal Truths and Cycles (2002)	2:34
32.	"I Am A Scientist"		Bee Thousand (1994)	2:24
Total length:				77:13
