= Fiction Man =

Studio album by Robert Pollard
- Released: 2004
- Genre: Indie rock
- Label: Fading Captain Series
- Producer: Todd Tobias

Robert Pollard chronology
Motel of Fools (EP) (2003)	Fiction Man (2004)	From a Compound Eye (2006)

Fiction Man is the fourth solo studio album by American indie rock musician Robert Pollard, released in 2004. The songs recorded for this album were written during the same time as the material for Guided by Voices' 2003 release Earthquake Glue. Producer Todd Tobias plays almost every instrument on the album. This album marks a producing relationship between Pollard and Todd Tobias that would continue with Robert's future solo albums, including From a Compound Eye, Normal Happiness and others.

== Track listing ==
1. "Run Son Run"
2. "I Expect a Kill"
3. "Sea of Dead"
4. "Children Come On"
5. "The Louis Armstrong of Rock and Roll"
6. "Losing Usage"
7. "Built to Improve"
8. "Paradise Style"
9. "Conspiracy of Owls"
10. "It's Only Natural"
11. "Trial of Affliction and Light Sleeping"
12. "Every Word in the World"
13. "Night of the Golden Underground"
14. "Their Biggest Win"
