= Superman Was a Rocker =

Superman Was A Rocker

Studio album by Robert Pollard
- Released: January 29, 2008
- Recorded: 1980–2007
- Genre: Rock, indie rock
- Label: Happy Jack Rock Records
- Producer: Robert Pollard, Todd Tobias

Robert Pollard chronology
Coast to Coast Carpet of Love (2007)	Superman Was A Rocker (2008)	Weatherman and Skin Goddess (2008)

Professional ratings
Review scores
Source	Rating
Allmusic	link
Pitchfork Media	5.0/10 link
Pop Matters	link

Superman Was A Rocker is the ninth studio album from singer-songwriter Robert Pollard. It was released on January 29, 2008. Superman Was a Rocker marks the first LP released by Pollard's Happy Jack Rock Records label. It differs from Pollard's past solo albums in that it is very lo-fi in comparison to his more polished releases.

== Background ==
The album was created by adding vocals to previously unused instrumentals, spanning nearly three decades of dormant recordings. The track "Back to the Farm" opens with a radio conversation supposedly between Guided by Voices band members and a southern speaking critic of their music. Many of the GBV band members appear on the recording as a result of the extended periods of the work.

According to the Rockathon Music website:

"Robert Pollard's Superman Was A Rocker is a return to old ways for Bob. This mini-album (13 songs, 30 minutes) finds Bob using recording methods that he hasn't engaged in since the old GBV days."

"Bob recently poured through a bunch of old cassette tapes of his and found some great instrumentals that he either wrote or co-wrote, and never used. He decided to go into the studio and put vocals (and melodies!) over them."

== Track listing ==
1. "Another Man's Blood"
2. "Go Down First"
3. "Back to the Farm" (instrumental)
4. "Substitute Heaven"
5. "Prince Alphabet"
6. "You Drove the Snake Crazy"
7. "Surveillance"
8. "Fascination Attempt"
9. "Love Your Spaceman"
10. "Jumping"
11. "St. Leroy"
12. "Peacock"
13. "More Hot Dogs Please"

== Personnel ==
- Robert Pollard - Vocals, guitar, piano, producer
- Jim Pollard - Bass, drums, guitar,
- Tobin Sprout - Drums
- Mitch Mitchell - Bass, guitar
- John Bert Dodson - Drum machine, guitar

=== Other/production ===
- Kevin March - Engineer, various Instruments
- Todd Tobias - Audio Engineer, Producer, Vocal Engineer
