= Crickets: Best of the Fading Captain Series 1999–2007 =

Compilation album by Robert Pollard
- Released: July 7, 2007
- Genre: Indie rock
- Label: Fading Captain

Robert Pollard chronology
Suitcase 2: American Superdream Wow (2005)	Crickets: Best of the Fading Captain Series 1999–2007 (2007)

Crickets: Best of the Fading Captain Series 1999–2007 is a collection of songs from releases in the Fading Captain series of Dayton, Ohio rock singer-songwriter Robert Pollard. Pollard launched his Fading Captain series of record releases in 1999, eventually releasing 44 works before ending the series in 2007. The compilation Crickets was the 44th and final release in the series. The series included albums, singles, and EPs, and featured collaborations with musicians including Tobin Sprout, Mac McCaughan (Calling Zero), Doug Gillard (Speak Kindly of Your Volunteer Fire Department), and Tommy Keene (Blues and Boogie Shoes).

== Reception ==
Pitchfork rated Crickets 6.0/10, saying it "lacks adequate bait for completists and will confuse and likely put off neophytes."

AllMusic rated the album three out of fives stars, calling the album too often meandering and lacking "the cohesion and charge of even the lesser GBV albums."

PopMatters called Crickets "overstuffed" with throwaway tracks and "some new bonus material that isn't even worth mentioning", but containing "a dozen fantastic songs" and "ten or so other solid tracks."

== CD1 ==
1. Tight Globes – Robert Pollard/Doug Gillard
2. Total Exposure – Airport 5
3. Death of the Party – The Keene Brothers
4. Festival of Death – Circus Devils
5. Break Some Concentration – Psycho And The Birds
6. Beaten by the Target – The Moping Swans
7. Built to Improve – Robert Pollard
8. Flings of the Wastecoat Crowd – Robert Pollard
9. Never Forget Where You Get Them – Go Back Snowball
10. Stifled Man Casino – Airport 5
11. Bull Spears – Circus Devils
12. White Gloves Come Off – Robert Pollard
13. Time Machines – Lexo & The Leapers
14. Alone, Stinking and Unafraid – Lexo & The Leapers
15. Sensational Gravity Boy – Freedom Cruise
16. Dolphins of Color – Circus Devils
17. Fairly Blacking Out – The Takeovers
18. Naked Wall, The – The Keene Brothers
19. Do Something Real – Robert Pollard/Doug Gillard
20. It Is Divine – Go Back Snowball
21. I'm Dirty – Howling Wolf Orchestra
22. However Young They Are – Airport 5
23. Look at Your Life – The Moping Swans
24. Harrison Adams – Robert Pollard
25. All Men Are Freezing – Robert Pollard
26. Sister I Need Wine – Guided by Voices
27. I'm Gonna Miss My Horse – Ellsworth Pollard
28. Butcherman – Psycho

== CD2 ==
1. Zoom (It Happens All Over the World) – Robert Pollard
2. First of an Early Go Getter – Lifeguards
3. Correcto – Circus Devils
4. Pop Zeus – Robert Pollard/Doug Gillard
5. First Spill Is Free – The Takeovers
6. Instrument Beetle – Robert Pollard/Soft Rock Renegades
7. Bunco Men – Elf God
8. Selective Service – Guided by Voices
9. Soldiers of June – Circus Devils
10. Remain Lodging (At Airport 5) – Airport 5
11. Island of Lost Lucys – The Keene Brothers
12. Feathering Clueless (The Exotic Freebird) – Airport 5
13. Suffer the Sun – Psycho And The Birds
14. Vault of Moons, The – Robert Pollard
15. Trial of Affliction and Light Sleeping – Robert Pollard
16. Children Come On – Robert Pollard
17. (No) Hell For Humor – Circus Devils
18. Society Dome – Lifeguards
19. 7th Level Shutdown – Robert Pollard/Soft Rock Renegades
20. Her Noise – Circus Devils
21. Dumbluck Systems Stormfront – Go Back Snowball
22. Frequent Weaver Who Burns – Robert Pollard/Doug Gillard
23. Town of Mirrors – Robert Pollard
24. Powerblessings – Robert Pollard
25. Island Crimes – Robert Pollard
26. Lugnut Blues – Alien Mofo
27. You've Taken Me In – Little Bobby Pop
28. Power of Suck, The – Radiation Feeder
