= Standard Gargoyle Decisions =

Studio album by Robert Pollard
- Released: October 9, 2007
- Recorded: Kent, Ohio
- Genre: Rock, indie rock
- Length: 42:00
- Label: Merge
- Producer: Todd Tobias

Robert Pollard chronology
| Silverfish Trivia (2007) | Standard Gargoyle Decisions (2007) | Coast to Coast Carpet of Love (2007) |

Professional ratings
Review scores
| Source | Rating |
|---|---|
| Pitchfork | 6.6/10 |
| AllMusic | 3/5 stars |

Standard Gargoyle Decisions is singer-songwriter Robert Pollard's seventh release since the break-up of indie-rock band Guided by Voices. It was released October 9, 2007 alongside a second LP, Coast to Coast Carpet of Love. Pollard has described Coast to Coast Carpet of Love as exhibiting pop-sounding overtones, whereas Standard Gargoyle Decisions will feature more 'down and dirty' rock-and-roll. The album leaked on the Merge Records website on September 24, 2007.

This album was nominated for the 2007 Shortlist Music Prize.

== Track listing ==
All tracks written by Robert Pollard

1. "The Killers"
2. "Pill Gone Girl"
3. "Hero Blows the Revolution"
4. "Psycho-Inertia"
5. "Shadow Port"
6. "Lay Me Down"
7. "Butcher Man"
8. "Motion Sickness Ghosts"
9. "I in the World"
10. "Here Comes Garcia"
11. "The Island Lobby"
12. "Folded Claws"
13. "Feel Not Crushed"
14. "Accusations"
15. "Don't Trust Anybody"
16. "Come Here Beautiful"
17. "Spider Eyes"

== Personnel ==
- Robert Pollard: Vocals, Guitar, Composer, Cover art
- Todd Tobias: Production, Engineer, Mixing, Producer
- Kevin Fennel: Intro on "The Killers"
