= Greg Demos =

American musician and lawyer

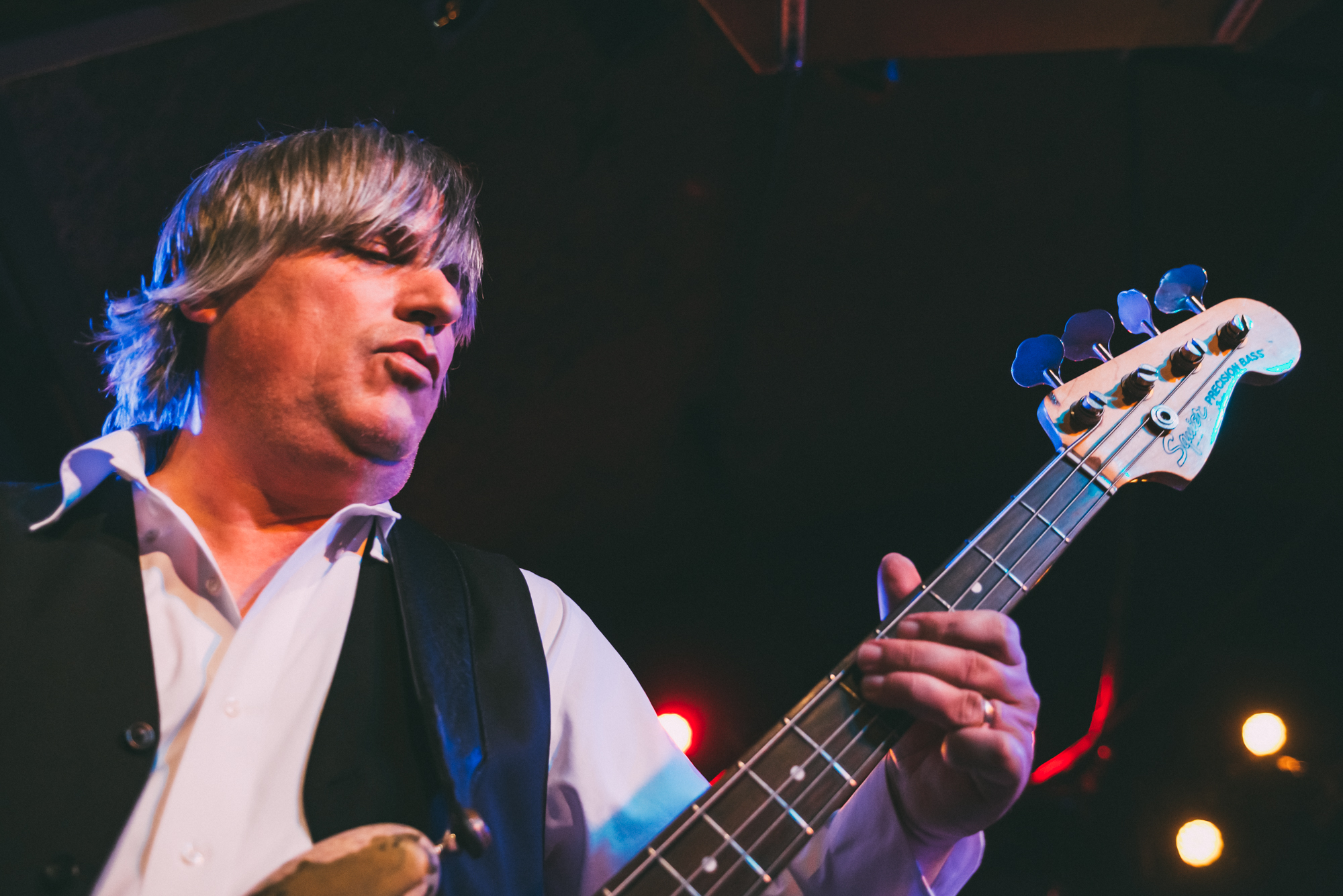
- Demos performing live with Guided by Voices in 2014

Background information
- Genres: Indie rock, lo-fi
- Occupation(s): Lawyer, Musician

Greg Demos is an American musician and lawyer from Dayton, Ohio best known as a long time bassist for Guided by Voices. By trade, he is a partner in the law firm of Fowler, Demos & Stueve in Lebanon, Ohio. Demos has also performed with The New Creatures and 3 Dream Bag.

== Discography ==
=== With the New Creatures ===
- Pedomasoma and Crawl [Cassette EP]
- Walk and Roll [Cassette EP]
- 1984: Media Brainwash
- 1987: Rafter Tag
- 1988: Good Ol' Days [7" Single]
- 2004: Penelope Flowers [collection of previously unreleased material]

=== With 3 Dream Bag ===
- 1993: A Frenzy in Frownland [EP]
- 1995: Bevil Web/3 Dream Bag [Split EP]
- 2001: The Fertile Octogenarian
- 2007: Memory Garden

=== With Guided by Voices ===
- 1990: Same Place the Fly Got Smashed
- 1992: Propeller
- 1994: Bee Thousand
- 1994: I Am a Scientist [EP]
- 1995: Alien Lanes
- 1995: Box [Box Set]
- 1999: Do the Collapse
- 2000: Hold On Hope [EP]
- 2000: Suitcase: Failed Experiments and Trashed Aircraft [Box Set]
- 2000: Briefcase (Suitcase Abridged: Drinks and Deliveries)
- 2001: Daredevil Stamp Collector: Do The Collapse B-sides [EP]
- 2001: The Who Went Home And Cried [DVD] (Documents the night of Demos' final Guided by Voices show)
- 2002: Some Drinking Implied [DVD]
- 2003: Hardcore UFOs: Revelations, Epiphanies and Fast Food in the Western Hemisphere [Box Set]
- 2005: Suitcase 2: American Superdream Wow [Box Set]
- 2005: Briefcase 2 (Suitcase 2 Abridged - The Return of Milko Waif)
- 2005: The Electrifying Conclusion [DVD]
- 2009: Suitcase 3: Up We Go Now
- 2012: Let's Go Eat the Factory
- 2012: Class Clown Spots a UFO
- 2012: The Bears for Lunch
- 2013: English Little League
- 2014: Motivational Jumpsuit
- 2014: Cool Planet
- 2015: Suitcase Four: Captain Kangaroo Won the War

=== With Robert Pollard/Fading Captain Series ===
- 1999: Kid Marine (Robert Pollard)
- 2001: Choreographed Man of War (Robert Pollard & His Soft Rock Renegades)
- 2003: Motel of Fools (Robert Pollard)
- 2005: Lightninghead to Coffeepot (Moping Swans)
- 2007: Crickets: Best of the Fading Captain Series 1999–2007
- 2009: The Planets are Blasted (Boston Spaceships)
- 2013: Clouds On The Polar Landscape (Sunflower Logic)
- 2013: Force Fields At Home (Teenage Guitar)
