= Relaxation of the Asshole =

Live album by Robert Pollard
- Released: 2005
- Genre: Comedy
- Length: 40:12
- Label: Yuk Yuk Motherfucker Production

Robert Pollard chronology
Zoom EP (2005)	Relaxation of the Asshole (2005)	From a Compound Eye (2006)

Professional ratings
Review scores
Source	Rating
Pitchfork Media	((1)0.0) link

Relaxation of the Asshole is a live comedy album by Robert Pollard. All of its tracks are outtakes from his onstage banter at various concerts. It was given a rating of "(1)0.0" in a review by Pitchfork Media, giving it a dual rating of 0.0 and 10.0.

== Track listing ==
1. "Do You Like Rim Rock?" 1:58
2. "They Call Me the Kid" 2:00
3. "The Answer" 0:56
4. "We Don't Do Technology" 2:36
5. "Hopeless, Pathetic Alcoholics" 0:59
6. "What a Mother Does for Her Son" 1:49
7. "Funk Zeus" 0:59
8. "Whiskey Shits" 0:43
9. "Bozo the Fucking Clown" 1:43
10. "Cocker, Meatloaf and Daltrey" 1:24
11. "Brownie Cop" 1:27
12. "What Is Tricky Woo?" 2:18
13. "Space Tractor" 0:39
14. "The "Are You Old Enough to Get Beer" Game Part I" 1:33
15. "The "Are You Old Enough to Get Beer" Game Part II" 1:49
16. "Where the Beer Flows Like Wine/8 to 5" 1:32
17. "They Might Look Good but They Ain't Good" 0:46
18. "Money" 1:41
19. "Another Dead Soldier" 1:00
20. "In Rock 'n' Roll You Never Lose" 3:57
21. "Thank You" 0:30
22. "We're the Rock 'n' Roll Petrified Forest/The Freaks vs. The Jocks" 4:22
23. "Is There a Grandfather Clause for People Who Need a Cigarette Really Bad?" 1:28
24. "My Brother’s a Better Guitar Player Than Joan Jett" 1:35
25. "Here's the Plan: Encore" 0:28
