= Music for 'Bubble' =

Soundtrack album by Robert Pollard
- Released: 2005
- Genre: Rock and roll, indie rock
- Length: 11:49
- Label: Fading Captain Series/Luna

Robert Pollard chronology
Fiction Man (2004)	Music for 'Bubble' (2005)

Music for 'Bubble' is an album by Robert Pollard, released in 2005. It collects his score for the film Bubble directed by Steven Soderbergh.

== Background ==
Music for 'Bubble is Pollard's first film music release. Pollard made contact with Soderbergh after the director mentioned in an interview his love for Pollard's music. Previously, Soderbergh had used a song from Pollard's band Guided by Voices in the closing credits of his film Full Frontal and had written an introduction to the book "Guided by Voices: A Brief History."

In 2004, Soderbergh attended a show on the Guided by Voices farewell tour, The Electrifying Conclusion, where the two met. Initially, Soderbergh was inspired by the film's setting in Ohio, where Pollard was based, to ask the musician for a song to go with a specific bar scene. However, Pollard ended up sending Soderbergh a CD with 47 new songs, which the director picked from.

== Track listing ==
All songs written by Robert Pollard

1. "All Men Are Freezing" – 2:14
2. "747 Ego" – 2:07
3. "Boring About – 1:51
4. "Search-light Pickups" – 1:28
5. "I'm No Child" – 2:02
6. "747 Ego (Oh Yeah)" – 2:07
