= In Shop We Build Electric Chairs: Professional Music by Nightwalker 1984–1993 =

Studio album by Nightwalker
- Released: 1999
- Genre: Alternative rock, Indie, Lo-fi
- Label: Fading Captain Series

Professional ratings
Review scores
Source	Rating
AllMusic	4/5 stars

In Shop We Build Electric Chairs: Professional Music by Nightwalker 1984–1993 is an album released in 1999 by Nightwalker, a pseudonym used by Robert Pollard for archival Guided by Voices recordings.

== Track listing ==
All songs written by Robert Pollard unless otherwise noted.

1. "Drum Solo" – 0:55
2. "The Fink Swan (Swims Away)" (R. Pollard, Jim Pollard) – 2:46
3. "Kenneth Ray" (R. Pollard, J. Pollard, Mitch Mitchell) – 2:54
4. "Dogwood Grains" – 1:07
5. "Amazed" (R. Pollard, J. Pollard) – 2:23
6. "Signifying UFO" – 0:20
7. "Ceramic Cock Einstein" – 6:08
8. "U235" – 0:23
9. "Weird Rivers & Sapphire Sun" – 2:53
10. "Trashed Canned Goods" – 1:40
11. "Those Little Bastards Will Bite" – 11:08

== Personnel ==
- Robert Pollard – lead vocals and instruments
- Jim Pollard – instruments
- Mitch Mitchell – instruments
- Tobin Sprout – guitar on "Trashed Canned Goods"
- Dan Toohey – bass on "Trashed Canned Goods"
