= Big Trouble =

Big Trouble may refer to:

== Music ==
- Big Trouble (band), an American pop group 1985–1988
- Big Trouble (Big Trouble album), 1988
- Big Trouble (Hazzard Hotrods album) or the title song, 2000
- Big Trouble (Outasight album) or the title song, 2015
- Big Trouble, an album by Hollywood Monsters, 2014

== Other uses ==
- Big Trouble (1986 film), an American comedy film directed by John Cassavetes
- Big Trouble (2002 film), an American comedy film based on Dave Barry's novel (see below)
- Big Trouble (Lukas book), a 1997 non-fiction book by J. Anthony Lukas
- Big Trouble (novel), a 1999 novel by Dave Barry
- Big Trouble, a merchant ship originally named USCGC Dione

== See also ==
- Big Trouble in Little China
  - Big Trouble in Little China (soundtrack)
  - Big Trouble in Little China (video game)
