= Peep-Hole =

Peep-Hole may refer to:

- Peephole, a small opening to look through a door
- "Peep-Hole", a song by Guided by Voices from their 1994 album Bee Thousand
