= Silverfish Trivia =

EP by Robert Pollard
- Released: April 17, 2007
- Genres: Rock, Indie rock
- Label: Prom is Coming
- Producer: Todd Tobias

Robert Pollard chronology
Normal Happiness (2006)	Silverfish Trivia (2007)	Standard Gargoyle Decisions (2007)

Silverfish Trivia is an extended play by indie rock singer-songwriter Robert Pollard. It was released April 17, 2007 and is a 22-minute, seven-song mini-LP.

== Track listing ==
1. "Come Outside" (1:18)
2. "Circle Saw Boys Club" (2:54)
3. "Wickerman Smile" (2:01)
4. "Touched to Be Sure" (4:20)
5. "Waves, Etc." (1:31)
6. "Cats Love a Parade" (7:56)
7. "Speak in Many Colors" (2:09)
