= Coast to Coast Carpet of Love =

Studio album by Robert Pollard
- Released: October 9, 2007
- Genre: Rock, indie rock
- Label: Merge
- Producer: Todd Tobias

Robert Pollard chronology
Standard Gargoyle Decisions (2007)	Coast to Coast Carpet of Love (2007)	Superman Was a Rocker (2008)

Professional ratings
Review scores
Source	Rating
Pitchfork	7.0/10 link

Coast to Coast Carpet of Love is singer-songwriter Robert Pollard's 8th solo release. It was released October 9, 2007, alongside Standard Gargoyle Decisions. In addition, the album was pressed on 180 gram vinyl in a limited edition of 1,500. The album leaked September 24, 2007.

At the December 1, 2007, show at Southgate House supporting the album, Pollard claimed he talked to Tommy Keene on the phone and told him the new album was Coast to Coast Carpet of Blood, though Keene misheard "Blood" for "Love". When Pollard corrected him, he claimed it should be "Love" because it was "groovier". The title stuck.

== Track listing ==
1. "Our Gaze"
2. "Count Us In"
3. "Exactly What Words Mean"
4. "Current Desperation (Angels Speak of Nothing)"
5. "Dumb Lady"
6. "Rud Fins"
7. "Customer's Throat"
8. "Miles Under the Skin"
9. "Penumbra"
10. "Slow Hamilton"
11. "Look Is What You Have"
12. "I Clap for Strangers"
13. "Life of a Wife"
14. "Youth Leagues"
15. "When We Were Slaves"
16. "Nicely Now"
