= Lord of the Birdcage =

Studio album by Robert Pollard
- Released: June 7, 2011
- Genre: Indie rock
- Label: Guided by Voices Inc.
- Producer: Todd Tobias

Robert Pollard chronology
Space City Kicks (2011)	Lord of the Birdcage (2011)	Mouseman Cloud (2012)

Professional ratings
Aggregate scores
Source	Rating
Metacritic	(80|100)
Review scores
Source	Rating
Allmusic	4/5 stars
A.V. Club	B

Lord of the Birdcage is the 16th full-length solo studio album from singer-songwriter Robert Pollard, released on June 7, 2011.

In this album, Pollard uses different songwriting techniques by converting written poems into songs.

== Critical reception ==
In a 2011 review, Steven Hyden of The A.V. Club said Lord of the Birdcage "probably won't be this year's 'new' Robert Pollard record for long, but it might very well be the one worth remembering."

== Track listing ==
1. "Smashed Middle Finger"
2. "Aspersion"
3. "Dunce Codex"
4. "Garden Smarm"
5. "You Can't Challenge Forward Progress"
6. "In a Circle"
7. "You Sold Me Quickly"
8. "The Focus (Burning)"
9. "Ribbon of Fat"
10. "Silence Before Violence"
11. "Holy Fire"
12. "Ash Ript Telecopter"
