= Under the Bushes Under the Stars =

Studio album by Guided by Voices
- Released: March 26, 1996
- Recorded: 1995
- Genre: Indie rock
- Length: 55:45 (38:01 / 17:44); 61:20 (with bonus tracks)
- Label: Matador
- Producer: John Shough; Doug Easley; Davis McCain; Kim Deal^{[A]}; Steve Albini^{[B]}

Guided by Voices chronology
Alien Lanes (1995)	Under the Bushes Under the Stars (1996)	Tonics & Twisted Chasers (1996)

Singles from Under the Bushes Under the Stars
- 1. "The Official Ironmen Rally Song" Released: February 27, 1996; 2. "Cut-Out Witch" Released: June 17, 1996

Professional ratings
Review scores
Source	Rating
AllMusic	3/5 stars
Alternative Press	4/5 stars
Entertainment Weekly	B+
NME	8/10
Rolling Stone	3/5 stars
Spin	6/10

Under the Bushes Under the Stars is the ninth Guided by Voices album overall, and the last until 2012's Let's Go Eat the Factory to feature the "classic" lineup including Tobin Sprout, Mitch Mitchell, and Kevin Fennell in addition to leader Robert Pollard.

== Writing and recording ==
According to Robert Pollard, the album had a loose concept around such themes as "good versus evil" and materialism.

Under the Bushes Under the Stars saw Guided by Voices recording in 24 track studios rather than their customary 4 track. However, Pollard was adamant on the album retaining their trademark sound, which entailed "lo-fi techniques" such as singing through guitar amplifiers. Sessions for the album were reportedly arduous, spread as they were across at least four studios and as many sets of producers, and many titles and configurations were vetted before a final sequence was reached.

The final six tracks on the CD do not appear on the album's back cover. These tracks, which were included as a separate 12" EP in the vinyl edition, were not originally included in the completed album sequence, having been dropped from earlier proposed versions of the album, but were included at the request of Matador label executives who regretted their exclusion.

== Track listing ==
All songs written by Robert Pollard unless otherwise noted.

=== Side A ===
1. "Man Called Aerodynamics" – 2:01
2. "Rhine Jive Click" – 1:34
3. "Cut-Out Witch" – 3:04
4. "Burning Flag Birthday Suit" – 2:22
5. "The Official Ironmen Rally Song" – 2:48
6. "To Remake the Young Flyer" (Tobin Sprout) – 1:43
7. "No Sky" – 2:03
8. "Bright Paper Werewolves" – 1:14
9. "Lord of Overstock" – 2:34

=== Side B ===
10. "Your Name Is Wild" – 2:01
11. "Ghosts of a Different Dream" – 2:30
12. "Acorns & Orioles" – 2:12
13. "Look at Them" – 2:27
14. "The Perfect Life" (Sprout) – 0:59
15. "Underwater Explosions" – 2:02
16. "Atom Eyes" (Sprout) – 1:42
17. "Don't Stop Now" – 2:39
18. "Office of Hearts" – 2:06

=== Side C ===
19. "Big Boring Wedding" – 3:43
20. "It's Like Soul Man" (Sprout) – 2:09
21. "Drag Days" – 2:50

=== Side D ===
22. "Sheetkickers" (Jim Pollard, Robert Pollard) – 3:17
23. "Redmen and Their Wives" – 3:55
24. "Take to the Sky" – 1:50

=== 1998 bonus tracks ===
25. "Finks" – 2:28
26. "The Finest Joke Is Upon Us" – 3:09

== Personnel ==
=== Guided by Voices ===
- Robert Pollard – lead vocals, guitar, drums, bass guitar
- Tobin Sprout – bass guitar, guitar, vocals
- Kevin Fennell – drums
- James Greer – bass guitar
- Mitch Mitchell – guitar

=== Additional musicians ===
- Tripp Lamkins – guitar
- John Shough – piano
- Shelby Bryant – strings

=== Technical ===
- Mark Ohe – cover artwork
- Robert Pollard – cover artwork
- Greg Calbi – mastering

== Notes ==
- A Tracks "The Official Ironmen Rally Song", "Don't Stop Now", "Big Boring Wedding", "Drag Days" and "Redmen and Their Wives" were produced by Kim Deal.
- B Tracks "It's Like Soul Man" and "Sheetkickers" were produced by Steve Albini.
