= Big Trouble (Hazzard Hotrods album) =

Studio album by Hazzard Hotrods
- Released: 2000 (2005)
- Genre: Alternative rock, Indie, Lo-fi
- Label: Fading Captain Series

Big Trouble is an album by the Hazzard Hotrods, a recording of informal 1990 performance by Robert Pollard, Tobin Sprout, Mitch Mitchell, and Larry Kellar, released in 2000 (re-released as Bigger Trouble in 2005).

== Track listing ==
All songs written by Robert Pollard.

Side A

1. A Farewell To Arms – 2.14
2. The Lawless 90's – 2.31
3. 39 Steps – 4.31
4. Tit For Tat – 3.11
5. Saboutage – 3.51

Side B

1. Big Trouble – 4.41
2. Runaway – 2.32
3. Get Dirty – 3.58
4. Clue – 4.15
5. Solid Gold – 4.10

Bonus Tracks on 2005 released Bigger Trouble

1. Walk In The Sun – 2.55
2. The Man Who Knew Too Much – 4.53
3. A Star Is Born – 3.09
4. Tell Me Why – 6.27
5. Rat Infested Motels Of Dayton – 0.10
6. Really Gonna Love Me Now – 3.07
7. We Want Miles (Of Land) – 4.24

== Personnel ==
- Robert Pollard – lead vocals
- Tobin Sprout – guitar, keyboards
- Mitch Mitchell – bass
- Larry Keller – drums
