= Kevin Fennell =

American drummer

- Born: March 13, 1959 (age 67)
- Origin: Dayton, Ohio, U.S.
- Genres: Rock, indie rock, pop
- Instrument: Drums
- Years active: Since 1983

Kevin Fennell (born March 13, 1959) is an American musician from Dayton, Ohio, best known as the original drummer for the indie rock band Guided by Voices.

== Career ==
Fennell joined the original trio composition of the group, He performed with the band between 1983 and 1996, and since the reunion of the "Classic Lineup" in 2010. He appeared to perform at the band's "final" Dayton performance in 2004.

He did not, however, appear at their final concert overall in Chicago in December 2004. Fennell has also performed drums on Tobin Sprout's first two solo albums.

Fennell rejoined the revived band in 2010 for a reunion tour and later album releases Let's Go Eat the Factory and Class Clown Spots a UFO. In October 2013 Fennell reported having resigned from the band. The band's frontman Robert Pollard reported having fired Fennell. Both agreed the split happened following a disagreement related to Fennell's attempt to sell the drum kit used to record Bee Thousand and other albums for $55,000.
