= From a Compound Eye =

Studio album by Robert Pollard
- Released: January 24, 2006
- Genre: Indie rock
- Label: Merge
- Producer: Todd Tobias

Robert Pollard chronology
| Fiction Man (2004) | From a Compound Eye (2006) | Normal Happiness (2006) |

Professional ratings
Review scores
| Source | Rating |
|---|---|
| AllMusic | link |
| Mojo | 4/5 stars |
| The Onion | link |
| Pitchfork | (7.1/10) link |
| Spin | link |
| Transform Online | link |

From a Compound Eye is the fifth solo studio album by American musician Robert Pollard, released in 2006. Though Pollard had already released several albums under his own name, this album, being the first released after the 2004 dissolution of his longtime vehicle Guided by Voices, was considered to be the official commencement of his solo career.

For the album, Pollard drew on his backlog of unreleased material, as well as newly composed songs. Rather than record with the band setup typical of GbV recordings, Pollard recorded basic guitar and vocal tracks within a matter of days, and left instrumental work to be overdubbed almost entirely by collaborator Todd Tobias who produced the last few GbV LPs. Clarifying the title, Pollard described the album as "Massive...Epic...it's all over the place and sees in all directions at once"

It was the first Robert Pollard solo release to chart on any Billboard chart, peaking at No. 38 on the Heatseekers chart and No. 41 on the Top Independent Albums chart.

== Track listing ==
1. "Gold" – 3:02
2. "Field Jacket Blues" – 1:49
3. "Dancing Girls and Dancing Men" – 2:38
4. "A Flowering Orphan" – 1:50
5. "The Right Thing" – 4:36
6. "U.S. Mustard Company" – 2:52
7. "The Numbered Head" – 5:10
8. "I'm a Widow" – 3:37
9. "Fresh Threats, Salad Shooters and Zip Guns" – 1:51
10. "Kick Me and Cancel" – 2:08
11. "Other Dogs Remain" – 2:41
12. "Kensington Cradle" – 1:52
13. "Love Is Stronger Than Witchcraft" – 4:12
14. "Hammer in Your Eyes" – 1:42
15. "50 Year Old Baby" – 2:13
16. "I Surround You Naked" – 2:41
17. "Cock of the Rainbow" – 1:43
18. "Conqueror of the Moon" – 5:04
19. "Blessed in an Open Head" – 2:55
20. "A Boy in Motion" – 1:37
21. "Denied" – 2:39
22. "Lightshow" – 2:29
23. "I'm a Strong Lion" – 1:08
24. "Payment for the Babies" – 2:03
25. "Kingdom Without" – 2:29
26. "Recovering" – 3:28
