= Todd Tobias =

American musician and record producer

- Born: 1967 (age 58–59)
- Origin: Akron, Ohio, United States
- Occupations: Record producer, musician
- Instruments: drums, bass guitar, 6-string guitar, keys, samples
- Years active: 2001–present
- Labels: Hidden Shoal Recordings, Tiny Room Records

Todd Tobias (born 1967) is an American multi-instrumentalist and record producer, best known for his work with Robert Pollard and his band Guided by Voices. Other projects include Circus Devils, Kramies, The Library Is On Fire, and musical theater composer and lyricist George Griggs.

Tobias began producing albums in 2002, first working with indie rock pioneers Guided By Voices on their album Universal Truths And Cycles. One year earlier in 2001, Tobias joined Guided By Voices front man Robert Pollard and brother Tim Tobias in the psychedelic rock trio Circus Devils.

In 2012, Tobias began recording solo albums of instrumental, atmospheric mood music ranging in style from ambient to post-rock. Todd's debut album Medicine Show, released on Hidden Shoal Recordings. has been described as "a multi-faceted instrumental opus, evoking a shadowy steampunk dystopia."

In 2013, Tobias released I RAZOR, a soundtrack album for the experimental film of the same name, followed by Impossible Cities in 2014 and Tristes Tropiques in 2015. Todd's EP Moorea was featured in John Diliberto's NPR program Echoes' top 25 in September, 2015.

In 2018, Tobias joined with English vocalist and songwriter Chloe March on the ambient album Amialluma, on which vocalist March invented a language to accompany Tobias' music. Also in 2018, the self-titled debut from the psychedelic rock duo Moonchy & Tobias was released, featuring music composed by Tobias and vocals/lyrics by Italian vocalist Pat Moonchy. Other collaborations include The World Of Dust with Dutch musician Stefan Breuer, and Brother Earth with Steve Five.

In 2019, Tobias authored the book Circus Devils: See You Inside.

== Discography ==
=== Albums and EPs ===
- Medicine Show (2012)
- Night Above Ground (2012)
- I Razor (2013)
- Impossible Cities (2014)
- Impossible Cities 2 (2014)
- Tristes Tropiques (2015)
- Moorea (2015)
- Gila Man (2016)
- Massabu Evening Entertainments (2018)
- Amialluma (with Chloe March) (2018)
- First Man on the Rock (2024)
- Blue Mansions (2025)
- Ammon and Goam (2026)

== Bibliography ==
- Circus Devils: See You Inside (2019) (Tiny Room)

== Discography for Todd Tobias as producer/ performer/ writer ==
2001:
Circus Devils: Ringworm Interiors

2002:
Guided by Voices: Universal Truths and Cycles
Circus Devils: The Harold Pig Memorial
Guided by Voices: The Pipe Dreams of Instant Prince Whippet

2003:
Guided by Voices: Earthquake Glue

2004:
Guided by Voices: Half Smiles of the Decomposed
Robert Pollard: Fiction Man
Clouds Forming Crowns: All the Pharmacies
Circus Devils: Pinball Mars

2005:
The Celebrity Pilots: Beneath the Pavement, a Beach!
Clouds Forming Crowns: self-titled
Circus Devils: FIVE
The Moping Swans: Lightning Head to Coffee Pot

2006:
Robert Pollard: From a Compound Eye
Robert Pollard: Normal Happiness
Brian Lisik: Happiness is Boring
Clouds Forming Crowns: Race to the Blackout
Psycho and the Birds: All that is Holy
Psycho and the Birds: Check your Zoo EP

2007:
Circus Devils: Sgt. Disco
Robert Pollard: Standard Gargoyle Decisions
Robert Pollard: Coast to Coast Carpet of Love
Robert Pollard: Silverfish Trivia
Psycho and the Birds: We've Moved
The Celebrity Pilots: Spooky Action
The Library is on Fire: Cassette
George Griggs: Transmitter Man
Coffinberry: God Dam Dogs
Humphry Clinker: What’s the Story With the Knife?
The Sorrys: The Last Clear Thought Before You Fall Backwards

2008:
Robert Pollard: Robert Pollard Is Off to Business
Circus Devils: ATAXIA
Slark Martyr: Cave in the A-Frame
Kramies: Golden Like a New Thing
The Softrocks: Summer Apocalypse
The Frozen Hellsicles: Oh No Wait a Minute...
Humphry Clinker: Among Cutting Threads EP
Slark Martyr: Imagination and a Pile of Dirt

2009:
Robert Pollard: The Crawling Distance
Robert Pollard: Elephant Jokes
Circus Devils: Gringo
The Sleeptalkers: Back to Earth
Kramies: Castle of Ghosts
The No Real Need: Thistles Where We Slept
Ceiling Star: New Advances in the Field of Obsolescence

2010:
Robert Pollard: Moses on a Snail
Robert Pollard: We All Got Out of the Army
Circus Devils: Mother Skinny
The Celebrity Pilots: Hawks of the Lesser Antilles
The Library is on Fire: Magic Bumrush Heartz
Brother Earth: Pajama Party
Clouds Forming Crowns: Ouija Board Taxman
Hospital garden: Hospital garden

2011:
Robert Pollard: Lord of the Birdcage
Robert Pollard: Space City Kicks
Circus Devils: Capsized!
Clouds Forming Crowns: Allowing Thunderhead
The Library is on Fire: Works On Paper
The Flower Machine: Lavender Lane

2012:
Robert Pollard: Jack Sells The Cow
Robert Pollard: Mouseman Cloud
Guided by Voices: The Bears for Lunch
Guided by Voices: Class Clown Spots a UFO
Kramies:The European
The No Real Need: Nonlocal Motives
Brother Earth: Brother Earth III
Scarcity Of Tanks: Ohio Captives
Johnny Render: Rendervoux

2013:
Robert Pollard: Blazing Gentlemen
Robert Pollard: Honey Locust Honky Tonk
Kramies: The Wooden Heart
Circus Devils: When Machines Attack
Circus Devils: My Mind Has Seen the White Trick
King Pedestrian: King Pedestrian

2014:
Circus Devils: "Escape"
Brother Earth: "Positive Haywires"

2015:
Robert Pollard: Faulty Superheroes
Circus Devils: Stomping Grounds

The World Of Dust: Womb Realm 

The Flower Machine: Tangerines and Opium Trees

2017:
Circus Devils: Laughs Last

2018:
Moonchy & Tobias: self-titled

2019:
The World Of Dust: Samsara
Moonchy & Tobias: Atmosfere

2020:
Moonchy & Tobias: III

2021:
The World Of Dust: True Sound
Moonchy & Tobias: Venus Mirror

2022:
Moonchy & Tobias: Golem

2023:
Circus Devils: Squeeze the Needle
Moonchy & Tobias: Wild Eye
