= Half Smiles of the Decomposed =

Studio album by Guided by Voices
- Released: August 24, 2004
- Recorded: December 2003
- Genre: Indie rock
- Length: 42:23
- Label: Matador
- Producer: Todd Tobias and Guided By Voices

Guided by Voices chronology
Earthquake Glue (2003)	Half Smiles of the Decomposed (2004)	Let's Go Eat the Factory (2011)

Professional ratings
Review scores
Source	Rating
Allmusic	link
Pitchfork Media	(7.0/10) link
Rolling Stone	link
Tiny Mix Tapes	link

Half Smiles of the Decomposed is the fifteenth album by Dayton, Ohio rock group Guided by Voices. It was the final album by the band before their 2010 reformation. Pollard said, "It got to the point with this album that I’d come to a pinnacle in the way I wanted to make a record with Guided By Voices and I really didn’t know what direction to take it in after that. So for me it really did feel like the last album."

== Track listing ==
All songs written by Robert Pollard.

1. "Everybody Thinks I'm a Raincloud (When I'm Not Looking)" – 3:20
2. "Sleep Over Jack" – 3:04
3. "Girls of Wild Strawberries" – 2:30
4. "Gonna Never Have to Die" – 2:17
5. "Window of My World" – 2:58
6. "The Closets of Henry" – 2:31
7. "Tour Guide at the Winston Churchill Memorial" – 3:02
8. "Asia Minor" – 2:23
9. "Sons of Apollo" – 4:04
10. "Sing for Your Meat" – 4:03
11. "Asphyxiated Circle" – 2:50
12. "A Second Spurt of Growth" – 2:46
13. "(S)Mothering and Coaching" – 3:21
14. "Huffman Prairie Flying Field" – 3:14

== Personnel ==
The credits do not give specific instruments played by each individual, but rather list every performer who appeared on the release in any capacity.

=== GBV ===
- Robert Pollard – Vocals, composer
- Chris Slusarenko – Performer
- Doug Gillard – Performer
- Kevin March – Performer
- Nate Farley – Performer

=== Other/production ===
- Todd Tobias – Production, engineer, mixing, ambience
