= Let's Go Eat the Factory =

Studio album by Guided by Voices
- Released: December 20, 2011
- Recorded: 2011
- Genres: Indie rock; lo-fi
- Length: 41:44
- Labels: Guided by Voices Inc. (US); Fire (UK)
- Producer: Guided by Voices

Guided by Voices chronology
Half Smiles of the Decomposed (2004)	Let's Go Eat the Factory (2011)	Class Clown Spots a UFO (2012)

Professional ratings
Review scores
Source	Rating
AllMusic	3.5/5 stars
Paste Magazine	(8.4/10)
Pop 'stache	3/5 stars
Pitchfork	(6.9/10)
Consequence of Sound	B

Let's Go Eat the Factory is the 16th album by Dayton, Ohio rock group Guided by Voices. The album was first released on December 20, 2011, digitally through the iTunes Store, then by mail-order on January 1, 2012, and finally released retail on January 24, 2012. The album is the first since their 2004 dissolution, and the first to feature the band's classic lineup since 1996's Under the Bushes Under the Stars. The album was produced by the band and recorded at the homes of members Tobin Sprout, Mitch Mitchell, and Greg Demos. As with previous albums, it features the band's famously lo-fi 4-track sound as well as more modern production. It is also the first Guided by Voices album to be released under the Guided by Voices, Inc. label.

The album debuted at No. 17 on Billboard's Top Heatseekers chart and No. 24 on Billboard's Tastemaker Albums chart. It eventually reached No. 8 on Heatseekers, No. 5 on Tastemaker Albums and No. 35 on Billboard's Top Independent Albums chart.

== Track listing ==
All tracks are written by Robert Pollard, except where noted.

No.	Title	Length
1.	"Laundry and Lasers"	2:38
2.	"The Head" (R. Pollard, Jim Pollard)	1:10
3.	"Doughnut for a Snowman"	1:44
4.	"Spiderfighter" (Tobin Sprout)	3:35
5.	"Hang Mr. Kite"	1:40
6.	"God Loves Us" (Mitch Mitchell, Jim Pollard, R. Pollard, Sprout)	1:28
7.	"The Unsinkable Fats Domino"	1:53
8.	"Who Invented the Sun" (Sprout)	1:21
9.	"The Big Hat and Toy Show" (Greg Demos, J. Pollard, R. Pollard)	2:12
10.	"Imperial Racehorsing"	2:54
11.	"How I Met My Mother"	1:02
12.	"Waves" (Sprout)	3:22
13.	"My Europa"	1:48
14.	"Chocolate Boy"	1:31
15.	"The Things That Never Need" (Sprout)	1:11
16.	"Either Nelson"	2:04
17.	"Cyclone Utilities (Remember Your Birthday)" (Mitchell, R. Pollard)	2:50
18.	"Old Bones" (Sprout)	2:03
19.	"Go Rolling Home" (Demos, R. Pollard)	0:34
20.	"The Room Taking Shape" (Demos, R. Pollard)	0:43
21.	"We Won't Apologize for the Human Race"	4:01
Total length:		41:44
