= Alien Lanes =

Studio album by Guided by Voices
- Released: April 4, 1995
- Recorded: 1994
- Studio: Tobin Sprout's home studio (Dayton, Ohio)
- Genres: Indie rock; lo-fi; power pop
- Length: 41:15
- Label: Matador
- Producer: Robert Pollard

Guided by Voices chronology
Bee Thousand (1994)	Alien Lanes (1995)	Under the Bushes Under the Stars (1996)

Singles from Alien Lanes
- 1. "Motor Away" Released: June 6, 1995

Alien Lanes is the eighth full-length album by American lo-fi band Guided by Voices, released on April 4, 1995.

The album was GBV's first release with Matador Records. According to James Greer's book Guided by Voices: A Brief History: Twenty-One Years of Hunting Accidents in the Forests of Rock and Roll the advance for the record was close to a hundred thousand dollars, one of the more expensive deals in Matador's history. In contrast to the lucrative deal, Greer mentions that "The cost for recording Alien Lanes, if you leave out the beer, was about ten dollars."

== Reception ==
Professional ratings
Review scores
Source	Rating
AllMusic	3.5/5 stars
Entertainment Weekly	B+
The Guardian	3/4 stars
Pitchfork	9.2/10
Rolling Stone	4/5 stars
The Rolling Stone Album Guide	3.5/5 stars
Spin (1995)	7/10
Spin (2006)	4.5/5 stars

In a contemporary review of Alien Lanes, Matt Diehl of Rolling Stone described the album's music as "hooky rock that infuses songwriting smarts and a love of melody with a sometimes spiky, sometimes whimsical sense of experimentation". Caroline Sullivan of The Guardian gave the album a positive review, stating that "Pollard's songs are gems that stay just this side of self-conscious eccentricity". Sullivan noted the songs' lengths, stating that they were "just enough time for Pollard to wheeze a few oblique lines and guitarist Tobin Sprout to trace out a raucous melody." Robert Christgau of The Village Voice was less complimentary, giving the album a "dud" rating.

== Legacy ==
Mark Deming of AllMusic described Alien Lanes as being similar to Bee Thousand, although without "as many obvious masterpieces" and "fewer obvious mistakes."

Pitchfork placed Alien Lanes at No. 27 on its list of the "Top 100 Albums of the 1990s". Magnet named it the best album of 1995. The album was included in the book 1001 Albums You Must Hear Before You Die.

== Track listing ==
All songs written by Robert Pollard unless otherwise noted.

1. "A Salty Salute" (R. Pollard, Tobin Sprout) – 1:29
2. "Evil Speakers" – 0:58
3. "Watch Me Jumpstart" – 2:24
4. "They're Not Witches" (Greg Demos, Jim Pollard, R. Pollard) – 0:51
5. "As We Go Up, We Go Down" – 1:37
6. "(I Wanna Be a) Dumbcharger" – 1:13
7. "Game of Pricks" – 1:33
8. "The Ugly Vision" – 1:34
9. "A Good Flying Bird" (Sprout) – 1:07
10. "Cigarette Tricks" (Demos, J. Pollard, R. Pollard, Sprout) – 0:18
11. "Pimple Zoo" – 0:42
12. "Big Chief Chinese Restaurant" (J. Pollard, R. Pollard) – 0:56
13. "Closer You Are" – 1:56
14. "Auditorium" (R. Pollard, Sprout) – 1:02
15. "Motor Away" (R. Pollard, Sprout) – 2:06
16. "Hit" – 0:23
17. "My Valuable Hunting Knife" – 2:00
18. "Gold Hick" – 0:30
19. "King and Caroline" (R. Pollard, Sprout) – 1:36
20. "Striped White Jets" – 2:15
21. "Ex-Supermodel" (R. Pollard, Sprout) – 1:06
22. "Blimps Go 90" – 1:40
23. "Strawdogs" (Sprout) – 1:17
24. "Chicken Blows" – 2:21
25. "Little Whirl" (Sprout) – 1:46
26. "My Son Cool" – 1:41
27. "Always Crush Me" – 1:44
28. "Alright" – 2:56

== Personnel ==
Guided by Voices

- Robert Pollard – vocals, guitars, drums; percussion (track 17); keys (track 10)
- Tobin Sprout – vocals (tracks 9, 23, 25); guitars, bass guitar, drums, percussion; piano (tracks 8, 27)
- Jim Pollard – bass guitar
- Mitch Mitchell – guitars, bass guitar
- Kevin Fennell – drums, percussion
- Jim Greer – bass guitar; backing vocals (track 5)
- Greg Demos – bass guitar; guitars (tracks 4, 12); violin (track 22)

=== Additional personnel ===
- Pete Jamison – backing vocals

=== Technical ===
- Bob Ludwig – mastering
- Mark Ohe – cover artwork
- Stephen Apicella-Hitchcock – photography
- Tobin Sprout – engineering

== Cover versions ==
Tracks from the album have been covered by various artists since its release. These include:

- "Game of Pricks", covered by American pop-punk bands Magnapop from the German version of their album Mouthfeel and A Sunny Day In Glasgow on their The Sunniest Day Ever EP. Jimmy Eat World released a version on the deluxe edition of Bleed American. Chinese Telephones recorded the song for a 7" single and it was later included on their Democracy compilation. "Game of Pricks" was also covered by the English post-grunge band My Vitriol. Musician Owen Pallett recorded "Game of Pricks" in June 2010 for The A.V. Club's A.V. Undercover web series. Brooklyn band Shark? covered the same song as a B-Side on their 2014 single "Big Summer(Summer Ale)."
- "My Valuable Hunting Knife" was covered by Motion City Soundtrack. The song was also covered by Planningtorock as a bonus track on their album W.
- Opener "A Salty Salute" was covered by both industrial artist Kompressor and New York City band The Strokes.
- Four songs from Alien Lanes appeared on the cover album Sing For Your Meat: A Tribute to Guided By Voices: "A Salty Salute", covered by Superdrag, "My Valuable Hunting Knife", covered by Western Civ, "Game of Pricks", covered by Lou Barlow, and "Watch Me Jumpstart", covered by La Sera.
- Four of the tracks were covered by experimental band Wreck and Reference and released as a short album titled "Alien Pains", published by the Flenser.
- Touché Amoré released Covers Vol. 1 on October 13, 2021 which includes their performance of "Game of Pricks" featuring Barry Johnson of Joyce Manor.
