= Isolation Drills =

Studio album by Guided by Voices
- Released: April 10, 2001
- Recorded: 2000
- Length: 47:12
- Label: TVT
- Producer: Rob Schnapf

Guided by Voices chronology
Do the Collapse (1999)	Isolation Drills (2001)	Universal Truths and Cycles (2002)

Singles from Isolation Drills
- 1. "Chasing Heather Crazy" Released: March 13, 2001; 2. "Glad Girls" Released: July 9, 2001

Professional ratings
Aggregate scores
Source	Rating
Metacritic	83/100
Review scores
Source	Rating
AllMusic	4/5 stars
The Boston Phoenix	3/4 stars
Los Angeles Times	3/4 stars
Pitchfork	7.0/10
Rolling Stone	4/5 stars
Spin	7/10

Isolation Drills is the 12th studio album by American indie rock band Guided by Voices. It was their second and final LP released under TVT Records and their second to feature a major rock producer in Rob Schnapf. The album was also their first to chart on the Billboard 200, peaking at number 168. The album notably features instrumental contributions from Elliott Smith and David Sulzer. Previous longtime band member Tobin Sprout also returned as a guest and contributed with playing piano. While Jim MacPherson plays drums on the album, his replacement Jon McCann is featured in the cover photos, as MacPherson had left the band immediately after the recording to focus on his home life.

== Reception ==
Isolation Drills is currently the highest rating album on the aggregate review website Metacritic of their submitted studio albums.

=== Accolades ===
"Glad Girls" was nominated for the High Times "Pot Song of the Year" award. "Chasing Heather Crazy" was named the 319th best song of the decade by Pitchfork. In 2014, the album was ranked number 92 on PopMatters' list of the Best Albums of the '00s.

== Track listing ==
All tracks are written by Robert Pollard.

No.	Title	Length
1.	"Fair Touching"	3:07
2.	"Skills Like This"	2:47
3.	"Chasing Heather Crazy"	2:53
4.	"Frostman"	0:55
5.	"Twilight Campfighter"	3:07
6.	"Sister I Need Wine"	1:40
7.	"Want One?"	1:48
8.	"The Enemy"	4:53
9.	"Unspirited"	2:25
10.	"Glad Girls"	3:49
11.	"Run Wild"	3:48
12.	"Pivotal Film"	3:10
13.	"How's My Drinking?"	2:38
14.	"The Brides Have Hit Glass"	2:51
15.	"Fine to See You"	3:16
16.	"Privately"	4:05
Total length:		43:24

== Title ==
The opening of "The Enemy" is an excerpt of "Broadcastor House", a track from the 1994 Clown Prince of the Menthol Trailer EP, which may come from the fact that "Broadcastor House" was the initial working title of the album.

== Personnel ==
=== Guided by Voices ===
- Robert Pollard – lead vocals, guitar
- Doug Gillard – lead guitar
- Nate Farley – rhythm guitar
- Tim Tobias – bass
- Jim Macpherson – drums

=== Additional musicians ===
- David Soldier – string arrangements, violin
- Tobin Sprout – piano
- Elliott Smith – piano
- Marlene Rice – violin

=== Technical ===
- Rob Schnapf – mixing, producer
- Doug Boehm – engineer, mixing
- Julian Joyce – mixing
- John Shough – engineer
- Greg Di Gesu – assistant engineer
- Don Tyler – mastering
