= Universal Truths and Cycles =

Studio album by Guided by Voices
- Released: June 18, 2002
- Recorded: 2001
- Genre: Indie rock
- Length: 46:25
- Label: Matador
- Producer: Todd Tobias; Guided by Voices

Guided by Voices chronology
Isolation Drills (2001)	Universal Truths and Cycles (2002)	Earthquake Glue (2003)

Singles from Universal Truths and Cycles
- 1. "Back to the Lake" Released: May 21st, 2002; 2. "Cheyenne" Released: May 21st, 2002; 3. "Everywhere with Helicopter" Released: May 21st, 2002; 4. "Universal Truths and Cycles" Released: May 21st, 2002

Professional ratings
Review scores
Source	Rating
Allmusic	2.5/5 stars
Dusted Magazine	4/5 stars
Pitchfork Media	7.6/10
Popmatters	favorable
Rolling Stone	3/5 stars
The A.V. Club	favorable

Universal Truths and Cycles is the 13th studio album by American indie rock band Guided by Voices. After releasing their previous two albums on TVT Records, Guided by Voices returned to Matador Records.

This was the highest charting Guided by Voices album at the time of release. It peaked at #160 on the Billboard Top 200, #10 on the Independent Albums list, and in the best chart performance of their career, #3 on the Top Heatseekers chart.

Four singles were released from the album: "Cheyenne," "Back to the Lake," "Everywhere with Helicopter," and "Universal Truths and Cycles." B-sides from these singles were collected in the EP The Pipe Dreams of Instant Prince Whippet.

== Track listing ==
All songs written by Robert Pollard.

=== Side A ===
1. "Wire Greyhounds" – 0:35
2. "Skin Parade" – 2:57
3. "Zap" – 1:14
4. "Christian Animation Torch Carriers" – 3:54
5. "Cheyenne" – 2:58
6. "The Weeping Bogeyman" – 1:35
7. "Back to the Lake" – 2:33
8. "Love 1" – 0:54
9. "Storm Vibrations" – 4:59
10. "Factory of Raw Essentials" – 1:25

=== Side B ===
11. "Everywhere with Helicopter" – 2:36
12. "Pretty Bombs" – 3:06
13. "Eureka Signs" – 3:06
14. "Wings of Thorn" – 2:10
15. "Car Language" – 4:44
16. "From a Voice Plantation" – 2:06
17. "The Ids Are Alright" – 1:10
18. "Universal Truths and Cycles" – 2:19
19. "Father Sgt. Christmas Card" – 2:04

== In the media ==
- In the television series The IT Crowd episode Red Door, Roy hides stolen computer equipment under a Universal Truths and Cycles T-shirt. There is a poster of the same on a wall in Roy and Maurice's office.
- In the television series The Wire Nick Sobotka has a Universal Truths and Cycles poster on his wall.
- Guided by Voices performed "Everywhere With Helicopter" live on The Late Late Show with Craig Kilborn on June 17, 2002.

== Personnel ==
Most of the credits do not give specific instruments played by each individual, but rather list performers who appeared on the release in any capacity.

=== Guided by Voices ===
- Robert Pollard
- Doug Gillard
- Tim Tobias
- Nate Farley

=== Additional musicians ===
- Scott Bennett – cello
- John McCann – drums
- Chris Slusarenko – piano (track 7)
- Chris George – cello
- Steve Berson – cello
- Suellen Ogier – effects
- Asha Mevlana – viola, strings
- Helen Yee – violin

=== Technical ===
- Todd Tobias – production
- Scott Bennett – assistant engineer
