= Calling Zero =

Studio album by Go Back Snowball
- Released: February 26, 2002
- Genre: Indie rock
- Label: Rockathon

Calling Zero ratings
Review scores
Source	Rating
AllMusic	4.5/5 stars
Pitchfork	4.3/10
Stylus Magazine	D−

Calling Zero is an album by Go Back Snowball, a side project of Robert Pollard with Mac McCaughan, released on February 26, 2002 by Rockathon.

== Track listing ==
All songs written by Robert Pollard and Mac McCaughan. Side A

1. "Radical Girl"
2. "Calling Zero"
3. "Never Forget Where You Get Them"
4. "Red Hot Halos"
5. "Again the Waterloo"
6. "Climb"

Side B

1. "Go Gold"
2. "Lifetime for the Mavericks"
3. "Throat of Throats"
4. "Ironrose Worm"
5. "It Is Divine"
6. "Dumbluck Systems Stormfront"

== Personnel ==
- Robert Pollard – vocals
- Mac McCaughan – drums, guitar, keyboards
