= Blues and Boogie Shoes =

Studio album by Keene Brothers
- Released: 2006
- Genre: Alternative rock, indie, lo-fi
- Label: Fading Captain

Professional ratings
Review scores
Source	Rating
AllMusic	4/5 stars
The Kansas City Star	3.5/4 stars
Pitchfork	6.3/10
Stylus Magazine	B−

Blues and Boogie Shoes is an album by the Keene Brothers, a band formed by Robert Pollard and Tommy Keene. It was released in 2006.

== Production ==
Robert Pollard wrote the lyrics to the album's songs, while Keene was responsible for the instrumentation.

== Critical reception ==
The Denver Post wrote that "the production is tight and bright, showing Keene’s mastery of power pop and thick, creamy guitar riffs." The Washington Post deemed the album "typically opaque Pollardian lyrics set atop typically power pop-ish Keene melodies." The Toronto Star praised "Death of the Party", writing that "guitars ring, vocals soar and discerning listeners—especially fans of early REM—should rejoice."

AllMusic thought that "Blues and Boogie Shoes is the best kind of collaboration, one that shows both artists at their advantage."

== Track listing ==
All songs written by Tommy Keene & Robert Pollard.

Side A

1. "Evil Vs. Evil"
2. "Death of the Party"
3. "Beauty of the Draft"
4. "Where Others Fail"
5. "Island of Lost Lucies"
6. "Lost Upon Us"

Side B

1. "Heaven's Gate"
2. "The Naked Wall"
3. "The Camouflaged Friend"
4. "Must Engage"
5. "This Time Do You Feel It?"
6. "Blue Shadow"

== Personnel ==
- Robert Pollard – lead vocals
- Tommy Keene – guitar, keyboards
- R. Walt Vincent – backing vocals
- Tommy Keene – backing vocals
- John Richardson – drums on tracks: A4, B2, B4–B6
- Jon Wurster – drums on tracks: A1, A3, B1
