= Do the Collapse =

Studio album by Guided by Voices
- Released: August 3, 1999
- Recorded: 1999
- Genres: Pop rock; Indie rock
- Length: 43:45
- Labels: TVT/Orchard (US); Creation (UK); East West (Germany)
- Producer: Ric Ocasek

Guided by Voices chronology
Mag Earwhig (1997)	Do the Collapse (1999)	Isolation Drills (2001)

Singles from Do the Collapse
- 1. "Surgical Focus" Released: June 22, 1999; 2. "Teenage FBI" Released: September 28, 1999; 3. "Hold on Hope" Released: November 1, 1999

Do the Collapse is the 11th album by Dayton, Ohio indie rock group Guided by Voices. In contrast with their lo-fi reputation, the album features glossy production work from Ric Ocasek, which drew a mixed reception from critics and fans. "Hold On Hope" was covered by country singer Glen Campbell on his 61st album Ghost on the Canvas in 2011. In his introduction to James Greer's book Guided by Voices: A Brief History: Twenty-One Years of Hunting Accidents in the Forests of Rock and Roll, Academy Award-winning film maker Steven Soderbergh referenced the album stating "that album Ric Ocasek produced was terrific."

== Critical reception ==
Professional ratings
Review scores
Source	Rating
AllMusic	2/5 stars
Alternative Press	4/5
Entertainment Weekly	B
The Guardian	4/5 stars
NME	7/10
Pitchfork	4.7/10
Q	4/5 stars
Rolling Stone	3/5 stars
Select	4/5
Spin	6/10

AllMusic's Stephen Thomas Erlewine criticized the album for having similar compositions to past releases, despite major production differences, and considered the band to be lost musically speaking. He also believed the production didn't work with the tracks and resulted in the band creating an "overblown" sound which contrasted negatively with their indie aesthetics. Conversely, in a warmer review for NME, the album was praised as a “timeless, seamless, psychedelic folk-rock soul-quaver perfection to fall in love with life to”.

=== Accolades ===
The track "Teenage FBI" was named the 160th on the "500 Greatest Modern Rock Song of All Time" by 97X in 2006.

== Track listing ==
1. "Teenage FBI" – 2:53
2. "Zoo Pie" – 2:18
3. "Things I Will Keep" – 2:25
4. "Hold on Hope" – 3:31
5. "In Stitches" – 3:39
6. "Dragons Awake!" – 2:08
7. "Surgical Focus" – 3:48
8. "Optical Hopscotch" – 3:01
9. "Mushroom Art" – 1:47
10. "Much Better Mr. Buckles" – 2:24
11. "Wormhole" – 2:33
12. "Strumpet Eye" – 1:58
13. "Liquid Indian" – 3:38
14. "Wrecking Now" – 2:33
15. "Picture Me Big Time" – 4:01
16. "An Unmarketed Product" – 1:08

== Personnel ==
=== Guided by Voices ===
- Robert Pollard – lead vocals, guitar
- Doug Gillard – guitar, keyboard, backing vocals
- Greg Demos – bass guitar
- Jim Macpherson – drums

=== Additional musicians ===
- Ariane Lallemand – cello
- Dylan Williams – viola
- David Soldier – string arrangements, violin
- Ric Ocasek – keyboards
- Brian Sperber – keyboards

=== Technical ===
- Ric Ocasek – production, mixing, engineering
- Brian Sperber – engineer, mixing
- George Marino – mastering
