= Normal Happiness =

Studio album by Robert Pollard
- Released: October 10, 2006
- Genre: Rock, indie rock, pop
- Label: Merge
- Producer: Todd Tobias

Robert Pollard chronology
From a Compound Eye (2005)	Normal Happiness (2006)	Silverfish Trivia (2007)

Professional ratings
Aggregate scores
Source	Rating
Metacritic	72/100
Review scores
Source	Rating
AllMusic	4/5 stars
The Guardian	3/5 stars
Transform Online	not rated
Modern Music	7/10 stars
Mojo	4/5 stars
Rolling Stone	3/5 stars
Pitchfork	(6.4/10

Normal Happiness is the sixth album by Robert Pollard. Like its predecessor, it was recorded with Pollard on basic guitar and vocal tracks, with instrumental overdubs from producer Todd Tobias. Normal Happiness debuted at No. 46 on the Billboard Top Independent Albums chart.

Pollard explained the writing process and the title of Normal Happiness in a Gothamist interview:

"I wrote a total of 47 songs and it just so happened that my favorite ones happened to be the poppier ones and that tone or attitude carried over into the recording process itself. I didn't feel the final product was overly "sappy" so I decided to call it "Normal Happiness". Not too heavy and not light. "

Working titles for the album were You Were Saying? and Gasoline Ragtime.

The album received a 72/100 rating at Metacritic

== Track listing ==
1. "The Accidental Texas Who"
2. "Whispering Whip"
3. "Supernatural Car Lover"
4. "Boxing About"
5. "Serious Bird Woman (You Turn Me On)"
6. "Get a Faceful"
7. "Towers and Landslides"
8. "I Feel Gone Again"
9. "Gasoline Ragtime"
10. "Rhoda Rhoda"
11. "Give Up the Grape"
12. "Pegasus Glue Factory"
13. "Top of My Game"
14. "Tomorrow Will Not Be Another Day"
15. "Join the Eagles"
16. "Full Sun (Dig the Slowness)"
