= Robert Pollard =

American singer and songwriter

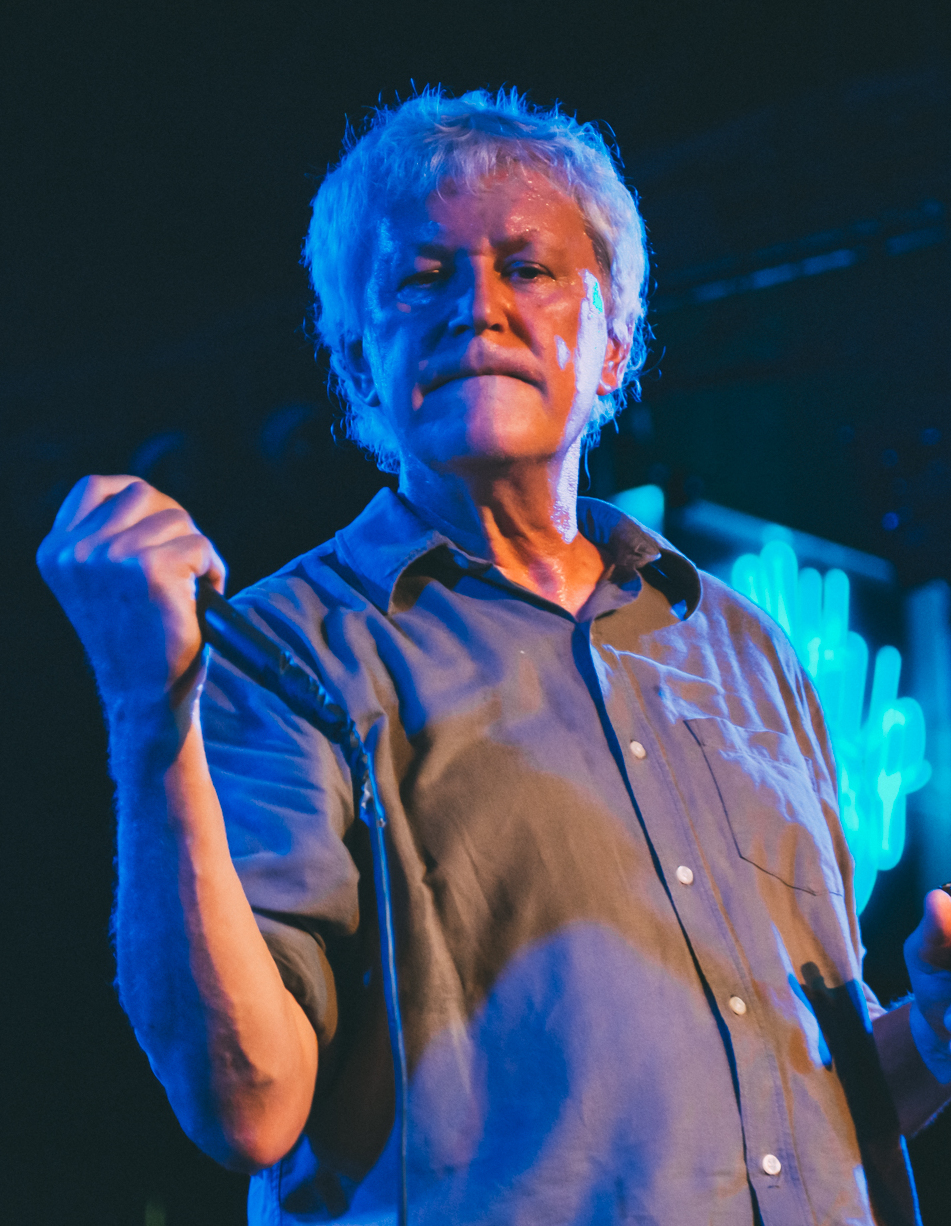
- Pollard in 2014

Background information
- Born: Robert Ellsworth Pollard Jr. October 31, 1957 (age 69); Dayton, Ohio, U.S.
- Genres: Indie rock, pop
- Occupations: Singer, musician, songwriter
- Instruments: Vocals, guitar
- Years active: 1975–present
- Labels: Matador, Merge, Fading Captain Series/Luna

Robert Ellsworth Pollard Jr. (born October 31, 1957) is an American singer and songwriter. He is the frontman and leader of indie rock band Guided by Voices, of which he is also the only constant member. He has also released 22 solo albums.

He has nearly 3,000 songs registered to his name with BMI. In 2006, Paste magazine listed him as the 78th-greatest living songwriter. In 2007, he was nominated for the Shortlist Music Prize.

== Early life and education ==
Pollard was born in Dayton, Ohio, where he has lived all his life. During most of his childhood and adolescence, sports were his main interest. When Pollard began to show interest in music during high school, his father tried to discourage this. Pollard attended Northridge High School in the Dayton suburb of Northridge, followed by Wright State University in Fairborn, Ohio, where he once pitched a no-hitter for the baseball team.

As a teenager Pollard was in a heavy metal cover band called Anacrusis, and went to arena shows which he likens to those featured in the documentary Heavy Metal Parking Lot. Pollard has said that much of the inspiration for his songwriting has come from time spent hanging out with his high school friends from Dayton, a group he calls "The Monument Club". Pollard said of his teenage years:

Growing up, I didn't really have any musical talent. I could always sing, but that's it. So I started hanging around with all these weirdoes from Northridge who could play guitar. And I would just watch them, 'Wow, I've got to learn how to do that.' That song 'Hank's Little Fingers' (on Devil Between My Toes) – Hank (Davidson) is the guy that inspired me to play the guitar. He had a deformed hand with these little bitty fingers.

After graduating from high school in 1975, Pollard bought a guitar with his graduation money. In college, he began singing in rock bands. Although throwing a no-hitter in college, he eventually abandoned athletics realizing that he wasn't quick enough to be a professional and that his character was too independent to be obedient to the strict athletic program. "I was sick of people snapping their fingers and expecting me to move." When he heard the news, Pollard's father withdrew his financial support, forcing his son to get a job washing dishes. Towards the end of his senior year at Wright State University, Pollard married Kim Dowler, a home-town girl he had been dating for seven years. Dowler did not go to college herself, but started working right out of high school.

After Pollard's college graduation, Dowler supported him for a little while, but he then got a job as a school teacher. It was a job with a lot of vacation time and this meant Pollard was able to pursue his music. But the job rubbed off on him, and Pollard has stated that his years as a teacher inspired songs such as "Gold Star For Robot Boy", "Teenage FBI" and "Non-Absorbing". Pollard has worked at all levels of primary school, from elementary school to middle school to high school. He found the most difficult assignment to be teaching physical science to junior high schoolers. Eventually he settled on teaching fourth graders.

He said of his teaching years: "I never went to the teachers' lounge. But the teachers liked me. In elementary school, there aren't a lot of male teachers, so they liked the fact I was around. They'd say, 'Why don't you come down and hang out with us in the teachers' lounge?' But I would go off and take a nap to try to get rid of my hangover. I had 14 years of that."

== Career ==
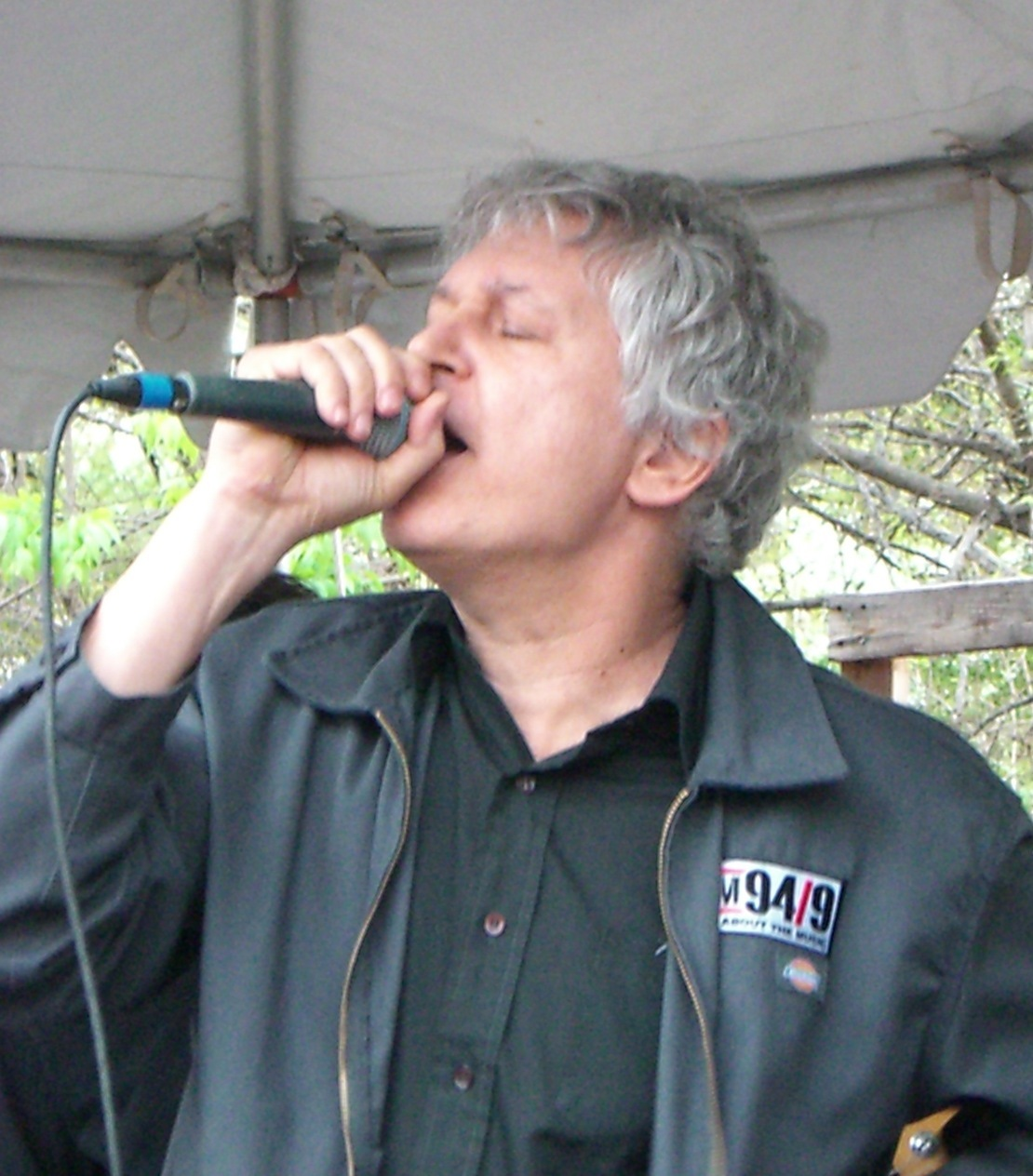
Pollard performing at SXSW 2006

=== Beginnings ===
Pollard started playing music in local cover bands in Dayton, and got involved in a songwriters' guild, but he longed to be the leader of a band. In 1981, he began playing original songs with fellow Northridge High School alums Kevin Fennell and Mitch Mitchell. For two years they recorded in the basement of Pollard's house, and played out under a variety of names (including Instant Lovelies, Acid Ranch and Coyote Call). Then in 1983 Pollard eventually dubbed the project "Guided by Voices". At the time he was working part-time as an elementary school teacher.

In total, Guided by Voices released 16 full-length original albums between 1987 and 2004, as well as a large number of EPs and compilations. Although known as a lo-fi band that relied on home recordings, in later years the group relied more on professional recording studios and worked with producers such as Ric Ocasek.

Initially, Guided by Voices was a band in name only, its members being a revolving cast of musicians, most of whom Pollard kicked out of the band at one time or another. "In the early days of Guided by Voices, when no one was listening, I was impatient", Pollard wrote in 2005. "I used to tire of people in the band very quickly. I had physical altercations with them. I even resorted to bullshit tactics, like telling the band I was quitting and we were breaking up, then forming again a month later with new members."

To finance the band's early recordings, Pollard, his brother, and their manager obtained a loan from the Dayton Public Schools credit union. Between 1986 and 1992, they released six records in this way, recording, pressing and distributing them at their own expense. These records got very little response, and although the pressings ran only to between 300 and 1,000 copies of each, the producers were left with many copies on their hands. In 1992, bowing to the lack of support from family and friends, and to the pressure of unpaid debt, Pollard broke up Guided by Voices after releasing Propeller, which he felt was their best album to date. He then committed to teaching school full-time.

However, Propeller impressed the indie label Scat Records, who signed the band to a recording contract. The result was that Guided by Voices got back together in 1993, and played a show that year at the New Music Seminar in New York City – the band's first live date in almost six years. With the release of Vampire on Titus (1993), the band was finally able to perform live around the United States.

In August 2004, the band released Half Smiles of the Decomposed, which was intended to be their final album. In 2004, on New Year's Eve, Guided by Voices performed their last show at The Metro in Chicago. In 2010 the main 1990s line-up reunited for Matador Records' 21st birthday. A full tour followed and the band remained together until September 2014.

Guided by Voices released its first album in seven years on January 1, 2012, Let's Go Eat the Factory. On January 3, the band appeared on the Late Show with David Letterman to promote the LP. They released their second post-reunion album, Class Clown Spots a UFO, on June 11. A third album, The Bears for Lunch, came out on November 13. The fourth post-reunion album (and twentieth Guided by Voices album), English Little League, was released on April 30, 2013. Motivational Jumpsuit and Cool Planet followed in February and May 2014, respectively. In September 2014, the band announced they were disbanding once again and cancelled all remaining dates on their tour.

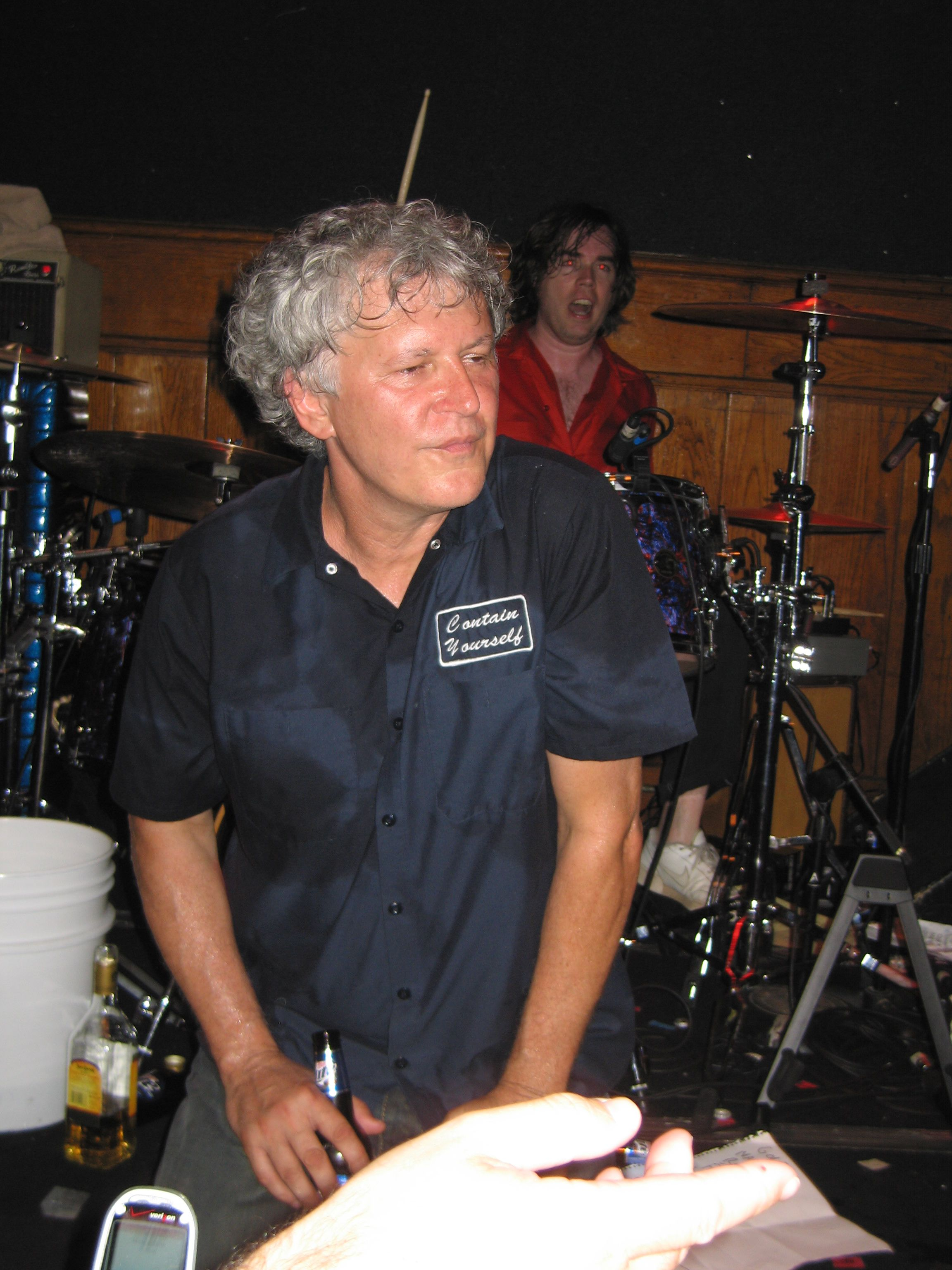
Pollard performing in Chicago in 2006

=== Solo career ===
Pollard began releasing solo records in 1996, alongside regular releases from Guided by Voices. These albums were typically recorded with a small group consisting of current or former Guided by Voices members, and they were generally considered to informally be part of the Guided by Voices canon, as that band would regularly perform selections from the solo releases in concert.

After the dissolution of Guided by Voices in 2004, Robert Pollard launched his official solo career with the release of From a Compound Eye in February 2006. Pollard's recent studio work has eschewed the live-band format, instead relying on the multi-instrumental talents of Todd Tobias, who produced several Guided by Voices albums. In 2006, Pollard resumed touring with a new band informally dubbed "The Ascended Masters", which featured Tommy Keene on lead guitar and keyboards, Dave Phillips on guitar, Jon Wurster on drums, and Jason Narducy on bass, but subsequent to the cancellation of some 2006 dates due to a leg injury, Pollard announced his retirement from touring. Despite this, Pollard performed two shows in support of his new albums. The first show was on November 30, 2007, in Chicago at The Metro. The second was on December 1, 2007, in Newport, Kentucky (across the Ohio River from Cincinnati) at the Southgate House. After releasing Superman Was a Rocker in January, he announced that he would be leaving Merge Records to form Guided by Voices, Inc., his own record label that will produce his entire musical library.

=== Other bands and projects ===
Pollard has also issued recordings under a variety of other band names and in collaboration with former GBV colleagues and other musicians. In 2008, he formed a new band, Boston Spaceships, comprising Pollard, John Moen of The Decemberists and Perhapst, and Chris Slusarenko, who played in the final incarnation of Guided by Voices. The band's first album, Brown Submarine, was released on September 16, 2008, on Guided by Voices, Inc., and was followed by a tour in the fall of that year. A follow-up, The Planets Are Blasted, was released on February 17, 2009, with another album Zero to 99 released in October 2009. Our Cubehouse Still Rocks was released in September 2010. Boston Spaceships released their fifth and final album Let It Beard on August 2, 2011.

== Discography ==
Guided By Voices:

- 1987 – Devil Between My Toes (LP)
- 1987 - Sandbox (LP)
- 1989 - Self-Inflicted Aerial Nostalgia (LP)
- 1990 - Same Place the Fly Got Smashed (LP)
- 1992 - Propeller (CD/LP/TAPE)
- 1994 - Vampire on Titus (CD/LP/TAPE)
- 1994 - Bee Thousand (CD/LP/TAPE)
- 1995 - Alien Lanes (CD/LP/TAPE)
- 1996 - Tonics & Twisted Chasers (CD/LP)
- 1996 - Under the Bushes Under the Stars (CD/LP/TAPE)
- 1997 - Mag Earwhig! (CD/LP/TAPE)
- 1999 - Do the Collapse (CD/LP/TAPE)
- 2001 - Isolation Drills (CD/LP)
- 2002 - Universal Truths and Cycles (CD/LP)
- 2003 - Earthquake Glue (CD/LP)
- 2004 - Half Smiles of the Decomposed (CD/LP)
- 2012 - Let's Go Eat the Factory (CD/LP)
- 2012 - Class Clown Spots a UFO (CD/LP)
- 2012 - The Bears for Lunch (CD/LP)
- 2013 - English Little League (CD/LP)
- 2014 - Motivational Jumpsuit (CD/LP)
- 2014 - Cool Planet (CD/LP)
- 2016 - Please Be Honest (CD/LP)
- 2017 - August by Cake (CD/LP)
- 2017 - How Do You Spell Heaven (CD/LP)
- 2018 - Space Gun (CD/LP)
- 2019 - Zeppelin Over China (CD/2xLP)
- 2019 - Warp and Woof (CD/LP)
- 2019 - Sweating the Plague (CD/LP)
- 2020 - Surrender Your Poppy Field (CD/LP)
- 2020 - Mirrored Aztec (CD/LP)
- 2020 - Styles We Paid For (CD/LP)
- 2021 - Earth Man Blues (CD/LP)
- 2021 - It's Not Them. It Couldn't Be Them. It Is Them! (CD/LP)
- 2022 - Crystal Nuns Cathedral (CD/LP)
- 2022 - Tremblers and Goggles by Rank (CD/LP)
- 2023 - La La Land (CD/LP)
- 2023 - Welshpool Frillies (CD/LP)
- 2023 - Nowhere to Go but Up (CD/LP)
- 2024 - Strut of Kings (CD/LP)
- 2025 - Universe Room (CD/LP)
- 2025 - Thick Rich and Delicious (CD/LP)
- 2026 - Crawlspace of the Pantheon (CD/LP)

Solo studio albums:

- 1996 – Not in My Airforce (CD/LP)
- 1998 – Waved Out (CD/LP)
- 1999 – Kid Marine (CD/LP)
- 2003 – Motel of Fools (CD/LP)
- 2004 – Fiction Man (CD/LP)
- 2006 – From a Compound Eye (CD/2×LP)
- 2006 – Normal Happiness (CD/LP)
- 2007 – Standard Gargoyle Decisions (CD/LP)
- 2007 – Coast to Coast Carpet of Love (CD/LP)
- 2008 – Superman Was a Rocker (CD/LP)
- 2008 – Robert Pollard Is Off to Business (CD/LP)
- 2009 – The Crawling Distance (CD/LP)
- 2009 – Elephant Jokes (CD/LP)
- 2010 – We All Got Out of the Army (CD/LP)
- 2010 – Moses on a Snail (CD/LP)
- 2011 – Space City Kicks (CD/LP)
- 2011 – Lord of the Birdcage (CD/LP)
- 2012 – Mouseman Cloud (CD/LP)
- 2012 – Jack Sells The Cow (CD/LP)
- 2013 – Honey Locust Honky Tonk (CD/LP)
- 2013 – Blazing Gentlemen (CD/LP)
- 2015 – Faulty Superheroes (CD/LP)
- 2016 – Of Course You Are (CD/LP)
- 2022 – Our Gaze (CD/LP)

Other albums/EPs:

- 1999 – Speak Kindly of Your Volunteer Fire Department (with Doug Gillard) (CD/LP)
- 2001 – Choreographed Man of War (titled as: "Robert Pollard and the Soft Rock Renegades") (CD/LP)
- 2002 – The Tropic of Nipples (Complete soundtrack of the Tropic of Nipples)The Tropic of Nipples
- 2004 – Edison's Demos original demos for the songs that became Earthquake Glue (CD/LP)
- 2005 – Music for 'Bubble' (CD EP/7")
- 2005 – Zoom (It Happens All Over the World) (CD EP/7")
- 2005 – Relaxation of the Asshole (spoken word) (LP)
- 2006 – Moon (live CD included with original mail orders of Normal Happiness)
- 2007 – Meet the King: Asshole 2 (LP – Yuk Yuk Motherfucker – Unofficial release)
- 2007 – Silverfish Trivia (CD/12" EP)
- 2008 – Weatherman and Skin Goddess (CD EP/12")

== Other projects ==
Lexo and the Leapers: (Robert Pollard backed by The Tasties)

- 1999 – Ask Them (12-inch EP/CD)

Nightwalker (pseudonym for archival GbV recordings)

- 1999 – In Shop We Build Electric Chairs: Professional Music by Nightwalker 1984–1993

Hazzard Hotrods: (Recording of informal 1990 performance by Pollard, Tobin Sprout, Mitch Mitchell, and Kevin Fennell)

- 2000 – Big Trouble (re-released as Bigger Trouble 2005)

Howling Wolf Orchestra: (Pollard and various GbV members)

- 2000 – Speedtraps for the Bee Kingdom (12-inch EP/CD)

Airport 5: (Robert Pollard and Tobin Sprout)

- 2001 – Tower in the Fountain of Sparks
- 2002 – Life Starts Here

Circus Devils: (Robert Pollard, Todd Tobias and Tim Tobias)

- 2001 – Ringworm Interiors (CD/LP)
- 2002 – The Harold Pig Memorial (CD/LP)
- 2003 – Pinball Mars (CD/LP)
- 2005 – Five (CD/LP)
- 2007 – Sgt. Disco (CD/2XLP)
- 2008 – Ataxia (CD/LP)
- 2009 – Gringo (CD/LP)
- 2010 – Mother Skinny (CD/LP)
- 2011 – Capsized! (CD/LP)
- 2013 – When Machines Attack (CD/LP)
- 2013 – My Mind Has Seen the White Trick (CD/LP)
- 2014 – Escape (CD/LP)
- 2015 – Stomping Grounds (CD/LP)
- 2017 – Laughs Last (CD/LP)
- 2017 – Laughs Best (The Kids Eat It Up) (CD/LP) [anthology]
- 2023 - Squeeze the Needle (LP)

Go Back Snowball: (Robert Pollard and Mac McCaughan)

- 2002 – Calling Zero

Acid Ranch: (archival recordings featuring Robert Pollard, Kevin Fennell and Mitch Mitchell)

- 2002 – Some of the Magic Syrup Was Preserved (2×LP—Pollard's first double album)
- 2005 – As Forever: A Manifesto of Fractured Imagination And Wreckless Living
- 2007 – The Great Houdini Wasn't So Great

Phantom Tollbooth:

- 2003 – Beard of Lightning

Lifeguards (Robert Pollard and Doug Gillard)

- 2003 – Mist King Urth
- 2011 – Waving at the Astronauts

The Moping Swans (Robert Pollard, Greg Demos, Jim MacPherson and Tony Conley)

- 2005 – Lightninghead to Coffee Pot (12-inch EP/CD)

Keene Brothers: (Robert Pollard and Tommy Keene)

- 2006 – Blues and Boogie Shoes

The Takeovers: (Robert Pollard and Chris Slusarenko)

- 2006 – Turn to Red
- 2007 – Bad Football

Psycho and the Birds: (Todd Tobias supplementing Pollard solo demos)

- 2006 – All That is Holy
- 2006 – Check Your Zoo (7-inch EP/CD)
- 2008 – We've Moved

Boston Spaceships: (Robert Pollard, Chris Slusarenko, John Moen)

- 2008 – Brown Submarine
- 2009 – The Planets Are Blasted
- 2009 – Zero To 99
- 2009 – Licking Stamps And Drinking Shitty Coffee: Live In Atlanta
- 2010 – Our Cubehouse Still Rocks
- 2011 – Let It Beard

Carbon Whales:

- 2008 – South (CD EP)

Cosmos: (Robert Pollard and Richard Davies)

- 2009 – Jar of Jam Ton of Bricks

Mars Classroom: (Robert Pollard and Gary Waleik)

- 2011 – The New Theory of Everything

The Sunflower Logic:

- 2013 – Clouds on the Polar Landscape (CD EP)

Teenage Guitar: (Robert Pollard playing all instruments)

- 2013 – Force Fields At Home
- 2014 – More Lies From The Gooseberry Bush

Ricked Wicky: (Kevin March, Nick Mitchell, Robert Pollard, Todd Tobias)

- 2015 – I Sell The Circus (LP – Guided by Voices Inc. – GBVi52)
- 2015 – Death Metal Kid (7-inch, Single – Guided by Voices Inc. – GBVi53)
- 2015 – Mobility (7-inch, Single – Guided by Voices Inc. – GBVi54)
- 2015 – Piss Face (7-inch, Single – Guided by Voices Inc. – GBVi55)
- 2015 – King Heavy Metal (LP – Guided by Voices Inc. – GBVi60)
- 2015 – Swimmer to a Liquid Armchair (LP – Guided by Voices Inc.)

ESP Ohio: (Robert Pollard, Doug Gillard, Mark Shue and Travis Harrison)

- 2016 – Starting Point of the Royal Cyclopean

Cash Rivers and the Sinners:

- 2017 – She Laughed I Left (7-inch EP)
- 2018 – Blue Balls Lincoln
- 2018 – Do Not Try to Adjust Your Set I am the Horizontal and the Vertical
- 2019 – Loose Shoes
- 2020 – Bad Side of the Coin

Cub Scout Bowling Pins:

- 2021 - Heaven Beats Iowa (CD EP)
- 2025 - Clang Clang Ho

Rip Van Winkle:

- 2024 - The Grand Rapids (CD EP)
- 2025 - Blasphemy

=== Fading Captain series ===
During the mid-90s, in addition to GbV albums appearing annually, Pollard's prolificacy typically was vented onto innumerable singles, EPs, compilations and other side releases. However, once signed to a major label and constrained to the expectation of producing only a single album per 18 months, Pollard began the self-financed and released Fading Captain Series, a series of releases both under his own name, and a wide variety of pseudonyms. In addition to solo and archival releases, Pollard began collaborating with fellow musicians and friends by mail via a process dubbed "postal rock" – Pollard would receive completed musical backing tracks, and add his own lyrics and vocals. Albums under the Airport 5, Circus Devils, and Go Back Snowball monikers, among others were produced in this fashion.

In December 2006, Pollard announced that the Fading Captain Series was being concluded with the release of Crickets: Best of the Fading Captain Series 1999–2007, a 50-song "best of" collection spanning from 1999 through 2007.

The bands that used to release works in the Fading Captain Series now release records on other labels, such as The Takeovers' Bad Football coming out on Off Records and the Circus Devils' Sgt. Disco coming out on Ipecac Records. In addition the Pollard albums Kid Marine, Motel of Fools and Fiction Man were all released in the Fading Captain Series although Pollard's other solo albums were not.

=== Other record labels ===
When Pollard announced that the Fading Captain Series was being concluded he also announced that he was starting up a new record label, then called Record Company Records but later re-titled as Prom is Coming, which is named after a song off his first solo album Not in My Airforce. The first (and thus far only) release on Prom is Coming was Silverfish Trivia.

In spring 2007, Pollard began a singles collection called the Happy Jack Rock Records Single Series in which one 7-inch record was released per month for 12 months starting June 22, 2007. All the records featured an A-side from Pollard's dueling Merge releases that year (Standard Gargoyle Decisions and Coast to Coast Carpet of Love) and a non-album B-side. 1,000 of each 7-inch was pressed.

Pollard's album Superman Was a Rocker was the first LP released on Happy Jack Rock Records (although the vinyl version of Circus Devils' Sgt. Disco had been released on the same label in 2007). Pollard continues to release 7-inch records on the label. June 2009 will see the first release from a new Happy Jack project Cosmos, a collaboration with Richard Davies titled Jar of Jam Ton of Bricks.

In 2008, Pollard announced the forming of yet another new label Guided by Voices Inc. The first album release on Guided by Voices Inc. was Robert Pollard Is Off To Business, preceded by the 12-inch EP Weatherman And Skin Goddess. Pollard's first two Boston Spaceships releases have been on Guided by Voices Inc.

=== EAT and Town of Mirrors ===
In the fall of 2003 Pollard released EAT, a literary magazine consisting of original poems and collages by Pollard. As of 2023 EAT is on its eighteenth issue. Pollard's collage art is featured on many Guided by Voices albums (notable exceptions being the two released on TVT Records).

In 2008, Pollard's collages were collected and published in Town of Mirrors: The Reassembled Imagery of Robert Pollard. Town of Mirrors features Pollard's visual art and lyrics/poetry. There are over 175 collages, 20 of which were created specifically for the book's release.

== Personal life ==
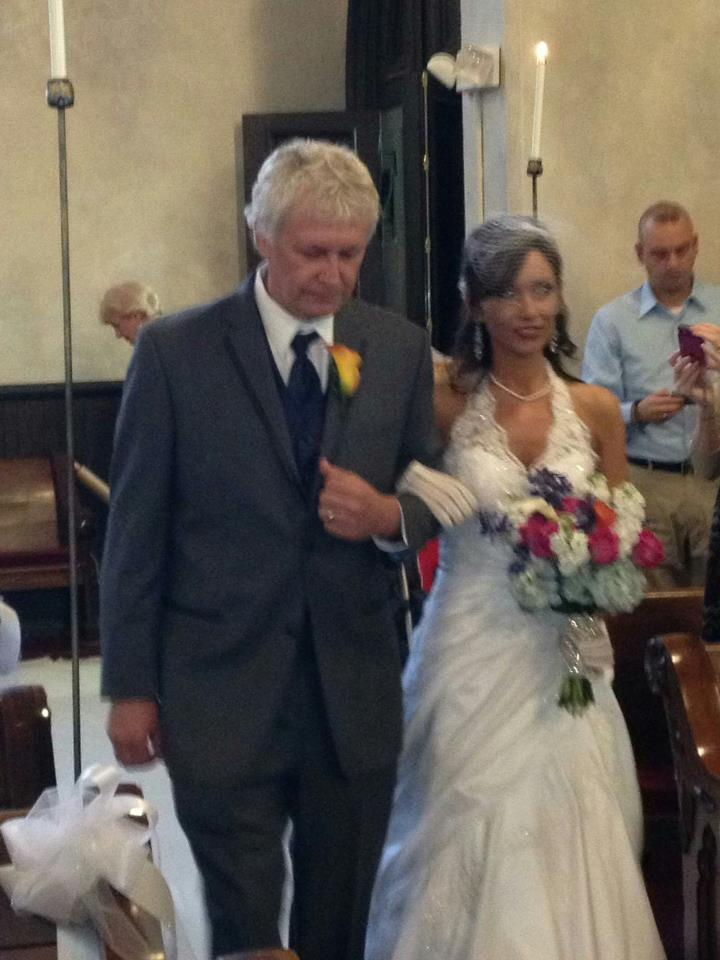
Pollard and his daughter in 2012

Pollard had two children with Kim Dowler. He wrote a song about each: "Your Name Is Wild" about his daughter Erika and "My Son Cool" being about his son Bryan. However, the success of Guided by Voices in the mid 1990s coincided with the breakdown of their marriage. In 2007 Pollard married Sarah Zade. The couple currently lives in Dayton, Ohio.

"I've never considered myself to be a runaway success at anything I've done, including parenthood", Pollard wrote in 2005. "But I've at least allowed my children to pursue their own interests without too much interference, and I think they both turned out pretty good."

== Honors and awards ==
- 2010: Northridge High School, Northridge Athletic Hall of Fame, Class of 2010 – with his brother Jim Pollard

== Works and publications ==
=== Books ===
- Pollard, Robert (words and pictures by); Moody, Rick (introduction by) (2008). Reynolds, Eric (ed.). Town of Mirrors: The Reassembled Imagery of Robert Pollard. Seattle, WA: Fantagraphics Books. ISBN 978-1-56097-924-1. OCLC 181140114.
- Pollard, Robert (2017). 100 (aka Robert Pollard 100). Dayton, OH: Guided By Voices Inc. / Rockathon Records. – includes 100 front and back covers of Pollard's studio albums
- Pollard, Robert (2025). Eat 21. Dayton, OH: Guided By Voices Inc. / Rockathon Records.
- Pollard, Robert (2024). Eat 20. Dayton, OH: Guided By Voices Inc. / Rockathon Records.

=== Articles ===
- Pollard, Robert (May–June 2005). "Life Lessons from Robert Pollard: Wisdom from the man who brought you Guided By Voices". Utne Reader.
