= Bee Thousand =

Studio album by Guided by Voices
- Released: June 21, 1994
- Recorded: 1984–1993
- Studios: Various places in Dayton, Ohio, with recordings pulled from as far back as the early 1980s
- Genres: Indie rock; slacker rock; avant-pop; progressive pop
- Length: 36:35
- Label: Scat

Guided by Voices chronology
Vampire on Titus (1993)	Bee Thousand (1994)	Alien Lanes (1995)

Alternative cover
- Bee Thousand was reissued in 2004 as Bee Thousand: The Director's Cut.

Bee Thousand is the seventh album by American indie rock band Guided by Voices, released on June 21, 1994, on Scat Records. After its release the band became one of the more prominent groups associated with the "lo-fi" or "slacker rock" subgenre, a movement defined in part by the relatively low fidelity of audio releases. Musically, the album draws inspiration from British Invasion-era rock music and punk rock. Following the release of Bee Thousand, the band began to attract interest from other record labels, eventually signing with Matador for their next album.

== Background ==
Guided by Voices is a Dayton, Ohio-based band formed in 1983. Although by 1992 the band had released five full-length albums (not including their 1986 debut EP, Forever Since Breakfast), Guided by Voices was not a band in a conventional sense; its line-up was extremely loose, consisting of whoever of a group of friends showed up to short notice recording sessions. Bandleader and frontman Robert Pollard thought of Guided by Voices as more of a "songwriter's guild" than a band, and also said that "Whoever could come over would play. [...] It was just a bunch of friends who could occasionally get together so it didn't really feel like a band."

Bee Thousand was to be the original band's final album. Pollard was close to disbanding Guided by Voices by 1993, due to financial constraints and pressure to focus more on his family and teaching career; Pollard has also stated that the band was nearly broken up as early as 1991, during the creation of Propeller. Pollard was also struggling with writing for a follow-up record to Vampire on Titus and Propeller, which had been the band's two most noticed records yet. However, it occurred to him to "deconstruct" and "reconstruct" the band's older, unused material into new songs.

== Recording ==
Unlike some of the band's earlier releases, Bee Thousand was not recorded in a studio, but rather on Portastudios or other primitive home recording devices in the garages and basements of various band members. Moreover, many of the demo takes of the songs were used for the album. Due in part to both of these factors, several technical errors are present in the album's recording and mixing; for example, the guitar track drops out at one point in both "Hardcore UFO's" and “Mincer Ray”. The band's choice to use inexpensive recording devices was initially a matter of economics, but eventually the band grew to prefer the sound. Pollard said that:

...For our first [EP], Forever Since Breakfast, we went into a studio and created a very mediocre recording out of a very sterile environment. I thought, "Fuck that. If we're paying for it and no one's listening to these records anyway, if we're only making them for ourselves, then I'm going to put exactly what I want on them."

Kevin Fennell similarly said, "When Bee Thousand came out we sounded much less professional than we did in 1982. The music was much more spontaneous." Pollard also said that, at the time, the band's recording style was intended to sound like Beatles bootlegs. Furthermore, songs were usually completed in a minimum number of takes with no rehearsal beforehand. Recording for the album was extremely brief, taking only three days, with Pollard estimating that each song took roughly half an hour.

== Music ==
The music of Bee Thousand is influenced by British Invasion rock music, as well as what Pollard calls the "four P's" of rock: pop, punk rock, progressive rock, and psychedelic rock. Only a few new songs were written for the album, among them "I Am a Scientist" and "Gold Star for Robot Boy", with the rest of the album mostly being overdubbed, rerecorded, or edited versions of older, unused material.

While typical rock instruments, such as guitar, bass guitar, and drums, are dominant, a variety of instruments and sounds are used. Recorders are used in "The Goldheart Mountaintop Queen Directory", and a piano is used in the closing track "You're Not an Airplane".

=== Lyrics ===
Pollard's surreal lyrical style has been compared to the cut-up technique of Beat Generation writer William S. Burroughs. Many of the album's lyrics reflect childish or fantastical themes and were heavily influenced by the statements and actions of Pollard's fourth grade class, exemplified by "Gold Star for Robot Boy". Pollard was inspired to write "The Goldheart Mountaintop Queen Directory" after having an LSD-triggered psychedelic experience in which he perceived his own face in a mirror changing into his son's; however, the song's lyrics are not about this event. According to Pollard, "I Am a Scientist" was "the first song that showed some maturity in my ability as a songwriter." The lyrics for "Tractor Rape Chain" are taken from three other songs: "Still Worth Nothing", "Tractor Rape Chain (Clean It Up)", and "Tell Me".

== Title and cover art ==
The title Bee Thousand was inspired by a group brainstorming session, during which band members smoked cannabis. Pollard's brother, Jim, thought of "zoo thousand", allegedly inspired by a mile marker reading "Z1000." This phrase coalesced with a misspelling of a movie title at a drive-in theater, with "Beethoven" spelled as "Beethouen", which Pollard liked because the misspelling sounded like the name of the Who guitarist Pete Townshend. Other considered titles included All That Glue and Instructions for the Rusty Time Machine, both of which were used in the lyrics of other Guided by Voices songs.

The caped person on the front of the album is from an image in a National Geographic article documenting Mardi Gras festivities in Acadiana.

== Reception ==
Professional ratings
Review scores
Source	Rating
AllMusic	4.5/5 stars
Chicago Tribune	3.5/4 stars
Entertainment Weekly	B+
Mojo	4/5 stars
NME	7/10
Rolling Stone	4/5 stars
The Rolling Stone Album Guide	4/5 stars
Spin	5/5 stars
Spin Alternative Record Guide	8/10
The Village Voice	B−

Professional ratings
Bee Thousand: The Director's Cut
Review scores
Source	Rating
Pitchfork	8.4/10
Stylus Magazine	A+

In July 2014, Guitar World ranked Bee Thousand at number 6 in their "Superunknown: 50 Iconic Albums That Defined 1994" list.

=== Accolades ===
Accolades for Bee Thousand
Publication	Country	Accolade	Year	Rank
Spin	United States	Best Albums of 1994	1994	10
The Village Voice	United States	Album of the Year – Critics Pick	1994	8
Alternative Press	United States	The 90 Greatest Albums of the '90s	1998	63
Pitchfork	United States	Top 100 Albums of the 1990s	2003	10
Spin	United States	Top 100 Albums of the Last 20 Years	2005	37
Amazon.com	United States	The 100 Greatest Indie Rock Albums of All Time	2009	1
Mojo	United Kingdom	The 100 Greatest Albums of Our Lifetime 1993–2006	2006	80
Rolling Stone	United States	The 100 Best Albums of the Nineties	2010	79
Pitchfork	United States	The 150 Best Albums of the 1990s	2022	123

== Track listing ==
=== Original release ===
All tracks are written by Robert Pollard, except where noted.

Side one
No.	Title	Writer(s)	Length
1.	"Hardcore UFO's"		1:54
2.	"Buzzards and Dreadful Crows"	Jim Pollard; R. Pollard	1:43
3.	"Tractor Rape Chain"		3:04
4.	"The Goldheart Mountaintop Queen Directory"		1:45
5.	"Hot Freaks"	R. Pollard; Tobin Sprout	1:42
6.	"Smothered in Hugs"	Mitch Mitchell; J. Pollard; R. Pollard	2:59
7.	"Yours to Keep"		1:15
8.	"Echos Myron"		2:42

Side two
No.	Title	Writer(s)	Length
1.	"Gold Star for Robot Boy"		1:39
2.	"Awful Bliss"	Sprout	1:12
3.	"Mincer Ray"	Sprout	2:21
4.	"A Big Fan of the Pigpen"	Randy Campbell; J. Pollard; R. Pollard	2:09
5.	"Queen of Cans and Jars"		1:55
6.	"Her Psychology Today"	Guided by Voices	2:04
7.	"Kicker of Elves"		1:04
8.	"Ester's Day"	Sprout	1:51
9.	"Demons Are Real"	Guided by Voices	0:48
10.	"I Am a Scientist"		2:30
11.	"Peep-Hole"		1:25
12.	"You're Not an Airplane"	Sprout	0:33

=== Bee Thousand: The Director's Cut ===
Side one
No.	Title	Writer(s)	Length
1.	"Demons Are Real"	Mitchell; J. Pollard; R. Pollard; Sprout	0:49
2.	"Deathtrot and Warlock Riding a Rooster"	Mitchell; R. Pollard	1:12
3.	"Postal Blowfish"	Mitchell; R. Pollard	2:09
4.	"The Goldheart Mountaintop Queen Directory"		1:45
5.	"At Odds with Dr. Genesis"		1:25
6.	"Hot Freaks"	R. Pollard; Sprout	1:44
7.	"Queen of Cans and Jars"		1:56
8.	"Bite"	Mitchell; J. Pollard; R. Pollard	1:04
9.	"It's Like Soul Man" (4-track version)	Sprout	0:49

Side two
No.	Title	Writer(s)	Length
1.	"Supermarket the Moon"		2:13
2.	"Stabbing a Star"		1:46
3.	"Esther's Day"	Sprout	1:33
4.	"Her Psychology Today"	Mitchell; J. Pollard; R. Pollard; Sprout	2:05
5.	"Good for a Few Laughs"	R. Pollard; Sprout	2:15
6.	"Smothered in Hugs"	Mitchell; J. Pollard; R. Pollard	3:03
7.	"What Are We Coming Up To?"		1:57
8.	"Peep-Hole"		1:30

Side three
No.	Title	Writer(s)	Length
1.	"Revolution Boy"		3:03
2.	"Indian Was an Angel"		2:07
3.	"Zoning the Planet"		2:25
4.	"Scissors"	Sprout	1:48
5.	"Crayola"		1:17
6.	"Kicker of Elves"		1:15
7.	"2nd Moves to Twin"	Mitchell; J. Pollard; R. Pollard	2:46
8.	"I'll Buy You a Bird"		1:47

Side four
No.	Title	Writer(s)	Length
1.	"Awful Bliss"	Sprout	1:13
2.	"Echos Myron"		2:19
3.	"Why Did You Land?" (4-track version)		2:45
4.	"You're Not an Airplane"	Sprout	0:34
5.	"Crunch Pillow"	Sprout	2:46
6.	"Rainbow Billy"		1:39
7.	"Tractor Rape Chain"		2:47
8.	"Crocker's Favorite Song"		2:16

Side five
No.	Title	Writer(s)	Length
1.	"I Am a Scientist"		2:30
2.	"Buzzards and Dreadful Crows"	J. Pollard; R. Pollard	1:43
3.	"A Big Fan of the Pigpen"	Campbell; J. Pollard; R. Pollard	2:09
4.	"Mincer Ray"	Sprout	2:21
5.	"Way to a Man's Heart"	Unknown	1:52
6.	"Twig"	Unknown	2:15
7.	"Gold Star for Robot Boy"		1:39
8.	"Hardcore UFO's"		1:54
9.	"Yours to Keep"		1:15
10.	"Shocker in Gloomtown"		1:05
11.	"Break Even"		1:40

Side six
No.	Title	Writer(s)	Length
1.	"I'll Get Over It"	J. Pollard; R. Pollard; Sprout	0:39
2.	"Shocker in Gloomtown"		1:25
3.	"Alien Lanes"	J. Pollard; R. Pollard; Sprout	2:32
4.	"Off the Floor"	Sprout	0:53
5.	"Break Even"		2:28
6.	"Bee Thousand"		1:30
7.	"I Am a Scientist"		2:31
8.	"Curse of the Black Ass Buffalo"		1:20
9.	"Do the Earth"		2:42
10.	"Planet's Own Brand"		1:15
11.	"My Valuable Hunting Knife"		2:08

== Personnel ==
Guided by Voices

- Robert Pollard – vocals (tracks 1–9, 12–15, 17–19); guitar (tracks 1–4, 6–9, 12, 13, 15, 17–19); other instruments (tracks 4, 9, 15, 19)
- Jim Pollard – bass guitar (track 12); guitar, feedback (track 17)
- Tobin Sprout – vocals (tracks 10, 11, 16, 20); bass guitar (tracks 1, 8, 14); guitar (tracks 1, 5, 10, 11, 16); piano (track 20); other instruments (tracks 5, 10, 11, 16, 20)
- Mitch Mitchell – guitar (tracks 6, 14)
- Don Thrasher – drums, percussion (tracks 9, 18)
- Dan Toohey – bass guitar (tracks 2, 6, 13)
- Kevin Fennell – drums, percussion (tracks 1–3, 6, 8, 13–15, 17)
- Greg Demos – bass guitar (track 3)

Additional musicians

- Randy Campbell – backing vocals (track 12)
