= Earthquake Glue =

Studio album by Guided by Voices
- Released: August 19, 2003
- Recorded: 2003
- Genre: Rock
- Length: 45:17
- Label: Matador
- Producer: Todd Tobias

Guided by Voices chronology
Universal Truths and Cycles (2002)	Earthquake Glue (2003)	Half Smiles of the Decomposed (2004)

Earthquake Glue is the 14th record by Dayton, Ohio rock group Guided by Voices. Working titles for the album included "Model Prisoners of the 5 Sense Realm", "Live Like Kings Forever", and "All Sinners Welcome". The first 25,000 copies were packaged in a numbered limited-edition digipak. Some copies of Earthquake Glue contained a golden ticket; people with a golden ticket were entitled to a free copy of the anthology box set Hardcore UFOs: Revelations, Epiphanies and Fast Food in the Western Hemisphere.

== Reception ==
Professional ratings
Aggregate scores
Source	Rating
Metacritic	78/100
Review scores
Source	Rating
AllMusic	4.5/5 stars
Magnet	4.5/5 stars
Pitchfork Media	(8.5/10)
PopMatters	2.5/5 stars
Uncut	3/5 stars

Earthquake Glue met with some critical acclaim. At Metacritic, which assigns a weighted average score out of 100 to reviews and ratings from mainstream critics, the album received a metascore of 78, based on 20 reviews, indicating "generally favorable reviews". Mark Deming of AllMusic said that it "may well be the most consistent and satisfying Guided By Voices album to date."

== Track listing ==
All songs written by Robert Pollard.

1. "My Kind of Soldier" – 2:36
2. "My Son, My Secretary, My Country" – 1:57
3. "I'll Replace You with Machines" – 2:49
4. "She Goes Off at Night" – 2:03
5. "Beat Your Wings" – 4:47
6. "Useless Inventions" – 2:53
7. "Dirty Water" – 3:27
8. "The Best of Jill Hives" – 2:42
9. "Dead Cloud" – 3:12
10. "Mix Up the Satellite" – 3:23
11. "The Main Street Wizards" – 3:22
12. "A Trophy Mule in Particular" – 2:19
13. "Apology in Advance" – 2:32
14. "Secret Star" – 4:42
15. "Of Mites and Men" – 2:33

== Personnel ==
The credits do not give specific instruments played by each individual, but rather list every performer who appeared on the release in any capacity.

=== GBV ===
- Robert Pollard – Vocals, composer
- Doug Gillard – performer
- Kevin March – performer
- Nate Farley – performer
- Tim Tobias – performer

=== Other/production ===
- Todd Tobias – Production, keyboards, noises, ambience
