= Guided by Voices =

American indie rock band

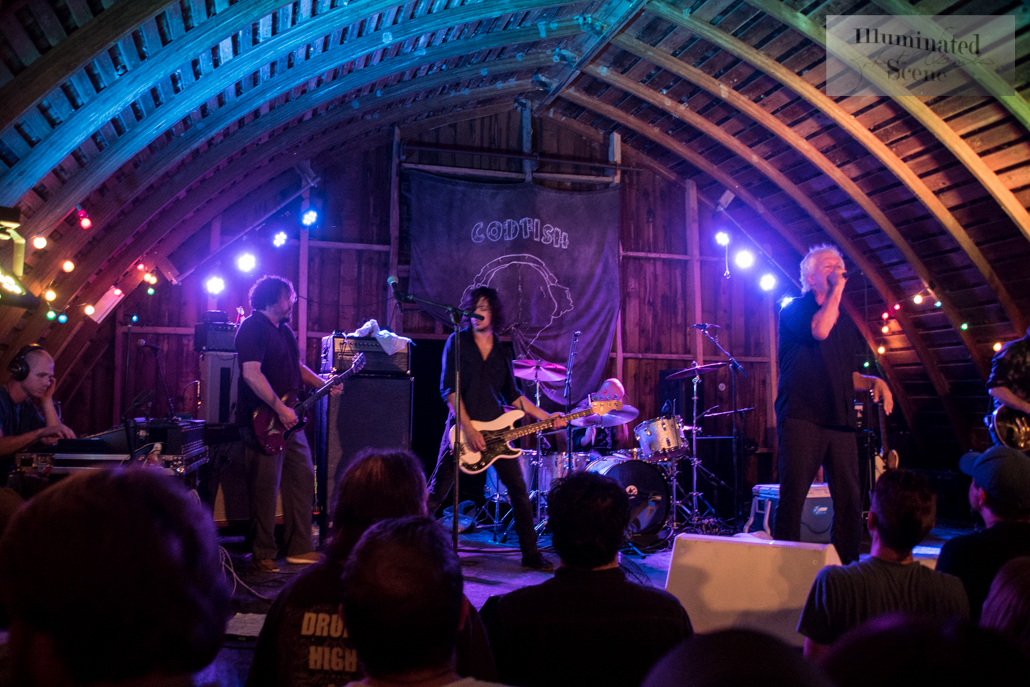
- Guided by Voices performing in 2016. Left to right: Bobby Bare Jr., Mark Shue, Kevin March, Robert Pollard, Doug Gillard.

Background information
- Origin: Dayton, Ohio, U.S.
- Genres: Indie rock; lo-fi; slacker rock; garage rock
- Works: Discography
- Years active: 1983–2004; 2010–2014; 2016–present
- Labels: Scat; Matador; TVT; Guided by Voices, Inc.; Fire; Rockathon
- Members: Robert Pollard; Doug Gillard; Kevin March; Mark Shue; Bobby Bare Jr.
- Past members: Mitch Mitchell; Tobin Sprout; Jim Pollard; Timothy Payton Earick; Kevin Fennell; Don Thrasher; Greg Demos; Dave Swanson; Jim Macpherson; Nate Farley; Tim Tobias; Dan Toohey; James Greer; Chris Slusarenko; Jon McCann; Leland Cain; Paul Comstock; Nick Mitchell; Steve Wilbur
- Website: gbv.com (website) gbvdb.com (database)

Guided by Voices is an American indie rock band formed in 1983 in Dayton, Ohio. The band had various lineup changes, with singer and songwriter Robert Pollard remaining the group's sole constant. The most well-known lineup of the band consisted of Pollard (lead vocals), his brother Jim (guitar, bass), Mitch Mitchell (lead guitars), Tobin Sprout (vocals, rhythm guitars), Kevin Fennell (drums), and bassist Greg Demos.

Guided by Voices' drew influence from early British Invasion music, garage rock, psychedelic rock, progressive rock, punk rock and post-punk. The band has had a prolific output, releasing 43 full-length albums along with many other releases, and has garnered a dedicated cult following. Originally emerging out of the lo-fi music scene during the 1980s, their songs employed Portastudio four-tracks-to-cassette production methods, and are known for their frequent brevity.

Guided by Voices initially disbanded in 2004. In 2010, the "classic" lineup reunited to perform at Matador Records' 21st anniversary party, subsequently touring and releasing six new albums. GBV broke up a second time in 2014, but Pollard again rebooted the band with a new album and a new lineup in 2016, which continues to the present day.

== History ==
=== Formation and early years (1983–1991) ===
Formed in Dayton, Ohio, in the early 1980s, Guided by Voices began their career as a bar band working the local scene. As lineups and day-jobs shifted, however, Pollard moved the band towards a studio-only orientation. Guided by Voices' recording career began with a stream of self-financed, independent releases beginning with the R.E.M.-inspired E.P. Forever Since Breakfast and followed by the albums Devil Between My Toes, Sandbox, Self-Inflicted Aerial Nostalgia, and Same Place The Fly Got Smashed. With only a few hundred copies of each album being pressed, these tended to circulate only among the band members' family and friends.

=== Lo-fi era (1992–1996) ===
With the release of the ultra-limited album Propeller in 1992 (of which only 500 copies were pressed, each with a unique, handmade cover), Guided by Voices for the first time gained some recognition outside of their hometown. This was due in part to gaining fans in the college rock circuit and bands such as Sonic Youth, R.E.M. and The Breeders. New York City and Philadelphia were host to Guided by Voices' return to the live stage (and first shows outside of Ohio) in 1993. At this time, the always-fluid Guided by Voices lineup coalesced around the core of Pollard, guitarists Tobin Sprout and Mitch Mitchell (not to be confused with Jimi Hendrix's drummer), bassist Greg Demos, and drummer Kevin Fennell. Sprout, who was briefly featured in an early-'80s version of the band, had re-joined circa Propeller and soon became Pollard's primary musical foil, in addition to contributing several of his own songs to the band's catalog. 1993 also saw the release of Vampire on Titus, as well as the Fast Japanese Spin Cycle and Static Airplane Jive EPs. Over the next year, the band began to receive national media exposure from sources such as Spin magazine.

In 1994, after culling both new songs and reams of archival recordings from GBV's history, Pollard delivered the indie landmark Bee Thousand via Scat Records, with a distribution deal through indie label Matador Records. Soon, the band officially signed with Matador, concurrent with Pollard and his bandmates finally retiring from their day jobs to work in music full-time. The band surprised early audiences accustomed to the generally shambling, lo-fi and collage-like quality of the records with their energetic live show, featuring Pollard's homegrown rock theatrics (consisting of karate-kicks, leaps, Roger Daltrey-inspired mic-twirling, later beer can throwing at rival bands), Mitch Mitchell's windmilling and chain smoking, sometime bassist Greg Demos' striped pants, a never-ending barrage of tunes that all seemed to clock in under 90 seconds, and prodigious alcohol consumption all around.

Their true Matador debut came in 1995 with Alien Lanes, which, despite a five-figure recording allowance, was constructed out of home-recorded snippets on the cheap. Much of this era was recorded on Tobin Sprout's Tascam Porta One Ministudio 4-track. The band's underground following continued to grow, with notices coming from mainstream sources such as MTV and Rolling Stone. After sessions for a concept album entitled The Power of Suck were aborted, the band assembled Under the Bushes Under the Stars out of their first 24-track studio sessions, recorded with Kim Deal and Steve Albini among others, in 1996. However, the strain of heavy touring would ultimately lead to the demise of the "classic lineup", with Sprout deciding to retire from the road in order to focus on raising his first child, his painting, and his solo musical career. Sprout and Pollard marked the occasion by releasing simultaneous solo albums on the same day in 1996: Sprout's Carnival Boy and Pollard's Not in My Airforce, with each making a guest appearance on the other's album. Pollard maintained an active, parallel solo and side project career alongside GBV releases for the remainder of that band's existence.

=== Major label records (1997–2001) ===
Pollard formed a new incarnation of Guided by Voices with members of Cleveland group Cobra Verde in 1997. The following album Mag Earwhig!, combined a new hard-rocking swagger with classic lo-fi fragments and one track, "Jane of the Waking Universe", that featured the classic lineup for one last time. However, after another year of rigorous touring, the "Guided by Verde" lineup split in late 1997 following Pollard's announcement in an interview that he intended to work with other musicians on the next Guided by Voices project.

Cobra Verde's Doug Gillard was tapped for yet another new Guided by Voices lineup in 1998, which also included "classic"-era bassist Greg Demos, former Breeders drummer Jim Macpherson, and eventually, former Amps/Breeders guitarist Nate Farley. Departing from Matador, this lineup (without Farley) worked with producer Ric Ocasek to create what was intended to be Guided by Voices' major label debut. Initially produced for Capitol Records, Do the Collapse was repeatedly delayed and finally released in mid-1999 on pseudo-indie label TVT. (In the UK it was released on Creation Records). Featuring a slick, heavily processed sound previously foreign to GBV albums, Do the Collapse failed to garner radio airplay, and was for the most part greeted with mixed reviews.

Through touring heavily throughout 1999 and 2000, Guided by Voices' live shows often stretched past the three-hour mark, populated by a stream of new and classic songs, Pollard solo tracks, impromptu covers of The Who, David Bowie and The Rolling Stones. In addition to multiple swings through the United States and Europe, 2000 saw the band's first and only visits to Australia, New Zealand, and Japan. 2000 was concluded with the release of Suitcase, four discs and 100 songs from three decades worth of Pollard's reserve of unreleased material. (Three more box sets of unreleased songs, Suitcase 2, Suitcase 3 and Suitcase 4 released in October 2005, November 2009 and November 2015 respectively.)

2001's Isolation Drills was recorded with Rob Schnapf, who aimed to capture the band's live sound more closely than did Ocasek. Though the album debuted in Billboard's top 200 and received higher critical notices than its predecessor, it did not achieve the sought-after radio breakthrough.

=== Later years (2002–2004) ===
After departing from TVT in 2002, Guided by Voices returned to Matador and released Universal Truths and Cycles, a departure from the previous two radio-aspiring albums, and a return to the band's mid-90s, mid-fi aesthetic. Universal Truths producer Todd Tobias would also record the band's final two albums for Matador. 2003 saw the release of the prog-styled Earthquake Glue, followed by the anthology box set Hardcore UFOs: Revelations, Epiphanies and Fast Food in the Western Hemisphere and the greatest hits compilation Best of Guided by Voices: Human Amusements at Hourly Rates.

In 2004, Pollard announced he was disbanding Guided by Voices following the release of the Half Smiles of the Decomposed LP, and a final farewell tour. Pollard stated:

"This feels like the last album for Guided by Voices. I've always said that when I make a record that I'm totally satisfied with as befitting a final album, then that will be it. And this is it."

On November 9, 2004, Guided by Voices performed on the stage of Austin City Limits, broadcast by PBS on January 22, 2005. Their last television appearance was on Late Night with Conan O'Brien on December 2, 2004. They played the single, "Everybody Thinks I'm a Raincloud (When I'm Not Looking)". After a select round of final US shows, Guided by Voices played their final show at The Metro in Chicago on December 31, 2004. The four-hour, 63-song marathon finale is documented on the DVD The Electrifying Conclusion.

=== Post-GBV (2005–2009) ===
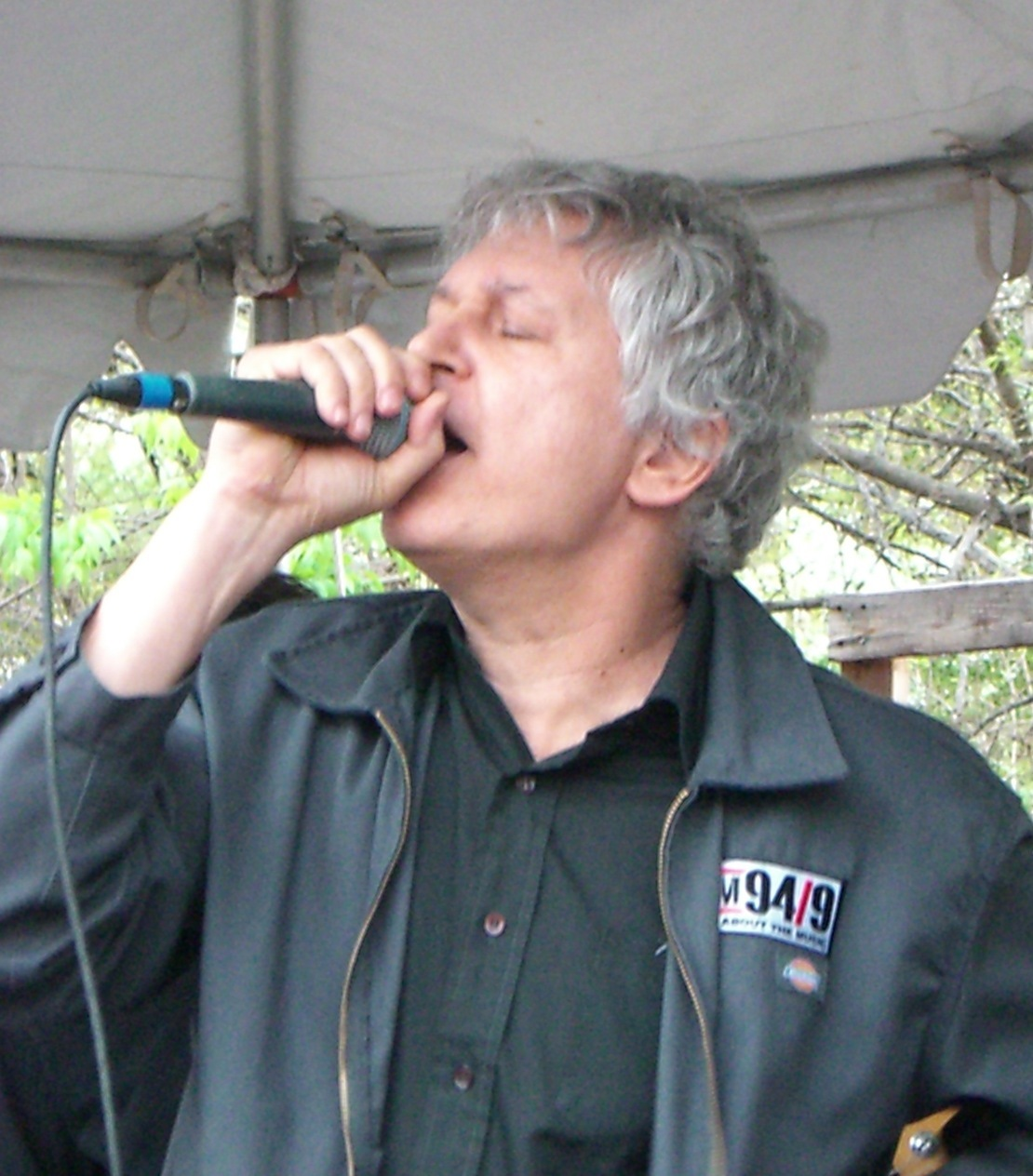
Lead singer and principal songwriter Robert Pollard in 2006

Pollard released his first post-GBV album in 2006 on Merge Records. The album, titled From a Compound Eye was a double LP produced by Todd Tobias. Later Pollard albums have been released on Merge and Pollard's own label, Guided by Voices Inc. The GBV song "Everyone Thinks I'm a Raincloud (When I'm Not Looking)" was featured in the soundtrack for MLB 2K6.

Following GBV's demise, Pollard was frequently asked about band reunions. In 2007 he told MAGNET: "To me, it's just cashing in. If you're gonna get the band back together, it should be to support a new record, not just to play the hits. That's like doing the county-fair circuit. I don't see Guided By Voices reforming. For one thing, there were 50 or 60 people in Guided By Voices over time."

Pollard also commented on the fact that GBV and his solo output are basically the same, when he told Harp magazine, in 2005, "You know, a lot of people try to distinguish things between what is Robert Pollard and what is Guided By Voices. I tell them basically that there is no difference; I am Robert Pollard and I am Guided By Voices."

In 2008, Pollard admitted to almost bringing GBV back for his album Robert Pollard Is Off to Business but decided against it, instead forming a new label titled Guided by Voices Inc.

The 1998–1999 lineup of the band reunited for a few songs, for Pollard's 50th birthday in 2007.

In October 2008, it was announced that Guided by Voices' music would be used for a 3-D film musical based on the life of Cleopatra to be directed by Steven Soderbergh with script by James Greer. Soderbergh and Greer would rewrite the lyrics of the songs to fit the story. Soderbergh had previously used a Guided by Voices song in his film Full Frontal, and wrote an introduction to a book on the band. Pollard wrote the soundtrack to Soderbergh's film Bubble, and that music was released as Music for 'Bubble'. Guided by Voices and Pollard posters, t-shirts, and songs appeared frequently on British sit-com The IT Crowd.

=== Reunion (2010–2014) ===
In June 2010, Matador Records announced that the "Classic '93–'96 Lineup" would reunite to perform at the label's 21st Anniversary celebration in Las Vegas, in October of that year. A full reunion tour was subsequently announced, with the band selling out nearly every date. The tour included stops at Hoboken's Maxwell's and the Southgate House in Newport, Kentucky, two venues that the band had built a history with due to legendary shows there in the past. When asked by Spinner if there might ever be another proper GBV record Pollard said "I've thought about it sometimes but it's a very long shot," he says. "We all kind of do our own thing. I'm not completely eliminating the possibility."

On September 21, 2011, it was announced that a new GBV album, Let's Go Eat the Factory, had been recorded for release in January 2012.

On January 4, 2012, the band performed their single "The Unsinkable Fats Domino" on the Late Show with David Letterman to promote Let's Go Eat the Factory. During their performance, bassist Greg Demos fell while attempting a dance move. However, Demos was not seriously injured and the band continued to perform their song.

The band canceled what was to have been their first post-reunion show in the UK at the All Tomorrow's Parties 'I'll Be Your Mirror' festival at Alexandra Palace, London, in May 2012 as well as a planned appearance at the Primavera Sound festival in Barcelona. The band's management denied reports that the cancellations were due to them splitting up again and confirmed they were still working on new material.

The band released a second post-reformation LP, Class Clown Spots a UFO, on June 12, 2012. Generally regarded by fans as the best of the latter-years' albums, it marked a return in tenor and quality to this line-up's mid-90s heyday. A third, The Bears for Lunch, followed in November. GBV began touring again in September 2012 with a 13 show "Tour of the South", starting in Dayton, Ohio, on September 8, 2012, which included gigs in Cleveland and Pittsburgh, and stops in North Carolina, Florida, Georgia, New Orleans, Texas (Houston and Austin), Missouri and Kansas, with the final show on September 29, 2012, in St. Louis. Another album, English Little League, was released in 2013.

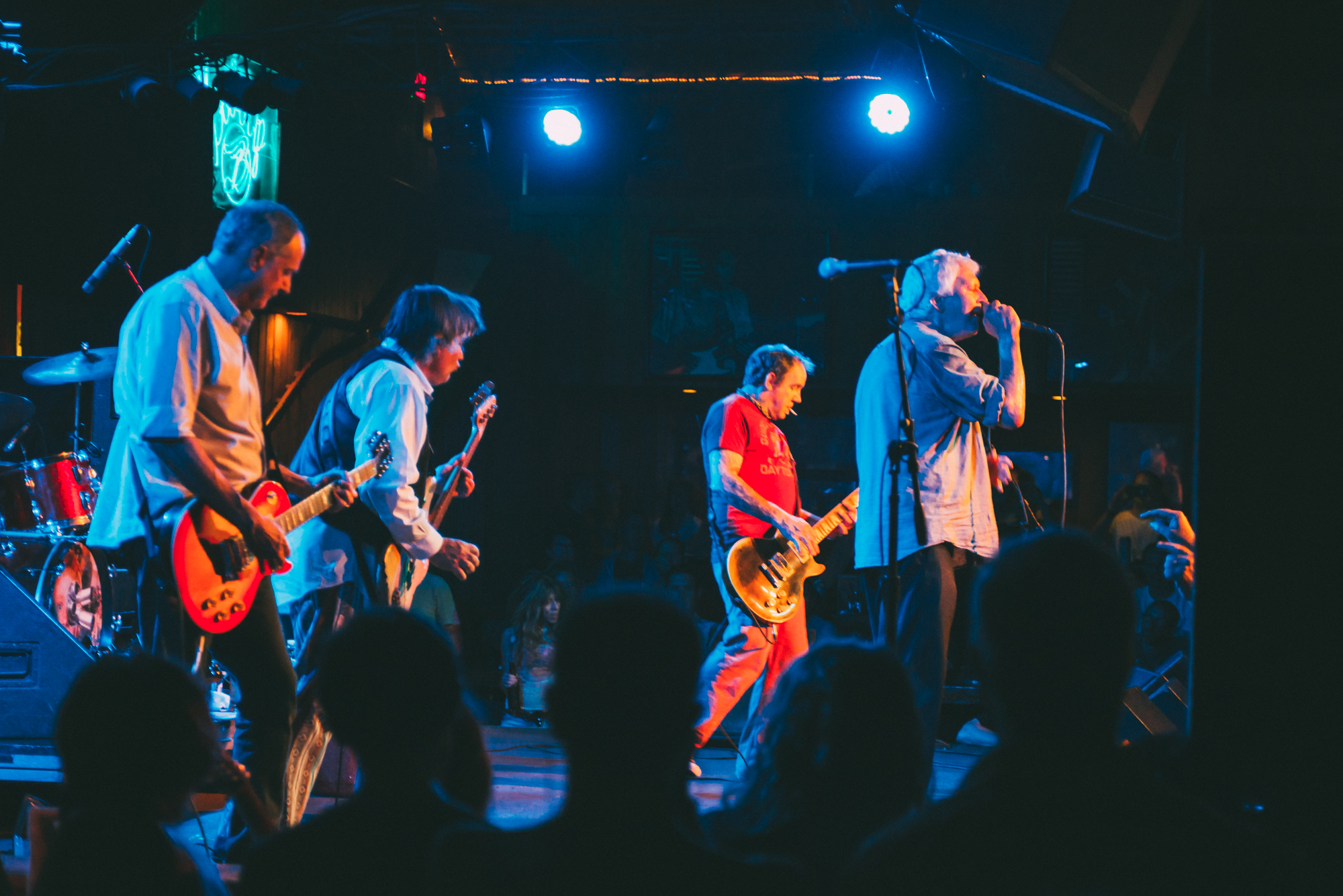
Guided by Voices performing in 2014

In a July 2013 interview with Magnet magazine, Pollard stated that English Little League could be the final GBV album. However, in September, a fifth reunion record, Motivational Jumpsuit, was confirmed for release on Guided by Voices Inc. and Fire Records in February 2014. Drummer Kevin Fennell was replaced by Kevin March for the sixth reunion album, Cool Planet, which was released on May 13, 2014.

On September 18, 2014, GBV abruptly released a statement on Facebook that they had once again disbanded. Remaining tour dates were canceled.

=== Second reunion (2016–present) ===
In February 2016, the official Guided by Voices Facebook page announced that GBV has been announced to headline the Sled Island Festival on June 25 and that a "strikingly fresh Guided By Voices album in the works", on which Pollard plays all the instruments. Pollard subsequently confirmed the new lineup for the band which would include returning drummer Kevin March along with newcomers guitarist Bobby Bare Jr., guitarist Nick Mitchell and bassist Mark Shue.

After the band's set on July 14, 2016 at the Grog Shop in Cleveland, when the band was expected to return to the stage for an encore, Nick Mitchell was fired in the dressing room next to the stage. Mitchell was replaced by former member Doug Gillard, who subsequently rejoined Guided by Voices permanently later that month.

On January 25, 2017, the band announced their first double album August by Cake for release on April 7, 2017, and released a new song, "Hiking Skin." The album was also Robert Pollard's 100th album. On March 10, the band premiered another new song from the upcoming album, "Dr. Feelgood Falls Off the Ocean".

On June 22, 2017, Guided by Voices announced another new album for 2017, titled How Do You Spell Heaven, which was released on August 11. The band also released a new single from the upcoming album Just to Show You.

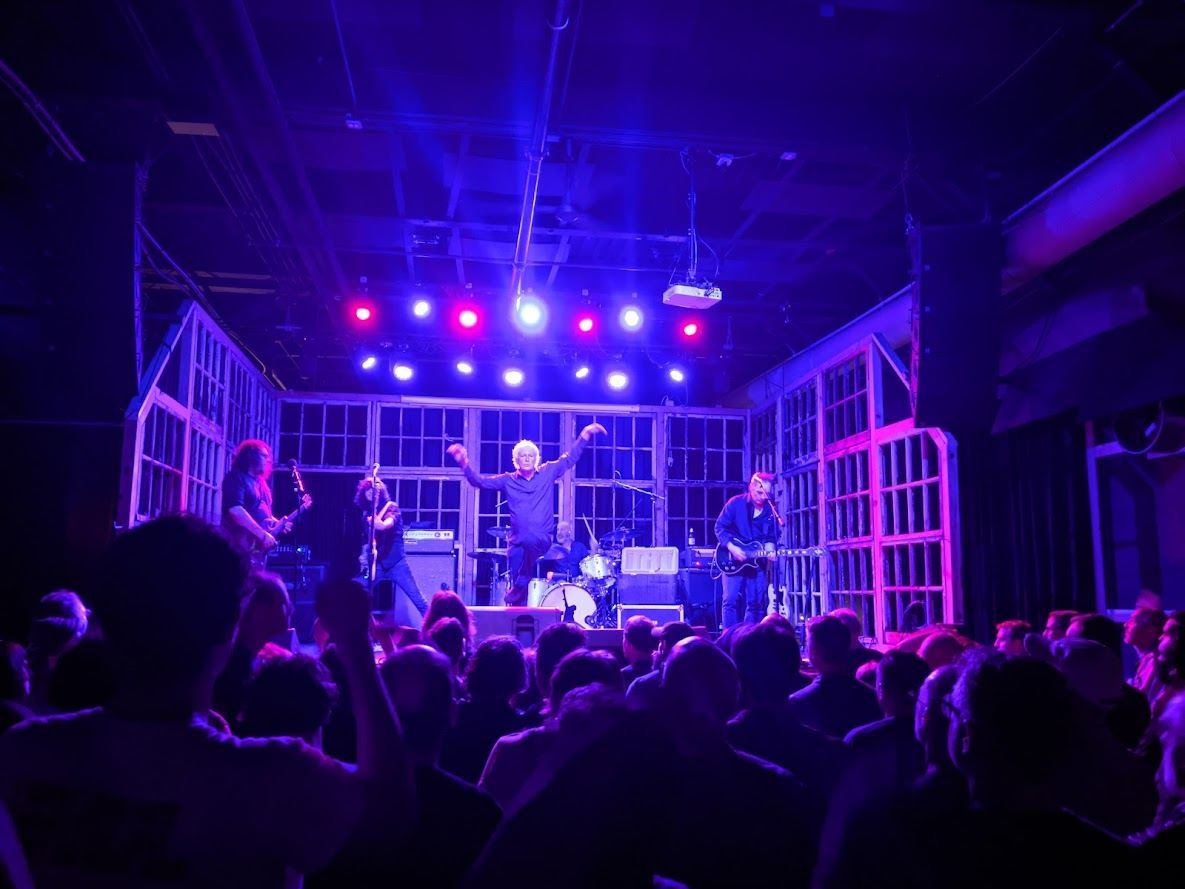
Guided By Voices performing at Tellus 360 in Lancaster, PA, October 8, 2021

On December 8 of the same year, the band announced another album to be released the following March entitled Space Gun, and released the title track as a single.

In 2018, Guided by Voices announced the future release of the double album Zeppelin Over China and Warp and Woof for 2019. They also made their 7" single, "You Own the Night" available for pre-order containing singles from both albums.

In 2019, the band released Zeppelin Over China, Warp and Woof and Sweating the Plague and in 2020 went on to release three more albums, Surrender Your Poppy Field, Mirrored Aztec and Styles We Paid For.

In 2021, the band released Earth Man Blues in April 2021, It's Not Them. It Couldn't Be Them. It Is Them! in October 2021, and Crystal Nuns Cathedral, which was released on March 4, 2022.

Tremblers and Goggles by Rank and the compilation Scalping the Guru rounded out 2022, followed by La La Land, Welshpool Frillies, and Nowhere to Go but Up in 2023. Strut of Kings was announced in April 2024 and released in June. Then, In November 2024, they announced another album titled Universe Room. It would be released on February 7th, 2025.

Their 44th album, Thick Rich and Delicious, was released in October 2025. Pollard told an interviewer the band would not tour in support of the album, having decided to stop playing live: "I feel too old to get onstage."

On February 25, 2026, their 45th album Crawlspace of the Pantheon was announced concurrently with the release of its lead single "We Outlast Them All". The album is scheduled for release on May 29.

== Musical style ==
Guided by Voices have been categorized as indie rock, alternative rock and lofi, with compositions that Mark Deming of AllMusic said were "infectiously brief pop songs". The band's early releases were described as "amateur recordings that included audible mistakes, eclectic instrumentation, and haphazard songwriting". The band is influenced by the stylings of the British Invasion and progressive rock.

== Band members ==
It's been said over fifty musicians have contributed to the band. The following is a list of all known members.

Current

- Robert Pollard – lead vocals (1983–2004, 2010–2014, 2016–present), guitar (1983–1992)
- Doug Gillard – guitar, backing vocals (1997–2004, 2016–present)
- Kevin March – drums, backing vocals (2002–2004, 2014, 2016–present)
- Mark Shue – bass, backing vocals (2016–present)
- Bobby Bare Jr. – guitar, backing vocals (2016–present)

Former

- Jim Pollard – guitar, bass (1983–1995, 2012)
- Mitch Mitchell – guitar (1983–1997, 2010–2014), bass (1983–1987)
- Tobin Sprout – guitar, vocals (1986–1997, 2010–2014)
- Kevin Fennell – drums (1983–1989, 1993–1997, 2010–2014)
- Greg Demos – bass (1990–1992, 1994–2000, 2010–2014)
- Paul Comstock – guitar (1983)
- Ed John – guitar (1984)
- Mitch Swann – guitar (1986)
- Don Thrasher – drums (1989–1992)
- Steve Wilbur – bass, guitar (1987–1989)
- Dan Toohey – bass (1991–1994)
- James Greer – bass,(1994–1996)
- Bruce "Smitty" Smith – drums (1983, 1989)
- Dave Swanson – drums (1997–1998)
- Jim Macpherson – drums (1998–2001)
- Jon McCann – drums (2001–2002)
- Nate Farley – guitar (1998–2004)
- Tim Tobias – bass (2000–2003)
- Chris Slusarenko – bass (2003–2004)
- Nick Mitchell – guitar, vocals (2016)
- John Petkovic – guitar (1997–1998)
- Don Depew – bass (1997–1998)
- Larry Keller – drums (1994–1995)
- Craig "Craig-O" Nichols – drums (1995)
- Nick Schuld – bass (1997)
- Peyton Eric – drums (1986, 1989)
- Joe Buben – drums (1996)
- Leland Cain – bass (1996)

Former touring members

- Matt Sweeney – bass (1996)
- Sam Powers – bass (2003)

Timeline

== Discography ==
- Devil Between My Toes (1987)
- Sandbox (1987)
- Self-Inflicted Aerial Nostalgia (1989)
- Same Place the Fly Got Smashed (1990)
- Propeller (1992)
- Vampire on Titus (1993)
- Bee Thousand (1994)
- Alien Lanes (1995)
- Under the Bushes Under the Stars (1996)
- Tonics & Twisted Chasers (1996)
- Mag Earwhig! (1997)
- Do the Collapse (1999)
- Isolation Drills (2001)
- Universal Truths and Cycles (2002)
- Earthquake Glue (2003)
- Half Smiles of the Decomposed (2004)
- Let's Go Eat the Factory (2012)
- Class Clown Spots a UFO (2012)
- The Bears for Lunch (2012)
- English Little League (2013)
- Motivational Jumpsuit (2014)
- Cool Planet (2014)
- Please Be Honest (2016)
- August by Cake (2017)
- How Do You Spell Heaven (2017)
- Space Gun (2018)
- Zeppelin Over China (2019)
- Warp and Woof (2019)
- Sweating the Plague (2019)
- Surrender Your Poppy Field (2020)
- Mirrored Aztec (2020)
- Styles We Paid For (2020)
- Earth Man Blues (2021)
- It's Not Them. It Couldn't Be Them. It Is Them! (2021)
- Crystal Nuns Cathedral (2022)
- Tremblers and Goggles by Rank (2022)
- La La Land (2023)
- Welshpool Frillies (2023)
- Nowhere to Go but Up (2023)
- Strut of Kings (2024)
- Universe Room (2025)
- Thick Rich and Delicious (2025)
- Crawlspace of the Pantheon (2026)
