= Mute (album) =

Compilation album by Various artists
- Released: March 14, 2000
- Genre: Indie rock/Post rock
- Length: 70:09
- Label: Hush Records
- Producer: Chad Crouch; Rob Jones

Professional ratings
Review scores
Source	Rating
Splendid E-Zine	link
Delusions of Adequacy	link^{[usurped]}

Mute is a compilation album released in 2000 on Hush Records. The disc of instrumental music is a sampler of the label's roster.

== Track listing ==
1. "Gypsymothcaravan", performed by The Sensualists – 4:07
2. "Nova", performed by Tracker – 2:49
3. "Centralia", performed by Norfolk & Western – 5:09
4. "Make Out Music for the Emotionally Impaired", performed by Beltline – 3:20
5. "Ceiling Fan [Remix]", performed by Kaitlyn Ni Donovan – 5:55
6. "Concerto in Zed Minor for Shoestring Orchestra", performed by Brother Egg – 3:30
7. "Wistful", performed by Boy Crazy – 1:57
8. "Left-handed", performed by Chad Crouch – 3:18
9. "Endure", performed by Peter Miser – 4:11
10. "Parisienne [Dub Version]", performed by Rice Cream – 3:47
11. "Edinburgh", performed by Ovian – 5:15
12. "Close Yet Far", performed by King Pang – 3:32
13. "Playground", performed by E Vax – 4:12
14. "Teenage Qix", performed by Bossa Nova 2600 – 2:56
15. "Microhome", performed by Wow & Flutter – 6:33
16. "Later On", performed by Jeff London – 3:05
17. "New York City", performed by Corrina Repp – 4:26
18. "End of Amnesia", performed by Matt Ward – 2:07
