= Fucking A (disambiguation) =

Fucking A may refer to:

- Fucking A, a play written by American playwright Suzan-Lori Parks.
- Fuckin A, an album by The Thermals
- Fuckin' A, an album by Anal Cunt
