= La Carreta Mexican Restaurant =

Mexican restaurant in Portland, Oregon, U.S.

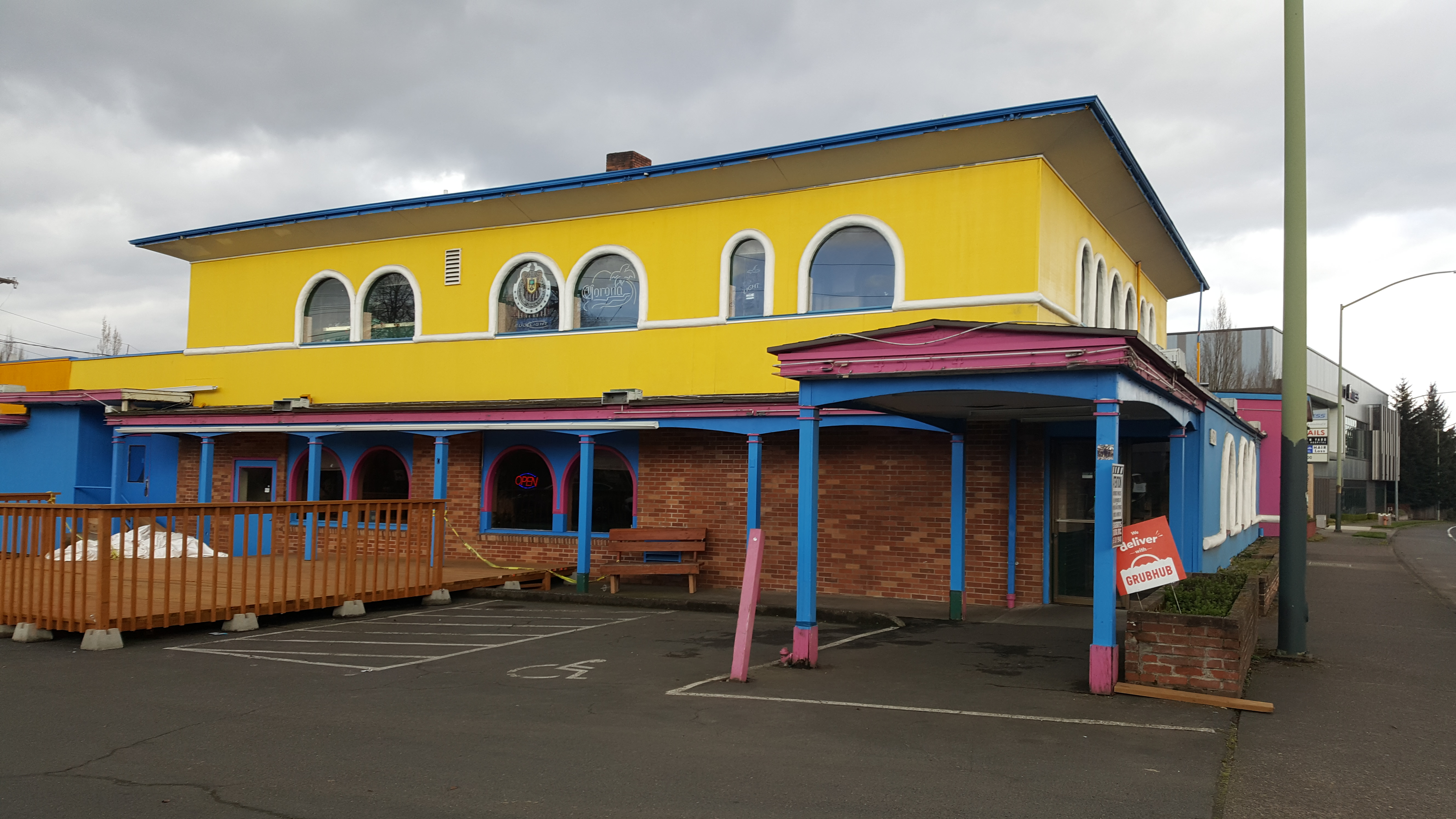
- The restaurant's exterior in 2021
- Interactive map of La Carreta Mexican Restaurant

Restaurant information
- Established: 1990
- Food type: Mexican
- Location: 4534 Southeast McLoughlin Boulevard, Portland, Multnomah, Oregon, 97202, United States
- Coordinates: 45.4900°N 122.6531°W

La Carreta Mexican Restaurant was a Mexican restaurant in Portland, Oregon. The menu offered traditional cuisine including burritos, chile rellenos, chimichangas, enchiladas, fajitas, flautas, quesadilla, taquitos, and tostadas. Established in 1990, La Carreta had a banquet hall upstairs and hosted a variety of events. The restaurant's colorful interior featured hanging plants, murals, flags, tiled tables, and stucco walls.

The restaurant received a generally positive reception, especially for its margaritas and other drink options. La Carreta closed permanently and a food cart pod called Brooklyn Carreta opened on the site in 2025.

== Description ==
La Carreta Mexican Restaurant was located at the intersection of McLoughlin and Holgate Boulevards in southeast Portland's Brooklyn neighborhood. Willamette Week's Martin Cizmar described the restaurant as a "mazelike Mexican roadhouse", with murals of people and prickly pears on stucco walls. The interior had hanging plants, some of which were decorated with small American and Mexican flags. There were tiled tables, chairs upholstered with traditional blankets, and booths.

In 2013, the Portland Mercury's Ned Lannamann described La Carreta as a "funky, homey Mexican joint" serving "ample Mexican fare and dizzying margaritas". Lannamann continued, "It's a Portland old-school favorite, unsullied by the hands of hipsterdom." The second level had a private banquet hall for events. La Carreta operated until midnight on weekdays and 2 a.m. on weekends. The magazine PDX Parent described the restaurant as "spacious and colorful" and noted children could eat for free on Mondays, Tuesdays, and Wednesdays after 4 p.m.

=== Menu ===
The menu offered Mexican cuisine such as burritos, chile colorado, chile rellenos, chimichangas, enchiladas, fajitas (chicken or beef), tostadas, tortillas, rice and beans, and chips and salsa; meals ended with a complementary scoop of ice cream with whipped cream and chocolate syrup. As of 2002, the Fiesta Platter featured quesadillas with green chili and Monterey Jack cheese, flautas with shredded beef, taquitos, and "deluxe" nachos. The drink menu included more than 20 varieties of tequila as of 2002, when blended margaritas were available for $2 during happy hour. As recently as 2015, the drink menu also included margaritas, beers, and coffee cocktails. The La Carreta coffee blended beans with Baileys Irish Cream, Frangelico, and Kahlúa, and was topped with whipped cream and a cherry.

== History ==
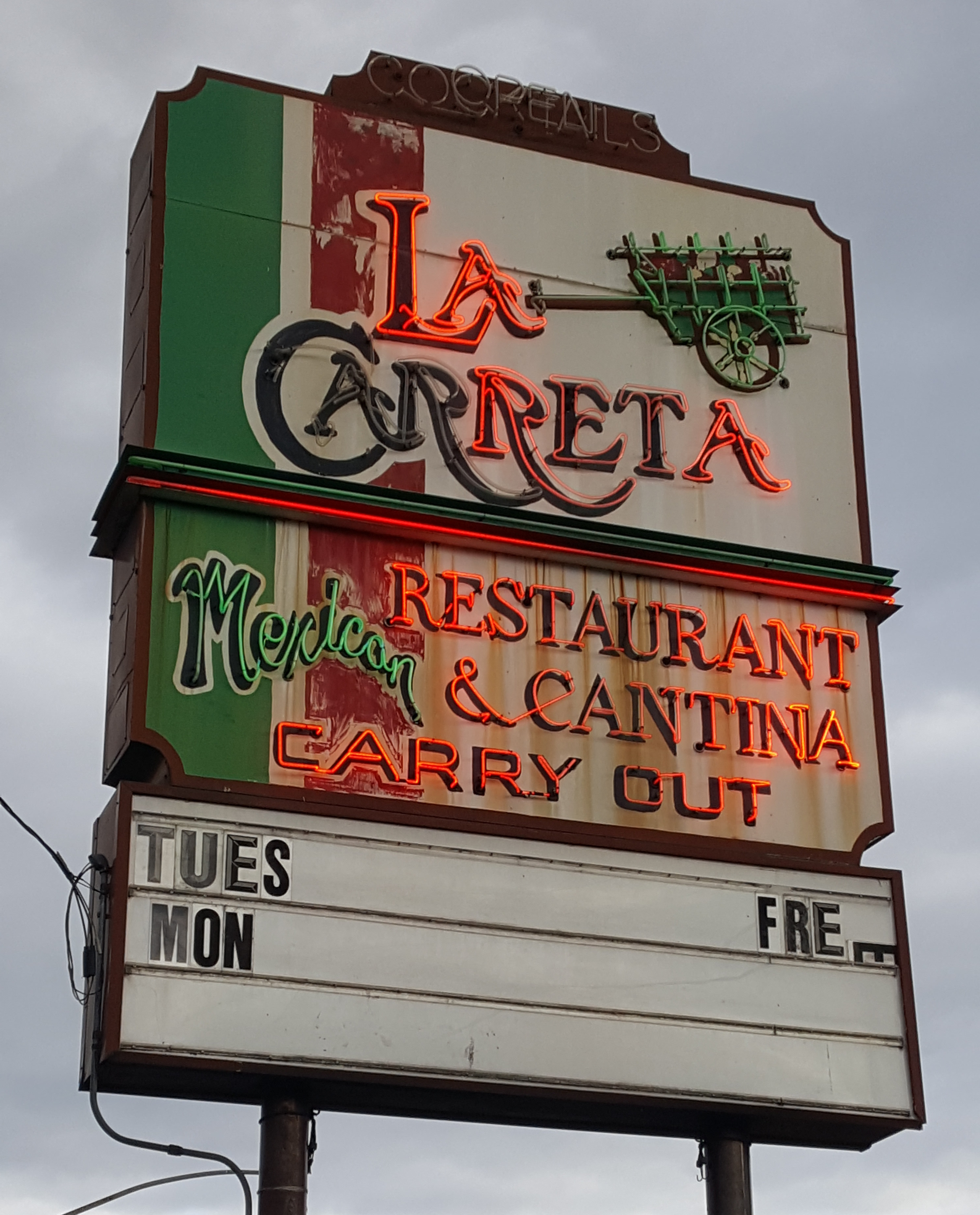
Sign outside the restaurant, 2021

The site occupied by La Carreta previously housed a Waddle's Drive-In restaurant. La Carreta opened in 1990, according to its website.

Novelist Peter Rock references La Carreta in The Bewildered: A Novel (2005). The restaurant closed permanently and a food cart pod called Brooklyn Carreta opened on the site previously occupied by La Carreta in 2025.

=== Events ===
La Carreta hosted a variety of events. In 1991, the restaurant hosted the Portland–Guadalajara Sister City Association's eighth-anniversary celebration. The event was attended by former Portland City Commissioner Mildred Schwab and sister city scholarship recipients, featuring cantina music.

In 2001, a representative from the Oregon Employment Department delivered a presentation on labor issues on behalf of the Pacific Printing & Imaging Association. The restaurant hosted a gathering following the death of a Vietnam War veteran and Purple Heart recipient in 2005.

The Portland Mercury co-hosted the 2014 La Carreta Meltdown, a rock and roll show benefiting the Sisters of the Road nonprofit cafe located in Portland, with performances by the Pynnacles, Eyelids (including John Moen), and Hutch Harris of The Thermals. The Multnomah County Republican Party's 2020 Lincoln Day dinner at the restaurant featured chairman James Buchal as a guest speaker, as well as state representative Mike Nearman and local political candidates.

== Reception ==
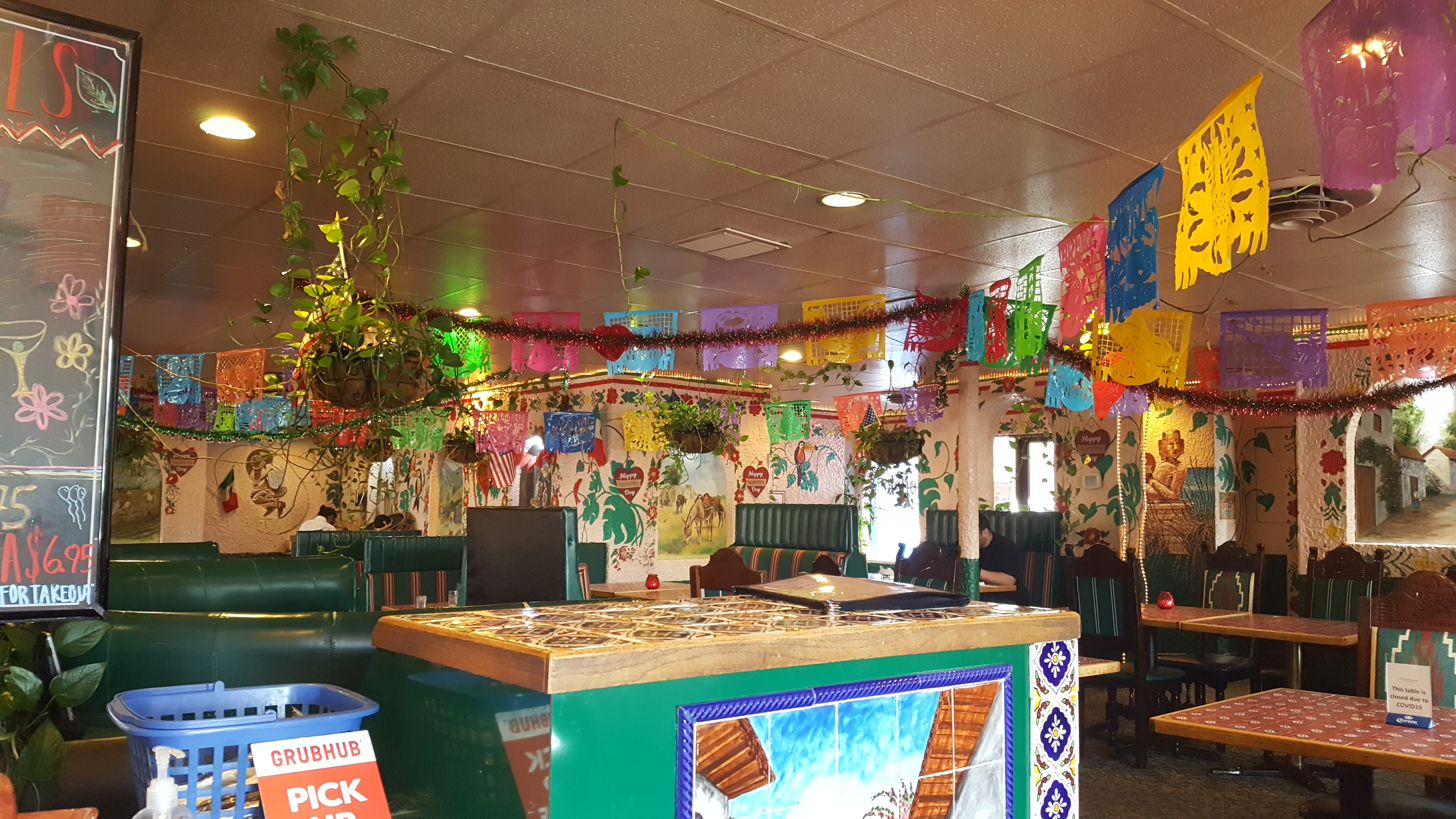
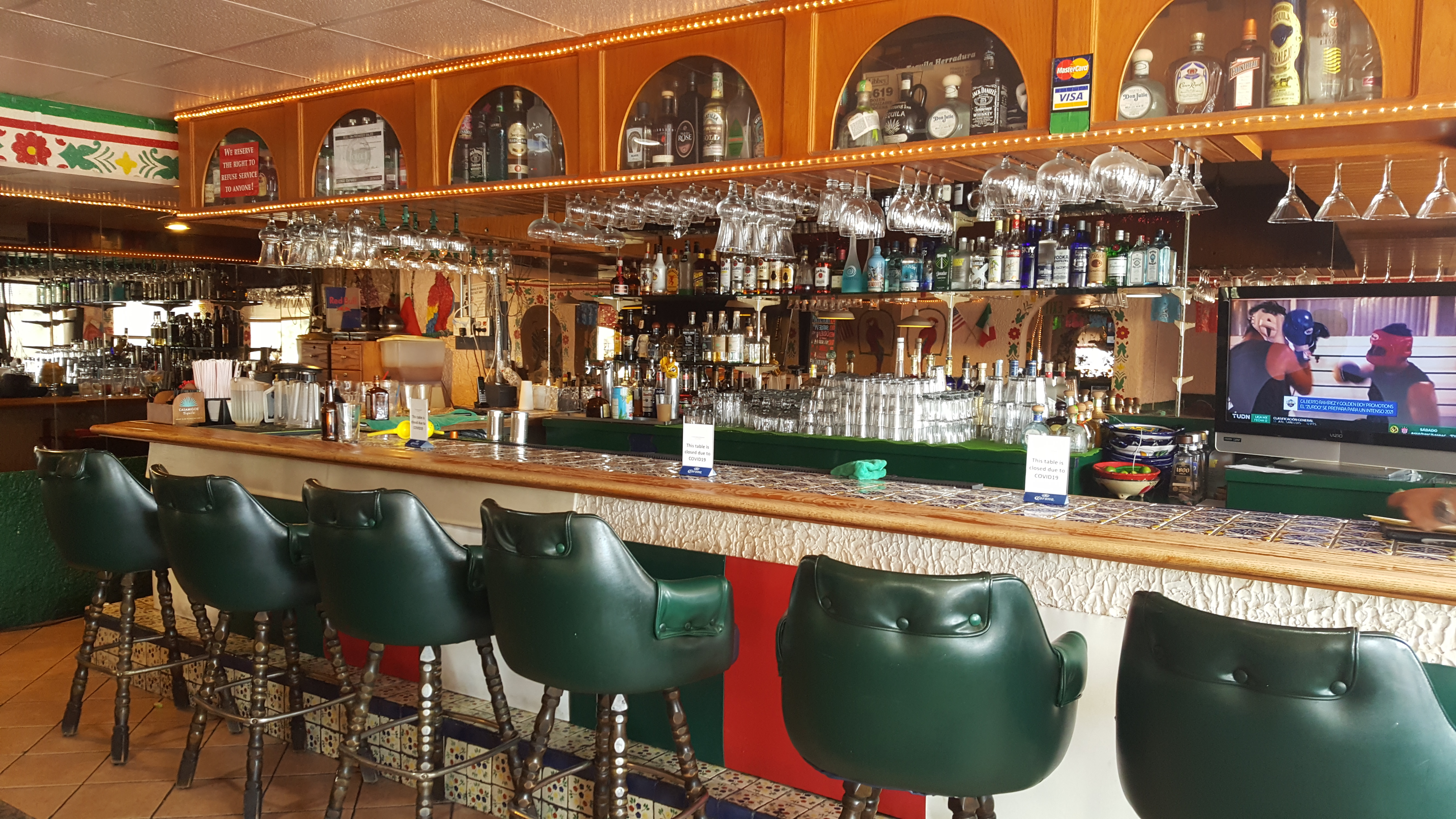
The restaurant's interior in 2021

Writing for The Oregonian in 2002, Susan Fitzgerald described La Carreta's atmosphere as "cheery faux-Mexican" and recommended the restaurant for comfort food. After describing the menu, she wrote, "Pair any of these options with a bottomless basket of fresh, warm tortilla chips and salsa, and you'll end up nicely carbo-loaded for a long winter nap." The newspaper's Kyle O'Brien said La Carreta offered the "best margarita on the cheap" and recommended the "tasty and cool" happy hour margaritas. He wrote, "At these prices, might as well get two while wolfing down the decent chips and salsa. The old-school cantina pipes in Mexi-Muzak over the sound system to ensure a bueno time."

In 2008, La Carreta was named the "best Mexican restaurant" in a "City's Best" survey published by AOL's CityGuide. In 2015, Cizmar ranked La Carreta the city's best sit-down, midrange family-style Mexican restaurant, as well as Portland's best Mexican restaurant for drinks. He described the atmosphere as "fully immersive" and complimented the beef enchiladas and frozen strawberry margaritas. Cizmar also called the La Carreta coffee "very nice", but described the salsa as "watery" and "not very spicy" and said the rice and beans were "nothing to get excited about".

In addition to performing at La Carreta, members of Eyelids frequented the restaurant. In a 2014 article about the group, John Chandler of Vortex Music Magazine described La Carreta as a "venerable Mexican eatery ... known for its roving band of mariachis, dubious cuisine and towering cocktails".

== See also ==
- Hispanics and Latinos in Portland, Oregon
- List of Mexican restaurants
