= Wind-Up Canary =

Studio album by Casey Dienel
- Released: March 2006
- Recorded: 2005
- Genre: Indie pop
- Length: 48:57
- Label: Hush Records
- Producers: Djim Reynolds and Casey Dienel

Professional ratings
Review scores
Source	Rating
Allmusic	4/5 stars
Pitchfork Media	7.6/10 stars
PopMatters	7/10 stars
Wired	Favorable

Wind-Up Canary is the 2006 debut album by American singer-songwriter Casey Dienel.

== Album ==
Over the winter of 2005, Dienel recorded Wind-Up Canary in a farmhouse in Leominster, Massachusetts, with friends from her time at the New England Conservatory of Music and a piano borrowed from a nearby hotel lobby.

Dienel is accompanied on the album by Peter Bitenc, Ben MacDonald, Christopher MacDonald, Juliet Nelson, Mike Olson, Rachael Price, Djim Reynolds, and Michael Winograd. According to the liner notes, it is "dedicated to the eccentrics, the non-believers, the hope-seekers, the meek-and-the-mild, the downtrodden, and the relentless dreamers everywhere. You're not the only canaries out amongst the world, so please keep singing."

Dienel, then 20, released the album in 2006 with Hush Records.

== Musical style ==
Writing in CMJ New Music Monthly, Steve Ciabottoni described the album as a "whimsical, lo-fi debut...With touches of saloon tunes, marches and coffeehouse folk, Dienel's song swing between genres and eras like Rufus Wainwright and Regina Spektor." Writing at NPR on the release of Wind-Up Canary, Michael Katzif described Dienel's style as an "intricate and melodic mixture of jazz, rock and the American songbook." In Pitchfork, reviewer Stephen Deusner said Dienel's "songs show traces of Nellie McKay's subversive formalism, Regina Spektor's bizarro cabaret, and Tori Amos's sweeping scope, but Dienel could be just as easily and fruitfully compared to those outside her camp-- to the Decemberists or Clem Snide or to literary types like George Saunders and Z.Z. Packer, whose short stories share an oddball sensibility and heart-rent humor with Dienel's story songs."

== Reception ==
The album received favorable reviews. In Pitchfork, the album received a 7.6 rating on the site's 10-point scale and AllMusic gave the album four of five stars, with reviewer Stewart Mason calling the album "a compelling, highly enjoyable debut" and describing Dienel as having "a sparkling personality all her own" as well as being "an impressively strong melodicist." PopMatters gave the album seven out of ten stars; reviewer Dave Heaton said the "debut album should get widely recognized for how fresh and how unlike everything else the music is. Her seamless blend of styles and genres into one that she alone occupies should get her a lot of attention…and for good reason. Her music is endlessly spellbinding." The Wired review said, "I'm totally smitten by her lackadaisical and smiling style, somewhere between Fiona Apple, Mirah and Sarah Harmer, and the album's a consistent spring-time pleasure."

== Track listing ==
All songs written by Casey Dienel.

1. "Doctor Monroe" – 4:34
2. "Everything" – 3:04
3. "Baby James" – 3:27
4. "Cabin Fever" – 5:23
5. "Frankie and Annette" – 3:13
6. "The Coffee Beanery" – 4:54
7. "Embroidery" – 3:23
8. "Fat Old Man" – 3:34
9. "Stationary" – 4:02
10. "Tundra" – 5:19
11. "All or Nothing" – 3:58
12. "The La La Song" – 4:06
