= The High Violets =

American dream pop band

- Origin: Portland, Oregon, United States
- Genres: Shoegaze; Dream pop Alternative rock
- Years active: 1998–present
- Labels: Saint Marie Records; Comet Rock Records; Reverb Records
- Members: Kaitlyn Ni Donovan - vocals, guitar Clint Sargent - lead guitar, vocals Colin Sheridan - bass guitar Luke Strahota - drums
- Past members: Violet Bianca Grace (vocals, bass); Allen Davis (bass); Aaron Overstreet (bass)
- Website: thehighviolets.com

The High Violets are an American dream pop band from Portland, Oregon, United States.

== History ==
The High Violets were formed in late 1998 after the breakup of Portland band The Bella Low by former members Clint Sargent, Luke Strahota and Violet Bianca Grace. This lineup was short-lived however as Grace left after a few gigs. Sargent and Strahota then joined forces with Allen Davis of Echoplex. Soon after Sargent recruited Kaitlyn Ni Donovan to complete the line up. After self-releasing an EP entitled Dream Away, they signed to Irish label Reverb Records and released 44 Down in 2002. Four years later, they followed up with the critically acclaimed To Where You Are, also on Reverb. The group also performed at SXSW in 2006. In 2007, they performed at NXNE and released a remix album, Satellite Remixes, which featured Ulrich Schnauss and Carmen Rizzo among others. Although the band is currently on hiatus from touring and live performances they have been active in the studio. Their fifth full-length album Heroes and Halos, released April 1, 2016, was listed on PopMatters 10 Best Shoegaze and Dream pop Albums 2016. In 2021 they released the B-Sides & Rarities album.

== Discography ==
- Dream Away EP (Self Released 2000)
- 44 Down EP (Reverb Records, 2002)
- Invitation EP (Self Released 2005)
- To Where You Are (Reverb, 2006)
- Satellite Remixes (Reverb, 2007)
- Cinema (Comet Rock, 2010)
- Heroes and Halos (Saint Marie Records, 2016)
- B-Sides & Rarities (Comet Rock, 2021)

== Compilations ==
- Northwestern Presents... Rock Stars Attack! (2000)
- NW Shoegazer Bliss (2002)
- In a Different Place (2003)
- Fuzzy Ball (2004)
- MusicfestNW '06 (2006)
- Missing Deadlines - Ulrich Schnauss Remixes (2010)
- Rock Back for Japan, volume 5 (2011)
- Static Waves Saint Marie Records (2012)
- Static Waves 2 Saint Marie Records (2013)
- Static Waves 3 Saint Marie Records (2014)
- Static Waves 4 Saint Marie Records (2015)

== Song appearances in media ==
The High Violets songs have been featured in various television shows, including:

- MTV Fraternity Life
- MTV Sorority Life
- CW Life Unexpected
- Direct TV You Me Her

The High Violets song Chinese Letter Remix (Ulrich Schnauss remix) was featured in the film and film soundtrack Water Wings.
