= Fuckin A =

Album by The Thermals

Studio album by The Thermals
- Released: May 18, 2004
- Recorded: Avast! Studios; Seattle, Washington, 2004
- Genre: Indie rock, punk rock
- Length: 27:54
- Label: Sub Pop
- Producer: Chris Walla

The Thermals chronology
| More Parts per Million (2003) | Fuckin A (2004) | The Body, The Blood, The Machine (2006) |

Singles from Fuckin A
- 1. "How We Know" Released: 2004

Professional ratings
Aggregate scores
| Source | Rating |
|---|---|
| Metacritic | 72/100 |
Review scores
| Source | Rating |
| Allmusic | 3.5/5 stars |
| Pitchfork Media | (7.8/10) |
| Robert Christgau | (2-star Honorable Mention) |

Fuckin A is the second album by American band The Thermals, released on May 18, 2004, by Sub Pop Records.

A rare promo pressing exists of the planned (but later scrapped) "God and Country" single. It was meant to promote the live album Live @ the Echoplex: December 7th, 2007 and Fuckin A from four years prior. "Goddamn the Light" served as the single's b-side.

== Track listing ==
Source: Official Site

| No. | Title | Length |
|---|---|---|
| 1. | "Our Trip" | 1:54 |
| 2. | "Every Stitch" | 2:02 |
| 3. | "How We Know" | 3:18 |
| 4. | "When You're Thrown" | 1:42 |
| 5. | "Remember Today" | 2:53 |
| 6. | "A Stare Like Yours" | 2:47 |
| 7. | "Let Your Earth Quake, Baby" | 2:21 |
| 8. | "God and Country" | 2:15 |
| 9. | "End to Begin" | 2:47 |
| 10. | "Forward" | 2:11 |
| 11. | "Keep Time" | 2:45 |
| 12. | "Top of the Earth" | 0:59 |
| Total length: | | 27:54 |

== Personnel ==
=== The Thermals ===
- Hutch Harris - Guitar/Vocals
- Kathy Foster - Bass/Backing Vocals
- Jordan Hudson - Drums

=== Additional Personnel ===
- Ed Brooks - Mastering
- Rick Fisher - Mastering
- Troy Tietjen - Assistant Engineer
- Chris Walla - Engineer
