= Learn: The Songs of Phil Ochs =

Studio album by Kind of Like Spitting
- Released: September 6, 2005
- Recorded: 2005
- Genre: Folk
- Labels: Hush Records, DRA Records

Kind of Like Spitting chronology
Live in Seattle	Learn: The Songs of Phil Ochs	In the Red

Professional ratings
Review scores
Source	Rating
Pitchfork	(7.2/10) link

Learn: The Songs of Phil Ochs is a cover album by the band Kind of Like Spitting. The songs included were all written by the U.S. protest singer Phil Ochs. The CD booklet features Ben Barnett's studious commentary on the songs. It was released on September 6, 2005, on Hush Records.

== Track listing ==
1. "I'm Tired" – 2:03
2. "You Can't Get Stoned Enough" – 2:09
3. "Draft Dodger Rag" – 2:18
4. "That's What I Want to Hear" – 3:05
5. "Outside of a Small Circle of Friends" – 3:08
6. "Where Were You in Chicago" – 0:42
7. "When I'm Gone" – 3:50
8. "I Ain't Marching Anymore" – 2:38
9. "Remember Me" – 2:18
