= Kaitlyn ni Donovan =

American singer

- Origin: Portland, Oregon, United States
- Genres: Baroque pop Pop; Film score
- Occupations: Composer, singer-songwriter, musician
- Instruments: Violin; Vocals; Guitar; Viola; Mandolin; Ukulele; Piano; Dulcimer; Cello
- Years active: 1993–present
- Label: Hush
- Website: lastoftheexplorers.com

Kaitlyn ni Donovan is an American classically trained violinist and composer of experimental music, dream pop, and film scores, hailing from Portland, Oregon. She is self-taught on a multitude of instruments and is known for unorthodox chord changes and lyrics peppered with dense language and romantic imagery. She sings in a style that is angelic and sparse and is sometimes compared to Elizabeth Fraser of Cocteau Twins. In the mid-1990s she performed regularly with a large group of players under her own name. These performances included strings, toy pianos, acoustic and electric instruments. This sound would become known as chamber pop or baroque pop in the Northwest music scene.

In 1999, Hush Records released ni Donovan's Songs for Three Days. Produced by Tony Lash, Three Days and the compilation Flag would launch Hush toward national distribution.

In 2000, ni Donovan joined the shoegazing band, The High Violets.

In 2007, she and her partner, Jonathan Drews, opened a recording studio, named Last of the Explorers, where they focus on music and film score production.

== Releases ==
- 1999 Songs for 'Three Days (Hush Records)
- 1996 Dinner with Bosch (New Weave Records)
- 1993 Cannible Spirit (Cannible Music)

== Compilations ==
- Songs For Fairy Tales
- Ross Island Bridge "Volume 1: The Process Is Now The Work"
- Another Grey Christmas
- The Church of Northwest Music Volume 1
- NW Shoegazers Compilations 1, 2 and 3
- New Weave Records "Time Code"
- More A Hush Compilation
- Mass A Hush Compilation
- Flag A Hush Compilation
- Read: Interpreting Björk
- Mile: A Hush Compilation
- DECA: A Hush Compilation

== Guest musician recordings ==
- Boston Spaceships "Let It Beard"
- Class M Planets "5 Songs"
- Perhapst "Revise Your Maps"
- Boston Spaceships "Camera Found The Ray Gun"
- Boston Spaceships "Zero To 99"
- Loch Lomond "Night Bats"
- Ross Island Bridge "Volume 1: The Process Is Now The Work"
- Boston Spaceships "Planets Are Blasted"
- Blanket Music "Nice"
- Fancie "A Negative Capability"
- King Black Acid "Loves A Long Song"
- Loch Lomond "Paper The Walls"
- Monde la Bella "Exquisite Corpse"
- Oblivion Seekers "Snake Eyes"
- Parks and Recreation "What Was She Doing On The Shore That Night"
- thebrotheregg "Aortic Mor"
- The State Flowers "Third Of July"
- Sugarboom "The Liars Circus"

== The High Violets discography ==
- Dream Away EP (1999)
- 44 Down Reverb Records, (2002)
- To Where You Are Reverb Records, (2006)
- Satellite Remixes Reverb Records, (2007)
- Cinéma Comet Rock Records, (2010)
- Heroes and Halos Saint Marie Records, (2016)
