= The Boxtrolls (soundtrack) =

Soundtrack album by Dario Marianelli
- Released: September 23, 2014
- Recorded: 2014
- Genre: Film score
- Length: 60:02
- Label: Back Lot Music

Dario Marianelli chronology
Third Person (2013)	The Boxtrolls (2014)	Wild Card (2014)

The Boxtrolls (Original Motion Picture Soundtrack) is the soundtrack to the 2014 stop-motion animated fantasy comedy film The Boxtrolls, directed by Graham Annable and Anthony Stacchi for Laika. The film's original score is composed by Dario Marianelli and released through Back Lot Music on September 23, 2014.

== Development ==
Dario Marianelli composed the film score in his maiden scoring stint for an animated feature; though his inclusion revealed in December 2013, he was involved early in the production. Producer David Ichioka met Marianelli during a trip to London, and the duo discussed with Annable and Stacchi at a conversation, with Marianelli confirming his presence in the project. Stacchi opined on two sequences needed musical numbers to be developed at the earliest, before the animation: a waltz sequence which had to be choreographed live on sets before implementing the same in the animation, and another sequence had the eggs and the Boxtrolls built a record player which had a musical element and also to feature a performance. He eventually wrote and composed the themes during pre-production, with the latter was titled "Quattro Sabatino" named after Stacchi's son Sabatino.

The first cue he composed for the film was featured in the first teaser. Marianelli recorded the score at the Abbey Road Studios in London.

== Release ==
On August 30, 2014, it was announced that Back Lot Music would release a soundtrack album for the film on September 23, 2014. Few audio clips from the score was previewed on September 9, two weeks before the album's release. The album was issued in both digital and physical formats, and a vinyl edition was published by Mondo on April 7, 2015.

== Critical reception ==
James Southall of Movie Wave wrote "very solid, maybe not quite the sum of its parts but recommended all the same." Pete Simons of Synchrotones wrote "The Boxtrolls once again displays his talent, as well as his inventiveness where the orchestrations are concerned." Peter Debruge of Variety called Marianelli's orchestral score is sent into overdrive. Michael Gingold of Fangoria described it as "zither-tinged". Simon Brew of Den of Geek called it as "a strong score from Dario Marianelli". Daniel Schweiger of Assignment X wrote "Dario Marianelli tells us the box is worse than its bite with delectably sweet animated darkness". David Rooney of The Hollywood Reporter wrote "Dario Marianelli's robust score spells drama and action".

== Track listing ==
All music is composed by Dario Marianelli, except as noted.

The Boxtrolls (Original Motion Picture Soundtrack) track listing
No.	Title	Length
1.	"The Unspeakable Has Happened"	2:19
2.	"The Scavengers"	2:26
3.	"The Boxtrolls Cavern"	2:32
4.	"Eggs' Music Box"	1:50
5.	"Quattro Sabatino" (performed by Peter Harris, Alex Tsilogiannis, Thomas Kennedy & Edmund Saddington)	2:38
6.	"One Busy Night"	2:35
7.	"Rooftop Chase"	1:38
8.	"Broken Eggs"	2:00
9.	"Cheesebridge Funfair"	0:46
10.	"The Boxtrolls Song" (written by Eric Idle; performed by Sean Patrick Doyle, Mark Orton & Loch Lomond)	2:35
11.	"Snatcher and His Stooges"	1:34
12.	"Allergic"	4:51
13.	"To the Rescue"	1:59
14.	"I'm Sure I Am Delicious"	1:59
15.	"I Was Given to Them"	2:53
16.	"What's a Father?"	1:31
17.	"Slap Waltz"	2:28
18.	"Snatcher's Dramatical Entrance"	3:26
19.	"Look What You Did"	3:45
20.	"Jelly!"	4:11
21.	"Last Battle"	3:43
22.	"Say Cheese"	2:01
23.	"Little Boxes" (written by Malvina Reynolds, performed by Loch Lomond)	2:36
24.	"Some Kids" (written by Jessie Donaldson and Ritchie Young, performed by Loch Lomond)	3:03
25.	"Whole World" (performed by Loch Lomond)	1:34
Total length:		60:02

== Release history ==
Release dates and formats for The Boxtrolls (Original Motion Picture Soundtrack)
Region	Date	Format(s)	Label	Ref.
Various	September 23, 2014	Digital download; streaming; CD	Back Lot Music	
Various	April 7, 2015	Vinyl	Mondo	
