= Personal Life (album) =

Studio album by The Thermals
- Released: September 7, 2010
- Recorded: 2009/2010 at Jackpot!, Portland, Oregon
- Genre: Indie rock, punk rock
- Length: 32:12
- Label: Kill Rock Stars
- Producer: Chris Walla

The Thermals chronology
Now We Can See (2009)	Personal Life (2010)	Desperate Ground (2013)

Personal Life is the fifth album from the Portland-based indie rock band The Thermals. The album was released on September 7, 2010, on Kill Rock Stars. It is the first to feature drummer Westin Glass, who joined after the completion of 2009's Now We Can See and remained with the band until their 2018 dissolution.

As the album was recorded and mixed on analog tape, and mastered for vinyl without digital processes, the vinyl edition boasts a SPARS code of AAA.

The first single from the album to be released was "I Don't Believe You". The music video features Sleater-Kinney member Carrie Brownstein and Modest Mouse frontman Isaac Brock. "Never Listen to Me" and "Not Like Any Other Feeling" were the other singles.

== Reception ==
Professional ratings
Aggregate scores
Source	Rating
Metacritic	72/100
Review scores
Source	Rating
Allmusic	link
The A.V. Club	B link
Consequence of Sound	link
Mixtape Muse	link
One Thirty BPM	84% link
Pitchfork Media	6.7/10 link
Spin	link

Reviews of Personal Life represent a diverse mix of opinions on the album. The album holds a score of 72 out of 100 from Metacritic based on "generally favorable reviews".

The album debuted at No. 180 on the Billboard 200 albums chart on its first week in the United States. It also debuted at No. 30 on the Independent Albums, and No. 16 on the Tastemaker Albums charts.

== Track listing ==
All lyrics are written by Hutch Harris; all music is composed by Kathy Foster/Hutch Harris/Westin Glass.

No.	Title	Length
1.	"I'm Gonna Change Your Life"	2:59
2.	"I Don't Believe You"	2:38
3.	"Never Listen to Me"	4:30
4.	"Not Like Any Other Feeling"	3:34
5.	"Power Lies"	2:58
6.	"Only for You"	4:17
7.	"Alone, a Fool"	2:08
8.	"Your Love Is So Strong"	3:00
9.	"A Reflection"	2:37
10.	"You Changed My Life"	3:25

== Personnel ==
- Kathy Foster - bass, vocals, noise
- Hutch Harris - guitar, vocals
- Westin Glass - drums, vocals

== Charts ==
Chart (2010)	Peak position
US Billboard 200	180
US Heatseekers Albums (Billboard)	1
US Independent Albums (Billboard)	30
US Indie Store Album Sales (Billboard)	16
