= The Body, the Blood, the Machine =

Studio album by The Thermals
- Released: August 22, 2006
- Recorded: 2006
- Genre: Indie rock, post-punk revival
- Length: 35:47
- Label: Sub Pop
- Producer: Brendan Canty

The Thermals chronology
Fuckin A (2004)	The Body, the Blood, the Machine (2006)	Now We Can See (2009)

The Body, the Blood, the Machine is the third studio album by American indie rock band The Thermals. The album was released on August 22, 2006, on Sub Pop Records, and was produced by Fugazi's Brendan Canty. According to the band's official website, "the album tells the story of a young couple who must flee a United States governed by fascist faux-Christians."

== Reception ==
Professional ratings
Aggregate scores
Source	Rating
Metacritic	84/100
Review scores
Source	Rating
AllMusic	3.5/5 stars
The A.V. Club	A
The Boston Phoenix	3.5/4 stars
Consequence of Sound	4.5/5 stars
MSN Music (Consumer Guide)	A−
NME	8/10
Pitchfork	8.5/10
PopMatters	8/10
Spin	4/5 stars
Stylus Magazine	B

The music review online magazine Pitchfork placed The Body, the Blood, the Machine at number 186 on their list of top 200 albums of the 2000s.

== Track listing ==
All songs written and arranged by Hutch Harris and Kathy Foster.

No.	Title	Length
1.	"Here's Your Future"	2:28
2.	"I Might Need You to Kill"	2:27
3.	"An Ear for Baby"	3:36
4.	"A Pillar of Salt"	2:57
5.	"Returning to the Fold"	2:39
6.	"Test Pattern"	3:27
7.	"St. Rosa and the Swallows"	3:34
8.	"Back to the Sea"	4:47
9.	"Power Doesn't Run on Nothing"	5:14
10.	"I Hold the Sound"	4:38

== Credits ==
- Produced by Brendan Canty
- Recorded at Supernatural Sound, Oregon City, Oregon
- Assisted by Pete Tewes
- Mixed by Frank Marchand III at Waterford Digital, Baltimore, Maryland
- Mastered by Roger Seibel at SAE Mastering, Phoenix, Arizona
- Design by The Thermals with help from Dusty Summers
- Jesus painting by Jon Daly
