= Blanket Music =

American indie jazz rock band

- Origin: Portland, Oregon, United States
- Genres: Indie rock, jazz
- Years active: 2000–present
- Labels: Hush
- Members: Chad Crouch; Dave Depper; Mike Johnson; Greg Lind
- Past members: Jez Miller; Ross Seligman; Esperanza Spalding; Corrina Repp

Blanket Music is a jazz-influenced indie-rock band from Portland, Oregon. Led by Chad Crouch, the owner/operator of Hush Records.

== History ==
The band formed in 1999, to perform at a wedding reception. Mixing jazz, rock, bossa nova and pop music, the band released debut album Nice in 2000. In 2001 Corrina Repp and Esperanza Spalding joined the band on vocals, the band releasing second album Move the same year. Cultural Norms was released in 2004, featuring new member Mike Johnson and guest appearances from Chris Funk and Jenny Conlee of The Decemberists. It was described by Pitchfork Media writer Chris Dahlen as Crouch's "most compelling album". Their 2006 double-album The Love/Love Translation features a disc of Blanket Music originals plus a second disc of covers of songs originally be bands associated with Hush Records.

During their tenure, the band has released five pressed records, as well as free digital whole album download.

The band's track "Stand to Love" was used in the soundtrack to James Westby's 2008 film The Auteur.

The band were often compared to Belle & Sebastian, with Crouch's vocals often likened to Stuart Murdoch's.

== Members ==
- Chad Crouch - Vocals, Guitar, Keys, Programming
- Gregory Lind - Drums
- Jez Miller - Bass
- Ross Seligman - Guitar
- Dave Depper - Bass, Guitar, Vocals, Slide Guitar, 12 String Guitar, Keys
- Mike Johnson - Rhodes Piano, Piano, Vocals, Keys
- Corrina Repp - Vocals
- Esperanza Spalding - Vocals

== Discography ==
=== Albums ===
- Nice - (2000, Hush Records)
- Move (2002, Hush Records)
- Cultural Norms (2004, Hush Records)
- The Love/Love Translation (2006, Hush Records)

=== EPs ===
- Blanket Music/Noise for Pretend - Split EP (2001, Hush Records)
