= Zero to 99 =

Studio album by Boston Spaceships
- Released: October 6, 2009
- Recorded: Last Of The Explorers; Waterloo Studios
- Genre: Alternative rock, Indie, Lo-fi
- Label: Guided By Voices Inc.
- Producer: Chris Slusarenko, Jonathan Drews

Boston Spaceships chronology
| The Planets are Blasted (2009) | Zero to 99 (2009) | Our Cubehouse Still Rocks (2010) |

Professional ratings
Review scores
| Source | Rating |
|---|---|
| Pitchfork | (6.8|10) |
| Allmusic | 3.0/5 stars |

Zero to 99 is the third album by the Boston Spaceships, released in 2009.

== Track listing ==
All songs written by Robert Pollard.

Side A

1. Pluto The Skate - 1.17
2. How Wrong You Are - 2.27
3. Radical Amazement - 3.20
4. Found Obstruction Rock N' Rolls (We're The Ones Who Believe In Love) - 2.04
5. Question Girl All Right - 4.17
6. Let It Rest For A Little While - 2.23 (Featuring Peter Buck)
7. Trashed Aircraft Baby - 2.16
8. Psycho Is A Bad Boy - 1.38

Side B

1. Godless - 1.08
2. Meddle - 2.59
3. Go Inside - 2.44
4. Mr. Ghost Town - 1.52
5. Return To Your Ship - 1.36
6. Exploding Anthills - 2.11
7. The Comedian - 3.33
8. A Good Circuitry Soldier - 1.39

== Personnel ==
- Robert Pollard - vocals
- John Moen - drums, percussion
- Chris Slusarenko - guitar, bass, keyboards
