= Phylactery Factory =

Studio album by White Hinterland
- Released: March 2008
- Recorded: February 2007
- Genre: Indie pop
- Length: 48:57
- Label: Dead Oceans
- Producer: Adam Selzer

Professional ratings
Review scores
Source	Rating
Les Inrockuptibles	Favorable
Pitchfork	5.8/10 stars
PopMatters	7/10 stars
AllMusic	4/5 stars

Phylactery Factory is the second album by American singer-songwriter Casey Dienel, but the first under the White Hinterland name.

== Album release ==
The album, written by Dienel and produced by Adam Selzer, was released on March 4, 2008, from independent label Dead Oceans.

== Reception ==
The album received predominantly positive reviews. At Pitchfork, the album received a 5.8 rating out of 10, one of its few mixed reviews, with Stephen M. Deusner writing: "Phylactery Factory is a more ambitious, more professional, and more complicated record" than Dienel's first record, "with dark jazz-pop flourishes and compositions heavy with words. It is, however, not quite as rewarding." By contrast, leading French music magazine Les Inrockuptibles described the album as "the spirit of US songwriting in all its humble splendor"; like Deusner, Les InRocks critic Richard Robert described the project as "ambitious" but Robert found it "impeccably realized throughout the album, which, like Dienel's fluttering voice, breathes into every measure a fragrance of freshness rarely found in music with synthesizer." At AllMusic, Stewart Mason gave the album four of five stars, calling the album "a varied, endlessly listenable album" in which "the four-piece band is supplemented by perfectly deployed horns, strings, vibes, and other instruments (including, on 'Hung on a Thin Thread,' what sounds like a musical saw), giving the album a musical depth that matches perfectly with thoughtful songs like the heartbreaking the-war-at-home narrative 'Hometown Hooray' and the jaundiced, romantic ruminations of 'Dreaming of the Plum Trees.'"

Mason as well as Matthew Fiander reviewing at PopMatters noted the success of Phylactery Factory as a second album for Dienel. Fiander wrote: "Phylactery Factory, and the move to White Hinterland, is a huge step forward for Casey Dienel. As a 20-year-old singer a couple of years ago, she showed promise with her first record. Here, by making the move to full band at the right time, she has fulfilled a good deal of that promise much earlier than anyone expected. This is a confident, well-executed, endlessly beautiful record."

== Track listing ==
All songs written by Casey Dienel.

1. "The Destruction of the Art Deco House" – 5:57
2. "Dreaming of the Plum Trees" – 4:52
3. "Calliope" – 4:50
4. "Hometown Hooray" – 7:08
5. "Lindberghs + Metal Birds" – 3:44
6. "A Beast Washed Ashore" – 6:38
7. "Napoleon At Waterloo" – 3:14
8. "Hung On a Thin Thread" – 4:26
9. "Vessels" – 5:00
