= Let It Beard =

Studio album by Boston Spaceships
- Released: August 2, 2011
- Genre: Alternative rock, Indie, Lo-fi
- Label: Guided By Voices Inc.

Boston Spaceships chronology
Our Cubehouse Still Rocks (2010)	Let It Beard (2011)

Professional ratings
Aggregate scores
Source	Rating
Metacritic	(71|100)
Review scores
Source	Rating
Pitchfork	(6.0|10)
AllMusic	4.5/5 stars

Let It Beard is the fifth and final album by the Boston Spaceships, released on August 2, 2011. The album charted for one week on Billboard's Top Heatseekers chart at #42.

== Track listing ==
All songs written by Robert Pollard.

1. Blind 20-20 - 3.03
2. Juggernaut Vs. Monolith - 1.12
3. Tourist U.F.O. - 4.18
4. Minefield Searcher - 2.17
5. Make A Record For Lo-Life - 3.03
6. Let More Light Into The House - 5.10
7. You Just Can't Tell - 2.01
8. Chevy Marigold - 2.19
9. Earmarked For Collision - 3.45
10. Toppings Take The Cake - 1.09
11. Tabby And Lucy - 3.28
12. (I'll Make It) Strong For You - 1.56
13. A Hair In Every Square Inch Of The House - 4.46
14. The Ballad Of Bad Whiskey - 2.18
15. I Took On The London Guys - 2.40
16. Red Bodies - 2.53
17. A Dozen Blue Overcoats - 1.29
18. Pincushion - 1.15
19. Christmas Girl - 2.48
20. Let It Beard - 4.14
21. The Vice Lords - 3.27
22. German Field Of Shadows - 3.32
23. Speed Bumps - 2.16
24. No Steamboats - 2.38
25. You In My Prayer - 2.30
26. Inspiration Points - 5.24

=== Personnel ===
- Robert Pollard - vocals
- John Moen - drums, percussion
- Chris Slusarenko - guitar, bass, keyboards
