= Our Cubehouse Still Rocks =

Studio album by Boston Spaceships
- Released: 2010
- Genre: Alternative rock, Indie, Lo-fi
- Label: Guided By Voices Inc.

Boston Spaceships chronology
Zero to 99 (2009)	Our Cubehouse Still Rocks (2010)	Let It Beard (2011)

Professional ratings
Aggregate scores
Source	Rating
Metacritic	(78/100)
Review scores
Source	Rating
Pitchfork	(7.4/10)
Allmusic	4/5 stars

Our Cubehouse Still Rocks is the fourth album by the Boston Spaceships, released in 2010. The title refers to a passage from Finnegans Wake, the classic modernist novel by James Joyce. This album is the highest rated Boston Spaceships release on Metacritic, exceeding Let It Beard. This release is also the highest rating Robert Pollard project on the site, with his solo album, Lord Of The Birdcage, being his highest rating album in general.

== Track listing ==
All songs written by Robert Pollard.

Side A

1. Track Star - 3.08
2. John The Dwarf Wants To Become An Angel - 2.49
3. I See You Coming - 2.53
4. Fly Away (Terry Sez) - 2.46
5. Trick Of The Telekinetic Newlyweds - 2.36
6. Saints Don't Lie - 3.09
7. The British And The French - 1.45
8. Unshaven Bird - 2.28

Side B -

1. Come On Baby Grace - 2.34
2. Freedom Rings - 3.53
3. Stunted - 2.12
4. Bombadine - 2.07
5. Airwaves - 2.29
6. Dunkirk Is Frozen - 2.44
7. King Green Stamp - 1.53
8. In The Bathroom (Up 1/2 The Night) - 3.08

=== Personnel ===
- Robert Pollard - vocals
- John Moen - drums, percussion
- Chris Slusarenko - guitar, bass, keyboards
