= Wow & Flutter =

Indie rock band from Portland, Oregon

- Origin: Portland, Oregon, United States
- Genres: Indie rock
- Members: Cord Amato; Ryan Matheson; Jack Houston

Wow & Flutter is an indie rock trio from Portland, Oregon. Formed in 1997 by Cord Amato, the current line-up consists of Cord, Jack Houston and Ryan Matheson.

Wow & Flutter was one of several performers featured on the 2003's For Jonathan, a 2003 effort with indie filmmaker Chris Bennett. Other notable compilations the band has been involved with include 2000's Mute, and 2004's Preserve.

== Discography ==
- Guilty Pleasures, released on Amplified Recordings (1998)
- Pounding the Pavement, released on Jealous Butcher (2000)
- Better Today Then, released on Jealous Butcher (2001)
- In a Dark Room, released on Jealous Butcher (2001)
- Names, released on Jealous Butcher (2002)
- Golden Touch, released on Jealous Butcher (2008)
