= Bridges Worth Burning =

Studio album by Kind of Like Spitting
- Released: August 6, 2002
- Recorded: December 2001
- Genre: Emo
- Length: 39:56
- Label: Barsuk Records
- Producer: John Goodmanson

Kind of Like Spitting chronology
$100 Room (2000)	Bridges Worth Burning (2002)	Live in Seattle (2005)

Professional ratings
Review scores
Source	Rating
AllMusic	4.5/5 stars
Pitchfork	6.0/10

Bridges Worth Burning is an album by the band Kind of Like Spitting. It was released on August 6, 2002 on Barsuk Records.

Ben Gibbard of Death Cab for Cutie contributed drums, piano, and backing vocals on this album.

== Track listing ==
1. "Passionate" – 3:53
2. "We Are Both Writers" – 2:50
3. "Born Beautiful" – 2:19
4. "He Calls Me" – 3:48
5. "Following Days" – 1:49
6. "I Want Out" – 5:03
7. "Canaries" – 2:26
8. "Tyco Racing Set and a Christmas Story Fifteen Times" – 5:14
9. "This Lemonade Is Terrible" – 1:49
10. "Crossover Potential" – 2:59
11. "Continental" – 6:55
12. "Untitled" – 0:51

Album design by Ian Lynam.
