= More Parts per Million =

Studio album by The Thermals
- Released: March 4, 2003
- Recorded: 2003
- Genre: Indie rock, punk rock
- Length: 27:41
- Label: Sub Pop

The Thermals chronology
More Parts per Million (2003)	Fuckin A (2004)

Professional ratings
Aggregate scores
Source	Rating
Metacritic	77/100
Review scores
Source	Rating
AllMusic	4/5 stars
Pitchfork	7.5/10

More Parts per Million is The Thermals' debut studio album. The album was released in 2003 on Sub Pop Records. Only $60 was spent on the recording and therefore the record has a very lo-fi aesthetic not present on their later recordings. The album was recorded in "...Hutch Harris' s kitchen on a 4 track cassette," with every song being written and recorded solely by him. Most songs were written and recorded within a single day, as a sort of writing exercise, with some requiring additional time. After interest from Sub Pop mounted, Harris recruited Kathy Foster to the band, a former bandmate and writing partner from several previous musical endeavors. They became the sole consistent members of the band and would go on to write the future albums together.

== Track listing ==
No.	Title	Length
1.	"It's Trivia"	2:13
2.	"Brace and Break"	2:13
3.	"No Culture Icons"	2:21
4.	"Goddamn the Light"	1:57
5.	"Out of the Old And Thin"	2:43
6.	"I Know the Pattern"	2:36
7.	"Time to Lose"	2:23
8.	"My Little Machine"	2:01
9.	"Overgrown, Overblown!"	1:43
10.	"A Passing Feeling"	1:58
11.	"Back to Gray"	2:14
12.	"Born Dead"	1:43
13.	"An Endless Supply"	1:36
Total length:		27:41
