= Jeff London =

American folk musician and songwriter

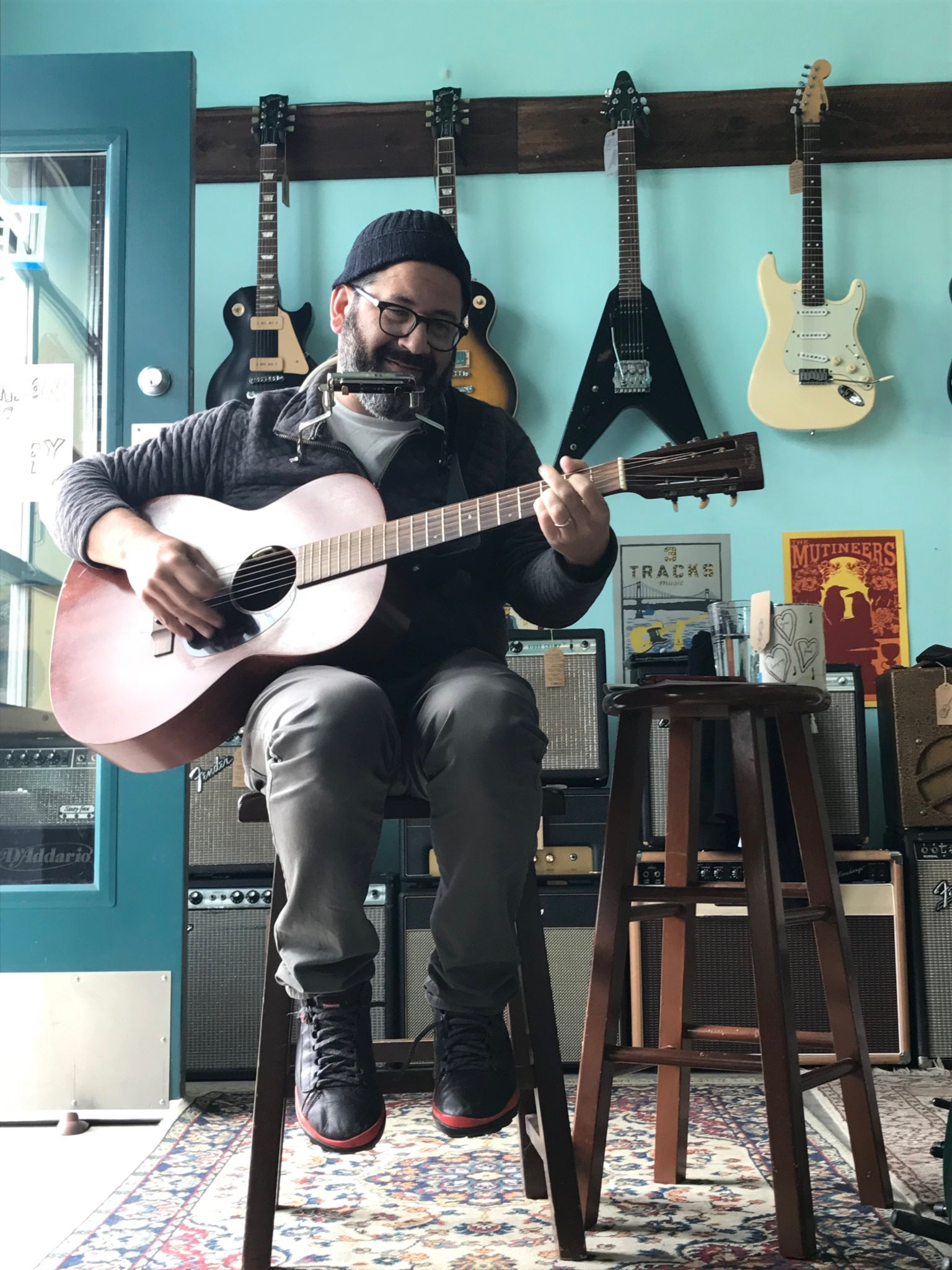
Jeff London at 3 Tracks Music in Portland, Oregon, June 10, 2017

Jeff London (born 1970), is an American musician and songwriter from Queens, New York. He was a part of the Portland indie-folk music scene of the mid-nineties, inspired by artists such as Elliott Smith and Pete Krebs, and sharing stages with M. Ward, Colin Meloy, Sara Dougher, Ben Gibbard, and Ben Barnett. His album and compilation recordings on HUSH records and Jealous Butcher records from 1997 to 1999 established the connection between the sound of Portland indie-folk and a broader Portland-based songwriter school. London is a vocalist who plays acoustic and electric guitar, piano, bass, and harmonica. He is notable for his lyricism.

== Early life and education ==
Jeff London was born in 1970 in Douglaston, Queens. In the early eighties at Camp B'nai B'rith Perlman Jeff discovered musical theater in productions of Pippen and Guys and Dolls. In 1987 Jeff landed an off-Broadway role as Eugene Morris Jerome in Brighton Beach Memoirs at the Studio Theatre in Lindenhurst. This production was reviewed in both the New York Times and Newsday. Newsday said “when you see Jeff London's Eugene you forget Matthew Broderick's ...” Jeff went to college at SUNY Binghamton where he began fronting bands and eventually writing songs reflective of the alternative culture of the early 90s.

== Music career ==
In 1992, Jeff formed Megrim with Jason Weiner in Binghamton, New York and recorded original, heavy indie music in the vein of Sebadoh, Dinosaur Jr., and Sonic Youth. In 1994 upon moving to the East Village Jeff played the singer-songwriter scene and recorded another set of songs that earned him local gigs at Sin-é and other clubs (including one he rescheduled missing a gig with the dishwasher, Jeff Buckley.) Just after the New Year in 1995, he drove across the country in a car with a hole in the floor to Portland, Oregon. He played the open mic scene there, eventually establishing his Hot Cocoa night at Meow Meow, where he met Ben Barnett and other Portland musicians. His first full-length came out on tape cassette on Jealous Butcher, Uneasy, and he made a name for himself in local publications. With Less, a four-artist collaboration on HUSH records, he began working with both Rob Jones and Chad Crouch of those labels, putting out Slowness (1999), which led to out-of-town shows in Seattle, San Francisco, and Chico, California. He then shared half of a split release on the Postparlo label with Kind of Like Spitting. London has also helped out with bass duties in Boy Crazy. His band lineup has included Rachel Blumberg, Chris Funk, Adam Selzer, Molly Hardy, Tove Holmberg, Dave Depper, Ben Barnett, and Tofer Towe.

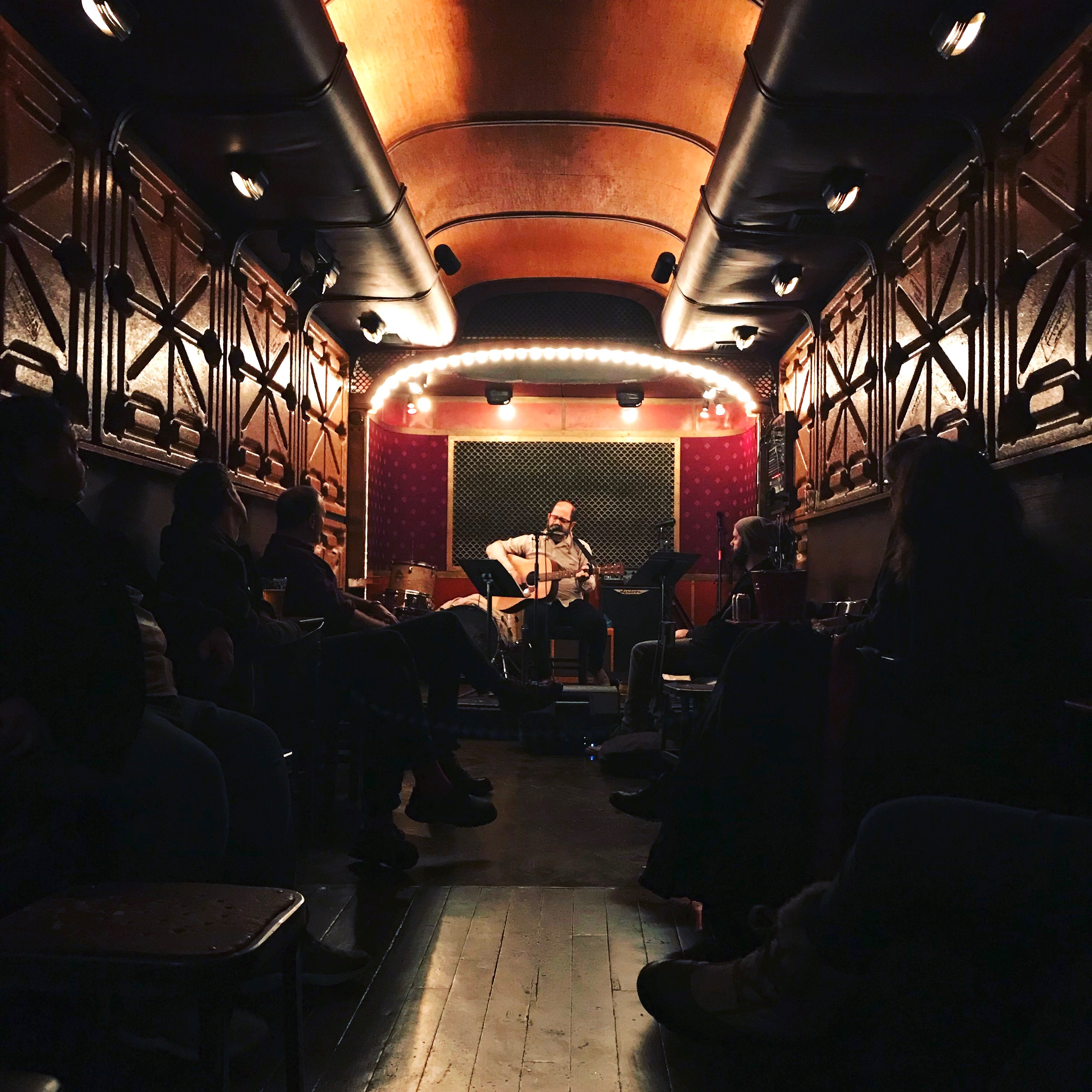
Jeff London@ Pete's Candy Store 2017

Col. Summers Park (2001) was the first to feature his rotating cast of friends and collaborators, and it was well received. Jeff earned entry into SXSW, NXNW, and the CMJ music festival in New York City. Upon his return to New York, Jeff released The Bane of Progress (2008) on HUSH and played live with Greg McMullen, Marla Hansen, Alec Mengee, Robin Ziari, and Andy Moon, followed by a string of shows in New York City and a record release in Portland, Oregon. He also appeared and played on In the Land of the Ice and Snow (2009), a compilation of Portland bands that supported Portland public schools. Jeff has played regularly at Pete's Candy Store in Brooklyn over the years and has recently completed the recording of Trouble Trust (2020), out in spring 2020.

== Discography ==
Albums

Uneasy (Cassette) Jealous Butcher Records JB-018 1997
Slowness (CD, Album) Hush Records HUSH14 2000
Col. Summers Park (CD, Album) Hush Records, Jealous Butcher Records HSH 027, JB-039 2001
Harm's Way (CD, Album) Schmata Records (Jeff London Self-released) JLP 001 2003
The Bane Of Progress (CD, Album) Hush Records HSH068 2007
Trouble Trust (Digital, Album) Jealous Butcher Records JB-193 2020

Singles & EPs

Kind Of Like Spitting / Jeff London - Home: Volume I(CD, EP, Ltd, Num)Post-Parlo Records PPR1001 2000
Jeff London And The Deep Clean - The Deep Clean EP (CDr, EP) Big Time Nobody Records BTN 001 1999

Compilations

From the Land of the Ice and Snow (Tangerine) Jealous Butcher Records JB-089. 2010
Are We Golden 1997-2007 (LP, Comp, Ltd, Num) Jealous Butcher Records JB-154 2017
