= The Operacycle =

American indie rock band

- Origin: Portland, Oregon, U.S.
- Genres: Alternative rock, indie rock, Experimental rock
- Years active: 1998–2002
- Label: Hush
- Past members: Jordan Hudson; Zak Riles; Victwa

Professional ratings
Review scores
Source	Rating
Allmusic	4/5 stars
Tiny Mix Tapes	4/5 stars

The Operacycle was an American indie rock band from Portland, Oregon. Initially formed as a solo project by multi-instrumentalist Jordan Hudson, the act's sole full-length album, Warmer, was released in 2000.

== Biography ==
Jordan Hudson and guitarist Zak Riles moved to San Francisco in the late 1990s from their home state of Florida. There, they met bassist Victwa and played one live show together before moving to Portland, Oregon. The 21-year-old Hudson composed the songs that would make up the album Warmer from his Portland home. The album, for which recording took over two years to complete, contains 13 songs and features 30 different "instruments" ranging from drums and guitars to household appliances to items such as door hinges and a tire iron.

Warmer was released in September 2000 on Hush Records. In a review of the album, Peter J. D'Angelo of Allmusic wrote: "This is one of those records that are special enough to avoid being pigeonholed. All types of songwriting are pulled off expertly, though the lack of vocals on some of the softer tracks does leave a slightly empty feeling." A Tiny Mix Tapes review stated: "It's refreshing [...] to hear experimental music that doesn't rely on distortion or minimalism to test the boundaries of song, but rather approaches the fledgling science with a foot in the classics." Julianne Shepherd of The Portland Mercury described the band's mostly-instrumental music as "dark" and "hypnotic", and said: "There's simply no need for vocals; their guitars sing a communicative melody, and their drums are acute, yet easy--subtly textured beats that balance technicality and danceability."

The Operacycle toured the United States during the autumn of 2000 and performed at the College Music Journal (CMJ) music festival in New York. In addition to Warmer, the group has appeared on various self-titled and split EPs. In early 2002, Hudson became the founding drummer for The Thermals, while Riles joined Grails as lead guitarist. In addition, both Hudson and Riles performed and recorded for many years with M. Ward.
