= Nothing Makes Sense Without It =

Album by Kind of Like Spitting

Studio album by Kind of Like Spitting
- Released: July 22, 2000
- Recorded: 2000
- Studio: Liberation Records
- Genre: Emo
- Length: 42:53
- Label: New American Dream
- Producer: Ben Barnett

Kind of Like Spitting chronology
Kind of Like Spitting (1999)	Nothing Makes Sense Without It (2000)	Old Moon in the Arms of the New (2000)

Professional ratings
Review scores
Source	Rating
AllMusic	2.5/5 stars
Pitchfork Media	6.5/10

Nothing Makes Sense Without It is an album by the band Kind of Like Spitting. It was released on July 22, 2000, on New American Dream Records. It was reissued on vinyl by Slowdance Records on October 30, 2001.

== Critical reception ==
PopMatters called the album an "early high-water mark." Seattle Weekly wrote that "[Singer Ben] Barnett basically scream-cries, but as terrible as that sounds, it comes off more like a courageous display of vulnerability than whining—as though he’s put his heart on a table in front of a ravenous pack of high-school bullies and ex-girlfriends."

== Track listing ==
1. "The Short Story Long" –3:13
2. "Blue Period" – 3:04
3. "At Your Convenience" – 4:30
4. "Birds of a Feather" – 3:30
5. "Robi Point, Stars Above" – 1:36
6. "Out of Harm's Way...Finally" – 5:39
7. "1330 Oak 1995" – 2:37
8. "Dodge Dart" – 2:55
9. "Haven't Been to the Ocean Sense" – 3:14
10. "Shuffle, Kick, Hum a Tune" – 4:04
11. "Shaggy Dog Shames Its Owner" – 5:53
12. "The Rest Is Up to You" – 2:38

Album illustration by Ian Lynam.
