= Baby (White Hinterland album) =

Studio album by White Hinterland
- Released: April 1, 2014
- Genres: Art pop, indie pop
- Length: 47:01
- Label: Dead Oceans
- Producers: Casey Dienel, Alexis Gideon

White Hinterland chronology
Kairos (2010)	Baby (2014)

Baby is the third studio album by American singer-songwriter Casey Dienel's act White Hinterland, released on April 1, 2014, through Dead Oceans.

Dienel made the ten-song album in a studio she developed in the basement of her childhood home in Scituate, Massachusetts.

== Critical reception ==
Professional ratings
Aggregate scores
Source	Rating
Metacritic	74/100
Review scores
Source	Rating
AllMusic	4/5 stars
NME	3.5/5 stars
Pitchfork	7.2/10
Rolling Stone	3.5/5 stars

Rolling Stone gave the album three and a half of five stars, noting the vocal range Dienel displays on the album, "singing in operatic quivers, howling yelps, haunting harmonic layers and even full-on vocal fry without showing any seams." NME also gave the album three and a half of five stars, saying Baby's sound took previous influences and created something "warm-blooded, rich and at ease with itself. Something that takes the bits of Mariah – ‘Emotions’, ‘Fantasy’ – that didn’t make you want to kill children and wraps them up in the indie tastes of post-Dirty Projectors America." The review criticized the absence of a hook in places, but said "These are quibbles, though, given how much Dienel seems to be pulling ahead of her overcrowded field." Reviewing the album in The Boston Globe, Marc Hirsch said, Baby "seems to construct itself as it goes, incrementally expanding from the bits and scraps of piano and multi-layered unaccompanied vocals of opener 'Wait Until Dark' and culminating in the rollicking, if skewed, roll of penultimate track 'Sickle No Sword.'"

== Track listing ==
All tracks are written by Casey Dienel.

No.	Title	Length
1.	"Wait until Dark"	4:31
2.	"Dry Mind"	2:04
3.	"Ring the Bell"	3:37
4.	"David"	5:41
5.	"Baby"	5:14
6.	"White Noise"	3:30
7.	"Metronome"	5:05
8.	"No Devotion"	4:57
9.	"Sickle No Sword"	5:39
10.	"Live with You"	4:29
