= Desperate Ground =

Studio album by The Thermals
- Released: April 15, 2013
- Recorded: 2012–2013
- Genre: Indie rock, lo-fi, alternative rock
- Length: 26:25
- Label: Saddle Creek Records
- Producer: John Agnello

The Thermals chronology
Personal Life (2010)	Desperate Ground (2013)	We Disappear (2016)

Desperate Ground is the sixth album from the Portland-based indie rock band The Thermals. The album was released on April 15, 2013, on Saddle Creek Records. It was produced by John Agnello (Dinosaur Jr, Sonic Youth) in Hoboken, New Jersey. Agnello and The Thermals completed the record and evacuated the studio just hours before Hurricane Sandy ravaged New Jersey.

The title came from The Art of War by Sun Tzu.

== Reception ==
Professional ratings
Aggregate scores
Source	Rating
Metacritic	73/100
Review scores
Source	Rating
AllMusic	4/5 stars
The A.V. Club	C
Consequence of Sound	C+
Exclaim!	8/10
Pitchfork	5.0/10

Reviews of Desperate Ground represent a diverse mix of opinions on the album. The album holds a score of 73 out of 100 from Metacritic, indicating "generally favorable reviews".

== Track listing ==
All lyrics are written by Hutch Harris; all music is composed by Kathy Foster/Hutch Harris/Westin Glass.

No.	Title	Length
1.	"Born to Kill"	1:48
2.	"You Will Be Free"	2:45
3.	"The Sunset"	2:51
4.	"I Go Alone"	3:12
5.	"The Sword by My Side"	3:10
6.	"You Will Find Me"	2:22
7.	"Faces Stay with Me"	2:32
8.	"The Howl of the Winds"	2:29
9.	"Where I Stand"	2:08
10.	"Our Love Survives"	3:08

== Personnel ==
- Kathy Foster – bass, vocals
- Hutch Harris – guitar, vocals
- Westin Glass – drums, vocals

== Chart performance ==
Chart (2013)	Peak position
US Heatseekers Albums (Billboard)	1
US Independent Albums (Billboard)	39
