= The Planets are Blasted =

Studio album by Boston Spaceships
- Released: 2009
- Genre: Alternative rock, Indie, Lo-fi
- Label: Guided By Voices Inc.

Boston Spaceships chronology
| Brown Submarine (2008) | The Planets are Blasted (2009) | Zero to 99 (2009) |

The Planets are Blasted is the second album by the Boston Spaceships, released in 2009.

== Track listing ==
All songs written by Robert Pollard.

Side A

1. Canned Food Demons - 2.08
2. Dorothy's A Planet - 2.21
3. Tattoo Mission - 2.44
4. Keep Me Down - 2.40
5. Big 'O' Gets An Earful - 3.14
6. Catherine From Mid-October - 1.44
7. Headache Revolution - 2.22

Side B

1. Sylph - 2.37
2. UFO Love Letters - 2.40
3. Lake Of Fire - 1.56
4. Queen Of Stormy Weather - 1.53
  Professional ratings
  Review scores
  | Source | Rating |
  |---|---|
  | Pitchfork | (7.5|10) |
  | Allmusic | 3.5/5 stars |
5. The Town That's After Me - 1.17
6. Sight On Sight - 4.06
7. Heavy Crown - 2.40

=== Personnel ===
- Robert Pollard - vocals
- John Moen - drums, percussion
- Chris Slusarenko - guitar, bass, keyboards
