= Brown Submarine =

Studio album by Boston Spaceships
- Released: 2008
- Genre: Alternative rock, Indie, Lo-fi
- Label: Guided By Voices Inc.

Boston Spaceships chronology
| Brown Submarine (2008) | The Planets Are Blasted (2009) |

Brown Submarine is the first album by the Boston Spaceships, released in 2008.

== Track listing ==
All songs written by Robert Pollard.

Side A

1. Winston's Atomic Bird – 1:48
2. Brown Submarine – 1:22
3. You Satisfy Me – 3:04
4. Ate It Twice – 1:56
5. Two Girl Area – 2:31
6. North 11 A.M, – 2:35
7. Zero Fix – 2:44

Side B

1. Psych Threat – 3:39
2. Andy Playboy – 1:30
3. Rat Trap – 2:22
4. Soggy Beavers – 1:34
5. Ready To Pop – 2:33
  Professional ratings
  Aggregate scores
  | Source | Rating |
  |---|---|
  | Metacritic | 75/100 |
  Review scores
  | Source | Rating |
  | Pitchfork | 7.1/10 |
  | Allmusic | 3.5/5 stars |
6. Still In Rome – 2:57
7. Go For The Exit – 2:23

=== Personnel ===
- Robert Pollard – vocals
- John Moen – drums
- Chris Slusarenko – guitar, bass, keyboards
- Brian Berg – percussion
- David Grant – trumpet on tracks B1 and B5
