= The Thrill of the Hunt =

Studio album by Kind of Like Spitting
- Released: February 14, 2006
- Genre: Emo
- Length: 30:55
- Label: Redder Records

Kind of Like Spitting chronology
In the Red (2005)	The Thrill of the Hunt (2006)

Professional ratings
Review scores
Source	Rating
AllMusic	3.5/5 stars

The Thrill of the Hunt is an album by the band Kind of Like Spitting. It was released on February 14, 2006 on Redder Records. The title track was written and sung by David Jerkovich. Ben Barnett is the primary singer and songwriter.

== Track listing ==
1. "Thrill of the Hunt" – 2:29
2. "Middle" – 2:52
3. "Hands" – 2:29
4. "Share the Road" – 1:16
5. "You (Bad Religion cover)" – 2:16
6. "If the Shoe Fits, Cut the Foot Off" – 2:59
7. "To the Wall (Intermission)" – 2:25
8. "Holding Patterns" – 3:35
9. "Song for You" (Leon Russell cover) – 2:30
10. "Thing About Distance (Redux)" – 1:38
11. "Lay Some Happiness on Me" (Dean Martin cover) – 1:44
12. "You Got Served" – 1:46
13. "Thirteen" (Big Star cover) – 2:47
