= Fraternity Life =

- Genre: Reality television
- Directed by: Brian Krinsky
- Opening theme: "Addicted" by Simple Plan
- Country of origin: United States
- Original language: English
- No. of seasons: 2
- No. of episodes: 26

Original release
- Network: MTV
- Release: February 26 – November 19, 2003

Related
- Sorority Life

Fraternity Life is a reality television series that aired on MTV from February 26, 2003 to November 19, 2003. The show consisted of college boys pledging to become part of a fraternity. The show was a spin-off of Sorority Life.

== First season ==
The first season occurred at the University at Buffalo. It followed college students pledging for the Sigma Chi Omega fraternity. The fraternity ended up getting in trouble for illegal hazing and breaking into the Buffalo Zoo. The fraternity has subsequently regained "on campus" status and is currently in "normal" standing with the university.

== Second season ==
The second season occurred at the University of California, Santa Cruz. It followed college students pledging the Delta Omega Chi fraternity. Once again, the show got in trouble with the university. Two frat brothers stole a koi named Midas from a pond on campus and barbecued it and ate it. This led to protests and eventually the revoking of the fraternity's charter by the university.

The second season was also notable for featuring the first openly gay person, Keldon Clegg, to appear on either the Fraternity Life or Sorority Life series.
