= Loch Lomond (band) =

American indie folk band

- Origin: Portland, Oregon, U.S.
- Genres: Chamber pop; indie rock; indie folk
- Years active: 2003–present
- Labels: Tender Loving Empire, Chemikal Underground, Hush Records, Song, by Toad Records
- Members: Ritchie Young; Jade Brings Plenty; Dave Depper; Jason Leonard; Brooke Parrott
- Past members: Johanna Kunin; Peter Broderick; Heather Broderick; Pia Da Silva; Amanda Lawrence; Laurel Simmons; Doug Jenkins; Trevino Brings Plenty; Scott Magee; Michael Young

Loch Lomond is an American indie folk band based in Portland, Oregon, founded as a solo recording project of Ritchie Young in 2003.

== History ==
Regarding the origins of the band name, Ritchie Young stated "I wanted to call the band The Mountains but there are tons of "mountains" bands. We ordered some reel-to-reel tape on eBay and it had a sticker on the box that said Loch Lomond. On the tape itself were old French nuns singing. We sampled that in our first record."

With help of engineer/producer Rob Oberdorfer, Young crafted the first Loch Lomond album, When We Were Mountains, with Ryan Cross and Kate O'Brien in 2004. Over the next few years, Loch Lomond performed around Portland, Oregon and the greater Pacific Northwest in various incarnations. Live performances would range from Young by himself to a full band. During this time, many different recording sessions took place in various studios and homes. These recordings were compiled on the early 2006 EP Lament For Children. In the later half of 2006, Loch Lomond solidified into a nine-person band. In this format, they produced their 2007 album "Paper the Walls", which was more reminiscent of traditional chamber folk music while featuring many non-traditional instruments. They toured with The Decemberists in late 2008. In 2010, Loch Lomond's song Wax and Wire was featured in the short film Danny MacAskill's Way Back Home produced by Red Bull Media House.

2011 saw the release of Little Me Will Start A Storm, on the Tender Loving Empire label. In 2012, the band released the White Dresses EP on the Chemikal Underground label.

Pens From Spain was released on September 2, 2016, on Hush Records.

== Discography ==
=== Albums ===
- When We Were Mountains, 2004
- Paper The Walls, Hush Records, 2007
- Little Me Will Start A Storm, Tender Loving Empire, 2011
- Dresses, Chemikal Underground, 2013
- Pens From Spain, Hush Records, 2016
- The Young, Hush Records, 2022

=== EPs ===
- Lament for Children EP, Hush Records, 2006
- Trumpets For Paper Children EP, 2009 (Released as free internet download)
- Night Bats EP, Hush Records, 2009
- White Dresses EP, Chemikal Underground 2012

=== Singles ===
- "A String", 2015
- "Blue Lead Fences", 2009
- "Wax and Wire", 2011

=== Soundtrack ===
- Little Boxes, The Boxtrolls, 2014
