= Sorority Life =

American reality television series

- Created by: Sergio Myers
- Opening theme: "You Get Me" by Michelle Branch
- Country of origin: United States
- No. of seasons: 3
- No. of episodes: 28

Production
- Executive producers: Sergio Myers; Catherine Finn
- Running time: 30 minutes

Original release
- Network: MTV
- Release: June 24, 2002 – November 19, 2003

Related
- Fraternity Life

Sorority Life was a reality television series on MTV that aired from June 24, 2002, to November 19, 2003. The show consisted of girls pledging to become part of a sorority.

== Production ==
The first season occurred at University of California, Davis. It followed 6 girls over 10 weeks as they pledged Sigma Alpha Epsilon Pi, a 4-year-old Jewish sorority that was relatively unknown on campus at the time.

The second season occurred at University at Buffalo. It followed 6 girls pledging for the Delta Xi Omega sorority.

The third season occurred at the University of Southern California. It followed girls pledging Zeta Sigma Phi, an independent multicultural sorority on campus founded in 1994.

== Reception ==
Sorority Life as a whole has been reviewed by Citynet Magazine, with the reviewer noting the differences between the reality of sororities and the image that MTV was projecting in the series. Citynet commented that MTV seemed "to think that bringing out the sorority stereotypes is going to boost ratings. Maybe they’re right, maybe not. Either way, I’m not overly impressed." The magazine also noted that sororities with similar names to those in the show were also receiving hate mail from viewers. Multiple sororities have come forward about the show, decrying the show's depiction of sorority life and politics.

== Spin-offs ==
Fraternity Life was a spin-off of Sorority Life that was filmed at fraternities at the same college as the sororities during the second and third season.
