= Kathy Foster (musician) =

American musician (active 1998– )

- Also known as: Roseblood
- Origin: Sunnyvale, CA, Portland, Oregon, U.S.
- Genres: Indie rock, punk rock, alternative rock
- Instruments: Bass, drums, vocals, guitar, keyboard
- Years active: 1992–present

Kathleen Michelle Foster is an American musician best known as the bassist for the indie rock band The Thermals and drummer for the All Girl Summer Fun Band. She also performed under the name Butterfly Transformation Service in the late 90's-early 2000's. She released a solo album under the name Roseblood in 2025, which features Janet Weiss on drums.

Foster was raised Catholic in Sunnyvale, California and moved to Portland, Oregon in May 1998. That summer, she joined with three friends to form the All Girl Summer Fun Band, which recorded and performed together until 2013; Foster and two other members reunited and returned to performing in 2023.

Foster moved to Portland with Hutch Harris, performing under the name Haelah at the time. She also performed as a drummer and vocalist in their group Urban Legends. Around 2000, they started to perform under the name Hutch and Kathy, leaving behind the names Haelah and Urban Legends. Lineups ranged from a duo to a quartet. The Thermals began in 2002 as Hutch's solo project. Shortly after he recorded what became the first album, More Parts Per Million, he formed a band, with Foster on bass guitar. By early 2003, The Thermals had started a career as a mainstay of the Portland indie rock scene. Foster continued to record and tour with the band until their 2018 dissolution. Foster also recorded drums on two of the band's seven albums, The Body, the Blood, the Machine (2006) and Now We Can See (2009).
