= Now We Can See =

Studio album by The Thermals
- Released: April 7, 2009
- Recorded: Supernatural Sound, Oregon City, Oregon in 2008
- Genre: Indie rock, punk rock
- Length: 34:32
- Label: Kill Rock Stars
- Producer: John Congleton

The Thermals chronology
The Body, The Blood, The Machine (2006)	Now We Can See (2009)	Personal Life (2010)

Now We Can See is the fourth album from the Portland-based indie rock band The Thermals. The album was released on April 7, 2009, on Kill Rock Stars, which is their first album since switching labels from Sub Pop Records. Lead singer Hutch Harris claimed the album hinges on a leitmotif of "songs from when we were alive".

The first single from the album was the title track, "Now We Can See". It premiered at Pitchfork Media on February 10, 2009.

"Now We Can See" was featured in the second-season finale of the NBC dramedy Chuck.

== Reception ==
Professional ratings
Aggregate scores
Source	Rating
AnyDecentMusic?	7.1/10
Metacritic	79/100
Review scores
Source	Rating
AllMusic	3/5 stars
Alternative Press	4.5/5 stars
The A.V. Club	A
Entertainment Weekly	B+
The Guardian	4/5 stars
NME	6/10
Pitchfork	7.8/10
Slant Magazine	4/5 stars
Spin	8/10
Uncut	4/5 stars

The album holds a score of 79 out of 100 from Metacritic based on "generally favorable reviews".

== Track listing ==
The official track-listing was revealed on their label, Kill Rock Stars' website:

All lyrics are written by Hutch Harris; all music is composed by Kathy Foster/Hutch Harris.

No.	Title	Length
1.	"When I Died"	3:21
2.	"We Were Sick"	2:44
3.	"I Let It Go"	3:35
4.	"Now We Can See"	3:30
5.	"At the Bottom of the Sea"	5:43
6.	"When We Were Alive"	1:45
7.	"I Called Out Your Name"	2:52
8.	"When I Was Afraid"	3:01
9.	"Liquid In, Liquid Out"	1:52
10.	"How We Fade"	3:26
11.	"You Dissolve"	2:43

iTunes Bonus Tracks
No.	Title	Length
12.	"When I Was Afraid" (Demo)	3:03
13.	"I Let It Go" (Demo)	3:37

== Personnel ==
- Kathy Foster - drums, bass, vocals, piano, noise
- Hutch Harris - guitar, vocals

== Charts ==
Chart (2009)	Peak position
US Billboard 200	191
US Heatseekers Albums (Billboard)	5
US Independent Albums (Billboard)	20
US Top Tastemaker Albums (Billboard)	10
