= Corrina Repp =

American musician and actress

- Origin: Portland, Oregon, United States
- Occupations: Singer, guitarist, songwriter
- Instrument: Guitar

Corrina Repp is a vocalist, guitarist, songwriter, and actress from Portland, Oregon, and now lives in Los Angeles. Her albums I Take On Your Days (2001) and It's Only the Future (2004) were released on Hush Records, while The Absent and the Distant (2006) and 'The Pattern of Electricity' (2015) were released on Mark Kozelek's personal label Caldo Verde. Her 2018 record, How A Fantasy Will Kill Us All, and ISLAND (2021) were released on Jealous Butcher records based in Portland, Oregon. Her earliest albums, A Boat Called Hope (1998) and The Other Side Is Mud (1999), are now out of print.

Repp was part of the now inactive quartet Tu Fawning from 2007 to 2012. Repp has appeared in episodes of Portlandia and Better Things.

== Album appearances ==
- Blanket Music/Noise for Pretend - Split EP (2001, Hush Records)
- Blanket Music - Move (2002, Hush Records)
- Modest Mouse- 'Lampshades on Fire'
