= Casey Dienel =

American singer-songwriter and musician

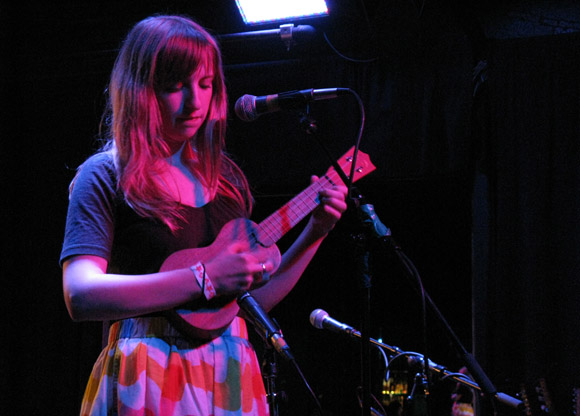

Background information
- Also known as: White Hinterland
- Born: March 10, 1985 (age 41)
- Origin: Scituate, Massachusetts
- Genres: Indie pop, dream pop, art pop
- Occupations: Singer-songwriter, musician, composer
- Years active: 1999–present
- Labels: Dead Oceans, Hush Records
- Website: whoiscaseydienel.com

Casey Dienel (born March 10, 1985) is an American singer-songwriter and musician. They released their debut album, Wind-Up Canary, in 2006 on Hush Records. Dienel has also performed and recorded as White Hinterland, whose first album, titled Phylactery Factory, was released on March 4, 2008, by the independent record label Dead Oceans. Dienel plays piano, keyboards and ukulele.

== Early life and education ==
Casey Dienel spent the bulk of their youth in Scituate, Massachusetts. They took their first piano lessons at age 4, and at age 14 began writing their own pop songs. While attending Scituate High School, Dienel formed a short-lived band.

After high school, Dienel moved to Boston to attend the New England Conservatory of Music, having turned down an offer of acceptance from Sarah Lawrence College. After one semester of studying classical vocals, they opted to switch their major to classical composition. Dienel studied with many notable musicians at the conservatory, including jazz vocalist Dominique Eade and composer Lee Hyla. While living in Boston during their conservatory years, Dienel met Dylan Metrano of the band Tiger Saw, and was an occasional member of the band's rotating lineup.

After two years at the conservatory, Dienel took an indefinite leave of absence to pursue their own music career.

== Early solo work ==
=== Wind-Up Canary ===
During the winter of 2005, Dienel was offered the chance to record for free at an abandoned caretaker's house on a farm in Leominster, Massachusetts. With some conservatory friends and a piano borrowed from the lobby of a local hotel, they recorded a number of their own songs without any intention of releasing them. Without Dienel's knowledge, a copy of these recordings made its way to Chad Crouch, the head of Hush Records, who contacted them about releasing an album. Dienel agreed and Hush released the recordings as Wind-Up Canary in March 2006 to widely favorable reviews.

=== Vessels ===
On November 29, 2006, Casey Dienel announced that they were working with producer Djim Reynolds on recording an EP titled Vessels, and that she hoped to release it in early 2007. Dienel had this to say about the project:

I've had my head shoved in the books for several weeks now, attempting to finish a little EP for your ears that I'm calling Vessels. I can't talk too much about it, for you know how fickle I am when it comes to these things, but hopefully in the new year it will find its way to your hands with ribbons and brass, etc. I can tell you that some sounds are sprawling and some are still quite intimate, and it features a few of my favorite friends with me.

To date, Vessels remains unreleased; however, there are live recordings and lyrics for the song available on the Internet.

== White Hinterland ==
=== Phylactery Factory ===
On January 4, 2008, after a few months hinting at "change," Dienel announced in their blog that "for the present and foreseeable future, there won’t be any more Casey Dienel." Their blog post coincided with Dead Oceans' announcement of the forthcoming release of White Hinterland's album Phylactery Factory:

2008 is here, and with the new year comes the influx of new albums. Dead Oceans is thrilled to partake in this ritual, and we are enthused to officially welcome White Hinterland to our label family. Led by the talented Casey Dienel, White Hinterland have crafted the mysterious Phylactery Factory, which will arrive in record stores worldwide on March 4, 2008.

=== Luniculaire ===
In 2009, White Hinterland released an EP called Luniculaire.

=== Kairos ===
On March 9, 2010, White Hinterland released its second full-length album, Kairos, via Dead Oceans. Pitchfork rated the album 7.5 on its 10-point scale, with reviewer Patrick Sisson writing that Dienel "swoons on 'Cataract' and 'Magnolias', two of the gorgeous tracks in which her sweet tone and confident phrasing, along with unfurled guitar melodies, recall Bitte Orca," the acclaimed 2009 album from the Dirty Projectors. Reviewing "Icarus", the first single off of Kairos, Brandon Stusoy noted the songs "hushed experimental threads" and said compared to previous work, Icarus "pushes things deeper and then recasts it in a denser electro realm."

White Hinterland released videos for Kairos songs "Amsterdam," "Begin Again," and "No Logic".

In 2010, White Hinterland toured the US and Europe with the album. A song from this album, "Icarus", was selected by Revlon to be used in their 2010 commercial for Just Bitten Lip Stain, starring Jessica Biel and directed by Kathryn Bigelow. Later the same year, "Icarus" was featured in an episode of the ABC Family drama "Pretty Little Liars," as well the fashion show of the winner of the Project Runway (season 8) finale, Gretchen Jones. The song was also used in the 2010 film It's Kind of a Funny Story.

=== Baby ===
White Hinterland released its third studio album Baby on April 1, 2014, through Dead Oceans. Dienel made the ten-song album in a home studio she developed in the basement of her childhood home in Scituate.

== Controversy ==
In May 2016, it was reported that Justin Bieber and Skrillex were being sued for copyright infringement by White Hinterland, who claims the duo used Dienel's vocal loop from their 2014 song "Ring the Bell" without permission in the song "Sorry". Eight seconds of the "Ring the Bell" riff is allegedly used six times in "Sorry." Co-writers are also included in the suit. Producer Skrillex responded to the claim by uploading a video of himself manipulating the vocals of co-writer Julia Michaels. The lawsuit was later dropped.

== Further solo work ==
=== Imitation of a Woman To Love ===
On May 18, 2017, Dienel released another album under their own name, entitled Imitation of a Woman To Love; Dienel served as the album's writer, singer, producer and engineer. They released two singles from the album: "High Times" (released April 12, 2017; Dienel played every and "Thrasher" (April 28, 2017). Writing for Rolling Stone, Maura Johnston called the album a "sprawling, stunning collection".

== Personal life ==
From 2008 Dienel lived in Portland, Oregon until they moved back to Scituate to make Baby. Until 2020, they lived in Brooklyn. Dienel is non-binary and autistic.

== Discography ==
=== As Casey Dienel ===
- Wind Up Canary (2006, Hush Records)
- Imitation of a Woman to Love (2017, Paddle Your Own Canoe Society)
- My Heart Is an Outlaw (2025, Jealous Butcher)

=== As White Hinterland ===
- Phylactery Factory (2008, Dead Oceans)
- Luniculaire EP (2008, Dead Oceans)
- Kairos (2010, Dead Oceans)
- Baby (2014, Dead Oceans)
