= Boston Spaceships =

American rock band

- Origin: Dayton, Ohio, U.S.
- Genres: Rock, punk, pop, lo-fi
- Years active: 2008–2011
- Labels: Guided By Voices, Inc.
- Members: Robert Pollard; Chris Slusarenko; John Moen
- Website: Official site

Boston Spaceships was a rock band featuring Robert Pollard and Chris Slusarenko of Guided By Voices, and John Moen of The Decemberists and Perhapst. The name of the band came from a nickname Pollard gave to the Boston cream donut from Krispy Kreme, which is Pollard's favorite donut. The band released several albums before disbanding in 2011 with their final album Let it Beard.

== History ==
=== Beginnings ===
In June 2008 Pollard announced he had formed a new recording project, Boston Spaceships. Pollard's confidence in the band led to a seventeen date fall tour that began in late September. For the band's sole set of live dates Pollard, Moen and Slusarenko were joined by longtime Pollard collaborators Tommy Keene and Jason Narducy.

The band's first album Brown Submarine was released in September and received good reviews, scoring the highest score for a Pollard release on Metacritic since GBV's Earthquake Glue five years prior. The album was named the 12th best album of 2008 by Magnet Magazine. The band released two 7 inch records, Headache Revolution and You Satisfy Me to round out the year.

=== 2009 ===
The band released their second album The Planets are Blasted in February 2009. The album featured guest appearances by Greg Demos (GBV 1990–99), Gary Jarman (The Cribs) and Chris Funk (The Decemberists).

The band released their third album Zero to 99 in October 2009. Magnet Magazine called it the eighth best album of 2009 and The Big Takeover's Tim Bugbee called Zero to 99 the 5th best album of 2009. In late 2009 they released their first live album Licking Stamps And Drinking Shitty Coffee – Boston Spaceships Live in Atlanta from the band's show of October 17, 2008.

=== 2010 ===
Boston Spaceships released an EP, Camera Found The Ray-Gun in March 2010. Their fourth LP, Our Cubehouse Still Rocks, was released in September 2010.

=== 2011 ===
The band released their fifth and final album, the double LP Let It Beard, on August 2, 2011. The album features guest spots from J Mascis (Dinosaur Jr.), Colin Newman (Wire), Steve Wynn (Dream Syndicate), Mick Collins (The Dirtbombs), Dave Rick (Phantom Tollbooth), and Mitch Mitchell (Guided by Voices).

== Discography ==
=== Albums ===
- 2008 – Brown Submarine (Guided By Voices Inc.)
- 2009 – The Planets are Blasted (Guided By Voices Inc.)
- 2009 – Zero to 99 (Guided By Voices Inc.)
- 2010 – Our Cubehouse Still Rocks (Guided By Voices Inc.)
- 2011 – Let It Beard (Guided By Voices Inc.)
- 2012 – Out of the Universe by Sundown: The Greatest Hits of Boston Spaceships (Fire Records)

=== Singles and EPs ===
- 2008 – Headache Revolution (7" – Happy Jack Rock Records)
- 2008 – You Satisfy Me (7" – Happy Jack Rock Records)
- 2010 – Camera Found The Ray-Gun (EP – Jackpot Records)

=== Live ===
- 2009 – Licking Stamps And Drinking Shitty Coffee – Boston Spaceships Live in Atlanta
