= Kind of Like Spitting =

American indie rock band

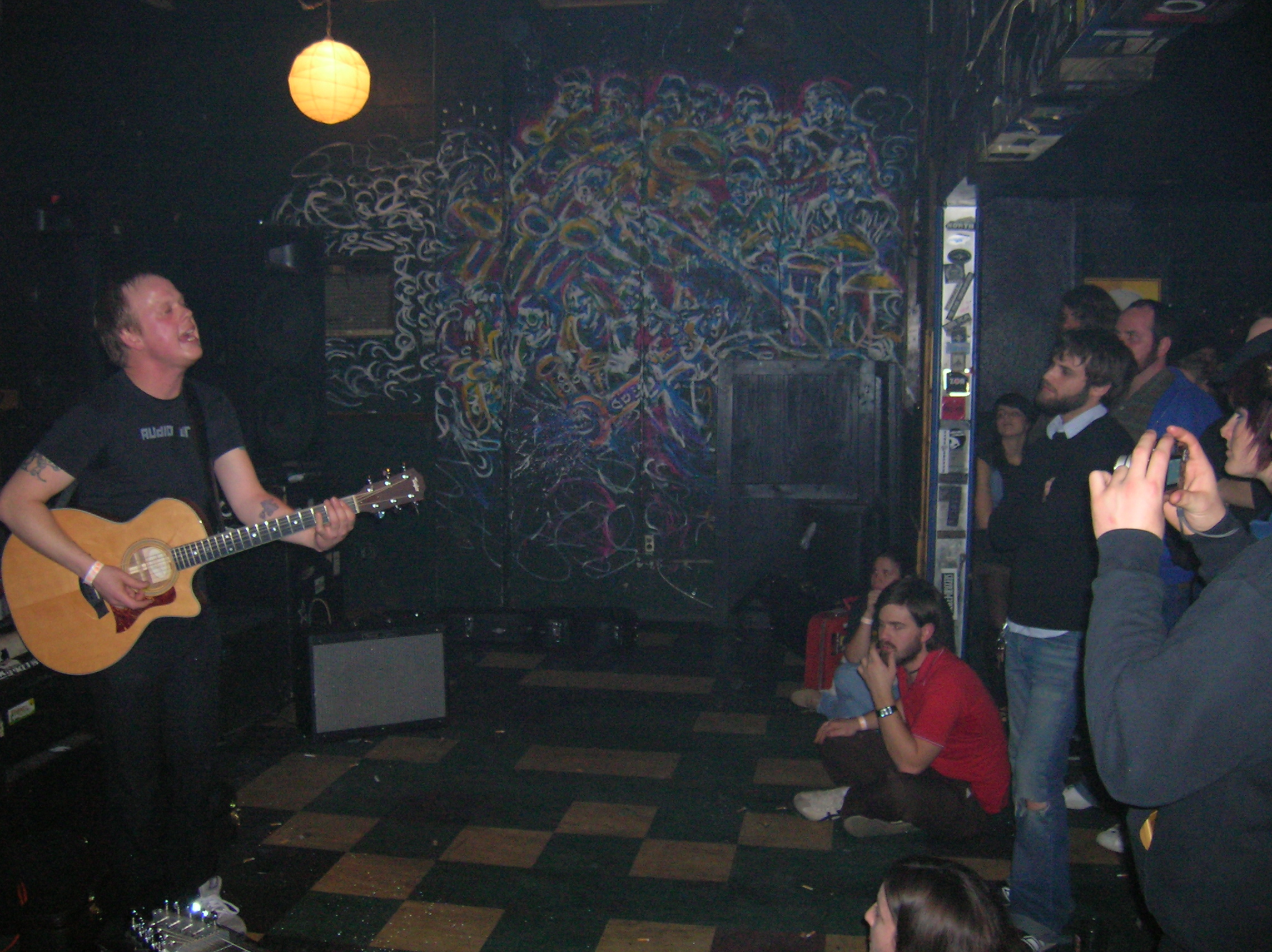
- Ben Barnett playing at Will's Pub, Orlando, Florida, January 2006

Background information
- Origin: Portland, Oregon, United States
- Genres: Indie rock, indie emo, emo
- Years active: 1996–2006, 2012–2025
- Labels: Count Your Lucky Stars Records; Topshelf; Jealous Butcher; Hush; New American Dream; Ohev/Ganaarecordings; Barsuk; Redder; A QUIET PLACE TO SLEEP
- Past members: Ben Barnett; Brian Grant; Dante Johnson; Anthony Sanders; Ryan Moore; Ryan Matheson; Ben Gibbard; P.J. Aylward; Dan DeVriend; David Jerkovich

Kind of Like Spitting is an American indie rock band. They formed in 1996 in Portland, Oregon. The band was led by singer-songwriter Ben Barnett, whose work has drawn comparisons to Elliott Smith, Mark Eitzel, Billy Bragg, and Robert Pollard.

Over the next decade, Kind of Like Spitting regularly toured in the US, sometimes with David Jerkovich of Novi Split or a backing band. Kind of Like Spitting released twelve albums in seven years. In the UK, the track "Birds of a Feather" was picked up and played by BBC Radio 1 DJ John Peel; however, it never received regular airplay. The band announced a break-up in 2006 for personal reasons. After reuniting in 2012, the band broke up again in 2025.

== History ==
In July 1998, the band released a self-titled EP through Hush Records. In April 2000 You Secretly Want Me Dead was released.

Barnett has been involved in other musical projects, including The Thermals in 2002–2003. Since 2007, Barnett has taught music at the Paul Green School of Rock in Seattle. Barnett was also part of the band Blunt Mechanic, which released the album World Record in 2010.

In 2014, Kind of Like Spitting reunited again but as a trio with Brian Grant on bass guitar and Dante Johnson on drums. In this lineup the band recorded their Topshelf Records debut, It's Always Nice To See You and embarked on a two-week-long tour with Lemuria.

On November 8, 2024, Barnett released a new EP as Kind of Like Spitting, via Near Mint Records. The three-song Soon was the first official release for the band in a decade.

On September 17, 2025, following allegations of grooming and sexual assault by Febuary vocalist/guitarist Rila Ogawa, Barnett released a statement announcing the end of the band. He stated that their album I Do It For My City, released on October 3, 2025, would be their last. He later issued a statement denying the allegations against him.

== Discography ==
Studio albums

- Kind of Like Spitting (cassette) - Jealous Butcher Records (1996)
- You Secretly Want Me Dead – Jealous Butcher Records (1997) / Hush Records (2000) / Jealous Butcher Records Record Store Day re-release (2016)
- Kind of Like Spitting – Hush Records (1999)
- Nothing Makes Sense Without It – New American Dream (2000)
- Old Moon in the Arms of the New – Hush Records (2000)
- One Hundred Dollar Room – Ohev/Ganaarecordings (2002)
- Bridges Worth Burning – Barsuk (2002)
- Learn: The Songs of Phil Ochs – Hush Records (2005)
- In the Red – Hush Records (2005)
- Myspace Covers - self-released (2005)
- The Thrill of the Hunt – Redder Records (2006)
- Songs About Zombies and Trust Issues - self-released (2009)
- One Hundred Dollar Room (Reissue) - Count Your Lucky Stars Records (2013)
- It's Always Nice to See You - Topshelf Records (2015)
- Covers - self-released (2016)
- Learn 2: The Songs Of The Karl Hendricks Trio - self-released (2020)
- I DO IT FOR MY CITY - self-released (2025)

EPs

- Kind of Like Spitting (The Blue EP) – Hush Records (1998)
- Insound Tour Support Series No. 14 - Insound Records (2000)
- Your Living Room's All Over Me – Art of the Underground (2006)

Singles

- Birds of a Feather 7" – Grand Theft Autumn Records (1999)
- AMERICAN TUNE – A QUIET PLACE TO SLEEP (2026)

Live

- Live At CPOP Art Gallery - self-released (2002)
- Live & Acoustic At Fireside Bowl - self-released (2002)
- Live At The Electric Factory - self-released (2002)
- Live At Le Jive Music Café - self-released (2003)
- Live In Seattle - Hush Records (2005)
- Phoning It In - self-released (2005)
- Live In Woodland Hills - self-released (2006)
- Portland Lounge Series VIII - self-released (2007)
- Daytrotter - Daytrotter (2015)

Splits

- Tour CD - with The City On Film and Sterling Silver - Jealous Butcher Records / About Midnight Records / Slowdance Records (1998)
- Kind of Like Spitting / Rose of Sharon - Jealous Butcher Records (1998)
- City On Film / Kind of Like Spitting - Sport Records (1999)
- Home: Volume I - with Jeff London - Post-Parlo Records (2000)
- Your Livingrooms All Over Me - Lemuria / Kind of Like Spitting - Art Of The Underground (2006)
- Tour CD - with Des Ark and David Rovics (2016)

Compilation Appearances

- Nailed to the Stars - Jealous Butcher Records (1996)
- FLAG - Hush Records (1999)
- Slightest Indication Of Change - Slowdance Records (2001)
- Read: Interpreting Björk - Hush Records (2004)
- MILE - Hush Records (2005)
- Another Grey Christmas - LocalCut (2007)
- Metaphysics for Beginners - Redder Records (2007)
- DECA - Hush Records (2009)
- From the Land of Ice and Snow: The Songs of Led Zeppelin - Jealous Butcher Records (2010)
- Not The Same Old Songs: A Tribute To Motown - Artistic Integrity Records (2016)
