= The Auteur =

- Directed by: James Westby
- Cinematography: Alan Jacobsen
- Release date: April 25, 2008 (Tribeca Film Festival)
- Country: United States
- Language: English

The Auteur is a 2008 American independent mockumentary directed and written by James Westby.

The film premiered at the 2008 Tribeca Film Festival.

== Cast ==
- Melik Malkasian as Arturo Domingo
- Denise Chanterelle DuBois as Margaret le Plage
- Loren Hoskins as Manny Davis
- John Breen as Frank E. Normo
- Cara Seymour as Doris
- Ron Jeremy as himself
