= The Thermals =

American indie rock band

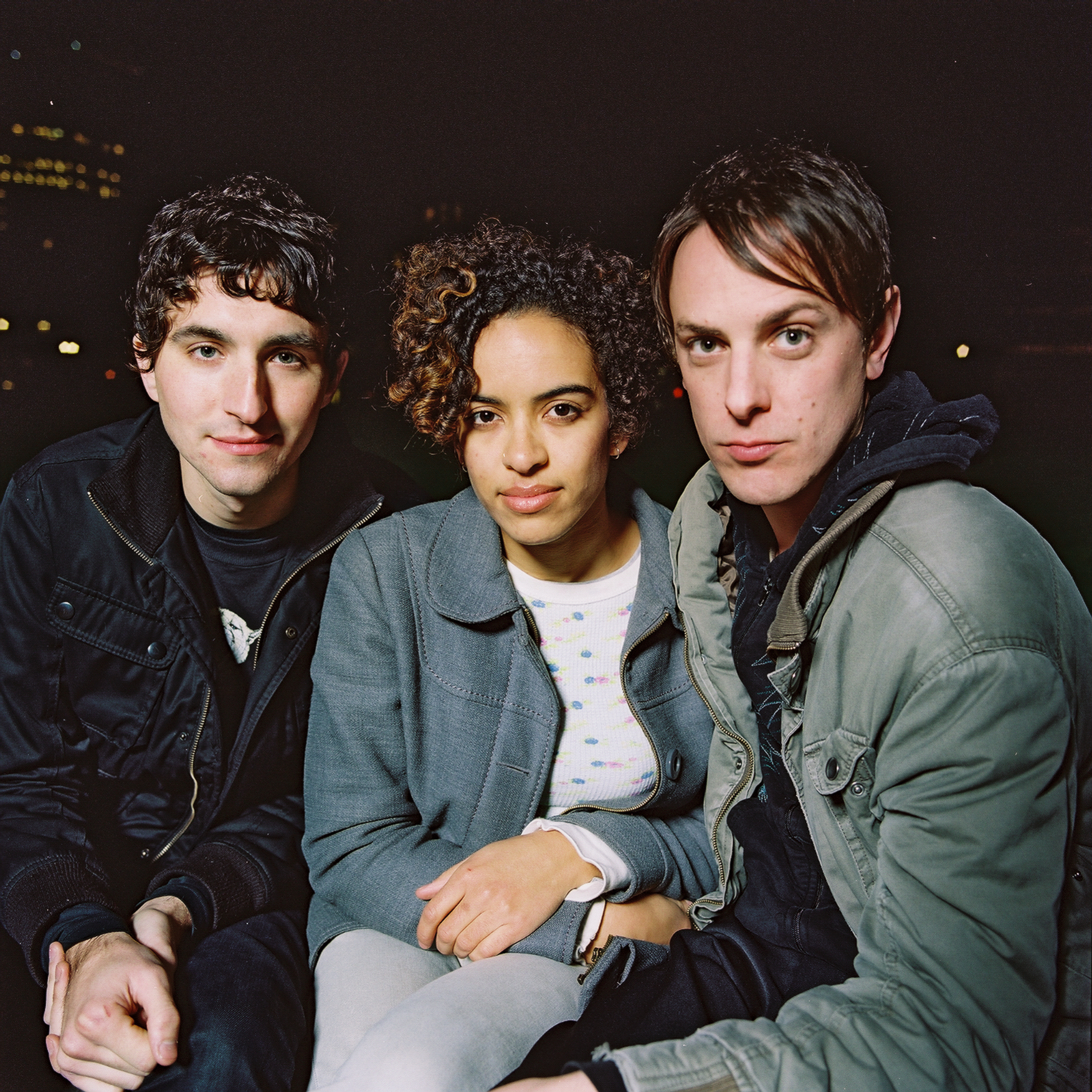
- The Thermals final line-up (left to right): Westin Glass, Kathy Foster and Hutch Harris

Background information
- Origin: Portland, Oregon, United States
- Genres: Indie rock, lo-fi, punk rock
- Years active: 2002–2018, 2025–present
- Labels: Kill Rock Stars, Saddle Creek, Sub Pop
- Members: Hutch Harris
- Past members: Kathy Foster; Westin Glass; Jordan Hudson; Ben Barnett; Caitlin Love; Lorin Coleman; Joel Burrows
- Website: thethermals.com

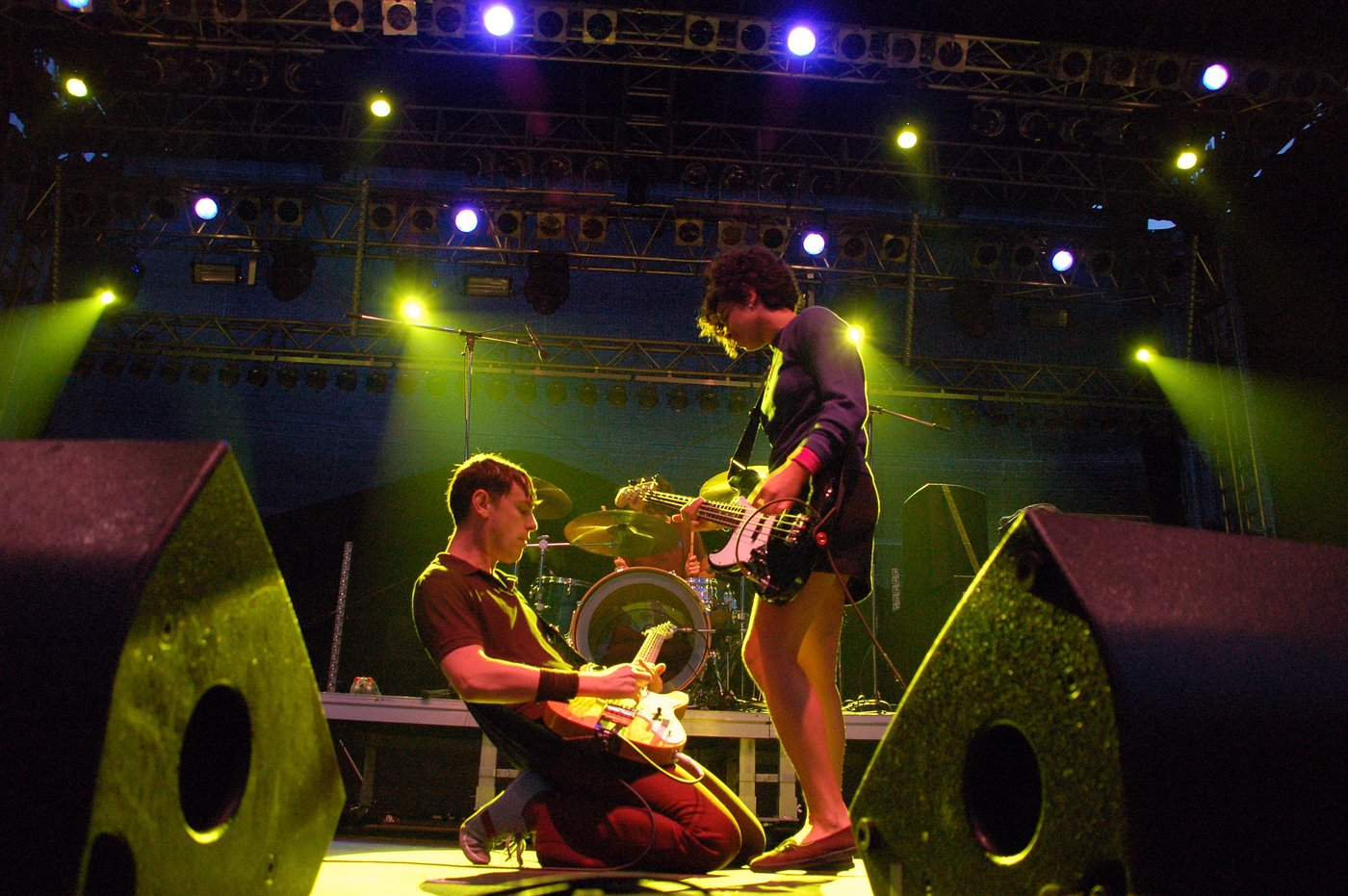
The Thermals in 2009 at a rock festival in Germany

The Thermals are an American indie rock band based in Portland, Oregon, United States. The group was formed in 2002. With influences heavily rooted in both lofi, as well as standard rock, the band's songs were also known for their political and religious imagery.

== History ==
In 2002 former bandmates Hutch Harris and Kathy Foster came together to form the Thermals, having previously worked together, most notably in the folk duo Hutch & Kathy. Their first album, More Parts per Million, was released in 2003 by Sub Pop Records. The album was recorded and performed entirely by Hutch Harris, who played every instrument. The first live lineup was Harris with Kathy Foster on bass, Jordan Hudson (also of M. Ward and The Operacycle) on drums and Ben Barnett on guitar.

Their follow-up album, 2004's Fuckin A, was mixed by Death Cab For Cutie member Chris Walla. During that period Ben Barnett left the band and Hutch Harris took over the role as guitarist.

Their third album The Body, The Blood, The Machine was produced by Brendan Canty of Fugazi and won the group much recognition and acclaim, appearing on multiple top album lists for 2006 such as NPR, The AV Club and Pitchfork. The song "A Pillar of Salt" was also featured on EA's Skate 3 soundtrack. Jordan Hudson dropped out of the band during the recording of their third album. Kathy Foster took over percussion duties in the recording studio, which Lorin Coleman performed on tour.

The Thermals' fourth album Now We Can See, was released in 2009 on the label Kill Rock Stars and produced by John Congleton. Again, Foster worked as the percussionist on the album. Westin Glass joined the group as a drummer after the album had been completed.

The Thermals fifth album, Personal Life was released September 7, 2010.

The Thermals' cover of the song "Little Boxes" was used as the opening song for Weeds season 8 episode 8, "Five Miles From Yetzer Hara" which aired on August 19, 2012; their song "Here's Your Future" from The Body, The Blood, The Machine having been previously used in the second episode of the third season ("A Pool and his Money" August 20, 2007).

In October 2012, former guitarist Joel Burrows died from complications from a car accident.

On January 31, 2013, The Thermals signed to Saddle Creek Records and planned to release their new album Desperate Ground on April 16, 2013. In March 2013, The Thermals were named one of Fuse TV's 30 must-see artists at SXSW.

On January 6, 2016, The Thermals announced the release of their seventh studio album titled We Disappear. It was released on March 25, 2016 via Saddle Creek records.

On April 9, 2018, the band announced that they were officially disbanding after 16 years.

In December 2025, The Thermals returned as a Hutch Harris solo act with a new single "In the Night Sky".

On June 23, 2026, the band's eighth album, titled Under Crushing Rain, was announced alongside the release of a new single, "Spirit Collectors".

== Band members ==
=== Current lineup ===
- Hutch Harris – vocals, guitar, keyboards (2002–2018, 2025-present)

=== Former members ===
- Jordan Hudson – drums (2002–2005)
- Ben Barnett – guitar (2002–2003)
- Caitlin Love – drums (2006)
- Lorin Coleman – drums (2007–2008)
- Joel Burrows – guitar (2007; died 2012)
- Kathy Foster – bass, vocals (2002–2018)
- Westin Glass – drums, vocals (2008–2018)

== Discography ==
=== Studio albums ===
Title	Album details	Peak chart positions		
Title	Album details	US	US Heat	US Indie
More Parts per Million	Released: March 4, 2003; Label: Sub Pop	—	—	—
Fuckin A	Released: May 18, 2004; Label: Sub Pop	—	—	—
The Body, the Blood, the Machine	Released: August 22, 2006; Label: Sub Pop	—	—	—
Now We Can See	Released: April 7, 2009; Label: Kill Rock Stars	191	5	20
Personal Life	Released: September 7, 2010; Label: Kill Rock Stars	180	1	30
Desperate Ground	Released: April 13, 2013; Label: Saddle Creek	—	1	39
We Disappear	Released: March 25, 2016; Label: Saddle Creek	—	11	36
Under Crushing Rain	Released: September 4, 2026; Label: self released	—	-	-
"—" denotes album that did not chart or was not released

=== EPs ===
Title	EP details
No Culture Icons	Released: January 21, 2003; Label: Sub Pop
A Pillar of Salt	Released: June 19, 2007; Label: Sub Pop
Desperate Ground Demos	Released: April 23, 2013; Label: Saddle Creek

=== Singles ===
==== As lead artist ====
Title	Year	Peak chart positions		Album
Title	Year	UK Sales	UK Indie	Album
"How We Know"	2004	—	—	Fuckin A
"A Pillar of Salt"	2007	—	34	The Body, the Blood, the Machine
"Returning to the Fold"	2008	—	—	The Body, the Blood, the Machine
"Now We Can See"	2009	—	—	Now We Can See
"We Were Sick"	2009	—	—	Now We Can See
"Canada"	2010	—	—	Non-album single
"I Don't Believe You"	2010	—	—	Personal Life
"Never Listen To Me"	2010	84	—	Personal Life
"Not Like Any Other Feeling"	2011	—	—	Personal Life
"Born To Kill"	2013	—	—	Desperate Ground
"Hey You"	2016	—	—	We Disappear
"My Heart Went Cold"	2016	—	—	We Disappear
"In The Night Sky"	2025	—	—	Non-album single
"I Will Be Delivered"	2026	—	—	Under Crushing Rain
"Spirit Collectors"	2026	—	—	Under Crushing Rain
"—" denotes a recording that did not chart or was not released in that territory.

==== Split singles ====
Title	Year	Other artist(s)	Album
"Ballad of Big Nothing" / "Division Day"	2006	We Are Telephone	To Elliott, from Portland
"When I Died" / "Cool Yourself You Are Flush Red"	2009	Thao & The Get Down Stay Down	Non-album singles
"Separate" / "So Hot Now"	2010	The Cribs	Non-album singles

=== Live albums ===
Year	Title	Label
2007	Insound Tour Support 2.0	Insound
2008	LIVE at the Echoplex - December 7, 2007	Kufala Recordings

=== Compilations ===
Year	Title	Label
2003	The Wonder of the Underground Pressed On Plastic, Vol. 1	Meow Meow
2004	Sub Pop: Patient Zero	Sub Pop
2006	To Elliott: From Portland	Expunged Records
2006	Terminal Sales Vol. 2: This Delicious	Sub Pop
2007	Bridging the Distance: a Portland, OR covers compilation	Arena Rock Recording Co.
