= Hush Records =

Hush Records is a Portland, Oregon based record label founded by Chad Crouch.

== Background ==
Crouch, frontman of the band Blanket Music, organized Hush Records in 1997, when he self-released a solo record called Portland, Or. The following year, Crouch bought a CD burner and began recording and distributing music by Mike Johnson (Reclinerland), Jeff London, and Ben Barnett (Kind of Like Spitting) to record stores locally. It wasn't until the 1999 releases of Kaitlyn Ni Donovan's Songs for Three Days and a compilation called Flag that Hush had a national distributor.

== 50th release ==
The label continues to release several records a year, recently having reached its 50th release milestone with the appropriately titled 50-track compilation Mile.

== Artists and releases ==
In June, 2009, Loch Lomond released their Trumpets for Paper Children EP through Hush Records. Tracks on the EP were sourced from two previous albums, Lament For Children released in 2006 and Paper The Walls which was released in 2007. A converted church in Portland called "The Funky Church" was the site where two new videos of the band, "Elephants and Little Girls" and "Witchy" were recorded by label founder Chad Crouch. Hosannas' were a group that caught the attention of Hush Records. Impressed by their sound, Hush signed them up and released a CD, Then & Now & Then in 2010.

== Hush artists (past and present) ==
- Peter Broderick
- Blanket Music
- Bobby Birdman
- Casey Dienel
- Dat'r
- The Decemberists
- Graves
- Jeff London
- Kind of Like Spitting
- Kaitlyn Ni Donovan
- Laura Gibson
- Loch Lomond
- Miki Howard
- Norfolk & Western
- Novi Split
- The Operacycle
- Corrina Repp
- Esperanza Spalding
- Velella Velella

== See also ==
- List of record labels
