= Hutch Harris =

American songwriter and musician

- Born: October 5, 1975 (age 50)
- Origin: Portland, Oregon, US
- Genres: Indie rock, punk rock, alternative rock
- Instruments: Guitar, vocals
- Labels: Saddle Creek Records, Kill Rock Stars, Sub Pop

Hutch Harris (born October 5, 1975) is an American songwriter and musician, and is the lead guitarist/vocalist of Portland, Oregon rock band The Thermals. He also writes and performs under the name Forbidden Friends. More recently, he has performed with Clear Rivers.

== Early life ==
Hutch Harris was born in New York City on October 5, 1975. His family moved to San Jose, California in 1983. Harris met Kathy Foster after graduating from Prospect High School in 1993. Harris and Foster played in the bands Haelah, Hutch & Kathy, and Urban Legends before moving to Portland in 1998 and forming The Thermals in 2002.

== Musical career ==
Harris wrote and recorded the first Thermals record, More Parts per Million, in the kitchen of his one-bedroom house in Southeast Portland in early 2002. Sub Pop Records heard the recording via Ben Gibbard of Death Cab For Cutie and The Postal Service, and signed The Thermals to a three-record contract when the band was less than six months old. The Thermals released 7 studio albums between 2003 and 2016 before announcing their split in 2018.

In 2011 Harris released two 7" singles on the Kill Rock Stars label under the name Forbidden Friends.

Harris released his debut solo album Only Water in 2018. This was followed by Old Lost Days in 2020 which was a compilation of early songs from 1996 to 2002.

== Personal life ==
Hutch Harris lives in Portland, Oregon.
