= Box (Guided by Voices album) =

Box set by Guided by Voices
- Released: February 28, 1995
- Recorded: October 1986–1993
- Genre: Rock, lo-fi, indie rock
- Label: Scat Records

Guided by Voices chronology
Bee Thousand (1994)	Box (1995)	Alien Lanes (1995)

Guided by Voices chronology
Box (1995)	Suitcase: Failed Experiments and Trashed Aircraft (2000)

Professional ratings
Review scores
Source	Rating
Allmusic	3.5/5 stars

Box is the first box set by indie rock band Guided by Voices. The set was released in 1995 on CD and vinyl. It collects their first four limited-release albums Devil Between My Toes, Sandbox, Self Inflicted Aerial Nostalgia and Same Place the Fly Got Smashed, as well as an LP of previously unavailable material, King Shit and the Golden Boys.

The vinyl edition also includes Propeller – this was excluded from the CD version as the album was already available on that format, having been included on the first CD edition of Vampire on Titus.

== Track list ==
=== Devil Between My Toes (Disc 1) ===
1. Old Battery
2. Discussing Wallace Chambers
3. Cyclops
4. Crux
5. A Portrait Destroyed By Fire
6. 3 Year Old Man
7. Dog's Out
8. A Proud And Booming Industry
9. Hank's Little Fingers
10. Artboat
11. Hey Hey, Spaceman
12. The Tumblers
13. Bread Alone
14. Captain's Dead

=== Sandbox (Disc 2) ===
1. Lips Of Steel
2. A Visit To The Creep Doctor
3. Everyday
4. Barricade
5. Get To Know The Ropes
6. Can't Stop
7. The Drinking Jim Crow
8. Trap Soul Door
9. Common Rebels
10. Long Distance Man
11. I Certainly Hope Not
12. Adverse Wind

=== Self-Inflicted Aerial Nostalgia (Disc 3) ===
1. The Future Is In Eggs
2. The Great Blake Street Canoe Race
3. Slopes Of Big Ugly
4. Paper Girl
5. Navigating Flood Regions
6. An Earful O' Wax
7. White Whale
8. Trampoline
9. Short On Posters
10. Chief Barrel Belly
11. Dying To Try This
12. The Qualifying Remainder
13. Liar's Tale
14. Radio Show (Trust The Wizard)

=== Same Place The Fly Got Smashed (Disc 4) ===
1. Airshow '88
2. Order For The New Slave Trade
3. The Hard Way
4. Drinker's Peace
5. Mammoth Cave
6. When She Turns 50
7. Club Molluska
8. Pendulum
9. Ambergris
10. Local Mix-Up
11. Murder Charge
12. Starboy
13. Blatant Doom Trip
14. How Loft I Am?

=== Propeller (Disc 5)-Vinyl Only ===
1. Over The Neptune / Mesh Gear Fox
2. Weed King
3. Particular Damaged
4. Quality Of Armor
5. Metal Mothers
6. Lethargy
7. Unleashed! The Large-Hearted Boy
8. Red Gas Circle
9. Exit Flagger
10. 14 Cheerleader Coldfront
11. Back To Saturn X Radio Report
12. Ergo Space Pig
13. Circus World
14. Some Drilling Implied
15. On The Tundra

=== King Shit And The Golden Boys (Disc 6) ===
1. We've Got Airplanes
2. Dust Devil
3. Squirmish Frontal Room
4. Tricyclic Looper
5. Crutch Came Slinking
6. Fantasy Creeps
7. Sopor Joe
8. Crunch Pillow
9. Indian Was An Angel
10. Don't Stop Now
11. Bite
12. Greenface
13. Deathtrot And Warlock Riding A Rooster
14. 2nd Moves To Twin
15. At Odds With Dr. Genesis
16. Please Freeze Me
17. Scissors
18. Postal Blowfish
19. Crocker's Favorite Song
