= Devil Between My Toes =

Studio album by Guided by Voices
- Released: February 15, 1987
- Recorded: October 1986 – February 1987
- Studio: Steve Wilbur's home studio (Dayton, Ohio)
- Genres: Post-punk; jangle pop; alternative rock
- Length: 31:13
- Label: Ə
- Producer: Robert Pollard

Guided by Voices chronology
Devil Between My Toes (1987)	Sandbox (1987)

Professional ratings
Review scores
Source	Rating
AllMusic	2.5/5 stars

Devil Between My Toes is the debut studio album by American indie rock band Guided by Voices.

== Background ==
After consistently receiving lukewarm reception from Dayton locals and poor sales of their first release, 1986's Forever Since Breakfast, GbV had stopped playing live and dedicated themselves to be a studio band only.

This would be the first of multiple GbV releases (until Vampire on Titus) produced by Steve Wilbur in his 8-track studio. With the exception of "Crux", "3 Year Old Man", "A Proud And Booming Industry", "Artboat", and "Bread Alone", which were recorded in R. Pollard's basement, all songs were recorded with Wilbur. The album was self-financed and only 300 original pressings were released.

The cover art was initially supposed to be a painting done by a high school friend of Pollard's depicting a "colonial-era cockfight" that would be redone to include “bikers and businessmen and shit”, but when the friend could not be located, the band instead used an image of Pollard's rooster, Big Daddy, that then-bassist and later-guitarist Mitch Mitchell took through a chain link fence. "Big Daddy" was later referenced in the song "Don't Stop Now", off of 1995's King Shit and the Golden Boys, with a studio version appearing in 1996's Under the Bushes Under the Stars.

Several of the songs would be re-issued on the 1993 European GbV compilation "An Earful 'o Wax", and then the whole record would be re-issued later in 1995 on Scat Records as a part of the Box compilation. Scat Records reissued it again in 2021.

== Music and lyrics ==
Devil Between My Toes has been described as post-punk. In an article for HHVmag, writer Bjorn Bischoff stated, "Influences of R.E.M. and post-punk can be heard, but also the charming touch of Guided By Voices itself. While in "A Portrait Destroyed by Fire" the guitar intones a swan song, "Discussing Wallace Chambers" delivers much more light-hearted tones that anticipate part of the band's future sound.

The song "Hank's Little Fingers" is about a friend of Pollard's, who had a birth defect on his right hand and played guitar.

== Track listing ==
All tracks are written by Robert Pollard except where noted.

No.	Title	Writer(s)	Length
1.	"Old Battery"		1:46
2.	"Discussing Wallace Chambers"		1:48
3.	"Cyclops"		1:50
4.	"Crux"	R. Pollard, Jim Pollard, Mitch Mitchell	2:24
5.	"A Portrait Destroyed by Fire"	R. Pollard, Mitchell	5:09
6.	"3 Year Old Man"	R. Pollard, J. Pollard	1:39
7.	"Dog's Out"		2:09
8.	"A Proud and Booming Industry"	R. Pollard, J. Pollard, Mitchell	1:03
9.	"Hank's Little Fingers"		2:13
10.	"Artboat"		2:27
11.	"Hey Hey, Spaceman"		2:51
12.	"The Tumblers"		2:39
13.	"Bread Alone"	R. Pollard, J. Pollard	1:09
14.	"Captain's Dead"		2:00

== Personnel ==
=== Guided by Voices ===
- Robert Pollard – guitar, vocals
- Kevin Fennell – drums
- Peyton Eric – drums on "A Portrait Destroyed By Fire", "A Proud And Booming Industry", and "Captain's Dead"
- Steve Wilbur – guitar on "Hey Hey, Spaceman"
- Mitch Mitchell – bass guitar
- Tobin Sprout – guitar and backing vocals on "A Portrait Destroyed By Fire"

=== Technical ===
- Donnie Kraft – mastering
- Steve Wilbur – engineering
