= My Dad Is Dead =

American rock musical project

- Origin: Cleveland, Ohio, U.S.
- Genres: Post-punk, indie rock, college rock
- Years active: 1984–2011
- Labels: Scat, Homestead, Emperor Jones, St. Valentine, Unhinged, Vital Cog
- Past members: Mark Edwards; Jeff Curtis; John McEntire; Chris Burgess; Scott Pickering; Tim Gilbride; Matt Swanson; Shayne Ivy; Scott Lasch
- Website: www.mydadisdead.com

My Dad Is Dead was a recording project of musician Mark Edwards. The project began in Cleveland, Ohio in 1984. My Dad Is Dead released twelve full-length albums before it officially ended in 2011. A new group called Secular Joy was formed later that year in Chapel Hill, North Carolina.

== History ==
Mark Edwards first played drums during the very early portion of the 1980s, performing in the bands Thermos of Happiness and Riot Architecture before they both dissolved by 1984. In August that same year, Edwards began to learn guitar and started to write music under the name of My Dad Is Dead. Early live shows consisted of him performing guitar and vocals with percussion duties done by a drum machine. Edwards’ name for his project was a nod to both of his parents having died by the time he was 24 years old.

After the independent release of My Dad Is Dead's self-titled cassette album in 1985, Edwards released ...and He's Not Gonna Take It Anymore through local label St. Valentine in 1986. A second LP, Peace, Love and Murder came out a year later on Birth Records before Edwards signed to Homestead Records in early 1988 for the release of three more albums: The Best Defense, Let's Skip The Details, and The Taller You Are, the Shorter You Get.

Let's Skip The Details was the first release by the project to feature musicians other than Edwards, the addition of whom enabled My Dad Is Dead to tour as a full band. In 1990, the group toured Europe and recorded a session for the John Peel Show on BBC Radio 1. Later that year, MDID released the Shine double seven-inch, a collection of four previously unreleased songs and four earlier tunes re-recorded with a full band line-up; it was released via Scat Records, which later became the band’s new label after MDID’s contract with Homestead ended. The Chopping Down the Family Tree LP, and Out of Sight, Out of Mind LP were released in 1991 and 1993, respectively.

1995 saw the split Emperor Jones/Trance Syndicate release For Richer, for Poorer, and also the My Dad Is Dead entry in the Hello Recording Club subscription EP series. Emperor Jones also released Everyone Wants the Honey But Not the Sting in 1997. In late 1997, following a short tour, Edwards announced the end of the band on its website. In 2002, Vital Cog issued The Engine of Commerce. A Divided House and A New Clear Route were issued independently on Edwards' self-run Unhinged imprint in 2005 and 2009, and, in 2011, the project officially came to an end.

== Discography ==
=== Albums ===
- My Dad Is Dead (Self-released, 1985)
- ...and He's Not Gonna Take It Anymore (St. Valentine, 1986)
- Peace, Love and Murder (Birth, 1987)
- Let's Skip the Details (Homestead Records, 1988)
- The Taller You Are, the Shorter You Get (Homestead Records, 1989)
- Chopping Down the Family Tree (Scat Records, 1991)
- Out of Sight, Out of Mind (Scat Records, 1993)
- For Richer, for Poorer (Emperor Jones/Trance Syndicate, 1995)
- Everyone Wants the Honey But Not the Sting (Emperor Jones, 1997)
- The Engine of Commerce (Vital Cog, 2002)
- A Divided House (Unhinged, 2005)
- A New Clear Route (Unhinged, 2009)

=== EPs ===
- Shine 2×7″ (Scat Records, 1990)
- My Dad Is Dead, also known as the Hello EP (Hello Recording Club, 1995)

=== Compilations ===
- The Best Defense (Homestead Records, 1988)
- Shine(r) (Emperor Jones/Trance Syndicate, 1996)

=== Compilation appearances ===
- "Time Has Come Today", from Human Music (Homestead Records, 1989)
- "Old Toys or A Boat", from split 7-inch with Prisonshake (Scat Records, 1990)
- "Flesh Colored House", from split 7-inch with Bastro (Clawfist, 1990)
- "Time and Again", from Hotel Cleveland Vol III (Scat Records, 1991)
- "Where's Our Reason", from split 7-inch with Rastro! (Simple Machines, 1993), later compiled on Working Holiday! CD (Simple Machines, 2004)
- "Second Thoughts" and "Nothing Special", from Cle Magazine CD (1995)
- "Mysterious Ways", from Cleveland Squawks CD, included in Cle Magazine (1997)
- "Just Pretending", from Pet Sounds Volume 1 (Vital Cog, 2000)
- "The Memory of Your Kiss", from split 7-inch with Duochrome (Vital Cog, 2001)

== Secular Joy ==
In January 2012 Edwards’ new recording project, Secular Joy, released their debut album, Made for Better Things. The project began in Chapel Hill, North Carolina. The Loneliest Smile followed in 2014.
