= Propeller (Guided by Voices album) =

- Cover artwork from Propeller #127. Left to right: Mitch Mitchell, Robert Pollard, Jim Pollard.

Studio album by Guided by Voices
- Released: February 14, 1992
- Recorded: 1991–1992
- Genre: Indie rock
- Length: 36:07
- Labels: Rockathon Records; Old Age / New Age
- Producers: Robert Pollard; Mike "Rep" Hummel

Guided by Voices chronology
Same Place the Fly Got Smashed (1990)	Propeller (1992)	Vampire on Titus (1993)

One of the original handmade covers, used in the 2005 re-release

Propeller is the fifth album by American indie rock band Guided by Voices.

== Background ==
Conceived initially by Robert Pollard as a farewell album in the face of years of obscurity and mounting debt, the album ended up earning the band a higher-profile status and influence, affording a lasting position in the indie rock canon.

While significant portions were recorded in a professional recording studio (though later to be reworked to a more lo-fi sound Mike "Rep" Hummel, of Mike Rep and the Quotas), the album is notable for being the first of the band's albums to make extensive use of 4-track cassette and lo-fi recording techniques as a distinct aesthetic. Songs are frequently punctuated by unexpected blasts of noise, awkward tape edits, sped-up or slowed-down vocal or instrumental parts, and other sonic bric-a-brac.

== Lyrics and music ==
The first song on the album, "Over the Neptune/Mesh Gear Fox" is one of GBV's longest songs with a runtime of 5:41.

The eleventh song on Propeller "Back to Saturn X Radio Report" is a collage of songs that Guided by Voices had recorded at the point of the release of the album. Most of the songs were originally going to appear on an album called Back to Saturn X that was scrapped in favor of Propeller . All of them were later released. They are (in order):

- "Buzzards and Dreadful Crows (Different Version)" (an alternate take of a track later released on Bee Thousand; this version appears on Suitcase: Failed Experiments and Trashed Aircraft)
- "Sopor Joe" (released on King Shit and the Golden Boys as part of the GBV box set Box)
- "Fantasy Creeps" (also on King Shit and the Golden Boys)
- "Back to Saturn X" (released on Hardcore UFOs: Revelations, Epiphanies and Fast Food in the Western Hemisphere box set)
- "Mr. Japan" (released on Suitcase: Failed Experiments and Trashed Aircraft)
- "Chicken Blows" (released on Alien Lanes)
- "Damn Good, Mr. Jam" (also on Static Airplane Jive)
- The "off and onward" clip that follows this has not been heard anywhere else.
- "Tractor Rape Chain (Clean It Up)" (original, and very different, version of "Tractor Rape Chain," which would later appear in a redone form on Bee Thousand. This version has only appeared on the Darla 100 - Sixth Year Anniversary Compilation CD)
- "Damn Good, Mr. Jam" reprise.

== Artwork ==
The cover art also contributed to the album's legend. Initially self-released only in a limited vinyl run of 500, each copy of the album received a unique, handmade cover. Decorated by band members, friends and family with myriad methods such as screen-printing, hand-painting, and affixing various found objects (including an empty six-pack carton of Natural Light) to plain white sleeves, these albums grew in value over the years and as of 2005, were known to have sold for prices in the thousands of dollars. The album was first given a wide release by Scat Records when it was appended to the CD version of GBV's 1993 album Vampire on Titus. Later, both albums were given standalone CD releases.

In 2005, a new, non-limited and non-handmade vinyl edition was released, along with an updated CD version using a reproduction of a selection the original covers.

A gallery of original Propeller covers can be seen at the Guided by Voices database.

== Reception ==
Professional ratings
Review scores
Source	Rating
AllMusic	3/5 stars
Pitchfork Media	9.2/10

Propeller was released to critical acclaim.

== Track listing ==
All tracks are written by Robert Pollard except where noted.

No.	Title	Writer(s)	Length
1.	"Over the Neptune / Mesh Gear Fox"		5:41
2.	"Weed King"		2:39
3.	"Particular Damaged"	Dan Toohey, Tobin Sprout, R. Pollard	1:59
4.	"Quality of Armor"		2:37
5.	"Metal Mothers"		3:18
6.	"Lethargy"	Jim Pollard, Mitch Mitchell, R. Pollard, Sprout	1:20
7.	"Unleashed! The Large-Hearted Boy"	J. Pollard, Mitchell, R. Pollard, Sprout	1:59
8.	"Red Gas Circle"	Toohey, Pollard, Sprout	1:25
9.	"Exit Flagger"		2:19
10.	"14 Cheerleader Coldfront"	Sprout, R. Pollard	1:31
11.	"Back to Saturn X Radio Report"		1:33
12.	"Ergo Space Pig"	R. Pollard, Sprout	2:48
13.	"Circus World"		2:40
14.	"Some Drilling Implied"		1:40
15.	"On the Tundra"	J. Pollard, R. Pollard	2:38

== Personnel ==
The credits do not give specific instruments played by each individual, but rather list every performer who appeared on the release in any capacity.

=== Guided by Voices ===
- Robert Pollard
- Dan Toohey
- Jim Pollard
- Mitch Mitchell
- Tobin Sprout
- Greg Demos

==== Technical ====
- Mike "Rep" Hummel – engineering
