= Vintage Crime =

Vintage Crime may refer to:

- Vintage Books, an American publishing imprint created in 1954
- Vintage Crime/Black Lizard, the amalgamated company created in 1990
- Vintage Crime (EP), a 1995 record by the American rock band Cobra Verde
