= Waved Out =

Studio album by Robert Pollard
- Released: June 23, 1998
- Studio: Cro-Magnon Studios (Dayton, Ohio); Bloodbeast (Unknown location); Laundry & Lasers (Unknown location)
- Genre: Indie rock
- Label: Matador Records
- Producer: Robert Pollard

Robert Pollard chronology
Not in My Airforce (1996)	Waved Out (1998)	Kid Marine (1999)

Waved Out is the second solo studio album by the American indie rock musician Robert Pollard, released in 1998 on Matador Records.

== Critical reception ==
Professional ratings
Review scores
Source	Rating
AllMusic	3/5 stars
The Guardian	3/5 stars
Pitchfork	8.3/10

The Guardian wrote that "it's a GBV album in all but name, which means poor editing skills, an early Genesis fixation, and a song called 'Showbiz Opera Walrus' that could have been recorded in Pollard's bath." The Sunday Times thought that "perhaps—as ex-Car Ric Ocasek is set to produce the next GBV album—Waved Out was designed to be Pollard's last stab at his trademark lo- fi ramshackledness." The Dayton Daily News concluded that "on its shortest cuts, Waved Out sounds like standard Pollard, undercooked."

== Track listing ==
1. "Make Use" – 3:16
2. "Vibrations in the Woods" – 1:05
3. "Just Say the Word" – 3:00
4. "Subspace Biographies" – 2:57
5. "Caught Waves Again" – 1:52
6. "Waved Out" – 1:14
7. "Whiskey Ships" – 1:59
8. "Wrinkled Ghost" – 1:57
9. "Artificial Light" – 1:03
10. "People Are Leaving" – 2:37
11. "Steeple of Knives" – 2:12
12. "Rumbling Joker" – 2:53
13. "Showbiz Opera Walrus" – 2:34
14. "Pick Seeds from My Skull" – 1:07
15. "Second Step Next Language" – 4:34

== Personnel ==
=== Musicians ===
- Robert Pollard – vocals, guitar
- John Shough – bass guitar (tracks 1, 4, 7, 11, 12)
- Jim Macpherson – drums (tracks 1, 4, 7, 11, 12)
- Doug Gillard – guitar (track 5)
- Brett Owesly – organ (track 13)
- Tobin Sprout – piano (track 8)
- Kattie Dougherty – trumpet (track 7)

=== Technical ===
- Robert Pollard – engineering (track 5)
- Tobin Sprout – engineering (track 8, 14)
- Dave Doughman – engineering
- John Shough – engineering
- Frank Longo – cover artwork
- Mark Ohe – cover artwork
