= Egomania (disambiguation) =

Egomania is the psychological condition of an egomaniac.

Egomania or Egomaniac may also refer to:

- Egomania (film)
- Egomaniacs (album), a 1993 album by Kim Fahy, Jamie Harley and Kramer
- Egomania (Love Songs), a 1997 album by Cobra Verde
- Egomaniac (album), a 2016 album by Kongos
- "Egomaniac", a song by Human League from the album, Credo

== See also ==
- Egotism
- Egoism
