= Off the Floor =

Off the Floor may refer to:

- "Off the Floor", song by Guided by Voices from The Grand Hour 1993 EP
- "Off the Floor", song by Arcane Roots from Melancholia Hymns 2017
