= Viva la Muerte (album) =

Studio album by Cobra Verde
- Released: 1994
- Studios: 609, Bedford, Ohio
- Genre: Alternative rock
- Length: 40:20
- Label: Scat
- Producer: Cobra Verde

Cobra Verde chronology
Viva la Muerte (1994)	Vintage Crime (1995)

Viva la Muerte is the debut album by the American band Cobra Verde. It was released in 1994 through Scat Records.

== Critical reception ==
Professional ratings
Review scores
Source	Rating
AllMusic	4/5 stars
NME	7/10

Rolling Stone called the album "brooding glam coated in smokestack grime, like Diamond Dogs sabotaged by "Final Solution"-era Pere Ubu."

== Track listing ==
All tracks are written by Cobra Verde.

No.	Title	Length
1.	"Was It Good"	2:39
2.	"Gimme Your Heart"	2:53
3.	"Montenegro"	4:31
4.	"Despair"	5:07
5.	"Debt"	4:58
6.	"Already Dead"	4:23
7.	"Until the Killing Time"	3:29
8.	"I Thought You Knew (What Pleasure Was)"	8:08
9.	"Cease to Exist"	4:14

== Personnel ==
Cobra Verde

- Don Depew – bass guitar, guitar, piano, engineering
- Doug Gillard – guitar, bass guitar, electric piano, vocals
- John Petkovic – vocals, guitar
- Dave Swanson – drums, percussion, guitar, vocals

Production and additional personnel

- Cobra Verde – production
