= Total Exposure =

Total Exposure may refer to:

- Total Xposure, an Irish reality television show
- Total Exposure (film), a 1991 direct to video crime thriller film
- "Total Exposure", a song by Airport 5 from the album Tower in the Fountain of Sparks
- Total Exposure, a book by Jami Bernard
- Total Exposure, a book by Tori Carrington
- Total Exposure, an album by Poison Girls
