= The Grand Hour =

EP by Guided by Voices
- Released: 1993
- Genre: Rock and roll, indie rock
- Length: 9:27
- Label: Scat Records

Guided by Voices EP chronology
Forever Since Breakfast (1986)	The Grand Hour (1993)	Static Airplane Jive (1993)

Professional ratings
Review scores
Source	Rating
Allmusic	2.0/5.0 stars

The Grand Hour is a 1993 EP by Guided by Voices. "Shocker in Gloomtown" has remained in GbV concert setlists, and was in 1994 covered by the Breeders.

== Track listing ==
All songs written by Robert Pollard unless otherwise noted.

=== Side A ===
1. "I'll Get Over It" (Jim Pollard, R. Pollard, Tobin Sprout) – 0:39
2. "Shocker in Gloomtown" – 1:25
3. "Alien Lanes" (J. Pollard, R. Pollard, Sprout) – 2:32

=== Side B ===
4. "Off the Floor" (Sprout) – 0:53
5. "Break Even" – 2:28
6. "Bee Thousand" – 1:30

== Personnel ==
- Robert Pollard- vocals
- Tobin Sprout- guitar
- Jim Pollard- guitar
- Mitch Mitchell- bass guitar
- Kevin Fennell- drums, percussion
