= Not in My Airforce =

Studio album by Robert Pollard
- Released: September 10, 1996
- Recorded: 1995 – 1996
- Studio: Cro-Magnon Studios (Dayton, Ohio)
- Genre: Indie rock
- Label: Matador
- Producer: Robert Pollard

Robert Pollard chronology
Not in My Airforce (1996)	Waved Out (1998)

Professional ratings
Review scores
Source	Rating
NME	7/10

Not in My Airforce (1996) is the debut solo album by American indie rock musician Robert Pollard, released simultaneously with Tobin Sprout's Carnival Boy, just as the "classic" Guided by Voices lineup was dissolving.

In 2007, Pollard launched a new record label, Prom Is Coming Records, which took its name from a track off this album.

== Track listing ==
1. "Maggie Turns to Flies" – 3:14
2. "Quicksilver" – 1:06
3. "Girl Named Captain" – 2:02
4. "Get Under It" – 2:21
5. "Release the Sunbird" – 1:53
6. "John Strange School" – 1:15
7. "Parakeet Troopers" – 1:34
8. "One Clear Minute" – 0:48
9. "Chance to Buy an Island" – 2:27
10. "I've Owned You for Centuries" – 1:22
11. "The Ash Gray Proclamation" – 2:32
12. "Flat Beauty" – 1:50
13. "King of Arthur Avenue" – 1:37
14. "Roofer's Union Fight Song" – 1:31
15. "Psychic Pilot Clocks Out" – 4:02
16. "Prom Is Coming" – 1:55
17. "Party" – 0:44
18. "Did It Play?" – 0:59
19. "Double Standards Inc." – 1:23
20. "Punk Rock Gods" – 0:52
21. "Meet My Team" – 1:04
22. "Good Luck Sailor" – 0:48

== Personnel ==
=== Musicians ===
- Robert Pollard – vocals, guitar, bass guitar, organ
- Kevin Fennell – drums
- John Shough – bass, organ
- Jim Pollard – percussion (track 1)
- Jim Shepard – vocals (track 8), guitar (track 16)
- Matt Sweeney – guitar, vocals (track 2)
- Tobin Sprout – backing vocals (track 14)
- Dan Toohey – bass guitar (track 7)
- Mitch Mitchell – percussion (track 1)
- Steve Wilbur – slide guitar (track 15)

=== Technical ===
- Mark Ohe – cover artwork
- Robert Pollard – cover artwork
- Roger Seibel – mastering
- John Shough – engineering (tracks 1, 3–6, 9, 12, 13, 15, 17–22)
- Jim Pollard – technician
- Mitch Mitchell – engineering (track 11)
- Robert Pollard – engineering (tracks 8–16)
