= Kid Marine =

Studio album by Robert Pollard
- Released: February 2, 1999
- Recorded: 1998
- Studio: Cro-Magnon Studios (Dayton, Ohio)
- Genre: Indie rock
- Length: 37:14
- Label: Fading Captain Series
- Producers: Robert Pollard; Jim Pollard; John Shough

Robert Pollard chronology
Waved Out (1998)	Kid Marine (1999)	Speak Kindly of Your Volunteer Fire Department (1999)

Kid Marine is the third solo studio album by American indie rock musician Robert Pollard, released in 1999. It is the first release of Robert Pollard's Fading Captain Series.

== Background ==
Pollard has stated that the album is about Jeff "Kid Marine" Davis, one of the people pictured on the cover. Robert told Mojo magazine, "My personal favorite: a weird record, almost a concept album, about the typical Ohio male and what he does - drink, watch television, eat pizza. It got mixed reviews; there are people who hate it and others who think it's our best record and I'm on their side. I just love the songs. It feels like one piece, like it all fits together. I like the cover and I like the whole package."

Pollard has also stated he would like to work on a second Kid Marine (Kid Marine 2) at some point in the future, exploring similar themes and concepts.

== Reception ==
CMJ New Music Monthly said it "could best be described as breezy rather than half-assed. A solid batch: a few flashes of outright brilliance, nothing embarrassing, and plenty of warmth. Several GBV members, including Tobin Sprout and brother Jim Pollard, guest on the record, ensuring a rich sound."

== Track listing ==
1. "Submarine Teams" – 4:55
2. "Flings of the Waistcoat Crowd" – 1:42
3. "The Big Make-Over" – 1:56
4. "Men Who Create Fright" – 2:11
5. "Television Prison" – 1:57
6. "Strictly Comedy" – 1:40
7. "Far-Out Crops" – 3:30
8. "Living Upside Down" – 2:14
9. "Snatch Candy" – 1:33
10. "White Gloves Come Off" – 2:27
11. "Enjoy Jerusalem!" – 2:16
12. "You Can't Hold Your Women" – 1:52
13. "Town of Mirrors" – 3:12
14. "Powerblessings" – 1:54
15. "Island Crimes" – 3:49

== Personnel ==
=== Musicians ===
- Robert Pollard – lead vocals, keyboard, guitar, violin (track 4)
- Greg Demos – bass guitar
- Jim Macpherson – drums
- Tobin Sprout – piano (track 7)
- Kim Pollard – vocals (track 5)
- Jim Pollard – sound effects (track 2)

=== Technical ===
- John Shough – engineering
- Greg Demos – engineering (track 2, 11)
- Tobin Sprout – engineering (track 14)
- Jeff Graham – mastering
- Nick Kizirnis – layout
- Pam Stacey – photography
