= Vintage Crime (EP) =

EP by Cobra Verde
- Released: November 15, 1995
- Recorded: 609 Recording in Bedford, Ohio
- Genre: Alternative rock
- Length: 21:05
- Label: Scat
- Producer: Cobra Verde

Cobra Verde chronology
Viva la Muerte (1994)	Vintage Crime (1995)	Egomania (Love Songs) (1997)

Professional ratings
Review scores
Source	Rating
Allmusic	4/5 stars

Vintage Crime is an EP by Cobra Verde, released on November 15, 1995, through Scat Records.

== Track listing ==
All tracks are written by Cobra Verde, except "Fire of Love" by Jody Reynolds and Sonja Sturdivant.

No.	Title	Length
1.	"Catalogue"	3:09
2.	"World Doesn't End"	3:19
3.	"Media Whore"	2:59
4.	"Wish I Was Here"	4:15
5.	"Every God for Himself"	4:24
6.	"Fire of Love"	2:59

== Personnel ==
Cobra Verde

- Don Depew – bass guitar, acoustic guitar, vocals, engineering
- Doug Gillard – guitar, acoustic guitar, vocals
- John Petkovic – vocals, guitar, synthesizer
- Dave Swanson – drums, percussion, guitar

Production and additional personnel

- Chris Brokaw – guitar on "Fire of Love"
- Cobra Verde – production, design
- Robert Griffin – design
