= Egomania (Love Songs) =

Studio album by Cobra Verde
- Released: May 5, 1997
- Recorded: 609 Recording in Bedford, Ohio
- Genre: Alternative rock
- Length: 36:01
- Label: Scat
- Producer: Cobra Verde

Cobra Verde chronology
Vintage Crime (1995)	Egomania (Love Songs) (1997)	Nightlife (1999)

Professional ratings
Review scores
Source	Rating
AllMusic	4/5 stars
Chicago Tribune	4/4 stars
Entertainment Weekly	B+

Egomania (Love Songs) is the second album by Cobra Verde, released in 1997 through Scat Records.

== Critical reception ==
The Chicago Tribune wrote: "Creating classic rock in the best sense of the term, this Ohio quartet meshes instrumental prowess, great songwriting, passion and a dark edge in ways that one rarely encounters today."

== Track listing ==
All tracks are written by Cobra Verde, except "Underpants" by Easter Monkeys and "Chinese Radiation" by Pere Ubu.

No.	Title	Length
1.	"Everything to You"	4:01
2.	"A Story I Can Sell"	3:13
3.	"Still Breaking Down"	3:35
4.	"Leather"	3:10
5.	"Underpants"	2:22
6.	"Blood on the Moon"	4:02
7.	"Until It's Gone"	5:19
8.	"For My Woman"	3:09
9.	"Chinese Radiation"	3:16
10.	"Never My Love"	3:54

== Personnel ==
Cobra Verde

- Don Depew – bass guitar, guitar, vocals, engineering
- Doug Gillard – guitar, bass guitar, keyboards, vocals
- John Petkovic – vocals, guitar, keyboards
- Dave Swanson – drums, guitar

Production and additional personnel

- Nick Amster – mixing
- Cobra Verde – production
- Bruce Gigaz – mixing
- Robert Pollard – vocals
