= The Taller You Are, the Shorter You Get =

- CD edition cover art

Studio album by My Dad Is Dead
- Released: July 24, 1989
- Recorded: 1988–1989
- Studio: The Beat Farm (Cleveland, Ohio)
- Genre: Post-punk
- Length: 82:58 (LP); 72:04 (CD)
- Label: Homestead
- Producer: Chris Burgess

My Dad Is Dead chronology
| Let's Skip the Details (1988) | The Taller You Are, the Shorter You Get (1989) | Chopping Down the Family Tree (1991) |

Professional ratings
Review scores
| Source | Rating |
|---|---|
| AllMusic | 4.5/5 stars |

The Taller You Are, the Shorter You Get is an album by the American post-punk band My Dad Is Dead, released in 1989 through Homestead Records.

== Production ==
Aside from some bass and accordion, Mark Edwards played all of the instruments on the album.

== Critical reception ==
Trouser Press wrote: "Edwards veers relatively close to the musical mainstream ... with considerable success. His lyrics, meanwhile, have grown less morose and more philosophical, and he sings them with new-found expressiveness." Tiny Mix Tapes wrote that the album "covers everything from pretty, jangly guitar instrumentals to Joy Division- and Devo-referencing New Wave numbers."

== Track listing ==
Side one
| No. | Title | Writer(s) | Length |
|---|---|---|---|
| 1. | "For Lack of a Better Word" | Mark Edwards | 5:10 |
| 2. | "The Big Picture" | Jeff Curtis/Mark Edwards | 6:24 |
| 3. | "Seven Years" | Mark Edwards | 5:10 |
| 4. | "Too Far Gone" | Mark Edwards | 4:29 |

Side two
| No. | Title | Writer(s) | Length |
|---|---|---|---|
| 1. | "Planes Crashing" | Mark Edwards | 4:30 |
| 2. | "Boundaries" | Mark Edwards | 3:53 |
| 3. | "Can't Get Started" | Mark Edwards | 5:26 |
| 4. | "The Only One" | Mark Edwards | 4:54 |

Side three
| No. | Title | Writer(s) | Length |
|---|---|---|---|
| 1. | "World on a String (CD edition cuts lengthy instrumental intro)" | Mark Edwards | 5:27 |
| 2. | "Meep – Meep (Absent on CD edition)" | Jeff Curtis/Mark Edwards | 5:25 |
| 3. | "What Can I Do" | Jeff Curtis/Mark Edwards | 6:26 |

Side four
| No. | Title | Writer(s) | Length |
|---|---|---|---|
| 1. | "Whirlpool" | Jeff Curtis/Mark Edwards | 3:00 |
| 2. | "Nothing Special" | Mark Edwards | 4:49 |
| 3. | "A Man Possessed" | Mark Edwards | 5:11 |
| 4. | "Sweet Company" (Absent on CD edition) | Jeff Curtis/Mark Edwards | 5:29 |
| 5. | "So Much to Lose" | Jeff Curtis/Mark Edwards | 5:33 |

== Personnel ==
My Dad Is Dead

- Mark Edwards – vocals, instruments
- Jeff Curtis – bass guitar

Additional musicians and production

- Chris Burgess – production, engineering, mixing
- Tim Gilbride – photography
- James Wilson – accordion on "Sweet Company"
