= The Universe & Me =

Studio album by Tobin Sprout
- Released: 2017
- Genre: Indie Rock
- Label: Burger Records

Tobin Sprout chronology
The Bluebirds of Happiness Tried to Land on My Shoulder (2010)	The Universe & Me (2017)	Empty Horses (2020)

The Universe & Me is the sixth solo effort released by Tobin Sprout, it was released in 2017.

== Track listing ==
1. Future Boy Today/Man Of Tomorrow – 2:47
2. The Universe And Me – 3:47
3. A Walk Across The Human Bridge – 2:30
4. Manifest Street – 2:24
5. Honor Guards – 1:56
6. When I Was A Boy – 2:21
7. Cowboy Curtains – 1:58
8. Heavenly Bones – 2:15
9. Heart Of Wax – 2:13
10. I Fall You Fall – 4:03
11. Tomorrow From Heaven – 3:47
12. Just One Kid (Takes On The World) – 2:37
13. To Wake Up June – 2:06
14. Future Boy (Reprise) – 1:40

Professional ratings
Review scores
Source	Rating
allmusic	3.5/5.0 stars
Pitchfork	6.7
