= The Pagans =

American punk rock band

- Origin: Cleveland, Ohio, United States
- Genres: Punk rock
- Years active: 1977–1979; 1982–1983; 1986–1989; 2014–2017
- Labels: Neck Records, Drome, Crypt Records, Terminal Records, Treehouse Records, Glitterhouse Records, Smog Veil Records, Ruin Discos
- Members: John Dzubak; Eric Schrader; Justin Lack
- Past members: Mike Hudson; Brian Hudson; Tim Allee; Robert Conn (Bill DeGidio); Mike "Tommy Gunn" Metoff; Bob Richey; Chas Smith; David Scott Liston; Loren Molinare; Mike D'Amico; Tony Matteucci; Ben Reagan; Denny Carleton

The Pagans were an American punk rock band from Cleveland, Ohio, United States. Originally active from 1977 to 1979, they reformed several times, with new incarnations in 1982-83, 1986-99, and 2014-17. Along with fellow Cleveland band The Dead Boys, the Pagans were part of the first wave of American punk music, and were also part of the second wave of Cleveland proto-punk and post-punk bands such as Pere Ubu.

== History ==
=== 1970s ===
The precursor to the Pagans was the Mad Stagger, a garage rock band formed in 1974 by brothers Mike Hudson (guitar) and Brian “Brian Morgan" Hudson (drums), and bassist Tim Allee. They formed the Pagans in 1977, adding singer Robert Conn (née Bill Degidio) and issuing a debut single that year, "Six and Change". By 1978, Conn had left (to form the AK-47s and later, Defnics), with Mike Hudson switching to vocals and the addition of guitarist Mike "Tommy Gunn" Metoff. The Pagans released three additional singles: ""Street Where Nobody Lives" (1978), "Dead End America" (1979) and "Not Now No Way" (1979). After failed album sessions, the band broke up in November 1979.

=== 1980s ===
After the Pagans’ original lineup disbanded, Metoff formed the Clocks, later known as Radio Alarm Clocks, while Allee played in Broncs.

In 1982, Mike Hudson and Metoff joined forces again in new band Les Raving Sounds, which transformed into a new lineup of the Pagans, also featuring Conn on bass, Bob Richey on drums and Chas Smith on keyboards. This lineup toured and released The Pagans LP (later reissued as The Pink Album) before splitting again in 1983. Metoff then joined the Cramps from 1983 to 1984.

In 1986, Treehouse Records issued Buried Alive, a vinyl LP compilation of their recordings, sparking another Pagans reunion and resulting in the release of The Godlike Power of the Pagans Live (1987). This lineup (Mike Hudson, Metoff, Allee, Richey and additional drummer David Scott Liston) ended in 1989, although recordings from 1988 to 1989 were later issued on the 1990 German album Family Fare and live release The Blue Album (2008).

Metoff, Allee and Liston all recorded as part of Cheetah Chrome and the Ghetto Dogs; their 1987 recordings were issued as an eponymous EP in 1993.

=== 1990s ===
During the 1990s, Mike Hudson briefly played with the Murder Junkies, recorded the Unmedicated solo album (not released until 2006), and sang for the Highrollers and the Styrenes.

Original drummer Brian Hudson, who had also played for the Kingpins, Jules Baptiste/Red Decade, Chris Bond Band, the Ashley Alexander Big Band, Backbønes and the Droogs during his 1980s career, died in 1991.

In 1994, a CD compilation of Pagans material, Everybody Hates You, was released by Crypt Records.

=== 2000s ===
In 2001, Crypt Records issued two other compilation CDs: Shit Street and The Pink Album…Plus!. Mike Hudson, Metoff, Allee and Richey held one-off reunion performances at the Rock and Roll Hall of Fame in Cleveland in 2003, and in Chicago in 2005.

Smith, who also played in Cobra Verde and Einstein's Secret Orchestra, died in October 2007.

Metoff formed Motherfucker 666 with Jeff Dahl, Allee joined Lurid, while Conn later performed the music of the Pagans alongside similarly styled originals in his band Chelsea Hotel.

Mike Hudson, later a journalist and editor-in-chief of the Niagara Falls Reporter newspaper, chronicled the band's history in his 2008 autobiographical book Diary of a Punk: Life and Death in the Pagans. He reformed the Pagans again in 2014 for the Hollywood High album, backed by an all-new lineup of Loren Molinare (guitar), Mike D'Amico (bass), Tony Matteucci (drums) and Ben Reagan (guitar). In 2015, he brought in another new lineup of John Dzubak (guitar), Eric Schrader (bass) and Justin Lack (drums).

Mike Hudson died on October 27, 2017, from sepsis at the age of 61.

== Members ==
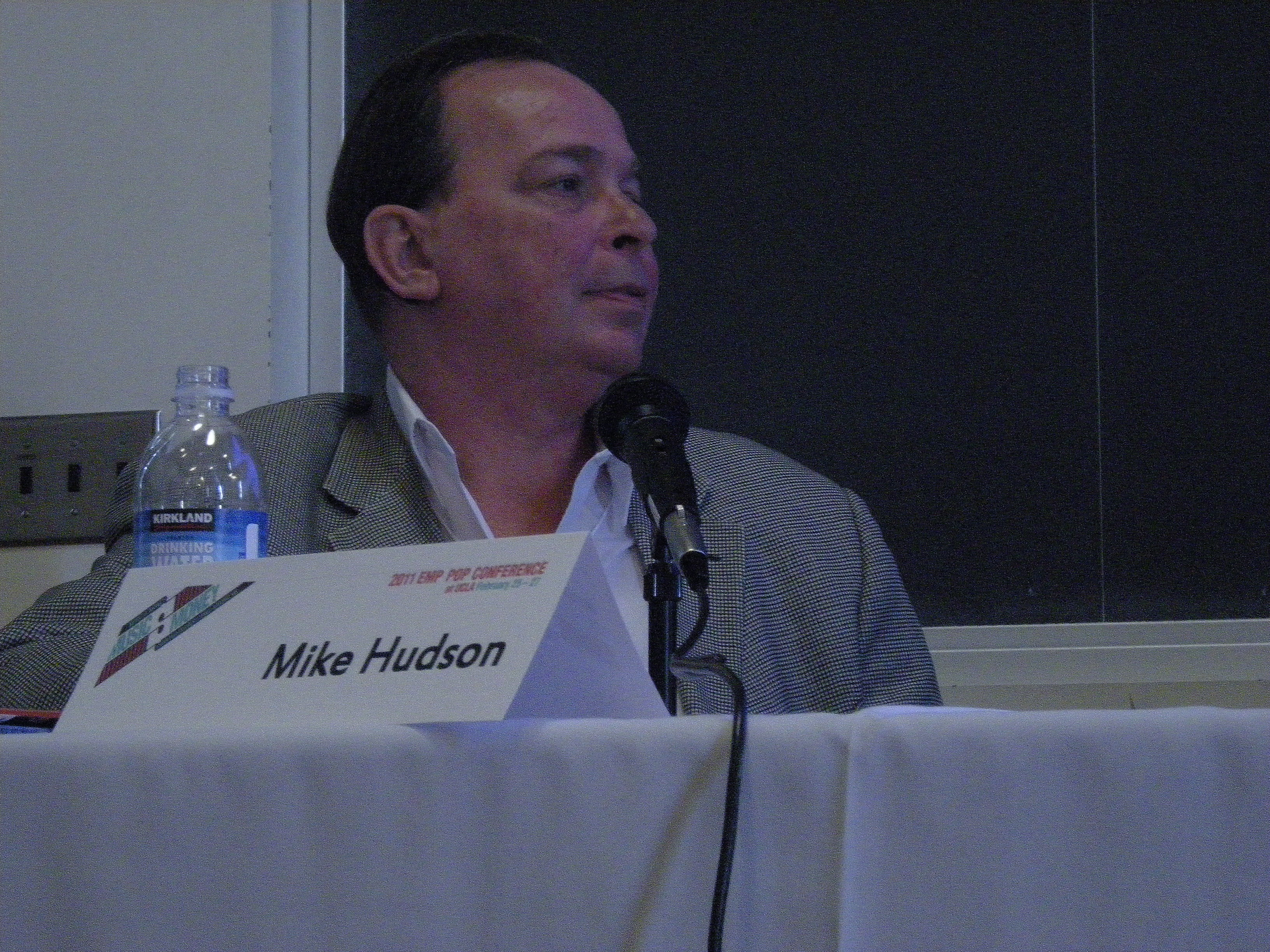
Mike Hudson, 2011

Original lineup Mk. 1 (1977)

- Mike Hudson - Guitar
- Brian " Brian Morgan" Hudson - Drums
- Tim Allee - Bass
- Robert Conn - Vocals

Original lineup Mk. 2 (1978—1979)

- Mike Hudson - Vocals
- Brian " Brian Morgan" Hudson - Drums
- Mike "Tommy Gunn" Metoff - Guitar
- Tim Allee - Bass

Second lineup (1982—1983)

- Mike Hudson - Vocals, guitar
- Mike "Tommy Gunn" Metoff - Lead guitar
- Robert Conn - Bass
- Bob Richey - Drums
- Chas Smith - Keyboards

Third lineup (1986—1989)

- Mike Hudson - Vocals, guitar
- Mike "Tommy Gunn" Metoff - Lead guitar
- Tim Allee - Bass
- Bob Richey - Drums
- David Scott Liston - Drums

Fourth lineup (2014—2015)

- Mike Hudson - Vocals
- Loren Molinare - Guitar
- Mike D'Amico - Bass
- Tony Matteucci - Drums
- Ben Reagan - Guitar

Fifth lineup (2015—2017)

- Mike Hudson - Vocals
- John Dzubak - Guitar
- Eric Schrader - Bass
- Justin Lack - Drums
