= Chas Smith =

American author and musician (1957–2007)

Chas Smith (AKA Charles Vincent Smith) (1957–2007) was an American author, musician, radio personality, and a Cleveland State University music instructor.

== Biography ==
Smith taught and explored the cultural aspects of American Roots music for more than twenty years. He held both a bachelor's and a master's degree in music from Cleveland State University, where he offered “The Roots of Rock and Soul”, a class on American rock music and its roots, and he taught basic music composition to little children through a program with the Cleveland Opera as a music mentor in grade schools.

Smith sang and played keyboards, bass guitar, and theremin for more than 30 years in many different genres. He was in The Clocks (a.k.a. Radio Alarm Clocks), a popular Cleveland punk band in the late 1970s and early '80s, then he was keyboardist for the latter-day version of The Pagans. In 1993, he formed the band Einstein's Secret Orchestra (later called Einstein's Secret Outlaws), voted Best Electronic/Instrumental Band at the Cleveland Free Times Music Awards in 2001, and produced two CDs of ESO's music, with others produced by the SubGenius Foundation. He also toured with Cobra Verde as keyboardist from 1997 through the early 2000s, and played with the country-blues Americana band The Fullbrights.

He and the band ESO often appeared on stage with Rev. Ivan Stang of the Church of the SubGenius, and perform on several of their CDs and DVDs. He spent more than 20 years creating soundscapes on his weekly SwampRadio ESO radio show at WCSB in Cleveland. He performed live on-the-air comedy with Brain Rot Theater on Swamp Radio, and with Rev. Ivan Stang and the cast of The Hour of Slack, the Church of the SubGenius syndicated radio show. He was a board member of A.C.E. and appeared at both the Starwood Festival and the WinterStar Symposium, offering both performances and classes on music history and electronic trance music, and hosted a dance event within the Starwood Festival called the "Rumble in the Jungle".

Smith died on October 16, 2007, after suffering a stroke complicated with pneumonia, and fighting a recurrent battle with Hodgkin's lymphoma due to complications from the HIV virus, eventually leading to auto immune deficiency syndrome.

On Friday November 23, 2007, a tribute event called Chasfest: The Rumble in the Urban Jungle was held at the Beachland Ballroom in his honor. All proceeds went to his family to help defray medical bills. Feature performers included Cobra Verde, 14th Floor, Stardust Outlaws, The Fullbrights, Caelyn, the surviving members of Einstein's Secret Orchestra (including members from past incarnations of the group and Ron Slabe), a set by combined members of the bands The Pagans, The Clocks, and Venus Envy, a drum circle that included several members of the Association for Consciousness Exploration (who also contributed to the audio and provided video projection created by Rev. Ivan Stang of the Church of the SubGenius for the event), and a special guest appearance by Egyptian composer Halim El-Dabh.

== Bibliography ==
- From Woodstock to the Moon: The Cultural Evolution of Rock Music (2001, Kendall-Hunt Publishing) ISBN 0-7872-7877-7, ISBN 978-0-7872-7877-9
- The Soul of Sunrise: Grassroots Music in America (2005, Kendall-Hunt Publishing), ISBN 0-7575-1566-5, ISBN 978-0-7575-1566-8
- Rumble in the Jungle: The Soul of Indigenous Music in the Americas (2007, Kendall-Hunt Publishing), ISBN 0-7575-4293-X, ISBN 978-0-7575-4293-0

== Discography ==
=== Albums ===
- The Pagans (the pink album) (1983) Terminal TERM - 7 (reissued in 1988 by Treehouse) (LP)
- Wake Me When It's Over - Radio Alarm Clocks (1983), After Hours Records (LP)
- Venus Envy - Venus Envy (1985), Herb Jackson Records
- Live From Studio "A" - The Clocks
- Circus Saints and Sinners - Fourteenth Floor - Synthetic Records
- XX-Day '99 - Rev. Ivan Stang & Einstein's Secret Orchestra (1999), SubGenius Foundation
- PufferDome Devival - Rev. Ivan Stang & Einstein's Secret Orchestra (1999), SubGenius Foundation
- Witch Disco - Einstein's Secret Orchestra (1999), SwampRadio Records
- Nightlife - Cobra Verde (1999), Motel
- Sex in Another Dimension - Einstein's Secret Orchestra (2000), Swamp Music Records
- ESO Swamp Radio / Hour of Slack Best of #1 - Rev. Ivan Stang, Chas Smith & Lonesome Cowboy Dave DeLuca (2001), SubGenius Foundation

=== Video ===
- X-Day 1998 - Einstein's Secret Orchestra (1998) (VHS), SubGenius Foundation
- XX-Day '99 - Rev. Ivan Stang & Einstein's Secret Orchestra (1999) (VHS), SubGenius Foundation
- 5 X-Day - Einstein's Secret Outlaws (2002) (DVD), SubGenius Foundation
