= Life Starts Here =

Studio album by Airport 5
- Released: 2002
- Genre: Alternative rock, Indie, Lo-fi
- Label: Fading Captain Series

Airport 5 chronology
Tower in the Fountain of Sparks (2001)	Life Starts Here (2002)

Life Starts Here is the second and last album by the Airport 5, released in 2002.

== Track listing ==
All songs written by Robert Pollard and Tobin Sprout.

1. Intro - 1.07
2. We're In The Business - 2.31
3. Yellow Wife No. 5 - 2.11
4. Wrong Drama Addiction (...And Life Starts Here...) - 7.25
5. However Young They Are - 2.38
6. The Dawntrust Guarantee - 1.14
7. Forever Since - 2.40
8. Impressions Of A Leg - 2.21
9. How Brown? - 4.39
10. Natives Approach Our Plane - 3.02
11. I Can't Freeze Anymore - 3.30
12. Out In The World - 2.33

Professional ratings
Review scores
Source	Rating
AllMusic	3.0/5.0 stars
