= Airport 5 =

American indie rock duo

- Origin: Dayton, Ohio
- Genres: Indie rock
- Years active: 2001–2002
- Labels: Fading Captain Series; Rockathon Records
- Spinoff of: Guided by Voices
- Past members: Robert Pollard; Tobin Sprout

Airport 5 was an American musical collaboration project between indie rock musicians Robert Pollard and Tobin Sprout, both members of the band Guided by Voices. Collaborating chiefly by mail, Sprout provided completed backing tracks which he composed, and Pollard added his own lyrics and vocals. Two 7-inch singles and two full-length albums were released between 2001 and 2002: Tower in the Fountain of Sparks and Life Starts Here.

== Discography ==
=== Studio albums ===
- Tower in the Fountain of Sparks – (2001)
- Life Starts Here – (2002)

==== Singles ====
- Stifled Man Casino (7" - Fading Captain Series ) – (2001)
- Total Exposure (7" - Fading Captain Series ) – (2001)

==== Compilations ====
- Selective Service (Fading Captain Series - with Guided By Voices) – (2001)
