= Peace, Love and Murder =

Studio album by My Dad Is Dead
- Released: 1987 May
- Recorded: 1986 Summer / Fall
- Studio: Beat Farm; Cleveland, OH
- Genre: alternative rock, indie rock american underground
- Length: 40:32
- Label: Birth Records; House in Motion
- Producer: Chris Burgess

My Dad Is Dead chronology
... and he's not going to take it anymore (1986)	Peace, Love and Murder (1987)	Let's Skip the Details (1988)

Peace, Love and Murder is the third album by American rock band My Dad Is Dead, released on vinyl in May 1987 by Birth Records, later reissued on CD and vinyl by Houses In Motion.

== Reception ==
Professional ratings
Review scores
Source	Rating
Robert Christgau	unfavourable
Trouser Press	favourable

Trouser Press called it "a compelling, hypnotic debut".

== Track listing ==
- All songs written by Mark Edwards except when stated.
1. "Force Feed" - 3:54
2. "Babe in the Woods" - 3:05
3. "Open Wide" - 3:48
4. "the Dark Side" - 3:35
5. "Like a Vise" - 5:22
6. "Breakdown" - 4:34
7. "Hill O' Beans" - 4:29
8. "Your Love" - 3:49
9. "20 Yards Deep" - 3:19
10. "Fireball" - 4:37

Notes

Recorded Summer/Fall 1986.
Comes with lyric sheet.

== Credits ==
- Directed by, Songwriter, six-string Guitar, Vocals, Bass Guitar, Drum Machine programs sequenced by – Mark Edwards
- Back Cover Photography by – Tim Gilbride
- Producer– Chris Burgess
