= Moonflower Plastic =

Moonflower Plastic (Welcome to My Wigwam)

Studio album by Tobin Sprout
- Released: August 28, 1997
- Recorded: Cro-Magnon Studios; Refraze Recording Studios
- Genre: Indie pop, Indie rock
- Label: Matador

Tobin Sprout chronology
Carnival Boy (1996)	Moonflower Plastic (Welcome to My Wigwam) (1997)	Let's Welcome the Circus People (1999)

Professional ratings
Review scores
Source	Rating
Allmusic	4.5/5.0 stars

Moonflower Plastic (Welcome to My Wigwam) is the second studio album by the rock artist Tobin Sprout, member of the band Guided by Voices. It was released in 1997 on Matador. Fellow GBV bandmate Kevin Fennell helped with the drumming on this release.

== Reception ==
It is considered his best album on AllMusic ("album pick") of Tobin's discography and earned a very positive 4.5/5 stars from the review of Stephen Thomas Erlewine.

== Track listing ==
1. "Get Out of My Throat" – 4:01
2. "Moonflower Plastic (You're Here)" – 2:18
3. "Paper Cut" – 3:00
4. "Beast of Souls" – 3:27
5. "A Little Odd" – 0:40
6. "Angels Hang Their Socks on the Moon" – 4:35
7. "All Used Up" – 2:00
8. "Since I:::" – 3:08
9. "Back Chorus" – 0:37
10. "Curious Things" – 2:42
11. "Exit Planes" – 3:21
12. "Little Bit of Dread" – 2:13
13. "Hit Junky Dives" – 4:16
14. "Water on the Boater's Back" – 2:02

== Personnel ==
- Tobin Sprout – Vocals, bass, composer, drums, guitar, keyboards, organ, piano

=== Other/Production ===
- Kevin Fennell – Drums
- John Peterson – Drums
- Joe Buben – Drums
- Billy Mason – Drums
- Gary King – Engineer, mixing
- John Shough – Engineer, mixing
