= Cobra Verde (band) =

Cleveland rock band formed in 1994

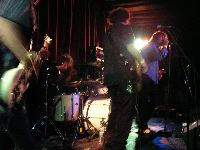

Background information
- Origin: Cleveland, Ohio
- Genres: Rock
- Instruments: Vocals, guitar, bass, drums
- Years active: 1994–present
- Labels: Scat Records, MuscleTone Records, Motel Records, Sub Pop, Elektra

Cobra Verde is an American rock band formed in Cleveland, Ohio. Founded in 1994, the group has released six albums, including the acclaimed Nightlife, Easy Listening, and Haven't Slept All Year.

Cobra Verde's music has been featured on television programs such as True Blood, Entourage, The OC, Shameless, and Sons of Anarchy. In addition, the group performed on The OC as a Foreigner tribute band at a birthday party held at the show's fictional club, "The Bait Shop."

Cobra Verde includes singer-guitarist John Petkovic, Mark Klein (drums-vocals), Tim Parnin (guitar), Ed Sotelo (bass-vocals), and Frank Vazzano. This has been the longest-running line-up for the band, its origins going as far back as 1998.

The band's sound has been described as post-punk, glam rock, hard rock, and garage rock. In a review of the band's 2003 album, Easy Listening, the Boston Phoenix compared Cobra Verde to the MC5, due to lyrics and guitars that "blur the line between revolution and hedonism."

Salon.com compared Cobra Verde to glam-rock, and specifically compared the band's 1999 album, Nightlife, to director Todd Haynes' film, Velvet Goldmine. "Haynes would have fared far better if he had consulted John Petkovic and his band Cobra Verde."

The band has drawn comparison to '70s glam-rock because of the art work for Nightlife by noted photographer Mick Rock, who chronicled David Bowie, Queen, Lou Reed, and Iggy Pop in the 1970s.

== History ==
Cobra Verde started as a one-off studio project for Scat Records, a St. Louis-based imprint responsible for releasing records by seminal Cleveland bands such as electric eels and Dayton, Ohio band Guided by Voices.

Petkovic, the sole continuous member throughout Cobra Verde's 20-year history, enlisted guitarist Doug Gillard and drummer Dave Swanson, with whom he had played in Death of Samantha. Studio engineer Don Depew played bass.

To reflect the one-off nature of the project, Petkovic named the ensuing album Viva La Muerte (meaning "long live death"), after the battle cry of the Spanish Foreign Legion. The album was subtitled "death in small doses." The project lacked a name, however.

"I didn't even have a name for the thing until the cover art for the record was being sent off," said Petkovic, in a 1996 interview with Flipside magazine. "So I had a friend call me who happened to be hanging out with Werner Herzog – so he asks Herzog to suggest a name. So he says Cobra Verde -- the name of the last film he shot with Klaus Kinski – in honor of Klaus."

Rolling Stone called the Viva La Muerte album "provocative grime, like Diamond Dogs sabotaged by Final Solution-era Pere Ubu." The same line-up also recorded Vintage Crime (an EP that included an appearance of Chris Brokaw, of the Boston band Come) before being recruited to play in Guided by Voices, backing Robert Pollard on the 1997 album Mag Earwhig!

A breakup of the GBV lineup led to a shake-up in Cobra Verde with the entry of Klein (of the Cleveland heavy-metal band Breaker) and Vazzano (of the Cleveland rock band Quazimodo) in 1998. The following year saw the addition of keyboardist and theremin player Chas Smith and bassist Dave Hill. Smith, who died in 2007, was a member of noted Cleveland bands the Pagans and Radio Alarm Clocks, and served as a board member for the parody cult known as the Church of the Subgenius. Hill played in the band until 2002, leaving to pursue comedy and acting. Hill was replaced by Edward Angel Sotelo, an Argentine-born musician who had played in Cleveland-based post-punk Proletarian Art Threat. At this point, Cobra Verde included guitarist Derek Deprator who was replaced by Jovan Karcic (of noted Columbus group Gaunt). Karcic was replaced by J Mascis of Dinosaur Jr., who toured with Cobra Verde and played on Easy Listening.(Petkovic and Mascis would later go on to play together in the band Sweet Apple.) Tim Parnin (of Cleveland band Sons of Elvis) joined in 2004, taking Mascis' spot and filling out the longest-running line-up for Cobra Verde.

== Releases ==
Nightlife

The 1999 album marked the beginning of Cobra Verde as an ongoing touring band. The 12-song disc earned four-star review by Rolling Stone, which called it "a treatise on fidelity and illusion, cold ambition and betrayal." "Nightlife" was widely acclaimed, receiving praise from the Los Angeles Times, The Washington Post, Alternative Press, The Onion, The New York Times, and Village Voice.

TimeOut New York wrote that "CV explores of rock music's classic themes: love, revolution, self-destruction and identity" and called the album "a stunning display of everything that makes rock music vital."

Nightlife received comparisons to glam-rock, in part because of Rock's artwork, but also because the album cover features model Lisa Ronson, the daughter of glam-rock guitarist and Bowie collaborator Mick Ronson.

A Magnet magazine article, "The Last Rock Star," attributed the band's over-the-top sensibilities to "growing up all wrong," which included Petkovic's parents taking him to nude beaches in Europe when he was a child.

Easy Listening

Recorded by Depew, the album's cover is an homage to the 1974 French softcore pornographic film, Emmanuelle. The album features guitar contributions by J Mascis, who joined Cobra Verde for a United States tour. A video for the opening track, "Riot Industry," starring Mike Watt, George Wendt, and Rudy Ray Moore was acclaimed by Entertainment Weekly, Pitchfork, and Billboard.

Resembling the easy listening genre not at all, Easy Listening is all "powerhouse guitar riffs and wham-bam choruses". The album followed up on the success of Nightlife and became a breakthrough for the group. It was acclaimed in Playboy, the Chicago Tribune, the Boston Globe, FHM, Blender, and the Village Voice. All Music Guide gave it an "A−" and called the album "nothing less than a masterpiece of glammed-up sexual obsession, agit-pop antics and indie rock glitter." The New York Times wrote: "The dangerous, ironic aura of glam-rock fascinates Cobra Verde, a band from Cleveland that folds new paradoxes into the anthems and angles of the 1970's style. Its new album, Easy Listening (MuscleTone), slightly smooths out its music but not its barbed wit."

The song "Modified Frankenstein" appeared in the 2003 film Carolina, starring Julia Stiles. It was released on MC5 guitarist Wayne Kramer's Muscletone Records.

Copycat Killers

Released in 2005, the all-covers disc was originally meant as an experiment in recording techniques—applying ideas to covers that would then be applied to an album of all originals. The album included covers ranging from "I Feel Love" (Donna Summer) to "Urban Guerilla" (Hawkwind). Never intended to be released at first, it yielded a number of songs that were featured on TV shows, including "I Want You," which appeared as the musical backdrop to a clumsy sex scene in the Denis Leary FX Network show, Rescue Me.

In a Rolling Stone review of Copycat Killers, David Fricke wrote: "It helps to know a little about Cobra Verde's roots in Cleveland underground-rock lore to appreciate the breadth of repertoire on this all-covers album. But the fun is obvious, as Cobra Verde remake Pink's "Get the Party Started" and the Fall's "The Dice Man" in their own glam-devil image and play the Troggs, Undertones, and Mott the Hoople songs here like they wish they'd written them."

Haven't Slept All Year

Released in 2008 (after one-year delay while the band was on hiatus), Haven't Slept All Year was recorded by Klein at his Noise Floor Studio, in Bedford, Ohio. Two of the songs on the album were premiered on TV shows before it was officially released. The opening track, "World Can't Have Her," appeared on the HBO series Entourage, while "Riot in the Foodcourt" appeared on the FX Networks drama Sons of Anarchy. Songs on "Haven't Slept All Year" also ended up being featured in shows such as the MTV reality show The City (2010) and the MTV horror comedy Death Valley (2011). "World Can't Have Her" ended up in the Showtime series Shameless (2012).

Alternative Press, in a review of "Haven't Slept All Year," wrote, "Glamorous decay and excessive partying has never sounded sexier, dirtier or more fun." Pitchfork wrote: "Cobra Verde's music has always simmered with nocturnal menace and seedy suggestion, but on Haven't Slept All Year, there's a greater awareness of the price for staying up all night: Having to make amends in the morning."

Dusted Magazine put "Haven't Slept All Year" in context with the band's history and the musical landscape: "The only thing more surprising than Cobra Verde's existence this far into the new millennium is the quality of its recordings. Fifteen years since Viva La Muerte, their debut on Scat Records, Petkovic and Co. continue to rock hard in the face of the impending cultural apocalypse. With that in mind, Haven't Slept All Year is an ideal soundtrack for the current trash heap that is our society. Cobra Verde cast their net wide and work with whatever comes slithering back, compressing it all into a weighty chunk of glittering pop-rock smite to be hurdled at whoever needs a knock on the head.

In September 2014, Cobra Verde announced on cobraverde.com that they would be touring again and returning to the studio to record its next album.

== Appearances ==
The OC

Cobra Verde recorded a version of "Waiting for a Girl Like You" for the Fox television teen drama The OC. The band also performed the song on the show, called "The Journey," which aired March 16, 2006. Cobra Verde plays a Foreigner tribute band that has been hired by Seth Cohen (Adam Brody) to perform at a birthday party for his friend Ryan Atwood (Ben McKenzie). Ryan is a Journey fan, however, which becomes the running joke of the episode. Seth tells Ryan that "he couldn't get the real Journey, so he got a Journey tribute band." As Cobra Verde begins performing "Waiting for a Girl Like You," Seth admits that he knows the band on stage is a Foreigner tribute – but that he got them, because "Journey sucks."

In a diary chronicling the event for Cleveland daily newspaper The Plain Dealer, Petkovic recalled going to wardrobe the day before the taping:

"The wardrobe supervisor shows us racks of '80s threads, from trench coats to those floppy boots seen in Flock of Seagulls videos. She pulls out a photo of Foreigner from its trench-coat era. See, we're thinking something like this," she says, "something rock 'n' roll, like Joey Ramone."

Frank: "I thought the Ramones and Foreigner were on opposite sides."

John: "I don't think it matters in Hollywood."

By 7 p.m., we're back in our own clothes partying in a retro Hollywood hole-in-the-wall. The bartender looks like a white Fred Sanford.

True Blood

Cobra Verde's version of "Play With Fire" (Copycat Killers, 2005) was featured on the HBO vampire drama True Blood ("Burning House of Love", which aired October 19, 2008.) The song became a favorite among True Blood fans and spawned a number of home-made vampire- and sex-themed videos on YouTube. It also appeared on the 2009 album True Blood – Music from the HBO Original Series. Pitchfork called the song "a stunning surprise, transformed into a beatnik drum circle and injected with Nick Cave-level creepiness" The Houston Press called it "sinister, there can be no doubt, never quite delivering on a horrifying end, but leaving you certain that somewhere past the end of the song someone is going to end up in a ditch."

== Discography ==
Albums

- Viva la Muerte (Scat Records, 1994)
- Vintage Crime EP (Scat Records, 1995)
- Egomania (Scat Records, 1997)
- Nightlife (Motel Records, 1999)
- Easy Listening (MuscleTone Records, 2003)
- Copycat Killers (Scat Records, 2005)
- Haven't Slept All Year (Scat Records, 2008)
- True Blood (Elektra, 2009)

Singles

- One Step Away from Myself/Everything to You (Sub Pop; 1996)
- Leather/A Story I Can Sell (Scat; 1996)
- The Great Dominions (Carcrashh; 1996)
- Terrorist (Wabana; 1997)
- Blood on the Moon (Wabana; 1997)
- For My Woman (Get Hip; 1997)
