= Nightlife (Cobra Verde album) =

Studio album by Cobra Verde
- Released: August 31, 1999
- Recorded: 609 Recording in Bedford, Ohio
- Genre: Alternative rock
- Length: 53:49
- Label: Motel
- Producer: Cobra Verde

Cobra Verde chronology
Egomania (Love Songs) (1997)	Nightlife (1999)	Easy Listening (2003)

Professional ratings
Review scores
Source	Rating
AllMusic	4/5 stars
Robert Christgau	(1-star Honorable Mention)

Nightlife is an album by Cobra Verde, released in 1999 through Motel Records.

== Production ==
The album was recorded by frontman John Petkovic and bass player Don Depew. Ralph Carney played saxophone on "Crashing in a Plane".

== Critical reception ==
The Washington Post called the album "a glam-revival romp that invokes the spirit of David Bowie, Roxy Music and (in the closing 'Pontius Pilate') Kurt Weill and Bertolt Brecht." The Cleveland Scene wrote that "Nightlife has all the flavor of classic rock and roll without sounding too obviously retro."

Exclaim! thought that "Huey Lewis-like sax-rock spews forth on 'What Makes A Man A Man', and [the band's] new grasp on glam bleeds through on cuts like 'Casino'." The Washington City Paper praised the "literate, smart-aleck lyrics." Salon deemed the album "a tight, heavy, guitar-and-chirping-synth version of glam rock written sideways."

== Track listing ==
All tracks are written by Cobra Verde.

No.	Title	Length
1.	"One Step Away from Myself"	3:07
2.	"Conflict"	3:23
3.	"Crashing in a Plane"	4:41
4.	"Every God for Himself"	3:48
5.	"Casino"	4:28
6.	"What Makes a Man a Man"	2:52
7.	"Between the Seasons"	4:30
8.	"Heaven in the Gutter"	3:21
9.	"Don't Let Me Love You"	3:47
10.	"Tourist"	3:22
11.	"Back to Venus"	3:37
12.	"Don't Burden Me with Dreams"	4:07
13.	"$2 Souvenir"	5:15
14.	"Pontius Pilate"	3:31

== Personnel ==
Cobra Verde

- Don Depew – bass guitar, guitar, recording
- Doug Gillard – guitar, keyboards, vocals
- John Petkovic – vocals, guitar, keyboards

Production and additional personnel

- Cobra Verde – production
