= Lost Planets & Phantom Voices =

Studio album by Tobin Sprout
- Released: 2003
- Genres: Indie, Lo-fi
- Label: Recordhead

Tobin Sprout chronology
Let's Welcome the Circus People (1999)	Lost Planets & Phantom Voices (2003)	The Bluebirds Of Happiness Tried To Land On My Shoulder (2010)

Lost Planets & Phantom Voices is the 4th solo album by Guided by Voices songwriter and guitarist Tobin Sprout released in 2003.

== Reception ==
Professional ratings
Review scores
Source	Rating
Pitchfork	6.0/10 stars

CMJ New Music Monthly said, "Most of the disc's 13 tracks are overdubbed one-man affairs from Sprout's upstate Michigan home studio, a rudimentary drum machine reinforcing a lo-fi vibe. This sketchbook approach yields a handful of highlights. The dynamics of Lost Planets expand noticeably when Sprout interacts with sidemen, creating standouts like the cryptic, entrancing "Doctor #8."

== Track listing ==
1. "Indian Ink" – 1:55
2. "Doctor #8" – 2:29
3. "Catch The Sun" – 2:30
4. "All Those Things We've Done" – 3:04
5. "Martini" – 3:30
6. "Rub Your Buddah Tummy" – 3:15
7. "Courage The Tack" – 3:13
8. "Earth Links" – 2:06
9. "As Lovely As You" – 2:50
10. "Shirley The Rainbow" – 2:49
11. "Fortunes Theme No: 1" – 1:52
12. "Cleansing From The Storm" – 4:27
13. "Let Go of My Beautiful Balloon" – 6:01
