= The Bluebirds of Happiness Tried to Land on My Shoulder =

Studio album by Tobin Sprout
- Released: 2010
- Genre: Indie, Lo-fi
- Label: Moonflower Records

Tobin Sprout chronology
Lost Planets & Phantom Voices (2003)	The Bluebirds of Happiness Tried to Land on My Shoulder (2010)	The Universe & Me (2017)

The Bluebirds of Happiness Tried to Land on My Shoulder is the fifth solo album by Guided by Voices member Tobin Sprout, released in 2010. The name references the "bluebird of happiness" idiom.

== Track listing ==
Side A

1. "Pretty" – 2:48
2. "She's on Mercury" – 2:59
3. "Apple of My Eye" – 3:54
4. "You Make My World Go Down" – 2:45
5. "Wedding Song" – 3:40

Side B

1. "Soul Superman" – 2:19
2. "It's Just the Way" – 3:19
3. "Casubury Bridge" – 3:55
4. "Fix on the Races" – 5:28
5. "Field in May" – 3:28
