= Carnival Boy =

Studio album by Tobin Sprout
- Released: September 10, 1996
- Recorded: Cro-Magnon Studio, Dayton, Ohio and Tobin Sprout's house.
- Genre: Indie, pop
- Label: Matador
- Producer: Tobin Sprout

Tobin Sprout chronology
Carnival Boy (1996)	Moonflower Plastic (1997)

Carnival Boy is the debut solo album by the former Guided by Voices member Tobin Sprout, released in 1996.

== Production ==
The album was produced by Sprout. "The Bone Yard" is an instrumental track. GBV's Kevin Fennell played drums on the album; Sprout played all of the other instruments.

== Critical reception ==
Professional ratings
Review scores
Source	Rating
AllMusic	4/5 stars
Entertainment Weekly	A−
NME	7/10

Entertainment Weekly called the album "more carefully crafted and compositionally linear but no less infectious" than Robert Pollard's Not in My Airforce, released at the same time. Rolling Stone deemed it "a collection of 14 pristinely crafted baubles, all in the manner of GBV's trippy, hard pop ... Of the two solo albums, Carnival Boy feels more vital, possibly because Sprout's musical voice isn't as familiar as Pollard's." Newsday thought that "the album's disposition goes from plaintive folksiness ('Gas Daddy Gas'), which gives way to a rave-up punker ('White Flyer') and back to a wistful bucketful of excuses ('I Didn't Know')."

AllMusic wrote that "even though Sprout has a bit more focus than Pollard, Carnival Boy is still hit-and-miss, featuring as many rough pop gems as outright duds, but it does confirm that he is a talented songwriter in his own right." The Chicago Reader deemed the album "mellow, sentimental pop."

== Track listing ==
1. "The Natural Alarm" – 2:59
2. "Cooler Jocks" – 1:16
3. "E's Navy Blue" – 2:43
4. "The Bone Yard" – 1:17
5. "Carnival Boy" – 2:48
6. "Martin's Mounted Head " – 2:17
7. "Gas Daddy Gas" – 2:20
8. "To My Beloved Martha" – 2:09
9. "White Flyer" – 1:43
10. "I Didn't Know" – 2:33
11. "Gallant Men" – 1:26
12. "It's Like Soul Man" – 2:34
13. "Hermit Stew" – 2:01
14. "The Last Man Well Known to Kingpin" – 2:23
