= Sweet Apple =

American rock band

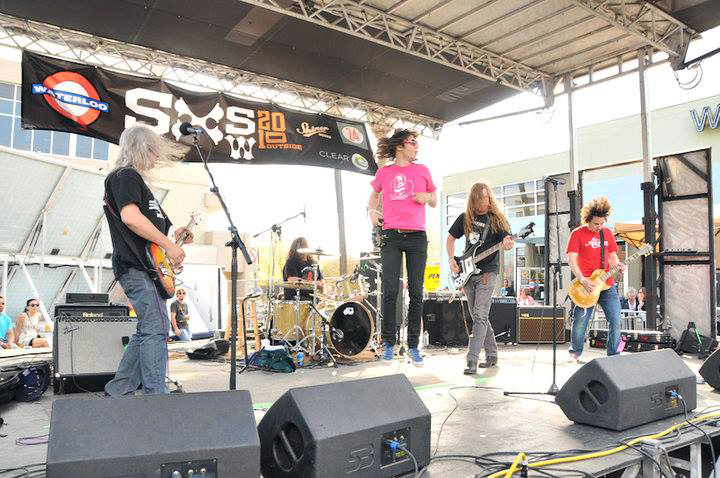
- Sweet Apple live at Waterloo Records in Austin, Texas, March 19, 2010. From left, J Mascis, Mark Klein, John Petkovic, Dave Sweetapple and Tim Parnin.

Background information
- Genres: Indie rock; alternative rock
- Years active: 2010–present
- Labels: Tee Pee; Valley King; Damaged Goods; Outer Battery; Tym
- Members: John Petkovic; Tim Parnin; J Mascis
- Website: sweetapplesongs.com

Sweet Apple is an American rock band formed in 2010.

The group features members of Cobra Verde (singer-guitarist John Petkovic and guitarist Tim Parnin), Dinosaur Jr. (guitarist-drummer J Mascis) and Witch (Mascis, bassist Dave Sweetapple).

The band's music has been described as power-pop, garage, post-punk, psychedelic and hard-rock. Sweet Apple has been called an "indie supergroup." Petkovic, in an interview with Rolling Stone, described the group as "almost like a clubhouse," to explain the various guests that have appeared on the band's recordings, including Mark Lanegan and Robert Pollard (whom Petkovic played with in Guided by Voices).

Sweet Apple has released five 7-inch singles and three albums, including "Sing the Night in Sorrow". "Sing the Night in Sorrow" is the follow-up to Sweet Apple's 2014 album, "The Golden Age of Glitter," which was hailed by Mojo, Esquire, NPR, Rolling Stone and USA Today. The quartet has also released a number of music videos.

The members of Sweet Apple reside in three different locations: Cleveland; Amherst, Massachusetts; and Brattleboro, Vermont. The distance separating the members made practice impossible and resulted in the band's first live performance doubling as its first practice. Sweet Apple's debut occurred on March 18, 2010, at Threadgill's in Austin, Texas—at the invitation of Roky Erickson, for the psychedelic legend's 8th Annual Ice Cream Social at South by Southwest.

The Austin Chronicle, writing about the event, "a Detroit-rock style outfit Sweet Apple was as immediate and memorable as the free ice cream."

In early August 2024, bassist Dave Sweetapple died at the age of 58.

== History ==
=== Formation ===
The origins of Sweet Apple go back to a road trip Petkovic took in late 2007, following the death of his mother. "I really didn't have a destination," Petkovic told The Chicago Tribune, in a 2010 interview. "I just wanted to drive, smoke cigarettes and listen to music." "I couldn't believe he was driving around aimlessly," said Sweetapple, according to the band's label Tee Pee Records. "When I found out he was so close to Vermont I told him to come over." Sweetapple also called their mutual friend J. Mascis, who lives nearby in Amherst, Massachusetts, and told him to come over. He did, and told John to start writing a bunch of songs when he got back home - "so they could start a band."

Mascis had played guitar in Cobra Verde, touring with the band and appearing on its 2003 album, "Easy Listening." Petkovic played bass live with J Mascis + the Fog and sang on the 2002 album, "Free So Free." They met in 1986, when Petkovic was playing a show in Hoboken, New Jersey with Death of Samantha, a band that was label-mates with Dinosaur Jr on Homestead Records. Sweetapple and Petkovic met in the mid-1990s. Sweetapple befriended Mascis during the recording of "Free So Free," at Mascis' home studio in Amherst, Massachusetts.

Parnin, who also plays with Petkovic in Cobra Verde and is the co-owner of a music store in Cleveland, Guitar Riot, joined to play guitar. Parnin and Petkovic started recording "Love and Desperation" in Cleveland with Michael Seifert, who has recorded Bone Thugs-n-Harmony, Tori Amos and Fountains of Wayne. Mascis and Sweetapple added guitar, bass, drums and backing vocal parts in studios on Western Massachusetts.

While the band had a completed album and a label to release it on, it still had not settled on a name. Mascis initially suggested Heavy Blanket, a name he would later use for a side project. The band settled on Sweet Apple. "J. thought it would make Dave feel uncomfortable," recalls Petkovic. "He'll say, 'Hi, I'm Dave from Sweet Apple and they'll be, 'What? I thought you said your name was Dave Sweetapple.'"

=== Love and Desperation ===
On April 20, 2010, Sweet Apple released their first studio album, Love and Desperation.

website	rating
allmusic.com	7/10
drownedinsound.com	6/10
discogs.com	4.1/5
metacritic.com	69%

Most reviews were positive, as Metacritic describes it as:

"excellent listening."

and AllMusic's Mark Demming describes it as:

" a rousing success"

Love and Desperation consisted of 12 songs and a total running time of 39 minutes and 15 seconds.

=== The Golden Age Of Glitter ===
On 8 April 2014, Sweet Apple released their second studio album,The Golden Age Of Glitter. It received mostly positive reviews:

website	
www.allmusic.com	8/10
www.sputnikmusic.com	3/5
www.metacritic.com	81%
