= Same Place the Fly Got Smashed =

Studio album by Guided by Voices
- Released: February 21, 1990
- Recorded: 1990
- Studio: Robert Pollard's home studio (Dayton, Ohio)
- Genres: Indie rock; lo-fi; post-punk
- Length: 31:52
- Label: Rocket #9
- Producers: Greg Demos; Robert Pollard

Guided by Voices chronology
Self-Inflicted Aerial Nostalgia (1989)	Same Place the Fly Got Smashed (1990)	Propeller (1992)

Professional ratings
Review scores
Source	Rating
Allmusic	3/5 stars

Same Place the Fly Got Smashed is the fourth album by American indie rock band Guided by Voices.

In James Greer's book, Guided by Voices: A Brief History: Twenty-One Years of Hunting Accidents in the Forests of Rock and Roll, band leader Robert Pollard cites this album as having some of his best songs, describing "Pendulum" as "my favorite lyrics I've ever written."

== Lyrics and music ==
The sample "You brought me down, you and your family. I did not!" used at the beginning of "Airshow '88" came from the movie Shattered Dreams. The made-for-TV movie came out in 1990, which starred Lindsay Wagner. Frontman Robert Pollard describes the release as "a concept album [with] a linear story" about an alcoholic who commits a murder and is eventually executed for his crime. Same Place the Fly Got Smashed continues the beginning of the band's lo-fi era, featuring a production value markedly less crisp and clear than their previous releases.

== Track listing ==
All songs written by Jim Pollard and Robert Pollard unless otherwise noted.

=== Side A ===
1. "Airshow '88" – 2:12
2. "Order for the New Slave Trade" (R. Pollard) – 3:09
3. "The Hard Way" – 2:53
4. "Drinker's Peace" (R. Pollard) – 1:52
5. "Mammoth Cave" – 2:17
6. "When She Turns 50" (R. Pollard) – 2:07
7. "Club Molluska" – 1:35

=== Side B ===
8. "Pendulum" – 1:49
9. "Ambergris" – 0:52
10. "Local Mix-Up" (R. Pollard) – 4:40
11. "Murder Charge" – 2:12
12. "Starboy" (Greg Demos, R. Pollard) – 1:10
13. "Blatant Doom Trip" – 3:59
14. "How Loft I Am?" (R. Pollard) – 1:05

== Personnel ==
Guided by Voices

- Robert Pollard – lead vocals, guitar
- Jim Pollard – guitar
- Greg Demos – bass, guitar (track 10)
- Don Thrasher – drums
- Tobin Sprout – guitar (track 13)

=== Technical ===
- Ken Martin – mastering
