= Let's Welcome the Circus People =

Studio album by Tobin Sprout
- Released: 1999
- Genres: Indie, Lo-fi
- Label: Wigwam

Tobin Sprout chronology
Moonflower Plastic (1997)	Let's Welcome the Circus People (1999)	Lost Planets & Phantom Voices (2003)

Professional ratings
Review scores
Source	Rating
AllMusic	4/5 stars
The Tampa Tribune	2.5/4 stars

Let's Welcome the Circus People is an album by the Guided by Voices member Tobin Sprout, released in 1999.

== Production ==
Jim Eno plays drums on three of the album's songs.

== Critical reception ==
Newsday wrote that the album "falls under the sway of a Beatles-meets-Pavement pop resonance." CMJ New Music Monthly said, "Tobin Sprout has proven himself a master of basement-bred lo-fi pop-rock. Let's Welcome The Circus People shows Sprout retreating a little bit further into the dark corners of his basement. Sprout's new work is a bit less bouncy, with some more sluggish tempos and obscured vocals."

== Track listing ==
1. "Smokey Joe's Perfect Hair" – 3.40
2. "Digging Up Wooden Teeth" – 3.57
3. "Mayhem Stone" – 2.23
4. "And So On" – 2.03
5. "Making A Garden" – 2.49
6. "Vertical Insect (The Lights Are On)" – 2.22
7. "Maid To Order" – 3.56
8. "Liquor Bag" – 2.47
9. "Who's Adolescence" – 2.08
10. "Lucifer's Flaming Hour" – 3.25
11. "100% Delay" – 2.29
12. "And Then The Crowd Showed Up" – 3.05
