= Prisonshake =

Indie rock band formed in 1986 in Cleveland, Ohio

- Origin: Cleveland, Ohio
- Genres: Indie rock
- Years active: 1986–2008
- Labels: Scat
- Past members: Chris Burgess, Doug Enkler, Robert Griffin, Scott Pickering

Prisonshake was an indie rock band originally formed in Cleveland, Ohio in 1986 by Robert Griffin and Scott Pickering. Their first album was the box set I'm Really Fucked Now, which was released in 1990. This album combined a CD, vinyl LP, cassette, and 7" single, and is about three hours in duration. In 1993, the band released the album Roaring Third, which was their last album until Dirty Moons, a double album, was released in August 2008. In December 1994, the band relocated to St. Louis, Missouri, when Griffin moved there. On September 20, 2008, the band headlined a concert at the Grog Shop in Cleveland Heights, which the Cleveland Plain Dealer described as "a homecoming of sorts for the group".

== Discography ==
- I'm Really Fucked Now (Scat box set, 1990)
- Della Street (Scat EP, 1991)
- The Roaring Third (Scat, 1993)
- Dirty Moons (Scat, 2008)
