= Sandbox (Guided by Voices album) =

Studio album by Guided by Voices
- Released: September 1, 1987
- Recorded: Mid-1987
- Studios: Steve Wilbur's 8 Track Garage, Dayton, Ohio, US
- Genre: Indie rock
- Length: 27:11
- Language: English
- Label: Halo
- Producers: Guided by Voices (Kevin Fennell, Mitch Mitchell, Jim Pollard, and Robert Pollard); Steve Wilbur

Guided by Voices chronology
Devil Between My Toes (1987)	Sandbox (1987)	Self-Inflicted Aerial Nostalgia (1989)

Sandbox is the second studio album from American indie rock band Guided by Voices.

== Reception ==
Editors at AllMusic rated this album 2 out of 5 stars, with critic Brian Egan writing that the band "took a short step back" from their previous album and that the songs "ultimately fail to register". Byron Coley of Spin pointed to the work on Sandbox to declare that Guided by Voices is "one of the sharpest sounding angle-pop bands out of the Midwest since the days of Green". In that publication's 1995 album guide, they rated Sandbox a 1 out of 10, stating that the album stood out for being "particularly unlistenable" among the band's "remarkably poor" early works and comparing its sound to "Greg Kihn or somebody."

In 1995, frontman Robert Pollard called this album "an attempt to make a huge power-pop record for less than a thousand dollars." Meanwhile, journalist David Sprague reported that this album was painful for him to listen to.

== Track listing ==
1. "Lips of Steel" (Kevin Fennell, Mitch Mitchell, and Jim Pollard) – 1:34
2. "A Visit to the Creep Doctor" (Robert Pollard) – 1:30
3. "Everyday" (R. Pollard) – 2:58
4. "Barricade" (R. Pollard) – 4:32
5. "Get to Know the Ropes" (R. Pollard) – 3:48
6. "Can't Stop" (J. Pollard, R. Pollard) – 2:26
7. "The Drinking Jim Crow" (R. Pollard) – 1:36
8. "Trap Soul Door" (Mitchell and R. Pollard) – 1:15
9. "Common Rebels" (Fennell, Mitchell, and J. Pollard) – 2:04
10. "Long Distance Man" (R. Pollard) – 1:17
11. "I Certainly Hope Not" (R. Pollard) – 2:01
12. "Adverse Wind" (R. Pollard) – 2:09

== Personnel ==
Guided by Voices

- Kevin Fennell – drums, production
- Mitch Mitchell – bass guitar, production
- Jim Pollard – guitar, production
- Robert Pollard – guitar, vocals, production

Additional personnel

- Mark Greenwald – artwork
- Alan Moy – mastering at Masterdisk
- Steve Wilbur – guitar on "Barricade" and "Can't Stop", production

== See also ==
- List of 1987 albums
