= Tower in the Fountain of Sparks =

Studio album by Airport 5
- Released: 2001
- Genre: Alternative rock, indie, Lo-fi
- Label: Fading Captain Series

Airport 5 chronology
Tower in the Fountain of Sparks (2001)	Life Starts Here (2002)

Professional ratings
Review scores
Source	Rating
AllMusic	2.5/5 stars

Tower in the Fountain of Sparks is the first studio album by the rock band Airport 5. It was released in 2001.

== Track listing ==
All songs written by Robert Pollard and Tobin Sprout except where noted.

1. "Burns Carpenter, Man Of Science" – 3.40
2. "Total Exposure" – 4.08
3. "Subatomic Rain" – 2.52
4. "One More" – 2.55
5. "Mission Experiences" – 1.31
6. "The Cost Of Shipping Cattle" – 4.51
7. "Circle Of Trim" – 2.39
8. "War & Wedding" – 2.15
9. "Stifled Man Casino" – 3.21
10. "Up The Nails" – 3.37
11. "Tomorrow You May Rise" – 1.05
12. "Feathering Clueless (The Exotic Freebird)" – 3.02
13. "Mansfield On The Sky" – 3.37
14. "White Car Creek" – 1.02 (written by Tobin Sprout)
15. "Remain Lodging (At Airport 5)" – 3.44
