= Vampire on Titus =

- The image on the cover is a Vegetable Lamb of Tartary from The Travels of Sir John Mandeville by John Mandeville, 1499.

Studio album by Guided by Voices
- Released: July 1, 1993
- Recorded: 1993
- Studios: Steve Wilbur's home studio (Dayton, Ohio); Tobin Sprout's home studio (Dayton, Ohio)
- Genres: Indie rock; lo-fi
- Length: 30:42
- Label: Scat
- Producers: Steve Wilbur; Tobin Sprout

Guided by Voices chronology
Propeller (1992)	Vampire on Titus (1993)	Bee Thousand (1994)

Professional ratings
Review scores
Source	Rating
Allmusic	3.5/5 stars

Vampire on Titus is the sixth studio album by American indie rock band Guided by Voices, released on July 1, 1993. It was their first album released through Scat Records.

== Background ==
Vampire on Titus was recorded after a short-lived dissolution of the band (after 1992's "farewell" album Propeller) but prior to the full-time regrouping that occurred with the assemblage of the Bee Thousand album and the band's return to live performance. The album was recorded with a skeletal line-up consisting of Robert Pollard, Jim Pollard and Tobin Sprout. Jim Shepard of V-3 remarked to Pollard once that he “was like a vampire on Titus, sucking songs out of the earth.” Pollard lived on Titus Ave. in Dayton, Ohio. The album is often acknowledged as being the most abrasively lo-fi in the entire Guided by Voices catalog.

== Track listing ==
All songs written by Robert Pollard unless otherwise noted.

Vampire on Titus track listing
No.	Title	Writer(s)	Length
1.	""Wished I Was A Giant""		2:43
2.	"#2 in the Model Home Series"	R. Pollard, Tobin Sprout	1:45
3.	"Expecting Brainchild"	Jim Pollard, R. Pollard	2:30
4.	"Superior Sector Janitor X"	J. Pollard, R. Pollard, Sprout	0:37
5.	"Donkey School"	Sprout	1:03
6.	"Dusted"		2:08
7.	"Marchers in Orange"	J. Pollard, R. Pollard	1:24
8.	"Sot"	Sprout, R. Pollard	2:35
9.	"World of Fun"		0:55
10.	"Jar of Cardinals"		1:22
11.	"Unstable Journey"		2:15
12.	"E-5"	J. Pollard, R. Pollard, Sprout	1:29
13.	"Cool Off Kid Kilowatt"	J. Pollard, R. Pollard, Sprout	0:56
14.	"Gleemer (The Deeds of Fertile Jim)"	Sprout	2:24
15.	"Wondering Boy Poet"	R. Pollard, Sprout	0:59
16.	"What About It?"		1:37
17.	"Perhaps Now the Vultures"		2:23
18.	"Non-Absorbing"		1:37
Total length:			30:42

== Personnel ==
=== Guided by Voices ===
- Robert Pollard – vocals, guitars, drums
- Jim Pollard – guitars
- Tobin Sprout – vocals, guitars, bass guitar

=== Technical ===
- Bruce Greenwald – photography
- John Mandeville – cover artwork
