= Hardcore UFOs: Revelations, Epiphanies and Fast Food in the Western Hemisphere =

Box set by Guided by Voices
- Released: November 4, 2003
- Recorded: 1986–2003
- Genre: Rock, lo-fi, indie rock
- Label: Matador Records

Guided by Voices chronology
Earthquake Glue (2003)	Hardcore UFOs: Revelations, Epiphanies and Fast Food in the Western Hemisphere (2003)	Half Smiles of the Decomposed (2004)

Guided by Voices Box Set chronology
Suitcase (2000)	Hardcore UFOs (2003)	Suitcase 2 (2005)

Professional ratings
Review scores
Source	Rating
Allmusic	link
Pitchfork Media	(8.5/10) link

Hardcore UFOs: Revelations, Epiphanies and Fast Food in the Western Hemisphere is an anthology box set released by Guided by Voices in 2003.

== Track listing ==
=== Disc 1: Human Amusements at Hourly Rates ===
The first disc is The Best of Guided by Voices: Human Amusements at Hourly Rates, which was also released separately at the same time as Hardcore UFOs. However, this edition of the album differs slightly as it includes the original album versions of "Game Of Pricks" and "Motor Away" rather than the re-recorded single versions, which both appear on Disc 2 of the boxed set, as well as the 7" version of "I Am A Scientist". It also arranges the tracks chronologically.

1. "Captain's Dead" – 2:01
2. "Drinker's Peace" – 1:50
3. "Exit Flagger" – 2:18
4. "14 Cheerleader Coldfront" – 1:31
5. "Shocker in Gloomtown" – 1:25
6. "Non-Absorbing" – 1:35
7. "Tractor Rape Chain" – 3:04
8. "Hot Freaks" – 1:43
9. "Echos Myron" – 2:38
10. "I Am a Scientist" [7" Version] – 2:29
11. "A Salty Salute" – 1:29
12. "Watch Me Jumpstart" – 2:25
13. "Game of Pricks" – 1:34
14. "Motor Away" – 2:06
15. "Hit" – 0:23
16. "My Valuable Hunting Knife" – 2:01
17. "Cut"-Out Witch – 3:05
18. "The Official Ironmen Rally Song" – 2:49
19. "To Remake the Young Flyer" – 1:43
20. "I Am A Tree" – 4:40
21. "Bulldog Skin" – 3:00
22. "Learning To Hunt" – 2:24
23. "Teenage FBI" [Original Version] – 1:38
24. "Things I Will Keep" – 2:25
25. "Surgical Focus" – 3:46
26. "Chasing Heather Crazy" – 2:53
27. "Twilight Campfighter" – 3:08
28. "Glad Girls" – 3:49
29. "Back to the Lake" – 2:34
30. "Everywhere with Helicopter" – 2:37
31. "My Kind of Soldier" – 2:36
32. "The Best of Jill Hives" – 2:38

=== Disc 2: Demons and Painkillers ===
The second disc is Demons and Painkillers: Matador Out-of-Print Singles, B-Sides & Compilation Tracks.

1. "Motor Away" [7" Version] – 2:16
2. "Color of My Blade" – 2:24
3. "My Valuable Hunting Knife" [7" Version] – 2:26
4. "Game of Pricks" [7" Version] – 2:16
5. "Mice Feel Nice" (in My Room) – 2:18
6. "Not Good for the Mechanism" – 2:00
7. "Kiss Only the Important Ones" – 1:27
8. "Dodging Invisible Rays" – 2:37
9. "Deaf Ears" – 1:58
10. "Why Did You Land?" – 2:15
11. "June Salutes You!" – 1:53
12. "Delayed Reaction Brats" – 1:07
13. "He's the Uncle" – 1:39
14. "Key Losers" – 2:14
15. "Postal Blowfish" [New Version] – 2:14
16. "Unleashed! The Large-Hearted Boy" [Live] – 1:56
17. "Some Drilling Implied" [Live] – 1:26
18. "Systems Crash" – 1:19
19. "Catfood on the Earwig" – 2:27
20. "The Who vs. Porky Pig" – 2:00
21. "A Life in Finer Clothing" – 1:29
22. "The Worryin' Song" – 1:02
23. "Subtle Gear Shifting" – 3:44
24. "Finks" – 2:28
25. "The Finest Joke Is Upon Us" – 3:10
26. "The Singing Razorblade" – 2:13
27. "Now to War" [Electric Version] – 2:28
28. "Mannequin's Complaint (Wax Dummy Meltdown)" – 3:21
29. "Do They Teach You the Chase?" – 1:12
30. "(I'll Name You) The Flame That Cries" – 3:18
31. "The Ascended Master's Grogshop" – 0:53
32. "My Thoughts Are a Gas" – 3:05
33. "Running Off with the Fun City Girls" – 2:01
34. "None of Them Any Good" – 2:59
35. "Choking Tara" [Creamy Version] – 2:15

=== Disc 3: Delicious Pie & Thank You for Calling ===
The third disc is Delicious Pie & Thank You for Calling: Previously Unreleased Songs and Recordings.

1. "I" – 1:09
2. "Back to Saturn X" – 4:52
3. "H-O-M-E" – 2:41
4. "You're the Special" – 1:32
5. "Perhaps We Were Swinging" – 1:52
6. "Mother & Son" – 2:33
7. "7 Strokes to Heaven's Edge" – 1:54
8. "Fire 'Em Up, Abner" – 3:32
9. "Harboring Exiles" – 1:52
10. "Still Worth Nothing" – 2:36
11. "Never" – 2:53
12. "Slave Your Beetle Brain" – 1:59
13. "It Is Divine" [Different Version] – 3:47
14. "They" – 1:41
15. "I Invented the Moonwalk (and the Pencil Sharpener)" [Do the Collapse Demo] – 2:08
16. "Fly into Ashes" [Do the Collapse Demo] – 2:24
17. "The Various Vaults of Convenience" [Do the Collapse Demo] – 2:16
18. "Trashed Aircraft" [Do the Collapse Demo] – 2:15
19. "Running Off with the Fun City Girls" [Mag Earwhig! Demo] – 2:14
20. "Bulldog Skin" [Mag Earwhig! Demo] – 2:24
21. "Portable Men's Society" [Mag Earwhig! Demo] – 4:04
22. "Choking Tara" [Mag Earwhig! Demo] – 2:24
23. "Man Called Aerodynamics" [Concert For Todd Version] – 2:10

=== Disc 4: Live at the Wheelchair Races ===
The fourth disc is Live at the Wheelchair Races: Unreleased Live Recordings 1995–2002.

1. Intro by Randy Campbell – 0:32
2. "Little Lines" – 1:55
3. "A Salty Salute" – 1:45
4. "I Am Produced" – 2:11
5. "Why Did You Land?" – 2:10
6. "Zap" – 1:10
7. "14 Cheerleader Coldfront" – 1:31
8. "Everywhere with Helicopter" – 2:34
9. "Quicksilver" – 1:06
10. "James Riot" – 2:51
11. "Pretty Bombs" – 3:26
12. "Far-Out Crops" – 2:37
13. "My Impression Now" – 2:08
14. "Look at Them" – 2:21
15. "Melted Pat" – 1:30
16. "How Loft I Am?" – 1:06
17. "King and Caroline/Motor Away" – 4:27
18. "Trap Soul Door" – 1:14
19. "Cheyenne" – 2:51
20. "Make Use" – 3:07
21. "Burning Flag Birthday Suit" – 2:28
22. "Weed King" – 2:37
23. "Town of Mirrors" – 2:45
24. "Over the Neptune/Mesh Gear Fox" – 5:08
25. "Dragons Awake!" – 2:05
26. "Shrine to the Dynamic Years (Athens Time Change Riots)" – 1:48
27. "Game of Pricks" – 2:04
28. "Tractor Rape Chain" – 2:43
29. "Key Losers" – 2:00
30. "Now to War" – 2:15
31. "Johnny Appleseed" – 3:02
32. "Drinker's Peace" – 1:42

=== Disc 5: Forever Since Breakfast ===
The fifth (and final) disc is Forever Since Breakfast: The 1986 Debut EP. This was GBV's first official release.

1. "Land of Danger" – 3:09
2. "Let's Ride" – 3:26
3. "Like I Do" – 2:42
4. "Sometimes I Cry" – 3:03
5. "She Wants to Know" – 3:15
6. "Fountain of Youth" – 3:59
7. "The Other Place" – 3:34
