= Forever Since Breakfast =

EP by Guided by Voices
- Released: 1986
- Recorded: 1986
- Studio: Group Effort Studios (Crescent Springs, Kentucky)
- Genre: Indie rock
- Label: I Wanna
- Producer: Wayne Hartman

Guided by Voices EP chronology
Forever Since Breakfast (1986)	The Grand Hour (1993)

Professional ratings
Review scores
Source	Rating
AllMusic	2.5/5.0 stars

Forever Since Breakfast is the first release by American indie rock band Guided by Voices, released on vinyl in 1986. In contrast to the lo-fi sound they would cultivate in the coming years, this EP was recorded in a professional studio, and features a nearly slick sound that anticipates their late 1990s major-label efforts. Robert Pollard, the band's driving force, has since derided the EP's sound as sterile. Like much of their early output, the songs featured bear a prominent college rock influence, particularly from R.E.M..

The title comes from an interview of Charles Manson on Tom Snyder's Tomorrow. When asked how old he was, Manson answered, "Um, forever. Since breakfast... I can't remember."

The record was first released on CD as part of 2003's Hardcore UFOs box set, and was reissued on vinyl in 2005. It was introduced to streaming services in 2023.

== Track listing ==
1. "Land of Danger" – 3:09
2. "Let's Ride" – 3:26
3. "Like I Do" – 2:42
4. "Sometimes I Cry" – 3:03
5. "She Wants to Know" – 3:15
6. "Fountain of Youth" – 3:59
7. "The Other Place" – 3:34

== Personnel ==
=== Guided by Voices ===
- Robert Pollard – vocals, guitar
- Mitch Mitchell – bass guitar
- Paul Comstock – guitar
- Mitch Swan – guitar
- Various – drums

=== Technical ===
- Pete Jamison – photography
- Chuck Madden – mastering
- Robert Pollard – cover artwork
- Wayne Hartman – engineer
