= Suitcase: Failed Experiments and Trashed Aircraft =

Box set by Guided by Voices
- Released: September 19, 2000
- Recorded: 1975–1998
- Genre: Rock, lo-fi, indie rock
- Label: Fading Captain Series

Guided by Voices chronology
Do the Collapse (1999)	Suitcase: Failed Experiments and Trashed Aircraft (2000)	Isolation Drills (2001)

Guided by Voices Box Set chronology
Box (1995)	Suitcase (2000)	Hardcore UFOs (2003)

Suitcase: Failed Experiments and Trashed Aircraft is a four-CD box set released by Guided by Voices in 2000. Named for the reputed literal suitcase in which the bandleader Robert Pollard allegedly stored his hundreds of unreleased tapes, the set is a trawl through decades' worth of material from throughout Guided by Voices' recorded career.

Each song was credited to a fictitious band name. Variously featured are acoustic demos, album session outtakes, live tapes, rehearsals and unfinished tape collage fragments which span from the mid-1970s to 1998. This box set contains Pollard's earliest recorded song, 'little jimmy the giant', which was recorded in 1974.

== Reception ==
Professional ratings
Review scores
Source	Rating
Allmusic	3/5 stars
Pitchfork Media	(7.9/10)

== Track listing ==
Fictitious band names shown in italics.

Disc 1:

1. Styles We Paid For – The Terrible Two – 1:46
2. Standard Generator – Bloodbeast – 1:02
3. Huge On Pluto – The Kissing Life – 2:44
4. Whitey Museum – Bottoms Up! (You Fantastic Bastard) – 3:25
5. (The Amazing) Ben Zing – Tear It Out – 4:27
6. Meat Kingdom Group – Cinnamon Flavored Skulls – 0:35
7. Elf God – Bunco Men – 2:22
8. Judas & The Piledrivers – Bad And Rare – 1:04
9. Eric Pretty – Dorothy's A Planet – 2:15
10. Global Witch Awakening – Pluto The Skate – 1:17
11. Magic Toe – Let's Go Vike – 2:38
12. Hazzard Hotrods – Sabotage – 4:26
13. Tax Revlon – Pink Drink [Demo] – 3:09
14. Champion Hairpuller – James Riot – 2:47
15. Burns Carpenter – It's Easy – 0:46
16. A A Bottom – Dank Star Ground Control – 2:24
17. Crushed Being Groovy – Spring Tigers – 2:08
18. Rex Polaroyd – Born On Seaweed – 2:11
19. Monkey Business – Flesh Ears From June – 1:58
20. Ghetto Blaster – Driving In The U.S. of A. – 1:53
21. Turned On Turner – My Big Day [3 Versions] – 5:55
22. Maxwell Greenfield – Have It Again – 1:02
23. Little Bobby Pop – Little Jimmy The Giant – 1:52
24. Bozo's Octopuss – Taco, Buffalo, Birddog And Jesus – 3:23
25. Mooshoo Wharf – Ding Dong Daddy (Is Back From The Bank) – 0:38

Disc 2:

1. Clinton Killingsworth – Supermarket The Moon – 2:12
2. Stingy Queens – Hold On To Yesterday – 3:19
3. Judy Plus Nine, The – Ha Ha Man [Different Version] – 1:19
4. Nicotine Cranes – Our Value Of Luxury – 2:59
5. Arthur Psycho And The Trippy Warts – Bug House [2 Versions] – 3:43
6. Groovy Lucifer – Rainbow Billy – 1:40
7. Approval Of Mice – Shrine To The Dynamic Years (Athens Time Change Riots) – 1:56
8. Eric Pretty – On Short Wave – 2:48
9. Artrock Unicorns – I Can See It In Your Eyes – 2:12
10. Kuda Labranche – Tobacco's Last Stand – 1:42
11. Elvis Caligula – Shifting Swift Is A Lift – 2:17
12. Tabatha's Flashpot – Sing It Out – 1:11
13. Ricked Wicky – Messenger – 1:54
14. K.C. Turner – The Fool Ticket – 2:24
15. Brown Smoothies – Mallard Smoke – 1:55
16. Edison Shell – Mr. McCaslin Will Sell No More Flowers – 1:26
17. Ceramic Cock Einstein – Shit Midas – 0:55
18. Moonchief – Blue Gil – 2:51
19. Ricked Wicky – Invest In British Steel – 3:49
20. Pearly Gates Smoke Machine – Spinning Around – 2:10
21. 1st Joint – Let's Go! (To War) – 0:47
22. Antler – Grasshopper Rap – 1:27
23. King Of Cincinnati – I'm Cold – 2:41
24. Ghost Fart – Damn Good Mr. Jam [Different Version] – 2:41
25. Ben Zing – In Walked The Moon – 4:08

Disc 3:

1. Fake Organisms – Long Way To Run – 1:38
2. Tom Devil – Mr. Media – 1:24
3. Urinary Track Stars – Settlement Down – 2:59
4. Red Hot Helicopter – Mr. Japan – 1:47
5. Doctor Formula – A Kind Of Love [Live] – 2:52
6. Ben Zing – Meddle – 2:42
7. Hazzard Hotrods – Big Trouble – 7:49
8. Eric Pretty – A Good Circuitry Soldier – 1:38
9. Antler – Devil Doll – 1:05
10. Indian Alarm Clock – Pantherz [Demo] – 2:04
11. Flaming Ray – Cocaine Jane – 0:52
12. Grabbit – Exploding Anthills – 1:39
13. 8th Dwarf – Perch Warble – 1:36
14. Coward Of The Hour – Medley: This View/True Sensation/On The Wall – 3:52
15. Oil Can Harry – What Are We Coming Up To? – 1:56
16. Too Proud To Practice – Scissors And The Clay Ox (In) – 2:58
17. Zeppelin Commander – Cody's Antler – 2:24
18. God's Brother – Once In A While – 2:00
19. Antler – Buzzards And Dreadful Crows [Different Version] – 1:28
20. Kink Zego – Carnival At The Morning Star School – 1:05
21. Royal Japanese Daycare – Cruise [Different Version] – 2:53
22. Stingy Queens – Gayle – 1:17
23. Homosexual Flypaper – Gift – 2:55
24. Fast Forward Life – The Flying Party – 0:55
25. Bus Of Trojan Hope – Trashed Aircraft – 2:16

Disc 4:

1. Pete Eastwood – Trying To Make It Work Again – 1:04
2. Panzee – Turbo Boy – 3:12
3. Unfriendly, The – Chain Wallet Bitch – 0:29
4. King Of Cincinnati – Little Head – 2:19
5. Matted Pelt – Why Did You Land? [Slow Version] – 2:47
6. Ben Zing – Time Machines [Different Version] – 3:11
7. Hazzard Hotrods – A Farewell To Arms – 2:13
8. Jumped Or Pushed? – Best Things Goin' Round – 0:55
9. Good Parts Only Corporation – Sickly Sweet – 1:27
10. Ben Zing – United – 3:51
11. John The Croc – Unshaven Bird – 1:19
12. Go Back Snowball – Black Ghost Pie – 0:50
13. Brown Star Jam – Go For The Answers – 2:19
14. Factory Rat – Rocking Now [Demo] – 1:47
15. God's Brother – Excellent Things – 2:33
16. Antler – Static Airplane Jive – 1:11
17. Fake Organisms – Where I Come From – 2:47
18. Fat Chance – Try To Find You – 2:57
19. Antler – Deaf Ears [Different Version] – 2:06
20. Academy Of Crowsfeet – Good For A Few Laughs – 2:14
21. Nelly & The Dirtfloor – Raphael – 2:59
22. Maxwell Greenfield – My Feet's Trustworthy Existence – 2:29
23. Bravery Umpire – Eggs – 3:24
24. Clinton Killingsworth – Wondering Boy Poet [Piano Version] – 1:08
25. Styles We Paid For – Oh, Blinky – 2:22
