= Self-Inflicted Aerial Nostalgia =

Studio album by Guided by Voices
- Released: 1989
- Recorded: c. late 1980s
- Studio: Steve Wilbur's home, Dayton, Ohio
- Genre: Indie rock; lo-fi
- Length: 37:48
- Label: Halo
- Producer: Guided by Voices

Guided by Voices chronology
Sandbox (1987)	Self-Inflicted Aerial Nostalgia (1989)	Same Place The Fly Got Smashed (1990)

Professional ratings
Review scores
Source	Rating
Allmusic	3/5 stars

Self-Inflicted Aerial Nostalgia is the third album by American indie rock band Guided by Voices. It is considered to be the first album in the group's discography to have their signature sound which was achieved by using low fidelity recording techniques.

It is the only album to feature drummer Bruce Smith.

== Background ==
After the group's previous releases failed commercially, the band's budget towards production began to shrink considerably. 500 original copies were pressed that were funded by the band, similar to previous releases.

== Recording ==
The album was recorded at Steve Wilbur's home using an 8-track recorder.

== Track listing ==
1. "The Future Is in Eggs" (M. Mitchell/J. Pollard/R. Pollard) – 3:29
2. "The Great Blake St. Canoe Race" (R. Pollard) – 2:54
3. "Slopes of Big Ugly" (R. Pollard) – 2:06
4. "Paper Girl" (R. Pollard) – 2:16
5. "Navigating Flood Regions" (R. Pollard) – 2:38
6. "An Earful O' Wax" (R. Pollard) – 4:22
7. "White Whale" (J. Pollard/R. Pollard) – 2:39
8. "Trampoline" (R. Pollard) – 2:12
9. "Short on Posters" (J. Pollard/R. Pollard) – 1:46
10. "Chief Barrel Belly" (R. Pollard) – 3:16
11. "Dying to Try This" (R. Pollard) – 1:17
12. "The Qualifying Remainder" (K. Fennell/M. Mitchell/J. Pollard/R. Pollard) – 2:55
13. "Liar's Tale" (R. Pollard) – 1:57
14. "Radio Show (Trust the Wizard)" (J. Pollard/R. Pollard) – 4:01

== Personnel ==
Guided by Voices

- Robert Pollard – vocals, guitar
- Jim Pollard – guitar
- Peyton Eric – drums
- Steve Wilbur – guitar, bass
- Bruce Smith – drums (track 6)
- Mitch Mitchell – bass
- Kevin Fennell – drums
