= Scat Records =

American record label

- Founded: 1989
- Genre: Indie rock
- Country of origin: U.S.
- Location: Saint Louis, Missouri

Scat Records is a St. Louis, Missouri-based independent record label. It was founded in Cleveland, Ohio, in 1989, and many of the bands released on the label are from Ohio. The label is notable for featuring Guided by Voices, The Mice and Cobra Verde on its roster. Scat Records' owner Robert Griffin himself played in the bands Spike in Vain and Prisonshake. Scat also released a compilation of Cleveland pre-punk.

Griffin discovered Guided by Voices from Matt Sweeney, and their 1994 release Bee Thousand helped launch the band before they signed with Matador Records. Robert Pollard, Guided by Voices frontman and primary songwriter, according to one story, felt vindicated after 10 years at age 35 when he was signed to Scat to release Propeller, and ran up and down Titus Avenue in Dayton, Ohio screaming in jubilation, inspiring the name for the later album Vampire on Titus. Griffin was said to have helped the band find their successful sound as well.

== See also ==
- Scat Records artists
- List of record labels
