= Tobin Sprout =

American artist and musician (born 1955)

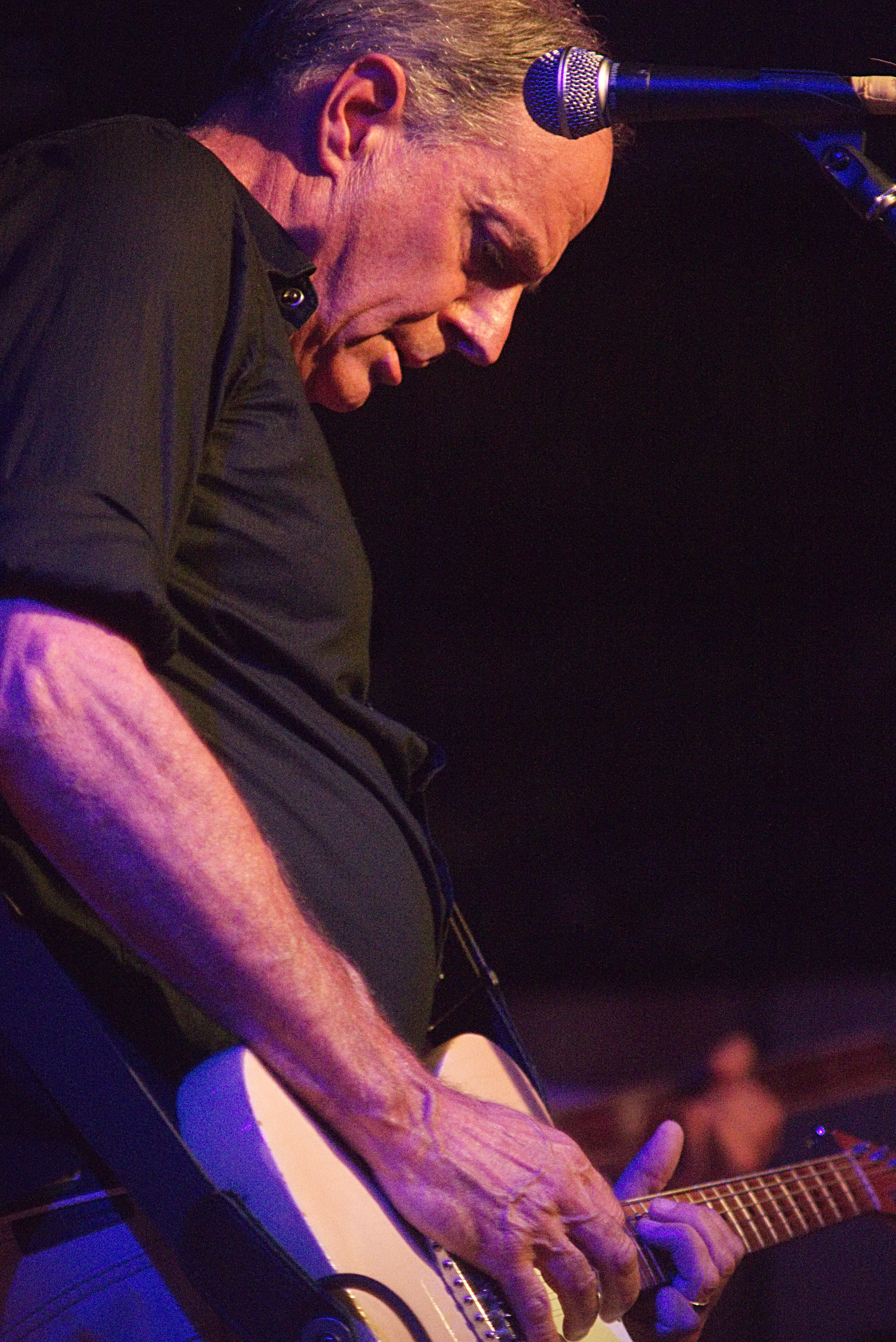

Background information
- Born: Tobin Sprout; April 28, 1955 (age 70)
- Origin: Dayton, Ohio
- Genres: Indie rock; indie pop
- Occupations: Musician; songwriter; visual artist; children's author
- Instruments: Guitar; vocals
- Years active: 1987–present
- Labels: Matador; Merge; Fire; Moonflower Records; Fading Captain Series/Luna
- Formerly of: Guided by Voices; fig.4; Eyesinweasel; Airport 5
- Website: tobinsprout.net

Tobin Sprout (born April 28, 1955) is an American visual artist, musician, songwriter, and children's author. He is most notable as a former member of the indie rock band Guided by Voices. He served as a secondary major songwriter and guitarist of the group from 1987 to 1997 and again from 2010 to 2014. Pitchfork has referred to him as "the AC/DC of lo-fi rock" for his "dogged insistence on sticking to his original strategy" in creating music, ie. "that production values basically don't matter".

He was also a founding member of the band fig.4, who participated in the Dayton new wave scene in the mid 80s.

== Life and career ==
=== Early life ===
Sprout was born in Dayton, Ohio and graduated from Centerville High School in 1974. After graduating from high school, Sprout studied graphic design and illustration at Ohio University.

=== Guided by Voices: 1987–1997 ===
A self-taught musician, Sprout played with and was a major collaborator of the Dayton band Guided By Voices. Employing a four-track recorder and a home studio he contributed to the lo-fi sound of Guided by Voices, and he was a member of the band from 1987 through 1997, and again from 2010 to 2014. The band frequently recorded in Sprout's home studio, and as a member of the band he contributed as a co-writer, multi-instrumentalist and studio engineer. Guided by Voices songs written by Sprout include "It's Like Soul Man," "Awful Bliss," and "Atom Eyes". Between the 1997 split and the 2010 reunion, he appeared on three more Guided by Voices recordings, contributing piano to the Isolation Drills song "How's My Drinking?" and guitar to the Half Smiles of the Decomposed tracks "Girls of Wild Strawberries" and "Huffman Prairie Flying Field".

=== Solo projects and reunions ===
Sprout released Carnival Boy in 1996, Moonflower Plastic in 1997 and Let's Welcome the Circus People in 1999. He wrote songs for a project called Eyesinweasel which were collected on 2000's Wrinkled Thoughts. His Demos and Outtakes collection was released in the following year. In 2001, Sprout rejoined with Robert Pollard (of Guided by Voices) to form Airport 5, independently releasing numerous singles and 2 full-length albums, Tower in the Fountain of Sparks and in 2002, Life Starts Here.

His fourth solo effort was Lost Planets & Phantom Voices. In 2010, he released his fifth solo effort, The Bluebirds Of Happiness Tried To Land on My Shoulder, on his personal record label Moonflower Records.

In July 2010, Robert Pollard announced that the "Classic Lineup" of Guided By Voices would reunite for a U.S. tour, with a lineup featuring Pollard, Sprout, Mitch Mitchell, Kevin Fennell, and Greg Demos. The tour culminated with a performance in at Irving Plaza in New York City on New Year's Eve, 2010. They went on to release six new studio albums before splitting up again in 2014.

In 2017, Sprout released his sixth solo effort, The Universe & Me, changing from his personal label to the independent label Burger Records. His seventh solo release, Empty Horses, was released in 2020 with Fire Records.

== Personal life ==
Sprout is also a visual artist. American actor Tim Allen has stated he is a collector and admirer of Sprout's artwork and illustrations.

In 2009, Sprout released his first children's book, Elliott, published by Mackinac Island Press.

== Partial discography ==
=== Solo albums ===
- Carnival Boy (1996)
- Moonflower Plastic (1997)
- Let's Welcome the Circus People (1999)
- Lost Planets & Phantom Voices (2003)
- Live at the Horseshoe Tavern (2004)
- The Bluebirds of Happiness Tried to Land on My Shoulder (2010)
- The Universe & Me (2017)
- Empty Horses (2020)

==== Singles ====
- Popstram (1 Toaster, 2 Sadder Than You, 3 Bottle of the Ghost Of Time – 7") – Recordhead (1995)
- "Let Go Of My Beautiful Balloon" (A Let Go of My Beautiful Balloon, B Shirley The Rainbow – 7", Single) – Wigwam Records (2001)

==== EPs ====
- Wax Nails (1 Get Your Calcium, 2 Cereal Killer, 3 Seed, 4 The Crawling Backward Man, 5 In Good Hands, 6 How's Your House? (Demo) – CD, EP) – Recordhead (1998)
- Untitled – Split with The Minders (1 Can I Have This?, 2 Lust – 7") – Sprite Recordings (2002)
- Sentimental Stations (1 Secret Service, 2 Branding Dennis, 3 I Think You Would, 4 Inside The Blockhouse, 5 Are You Happening?, 6 Doctor No. 8 [Piano Version], 7 Sentimental Stations – CD, EP) – Recordhead (2002)

=== With Eyesinweasel ===
- Demos & Outtakes – (1999)
- Wrinkled Thoughts – (2000)
- Live In The Middle East – (2001)

=== With Airport 5 ===
- Tower in the Fountain of Sparks – (2001)
- Life Starts Here – (2002)

== Publications ==
- Elliott (2009)
- Tinky Puts His Little Moon To Bed (2013)
