= The Crawling Distance =

Studio album by Robert Pollard
- Released: January 20, 2009
- Genre: Rock, indie rock
- Label: Guided by Voices Inc.
- Producer: Todd Tobias

Robert Pollard chronology
| Robert Pollard Is Off to Business (2008) | The Crawling Distance (2009) | Elephant Jokes (2009) |

Professional ratings
Aggregate scores
| Source | Rating |
|---|---|
| Metacritic | 64/100 |
Review scores
| Source | Rating |
| Pitchforkmedia | (2.8/10) |
| PopMatters | 4/5 stars |
| Spin | 3/5 stars |
| The Times | 4/5 stars |

The Crawling Distance is the 11th studio album by singer-songwriter Robert Pollard, released on January 20, 2009. Similar to many of Pollard's releases since Fiction Man in 2004, all instrumentation on the album was performed by producer Todd Tobias.

== Track listing ==
1. "Faking My Harlequin" - 3:46
2. "Cave Zone" - 2:55
3. "Red Cross Vegas Night" - 3:41
4. "The Butler Stands for All of Us" - 3:45
5. "It's Easy" - 4:09
6. "No Island" - 4:49
7. "Silence Be Destroyed" - 2:49
8. "Imaginary Queen Ann" - 2:20
9. "On Short Wave" - 3:21
10. "Too Much Fun" - 4:09
