= Weatherman and Skin Goddess =

EP by Robert Pollard
- Released: 2008
- Label: Guided by Voices Inc.
- Producer: Todd Tobias

Robert Pollard chronology
Superman Was a Rocker (2008)	Weatherman and Skin Goddess (2008)	Robert Pollard Is Off to Business (2008)

Weatherman and Skin Goddess is a limited EP from singer-songwriter Robert Pollard. Only 1,000 CDs and 500 12 inch LPs were produced and were made available exclusively on Pollard's website. Released on April 15, this marks the first release from Robert Pollard's record label Guided by Voices Inc.

The title track is featured in Robert Pollard Is Off to Business.

== Track listing ==
1. "Weatherman and Skin Goddess"
2. "Kiss the Quiet Man"
3. "Coat Factory Zero"
