= Elephant Jokes =

2009 studio album by Robert Pollard

Studio album by Robert Pollard
- Released: 2009
- Genre: Rock, indie rock
- Label: Guided by Voices Inc.
- Producer: Todd Tobias

Robert Pollard chronology
The Crawling Distance (2009)	Elephant Jokes (2009)	We All Got Out of the Army (2010)

Professional ratings
Review scores
Source	Rating
Allmusic	4/5 stars
Pitchforkmedia	(7.1/10)
PopMatters	6/10 stars

Elephant Jokes is the 12th studio album released by singer-songwriter Robert Pollard on August 11, 2009, and the 8th full-length album to be released by Pollard (along with several EPs and singles) since the break-up of his band Guided by Voices in 2004. Unlike recent Pollard albums, Todd Tobias does not play all the instruments on Elephant Jokes, as Pollard plays some guitar on this album.

== Track listing ==
1. "Things Have Changed (Down in Mexico City)" - 1:57
2. "Johnny Optimist" - 2:54
3. "When a Man Walks Away" - 1:49
4. "Parts of Your World" - 1:45
5. "Symbols and Heads" - 2:08
6. "I Felt Revolved" - 1:44
7. "Epic Heads" - 1:37
8. "Stiff Me" - 2:16
9. "Compound X" - 1:36
10. "Accident Hero" - 1:38
11. "Tattered Lily" - 3:37
12. "Hippsville (Where the Frisbees Fly Forever)" - 1:11
13. "Newly Selected Dirt Spots" - 1:17
14. "Jimmy" - 1:53
15. "Pigeon Tripping" - 1:36
16. "Spectrum Factory" - 1:53
17. "Perverted Eyelash" - 1:36
18. "Cosmic Yellow Children" - 2:20
19. "Blown Out Man" - 2:31
20. "Desiring" - 2:31
21. "(All You Need) To Know" - 3:44
22. "Architectural Nightmare Man" - 2:33
