= Space City Kicks =

Studio album by Robert Pollard
- Released: January 18, 2011
- Genre: Indie rock
- Label: Guided by Voices Inc.
- Producer: Todd Tobias

Robert Pollard chronology
Moses on a Snail (2010)	Space City Kicks (2011)	Lord of the Birdcage (2011)

Professional ratings
Review scores
Source	Rating
Spin	7/10 stars

Space City Kicks is the 15th full-length solo studio album released by singer-songwriter Robert Pollard since 1996. It was released on January 18, 2011.

Pollard has stated that for Space City Kicks he "scrambled the titles of various classic rock songs in hopes that the new titles would provide inspiration...this particular experiment happened to work, I think. The titles seem instantly familiar although not immediately traceable.”

== Track listing ==
1. "Mr. Fantastic Must Die"
2. "Space City Kicks"
3. "Blowing like a Sunspot"
4. "I Wanna Be Your Man in the Moon"
5. "Sex She Said"
6. "One More Touch"
7. "Picture a Star"
8. "Something Strawberry"
9. "Follow a Loser"
10. "Children Ships"
11. "Stay Away"
12. "Gone Hoping"
13. "Into It"
14. "Tired Life"
15. "Touch Me in the Right Place at the Right Time"
16. "Woman to Fly"
17. "Getting Going"
18. "Spill the Blues"
