= We All Got Out of the Army =

We All Got Out Of The Army

Studio album by Robert Pollard
- Released: 2010
- Genre: Rock, indie rock
- Label: Guided by Voices Inc.
- Producer: Todd Tobias

Robert Pollard chronology
Elephant Jokes (2009)	We All Got Out Of The Army (2010)	Moses on a Snail (2010)

Professional ratings
Review scores
Source	Rating
Pitchfork Media	(7.3/10)

We All Got Out Of The Army is the 13th full-length solo studio album released by singer-songwriter Robert Pollard since 1996. The album was recorded at producer Todd Tobias's studio in Cleveland, Ohio, and was released in February 2010. Similar to Elephant Jokes Pollard plays guitar on a few solos on this album.

== Track listing ==
1. "Silk Rotor"
2. "I Can See"
3. "Post Hydrate Update"
4. "Your Rate Will Never Go Up"
5. "On Top of the Vertigo"
6. "Red Pyramid"
7. "Talking Dogs"
8. "Rice Train"
9. "Wild Girl"
10. "I'll Take the Cure"
11. "Cameo of a Smile"
12. "Poet Bums"
13. "How Many Stations"
14. "His Knighthood Photograph"
15. "Face Down"
16. "We All Got Out (Of the Army)"
17. "Faster To Babylon"
