= Robert Pollard Is Off to Business =

Studio album by Robert Pollard
- Released: 2008
- Genres: Rock and roll, indie rock
- Label: Guided by Voices Inc.
- Producer: Todd Tobias

Robert Pollard chronology
Weatherman and Skin Goddess EP (2008)	Robert Pollard Is Off to Business (2008)	The Crawling Distance (2009)

Professional ratings
Review scores
Source	Rating
AllMusic	4/5 stars
Pitchfork Media	3/5 stars
PopMatters	3.5/5 stars

Robert Pollard Is Off to Business is the tenth studio album by singer-songwriter Robert Pollard, released on June 2, 2008. This is the first LP release from Robert Pollard's new record label Guided by Voices Inc. All instrumentation on the album was performed by producer Todd Tobias. Many of the songs on the album are over three minutes in length, which is unusual for a Pollard release.

== Track listing ==
1. "The Original Heart"
2. "The Blondes"
3. "1 Years Old"
4. "Gratification to Concrete"
5. "No One but I"
6. "Weatherman and Skin Goddess"
7. "Confessions of a Teenage Jerk-Off"
8. "To the Path!"
9. "Western Centipede"
10. "Wealth and Hell-Being"
