= Moses on a Snail =

Studio album by Robert Pollard
- Released: 2010
- Genre: Rock, indie rock
- Label: Guided by Voices Inc.
- Producer: Todd Tobias

Robert Pollard chronology
We All Got Out of the Army (2010)	Moses on a Snail (2010)	Space City Kicks (2011)

Moses on a Snail is the 14th full-length solo studio album released by singer-songwriter Robert Pollard since 1996. The album was recorded at producer Todd Tobias's studio in Cleveland, Ohio, and was released on July 6, 2010.

Eddie Vedder, frontman of Pearl Jam (whom Pollard has opened for) issued a statement about the album, stating "It sounds to me like Robert Pollard uncharacteristically took ten years to make this one. He will tell you otherwise, but I don't believe him. It's too fucking good. If it were any other group this would be seen as their masterpiece. I think for Bob it's just another good day of weaving words into a kaleidoscope of one of a kind, thought-provoking perspectives".

The song "Big Time Wrestling" was used during the closing credits of 2011 documentary Fake It So Real, directed by Robert Greene.

== Track listing ==
1. "The Weekly Crow"
2. "A Constant Strangle"
3. "Arrows and Balloons"
4. "Lie Like a Dog"
5. "Ice Cold War"
6. "Each Is Good in His Own House"
7. "How I've Been in Trouble"
8. "It's News"
9. "It's a Pleasure Being You"
10. "Big Time Wrestling"
11. "Teardrop Painballs"
12. "Moses on a Snail"
