= Force Fields At Home =

Studio album by Teenage Guitar
- Released: 2013
- Length: 33:37
- Label: Guided By Voices Inc.

Teenage Guitar chronology
Force Fields At Home (2013)	More Lies From The Gooseberry Bush (2014)

Force Fields At Home is the first album by Robert Pollard's solo project Teenage Guitar.

== Tracklist ==
All songs written and performed by Pollard, unless noted otherwise.

1. Court Of Lions [Written: R.Pollard, Greg Demos - Drums: Greg Demos]
2. Come See The Supermoon
3. Current Pressings, Colors And Styles
4. Still Downstairs
5. 8 Bars Of Meaningless Mathilda
6. Harvest Whale
7. Strangers For A Better Society
8. It Takes A Great Promise
9. It Doesn't Mean I'm Underground
10. Baby Apple (Bass: Joe Patterson)
11. Peter Pan Can
12. Alice And Eddie (Fabulous Child Actors)
13. Alfred Never [Written: R.Pollard, Greg Demos - Drums: Greg Demos]
14. Gymnasium Politics
15. Atlantic Cod
16. Suburban Cycle Saccharine
17. Post Card To Pinky
18. Let Me
