= More Lies From The Gooseberry Bush =

Studio album by Teenage Guitar
- Released: 2014
- Genre: Indie rock
- Length: 32:09

Teenage Guitar chronology
Force Fields At Home (2013)	More Lies From The Gooseberry Bush (2014)

Professional ratings
Review scores
Source	Rating
AllMusic	2.5/5.0 stars

More Lies from the Gooseberry Bush is the second album by Robert Pollard's solo project, Teenage Guitar. Some editions of this album contained the previous release, Force Fields At Home as an additional bonus disc. Robert Pollard wrote every song and played every instrument on this record.

== Track listing ==
1. Go Around (The Apartment Dwellers)
2. Spliced At Acme Fair
3. A Guaranteed Ratio
4. Good Mary's House
5. Skin Ride
6. Full Glass Gone
7. All You Fought For
8. Gear Op
9. No Escape
10. Matthew's Ticker And Shaft (Four Parts: Come To Breakfast, The Girls Arrive, Division Of Swans, When Death Has A Nice Ring)
11. The Instant American
12. Normalized
13. New Light
14. Birthplace Of The Electric Starter
15. A Year That Could Have Been Worse
