= Nick Harmer =

American musician (born 1975)

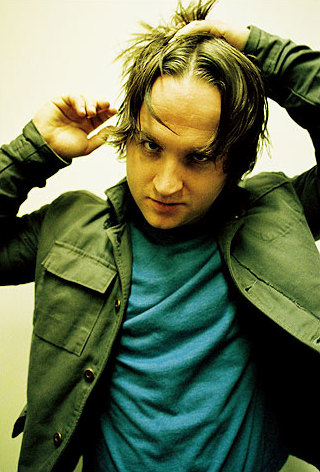
- Harmer, 2007

Background information
- Born: Nicholas Scott Harmer; January 23, 1975 (age 51); Landstuhl, Germany
- Genres: Indie rock
- Occupations: Bassist, keyboards, songwriter
- Years active: 1996–present

Nick Harmer (born January 23, 1975) is an American musician, best known as a founding member and bass guitarist for the indie rock band Death Cab for Cutie, with whom he has recorded eleven studio albums. In addition to bass, Harmer plays keyboards for the band with several songwriting credits. Prior to joining Death Cab for Cutie, Harmer was a member of bands Eureka Farm and Juno.

Over a career now spanning more than three decades, Harmer and Death Cab for Cutie have been described as "one of the definitive indie bands of the 2000s and 2010s". They were one of the major bands associated with the rise of indie rock, with their 2000s-era output producing several platinum-selling albums and charting singles. The band has received numerous accolades, including multiple Grammy Award nominations.

In April 2024, Consequence named Harmer the ninety-fourth greatest bass guitarist of all time.

== Life and career ==
=== Early years ===
Harmer was born on January 23, 1975, in Landstuhl, Germany. He grew up in the Pacific Northwest, attending high school at Governor John R. Rogers High School in Puyallup, Washington. Harmer then attended Western Washington University in Bellingham, earning a degree in English in 1998. While at Western Washington, in 1996, he joined the band Eureka Farm with his college roommate and future Death Cab bandmate Ben Gibbard.

=== Death Cab for Cutie ===
Gibbard had left Eureka Farm to start Death Cab for Cutie. Looking to form a full band after releasing early demo songs, Gibbard recruited Harmer, who joined the band in 1997. They would be joined by another Eureka Farm alumnus, drummer Jason McGerr, in 2003. Harmer and Gibbard are the only members of the band to have played on every DCFC album, and Harmer has numerous co-writing credits, including We Laugh Indoors, The New Year, Grapevine Fires and I Will Possess Your Heart.

== Influences ==
One of Harmer's first major influences was Jane's Addiction bass guitarist Eric Avery, with Harmer describing his playing as "melodic, full of hooks, indelible tone [and] exceptional feel. I fell in love with the bass guitar learning how to play Eric’s parts on Nothing's Shocking. Through him I began to understand how the bass could support and stand out without stealing the spotlight and being overly flashy."

== Personal life ==
Harmer lives in the Seattle area with his wife Kate and family, postponing Death Cab for Cutie shows in 2015 to attend the birth of a child. Harmer has taught with the 826 Valencia organization, and has been involved with the Kiva organization, offering micro-finance to social impact businesses and non-profit organizations.

== Discography ==
=== Death Cab for Cutie ===
- You Can Play These Songs with Chords (1997)
- Something About Airplanes (1998)
- We Have the Facts and We're Voting Yes (2000)
- The Photo Album (2001)
- Transatlanticism (2003)
- Plans (2005)
- Narrow Stairs (2008)
- Codes and Keys (2011)
- Kintsugi (2015)
- Thank You for Today (2018)
- Asphalt Meadows (2022)
- I Built You a Tower (2026)
