= Here to Forever =

Single by Death Cab for Cutie

from the album Asphalt Meadows
- Released: July 13, 2022
- Length: 3:46
- Label: Atlantic
- Songwriters: Ben Gibbard; Zac Rae
- Producer: John Congleton

Death Cab for Cutie singles chronology
"Roman Candles" (2022)	"Here to Forever" (2022)	"Foxglove Through the Clearcut" (2022)

Music video
- "Here to Forever" on YouTube

"Here to Forever" is a song by American rock band Death Cab for Cutie, the fifth track on their tenth studio album, Asphalt Meadows (2022). It was released as the second single from Asphalt Meadows on July 13, 2022, through Atlantic Records.

== Background ==
"Here to Forever" examines the ephemerality of life. The song's protagonist views an old movie and makes the observation that though the film remains, all of its participants are long gone. Throughout the song's chorus, Gibbard pleads for a larger point to existence: "I wanna know the measure / From here to forever / And I wanna feel the pressure / Of God or whatever." In an interview, Gibbard revealed the lyrics stem from his experience viewing French New Wave films, and marveling at the talent of stars like Monica Vitti, Anna Karina, and Jeanne Moreau.

== Music video ==
The song's music video was directed by Lance Bangs. The clip stars Gibbard assisting in packaging and pressing the band's album at a vinyl pressing plant, while two employees—played by comedians Natalie Palamides and Courtney Pauroso—goof off instead. The clips are intercut with footage of the band performing the song.

== Release and reception ==
The band first released the song as a pre-release single for Asphalt Meadows on July 13, 2022. Later that month, the band promoted the song with a performance on The Late Show With Stephen Colbert. "Here to Forever" hit number one on Billboard's Alternative Airplay and Adult Alternative Airplay rankings, marking the band's second and seventh chart-toppers respectively.

"Here to Forever" received positive reviews from contemporary music critics. Tom Briehan of Stereogum described the song as "a grand and stirring rocker, one that mixes the soft-eyed sensitivity of the band’s early days with their arena-sized major-label work." Neil Z. Yeung at AllMusic called the song "classic Death Cab, balancing yearning and uncertainty with Gibbard's typically evocative lyrics."

== Charts ==
Chart performance for "Here to Forever"
Chart (2022)	Peak position
Canada Rock (Billboard)	8
Czech Republic (Modern Rock)	15
US Hot Rock & Alternative Songs (Billboard)	44
US Rock & Alternative Airplay (Billboard)	2

=== Year-end charts ===
Chart (2022)	Position
US Adult Alternative Airplay Songs (Billboard)	7
US Alternative Airplay Songs (Billboard)	24
US Rock & Alternative Airplay Songs (Billboard)	18
