= Asphalt Meadows =

Studio album by Death Cab for Cutie
- Released: September 16, 2022
- Recorded: 2021
- Studios: United (Los Angeles); Grumpybeard (Los Angeles); Litho (Seattle)
- Genres: Indie rock, indie pop, post-punk revival, noise pop, indietronica, alternative rock
- Length: 42:05
- Label: Atlantic
- Producer: John Congleton

Death Cab for Cutie chronology
The Blue EP (2019)	Asphalt Meadows (2022)	I Built You a Tower (2026)

Singles from Asphalt Meadows
- 1. "Roman Candles" Released: May 11, 2022; 2. "Here to Forever" Released: July 13, 2022; 3. "Foxglove Through the Clearcut" Released: August 12, 2022; 4. "Pepper" Released: September 16, 2022

Asphalt Meadows is the tenth studio album by American rock band Death Cab for Cutie. It was released on September 16, 2022, through Atlantic Records.

Produced by John Congleton, the album was preceded by the singles "Roman Candles", "Here to Forever" and "Foxglove Through the Clearcut". "Here To Forever" became the band's seventh career #1 hit on Billboard's Adult Alternative Airplay chart in August 2022, and its follow-up "Pepper" became the band's eighth in March 2023.

== Background and recording ==
In 2018, Death Cab for Cutie released its ninth studio album, Thank You for Today, which was the first to feature new members Dave Depper and Zac Rae, who joined the band in 2015, following the departure of longtime guitarist and producer Chris Walla. At the tail end of an extensive and successful tour in support of the album, the band issued a stopgap extended play, titled The Blue EP in 2019, which combined newly written material – recorded with producer Peter Katsis – with leftover songs from the Thank You for Today sessions.

The following year, the worldwide COVID-19 pandemic took hold, causing social and economic disruption; for the band, it altered their ability to tour and record in-person. While certain musical ideas and pieces predate the onset of the pandemic, much of Asphalt Meadows was written throughout the course of 2020 and 2021. For half of Asphalt Meadows, the band employed tactics to write material remotely, utilizing Dropbox to send files back and forth. On Monday, one band member would write a bed track for a new song, before handing it off to the next musician, and so on. Each musician had creative license to take the music wherever they felt comfortable, leading to more unexpected harmonic avenues. Gibbard likened the process to "chain-letter songwriting." The method gave rise to nearly ninety songs in varying stages of completion, later narrowed down to eleven for the record. The band initially began working on recording the material with a British producer, but "COVID and creative differences" forced the group to reconsider.

The band came together to record this material and more with producer John Congleton, a veteran musician who both engineered and mixed the project. Rae had first introduced Gibbard and Congleton in mid-2021, who developed a fast friendship. Asphalt Meadows was recorded mainly at United Recording and Grumpybeard in Los Angeles, with additional recording taking place at Studio Litho in the band's home of Seattle.

On March 10, 2023, the band released an acoustic version of the album. The acoustic album included a twelfth track, a cover of Low's "The Plan" in tribute to Low drummer Mimi Parker, who died in November 2022.

== Composition ==
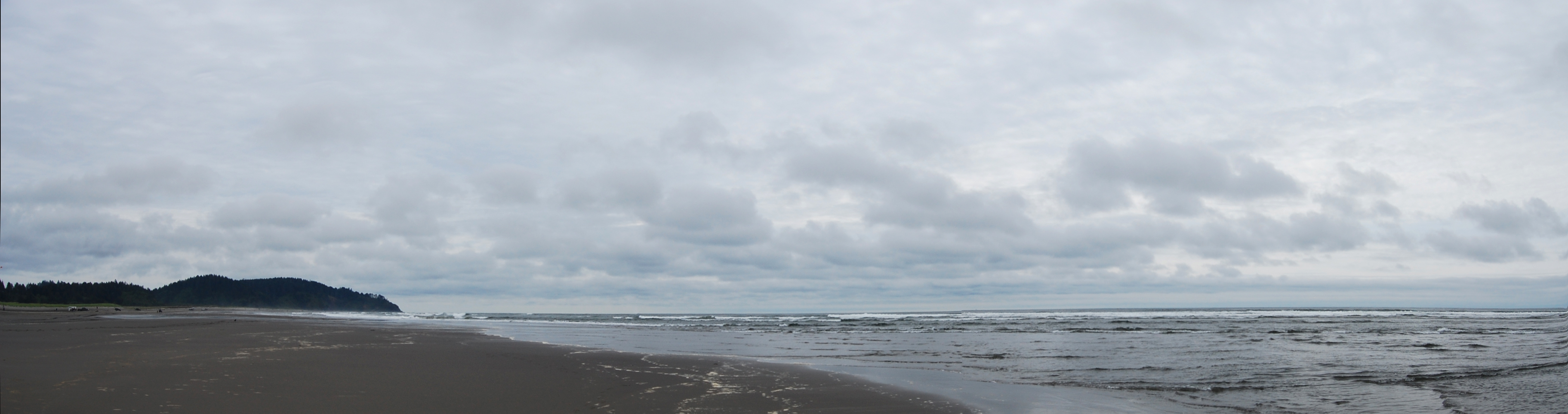
The album's centerpiece, "Foxglove Through the Clearcut", examines a protagonist who lives by an ocean, but fears its contents.

Musically, Asphalt Meadows has been described by music critics as indie rock, indie pop, and post-punk. The opening track, "I Don't Know How I Survive", speaks directly to Gibbard's personal anxiety surrounding the pandemic. "Roman Candles" stemmed from the fact that the album lacked fast, more immediate songs, leading Gibbard to initially develop the song around a Faust sample. Congleton discarded the sample and instead built the track from heavily distorted kick drum sounds. "Rand McNally" takes its title from the American publishing company that produced physical maps and atlases. Gibbard wrote the song with former band members Chris Walla, Nathan Good and Michael Schorr in mind, noting: "This is my life's work. When members leave bands, they're often seminal members. That fans continue to support [the band] is a testament to how important the music is to them. I wanted to write something to and for everyone who has been in this band, who helped make it what it is, to say I'm not going to let the light fade."

"Here to Forever" examines the passage of time; in the song, a protagonist views an old movie and observes that though the film remains, much of its participants are long dead. The post-rock inflected "Foxglove Through the Clearcut" anchors the middle of the record, and centers around a slow-building spoken word monologue interspersed with crashing guitar work. The song's origins date to the earliest years of the band: Gibbard discovered reels of four-track recordings he made from that period, and took a guitar part from one demo dating to 1998. He wrote the song about a fictional character—a man who "used to live by the ocean but never set foot in the sea"—but came around to finding some autobiography in his prose: "I started to realize that it's [about] me. Perhaps it's because of the gap between the beginning of this composition and now, there was me at two different places in my life and I was speaking to myself after I'd had a long journey," he explained.

== Reception ==
Professional ratings
Aggregate scores
Source	Rating
Metacritic	82/100
Review scores
Source	Rating
AllMusic	4/5 stars
The Daily Telegraph	4/5 stars
DIY	4/5 stars
Exclaim!	8/10
musicOMH	3.5/5 stars
NME	4/5 stars
Paste	7.6/10
Pitchfork	7.4/10
PopMatters	8/10
Under the Radar	9/10 stars

Asphalt Meadows received critical acclaim. At Metacritic, which assigns a normalized rating out of 100 to reviews from mainstream publications, the album received an average score of 82, based on 16 reviews, indicating "universal acclaim".

Tatiana Tenreyro at Spin called it their "best album in years", while Rick Quinn from PopMatters considered it a mid-career triumph, writing that it "doesn't merely repeat the melancholy of their work in the early aughts. Instead, it expands and deepens their signature sound without abandoning it." AllMusic's Neil Z. Yeung was effusive, commenting, "For a group so deep into their careers, the album sounds surprisingly urgent and revitalized [...] energetic highlights abound."

In a more reserved review for Pitchfork, Ian Cohen wrote that, "if Asphalt Meadows doesn't amplify the stakes of forty-something romantic misunderstandings the way "A Movie Script Ending" or "Title and Registration" did in college, it at least unlocks the repressed memory of what it was like to be deeply moved by Death Cab for Cutie songs."

== Track listing ==
All tracks are written by Ben Gibbard, unless otherwise noted.

Asphalt Meadows track listing
No.	Title	Writer(s)	Length
1.	"I Don't Know How I Survive"		3:40
2.	"Roman Candles"		2:10
3.	"Asphalt Meadows"	Gibbard; Nick Harmer; Zac Rae	4:05
4.	"Rand McNally"	Gibbard; Dave Depper	4:06
5.	"Here to Forever"	Gibbard; Rae	3:46
6.	"Foxglove Through the Clearcut"		5:15
7.	"Pepper"	Gibbard; Rae	2:48
8.	"I Miss Strangers"	Gibbard; Depper	4:24
9.	"Wheat Like Waves"		3:38
10.	"Fragments from the Decade"	Gibbard; Jason McGerr; Rae	4:38
11.	"I'll Never Give Up on You"	Gibbard; Harmer; Rae; Depper	3:31
Total length:			42:05

The acoustic version adds:

No.	Title	Writer(s)	Length
12.	"The Plan"	Low	3:22

== Personnel ==
Death Cab for Cutie

- Dave Depper – guitar (all tracks), piano (track 4)
- Ben Gibbard – vocals, guitar, cover photograph
- Nick Harmer – bass guitar
- Jason McGerr – drums
- Zac Rae – keyboards

Technical

- John Congleton – production, mixing, engineering
- Bob Ludwig – mastering
- Jon Roberts – engineering assistance
- Scott Moore – engineering assistance

Visuals

- Mark Obriski – layout, design
- Michelle Shiers – interior photographs
- Rachel Demy – additional art direction

== Charts ==
Chart performance for Asphalt Meadows
Chart (2022)	Peak position
Australian Digital Albums (ARIA)	13
Belgian Albums (Ultratop Flanders)	81
German Albums (Offizielle Top 100)	95
Hungarian Albums (MAHASZ)	14
Japanese Albums (Oricon)	179
Scottish Albums (Official Charts)	15
Spanish Vinyl Albums (PROMUSICAE)	79
Swiss Albums (Schweizer Hitparade)	82
UK Albums (Official Charts)	89
US Billboard 200	60
US Top Alternative Albums (Billboard)	4
US Top Rock Albums (Billboard)	12
