= Punching the Flowers =

"Punching The Flowers"

Single by Death Cab For Cutie

from the album I Built You a Tower
- Released: April 28, 2026
- Studio: Animal Rites in Los Angeles
- Genre: Alternative
- Length: 3:12
- Label: Anti-
- Songwriter: Benjamin Gibbard
- Lyricist: Benjamin Gibbard
- Producer: John Congleton

Death Cab For Cutie singles chronology
"Riptides" (2026)	"Punching The Flowers" (2026)	"Stone Over Water" (2026)

"Punching the Flowers" is a song recorded at Animal Rites in Los Angeles by indie rock band Death Cab for Cutie released on April 28, 2026, as the second single from the band's eleventh studio album, I Built You a Tower on Anti- Records.

== Background ==
Ben Gibbard describes "'Punching the Flowers' is a song about stagnation and the feeling of being imprisioned by the known and about the damage done when someone ventured deeper into the unknown." Gibbard further explained with, "We weren't afraid of a deeply human sound, some messiness", and "This isn't an airbrushed photograph. This is what we look like, this is what we sound like."

== Critical reception ==
"Punching the Flowers" was taken with mostly positive reviews. Fenton Wright from WERS radio said "The lyrics of this song might be some of my favorites from new releases this year. They create this painfully beautiful picture of someone longing to have some kind of happiness or freedom in their life. However, with the line 'punching the flowers,' Death Cab makes it clear to us that this person is fighting any chance that they have to be happy whether knowingly or unknowingly. In this process of trying to take control of their lives, these people end up missing out on the things and people that love them."

Artistrack Magazine said, "It’s easy for bands who have been around for three decades to go on autopilot, but this doesn’t feel like a legacy act playing it safe. The track is shimmering and upbeat, yet the lyrics still carry that signature Gibbard weight—wrestling with the feeling of fighting against things you can’t change."
