= Gold Rush (song) =

Single by Death Cab for Cutie

from the album Thank You for Today
- Released: June 13, 2018
- Genre: Indie pop; alternative rock
- Length: 4:00
- Label: Atlantic
- Songwriters: Ben Gibbard, Dave Depper, Yoko Ono
- Producer: Rich Costey

Death Cab for Cutie singles chronology
"Million Dollar Loan" (2016)	"Gold Rush" (2018)	"I Dreamt We Spoke Again" (2018)

Gold Rush is a song by American indie pop band Death Cab for Cutie, released as the lead single for their ninth studio album, Thank You for Today, on June 13, 2018.

== Origins and lyrics ==
"Gold Rush" originated as a demo that the band planned to discard, but was revisited at the suggestion of producer Rich Costey and combined with another demo. The song was written by lead vocalist and guitarist Ben Gibbard as "a requiem for a skyline", inspired by the rapid changes to Seattle's Capitol Hill neighborhood, where Gibbard had lived for 20 years and some areas were "almost unrecognizable" due to the influx of workers for companies like Amazon.

== Composition ==
The song makes use of a sample from "Mind Train", a song from Yoko Ono's 1971 album Fly. The song is in the key of F major and has a BPM of 80. The title is mentioned 46 times throughout the song.

== Music video ==
The music video for "Gold Rush", directed by Alex Southam, features Gibbard walking down a city street, observing passersby as their outfits change to a modern style. The video ends with Gibbard stopped by a swarm of people distracted by their smartphones.

== Media appearances ==
Death Cab for Cutie performed the song on the June 21, 2018, episode of The Late Show with Stephen Colbert. It appears on the EA Sports FIFA 19 video game.

== Charts ==
=== Weekly charts ===
Chart (2018)	Peak position
Czech Republic (Modern Rock)	14
US Adult Alternative Airplay (Billboard)	1
US Alternative Airplay (Billboard)	6
US Hot Rock & Alternative Songs (Billboard)	14
US Rock & Alternative Airplay (Billboard)	5

=== Year-end charts ===
Chart (2018)	Position
US Alternative Songs (Billboard)	30
US Hot Rock Songs (Billboard)	44
US Rock Airplay Songs (Billboard)	24

=== All-time charts ===
Chart (1995–2021)	Position
US Adult Alternative Songs (Billboard)	73
