= The Ghosts of Beverly Drive =

Single by Death Cab for Cutie

from the album Kintsugi
- Released: March 9, 2015
- Genre: Indie rock; post-punk
- Length: 4:04
- Label: Atlantic
- Songwriter(s): Ben Gibbard
- Producer(s): Rich Costey

Death Cab for Cutie singles chronology
"Black Sun" (2015)	"The Ghosts of Beverly Drive" (2015)	"Good Help (Is So Hard to Find)" (2016)

"The Ghosts of Beverly Drive" is a song by American rock band Death Cab for Cutie. It is the second single from their eighth studio album Kintsugi. The driving, uptempo track explores themes of loss in the aftermath of heartbreak. Frontman Ben Gibbard wrote the song after his divorce from actress Zooey Deschanel, and the lyrics of the song directly reference Beverly Hills and what he viewed as its vapid celebrity culture.

Music critics complimented the tune for its hooks and spirit, and "The Ghosts of Beverly Drive" was a radio hit in the United States, reaching the top five on Billboard's rock and alternative rankings. It has been a staple of the band's live performances since its release.

== Background ==
The mournful "Ghosts of Beverly Drive" focuses on the specters of the past. It deals with Gibbard's ill-fated stint living in Los Angeles between 2009 and 2011, and more directly, his marriage and divorce from actress Zooey Deschanel. Gibbard did not specifically suggest the song referenced Deschanel, but conceded it should be "fairly obvious". In the song's chorus, Gibbard finds himself "return[ing] to the scene of these crimes, where the hedgerows slowly wind." In some ways, the song is a spiritual sequel to the band's 2001 song "Why You'd Want to Live Here", also a critique of Hollywood.

Musically, critics interpreted its "muscular" sound as reminiscent of post-punk. Brian Stout from PopMatters compared it to the work of New Order. Electronic pulses and synthesizers take a forefront in the song, part of an increasingly natural textural focus for the band, according to bassist Nick Harmer. To this end, the song was remixed by electronic musician Tycho.

== Music video ==
The song's music video was directed by Robert Hales. In the in black and white-shot clip, the members of the band play employees of a celebrity tour bus company in Los Angeles, cruising tourists around the city's ritziest neighborhoods in search of stars. Hales took several star tours as research for the role, and based several moments, such as the scene in which the band are sprayed with a hose, from real moments. James Montgomery at Rolling Stone wrote that the video "explore[s] the sense of separation that's so prevalent in a city like Los Angeles, where societal divides are often as apparent as the ivy-covered walls surrounding a Bel-Air mansion."

== Release ==
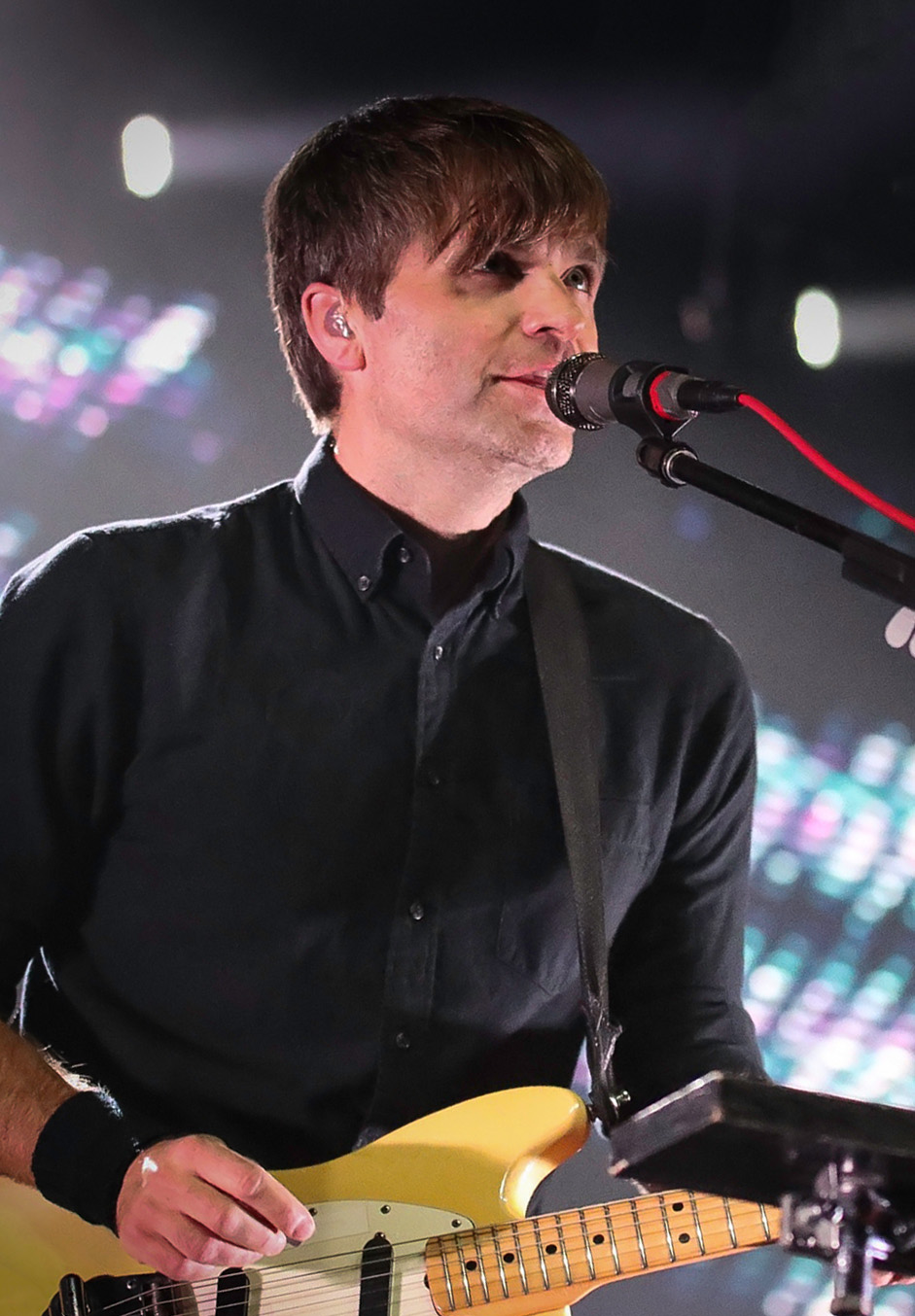
Critics complimented Ben Gibbard's appealing and allegorical songwriting.

The band debuted the song in live performances leading up to release of Kintsugi. Its studio version premiered on March 9, 2015. The band promoted the song and album with a performance on the late-night programs The Tonight Show Starring Jimmy Fallon and Conan. "The Ghosts of Beverly Drive" was a domestic alt-rock radio hit, reaching the top five on Billboard's Alternative Airplay and Rock Airplay rankings.

The song was well-received by contemporary music critics. Brian Passey from USA Today considered it an album highlight. James Rettig from Stereogum praised its "tight hooks". Evan Sawdey at PopMatters praised its energy, while Colin Stutz at Billboard called the song "a moving number from the band that’s no stranger to literary lyrics, as frontman Ben Gibbard leads listeners along a winding metaphor propped up by lush production." Rachel Brodsky of Spin complimented its "radio-ready" uptempo rhythm. Ian Cohen, writing for Pitchfork, considered it among the better songs on its parent album, writing: "[It's] where Gibbard remembers to write great Death Cab for Cutie songs the way he knows how—zooming on important specifics that speak on a larger idea, trying to make sense of newly formed concepts as he’s explaining them to someone else, rather than starting with the most broad, market-tested metaphors." He later ranked it among the band's best songs for Uproxx.

The song has been a staple of the band's live performances since its debut.

== Personnel ==
Credits adapted from AllMusic:

Death Cab for Cutie

- Benjamin Gibbard – guitar, vocals
- Nicholas Harmer – bass guitar
- Jason McGerr – drums, percussion
- Chris Walla – guitar, keyboard, backing vocals

Production

- Christopher Possanza – producer
- Martin Cooke – engineer
- Rich Costey – engineer, mixing, producer
- Nicolas Fournier – engineer
- Mario Borgatta – assistant engineer
- Bob Ludwig – mastering
- Josh Rosenfeld – producer

== Charts ==
=== Weekly charts ===
Chart (2015)	Peak position
US Alternative Airplay (Billboard)	3
US Adult Alternative Songs (Billboard)	15
Canada Rock (Billboard)	31
US Rock Airplay (Billboard)	4
US Hot Rock & Alternative Songs (Billboard)	21

=== Year-end charts ===
Chart (2015)	Position
US Rock Airplay Songs (Billboard)	38
Chart (2016)	Position
US Hot Rock Songs (Billboard)	97
US Rock Airplay Songs (Billboard)	31
