= Riptides (song) =

2026 single by Death Cab for Cutie

Single by Death Cab for Cutie

from the album I Built You a Tower
- Released: March 16, 2026
- Studio: Animal Rites in Los Angeles
- Genre: Alternative rock
- Length: 3:17
- Label: Anti-
- Songwriter: Ben Gibbard
- Lyricist: Ben Gibbard
- Producer: John Congleton

Death Cab for Cutie singles chronology
| "Pepper" (2022) | "Riptides" (2026) | "Punching the Flowers" (2026) |

"Riptides" is a song recorded at Animal Rites In Los Angeles by American rock band Death Cab for Cutie. The song was released on March 16, 2026, as the first single from the group's eleventh studio album I Built You a Tower.

== Background ==
Ben Gibbard described the song as focusing on the "challenge of dealing with personal struggles as the world around us experiences tragedy and loss on an unfathomable scale".Gibbard further explains in the press release: “There’s this need to find a place in ourselves to put loss and grief. A place that can hold it so we can move on with our lives. But there are these moments where the trauma breaks out of that shell we created for it.”

== Critical reception ==
"Riptides" received mostly positive reviews. Ahni Brown Harbin said "The song's lyrics seem to juxtapose the happier tone of the instrumentals. In the song's bridge, Gibbard sings 'I'm too tired to talk/I'm too tired to end the war/And I can't seem to hold it together anymore,' hinting at the song's thematic concerns of mental health when everything seems out of control." Nina Cocoran, in a review for Pitchfork, said "It's a sentiment echoed on 'Riptides', where he confesses: 'I'm too tired to end the war/And I can't seem to hold it together.' I Built You a Tower reckons with the moment that agony begins to spill over, but without invoking a victim complex or the wounded limping of past narrators."

== Charts ==
Chart performance
| Chart (2026) | Peak position |
|---|---|
| Canada Modern Rock (Billboard Canada) | 1 |
| Canada Rock (Billboard) | 8 |
| US Adult Alternative Airplay (Billboard) | 1 |
| US Rock & Alternative Airplay (Billboard) | 4 |
