= Dave Depper =

American musician

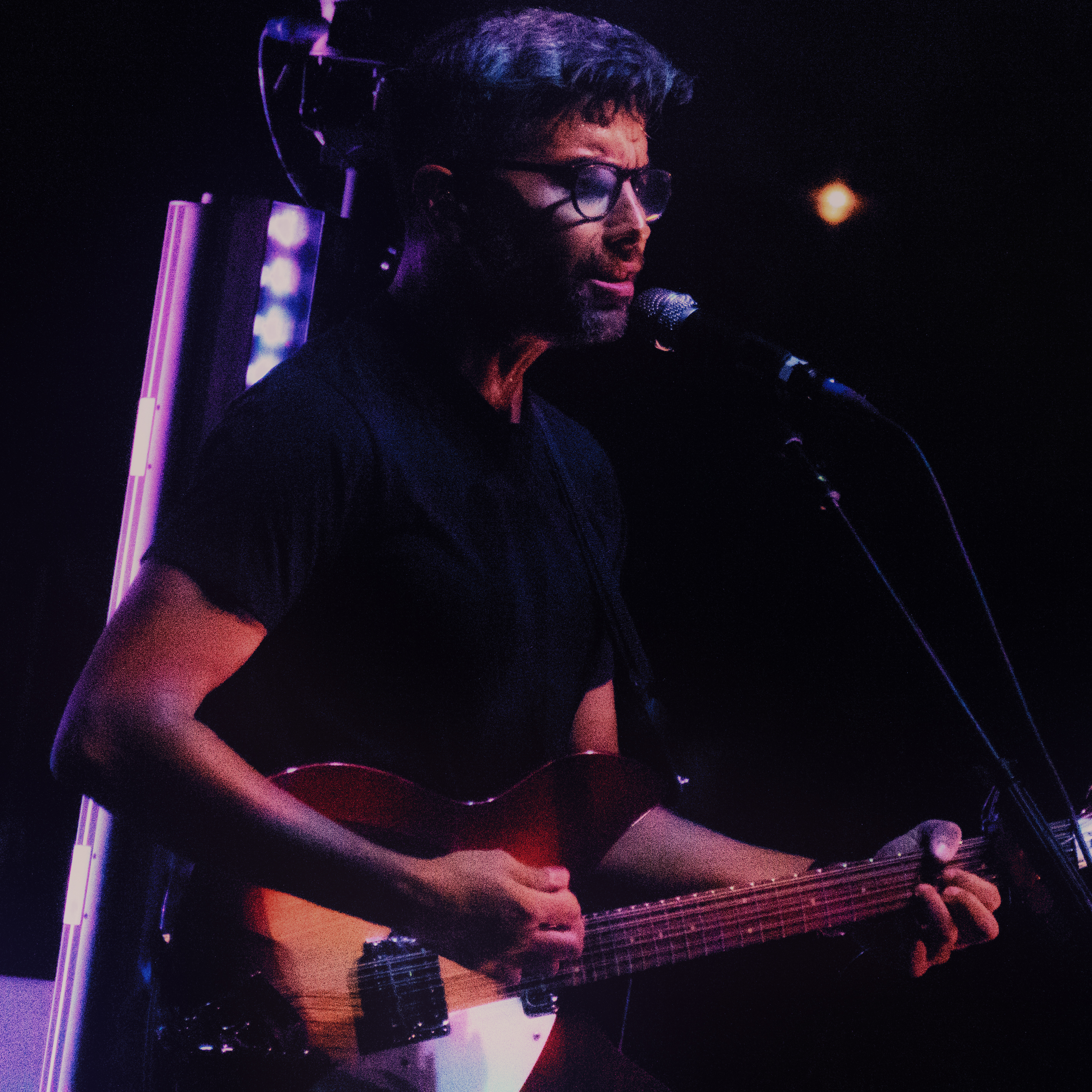
- Depper performing in 2019

Background information
- Genres: Indie rock; indie pop
- Instruments: Guitar; keyboards
- Labels: Atlantic Records; Tender Loving Empire
- Member of: Death Cab for Cutie
- Website: davedepper.com

Dave Depper is an American musician, best known as the guitarist and keyboardist of the indie rock band Death Cab for Cutie, with whom he has recorded three studio albums and two EPs. Depper was an additional live member of the Postal Service during their 2023–2024 reunion tour.

Alongside his work in Death Cab for Cutie and the Postal Service, Depper has been a touring member of Menomena and Fruit Bats and a member of Ray LaMontagne, Corin Tucker, Laura Gibson and Mirah's backing bands.

== Music career ==
Depper began his career playing with various Pacific North West artists, including Menomena, Fruit Bats, Mirah, Corin Tucker, and Laura Gibson. In 2014, Depper joined Ray LaMontagne's touring band; he was later recruited by indie rock pioneers Death Cab for Cutie during their 2015 world tour in support of their eighth album, Kintsugi. Following the departure of member Chris Walla, Depper and Zac Rae joined Death Cab as full-time members, receiving credits on the band's ninth album, Thank You for Today. Depper has recorded two further studio albums with the band, Asphalt Meadows (2022) and I Built You a Tower (2026).

In 2017, Depper released his first solo album, Emotional Freedom Technique, which was well received by critics.

== Personal life ==
Depper grew up in Bend, Oregon and currently lives in Portland. He attended the University of Oregon, where he studied computer and information science, graduating in 2002. He then worked as a software engineer for several years before transitioning to working as a touring musician full-time.

Depper shares a passion for distance running with bandmate Ben Gibbard, often running between 6 and 12 miles before shows. He has a Siamese cat named Doctor Wu, after the Steely Dan song of the same name.

== Discography ==
Solo

- Emotional Freedom Technique (2017)

with Death Cab for Cutie

- Thank You for Today (2018)
- The Blue EP (2019)
- The Georgia EP (2020)
- Asphalt Meadows (2022)
- I Built You a Tower (2026)
