= Eureka Farm =

American band

Eureka Farm was a band from Bellingham, Washington. It began in 1996 with members Arman Bohn (songwriter/guitar), Ben Gibbard (drums), and Nick Harmer (bass). During this time the band went by the name "Shed". Gibbard left the band and was replaced by Jason McGerr (drums) in 1996. The band changed its name to "Eureka Farm" in 1997. Harmer was replaced by Chuck Keller (bass) in 1997, and Caspar Sonnet (keys, alto saxophone, and bass clarinet) joined in 1998.

== Band members ==
- Arman Bohn (guitar, vocals)
- Jason McGerr (drums, vocals)
- Nick Harmer (bass, vocals)
- Chuck Keller (bass, vocals)
- Caspar Sonnet (alto saxophone, bass clarinet, keyboards, vocals)

== After Eureka Farm ==
- Bohn completed his first solo album "Bits" in 2009.
- Bohn and Sonnet played as The Misadventures of Two from 2005-2006.
- Sonnet completed his first solo album "Identify" in 2013 released on Marriage Records
- Keller is in the band Virgin Islands.
- Gibbard, McGerr, and Harmer are in the band Death Cab for Cutie.

== Discography ==
- The View (1999)
- Analog (1997)
