= I Built You a Tower =

Studio album by Death Cab for Cutie
- Released: June 5, 2026
- Studios: Animal Rites (Los Angeles); Death Cab for Cutie members' home studios (Note: The group's home studios are located in Seattle, Bellingham, Los Angeles, and Portland.); Studio Litho (Seattle) (Note: Additional tracking on "Trap Door")
- Genres: Indie rock; alternative rock
- Length: 38:34
- Label: Anti-
- Producer: John Congleton

Death Cab for Cutie chronology
Asphalt Meadows (2022)	I Built You a Tower (2026)

Singles from I Built You a Tower
- 1. "Riptides" Released: March 16, 2026; 2. "Punching the Flowers" Released: April 28, 2026; 3. "Stone Over Water" Released: June 2, 2026

I Built You a Tower is the eleventh studio album by American rock band Death Cab for Cutie, released on June 5, 2026, on Anti-. Produced by John Congleton, who had worked with the band on their previous album, Asphalt Meadows (2022), the album was preceded by the singles "Riptides", "Punching the Flowers", and "Stone Over Water".

Released to critical acclaim, the album's lyrics were inspired by frontman Ben Gibbard's recent divorce. The album features a heavier rock aesthetic throughout, with the band working together as a live five-piece during the writing and recording process. It is the band's first studio album in over twenty-three years to be released on an independent record label, after the band parted ways with their longtime label, Atlantic Records, the previous year.

Upon the album's release, I Built You a Tower reached number eighty on the Billboard 200, number fourteen on the Billboard Independent Albums Chart and number eighty-nine on the UK Albums Chart.

== Background ==
I Built You a Tower was created during a period marked by both reflection on the band's past and significant personal change for frontman Ben Gibbard. At the time, they were touring to mark the 20th anniversaries of the albums Transatlanticism (2003) and Plans (2005), while also performing with side project the Postal Service. During this period, Gibbard was also dealing with the end of his marriage. He described the challenge of performing nightly while managing the emotional weight of his personal life, noting that it required a process of emotional compartmentalization similar to what many people do in everyday tasks.

He likened emotional experiences such as grief, trauma, or loss to a "tower" in one's inner landscape—visible and acknowledged but contained within a structure. The album explores the ways in which these emotions can occasionally resurface unexpectedly, despite efforts to keep them organized and controlled, reflecting on the tension between personal vulnerability and the demands of daily life.

== Recording ==
Recording sessions for the album took place over a three-week period at Animal Rites, the Los Angeles studio of producer John Congleton. Additional parts were recorded remotely by band members in their home studios in Seattle, Bellingham, Los Angeles, and Portland. Congleton previously worked with the band on their last album, Asphalt Meadows (2022).

== Writing and composition ==
I Built You a Tower features a heavier rock sound than previous Death Cab for Cutie albums, with Ben Gibbard citing the post-hardcore band Fugazi as a key influence: "[Their music is] so unadorned, and everything has a lane. Nothing is there that doesn’t need to be there. They did not have effects pedals. They just would roll the volume up, and if you wanted it louder, you rolled it. [...] The thing I love about those Fugazi records is there’s just nowhere to hide in the arrangement. Everything in there is essential because there’s only four voices."

The track "Stone Over Water" was originally excluded from the band's preferred album track listing, with producer John Congleton vouching for its inclusion. The song originally had a nine-minute krautrock-inspired outro, which Congleton advised against.

Regarding the album's reputation as a divorce-inspired album, Gibbard noted: "People can consider it [a divorce record] if they like, but it’s not about that as much as it is how we have to compartmentalize the grief that we experience, just so we can get through our days because we can’t let ourselves fall apart, especially if we have responsibilities." Regarding the album's title and thematic framework Gibbard elaborated: "The big skyscraper is the band, and a smaller, two-story apartment building is the woman I dated for two months in 2002. All those memories are in those buildings. You can see them on the horizon. You know they’re there, but you’re not constantly face-to-face with those people and those experiences. You just know they’re in those areas."

== Release ==
In January 2026, the band signed with Anti-, marking an end to their 22-year period signed to major label Atlantic. Ben Gibbard said the band was "thrilled" to join Anti-, citing its roster of favorite artists and longtime friends. In announcing the move, they also announced a forthcoming North American tour featuring Japanese Breakfast, Jay Som, and Nation of Language at select dates. The band later announced I Built You a Tower alongside single "Riptides" on March 16, as well as additional European dates for later that year. The second single, "Punching the Flowers", was released on April 28. "Stone Over Water", the third single, was released on June 2.

The album currently has a rating of 83 from 17 reviews on aggregator site Metacritic, indicating "critical acclaim".

== Track listing ==
All lyrics are written by Benjamin Gibbard; all music is composed by Gibbard, except where noted.

I Built You a Tower track listing
No.	Title	Music	Length
1.	"Full of Stars"	Gibbard; Dave Depper	3:22
2.	"Punching the Flowers"		3:11
3.	"Pep Talk"		3:14
4.	"I Built You a Tower (A)"		3:23
5.	"Envy the Birds"		4:20
6.	"Stone Over Water"		3:14
7.	"How Heavenly a State"	Gibbard; Depper; Nicholas Harmer	3:29
8.	"Trap Door"	Gibbard; Zac Rae	3:52
9.	"Riptides"		3:17
10.	"The Flavor of Metal"		3:45
11.	"I Built You a Tower (B)"	Gibbard; Depper	3:27
Total length:			38:34

== Personnel ==
Credits courtesy of Bandcamp.

=== Death Cab for Cutie ===
- Benjamin Gibbard
- Nicholas Harmer
- Jason McGerr
- Dave Depper
- Zac Rae

=== Technical ===
- John Congleton – production, engineering
- Sean Cook – additional engineering
- Rachel White – additional engineering
- Jon Roberts – additional tracking on "Trap Door"
- Carlos de la Garza – mixing
- Matt Colton – mastering

== Charts ==
Chart performance for I Built You a Tower
Chart (2026)	Peak position
Australian Albums (ARIA)	55
Austrian Albums (Ö3 Austria)	66
French Physical Albums (SNEP)	165
French Rock & Metal Albums (SNEP)	52
German Albums (Offizielle Top 100)	65
German Rock & Metal Albums (Offizielle Top 100)	20
Irish Independent Albums (IRMA)	20
Japanese Download Albums (Billboard Japan)	88
Scottish Albums (Official Charts)	12
UK Albums (Official Charts)	89
UK Independent Albums (Official Charts)	7
US Billboard 200	80
US Independent Albums (Billboard)	14
US Top Rock & Alternative Albums (Billboard)	21
