= Northern Lights (Death Cab for Cutie song) =

Single by Death Cab for Cutie

from the album Thank You for Today
- Released: November 16, 2018
- Length: 3:56
- Label: Atlantic
- Songwriter: Ben Gibbard
- Producer: Rich Costey

Death Cab for Cutie singles chronology
"I Dreamt We Spoke Again" (2018)	"Northern Lights" (2018)	"When We Drive" (2019)

"Northern Lights" is a song recorded by the American rock band Death Cab for Cutie for their seventh studio album, Thank You for Today (2018). It was released as the third single from Thank You for Today on November 16, 2018, through Atlantic Records.

== Background ==
"Northern Lights" is one of many tracks on Thank You for Today that coincidentally use seasons as metaphors for titles, alongside "Summer Years" and "Autumn Love". In the tune, Gibbard mentions Dyes Inlet, an inlet in western Washington, near Bremerton, where Gibbard grew up. In one live performance of the song, Gibbard dedicated the song to those living in Bremerton. In writing the track, Gibbard wanted to "write a song that was like a John Hughes movie that takes place in my hometown, about two people in this suburban wasteland with nothing to do who spend their time on this body of water, one pining for the other, yet both knowing that this place will be a temporary stop in a much longer life." The song features guest vocals from CHVRCHES vocalist Lauren Mayberry. Bassist Nick Harmer recalled that "She’s just got such great energy and her voice is incredible. She strolled into the studio one afternoon and just nailed it." Mayberry has since performed the song live with the band; their first time together was at the Anthem in Washington, D.C., on October 17, 2018.

== Release and reception ==
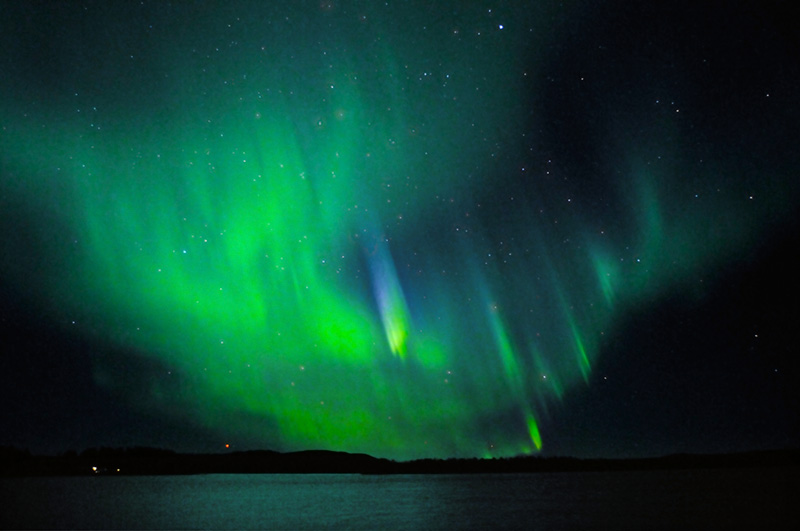
The song references the aurora borealis.

The song became the band's sixth number one hit on Billboard's Adult Alternative Songs chart; the song rose to the position in the week ending February 9, 2019. The band promoted the song with a performance on Late Night with Seth Meyers on January 22, 2019.

"Northern Lights" received positive reviews from contemporary music critics. Tyler Clark at Consequence felt Mayberry's guest spot ruled the song in a good way, while Joseph Longo at Entertainment Weekly felt her appearance boosts the tune "with a much-needed buoyancy." Kory Grow of Rolling Stone considered it evocative of Joy Division or U2, and Jeff Terich at Spin felt it more vital or "immediate" than other moments on the album. Ian Cohen, writing for Uproxx, opined that the song was "the least grating but also the most anodyne single" the band could have picked for the LP.

== Charts ==
Chart performance for "Northern Lights"
Chart (2018–2019)	Peak position
Canada Rock (Billboard)	19
US Hot Rock & Alternative Songs (Billboard)	27
