= Black Sun (Death Cab for Cutie song) =

Single by Death Cab for Cutie

from the album Kintsugi
- Released: January 26, 2015
- Recorded: 2014
- Genre: Indie rock; post-punk revival
- Length: 4:49
- Label: Atlantic, Barsuk
- Songwriter: Ben Gibbard
- Producer: Rich Costey

Death Cab for Cutie singles chronology
"Underneath the Sycamore" (2012)	"Black Sun" (2015)	"The Ghosts of Beverly Drive" (2015)

"Black Sun" is a song by American indie rock band Death Cab for Cutie, released on January 26, 2015. It is the lead single from their eighth studio album Kintsugi.

== Charts ==
=== Weekly charts ===
Chart (2015)	Peak position
Canada Rock (Billboard)	19
US Bubbling Under Hot 100 (Billboard)	14
US Hot Rock & Alternative Songs (Billboard)	12
US Rock & Alternative Airplay (Billboard)	4

=== Year-end charts ===
Chart (2015)	Position
US Hot Rock Songs (Billboard)	42
US Rock Airplay Songs (Billboard)	12

== See also ==
- List of Billboard number-one adult alternative singles of the 2010s
