= Million Dollar Loan =

Single by Death Cab for Cutie

from the album 30 Days, 30 Songs
- Released: October 10, 2016
- Recorded: 2016
- Genre: Indie pop
- Length: 4:38
- Label: Atlantic
- Songwriter: Ben Gibbard

Death Cab for Cutie singles chronology
"Good Help (Is So Hard to Find)" (2016)	"Million Dollar Loan" (2016)	"Gold Rush" (2018)

"Million Dollar Loan" is a song by American rock band Death Cab for Cutie. It was released on October 10, 2016, as the first song in the Dave Eggers-headed project 30 Days, 30 Songs. Like the other songs in the project, the song lyrically takes aim at Donald Trump, the Republican nominee for president in the country's 2016 election. The project aimed to release one song every day from October 10 until Election Day, all of which are, according to its website, "written and recorded by musicians for a Trump-free America." It is the band's first new song since the 2015 album Kintsugi.

== Composition ==
In a statement, Death Cab for Cutie's singer and songwriter Ben Gibbard explained why he wrote the song:

Lyrically, 'Million Dollar Loan' deals with a particularly tone deaf moment in Donald Trump's ascent to the Republican nomination. While campaigning in New Hampshire last year, he attempted to cast himself as a self-made man by claiming he built his fortune with just a 'small loan of a million dollars' from his father. Not only has this statement been proven to be wildly untrue, he was so flippant about it. It truly disgusted me. Donald Trump has repeatedly demonstrated that he is unworthy of the honor and responsibility of being President of the United States of America, and in no way, shape or form represents what this country truly stands for. He is beneath us.

== Music video ==
A music video was also made for the song to coincide with its release, in which a wall is gradually built around Trump. The video was directed by Kyle Cogan of Simian Design.
