= Cath... =

Single by Death Cab for Cutie

from the album Narrow Stairs
- B-side: "Styrofoam Plates (Daytrotter Sessions)"
- Released: July 21, 2008
- Recorded: 2007
- Genre: Indie rock
- Length: 3:50
- Label: Atlantic, Barsuk
- Songwriter: Ben Gibbard
- Producer: Chris Walla

Death Cab for Cutie singles chronology
| "I Will Possess Your Heart" (2008) | "Cath..." (2008) | "No Sunlight" (2008) |

Audio sample
- file; help

"Cath..." is a song by American indie rock band Death Cab for Cutie, the second single from their sixth studio album, Narrow Stairs, released on July 21, 2008, in the United Kingdom as a 7" single.

The song did not earn placement on many worldwide charts or the main U.S. Billboard Hot 100 pop chart, but it managed to reach number ten on the U.S. Modern Rock Tracks chart.

== Music video ==
The music video of the song was directed by Autumn de Wilde. The video reflects the song's lyrics, and the story they tell: A woman named "Cath" (portrayed by Beth Riesgraf) is about to be wed to a "well-intentioned man," yet she does not love him, and is still infatuated with a former love (portrayed by Lukas Haas) who watches the ceremony. The video was inspired by Emily Brontë's famous novel Wuthering Heights, reflecting Catherine Earnshaw and her torment over marrying Edgar Linton (the "well-intentioned man") when she loves Heathcliff. The band is occasionally shown sitting in what seems to be a dressing room with a grassy floor, with all four members mouthing the lyrics to the song.

For promotion, the video was available for remixing on MTV's online video mixer.

== Track listing ==
UK 7" vinyl

1. "Cath..."
2. "Styrofoam Plates" (Daytrotter Sessions)

U.S. promo CD single

1. "Cath..." (Radio edit)
2. "Cath..."

== Charts ==
| Chart (2008) | Peak position |
|---|---|
| Canada Rock (Billboard) | 35 |
| US Alternative Airplay (Billboard) | 10 |
