= Thank You for Today =

Studio album by Death Cab for Cutie
- Released: August 17, 2018
- Studio: Santa Monica, California
- Genres: Alternative rock; indie pop; synth-pop; indie rock
- Length: 38:30
- Label: Atlantic
- Producer: Rich Costey

Death Cab for Cutie chronology
Kintsugi (2015)	Thank You for Today (2018)	The Blue EP (2019)

Singles from Thank You for Today
- 1. "Gold Rush" Released: June 13, 2018; 2. "I Dreamt We Spoke Again" Released: July 19, 2018; 3. "Autumn Love" Released: August 1, 2018

Thank You for Today is the ninth studio album by American indie rock band Death Cab for Cutie. The album was released on August 17, 2018, on Atlantic Records.

== Production and release ==
The album was produced by Rich Costey, who returns after collaborating with the band on their eighth album, Kintsugi. It is the first Death Cab for Cutie release not to feature Chris Walla since the band's first album, You Can Play These Songs with Chords. The album also marks the first time guitarist/keyboardists Dave Depper and Zac Rae have appeared on a Death Cab for Cutie album, after making their debut recording with the band on the 2016 single "Million Dollar Loan".

The album was announced on June 13, 2018, along with the release of its first single, "Gold Rush". The band also announced a tour to support the album's release, beginning in fall 2018. Two further singles were released from the album prior to its release: "I Dreamt We Spoke Again" and "Autumn Love". On August 13, the album was streamed in full on NPR Music's website. "Gold Rush" was also included in the EA Sports video game FIFA 19.

The album is dedicated to the memory of Scott Hutchison, frontman for the Scottish folk rock band Frightened Rabbit, who died in May 2018. Death Cab for Cutie singer Ben Gibbard was a friend of Hutchison and an admirer of his songwriting, and the two bands had toured together in 2008.

== Critical reception ==
Professional ratings
Aggregate scores
Source	Rating
AnyDecentMusic?	6.5/10
Metacritic	69/100
Review scores
Source	Rating
AllMusic	3.5/5 stars
The A.V. Club	B−
Entertainment Weekly	C+
The Guardian	4/5 stars
The Independent	4/5 stars
NME	3/5 stars
Pitchfork	6.0/10
Q	4/5 stars
Rolling Stone	3.5/5 stars
Uncut	7/10

Thank You for Today currently holds a Metacritic score of 69, indicating generally favorable reviews. Madison Desler of Paste Magazine praised the album, describing it as "a fresh take on Death Cab's familiar sound" and "another fine stop in Death Cab's ongoing evolution." The Guardian's Michael Hann was also positive in his four-star review, noting: "The melodies are gorgeous, never overdone but always foregrounded: you would get almost nothing from the individual elements, from the bass, the guitar, the keyboards and the voice, but they add up to much more than the sum of their parts."

Other reviews were more mixed in their reception, such as Pitchfork's Larry Fitzmaurice. His review acknowledged that while Thank You for Today was "the strongest Death Cab album of the 2010s," he also described that title as "a dubious achievement" and noted "there’s moments that suggest Gibbard and the rest of Death Cab are still struggling through the beige malaise that has cast a pall over their more recent work." Writing for Entertainment Weekly, Joseph Longo described Thank You for Today as the band's "midlife crisis record," adding: "...what once exuded cathartic melancholia has now matured into overwrought melodrama."

In a negative review of the album, Tyler Clark from Consequence of Sound criticised the production and the songwriting on the album. Noting that the album is Gibbard's first since he turned 40, Clark says that "without the will or ability to eschew generalities for details, he leaves his anti-gentrification songs undercooked and his middle-aged musings feeling perfunctory and safe."

== Track listing ==
All tracks are written by Ben Gibbard, except where noted.

No.	Title	Music	Length
1.	"I Dreamt We Spoke Again"		3:04
2.	"Summer Years"	Gibbard, Jason McGerr	4:28
3.	"Gold Rush"	Gibbard, Dave Depper, Yoko Ono	4:00
4.	"Your Hurricane"		3:18
5.	"When We Drive"		3:49
6.	"Autumn Love"		4:18
7.	"Northern Lights"		3:56
8.	"You Moved Away"		3:49
9.	"Near/Far"		3:41
10.	"60 & Punk"		4:07
Total length:			38:30

Japanese bonus track
No.	Title	Length
11.	"Autumn Love" (Demo Version)	7:45
Total length:		46:23

== Personnel ==
Death Cab for Cutie

- Benjamin Gibbard – lead vocals, backing vocals, guitars, piano, keyboards, samples
- Nick Harmer – bass, backing vocals on "Gold Rush"
- Jason McGerr – drums, percussion, programming
- Dave Depper – guitars, keyboards, backing vocals
- Zac Rae – keyboards, guitars, backing vocals on "Gold Rush"

Additional personnel

- Lauren Mayberry – additional vocals on "Northern Lights"
- Rich Costey – production

== Charts ==
Chart (2018)	Peak position
Australian Albums (ARIA)	55
Austrian Albums (Ö3 Austria)	73
Belgian Albums (Ultratop Flanders)	44
Canadian Albums (Billboard)	21
Dutch Albums (Album Top 100)	62
German Albums (Offizielle Top 100)	53
Irish Albums (IRMA)	57
Japanese Albums (Oricon)	140
Scottish Albums (Official Charts)	14
Swedish Vinyl Albums (Sverigetopplistan)	7
Spanish Albums (PROMUSICAE)	56
Swiss Albums (Schweizer Hitparade)	44
UK Albums (Official Charts)	24
US Billboard 200	13
