= Narrow Stairs =

Studio album by Death Cab for Cutie
- Released: May 12, 2008
- Studio: Robert Lang (Shoreline, Washington)
- Genres: Indie rock; indie pop; art rock; alternative rock
- Length: 44:50
- Labels: Atlantic; Barsuk
- Producer: Chris Walla

Death Cab for Cutie chronology
Plans (2005)	Narrow Stairs (2008)	The Open Door EP (2009)

Singles from Narrow Stairs
- 1. "I Will Possess Your Heart" Released: March 17, 2008; 2. "Cath..." Released: July 21, 2008; 3. "No Sunlight" Released: November 17, 2008; 4. "Grapevine Fires" Released: February 3, 2009

Narrow Stairs is the sixth studio album by indie rock band Death Cab for Cutie, released on May 12, 2008, in the United Kingdom and on May 13, 2008, in the United States, on Atlantic and Barsuk Records.

Four singles were released for the album: "I Will Possess Your Heart", "Cath...", "No Sunlight", and "Grapevine Fires". "I Will Possess Your Heart" reached number six on the US Alternative Songs chart, was named iTunes UK song of the year 2008, and was nominated for the 2009 Grammy Award for Best Rock Song. "Cath..." and "Grapevine Fires", also reached number ten and number twenty-one on the US Alternative Songs chart, respectively.

Narrow Stairs reached number one on the Billboard 200, making it Death Cab for Cutie's highest charting album and only number one record.

== Recording and production ==
In October 2007, producer and guitarist Chris Walla said that Death Cab for Cutie's new album "is in full swing; we're six songs in." He went on to say, "thus far it's pretty weird and pretty spectacular; lots of blood. It's creepy and heavy... we've got a ten minute long Can jam, and had you suggested that possibility to me in 1998, I'd have eaten your puppy's brain with a spoon." In a Billboard piece, Walla described the album: "It's really weird. It's really, really good, I think, but it's totally a curve ball, and I think it's gonna be a really polarizing record. But I'm really excited about it. It's really got some teeth. The landscape of the thing is way, way more lunar than the urban meadow sort of thing that has been happening for the last couple of records." Walla went on to say, "[It's also] louder and more dissonant and [...] I think abrasive would be a good word to use. [We were influenced by] heavy, sludgy, slow metal [and] synth-punk band Brainiac." Ben Gibbard, lead singer and writer, commented, "I just don't feel like we really have anything to prove of it other than to ourselves and to making a record we really enjoy."

In 2011 Walla stated, "the master plan for Narrow Stairs was to be as invisible and hands-off as a producer as I possibly could. I was really interested in seeing what would happen. When we started that record, we had been on tour for the better part of two years. All we could remember was being on stage and playing. So the whole idea was: what happens if we’re just on stage and we play, except we’re in the studio and we’re recording?" Walla added "Narrow Stairs was very much a commitment to just crashing through the songs as we recorded them, like four people in a room."

== Writing and composition ==
While promoting the band's subsequent album, Codes and Keys (2011), Benjamin Gibbard reflected upon Narrow Stairs' lyrical content, stating, "That record is kind of a fulcrum in my life. So much of the negativity in my life got funneled into it. I realized after that I didn't want to go any darker. I wanted it to be the bottom for this band and my own emotional spectrum in terms of writing. I had no grandiose plans to turn my life around."

== Notes ==
Several of the songs have literary or cultural themes, for example "Grapevine Fires" appears to be centered on the wildfires that raged in California during the summer and fall of 2007.

"Bixby Canyon Bridge" features many references to writer Jack Kerouac, whom Ben Gibbard often notes as a favorite author in interviews, and the song was written during a trip to Big Sur, the location of Bixby Creek Bridge. Gibbard has written lyrics referencing Kerouac before, including the songs "Lowell, MA" and "Title Track" from Death Cab for Cutie's 2000 album, We Have the Facts and We're Voting Yes, and his contribution of lyrics and vocals to a song by Styrofoam titled "Couches in Alleys".

"Pity and Fear" features an abrupt ending where the song finishes without warning during an instrumental. In an interview, the band stated that the tape machine they were using broke toward the end, however the band liked it so much that they included it in the final version of the song.

The final track on the album, "The Ice Is Getting Thinner", is used in the first-season finale of the television series Gossip Girl, as well as in the fourth season of reality series The Hills. The song "No Sunlight" is included in the soundtrack for Choke. "Pity and Fear" was included in the ending of an episode of CSI: Crime Scene Investigation. The first track, "Bixby Canyon Bridge", was used at the end of the Friday Night Lights episode, "How the Other Side Lives".

The cover art was created by designer EE Storey, the art director for Tegan and Sara.

== Critical reception ==
Professional ratings
Aggregate scores
Source	Rating
Metacritic	73/100
Review scores
Source	Rating
AllMusic	4/5 stars
The A.V. Club	A
Entertainment Weekly	B
The Guardian	4/5 stars
The Independent	4/5 stars
Mojo	3/5 stars
Pitchfork	6.0/10
Q	3/5 stars
Rolling Stone	4/5 stars
Spin	4/5 stars

The album holds a score of 73 out of 100 from Metacritic based on "generally favorable reviews". MTV's James Montgomery referred to Narrow Stairs as "unquestionably the best thing [Death Cab has] ever done". Rolling Stone called the album "a dark, strangely compelling record that trades the group's bright melancholy for something nearer to despair." In his Consumer Guide, Robert Christgau gave it a two-star honorable mention, while picking out two songs from the album ("You Can Do Better Than Me" and "Grapevine Fires") and stating that the album has "Unfailingly melodic, surprisingly dynamic, somewhat overextended love problems, and if [Ben is] so smart why doesn't he shelve music and solve them?"

The album has been highly rated by critics and fans, having been awarded 4 stars out of 5 by publications such as Rolling Stone, Blender Kerrang!, Uncut, Alternative Press, The Times, The Observer, The Independent and The Guardian, as well as by the websites AllMusic and Consequence of Sound, and Tiny Mix Tapes. TIME magazine awarded the album a "B+" rating, with The A.V. Club giving it an "A" rating. Boston radio station WERS ranked Narrow Stairs as the No.8 album of 2008 based on a listener poll. Even more favorable reviews come from such publishers as Under the Radar (with nine stars out of ten), Billboard, The Boston Globe, Hartford Courant, Paste (seven out of ten), and Filter (70%).

Other reviews that are given three stars out of five are Mojo, Q, Now, and Prefix Magazine (six out of ten), as well as the website Sputnikmusic. Publishers that have mixed reviews are Slant Magazine (two-and-a-half stars out of five), Hot Press (2.5 out of five), The Austin Chronicle (two stars out of five), and The Village Voice.

== Commercial performance ==
In its debut week, Narrow Stairs reached the No.1 spot on the Billboard 200 chart, selling 144,000 copies and scoring the band its first No.1 album. One week later it fell to No.5 with 52,000 copies. As of January 31, 2009, the album had sold over 475,000 copies in the US. Narrow Stairs was certified Gold by the RIAA in February 2009, for shipments of 500,000 copies.

Narrow Stairs was nominated for Best Alternative Music Album at the 51st Grammy Awards, while "I Will Possess Your Heart" was nominated for Best Rock Song.

== Track listing ==
No.	Title	Writer(s)	Length
1.	"Bixby Canyon Bridge"	Ben Gibbard	5:15
2.	"I Will Possess Your Heart"	Gibbard, Nick Harmer, Jason McGerr, Chris Walla	8:25
3.	"No Sunlight"	Gibbard, Walla	2:40
4.	"Cath..."	Gibbard	3:50
5.	"Talking Bird"	Gibbard	3:23
6.	"You Can Do Better Than Me"	Gibbard	1:59
7.	"Grapevine Fires"	Gibbard, Harmer, McGerr	4:09
8.	"Your New Twin Sized Bed"	Gibbard, Harmer	3:06
9.	"Long Division"	Gibbard, Harmer, Walla	3:50
10.	"Pity and Fear"	Gibbard	4:21
11.	"The Ice Is Getting Thinner"	Gibbard, Walla	3:45

iTunes Store bonus tracks
No.	Title	Writer(s)	Length
12.	"I Will Possess Your Heart" (radio edit)	Gibbard, Harmer, McGerr, Walla	4:08
13.	"Album Credits" (As Read by Mike West)		2:51
14.	"The Ice Is Getting Thinner" (Demo)	Gibbard, Walla	3:30
15.	"No Sunlight" (Demo)	Gibbard, Walla	3:25

The latter two demos were also included on the vinyl LP edition of the album.

== Personnel ==
Death Cab for Cutie

- Ben Gibbard – vocals, rhythm guitar, piano, keyboard, drums, drum machine
- Nick Harmer – bass, backing vocals
- Jason McGerr – drums, percussion
- Chris Walla – lead guitar, audio sequencer, backing vocals, piano, keyboard

Production

- Chris Walla – production, recording, mixing
- Eric A. Hegg – centerfold photo
- Alex Newport – mixing
- Chris Tabron – mixing assistant
- Roger Seibel – mastering
- EE Storey – artwork, layout

== Charts ==
=== Weekly charts ===
Chart (2008)	Peak position
Australian Albums (ARIA)	6
Austrian Albums (Ö3 Austria)	65
Belgian Albums (Ultratop Flanders)	61
Canadian Albums (Billboard)	1
Dutch Albums (Album Top 100)	67
German Albums (Offizielle Top 100)	40
Irish Albums (IRMA)	29
New Zealand Albums (RMNZ)	35
Norwegian Albums (VG-lista)	10
Scottish Albums (Official Charts)	26
Spanish Albums (Promusicae)	99
Swedish Albums (Sverigetopplistan)	16
UK Albums (Official Charts)	24
US Billboard 200	1
US Top Rock Albums (Billboard)	1

=== Year-end charts ===
Chart (2008)	Position
US Billboard 200	94
US Top Rock Albums (Billboard)	22

== Certifications ==
Region	Certification	Certified units/sales
Canada (Music Canada)	Gold	40,000^{^}
United Kingdom (BPI)	Silver	60,000^{‡}
United States (RIAA)	Gold	500,000^{^}
^{^} Shipments figures based on certification alone.^{‡} Sales+streaming figures based on certification alone.

== Release history ==
The album was initially released on May 12, 2008, in the United Kingdom and on the following day in the United States.
