= Death Cab for Cutie =

American rock band

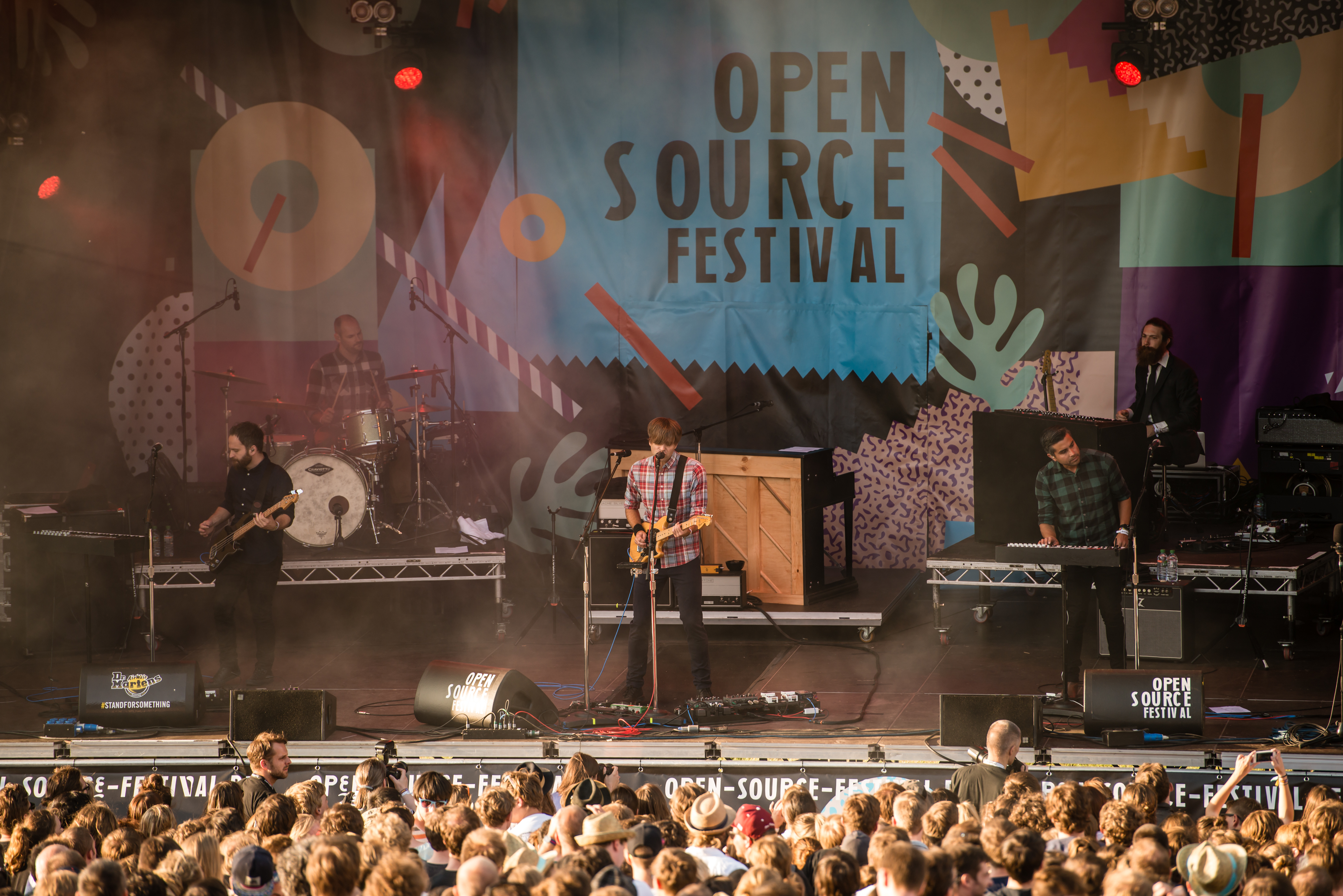
- Death Cab for Cutie performing in Düsseldorf, 2015

Background information
- Origin: Bellingham, Washington, United States
- Genres: Alternative rock; indie pop; indie rock; emo (early)
- Years active: 1997–present
- Labels: Warner Music; Atlantic; Barsuk; Fierce Panda; Sub Pop; Grand Hotel van Cleef; ANTI-
- Spinoffs: The Postal Service; The Revolutionary Hydra
- Spinoff of: ¡All-Time Quarterback!; Eureka Farm; Pinwheel
- Members: Ben Gibbard; Nick Harmer; Jason McGerr; Dave Depper; Zac Rae
- Past members: Nathan Good; Jayson Tolzdorf-Larson; Michael Schorr; Chris Walla
- Website: deathcabforcutie.com

Death Cab for Cutie (commonly abbreviated to DCFC or Death Cab) is an American rock band formed in Bellingham, Washington, in 1997. The band is composed of Ben Gibbard (vocals, guitar, piano), Nick Harmer (bass), Dave Depper (guitar, keyboards, backing vocals), Zac Rae (keyboards, guitar), and Jason McGerr (drums). The band is known for a melodic sound that blends indie rock, indie pop, and alternative rock, characterized by sensitive, introspective songwriting.

Death Cab for Cutie emerged from the Pacific Northwest in the late 1990s, spearheaded by singer-songwriter Gibbard alongside original guitarist and producer Chris Walla. The group refined their sound on early releases including Something About Airplanes (1998), We Have the Facts and We're Voting Yes (2000), and The Photo Album (2001). Their 2003 album Transatlanticism marked a commercial and critical breakthrough, and, along with the major-label debut Plans (2005), helped bring indie rock into the mainstream. Subsequent albums such as the chart-topping Narrow Stairs (2008) and Codes and Keys (2011) saw the band further diversify their sound. Walla departed prior to the release of Kintsugi (2015). The band later released Thank You for Today (2018) and Asphalt Meadows (2022). Their eleventh album, I Built You a Tower, was released in 2026.

Over a career spanning more than three decades, Death Cab for Cutie have been described as "one of the definitive indie bands of the 2000s and 2010s". They were one of the major bands associated with the rise of indie rock, with their 2000s-era output producing several platinum-selling albums and charting singles. The band has received numerous accolades, including multiple Grammy Award nominations.

== History ==
=== Formation and origins (1995–1997) ===
Death Cab for Cutie emerged in the late 1990s out of the Pacific Northwest independent music scene, spearheaded by singer-songwriter Ben Gibbard. The group first formed in Bellingham, Washington, a small college town north of Seattle, in 1997. Gibbard was studying at Western Washington University and had been performing for many years in the pop-punk group Pinwheel, but began to write songs he felt were unsuitable for the project. Bassist Nick Harmer, a year older, was booking campus gigs when he first met Gibbard. Gibbard and Harmer first got their start in a band called Shed, which later became the band Eureka Farm; Harmer and future Death Cab drummer Jason McGerr rounded out a later lineup. Gibbard met guitarist and producer Chris Walla at a concert, and the two bonded over shared interests. Walla, who was writing songs himself and taking audio engineering classes, offered to help record demos on the weekends, using a Tascam 80–8 reel-to-reel recorder. After a year, they decided to develop the project into a full-fledged band.

Gibbard took the band name from the song "Death Cab for Cutie", which was written by Neil Innes and Vivian Stanshall and recorded by their group the Bonzo Dog Doo-Dah Band. The song is a track on the Bonzo's 1967 debut album, Gorilla, and was performed by them in the Beatles film Magical Mystery Tour. The title was originally that of a story in an old pulp fiction crime magazine that Innes came across in a street market. In a later interview, Gibbard expressed ambivalence over the name, suggesting that had he known the band would become successful he might have given it a better band name.

They compiled a cassette-only demo album, titled You Can Play These Songs with Chords, pressing up 150 copies to sell around the small town. They partnered with a small label ran by friends called Elsinor Records for the release. Shortly after completing the cassette, they assembled a provisional lineup to play a house show, which took place at the Pacer House in Bellingham on November 22, 1997, featuring Gibbard, Walla, Harmer, and drummer Nathan Good, a friend of Walla's. The band signed a handshake deal with local boutique label Barsuk Records—essentially a then "one-man operation" ran by founder Josh Rosenfield, a friend of the band, and of Elsinor, who remained involved. Rosenfield's goal was to establish an artist-friendly approach, with the band initially receiving a generous 80/20 share of the profits. Overseas distribution in this era was handled by several indie imprints across the globe, first Architecture Label in Australia, then Fierce Panda in the United Kingdom and Toy's Factory in Japan. You Can Play These Songs with Chords was later expanded with ten more songs and re-released in 2002 by Barsuk, alongside Gibbard's early work under the name All-Time Quarterback.

=== Early years (1998–2000) ===
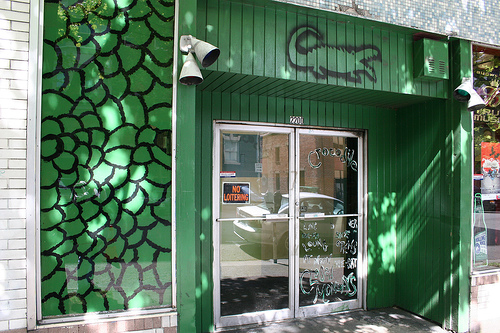
A sold-out gig at the Crocodile Cafe in Seattle was an early highlight.

The four released their debut album, Something About Airplanes, on August 18, 1998. Airplanes was created at the group's rented bungalow off of Ellis Street in Bellingham. With Walla's bedroom in the attic, the band inserted a microphone through a hole in the floor to the living room where vocals were tracked on the Tascam. It was an embryonic, anonymous time for the trio: given space to experiment and fail, they began to forge an identity though trial and error. Gibbard's singing voice is more adenoidal in tone, and his songwriting ranges from descriptive but obtuse. The album performed well locally, and led to a sold-out show in December 1998 at the Crocodile Cafe—an early highlight for the young artists. (It was recorded, and later issued on an expanded edition of Airplanes).

Their early years were a homespun, DIY affair: in addition to recording, Walla handled T-shirt designs, and Harmer's mother offered the band a loan on their first van, a Ford Econoline, enabling them to tour. The band slept on strangers' floors and ate mustard sandwiches to survive, with any money the band made at sparsely-attended gigs going towards fueling the van to drive to the next city. They once drove two days straight from Bellingham to Austin, Texas to make it to a South by Southwest showcase. They also dealt with lineup changes. Good departed in January 1999 to focus on personal matters. In mid-1999, the group relocated to Seattle to pursue music in earnest. It was a demanding period, with the band more spread out physically than before, bound by financial obligations to live in the city. The lack of a consistent percussionist hindered matters too—an interim replacement, Jayson Tolzdorf-Larson, had failed to work out—and there was the real possibility of the band splitting. They asked McGerr to step in on drums, but he declined. Though Gibbard has characterized this period in the group's biography as "interstitial" and lacking assurance of what was to come, they overall began to feel more experienced.

=== Underground breakthroughs (2000–2002) ===
At the onset of the aughts, the band's work was met with increasing listenership and industry attention. Though the band were largely outsiders to the music industry, their work was supported by college radio stations and set the band on a trajectory of success. Meanwhile, the band set out to work on their second album: We Have the Facts and We're Voting Yes, released in 2000. Like its predecessor, it was recorded in a home environment rather than professional studio spaces, with Walla acquiring more professional recording equipment. Gibbard's songwriting began to evolve, possessing a more novelistic approach and frequently using full sentences. His self-described "post-collegiate neuroses" informed its downbeat and despondent tone, leading many observers to lump the band as a part of the burgeoning emo scene. To that point, the band once considered signing to Jade Tree, the Delaware imprint that hosted many emo acts, but passed on it. By 2000, Barsuk had transformed into a company proper, shifting its profit margin with the band to a more realistic 60/40 split due to overhead expenses. The label purchased a historic studio in the city, previously known as Reciprocal, allowing Walla to manage the space, which he named Hall of Justice. It served as a recording space for the band for their next several albums, and functioned as a practice space later on.

The trio had struggled to find a suitable and "competent" percussionist who would agree to tour, and settled on drummer Michael Schorr, formerly of Uncle Roscoe. Schorr made his debut on the band's next release, the follow-up The Forbidden Love EP, which began to take the band to new levels of success: they started receiving national attention, with both The Washington Post and Spin ranking the EP among its top-ten lists in 2000. The band's next effort, The Photo Album (2001), became their biggest yet: it sold over 50,000 records at that time (unprecedented for a band of their size), and single "A Movie Script Ending", a tip to their Bellingham roots, became their first to chart and receive a music video. Despite these accomplishments, the band began suffering from internal tension. The album's creation was rushed: each band member had recently left their day jobs, with the band now their primary source of income for the first time. The group had disagreements with Schorr, and Walla—who enjoyed recording music more than performing it—was feeling exhausted by the entire experience. It culminated in a bitter fight at a tour stop in Baltimore in October 2001 where the band all but separated—one of several near break-ups that year. After commitments were complete, the band took a small hiatus, where they dedicated themselves to forging a new path forward as a band.

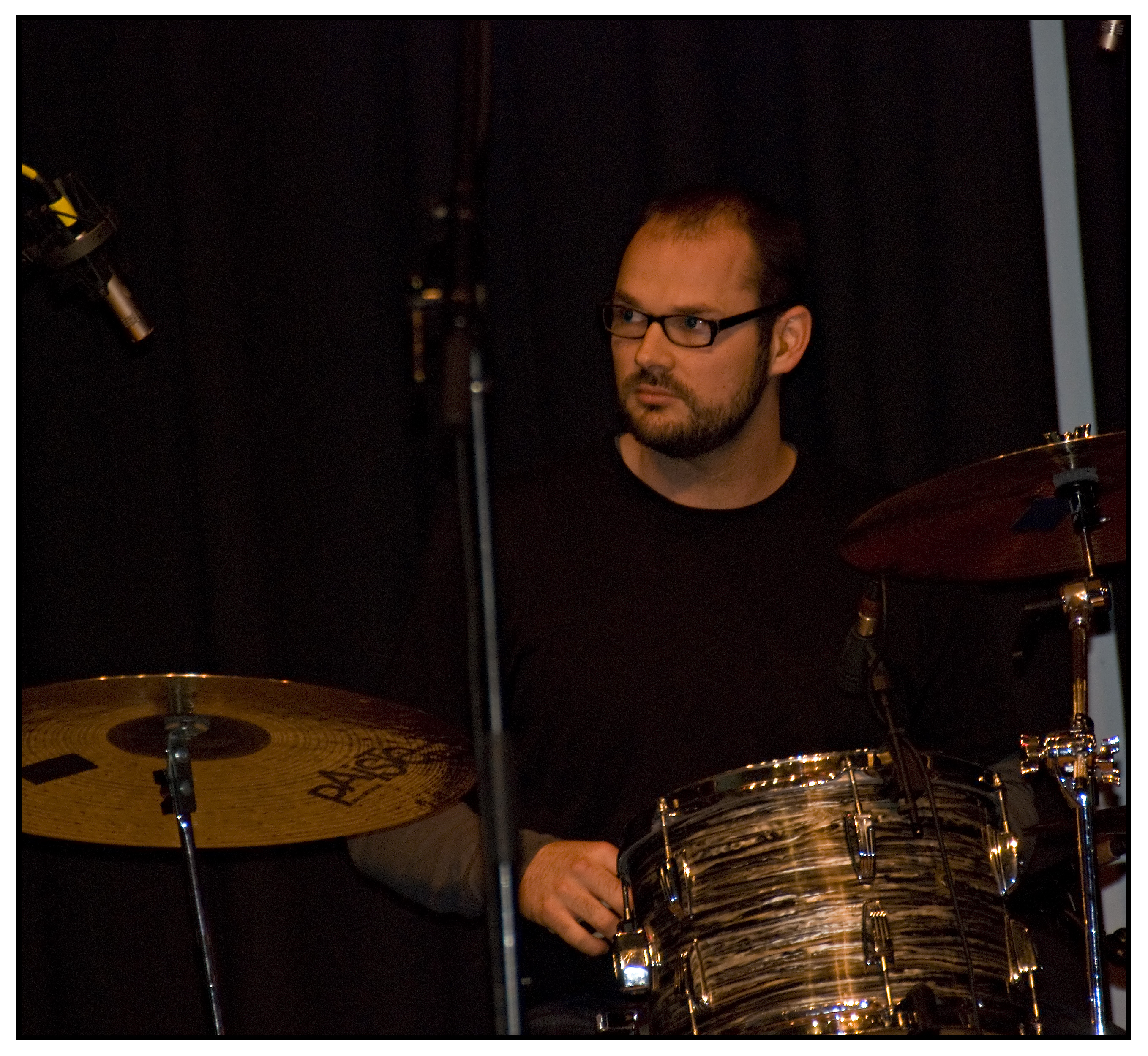
The band Jason McGerr on drums in 2002.

In February 2002, the band partnered with indie-rock band, the Dismemberment Plan, for the well-received Death and Dismemberment tour. It marked a new moment for the group: both bands on the cusp of success, playing mid-sized clubs, touring across the country in a van and staying at motels. The band has frequently remembered the outing with fondness; Harmer and Gibbard have both called it perhaps the high-water mark of that era—the moment that taking the leap to being a full-time band paid off. That same month, the band released The Stability EP, which contained a cover of Bjork's "All Is Full of Love". Later that year, Harmer reconnected with McGerr. Now a drum instructor, McGerr decided to join the trio. In October, the band entered their rehearsal space for the first time with McGerr, who remains behind the kit to this day. His addition brought balance to the lineup, with his calm demeanor settling their dynamics.

During a break in activities, Walla continued to explore his interest in recording, producing albums by the Thermals and the Decemberists. Meanwhile, Gibbard began a collaboration with electronic music artist Dntel (Jimmy Tamborello), which they called The Postal Service. Their sole album, Give Up (released on Sub Pop in 2003), contrasts manipulated samples and keyboards with live guitar and drums—a sound some described as "indietronica". It was released with little promotion—its creators embarked on a brief tour, but otherwise returned to their main projects. But across the 2000s, the album became an unexpected, platinum-selling sleeper hit: its singles charted internationally, and the LP was an enduring presence on dance and independent charts. Its lead single, "Such Great Heights", gained major traction through radio, online buzz, and licensing deals. This experience only served to draw further attention to Gibbard's main band, and set the stage for crossover appeal.

=== Indie ascendance and Transatlanticism (2003–2005) ===
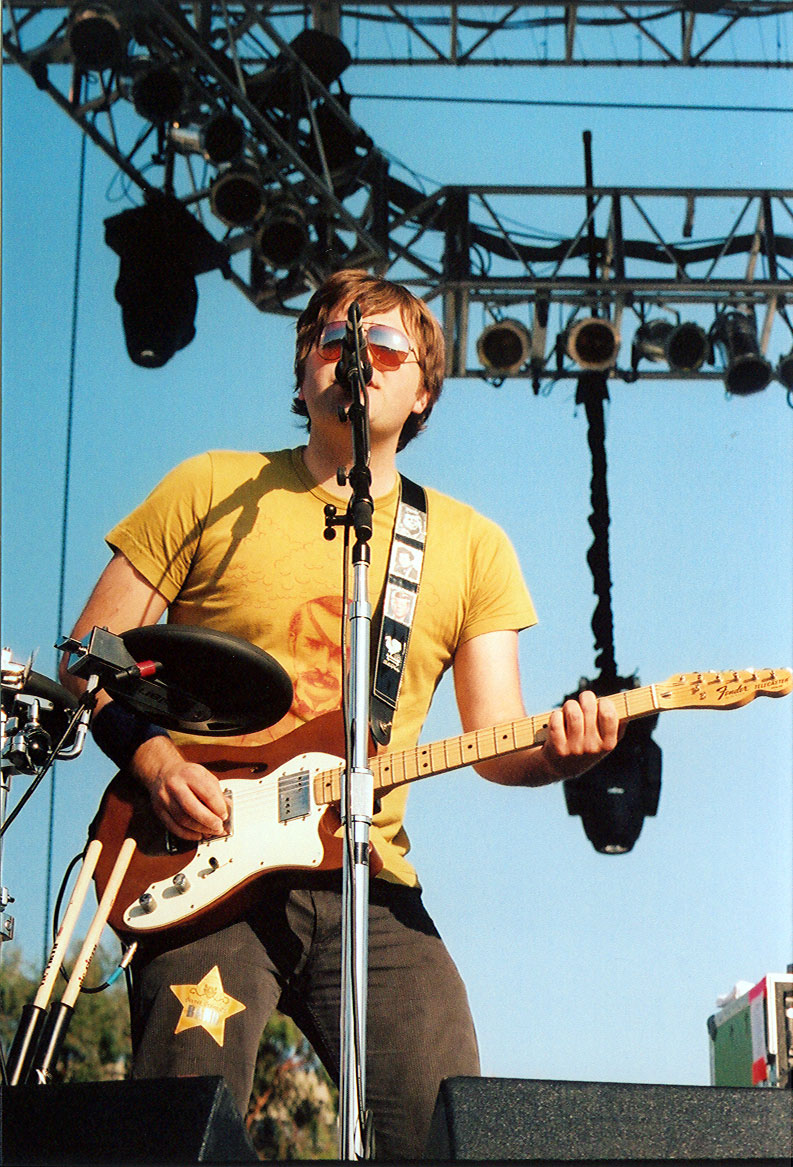
Frontman Ben Gibbard performing in 2005.

The group settled into recording their fourth album, Transatlanticism (2003). With Walla again at the helm, the quartet embraced a collaborative process, often deconstructing and reworking Gibbard's demos to explore new creative directions together. The sessions fostered a positive and creative environment, with the band deliberately spreading sessions across several months and studios to allow a more relaxed, reflective process. Transatlanticism weaves a sonic narrative of isolation, long-distance love, and emotional barriers; it uses ambience and instrumental sparseness as an extension of this theme. The album's title, likewise, references the Atlantic Ocean and uses it as a metaphor for geographic and emotional separation. The album spawned three singles: "The New Year", "The Sound of Settling", and "Title and Registration".

Transatlanticism saw release in October 2003, becoming their first album to chart on Billboard 200. It was met with widespread critical acclaim its emotional depth and lush songwriting. Its sales steadily climbed, eventually surpassing 500,000 copies in two years—a feat music journalist Greg Kot described as "a massive hit by indie-rock standards." It has since been certified platinum by the RIAA. In the interim between albums, the group had licensed its songs for usage on the popular television drama The O.C., which helped introduce them to a wider audience. The group were repeatedly referenced as the favorite band of the character Seth Cohen, and the band later appeared as itself in an episode of the second season, performing in the show's fictional music venue. They became closely associated with the program for a period, both for better (the broader recognition and new fans), and worse (band discomfort and indie backlash).

All of this publicity, plus the wide, concurrent success of the Postal Service, led to considerably higher public interest in the group. They hired their long-time manager, Jordan Kurland, and the next year was spent largely on the road, with the band trading their longtime van for a bus in advance of nonstop touring. They toured throughout late 2003 alongside Nada Surf, The Long Winters, and Mates of State, co-headlining with Ben Kweller in the first part of 2004. In March 2004, the band released a live EP, entitled The John Byrd EP, named for their sound engineer. Pearl Jam invited the band to open for them on that year's Vote for Change tour, and the band concluded the season with another domestic headlining jaunt. The extensive Transatlanticism album cycle and ensuing junket is documented in the film Drive Well, Sleep Carefully by director Justin Mitchell. All of these dates took place Stateside; touring overseas was complicated for the band, as their record label contracts were split between nine different companies there.

The aforementioned distribution issues and the band's rising stardom led them to field offers from major record labels in 2004. The band held allegiance to Barsuk for helping build their careers, and signed a contract for a further three-album deal with the label, so that in the event the majors came calling, Barsuk could also reap the financial benefits. The band, with its softer, sometimes piano-led sound, were drawing comparisons compared to Coldplay, one of the biggest global rock acts at that time, making them an attractive prospect for A&R representatives. The band inked a lucrative long-term contract with Atlantic Records in November 2004. The move suggested a shift in the perception of "indie" bands in the mainstream, and triggered accusations of inauthenticity. The move polarized fans, who took to message boards to worry that creative control would be diminished with the corporate expectations of a major label.

=== Mainstream success (2005–2009): Plans and Narrow Stairs ===
As the band entered into a new phase, they set out to record their major-label debut: Plans (2005). The group recorded the album at a farm studio in rural Massachusetts, taking advantage of their first "industry" budget while aiming to stay frugal and crafting the record as a cohesive, album-oriented experience. Relentless touring had left Gibbard creatively drained, while Walla, who had struggled with his dedication to being in the band, re-committed himself to it. Plans is a reflective, mid-tempo album that meditates on mortality and the impermanence of life's intentions. Though the band publicly claimed nothing would change after signing to a big label, Gibbard later admitted they felt immense pressure, and Harmer acknowledged that while their creative process stayed intact, the psychological weight of those expectations quietly affected them. Confidence for the band's major-label move were high, with the group viewed as poised for a commercial breakthrough. During this period, Barsuk remained involved in their career, with the label's logo appearing on the back cover of Plans, and the label retaining the rights to release vinyl copies of their albums.

The move to a major worked: Plans propelled the band into the mainstream, making Death Cab for Cutie became one of the biggest names in alternative rock. Upon its September 2005 release, it debuted at number four on the Billboard 200, making Death Cab one of the first indie rock bands to score a top five album. "Soul Meets Body" and "Crooked Teeth" became domestic airplay juggernauts, reaching top spots on radio playlists, while "I Will Follow You Into the Dark"—which later went double-platinum—cemented its place among listeners as their biggest hit. Both that single and the album also scored the quartet two Grammy nominations, their first of many. It remains the band's highest-seller; as of 2015, the platinum album has logged 1.2 million copies in the U.S. The album was a favorite among music directors; virtually every song from Plans was licensed for use in film and TV. This success made the group one of the first indie acts to break through on a broad level in the mainstream. The band toured heavily behind Plans, with a North American arena headlining set alongside Youth Group and Stars. The band's 2006 tour grossed $5.9 million, with 31 out of 47 shows selling out according to Billboard Boxscore. During the Plans album cycle, the quartet also made their national television debuts with performances on Late Night with Conan O'Brien in September 2005, and on Saturday Night Live in January 2006. The band also staged a special benefit concert to aid victims of Hurricane Katrina at Seattle's Showbox venue.

By surviving their mainstream breakthrough without losing their identity or bond, the band gained confidence in the next phase of their career. Following major shifts in their personal and professional lives, the creation of their next album, Narrow Stairs (2008), unfolded under notably different and unconventional circumstances. Death Cab had reached an unprecedented level of fame, and the promotional demands surrounding it proved taxing for the band. Gibbard tackled colder, more bleak lyricism, partially informed by alcohol addiction, which he overcame during the making of the album. Among the darkness was its lead single, the hypnotic eight-minute jam "I Will Possess Your Heart"—the story of a stalker and their disturbing expectations. Walla, who again produced the set, described it in a pre-release interview as a "bloody" and "abrasive" record. It was largely tracked live in a messier, more disorganized process, in opposition to the constructive, technical approach to its predecessor. The album spawned two more singles, "Grapevine Fires", and the rock top-10 "Cath...".

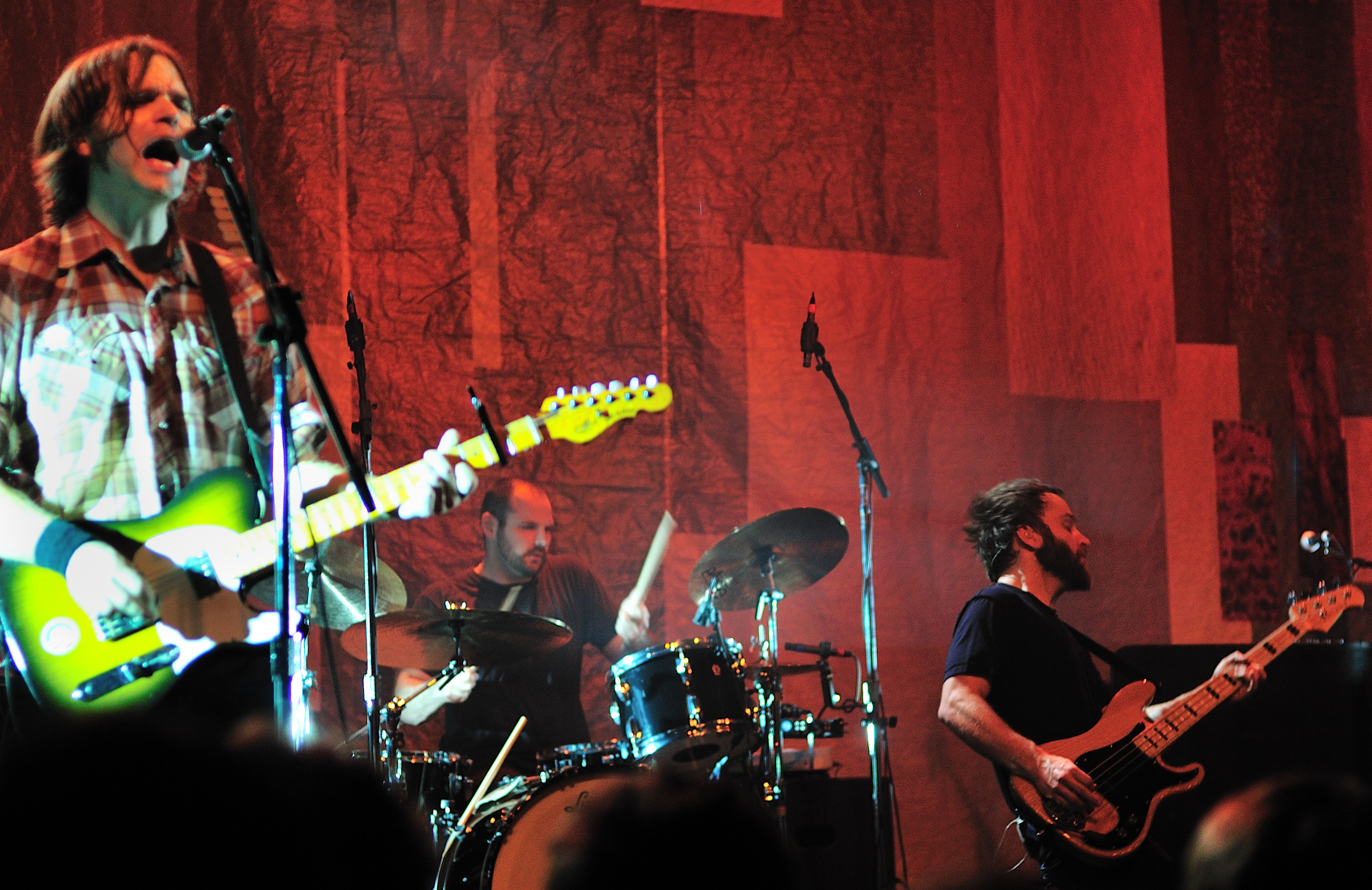
Death Cab for Cutie performing in 2008

Upon its release, Narrow Stairs became their biggest album yet, scaling the summit of the Billboard 200 for the first time. It received positive reviews; the New York Times called it "an unsettling, confident album that reaffirms Death Cab as an increasingly rare thing: a career rock band." The album was certified gold by the RIAA. "Possess" nabbed a nomination for Best Rock Song at the Grammy Awards, with its parent album marking the band's second nod for Best Alternative Music Album. The band lost in both categories, but prompted debate after appearing at the ceremony sporting blue ribbons to protest against what they view as the excessive use of Auto-Tune in the music industry. They toured the U.S. with Rogue Wave and Styrofoam in Europe, playing festivals like Bonnaroo, Sasquatch!, and Coachella along the way. They toured Asia and Australia before hitting the U.S. a second time with St. Vincent and Frightened Rabbit. They also opened for Neil Young. In 2009, they toured the U.S. again with Cold War Kids and Ra Ra Riot as support, and knocked off a five-track EP titled The Open Door. The band capped a year of touring with a Fourth of July gig at the Hollywood Bowl alongside the Los Angeles Philharmonic. Later that year, the band offered "Meet Me on the Equinox" for the soundtrack of the blockbuster film The Twilight Saga: New Moon, which became one of their best-performing singles worldwide.

=== Transitional era (2010–2014) ===
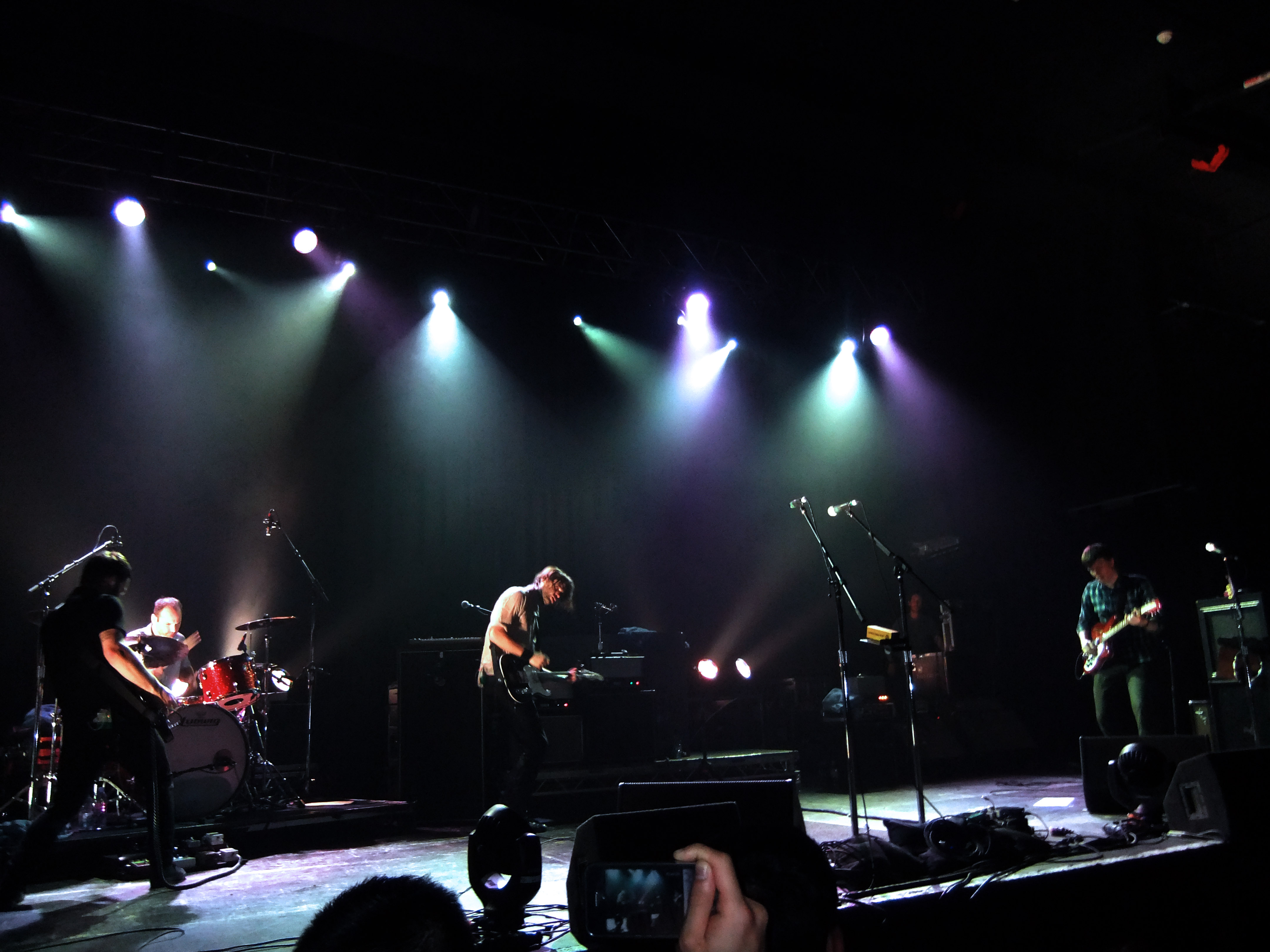
Death Cab for Cutie performing in 2011

The band's next album, the technological Codes and Keys (2011), represented a focus on softer, more ambient instrumentation. Walla was responsible for half of its musical content, and Gibbard moved to piano as his primary songwriting instrument. He adopted a more minimalistic, economic approach to lyrics, aiming to keep things succinct, and began writing more on piano versus guitar, which informed its timbre. During the development of the album, Gibbard wed actress Zooey Deschanel, and relocated to Hollywood. The pairing was subject to press scrutiny and fandom, with one Pitchfork blogger calling it "some kind of fantasy indie rock love connection." The sunnier disposition of Codes and Keys took some critics by surprise, given the darker lyrical nature of past efforts, but the LP garnered generally favorable reviews. "You Are a Tourist", its main single, became the band's first chart-topper on Billboard's Alternative chart, going gold. Like its predecessors, Codes and Keys scored a nomination for Best Alternative Music Album at the 54th Grammy Awards in 2012.

The band has since looked back on the era with mixed feelings; Gibbard in retrospect has felt his lyricism emphasized personal detachment due to his L.A. lifestyle. It preceded a transitional time for the group, coinciding with Gibbard and Deschanel's divorce and his return to Seattle. Death Cab for Cutie announced an expanded North American tour in support of the album, launching in July 2011 and spanning the U.S. and Canada—including festival and headline dates—before concluding at Red Rocks Amphitheatre, with Frightened Rabbit as support. They continued on the road into the next year, mounting a full-scale orchestral tour with the Magik Magik Orchestra, an arrangement captured on the limited live album Live 2012. Gibbard also made a solo album, Former Lives, released through Barsuk that year. He spent most of 2013 celebrating the Postal Service's 10-year anniversary with a long-anticipated reunion tour. The outing was in exceptionally high demand because it marked the group's first live run in nearly a decade. In mid-2013, Death Cab reconvened to work on their eighth studio effort, but Walla found himself less devoted to it. Over the years, he had continued his producing career, helming albums by Tegan and Sara, Youth Group, and Ra Ra Riot, among others. He described feeling artistically at odds during production, and suggested hiring an outside producer, a first for the quartet. The band recruited veteran rock producer Rich Costey, known for his work with Muse and Foster the People. Costey introduced a bigger, glossier, more modern productive style to the band's palette.

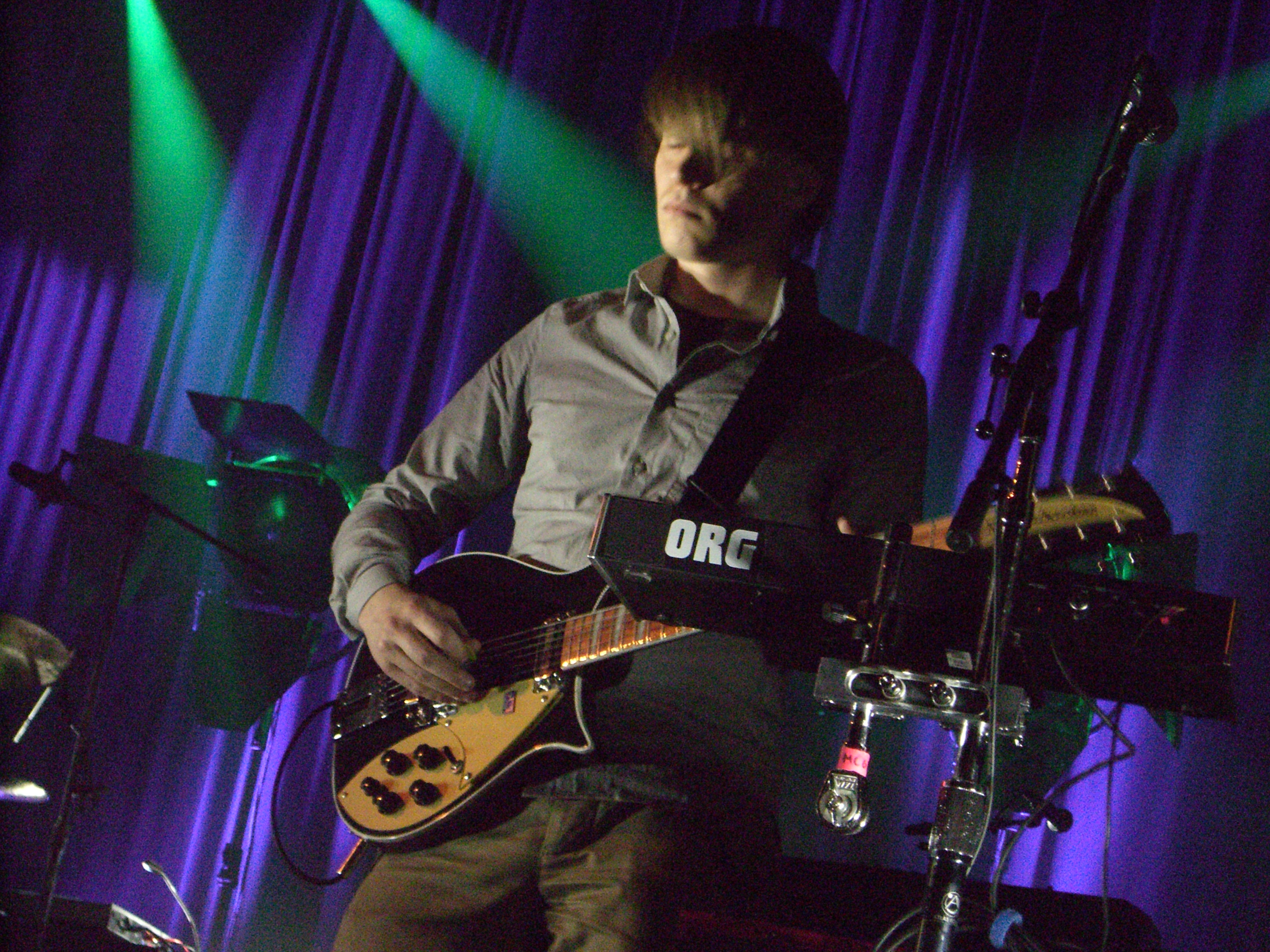
Multi-instrumentalist/producer Chris Walla left the band in 2014.

With these changes, Walla later told the group it would be his last with the band. His departure came as no surprise to the rest of its members, given his general preference for being behind the board versus performing. He had been unhappy with the pace of touring, and Costey's presence had also highlighted creative disagreements, with Walla finding the new songs remote and dull. Walla's last gig with the group came on September 13, 2014, in Victoria, British Columbia, and the band continued on. In the wake of Walla's exit, Death Cab recruited two new members to fill out his space: Dave Depper on guitar and Zac Rae on keyboards. The band had been considering adding a fifth member for years, to help flesh out their live sound. Gibbard had long known Depper through the Pacific Northwest music scene, and Depper introduced him to Rae, with whom he had been in another band. The duo debuted on the press tour for Kintsugi (2015), the band's next album, named after a Japanese art that embraces breakage. They rebooted the band at a central place in their history—the Crocodile Cafe in Seattle, in January 2015.

=== Lineup changes and continued activity (2015–2021) ===
With Depper and Rae on board, Kintsugi represented a new chapter for the band upon its March 2015 bow. It became their third consecutive top 10 album on the Billboard 200, debuting to a modest drop in sales from its predecessor. Singles "The Ghosts of Beverly Drive" and "Black Sun" cemented the band's place in the alternative radio canon, with both singles becoming airplay staples and top 5 hits on the Alternative Airplay ranking. Critics praised its reflective songwriting but felt it lacked some of the boldness and cohesion of their earlier work. The press interpreted much of the album in the context of Gibbard's divorce. Touring behind Kintsugi, Death Cab played North American, Europe, and festival dates, like Bonnaroo, alongside bands like Chvrches and Best Coast. Kintsugi was nominated for the Grammy Award for Best Rock Album, their last nod to date. The band released a standalone single, "Million Dollar Loan", a protest song against President Donald Trump, in October 2016; it was the first time Depper and Rae had contributed in a creative capacity.

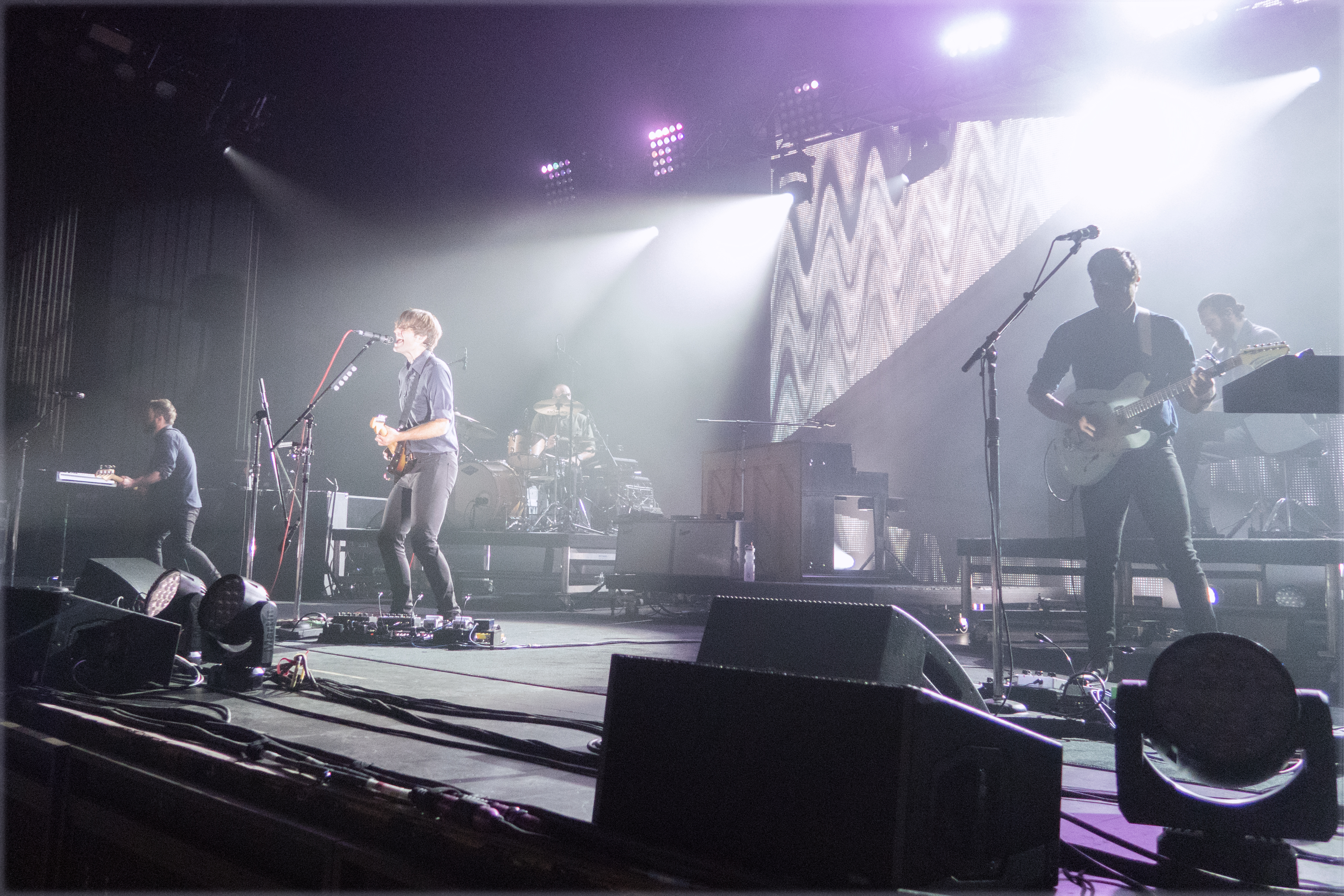
Death Cab for Cutie performing in 2015

In the late 2010s, the band reconvened to begin developing their next album: the transitory Thank You for Today (2018). They connected with Costey for a second time, eager for a creative bridge from the old to the new. Making the record required the band to recalibrate their dynamic after adding two new members, learning to navigate new studio communication, boundaries, and creative input. Gibbard provided more complete demos, unsure of how the process might be with their new members, and wrote lyrics reflecting on the post-tech boom's impacts on Seattle. Thank You for Today landed in the top 20 overall, but did not reach the heights of their previous peak-era releases. "Gold Rush" and "Northern Lights" both topped the Adult Alternative Airplay chart, and critics found the album, which emphasizes mid-tempo ballads, safe and predictable. The band began touring behind the album in June 2018, primarily across North America (supported by Charly Bliss), with later legs in Europe, Australia, and New Zealand. In 2019, the band toured across North America again between June and August with Mitski, Car Seat Headrest, and Jenny Lewis.

During this time, the band issued The Blue EP, a stopgap collection of newly created songs and holdovers from their last album. Though the band planned for another year on the road, in early 2020 the global COVID-19 pandemic took hold, rendering live shows obsolete; Gibbard reacted with a series of at-home livestreams that were well-received. The band also announced a Bandcamp exclusive EP titled The Georgia E.P., which raised $100,000 for Fair Fight Action. The next year, the band also issued Live at the Showbox, another Bandcamp exclusive befitting the National Independent Venue Association (NIVA). The fivesome returned to in-person live performances after 18 months in September 2021, playing shows with Perfume Genius and Deep Sea Diver. The same year, they shared a commemorative 20-year anniversary reissue of The Photo Album which featured studio outtakes, demos and rare recordings. In February 2022, the band shared a cover of Yoko Ono's "Waiting for the Sunrise", which was recorded as part of Gibbard's curated tribute album to Ono entitled Ocean Child: Songs of Yoko Ono.

=== Recent events (2022–present) ===
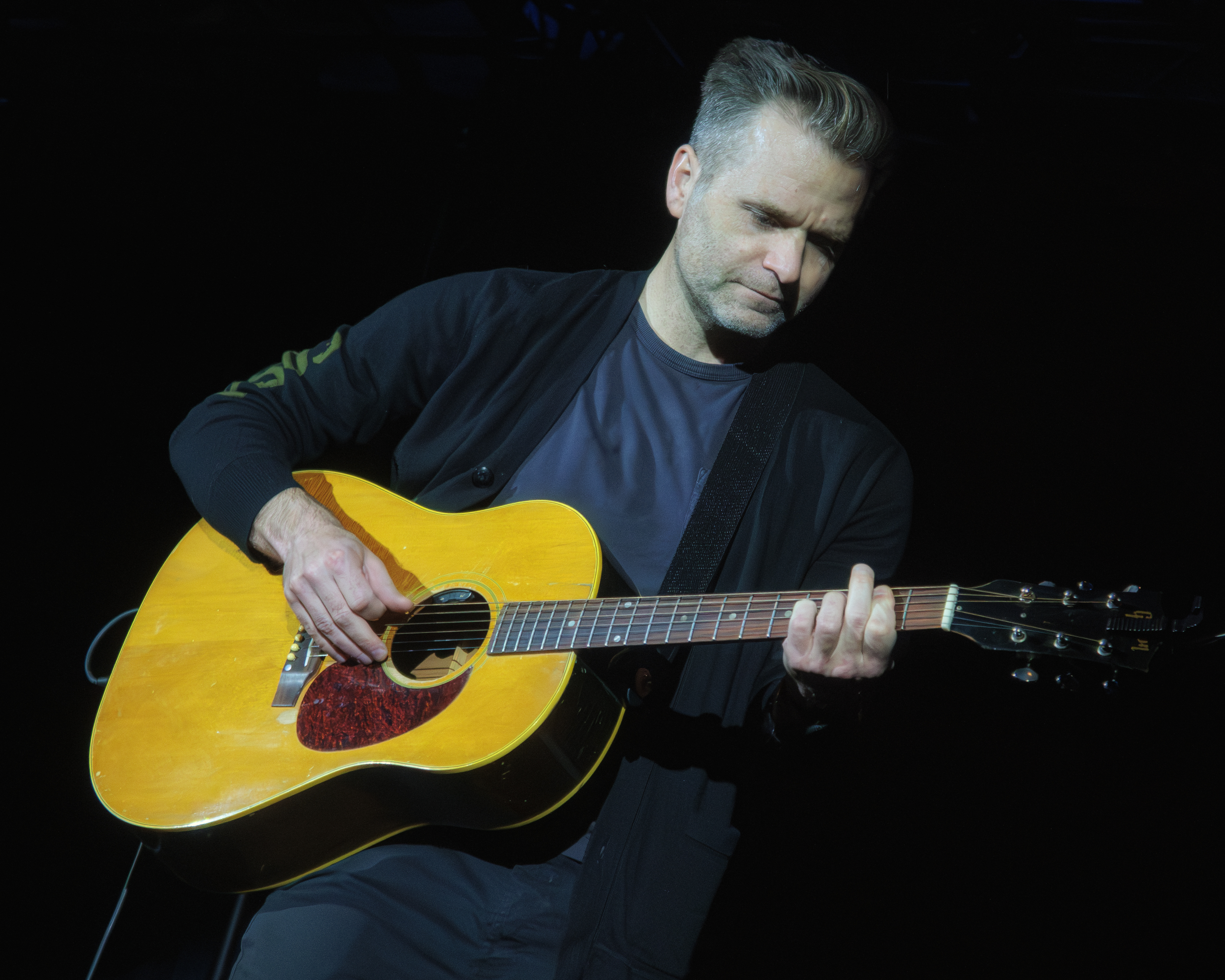
Ben Gibbard pulled double-duty performing with both DCFC and the Postal Service between 2023 and 2024.

The band announced their tenth studio album, Asphalt Meadows, which saw release in September 2022. Much of the record was written remotely during the pandemic through a "chain-letter" process in which band members sequentially built on shared files, generating nearly ninety song ideas that were later narrowed to eleven. The band recorded the album with John Congleton. Critics found the album refreshing and a return to form for the band. "Here to Forever" topped the Alternative Airplay and Adult Alternative Airplay charts, while "Pepper" also topped the latter in 2023. In support, the band launched a North American tour with Low and Yo La Tengo.

Between 2023 and 2024, the band embarked on an extensive arena tour with Gibbard's other project, The Postal Service, performing both Transatlanticism and Give Up in full to celebrate the albums' 20th anniversaries. The extensive jaunt—which spanned two years, 56 dates, and brought the band back to arenas and amphitheaters—was considered one of the most anticipated tours of the season. Much as the anniversary tour a decade prior, this double-billing proved to be a cultural event for the bands' millennial fanbases. At the tour's close in August 2024, Gibbard noted that the band would take their time in writing and recording an eleventh studio album. Speaking to NME, Gibbard noted: "The band has been writing intermittently, over the last couple of years. I can't give you a release date for a new record, but I think we're going to take time off from touring and being in the limelight."

In January 2026, the band signed with Anti-, marking an end to their 22-year period signed to a major label. Ben Gibbard said the band was "thrilled" to join Anti-, citing its roster of favorite artists and longtime friends. In announcing the move, they also announced a forthcoming North American tour featuring Japanese Breakfast, Jay Som, and Nation of Language at select dates. On March 16, the band released the single "Riptides" and announced that their eleventh studio album, I Built You a Tower, would be released on June 5, accompanied by a North American, European and Australian tour later that year.

== Musical style ==
Death Cab for Cutie's music has been labeled indie rock, indie pop, emo, and alternative rock. (Note: Style: Indie Rock: Indie Pop: Emo: Alternative Rock:) Andrew Sacher of BrooklynVegan wrote, "These days, it's common for a band to exist within both the emo scene and the indie rock scene, but in the 2000s, there weren't many who managed to do it. Death Cab were one of the few. [...] If you ever need to remind yourself why emo can claim Death Cab For Cutie, just revisit those first few albums." Alternative Press argued against the emo classification for the band, stating the opinion that Ben Gibbard's vocals are "missing a key component: emotion." The publication suggested that the band was erroneously labeled as emo due to their similarities to Sunny Day Real Estate. The band's early material also contains elements of grunge.

Generally, the band's sound is characterized by "sensitive songwriting [and] memorable melodies." Ben Gibbard's vocals are described as "rich [and] wistful." The band's early work on You Can Play These Songs with Chords was described by Rolling Stone as "emotion through its lack of emotion". Pitchfork also remarked that the work on the cassette was "ultra-lo-fi". On Something About Airplanes the band's style remained similar, with some new instrumental work introduced; "flute, synth, or cello" were noted by AllMusic's Nitsuh Abebe. On We Have the Facts and We're Voting Yes the band again expanded their use of unorthodox instruments, including organ and glockenspiel. Pitchfork called them a "gentle niche" in the current rock climate, compared with bands such as Modest Mouse and Built to Spill.

Rolling Stone reviewed Transatlanticism and commented that it contained "melodic, melancholy songs about feeling both smart and confused, hopelessly romantic but wary of love." Gibbard's voice was described as "plaintive boy-next-door" Entertainment Weekly commented on the music on Plans, saying "The lush arrangements are long on hothouse organs and pianos, but short on the squirmy guitars and squirrelly beats that, on Gibbard's best work, offset his sweet voice and borderline-maudlin poetics with a sense of emotional danger." The band's music on Plans was described by the Dallas Morning News as "a literate, whispery style, the kind of stuff that normally sounds better in headphones than in large venues".

In an interview with Shave Magazine, Ben Gibbard commented on his song writing saying that he "never sit[s] down to write an album number one. I just kind of sit down and write songs and the theme kind of makes itself apparent. But I would never say I was writing about searching for something as much as just trying to document with every song where I am in that moment when I'm writing that song. If a theme kind of makes itself apparent in a record, it has more to do with the fact that just what's been on my mind recently. So I guess clearly I have been and was and am, but it was never a conscious decision."

== Band members ==
Current members

- Ben Gibbard – lead vocals, guitar, keyboards, piano (1997–present), bass, drums, percussion (1997)
- Nick Harmer – bass (1997–present), backing vocals (2008–present), keyboards (2001–03, 2026–present), guitar (2011–12)
- Jason McGerr – drums, percussion (2003–present)
- Dave Depper – guitar, keyboards, backing vocals (2016–present; touring musician 2015–16)
- Zac Rae – keyboards, piano, guitar, backing vocals (2016–present; touring musician 2015–16)

Former members

- Chris Walla – guitar, piano, keyboards, backing vocals (1997–2014)
- Nathan Good – drums, percussion (1997–99)
- Jayson Tolzdorf-Larson – drums, percussion (2000)
- Michael Schorr – drums, percussion (2000–03)

Timeline

== Discography ==
- Something About Airplanes (1998)
- We Have the Facts and We're Voting Yes (2000)
- The Photo Album (2001)
- Transatlanticism (2003)
- Plans (2005)
- Narrow Stairs (2008)
- Codes and Keys (2011)
- Kintsugi (2015)
- Thank You for Today (2018)
- Asphalt Meadows (2022)
- I Built You a Tower (2026)

== Awards and nominations ==
Grammy Award

| Year | Nominee / work | Award | Result |
|---|---|---|---|
| 2006 | Plans | Best Alternative Music Album | Nominated |
| 2007 | Directions | Best Long Form Music Video | Nominated |
| 2007 | "I Will Follow You into the Dark" | Best Pop Performance by a Duo or Group with Vocals | Nominated |
| 2009 | "I Will Possess Your Heart" | Best Rock Song | Nominated |
| 2009 | Narrow Stairs | Best Alternative Music Album | Nominated |
| 2010 | The Open Door EP | Best Alternative Music Album | Nominated |
| 2012 | Codes and Keys | Best Alternative Music Album | Nominated |
| 2016 | Kintsugi | Best Rock Album | Nominated |

MTV Video Music Award

| Year | Nominee / work | Award | Result |
|---|---|---|---|
| 2008 | "I Will Possess Your Heart" | Best Editing (Editor: Aaron Stewart-Ahn and Jeff Buchanan) | Won |
| 2008 | "I Will Possess Your Heart" | Best Cinematography (Director of Photography: Aaron Stewart-Ahn and Shawn Kim) | Nominated |
| 2009 | "Grapevine Fires" | Breakthrough Video | Nominated |
| 2011 | "You Are a Tourist" | Best Art Direction (Art Director: Nick Gould, Tim Nackashi and Anthony Maitz) | Nominated |
