= Grapevine Fires =

2009 single by Death Cab for Cutie

Single by Death Cab for Cutie

from the album Narrow Stairs
- Released: February 3, 2009
- Recorded: 2007
- Genre: Indie rock
- Length: 4:07; 3:37 (Radio Version)
- Label: Atlantic Records, Barsuk Records
- Songwriters: Ben Gibbard, Nick Harmer, Jason McGerr
- Producer: Chris Walla

Death Cab for Cutie singles chronology
"No Sunlight" (2008)	"Grapevine Fires" (2009)	"Little Bribes" (2009)

"Grapevine Fires" is a song by American indie rock band Death Cab for Cutie, the fourth single from their sixth studio album, Narrow Stairs, released February 3, 2009, on Atlantic Records.

The single peaked at number twenty-one on the Billboard Hot Modern Rock Tracks chart, and becoming the band's sixth single on that chart. "Grapevine Fires" was featured in the NBC drama Heroes in the episode "Ink", and it also appeared on the 2009 compilation album, Change Is Now: Renewing America's Promise.

The drumbeat of the song is modeled after the "Purdie Shuffle", although drummer Jason McGerr says it is more of an emulation, as opposed to a replication, of the famous drum pattern.

== Music video ==
The band members' cameo in the video.

The video of the song is animated and created by Walter Robot. It features a semi-literal interpretation of the lyrics by showing a wildfire and its effect on the lives of the people in the video. The band members make a cameo appearance loading a van. The visual interpretation of the song in the video leaves out the imagery of the second verse of the song.

The video was accepted into the Los Angeles Film Festival where it won the Audience Choice Award for Best Music Video.

== Charts ==
Chart (2009)	Peak position
US Alternative Airplay (Billboard)	21
