= Zac Rae =

American musician

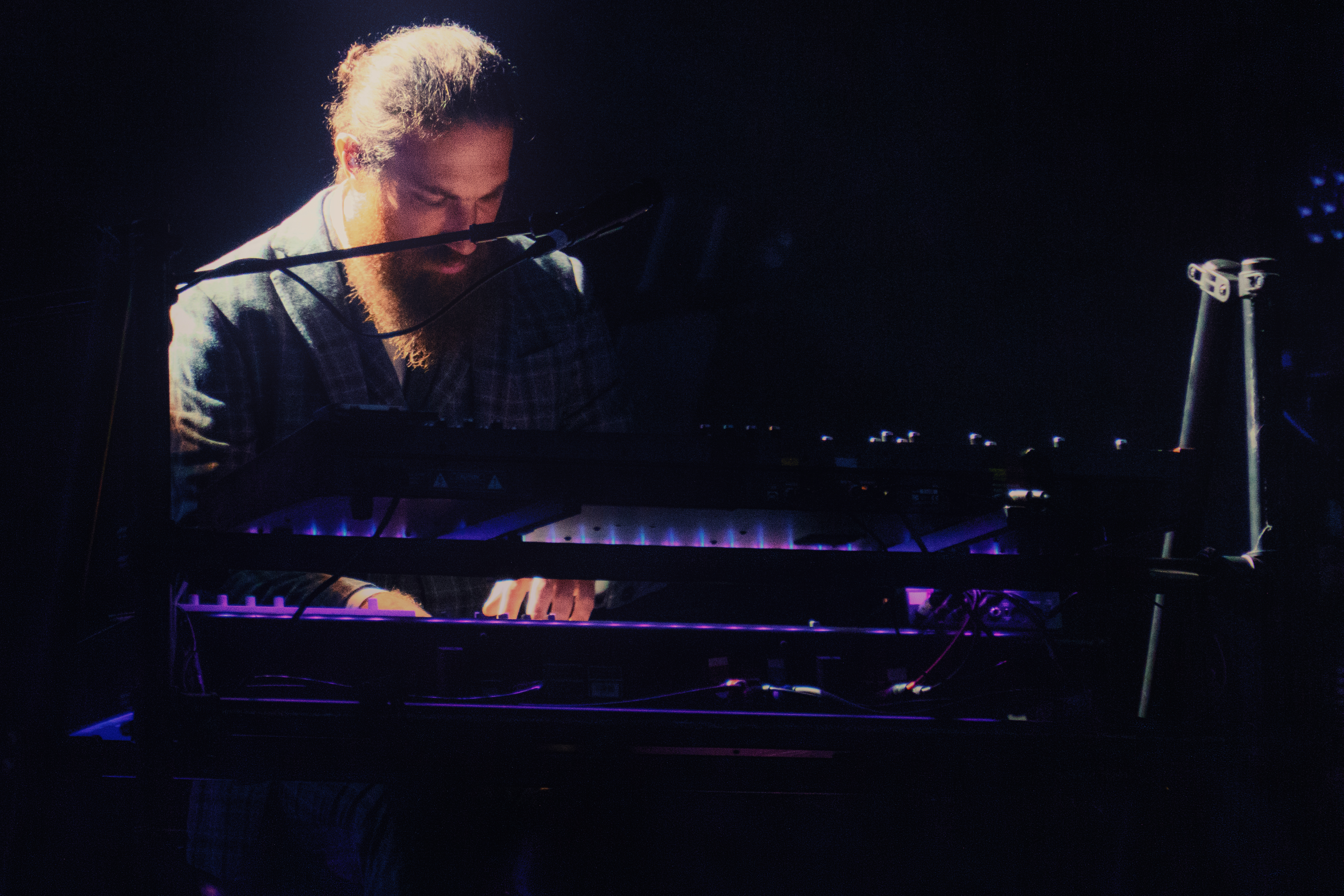
- Rae with Death Cab for Cutie in 2019

Background information
- Genres: Indie rock; indie pop; pop
- Occupations: Musician; songwriter
- Instruments: Piano; keyboards; guitar
- Years active: 2001–present
- Label: Atlantic Records

Zac Rae is an American musician, best known as the keyboardist, pianist, and multi-instrumentalist of the indie rock band Death Cab for Cutie, with whom he has recorded three studio albums and two EPs.

Rae is a former member of Alanis Morissette's backing band, which he joined in 2001 at the age of 21. While touring and recording with Morissette, Rae worked extensively as a session musician, recording with Macy Gray, Stevie Nicks, Ringo Starr, Ziggy Marley, Jane's Addiction, Miley Cyrus and Against Me! amongst others.

In 2015, Rae initially joined Death Cab for Cutie in a touring capacity, following the departure of founding member Chris Walla. In 2016, both he and touring guitarist Dave Depper were added to the band's core line-up. Rae's first studio album with the band, Thank You for Today was released in 2018.

Alongside his duties in Death Cab for Cutie, Rae has contributed to Leonard Cohen's final two studio albums, You Want It Darker (2016) and Thanks for the Dance (2019), and appearing on albums by Lana Del Rey, Dua Lipa, Sabrina Carpenter, The Black Keys, Childish Gambino, Niall Horan, and Best Coast.

== Early life ==
Rae began taking piano lessons at the age of five. During high school, he would seek out live musical opportunities: "When I was in high school, you could get a gig playing jazz for a couple hours at places like Barnes and Noble. So my friends and I would play in little quartets, and each get paid in $25 gift cards, which translated to about two CDs. Later as a teenager, I spent some time on the Cuban jazz circuit in Los Angeles, which was a lot of fun."

Rae studied at USC Thornton School of Music in Southern California for two years, before dropping out to find full-time work as a musician: "Shockingly, no one has ever passed me over for a gig because I didn't have a degree."

== Career ==
Rae's professional career began in 1999: "Around the time I dropped out of music school in 1999, I met a group of more active musicians in LA and I started connecting and working with them in a band called Every Single Saturday. [...] One thing led to another and soon I was working full time doing session work, and then I got my first touring break with Alanis Morissette in 2001 when I was 21".

== Discography ==
with Death Cab for Cutie

- Thank You for Today (2018)
- The Blue EP (2019)
- The Georgia EP (2020)
- Asphalt Meadows (2022)
- I Built You a Tower (2026)

with Alanis Morissette

- Feast on Scraps (2002)
- So-Called Chaos (2004)
- Jagged Little Pill Acoustic (2005)
- Havoc and Bright Lights (2012)

as a session musician

Year	Title	Artist
2026	Instrucciones	Arde Bogotá
2025	No Rain, No Flowers	The Black Keys
2024	Venus	Zara Larsson
2020	A Celebration of Endings	Biffy Clyro
2020	Always Tomorrow	Best Coast
2020	The Family Songbook	The Haden Triplets
2020	Through a Dark Wood	Sea Wolf
2019	Thanks for the Dance	Leonard Cohen
2019	Norman Fucking Rockwell!	Lana Del Rey
2019	California Son	Morrissey
2019	Heroin and Helicopters	Citizen Cope
2019	Love Remains	Tal Wilkenfeld
2018	The Pains of Growing	Alessia Cara
2018	Bay Dream	Culture Abuse
2018	Castles	Lissie
2018	Safe Harbor for Wayward Echoes	Tobias the Owl
2017	Flicker	Niall Horan
2017	Lust for Life	Lana Del Rey
2017	We're All Alright!	Cheap Trick
2017	Dua Lipa	Dua Lipa
2017	Safe Haven	Ruth B
2017	No Date	Daye Jack
2016	"Awaken, My Love!"	Childish Gambino
2016	You Want It Darker	Leonard Cohen
2016	Ziggy Marley	Ziggy Marley
2016	Bang, Zoom, Crazy... Hello	Cheap Trick
2015	Global Underground 041: Naples	James Lavelle
2015	What's Inside: Songs from Waitress	Sara Bareilles
2015	Cheers to the Fall	Andra Day
2015	Eyes Wide Open	Sabrina Carpenter
2015	All American Boy	Steve Grand
2015	I'll Be Me	Glen Campbell
2015	Sisters of Perpetual Heartache	Sisters of Perpetual Heartache
2012	Paradise	Lana Del Rey
