= I Will Possess Your Heart =

Single by Death Cab for Cutie

from the album Narrow Stairs
- Released: March 17, 2008
- Recorded: 2007
- Studio: Two Sticks Audio
- Genre: Alternative rock; indie rock; progressive rock; post-rock
- Length: 8:25 (album version); 4:08 (7" edit); 4:54 (10" edit)
- Label: Atlantic; Barsuk Records
- Songwriters: Ben Gibbard; Chris Walla; Nick Harmer; Jason McGerr
- Producer: Chris Walla

Death Cab for Cutie singles chronology
"I Will Follow You into the Dark" (2006)	"I Will Possess Your Heart" (2008)	"Cath..." (2008)

"I Will Possess Your Heart" is an alternative rock song recorded by the American band Death Cab for Cutie. The song depicts a one-sided obsessive relationship, which led Paste to name it one of the 25 creepiest songs about love. It is notable for its five-minute instrumental introduction influenced by krautrock, as well as its music video which required location shooting across four continents. The song was the lead single from their sixth studio album, Narrow Stairs (2008).

The music is dominated by a repetitive bass guitar riff interspersed with piano chords and Ben Gibbard's vocals. It was released in 2008 in two versions: a full eight-minute album version, and a four-minute radio edit that omitted most of the instrumental introduction. The song was critically acclaimed and nominated for the 2009 Grammy Award for Best Rock Song.

The music video, released on April 11, 2008, features scenes of a young woman traveling alone to various places around the world, interspersed with the band performing in an industrial freezer room. The shoot involved the actress, director, and a crew of two traveling 27,977 miles in 13 days, and was shot on consumer-grade camcorders to achieve a sense of total realism and so that the film crew would blend in as tourists. The video won the 2008 MTV Video Music Award for Best Editing and was nominated for the Best Cinematography award.

== Writing and composition ==
The song's lyrics depict a one-sided obsessive relationship from the point of view of the pursuer, who implores the object of his affection that she needs to "spend some time" with him so that he might "possess [her] heart." Songwriter and lead vocalist Ben Gibbard noted that, although fictional, the song was inspired by the experiences of some of his friends. He added:

The song is basically about a stalker. It’s about this nice guy who wants this girl he can’t have, and he believes they’ll be together once she realizes how great he is—he just has to wait it out. That’s the part that makes the song really creepy, the delusion of thinking that they were meant to be together. It’s a really dark song. A lot of the material is about the inevitable disappointment people feel as they move through life, and things don’t feel the way they expect. No experience will ever match up to the idealized version in your mind.

The song is written in the key of D, but the main motif continually switches modes from major to minor as the chord goes from D to F with a moderate tempo of 134 beats per minute. The music is dominated by a distinctive 4-bar bass guitar riff that is repeated through nearly all of the song. This is interspersed with piano chords that generally follow a D–D/C–F–G progression. The lead vocals have a range of D3–G4. The instrumentation also includes multiple guitar parts, drums, and backup vocals. Gibbard characterized the song as "five minutes of build and then a three-minute song", referring to the lengthy instrumental introduction that takes up more than half the song, influenced by the krautrock band Can. Like the other songs on Narrow Stairs, it was recorded with all band members playing together in the studio, directly to tape without any overdubs.

Gibbard credited Nick Harmer's bass line with being integral to the song, noting inspiration from bassists Eric Avery and Simon Gallup. Harmer said of the bass line, "I immediately gravitated to the creepy, stalker-ish theme that Ben created with the lyrics and the piano chords.... I liked the idea that once a stalker gets obsessed with an idea, it just keeps repeating in his head, so I wanted the bass line to have a repetitive, incessant theme."

The song was released on March 18, 2008, initially as a "surprise stream" on the band's website, and soon after was picked up by radio stations. It was released in two versions: the album version of the song is over eight minutes long, while the radio edit largely removes the instrumental introduction, shortening the song to four minutes.

== Reception ==
The song received acclaim from critics. James Montgomery of MTV News said of the song, "there are moments on Stairs that stop you dead in your tracks, send shivers up your spine and make you go 'Whoa'... like the first four-and-a-half minutes of 'I Will Possess Your Heart,' a propulsive whirl of stalking bass line, spindly guitars and stabbing piano." Will Hermes noted in Rolling Stone that the sense of menace in the song was "playing against type for a guy with one of rock's purest voices—a vibrato-less, bell-clear high tenor whose choirboy quality only throws the darkness here into relief." Blender's Jonah Weiner concurred, stating "it's a pleasant surprise to hear Gibbard inhabit such a self-consciously creepy role, rather than play the occasionally errant, essentially good-hearted boyfriend who soft-shoes through so many of his tales." In 2011, Tyler Kane of Paste included the song in a list of "the 25 creepiest songs about love".

"I Will Possess Your Heart" was named the iTunes UK song of the year 2008 and was ranked #36 on the Triple J Hottest 100 of 2008 in Australia. The song was nominated for the 2009 Grammy Award for Best Rock Song, but lost to "Girls in Their Summer Clothes" by Bruce Springsteen.

"I Will Possess Your Heart" was covered by Springfield, Massachusetts-based sludge metal band Chained to the Bottom of the Ocean, on their LP The Vestige, which was released in 2020.

== Music video ==
Locations used in the music video of "I Will Possess Your Heart"

The music video follows a young woman, portrayed by Lindsay Burdge, as she travels to various world locations while barely reacting to the sights around her.

=== Synopsis ===
The music video features scenes of a young woman traveling alone to various places around the world, interspersed with the band performing in an industrial freezer room. Throughout her journey, the woman keeps a neutral expression and barely reacts to the sights around her. The video was shot in New York City, London, Paris, Frankfurt, Tokyo, Hokkaido, Tunis, Carthage, Bangkok, Siem Reap, and Phnom Penh.

=== Filming ===
Aaron Stewart-Ahn was selected to direct the video based on his previous work directing the video for "Stable Song", as well as work documenting the band's live performances. Stewart-Ahn said that the theme of travel had been inspired by Death Cab for Cutie's earlier song "Transatlanticism", as well as his own extensive experience traveling solo, adding that "I’ve always felt that travel is a defining human experience that changes you forever, and hope that this depiction of wanderlust, obsessiveness, repetition, and loneliness conveys some of that.” He also said "The idea is that the band is performing in an incredibly cold environment while this woman is traveling around the world, moving toward progressively warmer climes. The farther she gets from the song's obsessive protagonist, the more her world opens up, and the less reliable his memories of her become."

The shoot involved the actress, director, and a crew of two traveling 27,977 miles in 13 days. The young woman was portrayed by Lindsay Burdge, who would years later become known for lead roles in several independent films such as A Teacher and The Sideways Light. On his directing, Stewart-Ahn said "The goal was absolute realism; nothing was staged." Much of the film was shot on camcorder, including a Panasonic AG-HVX200 and a consumer-grade Canon HV30, so as to blend in by looking like tourists. He noted that the trip to Hokkaido was taken on a whim, and during the trip the team realized that daylight would be gone by the time they would reach their intended destination, so they exited the train at Asari and took what would become the final shot of the video there.

Stewart-Ahn selected Shawn Kim to direct the shots of the band, and although they never met in person, they established visual motifs to unite their respective parts of the video. The scenes of the band were shot in a food storage facility in Los Angeles at temperatures below 12 °F. Unlike Stewart-Ahn's section of the video, Kim used a professional Arriflex 435 camera and Panavision E-Series lenses, which he felt added to the coldness of the image. The two sets used were at different temperatures, and since bringing the large anamorphic lenses from a colder to a warmer temperature would result in condensation, a separate set of lenses needed to be used for each set.

=== Release and reception ===
The music video for "I Will Possess Your Heart" was released on MTV.com and VH1.com on April 11, 2008, and immediately added to those channels' rotations. Two versions of the video were released, a full-length version running 8:31 which features the album version of the song, and a shorter 4:22 version which features the radio edit, omitting most of the instrumental introduction. The video won the 2008 MTV Video Music Award for Best Editing for editors Aaron Stewart-Ahn and Jeff Buchanan. It was also nominated for the Best Cinematography award, but lost to Wyatt Troll for the White Stripes’ "Conquest".

== Track listing ==
US CD:

1. "I Will Possess Your Heart" (7" edit)
2. "I Will Possess Your Heart" (10" edit)
3. "I Will Possess Your Heart" (album version)

US 7" vinyl:

1. "I Will Possess Your Heart" (radio edit)
2. "The Ice Is Getting Thinner" (demo)

== Credits and personnel ==
- Words by Benjamin Gibbard
- Song by Benjamin Gibbard, Nicholas Harmer, Jason McGerr, and Christopher Walla
- Produced by Christopher Walla
- Recorded by Christopher Walla and Will Markwell at Two Sticks Audio, Seattle, Washington
- Mixed by Christopher Walla at The Alberta Court, Portland, Oregon
- Mastered by Roger Seibel at SAE Mastering, Phoenix, Arizona
- Artwork and layout by EE Storey

== Charts ==
=== Weekly charts ===
Weekly chart performance for "I Will Possess Your Heart"
Chart (2008)	Peak position
Canada Hot 100 (Billboard)	60
Canada Rock (Billboard)	24
Scottish Singles Sales (Official Charts)	44
UK Singles (Official Charts)	85
US Billboard Hot 100	70
US Adult Alternative Airplay (Billboard)	1
US Adult Pop Airplay (Billboard)	40
US Alternative Airplay (Billboard)	6
US Pop 100 (Billboard)	61

=== Year-end charts ===
Year-end chart performance for "I Will Possess Your Heart"
Chart (2008)	Position
US Alternative Airplay (Billboard)	19

== Certifications ==
Certifications for "I Will Possess Your Heart"
Region	Certification	Certified units/sales
United States (RIAA)	Platinum	1,000,000^{‡}
^{‡} Sales+streaming figures based on certification alone.
