= Kintsugi (album) =

Studio album by Death Cab for Cutie
- Released: March 31, 2015
- Recorded: 2014
- Genres: Art rock; indie rock; indie pop; post-punk revival
- Length: 45:00
- Labels: Atlantic; Barsuk
- Producer: Rich Costey

Death Cab for Cutie chronology
Codes and Keys (2011)	Kintsugi (2015)	Thank You for Today (2018)

Singles from Kintsugi
- 1. "Black Sun" Released: January 26, 2015; 2. "The Ghosts of Beverly Drive" Released: March 9, 2015; 3. "Good Help (Is So Hard to Find)" Released: April 8, 2016

Kintsugi is the eighth studio album by American indie rock band Death Cab for Cutie, released on March 31, 2015, on Atlantic Records. Recorded at Eldorado Recording Studios, in Burbank, California, Kintsugi is produced by Rich Costey, and is the first Death Cab for Cutie album to feature an outside producer. The album was nominated for Best Rock Album at the 58th Grammy Awards.

During the production of the album, lead guitarist and founding member Chris Walla announced that he was leaving the band, though he continued contributing to the recording and creative process as a full member until the album's completion.

== Production ==
The band first hinted that they were working on a follow-up to 2011's Codes and Keys by posting several photos of their studio and recording equipment to Instagram in October 2013. In October 2014, the band spoke to Stereogum about their then-untitled eighth album, their experience working with an outside producer, and Walla's departure.

The album title is derived from kintsugi, a type of Japanese art involving fixing broken pottery, and as a philosophy of treating breakage and repair as part of the history of an object, rather than something to disguise.

== Composition ==
On the album, frontman Ben Gibbard returned to an evocative, revealing writing style he had avoided on prior albums, and frequently refers to places versus people: "Culver City, Beverly Drive, "the cliffs of the Palisades" — each serves as a clearly defined setting on an album that looks beyond Gibbard's divorce to ponder the larger systems of power and privilege at work in L.A.," observed writer Mikael Wood. "No Room in Frame" addresses in general terms a decaying love, which widely interpreted as inspired by Gibbard's divorce from actress Zooey Deschanel. "The Ghosts of Beverly Drive" was written early on, and focuses on Gibbard's time living in Los Angeles. In the song's chorus, Gibbard finds himself "return[ing] to the scene of these crimes, where the hedgerows slowly wind." "Little Wanderer" expresses hope for a love across distance, ending with an embrace in an airport. Walla was reportedly not a fan of the acoustic "Hold No Guns", and suggested it should be withheld from the album, but was overruled.

Gibbard based the celebrity critique "Good Help (Is So Hard to Find)" on an amalgam of individuals he met living in Hollywood.

== Release ==
The album's title, track listing, and artwork were revealed via social media on January 12, 2015, with the song "Black Sun" to be released as the lead single from the album. The songs "Black Sun", "The Ghosts of Beverly Drive", and "No Room in Frame", received their live debut during a performance at The Crocodile in Seattle on January 20, 2015, two months prior to the album's release. Black Sun was officially released on January 26, 2015, following several weeks of snippets of lyrics being posted on various social media sites and the official website.

== Critical reception ==
Professional ratings
Aggregate scores
Source	Rating
AnyDecentMusic?	6.4/10
Metacritic	67/100
Review scores
Source	Rating
AllMusic	3.5/5 stars
The A.V. Club	B+
Chicago Tribune	3/4 stars
Entertainment Weekly	B−
The Guardian	3/5 stars
Mojo	3/5 stars
Pitchfork	5.5/10
Q	3/5 stars
Rolling Stone	3.5/5 stars
Spin	6/10

Kintsugi has received mostly positive reviews from music critics. At Metacritic, which assigns a rating determined by a "weighted average" of reviews from mainstream critics, the album received a score of 67 out of 100, based on 30 reviews, indicating "generally favorable reviews".

In a three and a half out of five star review, Stephen Thomas Erlewine of AllMusic claims: "Most of Kintsugi shimmers upon a gloss constructed out of new wave remnants and faded memories of yacht rock." Writing for Consequence of Sound and giving the album a "C−" rating, Philip Cosores states: "There are moments of radio-ready bliss, a few songs with lyrics that slowly become affecting, a handful of forgettable diversions, and some expected trite, misguided nonsense." Lanre Bakare of The Guardian gave the album three stars out of five and writes: "Sometimes it's too overwrought and wanders into clichéd territory." Writing for Exclaim!, James Smith felt that "Kintsugi...is a return to form for the band," citing an extra dimension added by blending "lush arrangements...with electronic flourishes" though "the band takes these new elements too far, with underwhelming results."

=== Accolades ===
Year	Association	Category	Result
2016	Grammy Awards	Best Rock Album	Nominated

== Track listing ==
All songs written by Benjamin Gibbard, except where noted.

No.	Title	Writer(s)	Length
1.	"No Room in Frame"	Gibbard, Nicholas Harmer	4:05
2.	"Black Sun"		4:49
3.	"The Ghosts of Beverly Drive"		4:04
4.	"Little Wanderer"		4:19
5.	"You've Haunted Me All My Life"		4:08
6.	"Hold No Guns"		3:03
7.	"Everything's a Ceiling"		3:41
8.	"Good Help (Is So Hard to Find)"		4:47
9.	"El Dorado"		3:38
10.	"Ingénue"	Gibbard, Jason McGerr, Chris Walla	4:31
11.	"Binary Sea"		4:05
Total length:			45:00

== Personnel ==
Credits adapted from AllMusic:

Death Cab for Cutie

- Benjamin Gibbard – guitar, vocals
- Nicholas Harmer – bass guitar
- Jason McGerr – drums, percussion
- Chris Walla – guitar, keyboard, backing vocals

Production

- Christopher Possanza – producer
- Martin Cooke – engineer
- Rich Costey – engineer, mixing, producer
- Nicolas Fournier – engineer
- Mario Borgatta – assistant engineer
- Bob Ludwig – mastering
- Josh Rosenfeld – producer
- Joe Rudko – cover art

== Commercial performance ==
Kintsugi debuted at No. 8 on the US Billboard 200 chart, selling 56,000 copies in its first week. It's the fourth Death Cab for Cutie album to enter the Billboard 200's top 10. In Canada, the album debuted at No. 5 on the Canadian Albums Chart, selling 4,800 copies.

== Charts ==
=== Weekly charts ===
Chart (2015)	Peak position
Australian Albums (ARIA)	21
Canadian Albums (Billboard)	5
Belgian Albums (Ultratop Flanders)	90
Dutch Albums (Album Top 100)	79
German Albums (Offizielle Top 100)	73
Hungarian Albums (MAHASZ)	27
New Zealand Albums (RMNZ)	38
Scottish Albums (Official Charts)	21
Swiss Albums (Schweizer Hitparade)	73
UK Albums (Official Charts)	28
US Billboard 200	8
US Top Alternative Albums (Billboard)	1
US Top Rock Albums (Billboard)	1

=== Year-end charts ===
Chart (2015)	Position
US Top Rock Albums (Billboard)	38

== Release history ==
Source: Amazon.com

Region	Date	Format(s)	Label
United States	March 31, 2015	CD; Digital download; vinyl; Cassette	Atlantic
