= Death Cab for Cutie discography =

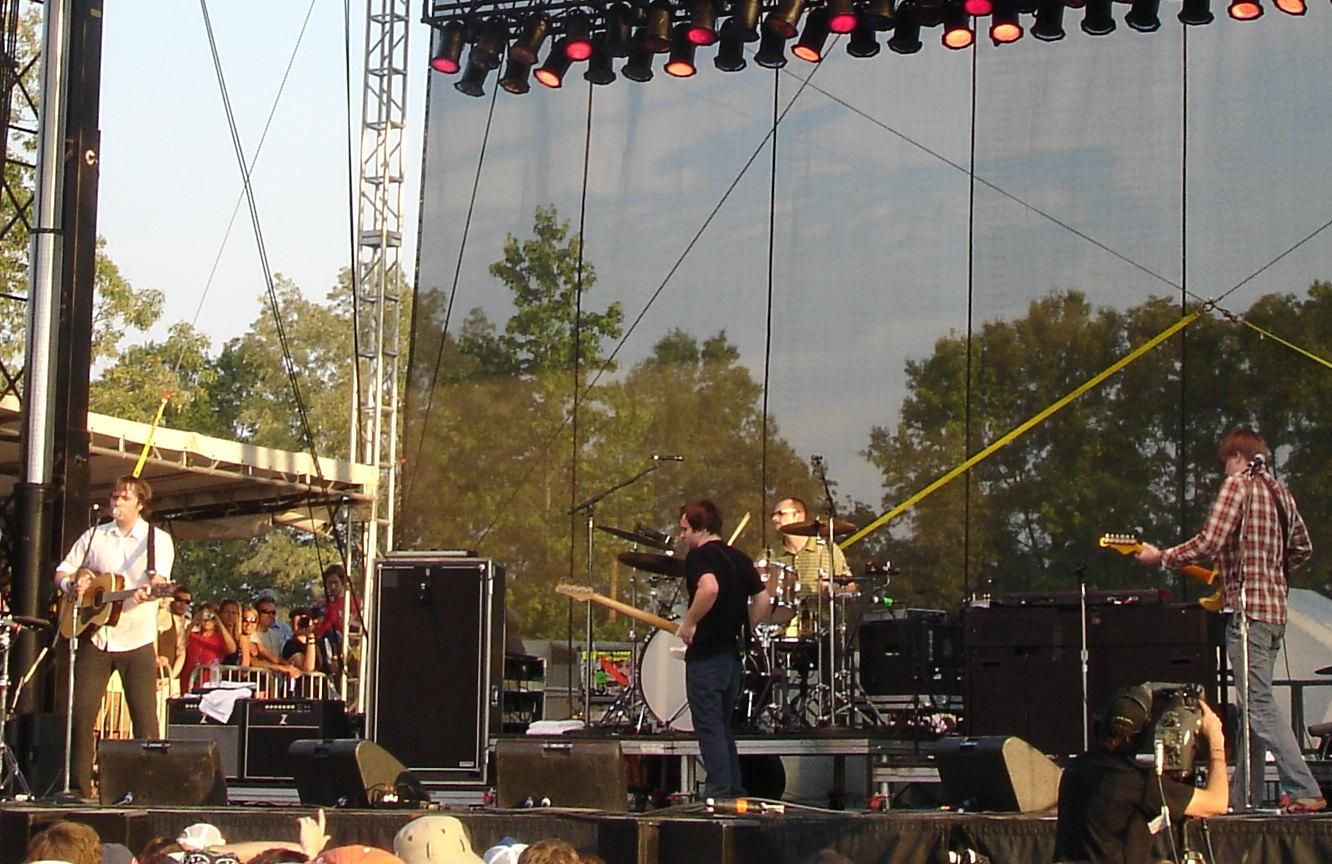
- Death Cab for Cutie performing at Bonnaroo in 2006
- Studio albums: 11
- Extended plays: 5
- Singles: 32
- Video albums: 2
- Music videos: 9
- Other appearances: 10

Death Cab for Cutie has released eleven studio albums, five extended plays (EPs), a demo tape, a digital album, one live album, thirty-two singles (including one as featured artist), nine music videos, and two DVDs. Death Cab for Cutie is an American indie rock group from Bellingham, Washington and was formed in 1997 by Ben Gibbard as a side project from Pinwheel. After releasing a demo tape, he added guitarist Chris Walla, bassist Nick Harmer, and drummer Nathan Good to the band. Death Cab signed to Barsuk Records and released four extended plays (EPs) and four studio albums through the label. The fourth album, Transatlanticism, reached number 97 on the Billboard 200 and was eventually certified gold in the United States. The group also issued nine singles and a demo tape through Barsuk.

In 2004, the band signed with Atlantic Records, a subsidiary of the Warner Music Group. Their first release on the label, Plans, earned a platinum certification and charted at number four in the US. The single "Soul Meets Body" was the band's first to chart on the Billboard Hot 100. Death Cab for Cutie topped the US and Canadian album charts with Narrow Stairs (2008), with help from the Hot 100 single "I Will Possess Your Heart". Both Plans and Narrow Stairs received critical praise and were nominated for the Grammy Award for Best Alternative Music Album. Other projects with Atlantic include a downloadable digital album, two DVDs, and five singles.

In 2013, a limited edition vinyl boxed set called The Barsuk Years was released on the Artist in Residence label. The 7-LP set, which includes all the band's early works, was produced in a limited run of 1500 units, each individually numbered and signed by the band.

This list does not include material that members of Death Cab for Cutie recorded with The Postal Service, ¡All-Time Quarterback! or other side projects.

== Albums ==
=== Studio albums ===
List of studio albums, with selected chart positions, sales figures and certifications
Title	Album details	Peak chart positions										Sales	Certifications
Title	Album details	US	AUS	BEL	CAN	GER	IRL	JPN	NLD	SWI	UK	Sales	Certifications
Something About Airplanes	Released: August 18, 1998; Label: Barsuk; Format: CD, vinyl	—	—	—	—	—	—	—	—	—	—		
We Have the Facts and We're Voting Yes	Released: March 21, 2000; Label: Barsuk; Format: CD, vinyl	—	—	—	—	—	—	—	—	—	—		
The Photo Album	Released: October 9, 2001; Label: Barsuk; Format: CD, vinyl	— (Note: The Photo Album did not enter the US Billboard 200, but peaked at number 40 on the US Heatseekers Albums Chart.)	—	—	—	—	—	—	—	—	—		
Transatlanticism	Released: October 7, 2003; Label: Barsuk; Format: CD, vinyl	97	—	—	—	—	—	—	— (Note: Transatlanticism did not enter the Dutch Album Top 100, but entered the Dutch Alternative Top 30 chart at number 21.)	—	—		RIAA: Platinum; MC: Gold
Plans	Released: August 30, 2005; Label: Atlantic; Format: CD, vinyl	4	48	—	17	86	—	—	—	—	104	US: 1,200,000	RIAA: Platinum; BPI: Silver; MC: Platinum
Narrow Stairs	Released: May 13, 2008; Label: Atlantic; Format: CD, vinyl	1	6	61	1	40	29	58	67	57	24		RIAA: Gold; BPI: Silver; MC: Gold
Codes and Keys	Released: May 31, 2011; Label: Atlantic; Format: CD, vinyl	3	7	59	3	47	23	69	74	59	24	US: 285,000	
Kintsugi	Released: March 31, 2015; Label: Atlantic; Format: CD, vinyl	8	21	90	5	73	26	56	79	73	28		
Thank You for Today	Released: August 17, 2018; Label: Atlantic; Format: CD, vinyl	13	55	44	21	53	57	140	62	44	24		
Asphalt Meadows	Released: September 16, 2022; Label: Atlantic; Format: CD, digital, vinyl	60	— (Note: Asphalt Meadows did not enter the ARIA Top 100 Albums Chart, but peaked at number 13 on the ARIA Digital Album Chart.)	81	—	95	—	179	—	82	89		
I Built You a Tower	Released: June 5, 2026; Label: Anti-; Format: CD	80	55	—	—	65	—	—	—	—	89		
"—" denotes a release that did not chart.

=== Digital albums ===
List of digital albums, with selected chart positions
Title	Album details	Peak chart positions	
Title	Album details	US Sales	UK DL
iTunes Originals – Death Cab for Cutie	Released: October 12, 2005; Label: Atlantic; Format: Digital download	—	—
Asphalt Meadows (Acoustic)	Released: March 10, 2023; Label: Atlantic; Format: Digital download	60	89

=== Live albums ===
List of live albums, with selected chart positions
Title	Album details	Peak chart positions			
Title	Album details	US	US Cla.	UK DL	UK Indie
Live 2012	Released: April 19, 2014; Label: Barsuk (Bark #144); Format: vinyl, digital (Note: Double LP on 180-gram vinyl with digital download key for Record Store Day.); featuring Magik*Magik Orchestra	— (Note: Live 2012 did not enter the US Billboard 200, but peaked at number 11 on the US Vinyl Albums Chart.)	16	—	—
Live at The Showbox	Released: May 7, 2021; Label: self-released; Format: digital	— (Note: Live at The Showbox did not enter the US Billboard 200, but peaked at number 21 on the US Top Album Sales Chart.)	—	19	36

=== Demo albums ===
List of demo albums, with selected chart positions
Title	Album details	Peak chart positions	
Title	Album details	US Heat.	US Ind.
You Can Play These Songs with Chords	Released: 1997; Re-released: October 22, 2002; Label: Elsinor (Els #012) / Barsuk (Bark #28); Format: CS	19	26

== Extended plays ==
List of extended plays, with selected chart positions
Title	Extended play details	Peak chart positions						
Title	Extended play details	US	US Dance	US Rock	US Ind.	AUS	SCO	UK DL
The Forbidden Love EP	Released: October 24, 2000; Label: Barsuk (Bark #15); Format: CD	—	—	—	—	—	—	—
The Stability EP	Released: February 19, 2002; Label: Barsuk (Bark #23); Format: CD	—	—	—	—	—	—	—
The John Byrd EP	Released: March 1, 2005; Label: Barsuk (Bark #43); Format: CD	—	—	—	22	—	—	—
The Open Door EP	Released: March 31, 2009 (digital) April 14, 2009 (retail); Label: Atlantic; Format: CD, vinyl, digital download	30	—	8	—	50	—	39
Keys and Codes Remix EP	Released: 2011; Label: Atlantic; Format: CD	—	24	—	—	—	—	—
The Blue EP	Released: September 6, 2019; Label: Atlantic; Format: CD, vinyl, digital download	— (Note: The Blue EP did not enter the US Billboard 200, but peaked at number 17 on the US Top Album Sales Chart.)	—	35	—	—	74	57
The Georgia E.P.	Released: December 4, 2020; Label: Atlantic; Format: Vinyl, digital download	115	—	16	—	—	—	—
"—" denotes a release that did not chart.

=== Digital extended plays ===
List of digital extended plays, with selected chart positions
Title	Extended play details	Peak chart positions
Title	Extended play details	US
Studio X Sessions EP	Released: July 27, 2004; Label: Barsuk (Bark #39); Format: Digital download	—
iTunes Live: London Festival '08	Released: July 19, 2008; Label: Atlantic; Format: Digital download	—
Live from Las Vegas at The Palms E.P.	Released: August 2008; Label: Atlantic; Format: Digital download	135
"—" denotes a release that did not chart.

== Singles ==
=== As lead artist ===
==== 1990s–2000s ====
List of singles as lead artist, with selected chart positions, showing year released and album name
Title	Year	Peak chart positions										Certifications	Album
Title	Year	US	US Alt.	AUS	CAN	GER	JPN	NZ	SCO	SPA	UK	Certifications	Album
"Your Bruise"	1998	—	—	—	—	—	—	—	—	—	—		Something About Airplanes
"Prove My Hypotheses"	1999	—	—	—	—	—	—	—	—	—	—		You Can Play These Songs with Chords
"Underwater!"	2000	—	—	—	—	—	—	—	—	—	—		non-album single
"Stability"	2002	—	—	—	—	—	—	—	—	—	—		The Stability EP
"A Movie Script Ending"	2002	—	—	—	—	—	—	—	—	—	123		The Photo Album
"I Was a Kaleidoscope"	2002	—	—	—	—	—	—	—	—	—	115		The Photo Album
"We Laugh Indoors"	2002	—	—	—	—	—	—	—	—	—	122		The Photo Album
"The New Year"	2003	—	—	—	—	—	—	—	—	—	86		Transatlanticism
"The Sound of Settling"	2004	—	—	—	—	—	—	—	—	—	84		Transatlanticism
"Title and Registration"	2004	—	—	—	—	—	—	—	—	—	—		Transatlanticism
"Soul Meets Body"	2005	60	5	—	—	—	—	—	82	—	125	RIAA: Platinum; MC: Gold	Plans
"Crooked Teeth"	2006	—	10	100	—	—	—	—	43	—	69	RIAA: Gold	Plans
"I Will Follow You into the Dark"	2006	—	— (Note: "I Will Follow You into the Dark" did not enter the Alternative Airplay chart, but peaked at number 39 on the Alternative Digital Songs chart.)	—	—	—	—	—	42	—	66	RIAA: 2× Platinum; BPI: Silver; MC: Platinum; RMNZ: Gold	Plans
"I Will Possess Your Heart"	2008	70	6	—	60	—	—	—	44	—	85	RIAA: Platinum	Narrow Stairs
"Cath..."	2008	—	10	—	—	—	—	—	—	—	— (Note: "Cath…" did not enter the UK Singles Chart, but peaked at number 64 on the UK Physical Singles Chart Top 100.)		Narrow Stairs
"No Sunlight"	2009	—	— (Note: "No Sunlight" did not enter the Alternative Airplay chart, but peaked at number 8 on the Adult Alternative Airplay chart.)	—	—	—	—	—	—	—	—		Narrow Stairs
"Grapevine Fires"	2009	—	21	—	—	—	—	—	—	—	—		Narrow Stairs
"Little Bribes"	2009	—	— (Note: "Little Bribes" did not enter the Alternative Airplay chart, but peaked at number 6 on the Adult Alternative Airplay chart.)	—	—	—	—	—	—	—	—		The Open Door EP
"Meet Me on the Equinox"	2009	— (Note: "Meet Me on the Equinox" did not enter the Billboard Hot 100 but peaked at number 2 on the Bubbling Under Hot 100 Singles chart, which acts as an extension to the Hot 100.)	8	30	—	71	73	34	85	15	86		The Twilight Saga: New Moon soundtrack
"—" denotes a release that did not chart.

==== 2010s–2020s ====
List of singles as lead artist, with selected chart positions, showing year released and album name
Title	Year	Peak chart positions										Certifications	Album
Title	Year	US Bub.	US AAA	US Alt.	US Rock	BEL Tip	CAN Rock	CZR Rock	JPN	MEX Ing.	UK Phys.	Certifications	Album
"You Are a Tourist"	2011	1	1	1	3	19	18	—	60	32	—	RIAA: Gold	Codes and Keys
"In Living Stereo!" (Note: "In Living Stereo!" was released as a limited-edition 7-inch vinyl sampler for Record Store Day 2011.)	2011	— (Note: "In Living Stereo!" did not enter the Billboard Hot 100 but peaked at number nine on the Hot Singles Sales chart.)	—	—	—	—	—	—	—	—	44		non-album single
"Home Is a Fire"	2011	—	—	—	—	—	—	—	—	—	—		Codes and Keys
"Stay Young, Go Dancing"	2011	—	11	31	40	76	—	—	—	—	—		Codes and Keys
"Underneath the Sycamore"	2012	—	—	— (Note: "Underneath the Sycamore" did not enter the Alternative Airplay chart, but peaked at number 24 on the Alternative Digital Songs chart.)	— (Note: "Underneath the Sycamore" did not enter the Rock Songs chart, but peaked at number 45 on the Rock Digital Songs chart.)	—	—	—	—	—	—		Codes and Keys
"Black Sun"	2015	14	1	2	12	—	19	—	—	—	—		Kintsugi
"The Ghosts of Beverly Drive"	2015	—	15	3	21	—	31	—	—	—	—		Kintsugi
"Bad Reputation"	2015	—	—	—	—	—	—	—	—	—	96		non-album single
"Good Help (Is So Hard to Find)"	2016	—	—	27	—	—	45	—	—	50	—		Kintsugi
"Tractor Rape Chain"	2016	—	—	—	—	—	—	—	—	—	80		non-album single
"Million Dollar Loan"	2016	—	—	—	—	— (Note: "Million Dollar Loan" did not enter the Ultratop Top 50, but spent 4 weeks as an extra tip on the Ultratop Bubbling Under chart.)	—	—	—	—	—		30 Days, 30 Songs
"Gold Rush"	2018	—	1	6	14	48	8	14	—	—	—		Thank You for Today
"I Dreamt We Spoke Again"	2018	—	—	—	42	—	—	—	—	—	—		Thank You for Today
"Northern Lights"	2018	—	1	12	27	—	19	—	—	—	—		Thank You for Today
"When We Drive"	2019	—	28	—	—	—	—	—	—	—	—		Thank You for Today
"Kids in '99"	2019	—	—	—	—	—	—	—	—	—	—		The Blue EP
"Waiting for the Sunrise"	2022	—	—	—	—	—	—	—	—	—	—		Ocean Child: Songs of Yoko Ono
"Roman Candles"	2022	—	—	—	—	—	—	—	—	—	—		Asphalt Meadows
"Here to Forever"	2022	—	1	1	44	—	8	15	—	—	—		Asphalt Meadows
"Foxglove Through the Clearcut"	2022	—	—	—	—	—	—	—	—	—	—		Asphalt Meadows
"Pepper"	2022	—	1	5	— (Note: "Pepper" did not enter the Hot Rock & Alternative Songs chart, but peaked at number 10 on the Rock & Alternative Airplay chart.)	—	23	—	—	—	—		Asphalt Meadows
"An Arrow in the Wall"	2023	—	32	—	—	—	—	—	—	—	—		non-album single
"Riptides"	2026	—	1	2	— (Note: "Riptides" did not enter the Hot Rock & Alternative Songs chart, but peaked at number four on the Rock & Alternative Airplay chart.)	—	8	—	—	—	—		I Built You a Tower
"Punching the Flowers"	2026	—	—	—	—	—	—	—	—	—	—		I Built You a Tower
"Stone Over Water"	2026	—	1	25	— (Note: "Stone Over Water" did not enter the Hot Rock & Alternative Songs chart, but peaked at number 21 on the Rock & Alternative Airplay chart.)	—	—	—	—	—	—		I Built You a Tower
"—" denotes a release that did not chart.

=== As featured artist ===
List of singles as featured artist, with selected chart positions
Title	Year	Peak chart positions				Album
Title	Year	US	US R&B /HH	BEL	NZ Hot	Album
"Do You Remember" (Chance the Rapper featuring Death Cab for Cutie)	2019	95	42	— (Note: "Do You Remember" did not enter the Ultratop Top 50, but spent 4 weeks as an extra tip on the Ultratop Bubbling Under chart.)	18	The Big Day
"—" denotes a release that did not chart.

== Other charting songs ==
List of other charting songs, with selected chart positions
Title	Year	Peak chart positions	Album
Title	Year	ICE	Album
"Waterfalls"	2022	2	The Georgia E.P.

== Video albums ==
Year	Album details	Peak
Year	Album details	US
2005	Drive Well, Sleep Carefully: Released: July 26, 2005; Label: Plexifilm; Format: DVD	20
2006	Directions: The Plans Video Album: Released: April 11, 2006; Label: Atlantic Records; Format: DVD	11
2011	Death Cab for Cutie: Live at the Mt. Baker Theatre: Released: May 31, 2011; Label: Atlantic Records; Format: DVD	3

== Music videos ==
Year	Title	Director
2001	"A Movie Script Ending"	Josh Melnick and Xander Charity
2003	"The New Year"	Jay Martin
2004	"The Sound of Settling"	Tomorrow's Brightest Minds
2005	"Title and Registration"	Patrick Daughters
2005	"Soul Meets Body"	Jon Watts
2005	"Crooked Teeth"	Ace Norton
2006	"I Will Follow You into the Dark"	Jamie Thraves
2008	"I Will Possess Your Heart"	Aaron Stewart-Ahn and Shawn Kim
2008	"Cath…"	Autumn de Wilde
2008	"Grapevine Fires"	Walter Robot
2009	"Little Bribes"	Ross Ching
2009	"Meet Me on the Equinox"	Walter Robot
2011	"You Are a Tourist"	Tim Nackashi
2011	"Stay Young, Go Dancing"	Claire Carré
2012	"Underneath the Sycamore"	Walter Robot
2015	"Black Sun"	Robert Hales
2015	"The Ghosts of Beverly Drive"	Robert Hales
2016	"Good Help (Is So Hard to Find)"	Walter Robot
2016	"Million Dollar Loan"	Kyle Cogan
2018	"Gold Rush"	Alex Southam
2022	"Roman Candles"	Lance Bangs
2022	"Here to Forever"	Lance Bangs
2026	"Riptides"	Jason Lester
2026	"Punching The Flowers"	Jason Lester

== Other appearances ==
Year	Song	Album
2000	"Spring Break Broke"	Death Cab for Fiver (7", Barsuk (Bark #9))
2002	"Lowell, MA (Tiny Telephone Version)"	Amos House Collection Vol. 1
2002	"A Steadier Footing" (acoustic version)	Kicking It with Clowns / Comes With a Smile (Vol. 5)
2002	"Fortunate Son"	Don't Know When I'll Be Back Again
2003	"Styrofoam Plates"	Live The Dream: Fierce Panda Compilation Volume 2
2004	"This Temporary Life"	Future Soundtrack for America
2004	"Dream Scream"	The Late Great Daniel Johnston: Discovered Covered
2004	"A Movie Script Ending" (acoustic version)	Wicker Park (soundtrack)
2004	"Christmas (Baby Please Come Home)"	Maybe This Christmas Tree
2005	"Lightness" (live)	Paste Magazine (Sep/Aug 2005 issue CD)
2005	"Earth Angel"	Stubbs the Zombie: The Soundtrack
2005	"Lovesong"	For Unicef - Tsunami Relief Fund Compilation
2007	"Rockin' Chair"	Endless Highway: The Music of The Band
2007	"World Shut Your Mouth"	Causes 1
2008	"Jealousy Rides with Me"	Heroes: Original Soundtrack
2009	"Meet Me on the Equinox"	New Moon Soundtrack
2009	"Kicked In"	SCORE! 20 Years of Merge Records: The Covers!
2016	"Million Dollar Loan"	30 Days, 30 Songs
