= The New Year (song) =

Single by Death Cab for Cutie

from the album Transatlanticism
- Released: February 16, 2004
- Genre: Indie rock
- Length: 4:06
- Label: Barsuk
- Songwriters: Ben Gibbard; Nick Harmer; Jason McGerr; Chris Walla
- Producer: Chris Walla

Death Cab for Cutie singles chronology
"Title and Registration" (2003)	"The New Year" (2004)	"The Sound of Settling" (2004)

"The New Year" is a song recorded by American rock band Death Cab for Cutie. The song was released on February 16, 2004 as the second single from the group's fourth studio album Transatlanticism (2003).

== Background ==
Gibbard crafted the song's fictional protagonist as a mix of several different women he had met: "This song is about a person who came to me one day and said she wanted to be written about. So it's not really my story as much as it is hers." Lyrically, the song revolves around a melancholic New Years' party. Gibbard also has noted the song originated as more a folk song, but was expanded upon.

== Reception ==
The band's international distribution was split through several different labels, a common experience for indie groups. In the Netherlands, it was distributed by Munich Records. The 7" single was distributed in the United Kingdom through the label Fierce Panda. The single charted for one week on the UK Singles Chart, reaching number 86 on February 28, 2004.

== Charts ==
Chart (2004)	Peak position
UK Singles (Official Charts)	86
