= The John Byrd EP =

EP by Death Cab for Cutie
- Released: March 1, 2005
- Recorded: May 4–21, 2004
- Genre: Indie rock
- Length: 37:13
- Label: Barsuk

Death Cab for Cutie chronology
| Studio X Sessions EP (2004) | The John Byrd EP (2005) | Plans (2005) |

Professional ratings
Review scores
| Source | Rating |
|---|---|
| Drowned in Sound | (8/10) link |
| IGN | (8.3/10) link |
| Pitchfork Media | (6.5/10) link |

The John Byrd EP by the band Death Cab for Cutie was recorded live during their spring 2004 North American tour. It is named after the sound engineer that worked with them during the tour. The album was the band's last release on the indie label Barsuk Records. It was only available in a limited number of record stores and through the record label's website.

== Track listing ==
All songs written by Ben Gibbard except where noted.

| No. | Title | Writer(s) | Notes | Length |
|---|---|---|---|---|
| 1. | "We Laugh Indoors" | Ben Gibbard, Christopher Walla, Nick Harmer | recorded at The Wiltern, Los Angeles, CA on May 21, 2004 | 5:25 |
| 2. | "Why You'd Want to Live Here" | | recorded at The Showbox, Seattle, WA on May 8, 2004 | 5:03 |
| 3. | "Lightness" | | recorded at The Showbox, Seattle, WA on May 8, 2004 | 3:06 |
| 4. | "Photobooth" | | recorded at The Showbox, Seattle, WA on May 8, 2004 | 4:16 |
| 5. | "We Looked Like Giants" | Gibbard, Walla, Harmer, Jason McGerr | recorded at The Fillmore, San Francisco, CA on May 4, 2004 | 9:18 |
| 6. | "405" | | recorded at The Showbox, Seattle, WA on May 8, 2004 | 3:25 |
| 7. | "Blacking Out the Friction/Brand New Love" | Gibbard, Lou Barlow | recorded at The Wiltern, Los Angeles, CA on May 21, 2004 | 7:20 |
