= Drive Well, Sleep Carefully – On the Road with Death Cab for Cutie =

Drive Well, Sleep Carefully

Video by Death Cab for Cutie
- Released: July 26, 2005
- Recorded: Spring 2004
- Genre: Indie rock Indie pop
- Length: 127:00
- Label: Plexifilm
- Director: Justin Mitchell
- Producer: Gary Hustwit; Justin Mitchell

Death Cab for Cutie chronology
Drive Well, Sleep Carefully (2005)	Directions (2006)

Professional ratings
Review scores
Source	Rating
Allmusic	4/5 stars

Drive Well, Sleep Carefully – On the Road with Death Cab for Cutie is a live music DVD from the Seattle-based band Death Cab for Cutie. The DVD was filmed and directed by filmmaker Justin Mitchell during the band's Transatlanticism-tour in spring 2004 with a 16 mm film camera. The film premiered on June 10, 2005 at the Seattle International Film Festival and was released on DVD on July 26, 2005.

== DVD content ==
=== Live performances ===
1. "The Sound of Settling" (live at the Crystal Ballroom, Portland) – 5:36
2. "The New Year" (live at the Showbox, Seattle) – 4:31
3. "We Laugh Indoors" (live at the Marquee Theatre, Tempe) – 8:08
4. "Styrofoam Plates" (live at Trees, Dallas) – 6:35
5. "Title and Registration" (live at Howlin' Wolf, New Orleans) – 5:10
6. "Company Calls" (live at WorkPlay Theater, Birmingham) – 6:51
7. "Tiny Vessels" (live at Stubb's, Austin) – 3:50
8. "Transatlanticism" (live at Trees, Dallas) – 6:07
9. "Expo '86" (live at the Crystal Ballroom, Portland) – 4:00
10. "We Looked Like Giants" (live at the Fillmore, San Francisco) – 10:17
11. "Why You'd Want to Live Here" (live at the Wiltern, Los Angeles) – 8:55
12. "Prove My Hypotheses" (live at the Showbox, Seattle) – 5:11
13. "Bend to Squares" (live at the Showbox, Seattle) – 4:32*
- The performance of Bend to Squares appears after the end credits.

=== Acoustic tracks ===
1. "The New Year" (acoustic version, live at the Metreon, San Francisco) – 4:38
2. "Title and Registration" (acoustic version, live at the Metreon, San Francisco) – 3:44
3. "Lightness" (acoustic version, live at the Metreon, San Francisco) – 3:28

=== Bonus tracks ===
1. "Please Don't Go" (live) – 6:49
2. "Lightness" (demo version) – 4:21
3. "Stability" (live in rehearsal) – 10:03

=== Other content ===
- Interviews
- Backstage footage
- Outtakes/Deleted Scenes
