= Crooked Teeth (Death Cab for Cutie song) =

Single by Death Cab for Cutie

from the album Plans
- Released: March 10, 2006
- Recorded: Spring 2005
- Genre: Indie rock
- Length: 3:23
- Label: Atlantic
- Songwriters: Ben Gibbard, Chris Walla
- Producer: Chris Walla

Death Cab for Cutie singles chronology
"Soul Meets Body" (2005)	"Crooked Teeth" (2006)	"I Will Follow You into the Dark" (2006)

"Crooked Teeth" is a song by indie rock band Death Cab for Cutie, the second single from their 2005 album, Plans.

The single was released on Atlantic Records, featuring the song "Crooked Teeth" and two B-side tracks: "Talking Like Turnstiles", and a cover of the Julian Cope song "World Shut Your Mouth", which was originally released two years earlier as a B-side on the internet-only single "Title and Registration", from the band's previous album, Transatlanticism. The single peaked at number 10 on the U.S. Billboard Hot Modern Rock Tracks chart, making it Death Cab for Cutie's seventh highest charting song in the United States to-date. A music video for the song premiered on MTVU on February 6, 2006.

== Background ==
The song was co-written by lead singer and guitarist Ben Gibbard and guitarist Chris Walla. In a 2011 episode of VH1 Storytellers, Gibbard spoke about the back story behind the lyrical content of "Crooked Teeth":

One of my favorite, favorite writers in the whole world is a man named Raymond Carver and he had this way of writing stories about people living small lives going through some very, uh... their very own trials and tribulations in ways that I've always really admired. I wanted to kind of create a story that involved two characters that were trapped by geography in Southern Florida and that they were kind of keeping themselves captive and the city that surrounded them was seemingly closing in on them and this was the outcome of that experiment. This is my attempt to be a junior Raymond Carver.

— Benjamin Gibbard, VH1 Storytellers

== Track listing ==
=== UK 7" single #1 ===
1. "Crooked Teeth"
2. "World Shut Your Mouth"

=== UK 7" single #2 ===
1. "Crooked Teeth"
2. "Talking Like Turnstiles"

=== UK CD Single ===
1. "Crooked Teeth"
2. "Talking Like Turnstiles"
3. "Crooked Teeth" (Music Video)
4. "Making of Plans" (Documentary Video)

== Chart positions ==
Chart (2006)	Peak position
Australian ARIA singles chart	100
Canada Rock Top 30 (Radio & Records)	30
Scotland Singles (OCC)	43
UK Singles (OCC)	69
US Alternative Airplay (Billboard)	10

== Certifications ==
Region	Certification	Certified units/sales
United States (RIAA)	Gold	500,000^{‡}
^{‡} Sales+streaming figures based on certification alone.
