= Soul Meets Body =

Single by Death Cab for Cutie

from the album Plans
- Released: August 8, 2005
- Recorded: 2005
- Genre: Indie pop; indie rock
- Length: 3:50
- Label: Atlantic
- Songwriter: Ben Gibbard
- Producer: Chris Walla

Death Cab for Cutie singles chronology
"Title and Registration" (2004)	"Soul Meets Body" (2005)	"Crooked Teeth" (2006)

"Soul Meets Body" is a song recorded by the American rock band Death Cab for Cutie for their fifth studio album Plans (2005). It was released as the lead single from Plans in 2005, through Atlantic Records. Death Cab for Cutie emerged from the Pacific Northwest in the early aughts and built a following with its confessional lyricism and straightforward indie rock sound. "Soul Meets Body" was their first single for Atlantic, the major label with which they signed in 2004. The song is thematically existential, examining the intersection of soul and body though a relationship metaphor.

Singer-songwriter Ben Gibbard wrote the song, while guitarist Chris Walla produced the track. The song's music video depicts Gibbard wandering through a mysterious forest where musical notes lift out of plants. "Soul Meets Body" became the band's first hit single; it hit number one on Billboard's Adult Alternative Songs chart, and the top five of the Hot Modern Rock Tracks. It was their first to cross over to the all-genre Hot 100, where it peaked at No. 60. The song has been certified platinum by the Recording Industry Association of America for shipments of over 1,000,000 copies.

== Background ==
"Soul Meets Body" was written by frontman Ben Gibbard, and produced by guitarist Chris Walla. The song was recorded at Long View Farm, a farmstead in North Brookfield, Massachusetts. The song opens with the sound of an uptempo acoustic guitar, leading to a chorus where Gibbard exclaims, "You're the only song I want to hear / A melody softly soaring through my atmosphere." Gibbard wrote the song for his girlfriend at the time. Throughout the song's lyrics, Gibbard touches on transcendental themes: in the song's hook, he pleads that "if the silence takes you then I hope it takes me too." Walla summarized the song's message: "It's a declaration of desire over circumstance. It means, 'Here's where I am and here's what I want to be and how do I bridge those two things.' I think it's a beautiful articulation of love, friendships and relationships and everything you do over the course of the day."

Gibbard recalled laboring over the song and follow-up single "Crooked Teeth": "We spent all this time trying to get "Soul Meets Body" and "Crooked Teeth" just right to make sure we were putting our best foot forward," he said.

== Music video ==
The song's music video was directed by Jon Watts. In the clip, frontman Gibbard waltzes across a magical woodland as foliage transforms into music notes. Gibbard picked Watts, a relative outsider, to helm the clip as he appreciated that his treatment was not simply a literal reading of the song's prose: "It's hard to pick videos, because when I write lyrics I try to make them as descriptive as possible, and I find it hard to find a treatment that's not just mimicking what's happening in the song [...] Plus this one was a little weird," he said. It was filmed on August 3, 2005 at a ranch-style house located in Topanga Canyon in Los Angeles. Writers for Entertainment Weekly described the clip as "odd and lovely." The band later issued a second video for the song directed by Cat Solen as part of its Directions: The Plans Video Album (2006).

== Release and chart performance ==
"Soul Meets Body" was the lead single from Plans, though the band debated over which single to lead with, between it and second single "Crooked Teeth". In the end, the group chose the former because of its "slower build and [lack of] a traditional radio-friendly chorus," so as to not overachieve. The song was leaked online prior to its official release, which prompted Walla to respond, "I love it. The more anarchy we can give to the record industry, the better." The song debuted on July 16, 2005, available to stream at the band's MySpace page until July 22. It was a popular song on the site, garnering 400,000 streams within two months. From there, it was available for listening on the band's official site, with the label delivering it to radio on September 13. "Soul Meets Body" became one of the band's biggest singles on radio, with its popularity boosting sales of its parent album significantly. Colin Stutz at the Hollywood Reporter called it a "massive radio hit." It became the group's first song to chart on the all-genre Hot 100, where it peaked at number 60 and spent eighteen weeks.

It became their first number one single on any chart when it led Billboard's Adult Alternative Songs for ten weeks; it rose to the summit after eight weeks on the ranking. It peaked at number five on the publication's Modern Rock ranking, and charted on it for 26 weeks. For the band, the newfound radio success came as a shock: "I had this idea that it would get played on the couple stations that have already played us. I'm really taken aback by how popular it is," Gibbard told Billboard. In February 2021, for the 25th anniversary of Adult Alternative Songs (which by then had been renamed to Adult Alternative Airplay), Billboard ranked "Soul Meets Body" at number 19 on its list of the 100 most successful songs in the chart's history.

== Critical reception ==
"Soul Meets Body" was received to mostly positive reviews from critics. Rob Sheffield at Rolling Stone considered a high point on Plans, complimenting its "R.E.M.-style jangle, sped up to electro-disco tempo." Joe Tangari, in his review for Pitchfork, suggested it was one of the better "experiments" on Plans, calling it a " a sleek pop track." James Rettig of Stereogum interpreted the song's lyrics as more bleak than romantic, noting that "Gibbard's describing the joining of body and mind, but he’s making it clear that there’s only emptiness in between the two." Nick Sylvester at The Village Voice criticized the band's risk-taking, but nonetheless felt the single was "expertly produced and succinctly written." Marc Vera at Entertainment Weekly called it an "indie-pop gem," while Rodrigo Perez at MTV interpreted it as "grappl[ing] with existential questions and reconciling personal needs.

It was described as having a "haunting, slow drawl" by Caitlin Petrakovitz of The Daily Aztec, whilst Elisa Bray of The Independent said that the song is "one of their best melodies" and said the lyrics, "a melody softly soaring through my atmosphere", sums up the effect of the song on its listener. Tom Woods of MusicOMH, said features such as "jangling acoustic guitar strumming throughout, and a wonderfully upbeat rhythm accompanying lyrics of loss and wonderment" gave the song a "distinct" resemblance to R.E.M.'s song, "Losing My Religion". Virgin Media, however, said the song was "slightly academic indie with a hint of Idlewild and Snow Patrol about it". Drowned in Sound writer, Mike Diver, stated that "Soul Meets Body" has "tender, lovelorn lyrics that anyone over the age of ten can relate to coupled with the kind of shimmering indie-pop that a thousand imitators have failed to fully master [...] It says both everything to the listener and a whole lot of nothing at all, its perception entirely dependent on the type of ear bending its way." Diver finished the review by describing the song (in regards to its origin on the album it is a track on) as being "sourced from a central vein yielding little else of value", an element that "leaves a bitter aftertaste that lingers long after the sound of silence settles."

== Other versions ==
Gibbard later reimagined the song, with the help of Brett Nelson from Built to Spill, in an electronic-infused iteration for The Electronic Anthology Project (2013). In 2019, the song was covered by New Zealand act the Beths.

== Track listing ==
1. "Soul Meets Body"
2. "Jealousy Rides with Me"

== Charts ==
=== Weekly charts ===
Weekly chart performance for "Soul Meets Body"
Chart (2005–2006)	Peak position
Canada Rock Top 30 (Radio & Records)	22
Scotland Singles (OCC)	82
UK Singles (OCC)	125
UK Rock & Metal (OCC)	5
US Billboard Hot 100	60
US Adult Alternative Airplay (Billboard)	1
US Adult Pop Airplay (Billboard)	32
US Alternative Airplay (Billboard)	5

=== Year-end charts ===
2005 year-end chart performance for "Soul Meets Body"
Chart (2005)	Position
US Modern Rock Tracks (Billboard)	64

2006 year-end chart performance for "Soul Meets Body"
Chart (2006)	Position
US Alternative Songs (Billboard)	39

== Certifications ==
Certifications for "Soul Meets Body"
Region	Certification	Certified units/sales
Canada (Music Canada)	Gold	40,000^{‡}
United States (RIAA)	Platinum	1,000,000^{‡}
^{‡} Sales+streaming figures based on certification alone.

== Release history ==
Release dates and formats for "Soul Meets Body"
Region	Date	Format(s)	Label(s)	Ref.
United States	July 16, 2005	MySpace		
United States	September 13, 2005	Radio	Atlantic Records	
