= Directions: The Plans Video Album =

Video by Death Cab for Cutie
- Released: April 11, 2006
- Genre: Indie rock, indie pop
- Length: 2:20:00
- Label: Atlantic, Warner Music Group
- Director: Various (see below)

Death Cab for Cutie chronology
Drive Well, Sleep Carefully (2005)	Directions: The Plans Video Album (2006)

Directions: The Plans Video Album is a video album from Death Cab for Cutie, corresponding to their major-label debut album Plans. It was released on April 11, 2006, on Atlantic Records/Warner Music Group. Conceptualized by executive producers Aaron Stewart-Ahn and the band's bass player Nick Harmer proposals from around the world were submitted to Death Cab for Cutie, and a budget was allowed for 12 finalists to create videos that would translate their visions of every song from Plans. Directions also includes an interview with the band, directors' statements, treatments and profiles, animatics, and artwork, along with two bonus videos, "Jealousy Rides with Me" and "Talking Like Turnstiles".

At the 2007 Grammy Awards, the videos were nominated for Best Long Form Music Video, but they lost to Bruce Springsteen.

== DVD content ==
=== Track listing ===
1. "Marching Bands of Manhattan (version #2)" (Director: P.R. Brown)
2. "Soul Meets Body (version #2)" (Director: Cat Solen)
3. "Summer Skin" (Director: Lightborne)
4. "Different Names for the Same Thing" (Director: Autumn de Wilde)
5. "I Will Follow You into the Dark" (Director: Monkmus)
6. "Your Heart Is an Empty Room" (Director: Jeffrey Brown; Animator: Eliza Kinkz)
7. "Someday You Will Be Loved" (Director: Ace Norton)
8. "Crooked Teeth (version #2)" (Director: Rob Schrab)
9. "What Sarah Said" (Director: Laurent Briet)
10. "Brothers on a Hotel Bed (version #1)" (Director: Josh Victor Rothstein)
11. "Stable Song" (Director: Aaron Stewart-Ahn)

DVD only

1. "Jealousy Rides With Me" (Director: Keith Schofield)
2. "Talking Like Turnstiles" (Director: Lance Bangs)

iTunes only

1. "Directions Interview"
2. "Directions Trailer"

=== Other content ===
- Band interview
- Directors' statements and profiles
