= Field Manual =

Studio album by Chris Walla
- Released: 29 January 2008
- Studio: Grouse Lodge, Co Westmeath, Ireland, Mushroom Studios, Vancouver
- Genre: Indie rock
- Label: Barsuk
- Producer: Chris Walla and Warne Livesey

Chris Walla chronology
Martin Youth Auxiliary (1999)	Field Manual (2008)	Tape Loops (2015)

Professional ratings
Review scores
Source	Rating
AllMusic	3.5/5 stars
Crawdaddy!	(mixed)
Pitchfork Media	(5.9/10)
Patrol Magazine	(4.6/10)

Field Manual is the debut solo album by Death Cab for Cutie guitarist Chris Walla, released on January 29, 2008 on Barsuk Records. This is Walla's first album under his own name. It was previously speculated that Walla may use a moniker, most likely Martin Youth Auxiliary, under which to release the album.

The album was originally named It Is Unsustainable.

== Release ==
Walla originally announced on his Hall of Justice Recording site that the album would be released in March 2007, but Field Manual was pushed back to September 2007. The album was then set for a later release date of January 29, 2008. The record was released in Australia via Architecture, the same label that released three Death Cab for Cutie albums. Warne Livesey co-produced the album with Walla.

All tracks performed by Chris Walla, except drums on 2, 5, 6, 8, 9, and 10 by Kurt Dahle (of The New Pornographers); drums on songs 3, 7, and 11 by Jason McGerr (of Death Cab for Cutie)

== Track listing ==
1. "Two-Fifty" - 3:31
2. "The Score" - 2:58
3. "Sing Again" - 2:31
4. "A Bird Is a Song" - 3:08
5. "Geometry &C" - 3:07
6. "Everyone Needs a Home" - 3:06
7. "Everybody On" - 3:17
8. "Our Plans, Collapsing" - 3:56
9. "Archer v. Light" - 3:06
10. "St. Modesto" 4:27
11. "It's Unsustainable" - 5:56
12. "Holes" - 2:40
13. "Every Tic" (Australian Bonus Track)
14. "Like a Spark" (Australian Bonus Track)

== Bonus tracks ==
Copies pre-ordered from the Barsuk shop before February 4, 2008 received three downloadable non-album MP3 bonus tracks.

1. "Like a Spark" - 4:31
2. "Sing Again (2006 Demo)" - 2:32
3. "Our Plans, Collapsing (2006 Demo)" - 3:47
