= Studio X Sessions EP =

EP by Death Cab for Cutie
- Released: July 27, 2004
- Genre: Indie rock
- Length: 14:28
- Label: Barsuk Records

Death Cab for Cutie chronology
Transatlanticism (2003)	Studio X Sessions EP (2004)	The John Byrd EP (2005)

Studio X Sessions EP (2004) is an EP by Death Cab for Cutie. It was released exclusively on Apple's iTunes Music Store website.

== Track listing ==
The E.P. consists of new versions of four songs that had all been recorded and released previously:

No.	Title	Note	Length
1.	"The New Year"	from Transatlanticism	3:44
2.	"Blacking Out the Friction"	from The Photo Album	2:15
3.	"Bend to Squares"	from Something About Airplanes	4:10
4.	"Army Corps of Architects"	from Sub Pop Singles Club March 2000 / You Can Play These Songs with Chords + 10	4:20

A new version of the Death Cab for Cutie song "Lightness" was also recorded during these sessions, and it was released on "The Sound of Settling" CD-single.
