= Title and Registration =

Single by Death Cab for Cutie

from the album Transatlanticism
- Released: 2005
- Recorded: Spring 2003
- Genre: Indie rock; art rock
- Length: 3:39
- Label: Fierce Panda
- Songwriters: Ben Gibbard, Chris Walla
- Producer: Chris Walla

Death Cab for Cutie singles chronology
"The Sound of Settling" (2004)	"Title and Registration" (2005)	"Soul Meets Body" (2005)

"Title and Registration" is a song by indie rock band Death Cab for Cutie, the third single from their fourth studio album, Transatlanticism.

It was officially released in 2005, as an internet-only single that could be streamed through the band's website, while promotional copies of the single were released on CD. The single also included a cover of the Julian Cope song "World Shut Your Mouth", which was also later released on the "Crooked Teeth" single on Death Cab for Cutie's follow-up album, Plans.

== Background ==
The original version of "Title and Registration", available on its original CD single, is a markedly different iteration of the song. When mixing the album, Chris Walla felt dissatisfied with the song's upbeat tempo and tone in contrast with its suspenseful lyrics. He utilized a Lexicon Varispeech, a piece of hardware normally used in speech therapy, to crush the drum sounds into something more minimal, and he also slowed its tempo and altered its guitar and bass lines.

== Live performance ==
Due to the song's layered instrumentation, "Title and Registration" has been difficult to play during live performances in the past, and thus has been performed a variety of ways. All of these involved guitarist Chris Walla switching halfway through the song from lead guitar to keyboards, whilst singer/guitarist Ben Gibbard took over the guitar part.

For the first half of the song, initially, both Gibbard and drummer Jason McGerr used electronic drums in order to replicate the distinctive drum machine sound used at the beginning of the song. In the band's 2008 tour, Gibbard performed the entire first two verses as lead vocalist, without a guitar or drums, before picking up his guitar as Walla switched to the keyboard. In later tours, Gibbard kept his electric guitar strapped on for the entirety of the song, but used a shaker as percussion during the song's first two verses. Since the band has expanded to a five-piece, without Walla, the song has been able to be performed live without any instrument swapping.

== Music video ==
The music video was filmed in early December 2004 and released in February 2005. It was directed by Patrick Daughters and consists of frontman Ben Gibbard lying on an operating table while undergoing a "surgery" (as done by the other band members) to receive a new heart. Although Ben seems to act calm and has the ability to sing throughout the procedure, he was not given anesthetics nor was he on any form of life support. During the surgery, it is revealed that Gibbard's chest is simply paper, model organs, and a model rib cage.

== Track listing ==
1. "Title and Registration" (Album version)
2. "Title and Registration" (Original version)
3. "World Shut Your Mouth" (Julian Cope cover)

‘World Shut Your Mouth’ was later rereleased as a B-Side to “Crooked Teeth” off of their 2005 album, “Plans”.
