= Jason McGerr =

American drummer (born 1974)

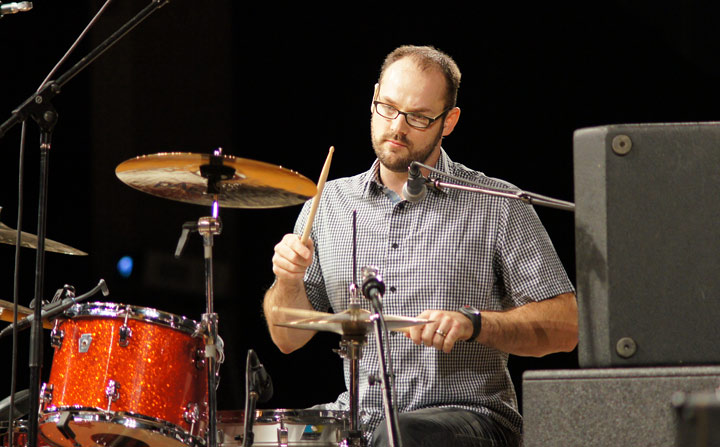
- McGerr performing in 2013

Background information
- Born: July 19, 1974 (age 52); Bellingham, Washington, U.S.
- Genres: Alternative rock; indie rock; indie pop; emo
- Occupation: Drummer
- Years active: 1996–present
- Member of: Death Cab for Cutie
- Formerly of: Krusters Kronomid; Eureka Farm; Rockin' Teenage Combo

Jason McGerr (born July 19, 1974) is an American musician, best known as the drummer for the indie rock band Death Cab for Cutie.

== Musical career ==
=== Early years ===
McGerr was born and raised in Bellingham, Washington. At age ten, he began learning to play the drums in order to get into his middle school band. By 16, he was playing paid gigs at local bars. In a 2018 interview with KEXP, he stated that he knew he wanted to do drumming professionally when he heard Led Zeppelin's "Black Dog" for the first time at 14. He was an avid fisher growing up, and worked at H&H Sporting Goods, a local fly shop, throughout high school.

McGerr was previously in the bands Krusters Kronomid and Eureka Farm, as well as the jazz trio Rockin' Teenage Combo. In the Rush: Beyond the Lighted Stage documentary, McGerr identified drummer Neil Peart as his hero.

=== Death Cab for Cutie ===
McGerr joined the Bellingham, Washington-based indie rock band Death Cab for Cutie in early 2003, to replace drummer Michael Schorr. Two members of the band, Ben Gibbard and Nick Harmer, had previously played in Eureka Farm, where McGerr was Gibbard's replacement. McGerr debuted on Death Cab for Cutie's fourth album, Transatlanticism, released in October 2003, featuring two songs co-written by McGerr. The release of Transatlanticism to critical acclaim and strong commercial performance (and eventual gold certification by the Recording Industry Association of America) brought Death Cab for Cutie mainstream success. Speaking in 2003, Benjamin Gibbard notes that he "definitely believe[s] this will be the last drummer we'll ever have. It's kind of come full circle. It makes more sense having him than it has anyone else that's ever played with us."

=== Other projects ===
McGerr was a guest performer on Tegan and Sara's album The Con, released in July 2007, and can be seen recording in studio with them on the DVD entitled The Con DVD by Tegan and Sara. He also played drums for their next album, Sainthood, released in October 2009. McGerr played drums on half of the tracks on Matt Nathanson's 2007 album, Some Mad Hope, and was a guest drummer on Nathanson's 2009 album, Modern Love. McGerr also performed drums on three songs for his Death Cab for Cutie bandmate Chris Walla's debut solo album, Field Manual, released in 2008.

In June 2007, McGerr opened his own recording studio, Two Sticks Audio, located in Seattle. Various act have recorded there, including Smoosh, Barcelona, Only Human, Moros Eros, Grand Archives, David Bazan, Mark Kozelek, Matt Cameron of Pearl Jam, Tegan and Sara, Alligators and Death Cab for Cutie. After the opening of his studio, McGerr began working with Swedish music computer software company Propellerhead Software, on an expansion pack for their software program Reason 4. The pack was "The Jason McGerr Sessions", and it is available as a "ReFill" from the Propellerhead website, and as a stand-alone from the Drummerheads website.

McGerr is an instructor at the Seattle Drum School and has also helped and mentored teen indie-pop group Smoosh (Chaos Chaos).

== Equipment ==
McGerr currently plays Gretsch Drums, Remo drumheads, Zildjian (formerly Paiste) cymbals, Vic Firth drumsticks, and Drum Workshop pedals and hardware.

Cymbals: Zildjian

Live:

- 14" A Zildjian New Beat Hi-Hats
- 19" K Zildjian Sweet Crash
- 23" A Zildjian Sweet Ride
- 20" K Zildjian Sweet Crash

Studio:

- 15" Kerope Hi-Hats
- 18" Kerope
- 22" Kerope
- 20" Kerope

Jason also has a set of 1960s/70s Avedis Hi-Hats that have appeared on several Death Cab recordings. He also has an assortment of cymbals from Zildjian's K Constantinople and A Avedis lines, however the set-ups above are his most used.

His former Paiste cymbal setup was as follows: 14" Formula 602 Classic Sounds Medium Hi-hats; 18" Formula 602 Classic Sounds Thin Crash; 20" Formula 602 Classic Sounds Thin Crash; 21" Masters Medium Ride.

McGerr previously played Craviotto drums and Ludwig Drums.

== Discography ==
=== Death Cab for Cutie ===
- Transatlanticism (October 7, 2003, Barsuk)
- Plans (August 30, 2005, Atlantic)
- Narrow Stairs (May 13, 2008, Atlantic)
- Open Door EP (March 31, 2009, Atlantic)
- Codes and Keys (May 31, 2011, Atlantic)
- Kintsugi (March 31, 2015, Atlantic)
- Thank You for Today (August 17, 2018, Atlantic)
- Asphalt Meadows (September 16, 2022, Atlantic)
- I Built You a Tower (June 5, 2026, Anti-)

=== Other credits ===
- Travis Morrison – Travistan (2004, Barsuk)
- Tegan and Sara – The Con (2007, Sire)
- Matt Nathanson – Some Mad Hope (2007, Vanguard)
- Chris Walla – Field Manual (2008, Barsuk)
- Tegan and Sara – Sainthood (2009, Sire)
- Matt Nathanson – Modern Love (2011, Vanguard)
- Frank Turner – FTHC (2022)
