= The Open Door EP =

EP by Death Cab for Cutie
- Released: March 31, 2009
- Genre: Alternative rock
- Labels: Atlantic; Barsuk
- Producer: Chris Walla

Death Cab for Cutie chronology
| Narrow Stairs (2008) | The Open Door EP (2009) | Codes and Keys (2011) |

Professional ratings
Aggregate scores
| Source | Rating |
|---|---|
| Metacritic | 77/100 |
Review scores
| Source | Rating |
| AllMusic | 3.5/5 stars |
| The A.V. Club | B+ |
| IGN | 8.4/10 |
| No Ripcord | 7/10 stars |
| Now | 3/5 stars |
| Paste | 8.1/10 |
| Robert Christgau | A− |
| Rolling Stone | 3.5/5 stars |
| Under the Radar | 6/10 stars |

The Open Door EP is an extended play by band Death Cab for Cutie, comprising songs recorded during the Narrow Stairs sessions and a demo version of the track "Talking Bird" from the album.

Regarding the release, Ben Gibbard states:

Were all written with the songs from Narrow Stairs during, I guess, what would be the end of 2006 into 2007, as we were moving towards recording the album. All these songs, with the exception of "Little Bribes," were recorded during the sessions for Narrow Stairs.

The album was nominated for Best Alternative Music Album at the 52nd Grammy Awards.

== Track listing ==
All songs written by Ben Gibbard except where noted.

| No. | Title | Writer(s) | Length |
|---|---|---|---|
| 1. | "Little Bribes" | | 2:46 |
| 2. | "A Diamond and a Tether" | | 3:58 |
| 3. | "My Mirror Speaks" | Gibbard/Nick Harmer | 3:30 |
| 4. | "I Was Once a Loyal Lover" | | 3:23 |
| 5. | "Talking Bird" (demo) | | 3:19 |

iTunes Store bonus track
| No. | Title | Length |
|---|---|---|
| 6. | "Grapevine Fires" (music video) | 4:20 |

== Release history ==
The EP was initially released digitally on March 31, 2009, followed by a physical CD release on April 7, 2009 at live performances and a retail release on April 14, 2009. It has peaked at #30 on the Billboard 200.
