= The Sound of Settling =

2003 single by Death Cab for Cutie

Single by Death Cab for Cutie

from the album Transatlanticism
- Released: December 26, 2003
- Recorded: Spring 2003
- Genre: Indie rock; indie pop
- Length: 2:13
- Label: Fierce Panda
- Songwriter: Ben Gibbard
- Producer: Chris Walla

Death Cab for Cutie singles chronology
"The New Year" (2004)	"The Sound of Settling" (2003)	"Title and Registration" (2004)

"The Sound of Settling" is a song by American indie rock band Death Cab for Cutie, the second single from their fourth studio album, Transatlanticism, released on December 26, 2003. The song reached number 84 on the UK Singles Chart, was featured on various movie soundtracks, and became the third song by the band to be featured on the television show The O.C..

An acoustic demo for "The Sound of Settling" was featured on the Transatlanticism Demos LP released by Barsuk Records in 2013, to celebrate the ten-year anniversary of Transatlanticism's release.

== Development ==
Written by Ben Gibbard, the song is notable for its upbeat style and the "Bop bah" sung during the chorus. Gibbard originally did not like the song, due to his personal distaste of uptempo songs, and had intended to discard it. Despite Gibbard being reluctant to include it on Transatlanticism, guitarist and producer Chris Walla insisted that it be included on the album.

== Music video ==
The video begins with a picture frame containing an image of velvet curtains. When the song starts the camera zooms out from the picture frame mounted on an easel, a scene is performed for a few seconds before the camera zooms out again, and the cycle repeats until the end of the song. These scenes alternate between the band members playing their instruments seriously, and humorous unrelated scenes featuring gospel singers, a drunk man, cheerleaders, an astronaut, chefs, a gingerbread man, as well as the band playing miniature instruments.

The video bears a resemblance to the music video for The New Pornographers' song "Letter from an Occupant".

== Track listing ==
=== UK CD Single ===
1. "The Sound of Settling"
2. "Lightness (Live at Studio X)"
3. "That's Incentive"

=== UK Vinyl 7" single ===
1. "The Sound of Settling"
2. "This Charming Man" (Smiths cover)

== Charts ==
Chart (2004)	Peak position
UK Singles (Official Charts)	84
UK Indie (Official Charts)	21

== Appearances in other media ==
The song was featured as a free download in the popular video game Tap Tap Revenge 2 from the App Store for the iPhone OS.

It was featured in Season 2 of The O.C., in the twentieth episode "The O.C. Confidential".

The song is mentioned in the song "Bukowski" by the British band Moose Blood in the line "Introduce you to Clarity, teach you the words to The Sound Of Settling".

The song was also featured on the soundtracks for two movies, Wedding Crashers, and Mean Creek.

The song was also famously featured in the trailer for the 2005 romantic comedy drama Shopgirl, starring Steve Martin, Claire Danes, and Jason Schwartzman.
