= Plans (album) =

Studio album by Death Cab for Cutie
- Released: August 30, 2005
- Recorded: 2005
- Studios: Long View Farm (North Brookfield); Smart Studios (Madison, Wisconsin)
- Genres: Indie pop; indie rock; alternative rock
- Length: 44:25
- Labels: Atlantic; Barsuk
- Producer: Chris Walla

Death Cab for Cutie chronology
Transatlanticism (2003)	Plans (2005)	Narrow Stairs (2008)

Singles from Plans
- 1. "Soul Meets Body" Released: August 8, 2005; 2. "Crooked Teeth" Released: March 10, 2006; 3. "I Will Follow You into the Dark" Released: July 17, 2006

Plans is the fifth studio album by American rock band Death Cab for Cutie, released August 30, 2005 on Atlantic Records. Emerging from the Pacific Northwest in the early 2000s, Death Cab first rose to prominence on the strength of its confessional lyricism and textured indie rock sound. Following a longstanding partnership with indie label Barsuk, the band made the leap to a major label, Atlantic, for Plans. The LP was the band's first time recording outside of their Seattle home; it was produced at Long View Farm, a rural Massachusetts property.

Plans propelled the band into the mainstream, reaching the top five of the Billboard 200 and scoring a Grammy nomination for Best Alternative Music Album. The album spawned three singles, including "Soul Meets Body" and "Crooked Teeth". The third single "I Will Follow You into the Dark" became the band's most popular song to date, also garnering a Grammy nod for the Best Pop Performance by a Duo or Group with Vocals. Plans was certified platinum by the Recording Industry Association of America in 2008.

== Background ==
Death Cab for Cutie emerged in the early aughts out of the Pacific Northwest independent music scene, spearheaded by singer-songwriter Ben Gibbard. The group first formed in Bellingham, Washington, a small college town by the Canada–United States border. Gibbard recruited bassist Nick Harmer and guitarist/producer Chris Walla to record the band's early demos, and shuffled through drummers before adding Jason McGerr on the kit in 2003. The group's first albums were issued through local boutique label Barsuk Records, with increasing listenership and industry attention. Their overseas distribution was complex, with at least seven indie imprints handling their albums in different countries. By the time the group issued their fourth LP, Transatlanticism (2003), the band found themselves fielding offers from the major labels. Their burgeoning success, coupled with Gibbard's similarly successful side project the Postal Service, led the band to ink a lucrative long-term contract with Atlantic Records in November 2004.

The move suggested a shift in the perception of "indie" bands in the mainstream, and triggered accusations of inauthenticity. The move polarized fans, who took to message boards to worry that creative control would be diminished with the corporate expectations of a major. The band, with its softer, sometimes piano-led sound, was frequently compared to Coldplay, one of the biggest alternative rock groups globally at that time. A&R executives had hoped the band would function as America's answer to Coldplay. The band were aware of these claims; though they outwardly suggested in interviews nothing would change, Gibbard later admitted "the reality was, there was a ton of pressure." Harmer agreed: "It really didn't change the way we worked creatively, but there certainly was enough psychological pressure that was kind of soaking in and seeping in, and I think we were carrying a lot of that stuff around with us, whether we knew it then or not."

== Writing and recording ==
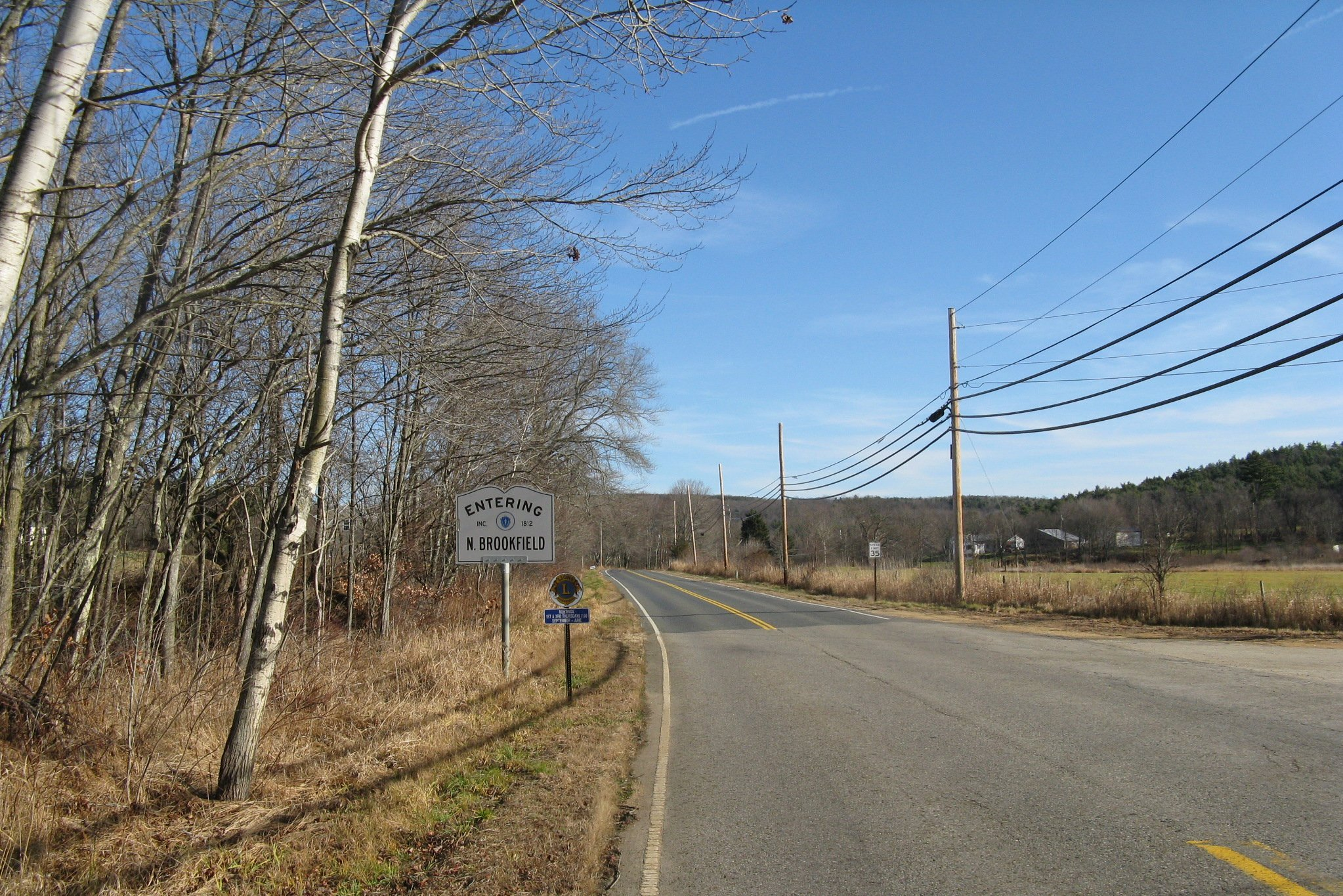
Plans was largely recorded in the Massachusetts countryside.

Plans came at a time of professional transition for the quartet. The group had been promoting themselves relentlessly, touring nonstop. Gibbard found it difficult to write during the exhaustive touring cycle. Inspired by Nick Drake's songwriting process, he rented an apartment in Seattle and filled it with a piano, guitars, and his laptop to focus in. "I'd treat it like a job and just go to my office. It has a view of the Space Needle and the mountains," he told Rolling Stone. Meanwhile, Walla, who had struggled with his dedication to being in the band, re-committed himself to it. Gibbard likened its quick turnaround to the production process that crafted the group's third album, The Photo Album; "I was in the ninth inning trying to finish the last couple songs," he told Vice in 2018. "There are a few songs I see now and think, 'Yeah, that one's pretty undercooked.'" He specifically singled out "Someday You Will Be Loved" as perhaps his "least favorite song I've ever written," considering its lyrics mean-spirited and "weak".

With their first major-label recording budget, Death Cab opted to rent a month at Long View Farm Studios in North Brookfield, Massachusetts, their first recording locale outside their home in the Pacific Northwest. Founded three decades prior by a Clark University professor, Long View was a popular facility at the time, utilized by other indie artists such as LCD Soundsystem and Brand New to track their albums. Its rural location led Gibbard to joke that it was "the kind of place a label sends a band if the singer's a junkie and they need to get him away from the bad things in the city." He and his bandmates lived in a converted barn while working, rising by 10 A.M. each day to track guitar, bass, and drum tracks. The group worked to perform perfectly, recording each part separately. They spent significant amounts of time perfecting the record's first two singles, "Soul Meets Body" and "Crooked Teeth". The band sequenced Plans with its running order on LP in mind, envisioning it as a complete piece to be taken as a whole.

The band aimed to remain frugal with Atlantic's "sizable" budget, only taking advantage of the opportunity to re-record certain instruments after the fact. The isolation grew boring for the group, particularly Harmer and Gibbard, who frequently took trips to the only local liquor store. Walla claimed to work for twelve hours per day behind the recording console, where he felt most at home. Vocals and mixing were completed at a later date in Seattle, with additional recording taking place at Avast!, Robert Lang Studios, the Hall of Justice and Skrocki there. The album was mixed at Smart Studios in Madison, Wisconsin.

=== Technical ===
Plans was the band's first all-digital recording, with prior efforts created on analog multitrack equipment. It was tracked on iZ Technology RADAR Studio Recording System, a digital multitrack recorder which featured an Adrenaline Plus recording engine and S-Nyquist (192 kHz) analogue I/O card. Walla directed the switch from analog to digital after conversations with friends who had utilized RADAR, and with the foresight that Plans might require different mix engineers in different phases of the process: "It seems nobody wants to send reels of tape anymore," he bemoaned to Mix. The result is a more sonically rich recording for the quartet, who had previously been known for lo-fi elements.

A specific source of inspiration for Plans was Pink Floyd's seminal 1973 LP The Dark Side of the Moon. Walla heavily used the Chandler Limited TG1 Abbey Road Special Edition, a compressor offering an authentic re-creation of the EMI TG12413, a limiter used on Dark Side of the Moon, as well as the Beatles' Abbey Road. "It's all over the whole record: piano, vocals, bass guitar, drums, like drum overheads," he revealed to Mix. "Everywhere I could smash it in, I did. I really like it a lot." Other pieces of equipment frequently utilized included a Millennia HV-3D 8-channel microphone preamplifier, and the Lexicon Varispeech, a digital pitch shifter, which Walla used to enhance drum sounds, particularly snare hits. The band resisted the modern urge to crush the audio level of the mix—a trend popular in the music at that time known as the loudness war.

== Composition and themes ==
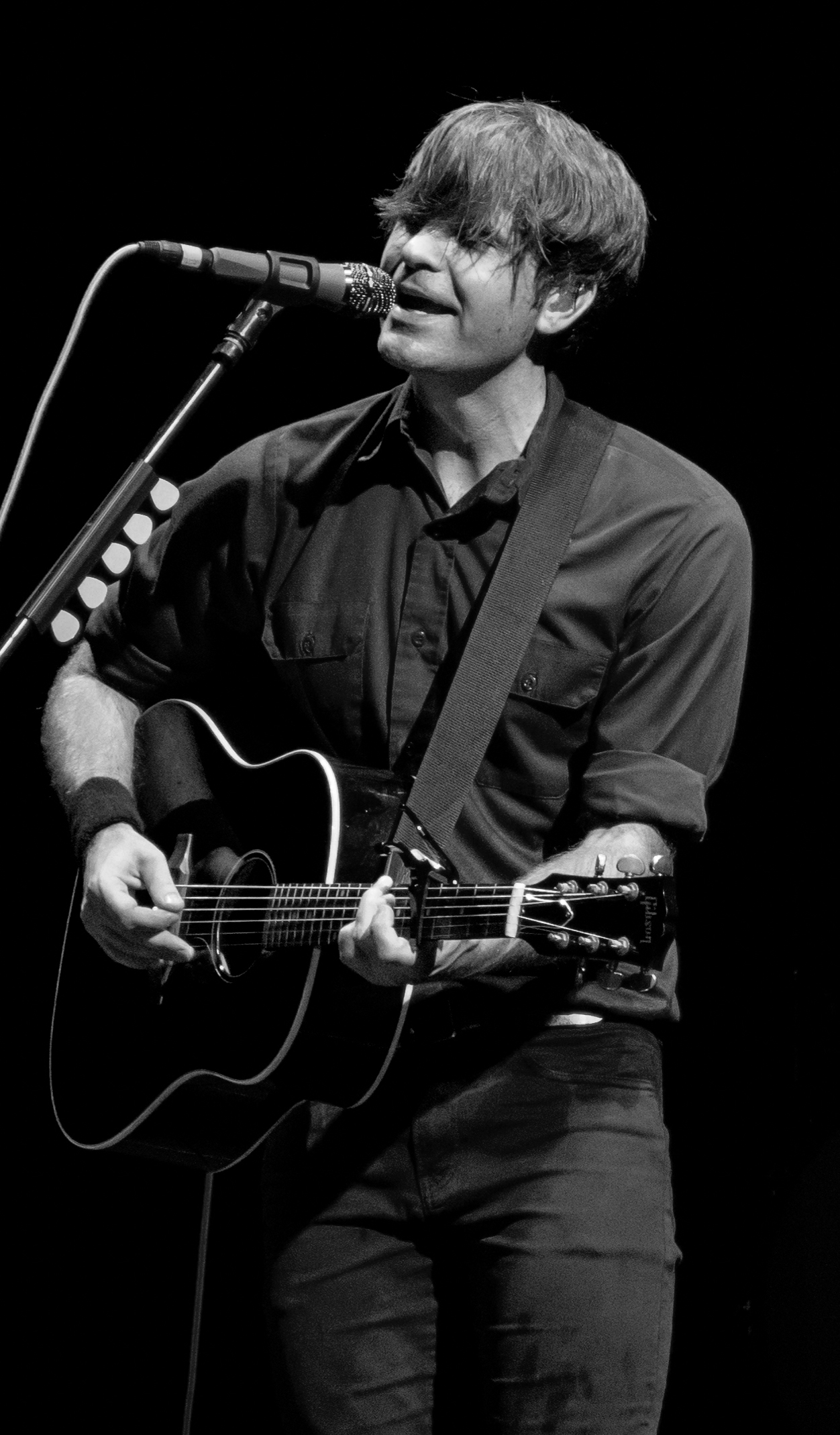
Ben Gibbard, the group's chief lyricist.

Musically, Plans consists of "relaxed, mid-tempo pop material." The album's title stemmed from a joke Gibbard liked: "How do you make God laugh? Make a plan." He expounded upon this in an interview: "Nobody ever makes a plan that they're gonna go out and get hit by a car. A plan almost always has a happy ending. Essentially, every plan is a tiny prayer to Father Time. I really like the idea of a plan not being seen as having definite outcomes, but more like little wishes." Though Gibbard considered its tone optimistic, he conceded a meditation on mortality runs through the album. Drummer Jason McGerr noted the continuity between Plans and the Death Cab for Cutie's previous album, Transatlanticism. McGerr stated "if Transatlanticism was an inhale, Plans is the exhale."

Gibbard wrote "I Will Follow You Into the Dark" about succeeding a lover in death; he wrote the song for his girlfriend at the time. "What Sarah Said" focuses on loss; it depicts a trip to the hospital to see an ill loved one. Gibbard captures the anxiety of pacing a waiting room, and concludes that "Love is watching someone die." Meanwhile, "Brothers on a Hotel Bed" addresses possible languor in a long-time relationship, incorporating "shuffling polyrhythms" into its composition. The record's closing track, "Stable Song", is a rearrangement of "Stability", which was released on an EP in 2002.

== Commercial performance ==
Expectations for the band's major-label move were high, with the group viewed as poised for a major breakthrough. Plans was properly announced in July 2005. Barsuk remained involved in the band, with the label's logo appearing on the back cover of Plans, and the label retaining the rights to release it on vinyl. The band suggested that fans download the record for free.

The group issued "Soul Meets Body" in advance of the album as its lead single, streaming on their website. It was worked at U.S. radio that September. The album arrived after a heavy marketing campaign, including a pre-order push and increased storefront positioning. Plans was released to independent record stores prior to its worldwide debut, making its bow on August 23. That same day, the album became available for streaming exclusively on MTVU.com, MTV's website targeting college students, for one week. Its general retail and digital releases followed on August 30. "Soul Meets Body" represented the band's biggest radio hit at that time. "Crooked Teeth" began promotion that December. The album was a favorite among music directors for film and TV; virtually every song from Plans was synced.

Plans became the band's first top-10 album, peaking at number four on the Billboard 200 and moving 90,000 copies in its first sales week. Death Cab was one of the first indie rock bands to score a top five album in the U.S.; prior to this, only Bright Eyes' I'm Wide Awake, It's Morning had hit the top ten. In all, the set spent fifty weeks on the chart, never selling less than 1,000 copies in a week in the first three years of release. By 2008, it was certified platinum by the RIAA; it has logged 1.2 million copies domestically sold as of 2015. Prior to this, the band's entire Barsuk output had grossed 1.1 million combined.

== Critical reception ==
Professional ratings
Aggregate scores
Source	Rating
Metacritic	66/100
Review scores
Source	Rating
AllMusic	4.5/5 stars
Blender	3/5 stars
Entertainment Weekly	B+
The Guardian	3/5 stars
The Irish Times	4/5 stars
Los Angeles Times	3/4 stars
NME	4/10
Pitchfork	6.5/10
Q	3/5 stars
Rolling Stone	3/5 stars

Plans received generally positive reviews from music critics. At Metacritic, which assigns a normalized rating out of 100 to reviews from mainstream critics, the album received an average score of 66, indicating "generally favorable reviews". Jonah Bayer of Alternative Press stated that Plans "seamlessly picks up right where 2003's Transatlanticism left off" and praised its "cinematic" scope. The A.V. Club's Josh Modell wrote that the band "wears grandiosity with grace, miniaturizing and polishing big, broad moments into tiny triumphs that, like audible illusions, feel simultaneously intimate and huge." David Turnbull of musicOMH deemed Plans to be "an album of progression that is likely to win the band plenty of new fans, but it shouldn't alienate their fanbase either." Rhyannon Rodriguez, writing for Kludge, regarded the album as "a melodically mellow masterpiece" which expresses the "absolute epitome of this generation's pop." While stating that "at times, the writing feels almost too weightless", Ann Powers, writing in Blender, nonetheless contended that "repeat listening makes these songs reliably addictive."

In a mixed assessment, Betty Clarke of The Guardian felt that Plans was at times "unconvincing", but that when Gibbard "wrestles with big questions in smaller ways, he makes magic." While contending that Plans "doesn't differ radically from the previous four" Death Cab for Cutie albums, Q felt that Transatlanticism was a "more cohesive" effort. The NME wrote that the album was "produced within an inch of its shiny, whitebread life and the Cutie seem to have lost their faux-naive subtleties, becoming the non-thinking man's Coldplay along the way", while Uncut opined that the band's "failure to shift pace from a relentlessly wistful chug makes for an oddly exhausting listening experience." Nick Sylvester of The Village Voice wrote that "Death Cab succeed by refusing to offend", which "can be an admirable trait in a person, but never in a musician." In his Consumer Guide column for the same publication, Robert Christgau selected "I Will Follow You into the Dark" as a "choice cut", indicating a "good song on an album that isn't worth your time or money."

Reviewing the album for AllMusic, Rob Theakston declared that, "Plans is both a destination and a transitional journey for the group, one that sees the fulfillment of years of toiling away to develop their ideas and sound. But it's with the completion of those ideas that the band is faced with a new set of crossroads and challenges to tread upon: to stay the course and suffer stagnation or try something bold and daringly new with their future."

== Touring ==
The group began a North American headlining tour in support of Plans in October 2005 at the Commodore Ballroom in Vancouver. Youth Group and Stars were support acts on each leg of the trek. The tour wrapped in November 2005 at the Paramount Theatre in the band's Seattle hometown. The band also performed at several festivals, including domestic gigs at Summerfest in Milwaukee, Central Park Summerstage in New York and Austin City Limits in Texas, and the Summer Sonic Festival abroad in Japan. The band also staged a special benefit concert to aid victims of Hurricane Katrina at Seattle's Showbox venue.

The band chose to refrain from playing songs from Plans in advance of its release, with Harmer recalling to Billboard that they had previously exhausted songs from their third album, The Photo Album, prior to its debut. The band's 2006 tour grossed $5.9 million, with 31 out of 47 shows selling out according to Billboard Boxscore. During the Plans album cycle, the quartet also made their national television debuts with performances on Late Night with Conan O'Brien in September 2005, and on Saturday Night Live in January 2006.

On February 11, 2025, the band announced a 4-show U.S. tour for the 20th anniversary of Plans, with the album being played in full at each show. On behalf of the band, Gibbard stated that "[they] would be remiss to not take the opportunity to celebrate the 20th anniversary in some fashion."

== Legacy ==
Death Cab for Cutie was among the first indie acts to break through on a mainstream level, garnering consistent radio airplay and touring arenas in the aftermath of Plans. In the mid-2000s, the quartet became one of the biggest names in alternative rock.

All songs from Plans were adapted into short films, creating an anthology titled Directions. The project was developed by Harmer and Aaron Stewart-Ahn, a filmmaker from the production company Otaku-House. Each piece was helmed by a different director. The shorts debuted on Death Cab's website in January 2006.

== Track listing ==
No.	Title	Writer(s)	Length
1.	"Marching Bands of Manhattan"	Ben Gibbard	4:13
2.	"Soul Meets Body"	Gibbard	3:51
3.	"Summer Skin"	Gibbard, Jason McGerr, Chris Walla	3:14
4.	"Different Names for the Same Thing"	Gibbard	5:09
5.	"I Will Follow You into the Dark"	Gibbard	3:09
6.	"Your Heart Is an Empty Room"	Gibbard	3:39
7.	"Someday You Will Be Loved"	Gibbard, Walla	3:11
8.	"Crooked Teeth"	Gibbard, Walla	3:24
9.	"What Sarah Said"	Gibbard, Nick Harmer	6:21
10.	"Brothers on a Hotel Bed"	Gibbard, Walla	4:31
11.	"Stable Song"	Gibbard	3:42
Total length:			44:25

Vinyl bonus track
No.	Title	Writer(s)	Length
12.	"Talking Like Turnstiles"	Gibbard	2:28

Japanese bonus track
No.	Title	Writer(s)	Length
12.	"Jealousy Rides with Me"	Gibbard	2:25

iTunes Store bonus tracks
No.	Title	Writer(s)	Original artist	Length
12.	"Start Again"	Norman Blake	Teenage Fanclub	2:38
13.	"Bad Reputation" (pre-order bonus track)	Freedy Johnston	Freedy Johnston	4:16

== Personnel ==
=== Death Cab for Cutie ===
- Ben Gibbard – vocals, guitars, piano
- Nick Harmer – bass
- Jason McGerr – drums
- Chris Walla – guitars, keyboards, production

=== Production ===
- Produced, recorded and mixed by Christopher Walla
- Additional recording by Mike Lapierre, Kip Beelman, Robbie Skrocki, Beau Sorenson
- 'Crooked Teeth' mixed by Chris Shaw at Sound Track, New York, NY
- William Swan – Trumpet (on "Soul Meets Body")
- Sean Nelson – Harmonies (on "Crooked Teeth")
- Recorded in the barn at Longview Farm, North Brookfields, MA
- Additional recordings at Avast!, Seattle; Robert Lang Studios, Seattle; The Hall of Justice and Skrocki, Seattle
- Mixed at Smart Studios in Madison, WI
- Mastered by Roger Seibel at SAE Mastering in Phoenix, AZ
- Artwork and layout – Adde Russell

== Charts ==
=== Weekly charts ===
Weekly chart performance for Plans
Chart (2005–2006)	Peak position
Australian Albums (ARIA)	48
Canadian Albums (Nielsen SoundScan)	17
German Albums (Offizielle Top 100)	86
Scottish Albums (Official Charts)	80
Swedish Albums (Sverigetopplistan)	36
UK Albums (Official Charts)	104
US Billboard 200	4
US Indie Store Album Sales (Billboard)	7
US Top Rock Albums (Billboard)	9

=== Year-end charts ===
Year-end chart performance for Plans
Chart (2006)	Position
US Billboard 200	147

== Certifications ==
Certifications for Plans
Region	Certification	Certified units/sales
Canada (Music Canada)	Platinum	100,000^{‡}
United Kingdom (BPI)	Silver	60,000^{‡}
United States (RIAA)	Platinum	1,000,000^{^}
^{^} Shipments figures based on certification alone.^{‡} Sales+streaming figures based on certification alone.
