= Transatlanticism =

Studio album by Death Cab for Cutie
- Released: October 7, 2003
- Recorded: December 2002 – June 2003
- Studios: Hall of Justice, Seattle, Washington; Tiny Telephone, San Francisco, California
- Genres: Indie rock; art rock; post-punk revival; indie pop; alternative rock
- Length: 45:38
- Label: Barsuk
- Producer: Chris Walla

Death Cab for Cutie chronology
The Stability EP (2002)	Transatlanticism (2003)	Studio X Sessions EP (2004)

Singles from Transatlanticism
- 1. "The New Year" Released: February 16, 2004; 2. "The Sound of Settling" Released: August 23, 2004; 3. "Title and Registration" Released: 2005

Transatlanticism is the fourth studio album by rock band Death Cab for Cutie, released on October 7, 2003, by Barsuk Records. At this point in their career, the group had toured and recorded for nearly a half-decade. With tensions rising, the band decided to take time away from one another; notably, Ben Gibbard collaborated with electronic musician Dntel (Jimmy Tamborello), and released an album, Give Up, under the name the Postal Service. Death Cab regrouped in late 2002 to create Transatlanticism, which was recorded in a leisurely manner over five-day stretches until June 2003.

The record is a concept album, exploring a theme of long-distance romance. Gibbard penned the lyrics, which are somber and focus on the need to be loved. Musically, the album utilizes ambience and instrumental sparseness as an extension of this theme. The album's title, likewise, references the Atlantic Ocean and uses it as a metaphor for geographic and emotional separation. Chris Walla, the band's guitarist, produced the album as he had for its predecessors. The album's artwork was created by artist Adde Russell.

Prior to the album's release, Give Up had become a huge success, eventually going platinum—unusual territory for indie rock artists. The band were also referenced on the television drama The O.C., which increased their profile. Expectations for Transatlanticism were high, with the band receiving renewed attention. The album was a success: it charted at number 97 on the Billboard 200, and was certified Platinum by the Recording Industry Association of America (RIAA), for shipments of 1,000,000 copies in the United States. It received acclaim from music critics, who praised its emotional tone and expansive music. It is also the band's first album with drummer Jason McGerr.

== Background ==
Death Cab for Cutie formed in Bellingham, Washington, in 1997 by singer-songwriter Ben Gibbard, multi-instrumentalist Chris Walla, bassist Nick Harmer, and drummer Nathan Good. Gibbard had met Walla during their tenure at Western Washington University, and bonded over their taste in music. The quartet made their debut on the limited cassette release You Can Play These Songs with Chords. The following year, the group relocated to Seattle to pursue music in earnest. Their proper debut album, Something About Airplanes, was released on Seattle independent label Barsuk Records. They continued to build a following through relentless touring, and issued their second album, We Have the Facts and We're Voting Yes, in 2000. The group shifted their percussionists numerous times: Good was replaced by Jayson Tolzdorf-Larson, and then by Michael Schorr, with whom the band recorded their third LP, The Photo Album, released in 2001.

The Photo Album's creation was rushed for financial reasons. Each band member had recently left their day jobs, with the band now their primary source of income for the first time. They had also set a tour for later in the year, which led to a rushed, difficult recording process. Upon its release, The Photo Album represented the group's biggest success yet. It sold over 50,000 records at that time, which was unprecedented for an indie band. Despite this, relations between the band grew strained. The group had issues with Schorr, and Walla—who enjoyed recording music more than performing it—was feeling exhausted by the entire experience. It culminated in a tense fight at a tour stop in Baltimore in October 2001 where the band nearly broke up. After their touring commitments were complete, the band took a hiatus.

Gibbard moved to the Silver Lake neighborhood of Los Angeles, and began collaborating with electronic music artist Dntel (Jimmy Tamborello). The duo completed an album together, titled Give Up, which was issued on Sub Pop Records in February 2003. It became a bigger success than either had imagined, selling over 500,000 copies within its first two years of release, and over one million within the decade. Walla, meanwhile, continued to explore his interest in recording, producing albums by the Thermals and the Decemberists. By the time the band regrouped to work on their next album, tensions had cooled. Schorr had departed the band and was replaced by drummer Jason McGerr. His addition assisted in bringing stability to the band, as his calm demeanor helped settle the band's previous dynamic.

== Recording and production ==
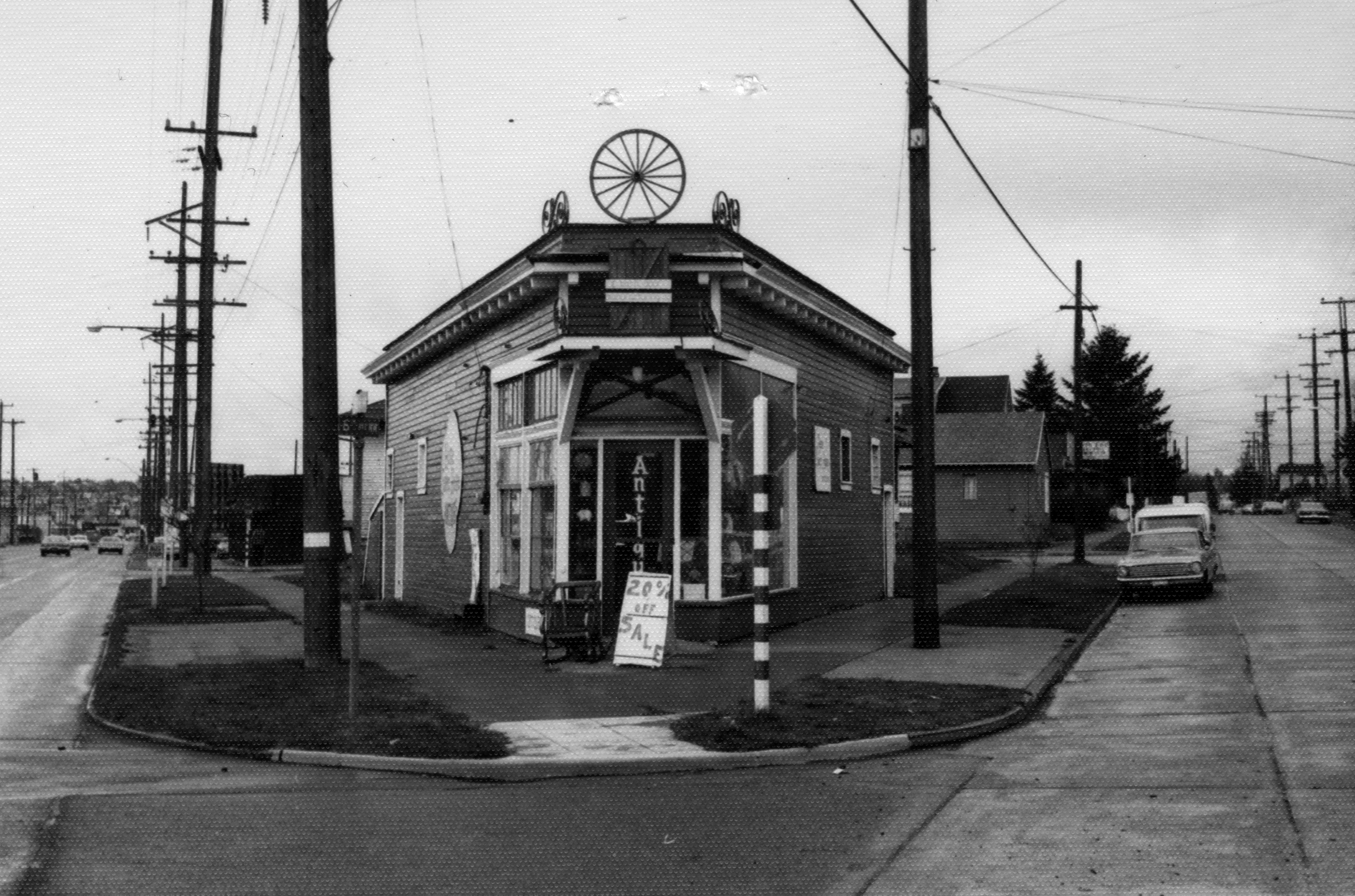
The Hall of Justice, the Seattle studio where Death Cab recorded Transatlanticism, as it looked in the 1970s.

Transatlanticism was recorded between December 2002 and June 2003. The album was mainly recorded at the Hall of Justice, a studio in Seattle's Fremont neighborhood that Walla purchased in 2000. A large portion of recording was also completed at Tiny Telephone Studios in San Francisco, where Walla worked as an engineer. He credited that studio as "the fifth member of the band", noting that its isolated location allowed him to "get locked in there in the most beautiful kind of way." The group made a conscious effort to spread out the recording process across months and studios, as they had had a poor experience recording its predecessor in a short time frame. Sessions at both studios were typically held over five day spans, with the band working leisurely and allowing themselves time to return to the recordings later for a fresh perspective.

In contrast to the negative atmosphere that produced its predecessor, the working environment for Transatlanticism was a kind and creative one. McGerr's joining the band refreshed their own commitment to the project, including Walla, who had at various times threatened to leave in the past. Gibbard considered it key that Walla was enjoying himself, and cited it as an integral piece to the album's success. To help spark inspiration during the recording process, the quartet utilized Oblique Strategies, a card-based method for promoting creativity jointly created by musician Brian Eno and painter Peter Schmidt, first published in 1975. As with previous Death Cab records, Transatlanticism was recorded entirely on analog tape, avoiding the convenience of digital technology. With the extra time taken in the studio, the fidelity of the album is of a considerably higher quality than previous efforts. The band recorded 12 songs, but left one incomplete at the time of its release.

Prior to the album's release, Gibbard stated: "...unlike The Photo Album, I feel like this record is definitely more like a proper album. We’ve tried to construct it with transitions of songs going in and out of each other, and I think it's a little bit more expansive than the last record."

== Composition ==
"Transatlanticism"
Sample from the song "Transatlanticism".

Throughout its eleven tracks, Transatlanticism is a sonic narrative exploring themes of isolation, sorrow, and long-distance romance. Lauren Viera at the Chicago Tribune categorized the album's contents as "earnest love songs and bittersweet ballads." Though many have suggested the album is a concept album, it was not conceived as such; Gibbard suggested that the ways in which songs are sonically stitched gave listeners the impression. When creating the LP, Gibbard felt "fascinated with the idea of geographic barriers as metaphors for personal, emotional barriers." The album's title is a word Gibbard created to reference the Atlantic Ocean's vast reach and its ability to separate individuals. Harmer looked up the word and discovered it indeed already existed, having been used in science journals. The inspiration for the album's title track came from Gibbard observing individuals saying goodbye to each another at Heathrow Airport, and knowing that they may not see one another for some time. "I had this fantastic idea of what if people were just able to transport themselves across the places or events that separated them," Gibbard told writer Andy Greenwald on the song's genesis.

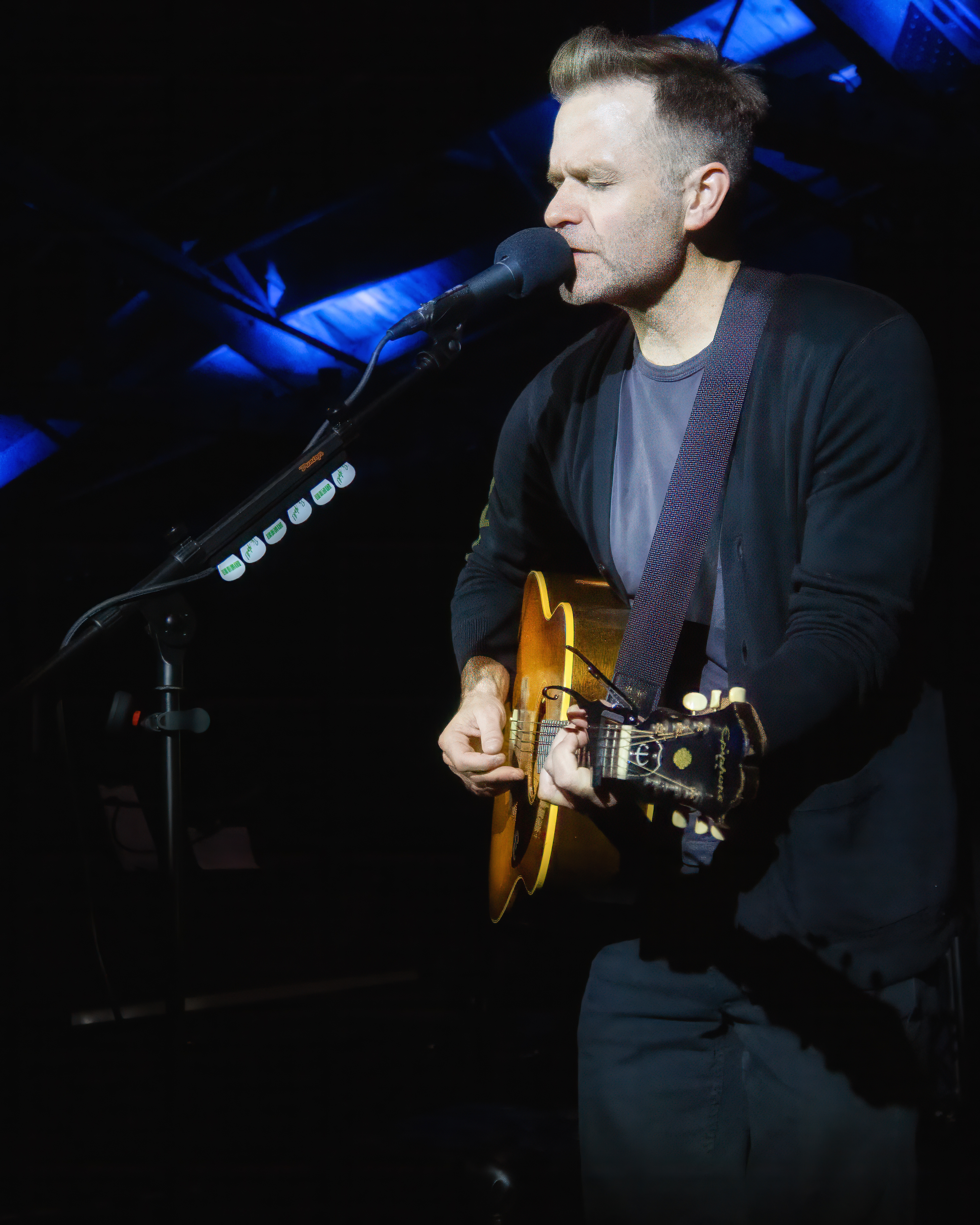
Ben Gibbard channeled his experiences—touring fatigue, romantic fallout, and quarter-life malaise—into the deeply personal songwriting of the LP.

Prior to creating the album, Gibbard felt increasingly exhausted with touring, and had a relationship fall apart because of being away for so long. These experiences comprised what Gibbard reflected on as the "lowest" year in his life, and influenced the songwriting on Transatlanticism profoundly. After this breakup, Gibbard floated from fling to fling—"that general mid-20s malaise," he said, which informed his lyricism. He began to focus more on songwriting as a career. He was aiming to complete one song per day, and for the album, he brought the band 25–30 demo tracks. Gibbard wrote the songs between August 2001 to the spring of 2003. Much of Gibbard's lyrics were composed during a "period of exile" when he was living in San Francisco, house-sitting for John Vanderslice, the artist and owner of Tiny Telephone Studios. Walla considered Gibbard's writing an improvement on past releases, later calling it "some of the most genuine and straightforward writing he's ever done, really open and unguarded in a way that was kind of new." His work with Tamborello informed his songwriting for Transatlanticism, with particular emphasis on redeveloping songs and deciding what to leave in or out. Gibbard would submit his songs to the band, who from there would take them and redevelop them. The musicians would take each song, break it back down to its melody and lyrics, and completely re-work the original arrangement if they felt it creatively necessary. "By asking for, and allowing more input from all of us, we could all help each other to explore new territory and take a few more risks," Harmer said.

Greenwald, writing for MTV, writes that the album's songs "slow dance between genres—lush, sensitive piano ballads bump up against and blur into kaleidoscopic guitar grooves." The album emphasizes ambient noises, including "clicks, whooshes, and whirs"; the title track, for example, is built around the humming of an airplane engine. Its mood is often somber or dark, which Gibbard figured was an extension of his point of view in life: "I have this sense of realism that sometimes is a little depressing," he confessed to Magnet in 2003. Jim Fusilli, writing for The Wall Street Journal, found the content on the album "often-gloomy, [but] yearning-for-optimism." Walla rejected the notion that the content on the album was bleak, noting that Gibbard's lyrics are mainly a "real simple expression of need and needing to be loved." Kelefa Sanneh, writing for The New York Times, observed that an extension of the album's long-distance theme lies in each song's reliance "upon a single, fragile-sounding melodic line—a skein of broken guitar chords, a reverberating piano."

=== Songs ===
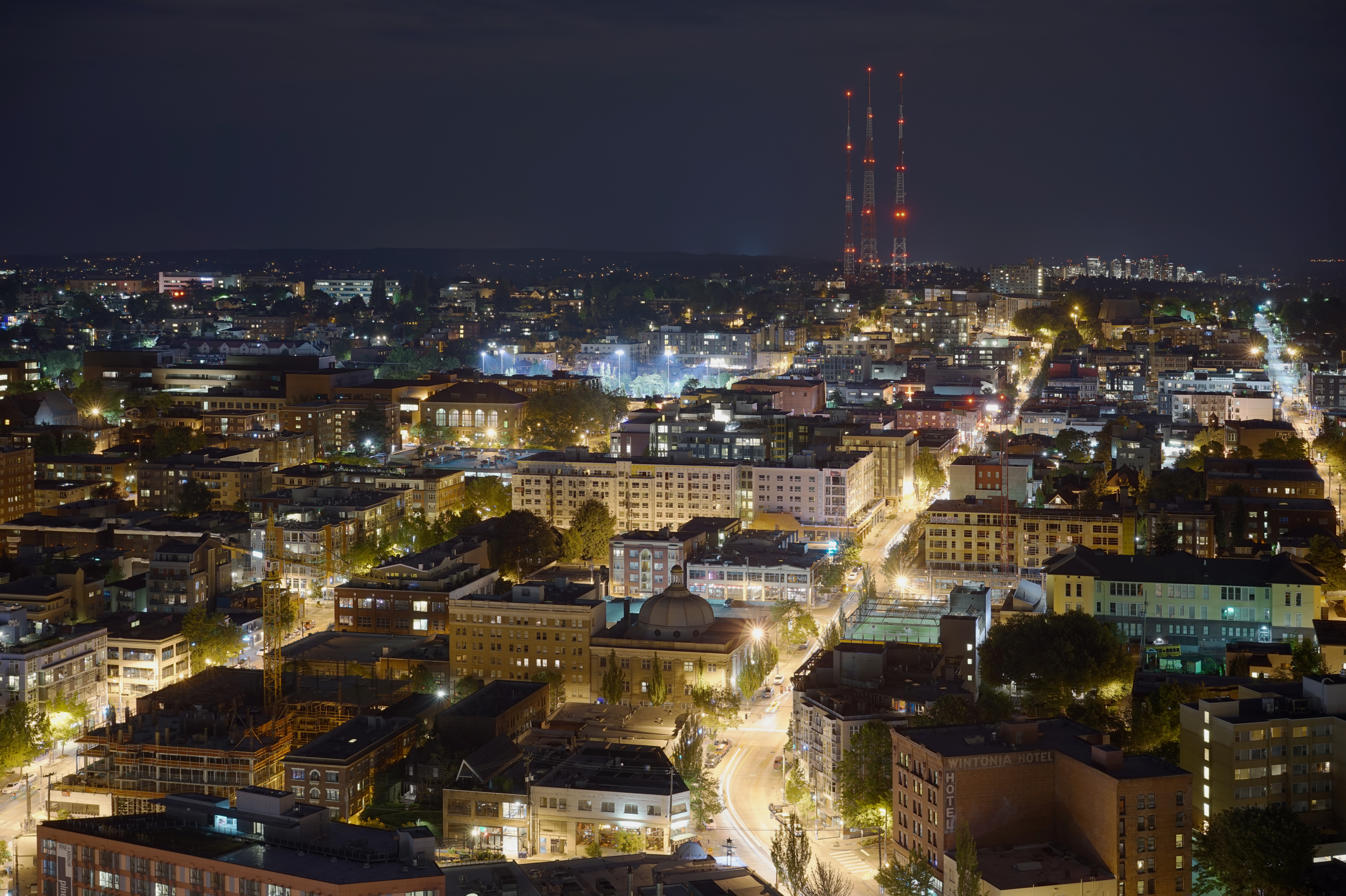
Transatlanticism is bookended by the distant rumble of a freeway at dusk, captured from an attic in Seattle's Capitol Hill, seen here.

Transatlanticism opens with the pulse of a distant freeway—a field recording of ambient noise—captured in the Seattle twilight. It segues into "The New Year," a song reflecting on a melancholic party on the final night of the year. Gibbard created the song's fictional protagonist by blending traits from several women he had encountered: “This song is about a person who came to me one day and said she wanted to be written about," he explained. The strange, looping noise in "Lightness" was achieved by modulating the pitch with a Leslie speaker, in tandem with an unintentional bleed between tracks on the physical master tape that gives it an eerie effect. The original version of "Title and Registration", available on its original CD single, is a markedly different iteration of the song. When mixing the album, Chris Walla felt dissatisfied with the song's upbeat tempo and tone in contrast with its suspenseful lyrics. He utilized a Lexicon Varispeech, a piece of hardware normally used in speech therapy, to crush the drum sounds into something more minimal, and he also slowed its tempo and altered its guitar and bass lines. "Expo 86" references the transportation fair, continuing the overarching ideas of travel and disconnection. Walla composed the song's bridge, which wasn't part of the original demo, believing it needed a break from its steadily mounting repetition. "Tiny Vessels", which centers on a casual and emotionless physical relationship—was written about a particular encounter, distinct from the themes explored in the rest of the album. Gibbard wrote "Tiny Vessels" about being so intoxicated by someone's physical beauty that one can overlook deeper incompatibilities. The same hollow bond fueled The Postal Service’s "Such Great Heights".

"Transatlanticism" serves as the album's centerpiece — the apex of its narrative of love, distance, and disconnection. For the track, the band used Weezer's "Only in Dreams" as a touchpoint when developing it. "Passenger Seat" was written two days after the 9/11 attacks, and its pastoral tone hearkens to a more innocent frame of mind in the wake of its chaos. “Death of an Interior Decorator” is a melancholic character study, inspired by Woody Allen’s 1978 drama Interiors. A brooding reflection on the impulsive lust of young love, "We Looked Like Giants" was the first song the band recorded for the LP. In the demo version of "Giants", the second verse was entirely different; Gibbard later scrapped it in favor of more atmospheric, imagery-rich lyrics like: "In a shroud of frost, the mountain air / began to pass / from every pane of weathered glass." In "A Lack of Color", the lyric "call at 7:03" subtly nods to the Washington, D.C. area code, a detail connected to Gibbard's previous romantic partner, who had relocated there. Afterwards, the album winds down to the familiar noise of city traffic, creating a perfect loop. Gibbard recorded the found sounds during the dead of night from his attic apartment in Capitol Hill. Rich Smith, writing for The Stranger, noted that the song reflects several of the album's themes: "longing and its 'endless distances,' as the West Coast poet Robert Hass would have it, and the paradise/prison of permanence we find in the notions of home and romantic relationships."

== Artwork ==
The album's artwork was created by Seattle-based painter Adde Russell. Russell knew Josh Rosenfeld, one of the founders of Barsuk Records, and McGerr had been her drum teacher. Rosenfeld asked the band if they would be interested in working with Russell, and they agreed. Russell began by producing a copious amount of artwork, in varying styles. "I had the expectation that either they'd find something in the mess that they liked or that the band would see how much work I'd done that they wouldn't have the heart to say no," she later remembered. The crow on the album cover was found by Russell in a hobby shop. Initially, it was a white styrofoam bird with red string. Harmer was particularly interested in this imagery, and continued her to keep working, and she eventually delivered the final album cover.

Eric Gansworth, writing for At Length magazine, describes the album's inner sleeve:

The striking image on the front cover, a soft-focus painting of a blackbird ensnared in some kind of blood-red string is simultaneously iconic and mysterious. The interior booklet reveals an abundance of representational painting, collage and assemblage, visually echoing the album's themes with repeated imagery of red ropy tangles (reminiscent of anatomical textbook illustrations of arteries), blown electrical fuses, a humming bird, rendered in "outsider art" fashion, a spectral human figure ambiguously situated in roiling water, narrowly cropped photos of train cars, and other repeated elements, some at the abstract end of the spectrum and others falling closer to graphic design. A figurative human hand, reminiscent of Adam's reaching out to God on Michelangelo's Sistine Chapel ceiling, is also tangled in red tendrils. Depending on how you hold the booklet, it either opens an expanse of several minimalist panel-spreads with superimposed lyrics, or is in sharp juxtaposition against the hummingbird, its needle-like bill replacing the hand of God.

== Release ==
Death Cab for Cutie first announced Transatlanticism on June 25, 2003, on Pitchfork. In the interim between albums, the group had licensed its songs for usage on the popular television drama The O.C., which helped introduce them to a wider audience. "A Lack of Color" was used on the show, and the band appeared as itself in an episode of the second season, performing "Title and Registration" and "The Sound of Settling" in the show's fictional music venue. This publicity, plus the wide success of Gibbard's other project, the Postal Service, led to considerably higher interest in Transatlanticism from the public. The album leaked online before its release; Gibbard called this a "good thing," noting, "if anything I like the idea of normal people getting a chance to hear it before it comes out."

Transatlanticism was released on October 7, 2003, by Barsuk Records. It was released physically on compact disc, double-LP vinyl, and cassette; additionally, the record saw digital distribution on the iTunes Store, which had debuted that year. In addition to regular formats, Barsuk also issued a limited release for audiophiles on SACD, the initial successor to CDs that purported to have higher audio quality and more storage. Walla extolled the possibilities of the format in a profile for CMJ at that time: "I think on a really subconscious level, [SACDs make] music more compelling to listen to," he said. Initial sales projections from the label were for first-week sales of between 6–8,000 copies. It debuted to over 15,000 copies sold, and became their first album to chart on Billboard 200 at number 97. It had sold over 100,000 copies by the following April, and by end of 2004, it had moved 225,000 copies. By 2007, the record had reached 530,000 copies sold, which music journalist Greg Kot judged was "a massive hit by indie-rock standards". On April 29, 2008, it was certified gold by the Recording Industry Association of America (RIAA).

In 2013, to celebrate the album's tenth anniversary, Barsuk reissued the LP on vinyl. The label also released Transatlanticism Demos, a collection of demo versions of songs from Transatlanticism.

== Touring ==
The band regrouped to rehearse for the tour behind Transatlanticism in late 2003. In contrast to their previous live setups, which were simpler and more focused on the four instruments, the band made it a priority to include samplers to incorporate the soundscapes present on Transatlanticism. Previously, the quartet had driven themselves from city to city in an Econoline van. For this tour, their accommodations were upgraded: they paid for a tour bus for the first time. Gibbard justified the expense in an interview with CMJ: "All of us are past this Catholic-style indie-rock guilt about taking a bus. No, dude, taking a bus is rad." They toured throughout late 2003 alongside Nada Surf, The Long Winters, and Mates of State. It was the band's first tour with only one supporting act per show. Their rationale was that as their catalog had grown, it felt more reasonable to play longer shows. In early 2004, they again toured the U.S., co-headlining with Ben Kweller and Pedro the Lion.

Its touring commitments for Transatlanticism included spots at the 2004 Coachella Festival in Indio, California, New York's Siren Festival, Q101's "Block Party" in Chicago, and the "Bite of Portland" festival, a fundraiser for the Special Olympics Oregon. Pearl Jam invited the band to open for them on their 2004 Vote for Change tour, and the band concluded the year with another headlining tour across the U.S., between October and November 2004. They were originally set to open for pop punk group Blink-182 that December, but the band had to cancel as Gibbard developed a benign cyst on his leg that required surgery and a rest period. All of the touring for Transatlanticism took place Stateside; touring overseas was complicated for the band, as their record label contracts were split between nine different companies there. These issues and the band's rising stardom led them to court major-labels in 2004. The band's touring behind Transatlanticism is documented in the film Drive Well, Sleep Carefully by director Justin Mitchell.

== Reception ==
Professional ratings
Aggregate scores
Source	Rating
Metacritic	85/100
Review scores
Source	Rating
AllMusic	5/5 stars
The Baltimore Sun	3.5/4 stars
Blender	3/5 stars
Chicago Sun-Times	3.5/4 stars
Mojo	3/5 stars
Pitchfork	6.4/10 (2003); 8.4/10 (2013)
Rolling Stone	3.5/5 stars
Slant Magazine	4/5 stars
Spin	A−
Uncut	4/5 stars

Transatlanticism was met with widespread critical acclaim. At Metacritic, which assigns a normalized rating out of 100 to reviews from mainstream publications, the album received an average score of 85, based on 21 reviews. Uncut magazine hailed it as "a record of rare beauty and poise", and Alternative Press deemed it "Death Cab's slowest and most mature recording" with "hidden bits of magic [that] reveal themselves brilliantly." Andy Greenwald from Spin found the imagery of the lyrics strikingly vivid while praising Gibbard and Walla's musical direction. Rob Theakston of AllMusic wrote that Transatlanticism is "such a decadently good listen from start to finish" because of the band's maturity as songwriters and musicians.

In The A.V. Club, Stephen Thompson said the record "surpasses Gibbard's other career highpoints", calling it "a lush, impeccably produced, musically adventurous, emotionally resonant examination of the way relationships are both strengthened and damaged by distance". PopMatters critic Christine Klunk said it was a "nearly perfect pop record" whose straightforward melodies and honest narratives extolled the human condition. William Morris from Pitchfork was more critical, lamenting what he felt were Gibbard's more generalized lyrics and less edge to the band's "usually acute divinations". Stylus Magazine's Colin McElligatt said despite his strong melodies, he had regressed as a lyricist and sounded more "asinine" than before. In The Village Voice, Robert Christgau cited "We Looked Like Giants" as a "choice cut", indicating "a good song on an album that isn't worth your time or money".

In 2011, Transatlanticism was named by NPR Music as one of the fifty most important recordings of the 2000s decade, while Rolling Stone ranked it 57th on the magazine's decade-end list. In 2013, Death Cab for Cutie re-released the album, marking its 10th anniversary with a remaster available as vinyl or MP3 download, including demos for all the songs from the album. In a retrospective piece that year, Entertainment Weekly's Kyle Anderson called Transatlanticism a "classic indie-rock album", while Pitchfork editor Ian Cohen wrote, "few records open themselves up to forge those kind of moments, to be a formative emotional and listening experience, pushing you to feel what you're thinking (to flip a line from 'Lightness'), daring to be universal enough to allow you to see yourself in it."

== Legacy ==
Transatlanticism was released at a moment where indie rock became a cultural force, gaining popularity outside its typical fanbases. Death Cab, like the Shins, Modest Mouse, and Interpol, saw increased popularity and record sales. The album also became a crossover hit for emo fans. In a cover story for Spin at that time, writer Andy Greenwald suggested that "Death Cab have found a way to communicate intimate, insular indie rock to the budding teen-emo overground". The group rejected their association with emo music, turning down an offer to tour with Dashboard Confessional, to whom they were frequently compared.

The band sparked a major-label bidding war, with A&R representatives viewing them as America's answer to the band Coldplay. Interscope's Jimmy Iovine vied to sign both the Postal Service and Death Cab, reportedly exclaiming, "Why would I only want the one that doesn't sell as much as the other one?" Gibbard viewed the band's increasing profile excitedly: "We're over being an indie rock band. We're proud of what we've accomplished, but it's far more exciting to me to reach an audience that stretches beyond any genre or age group." By November 2004, the group had left Barsuk and signed a worldwide, long-term deal with major label Atlantic Records. The process to sign the band was a difficult, year-long affair; Atlantic had to buy out the rest of the quartet's Barsuk contract and pay that label for the remaining two albums it owed them.

Gibbard has since ranked Transatlanticism as his favorite album by the band, remarking that with both the release of Give Up and Transatlanticism, "I’ve never had a more creatively inspired year."

== Track listing ==
All lyrics written by Ben Gibbard.

No.	Title	Music	Length
1.	"The New Year"	Ben Gibbard, Nick Harmer, Jason McGerr, Chris Walla	4:06
2.	"Lightness"	Gibbard	3:30
3.	"Title and Registration"	Gibbard, Walla	3:39
4.	"Expo '86"	Gibbard, Walla	4:11
5.	"The Sound of Settling"	Gibbard	2:12
6.	"Tiny Vessels"	Gibbard, Harmer	4:21
7.	"Transatlanticism"	Gibbard, Walla	7:55
8.	"Passenger Seat"	Gibbard	3:41
9.	"Death of an Interior Decorator"	Gibbard	2:56
10.	"We Looked Like Giants"	Gibbard, Harmer, McGerr, Walla	5:32
11.	"A Lack of Color"	Gibbard	3:35

2013 reissue bonus vinyl LP/MP3 download
No.	Title	Music	Length
1.	"The New Year (Demo)"	Gibbard, Harmer, McGerr, Walla	3:17
2.	"Lightness (Demo)"	Gibbard	4:24
3.	"Title and Registration (Demo)"	Gibbard, Walla	3:42
4.	"Expo '86 (Demo)"	Gibbard, Walla	5:00
5.	"The Sound of Settling (Demo)"	Gibbard	2:36
6.	"Tiny Vessels (Demo)"	Gibbard, Harmer	4:55
7.	"Transatlanticism (Demo)"	Gibbard, Walla	6:13
8.	"Passenger Seat (Demo)"	Gibbard	3:19
9.	"Death of An Interior Decorator (Demo)"	Gibbard	3:11
10.	"We Looked Like Giants (Demo)"	Gibbard, Harmer, McGerr, Walla	3:52
11.	"A Lack of Color (Demo)"	Gibbard	3:24

== Personnel ==
Death Cab for Cutie

- Benjamin Gibbard – vocals, guitar, piano, foot-stomp and hand clap effects on "The Sound of Settling"
- Nick Harmer – bass guitar, vocals on "Transatlanticism", foot-stomp and hand clap effects on "The Sound of Settling"
- Jason McGerr – drums, percussion, foot-stomp and hand clap effects on "The Sound of Settling"
- Christopher Walla – guitar, keyboards, samples, production, mixing (except “Expo 86” and "The Sound of Settling"), recording, vocals on "Transatlanticism"

Additional personnel

- Ed Brooks – mastering
- John Goodmanson – mixing on “Expo 86” and "The Sound of Settling"
- Rob Herbst – foot-stomp and hand clap effects on "The Sound of Settling"
- Sean Nelson – vocals on "Transatlanticism"
- John Roderick – vocals on "Transatlanticism"
- Phil Wandscher – vocals on "Transatlanticism"

== Charts ==
Chart (2003–04)	Peak position
US Billboard 200	97
US Independent Albums (Billboard)	8

== Certifications ==
Region	Certification	Certified units/sales
Canada (Music Canada)	Gold	50,000^{‡}
United States (RIAA)	Platinum	1,000,000^{‡}
^{‡} Sales+streaming figures based on certification alone.
