= Chris Walla =

American musician (born 1975)

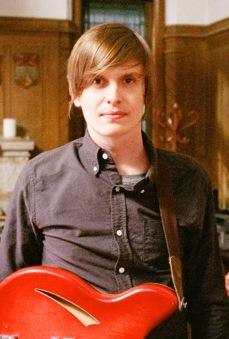
- Walla in 2014

Background information
- Born: Christopher Ryan Walla; November 2, 1975 (age 50); Bothell, Washington, United States
- Genre: Indie rock
- Occupations: Singer-songwriter, guitarist, record producer, film score composer
- Instruments: Guitar, vocals, piano, keyboards, samples, bass, audio sequencer
- Years active: 1994–present
- Labels: Barsuk; Atlantic; Elsinor
- Formerly of: Death Cab for Cutie

Christopher Ryan Walla (born November 2, 1975) is an American musician, record producer, and film music composer, best known for being a former guitarist and songwriter for the band Death Cab for Cutie.

== Musical career ==
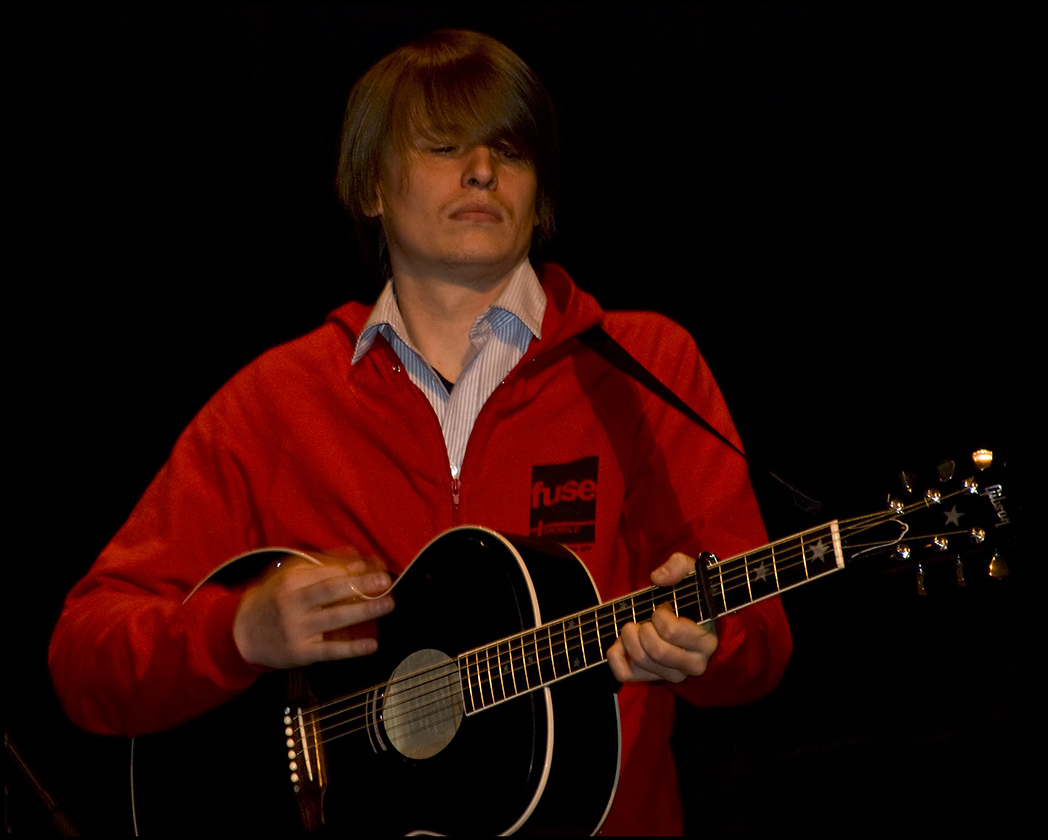
Walla playing guitar

=== Early bands ===
While at Bothell High School in the early 1990s, Walla started a program called Open Microphone with creative writing teacher Laura Drumheller, as a noon-time forum for the arts, which allowed any student to take the stage and perform. Walla regularly performed at these shows, as well as serving as MC. One performance by Walla included a song by Talking Heads. These early Open Microphone shows proved popular and continued for over twenty years, moving from Bothell High School to Inglemoor High School when teacher Drumheller transferred there.

Walla was in a short-lived band called The Wallflowers (not to be confused with The Wallflowers of California).

Later in 2001, after having joined Death Cab for Cutie, he was an early member of the Seattle band The Long Winters.

=== Death Cab for Cutie ===
Walla joined Death Cab for Cutie in 1997, after moving to Bellingham, Washington where guitarist/singer Ben Gibbard and bassist Nick Harmer were attending Western Washington University. Eventually releasing seven albums, four EPs and two live EPs with the band, Walla co-wrote many of their hit songs, including "Title and Registration" and "I Will Possess Your Heart".

On August 13, 2014, after 17 years with Death Cab for Cutie, Chris Walla decided to part ways with the band, stating that he plans to "continue making music, producing records, and erring on the side of benevolence and beauty whenever possible." Walla's last performance with the band occurred on September 13, 2014, at the Rifflandia Music Festival in Victoria, British Columbia.

In a 2015 interview, Walla explained that he left the band because he found himself uninterested in the music they were working on for the band's eighth studio album, Kintsugi. He critiqued the songs as "flat," none of his ideas seemed to be sticking, and he felt the band needed an infusion of fresh blood; "I was really dissatisfied with where the Death Cab stuff had gotten to when I quit as producer, and that’s why I quit."

=== Solo projects ===
Walla has recorded a variety of solo material and released his debut solo album, Field Manual, in 2008 on Barsuk Records. The song "Sing Again" became available for free download from Barsuk's website. Before the release of Field Manual, it was reported that two tracks recorded for Death Cab for Cutie's 2005 album, Plans, would be featured, but this is unconfirmed. Some of Walla's solo work has been released using the name Martin Youth Auxiliary, such as a cassette released in 1999 on Elsinor Records.

A solo instrumental album, titled Tape Loops, was released on October 16, 2015.

On October 6, 2023, Walla released the EP 2002 on Bandcamp, consisting of three previously unreleased songs written and recorded by him in the year 2002.

=== Production ===
In addition to being a musician, Walla has a long career as a producer, earning production, engineering, and mixing credits on over thirty albums and EPs. His first credit was as the producer for Death Cab for Cutie's debut album, Something About Airplanes, released in 1998. Walla produced all releases by Death Cab for Cutie until Kintsugi except 1997's You Can Play These Songs with Chords EP, which was produced by Ben Gibbard. However, Walla earned production credits on the 2002 re-release of You Can Play These Songs with Chords, which featured 10 new songs. It was announced via Kelly Porter's Facebook Page Walla would be doing guitar work for her upcoming recording work.

== Studios ==
Walla founded his own recording studio, located within his home in Portland, Oregon, named the Alberta Court. Prior to moving to Portland, from 2000 to 2005, he was the owner/proprietor of Seattle recording studio, the Hall of Justice, where Death Cab for Cutie and many Pacific Northwest bands recorded over the years. In 2012, Walla began rebuilding the Hall of Justice after moving back to Seattle.

== Personal life ==
Walla married scholar, knitwear designer, and illustrator Dianna Potter in February 2013, at the Swedish Cultural Center in Seattle. Since leaving the band, Walla and his wife moved to Montreal, Quebec before later settling in Trondheim, Norway.

== Discography ==
Selected credits

- Josaleigh Pollett, "Bed of Quiet" (2026) - Samples
- Petey USA, The Yips (2025) - Producer
- Snarls, With Love, (2024) - Producer
- Ratboys, The Window (2023) - Producer, mixer
- Pinegrove, 11:11 (2022) – Mixer
- Braids, Shadow Offering (2020) – Producer
- Mike Edel, Thresholds (2019) - Producer
- Foxing, Nearer My God (2018) – Producer
- Lo Moon, Lo Moon (2018) – Producer
- Gotch, Good New Times (2016) – Co-producer
- Death Cab for Cutie, Kintsugi (2015) – Writer
- Rocky Votolato, Hospital Handshakes (2015) – Producer, engineer, mixer
- Fences, Lesser Oceans (2015) – Producer, engineer, writer, programming
- William Fitzsimmons, Lions (2014) – Producer, engineer, mixer, writer
- The Lonely Forest, Adding Up the Wasted Hours (2013) – Engineer, mixer
- Death Cab for Cutie, Codes and Keys (2011) – Producer, engineer, mixer, writer
- Telekinesis, 12 Desperate Straight Lines (2011) – Engineer, mixer, writer
- The Lonely Forest, Arrows (2011) – Producer, engineer, mixer
- Ra Ra Riot, The Orchard (2010) – Mixer
- Someone Still Loves You Boris Yeltsin, Let It Sway (2010) – Co-producer, engineer
- The Thermals, Personal Life (2010) – Producer, engineer, mixer
- Gordon Downie, The Grand Bounce (2010) – Producer, engineer, mixer
- Death Cab for Cutie, The Twilight Saga: New Moon (soundtrack) (2009) – Producer, engineer, mixer, writer
- Death Cab for Cutie, The Open Door EP (2009) – Producer, engineer, mixer, writer
- Tegan and Sara, Sainthood (2009) – Co-producer, engineer
- Telekinesis, Telekinesis! (2009) – Producer, engineer, mixer
- So Many Dynamos, The Loud Wars (2009) – Producer, engineer, mixer
- Death Cab for Cutie, Narrow Stairs (2008) – Producer, engineer, mixer, writer
- Mates of State, Re-Arrange Us (2008) – Producer, engineer, loops
- Youth Group, The Night Is Ours (2008) – Guitar, vocals (background), mixer
- Nada Surf, Lucky (2008) – Engineer
- Chris Walla, Field Manual (2008) – Producer, engineer, mixer, writer
- Tegan and Sara, The Con (2007) – Producer, engineer, mixer
- The Decemberists, The Crane Wife (2006) – Producer, engineer, mixer
- Death Cab for Cutie, Plans (2005) – Producer, engineer, Mixer, writer
- Youth Group, Casino Twilight Dogs (2005) – Mixer
- Youth Group, Forever Young (2005) – Mixer
- Nada Surf, The Weight Is a Gift (2005) – Producer, engineer
- The Decemberists, Picaresque (2005) – Producer, engineer, mixer
- The Decemberists, The Tain (2005) – Producer, engineer, mixer
- The Thermals, Fuckin A (2004) – Producer, engineer, mixer
- Death Cab for Cutie, Transatlanticism (2003) – Producer, engineer, mixer, writer
- The Long Winters, When I Pretend to Fall (2003) – Producer, engineer, mixer
- The Postal Service, Give Up (2003) – Engineer, piano, drums, vocals
- The Stratford 4, Love & Distortion (2003) – Producer, engineer, mixer
- The Thermals, More Parts per Million (2003) – Mixer
- Rocky Votolato, Suicide Medicine (2003) – Producer, engineer, mixer
- Rocky Votolato, Light and Sound EP (2003) – Producer, engineer, mixer
- Death Cab for Cutie, The Stability EP (2002) – Producer, engineer, mixer, writer
- Death Cab for Cutie, You Can Play These Songs with Chords (2002) – Producer, engineer, mixer, writer
- David Cross, Shut Up You Fucking Baby! (2002) – Engineer
- Carissa's Wierd, Songs About Leaving (2002) – Engineer, mixer
- Hot Hot Heat, Knock Knock Knock (EP) (2002) – Producer, engineer
- Hot Hot Heat, Make Up The Breakdown (2002) – Additional recording, mixer
- The Long Winters, The Worst You Can Do Is Harm (2002) – Producer, engineer, mixer
- Nada Surf, Let Go (2002) – Engineer, mixer
- The Velvet Teen, Out of the Fierce Parade (2002) – Producer, engineer
- Death Cab for Cutie, The Photo Album (2001) – Producer, engineer, mixer, writer
- Death Cab for Cutie, The Forbidden Love EP (2000) – Producer, engineer, mixer, writer
- Death Cab for Cutie, We Have the Facts and We're Voting Yes (2000) – Producer, engineer, mixer, writer
- Death Cab for Cutie, Something About Airplanes (1998) – Producer, engineer, mixer, writer
