= Ben Gibbard =

American musician (born 1976)

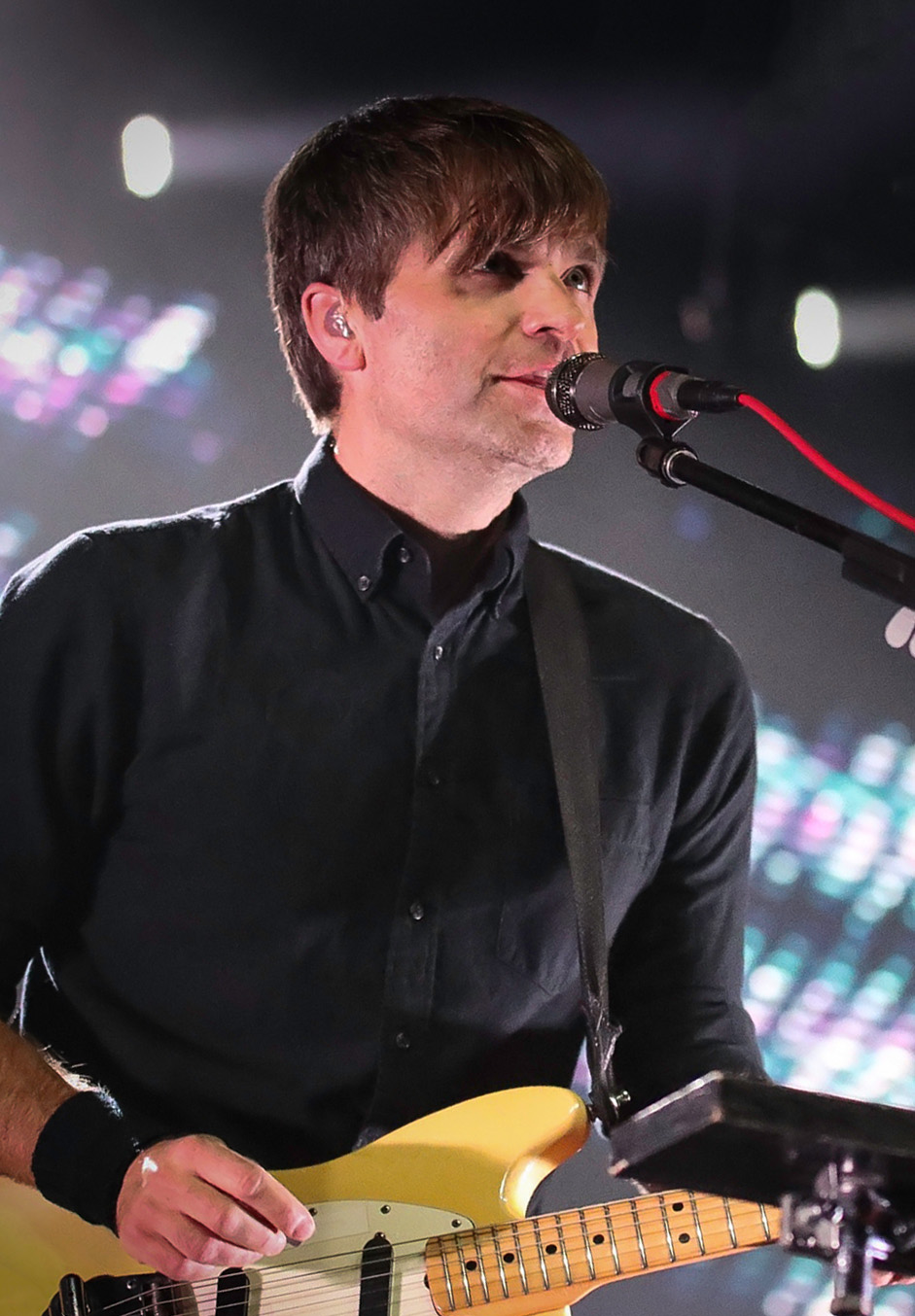
- Gibbard with Death Cab for Cutie in 2018

Background information
- Born: Benjamin Gibbard; August 11, 1976 (age 50); Bremerton, Washington, U.S.
- Genres: Alternative rock; indie rock; synth-pop; emo
- Occupations: Singer; songwriter; guitarist
- Instruments: Vocals; guitar; piano; drums; bass
- Years active: 1994–present
- Labels: Barsuk; Atlantic; Sub Pop; Anti-; Wawa; Lakeshore Records; Turntable Kitchen
- Member of: Death Cab for Cutie; The Postal Service
- Spouse: Zooey Deschanel (m. 2009; div. 2012) Rachel Demy (m. 2016; div. 2024)
- Website: benjamingibbard.com

Benjamin Gibbard (born August 11, 1976) is an American musician. He is best known as the lead vocalist and guitarist of the indie rock band Death Cab for Cutie, with whom he has recorded eleven studio albums, and as a member of the indie pop supergroup The Postal Service. Gibbard has also released a solo album, Former Lives (2012), and a collaborative studio album, One Fast Move or I'm Gone (2009), with Jay Farrar.

== Early life ==
Benjamin Gibbard was born to Margaret (née Flach) and Allen Gibbard in Bremerton, Washington on August 11, 1976. His father was in the Navy and his family moved around the country, including spending time in Northern Virginia, before returning to Washington. Gibbard's father, though not a trained musician, introduced him to records by AC/DC, Devo, Ramones, the Beatles, and the Beach Boys, spurring his interest in music. Gibbard was a competitive swimmer from the age of eight until his junior year of high school, and also played baseball, but eventually gave them up in favor of music. He was raised Catholic.

Gibbard was introduced to indie music through the older siblings of friends. As a teenager living in Herndon, Virginia, he taped songs off of the local radio station WHFS, since he could not afford records. Gibbard returned to Bremerton during the grunge music explosion of the early 1990s, and frequently attended shows at the all-ages OK Hotel in Seattle. He formed a band in high school named Oddfellows Local 1046, and played his first-ever show opening for the Gits, whose singer Mia Zapata was murdered about a year later.

Gibbard graduated from Olympic High School in Bremerton in 1994. He moved to Bellingham to study environmental chemistry at Western Washington University, which was not a subject that interested him; his parents only agreed to fund his college education if he studied something "marketable".

== Career ==
In 1996, while playing guitar in the band Pinwheel, Gibbard recorded a demo cassette as Death Cab for Cutie, titled You Can Play These Songs with Chords (1997). After receiving a positive response to the material, Gibbard decided to expand the project into a full band. He met guitarist Chris Walla through a mutual friend, and also recruited bassist Nick Harmer, whom he had played drums with in a different band. Walla brought in his friend Nathan Good to play drums.

The following year, the band released its debut album, Something About Airplanes (1998), on Barsuk Records, and released its follow-up, We Have the Facts and We're Voting Yes, in 2000. During this time, he and Harmer supported themselves financially by working in shipping and receiving at the warehouse of a Seattle-based nonprofit. The band saw a breakthrough with their fourth album, Transatlanticism (2003). Plans (2005) was the band's first album with Atlantic Records, a major label.

In February 2003, Gibbard and Jimmy Tamborello released Give Up, the Postal Service's sole studio album. It went on to become Sub Pop's second-best selling record after Nirvana's Bleach. Rilo Kiley singer Jenny Lewis provided backup vocals for the cult-favorite album.

Gibbard had a minor role in the John Krasinski film Brief Interviews with Hideous Men, based on the David Foster Wallace short story collection of the same title. He completed a solo tour through the US in the spring of 2007 that featured David Bazan of Pedro the Lion and singer-songwriter Johnathan Rice.

In November 2014, Gibbard appeared as a guest on Foo Fighters' eighth studio album, Sonic Highways.

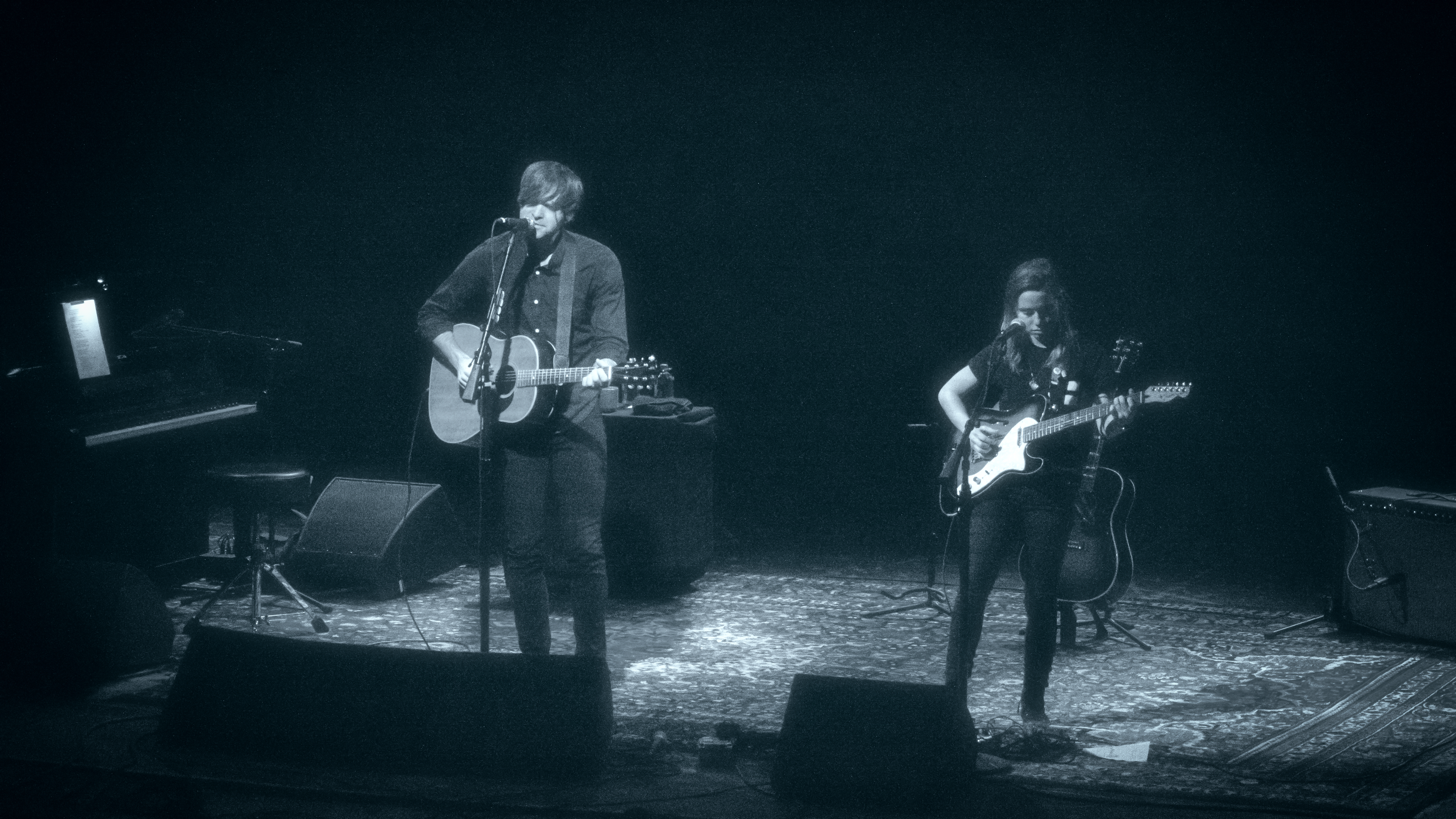
Gibbard (left) performing alongside Julien Baker

== Personal life ==
Gibbard became engaged to actress and musician Zooey Deschanel in 2008 and they married in September 2009 near Seattle. They announced their separation on November 1, 2011, with Deschanel filing for divorce on December 27, citing irreconcilable differences. The divorce was finalized on December 12, 2012. Gibbard later married photographer and tour manager Rachel Demy on October 21, 2016, in Seattle. The couple separated in 2023 and later divorced.

In a 2003 interview, Gibbard stated that while he was previously a vegan, he recently became a pescetarian. He reportedly quit alcohol in 2008 and began running marathons. He ran his first trail ultramarathon in 2013 and has since completed several each year. On June 2, 2025, he completed the 100-mile Western States Endurance Run.

Gibbard is a lapsed Catholic who now identifies as agnostic: "I don't want to falsely believe in something solely so I can jump to the front of the line for whatever this awesome place is we go after we die. [...] The vastness of that idea is so beyond my comprehension that I feel like if there was a God, then that God would accept me saying I'm not able to believe because it's so outside of my ability to understand it. I understand that's where faith comes into play."

Gibbard has been a fan of the MLB's Seattle Mariners since the age of five and has thrown the first pitch at two Mariners games. When the Mariners traded Ichiro Suzuki to the New York Yankees in 2012, Gibbard honored him by writing and releasing the song "Ichiro's Theme". Gibbard's handwritten lyrics for the song are archived at the National Baseball Hall of Fame and Museum in Cooperstown, New York. In 2024, Gibbard performed the national anthem at the Mariners' Opening Day game at T-Mobile Park.

== Politics ==
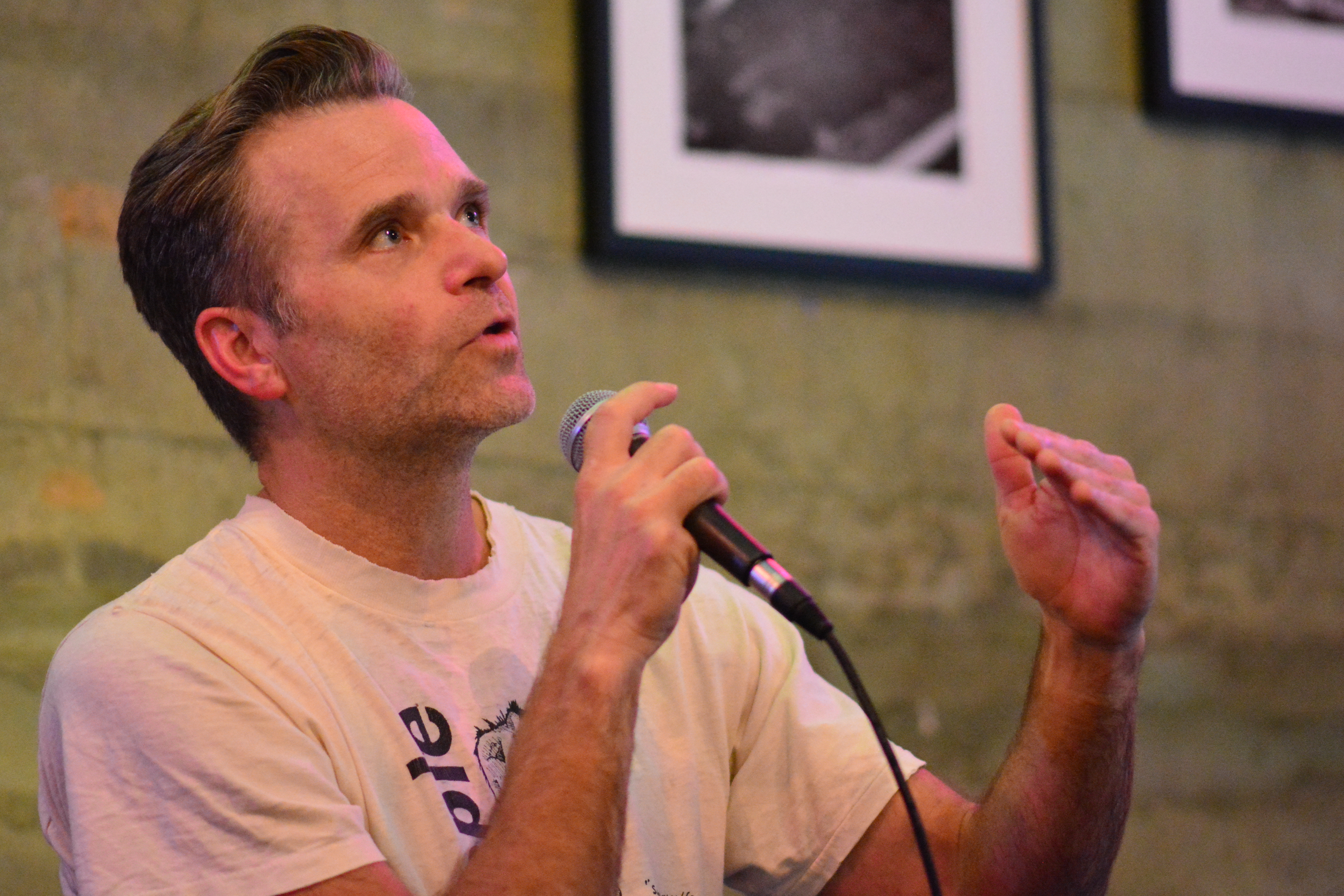
Gibbard in 2024, discussing Seattle's one-time Teen Dance Ordinance and its effect on him in his teens.

Gibbard is an activist for LGBTQ+ rights. He has voiced his support for the Washington Referendum 74 and discussed raising money for the issue. He stated, "I would just feel so much pride for my state if we could pass it by a popular vote and show the rest of the country that this is the direction we are going in."

Gibbard has been open about his political views, expressing his support of the Democratic Party. On October 10, 2016, Death Cab for Cutie released "Million Dollar Loan", the first song in the Dave Eggers project, 30 Days, 50 Songs. The song targeted Donald Trump as it satirized the fact he asked his father for a million dollar loan. Gibbard said of the song: "Lyrically, 'Million Dollar Loan' deals with a particularly tone deaf moment in Donald Trump's ascent to the Republican nomination. While campaigning in New Hampshire last year, he attempted to cast himself as a self-made man by claiming he built his fortune with just a 'small loan of a million dollars' from his father. Not only has this statement been proven to be wildly untrue, he was so flippant about it. It truly disgusted me."

During the COVID-19 pandemic, Gibbard live streamed daily concerts from his home after canceling shows due to the pandemic. Gibbard played songs by his bands Death Cab for Cutie and The Postal Service and other artists such as The Decemberists, Radiohead, New Order, Depeche Mode and The Beatles while promoting local Washington non-profit organizations.

== Musical equipment ==
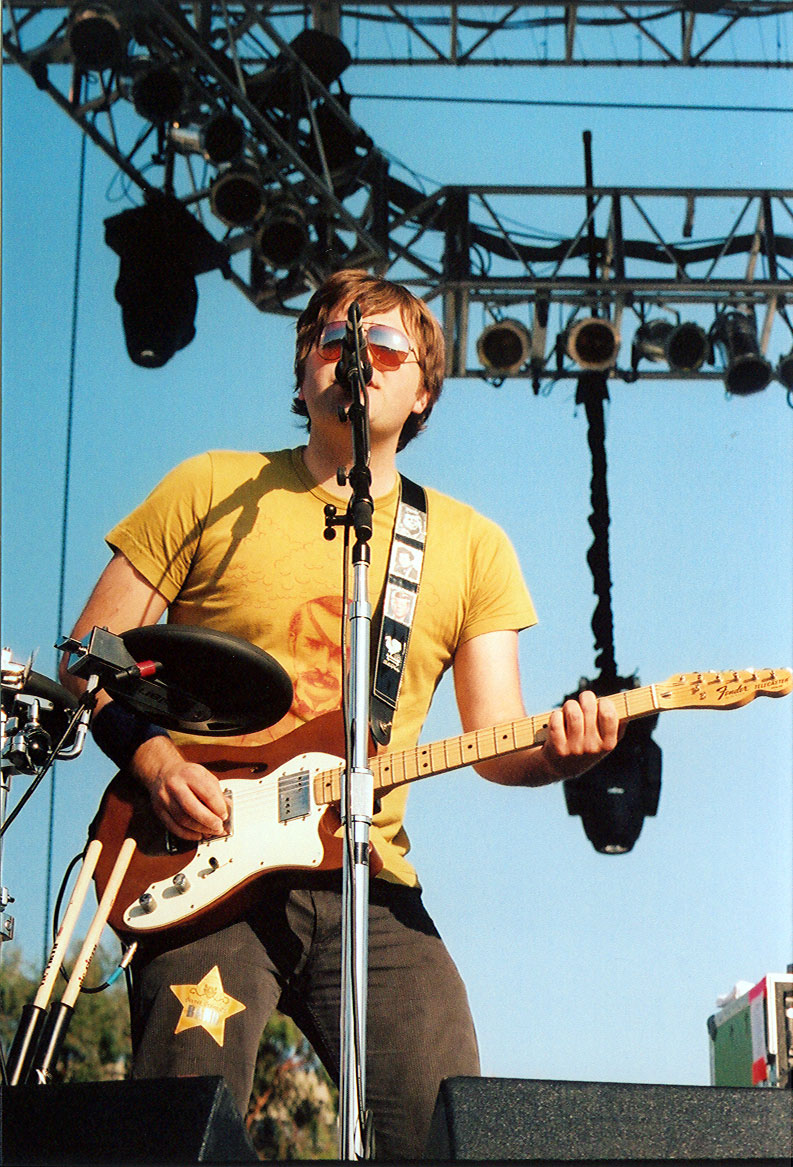
Gibbard performing with Death Cab for Cutie in 2005

As of May 2015, Gibbard tours with four modified 1970s Fender Mustang guitars. Additionally, he uses two custom-built Acme Silvertone amplifier heads. For acoustic songs, he relies on two 2008 Gibson J-45 Acoustic Guitars with B-Band pickup systems. Since 2016, Gibbard has begun using Supro amplifiers. In the past, Gibbard played 1980s Japanese-built Squier Bullets through a Sears Silvertone amp, which he immortalized in the lyrics to the song "No Joy In Mudville". He also used Fender Telecasters and G&L ASAT guitars.

In January 2021, Fender announced the Ben Gibbard Mustang as part of their Artist Signature series, designed to Ben's specifications and inspired by the 1970s Mustangs he uses on tour. The guitar boasts several unique features including a chambered ash body, custom Ben Gibbard Mustang pickups, and simplified electronics.

== In popular culture ==
Gibbard is the subject of the song "Ben's My Friend" by indie folk act Sun Kil Moon. The track appears on the project's sixth studio album, Benji (2014). On Sun Kil Moon's follow-up album, Universal Themes (2015), primary recording artist Mark Kozelek again refers to his friendship with Gibbard on its closing track, "This Is My First Day and I'm Indian and I Work at a Gas Station". Gibbard previously made a guest appearance on the band's third studio album, April (2008).

Gibbard is also referenced in "The Cones of Dunshire", an episode from the sixth season of Parks and Recreation. In the episode, April (Aubrey Plaza) attempts to promote a forest cabin to hipsters by claiming that "Ben Gibbard and Neko Case made out here once."

== Discography ==
=== Death Cab for Cutie ===
- You Can Play These Songs with Chords (1997)
- Something About Airplanes (1998)
- We Have the Facts and We're Voting Yes (2000)
- The Photo Album (2001)
- Transatlanticism (2003)
- Plans (2005)
- Narrow Stairs (2008)
- Codes and Keys (2011)
- Kintsugi (2015)
- Thank You for Today (2018)
- Asphalt Meadows (2022)
- I Built You a Tower (2026)

=== Ben Gibbard ===
- Home Volume V (split LP with Andrew Kenny, 2003)
- "Couches In Alleys" (featured on Styrofoam's album Nothing's Lost, 2004)
- Kurt Cobain About a Son: Original Score (with Steve Fisk, 2008)
- Former Lives (2012)
- Bandwagonesque (cover of Teenage Fanclub's album Bandwagonesque, 2017)
- "Do You Remember" (featured on Chance the Rapper's album The Big Day, 2019)
- "Me & Magdalena" (written by Gibbard for the Monkees' album Good Times!, 2016)
- "Keep yourself warm" (featured on Tiny Changes: A Celebration of Frightened Rabbit's 'The Midnight Organ Fight', 2019)
- "Provider" (featured on the Chong the Nomad's EP A Long Walk, 2020)
- "Every Beginning Ends" (featured on Noah Cyrus' album The Hardest Part, 2022)

=== The Postal Service ===
- Give Up (2003)

=== ¡All-Time Quarterback! ===
- ¡All-Time Quarterback! (EP, 1999)
- The Envelope Sessions (1999)
- ¡All-Time Quarterback! (album, 1999)

=== Kind of Like Spitting ===
- Bridges Worth Burning (drums, vocals, 2002)

=== American Analog Set ===
- New Equation / All I Want For Christmas (7", backing vocals, 2001)

=== With Jay Farrar ===
- One Fast Move or I'm Gone (2009)

=== Pinwheel ===
- Pinwheel (1996)

== See also ==
- Jason McGerr
- Nick Harmer
- Chris Walla
