= Barsuk Records discography =

Barsuk Records is an independent record label based in Seattle, Washington. It was established in 1998 by members of the band This Busy Monster Josh Rosenfeld and Christopher Possanza, originally to publish their own material. Since that time they have published between 3 and 15 titles each year, from a number of different artists. Titles are released primarily in vinyl, CD, cassette, and digital formats.

Release No.	Artist	Title	Formats	Release year
krang001	This Busy Monster	Belated	7"	1994
krang002	This Busy Monster	Swing Dream	7"	1995
krang003	Pea Soup	Enigma	7"	1995
krang004	This Busy Monster	Like Icicles	CD	1998
krang005	Death Cab for Cutie	Something About Airplanes	CD	1998
krang006	Jessamine	Houdini	7"	1999
krang007	Little Champions	Pillow	CD	1999
krang008	Abigail Grush	The Phantom Beat	CD	1999
bark009	Death Cab for Cutie / Fiver	Death Cab for Fiver	7"	2000
bark010	This Busy Monster	The Curious Sofa (EP)	CD	2000
bark011	Death Cab for Cutie	We Have the Facts and We're Voting Yes	CD, LP	2000
bark012	The Revolutionary Hydra	Queen of the Gravity Urge	7"	2000
bark013	This Busy Monster	Fireworks	CD	2001
bark014	John Vanderslice	Mass Suicide Occult Figurines	CD	2000
bark015	Death Cab for Cutie	The Forbidden Love EP	CD	2000
grrr01	Various Artists	Treats	CD	2000
bark016	Little Champions	Transactions & Replications	CD	2001
bark017	John Vanderslice	Time Travel Is Lonely	CD	2001
bark018	The Prom	Saloon Song + 2 (single)	CDS	2001
bark019	Rilo Kiley	Take Offs and Landings	CD, LP	2001
bark019dx	Rilo Kiley	Take Offs and Landings (Deluxe Edition)	LP	2022
bark020	Sunset Valley	Icepond	CD	2001
bark021	Death Cab for Cutie	The Photo Album	CD, LP, Cassette	2001
bark021dx	Death Cab for Cutie	The Photo Album (Deluxe Edition)	LP	2022
grrr02	Various Artists	Treats	CD	2001
bark022	The Long Winters	The Worst You Can Do Is Harm	CD	2002
bark023	Death Cab for Cutie	The Stability EP	CD	2002
bark024	John Vanderslice	Life and Death of an American Fourtracker	CD	2002
bark025	The Prom	Under the Same Stars	CD	2002
bark026	All-Time Quarterback	All-Time Quarterback	CD	2002
bark027	Kind of Like Spitting	Bridges Worth Burning	CD	2002
bark028	Death Cab for Cutie	You Can Play These Songs With Chords	CD	2002
bark029	Nada Surf	Let Go	CD, LP, Cassette	2003
bark029.3	Nada Surf	Inside of Love / Blonde on Blonde / Hi-Speed Soul	3" CD	2003
bark029.5	Nada Surf	Inside of Love (Album Version) / Inside of Love (Radio Edit)	CD	2003
bark030	Jesse Sykes & the Sweet Hereafter	Reckless Burning	CD	2003
bark031	The Long Winters	When I Pretend to Fall	CD	2003
bark032	Death Cab for Cutie	Transatlanticism	CD, SACD	2003
bark032.5	Death Cab for Cutie	Sound of Settling	CDS	2003
bark032.75	Death Cab for Cutie	Title and Registration	CD	2003
bark032demo	Death Cab for Cutie	Transatlanticism Demos	Digital only	2013
bark032lp10	Death Cab for Cutie	Transatlanticism (10th Anniversary Edition)	LP	2013
grrr03	Various Artists	Treats	CD	2003
bark033	John Vanderslice	Cellar Door	CD	2004
bark034	Aveo	Battery	CD	2004
bark035	They Might Be Giants	Indestructible Object (EP)	CD	2004
bark036	Jesse Sykes & the Sweet Hereafter	Oh, My Girl	CD	2004
bark037	Various Artists	Future Soundtrack for America	CD	2004
bark038	Travis Morrison	Travistan	CD	2004
bark039	Death Cab for Cutie	Studio X Sessions (EP)	Digital only	2004
bark040	Aqueduct	Pistols at Dawn (EP)	CD	2004
bark041	Rilo Kiley	More Adventurous	LP	2004
bark042	Aqueduct	I Sold Gold	CD	2005
bark043	Death Cab for Cutie	The John Byrd EP	CD	2005
bark044	John Vanderslice	Pixel Revolt	CD	2005
bark045	John Vanderslice	Five Years	CD	2005
bark046	Nada Surf	The Weight Is a Gift	CD	2005
bark046.5	Nada Surf	Always Love (LP Version)	CD	2005
bark047	Death Cab for Cutie	Plans	LP	2005
bark048	The Long Winters	Ultimatum (EP)	CD	2005
grrr04	Various Artists	Treats	CD	2005
bark049	Rocky Votolato	Makers	CD, LP	2006
bark050	Mates of State	Bring It Back	CD	2006
bark051	Starlight Mints	Drowaton	CD	2006
bark052	John Vanderslice	Trance Manual (EP)	Digital only	2006
bark053	Smoosh	Free to Stay	CD	2006
bark054	The Long Winters	Putting the Days to Bed	CD	2006
bark055	Nada Surf	KEXP Acoustic Session Live at the Triple Door	Digital only	2006
bark056	Jim Noir	Tower of Love	CD	2006
bark057	What Made Milwaukee Famous	Trying to Never Catch Up	CD	2006
bark058	Viva Voce	Get Yr Blood Sucked Out	CD	2006
bark059	Jim Noir	Eanie Meany (EP)	Digital only	2006
grrr05	Various Artists	Treats	CD	2006
grrr06	Various Artists	Songwriters Show, April 2005	CD	2006
bark060	Menomena	Friend and Foe	CD, LP	2007
bark061	Harvey Danger	Little Round Mirrors (single)	CDS	2006
bark062	Jesse Sykes & the Sweet Hereafter	Like, Love, Lust & the Open Halls of the Soul	CD	2007
bark063	Aqueduct	Or Give Me Death	CD	2007
bark064	Rocky Votolato	The Brag and Cuss	CD	2007
bark065	David Bazan	Fewer Moving Parts (EP)	CD, LP	2007
bark066	John Vanderslice	Emerald City	CD, LP	2007
bark067	Travis Morrison Hellfighters	All Y'all	CD	2007
bark068	Various Artists	Kurt Cobain About a Son: Music from the Motion Picture	CD	2007
bark069	Chris Walla	Field Manual	CD	2008
bark070	Nada Surf	Lucky	CD, LP	2008
bark070rs	Nada Surf	Whose Authority	CDS	2008
bark070.5	Nada Surf	Myspace Transmissions	CD	2008
bark071	What Made Milwaukee Famous	What Doesn't Kill Us	CD	2008
bark072	Steve Fisk and Benjamin Gibbard	Kurt Cobain About a Son: Original Score	LP	2008
bark073	Jim Noir	Jim Noir	CD	2008
bark074	Mates of State	Re-Arrange Us	CD, LP	2008
bark075	Death Cab for Cutie	Narrow Stairs	LP	2008
bark075.7	Death Cab for Cutie	No Sunlight (Demo) / Ice Is Getting Thinner (Demo)	7"	2008
bark076	Lackthereof	Your Anchor	CD, LP	2008
bark077	Ra Ra Riot	The Rhumb Line	CD, LP	2008
bark077.7	Ra Ra Riot	Ghost Under Rocks (Single edit) / Can You Tell (Epochs remix)	7"	2008
bark078	Nada Surf	Vinyl Box Set 1994-2008	Vinyl box set	2008
bark079	Death Cab For Cutie	Something About Airplanes Deluxe Edition	Double CD	2008
bark080	Say Hi	Oohs & Aahs	CD, LP	2009
bark081	David Bazan	American Flag	7"	2009
bark082	What Made Milwaukee Famous	The Sugarhill Sessions EP	Digital only	2008
bark083	David Bazan	Curse Your Branches	CD, LP	2009
bark083.7	David Bazan	The Man In Me / Hallelujah	7"	2009
bark084	Ra Ra Riot	Can You Tell	CDS	2009
bark085	Wooden Birds	Magnolia	CD, LP	2009
bark085.5	Wooden Birds	Montague Street	Digital only	2010
bark086	Mates of State	Re-arranged: Remixes Volume 1	12"	2009
bark087	Viva Voce	Rose City	CD	2009
bark088	Viva Voce	Octavio	Digital only	2009
bark089	Starlight Mints	Change Remains	CD	2009
bark090	Ramona Falls	Intuit	CD	2009
grrr07	Various Artists	Treats 2010	CD	2010
bark091	Rocky Votolato	True Devotion	CD	2010
bark091.7	Rocky Votolato	Rushing To The Ending / Connections	7"	2010
bark092	Blunt Mechanic	World Record	CD	2010
bark093	Phantogram	Mouthfull of Diamonds	Digital only	2010
bark094	Phantogram	Eyelid Movies	CD, LP, Cassette	2010
bark095	Pearly Gate Music	Pearly Gate Music	CD, LP	2010
bark096	Death Cab For Cutie	Open Door EP	12"	2010
bark097	Pearly Gate Music	Big Escape	7"	2010
bark098	The Helio Sequence, Menomena	Converter / Pilgrim's Progress	Split 7"	2010
bark101	Menomena	Mines	CD, LP	2010
bark102	Maps & Atlases	Perch Patchwork	CD, LP	2010
bark103	The Dismemberment Plan	Emergency & I	LP	2011
bark104	Maps & Atlases	Solid Ground	CDS	2010
bark105	Menomena	Double Seven Inch	7"	2010
bark106	Ra Ra Riot	The Orchard	CD, CD+DVD, LP	2010
bark107	Ra Ra Riot	Boy	Digital only	2010
bark108	Say Hi	Um, Uh Oh	CD, LP	2011
bark109	Say Hi	Devils	Digital only	2010
bark110	The Globes	Future Self	CD, LP	2011
bark111	The Wooden Birds	Two Matchsticks	CD, LP	2011
bark112	Nada Surf	The Moon Is Calling	7"	2011
bark113	David Bazan	Strange Negotiations	CD, LP	2011
bark114	Maps & Atlases	Living Decorations	Digital only	2011
bark115	Ra Ra Riot	Too Dramatic	Digital only	2011
bark116	Death Cab For Cutie	Codes And Keys	LP	2011
bark117	Mathieu Santos	Massachusetts 2010	LP	2011
bark118	Cymbals Eat Guitars	Lenses Alien	CD, LP, Cassette	2011
bark119	Mates of State	Mountaintops	CD, LP	2011
bark120	Yellow Ostrich	The Mistress	CD	2011
bark121	Laura Gibson	La Grande	CD	2012
bark122	Nada Surf	The Stars Are Indifferent To Astronomy	CD, LP	2012
bark122.5	Nada Surf	The Dulcitone Files	CD	2012
bark123	Phantogram	Nightlife	CD, LP	2011
bark124	Yellow Ostrich	Strange Land	CD, LP	2012
bark125	Maps & Atlases	Beware And Be Grateful	CD, LP	2012
bark126	Death Cab For Cutie	Keys And Codes Remix EP	12"	2012
bark127	Ramona Falls	Prophet	CD	2012
bark128	Ra Ra Riot / Delicate Steve	Valerie / Big Ship	Split 7"	2012
bark129	Laura Gibson	Lil' Red Riding Hood	Digital only	2012
bark130.1	Benjamin Gibbard	Ichiro's Theme	Digital only	2012
bark130	Benjamin Gibbard	Former Lives	CD, LP	2012
bark131	Menomena	Moms	CD, LP	2012
bark132	Pacific Air	Float	7"	2012
bark133	Yellow Ostrich	Ghost EP	12"	2012
bark134	Ra Ra Riot	Beta Love	CD, LP	2013
bark134.7	Ra Ra Riot	Dance With Me / Boy (live at the Moog sound lab)	7"	2013
bark135	Ra Ra Riot	Dance With Me	Digital only	2013
bark136	Ra Ra Riot	Binary Mind	10"	2013
bark137	Say Hi	Free Samples (Music From The Film)	Digital only	2013
bark138	Big Scary	Not Art	CD, LP	2014
bark139	Minor Alps	Get There	CD, LP	2013
bark140	Nada Surf / David Bazan	Wild Strawberries / The Commander Thinks Aloud	6 5/8" Lathe Cut Single	2013
grrr08	Various Artists	15th Anniversary In-Store Sampler	CD	2013
bark141	American Analog Set	Know By Heart	LP	2014
bark142	Big Scary	Twin Rivers EP	Digital only	2013
bark143	Yellow Ostrich	Cosmos	CD, LP	2014
bark143.5	Yellow Ostrich	How Do You Do It (Keith Sweaty Remix)	Digital only	2018
bark144	Death Cab For Cutie featuring the Magik*Magik Orchestra	Live 2012	LP	2014
bark145	Sunset Valley	Tropic of Candycorn	Digital only	2014
bark146	Say Hi	Endless Wonder	CD, LP	2014
bark147	Cymbals Eat Guitars	LOSE	CD, LP, Cassette	2014
bark148	Chris Staples	American Soft	CD, LP	2014
bark149	Cymbals Eat Guitars	Why There Are Mountains	LP	2014
bark150	Ra Ra Riot	Two Hearts Beat As One / Wilderness (Alt)	7"	2014
bark151	Nada Surf	B-Sides	Digital only	2014
bark28cs	Death Cab For Cutie	You Can Play These Songs With Chords	Cassette	2014
bark152	Death Cab For Cutie	Kintsugi	LP	2015
bark153.1	Small Feet	Rivers	Digital only	2015
bark153	Small Feet	From Far Enough Away Everything Sounds Like The Ocean	CD, LP	2015
bark154	Trails And Ways	Pathology	CD, LP	2015
bark155	Mates of State	You're Going To Make It EP	CD, 12"	2015
bark156	Say Hi	Bleeders Digest	CD, LP	2015
bark157	Hibou	Hibou	CD, LP, Cassette	2015
bark158	Babes	Untitled (Five Tears)	CD, LP	2015
bark159	Chris Staples	Cheap Shades EP	Digital only	2015
grrr09	Various Artists	Treats 2015	CD	2015
bark160	Ra Ra Riot	Need Your Light	CD, LP	2016
bark161	Nada Surf	You Know Who You Are	CD, LP	2016
bark162	Laura Gibson	Empire Builder	CD, LP	2016
bark163	David Bazan	Blanco	CD, LP, Cassette	2016
bark164	Chris Staples	Golden Age	CD, LP	2016
bark164.1	Chris Staples	Room Full Of Strangers	Digital only	2018
bark165	Nada Surf	Peaceful Ghosts Live With Deutsches Filmorchester Babelsberg	CD, LP	2016
bark166	Small Feet	Dreaming The Dream EP	Digital only	2016
grrr10	Various Artists	SAD!	Digital only	2017
bark167	Lo Tom	Lo Tom	CD, LP	2017
bark168	Ra Ra Riot	Need Your Light Remix EP	Digital only	2017
bark169	Charly Bliss	Guppy	CD, LP, Cassette	2017
bark169.1	Charly Bliss	Heaven	Digital only	2018
bark170	Hibou	Something Familiar	CD, LP	2018
bark171	Charly Bliss	Guppy: Issue One	Comic book/Flexi disc	2017
bark172	Ruler	Winning Star Champion	CD, LP	2018
bark172.1	Ruler	Keep Moving	Digital only	2017
bark172.2	Ruler	Complicated Mind	Digital only	2017
bark172.3	Ruler	Easy Life	Digital only	2017
bark172.4	Ruler	Not Your Friend	Digital only	2018
bark173	Charly Bliss	Soft Serve	7"	2017
bark174	Maps & Atlases	Lightlessness Is Nothing New	CD, LP	2018
bark176	Active Bird Community	Amends	CD, LP, Cassette	2018
bark176.1	Active Bird Community	Spend The Night	Digital only	2018
bark176.2	Active Bird Community	Somewhere ft. Samia	Digital only	2019
bark177	Ra Ra Riot	The Rhumb Line (Deluxe Edition)	LP	2018
bark178	Laura Gibson	Goners	CD, LP	2018
bark179	Steady Holiday	Nobody's Watching	CD, LP	2018
bark179.1	Steady Holiday	Temporary Secretary	Digital only	2018
bark179.2	Steady Holiday	Christmas Time Is Here	Digital only	2018
bark179.3	Steady Holiday	Holiday	Digital only	2019
bark179.4	Steady Holiday	Always Christmas	Digital only	2019
bark180	Death Cab For Cutie	Thank You For Today	LP	2018
bark181	Small Feet	With Psychic Powers	Digital only	2019
bark181.1	Small Feet	Ice Storm	Digital only	2018
bark181.2	Small Feet	More Dead In The Nerves	Digital only	2018
bark181.3	Small Feet	Saying Nothing On The Phone	Digital only	2018
bark181.4	Small Feet	May It Always Be	Digital only	2018
bark182	Peter Caws + Parkington Sisters	The Book Of Hylas	10" + Book	2019
bark183	Charly Bliss	Young Enough	CD, LP, Cassette	2019
bark183.1	Charly Bliss	All I Want For Christmas Is You	Digital only	2019
bark184	Benjamin Gibbard	The Swift Sessions	7"	2019
bark185	Nada Surf	Song For Congress	Digital only	2019
bark186	Chris Staples	Holy Moly	CD, LP	2019
bark187	Hibou	Halve	LP	2019
bark187.1	Hibou	Inside Illumination (Slow Magic Remix)	Digital only	2019
bark188	Death Cab For Cutie	The Blue EP	12"	2019
bark189	The Prom	Demos 2003	Digital only	2019
bark190	Common Holly	When I say to you Black Lightning	CD, LP, Cassette	2019
bark191	Nada Surf	Never Not Together	CD, LP	2020
bark191ltd	Nada Surf	Never Not Together Deluxe Edition	Digital only	2020
bark192	Charly Bliss	Supermoon	12"	2019
bark193	Various Artists	I'll Send You The Stars: Songs Of James Mendenhall	Digital only	2020
bark194	Benjamin Gibbard	Life In Quarantine	Digital only	2020
bark195	Benjamin Gibbard	Proxima B / Filler	Digital only	2020
bark196	Ra Ra Riot	The Orchard 10th Anniversary Deluxe Edition	Digital only	2020
bark197	Nada Surf	Cycle Through	LP	2021
bark198	Death Cab For Cutie	The Georgia E.P.	12"	2021
bark199	Hibou	Désir	Digital only	2021
bark120ltd	Yellow Ostrich	The Mistress 10th Anniversary Edition	LP	2021
bark200	Yellow Ostrich	Like A Bird: An Alex Schaaf Anthology 2010-2021	Digital only	2021
bark201	Matthew Caws	When History Comes	Digital only	2020
bark202	Yellow Ostrich	Soft	Digital only	2021
bark203	Sunset Valley	Amped	Digital only	2021
bark204	Common Holly	"Preoccupy / the Moon"	Digital-only single	2021
bark205	Pearly Gate Music	Mainly Gestalt Pornography	Digital only	2021

== Note ==
Some of the recording artists mentioned in this list are no longer signed by Barsuk, including Death Cab For Cutie, Rilo Kiley and Smoosh. Death Cab For Cutie have signed to the major label Atlantic Records, but continue to release vinyl versions of their records through Barsuk.

== See also ==
- Barsuk Records
