= LCA =

LCA may refer to:

== Technology ==
- Landing Craft Assault, a British landing craft of the Second World War.
- LCA (Low Cost Apple), code name for the Apple IIe
- Light Combat Aircraft program, pursued by India for the development of the HAL Tejas 4th generation fighter jet.
- Liquid Crystal Attenuator
- Lower control arm, component of an automobile suspension
- Luminance-Chrominance-Audio, video signal standard, carrying brightness and color information on separate wires.

== Mathematics ==
- Latent class analysis in statistics, a set of observed discrete multivariate variables to a set of latent variables
- Linear Correspondence Axiom, linguistic term belonging to the theory of antisymmetry
- Lowest common ancestor, in graph theory, the lowest node in T that has both v and w as descendants
- Large cardinal axiom, a type of proposed axiom in the field of set theory

== Science ==
- Last Common Ancestor, the most recent common ancestor of two populations that came to be separated by a species barrier
- Longitudinal (or lateral) chromatic aberration, a form of colour distortion in optical microscopes
- Life cycle assessment (or life cycle analysis), a technique to assess environmental impacts of products

== Medicine ==
- Leber's congenital amaurosis, a recessive genetic condition that causes blindness
- Left coronary artery
- Leukocyte common antigen

== Places ==
- La Crescenta, California (Amtrak station code)
- Larnaca International Airport, Cyprus (IATA airport code)
- Little Caesars Arena, sports arena in Detroit
- London City Airport, a small airport in the London Docklands
- Saint Lucia (ISO 3166-1 country code, IOC country code)

== Organizations ==
- Lambda Chi Alpha, one of the largest fraternities in North America.
- Land Commissioners Association, an association of state land administrators in the United States from 1931 to 1934
- Last Chance for Animals, a not-for-profit animal welfare organization
- Law Council of Australia
- LCA-Vision, a U.S. company providing LASIK vision services
- Legal & Corporate Affairs (internal legal department, e.g. at Microsoft)
- Leeds College of Art
- Legalise Cannabis Alliance
- Lexington Christian Academy (disambiguation)
- Lutheran Church in America
- Lutheran Church of Australia

== Other ==
- Labor Condition Application, included in H-1B visa application
- Leaving Certificate Applied, a two-year programme of the Irish Department of Education and Science
- linux.conf.au, the annual conference organised by Linux Australia (a.k.a. LCA)
- Liquor Control Act (Manitoba ministry)
- Lithocholic acid
- Low cost airline
- Landscape character assessment, the process of identifying and describing variation in character of the landscape; see Landscape assessment § Landscape Character Assessment (or Landscape characterisation)
