= What Doesn't Kill Us =

Studio album by What Made Milwaukee Famous
- Released: March 4, 2008
- Genre: Indie rock
- Length: 37:40
- Label: Barsuk Records
- Producer: Chris Michaels

What Made Milwaukee Famous chronology
Trying to Never Catch Up (2006)	What Doesn't Kill Us (2008)	The Sugarhill Sessions EP (2008)

Professional ratings
Review scores
Source	Rating
Allmusic	link

What Doesn't Kill Us is the second studio album by the Indie band What Made Milwaukee Famous released by Barsuk Records on March 4, 2008. The title alludes to the Nietzsche quote.

== Track listing ==
1. "Blood, Sweat & Fears" – 4:01
2. "Sultan" – 2:46
3. "Cheap Wine" – 3:21
4. "The Right Place" – 2:00
5. "For the Birds" – 3:41
6. "Self-Destruct" – 3:43
7. "Resistance St." – 3:52
8. "Prevailing Wind" – 2:32
9. "And the Grief Goes On..." – 3:27
10. "To Each His Own" – 3:05
11. "Middle of the Night" – 2:40
12. "The Other Side" – 2:23

== Personnel ==
- Michael Kingcaid – guitar, vocals, keys
- Drew Patrizi – keyboard, vocals, guitar
- John Houston Farmer – bass
- Jeremy Bruch – drums, Percussion
- Jason Davis – guitars, vocals, bass

Guest Musicians

- Steve Bernal – Cello
- David Chenu – Baritone, Tenor Saxophone
- Kim Deschamps – Pedal Steel
- Michael Hoffer – Trumpet, Trombone
- Chris Michaels – Guitar, Keys
- Pink Nasty – Vocals
- Eric Roach – Mandolin

All songs by Kingcaid except: "For the Birds" lyrics by Kingcaid, music by Farmer, Kingcaid, Patrizi, Bruch, Davis; "Resistance St." lyrics by Kingcaid, music by Kingcaid, Farmer, Patrizi, Bruch, Davis; "And The Grief Goes On..." lyrics by Kingcaid, music by Farmer, Kingcaid, Patrizi, Bruch; and "Middle of the Night" by Patrizi.

Horn arrangements for "Sultan" by Hoffer, and for "Resistance St." by Hoffer & Kingcaid. String Arrangements for "Cheap Wine" and Self-Destruct" by Bernal.

Recorded and Mixed at Cacophony Recorders in Austin, TX

Produced by Chris Michaels
Recorded by Erik Wofford
Mixed by Erik Wofford & Chris Michaels
Mastered by Jeff Lipton at Peerless Mastering in Boston, MA
Quality Control Engineer: Maria Rice

Packaging Design and artwork by Christian Helms at The Decoder Ring in Austin, TX.
