= Rhythm and blues (disambiguation) =

Rhythm and blues (R&B) is a popular music genre.

Rhythm and blues or R&B may also refer to:

== Music ==
- New Orleans rhythm and blues, a musical style that arose in the mid-20th century
- Contemporary R&B, a musical style that arose in the late 1970s
- Rhythm and Blues Foundation, an American nonprofit organization for the preservation of rhythm and blues music
- R&B Records, a 1980s British record label
- Rythm and Blues, a Polish music band formed in 1959 and disbanded 1960; most of its members on the same day formed the Czerwono-Czarni group

=== Albums ===
- Rhythm & Blues (Buddy Guy album), 2013
- Rhythm & Blues (Robert Palmer album), 1999
- Rhythm and Blues (Garou album), 2012
- Rhythm and Blues (World Saxophone Quartet album), 1989

=== Songs ===
- "Rhythm & Blues" (Ayra Starr song), 2024
- "R&B", by Ty Dolla Sign from Campaign, 2016
- "R'n'B", by Goldie Lookin Chain from Safe as Fuck, 2005
- "Rhythm & Blues", by the Head and the Heart from Signs of Light, 2016
- "Rhythm and Blues", by Twothirtyeight from You Should Be Living, 2002
- "R&B", by English Teacher from This Could Be Texas, 2024

== Other uses ==
- Rhythm and Blues (professional wrestling), a 1988–1991 WWF tag team
- Rhythm & Blues (TV series), a 1992 American sitcom

== See also ==
- The Rhythm and the Blues, a 2009 album by Jimmy Barnes
- RNB (disambiguation)
