= Blue Giant (band) =

American rock band

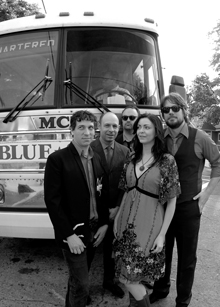
- Blue Giant - Portland Tour, 2008

Background information
- Origin: Portland, Oregon, USA
- Genres: Country, psychedelic rock, indie rock
- Years active: 2008-present
- Labels: Amore!Phonics; Jealous Butcher; Vanguard Records
- Members: Kevin Leigh Robinson; Anita Lee Elliott; Evan Railton; W.C.Beck; Jesse Bates
- Past members: Chris Funk; Seth Lorinczi; Dave Depper
- Website: Blue Giant Official Site

Blue Giant was an American rock band from Portland, Oregon. An eclectic mix of country, indie rock, and psychedelic styles, Blue Giant have been called a Portland supergroup. The band was originally composed of the songwriters and musicians from Viva Voce, Kevin Leigh Robinson and Anita Lee Elliott, Chris Funk of The Decemberists, Evan Railton of Swords, and Seth Lorinczi of The Golden Bears, Circus Lupus & The Quails. Musically, Blue Giant could be characterized as rural psychedelic rock, with one music critic calling them a perfect country rock band.

== History ==
After touring extensively in 2007 with The Shins and Jimmy Eat World, Kevin and Anita of Viva Voce took a brief hiatus. Tiring of the confines of a two-piece band, they began writing songs they considered for another band. Evan Railton of Swords was asked to play drums. Seth Lorinczi of The Golden Bears & Circus Lupus was invited to play bass. Last to join on pedal steel was Chris Funk of The Decemberists, who, upon hearing the band's early demos, demanded to join the band. Infused with their own respective indie-rock, punk and DIY backgrounds, the Blue Giant songs reflect a greater part of the Robinson's Southern heritage.

The band name is a reference to a blue giant star, a transitory phase in the life cycle of a star, and one of the brightest types of stars in the universe.

Blue Giant played their first show in June 2008 headlining the Wonder Ballroom in Portland. The band gave each audience member a free download of their first recording.

=== Collaborations ===
Blue Giant has recorded and performed with Corin Tucker of Sleater Kinney. Tucker's distinct voice is featured on a duet with Kevin Robinson on Blue Giant's debut EP.

=== Portland tour ===
Delving further in their collaborative spirit, Blue Giant went on a mini-tour of Portland in October 2008, each night bolstered by special guests such as Corin Tucker of Sleater Kinney, Sam Coomes of Quasi, Corrina Repp and Rachel Blumberg of Norfolk & Western, and M. Ward. The tour culminated in a collaboration with The Portland Cello Project, which saw Blue Giant accompanied by nine cellists.

=== Target Heart ===
Prior to release, Kevin was asked to talk about Blue Giant and the Target Heart EP in an eMusic Selects Q&A, on November 10, 2008. The 6 track CD EP was subsequently released by the imprint label Amore!Phonics. The 12" vinyl version of the album contains two additional tracks ("Wasn't Born To Follow" by The Byrds, and "Got To Be Free" by The Kinks) and was released through Jealous Butcher Records, the same label that printed the vinyl edition of Viva Voce's Rose City.

=== New tour, record deal, and lineup change ===
In February 2010, the band announced a nationwide tour and a recording deal with Vanguard Records, with plans to release a debut LP album on July 13, 2010. The announcement also stated that Funk and Lorinczi had relinquished their duties on pedal steel and bass, being replaced by Jesse Bates and Dave Depper, respectively.

== Discography ==
| Year | Title | Label |
|---|---|---|
| 2009 | Target Heart EP | Amore!Phonics / Jealous Butcher |
| 2010 | Blue Giant | Vanguard Records |
