= Living in the Past =

Living in the Past may refer to:

- "Living in the Past" (song), a 1969 song by Jethro Tull
  - Living in the Past (album), a 1972 compilation album by Jethro Tull
- Living in the Past (TV series), a 1978 UK reality programme
- "Living in the Past", a song by The Prom from Under the Same Stars
- “Living in the Past”, a song by Motörhead from their 2006 album Kiss of Death
