= Get Yr Blood Sucked Out =

Studio album by Viva Voce
- Released: September 12, 2006 (U.S.)
- Genre: Indie rock
- Label: Barsuk Records
- Producers: Anita Robinson, Kevin Robinson

Viva Voce chronology
| The Heat Can Melt Your Brain (2004) | Get Yr Blood Sucked Out (2006) | Rose City (2009) |

Get Yr Blood Sucked Out is an album by Viva Voce, released on September 12, 2006, on Barsuk Records.

== Critical reception ==
Professional ratings
Aggregate scores
| Source | Rating |
|---|---|
| Metacritic | 78/100 |
Review scores
| Source | Rating |
| AllMusic | 4/5 stars |
| Drowned in Sound | (9/10) |
| The Guardian | 4/5 stars |
| The Irish Times | 4/5 stars |
| Now | NNNN |
| Pitchfork | (8/10) |
| PopMatters | (6/10) |

Get Yr Blood Sucked Out was met with "generally favorable" reviews from critics. At Metacritic, which assigns a weighted average rating out of 100 to reviews from mainstream publications, this release received an average score of 78, based on 17 reviews.

== Track listing ==
1. "Believer"
2. "When Planets Collide"
3. "From the Devil Himself"
4. "Drown Them Out"
5. "Bill Bixby"
6. "So Many Miles"
7. "We Do Not Fuck Around"
8. "Faster Than a Dead Horse"
9. "Special Thing"
10. "Never Be Like Yesterday"
11. "Helicopter"
12. "How to Nurse a Bruised Ego"
