= Hibou =

Hibou may refer to:

- Hibou (band), an American indie pop band
- Avanà, an Italian grape variety also known as Hibou noir
