= La Grande (album) =

Studio album by Laura Gibson
- Released: January 24, 2012
- Genre: Folk rock
- Length: 35:42
- Label: Barsuk Records; City Slang
- Producer: Laura Gibson

Laura Gibson chronology
Beasts of Seasons (2009)	La Grande (2012)	Empire Builder (2016)

La Grande is the third studio album by American musician Laura Gibson. It was released on January 24, 2012 under Barsuk Records. Gibson wrote the album after spending time in the city of La Grande, Oregon, which served as a basis for the majority of its songs. The album's title track was given a music video released in February 2012.

== Release ==
La Grande was released as a joint release by Barsuk, City Slang, and Jealous Butcher Records.

== Reception ==
The album received generally positive reviews from music critics, with a 79% rating on Metacritic, an online review aggregator. James Skinner of BBC gave the album a positive review, writing: "This gem of a long-player – both sleepy and steely, mystical yet rooted in very real and universal themes – deserves all the plaudits that will hopefully meet its release." Pitchfork also gave the album a positive review, rating it 7.4 out of 10, and writing: "One wouldn't expect Gibson's latest to bowl over any audiophile chasing the wow!-factor, but for the patient, contemplative listener, La Grande-- much like the campfire depicted on its cover-- is a record worth warming to."

== Track listing ==
All tracks are written by Laura Gibson.

No.	Title	Length
1.	"La Grande"	3:50
2.	"Milk-Heavy, Pollen-Eyed"	2:56
3.	"Lion/Lamb"	4:06
4.	"Skin, Warming Skin"	3:48
5.	"The Rushing Dark"	3:04
6.	"Red Moon"	2:56
7.	"Crow/Swallow"	3:36
8.	"The Fire"	3:33
9.	"Time Is Not"	4:35
10.	"Feather Lungs"	3:18
Total length:		35:42
