= Rose City =

Rose City may refer to:

== Places in the United States ==
- Portland, Oregon, a city nicknamed Rose City or the City of Roses
- Rose City, Michigan, a city
- Rose City, Texas, a town
- Rose City, Douglas County, Minnesota, an unincorporated community
- Rose City Park, Portland, Oregon, a park

== Places in Canada ==
- Windsor, Ontario, a city nicknamed Rose City or the City of Roses
- Welland, Ontario, a city nicknamed Rose City

== Other uses ==
- A colloquial nickname for Benalla, in north-eastern Victoria, Australia
- SS Rose City, an oil tanker launched in 1976
- Rose City (soccer), a defunct New Zealand football club
- Rose City Transit, a defunct bus transportation company in Portland, Oregon, United States
- Rose City (album), a 2009 album by Viva Voce
- The Rose City, a 2001 book of short stories by David Ebershoff
