= Matter Has a Breaking Point =

Matter Has A Breaking Point

EP by Twothirtyeight
- Released: July 4, 2000
- Genre: Indie rock/Christian rock
- Label: Tooth & Nail Records, Takehold Records

Twothirtyeight chronology
Missing You Dearly (1998)	Matter Has A Breaking Point (2000)	Regulate the Chemicals (2000)

Matter Has A Breaking Point is an album by the indie rock band Twothirtyeight.

== Track listing ==
1. "Just Dropping (A Line)"
2. "To the Concerned"
3. "A Beautiful Disease"
4. "This Is Why I Wait"
5. "Suitcases For Always"
6. "Tales From Your Nightstand"
7. "You Made A Way For Moses"
8. "Far From Comfort"
