= Oohs & Aahs =

Studio album by Say Hi
- Released: March 3, 2009
- Genre: Lo-fi, indie rock
- Length: 31:21
- Label: Barsuk
- Producer: Eric Elbogen

Say Hi chronology
The Wishes and the Glitch (2007)	Oohs & Aahs (2009)	Um, Uh Oh (2011)

Professional ratings
Review scores
Source	Rating
The A.V. Club	B
Consequence of Sound	4/5 stars
Pitchfork Media	5.9/10
Spin	2/5 stars

Oohs & Aahs (2009) is the sixth full-length album by Say Hi and was released on March 3, 2009. Oohs & Aahs was written and recorded entirely by Eric Elbogen in his home studio over the course of 2008.

It was Say Hi's first release on Barsuk Records, with whom they signed on December 2, 2008.

On January 16, 2009, Say Hi released "November Was White, December Was Grey" as an exclusive download on Spin.com and updated the layout on their website.

"Oh Oh Oh Oh Oh Oh Oh Oh", "November Was White, December Was Grey" and "The Stars Just Blink for Us" were used in the television show Gossip Girl. "Oh Oh Oh Oh Oh Oh Oh Oh" was also used in a scene with Analeigh Tipton in the 2011 movie Crazy, Stupid, Love.

On September 29, 2009, a music video for "One, Two ... One" was posted on YouTube.

== Track listing ==
1. "Elouise" – 3:57
2. "Hallie and Henry" – 3:36
3. "Oh Oh Oh Oh Oh Oh Oh Oh" – 2:56
4. "November Was White, December Was Grey" – 3:04
5. "Dramatic Irony" – 2:45
6. "Maurine" – 3:15
7. "One, Two ... One" – 3:20
8. "Audrey" – 1:39
9. "The Stars Just Blink for Us" – 3:31
10. "Sallie's Heart Is Stone" – 3:22

iTunes Bonus Track Version
No.	Title	Length
11.	"Oh Oh Oh Oh Oh Oh Oh Oh [Demo]" (Bonus Track)	2:25
