= ¡All-Time Quarterback! (EP) =

EP by ¡All-Time Quarterback!
- Released: 1999
- Recorded: Winter 1999
- Genre: Indie rock
- Length: 17:00
- Label: Elsinor

¡All-Time Quarterback! chronology
¡All-Time Quarterback! (1999)	The Envelope Sessions (1999)

¡All-Time Quarterback! is the first release of Ben Gibbard's solo project ¡All-Time Quarterback!. A limited number of the CD EP was released on Elsinor Records. All of the tracks from this release were collected and re-released by Barsuk on 2002's ¡All-Time Quarterback! along with a number of tracks from The Envelope Sessions. The original CD EP release came with two inserts: one blue insert containing the lyrics and one orange insert with the credits.

== Track listing ==
1. "Plans Get Complex"
2. "Untitled"
3. "Why I Cry"
4. "Rules Broken"
5. "Send Packing"

== Credits ==
- Written, recorded, and performed by Ben Gibbard at The Hall Of Justice, winter '99
- Nick helped by playing percussion on "Untitled"
- Drums on "Why I Cry" were looped from a Rat Cat Hogan song, and thus were played by Rob
- "Why I Cry" is a Magnetic Fields song, copyright 1995 and written by Stephin Merritt
- Thank you to Allisyn, Joe and Jay Hydra, DCFC, Rat Cat Hogan, and The Gladstone House
- Letterpressing by Allisyn
