= Michael Tapper =

American drummer

- Born: Michael Shane Tapper
- Genre: Indie rock
- Occupation: Drummer
- Instruments: Drums, backing vocals
- Label: none
- Member of: Bishop Allen
- Formerly of: Yellow Ostrich; We Are Scientists

Michael Tapper is an American musician and member of the Los Angeles band Fool's Gold. He was a member of the indie rock band We Are Scientists, with Keith Murray and Chris Cain, until November 2007. He played the drums for the band and assisted with backing vocals. He was also a member of Yellow Ostrich.

== Education ==
Tapper was a 1996 graduate of the now defunct Lexington Academy in Farmers Branch, a suburb of Dallas, Texas. An avid runner during his high school days, he was a member of a State Champion Cross Country team. He finished 11th, one spot from being awarded All-State honors, at the 1995 TAPPS (Texas Association of Private and Parochial Schools) State Cross Country Meet. While at Lexington, he was also a member of the pop vocal sacred ensemble, First Light, and the lead player in a state champion percussion ensemble. He earned a Bachelor of Science in Engineering from Harvey Mudd College.

== Career ==
He received MTV's "Beard of the Year" award for 2005 and 2006.

On November 1, 2007 it was announced that Tapper "relinquished his duties as drummer of We Are Scientists in order to "pursue other things."

He is collaborating with Luke Top and listed as "voice/hand drum."
