= Empire Builder (album) =

Studio album by Laura Gibson
- Released: April 1, 2016
- Genre: Indie pop, indie rock
- Length: 40:10
- Label: Barsuk Records, City Slang
- Producer: John Askew, Laura Gibson

Laura Gibson chronology
La Grande (2012)	Empire Builder (2016)

Professional ratings
Aggregate scores
Source	Rating
Metacritic	79/100
Review scores
Source	Rating
MusicOMH	4/5 stars

Empire Builder is the fourth studio album by American musician Laura Gibson. It was released in April 2016 under Barsuk Records.

Gibson has stated that the title track was written when travelling from Oregon on the Empire Builder in order to start an MFA program in creative fiction at Hunter College New York.

== Track listing ==
No.	Title	Length
1.	"The Cause"	4:20
2.	"Damn Sure"	4:08
3.	"Not Harmless"	3:13
4.	"Empire Builder"	5:16
5.	"Five and Thirty"	4:44
6.	"The Search for Dark Lake"	3:28
7.	"Two Kids"	3:19
8.	"Louis"	3:02
9.	"Caldera, Oregon"	4:11
10.	"The Last One"	4:29
