= ¡All-Time Quarterback! (album) =

Studio album by ¡All-Time Quarterback!
- Released: January 11, 2002
- Genre: Indie rock
- Length: 27:55
- Label: Barsuk

¡All-Time Quarterback! chronology
The Envelope Sessions (1999)	¡All-Time Quarterback! (2002)

Professional ratings
Review scores
Source	Rating
Allmusic	4.5/5 stars

¡All-Time Quarterback! is the only studio album and final release from Ben Gibbard's solo project ¡All-Time Quarterback!. The album comprises a collection of tracks from the now out-of-print EPs ¡All-Time Quarterback! and The Envelope Sessions. Oddly, the ¡All-Time Quarterback! album excludes the tracks "Don't Touch the Tape", "Lullaby, Lullaby", "Dig It!" and "Stark Mobile", despite its concise length. However, it includes the previously unreleased track "Dinner At Eight in the Suburbs".

The enhanced CD features the video for "Plans Get Complex", filmed in London and edited by Aaron Stewart.

== Track listing ==
No.	Title	Length
1.	"Plans Get Complex"	2:41
2.	"Dinner at Eight in the Suburbs"	2:09
3.	"Cleveland"	2:18
4.	"Empire State"	1:36
5.	"Rules Broken"	3:17
6.	"Untitled"	3:08
7.	"Factory Direct"	2:00
8.	"Why I Cry"	3:27
9.	"Underwater!"	1:46
10.	"Sock Hop"	1:15
11.	"Send Packing"	4:18
Total length:		27:55

== Trivia ==
The track "Underwater!" went on to become a Death Cab for Cutie song, released on 7" vinyl as part of the Sub Pop Singles Club (March 2000).

== Credits ==
- Ben Gibbard – all instruments and vocals
- Nick helped by playing percussion on "Untitled".
- Drums on "Why I Cry" were looped from a Rat Cat Hogan song, and, as such, were played by Rob.
- "Why I Cry" is a Magnetic Fields song written by Stephin Merritt, copyright 1995.
