= Bleeders Digest =

Studio album by Say Hi
- Released: September 18, 2015
- Genre: Lo-Fi, Indie rock
- Length: 33:31
- Label: Barsuk
- Producer: Eric Elbogen

Say Hi chronology
Endless Wonder (2014)	Bleeders Digest (2015)	Caterpillar Centipede (2018)

Professional ratings
Review scores
Source	Rating
AllMusic	3/5 stars

Bleeders Digest (2015) is the ninth full-length album by Say Hi and was released on September 18, 2015.

== Track listing ==
1. "The Grass Is Always Greener" – 3:34
2. "It's a Hunger" – 3:19
3. "Creatures of the Night" – 3:09
4. "Transylvania (Torrents of Rain, Yeah)" – 3:03
5. "Lover's Lane (Smitten With Doom)" – 2:43
6. "Teeth Only for You" – 3:24
7. "Time Travel, Pt. 2" – 0:21
8. "Pirates of the Cities, Pirates of the Suburbs" – 3:46
9. "Galaxies Will Be Born" – 3:46
10. "Volcanoes Erupt" – 3:38
11. "Cobblestones'" – 2:48
