= The Envelope Sessions =

EP by ¡All-Time Quarterback!
- Released: 1999
- Recorded: June 3, 5, & 7, 1999
- Genre: Indie rock
- Label: Elsinor (els 028)
- Producer: Ben Gibbard

¡All-Time Quarterback! chronology
¡All-Time Quarterback! (EP) (1999)	The Envelope Sessions (1999)	¡All-Time Quarterback! (2002)

The Envelope Sessions is the second release from Ben Gibbard's solo project ¡All-Time Quarterback!. The tape was a limited release on Elsinor Records and is now out of print. Tracks from this tape were later taken and put together with the ¡All-Time Quarterback! EP and re-released by Barsuk records on the ¡All-Time Quarterback! album. The tracks "Don't Touch the Tape," "Lullaby, Lullaby," "Dig It!" and "Stark Mobile" were excluded from the re-release.

Ben recorded these songs straight to walkman, accompanied only by a toy guitar. The track "Underwater!" went on to become a Death Cab For Cutie song, released on 7" inch as part of the Sub Pop Singles Club in March 2000.

== Track listing ==
1. "Don't Touch the Tape"
2. "Underwater!"
3. "Sock Hop"
4. "Lullaby, Lullaby"
5. "Dig It!"
6. "Cleveland"
7. "Stark Mobile"
8. "Factory Direct"
9. "Empire State"

== Credits ==
Ben Gibbard: Toy guitar, vocals.

The Envelope Sessions were written June 3–5, & 7, 1999 and recorded live onto a Sony Walkman.
