= Saloon Song =

EP by The Prom
- Released: July 3, 2001
- Genre: Indie rock
- Label: Barsuk

Saloon Song is an EP by the American indie band The Prom. It was released in 2001 on Barsuk Records.

== Track listing ==
1. "Saloon Song"
2. "Now And Then"
3. "Jean Alexander Waltz (Sleepy Version)"
