= Um, Uh Oh =

Studio album by Say Hi
- Released: January 25, 2011
- Genres: Lo-Fi, Indie rock
- Length: 35:08
- Label: Barsuk
- Producer: Eric Elbogen

Say Hi chronology
Oohs & Aahs (2009)	Um, Uh Oh (2011)	Endless Wonder (2014)

Professional ratings
Review scores
Source	Rating
AllMusic	3.5/5 stars
Paste Magazine	(7.1)
Pop Matters	(7/10)
The Stranger	(Favorable)

Um, Uh Oh (2011) is the seventh full-length album by Say Hi and was released on January 25, 2011.

On November 16, 2010, "Devils" was released as an exclusive download on Spin.com and for purchase on iTunes. The song appeared in an episode of Gossip Girl titled "The Witches of Bushwick", which aired on November 15, 2010. The song also featured prominently in the second season finale of ABC Family's The Fosters on March 23, 2015. It also appeared on the soundtrack for the motion picture Scream 4.

== Track listing ==
1. "Dots on Maps" – 3:45
2. "Devils" – 2:20
3. "All the Pretty Ones" – 2:37
4. "Take Ya' Dancin'" – 3:01
5. "Posture, etc." – 2:55
6. "Sister Needs a Settle" – 3:11
7. "Lookin' Good" – 3:31
8. "My, How it Comes" – 2:23
9. "Shiny Diamonds" – 3:20
10. "Handsome Babies" – 3:23
11. "Trees Are a Swayin'" – 2:02
12. "Bruises to Prove It" – 2:40

iTunes Bonus Track Version
No.	Title	Length
13.	"Swagger" (Bonus Track)	2:04

Vinyl Edition
No.	Title	Length
13.	"Swagger" (Received once digital copy is redeemed.)	2:04
