= Under the Same Stars =

Studio album by The Prom
- Released: July 9, 2002
- Genre: Indie
- Label: Barsuk

The Prom chronology
In This Way They Found Me (2001)	Under the Same Stars (2002)

Under the Same Stars is an album by the American indie band The Prom. It was released on July 9, 2002 on the Barsuk label.

== Songs ==
1. (An Introduction To) Under the Same Stars
2. Living in the Past
3. Guarantees Aren't Easy
4. Ink on the Paper
5. A Note on the Kitchen Table
6. Brighter than the Moon
7. The Same Complaints
8. The City Gets Lonely
9. Room with White Walls
10. A Note on the Kitchen Table (reprise)
11. It's Not My Fault

== Band members ==
- James Mendenhall, lead vocalist and pianist
- David Broecker, bassist
- Joel Brown, drummer
