= This Busy Monster =

American indie rock band

- Origin: Seattle, Washington
- Genres: Indie rock
- Years active: 1992–2001
- Label: Barsuk Records
- Members: Christopher Possanza; Josh Rosenfeld; Jason Avinger; Barrett Wilke

This Busy Monster was an American indie rock band formed in Seattle, Washington in the early 1990s. The band was composed of Christopher Possanza (vocals, guitar), Josh Rosenfeld (bass guitar), Jason Avinger (guitar, vocals) and Barrett Wilke (drums).

Known for their unconventional song structures, and eclectic instrumentation (including the use of a clarinet in many tracks), the band released three full-length albums, Like Icicles, The Curious Sofa and Fireworks, and released many EPs.

This Busy Monster are also notable for forming the record label Barsuk Records, named after Avinger and Possanza's dog, which can be heard barking in the track "Song 69". Initially created in 1994 to release the band's material during their success in the early 1990s, Barsuk Records later became a very successful label in its own right, signing and releasing material from numerous local and internationally-known artists.

== History ==
This Busy Monster formed in 1992, taking their name from a poem written by E. E. Cummings, releasing their first tape, Ginger, in early 1992, before they had officially formed the band. With the release of Dark Hands in April 1993, the group was officially formed and began playing local shows. They performed numerous shows at local Seattle venues, playing with other local bands such as Sick and Wrong and The Thingmakers, and opening for the indie band Treepeople.

In 1994, the band released two singles, "Belated" in April with the help of Egg Studios and members of the band Posies, and "Swing Dream" was released in September. The band continued playing small venues with other local acts, often with members of the yet-to-be-formed Death Cab for Cutie. In 1994, they also created the band's record label Barsuk Records.

In 1995, the band went on a small tour with Built to Spill around the Pacific Northwest. In summer and fall, they finally gained notice from various music publications and touring with Modest Mouse. The Rocket (a Northwest music-related newspaper), the Seattle Weekly and the University of Washington Daily all printed good reviews, the UW Daily saying: "This four-piece blends the conventions of 'interesting' music, replete with complex structures and difficult-sounding parts, with the undeniable pop-rock sensibility. Thus, they manage to sidestep the ghettoes of prog for something altogether catchier and more satisfying but never let matters become precious or cute. They have an undeniable power when playing live that turns on tightness and the tack-sharp, vaguely dissociative lyrics and vocal lines."

In 1996 and 1997, the band continued touring with Built To Spill and Death Cab for Cutie, with the latter signing to the band's Barsuk Records label. The band began recording its first full-length album, Like Icicles, released in June 1998 on Barsuk Records. The band released two further albums, The Curious Sofa and Fireworks, in 2000 and 2001, respectively.

The current status of the band is not known, as they have been largely inactive as a group since 2001.

== Band members ==
- Christopher Possanza — guitar, lead vocals, song-writing
- Jason Avinger — guitar, back-up vocals
- Josh Rosenfeld — bass guitar
- Barrett Wilke — drums

== Discography ==
All releases on Barsuk Records

- Like Icicles (1998)
- Fireworks (2001)
- The Curious Sofa [EP] (2000)

== Resources ==
- Epitonic.com
- This Busy Monster History site
