= Ferocious Mopes =

Studio album by Say Hi
- Released: June 7, 2005
- Genre: Lo-Fi, Indie rock
- Length: 35:29
- Label: Euphobia Records
- Producer: Eric Elbogen

Say Hi chronology
Numbers & Mumbles (2004)	Ferocious Mopes (2005)	Impeccable Blahs (2006)

Professional ratings
Review scores
Source	Rating
Allmusic	3.5/5 stars

Ferocious Mopes is the third studio album by the rock band Say Hi. It was released in 2005 on Euphobia Records.

== Track listing ==
1. "The Twenty-Second Century" – 4:26
2. "The Death of Girl Number Two" – 3:50
3. "The Forest Scares the Hell Out of Me" – 4:14
4. "Yeah, I'm in Love with an Android" – 2:18
5. "I Think I'll Be a Good Ghost" – 4:41
6. "Dimensions and Verticals" – 4:21
7. "Recurring Motifs in Historical Flirtings" – 4:16
8. "Mosquitos in the Stucco" – 3:04
9. "Poor Pete Is a Bit Self Conscious" – 3:16
10. "As Smart as Geek Is Chic Right Now" – 1:03
