= Impeccable Blahs =

Studio album by Say Hi
- Released: July 25, 2006
- Genres: Lo-Fi, Indie rock
- Length: 43:01
- Label: Euphobia Records
- Producer: Eric Elbogen

Say Hi chronology
Ferocious Mopes (2005)	Impeccable Blahs (2006)	The Wishes and the Glitch (2008)

Professional ratings
Review scores
Source	Rating
Allmusic	3.5/5 stars

Impeccable Blahs is the fourth full-length album by Seattle-based indie rock band Say Hi. It was written almost entirely about vampires, though Star Trek is also mentioned. The song "Angels and Darlas" is a reference to Angel and Darla from the television series Buffy the Vampire Slayer and its spinoff Angel both created by Joss Whedon.

It was the last album to be recorded under the "Say Hi to Your Mom" moniker before the band shortened it to "Say Hi" on The Wishes and the Glitch.

== Track listing ==
1. "These Fangs" – 3:14
2. "Snowcones and Puppies" – 4:24
3. "Blah Blah Blah" – 3:26
4. "Sad, But Endearingly So" – 4:14
5. "She Just Happens to Date the Prince of Darkness" – 6:56
6. "Prefers Unhappy Endings" – 4:06
7. "Angels and Darlas" – 3:32
8. "Not as Goth as They Say We Are" – 4:42
9. "Sweet Sweet Heartkiller" – 3:18
10. "The Reigning Champ of the Teething Crowd" – 5:09
