= Trying to Never Catch Up =

Studio album by What Made Milwaukee Famous
- Released: August 22, 2006
- Recorded: 2006
- Genre: Indie rock
- Length: 48:29
- Label: Barsuk Records
- Producer: Drew Patrizi; Jim Eno; Michael Kingcaid

What Made Milwaukee Famous chronology
| Trying to Never Catch Up (2006) | The Sugarhill Sessions EP (2008) |

Trying to Never Catch Up is the first album by indie band What Made Milwaukee Famous, originally recorded in 2004 and re-recorded in 2006 with a changeup in the track list and a few new tunes for release on Barsuk Records.

== Track listing ==
All songs by What Made Milwaukee Famous.

1. "Idecide" – 4:54
2. "Mercy, Me" – 3:07
3. "Hellodrama" – 2:51
4. "Selling Yourself Short" – 4:13
5. "The Jeopardy of Contentment" – 4:52
6. "Almost Always Never" – 4:09
7. "Hopelist" – 3:25
8. "Judas" – 3:17
9. "Trying to Never Catch Up" – 4:19
10. "Curtains!" – 4:26
11. "Sweet Lady" – 2:56
12. "Bldg. a Boat from the Boards in Your Eye" – 6:01

== Personnel ==
- Michael Kingcaid – vocals, guitar, piano, organ, Rhodes, sequencer
- Drew Patrizi – keyboards, piano, organ, vocals, guitar, tambourine, sound effects
- John Houston Farmer – bass, vocals
- Josh Vernier – drums, percussion, vocals
