= 1 × 1 =

1944 book of poetry by E. E. Cummings

- First edition
- Editor: George James Firmage (2002 reprint)
- Author: E. E. Cummings
- Genre: poetry
- Published: 1944 (H. Holt); 2002 (Liveright)
- Pages: 60 (2002 reprint)
- Awards: Shelley Memorial Award
- ISBN: 9780871401809

1 × 1 (One Times One, sometimes stylized I × I) is a 1944 book of poetry by American poet E. E. Cummings. Cummings's biographer Richard S. Kennedy described the theme of the book, Cummings's ninth, as "oneness and the means (one times one) whereby that oneness is achieved—love". The book contains 54 poems, including portraits of people important to Cummings, and antiwar poems. It received the Shelley Memorial Award in 1945, and was reissued by publisher Harcourt Brace in 1954.

== See also ==
- pity this busy monster, manunkind
- Quotes from 1 × 1 at Wikiquote
