= Discosadness =

Studio album by Say Hi
- Released: August 6, 2002
- Genre: Lo-Fi, Indie rock
- Length: 32:55
- Label: Euphobia Records
- Producer: Eric Elbogen

Say Hi chronology
Discosadness (2002)	Numbers & Mumbles (2004)

Professional ratings
Review scores
Source	Rating
Allmusic	3.5/5 stars

Discosadness (2002) is the debut studio album by the rock band Say Hi. Elbogen is the only performer on the album and recorded it entirely on a Windows machine which he built himself.

== Track listing ==
1. "The Fritz" – 3:02
2. "They Write Books About This Sort of Thing" – 3:52
3. "Laundry" – 3:07
4. "The Pimp and the Sparrow" – 3:58
5. "Kill the Cat" – 3:08
6. "Unless the Laker Game Was On" – 3:14
7. "Dersmormos" – 3:08
8. "Blizzard" – 4:28
9. "Pintsized Midnight Moonbeam Workers" – 1:37
10. "The Showdown in Goattown" – 3:21
