= Numbers & Mumbles =

Studio album by Say Hi
- Released: February 10, 2004
- Genre: Lo-Fi, Indie rock
- Length: 31:43
- Label: Euphobia Records
- Producer: Eric Elbogen

Say Hi chronology
Discosadness (2002)	Numbers & Mumbles (2004)	Ferocious Mopes (2005)

Professional ratings
Review scores
Source	Rating
Allmusic	3.0/5 stars

Numbers & Mumbles (2004) is the second full-length release by Say Hi. It includes a cover of The Beatles' song "I'm So Tired". According to Elbogen, "Let's Talk About Spaceships" is the most popular song among fans and is a great crowd pleaser.

== Track listing ==
1. "Pop Music of the Future" – 3:06
2. "A Hit in Sweden" – 3:07
3. "Super" – 3:39
4. "Hooplas Involving Circus Tricks" – 4:07
5. "Let's Talk About Spaceships" – 3:03
6. "A Kiss to Make It Better" – 2:48
7. "But She Beat My High Score" – 2:11
8. "Your Brain vs. My Tractorbeam" – 3:07
9. "I'm So Tired" – 2:11
10. "The Key of C" – 4:24
