= Lexington Academy =

Lexington Academy may refer to a number of academic establishments including:

- Lexington Academy founded by Robert Tilton in Texas and now defunct
- Lexington Academy, PS72 131 East 104th Street, New York

== See also ==
- Lexington Christian Academy (disambiguation)
