= What does not kill me makes me stronger =

What does not kill me makes me stronger (German: Was mich nicht umbringt, macht mich stärker) is part of aphorism number 8 from the "Maxims and Arrows" section of Friedrich Nietzsche's Twilight of the Idols (1888).

It is quoted or alluded to by many other works, with minor variants in wording.

== Music ==
=== Albums ===
- If It Don't Kill You, It Just Makes You Stronger, a 1989 album by Bruce Willis
- What Doesn't Kill You... (Candiria album), 2004
- Ono što te ne ubije, to te osakati ('The thing that does not kill you, makes you stultified'), a 2004 album by Goribor
- What Doesn't Kill You... (Blue Cheer album), 2007
- What Doesn't Kill Us, a 2008 album by What Made Milwaukee Famous
- What Doesn't Kill Me... (Ektomorf album), 2009
- What Doesn't Kill Me... (Young Sid album), a 2010 album by Young Sid
- What Doesn't Kill You, Eventually Kills You, a 2011 album by Gay for Johnny Depp

=== Songs (including notable lyrics) ===
- "O,ti De Skotonei" ("Ό,τι δε σε σκοτώνει"), a 1991 song by Nikos Portokaloglou on the album Siko Psychi mou, Siko Chorepse
- "Only God Can Judge Me", a 1996 song by 2Pac on the album All Eyez On Me
- "Stronger" (Kanye West song), a 2007 song ("...that that don't kill me / can only make me stronger")
- "What Doesn't Kill You", a 2009 song by Takida on the album ...Make You Breathe
- "Stronger (What Doesn't Kill You)", a 2011 song by Kelly Clarkson, originally titled "What Doesn't Kill You (Stronger)"
- "What Doesn't Kill You" (Jake Bugg song), a 2013 song by Jake Bugg
- "Not Gonna Die", a 2013 song by Skillet from the album Rise ("What doesn't kill me makes me stronger")
- "Doesn't Kill You", a 2016 song by The Anchoress on the album Confessions of a Romance Novelist
- "You Ain't Ready", a 2019 song by Skillet from the album Victorious ("What doesn't kill me makes me who I am")
- "Memento Mori: The Most Important Thing the World", a 2020 song by Will Wood from The Normal Album
- "What Doesn't Kill Me", a 2021 song by Kacey Musgraves on the album Star-Crossed
- "Crown On My Head", a 2024 song by Yeji of the South Korean girl group Itzy, from the EP Born to Be
- "Saiyan", a 2024 song by Stray Kids on the album Giant ("What doesn't kill me only makes me stronger")
- "6 Months Later", a 2025 song by Megan Moroney ("What doesn't kill you calls you six months later")
- "RAWFEAR", a 2025 song by Twenty One Pilots ("You know what kills me? Not getting stronger")

== Other uses ==
- What Doesn't Kill You (film), a 2008 American crime drama by Brian Goodman
- What Doesn't Kill You, a 2012 spy novel by Iris Johansen
- "A Maxim for Vikings", a grook by Piet Hein
- As an epigraph for Conan the Barbarian (1982 film)
