= Regulate the Chemicals =

Studio album by Twothirtyeight
- Released: July 2000
- Recorded: Wisner Productions, Fort Lauderdale, Florida in May 2000
- Genre: Indie rock/Christian rock
- Label: Takehold Records
- Producer: James Paul Wisner

Twothirtyeight chronology
Missing You Dearly (1998)	Regulate the Chemicals (2000)	You Should Be Living (2002)

Professional ratings
Review scores
Source	Rating
Allmusic	2/5 stars
HM Magazine	
Cross Rhythms	4/10 stars

Regulate the Chemicals is the second album by indie rock band Twothirtyeight. The album was originally released in July of 2000 through Takehold Records.

== Reissues ==
Regulate the Chemicals was released on vinyl by BlessedKilling Records on May 1st, 2001.

After Twothirtyeight signed with Tooth & Nail Records, the album was reissued by the label on February 26th, 2002 with two new songs: "The Sticks Are Woven In The Spokes" and "Les Wirth". The additional tracks were recorded January 28-30, 2002 at Soft Rock Audio.

The album was re-released on vinyl in 2009 by Recession Records, featuring the aforementioned additional songs.

== Track listing ==
No.	Title	Length
1.	"The Hands of Men"	3:02
2.	"There Is No Dana"	3:36
3.	"Coin-Laundry Loser"	3:18
4.	"This Town Will Eat You"	5:06
5.	"The Bastard Son and the Spoiled One"	3:46
6.	"Moving Too Far"	3:28
7.	"Songs Will Write the Words"	2:49
8.	"Ears and Fingers"	2:36
9.	"Indian in Your Eyes"	3:19
Total length:		31:00

== Track listing (reissue) ==
No.	Title	Length
1.	"The Hands of Men"	3:04
2.	"There Is No Dana"	3:38
3.	"Coin-Laundry Loser"	3:18
4.	"The Sticks are Woven in the Spokes"	3:50
5.	"This Town Will Eat You"	5:08
6.	"The Spoiled One"	3:47
7.	"Les Wirth"	3:29
8.	"Moving Too Far"	3:30
9.	"Songs Will Write the Words"	2:51
10.	"Ears and Fingers"	2:38
11.	"Indian in Your Eyes"	3:23
Total length:		38:39

== Personnel ==
Twothirtyeight

- Jake Brown – bass
- Chris Staples – vocals/guitar
- D.J. Stone – drums
- Kevin Woerner – guitar

- Ben A. May – Bass and backing vocals on "Les Wirth and "The Sticks Are Woven in the Spokes"
- Dylan Daniel Roper – Drums on "Les Wirth and "The Sticks Are Woven in the Spokes"

Other Personnel

- Chris Carrabba – backing vocals
- James Paul Wisner – producer, engineer, mixer
