= The Wishes and the Glitch =

Studio album by Say Hi
- Released: February 5, 2008
- Genre: Lo-Fi, Indie rock
- Length: 35:54
- Label: Euphobia Records
- Producer: Eric Elbogen

Say Hi chronology
Impeccable Blahs (2006)	The Wishes and the Glitch (2008)	Oohs & Aahs (2009)

Professional ratings
Review scores
Source	Rating
Allmusic	3.0/5 stars

The Wishes and the Glitch (2008) is the fifth full-length album by Say Hi. It was released on CD and on Vinyl.

== Track listing ==
1. "Northwestern Girls" – 3:41
2. "Shakes Her Shoulders" – 3:36
3. "Toil and Trouble" – 3:06
4. "Back Before We Were Brittle" – 3:05
5. "Oboes Bleat and Triangles Tink" – 2:26
6. "Magic Beans and Truth Machines" – 2:03
7. "Bluetime" – 3:10
8. "Spiders" – 3:18
9. "Zero to Love" – 4:07
10. "Apples for the Innocent" – 3:38
11. "We Lost the Albatross" – 3:44
