= Trails and Ways =

American indie pop band

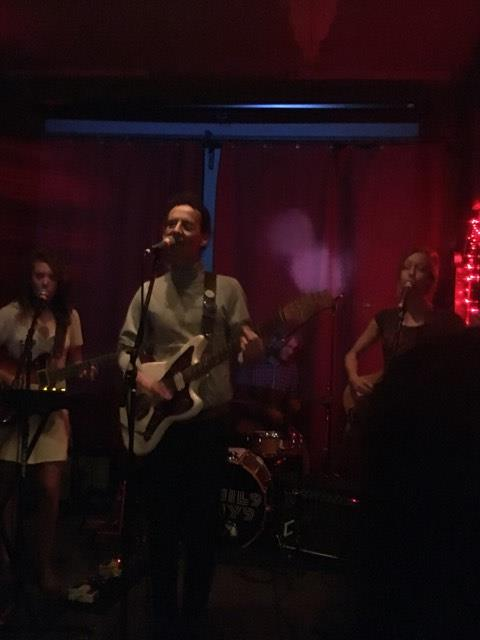

Background information
- Origin: Oakland, California, U.S.
- Genres: Indie Pop, Bossa Nova
- Labels: Balaclava Records (Brazil)

Trails and Ways is an American indie pop band from Oakland, California, United States. The band consists of founding members Hannah Van Loon (vocals, guitar and keyboard) and Emma Oppen (vocals and bass) as well as Ian Quirk (vocals and percussion) and Keith Brower Brown (vocals, guitar and keyboard). The band describes themselves as "bossa nova dream pop", combining their passion for music and their culture. The band's music is a variety of different musical genres including Bossa Nova, indie rock, disco, and radio pop.

== History ==
The members of Trails and Ways met while attending UC Berkeley, and the band was formed in early 2012, after members had lived abroad in Brazil and Spain. Their songs have included Spanish and Portuguese, and their lyrics have been described as "decidedly political". For example, their song "Skeletons" is about dancing at a club, then being "fast-forwarded a thousand years to what was left of the club on an ecologically collapsed earth". In 2015, they signed on with Barsuk Records. The band has not made any new music, but their 2010 hits remain a popular source of Bossa Nova music for all. They headed to live as far afield as Ceará in Brazil and Galicia in Spain before reuniting in Oakland to start the DIY bedroom recording project that became Trails and Ways.

== Achievements ==
The band's early singles, "Nunca" and "Mtn Tune" rocketed them to the top of the blogosphere charts, followed by national tours and opening spots for Tycho, Stars, and Mac DeMarco. Debut album Pathology landed in 2015, earning the band a spot on Barsuk Records and São Paulo's Balaclava Records, and launching the band to shows across North America and Brazil. Their lyrics and stands for environmental & social justice led Time Magazine to call them "decidedly political", their sound "lush and worldly". FADER says they're "seriously encouraging me to switch from blue jeans to bathing suits until further notice."

== Discography ==
- "Territorial" EP (2011)
- "Temporal" EP (2012)
- "Trilingual" EP (2013)
- "Pathology" (2015)
- "Own It" (2016)
