= The Heat Can Melt Your Brain =

Studio album by Viva Voce
- Released: September 14, 2004 (U.S.)
- Genre: Indie rock
- Label: Minty Fresh

Viva Voce chronology
Lovers, Lead the Way! (2003)	The Heat Can Melt Your Brain (2004)	Get Yr Blood Sucked Out (2006)

Professional ratings
Review scores
Source	Rating
AllMusic	4/5 stars

The Heat Can Melt Your Brain is an album by Viva Voce, released on September 14, 2004, on Minty Fresh.

== Track listing ==
1. "Alive With Pleasure"
2. "Lesson No. 1"
3. "Business Casual"
4. "The Lucky Ones"
5. "High Highs"
6. "Daylight"
7. "The Center of the Universe"
8. "Free Nude Celebs"
9. "Mix Tape = Love"
10. "They Never Really Wake Up"
