= ¡All-Time Quarterback! =

1997–2002 Solo side-project of Ben Gibbard

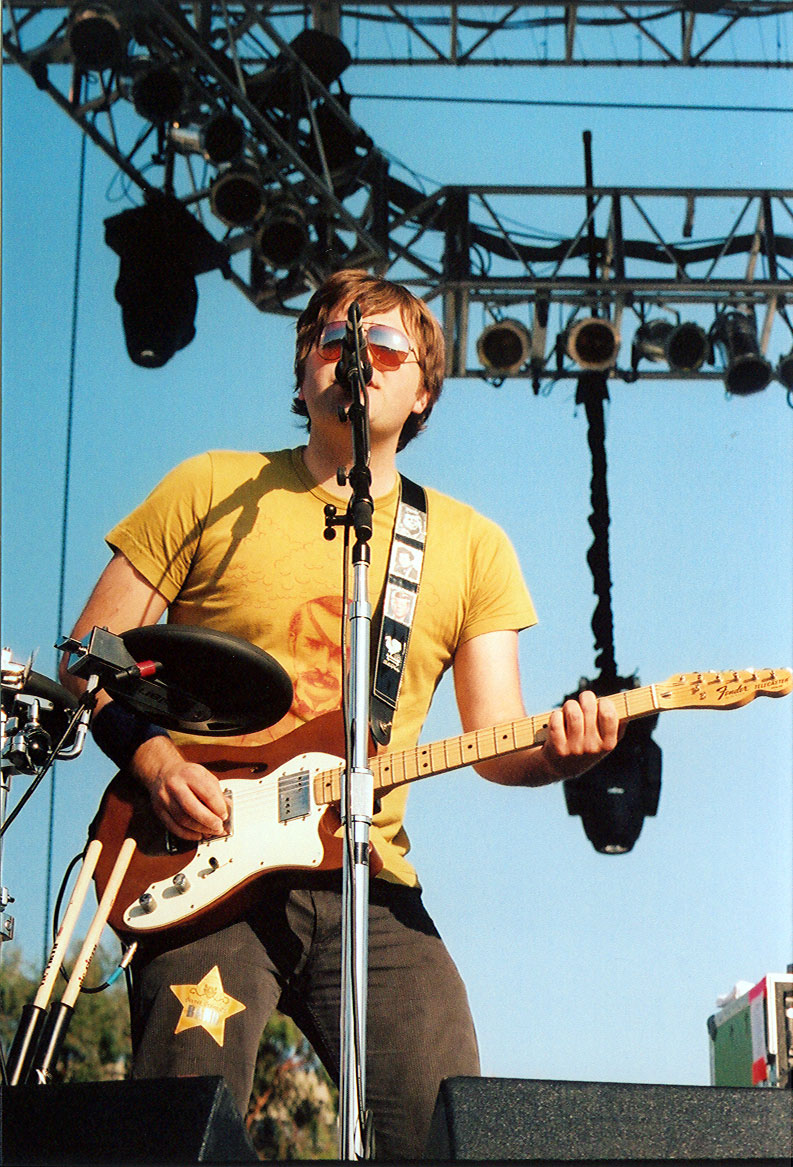

Background information
- Origin: Bellingham, Washington, United States
- Genres: Alternative rock, lo-fi, indie rock
- Years active: 1997–2002
- Labels: Elsinor; Barsuk

All-Time Quarterback (stylized ¡All-Time Quarterback!) was a solo side-project of Ben Gibbard, best known as the singer/guitarist for Death Cab for Cutie and as one third of the Postal Service.

Gibbard started the project in the spring of 1997, and a series of songs resulted in two lo-fi EPs, ¡All-Time Quarterback! and The Envelope Sessions, released in 1999 on Elsinor Records, which was documenting the Bellingham, Washington music scene. Gibbard had also started Death Cab for Cutie in 1997, a second side-project which eventually grew into a full band. A small tour occurred in 1999 to support the releases, but afterwards Gibbard went back to Death Cab for Cutie to record their second album. The song "Underwater!" from The Envelope Sessions was later re-recorded by Death Cab for Cutie for a 7" single on Sub Pop Records.

In 2002, with both original releases out-of-print, Barsuk Records released an album on CD titled ¡All-Time Quarterback!. The album contains songs from both releases, along with an outtake from the original EP sessions and a video for "Plans Get Complex", which was shot in a variety of locations across London, including Regent Street and a London Underground train.

== Discography ==
=== Studio albums ===
Title	Album details
¡All-Time Quarterback!	Released: January 11, 2002; Label: Barsuk; Format: CD, digital download, streaming

=== EPs ===
Title	EP details
¡All-Time Quarterback!	Released: 1999; Label: Elsinor; Format: CD
The Envelope Sessions	Released: 1999; Label: Elsinor; Format: Cassette
