= In This Way They Found Me =

Studio album by The Prom
- Released: 2000
- Genre: Indie
- Label: Panther Fact Records

The Prom chronology
In This Way They Found Me (2000)	Under The Same Stars (2002)

In This Way They Found Me is an album by the American indie band The Prom. It was released in 2000 through Panther Fact Records.

== Track listing ==
1. "Jean Alexander Waltz"
2. "Atama Transmission"
3. "...To the Boat"
4. "Say What You Want"
5. "Carrie"
6. "Walking Back to London"
7. "She Stays"
8. "Shiver Holds"
9. "A Letter Home"
10. "The South House"
