= The Prom (band) =

American indie-rock band

The Prom was a piano-driven indie band. Chris Walla (of Death Cab for Cutie) has done mixing for The Prom (the 3-song EP Saloon Song) and they released an album on Barsuk records.

== History ==
The Prom was formed in Seattle, Washington in 1999 by James Mendenhall and David Broecker, who had previously played together in their home town of Omaha, Nebraska. Joel Brown, an audio engineer, was brought on to play drums.

Their debut album, In This Way They Found Me, was released on Panther Fact Records in 2000. In 2001, they played west coast shows with Rainer Maria, Gorky's Zygotic Mynci and Bright Eyes. After releasing Saloon Song on Barsuk, they played a 2001 national tour with Death Cab. The band's second record, Under The Same Stars, was released in 2002. A reviewer for AllMusicGuide mentioned compared the band's music to that of Elton John, Death Cab for Cutie, Billy Joel, Grandaddy and The Black Heart Procession.

A set of demos was recorded in 2003 by Joel Brown and intended for the band's next full-length, but soon after recording the band broke up and the full-length never materialized. James Mendenhall died of cardiac arrest on January 1, 2019.

A few months later, Demos 2003 was released, along with a newly edited lyric video with tour footage from the period.

== Members ==
- James Mendenhall - vocals, piano, organ, guitar, toy piano, and synthesizer
- Joel Brown - vocals, drums, organ, and tambourine
- David Broecker - vocals, bass, organ, and shaker

== Discography ==
- (2001) In This Way They Found Me (Panther Fact Records)
- (2001) Saloon Song (Barsuk)
- (2002) Under The Same Stars (Barsuk)
- (2019) Demos 2003 (Barsuk)
