= Yellow Ostrich =

American rock band

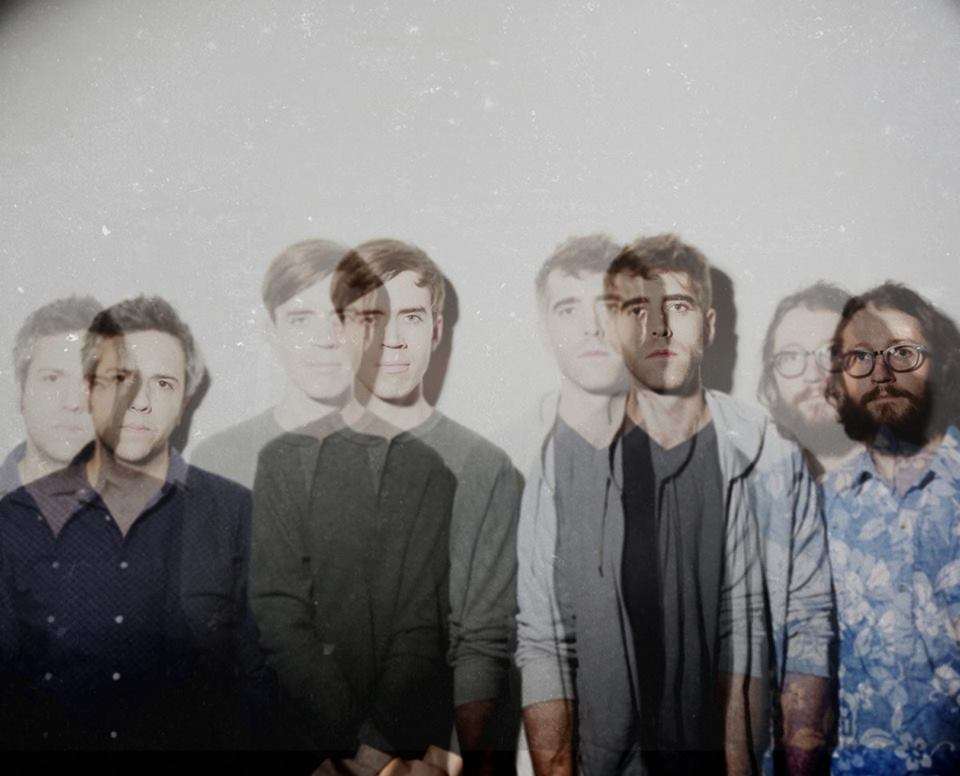

Background information
- Origin: Brooklyn, New York, U.S.
- Genres: Indie rock, Indie pop, lo-fi, shoegazing
- Years active: 2009–2014, 2021–present
- Labels: Barsuk Records
- Members: Alex Schaaf
- Past members: Michael Tapper; Jared Van Fleet; Zach Roseu; Jon Natchez
- Website: yellowostrich.com

Yellow Ostrich is an American indie rock band based in Brooklyn, New York, United States. The band formed in 2009 and ostensibly serves as the solo project of multi-instrumentalist and singer-songwriter Alex Schaaf. Previous collaborators include Michael Tapper, Jared Van Fleet and Zach Rose.

== History ==
Yellow Ostrich originated in 2009 as the solo project of Schaaf, who first started recording music in his bedroom with a 4-track recorder. While pursuing his music degree at Lawrence University in Appleton, Wisconsin, Schaaf had the opportunity to open for Bishop Allen, for whom Michael Tapper played drums at the time. The two musicians made a connection, and when Schaaf moved to Brooklyn at the same time as Tapper in 2010, they decided to perform together officially as Yellow Ostrich.

After recording their first studio album, The Mistress, the band enlisted the help of multi-instrumentalist Jon Natchez to help achieve their sound on stage. Natchez had played previously with numerous other indie bands including The Antlers and Beirut, and eventually became an official band member. While on tour in 2011, the band signed to Barsuk Records, who released the band's sophomore LP, Strange Land.

On June 10, 2013, the band announced that Jon was leaving the band to pursue other things. At that time, they announced that Jared Van Fleet and Zach Rose (who had been with the group since January 2013) were officially joining the band.

On November 7, 2014, Yellow Ostrich released a statement on their official Facebook page that they would be disbanding after their final performance, which occurred on December 8, 2014, at Glasslands Gallery in Brooklyn, New York.

On March 25, 2021, Schaaf announced the official revival of the project following a reissue of The Mistress and the release of a new compilation, Like a Bird: An Alex Schaaf Anthology (2010–2021). A new Yellow Ostrich record, Soft, was released on April 23, again via Barsuk Records. Personnel joining Schaaf on the record included Marian Li-Pino (drums and vocals), Megan Mahoney (bass), Mike Noyce (guitar, vocals, textures), Jon Natchez (saxophone), and Leah Monson (vocals).

== Discography ==
=== Albums ===
- Yellow Ostrich (2009)
- Wild Comfort (2010)
- The Mistress (2011; reissued 2021)
- Strange Land (2012)
- Cosmos (2014)
- Soft (2021)
- TRYING (2025)

=== EPs ===
- Carousels (2009)
- Whalemary 7" (2010)
- The Serious Kids EP (2010)
- The Morgan Freeman EP (2010)
- Fade Cave EP (2010)
- Ghost EP (2012)
- Make It Make Sense (2023)

=== Compilations ===
- Like a Bird: An Alex Schaaf Anthology (2010–2021) (2021)
