= Babes (band) =

- Origin: California
- Genres: Alternative rock, indie pop, indie rock
- Years active: 2013 – 2016
- Labels: Barsuk Records Harvest Records
- Members: Billy Uomo, Sarah Rayne Leigh, Jeffery Baird, Bryan Harris

Babes is a Los Angeles–based indie pop band formed in 2013. The band is made up of siblings Billy Uomo, Sarah Rayne Leigh, and their cousins Jeffrey Baird and Bryan Harris. Their music has been described by critics as sad yet irreverent pop music for the bedroom with occasional flashes of sunny surf pop.

Babes was the first ever musical guest on the podcast Harmontown in late 2016, and has since reappeared on additional episodes. The band's music has also been featured on Adult Swim, with comedians such as Eric Wareheim and DJ Douggpound starring in their videos.

Babes frontman and primary songwriter Billy Uomo also collaborates with Nedelle Torrisi on shared musical projects. Together they have appeared in music videos and also released Kinks covers and produced scores for film and television.

== Musical releases ==
Album cover of Babes by Babes.

Babes' self-titled debut EP came out in 2013 on Harvest Records. Barsuk Records released their second album Untitled (Five Tears) the following year, which is notable for having been recorded entirely on a mobile rig in various Southern California locations.
