= Say Hi =

American indie rock band

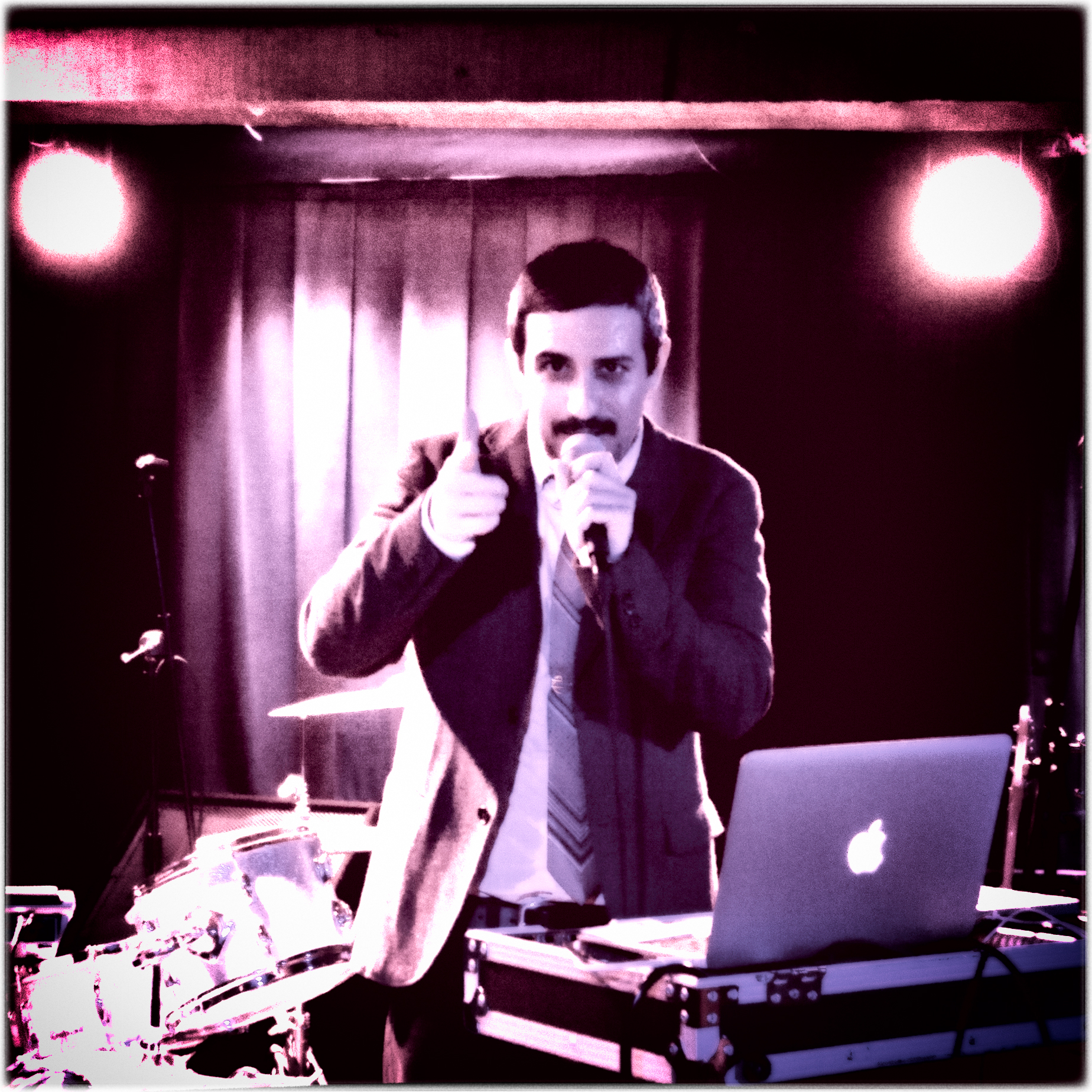
- Say Hi performing at Sunset Tavern in Ballard, Washington

Background information
- Also known as: Say Hi to Your Mom
- Origin: Seattle, Washington
- Genres: Indie rock
- Years active: 2002–present
- Labels: Barsuk Records; Euphobia Records
- Members: Eric Elbogen
- Website: www.ilikesayhi.com

Say Hi (previously known as Say Hi to Your Mom) is a Seattle-based indie rock band formed in Brooklyn in 2002 by Eric Elbogen.

Say Hi's albums are recorded at Elbogen's home, with him playing all of the instruments & providing vocals.

== Background information ==
Eric Elbogen was born in 1976 and grew up in San Fernando Valley, California. He attended UCLA.

He moved to Brooklyn, New York & created Say Hi to Your Mom in 2002.

He plays a Fender Jazzmaster guitar.

== History ==
Elbogen most often tours as a solo act, but occasionally employs friends to accompany him as his backing band.

Their fourth release, Impeccable Blahs, was written almost entirely about vampires, though Star Trek is also mentioned. The song "Angels and Darlas" is a reference to Angel and Darla from the television series Buffy the Vampire Slayer and its spinoff Angel both created by Joss Whedon.

With the release of their fifth album The Wishes and the Glitch, the band shortened their name to "Say Hi".

This was done because the earlier name reflected an aesthetic that no longer matched the band's tastes.

Say Hi covered The Violent Femmes' "Kiss Off" for American Laundromat Records' charity album "Sing Me To Sleep – Indie Lullabies" in 2010.

Elbogen's lyrics are noted as being one of the band's strengths.

== In media ==
Say Hi's song, "One, Two...One" from Oohs & Aahs was featured in a 2010 Cadillac CTS sports sedan commercial.

Say Hi's song, "November Was White, December was Grey" from Oohs & Aahs was featured during the credits of the third episode on the Showtime show, "Shameless", which aired in January 2011.

Say Hi's song, "Hallie and Henry" from Oohs & Aahs was featured in season 2 episode 8 of United States of Tara, "Explosive Diorama".

Their song "Devils" was featured in the 2011 film, Scream 4.

The song "Oh Oh Oh Oh Oh Oh Oh Oh" from the 2009 album Oohs & Aahs was featured in a scene featuring Lio Tipton (credited as Analeigh Tipton) from the 2011 movie Crazy, Stupid, Love. It was also played in Gossip Girl Season 2 Episode 23.

Say Hi's song, "Back Before We Were Brittle" from The Wishes and the Glitch serves as the theme song for Janet Varney's podcast The JV Club hosted on Nerdist.com.

An excerpt from "Back Before We Were Brittle" is used as the theme song for the TV show Playing House.

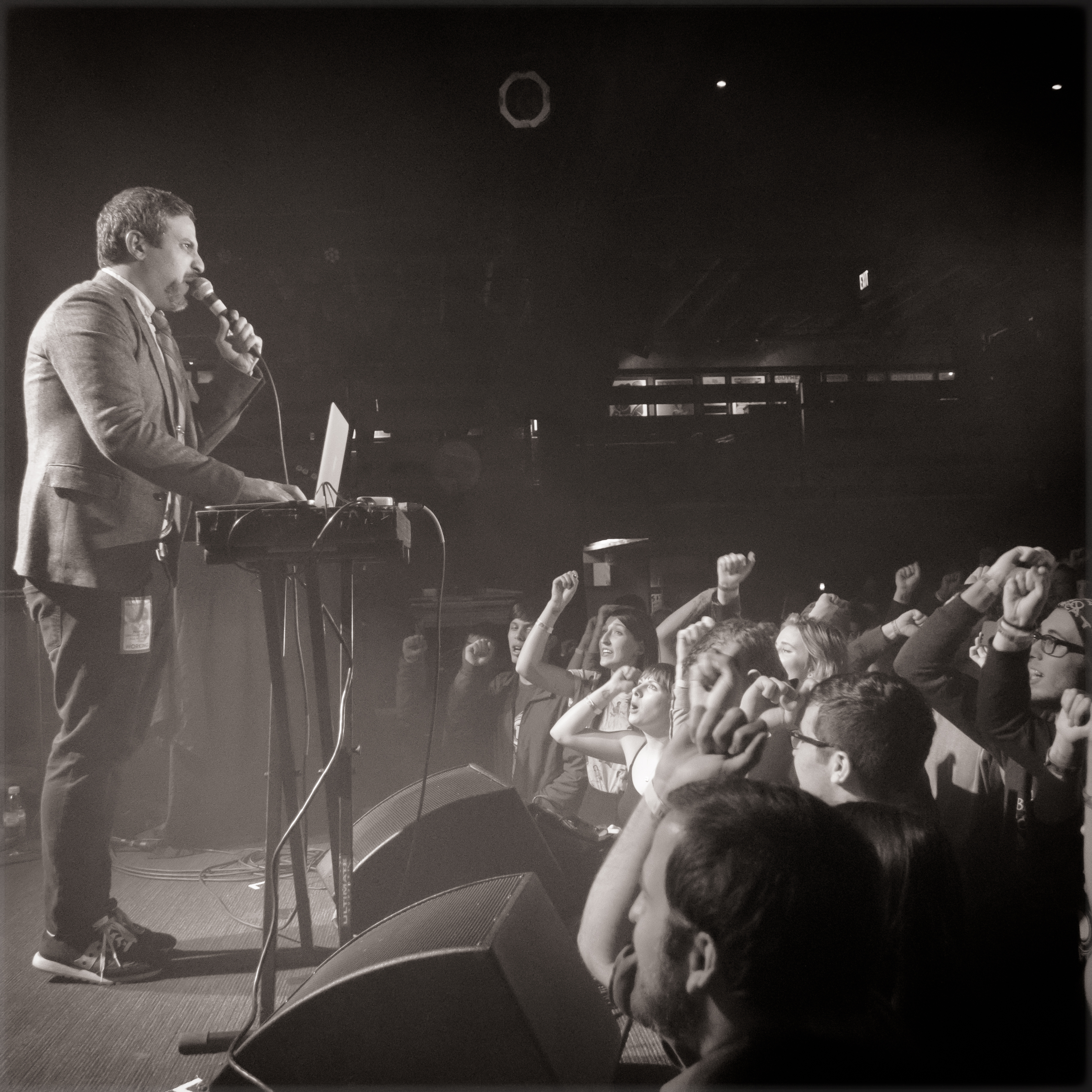
Eric Elbogen at The Crocodile in Seattle

In 2012, the songs "Shakes Her Shoulders", "Northwestern Girls", "Devils", "Shiny Diamonds" & "Love Love Love" were all featured in the 2012 movie Free Samples.

== Discography ==
=== Studio albums ===
- Discosadness (2002)
- Numbers & Mumbles (2004)
- Ferocious Mopes (2005)
- Impeccable Blahs (2006)
- The Wishes and the Glitch (2008)
- Oohs & Aahs (2009)
- Um, Uh Oh (2011)
- Endless Wonder (2014)
- Bleeders Digest (2015)
- Caterpillar Centipede (2018)
- Diamonds & Donuts (2020)
- Elocution Prattle (2023)

=== Singles ===
- Devils (2010)
