= National Association of State Trust Lands =

United States public benefit corporation representing state land administrators

- Abbreviation: NASTL
- Predecessor: Land Commissioners Association (1931–1934)
- Formation: 1949; 77 years ago
- Legal status: public benefit corporation
- President: Shawn Thomas
- Website: https://www.statetrustland.org
- Formerly called: Western States Land Commissioners Association (1949–2020)

The National Association of State Trust Lands (NASTL) is a United States public-benefit nonprofit corporation that represents the state land administrators of 23 primarily western states. It was known as the Western States Land Commissioners Association (WSLCA) from its formation in 1949 until 2020.

== History ==
NASTL was chartered in 1949, but its history can be traced to an earlier organization, the Land Commissioners Association (LCA), which was formed in Salt Lake City in November 1931. It was founded by the state land administrators of Arizona, California, Colorado, Idaho, Montana, New Mexico, Utah, and Wyoming. The LCA disbanded in 1934 after the Taylor Grazing Act rendered much of its activities obsolete, and the states returned to dealing with their land use concerns individually.

In 1949, the land administrators for eleven states (the original LCA members plus Nevada, Oregon, and Washington) chartered the Western States Land Commissioners Association. These officials felt that federal administrators at the Department of the Interior and Bureau of Land Management did not understand their day-to-day concerns and felt the need to speak with a unified voice.

In the 1990s, the WSLCA began to work more closely with a sister organization, the Eastern Land and Resources Council (ELRC), which focused on land stewardship east of the Mississippi River. The two organizations frequently sponsored joint conferences. In 2014, the WSLCA changed its bylaws to allow non-governmental affiliate members to join. And in 2020, in an effort to broaden its appeal to governments outside the Western United States, it changed its name to the National Association of State Trust Lands.

== Membership ==
NASTL membership consists of three types of members: state members, associate members, and affiliate members.

=== State members ===
State membership is open to any state administrator of public lands or state trust lands "managed for the benefit of common education or other relevant trust beneficiaries in any State in the United States of America", subject to majority approval of members present at a regular meeting. As of August 2024, the state members (with original members of the predecessor Land Commissioners Association in italics) are:

- Alaska
- Arizona
- Arkansas
- California
- Colorado
- Hawaii
- Idaho
- Louisiana
- Minnesota
- Mississippi
- Montana
- Nebraska
- Nevada
- New Mexico
- North Dakota
- Oklahoma
- Oregon
- South Dakota
- Texas
- Utah
- Washington
- Wisconsin
- Wyoming

=== Associate members ===
Associate membership is open to United States territories, Canadian provinces, and Mexican states "if the petitioning public or state trust lands administrator manages public or state trust lands for the benefit of common education or other relevant trust beneficiaries", subject to majority approval of members present at a regular meeting.

=== Affiliate members ===
Affiliate membership is open to private sector corporations, professional associations, nonprofit entities, and individuals, subject to approval by the NASTL Executive Committee. As of August 2024, the affiliate members are:

- CalPortland
- Chevron Corporation
- Creekbank Associates
- DevvStream
- EnergyNet
- EOG Resources
- Forvis, LLP
- Freeport-McMoRan
- Frontier Development Inc.
- Guggenheim Partners
- Idaho Forest Group
- ITC Transmission
- LandGate
- Madison Street Energy
- Mesa del Sol
- NextEra Energy
- Occidental Petroleum
- Pattern Energy
- Snell & Wilmer
- TS-NANO Technology
- XTO Energy
