= Rose City (album) =

Studio album by Viva Voce
- Released: May 26, 2009 (U.S.)
- Genre: Indie rock
- Label: Barsuk
- Producer: Anita Robinson, Kevin Robinson

Viva Voce chronology
Get Yr Blood Sucked Out (2006)	Rose City (2009)

Professional ratings
Review scores
Source	Rating
Pitchfork Media	7.6/10
PopMatters	6/10 stars

Rose City is an album by Viva Voce, released on May 26, 2009, on Barsuk Records.

== Track listing (CD) ==
1. "Devotion" 4:04
2. "Die A Little" 2:02
3. "Octavio" 4:31
4. "Midnight Sun" 4:14
5. "Red Letter Day" 3:50
6. "Good As Gold" 3:19
7. "Rose City" 2:54
8. "Tornado Alley" 3:29
9. "Flora" 3:54
10. "The Slow Fade" 5:23

== Track listing (vinyl) ==
1. "Devotion" 4:04
2. "Die A Little" 2:02
3. "Octavio" 4:31
4. "Midnight Sun" 4:14
5. "Red Letter Day" 3:50
6. "Hurdy Gurdy Man" 3:30
7. "Good As Gold" 3:19
8. "Rose City" 2:54
9. "Tornado Alley" 3:29
10. "Flora" 3:54
11. "The Slow Fade" 5:23
12. "Who Loves The Sun" 2:48
