= Pity this busy monster, manunkind =

Poem by E. E. Cummings

pity this busy monster, manunkind
- by E. E. Cummings
- First published in: 1944
- Country: US
- Form: Sonnet
- Meter: Free verse
- Publisher: Henry Holt (1944)
- Lines: 14

"pity this busy monster, manunkind" is a poem by American poet E. E. Cummings, first published in his 1944 book 1 × 1. It is among his best-known poems.

The poem laments the triumph of progress—defined in terms of science and technology—over nature, describing progress as a "comfortable disease", and declaring "A world of made / is not a world of born". To Cummings, the "busy monster" is a society bent on subverting nature and individual humanity, the loss of which is to be mourned. In closing, the poem's speaker suggests – with an ironic optimism – an escape to "a hell of a good universe next door".

The poem relies on coined compound words and other wordplay to carry its meaning. As with many of Cummings's poems, his idiosyncratic orthography and grammar provide an immediacy to the printed words. Like other modernist poets, Cummings uses unusual typography to draw focus to the typewriter as an instrument of the machine age.

Cummings considered the fourteen-line poem a sonnet, by his own loose definition of the term.
