= What Made Milwaukee Famous (band) =

US musical group

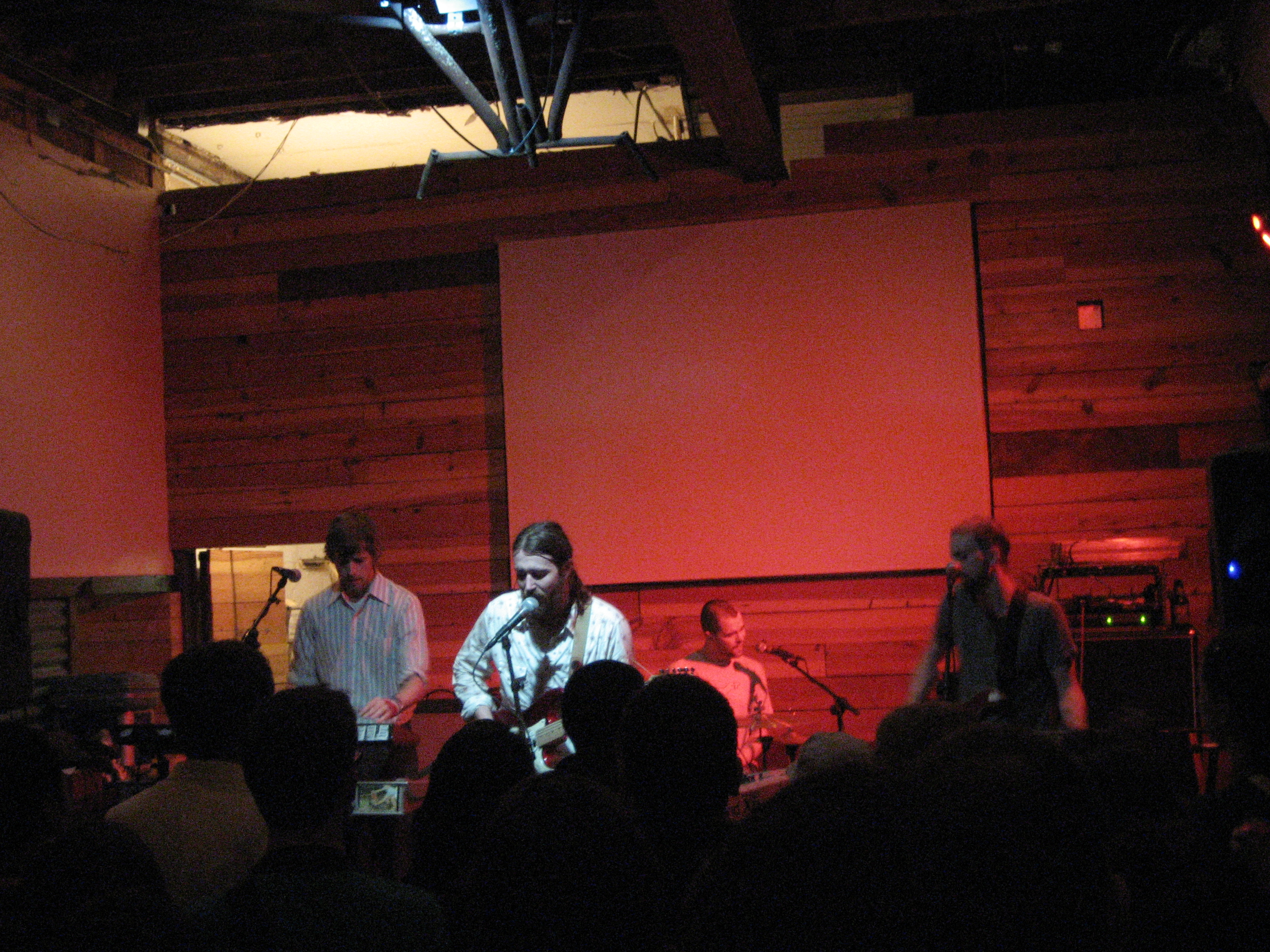
- What Made Milwaukee Famous

Background information
- Origin: Austin, Texas, U.S.
- Genres: Indie rock Pop rock
- Years active: 2002–present
- Label: Barsuk Records
- Members: Michael Kingcaid; John Farmer; Jeremy Bruch; Jason Davis; Drew Patrizi
- Past members: Josh Vernier; Geoff Guillard
- Website: whatmademilwaukeefamous.com

What Made Milwaukee Famous (WMMF) is an American indie rock band from Austin, Texas, United States.

In 2005, the band performed for Austin City Limits with Franz Ferdinand, making them one of the only unsigned bands to play for the show in its 50-year history. In 2006, the band signed with Barsuk Records, which re-released their 2004 debut album, Trying to Never Catch Up. Their second album, What Doesn't Kill Us, was released on March 4, 2008. The band released their third album You Can't Fall Off the Floor on January 22, 2013.

Since forming, the band has played at the South by Southwest music festival, the Austin City Limits Festival, and Lollapalooza. They have opened for the Smashing Pumpkins, Arcade Fire, the Black Keys, and Snow Patrol. The band has been featured on in Billboard and Rolling Stone bands-to-watch lists.

After promoting You Can't Fall Off the Floor in 2013 and 2014, the band became largely inactive.

On June 12, 2019, the band announced a set of reunion shows in September 2019, scheduled in Austin and Houston. The three tour dates coincide with a release of a newly remastered 180-gram vinyl of their debut album Trying to Never Catch Up to celebrate the 15-year anniversary of its original release.

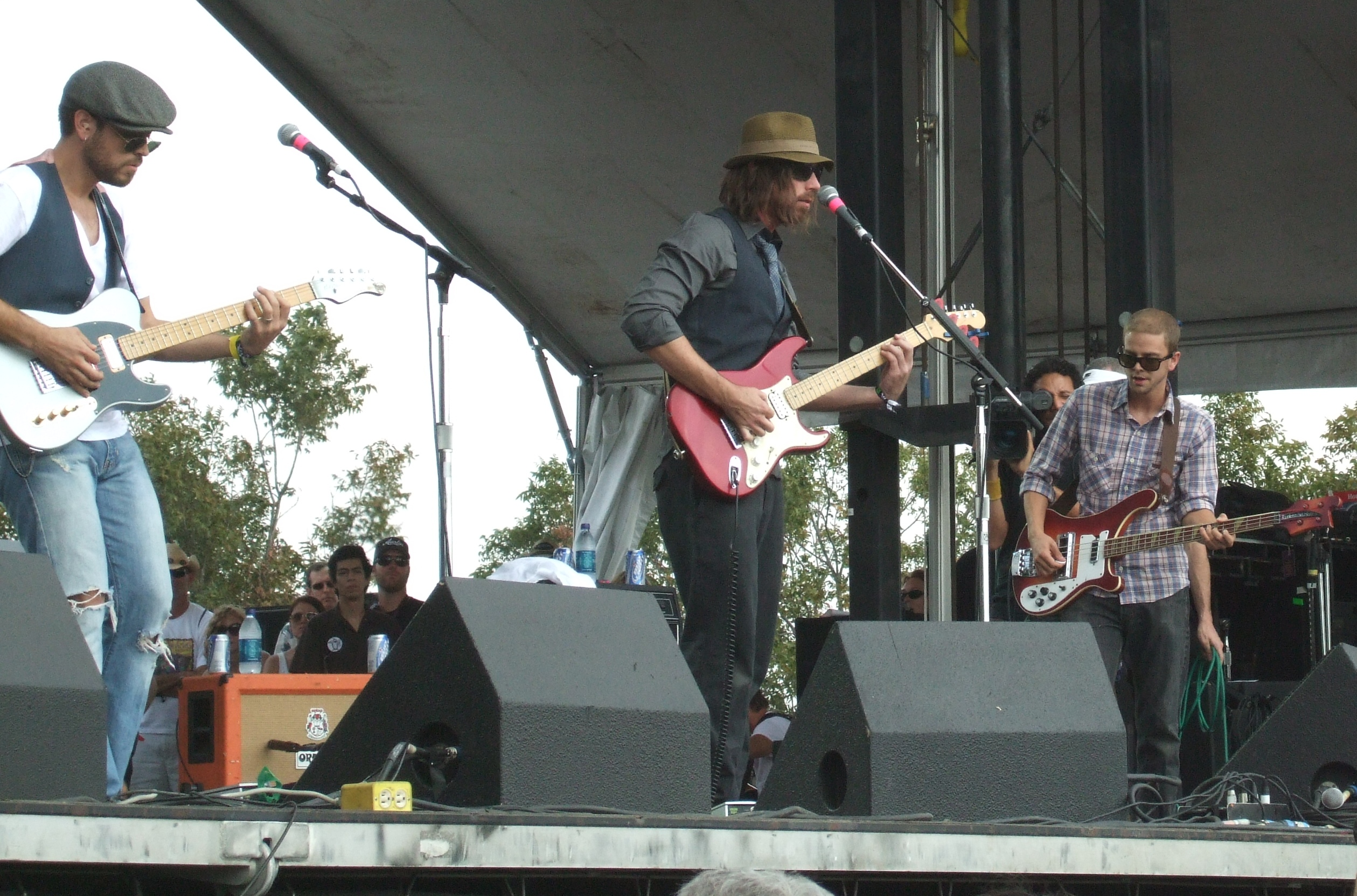

== Name origin ==
The band's name is derived from Jerry Lee Lewis's song "What's Made Milwaukee Famous (Has Made a Loser Out of Me)".

== Discography ==
- Trying to Never Catch Up - Barsuk Records (2006)
- The Sugarhill Sessions EP - Barsuk Records (2008)
- What Doesn't Kill Us - Barsuk Records (2008)
- You Can't Fall Off the Floor - Self-released (2013)

== Reviews ==
- kMNR CD Review of Trying to Never Catch Up by Chris Andrade on September 20, 2006
- CD Review of Trying to Never Catch Up (mistakenly referred to as Trying Not to Catch Up) by MC Beastie for Soundsect.com
- What Doesn't Kill Us Review on IGN by Chad Grischow on March 7, 2008
- CD Review of 'What Doesn't Kill Us' by Ashley Marie Sansotta on Mon Mar 17th, 2008
