= LCA-Vision =

American company providing vision services

LCA-Vision is a provider of photorefractive keratectomy in the United States under the LasikPlus brand. The company performs Custom LASIK, PRK and monovision treatment to correct nearsightedness, farsightedness, astigmatism and reduce the effects of presbyopia. According to the company, one million laser vision correction procedures have been performed at its LasikPlus vision centers since 1991.

== Background ==
Laser Centers of America, Inc., LCA-Vision's corporate predecessor, was incorporated in 1985. The company served as a professional management firm assisting hospitals and medical centers throughout the United States in managing their laser and minimally invasive surgery programs.

In 1991, shortly after the first laser to perform laser vision correction procedures in Canada was approved, LCA-Vision began applying its laser operating capability to the field of refractive eye surgery, particularly to Photorefractive Keratectomy (PRK), a procedure in which lasers are used to correct nearsightedness and other eye conditions. In 1995, the Food and Drug Administration (FDA) approved PRK technology in the United States. In December 1995, LCA-Vision opened its first Laser Vision Correction center in the United States at its corporate headquarters in Cincinnati. Founded and chaired by Stephen Joffe, Joffe was a practicing general surgeon and tenured, full professor at the University of Cincinnati Academic Health Center. An early advocate of applying laser technology in medical disciplines, he founded a laser technology device company and later, a laser surgery management business with hospitals and medical centers throughout the U.S.

In January 1996, shares of LCA-Vision common stock began trading on the Nasdaq SmallCap Market under the symbol LCAV. By the end of the century, LCA-Vision was the third largest publicly held vision correction company in the United States, with 21 locations in the United States and two in Canada. The company also continued to provide laser and minimally invasive surgery programs for hospitals and medical centers.

In 1997, the FDA approved the technology for a more advanced outpatient procedure for laser vision correction, Laser in-situ keratomileusis (LASIK), to treat nearsightedness, also using an excimer laser. Within one year of its FDA approval, PRK became less and less popular following the development of LASIK, a procedure that allowed patients to have their vision corrected without the need for extended recovery from surgery.

In August 1997, LCA-Vision completed its first major acquisition through the purchase of Summit Technology's laser vision correction centers, Refractive Centers International, Inc. (RCII).

In July 1999, LCA-Vision introduced the "LasikPlus" name at its laser vision correction center in Baltimore, Maryland.

== LCA-V Partnerships ==
On December 9, 2009, LasikPlus announced its partnership with the Wounded Warrior Project to provide free LasikPlus corrective vision surgery to U.S. military veterans and their spouses/caregivers across the nation.

These procedures were organized through a partnership among LasikPlus, Wounded Warrior Project and Fisher House Foundation. To date, the partnership has provided more than 70 warriors and seven caregivers with free LasikPlus laser vision correction across the country.
