= Laura Gibson =

American singer-songwriter (born 1979)

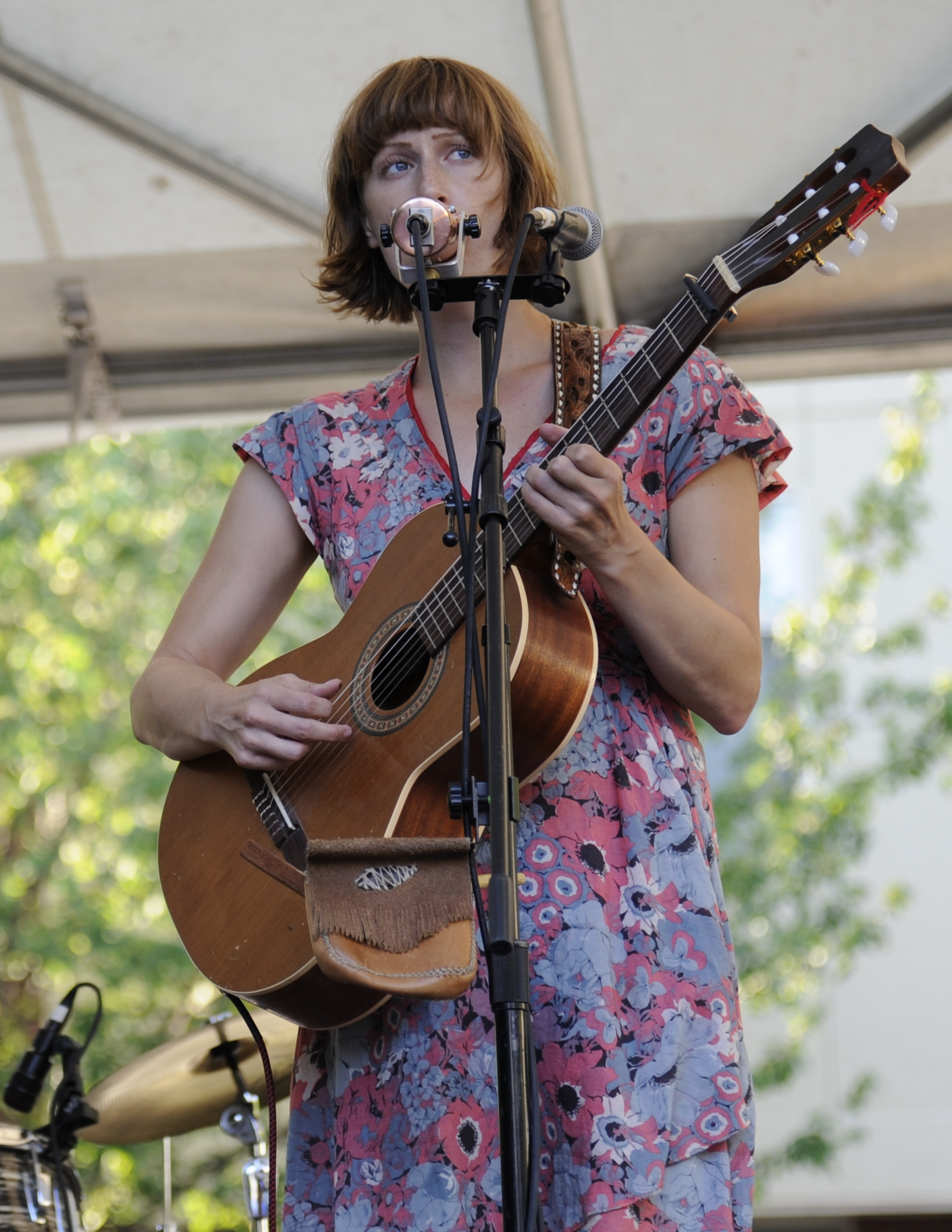
- Gibson performing live, 2012

Background information
- Born: August 9, 1979 (age 47); Coquille, Oregon, U.S.
- Genres: Folk; indie rock
- Occupations: Singer; songwriter; musician
- Instruments: Vocals; guitar
- Years active: 2004–present
- Labels: Hush; Barsuk; City Slang

Laura Anne Gibson (born August 9, 1979) is an American singer-songwriter. She currently records for the U.S. independent label Barsuk Records, and the Berlin-based label City Slang. Gibson's most recent album Goners was released October 26, 2018.

In addition to her solo work, Gibson has released a collaboration album with Ethan Rose, titled Bridge Carols, in 2009.

== Early life ==
Gibson was born and raised in the coastal logging town of Coquille, Oregon. She was classically trained on cello in her youth. Gibson's father died of cancer in her childhood. She attended Linfield College in McMinnville, Oregon where she completed pre-medicine requirements and competed for the Women's basketball and Track and Field teams.

== Career ==
=== 2004–2011 ===
Gibson relocated to Portland, Oregon after graduating from college, and worked odd jobs prior to composing music. She began performing songs for patients at hospice homes prior to writing her first extended play, Amends, which was released independently in 2004. She released her debut album, If You Come to Greet Me in 2006 on the Portland-based indie label Hush Records. Gibson collaborated with The Decemberists's drummer Rachel Blumberg on the release, as well as on her second album, Beasts of Seasons.

Gibson performed at South by Southwest in 2007 to promote If You Come to Greet Me, and was likened by critics to Jolie Holland. In 2008, she appeared on NPR's inaugural installment of Tiny Desk Concerts. The concept for the Tiny Desk Concerts was conceived following one of her concerts that NPR music journalists Stephen Thompson and Bob Boilen had attended, when they were unable to hear her performance over the noise of the crowd. Boilen then arranged for Gibson to perform at his desk at the NPR office, and it subsequently evolved into a recurring feature. She would later reappear again at the 200th concert.

In 2008, Gibson released Six White Horses - Blues & Traditionals Vol. I via Portland-based indie label Hush Records. In 2009, she released a collaboration album with Ethan Rose, titled Bridge Carols, which featured experimental vocals and was recorded in various outdoor locations.

=== 2012–present ===
Her third release, La Grande (2012), was named after and inspired by the city of La Grande, Oregon, and received critical acclaim; Pitchfork wrote of the album: "Rather than another exercise in genre-dabbling and dilettantism, La Grande succeeds as a cohesive work thanks to the persistence of Gibson's vision. As a songwriter she's preoccupied with those timeless questions of the human condition, but seldom if ever stumbles into pretension or self-satisfaction."

Gibson has composed music and lyrics for multiple commercials, including a version of "Hey There Little Red Riding Hood" for Volvo, as well as original music for Microsoft and the Humane Society. In 2014 Gibson composed the song "Live Long in Oregon" for the Cover Oregon Campaign, the Oregon branch of the Affordable Health Care Act. The commercial was discussed on several national news outlets. After Oregon dropped its state run coverage, the commercial was parodied on the premiere episode of Last Week Tonight with John Oliver, featuring Lisa Loeb in Gibson's role.

In 2015, Gibson was principal composer and lyricist for Up the Fall, a musical production created for performers with developmental disabilities, for the Portland-based Non-Profit PHAME Academy. She has also collaborated with Oregon Ballet Theatre and Portland Playhouse. On April 1, 2016, Gibson released her fourth album, Empire Builder.

== Personal life ==
In 2014, Gibson relocated from Portland, Oregon to New York City to complete a Master of Fine Arts in fiction writing at Hunter College.

On March 26, 2015 Gibson's Manhattan apartment was destroyed in the 2015 East Village gas explosion which killed two people. Gibson was home at the time of the explosion but escaped unharmed. A recovery fund, established by friends and fans, raised several thousand dollars.

== Discography ==
- If You Come to Greet Me (2006)
- Colin Meloy Sings Sam Cooke (2008); backing vocals
- Beasts of Seasons (2009)
- Bridge Carols (2009); with Ethan Rose
- La Grande (2012)
- Empire Builder (2016)
- Goners (2018)
