= Common Holly =

Canadian musician

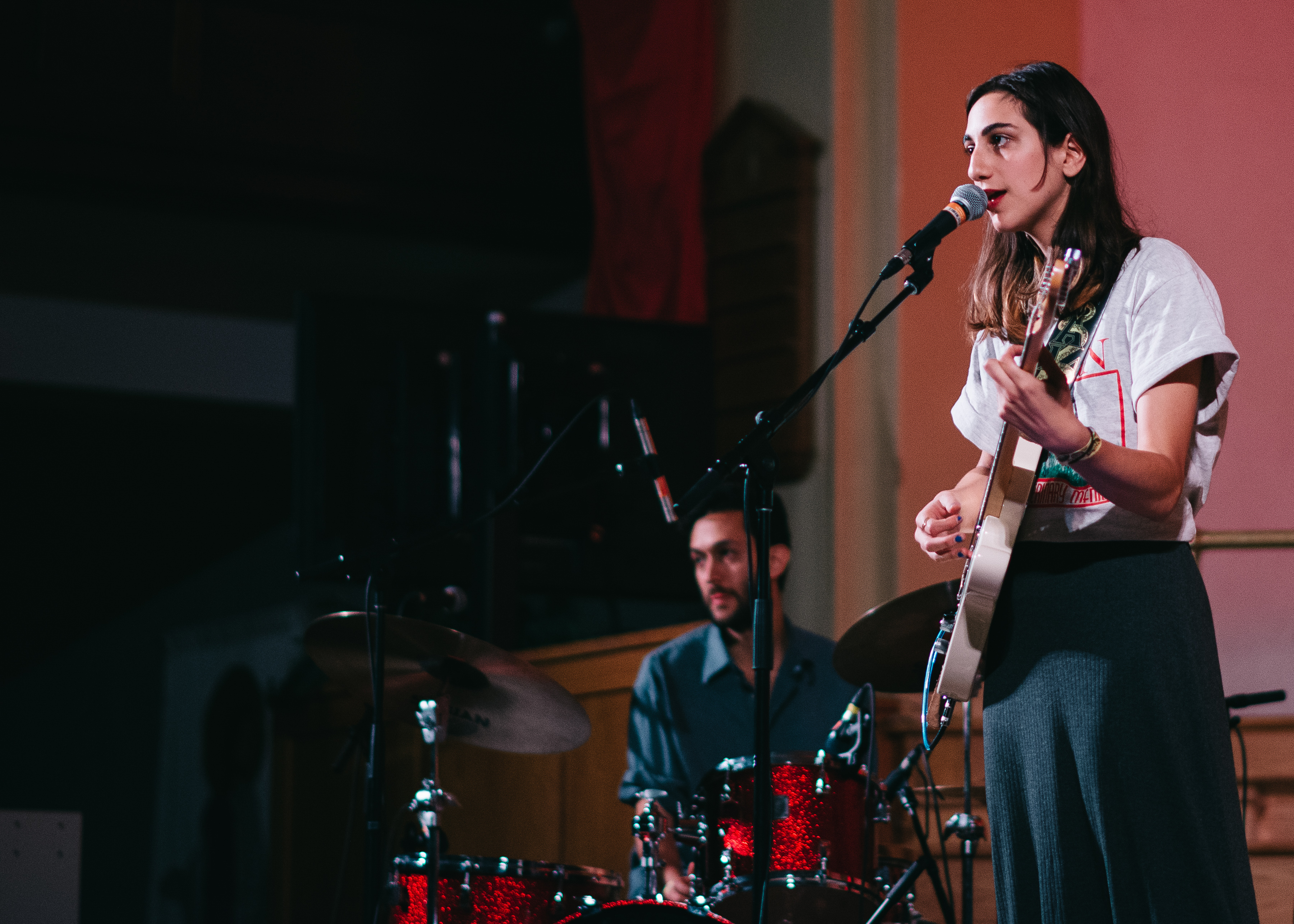
- Common Holly performing live

Background information
- Born: Brigitte Naggar; Montreal, Quebec, Canada
- Genres: Indie rock, folk, alternative
- Occupations: Singer-songwriter, musician
- Instruments: Vocals, guitar
- Years active: 2017–present (8 years)
- Label: Solitaire Recordings Barsuk Records Keeled Scales Records Paper Bag Records

Brigitte Naggar, better known by her stage name Common Holly, is a Canadian musician from Montreal, Quebec. As Common Holly, Naggar has released three albums.

== History ==
Naggar's first album, Playing House, was released in 2017. The album was originally self-released on Bandcamp, before later being widely released by Solitaire Recordings. Naggar followed up that release two years later. On July 24, 2019, Naggar announced plans to release her second album as Common Holly. Speaking about the album, Naggar stated,

This record isn't one singular statement, it documents a period of growth. The songs were written mainly over two years and they all reflect potent moments from that time. While it's obviously personal and based on my own experience, I want this album to feel familiar – life gets complicated as we grow, people form relationships to each other, they lose things, they discover pain, fear, self-delusion; sometimes it's funny, sometimes it's weird, often it sucks—and we have to navigate our way through all of that.

The album, titled When I say to you Black Lightning, was released on October 27, 2019 through Barsuk Records.

The album, titled Anything Glass, was on the released on June 15, 2025, through both Paper Bag Records & Keeled Scales Records.

== Discography ==
Studio albums

- Playing House (2017, Solitaire Recordings)
- When I say to you Black Lightning (Barsuk Records, 2019)
- Anything Glass (Keeled Scales Records & Paper Bag Records, 2025)
