= The Revolutionary Hydra =

Indie rock band

The Revolutionary Hydra were an indie rock band on Barsuk Records based in Washington. It had a rotating cast of members, including Bart Sharp, Joe Chilcote, Jay Chilcote, Benjamin Gibbard (of Death Cab for Cutie), Chris Walla (also of Death Cab for Cutie), Allisyn Levy, Robbie Skrocki, Nathan Good, and Herbert Bergel.

== Discography ==
Albums

- The Left-Handed Scissors Incident (1997)
- Pacer v. The Revolutionary Hydra (1997) split with Pacer
- Hiss Inclusive (1998)
- Tidbits of Etcetra (1998)
- Ratcheting Down the Melancholic Afterbeat; A Novel (1999)
- The Antiphony (2001)
- Knockout to Dispense (2002)
- The PEEFs (2003)

EPs

- Your Bruise (1998) split with Death Cab for Cutie
- The Swiss Admiral E.P. (2001)

Singles

- "Queen of the Gravity Urge" (2000)
- "Airport Transit Guide" (2002)
