= RNB =

RNB may refer to:

- Nankai Broadcasting (Radio Nankai Broadcasting), a broadcasting station in Ehime Prefecture, Japan
- Russian National Library
- RNB Global University, in Bikaner, Rajasthan, India
- "RNB" (song), a song by Young Dolph featuring Megan Thee Stallion from the album Rich Slave (2020)

== See also ==
- R&B, rhythm and blues music
