= Little Champions =

Little Champions is an American indie rock band from Seattle, Washington, United States, formed in 1996. The band's founding members are Becky Harbine (bass, keyboards, vocals), Scott Harbine (guitar, vocals), and Fred Stuben (drums). Later Fred Stuben switched to guitar, and Chris Shymko was recruited to play drums. The band was signed to Barsuk Records and released its first full-length album entitled Pillow in 1999. Drummer Chris Shymko left the band not long after and was replaced by Kate Kinney. The group subsequently released their second full album on Barsuk Records. Later line-up changes include the addition of Paul Mason on second guitar, later leaving the band to form his own group, Whiskey Ship Choir; the departure of Kate Kinney and return of Chris Shymko on drums; and Eric Wolfe replacing Fred Stuben on guitar. The group's third album, Fire Let Me In, Lava Let Me Out, was a self-release that debuted in July, 2008.

The band was one of the first acts to sign to Barsuk Records; their album Pillow was the 7th release on the label. They toured with Death Cab for Cutie in the Spring of 2001, down to the South By Southwest music festival in Austin, Texas. Their third release will be directly distributed through their MySpace page. The band's debut album was reviewed by Pitchfork Media and their second release by PopMatters. A live review from Performer Magazine can be found online.

== Discography ==
- Pillow (March 1999), Barsuk Records
- Transactions + Replications (August 2001), Barsuk Records
- Fire Let Me In, Lava Let Me Out, (April 2008)
