= You Should Be Living =

Studio album by Twothirtyeight
- Released: October 8, 2002
- Genre: Indie rock
- Length: 36:52
- Label: Tooth & Nail Records
- Producer: James Paul Wisner

Twothirtyeight chronology
Regulate the Chemicals (2002)	''You Should Be Living'' (2002)	El Libro De Recuerdos (2003)

Professional ratings
Review scores
Source	Rating
Allmusic	3/5 stars
Cross Rhythms	8/10
Jesus Freak Hideout	4/5

You Should Be Living (2002) is the third and last full-length album released by Twothirtyeight on Tooth & Nail Records. It was produced by James Paul Wisner, who also produced albums for Dashboard Confessional and Further Seems Forever.

== Track listing ==
1. "Modern Day Prayer" – 3:48
2. "The Sticks Are Woven in the Spokes" – 3:56
3. "Forty Hour Increments" – 2:47
4. "Romancing the Ghost" – 4:30
5. "That Sad and Holy Glow" – 2:51
6. "Step Into the Light" – 3:31
7. "Sad Semester" – 4:13
8. "I Pretend to Choke" – 4:38
9. "Rhythm and Blues" – 3:50
10. "The Bathroom Is a Creepy Place for Pictures of Your Friends" – 2:48
