= Lexington Christian Academy =

Lexington Christian Academy can refer to any of several schools:

- Lexington Christian Academy (Kentucky)
- Lexington Christian Academy (Massachusetts)
