= Chris Staples =

American musician

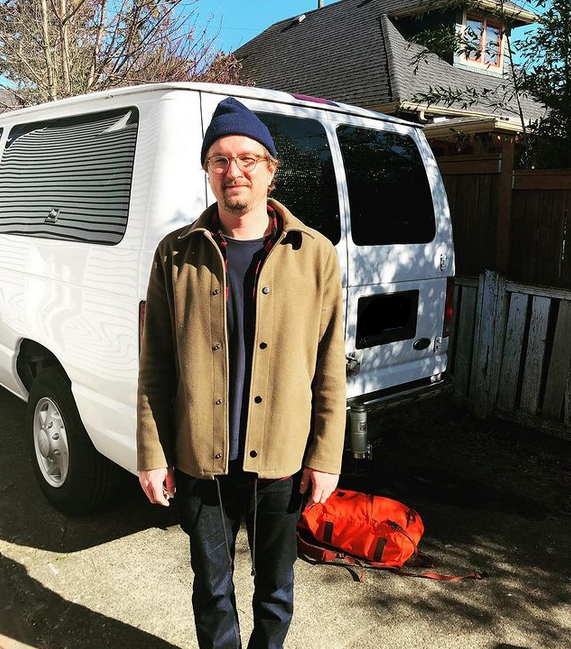
- Staples departing for tour in Seattle

Background information
- Born: Christopher Staples
- Genres: Alternative rock, indie rock
- Occupation: Musician
- Instruments: Vocals, guitar, bass, keyboards, percussion
- Years active: 1995–present
- Label: Barsuk Records
- Website: www.chrisstaplesmusic.com

Chris Staples is an American indie rock musician originally from Pensacola, Florida, long based in Seattle, Washington. He released Panama, Burned and Blistered, Blackest Hair, Bluest Eyes, Badlands, and American Soft independently, before catching the attention of Seattle-based Barsuk Records, who re-released American Soft in 2014. Staples' second album on Barsuk, Golden Age, was released in 2016. His next album, Holy Moly, was released by Barsuk on 28 June 2019.

In addition to his solo career, Staples has performed with Telekinesis, Josh Tillman, Rocky Votolato, Jeremy Enigk, and David Bazan.

Previously, Staples wrote and released music as "Discover America". Early in his career, he was the vocalist and guitarist of the indie rock band Twothirtyeight.

== Discography ==
- Panama
- Burned and Blistered
- Merci' Main
- Blackest Hair, Bluest Eyes (2004)
- Psychology (2005) as Discover America
- Badlands (2010)
- Faces – EP (2011)
- American Soft (2014)
- Golden Age (2016)
- Holy Moly (2019)
- Cloud Souvenirs (2023)
- Don't Worry (2025)
