= Viva Voce (band) =

American indie rock band

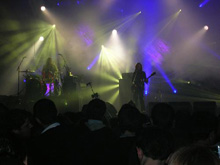
- Viva Voce in 2006

Background information
- Origin: Muscle Shoals, Alabama
- Genres: Indie rock; Christian rock; psychedelic rock; folk
- Years active: 1998–2013
- Labels: Vanguard; Amore!Phonics; Asthmatic Kitty; Minty Fresh; Barsuk; Full Time Hobby/UK; Cadence Communications
- Members: Kevin Robinson; Anita Robinson (Anita Lee Elliott)

Viva Voce was an American indie rock band from Portland, Oregon, formed by Kevin Robinson and Anita Robinson. Their music drew on several influences including psychedelic rock, classic rock, folk and R&B.

== History ==
The Robinsons formed Viva Voce in 1998 in their native Muscle Shoals, Alabama and later relocated to Nashville and then the Portland area in 2003. Their first album, Hooray for Now, was released in 1998. The band formed their own label, Amore!Phonics, and released Lovers, Lead the Way! in 2003 in conjunction with Asthmatic Kitty Records. The follow-up, The Heat Can Melt Your Brain, was released in 2004 and received positive critical response and heightened exposure for the band.

Broadening their fanbase worldwide, Viva Voce toured extensively in Europe after signing with UK indie label Full Time Hobby. They toured with The Shins and Jimmy Eat World. Their fourth album, Get Yr Blood Sucked Out, was released August 21, 2006 in Europe and September 12, 2006 in the USA. After playing their final show of 2007 on September 6 during MusicfestNW, Kevin announced that Viva Voce would be working on their new album and would continue touring in 2008.

For the 2009 album Rose City, two more band members were hired for touring, Evan Railton and Corrina Repp.

Viva Voce's sixth, and final, studio album, The Future Will Destroy You, was released on June 21, 2011 on Vanguard Records. It received positive reviews from numerous music outlets. Paste gave the album a 7.2 out of 10.

The band split up in 2013 when Kevin Robinson and Anita Lee Elliott divorced.

== Discography ==
=== Albums ===
- Hooray for Now – (1998, Cadence)
- Lovers, Lead the Way! – (2003, Asthmatic Kitty)
- The Heat Can Melt Your Brain – (2004, Minty Fresh)
- Get Yr Blood Sucked Out – (2006, Barsuk Records)
- Rose City – (2009, Barsuk Records)
- The Future Will Destroy You – (2011, Vanguard Records)

=== Singles and EPs ===
- Weightless (CD) – 2000
- Scissors and Blue Series, Vol. 3 (split w/ Soul-Junk) (CD) – Velvet Blue Music 2002
- Live at KEXP (CD) – Amore!Phonics, 2004
- Alive With Pleasure (double 7-inch & 7-inch vinyl) – Full Time Hobby, 2005
- Center of the Universe (double 7-inch) – Full Time Hobby, 2005
- Wrecking Ball (7-inch vinyl) - Full Time Hobby, 2005
- From the Devil Himself (7-inch vinyl) - Full Time Hobby, 2006
- Faster than a Dead Horse (7-inch vinyl) - Full Time Hobby, 2006
- Viva Voce Loves You EP - Full Time Hobby, 2007

=== Compilation album contributions ===
- "God Rest Ye Merry Gentlemen", "Jolly Old Saint Nicolas" and "What Child is This" on Love, Peace, and Joy (CD) - Cadence, 1997
- "Eye in the Sky" (Allan Parsons Project cover) on Bridging the Distance (CD) - Arena Rock Recording, 2007
