= Hibou (band) =

American dream pop/shoegaze band

Hibou is an American dream pop/shoegaze band based in Seattle, Washington, formed in 2013. The band consists solely of Peter Michel, who formerly toured as the drummer for Craft Spells. The band released its debut EP Dunes in 2013. Subsequently, Hibou released an eponymously titled debut album in the fall of 2015. He is said to have recorded much of the album in his bedroom and walk-in closet located in his parents’ home in Seattle. Hibou's sound is inspired by Michel's love of soda, summer, 1980s music, and Discovery Park.

In 2016, Hibou played at the South by Southwest Festival.

== Discography ==
Studio albums

- Hibou (2015)
- Something Familiar (2018)
- Halve (2019)
- It Seems To Me (2025)

EPs

- Dunes EP (2013)
- Arc EP (2023)

Singles

- Eleanor (2015)
- Fall Into (2018)
- Junipero Love (2018)
- Malison (2018)
- Fall Into (Joza Remix) (2018)
- Motion (2018)
- Inside Illumination (Slow Magic Remix) (2019)
- Désir (2021)
