= Barsuk Records =

American independent record label

Coordinates: 47.632252°N 122.359916°W

- Founded: 1998
- Founder: Christopher Possanza; Josh Rosenfeld
- Distributor: Redeye Worldwide
- Genre: Pop, indie rock
- Country of origin: U.S.
- Location: Seattle, Washington
- Official website: barsuk.com

Barsuk Records (/bɑːrˈsuːk/ bar-SOOK) is an independent record label based in Seattle, Washington which was founded in 1998 by Christopher Possanza and Josh Rosenfeld, the members of the band This Busy Monster, to release their band's material. Its logo is a drawing of a dog holding a vinyl record in its mouth.

Barsuk played a key role in shaping the mainstream view of indie rock in its early years, with albums like Nada Surf's Let Go, The Long Winters' When I Pretend to Fall, and Death Cab for Cutie's influential fourth album, Transatlanticism. The label also became a platform for Seattle-based singer-songwriters such as Rocky Votolato, Jesse Sykes, and David Bazan.

The name of the label comes from the Russian word барсук [barˈsuk], "badger". However, the label is named after Possanza and Jason Avinger's dog, a black Labrador. The dog can be heard barking in two This Busy Monster tracks: "Song 69" and "Time to Sleep".

== Artists ==
- Active Bird Community
- ¡All-Time Quarterback!
- The American Analog Set
- Aqueduct
- Aveo
- Babes
- David Bazan
- Big Scary
- Charly Bliss
- Blunt Mechanic
- Common Holly
- Cymbals Eat Guitars
- Death Cab for Cutie
- The Dismemberment Plan
- Benjamin Gibbard
- Laura Gibson
- The Globes
- Abigail Grush
- Harvey Danger
- Hibou
- Jessamine
- Kind of Like Spitting
- Lackthereof
- Little Champions
- Lo Tom
- The Long Winters
- Maps & Atlases
- Mates of State
- Menomena
- Minor Alps
- Travis Morrison (of the Dismemberment Plan)
- Nada Surf
- Jim Noir
- Pacific Air
- Phantogram
- Pea Soup
- Pearly Gate Music
- The Prom
- Ra Ra Riot
- Ramona Falls
- The Revolutionary Hydra
- Rilo Kiley
- Ruler
- Mathieu Santos
- Say Hi
- Small Feet
- Smoosh
- Chris Staples
- Starlight Mints
- Steady Holiday
- Sunset Valley
- Jesse Sykes & The Sweet Hereafter
- They Might Be Giants
- This Busy Monster
- Trails and Ways
- John Vanderslice
- Viva Voce
- Rocky Votolato
- Chris Walla
- What Made Milwaukee Famous
- The Wooden Birds
- Yellow Ostrich
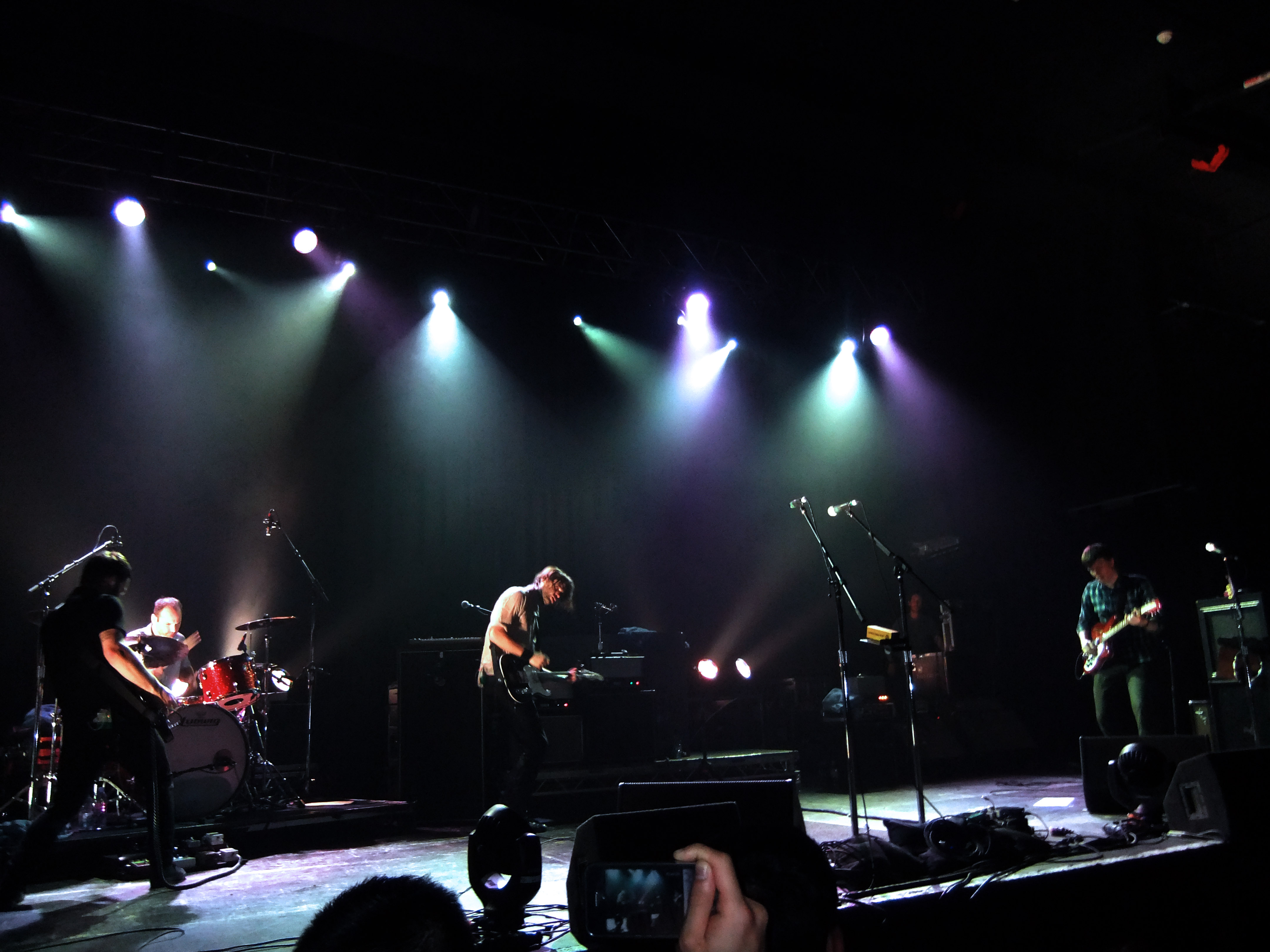
Death Cab for Cutie performs at Manchester Academy, 2011

== See also ==
- Barsuk Records discography
