= List of songs recorded by Death Cab for Cutie =

The American rock band Death Cab for Cutie has recorded songs for ten studio albums, as well as numerous extended plays. This list comprises the band's recorded catalog, as well as non-album singles, covers, and recorded appearances on other albums.

== Songs ==
Keydan
†	Indicates single release
‡	Indicates songs covered by Death Cab for Cutie

"Steadier Footing"

Name of song, originating album, and year released.
Song	Year	Album	Ref.
"20th Century Towers"	2002	The Stability EP	
"405"	2000	We Have the Facts and We're Voting Yes	
"60 & Punk"	2018	Thank You for Today	
"A Diamond and a Tether"	2009	The Open Door EP	
"A Lack of Color"	2003	Transatlanticism	
"All Is Full of Love" ‡	2002	The Stability EP	
"A Movie Script Ending" †	2001	The Photo Album	
"Amputations"	1997	You Can Play These Songs with Chords	
"An Arrow In The Wall" †	2023	An Arrow In The Wall	
"Army Corps of Architects"	1997	You Can Play These Songs with Chords	
"Asphalt Meadows"	2022	Asphalt Meadows	
"Autumn Love"	2018	Thank You for Today	
"Bad Reputation" ‡	2005	Plans	
"Before the Bombs"	2019	The Blue EP	
"Binary Sea"	2015	Kintsugi	
"Bixby Canyon Bridge"	2008	Narrow Stairs	
"Blacking Out the Friction"	2001	The Photo Album	
"Blacking Out the Friction/Brand New Love" ‡	2005	The John Byrd EP	
"Black Sun" †	2015	Kintsugi	
"Blue Bloods"	2019	The Blue EP	
"Brothers on a Hotel Bed"	2005	Plans	
"Cath..." †	2008	Narrow Stairs	
"Champagne from a Paper Cup"	1997	You Can Play These Songs with Chords	
"Christmas (Baby Please Come Home)" ‡	2004	Maybe This Christmas Tree	
"Codes and Keys"	2011	Codes and Keys	
"Company Calls"	2000	We Have the Facts and We're Voting Yes	
"Company Calls Epilogue"	2000	We Have the Facts and We're Voting Yes	
"Coney Island"	2001	The Photo Album	
"Crooked Teeth" †	2005	Plans	
"Dear Boy" ‡	2009	"Dear Boy"	
"Death of an Interior Decorator"	2003	Transatlanticism	
"Debate Exposes Doubt"	2001	The Photo Album	
"Different Names for the Same Thing"	2005	Plans	
"Doors Unlocked and Open"	2011	Codes and Keys	
"Do You Remember" † (Chance the Rapper featuring Death Cab for Cutie)	2019	The Big Day	
"Dream Scream" ‡	2004	The Late Great Daniel Johnston: Discovered Covered	
"Earth Angel" ‡	2005	Stubbs the Zombie: The Soundtrack	
"El Dorado"	2015	Kintsugi	
"Everything's a Ceiling"	2015	Kintsugi	
"Expo '86"	2003	Transatlanticism	
"Fake Frowns"	1998	Something About Airplanes	
"Flustered/Hey Tomcat!"	1997	You Can Play These Songs with Chords	
"Forgive Me My Love" (Remix) ‡	2015	Yes, I'm a Witch Too	
"Fortunate Son" ‡	2002	Don't Know When I'll Be Back Again	
"For What Reason"	2000	We Have the Facts and We're Voting Yes	
"Foxglove Through the Clearcut" †	2022	Asphalt Meadows	
"Fragments from the Decade"	2022	Asphalt Meadows	
"Gold Rush" †	2018	Thank You for Today	
"Good Help (Is So Hard to Find)" †	2015	Kintsugi	
"Grapevine Fires" †	2008	Narrow Stairs	
"Gridlock Caravans"	2001	The Photo Album	
"Here to Forever" †	2022	Asphalt Meadows	
"Hindsight"	1997	You Can Play These Songs with Chords	
"Hold No Guns"	2015	Kintsugi	
"Home Is a Fire" †	2011	Codes and Keys	
"I Don't Know How I Survive"	2022	Asphalt Meadows	
"I Dreamt We Spoke Again" †	2018	Thank You for Today	
"I'll Never Give Up on You"	2022	Asphalt Meadows	
"I Miss Strangers"	2022	Asphalt Meadows	
"Information Travels Faster"	2001	The Photo Album	
"Ingénue"	2015	Kintsugi	
"I Was a Kaleidoscope" †	2001	The Photo Album	
"I Was Once a Loyal Lover"	2009	The Open Door EP	
"I Will Follow You into the Dark" †	2005	Plans	
"I Will Possess Your Heart" †	2008	Narrow Stairs	
"Jealousy Rides with Me"	2005	Plans	
"Kicked In" ‡	2009	SCORE! 20 Years of Merge Records: The Covers!	
"Kids in '99" †	2019	The Blue EP	
"Lightness"	2003	Transatlanticism	
"Line of Best Fit"	1997	You Can Play These Songs with Chords	
"Little Bribes" †	2009	The Open Door EP	
"Little Fury Bugs"	2000	We Have the Facts and We're Voting Yes	
"Little Wanderer"	2015	Kintsugi	
"Long Division"	2008	Narrow Stairs	
"Lovesong" ‡	2005	For Unicef - Tsunami Relief Fund Compilation	
"Lowell, MA"	2000	We Have the Facts and We're Voting Yes	
"Man in Blue"	2019	The Blue EP	
"Marching Bands of Manhattan"	2005	Plans	
"Meet Me on the Equinox" †	2009	The Twilight Saga: New Moon – Original Motion Picture Soundtrack	
"Million Dollar Loan" †	2016	30 Days, 30 Songs	
"Monday Morning"	2011	Codes and Keys	
"My Backwards Walk" ‡	2018	Spotify Sessions	
"My Mirror Speaks"	2009	The Open Door EP	
"Near/Far"	2018	Thank You for Today	
"New Candles"	1997	You Can Play These Songs with Chords	
"No Joy in Mudville"	2000	We Have the Facts and We're Voting Yes	
"No Room in Frame"	2015	Kintsugi	
"No Sunlight" †	2008	Narrow Stairs	
"Northern Lights" †	2018	Thank You for Today	
"Passenger Seat"	2003	Transatlanticism	
"Pepper"	2022	Asphalt Meadows	
"Photobooth"	2000	The Forbidden Love EP	
"Pictures in an Exhibition"	1997	You Can Play These Songs with Chords	
"Pity and Fear"	2008	Narrow Stairs	
"Portable Television"	2011	Codes and Keys	
"President of What?"	1997	You Can Play These Songs with Chords	
"Prove My Hypotheses" †	1997	You Can Play These Songs with Chords	
"Punching The Flowers" †	2026	I Built You A Tower	
"Rand McNally"	2022	Asphalt Meadows	
"Riptides" †	2026	I Built You A Tower	
"Rockin' Chair" ‡	2007	Endless Highway: The Music of The Band	
"Roman Candles" †	2022	Asphalt Meadows	
"Scientist Studies"	2000	We Have the Facts and We're Voting Yes	
"Sleep Spent"	1998	Something About Airplanes	
"Some Boys"	2011	Codes and Keys	
"Someday You Will Be Loved"	2005	Plans	
"Song for Kelly Huckaby"	1997	You Can Play These Songs with Chords	
"Soul Meets Body" †	2005	Plans	
"Spring Break Broke"	2000	Death Cab for Fiver	
"St. Peter's Cathedral"	2011	Codes and Keys	
"Stability" †	2002	The Stability EP	
"Stable Song"	2005	Plans	
"Start Again" ‡	2005	Plans	
"State Street Residential"	1997	You Can Play These Songs with Chords	
"Stay Young, Go Dancing" †	2011	Codes and Keys	
"Steadier Footing"	2001	The Photo Album	
"Stone Over Water" †	2026	I Built You a Tower	
"Styrofoam Plates"	2001	The Photo Album	
"Summer Skin"	2005	Plans	
"Summer Years"	2018	Thank You for Today	
"Sweet and Tender Hooligan" ‡	1998	Something About Airplanes	
"Talking Bird"	2008	Narrow Stairs	
"Talking Like Turnstiles"	2005	Plans	
"Technicolor Girls"	2000	The Forbidden Love EP	
"That's Incentive"	1997	You Can Play These Songs with Chords	
"The Employment Pages"	2000	We Have the Facts and We're Voting Yes	
"The Face That Launched 1000 Shits" ‡	1998	Something About Airplanes	
"The Ghosts of Beverly Drive" †	2015	Kintsugi	
"The Ice Is Getting Thinner"	2008	Narrow Stairs	
"The New Year" †	2003	Transatlanticism	
"The Sound of Settling" †	2003	Transatlanticism	
"This Charming Man" ‡	1997	You Can Play These Songs with Chords	
"This Temporary Life"	2004	Future Soundtrack for America	
"Tiny Vessels"	2003	Transatlanticism	
"Title and Registration" †	2003	Transatlanticism	
"Title Track"	2000	We Have the Facts and We're Voting Yes	
"To the Ground"	2019	The Blue EP	
"Tomorrow"	1997	You Can Play These Songs with Chords	
"Tractor Rape Chain" ‡	2016	"Tractor Rape Chain / Black Sun"	
"Transatlanticism"	2003	Transatlanticism	
"TV Trays"	1997	You Can Play These Songs with Chords	
"Two Cars"	1997	You Can Play These Songs with Chords	
"Underneath the Sycamore" †	2011	Codes and Keys	
"Underwater!" †	2000	Non-album single	
"Unobstructed Views"	2011	Codes and Keys	
"Wait" ‡	1997	You Can Play These Songs with Chords	
"Waiting For The Sunrise" †	2022	Waiting For The Sunrise	
"We Laugh Indoors" †	2001	The Photo Album	
"We Looked Like Giants"	2003	Transatlanticism	
"What Sarah Said"	2005	Plans	
"Wheat Like Waves"	2022	Asphalt Meadows	
"When We Drive" †	2018	Thank You for Today	
"Why You'd Want to Live Here"	2001	The Photo Album	
"World Shut Your Mouth" ‡	2006	"Crooked Teeth"	
"You Are a Tourist" †	2011	Codes and Keys	
"You Can Do Better Than Me"	2008	Narrow Stairs	
"You Moved Away"	2018	Thank You for Today	
"You've Haunted Me All My Life"	2015	Kintsugi	
"Your Bruise" †	1998	Something About Airplanes	
"Your Heart Is an Empty Room"	2005	Plans	
"Your Hurricane"	2018	Thank You for Today	
"Your New Twin Sized Bed"	2008	Narrow Stairs	
