= Photo booth (disambiguation) =

A photo booth is a vending machine or kiosk which contains an automated camera and film processor.

Photo booth may also refer to:

- Photo Booth, a small software application for taking photos with an iSight camera by Apple Computer for Mac OS X and later, iPadOS
- "Photobooth", a song by Death Cab for Cutie from their 2000 The Forbidden Love EP
- Photo Booth: A Graphic Novel, 2010
