= Michael Schorr =

American drummer

- Occupations: Drummer, Video Game Designer
- Website: https://michaelschorr.com/music

Michael Schorr is a video game designer and the former drummer of Death Cab for Cutie with whom he recorded The Photo Album and two of their EPs The Forbidden Love E.P. and The Stability E.P.

== Career ==
=== Drummer ===
Schorr is the former drummer of such bands as Death Cab for Cutie, Sin Taxi, and FotoForm.

=== Video Game Designer ===
In addition to music, Schorr is part of the video game industry. He worked for Wargaming Seattle for four years, before it shutdown in 2018.

As of 2023, He works at 343 industries as Forge Lead Designer for Halo Infinite.
