= The Line of Best Fit =

Online music magazine

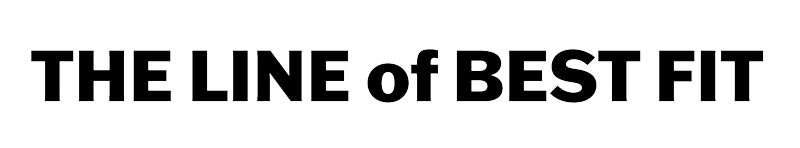
- Website type: Online magazine
- Available in: English
- Creator: Richard Thane
- Editor: Paul Bridgewater
- Website: thelineofbestfit.com
- Launched: 2007; 19 years ago
- Current status: Active
- ISSN: 2754-7469

The Line of Best Fit is an independent online magazine based in London, concentrating on new music.

== Content ==
It publishes independent music reviews, features, interview, and media. Founded by Richard Thane in February 2007 and currently edited by Paul Bridgewater, the webzine's name derives from a song on Death Cab for Cutie's You Can Play These Songs with Chords.

== Coverage ==
Album reviews by the webzine are used for music review aggregate sites AnyDecentMusic? and Metacritic. The Line of Best Fit also publishes music premieres, exclusive live performances, podcasts, and playlists.

The webzine has its own record label, Best Fit Recordings, and since 2015, has hosted its own annual music festival in London, the Five Day Forecast. It also presents a stage at SXSW.
