= Codes and Keys =

Studio album by Death Cab for Cutie
- Released: May 31, 2011
- Recorded: 2010
- Studios: Sound City, Van Nuys; The Warehouse, Vancouver; London Bridge, Seattle; Two Sticks Audio, Seattle; Tiny Telephone, San Francisco; Bright Street Recorders, North Hollywood; Jackpot! Recording, Portland; Avast Recording, Seattle
- Genres: Indie pop; alternative rock; indie rock
- Length: 45:04
- Labels: Atlantic; Barsuk
- Producer: Chris Walla

Death Cab for Cutie chronology
The Open Door EP (2009)	Codes and Keys (2011)	Kintsugi (2015)

Singles from Codes and Keys
- 1. "You Are a Tourist" Released: March 29, 2011; 2. "Home Is a Fire" Released: April 20, 2011; 3. "Stay Young, Go Dancing" Released: September 26, 2011; 4. "Underneath the Sycamore" Released: January 10, 2012

Codes and Keys is the seventh studio album by Death Cab for Cutie, released on May 31, 2011. Ben Gibbard and Nick Harmer have both been quoted as saying that the album will be "a much less guitar-centric album than we've ever made before". The first single, "You Are a Tourist", was made available for online stream on March 28, 2011 on the band's official site and the album was available for streaming in its entirety on May 23, 2011 on NPR. The album debuted at No. 3 on the Billboard 200, with 102,000 copies sold in its first week. It has sold 283,000 copies in the US as of March 2015. On November 30, 2011, the album received a nomination at the 54th Grammy Awards for Best Alternative Music Album.

== Recording and production ==
Influenced by the album Another Green World by Brian Eno, Codes and Keys was recorded in eight different studios, using Logic Pro software. The band would record in each studio for no longer than two weeks, with vocalist and guitarist Benjamin Gibbard noting, "We're all moving into a period in our lives where family is very important. So living off in the woods for a month away from family isn't something we want to do. On this record I've written a couple songs in our downtime between studios and we start recording that brand new song on the first day of the next session, which is something we've never really had the opportunity to do before."

During its recording, Gibbard stated: "It's not a guitar-based record. We've been into vintage keyboards and playing with that palette. We're not adding guitars because people will be expecting them. I'm so proud of this album that at this point I don't care if people don't like it." Guitarist and producer Chris Walla elaborated further, "We're thirteen or fourteen years, and seven or eight albums – depending how you count – into this, and it just seemed like a good time to not make a really guitar-centric, guitar-focused record." Walla later stated: "guitar is great; it's a really immediate, impulsive sort of instrument. But I think if we had strapped on guitars and gone into the studio with the intent of making a sort of live-ish sounding record, we definitely would've retreaded some of the territory that we were in for Narrow Stairs. None of us really wanted to do that, but it took us a little while to figure out how to do it differently; how to find something that would work."

Walla's production was influenced by Dazzle Ships by OMD, This Is Happening by LCD Soundsystem, New Order, and the David Bowie album, Low, with Walla noting, "They really lean on a particularly technological bent. I wanted to do that. I wanted less photograph, more impressionism." Walla elaborated, "[Codes and Keys] was an exercise in using an entirely different tool set. [...] the whole record ended up being this big experiment, which was really exciting. [...] We were really happy with Narrow Stairs, but we could make a record like that in our sleep. It's just so second-nature and so simple. I still think there's a lot more to explore [in] the way we made this record. And I think we'll probably continue on a similar trajectory and see where we end up on the next album."

The album was mixed by Alan Moulder, with Walla noting: "I've mixed [all of the band's previous albums] except for this one. I'd been toying with it for a couple of records now. [...] It was really just a matter of trying to find the right person for this, to mix a Death Cab record, and Alan was my first choice. I was thrilled that he was able to do it. I'd been a huge fan of his for years and years so it was super exciting to get to work with him. He's kind of one of my heroes, he's made a bunch of my favorite records, so it was awesome."

== Writing and composition ==
Lyricist Benjamin Gibbard stated that the album's lyrical content and themes differ from their previous studio album, Narrow Stairs (2008): "There's a level of self-loathing in Narrow Stairs that I'm a bit of embarrassed about now. It's a really dark record. I didn't want to make that record again. I didn't want to write those songs again." As to the influence his marriage to Zooey Deschanel had on the new album, he noted: "Everything I write is reflective of my own life and the lives of those people around me. They reflect the conversations you have and the rumblings of life around you. But when somebody gets married, people assume that they're going to get a certain thing out of an album." Gibbard later stated, however: "I would be remiss if I tried to continue writing in a solely melancholic voice, given the fact that now I'm a married man." Five months after the release of the album, Gibbard and Deschanel announced their divorce.

With Codes and Keys, the experimental side of the band was drawn out more through production than a set songwriting process. Nicholas Harmer stated: "The making of this album was a little more open-ended as far as submitting different ideas if there were openings or holes for ideas to be submitted, but I think a lot of the experimentation came from the production side more than it did from the writing side."

According to Gibbard, guitarist and producer Chris Walla's writing contributions were key during the album's writing and recording: "There are a few songs that Chris wrote all the music for. I cut and pasted and wrote lyrics and arrangements for them. This is the first time that we've had multiple compositions that started with Chris's demos and not mine, which is exciting." Gibbard continued to praise Walla's contributions, stating: "I'm down with Chris screwing around with what he wants to do. He's yet to lead us down the wrong path. I think we're constantly trying to reinvent the band without losing sight of who we are. I don't feel like we went all Kid A on everyone. But there are moments on this record where we looked at each other and said, 'Oh, man, fans of The Photo Album (2001) are going to wonder what's going on here.'"

Walla commented on writing contributions, stating: "If I'm starting something from the ground up, either I've got a melody in my head or I've got a feeling that I'm chasing. It'll be something impressionistic; it'll be like trying to take a feeling or something that's happening environmentally and trying to bottle that and turn it into a piece of music. Both the things that I started as instrumentals for this record were written largely out of a place of procrastination. I think I was supposed to be mixing someone else's record, or something, but I had some idea that I couldn't get out of my head and I just needed to crash through it."

== Reception ==
Professional ratings
Aggregate scores
Source	Rating
Metacritic	71/100
Review scores
Source	Rating
AllMusic	4/5 stars
Entertainment Weekly	A
The Guardian	3/5 stars
NME	7/10
Pitchfork	5.0/10
PopMatters	4/10
Rolling Stone	3.5/5 stars
Spin	8/10
Slant Magazine	3/5 stars
USA Today	3.5/4 stars

Codes and Keys has received generally positive reviews. On the review aggregate site Metacritic, the album has a score of 71 out of 100, indicating "generally favorable reviews". Entertainment Weekly's Kyle Anderson gave the album a very positive review, writing "It's a reminder to the rest of the pretty-rock community that loveliness is worthless if there's no heart behind it, and Death Cab's beats stronger than most." Jon Pareles of The New York Times also gave the album a positive review, calling Codes and Keys a better album than the band's previous album Narrow Stairs. Pareles concluded his review with: "This album doesn't try to rejuvenate Death Cab for Cutie by reverting to the sound the band had in the late 1990s. Now, it's a band of grown-ups still eager to evolve." BBC Music's Ian Winwood called the album "an understated and subtly magnificent pleasure." Even more reviews are positive: AbsolutePunk gave it a score of 95%, saying, "As the record comes to a close, it's impossible not to note the true creativity exerted throughout the entirety of Codes and Keys." Paste gave it a score of 8.3 out of ten and said that "If Codes and Keys started at track 7 and kept the momentum going, it could be a great record. Instead it's a good one with great moments from a band that's clearly getting better with age." Billboard gave it a favorable review and stated, "Past Death Cab albums have found frontman Ben Gibbard penning youthful lyrics about the wariness and mystery of love, but now, the singer -- who recently married actress/musician Zooey Deschanel -- seems to finally be at peace with his strange, wonderful self."

Q gave it four stars out of five and said that "Perhaps [the album's] seemingly illogical sequencing of songs makes sense if they wish to lure their audience into thinking it's as-you-were. But it's not: things are different and better." Rock Sound gave it eight out of ten and said, "Throw in the stunning power and clarity of Alan Moulder's mix and you have the sound of a band revitalised, re-inspired and highly evolved." CMJ gave it a favorable review and stated: "That's the type of music that the band knocks out of the park: music for lovers to do romantic things to. On Codes And Keys, those lovers are encouraged to be happy--an emotion that sometimes has evaded Death Cab." The Independent gave it four stars out of five and said, "There's an ease and comfort about the songs that suggests they fell into place naturally, rather than suffering endless alterations; and the band seem content to let them breathe and take on a life of their own, rather than freight them with unnecessary adornment." American Songwriter also gave it four stars out of five and said that "Underneath slicker production and diminished guitar usage are the same melodies and introspective, angsty songwriting, only this time the band may come off as occasionally happy." Alternative Press likewise gave it four stars out of five and called it a "quietly experimental album" that "ends up being Death Cab For Cutie's great leap forward--an achievement of pop formalism wrapped inside a beautiful cacophony." Filter gave it a score of 80% and said that "Perhaps the charm of Codes and Keys stems from the clever recycling of tropes-both musical and thematic."

The A.V. Club gave it a B and said, "Longtime Death Cab fans may chafe at the record's brighter moments, but it's a more rewarding experience than the band's previous stab at a "pop" record, 2005's Plans." Chicago Tribune gave it three stars out of five and said that the album "pulses with the sound of tires on pavement, life blurring past a bus window on the road." The Independent's Sunday Edition gave it a positive review and called it "the closest thing yet to a follow-up to Give Up by Gibbard's other concern, the Postal Service, although it's more about pretty pianos than effervescent synths." The Boston Globe gave it a positive review and said that "there's little guitar to speak of, resulting in a more docile affair, even by the band's already mellow standards." Under the Radar gave it a score of seven stars out of ten and said that "one listen ... reveals a band conscious as ever of the power of the studio." Beats Per Minute gave it a score of 66% and stated, "The end result is an unfortunate fact that while Death Cab For Cutie seems as capable as ever at expressing themselves, they are running out of things to say. Or, at least, things worth hearing." Los Angeles Times gave it two-and-a-half stars out of four and said that "Gibbard's picked up a bit of L.A.'s sun-scarred optimism and a droll domestic satisfaction that's alternately smug and insightful."

Other reviews are very average or mixed: Sputnikmusic gave the album a score of three out of five, stating that "Until Gibbard can harness this newfound happiness with the kind of lyrical flair his fans are used to, Death Cab remain in danger of being, well, just another indie band." Kerrang! also gave it three stars out of five and said that "not everything works quite as well" as the opening and final tracks. Drowned in Sound gave it a score of six out of ten and said that "Despite an abundance of textures Codes and Keys seems somehow sparse, empty calories around a hollow centre." Consequence of Sound gave it three stars out of five and said that while the album "is a pleasing listen, it ultimately does lack the depth to make it really memorable, and some of the sacrifices made to create its poppy aesthetic are terribly unfortunate." In April 2015, Consequence of Sound published an article that revisited the album, in light of Gibbard's divorce from Deschanel, which was announced five months after the album was released. The article noted that "[w]hen viewed as a pre-divorce record, the band's seventh album becomes a masterpiece", and "it's not just sadness and honesty that make Codes and Keys a better album than most folks give it credit for – it's the duality, the clashing sense of trying so hard to keep something together and ultimately failing".

Larry Fitzmaurice of Pitchfork Media, on the other hand, gave Codes and Keys a mixed review, calling the album "chilly, diffident, and emotionally distant." Fitzmaurice also compared the album negatively to Death Cab for Cutie's earlier work, writing "...even when the band revisits past glories on Codes and Keys' few highlights, Death Cab weirdly sound like they are imitating themselves." No Ripcord gave it a score of five stars out of ten and said that "Despite the occasional flashes of brilliance, Codes and Keys often feels like a half assed attempt at innovation." PopMatters' Evan Sawdey gave the album a very negative review, writing, "this is the sound of Death Cab at their most generic, disjointed, and disinterested. It's a hard pill to swallow, but the truth is this: Codes & Keys is the worst album of their career." Tiny Mix Tapes gave it two stars out of five and said the album was "littered with PDA for Gibbard's new celebrity wife Zooey Deschanel, but this especially garish monument to his muse would have been better placed on one of her She & Him album-wafers." Later on, The Phoenix gave its remix album, Keys and Codes, two stars out of four and said that it "feels slapped together, which is disappointing when you consider the array of talent present."

== Legacy ==
Gibbard has since looked back at Codes and Keys with divided feelings. In a piece for Vice titled "Rank Your Records", he placed Codes and Keys lowest. He remembered that during the album's production he had moved to Los Angeles, which was far from his home of Seattle. "Because of the company I was keeping in Los Angeles, I was becoming very closed off, personally," he said. "I found myself not wanting to share as much of myself that I had historically shared on records." He also noted that he had switched from Fender Bullets to Fender G&Ls—a guitar he deemed "wonderful" but one he felt had too wide a neck for him to play comfortably. When asked in another interview what songs he would be uninterested in performing again, he remarked, "Yeah, pretty much all of Codes and Keys!" During a live performance from home in 2020, Gibbard reiterated he felt 'detached' from his Seattle-based community while living in Los Angeles, but stated there were songs on the record he thought were 'really good' and that he maybe unfairly associated the record with that period of time.

Ed Power of The Irish Times called the album "one of the least-beloved among Death Cab fans," while writer Dan Caffrey of Consequence of Sound noted it as the band's "worst-reviewed record at the time." Caffrey defended the LP, dubbing the album a "masterpiece". Other publications have had mixed retrospective thoughts about Codes and Keys. Stereogum named it their worst album, saying on Codes And Keys, the quartet "seemed they were beginning to suffer from exhaustion...What the album really sounds like is Death Cab implementing bits of previous recordings through the lens of a failed experiment."

== Track listing ==
All tracks are written by Ben Gibbard, except where noted.

No.	Title	Music	Length
1.	"Home Is a Fire"	Gibbard, Chris Walla	4:04
2.	"Codes and Keys"		3:22
3.	"Some Boys"		3:11
4.	"Doors Unlocked and Open"		5:37
5.	"You Are a Tourist"		4:47
6.	"Unobstructed Views"	Gibbard, Walla	6:11
7.	"Monday Morning"		4:19
8.	"Portable Television"		2:53
9.	"Underneath the Sycamore"	Gibbard, Walla	3:27
10.	"St. Peter's Cathedral"		4:30
11.	"Stay Young, Go Dancing"		2:50

Deluxe/Japanese edition bonus tracks
No.	Title	Length
12.	"Portable Television" (demo version)	2:55
13.	"Some Boys" (demo version)	3:25
14.	"You Are a Tourist" (music video)	5:06

== Personnel ==
The following people contributed to Codes and Keys:

Death Cab for Cutie

- Benjamin Gibbard – lead vocals, guitar, piano, keyboards
- Nicholas Harmer – bass guitar, guitar, backing vocals
- Jason McGerr – drums, percussion
- Chris Walla – guitar, backing vocals, piano, keyboards

Additional musicians

- Magik*Magik Orchestra – strings ("Codes and Keys", "Stay Young, Go Dancing")
- Minna Choi – arrangements, conducting
- Krish Lingala – oboe, theremin

Artwork

- Nick Harmer – front cover, "coin slot" photograph
- Storey Elementary – additional photography and design

Recording

- Chris Walla – producer, recording, mixing ("Home is a Fire", "Codes and Keys")
- Beau Sorenson – recording, mixing ("Codes and Keys")
- Alan Moulder – mixing
- Roger Siebel – mastering
- Sean Oakley – recording assistant (Sound City)
- Dave "Squirrel" Covell – recording assistant (Sound City)
- Sally Pickett – recording assistant (Sound City)
- Mark Richards – recording assistant (Sound City)
- Adam Greenholtz – recording assistant (The Warehouse)
- Ryan Enockson – recording assistant (The Warehouse)
- Stephen Hogan – recording assistant (London Bridge)
- Jackson Long – recording assistant (Two Sticks Audio)
- John Vanderslice – recording assistant (Tiny Telephone)
- Jay Pellicci – recording assistant (Tiny Telephone)
- Pierre de Reeder – recording assistant (Bright Street Recorders)
- Kendra Lynn – recording assistant (Jackpot! Recording)
- Stuart Hallerman – recording assistant (Avast Recording)
- Johnny Mendoza – recording assistant (Avast Recording)
- Cathy Ferrante – recording assistant (Avast Recording)
- Catherine Marks – mixing assistant
- John Catlin – mixing assistant

== Charts ==
=== Weekly charts ===
Chart (2011)	Peak position
Australian Albums (ARIA)	7
Austrian Albums (Ö3 Austria)	73
Belgian Albums (Ultratop Flanders)	59
Canadian Albums (Billboard)	3
Danish Albums (Hitlisten)	37
Dutch Albums (Album Top 100)	74
German Albums (Offizielle Top 100)	47
Irish Albums (IRMA)	23
New Zealand Albums (RMNZ)	21
Norwegian Albums (VG-lista)	24
Scottish Albums (Official Charts)	24
Spanish Albums (Promusicae)	64
Swedish Albums (Sverigetopplistan)	46
Swiss Albums (Schweizer Hitparade)	59
UK Albums (Official Charts)	24
US Billboard 200	3
US Top Rock Albums (Billboard)	1

=== Year-end charts ===
Chart (2011)	Position
US Billboard 200	143
US Top Rock Albums (Billboard)	27

=== Singles ===
Year	Song	Peak positions	
Year	Song	US Alt	US Rock
2011	"You Are a Tourist"	1	3
2011	"Home Is a Fire"	—	—
2011	"Stay Young, Go Dancing"	32	43
"—" denotes releases that did not chart.
