= We Laugh Indoors =

Single by Death Cab for Cutie

from the album The Photo Album
- Released: October 29, 2002
- Recorded: Spring 2001
- Genre: Emo; indie rock
- Length: 4:58
- Label: Barsuk, Fierce Panda
- Songwriters: Ben Gibbard, Chris Walla, Nick Harmer
- Producer: Chris Walla

Death Cab for Cutie singles chronology
"I Was a Kaleidoscope" (2002)	"We Laugh Indoors" (2002)	"The New Year" (2003)

"We Laugh Indoors" is a song by American rock band Death Cab for Cutie, the third single from their third album, The Photo Album, released on 29 October 2002.

The single was released on both 7" vinyl and CD. The vinyl release featured "We Laugh Indoors", and a live acoustic version of "Debate Exposes Doubt". The CD release included "We Laugh Indoors", an alternate mix of the song "For What Reason" from Death Cab for Cutie's previous album, We Have the Facts and We're Voting Yes, and a live version of "I Was a Kaleidoscope".

The song reached number 122 on the UK Singles Chart.

== Track listing ==
Vinyl release

1. "We Laugh Indoors (New Mix)" - 4:58
2. "Debate Exposes Doubt" (Acoustic SBN Session Track. Recorded In London 28/01/02)

CD release

1. "We Laugh Indoors" (New mix) – 4:58
2. "For What Reason" (Alternate mix) – 3:43
3. "I Was a Kaleidoscope" (Live) – 2:54

== Charts ==
Chart (2002)	Peak position
UK Singles (OCC)	122
