= The Stability EP =

EP by Death Cab for Cutie
- Released: February 19, 2002
- Genre: Indie rock
- Label: Barsuk Records

Death Cab for Cutie chronology
The Photo Album (2001)	The Stability EP (2002)	Transatlanticism (2003)

Death Cab for Cutie singles chronology
"Prove My Hypotheses" (1999)	"Stability" (2002)	"A Movie Script Ending" (2002)

Professional ratings
Review scores
Source	Rating
Pitchfork Media	6.9/10 link
PopMatters	(unfavorable) link
Robert Christgau	link
The Rolling Stone Album Guide	link

The Stability EP is a limited edition EP by Indie rock band Death Cab for Cutie, released February 19, 2002. The release marks the final appearance of drummer Michael Schorr.

The tracks on The Stability EP were originally featured as bonus tracks on the limited edition and Japanese versions of The Photo Album.

== Song information ==
"Stability" reappears as the closing track to the band's 2005 major label debut, Plans. The new recording is considerably shorter than the original twelve-minute, mostly instrumental version found on this EP, ending where the vocals end. The version included on Plans is titled "Stable Song". A live rehearsal version of "Stability" can be found on the DVD Drive Well, Sleep Carefully, which clocks in at 10:03.

The track "All Is Full of Love" is a Björk cover.

== Track listing ==
No.	Title	Writer(s)	Length
1.	"20th Century Towers"	Ben Gibbard, Nick Harmer, Christopher Walla	4:36
2.	"All Is Full of Love"	Björk Guðmundsdóttir	3:17
3.	"Stability"	Gibbard, Walla	12:21

== Personnel ==
- Ben Gibbard – lead vocals, guitar, piano, choir on "20th Century Towers"
- Nick Harmer – bass, Juno on "All Is Full of Love", choir on "20th Century Towers"
- Michael Schorr – drums, choir on "20th Century Towers"
- Christopher Walla – guitar, choir on "20th Century Towers", production, recording, mixing
- James Mendenhall – outro piano on "Stability"
- John Vanderslice – additional vocals, Juno on "Stability"
- Jeff Saltzman – mastering
- S.E. Sharma at Avast! – mixing on "All Is Full of Love"
