= You Are a Tourist =

Single by Death Cab for Cutie

from the album Codes and Keys
- Released: March 28, 2011
- Genre: Alternative rock; indie rock
- Length: 4:46
- Label: Atlantic
- Songwriter: Ben Gibbard
- Producer: Chris Walla

Death Cab for Cutie singles chronology
"Meet Me on the Equinox" (2009)	"You Are a Tourist" (2011)	"Home Is a Fire" (2011)

"You Are a Tourist" is a song by American rock band Death Cab for Cutie, the first single from their seventh album Codes and Keys, released on March 28, 2011.

The single topped the US Billboard Alternative Songs, Adult Alternative Songs, and Bubbling Under Hot 100 Singles charts, as well as reaching number three on the US Billboard Rock Songs chart. "You Are a Tourist" is Death Cab for Cutie's first number one alternative hit, and their highest charting single on the US alternative chart along with fellow chart-topper "Here to Forever".

== Background ==
The song's transient lyrical themes were shaped in part by frontman Ben Gibbard's upbringing and lifestyle as a touring musician. Gibbard, whose father served in the U.S. Navy, spent much of his childhood moving frequently, an experience that left him with a fluid and sometimes uncertain sense of home.

The song's original demo contained a sample from Orchestral Manoeuvres in the Dark's Dazzle Ships (1983), and was shared online by Gibbard via SoundCloud in 2016. The song was developed late in the recording process for Codes and Keys, after much of the album had been completed. The band immediately took to the song, and knew quickly it would be the album's lead single. Gibbard called the verses of the tune catchy, light affirmations that are expanded upon in the bridge, which encourages the listener to relocate: "If you feel just like a tourist/ In the city you were born/ Then it’s time to go/ And define your destination/ There’s so many different places to call home".

== Release and reception ==
The song debuted on Seattle radio station 107.7 The End on March 28, 2011, and was available for digital download the following day. The band performed the song live on VH1 Storytellers on May 27, 2011.

Billboard reviewer Ryan Reed said the track "crackles with psychedelic sunshine. Strands of reversed noise bubble under drummer Jason McGerr's impeccable time-keeping, and an army of effects-smeared guitar overdubs wiggle together in an irresistible groove." Larry Fitzmaurice at Pitchfork felt the song sounded like a "generic version of the band from an earlier era." David Malitz of The Washington Post considered the sentiment of the tune "nothing new, but at least it sounds fresh."

== Music video ==
The official music video for "You Are a Tourist" was filmed live, and streamed online on April 5, 2011. The clip was shot on a soundstage at 204 Studios in Hollywood, California. The idea for the video stemmed from the band's longtime collaborator, Aaron Stewart-Ahn. According to the band, "You Are a Tourist" was the first ever live, scripted, one-take music video shoot. Though previous videos had been filmed live, "You Are a Tourist" utilizes complicated choreography and camera moves. The video was directed by Tim Nackashi and accomplished in one take, using multiple cameras, and no edits or re-takes. The production employed dancers, actors, and projected images.

== Charts ==
=== Weekly charts ===
Chart (2011)	Peak position
Canada Rock (Billboard)	18
Japan (Japan Hot 100)	60
US Bubbling Under Hot 100 (Billboard)	1
US Hot Rock & Alternative Songs (Billboard)	3

=== Year-end charts ===
Chart (2010)	Position
US Hot Rock Songs (Billboard)	16

== Certifications ==
Region	Certification	Certified units/sales
United States (RIAA)	Gold	500,000^{‡}
^{‡} Sales+streaming figures based on certification alone.

== See also ==
- List of number-one Billboard Alternative Songs of 2011
