= Stay Young, Go Dancing =

Single by Death Cab for Cutie

from the album Codes and Keys
- Released: September 26, 2011
- Length: 2:50
- Label: Atlantic
- Songwriter: Ben Gibbard
- Producer: Chris Walla

Death Cab for Cutie singles chronology
"Home Is a Fire" (2011)	"Stay Young, Go Dancing" (2011)	"Underneath the Sycamore" (2012)

Music video
- "Stay Young, Go Dancing" on YouTube

"Stay Young, Go Dancing" is a song recorded by the American rock band Death Cab for Cutie for their seventh studio album, Codes and Keys (2011). It was released as the third single from Codes and Keys on September 26, 2011, through Atlantic Records.

== Background ==
"Stay Young, Go Dancing" is centered on domestic bliss, and was written for Gibbard's wife at the time, actress Zooey Deschanel. In the song, he croons "When she sings, I hear a symphony / And I’m swallowed in sound as it echoes through me." At the time of the song's writing, Gibbard had relocated to Los Angeles, a city he once derided as "the belly of the beast" in the 2001 song "Why You’d Want to Live Here". He repurposes this lyric in the opening lines of "Stay Young, Go Dancing", singing "Life is sweet / in the belly of the beast."

The song was sequenced at the end of the album in response to the band's previous tendency to end on melancholy notes. "As much as I felt really self-conscious about the sentiment of that song because it's so light, I thought, 'Why not just put it at the end?'" Gibbard reasoned. The song contains orchestral accompaniment from the Magik*Magik Orchestra, with whom the band later toured and released a live album with.

== Music video ==
The song's music video documents a couple's relationship throughout life, beginning in their elderly years and ending as young lovers. Chris Coplan at Consequence compared it to the plot of the film The Curious Case of Benjamin Button (2008). The clips are intercut with footage of Gibbard performing the song on acoustic guitar in a forest. In a statement, Gibbard said "With all of these songs that I write, I want them to have as much universal appeal as possible and certainly don't feel like I want to undermine the complexity of the lyrics at times and make that happen."

== Release and reception ==
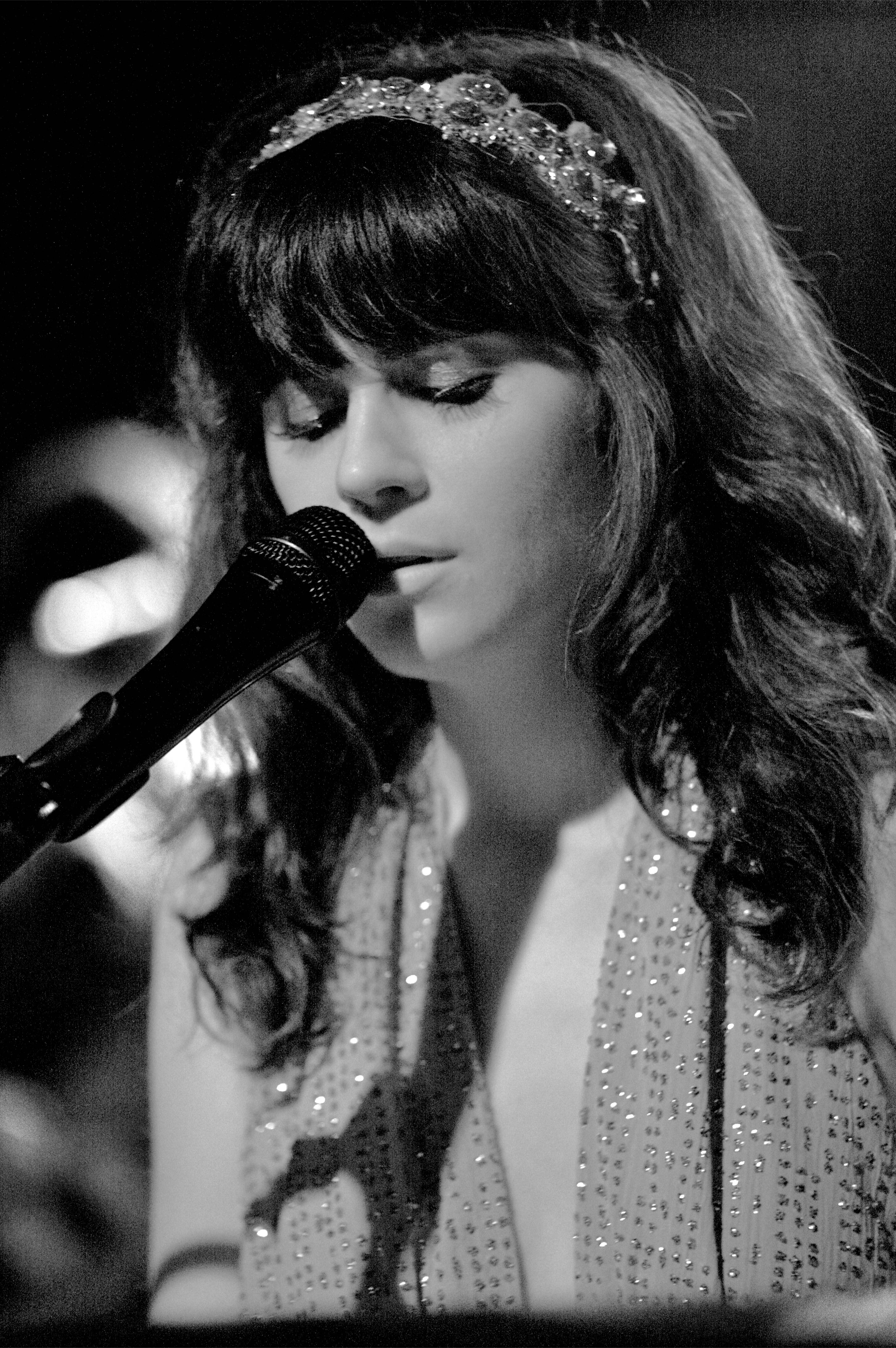
The song was written for Gibbard's then-wife Zooey Deschanel.

The band first announced the song would be their next single on August 1, 2011. The band promoted the song with a performance on Late Show with David Letterman on September 29, 2011.

"Stay Young, Go Dancing" received positive reviews from contemporary music critics. Jon Pareles at the New York Times called it "a folky, guitar-strumming waltz that goes orchestral." August Brown at the Los Angeles Times considered it limp, writing that Gibbard's "barbed wit can feel unattractive coupled with themes of finding bliss." Jillian Mapes at Billboard considered it evocative of the Canadian band Stars. Alexis Petridis from The Guardian said the song "[packs] an effortless Elliott Smith-like melody that just sweeps the listener along." Larry Fitzmaurice at Pitchfork called it a "moony-eyed closing hymn" in which his vocals are clear and present, unlike many other spots on the record. Some reviewers have examined it in the aftermath of Gibbard's divorce from Deschanel. Dan Caffrey from Consequence called the song perhaps overly sentimental, perhaps in retrospect reading "supremely sad yet honest." A decade on, Tony DeGenaro at PopMatters opined that the song, "in its melodramatic, over the top joyousness, [is] still deserving of some light ribbing."

== Charts ==
Chart performance for "Stay Young, Go Dancing"
Chart (2011)	Peak position
US Adult Alternative Airplay (Billboard)	11
US Hot Rock & Alternative Songs (Billboard)	40
Belgium (Ultratop 50 Wallonia)	126
