= Photo Booth: A Graphic Novel =

2010 graphic novel

Photo Booth: A Graphic Novel is a single story graphic novel created by writer Lewis Helfand, artist Sachin Nagar, colourist Prince Varghese, and editors Mark Jones and Aditi Ray. The book was published by Campfire Graphic Novels in November 2010.

== Background ==
Photo Booth originated when Lewis Helfand, a prolific writer, approached Campfire Graphic Novels with the idea of an Indian romance story set within New York. The plot contains two time zones, one of which is set within 2010 and another set in the year 1990. This method of flashback is in keeping with a popular style of story telling used within the Indian epic known as The Mahabharata. The idea of using Indian characters within a foreign setting is also in keeping with trends in popular Bollywood films such as Chandni Chowk to China and Kismat Konnection. According to Lewis Helfand, the graphic novel format is just as potent as cinema and music: "Graphic novels are just a different medium, a different way of telling a story. Just like you can get lost in a great song or film, graphic novels can capture your imagination in the same way."

== Plot ==
The opening section of Photo Booth focuses on Praveer Rajani, an Interpol agent who is investigating a new deadly drug flooding the streets of New York City. Through a narrative, the reader is told of Rajani's concerns: that he feels lost, and often wonders if he has chosen the right path in life.

== Themes ==
Within the opening scenes, there are visual symbols connected with the Upanishads: philosophical texts considered to be an early source of Hindu religion. Such symbols are arrows and lightning.

Throughout Photo Booth, there is a concentration on key areas that concern Hinduism such as dharma. Within the dual stories of the graphic novel, there is a concentration on Praveer Rajani's dharma in terms of his devotion to his career and family. Praveer must ultimately make a decision as to where his obligation must lie: with his family, or a vendetta that is consuming his life. The idea of ahimsa, a principal belief of Hinduism, is also addressed within the story. Although consumed with anger and violence, Praveer Rajani will try to obey the idea of nonviolence in resolving an issue from his past. Ahimsa (translated as meaning to do no harm, or avoiding violence), was promoted by the political and ideological leader of India, Mohandas Karamchand Gandhi.

== Release ==
Photo Booth was released within the United Kingdom on 1 November 2010, and was scheduled to be released in the United States on 21 June 2011.

== Reception ==
Kirkus Reviews gave Photo Booth a mixed review, praising the premise but criticizing the plot's disjointed execution and lack of cohesion. Publishers Weekly gave a similar review, stating that the story "lacks either logic or a satisfying arc", but praising Nagar's art.
