= I Was a Kaleidoscope =

Single by Death Cab for Cutie

from the album The Photo Album
- Released: October 15, 2002
- Recorded: Spring 2001
- Genre: Indie rock
- Length: 2:50
- Label: Fierce Panda
- Songwriter(s): Ben Gibbard, Chris Walla
- Producer(s): Chris Walla

Death Cab for Cutie singles chronology
"A Movie Script Ending" (2002)	"I Was a Kaleidoscope" (2002)	"We Laugh Indoors" (2002)

"I Was a Kaleidoscope" is a song by American indie rock band Death Cab for Cutie, the second single from their third album The Photo Album, released on 15 October 2002.

It is an upbeat song consisting of guitars and drums, with keyboards and loops completing the soundscape that the band builds up with the initial guitar riff and drum and bass line. It was written about walking to a soon to be ex-girlfriend's apartment in winter, probably referencing weather around Seattle and Bellingham, Washington, the band's hometowns.

The song reached number 115 on the UK Singles Chart.

== Track listing ==
1. "I Was a Kaleidoscope"
2. "Coney Island" (Alternate)

== Charts ==
Chart (2002)	Peak position
UK Singles (OCC)	115
