= A Movie Script Ending =

Single by Death Cab for Cutie

from the album The Photo Album
- Released: February 8, 2002
- Recorded: Spring 2001
- Genre: Indie rock; emo
- Length: 4:18
- Label: Barsuk; Fierce Panda
- Songwriter: Ben Gibbard
- Producer: Chris Walla

Death Cab for Cutie singles chronology
"Stability" (2002)	"A Movie Script Ending" (2002)	"I Was a Kaleidoscope" (2002)

"A Movie Script Ending" is a song recorded by the American rock band Death Cab for Cutie for their third studio album, The Photo Album (2001). It was released as the lead single from The Photo Album on February 8, 2002 through Barsuk Records.

== Background ==
"A Movie Script Ending" was written by frontman Ben Gibbard shortly after he moved to Seattle from the band's hometown of Bellingham, Washington. He found himself nostalgic for the simpler times the group had in the quieter college town. The song's lyrics features numerous references to Bellingham; examples include "the air on Railroad" and "the shopfronts on Holly," Railroad and Holly being two intersecting streets in downtown Bellingham. The song also refers to The Beaver Inn with the line: "We peered through the windows, new bottoms on barstools but the people remain the same, with prices inflating." The song's arrangement has evolved in the years since its release, at least when played live by the group: typically, live renditions tend to be slightly faster. A band demo of the song was later included on the twentieth anniversary reissue of The Photo Album in 2021.

== Music video ==
The song's music video was directed by Josh Melnick and Xander Charity. "A Movie Script Ending" was the band's second music video; it was preceded by an obscure home-made clip for "I Was A Kaleidoscope". Ian Cohen extolled the video in a review for Uproxx, calling it "a monumentally sad visual [...] the simplest video they’ve ever made and the only one that actually enhanced its underlying narrative."

== Release ==
"A Movie Script Ending" was released through the band's overseas distributor Fierce Panda in the United Kingdom. It became a fan favorite quickly, garnering airplay and becoming the band's song to chart, reaching number 123 on the UK Singles Chart. Gibbard has called it one of his personal favorite songs by the band.

It was the first of three songs by the band to be included on the television show The O.C., appearing in the episode "The Escape". Representatives from Fox Broadcasting Company contacted Barsuk head Josh Rosenfield to license the track. "We were just blown away. 'Somebody’s licensing one of our songs, and they’re gonna pay us real money?'" Gibbard remembered. The band also supplied an acoustic rendition of the song for the 2004 film Wicker Park.

== Reception ==
Pitchfork Media writer Joe Tangari considered it a logical extension of their previous work, complimenting its "spacious drumming, intertwining guitar arpeggios and Gibbard's impassioned tenor." Stereogum columnist Chris DeVille wrote that "Rarely have Death Cab been more potent than on 'A Movie Script Ending'."

The song was ranked #333 in Pitchfork's Top 500 Tracks of the 2000s.

== Charts ==
Chart (2002)	Peak position
UK Singles (OCC)	123
