= Something About Airplanes =

Studio album by Death Cab for Cutie
- Released: August 18, 1998
- Recorded: 1998
- Studio: Hall of Justice
- Genres: Indie rock; indie pop; emo
- Length: 43:18
- Labels: Barsuk, Elsinor Records
- Producer: Chris Walla

Death Cab for Cutie chronology
You Can Play These Songs with Chords (1997)	Something About Airplanes (1998)	We Have the Facts and We're Voting Yes (2000)

Something About Airplanes is the debut studio album by American indie rock band Death Cab for Cutie, released August 18, 1998, on Barsuk Records. A tenth-anniversary edition of the album was released November 25, 2008, featuring redesigned artwork, liner notes by Sean Nelson, and a bonus disc including the band's first ever Seattle performance at the Crocodile Cafe in February 1998.

Early recordings of five songs from the album can be found on the You Can Play These Songs with Chords compilation.

== Background ==
Airplanes was created at the group's rented house off of Ellis Street in Bellingham. It was recorded on a reel-to-reel eight-track recorder. With Walla's bedroom in the attic, the band inserted a microphone through a hole in the floor to the living room where vocals were tracked. Gibbard's writing was primarily influenced by Idaho indie rockers Built to Spill; in an interview with Vice, he noted that Perfect from Now On, the band's 1997 opus, was "the only thing I was listening to at that point." He continued: "There’s some flagrant Built to Spill ripoffs on that record. I was really influenced by Rex and Bedhead and a lot of these slower kinds of bands."

Airplanes was released through Barsuk and Elsinor Records, the label that issued the group's debut cassette, You Can Play These Songs with Chords. They pressed an initial 1,000 copies of Airplanes, which Gibbard found confounding: "We were imagining we were going to be carrying around boxes of our own records for the rest of our lives," he joked. For the album's decade anniversary, Barsuk released an expanded edition of the LP, coupling it with a live concert the band performed at the Crocodile Cafe in 1998.

== Composition ==
At the time of the album's writing, Gibbard was just coming into his own as a songwriter. He had hoped to pen lyrics he considered "wildly descriptive and very dense and interesting," but later felt its purported profundity reads as nonsensical. Likewise, his singing voice is slightly different than on later recordings, with an adenoidal nasal tone.

"The Face That Launched 1000 Shits" is a cover of an original song by The Revolutionary Hydra, a band that DCFC guitarist Chris Walla and lead singer/guitarist Ben Gibbard belonged to. The song was written by then-bandmate Jay Chilcote. The song’s title is a play on the phrase “The Face That Launched a Thousand Ships”, attributed to Helen of Troy whose supposed unmatched beauty led to the Trojan War (after Paris, Prince of Troy, kidnapped her from Sparta and her husband King Menelaus).

== Artwork ==
Despite the title referring to airplanes, the image on the album cover is of a rowboat. The image is actually seen through a hole in the booklet cover and a sheet of vellum. Like some of the band's 2000 releases, the text is set entirely in lower case.

== Reception ==
Professional ratings
Review scores
Source	Rating
AllMusic	4/5 stars
The Austin Chronicle	2/5 stars
Paste	8.6/10
Pitchfork	8.1/10
PopMatters	7/10
Rolling Stone	3.5/5 stars
The Rolling Stone Album Guide	3/5 stars
Tiny Mix Tapes	3.5/5

An early review of the album from CMJ columnist Glen Sarvady wrote that the album "has the aura of a young band still crafting its own voice, but working fertile ground and already producing some impressive results." Ian Cohen at Pitchfork writes the album "create[s] a sonic blueprint that's subtly innovative [...] Something About Airplanes instead sounds like a private affair, which is one reason it's so treasured amongst diehards." Barry Walters at Rolling Stone writes that "Not every cut on their debut is that assured: Guitarist-producer Chris Walla hadn't yet mastered the studio, and singer Ben Gibbard's articulate moodiness isn't consistently memorable."

Morgan Enos at Billboard launched a celebration of the album for its twentieth anniversary in 2018, writing, "if you want to hear [Death Cab's] sound in chrysalis, you can’t do much better than Airplanes. The album embraces a homespun, basement vibe, but the lyrics prove that Gibbard essentially came out as a perceptive, nuanced writer fully-formed — and with a band that could bring his songs to the light." Similarly, KEXP ran a piece in commemoration, with writer Dusty Henry commenting: "Airplanes [is] such a fascinating and thrilling listen in the Death Cab canon. It's not a benchmark for the band to be measured against. It's a mystery covered in other mysteries [... the] murkiest entry in the band’s catalog. A twisted knot of wobbly guitars and banging drums held together by Gibbard's most obtuse poetry."

== Track listing ==
No.	Title	Writer(s)	Length
1.	"Bend to Squares"	Ben Gibbard, Christopher Walla	4:33
2.	"President of What?"	Gibbard	4:01
3.	"Champagne from a Paper Cup"	Gibbard	2:38
4.	"Your Bruise"	Gibbard, Walla	4:19
5.	"Pictures in an Exhibition"	Gibbard	3:49
6.	"Sleep Spent"	Gibbard, Walla	3:37
7.	"The Face That Launched 1000 Shits"	Jay Chilcote	3:41
8.	"Amputations"	Gibbard	4:54
9.	"Fake Frowns"	Gibbard, Walla	4:30
10.	"Line of Best Fit"	Gibbard	7:16

Reissue bonus disc – Live at the Crocodile Cafe, February 1998
No.	Title	Length
11.	"Your Bruise"
12.	"President of What?"
13.	"Fake Frowns"
14.	"Sweet and Tender Hooligan" (feat. Sean Nelson)
15.	"State Street Residential"
16.	"Amputations"
17.	"Pictures in an Exhibition"

== Personnel ==
Death Cab for Cutie

- Ben Gibbard – vocals, guitar, small piano
- Nathan Good – drums, mixing
- Nick Harmer – bass guitar
- Christopher Walla – guitar, organ, electric piano, things, production, mixing

Additional personnel

- Abi Hall – vocals on "Line of Best Fit"
- Erika Jacobs – writing and cello arrangement on "Bend to Squares" and "The Face That Launched 1000 Shits"
- Tony Lash – mastering

Live at the Crocodile Cafe, February 1998

- Chuck MacIan Robertson – recording
- Sean Nelson – performer on "Sweet and Tender Hooligan"
