= Nathan Good =

American musician (born 1975)

Nathan Good (born 1975) is an American musician, known for being the first drummer of indie rock band Death Cab for Cutie. He performed all drum tracks for their album Something About Airplanes. On the album We Have the Facts and We're Voting Yes, he performed on "The Employment Pages" and "Company Calls Epilogue", but left during the recording of the album to get married. In the early 2000s, Good played drums for the indie rock band The Revolutionary Hydra, appearing on two of their albums, and recorded drum tracks with engineer/producer Chris Walla of Death Cab for Cutie that were later used on the album "Make Good Choices" by Sean Nelson (formerly of the band Harvey Danger).
