= The Forbidden Love EP =

EP by Death Cab for Cutie
- Released: October 24, 2000
- Genre: Indie rock
- Length: 19:36
- Label: Barsuk
- Producer: Chris Walla

Death Cab for Cutie chronology
We Have the Facts and We're Voting Yes (2000)	The Forbidden Love EP (2000)	The Photo Album (2001)

Professional ratings
Review scores
Source	Rating
AllMusic	3/5 stars
Pitchfork Media	(7.5/10)
PopMatters	(favorable)
The Rolling Stone Album Guide	4/5 stars
Spin	(7/10)
Stylus Magazine	C+

The Forbidden Love EP is an EP by indie rock band Death Cab for Cutie, released October 24, 2000, on Barsuk Records.

The songs "405 (Acoustic)" and "Company Calls Epilogue (Alternate Take)" are an acoustic version and remix, respectively, of two songs from Death Cab for Cutie's second album, We Have the Facts and We're Voting Yes, which was released earlier the same year.

== Artwork ==
Regarding the EP's cover, Benjamin Gibbard noted that he "always wanted to have a release and have that photo be the cover and we took the pictures a long time ago when we were in college. When we pulled them out they didn't look like what we thought they were going to look and they didn't look as good. So we had to kind of change the contrast and make it look really shitty. To be perfectly honest it didn't turn out as good as we wanted it to. But it's an EP. It serves a purpose, and I think the label wishes they could have done more. It's not aesthetically our best release, but it's okay."

== Track listing ==
All songs written by Ben Gibbard.

No.	Title	Length
1.	"Photobooth"	3:46
2.	"Technicolor Girls"	3:38
3.	"Song for Kelly Huckaby"	3:51
4.	"405 (Acoustic)"	2:59
5.	"Company Calls Epilogue (Alternate Take)"	5:22
