= We Have the Facts and We're Voting Yes =

Studio album by Death Cab for Cutie
- Released: March 21, 2000
- Recorded: 1999
- Studios: Hall of Justice, Seattle, Washington
- Genres: Indie rock; Midwest emo; slowcore; indie pop; post-rock; alternative rock
- Length: 41:52
- Label: Barsuk
- Producer: Chris Walla

Death Cab for Cutie chronology
Something About Airplanes (1998)	We Have the Facts and We're Voting Yes (2000)	The Forbidden Love EP (2000)

We Have the Facts and We're Voting Yes is the second studio album by American rock band Death Cab for Cutie. It was released on March 21, 2000, through Barsuk Records. The band, which originally included singer-songwriter Ben Gibbard, guitarist/producer Chris Walla, bassist Nick Harmer, and drummer Nathan Good, formed in Bellingham, Washington in 1997. Their debut studio album, Something About Airplanes, was released in 1998 through Barsuk, after which Good exited the band. Between the two albums, both Gibbard and Walla released music via side projects, ¡All-Time Quarterback! and Martin Youth Auxiliary, respectively.

The album was developed over a period of five months between the three, and recorded at the members' parents' homes. The recording came at a transitional time for the band, who were on the cusp of adulthood with little idea of what was to come. Gibbard infused these post-collegiate anxieties into his lyricism, with his songwriting melding narratives with abstract imagery for the first time. The album is sonically downbeat, with its despondent sound and spindly guitar work heavily influenced by slowcore.

We Have the Facts and We're Voting Yes received acclaim from music critics, with praise directed towards Gibbard's songwriting. Death Cab for Cutie supported the album with their first full nationwide tour, with drummer Jayson Tolzdorf-Larson joining. No singles were released from the album, though the LP was followed by an extended play, The Forbidden Love EP, several months after its release.

== Background and development ==
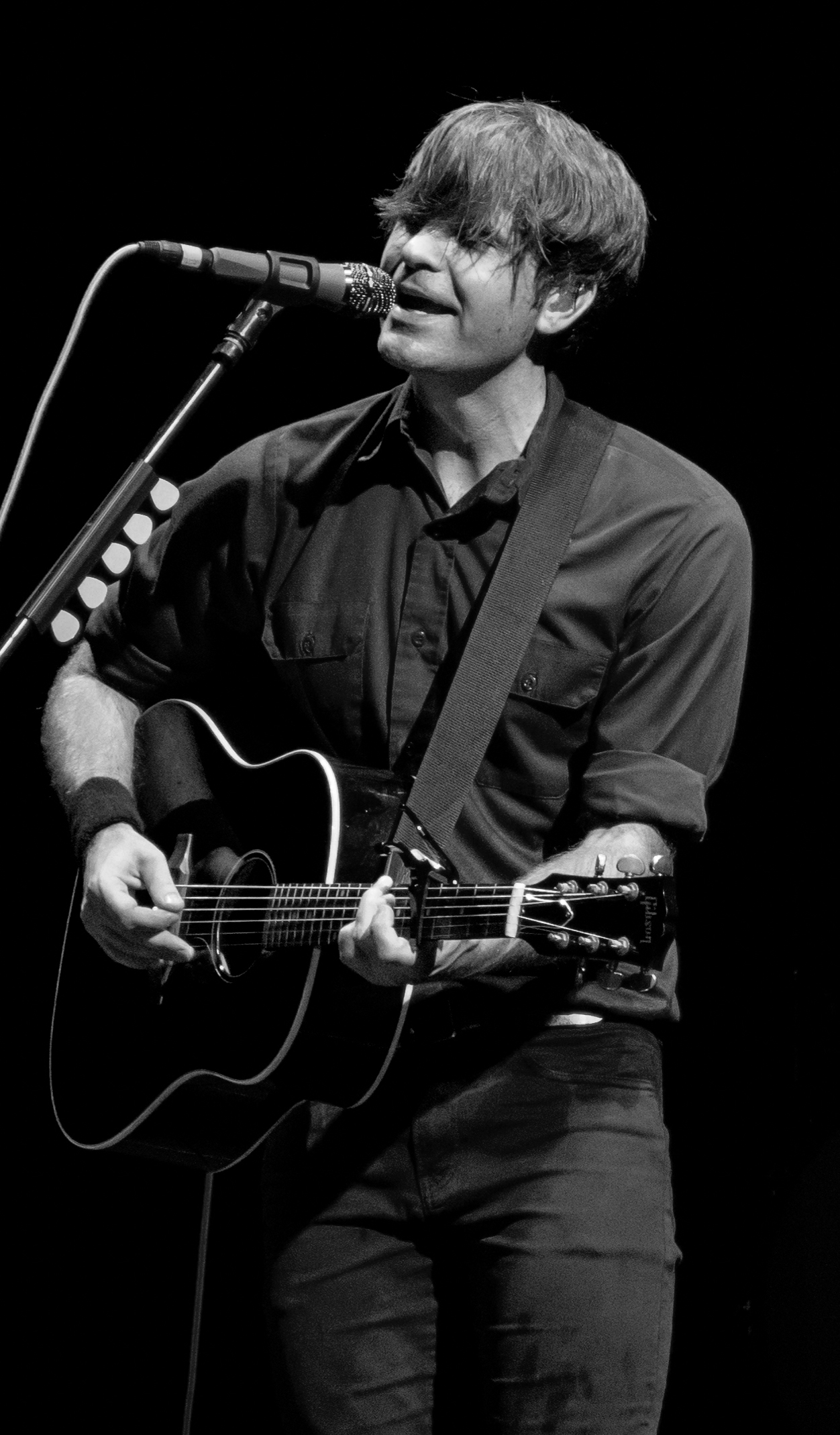
Frontman Ben Gibbard (photographed in 2015) started the band in 1997.

Death Cab for Cutie originated with singer-songwriter Ben Gibbard, formerly of the power pop outfit Pinwheel, while he attended Western Washington University in Bellingham, Washington. During a break from the group, Gibbard put together a demo of songs under the name Death Cab for Cutie, named after a song by the Bonzo Dog Doo-Dah Band. The demo tape was produced by guitarist/producer Christopher Walla, whom Gibbard had met at a concert. The cassette, You Can Play These Songs with Chords (1997), attracted significant local attention and prompted Gibbard to assemble a band lineup. Roommate Nick Harmer joined as the bassist, along with temporary drummer Nathan Good. Within a year, Death Cab for Cutie had signed to Seattle record label Barsuk Records, their debut studio album Something About Airplanes (1998) was released though.

Bellingham lacked employment opportunities or a real music scene, leading the band to relocate southbound to Seattle. Gibbard—an environmental chemistry major—had been working at a testing lab in Bellingham while Harmer and Walla were making ends meet at a coffee shop. The two of them moved back in with their parents, though Gibbard rented an apartment with his girlfriend. Good's situation was different, with him getting married, and he had accrued significant student debt. In addition to this, Good lacked the support of his musical interests from his parents that Gibbard, Walla, and Harmer shared. Good departed Death Cab for Cutie in early 1999, and the three-piece soldiered on with an interim drummer in his place from April to September of that year.

The trio struggled to find a suitable and "competent" percussionist who would agree to tour. Their lack of financial stability hindered matters; at the time, the band only made $50 per show, which mainly went towards fueling the Ford Econoline to drive to the next city. Gibbard has characterized this period in the history of Death Cab for Cutie as "interstitial", with them lacking assurance of what was to come: "It was made at a time when we didn’t have any sense of what the future held for us as individuals, let alone as a band," he recalled two decades later.

== Recording and production ==
In 1999, We Have the Facts and We're Voting Yes, like its predecessor, was recorded in a home environment rather than professional studio spaces, over a span of five months. Much of the former was tracked at the house of Harmer's mother's in Puyallup, Washington. She was working towards obtaining her doctoral degree at the time, spending her time in one half of the home. Death Cab for Cutie lived there for one month, working on the album at "all hours of the night." Recording for We Have the Facts and We're Voting Yes was later relocated to Walla's parents' house in Bothell. To record the album, the band were loaned a 16-track half-inch tape recorder from fellow Northwest musicians and label-mates, Sunset Valley. They worked intently and with a unified purpose; Gibbard remembered the three were "in the zone" because there was not much else in their lives at the time.

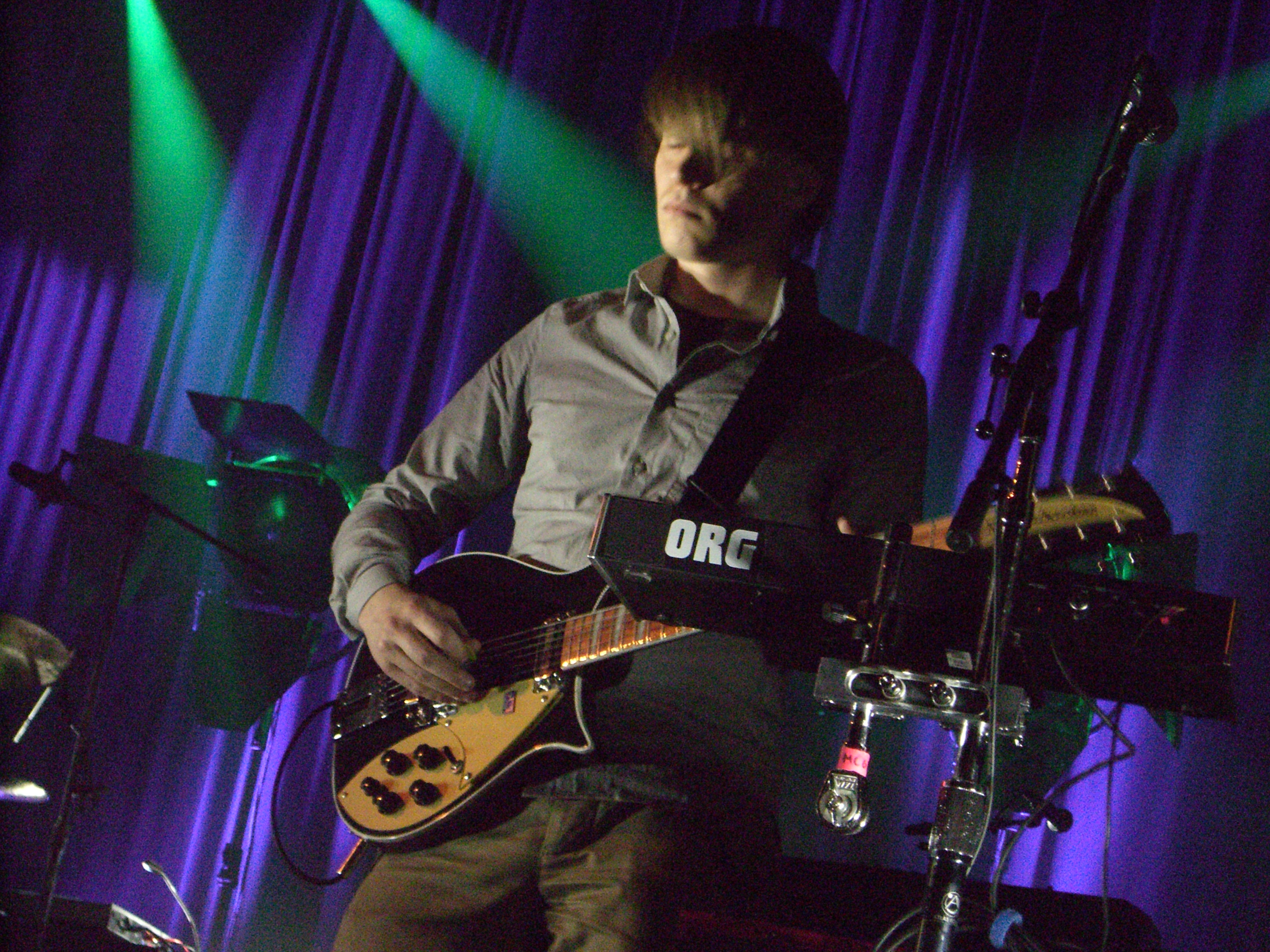
Producer Chris Walla, pictured in 2008.

Like past releases by Death Cab for Cutie, Walla served as producer on We Have the Facts and We're Voting Yes. He initially attempted to follow one of his idols, engineer Steve Albini, who holds a studio approach similar to realistic photography: this is simply documenting what is occurring with little intervention. Walla found the perspective unsatisfactory due to the constantly evolving nature of his recording locales and equipment. In the end, he viewed his job as to do what best serves the song, and letting production flourishes complement the songwriting rather than distract. The recording of drums proved to be somewhat difficult; the snare drum went out of tune two days into recording and with Gibbard possessing only mild skill with the instrument, none of the band members knew how to tune it. He played drums for the bulk of the album, having steadily spent time practicing for sufficiently improving his expertise. On We Have the Facts and We're Voting Yes, Gibbard plays to a click track for ensuring his timing. Good contributed percussion to the tracks, "Company Calls Epilogue" and "The Employment Pages". Death Cab for Cutie decided to record the two songs the day before mastering was set to begin for the album. Good returned at the trio's insistence to record drums for the songs, both of which were fully tracked and mixed at the last minute.

We Have the Facts and We're Voting Yes was finalized and mixed in Walla's bedroom. The liner notes for the album credit its recording and mixing to the Hall of Justice, a reference to the animated television series Super Friends. The Hall of Justice was simply Walla's name for "just a bunch of half-broken stuff that roves around from place to place at my direction." Later in 2000, Barsuk purchased Reciprocal Recording in Seattle, and let Walla manage the building; he subsequently renamed it Hall of Justice Recording. After We Have the Facts and We're Voting Yes was completed, Tony Lash, an engineer from Portland, Oregon, mastered the album.

== Composition ==
=== Music and composition ===
We Have the Facts and We're Voting Yes is stylistically regarded as an indie rock album; Gibbard himself classified the band as indie pop. The bleak point of view in the lyrics and despondent tone led to many writers categorizing the album as emo; it has been called an "emo classic." Gibbard and Walla's guitar parts on We Have the Facts and We're Voting Yes are different than those of later projects; with Gibbard later highlighting their "cool, spindly guitar-work." During his early 20s, Gibbard was influenced by the downbeat, slowcore music of Bedhead and Codeine. He felt inspired by Bedhead in particular, and incentivizing intricate guitar lines for the album that "weave" and "work through each other" over simpler chords. Gibbard also conceded that his longtime love for fellow Northwest rockers Built to Spill led to "flagrant" appropriation of their sound in early work by Death Cab for Cutie, while Jon Pareles of The New York Times also suggested We Have the Facts and We're Voting Yes is aurally reminiscent of Pavement.

Walla mixed the album with an Allen & Heath MixWizard console, which is a 16-channel board that has an array of different EQ settings. Walla had fun adjusting the EQ to extreme ranges, "overloading the channel" and creating a "gritty, awful, brittle sound." The board also has built-in presets, and though Walla found them "cheesy," the band ended up utilizing a "cathedral" setting for bombastic effects. Otherwise, We Have the Facts and We're Voting Yes mostly has an authentic room tone, with some delay effects on vocals that were produced via a delay pedal. Journalist Ian Cohen felt that Walla's nascent production skill displays "distinct sonic character, [with] everything obscured by a mid-fi mist, the pine scent of the Pacific Northwest and gin breath." Walla also utilized a portable sampler, Dr. Sample, to distort samples and re-incorporate them in a creative way. For example, the pulsating tone on "405" was sampled from a Yamaha keyboard, distorted into the sampler, set to repeat and ultimately lined up with the click track.

=== Theme and lyrics ===
Gibbard's songwriting on We Have the Facts and We're Voting Yes differs from its predecessor, possessing a more novelistic approach and frequently utilizing full sentences. Much of the songwriting was informed by his "post-collegiate neuroses" and general uncertainty regarding his path in life. In a later interview, Gibbard acknowledged his privilege as a "middle-class college-educated white man in America," admitting that, "In reality, [nervousness is] not something one should garner too much sympathy about." Ian Cohen interpreted the album as a concept album that chronicles a decaying relationship. Gibbard saw this evaluation as a "complete misconception," noting that We Have the Facts and We're Voting Yes is only conceptual in that it complies his feelings about entering adulthood. He cited Blake Schwarzenbach of Jawbreaker and fellow musician Elliott Smith as lyrical influences.

The first half of "Title Track" contains a softer, more lo-fi sound; Cohen assumed it was run through a low-pass filter, and likened the effect to "being heard through a thin apartment wall." After a minute and a half, the production abruptly adjusts to a higher-quality sound. In actuality, both parts of the first portion were recorded live together with one microphone, double-tracked, and mixed separately. The two pieces were put together during mastering; Tony Lash narrowed the stereo image for a more "drastic" effect. Walla had the idea to trick listeners into believing the album was no different to its predecessor, letting the lower-quality sound cycle for too long before improving. "Title Track" emulates the writing style of beat poet Jack Kerouac, one of Gibbard's favorite writers. The second track, "The Employment Pages", documents Gibbard's job hunting upon his moving to Seattle, from which he was routinely rejected. "I remember thinking, 'I have a degree in environmental chemistry, I worked in a lab and I can’t get a job stocking shelves?'", he said in an interview. Gibbard summarized the song as a "transition of going from idyllic, easy, college-town living, to trying to become an adult for some reason, but you're not quite sure why."

"Lowell, MA" was a holdover that was penned during the development of Something About Airplanes. The track touches on Gibbard's love for Kerouac, with its localized title being a reference to his hometown, Lowell, Massachusetts. The title of "405" stemmed from the several freeways that bypass Interstate 5, the major north–south Interstate Highway on the West Coast of the United States, though specifically references Interstate 405 in Seattle. In college, Gibbard saw a girl whose family lived off the 405; the song makes reference to a shared weekend smoking cigarettes and drinking red wine. The lyric "hide your bad habits underneath the patio" originated from the fact that the two of them hid the cigarette butts underneath the patio in order to fool her parents, who were religious and more straight-laced. "Little Fury Bugs" utilizes a demo that Gibbard recorded at home on a four-track recorder and ultimately gave to Walla, who contributed additional elements. In the song, Gibbard performs in an odd tuning; the result of an inexpensive toy guitar he was playing on.

Gibbard had a creative breakthrough upon writing "Company Calls Epilogue", which he has frequently labeled one of his favorite songs he ever wrote. Prior to its creation, Gibbard had viewed his lyricism on earlier works as too obtuse and emulative of R.E.M., who were a big influence. He considered "Epilogue" to be a proper marriage between this imperceptive imagery and storytelling, and a "benchmark" by which later songs would be judged. It has little in common with the predecessor, "Company Calls", besides incorporating unused lyrics meant for the original. This iteration of "Epilogue" was recorded only one day before mastering was set to begin; an alternate edition was later released on The Forbidden Love EP later in 2020. The album version contains an outro that was culled from a scratch demo, which featured solely Gibbard and his guitar. It was recorded with a microphone that cost only $4. "No Joy in Mudville" is a tribute to musician Lou Reed, while "Scientist Studies" stemmed from the home Death Cab for Cutie had previously inhabited in Bellingham, which had no heating. Gibbard titled it after his study material at the time.

== Release and commercial performance ==
The title We Have the Facts and We're Voting Yes came from musician Herbert Burgel, a Seattle contemporary who formed the band Rat Cat Hogan. At one of his concerts, Burgle wore a T-shirt emblazoned with the title phrase, which referenced a legislative initiative in Nebraska at the time.

Sales expectations were higher for We Have the Facts and We're Voting Yes for Death Cab for Cutie. Barsuk issued the album on March 21, 2000, on CD and vinyl. Two vinyl variants were issued; a standard black edition, which was later re-issued in 2014, and a limited white-colored wax. Despite the band being largely outsiders to the music industry, the album was commercially successful, though muted in comparison to their later projects. We Have the Facts and We're Voting Yes was supported by college radio stations, and debuted "strongly" on CMJ New Music Report's Top 200 at number 51. It premiered 11 places higher on the magazine's Core Radio ranking, which measured airplay. Barsuk initially pressed 20,000 copies; the album had sold 32,000 by November 2001. The numbers were considered "staggering" for the record label, which was essentially a "one-man operation" run by founder Josh Rosenfield.

== Critical reception ==
Professional ratings
Review scores
Source	Rating
AllMusic	4/5 stars
Mojo	4/5 stars
NME	7/10
Pitchfork	7.5/10
PopMatters	8.0/10
The Rolling Stone Album Guide	3.5/5 stars
Tiny Mix Tapes	5/5

We Have the Facts and We're Voting Yes was met with positive reviews from music critics. Chris Parker of Indy Week wrote that like its predecessor, the album received "glowing critical accolades," while Kimberly Chun of the San Francisco Chronicle said that it received "effusive critical reception in the national music media." AllMusic reviewer Jack Rabid viewed the album as the band's "best and brightest LP" yet, calling it a "superb" effort which marks Gibbard's emergence as a "sublime" songwriter. Brent DiCrescenzo of the then-emerging website Pitchfork likened it to the work of an experienced, mid-career band, lauding its "warm, rich tone" and "delicate beauty." PopMatters critic Steve Lichtenstein praised the album for being "something you want to discover and cherish with no strings attached, and pass it on as eagerly." And editor of The Rolling Stone Album Guide found the melodies superior to prior releases, complimenting its "smattering of psychedelia."

Stephen Thompson of The A.V. Club called the album a marvelous improvement, opining that it "gets better the longer you listen to it, improving over its predecessor at every turn and revealing a surprising mastery of pop's many languages." A CMJ New Music Report editorialist branded the album an "impressive collection [...] In an otherwise flooded genre, DCFC stands out as one of the more innovative and skillful of the pack." Pareles included it in a listing for The New York Times "Worthwhile Albums Most People Missed" at the end of 2000, proposing that "[Gibbard's] wiry songs aren't as uncertain as their lyrics pretend to be."

== Legacy ==
For its 20th anniversary, several publications published retrospective pieces celebrating We Have the Facts and We're Voting Yes. Death Cab for Cutie has generally looked back at the album fondly; Gibbard ranked it as his second favorite album the band made, remarking, "[It was] by far the biggest point of entry for the OG fans. [...] Facts felt like we were a proper band in the world. [...] I just feel like that record represents the best of that era." Likewise, Walla has reminisced positively about the making of the album, doing so in 2011:

That second record, especially, for years and years has been my favorite ... As I try to figure out what it is about that record that I react to so strongly – we started recording it like twelve years ago – dissecting all those elements and trying to reverse-engineer what happened, I've learned so much about what I value about songwriting and about performances."

We Have the Facts and We're Voting Yes was ranked the 14th greatest indie rock album of all time by editors of Amazon.com. It was ranked 27th on Pitchfork's list of "The 50 Best Indie Rock Albums of the Pacific Northwest".

== Track listing ==
All tracks are written by Ben Gibbard, unless otherwise noted.

No.	Title	Writer(s)	Length
1.	"Title Track"		3:29
2.	"The Employment Pages"		4:04
3.	"For What Reason"		2:52
4.	"Lowell, MA"	Gibbard, Chris Walla	3:28
5.	"405"		3:37
6.	"Little Fury Bugs"		3:48
7.	"Company Calls"	Gibbard, Nick Harmer, Walla	3:19
8.	"Company Calls Epilogue"		5:16
9.	"No Joy in Mudville"	Gibbard, Harmer, Walla	6:03
10.	"Scientist Studies"		5:56
Total length:			41:52

== Personnel ==
Death Cab for Cutie

- Ben Gibbard – vocals, electric and acoustic guitars, drums, percussion, Casiotone, organ
- Nathan Good – drums on "The Employment Pages" and "Company Calls Epilogue"
- Nick Harmer – bass guitar
- Chris Walla – guitar, electric piano, backing vocals, percussion, glockenspiel, samples, production, mixing

Additional personnel

- Tony Lash – mastering
