= You Can Play These Songs with Chords =

Demo album by Death Cab for Cutie

Demo album by Death Cab for Cutie
- Released: 1997
- Recorded: May–July 1997 (original); November 1996 – January 2000 (reissue)
- Genre: Indie rock
- Length: 30:05
- Label: Barsuk
- Producer: Ben Gibbard

Death Cab for Cutie chronology
You Can Play These Songs with Chords (1997)	Something About Airplanes (1998)

Professional ratings
Aggregate scores
Source	Rating
Metacritic	65/100
Review scores
Source	Rating
AllMusic	2.5/5 stars
Almost Cool	6.5/10
Billboard	(positive)
Dusted Magazine	(positive)
Pitchfork	6.4/10
PopMatters	7/10 stars
Rolling Stone	3/5 stars
Stylus Magazine	C

You Can Play These Songs with Chords is an early (1996–97) demo from the rock band Death Cab for Cutie, which at the time consisted entirely of founder Ben Gibbard. This demo was originally released on cassette by Elsinor Records. It proved so popular, Gibbard recruited other musicians to make a full band, which would go on to record Something About Airplanes, the band's debut studio album.

You Can Play These Songs with Chords was expanded with ten more songs and re-released on October 22, 2002, through Barsuk Records on the heels of the success of The Photo Album.

== Track listing ==
=== Original release ===
All songs written by Benjamin Gibbard.

No.	Title	Length
1.	"President of What?"	4:06
2.	"Champagne from a Paper Cup"	2:34
3.	"Pictures in an Exhibition"	4:02
4.	"Hindsight"	3:47
5.	"That's Incentive"	2:13
6.	"Amputations"	4:03
7.	"Two Cars"	3:31
8.	"Line of Best Fit"	5:49

=== Re-issue additional tracks ===
All songs written by Benjamin Gibbard, Nick Harmer and Christopher Walla except as otherwise noted.

No.	Title	Writer(s)	Length
1.	"This Charming Man"	Johnny Marr, Morrissey	2:14
2.	"TV Trays"		4:02
3.	"New Candles"		3:02
4.	"Tomorrow"		2:17
5.	"Flustered/Hey Tomcat!"		2:56
6.	"State Street Residential"		5:51
7.	"Wait"	Secret Stars	3:34
8.	"Prove My Hypotheses"		4:11
9.	"Song for Kelly Huckaby" (Facts version)		3:51
10.	"Army Corps of Architects"		4:43

== Personnel ==
- Ben Gibbard – vocals, guitar, bass guitar, piano, drums
- Nathan Good – drums, tambourine
- Nick Harmer – bass guitar
- Christopher Walla – guitar, vocals "New Candles" and "Tomorrow"
