= The Photo Album =

Studio album by Death Cab for Cutie
- Released: October 9, 2001
- Recorded: 2001
- Studio: Hall of Justice (Seattle)
- Genre: Indie rock; emo
- Length: 38:51
- Label: Barsuk/Fierce Panda
- Producer: Chris Walla

Death Cab for Cutie chronology
We Have the Facts and We're Voting Yes (2000)	The Photo Album (2001)	The Stability EP (2002)

Singles from The Photo Album
- 1. "A Movie Script Ending" Released: February 8, 2002; 2. "I Was a Kaleidoscope" Released: October 15, 2002; 3. "We Laugh Indoors" Released: October 29, 2002

The Photo Album is the third studio album by American indie rock band Death Cab for Cutie, released October 9, 2001 on Barsuk Records. Produced by band member Chris Walla, it is the band's only full-length album to feature drummer Michael Schorr.

The albums spawned three singles: "A Movie Script Ending", "I Was a Kaleidoscope", and "We Laugh Indoors". All of the singles charted on the UK Singles Chart, with the highest-charting song "I Was a Kaleidoscope" peaking at number 115. The Photo Album was the first Death Cab for Cutie album to feature charting songs, with "A Movie Script Ending" also becoming the first of three songs by the band to eventually feature on the television show The O.C..

A limited edition extended play called The Stability EP was released in early 2002, containing bonus tracks from the limited edition and Japanese versions of The Photo Album.

To celebrate the album's 20th anniversary, a deluxe edition was released 20 days after the 20th anniversary, on October 29, 2021. This edition contains demos of the original release's 10 tracks and demos of "20th Century Towers" and "Stable Song", plus other unreleased material such as live recordings and studio outtakes.

== Reception ==
Professional ratings
Aggregate scores
Source	Rating
Metacritic	75/100
Review scores
Source	Rating
AllMusic	3/5 stars
Alternative Press	8/10
The Austin Chronicle	3/5 stars
The Boston Phoenix	3/4 stars
NME	8/10
Pitchfork	7.1/10
Q	3/5 stars
The Rolling Stone Album Guide	4.5/5 stars
Spin	7/10
Under the Radar	8/10

The Photo Album holds a score of 75 out of 100 from the review aggregating site Metacritic based on 17 reviews, indicating "generally favorable reviews". John D. Luerssen of Billboard gave the album a very favorable review and said, "If it's true that music of this nature doesn't get anymore heartfelt, it also rarely gets more infectious." Mojo wrote that the band "weave together smartly taut guitars with vivid observational lyrics to create perfectly crafted pop songs, stunning in their simplicity and beauty", while Alternative Press called the album "the skillful meshing of Benjamin Gibbard's part-stream-of-consciousness, part-confessional vocals with melancholy piano and achingly melodic guitars that reveal a fleshed-out Cutie are indeed a band of uncommon beauty." Nude as the News gave it a score of eight out of ten and stated, "While not every song is a gem, the ones that are have pushed the band's already high standard of compelling indie pop one notch higher." Neumu.net gave it seven stars out of ten and called it "evidence of a band that's maturing, slowing down and trying new things." Drawer B gave it a positive review and stated, "The most noteworthy aspect of The Photo Album is the band's upward trajectory. The music is cohesive and even, though still somewhat sluggish."

In a mixed assessment, Stephen Thompson of The A.V. Club wrote that the album "is often marked by pleasant but static, middle-of-the-road material." Melanie Haupt of The Austin Chronicle said, "It's a rare talent that can express such emotions so concisely; even more rare is the ability to deliver them in a near-whisper rather than a scream." Q wrote, "Full of beautiful pop songs, The Photo Album is just that—a collection of vignettes." Robert Christgau of The Village Voice gave the album a three-star honorable mention rating, indicating "an enjoyable effort consumers attuned to its overriding aesthetic or individual vision may well treasure".

== Track listing ==
No.	Title	Writer(s)	Length
1.	"Steadier Footing"	Ben Gibbard	1:47
2.	"A Movie Script Ending"	Gibbard	4:19
3.	"We Laugh Indoors"	Gibbard, Nick Harmer, Chris Walla	4:58
4.	"Information Travels Faster"	Gibbard, Walla	4:02
5.	"Why You'd Want to Live Here"	Gibbard	4:44
6.	"Blacking Out the Friction"	Gibbard	3:27
7.	"I Was a Kaleidoscope"	Gibbard, Walla	2:50
8.	"Styrofoam Plates"	Gibbard, Harmer, Walla	5:24
9.	"Coney Island"	Gibbard	2:40
10.	"Debate Exposes Doubt"	Gibbard, Walla	4:36

Japanese edition bonus track (also on Deluxe Edition as track 14)
No.	Title	Length
11.	"Gridlock Caravans" (also track 6 on LP edition and found on the UK bonus disc)

Japanese and limited edition bonus tracks (also on The Stability EP, and Deluxe Edition as tracks 11–13)
No.	Title	Length
12.	"20th Century Towers" (Gibbard/Harmer/Walla)
13.	"All Is Full of Love" (Björk Guðmundsdóttir)
14.	"Stability" (Gibbard/Walla)

Deluxe Edition
No.	Title	Length
15.	"Information Travels Faster (Alternate Lyric Demo)"	4:53
16.	"I Wanna Be Adored (Live)"	4:23
17.	"I Was A Kaleidoscope (Live)"	2:53
18.	"We Laugh Indoors (Dub)"	3:56
19.	"Debate Exposes Doubt (Acoustic)"	3:20
20.	"A Movie Script Ending (Acoustic)"	4:30
21.	"I Was A Kaleidoscope (Acoustic, Live on KEXP)"	3:01
22.	"Corny Island (Studio Outtake)"	2:30
23.	"We Laugh Indoors (UK Single Mix)"	4:58
24.	"Steadier Footing (Acoustic Studio Outtake)"	1:47
25.	"A Movie Script Ending (Band Demo)"	4:19
26.	"We Laugh Indoors (Band Demo)"	4:57
27.	"Information Travels Faster (Band Demo)"	4:01
28.	"Why You'd Want to Live Here (Band Demo)"	4:39
29.	"Blacking Out the Friction (Band Demo)"	3:45
30.	"I Was a Kaleidoscope (Band Demo)"	2:57
31.	"Styrofoam Plates (Band Demo)"	5:12
32.	"Coney Island (Band Demo)"	3:01
33.	"Debate Exposes Doubt (Band Demo)"	3:11
34.	"20th Century Towers (Band Demo)"	3:37
35.	"Stable Song (Band Demo)"	3:37

== Personnel ==
Death Cab for Cutie

- Ben Gibbard – vocals, guitar, piano, organ
- Nick Harmer – bass guitar, organ
- Michael Schorr – drums, tambourine, shaker, loops
- Chris Walla – guitar, piano, loops

Additional personnel

- Sean Nelson – high vocals on "Blacking Out the Friction", harmony vocals on "I Was a Kaleidoscope"
- Jeff Saltzman – mastering
- John Vanderslice – low vocals on "Blacking Out the Friction", backing vocals on "I Was a Kaleidoscope"
