= Shake =

Shake, The Shakes, Shaking, or Shakin' may refer to:

- Handshake, a greeting and parting custom
- Milkshake, a sweet cold beverage similar to very soft ice cream, often called a shake
- Tremor, a medical symptom
- Vibration

It may also refer to:

== People ==
- Shake (singer) (Sheikh Abdullah Ahmad), Malaysian singer
- Shake Milton (born 1996), American basketball player
- 070 Shake (born 1997), American rapper and singer
- Christi Shake (born 1980), 2002 Playboy playmate
- Kaitlyn Shake, American politician
- Anthony "Shake" Shakir, Detroit techno producer
- Shakin' Stevens (born 1948), Welsh rock and roll singer
- Xie Keyin (born 1997), Chinese singer, rapper and songwriter known as Shaking

== Music ==
=== Albums ===
- Shake! (album) (1968), by the Siegel–Schwall Band
- Shakin' (album), 1986 work by country music group Sawyer Brown
- Shake (John Schlitt album) (1995)
- Shake (2001), by Zucchero Fornaciari
- Shake (The Thing album) (2015)

=== Songs ===
- "Shake", by Alesha Dixon from The Alesha Show: The Encore (2009)
- "Shake" (CNBLUE song) (2017)
- "Shake" (Sam Cooke song) (1964), notably covered by Otis Redding
- "Shake", by Double (1999)
- "Shake" (EliZe song) (2004)
- "Shake" (Flavour N'abania song) (2012)
- "Shake", by GQ (1981)
- "Shake", by The Head and the Heart from Let's Be Still (2013)
- "Shake", a song by Victoria Justice (2013)
- "Shake" (Little Boots song) (2011)
- "Shake" (Jesse McCartney song) (2010)
- "Shake", by Machines of Loving Grace from the album Concentration (1993)
- "Shake", by Stephen Sanchez from Angel Face (2023)
- "Shake!" (The Time song) (1990)
- "Shake" (Ying Yang Twins song) (2005)
- "Shake" (IShowSpeed song) (2021)
- "Shakin'" (Sawyer Brown song) (1986)
- "Shakin' ", by The Dandy Warhols from Thirteen Tales from Urban Bohemia (2000)
- "Shakin'" (Eddie Money song) (1982)
- "The Shake" (Kisschasy song) (2005)
- "The Shake" (Laurie Johnson) (1965), the theme song to the TV series The Avengers Theme
- "The Shake" (Neal McCoy song) (1997)

=== Other music ===
- The Shake (American rock band)
- The Shake (dance), a fad dance of the 1960s
- Shake (music) (more commonly known as a trill), a musical ornament

== Other ==
- Shake (company), a legal document startup
- Shake (shingle), a wooden shingle made from split logs
- Shake (software), an image-compositing package produced by Apple Inc
- Shakes (timber), cracks in timber
- Shake (unit), an informal unit of time equal to ten nanoseconds
- Shake, Zimbabwe
- SHAKE algorithm, a time integration algorithm for molecular dynamics simulation
- 10 Shake, an Australian TV channel
- Camera shake, an effect fixed with image stabilization
- Master Shake, a character in Aqua Teen Hunger Force
- Shake, another name for Sake language, used in parts of Gabon
- Shake (social class)

== See also ==
- Earthquake
- The Shake (disambiguation)
- Shake It (disambiguation)
- Shaked (surname)
- Shaken (disambiguation)
- Shaker (disambiguation)
- Shakes (disambiguation)
- Milkshake (disambiguation)
- Shock (disambiguation)
- Shook (disambiguation)
