= Shook =

Shook may refer to:

== People with the surname ==
- Shook (surname)

== Music ==
- Shook (album), a 2023 album by Algiers
- "Shook", a song by Shawn Desman from the 2002 album Shawn Desman
- "Shook (The Answer)", a song by Keshia Chanté from the 2004 album Keshia Chanté
- "Shook", a 2020 song by Tkay Maidza
- "Shook", a 2022 song by Meghan Trainor from Takin' It Back
- "Shook" (Sugababes song), 2025

== Film ==
- Shook (2021 film), an American horror film directed by Jennifer Harrington
- Shook (2024 film), a Canadian drama film directed by Amar Wala

== Other uses ==
- Shook (magazine)
- Shook, Missouri, U.S.
- Shooks, Minnesota, U.S.
- Shooks Run (Colorado Springs, Colorado), U.S.
- Shooks Township, Beltrami County, Minnesota, U.S.
- Shook, a 2019 web series created by Disney Channel

== See also ==
- All Shook Up (disambiguation)
- Shake (disambiguation)
- Shaked (surname)
- Shaken (disambiguation)
- Shaker (disambiguation)
- Shakes (disambiguation)
