= Shaken =

Shaken may refer to:

- "Shaken" (song), a song by Rachel Lampa
- "Shaken" (LP song), a 2019 song by LP (Laura Pergolizzi)
- Shaken (weapon), a variety of shuriken
- Shaken, a Japanese motor-vehicle inspection program
- STIR/SHAKEN, a system to address caller-id spoofing
- Sha-Ken, major Japanese phototypesetting company

== See also ==
- Shake (disambiguation)
- Shook (disambiguation)
- Shaked (surname)
- Shaker (disambiguation)
- Shakes (disambiguation)
- Shaken, not stirred
