= Shakes =

Shakes may refer to:

- Milkshakes
  - Health shakes
- Delirium tremens or "the shakes", a symptom of alcohol withdrawal
- Shakes (timber), cracks in timber
- Shakes (Tlingit leaders), a Tlingit generational leadership title
- Shakes the Clown, a 1991 film by and starring Bobcat Goldthwait
- The Shakes (album), by Herbert, 2015
- "Shakes", a song by Emeli Sandé from Long Live the Angels, 2016
- "Shakes", a song by Luke Hemmings from Boy, 2024
- "The Shakes", a song by Priestess from Hello Master, 2005
- Shakes, a fictional character in the comic Supa Strikas

== People ==
- Shakes Kubuitsile (born 1962), Botswana boxer
- Paul Shakes (born 1952), Canadian ice hockey player
- Ricky Shakes (born 1985), English football player
- Ephraim Mashaba (born 1950), nicknamed Shakes, South African football manager and former player
- Siviwe Soyizwapi (born 1992), nicknamed Shakes, South African rugby union player

== See also ==
- Shake (disambiguation)
- Shaked, a secular Israeli settlement in the West Bank
- Shaken (disambiguation)
- Shaker (disambiguation)
- Shook (disambiguation)
