= Shake It (disambiguation) =

"Shake It" is a 2008 song by Metro Station.

Shake It may also refer to:

- Booty shake

== Albums ==
- Shake It..., by Endorphin, or the title song, 2004
- Shake It (EP), by Sistar, or the title song, 2015
- Shake It, by Gal Level, 2004

== Songs ==
- "Shake It" (Iain Matthews song), 1978
- "Shake It" (Kaylan song), 2000
- "Shake It" (Kay Flock song), 2022
- "Shake It" (Sakis Rouvas song), representing Greece at Eurovision 2004
- "Shake It", by Aaron Carter from Aaron Carter, 1997
- "Shake It", by Bella Thorne, 2021
- "Shake It", by Bow Wow from New Jack City II, 2009
- "Shake It", by Caesars, 1995
- "Shake It", by Charli XCX, Big Freedia, Cupcakke, Brooke Candy and Pabllo Vittar from Charli, 2019
- "Shake It", by David Bowie from Let's Dance, 1983
- "Shake It", by Bomb the Bass from Into the Dragon, 1988
- "Shake It", by MC Shy D from Comin' Correct in 88, 1988
- "Shake It (Move a Little Closer)", by Alex Cartañá, 2003
- "Shake It", by Pritam, Suzanne D Mello, Kailash Kher and Indee from Naksha, 2006 Indian film

== Other uses ==
- Shake It Records, an Ohio record label and record store established in 1979
- Wario Land: Shake It!, a 2008 video game for the Wii

== See also ==
- Shake (disambiguation)
- Shake It Off (disambiguation)
- Shake It Up (disambiguation)
