= The Shake =

The Shake may refer to:

- The Shake (band), a New York City indie rock band
- "The Shake" (Kisschasy song)
- "The Shake" (Neal McCoy song)
- The Shake (Laurie Johnson), an LP by Laurie Johnson, the base of what is now known as "The Avengers Theme"
- The Shake (dance), a fad dance of the 1960s

== See also ==
- Shake (disambiguation)
