= The Beatles in Hamburg =

Performances of the Beatles in Hamburg

The Beatles photographed by Astrid Kirchherr in 1960; left to right: Pete Best, George Harrison, John Lennon, Paul McCartney, and Stuart Sutcliffe. Ringo Starr had not yet joined the group.

The original lineup of the Beatles—John Lennon, Paul McCartney, George Harrison, Stuart Sutcliffe and Pete Best—regularly performed at clubs in Hamburg, West Germany, from August 1960 to May 1962. This period honed their performance skills, widened their reputation, and led to their first recording, which brought them to the attention of Brian Epstein. In November and December 1962 they played with Ringo Starr on drums.

The Beatles' booking agent, Allan Williams, decided to send the group to Hamburg when another group he managed, Derry and the Seniors, proved successful there. Having no permanent drummer at the time, they recruited Best a few days before their departure. After breaking their contract by playing at another club, Harrison was deported for being underaged, and McCartney and Best were arrested and deported for attempted arson.

In Hamburg, the Beatles met Astrid Kirchherr, who was instrumental in their adoption of the mop-topped Beatle haircut, and Sutcliffe decided to leave the group to continue his studies. Less than a year later, he died of a brain hemorrhage.

== Hamburg in the 1960s ==
Hamburg had once been West Germany's main seaport, the fourth-largest in the world, but during World War II in 1943 half of the city was reduced to rubble by American and British bombing raids. By 1960, when the Beatles arrived, the Hamburg that had grown up from the ruins of WWII had established a reputation throughout Europe as a city of vice and criminal activity. In contrast to an economically depressed post-war Liverpool, Hamburg was a wealthy city. Just 15 years had passed since the end of the war in which England and Germany were mortal enemies when this first wave of British musicians started to wash the shores of the Hamburg harbour. Tony Sheridan explained the resistance faced at home by these musicians as they were preparing to embark for Germany for the first time: "My parents—all our parents—they went wild when they heard that we were coming to Germany.... When I went anyway, I broke my mother's heart by coming to Germany ... to the enemy ... to play rock and roll music."

Sheridan also reflected on the era when he arrived in Germany, just over a decade after the end of World War II. He describes these teenagers and young adults whom he encountered in these Hamburg night clubs: "This was a violent place in those days, because all the kids from the war time (like I'm a wartime child too) ... so the German wartime kids, they had problems, psychological problems and aggressive, very aggressive. This was a very rough place, people getting kicked and hit and blood and fists.... One day I was on the stage [of the Kaiserkeller] playing, and somebody was getting killed down here and I just went ... put my hands up ... [covering my eyes with my hands], closed myself up and just carried on playing.... I didn't see anything [mimicking playing guitar and singing] Rock and roll, man! ... Being musicians, it was easier to stay alive, you know, because if you played, people liked you, because everybody likes music, even the bad people like music, even the gangsters they like music, so we had everybody on our side."

== Nightlife in Hamburg clubs ==
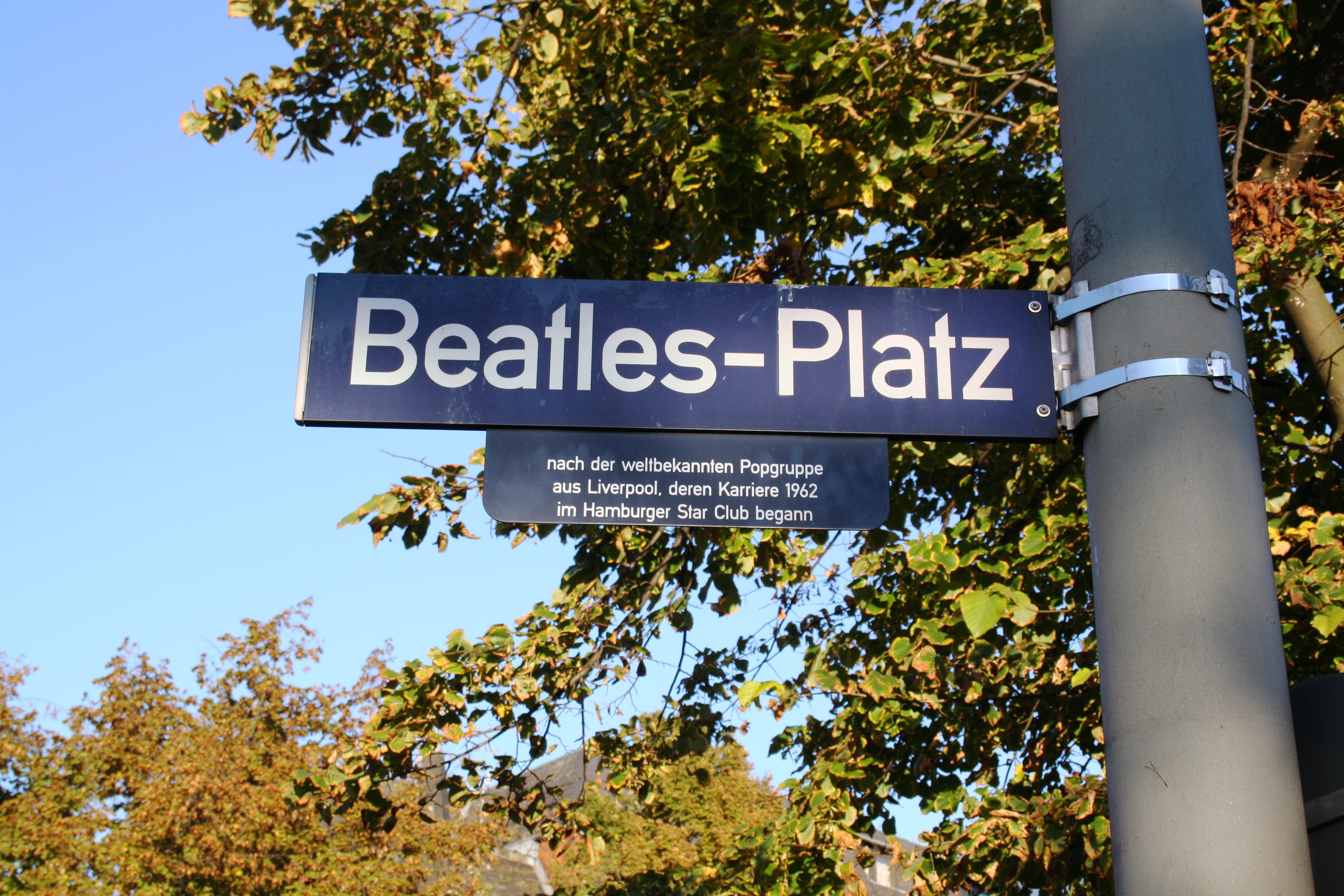
The Beatles-Platz in Hamburg

In the early 1960s, the Hamburg scene revolved around the Kaiserkeller, Top Ten, Star-Club, Beer-Shop, Mambo, Holle, Wagabond, and the Pacific Hotel, as well as the less popular clubs like Grannies, the Ice Cream Shop, Chugs, and Sacha's. The Reeperbahn and the Grosse Freiheit were decorated with neon lights, with posters advertising the performers in the clubs. Each club had a doorman whose job was to entice customers inside, as the drinks were expensive.

Harrison remembered the Reeperbahn and Große Freiheit as the best thing the group had ever seen, as it had so many neon lights, clubs and restaurants, although also saying, "The whole area was full of transvestites and prostitutes and gangsters, but I couldn't say that they were the audience ... Hamburg was really like our apprenticeship, learning how to play in front of people."

McCartney explained that the Beatles had only experienced sex with girls from Liverpool, but when they got to Hamburg the only women who hung around the clubs late at night were strippers, dancers, or prostitutes. Harrison (who was then only 17) called Hamburg "the naughtiest city in the world". McCartney said: "By the time you got to Hamburg, a girlfriend there was likely to be a stripper, so to be suddenly involved with a hard-core striptease artist, who obviously knew a thing or two about sex... it was quite an eye-opener." Gerry Marsden—frontman for Gerry & the Pacemakers—remembered visiting a Hamburg brothel in Herbertstraße with Lennon: "We paid our money, went in and sat down. This guy came out with the biggest lady we had ever seen in our lives. She looked like a bus with a bra on. We ran out that door so quick we didn't hear it shut. I wanted to go back to get my money back but John said: 'No, we'd better not. Might cause trouble.'"

=== Stimulants used to perform long hours ===
The Beatles's introduction to "Prellies" (Preludin - a successor of Pervitin) was in Hamburg. As the group had to play for hours, Sheridan offered them Preludin, saying: "Here's something to keep you awake." Astrid Kirchherr also supplied Sutcliffe and the other Beatles with Preludin, which when taken with beer, made them feel euphoric and helped to keep them awake until the early hours of the morning. Looking back, Harrison said that the whole group would be "frothing at the mouth" and would sometimes stay awake for days. Lennon recalled, "The waiters always had these pills [Preludin], so when they saw the musicians falling over with tiredness or drink, they'd give you the pill. You could work almost endlessly until the pill wore off, and then you'd have another." McCartney said that he would usually take one, but Lennon would often take four or five.

Legitimate use of Preludin required a doctor's prescription, but Kirchherr's mother was able to obtain it from a local chemist who supplied the drug without asking questions. Epstein later asked the Star-Club owner, Weissleder, not to publish photographs showing the group playing with tubes of Preludin. Starr explained that Dexedrine too was in plentiful supply in Hamburg, as it was known to produce increased wakefulness and focus, in association with decreased fatigue, and decreased appetite.

== Leaving Liverpool ==
Allan Williams, a 29-year-old Liverpool businessman and promoter, had sent his leading group, Derry and the Seniors (later known as Howie Casey and the Seniors), to Hamburg, where they were enjoying success, and wanted to send an additional group. He initially tried to send Rory Storm and the Hurricanes, but Storm and his group were committed to a Butlins holiday camp and turned Williams' offer down, as did Gerry and the Pacemakers. Williams started promoting concerts for The Beatles in May 1960, after they had played at his Jacaranda club in Liverpool, and offered The Beatles the Hamburg bookings. He booked them into Bruno Koschmider's Indra club in Hamburg for a season of bookings starting on 12 August 1960, but said that he was not impressed with them as a musical group, and hoped to find a better act to follow them.

As they had no permanent drummer, McCartney looked for someone to fill the position, which was difficult, as Lennon later said that drummers were "few and far between", because a set of drums was an expensive item. Harrison had seen Best playing with the Black Jacks in The Casbah Coffee Club (which was run by his mother, Mona Best). He was regarded as a steady drummer, playing the bass drum on all four beats in the bar, which pushed the rhythm, and was known in Liverpool at the time as being "mean, moody, and magnificent" by female fans, which convinced McCartney he would be good for the group. After the Black Jacks broke up, McCartney asked Best to go to Hamburg, telling him they would earn £15 per week each. Best had the chance to go to a teacher-training college, as he had passed his school exams, unlike Lennon, McCartney and Harrison, who had failed most of theirs, but decided that playing in Hamburg would be a better career move.

The St. Pauli quarter of Hamburg, where the Indra club was located, was well known as a red light district where prostitutes were to be found, and was a dangerous place for anyone that looked different from the usual clientele. McCartney's father, Jim McCartney, was reluctant to let his teenage son go to Hamburg, but relented after a visit from Williams, who told him that he "shouldn't worry". Lennon's aunt, Mimi Smith, was also reluctant to allow Lennon to go to Hamburg, wanting Lennon to continue his studies, but Lennon placated her by exaggerating the amount he would earn. Best had an audition in Williams' Jacaranda club on 15 August 1960, and travelled to Hamburg the next day as a member of the group. Williams later admitted that the audition with Best was not needed, as they had not found any other drummer willing to travel to Hamburg, but did not tell Best in case he asked for more money. The group were to be paid about £100 per week, which was much more than promoters in Liverpool paid. Williams drove the group and their equipment in his Austin J4 minibus which was loaded by crane onto a ferry at Harwich on 16 August 1960, and landed at Hook of Holland.

All five Beatles, Williams and his wife Beryl, her brother Barry Chang, and "Lord Woodbine" were in the minivan, along with Georg Sterner (Koschmider's translator and future waiter), making a total of ten people, which resulted in a journey that was both uncomfortable and dangerous. As Williams had not obtained German work permits, they were detained at Harwich for five hours. Williams finally convinced the authorities that they were students on holiday, although work permits were later obtained after their arrival in Hamburg.

== The Indra Club ==
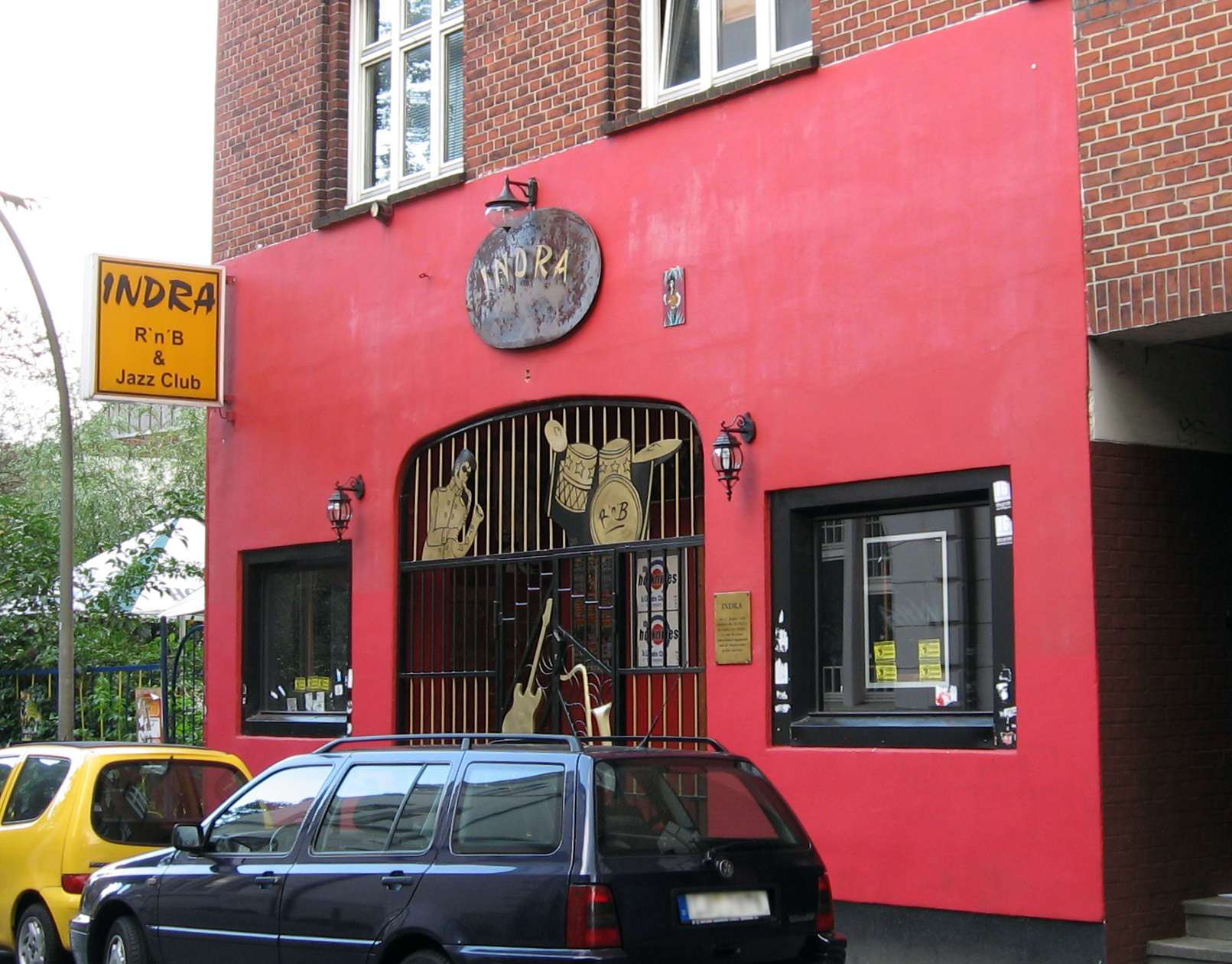
The Indra Club, where The Beatles first played on arriving in Hamburg, as it appeared in 2007.

The Beatles arrived very early in the morning of 17 August 1960, and made their way to the St. Pauli area of Hamburg. The Indra Club (64 Große Freiheit) was closed, so a manager from a neighbouring club found someone to open it up, and the group slept on the red leather seats in the alcoves. The group played at the club on the same night, but were told they could sleep in the storeroom of Bambi Kino (a small cinema), which was cold and in very poor condition (33 Paul-Roosen Straße).

McCartney later said, "We lived backstage in the Bambi Kino, next to the toilets, and you could always smell them. The room had been an old storeroom, and there were just concrete walls and nothing else. No heat, no wallpaper, not a lick of paint; and two sets of bunk beds, with not very much covers—Union Jack flags—we were frozen." Lennon remembered: "We were put in this pigsty. We were living in a toilet, like right next to the ladies' toilet. We'd go to bed late and be woken up next day by the sound of the cinema show and old German fraus [women] pissing next door." After having been awoken in this fashion, the group were then obliged to use cold water from the urinals for washing and shaving. They were paid £2.50 each a day, seven days a week, playing from 8:30–9:30, 10 until 11, 11:30–12:30, and finishing the evening playing from one until two o'clock in the morning. German customers found the group's name comical, as "Beatles" sounded like Low German: Piedel, which is an infantile word for penis.

Pete Best remembered the Indra as being a depressing place that was filled with a few tourists, and having heavy, old, red curtains that made it seem shabby compared to the larger Kaiserkeller, a club also owned by Koschmider and located nearby at 36 Große Freiheit.

== The Kaiserkeller ==
After the closure of the Indra because of complaints about the noise, the Beatles played in the Kaiserkeller, starting on 4 October 1960. Their playing schedule at the Kaiserkeller remained the same as it had been in the Indra. Lennon said: "We had to play for hours and hours on end. Every song lasted twenty minutes and had twenty solos in it. That's what improved the playing. There was nobody to copy from. We played what we liked best and the Germans liked it as long as it was loud." The Beatles had been used to simply standing still when they had performed in Liverpool, but Koschmider would come to the front of the stage and loudly shout "Mach Schau, mach Schau!" ("make [a] show" or, more idiomatically, "put on a show" for the customers). Harrison explained that this prompted Lennon to "dance around like a gorilla, and we'd all knock our heads together." When reminiscing about the harsh conditions they endured, performing 8 hours per day, with little money for salary, and sometimes sleeping in cramped and squalid living quarters, all of which they had to endure for the love of Rock and Roll, Tony Sheridan pointed out with a grin, "We were like slaves".

As Best had been the only one to take O-Level German at school, he could communicate with Koschmider and the clientele better than the rest of the group, and was invited to sing a speciality number called "Peppermint Twist" (while McCartney played the drums) but Best complained that he always felt uncomfortable being at the front of the stage. Willie Limpinski, Koschmider's business manager, decided that the club would attract more customers if it presented continuous live music.

Williams warned the Beatles about the competition they would face by playing in the same club as the Hurricanes (featuring future Beatle Ringo Starr on the drums) by saying, "You'd better pull your socks up because Rory Storm and the Hurricanes are coming in, and you know how good they are. They're going to knock you for six." In early October 1960, Storm and the Hurricanes were free to travel to Hamburg, replacing Derry and the Seniors at the Kaiserkeller. They arrived in Hamburg on 1 October 1960, having negotiated to be paid more than the Seniors or the Beatles. They played five or six 90-minute sets every day, alternating with the Beatles. They were appalled at the living conditions the Beatles and other groups like Howie Casey and the Seniors (who were sleeping in one room at the back of the Kaiserkeller) had to put up with, so they booked into Hamburg's Seamens' Mission.

Horst Fascher (1936-2026) was Koschmider's nightclub bouncer, who had been the 1959 West German featherweight boxing champion, but his career was cut short after he unintentionally killed a sailor in a street fight. He later became a friend of the Beatles, and protected them from drunken customers. Fascher's brother, Fred, sang lead vocals with the group on "Be Bop A Lula", while he sang with them on "Hallelujah I Love Her So", and his alliance with the Beatles continued, as he later went to work at the Star-Club.

=== Lennon's disorderly conduct on stage ===
Lennon occasionally urinated out of his apartment's window onto the street below, and often started arguments with the audience, so that eventually one member of the audience would jump on stage to hit him, but it was Fascher's job to protect Lennon and the group. In some occasions beer bottles were thrown at them.

Fascher remembered Lennon often greeting the audience with a "Heil Hitler", and a Nazi salute: "He'd pull out a black comb and pretend it was a moustache...people laughed."

Astrid Kirchherr remembered that Lennon would make sarcastic remarks from the stage, saying "You Krauts, we won the war", knowing that very few Germans in the audience spoke English, but sailors from English-speaking countries present would roar with laughter.

Lennon was missing for a performance one evening, and Fascher found him in the toilet with a woman. He broke up the tête-à-tête with a bucket of cold water which he threw over them both, and ordered Lennon onto the stage. Lennon was furious, and complained that he could not go on stage dripping wet. Fascher snapped back: "I don't give a shit, you're going onstage and I don't care if you do it naked." A short time later the audience was roaring with laughter. Fascher ran to see what the commotion was, and saw Lennon playing guitar, but only wearing underpants with a toilet seat around his neck. (Epstein later asked Liverpool journalist Bill Harry not to publish photos showing Lennon walking along the Reeperbahn in his underpants).

=== Performance skills improving ===
According to McCartney, Sutcliffe was a "typical art student", with bad skin and pimples, but his reputation grew after he began wearing tight trousers and dark Ray-Ban sunglasses. Sutcliffe's high spot was singing "Love Me Tender". Lennon also started to criticise Sutcliffe; making jokes about Sutcliffe's small stature and playing ability. While Sutcliffe is often described in Beatles' biographies as appearing very uncomfortable onstage, and often playing with his back to the audience, Best denies this, recalling Sutcliffe as usually good-natured and "animated" before an audience.

The Beatles steadily improved during their time in Hamburg, and this was noticed by other musicians who were there at the time. McCartney recalled, "We got better and better and other groups started coming to watch us. The accolade of accolades was when [Tony] Sheridan would come in from the Top Ten (the big club where we aspired to go) or when Rory Storm or Ringo [Starr] would hang around to watch us. 'What'd I Say' was always the one that really got them." The song was often played by the group, once being played for 90 minutes non-stop, with group members walking off stage to wash and drink before returning. Sutcliffe wrote a letter to his mother saying, "We have improved a thousand-fold since our arrival and Allan Williams, who is here at the moment, tells us that there is no group in Liverpool to touch us."

Sheridan explained it in these words: "Of course we were just copying [other people's music] at the beginning you know, we would listen to the record and copying what we heard from playing on stage again, reproducing it and not being original. (...) But there were a few of us who wanted to do more than that, so we put some strange chords in and we played it differently every time; Any song we did, we played it differently, so this version of My Bonnie that you hear on the record with the Beatles, was only one of two or three we did in the studio ... the others are gone, they were lost. So we never did the same song twice, and that kept us from falling down from boredom. (...) After a while I discovered that the German public didn't mind if we changed a few things, if we changed a few chords, we sang it in a different way and of course, we used to play a song, not two minutes 25 seconds, but we used to play one song, sometimes 15 minutes long and in 15 minutes you can do a lot with a song like "What'd I Say", so we were changing the music, we were doing it on purpose—it wasn't an accident, we discovered that you can make something original and authentic out of an old song by doing your own thing and putting your own energy into it your own creativity and being innovative at the same time, and of course you don't get bored that way after playing eight hours a night for months on end."

On Saturday 15 October 1960, Williams arranged a recording session for Lou Walters (of the Hurricanes) at the Akustik Studio, a small booth on the fifth floor of 57 Kirchenallee (The Klockmann-House). Williams asked Lennon, McCartney and Harrison to play and sing harmonies on the recording. Best was in town buying drumsticks, so Starr, the Hurricanes' drummer, played drums. This was the first time Lennon, McCartney, Harrison and Starr recorded together. They recorded three songs: "Fever", "September Song" and "Summertime".

== Top Ten Club ==
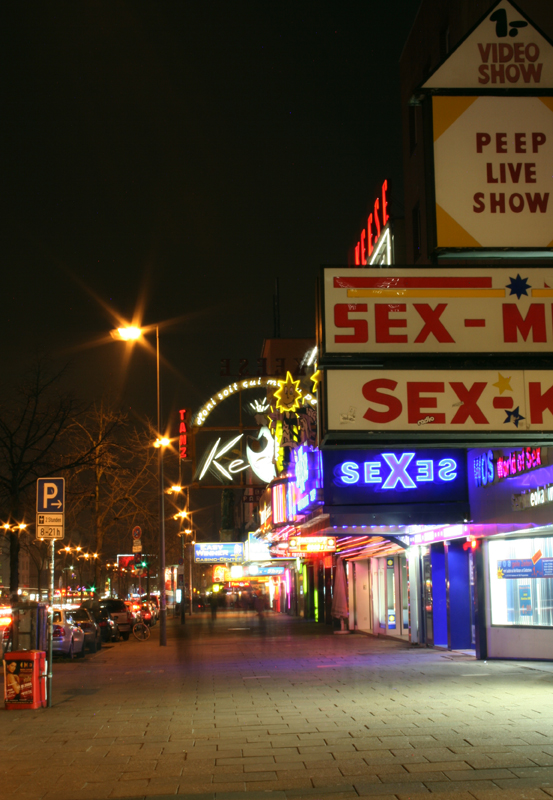
The Reeperbahn

=== Short residency and deportation ===
The Top Ten club was opened on 31 October 1960 by Peter Eckhorn, and was operated by Iain Hines, who was an organist who became a member of Tony Sheridan's band, The Jets.

Tony Sheridan, later remembered the living conditions at the club: "John, George, Paul, Stuart and Pete and I were booked to open the smart Top Ten in the Reeperbahn. We moved into a dormitory over the club and slept in bunks. It was terrible really, now I look back. We all washed our own shirts and socks so the place smelt like a Chinese laundry. But we had great times and I’m afraid we used to tease the life out of the old lady who [took care of] us".

The Beatles, who until 31 December 1960 were under contract with Bruno Koschmider, the owner of Kaiserkeller, often visited Top Ten Club, where Tony Sheridan performed with his Jets. They also played together occasionally, which Bruno Koschmider found out about. In late October 1960, The Beatles left Koschmider's club to work at the Top Ten Club, as Eckhorn offered the group more money, a better PA (with reverb and echo) and a slightly better place to sleep (above the club itself) although by doing so the group broke their contract with Koschmider. Koschmider then reported Harrison for working under the legal age limit (even though he had been working at Koschmider's club) because at the age of 17 he was too young to work in a nightclub after midnight. On 21 November 1960, Harrison was deported back to England. It is assumed that it was Bruno Koschmider who tipped off the police because he was annoyed that the Beatles were unfaithful to him and wanted to switch to the Top Ten Club. Consequently, Harrison had to return to Liverpool.

When Best and McCartney went back to the Bambi Kino to get their belongings, they found it in almost total darkness. As a snub to Koschmider, McCartney and Best found a condom in their luggage, attached it to a nail on the concrete wall of the room, and set fire to it in order to have light to gather their possessions. There was no real damage done, but Koschmider reported them both, and on 29 November 1960, Paul McCartney and Pete Best were arrested for attempted arson. McCartney: "One evening we were just walking down the Reeperbahn, when we heard this 'ta-ti-ti-ta', and then 'Komm mit mir!' ('Come with me!')".

Best and McCartney spent three hours in the Davidwache Police Station, and were deported on 1 December 1960. Lennon's work permit was revoked a few days later and he went home by train, but as Sutcliffe had a cold, he stayed in Hamburg. Sutcliffe later borrowed money from Kirchherr (his German girlfriend) for the airfare back to Liverpool in early January 1961. Back in Liverpool, no one contacted each other for two weeks, but Best and his mother made numerous phone calls to Hamburg to recover the group's equipment.

=== Back in Liverpool, short residency at the Casbah ===
Back in Liverpool, the group played an engagement on 17 December 1960, at the Casbah Coffee Club, with Chas Newby substituting for Sutcliffe, playing bass with them for four shows. Newby was shocked at the vast improvement of their playing and singing after the residency in Hamburg, and was struck by how powerful Best's drumming now was, pushing the group to play harder and louder. (It was probably due to McCartney that Best developed a loud drumming style, as he would often tell Best in Hamburg to "Crank it up").

=== Return to the Top Ten ===
After Harrison turned 18 and the immigration problems had been solved, the Beatles went back to Hamburg for a second residency at the Top Ten Club, playing from 27 March to 2 July 1961. To secure their return, Eckhorn paid 158 Deutschmarks to the German authorities, which was the cost of deporting McCartney and Best back to Liverpool the previous winter.

The Beatles appeared back at the Top Ten Club with Tony Sheridan from 1 April to 1 July 1961; together they performed there for 92 nights consecutively. They were to play a total of 503 hours on stage, playing seven hours a night and eight hours at weekends, with a fifteen-minute pause every hour. Each member of the band was to be paid 35 deutschmarks (per night?))

Sutcliffe decided to leave the Beatles to concentrate on his art studies and to be with Kirchherr, so McCartney (reluctantly) took over as bass player for the group. Sutcliffe later enrolled at the Hamburg College of Art under the tutelage of the pop artist Eduardo Paolozzi. Sutcliffe lent McCartney his Höfner President 500/5 model bass guitar but asked McCartney not to change the strings around, so McCartney had to play it with the strings arranged backwards, until he could buy a specially made left-handed Höfner bass of his own. McCartney bought his first Höfner Violin bass guitar (model 500/1) from the Steinway-Haus Music Store (Colonnaden 29) for £30 (equivalent to £600 in 2025); he could not afford a Fender since they cost around £100 (equivalent to £1,900 in 2025). Lennon bought a 1958 Rickenbacker 325 Capri guitar prior to Sutcliffe's departure and Harrison bought a Gibson amplifier.

The matching lilac jackets, made by McCartney's next-door neighbour in Liverpool to be worn as stage clothes, were soon threadbare, as were any other items of clothing, so the group bought cowboy boots, jeans and black leather jackets and trousers, from Paul Hundertmark's (Spielbudenplatz 9) and a tailor's shop at Thadenstraße 6. Lennon said: "We had a bit more money the second time so we bought leather pants ... we looked like four Gene Vincents."

== The Star-Club ==
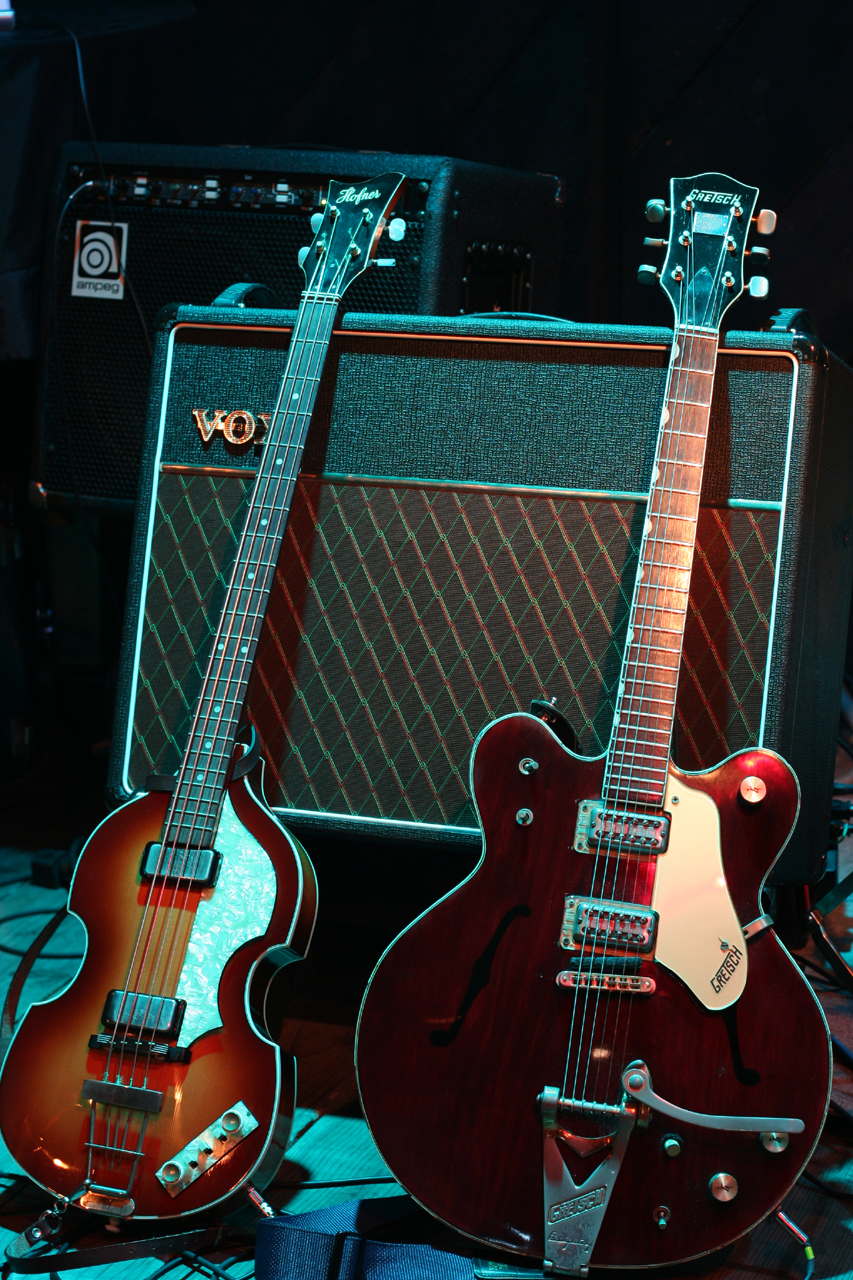
Replicas of McCartney's Höfner Violin bass and Harrison's Gretsch Country Gentleman guitar (erroneous, since he would have been using the Duo Jet during shows at the Star-Club) leant against a Vox AC30

On 13 April 1962, the Beatles were booked as the opening act for the launch of a new club. The Star-Club, opened by Manfred Weissleder, had a capacity for two thousand people, as well as cinema-style seating. When the Beatles were booked to play there, Neil Aspinall left his job to become the Beatles' permanent road manager, as he was earning more money driving them around than he was earning by being an accountant. The Beatles returned to Hamburg by plane to play from 13 April to 31 May 1962. Upon their arrival, they were informed of Sutcliffe's death.

By the time of their second Star-Club visit from 1–14 November 1962, Ringo Starr had become the group's drummer. The Beatles stayed at the Hotel Germania (Detlev-Bremer-Straße 8), having the luxury of single rooms for the first time, and then stayed at the Hotel Pacific (Neuer Pferdemarkt 30) for another booking from 18 to 31 December 1962. Harrison said: "We came back to play the Star-Club, a big place and fantastic because it had a great sound system. This time we had a hotel. I remember it was quite a long walk from the club, at the top of the Reeperbahn going back towards the city." Portions of their final performances were taped with a portable recorder by an associate of Ted "King Size" Taylor of the Dominoes, another group playing at the club. The tapes were released on West Germany's Bellaphon label in 1977 as The Beatles: Live! at the Star-Club in Hamburg, Germany; 1962, and subsequently re-released in various formats and titles.

The set list at the Star-Club (with the lead singer in parentheses):

- "I Saw Her Standing There" (McCartney)
- "Roll Over Beethoven" (Harrison)
- "Hippy Hippy Shake" (McCartney)
- "Sweet Little Sixteen" (Lennon)
- "Lend Me Your Comb" (Lennon)
- "Your Feet's Too Big" (McCartney)
- "Red Sails in the Sunset" (McCartney)
- "Everybody's Trying to Be My Baby" (Harrison)
- "Matchbox" (Lennon)
- "Talkin' 'bout You" (Lennon)
- "Shimmy Shimmy" (McCartney)
- "Long Tall Sally" (McCartney)
- "I Remember You" (McCartney)
- "I'm Gonna Sit Right Down and Cry (Over You)" (Lennon)
- "Where Have You Been All My Life" (Lennon)
- "Twist and Shout" (Lennon)
- "Mr. Moonlight" (Lennon)
- "A Taste of Honey" (McCartney)
- "Besame Mucho" (McCartney)
- "Reminiscing" (Harrison)
- "Kansas City" (McCartney)
- "Nothin' Shakin' But the Leaves on a Tree" (Harrison)
- "To Know Her is to Love Her" (Harrison or Lennon)
- "Little Queenie" (McCartney)
- "Falling in Love Again" (McCartney)
- "Ask Me Why" (Lennon)
- "Hallelujah I Love Her So" (club manager Horst Fascher)
- "Be-Bop-A-Lula" (Fred Fascher, Horst's brother)
- "Till There Was You" (McCartney)
- "Sheila" (Harrison)

== Record release ==
The first recording of the Beatles ever released was the single "My Bonnie", made in Hamburg with Tony Sheridan, who also had a residency at the Top Ten club. He recruited the band to act as his backing group on a series of recordings for the West German Polydor Records label, the tracks produced by the bandleader Bert Kaempfert. On 22 June 1961, Sheridan and the Beatles drove to Hamburg-Harburg (about 30 minutes from Hamburg) to the Friedrich-Ebert-Halle (auditorium/hall) and were paid 330 Deutschmarks (about $75) for the recording. Kaempfert signed the group to a one-year Polydor contract at the first session on 22 June 1961. There were subsequent recording sessions on 23 June and in May 1962.

On 31 October 1961, Polydor released "My Bonnie" (Mein Herz ist bei dir nur), appearing on the West German charts under the name "Tony Sheridan and the Beat Brothers"—a generic name used for whoever happened to be in Sheridan's backup group. McCartney later explained: "They didn't like our name and said, 'Change to the Beat Brothers, this is more understandable for the German audience.' We went along with it... it was a record." The song was later released in the UK, on 5 January 1962. A few copies were also pressed on the American Decca Records label.

== Associates and social circle ==
Astrid Kirchherr, Klaus Voormann, and Jürgen Vollmer were early fans of the Beatles after they heard the group play in the Kaiserkeller. Kirchherr, Voormann's girlfriend, was initially horrified at the idea of spending any time in such a sordid district, but Voormann, after watching the Beatles several times without her, eventually persuaded her to come too. After having previously only listened to trad jazz, the Platters and Nat King Cole, the Rock n' Roll that the Beatles played was totally new to them. The three friends visited the Kaiserkeller almost every night, arriving at 9 o'clock and sitting by the front of the stage. Kirchherr, then 22 years old, later said: "It was like a merry-go-round in my head, they looked absolutely astonishing. ... My whole life changed in a couple of minutes. All I wanted was to be with them and to know them." Sutcliffe was fascinated by Kirchherr and Harry later wrote that when Kirchherr walked in, every head would immediately turn her way. Sutcliffe wrote to a friend that he could hardly take his eyes off her when she had first walked into the club and tried to talk to her during the next break, but she had already left.

Kirchherr asked the Beatles if they would mind letting her take photographs of them in a photo session, which impressed them, as other groups only had snapshots that were taken by friends. The next morning Kirchherr took photographs in a fairground park called "Der Dom" which was close to the Reeperbahn. Kirchherr started dating Sutcliffe, and they were engaged in November 1960.

Kirchherr is credited with inventing the Beatles' moptop haircut, although she personally disagreed. In 1995, she told BBC Radio Merseyside: "All my friends in art school used to run around with this sort of what you call Beatles' haircut ... and my boyfriend then, Klaus Voormann, he had this hairstyle, and Stuart [Sutcliffe] liked it very very much. And he was the first one who really got the nerve to get the Brylcreem out of his hair and asking me to cut his hair for him. ... Pete [Best] has got very curly hair and it doesn't work." After suffering blackouts and intense headaches, Sutcliffe was taken to a hospital on 10 April 1962—Kirchherr rode with him in the ambulance—but died before the ambulance reached the hospital. Three days later Kirchherr met the Beatles at the Hamburg airport and told them Sutcliffe had died of a brain haemorrhage.

In 1966, Voormann was asked by Lennon to design the sleeve for the Beatles' album Revolver (much later, Voorman played bass on solo recordings by Lennon, McCartney, Harrison, and Starr). In 1995, Voormann designed the artwork for the three-volume CD sets in The Beatles Anthology series. In 1999, Kirchherr published a book called Hamburg Days (a two-volume limited edition) containing a set of photographs by Kirchherr and "memory drawings" by Voormann of the Beatles time in Hamburg.

== Later years ==
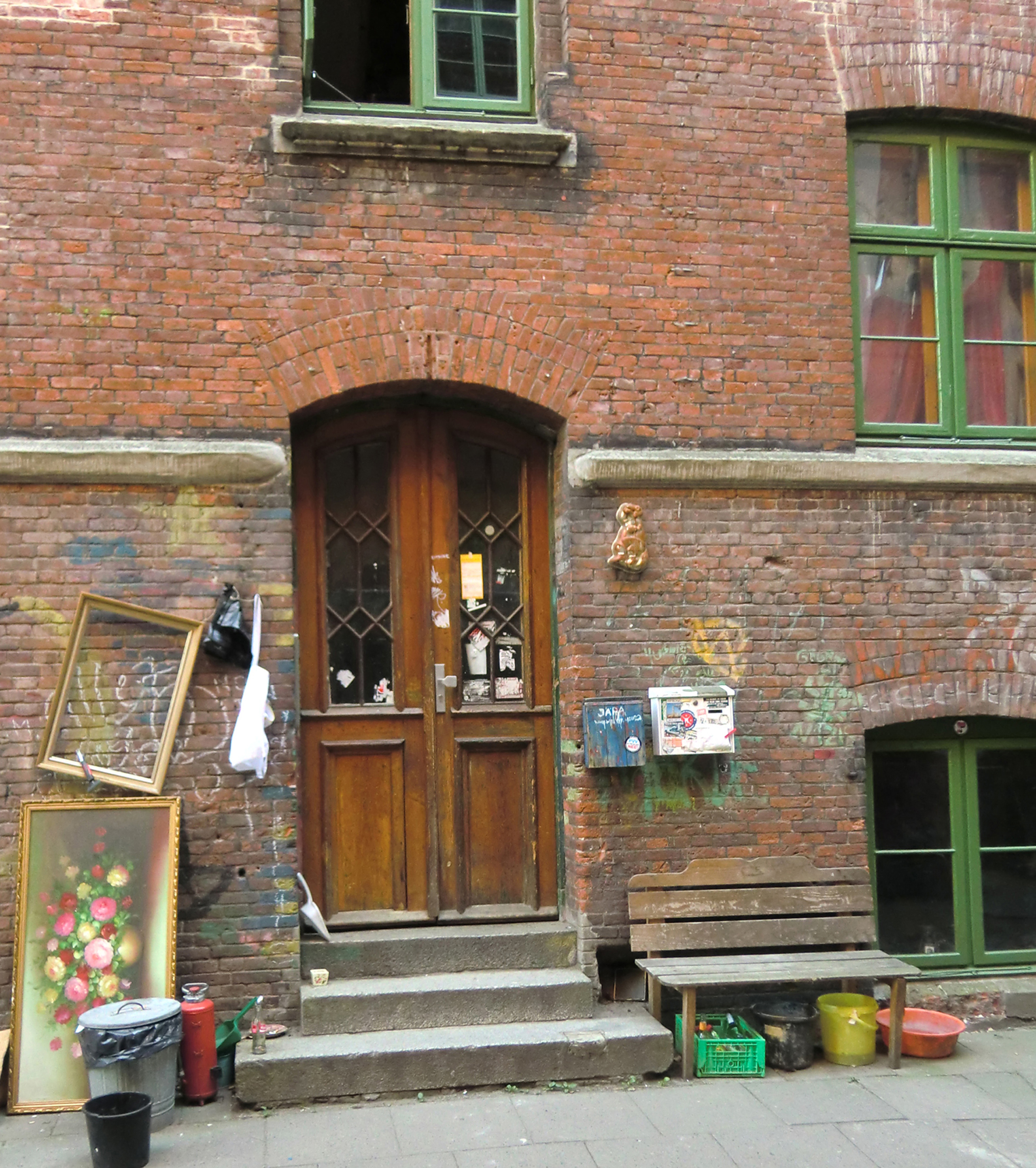
The doorway of Jäger-Passage, Wohlwillstraße 22, as it looks today

The Beatles returned to Hamburg in June 1966, staying at the Tremsbüttel castle (Schlosstraße 10), and played two concerts in the Ernst-Merck-Halle on 26 and 27 June. Lennon later said, "I might have been born in Liverpool, but I grew up in Hamburg".

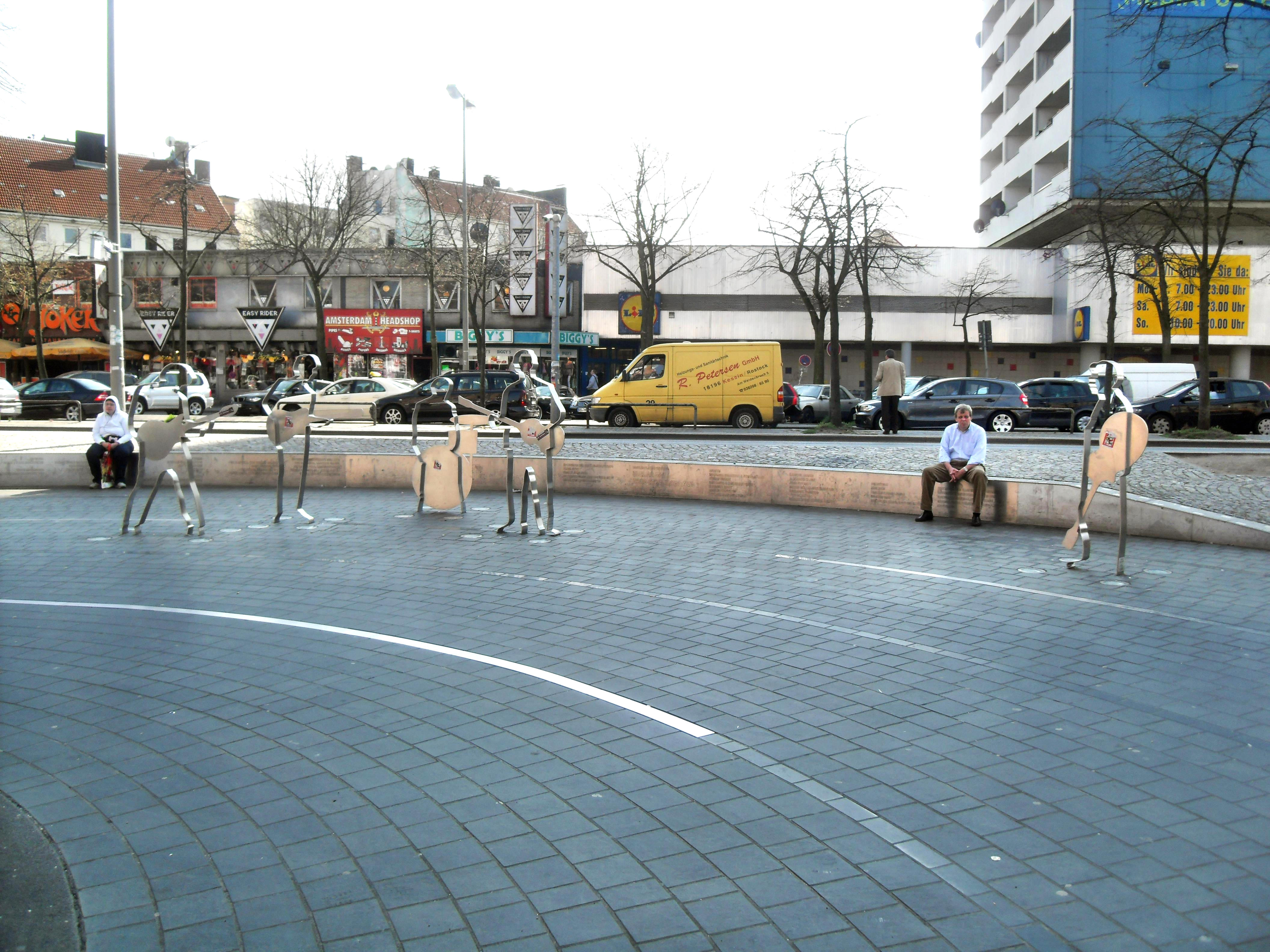
Five silhouettes on Beatles-Platz commemorating Lennon, McCartney, Harrison, and Sutcliffe. The drummer could be either Starr or Best.

Lennon posed in front of the door of Jäger-Passage at Wohlwillstraße 22 for a photograph which was later used on the covers of his Rock 'n' Roll and Rock 'n' Roll Sessions albums. The photo was taken by Jürgen Vollmer, during the time The Beatles were playing at the Top Ten club. Individual Beatles later commented about their memories of Hamburg, with Lennon reflecting, "We'd outlived the Hamburg stage and wanted to pack that up. We hated going back to Hamburg those last two times. We'd had that scene. Brian [Epstein] made us go back to fulfill the contract". Harrison had positive memories of the period: "I'd have to say with hindsight that Hamburg bordered on the best of Beatles times. We didn't have any luxury, we didn't have any bathrooms or any clothes, we were pretty grubby, we couldn't afford anything, but on the other hand we weren't yet famous, so we didn't have to contend with the bullshit that comes with fame." McCartney was philosophical: "Hamburg was certainly a great childhood memory. But I think all things are enhanced by time. It was very exciting, though I think it felt better to me a little later in our career, once we'd started to get a bit of success with the records."

A memorial square, Beatles-Platz, was constructed in Hamburg in 2008 at the meeting of Reeperbahn and Große Freiheit streets, containing five stainless steel sculptures of the Beatles. Construction costs amounted to €550,000 ($776,000), of which €200,000 was provided by sponsors and donors. The idea of creating a memorial to the Beatles had been initiated in 2001 by Hamburg radio station Oldie 95. Hamburg's Mayor, Ole von Beust, said at the opening, "It is about time that Hamburg commemorated this great group." The square when illuminated resembles a spinning turntable. Because the band members are shown only in outline form, the figure of the drummer can be either Best or Starr.

== See also ==
- Outline of the Beatles
- The Beatles timeline
