= Disc (magazine) =

British popular music magazine

- Cover of the 11 June 1966 issue, depicting the Beatles
- Categories: Music
- Frequency: Weekly
- First issue: 8 February 1958; 68 years ago
- Final issue: 30 August 1975
- Country: United Kingdom
- Based in: London
- Language: English

Disc was a weekly British popular music magazine, published between 1958 and 1975. It changed name to Disc Weekly from 1964 to 1966, and then, from 1966, after taking over Music Echo magazine (which had itself previously taken over Mersey Beat) it was known as Disc and Music Echo , reverting to Disc in 1972. In 1975 it was taken over by Record Mirror and ceased to exist.

== Background ==
The magazine was first published on 8 February 1958, with the main competition being Record Mirror. It gained a reputation for its emphasis on pop music as reflected in the music charts, in comparison with its more music-industry-focused rivals Melody Maker and New Musical Express. Its pop music charts were based on its own sample of shops, initially no more than 25 in number, but expanding to about 100 by the mid-1960s. It also awarded silver discs (for UK sales of 250,000) from 1959 until 1973. Silver records were awarded after professionally audited sales data was provided by record companies. In 1973, Disc's awards were superseded by the British Phonographic Industry (BPI). It was renamed Disc Weekly between 5 December 1964 and 16 April 1966.

In 1966, it was incorporated with Music Echo magazine, which had itself previously taken over Mersey Beat. The new magazine was known as Disc and Music Echo (with the name "Disc" shown more prominently on the masthead), from 23 April 1966. Unlike the other weekly magazines of the time, it featured colour photos on its front and back pages. According to journalist Jon Savage, it featured "bang-up-to-the-minute news stories on the front page, race-track-style chart rundowns ... a contentious readers' postbag... and incisive singles reviews by the great Penny Valentine". In June 1966, it was the first magazine to feature, in colour, the notorious "butcher" cover for the Beatles' US album Yesterday and Today, under the headline "Beatles: What a Carve-up!"

Contributors to the magazine included Jack Good, in the early 1960s and, later in the decade, John Peel. A cartoonist in the 1970s was J Edward Oliver, who continued in Record Mirror from 1975 to 1977. Disc dropped the name Music Echo from its title in 1972, and continued to be published until 30 August 1975, when it merged with Record Mirror. Musicians Marc Bolan, Paul McCartney, Mike Batt and others wrote them personal notes lamenting their closure.
