= Middle Shooks Run =

Neighborhood in Colorado Springs, Colorado

Coordinates: 38°50′30″N 104°48′40″W

The Middle Shooks Run neighborhood is located in the city of Colorado Springs, Colorado, United States. The neighborhood's boundaries are Uintah Street to the north, Hancock Avenue to the east, Pikes Peak Avenue to the south, and Wahsatch Avenue to the west. Adjacent to the east side of downtown Colorado Springs, the neighborhood is bisected by the middle section of Shooks Run (creek) and Shooks Run Trail running north to south through the neighborhood.

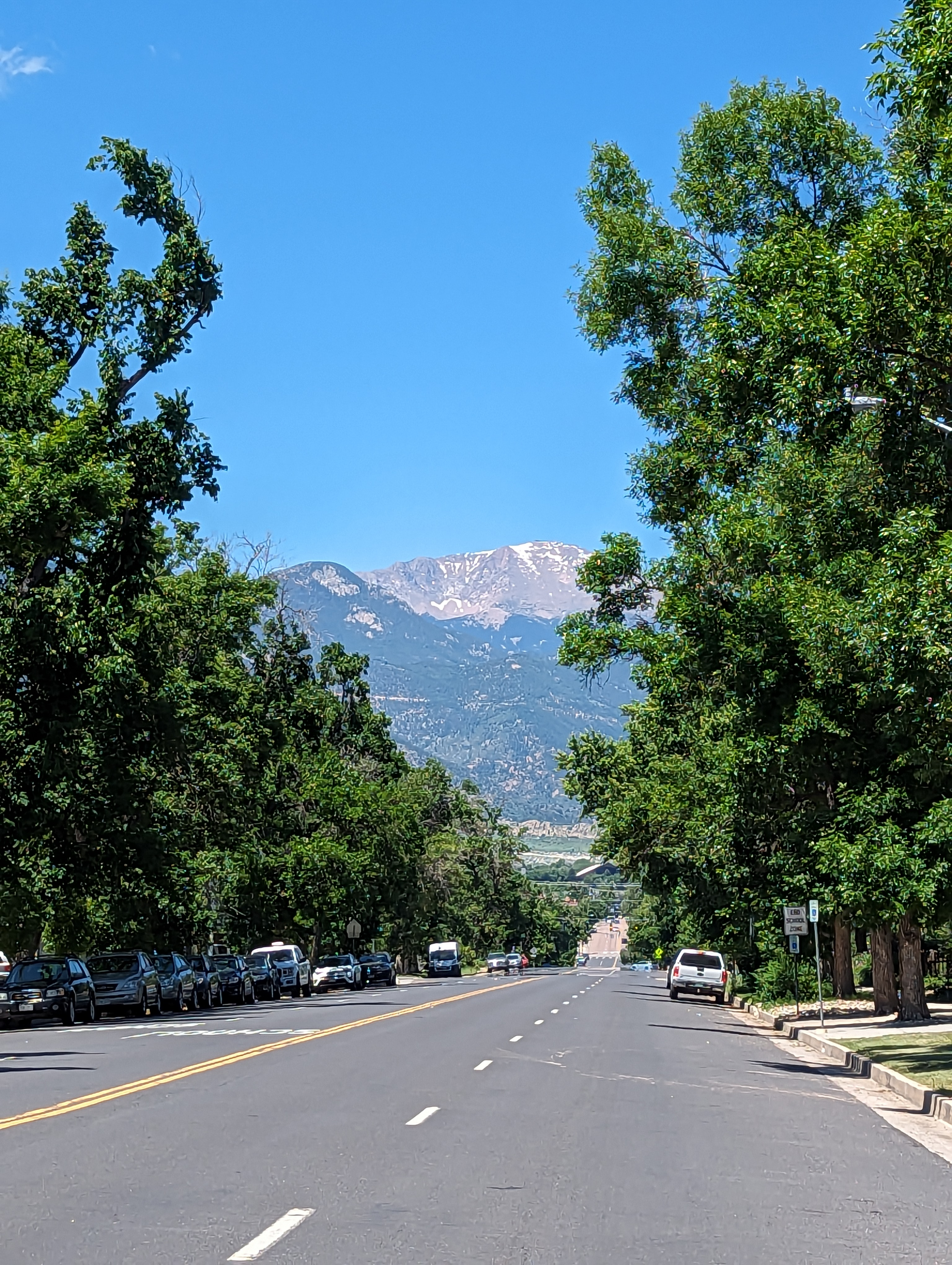
View of Pikes Peak from Middle Shooks Run

Middle Shooks Run is home to several notable locations, businesses, and organizations that have become staples of the local community. UCHealth Memorial Hospital Central is noted as being one of the busiest hospitals in Colorado Springs, while the Mid Shooks Run Community Garden has become a popular staple of MSR and the surrounding area. Several historical properties such as the Fannie Mae Duncan House, the Colorado School for the Deaf and Blind, and the People's Methodist Episcopal Church all lie within its boundaries. Adding to the historical ambiance of the neighborhood is the fact many houses in Middle Shooks Run are over 100 years old.

== History ==
The small creek known as Shooks Run was named after brothers Denton and Peter Shook who brought cattle from Iowa and had a patent on 80 acres of ranchland in 1865 at the confluence of Fountain Creek and the creek now known as Shooks Run.

The stream's water originated on the Austin Bluffs and ran south from there through the Patty Jewett, Shooks Run, and Hillside neighborhoods into Fountain Creek. After several serious flood events, water on the upper stretch was diverted to Monument Creek and today Shooks Run originates from the Patty Jewett Golf Course. Shooks Run Park is a linear park extending from Cache LaPoudre Street to Pikes Peak Avenue and includes the creek and Shooks Run Trail (part of the Legacy Loop). Frank "Prairie Dog" O'Byrne Park and Frank Waters Park are also adjacent to the creek. In 1887, the Atchison, Topeka and Santa Fe Railroad laid tracks from Denver to Pueblo through the Shooks Run neighborhood. The last train on the Santa Fe tracks ceased in 1970 and the right of way was converted to Shooks Run Trail— an early rails-to-trails project. The pedestrian bridge over Cache La Poudre Street is supported by the railroad's concrete abutments (now painted with mural by neighbors and Concrete Couch) that were laid in 1917-18. As the city grew after its founding in 1871, much of the increased population was housed in new additions to the east of downtown. By 1898, the population was sufficient for building Columbia Elementary four-room school (later added to) on the northwest corner of Boulder and Institute Streets.

By December 1902, the streetcar line was extended to the neighborhood. The Institute streetcar line ran from downtown eastward on Platte to Institute Street, then north on Institute to East Uintah Street. The streetcars ran until 1932.

In the 1970s, as a response to proposed changes to the area by the city of Colorado Springs, the Middle Shooks Run Neighborhood Association was formed to represent the interests of those living in the community. In 2021, representatives from Middle Shooks Run were part of a coalition of historic neighborhoods (including the Old North End, the Near North End, Mesa Springs, and Bonnyville) that joined together to form the Historic Neighborhoods Partnership.

== Notable structures ==
=== Churches ===
Boulder Street Church – 828 E Boulder Street

Recognizing the need for a new church on the east side of the city, several Presbyterian churches joined together to contribute funds to construct this distinguished brick building and in1903 the original congregation moved in. The building housed Presbyterian congregations for many years before becoming the home of People's United Methodist Episcopal Church. The People's church moved in 1966 from their location just west of Shooks Run at 601 E St Vrain. Then in 2003 the congregation relocated and put the church up for sale. New Life Church purchased the building and Marcus Haggard led the church. In 2008 Joseph Winger led the Boulder Street Church and in early 2009 New Life Church transferred ownership to a separate independent church. Church services continue today in the building. Extensive restoration of the interior was done. The original stained glass windows grace the interior on three walls.

People's Methodist Episcopal Church – 527 E. St Vrain Street

On land donated by General Palmer, the building dates from 1904 when there were at least 75 black families living in the north part of the city. The church served as a meeting place for religious, civil and social organizations including People's Methodist Episcopal Church (from 1904 to 1965), the local headquarters for the Universal Negro Improvement Association (from 1921 to mid-1930s), People's Literary Society, DuBois Study Club, Ladies Aid Society, Women's Home Missionary Society, Colorado Springs Unity Council, and National Association for the Advancement of Colored People. The building is registered as a national and state historic property, and has been converted from civic use to residential. The wooden structure has distinctive Queen Anne and Gothic Revival style elements.

=== Schools ===
North Middle School – 612 E. Yampa

Funded with a $1.1 million school bond issue in 1922, this was one of three junior high schools built at that time along with West and South (demolished). All three were designed by William Ittner, a premier school architect of the 1920s. The exterior (Spanish Colonial Revival) was designed by Thomas P Barber, one of the most popular architects over several decades. The school adopted the college-prep International Baccalaureate World School program in 2012 which emphasizes a global education perspective and service projects.

Colorado School for the Deaf and Blind – 33 N. Institute

Established on this site in 1876, the School is the only school in the state dedicated solely to the education of the deaf and the blind. When first built, it was surrounded by empty land east of the city. Ten campus buildings, constructed between 1906 and 1952 of Castle Rock rhyolite, exhibit a high degree of craftsmanship and design reflecting an eclectic mix of architectural styles. Local architects Thomas Barber, Elmer Nieman, and Edward Bunts helped define the look of the campus over the first half of the twentieth century. In March 1950 the main academic building, built of stone in 1889, was destroyed by fire.

Columbia Elementary School – 835 E. St. Vrain Street (Formerly 840 E. Boulder)

As the town of Colorado Springs was spreading to the east, a need arose for a school east of the Santa Fe Railroad tracks. Bonds were issues for a two-story brick building on the northeast corner of Boulder and Institute Streets. By 1898 four rooms of the building had been completed at a cost of $20,000. The size of the school was doubled in 1902 with the addition of four more rooms. After other additions the building had six classrooms on the first floor and six classrooms on the second floor. The gym was in the basement. The site of the school had been donated to the city by General Palmer and the Colorado Springs Company.

The first Columbia School, at 840 East Boulder Street was demolished in the summer of 1972, and a new one-story brick buildings was erected on the north side of the lots at 835 East St. Vrain Street. The new school, built at a total cost of $417,424, was erected in two parts, with Gordon Ingraham drawing up the plans for the 1969 addition and Walter Burgess designing the 1972 addition.

=== Residences ===
Fannie Mae Duncan house – 615 N. Corona Street

Fannie Mae Duncan (1918–2005) was a successful black businesswoman in a field dominated by white men. Her stately home on Corona Street with 42 rooms was built in 1891 for Dr. James A. Hart and was originally located at Nevada and Dale Street. The house was a bit past its prime and marked for demolition in 1952 when Mrs. Duncan bought it and had it moved. It was so large it had to be cut into three parts so that it could be moved to the vacant lots on Corona which were in the "right neighborhood" according to Colorado Springs unspoken rules of racial segregation. Fannie Mae welcomed black entertainers who performed at her very successful Cotton Club (located downtown on Colorado Avenue) to stay at her home. Flower and vegetable gardens surrounded the house as well as an orchard. Mrs. Duncan (hosted many receptions, social events and fundraisers in her home).

Edwin and Lulu Sawyer house – 805 E. Boulder St.

This two and a half-story Queen Anne-style home was built in 1891 for Edwin A Sawyer, a civil engineer and surveyor. Sawyer was in business with William Garstin, Civil and Mining Engineers, U.S. Mineral Surveyors, Irrigation Engineering, Blueprint and Drafting Departments, based in the Hagerman Building, Colorado Springs. Sawyer married Lulu Wilcox in 1895 in a small wedding held at the home of the bride's cousin at 708 E. Boulder by Rev. James Gregg, First Congregational Church. Mrs. Sawyer was on the Board of Education and very active in local civic groups. The Sawyers lived here until Lulu's death in 1910. The property has a carriage house, iron fence and rock wall with distinctive chimney and porch. By the 1940s, the building was divided into apartments.

Joseph Dozier/Frank Waters house – 435 E. Bijou St.

Joseph Dozier (1842–1925) was a contractor and builder for many years. In 1874 he took over Winfield Scott Stratton's carpenter shop after Stratton struck it rich with the Independence Mine in Cripple Creek. Stratton had lived at 513 E. Kiowa Street (no longer existing). Dozier may have built this house before moving his family here in 1892. Dozier was well known in Colorado Springs (he built Nicola Tesla's barn east of the city) and his grandson, Frank Waters (1902–1995), gained even more prominence as an author. Waters lived much of his boyhood with his grandfather and wrote a trilogy of semi-autobiographical books featuring Dozier as a central character. Note the house's front bay which is carried through the second story; bracketing under the roofline and under the gables; decorative shingles; the evenly turned column on the second story porch is unusual; and the ground floor's flared porch columns also unusual on a house this age.
