= Shaked (surname) =

Shaked (Hebrew: שָׁקֵד, meaning almond) is a surname. Notable people with the surname include:

- Ayelet Shaked (born 1976), Israeli activist and politician
- Emmanuel Shaked (1930–2018), Israeli general
- Gershon Shaked (1929–2006), Austrian-Israeli scholar and critic of Hebrew literature
- Mor Shaked (born 1986), Israeli footballer
- Moshe Shaked (1945–2014), American mathematician and statistician
- Shira Shaked (born 1981), Israeli concert pianist and musician
- Tal Shaked (born 1978), American chess grandmaster
- Uri Shaked (born 1943), Israeli professor of Electrical Engineering at Tel Aviv University
- Ziki Shaked (born 1955), Israeli round-the-world sailor and sailing instructor

== See also ==
- Mandel
- Mandelbaum
