= Milkshake (disambiguation) =

A milkshake is a beverage typically made with blended milk and ice cream.

Milkshake may also refer to:

== Music ==
=== Performers ===
- Milkshake (band), an American band nominated for a Grammy Award for Best Musical Album for Children in 2010
- MilkShake, a girl group from Thailand featuring singer Pornnappan Pornpenpipat
- Thee Milkshakes, a UK punk band founded by Billy Childish

=== Other music ===
- "Milkshake", by Red Velvet from The ReVe Festival: Day 1, 2019
- "Milkshake", by Village People from Can't Stop the Music, 1980
- "Milkshake" (song), a 2003 song by Kelis
- Milkshake (EP), an EP by Jaws
- Milkshake, a 2018 single album by the Fanatics subunit Flavor

== Other uses ==
- Milkshake!, a British children's programming block on Channel 5
- Milk Shakes (Washington), a mountain in the U.S. state of Washington
- Milk Shake candy bar produced by the Hollywood Candy Company.
