= The Shake (dance) =

1960s fad dance

The Shake was a fad dance of mid-1960s, characteristic of "tense jerkiness" of limbs and head shaking, basically with no particular danced moves or steps.

It superseded the twist in popularity by 1965. It was an individualistic dance, with no steps, legs trembling, arms arbitrarily gesticulating and head shaking. No partner was necessary. Part of the "mod" subculture, it evolved from the blue beat style and was danced under the loud and hypnotic music of rhythm and blues typified by Chuck Berry. Frances Rust cites a description by a contemporary who mentioned "feeling like being very drunk" under in influence of the ostinato beat of the electric guitar, as an anecdotal support for research of the influence of music on central nervous system.

The central theme from the British TV series The Avengers is based on The Shake LP (1965) by Laurie Johnson, which capitalized on the dance craze of the time.

== See also ==
- Shake (disambiguation), The Shake (disambiguation) for songs of the title
