= Wandering heart =

Fault in timber

Wandering heart is a fault in timber, where the heart of the tree wanders from side to side, rather than remaining central. This is usually caused by sustained winds. The resulting boards are twisted and short grained, and not suitable for construction due to their tendency to warp, and their weakness.

== See also ==
- Shakes (timber)
