= Derry and the Seniors =

British rock band (1960–1962)

- Derry and the Seniors in 1961. Left to right: Derry Wilkie, Howie Casey, Frank Wibberley, Brian Griffiths, Freddie Starr, Phil Whitehead

Background information
- Also known as: Howie Casey and the Seniors
- Origin: Liverpool, England
- Genres: Merseybeat, rock and roll
- Years active: 1960–1962
- Label: Fontana
- Past members: Derry Wilkie; Howie Casey; Billy Hughes; Stan Foster; Brian Griffiths; Phil Whitehead; Geoff Wallington; Frank Wibberley; Freddie Fowell; Lu Walters; Kenny Hardin

Derry and the Seniors were a British rock and roll group of the early 1960s. They were the first band from Liverpool to play the club scene in Germany, paving the way for The Beatles and others. As Howie Casey and the Seniors, they were also the first Liverpool group to record an LP, and featured singer Freddie Fowell, later known as Freddie Starr.

== Career ==
Derry Wilkie (10 January 1941 – 22 December 2001) was a black British singer born in Kent Gardens, in the inner city area of Liverpool. According to local journalist Bill Harry, Wilkie's real name was Richard Derek Wilkie. In 1959, he began singing with a local rock and roll group, the Hy-Tones, who split up at the end of the year. A new band, the Seniors, was then formed by three members of the group—Howie Casey (saxophone), Billy Hughes (rhythm guitar), and Stan Foster (piano)—together with Brian Griffiths (lead guitar), Phil Whitehead (bass) and Jeff Wallington (drums). Wilkie joined as lead singer, and for the next year the band was usually billed as Derry and the Seniors.

They performed in local venues around Merseyside, and in May 1960, after appearing in a show headed by Gene Vincent, were invited to audition for the role of backing band for Liverpool star Billy Fury. Although they did not win the audition, they were invited by The Beatles manager, Alan Williams to go to London to perform at the 2i's Coffee Bar in Soho. A few weeks later, they played at the 2i's, and happened to be seen there by Bruno Koschmider, a visiting German club owner who was looking for acts that he could use in his Hamburg club, the Kaiserkeller. The Seniors travelled to Germany and played regularly in Hamburg over the summer of 1960, later being joined there by rival Liverpool group, the Beatles. However, as the group members did not have work permits or visas, they were repatriated to the UK in October 1960. They continued to play local clubs and venues around Liverpool for the rest of 1960, but at the end of the year Wallington and Hughes decided to leave.

At the start of 1961, the group reformed using the name Howie Casey and the Seniors, with Frank Wibberley on drums, and Wilkie sharing vocals with Freddie Fowell. They then signed a recording deal with Fontana Records, becoming the first beat group from Liverpool to record an LP. The album, Twist At The Top, was issued in February 1962, together with a single, "Double Twist". Two further singles followed in 1962, "I Ain't Mad At You" and "The Boll Weevil Song", but they were not hits. Over the next few months, Whitehead left, and continued his career as a Civil Engineer but still continued to play on the local scene, emigrating first to Rhodesia, then South Africa, then Australia, before settling in San Francisco and eventually establishing and operating a successful engineering company. Whitehead was replaced by a succession of bass players including Lu Walters, and Wibberley also left to be replaced by drummer Kenny Hardin, before the group finally broke up in mid 1962.

== Later activities ==
After the split, Wilkie joined Wallasey group, the Pressmen, whose members initially included Richie Prescott (lead guitar), Bob Pears (bass), Phil Kenzie (saxophone), Dave Roberts (saxophone), and Tommy Bennett (drums - later replaced by Aynsley Dunbar). Derry Wilkie and the Pressmen recorded one track on the Oriole album, This Is Merseybeat, in 1963. However, the group split up in early 1964, and Wilkie formed another band, usually billed as "Derry Wilkie and the Others", with Kenzie, Bennett, Ernie Hayes (guitar), and Bob Montgomery (bass). After touring in the UK, and playing clubs in Germany, they supported The Alan Price Set at the Marquee Club in London, in November 1965, billed as Derry Wilkie and the Pressmen. They then worked as the Savages with Screaming Lord Sutch, before the group split up in 1966. Wilkie gave up the music business soon afterwards. He later lived in Italy and in London, and died in 2001.

Howie Casey joined Kingsize Taylor and the Dominoes, mainly playing in Germany. After that group split up, he toured in Europe with German-based band The Krew, before returning to the UK in 1970. He played as a session musician for Marc Bolan and others, before recording the album Band on the Run with Paul McCartney and Wings, and recorded and toured worldwide with McCartney until the end of the 1970s.

Freddie Fowell changed his name to Freddie Starr, and led several Liverpool beat groups including Freddie Starr and the Midnighters, before appearing on the TV talent show Opportunity Knocks and then becoming one of the UK's leading comic performers in the 1970s and 1980s.

An expanded CD version of the album Twist At The Top by Howie Casey and the Seniors was released by Bear Family Records in 2010.
