= Mersey Beat =

English music publication

- Type: Fortnightly newspaper
- Format: Tabloid
- Owner: Bill Harry
- Editor: Bill and Virginia Harry
- Founded: 6 July 1961
- Ceased publication: 1964
- Headquarters: 81a Renshaw Street, Liverpool

Mersey Beat was a music publication in Liverpool, England in the early 1960s. It was founded by Bill Harry, who was one of John Lennon's classmates at Liverpool Art College. The paper carried news about all the local Liverpool bands, and stars who came to town to perform.

The Beatles had a close association with Mersey Beat, which carried many exclusive stories and photos of them. It also published several of Lennon's early writings, including a history of the band, and occasional comical classified advertisements by him as space filler.

== Beginnings ==
A fellow student, John Ashcroft, introduced Harry to rock 'n' roll records, and the members of Rory Storm & The Hurricanes and Cass & The Cassanovas. Harry carried notebooks with him, collecting information about the local groups, once writing to The Daily Mail: "Liverpool is like New Orleans at the turn of the century, but with rock 'n' roll instead of jazz". He also wrote to The Liverpool Echo about the emerging Liverpool music scene, but neither paper was interested in stories about music that was popular with teenagers. The classified ads in The Liverpool Echo for local groups were always under the heading of Jazz, but the paper refused to change this policy, despite pleas from the promoters and groups who actually paid for them. Harry planned to produce a jazz newspaper called Storyville/52nd Street and contacted Sam Leach, the owner of a club called Storyville. Leach promised to fund the newspaper, but failed to turn up for three meetings with Harry, leaving him no other option but to find another investor. Harry thought starting a fortnightly newspaper covering Liverpool's rock 'n' roll music scene would be more successful, and would differ from national music newspapers such as the New Musical Express and the Melody Maker, which only wrote articles about current chart hits and artists.

== Mersey Beat ==
Photographer Dick Matthews, a friend from the Jacaranda, heard about Harry's problems with Leach and introduced Harry to a local civil servant, Jim Anderson, who lent Harry £50. This enabled Harry to found Mersey Beat in 1961. Harry decided to publish the newspaper every two weeks, covering the music scene in Liverpool, Wirral, Birkenhead, New Brighton, Crosby and Southport, as well as Warrington, Widnes and Runcorn. He thought up the name Mersey Beat by thinking about a policeman's 'beat' (the area of duty), which had nothing to do with a musical beat. Harry's fiancée Virginia Sowry gave up her accountancy/comptometer operator job at Woolworth's and worked full-time for two guineas (£2.10/-) a week (also contributing a Mersey Roundabout article), while Harry lived on his Senior City Art Scholarship funding. Matthews photographed groups, while Anderson found a small attic office for £5 a week above David Land's wine merchant's shop at 81a Renshaw Street, Liverpool. Anderson and Matthews helped with the move to the new office, with Anderson providing a desk, chair and an Olivetti typewriter.

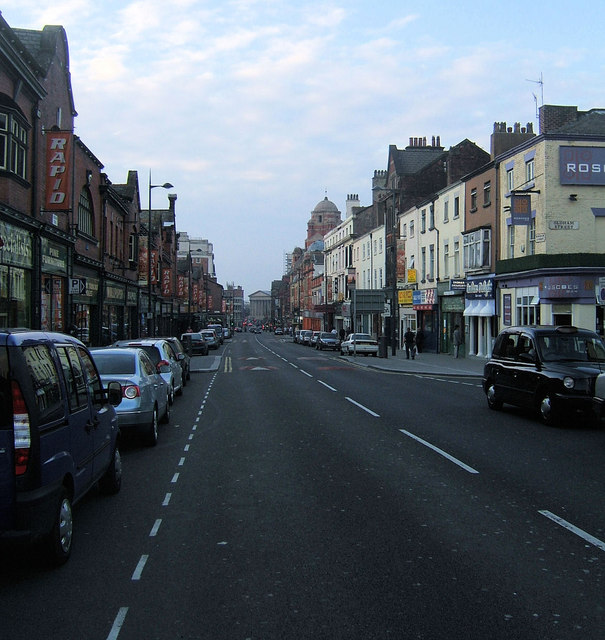
The original Mersey Beat office was at 81a Renshaw Street, Liverpool. (green shop front on the right)

Harry asked printer James E. James (who had printed Frank Comments), if he could borrow the printing blocks he used for photos, as they were too expensive for the fledgling company at the time. Harry also borrowed blocks from the Widnes Weekly News, Pantosphinx and local cinemas, but contributed to charities by printing free charity advertisements at the side of the front cover page. After taking Virginia home to Bowring Park in the evening, Harry would often return to the office and work throughout the night, pausing only to go to the Pier Head to buy a cup of tea and a hot pie at four in the morning. Virginia's parents helped the paper during this time, as they paid for classified ads, and arranged for Harry and his future wife's first photographs together.

== The first issue ==
Splitting the price of the newspaper (three pence), with retailers, Harry arranged for three major wholesalers, W.H. Smith, Blackburn's, and Conlan's, to sell Mersey Beat. Harry personally delivered copies to more than 20 newsagents as well as to local venues and musical instrument and record stores, such as Cramer & Lea, Rushworth & Draper, and Cranes. The paper released its first edition on 6 July 1961, selling out all 5,000 copies. The paper's circulation increased rapidly as Harry started featuring stories about groups in Manchester, Birmingham, Sheffield and Newcastle, with circulation growing to 75,000. As the newspaper's sales rose, it became known as the "Teenagers Bible". Local groups were soon being called "beat groups", and venues started advertising concerts as "Beat Sessions". With circulation rising, the paper's offices were moved downstairs to a larger two-roomed office. The Cavern Club's doorman, Pat (Paddy) Delaney, was employed to deliver copies, a secretary, Pat Finn, was hired, as well as Raymond Kane to promote advertising space,

Harry later said: "The newspapers, television, theatres and radio were all run by people of a different generation who had no idea of what youngsters wanted. For decades they had manipulated and controlled them. Suddenly, there was an awareness of being young, and young people wanted their own styles and their own music, just at the time they were beginning to earn money, which gave them the spending power. Mersey Beat was their voice, it was a paper for them, crammed with photos and information about their own groups, which is why it also began to appeal to youngsters throughout Britain as its coverage extended to other areas." Because of the employment situation in Liverpool at the time, The Daily Worker newspaper denounced the enthusiasm of younger people in Liverpool by saying "The Mersey Sound is the sound of 30,000 people on the dole."

== Liverpool groups ==
Between 1958 and 1964, the Merseyside area had about 500 different groups, which were constantly forming and breaking up, with an average of about 350 groups playing concerts on a regular basis. In 1961, Harry and The Cavern Club's DJ, Bob Wooler, compiled a list of groups that they had personally heard of, which had almost 300 names. In 1962, Mersey Beat held a poll to find out who was the most popular Merseyside group. When the votes were counted, Rory Storm & The Hurricanes were in first place, but after looking through the postal votes again, Harry noticed that forty votes were all written in green ink, in the same handwriting, and from the same area of Liverpool, so the dubious votes were declared void. This was suspected to have been Storm himself, but Harry had no idea that The Beatles had done exactly the same thing.

The results were announced on 4 January 1962, with The Beatles in first place. The results were printed in issue 13 of Mersey Beat on 4 January 1962, with the front page announcing, "Beatles Top Poll!"

An iconic symbol of the Mersey Beat era was the poster artwork created by local artist Tony Booth. He was a popular figure amongst the promoters in the area where he was commissioned to create hundreds of the posters used to advertise all the concerts that were occurring during that period. His posters were seen on walls all across Merseyside including some of his famous work outside The Cavern Club.

== The poll ==
In 1962, Mersey Beat held a poll to find out who was the most popular Merseyside group. The results were announced on 4 January 1962:

1. The Beatles
2. Gerry and the Pacemakers
3. The Remo Four
4. Rory Storm and the Hurricanes
5. Johnny Sandon and The Searchers
6. Kingsize Taylor and the Dominoes
7. The Big Three
8. The Strangers
9. Faron & The Flamingos
10. The Four Jays
11. Ian and the Zodiacs
12. The Undertakers
13. Earl Preston & The TTs
14. Mark Peters and the Cyclones
15. Karl Terry and the Cruisers
16. Derry and the Seniors
17. Steve and the Syndicate
18. Dee Fenton and the Silhouettes
19. Billy Kramer and the Coasters
20. Dale Roberts and the Jaywalkers

Such was the popularity of the poll, Rushworth's music store manager, Bob Hobbs, presented Lennon and George Harrison with new guitars. Many groups in Liverpool complained to Harry that his newspaper should be called Mersey Beatles, as he featured them so often.

The Stern magazine in Germany phoned Harry and asked if he could arrange a photograph of all the groups in Liverpool. Harry suggested Kirchherr (then Sutcliffe's girlfriend) be the photographer, who would stand on a crane to take the photograph. Virginia phoned every group in Liverpool and arranged for them all to turn up on the same day at St George's Hall. Kirchherr and Max Scheler said that every group would be paid £1 per musician (equivalent to £19 in 2025), but over 200 groups turned up on the day, and Kirchherr and Scheler ran out of money as a result.

Another of the paper's noted supporters was Brian Epstein, the future Beatles' manager, who wrote a regular column about new record releases available at NEMS Enterprises.

Harry asked a local singer, Priscilla White, to contribute a fashion column after writing an article called "Swinging Cilla", in which he wrote, "Cilla Black is a Liverpool girl who is starting out on the road to fame." Harry’s mistake came about because he could not remember her surname (which he knew was a colour), but White decided to keep it as a stage name. Two years later Harry arranged for Black to sing for Epstein at the Blue Angel club, leading to a management contract.

In late 1962, Harry wrote an article called "Take a look up North", asking for A&R men from London to travel up to Liverpool and see what was really happening with the music scene, but not one record company sent an A&R representative to Liverpool. Journalist Nancy Spain once wrote an article for the News of the World newspaper, stating that "Bill and Virginia Harry were Mr. & Mrs. Mersey Beat", and when Bob Dylan visited Liverpool to appear at the Odeon, he specifically asked for Harry to act as his guide to the city.

== The last issues and London ==
On 13 September 1964, Epstein approached Harry to create a national music paper, so Harry coined the name Music Echo, and gradually merged Mersey Beat into it. Epstein had promised Harry full editorial control, but then hired a female press officer in London to write a fashion column and a D.J. to write a gossip column, without informing Harry of his intentions, and Harry resigned as a result.

== Bibliography ==
- Astley, John (2006). Why Don't We Do It in the Road?: The "Beatles" Phenomenon. England: Information Architects. ISBN 978-0-9551834-7-8.
- Coleman, Ray (1989). Brian Epstein: The Man Who Made The Beatles. Mcgraw-Hill. ISBN 978-0-07-011789-1.
- Harry, Bill (1984). The Book of Lennon. Australia: John Wiley & Sons Australia Ltd. ISBN 978-0-906053-74-4.
- Spitz, Bob (2005). The Beatles – The Biography. Little, Brown and Company. ISBN 978-0-316-80352-6.
