= Kingsize Taylor and the Dominoes =

British rock and roll band

- Origin: Liverpool, England
- Genres: Rock and roll
- Years active: 1958–1964
- Labels: Decca; Ariola; Polydor
- Past members: Ted "Kingsize" Taylor; Arthur Baker; George Watson; Charlie Flynn; Sam Hardie; Cliff Roberts; Bobby Thompson; John Kennedy; John Frankland; Dave Lovelady; Ken Shalliker; Brian Redman; Gibson Kemp; Howie Casey; Dave Woods; Mal Price
- Website: www.kingsizetaylor.com

Kingsize Taylor and the Dominoes were a British rock and roll band, formed in Liverpool in the late 1950s by Ted "Kingsize" Taylor (born Edward William Taylor; 12 November 1939 – 2 January 2023). One of the first beat groups in the Merseyside area, they were a locally popular and influential group who were contemporaries and rivals of The Beatles, and featured Cilla Black as a guest singer before her solo career, but had little commercial success except in West Germany.

== Career ==
The Dominoes were originally formed in north Liverpool, in 1957, from a school skiffle group called the Sinners. The original members were Arthur Baker (vocals), George Watson (guitar), Charlie Flynn (guitar), Sam Hardie (piano) and Cliff Roberts (drums). The following year, Ted Taylor, called "Kingsize" for his 6ft 5in (1.96m) height, joined as lead vocalist and guitarist. Over the next two years, Baker, Watson and Flynn all left, and the group was completed by Bobby Thompson (bass and vocals) – with whom Taylor had played in another skiffle group, the James Boys – and John Kennedy (rhythm guitar), with Geoff Bethell often standing in for Hardie on piano. The band played local clubs, and Taylor developed a reputation as one of the best rock and roll singers in the Liverpool area as well as being noted for his vivid chequered jackets.

By summer 1960, the group were being billed as Kingsize Taylor and the Dominoes. They first performed at The Cavern Club in January 1961, when they featured 17-year-old singer Cilla White, who was mistakenly renamed Cilla Black later that year by Bill Harry in an article in his magazine Mersey Beat. Soon after that appearance, Kennedy and Roberts left the band to join another group, Ian and the Zodiacs, and were replaced by John Frankland (rhythm guitar) and Dave Lovelady (drums). At the beginning of 1962, the band were placed sixth in a Mersey Beat readers' poll, topped by The Beatles. Cilla Black sang regularly with the group until 1962.

In early 1962, Ken Shalliker replaced Thompson on bass for several months when Thompson temporarily joined Rory Storm and the Hurricanes. In the summer, the band (without Cilla Black) went to Hamburg, where they began making regular appearances at the Star-Club. Lovelady left later in the year, and was replaced briefly by Brian Redman and then by Gibson Kemp, after Ringo Starr turned down the opportunity to join having been offered more money to join The Beatles. In December 1962, Taylor recorded several performances by The Beatles at the Star-Club, on reel-to-reel tape; the recordings were eventually released in 1977 as Live! at the Star-Club in Hamburg, Germany; 1962, after legal proceedings over their ownership were resolved.

Kingsize Taylor and the Dominoes were signed by Decca Records in West Germany, and also recorded there for the Philips Records and Ariola labels. They added saxophonist Howie Casey in 1963; later that year, Hardie left to join Tony Sheridan's band, and was replaced by a second sax player, Dave Woods. In 1963, they recorded an album, Live At The Star Club for Ariola, with whom they had a recording contract, but were also persuaded to make a separate album for Polydor Records. The album, Let's Do the Slop, Twist, Madison, Hully Gully..., was released under the pseudonym of The Shakers. Three singles from the album – "Money", "Whole Lotta Lovin'", and "Hippy Hippy Shake" – were released by Polydor in the UK. All the recordings by Kingsize Taylor and the Dominoes were covers of rock and roll and rhythm and blues songs by other artists; they wrote no songs themselves. Their biggest success in West Germany was a version of Solomon Burke's "Stupidity", also released on the Decca label in the UK. While in West Germany, they also performed regularly in Kiel and West Berlin, and acted as backing group for Alex Harvey, before returning to the UK to back Chuck Berry and Carl Perkins on tour in 1964. They also appeared on the British TV show Ready Steady Go!.

== Later activities ==
The original Kingsize Taylor and the Dominoes split up at the end of 1964, with the Dominoes – Frankland, Casey, Thompson and Kemp, with singer Paddy Chambers – remaining in the UK to work. Taylor returned with his German wife to Hamburg, where he played lead guitar for the Griff Parry Five before forming a new version of Kingsize Taylor and the Dominoes with Baz Davies, Mamoud Hari, Kenny Rees and Cliff Roberts. After recording a solo single for Decca in London in 1964, "Somebody's Always Tryin'", with Jimmy Page on guitar, he gave up the music business and returned to Crosby on Merseyside. There, and later at Birkdale, he ran a family butcher's business for over thirty years until his retirement.

Thompson joined Cliff Bennett and the Rebel Rousers, and then The Rockin' Berries in 1965. Frankland and Kemp formed a new group, The Eyes, with future actor Lewis Collins, before Kemp formed the trio Paddy, Klaus & Gibson, with Paddy Chambers and Klaus Voormann; he later worked in A&R. Taylor reunited with Hardie, Davies, Frankland and others for occasional performances from the 1990s onwards.

In 1999, Bear Family Records issued the complete Ariola recordings by Kingsize Taylor and the Dominoes. Taylor returned to live in Germany in 2006 and continued to perform with a band called The Brotherhood of Rock 'n' Soul. Kingsize Taylor died on 2 January 2023, at the age of 83.
