= Howie Casey =

English R&B and rock saxophonist (born 1937)

- Born: Howard William Casey; 12 July 1937 (age 88); Huyton, Liverpool, England
- Genres: Rhythm and blues
- Occupation: Musician
- Instrument: Saxophone
- Years active: 1958–present
- Formerly of: Derry and the Seniors; Howie Casey and the Seniors; Paul McCartney and Wings; T. Rex; The Who; ABC
- Website: http://beatleswithwings.wix.com/beatles-with-wings

Howard William Casey (born 12 July 1937) is a British rhythm and blues and rock saxophonist. He came to prominence in the early 1960s as a member of Derry and the Seniors, the first rock and roll band from Liverpool to play clubs in Germany, and later as leader of the renamed Howie Casey and the Seniors, the first Liverpool group to record an LP. He was a sought after session musician, particularly in horn sections in the 1970s, recording and/or touring with groups including Paul McCartney and Wings, T. Rex, the Who, ABC and the Roy Young Band.

== Early life ==
He was born in Huyton, Liverpool to Thomas and Stella (Sarah) Casey, and started playing saxophone in his teens. After a period working in engineering, he was called up for national service in 1955, played in a military band, and, after hearing early rock and roll records by Little Richard, Fats Domino and others, formed a rock group before leaving the Army in 1958. Back in Liverpool, he first joined the Rhythm Rockers, a group led by drummer Frank Wibberley, and then another group, the Hy-Tones.

== The Seniors ==
He formed his own band, the Seniors, at the end of 1959. Other original members of the group were Billy Hughes (rhythm guitar), Stan Foster (piano) – both of whom had been in the Hy-Tones – together with Brian Griffiths (lead guitar), Phil Whitehead (bass) and Jeff Wallington (drums). They soon added lead singer Derry Wilkie, a black British singer who had previously sung with the Hy-Tones. As Derry and the Seniors, the group performed in local venues, and in May 1960, after appearing in a show headed by Gene Vincent, were invited to audition for the role of backing band for Liverpool star Billy Fury. Although they did not win the audition, they were invited by Fury's manager Larry Parnes to go to London to perform at the 2i's Coffee Bar in Soho.

A few weeks later, they played at the 2i's, and happened to be seen there by Bruno Koschmider, a visiting German club owner who was looking for acts that he could use in his Hamburg club, the Kaiserkeller. The Seniors travelled to Germany and played regularly in Hamburg over the summer of 1960, later being joined there by rival Liverpool group, the Beatles. However, as the group members did not have work permits or visas, they were repatriated to the UK in October 1960. At the start of 1961, the group reformed using the name Howie Casey and the Seniors, with Frank Wibberley on drums, and Wilkie sharing vocals with Freddie Fowell, who later changed his name to Freddie Starr. They then signed a recording deal with Fontana Records, becoming the first beat group from Liverpool to record an LP. The album, Twist at the Top, was issued in February 1962, together with a single, "Double Twist". Two further singles followed, "I Ain't Mad at You" and "The Boll Weevil Song", but they were not hits. The group broke up in mid-1962. An expanded CD version of the album Twist at the Top was released by Bear Family Records in 2010.

== In Europe ==
In 1963, Casey travelled to Germany and joined Kingsize Taylor and the Dominoes, who were based in Hamburg. The group recorded there for the Philips label, and also for Polydor. The Polydor album, Let's Do the Slop, Twist, Madison, Hully Gully..., was released under the pseudonym of "The Shakers", and three singles from it – "Money", "Whole Lotta Lovin'", and "Hippy Hippy Shake" – were released in the UK. Kingsize Taylor and the Dominoes, with Casey, also acted as backing group for Alex Harvey, before returning to the UK to back Chuck Berry and Carl Perkins on tour in 1964. Soon afterwards, the group split up, with Taylor returning to Germany and the other band members staying in the UK.

However, Casey soon returned to Germany with another band, the Pawns, and then joined The Krew, who performed in France, Italy and Switzerland. Casey also played with his own band in Europe, before returning to live in London in 1970.

== Session musician and Wings ==
He soon became successful as a session musician, working particularly in association with record producer Tony Visconti, on records for Marc Bolan and many others, and touring with Bolan. Visconti then asked him to work with Paul McCartney – who Casey had not met for several years, since the Beatles' success – on the Wings album Band on the Run, recorded in 1973. He appeared on several tracks, including "Jet", "Bluebird" and "Mrs. Vandebilt". He also played with Wings on the 66-show Wings Over the World tour in 1975–1976, subsequently appearing on the live album, and TV/film releases from that tour: Wings Over America, Wings Over the World, and Rockshow. He also played on the studio albums Wings at the Speed of Sound (1976) and Back to the Egg (1979), and as part of the "Rockestra" at the Concerts for the People of Kampuchea (1979). He was scheduled to take part in McCartney's next world tour, but it was abandoned after McCartney was arrested for possession of marijuana in Japan at the start of 1980.

Casey appeared on Paice Ashton Lord's 1976 album, Malice in Wonderland. He played on the film soundtrack of Tommy (1975), and toured with The Who in 1979.

== Later life ==
Casey's third wife Sheila sang with her sister Jeanette as the McKinleys, who made several records and toured in the early 1960s, and provided backing vocals for the Beatles, the Rolling Stones, the Hollies and others. The couple moved to Bournemouth to live in 1979.

In the early 1980s Howie and Sheila Casey formed the Slobs, a rhythm and blues, soul, and rock and roll band comprising locally based session musicians. With a varying line-up, the Slobs continue to perform in southern England and to tour more widely.

In 2007 Casey appeared in Marc Bolan: The Celebration Concert, along with Tony Visconti, Gloria Jones, Marc Almond and others, on the occasion of Bolan's 60th birthday anniversary. The concert was issued on DVD in 2012.

Sheila Casey died from cancer in December 2012.

In 2014, Howie performed in New Zealand with a Wings and Beatles tribute show, featuring local singer and songwriter Tim Armstrong, and also recorded several songs with Armstrong.

On returning to the UK Casey put together Beatles With Wings, a band of 10 to 13 musicians with a full horn section celebrating the music of Paul McCartney, the Beatles, and Wings.

== Selective discography ==
=== Singles ===
Year	Title	Artist	Chart	Casey's role
1962	Twist at the Top	Howie Casey and the Seniors	-	Band leader, co-writer, saxophone
1966	Everything's Alright	The Krew	-	Saxophone
1968	Cry Like a Baby	Barry St. John	-	Arranger, saxophone
1973	20th Century Boy	T. Rex	UK#3	Saxophone
1974	The Golden Age of Rock 'n' Roll	Mott the Hoople	UK#16	Saxophone
1974	Mrs. Vandebilt	Paul McCartney and Wings	NLD#7	Saxophone solo
1974	Jet	Paul McCartney and Wings	US#7, UK#7	Saxophone feature
1976	Silly Love Songs	Wings	US#1, UK#2	Saxophone
1976	Let 'Em In	Wings	US#3, UK#2	Saxophone
1979	Arrow Through Me	Wings	US#29	Saxophone
1983	S.O.S.	ABC	UK#39	Saxophone solo
1987	When Smokey Sings	ABC	US#5, UK#11	Saxophone

=== Albums ===
Year	Title	Artist	Chart	Casey's role
1962	Twist at the Top	Howie Casey and the Seniors	-	Band leader, co-writer, saxophone
1963	Let's Do The Madison, Twist, Locomotion, Slop, Hully Gully, Monkey	The Shakers (aka Kingsize Taylor and the Dominoes)	-	Saxophone
1963	Live at the Star Club	Kingsize Taylor and the Dominoes	-	Saxophone
1964	Alex Harvey and His Soul Band	Alex Harvey	-	Saxophone
1968	According to St. John	Barry St. John	-	Arranger, saxophone
1971	The Roy Young Band	Roy Young Band	-	Co-writer, arranger, saxophones
1973	Tales of Old Grand Daddy	Marcus Hook Roll Band	-	Saxophone
1973	Rigor Mortis Sets In	John Entwistle	-	Saxophone
1973	Tanx	T. Rex	UK#4	Saxophone
1973	Band on the Run	Paul McCartney and Wings	US#7, UK#9	Saxophone solos on "Jet", "Bluebird", "Mrs. Vandebilt"
1974	The Hoople	Mott the Hoople	UK#11	Saxophone
1975	Mad Dog	John Entwistle's Ox	-	Saxophone
1975	Tommy: Original Soundtrack	The Who	US#2, UK#21	Saxophone
1976	Wings at the Speed of Sound	Wings	US#1, UK#2	Saxophone
1976	Wings Over America	Wings	US#1, UK#8	Saxophone, sax solo on "Lady Madonna"
1979	Back to the Egg	Wings	US#8, UK#6	Saxophone
1980	Japanese Tears	Denny Laine	-	Saxophone
1981	Concerts for the People of Kampuchea	Various artists	US#36	Saxophone with the Who, Wings, Rockestra
1981	Bucks Fizz	Bucks Fizz	UK#14	Saxophone
1983	Beauty Stab	ABC	UK#12	Saxophones
1987	Alphabet City	ABC	UK#7	Saxophone
