= Shake It Up =

Shake It Up may refer to:

- Shake It Up (Boney James & Rick Braun album), 2000
- Shake It Up (The Cars album), 1981
  - "Shake It Up" (The Cars song), the title song
- "Shake It Up" (Divine song), 1983
- "Shake It Up" (Koda Kumi song), 2005
- "Shake It Up" (Bad Company song), 1988
- "Shake It Up", a song by New Order from Lost Sirens, 2013
- "Shake It Up", a song by Elizabeth Daily from the 1983 film Scarface, included in its soundtrack
- "Shake It Up", a song by Pitbull featuring Oobie from M.I.A.M.I., 2004
- "Shake It Up", 2018 song by Trippie Redd, from Life's a Trip
- Shake It Up (American TV series), a U.S. Disney Channel original series that aired from 2010 to 2013, or the title theme performed by Selena Gomez
  - Shake It Up: I Love Dance soundtrack, 2013
- Shake It Up (Indian TV series), a 2013 Indian adaptation of the American series
- Shake It Up (Chinese TV series), a Chinese dance competition

== See also ==
- Shake It Out, a song by Florence and the Machine
- Shake It Off (disambiguation)
