= Mandelbaum =

Mandelbaum is a Jewish (Ashkenazic) surname from the German Mandelbaum ‘almond tree’. Notable people with the surname include:

- Albert Mandelbaum (1925–unknown), Israeli chess player
- Allen Mandelbaum (1926–2011), American professor of Italian literature, poet, and translator
- David Mandelbaum (born 1935), American Democratic party politician
- David G. Mandelbaum (1911–1987), American anthropologist
- Fredericka Mandelbaum (1825–1894), New York entrepreneur and criminal fence operator
- Frederic Morton (born Fritz Mandelbaum) (1924–2015), Austrian writer
- Henryk Mandelbaum (1922–2008), Holocaust survivor
- Jacques Mandelbaum (born 1958), French journalist and film critic
- Joel Mandelbaum (born 1932), microtonal musician
- Ken Mandelbaum, American columnist, critic, and author
- Kurt Mandelbaum (1904–1995), development economist
- Maurice Mandelbaum (1908–1987), American philosopher and phenomenologist
- Michael Mandelbaum (born 1946), professor of American foreign policy
- Samuel Mandelbaum (1884–1946), American lawyer and politician

== Fictional characters ==
- Izzy Mandelbaum, character on Seinfeld
- Mandelbaum (aka Mandel), assistant district attorney for Manhattan in the Nero Wolfe books

== See also ==
- Mandelbaum Gate, Jerusalem
- The Mandelbaum Gate, a 1965 novel by Muriel Spark
- Mandelbaum Effect, the tendency for people to focus nearby in conditions of poor visibility
