= Ian and the Zodiacs =

English Merseybeat/R&B band

- Also known as: The Koppykats
- Origin: Liverpool, England
- Genres: Merseybeat; British rhythm and blues; Pop rock; Rock and roll
- Years active: 1958–1967, 2000–2003, 2005
- Labels: Oriole; Star-Club Records
- Past members: Ian Edwards; Charles Flynn; Peter Wallace; Geoff Bethell; Cliff Roberts; Geoff Bamford; Joe Walsh; Tony Coates; Freddie Smith; Arthur Ashton; Colin Fabb; Carl Hardin; Les Maguire; Baz Davies; Barry Walmsley; Neil Lancaster

Ian and the Zodiacs were an English Merseybeat/R&B band formed in 1958, originally known as The Zodiacs, in Liverpool, England. Led by Ian Edwards (13 October 1943 – 22 October 2007), the band existed in relative obscurity until relocating to Germany in 1964 where they achieved national success. During the band's three-year stint in Germany, they released three albums under their name, exclusive to the country until their re-release. They also released two cover albums featuring material by The Beatles with the name, The Koppykats.

== History ==
The band formed as a jazz group in 1958, and performed under the name, The Zodiacs. The group came together following an audition at a local venue called Savoy Hall. In the spring of 1960, Ian Edwards departed from his band, The Deltones, and joined The Zodiacs. From that point on, the band became known as Ian and the Zodiacs, and shifted their style from jazz to rock and roll. Following several personnel changes, the lineup for the group included Edwards as lead vocalist, Pete Wallace on lead guitar, Geoff Bethell on piano, Charlie Flynn (stage name: Wellington Wade) on bass guitar, and Cliff Roberts on drums. The band played top venues in the area, and became the resident group for St. Lukes Hall (The Jive-Hive). During their touring, they found their manager, Ralph Webster. On 4 January 1962, Mersey Beat released a poll citing the band was the eleventh most popular Merseyside group. The band released their first single on the Oriole label in 1963 to limited success. Edwards recalled, regarding their inability to achieve success in England, "We spent too much time at the Grapes". The Grapes being the Mathew Street pub where bands would take breaks from performing. In May 1964, the band got rid of Bethell and auditioned Geoff Bamford to replace Roberts on drums.

Later in 1964, the band travelled to Hamburg, Germany for what was supposed to be a month of touring. The band would remain in the country for the next three years after gaining widespread popularity amidst their touring and television appearances. During the summer of 1965 they were a resident group at Butlins Skegness, a UK Lincolnshire holiday camp. Edwards' distinctive vocals helped develop the group's reputation, and set them apart from other acts. Their act was centered around US, and UK hits along with some of their own original material. They became promoted by Manfred Weissleder, owner of the Star-Club, who featured them in his various clubs, and were joined by drummer Joe Walsh. Following a car accident in May 1965, Wallace and Walsh departed, and were replaced by Freddie Smith and Arthur Ashton. The band released three albums, all of which charted in Germany, during their stay in the country. The albums, Star Club 7, Just Listen to Ian and the Zodiacs, and Locomotive!, were all released on the Star Club label. The material from the albums ranged from rock and roll, pop rock, and later soul influences.

Outside the band name, they released two cover albums consisting of The Beatles' compositions under the name, The KoppyKats. Their biggest selling hit in the UK, 1965's double album The Beatles Beat, was recorded on a limited budget, but was still relatively successful. Another Beatles cover album, Gears Again, followed with less success. In support of the albums, they released "Nowhere Man" and "Help!" as singles. The albums sold well thanks to the lower prices in comparison to The Beatles' releases. The band released several singles, all on different labels, to the UK and the United States, and, despite failing to chart in the UK, still managed to achieve a regional hit in the US. Their single, "The Crying Game", became a number one hit in Texas, selling 250,000 copies. The band would have toured the US, but could not as they did not have green cards.

The band continued to tour throughout Germany until July 1967. Edwards' wife had fallen ill so he disbanded the group to return to England. He reformed the band the following year with German musicians, to lesser success. Two other incarnations of the band formed, one in 2000, touring Germany until 2003, and another in 2004. From 2004 until his death in 2007 he made a comeback in Germany, performing at festivals in Hamburg, Weimar, Berlin and Cologne, as well as in Liverpool's Cavern Club. He was backed by the German musicians Manfred Jung (bass), Jürgen Pfingst (lead guitar), Dr. Joachim Wagner (rhythm guitar) and Raimund Jung (drums). The backing group from Cologne, Germany, still performs as Ian's Zodiacs and as The Roaring Forties, and is also well known in Liverpool.

In the 1990s, the band's albums were re-released by the Repertoire label. Five of the group's tracks, "Beechwood", "It Ain't Necessarily So", "Secret Love", "Let's Turkey Trot", and "You Can Think Again", have also appeared on the 1989 compilation album, This Is MerseyBeat. A greatest hits album called Wade in the Water was distributed by RPM which was composed of re-mastered songs by the band.
