= People's Methodist Episcopal Church =

- U.S. National Register of Historic Places
- Colorado State Register of Historic Properties
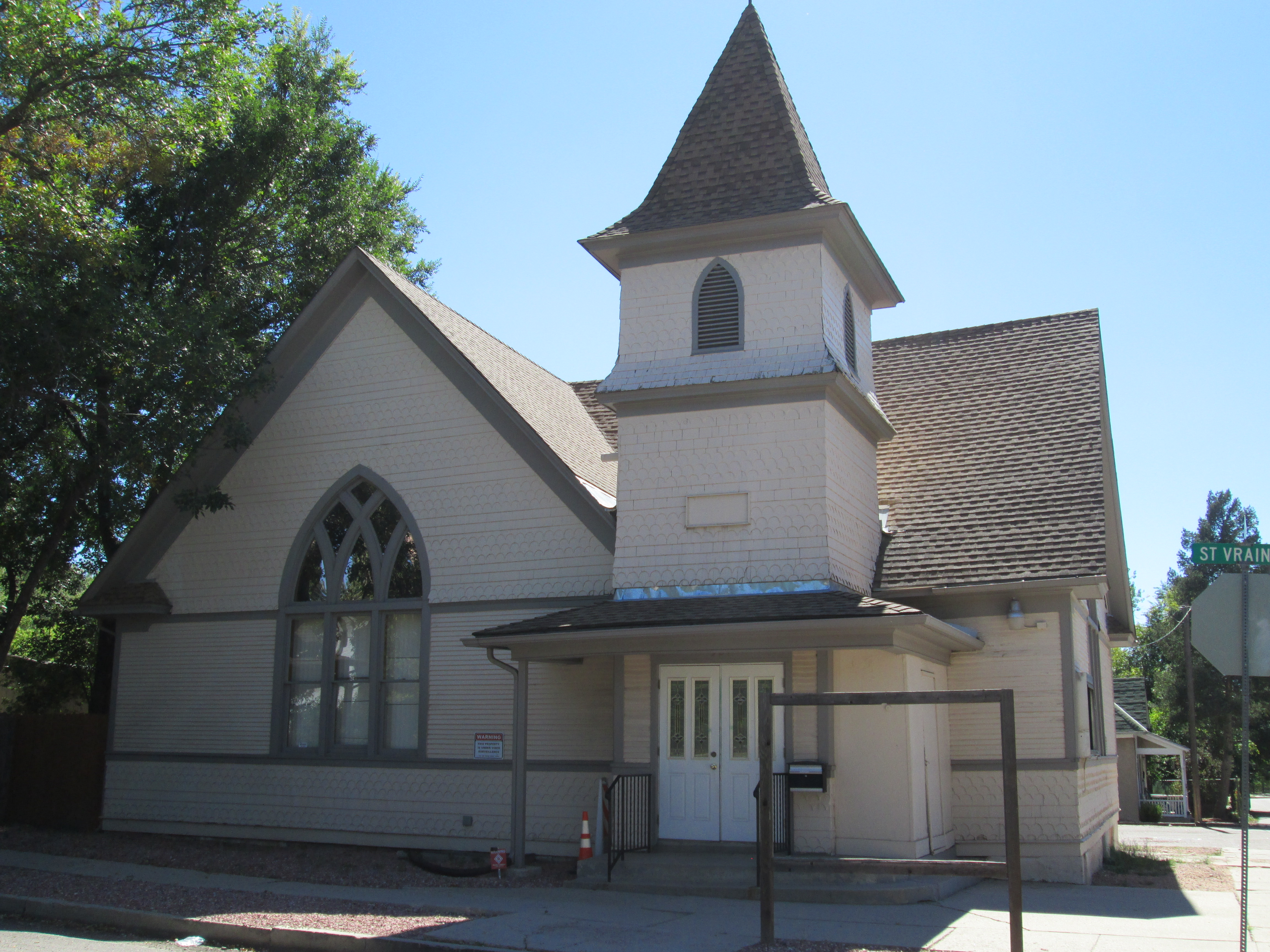

- Location within Colorado
- Location: 527 East St. Vrain Street, Colorado Springs, Colorado
- Coordinates: 38°50′25″N 104°48′54″W
- Built: 1904
- Architectural style: Queen Anne
- NRHP reference No.: 14000432
- CSRHP No.: 5EP.7321
- Added to NRHP: July 25, 2014

People's Methodist Episcopal Church, also known at the Independent Missionary Baptist Church, is a historic church in Colorado Springs in El Paso County, Colorado. Reverend Charles W. Homes was sent from Oskoloosa, Iowa by the Central Jurisdiction of the Methodist Church to build churches in black communities. They church was formed on February 18, 1903, by a group of ex-slaves or children of ex-slaves and began meeting at the Grand United Order of Odd Fellows' Hall. The church was built in 1904 in a neighborhood that was predominantly African-American. Prominent early members include Jesse Bass, Lonnie Bassett, and Frank Loper.

By 1900, there were 875 African-Americans living in the city (which had a total population of 21,085 people). People's Methodist Episcopal Church was the third African-American church formed in Colorado Springs, but the first built north of Pikes Peak Avenue where more than 75 black families lived. The first was Payne Chapel African Methodist Episcopal (AME) Church built in 1875 at Weber Street at Pueblo Avenue. It was established by the pioneering Carter brothers from Iowa on the land was donated by William Jackson Palmer. St. John's Baptist Church was built three years later on Pueblo Avenue and East Cimarron Street.

It was centered in one of the largest African-American communities in the state and served as the Universal Negro Improvement Association headquarters for Colorado Springs from 1921 to the mid-1930s. The Universal Negro Improvement Association, established by Marcus Garvey in 1914, became one of the largest black empowerment movements in the world. Marcus Garvey visited Colorado Springs in May 1922 and again in October 1924 with his wife, Amy Jacques Garvey. The church provided meeting space for the DuBois Study Club, People's Literary Society, National Association for the Advancement of Colored People, Women's Home Missionary Society, Ladies Aid Society, and Colorado Springs Unity Council.

The church building is historically significant for the role that it served in the African-American community and its distinctive Queen Anne architecture with elements of Gothic Revival architecture. It is one of the oldest wood-framed and clad churches on its original foundation in the Colorado Springs area. In the early 1930s the church was altered to have a broader, steeper pitched roof, removal of several small double-hung windows, arched windows were replaced with wood tracery, and two side-by-side, arched steeple openings were replaced with a smaller, single, centered arched opening.

The church moved to 826 Boulder Street in 1965. The St. Vrain building has always been a place of worship.
