= Moshe Shaked =

American mathematician and statistician

Moshe Shaked (February 21, 1945 - October 28, 2014) was an American mathematician and statistician. He was a student at the Hebrew University of Jerusalem and at the University of Rochester, where he completed his Ph.D. in 1975, under Albert W. Marshall. Shaked held various positions at the University of New Mexico, the University of British Columbia, and at Indiana University. He became a full professor of mathematics at the University of Arizona in 1986, and he was a Professor Emeritus at Arizona since 2013. Moshe Shaked was a Fellow of the Institute of Mathematical Statistics.

Shaked was a leading figure in stochastic order and distribution theory. He published widely in applied probability and statistics. He became most celebrated internationally for his collection of influential papers on stochastic order and multivariate dependence. Shaked’s contribution also includes pioneering studies on stochastic convexity and on multivariate phase-type distributions, with important applications in reliability modelling and queueing analysis. He made significant contributions to multivariate aging notions and multivariate life distributions, as well as to accelerated life tests (inference, non-parametric approach and goodness of fit).

Moshe Shaked was born in Jerusalem to a Polish immigrant family. He was a knowledgeable ancient-coin enthusiast and a passionate museum-goer. His son, Tal Shaked, is an American chess grandmaster.
