= Thamer Shaker =

Saudi businessman (born 1975)

- Born: July 1975 (age 50)
- Occupations: writer, businessman, and management consultant

Thamer Adnan Shaker (Arabic: ثامر عدنان شاكر) is a Saudi businessman, management consultant, and writer. He is the founder of Shaker Consultancy House.

== Career ==
Thamer was born in Jeddah, July 1975. He received his master's degree in business administration from Nova Southeastern University, Florida, USA. He received his bachelor's degree in accounting. He has more than 15 years of experience in media. In that period, He wrote 10 books, participated in many events, spoke in many local and regional conferences, Contributed to the production of the cultural salon in Mecca, and other cultural programs. He has more than 20 years of experience in management, enterprise and strategy development, and leadership development in both government and public sectors. He founded MYSAN Management Consulting company in 2014. Through MYSAN, he led several to implement development programs. He is now a CEO of an IT company, a member of the American Academy of Financial Management, a member of the American Institute of Management Consultant, and a board member of some Saudi institutes.

== Works ==
- Afwan Saqat Amdan (Pardon, It Fall on Purpose) (2006).
- Hadath Al’am AlQadem (Happened Next Year) (2009).
- Qazam Wa Imlaq Wa Watan (A dwarf, a Giant, And a Homeland) (2010).
- Huna Twitter (Here Is Twitter) (2011).
- Ashiq Min Al’alam Althalith (A Lover from the Third World) (2012).
- Sarrah Masdar Gayr Mas’ool (Irresponsible Source Said) (2013).
- Al-Ustathe (The Teacher) (2015).
- Sahip AlSumow Al-Hub (His Highness Love) (2017)
- Abir Hayah (A Life Passerby) (2018)
- Al-Qada Al-Judud: 100 Nasiha Fi Al-Qiyada AlHadeetha Jur’tuk Al-Yawmiya Fi Dakika (The New Leaders: 100 advice on Modern Leadership, Your Daily Dose in a Minute) (2018).
