= Milk Shakes (Washington) =

Mountain in Washington (state), United States

Coordinates: 46.00542°N 117.90326°W

Milk Shakes is a mountain in Columbia County, Washington, in the United States. With an elevation of 5,797 feet (1,767 m), Milk Shakes is the 911th highest summit in the state of Washington.

Milk Shakes, and its earlier name of Twin Tits, was so named because settlers saw it as a breast-shaped hill.
