= Shira Shaked =

Israeli concert pianist and musician (born 1981)

Shira Shaked שירה שקד
- Born: 1981 (age 44–45); Tel Aviv, Israel
- Origin: Israeli
- Genres: Classical; Chamber music
- Occupations: Musician, pianist
- Instrument: Piano
- Years active: 2001–present

Shira Shaked (Hebrew: שירה שקד; born 1981) is an Israeli concert pianist and musician.

== Early life ==
Shaked was born in Tel Aviv and started playing the piano at the age of four. Between 1989 and 1999 she studied with Adina Wertheim at the Israel Conservatory of Music Tel Aviv, where she graduated with honors in 1999.

She served in the Israel Defense Forces between 1999 and 2001 as an "Excelled Musician". While in the military, Shaked began studying at the Samuel Rubin Israel Academy of Music (nowadays the Buchmann-Mehta School of Music) with Prof. Michael Boguslavsky and Dr. Mark Shaviner, both students of pianist Isser Slonim. In 2005 she received a B.Mus degree in piano performance. In 2005–2007, Shaked studied with Prof. Vadim Monastyrsky at the Jerusalem Academy of Music and Dance, and in 2007 received an M.Mus degree in piano performance. In 2011 Shaked moved to the United States to pursue doctoral studies with Prof. Gilbert Kalish at Stony Brook University, and in 2016 received a Doctor of Musical Arts degree in piano performance.

Shira Shaked currently resides in Tel Aviv with her spouse and their children.

== Career ==
From 2006 to 2009 Shaked collaborated with composer-choreographer Shlomi Frige and poet Nathan Zach, Israel Prize laureate, in the recording of two albums in which Zach recites his poems, accompanied by Frige's music. Shaked played piano in the recordings and took part in the arrangements. The first album, titled How Wonderful You Were, was released in 2008 and included a waltz for piano written by Zach's grandfather for the coronation ceremony of Queen Wilhelmina of the Netherlands. The album's release was followed by a tour, with Alex Ansky, Dan Toren and Doron "Shultz" Eyal alternating in Zach's stead. The second album, Love Grows at Nights, was released in 2011, with cover art by Menashe Kadishman.

Since 2008 Shaked has participated in recordings and performances of compositions and arrangements written by Israeli musician Erez Kariel for various projects including an album by guitarist-composer Yair Yona album, a tribute show for Frank Zappa and various soundtracks.

In 2008 she performed with singer-songwriter Amit Erez at the Tel Aviv Piano Festival at Suzanne Dellal Center for Dance and Theater. In 2010 she participated in the Eilat Chamber Music Festival.

In 2009 Shaked performed with violinist Pavel Vernikov on Israeli Russian-speaking television channel Israel Plus.

In 2012, and again in 2014, Shaked took part in various productions at the West Village Musical Theater Festival in New York.

In 2013 she participated in the Pittsburgh Jewish Music Festival, in a multimedia staging of the chamber opera The Dybbuk: Between Two Worlds by composer Ofer Ben-Amots at the New Hazlett Theater. Later that year Shaked performed with the Jerusalem Symphony Orchestra along with cellist Dmitry Yablonsky, violinist Janna Gandelman and conductor Roman Spitzer in a special edition of the Gabala International Music Festival in Israel.

In 2014 she performed with cellist Danielle Akta at the Lincoln Center for the Performing Arts' Jazz at Lincoln Center, at the Gala to mark the 75th anniversary of the America-Israel Cultural Foundation.

In 2014 Shira Shaked was invited to perform with violinist Maxim Vengerov at the Culture Palace in Tel Aviv. Shaked performed duo pieces with Vengerov and also together with the Soloists Orchestra of the International Menuhin Music Academy, Switzerland. Several hundred residents of the Gaza envelope were in attendance, invited as a tribute following operation Protective Edge, which had taken place not long prior. In 2015 Shaked performed another duo concert with Vengerov at the Culture Palace in a unique setting: titled 'Music and the Universe', the program in its entirety was performed in total darkness and twice in a row, in order for listeners to experience live music with minimal distraction and be given an impression that beyond that of a first listen.

In 2016 Shaked performed with Akta at the Verizon Center in Washington, D.C., during the AIPAC Policy Conference, at an event headlined by Vice President Joe Biden.

== Discography ==
=== Solo Releases ===
- RED (2017)

=== With Nathan Zach and Shlomi Frige ===
- How Wonderful You Were (2008)
- Love Grows at Nights (2011)

=== As Guest Musician ===
- Amit Erez – Last Night When I Tried To Sleep I Felt The Ocean with My Fingertips, Anova Music (2009) (piano on Cloudbusting (bonus track))
- Yair Yona – Remember, Anova Music (2009) / Strange Attractors Audio House (2010) (string arrangement on Skinny Fists)
- Yair Yona – World Behind Curtains, Anova Music (2010) / Strange Attractors Audio House (2011) (piano on It's Not the Heat (It's the Humidity))

=== Appearances on Soundtracks ===
- Me and Everything I'm Not – Director: Maya Brinner (2010)
- Po Kashur Ha'Kelev – Director: Ron Feldman (2010)
- If I Forget You – Director: Mariana Krylov (2015)
- Scrawl Magazine – Music for issue #8 (2017)
- M I A – Director: Galia Barkol (2017)
