= All Shook Up (disambiguation) =

"All Shook Up" is a song by Elvis Presley.

All Shook Up may also refer to:

- All Shook Up (musical), a jukebox musical featuring the music of Elvis Presley
- All Shook Up (Cheap Trick album)
- All Shook Up (Sophie Koh album)
- "All Shook Up" (Sledge Hammer!), an episode of the TV series Sledge Hammer!
- "All Shook Up", an episode of the TV series Lois & Clark: The New Adventures of Superman
