= Shooks Run (Colorado Springs, Colorado) =

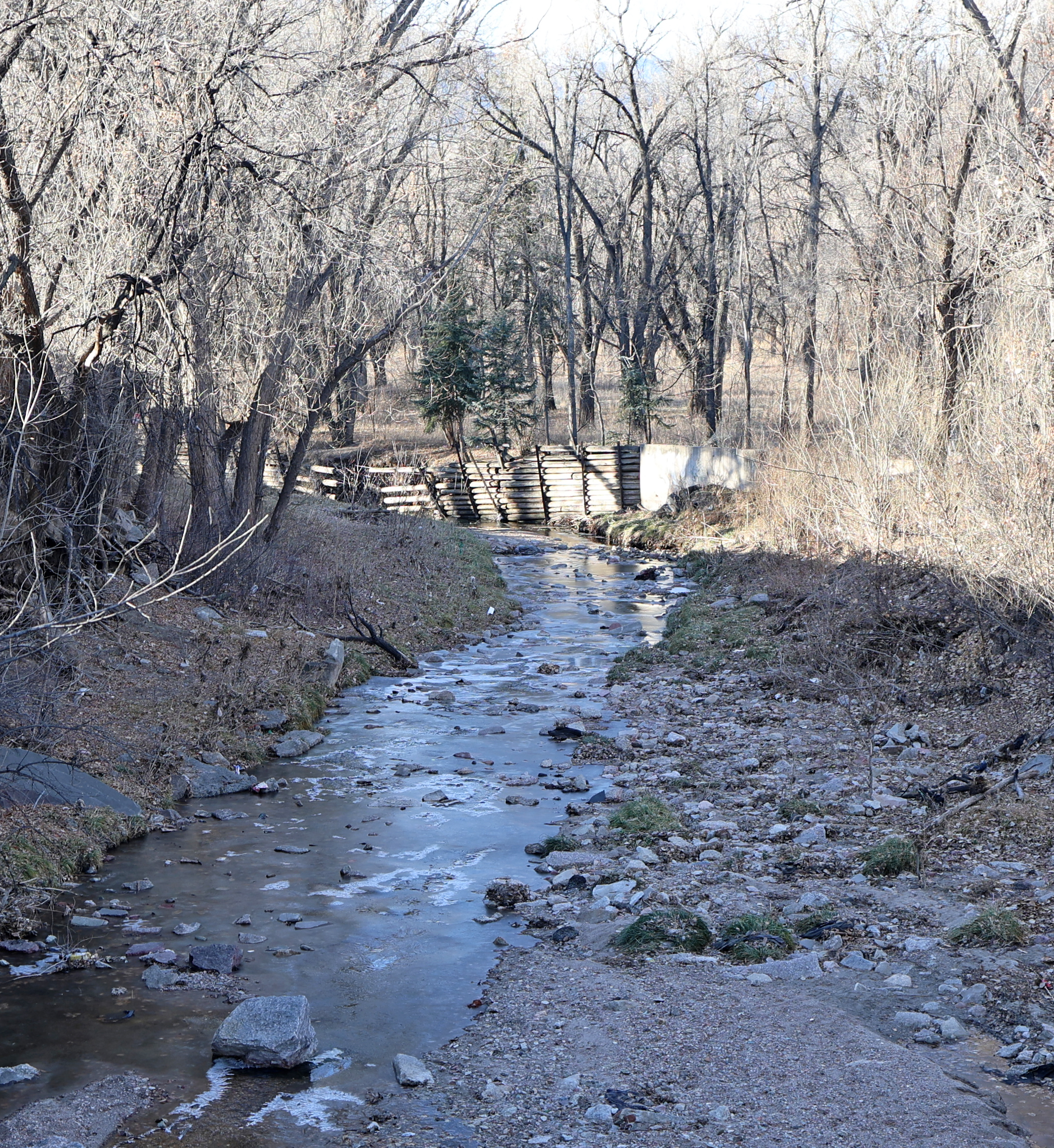
- Shooks Run (2025)

- The location of the creek's mouth in Colorado
- Etymology: Named for brothers Denton and Peter Shook

Physical characteristics
- Source
  - location: Colorado Springs, Colorado
  - coordinates: 38°54′39.98″N 104°43′55.91″W
- Mouth
  - location: Colorado Springs, Colorado
  - coordinates: 38°48′55.97″N 104°49′1.91″W
  - elevation: 5,893 feet (1,796 meters)

Basin features
- Progression: Fountain Creek → Arkansas → Mississippi

Shooks Run is a stream in Colorado Springs, Colorado, U.S. It is a tributary of Fountain Creek and drains the urban area of Colorado Springs.

== Course ==
Originally, the creek rose near Templeton Gap. However, flooding in the late 19th and early 20th centuries led to the creation of the Templeton Gap Floodway, a flood control channel that re-routes the upper portion of Shooks Run, diverting the flow west to Monument Creek. Now, Shooks Run starts near the Patty Jewett Golf Course and flows south to its confluence with Fountain Creek near Interstate 25 and Nevada Avenue in Colorado Springs.

== Names ==
The creek was named after brothers Denton and Peter Shook, Iowa natives who ran cattle on 80 acres (32 hectares) at the creek's mouth starting in 1865.

Shooks Run lends its name to Middle Shooks Run, a Colorado Springs neighborhood. Novelist and historian Frank Waters grew up there.

Also, the Shooks Run Trail, an urban hiking and biking trail, runs along part of the creek.

== See also ==
- List of rivers of Colorado
- Middle Shooks Run
