= Shake It Off (disambiguation) =

"Shake It Off" is a 2014 song by Taylor Swift.

Shake It Off may also refer to:

== Songs ==
- "Shake It Off" (Mariah Carey song), 2005
- "Shake It Off", a 1978 song by B. T. Express from Shout! (Shout It Out)
- "Shake It Off", a 1983 song by Stiff Little Fingers, later included on Get a Life
- "Shake It Off", a 1998 song by Spoon from A Series of Sneaks
- "Shake It Off", a 1998 song by Robert Bradley's Blackwater Surprise
- "Shake It Off", a 2000 song by Take 5
- "Shake It Off", a 2000 song by Wilco from Sky Blue Sky
- "Shake It Off", a 2001 song by Henry Threadgill from Everybodys Mouth's a Book
- "Shake It Off", a 2002 song by DJ Jazzy Jeff from The Magnificent
- "Shake It Off", a 2002 song by Tela from Double Dose
- "Shake It Off", a 2004 song by Mandy Moore from The Best of Mandy Moore
- "Shake It Off", a 2005 song by GoGoGo Airheart from Rats! Sing! Sing!
- "Shake It Off", a 2005 song by Hi-Five from The Return
- "Shake It Off", a 2005 song by Lyrics Born from Same !@$ Different Day
- "Shake It Off", a 2005 song by Supersuckers from Devil's Food
- "Shake It Off", a 2006 song by El Perro del Mar from El Perro del Mar
- "Shake It Off", a 2006 song by Krystal Meyers from Dying for a Heart
- "Shake It Off", a 2007 song by Annabel Fay from Annabel Fay
- "Shake It Off", a 2007 song by Corbin Bleu from Another Side
- "Shake It Off", a 2007 song by Dizmas from Tension
- "Shake It Off", a 2007 song by Joseph Arthur & the Lonely Astronauts from Let's Just Be
- "Shake It Off", a 2009 song by Agnes Monica from Sacredly Agnezious
- "Shake It Off", a 2009 song by KJ-52 from Five-Two Television
- "Shake It Off", a 2011 song by The Medics
- "Shake It Off", a 2012 song by Meisa Kuroki from Unlocked
- "Shake It Off", a 2013 song by Michael Martin Murphey from Red River Drifter
- "Shake It Off", a 2013 song by Secondhand Serenade
- "Shake It Off", a 2013 song by The Blow Monkeys
- "Shake It Off", a 2013 song by The Spinto Band
- "Shake It Off", a 2015 song by Hurry
- "Shake It Off", a song by Hal Linton
- "Shake It Off (Walking With The King of Funk)", a 2004 song by Stripper's Union from Stripper's Union Local 518

== Albums ==
- Shake It Off, a 2002 album by Gerald Eaton
- Shake It Off, a 2008 album by Chevelle Franklyn
- Shake It Off, a 2010 album by Brooke Miller
- Shake It Off, a 2013 album by Ash Bowers

== See also ==
- Shake It Out, a song by Florence and the Machine
- Shake It Up
