= Shakes (timber) =

Defect in timber

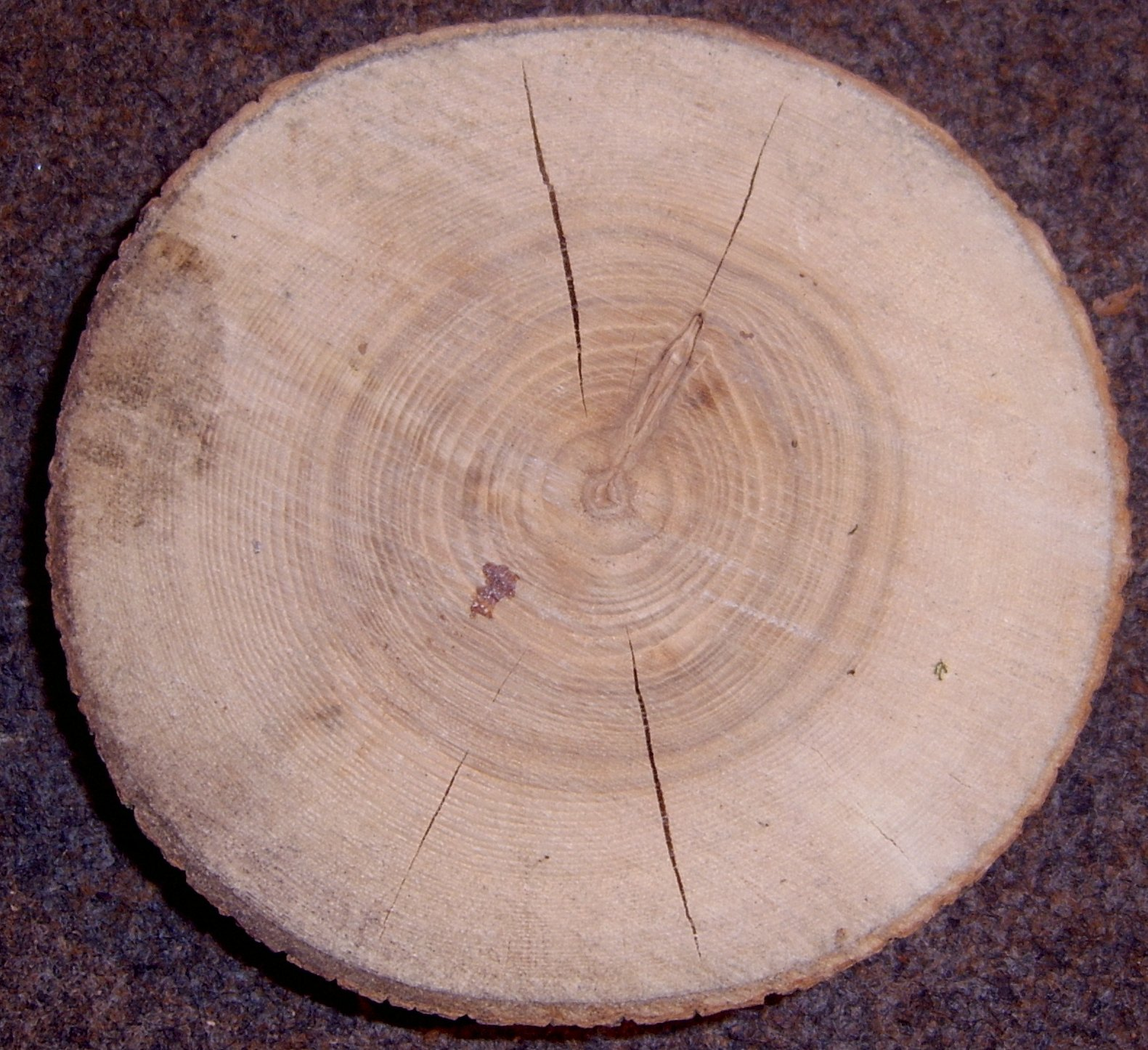
Cross-section of wood showing heart shakes

Shakes are cracks in timber. Arising in cut timber they generally cause a reduction in strength. When found in a log they can result in a significant amount of waste, when a log is converted to timber. Apart from heart shakes, often found in trees felled past their best, shakes in a log have no effect on the strength of shake free timber obtained therefrom.

They are often seen in oak-framed buildings, which are constructed of oak which has not been dried and thus cracks while drying. Due to the immense strength of the oak beams, they are not a cause for concern in a properly engineered building, and are considered part of the charm of the style.

In the majority of cases of shake, the underlying cause is a weakening of the wood due to action by anaerobic bacteria which have entered the tree stem through the root system. Researchers have isolated anaerobic and facultative anaerobic bacteria from shake surfaces, in particular anaerobic Clostridium species.

Research suggests that shakes develop due to natural stresses in wood which has been weakened by bacterial degradation of the middle-lamella between cells.

== Heart shake ==
Heart shake is a crack in the heartwood, near the centre of the tree. It is caused by poor seasoning, or by using trees felled past maturity.

== Star shake ==
A crack or cracks propagating from near the edge of the log towards the centre, usually along the line of the medullary rays, causing the wood to shrink more at right angles to the medullary rays than along them, causing warping of anything made from the wood. The cause is often rapid or uneven seasoning, causing the outside of the log to shrink faster than the heart. Exposure to the elements can cause star shakes, as can frost during the growth of the tree.

== Frost shake ==
Frost shake begins on the outside where moisture from rain or other means has penetrated, and freezes, causing damage to the wood on the inside.

== Cup or ring shake ==
A cup or ring shake follows the line of annual rings. The separation of the rings is generally caused during the growth of the tree, either by a check in the growth, or by bending and twisting under high winds.

== Thunder shake or upset ==
A Thunder Shake, also known as an Upset, is a natural defect in wood that is across the grain and hard to detect until the boards are being planed. It is caused by shock to the wood, such as thunder or concussion during felling. This fault seriously weakens the timber. Various causes are suggested, such as felling across obstructions, and failure inside the growing tree caused by high winds, growth stresses, etc.

== See also ==
- Dry rot
- Knots (wood)
- Wandering heart
- Wood drying
