= The Shake (band) =

American indie rock band

The Shake is a New York City indie rock band. The band was active from 2005 - 2012. The band was originally formed by Jon Merkin (lead vocals, guitar), Eliad Shapiro (lead guitar, vocals), Jeremy Stein (bass, vocals), and Andrew McNellis (drums). Following McNellis' departure in 2008, Vishal Kumar joined the band as their drummer. Kumar departed in 2009, and was replaced on drums by Daniel Kirschen. Shapiro departed in 2010 to attend Cornell Law School, and was replaced by Mike Serman on lead guitar. The group disbanded in 2012.

== Discography ==
The Shake released three LPs and one EP.

- Kick It (2006)
- Well, Oh Well (2008)
- The Shake Go Crazy (2009)
- Sweet N Sour EP (2012)

For The Shake's third album, The Shake Go Crazy, the band collaborated with record producer, Gregory Lattimer, known for his work on Albert Hammond Jr.'s first solo album, Yours to Keep.

== Awards and notoriety ==
In 2009, The Shake was voted number 32 on The Deli Magazine's best bands in New York City, and #1 best emerging Alternative Rock band in New York. In 2010, The Shake was named one of the top 28 bands of the CMJ Music Marathon by Blackbook Magazine.

== Popular songs ==
The Shake has had its music licensed in several high-profile movies and TV shows, including License to Wed, True Blood, One Tree Hill, 90210, and Workaholics.
