= Shaker =

Shaker or Shakers may refer to:

== Religious groups ==
- Shakers, a historically significant Christian sect
- Indian Shakers, a smaller Christian denomination

== Objects and instruments ==
- Shaker (musical instrument), an indirect struck idiophone
- Cocktail shaker, a device used to mix beverages (usually alcoholic) by shaking
- Shaker (salt and pepper), condiment dispensers designed to allow diners to distribute grains of edible salt and ground peppercorns
- Shaker (laboratory), a device used to stir liquids in chemistry and biology
- Shaker (testing device), a vibration device used in endurance testing or modal testing
- Shaker scoop, an auto component
- Shale shakers, a type of solids control equipment

== Music ==
- Shaker (musical instrument), an indirect struck idiophone
- Shaker (Lil Shaker), a Ghanaian recording artist, songwriter, producer and performer
- The Shakers (band) a pseudonym for the band Kingsize Taylor and the Dominoes
- Los Shakers, a Uruguayan band
- Shaker (David Johansen album), 2002
- Shaker (Akina Nakamori album)
- "Shaker", a song by Nebula from the 2001 album Charged

== People with the name ==
- Shaker Aamer (born 1966), Saudi citizen held in Guantanamo Bay
- Shaker Ahmed (born 1992), a Bangladeshi cricket player
- Shaker Al-Nabulsi (1940–2014), an American author
- Shaker Asad (born 1979), a Palestinian former soccer midfielder
- Shaker Elsayed (born 1951), the Imam of the Dar Al-Hijrah mosque
- Shaker Ismail (born 1927), an Iraqi former international football player
- Shaker Mahmoud (born 1963), an Iraqi football midfielder
- Shaker Zahra, professor of strategy and entrepreneurship, Carlson School of Management
- Hakeem Shaker (born 1963), a former Iraqi football player and manager
- Hany Shaker (1952–2026), an Egyptian singer, actor and composer
- Huda Sajjad Mahmoud Shaker (born 1978), an Iraqi politician
- Jalal Shaker, a former Iraqi football defender
- Mahmoud Shaker (1926–1980), a senior commander in the Egyptian Air Force
- Masihuddin Shaker, Bangladeshi film director and writer
- Mohamed Shaker (1933–2018), an Egyptian diplomat and political scientist
- Mohammed Ali Shaker (born 1997), an Emirati footballer
- Mohammad-Hossein Shaker, an Iranian retired military officer
- Nadhim Shaker (1958–2020), Iraqi football player and coach
- Noor Shaker, a Syrian entrepreneur and computer scientist
- Salam Shaker (born 1986), a former Iraqi professional footballer
- Samir Shaker (born 1958), Iraqi former professional footballer
- Tarek Shaker, an Egyptian politician
- Thamer Shaker (born 1975), a Saudi businessman, management consultant, and writer
- Zaid ibn Shaker (1934–2002), former commander-in-chief of the Jordanian military
- Lisa Sthalekar "Shaker" (born 1979), Indian-Australian cricketer

== Other uses ==
- Shaker, one of the players executing the shake and bake strategy in the sport pickleball
- Baker University, Baldwin City, Kansas, US
- Shaker (gene), an animal gene
- The Shakers (film), a 1974 documentary film
- Bury F.C. or the Shakers, an English football club
- Shaker (Diagnosis: Murder episode)

== See also ==
- Shaker furniture, distinctive furniture developed by the Shakers
- Shaker Heights, Ohio, a suburb of Cleveland in the USA
- Shakir (name)
- Chaker (disambiguation)
