= If Memory Serves Us Well =

Studio album by Death of Samantha
- Released: December 3, 2013
- Recorded: December 22, 2011
- Studio: Venue Studios, Euclid, OH
- Genre: Post-punk
- Length: 74:55
- Label: St. Valentine
- Producer: Death of Samantha

Death of Samantha chronology
Come All Ye Faithless (1989)	If Memory Serves Us Well (2013)

Professional ratings
Review scores
Source	Rating
AllMusic	4/5 stars
PopMatters	(7/10)

If Memory Serves Us Well is an album by post-punk band Death of Samantha, released on December 3, 2013 by St. Valentine Records. It comprises re-recordings of previously released Death of Samantha tracks.

== Track listing ==
All lyrics are written by John Petkovic; all music is composed by John Petkovic, except "Couldn't Forget 'Bout That (One Item)" and "Blood Creek" by Doug Gillard.

No.	Title	Originally from (date)	Length
1.	"Coca-Cola and Licorice"	Strungout on Jargon (1986)	4:01
2.	"Bed of Fire"	Strungout on Jargon (1986)	2:05
3.	"Now It's Your Turn (To Be a Martyr)"	Come All Ye Faithless (1989)	3:36
4.	"Conviction"	Strungout on Jargon (1986)	3:29
5.	"Couldn't Forget 'Bout That (One Item)"	Strungout on Jargon (1986)	6:34
6.	"Savior City"	Where the Women Wear the Glory and the Men Wear the Pants (1988)	4:51
7.	"Good Friday" (Take Two Edit)	Where the Women Wear the Glory and the Men Wear the Pants (1988)	5:49
8.	"Rosenberg Summer"	Rosenberg Summer 7" (1989)	4:16
9.	"Sexual Dreaming"	Strungout on Jargon (1986)	3:09
10.	"Blood & Shaving Cream"	Laughing in the Face of a Dead Man (1986)	3:02
11.	"Geisha Girl"	Come All Ye Faithless (1989)	5:48
12.	"Monkey Face"	Where the Women Wear the Glory and the Men Wear the Pants (1988)	3:24
13.	"Simple as That"	Strungout on Jargon (1986)	3:20
14.	"Yellow Fever"	Laughing in the Face of a Dead Man (1986)	3:31
15.	"Turquoise Hand"	Strungout on Jargon (1986)	3:05
16.	"Harlequin Tragedy"	Where the Women Wear the Glory and the Men Wear the Pants (1988)	4:47
17.	"Amphetamine"	Amphetamine/Simple as That 7" (1985)	4:15
18.	"Blood Creek"	Where the Women Wear the Glory and the Men Wear the Pants (1988)	5:53

== Personnel ==
Adapted from the If Memory Serves Us Well liner notes.

Death of Samantha

- Doug Gillard – guitar, backing vocals
- David James – bass guitar, backing vocals
- John Petkovic – lead vocals, guitar, clarinet
- Steve-O – drums

Production and additional personnel

- Death of Samantha – production, mixing
- Paul Gold – mastering
- Travis Harrison – mixing
- Michael Seifert – recording
- Craig Semetko – photography

== Release history ==
Region	Date	Label	Format	Catalog
United States	2013	St. Valentine	CD, LP	SVR-30
