= The Beatles at the Cavern Club =

Performances of the Beatles at the Cavern Club between 1961 and 1963

The Cavern Club at 10 Mathew Street, in Liverpool was the venue where the Beatles' UK popularity started. John Lennon, Paul McCartney, George Harrison and Pete Best were first seen by Brian Epstein at the club. Epstein eventually became their manager, going on to secure them a record contract. Best was replaced by Ringo Starr on 16 August 1962, which upset many Beatles fans. After taunts of, "Pete forever, Ringo never!", one agitated fan headbutted Harrison in the club.

The Cavern Club was the third club managed by Alan Sytner, which originally opened as a jazz-only club on 16 January 1957, being styled after the Paris venue, Le Caveau. The Quarrymen made their first appearance at the club on 7 August 1957, but by 9 February 1961, when the group first performed there under their new name of the Beatles, the club was under the ownership of Ray McFall. The Cavern Club gradually became synonymous with the emerging Merseybeat music genre, rapidly becoming the most famous club in Britain. According to the club's resident DJ, Bob Wooler, the Beatles made 292 appearances at the club between 1961 and 1963, culminating in a final appearance at the venue on 3 August 1963—one month after the group recorded "She Loves You", and six months before their first trip to the United States.

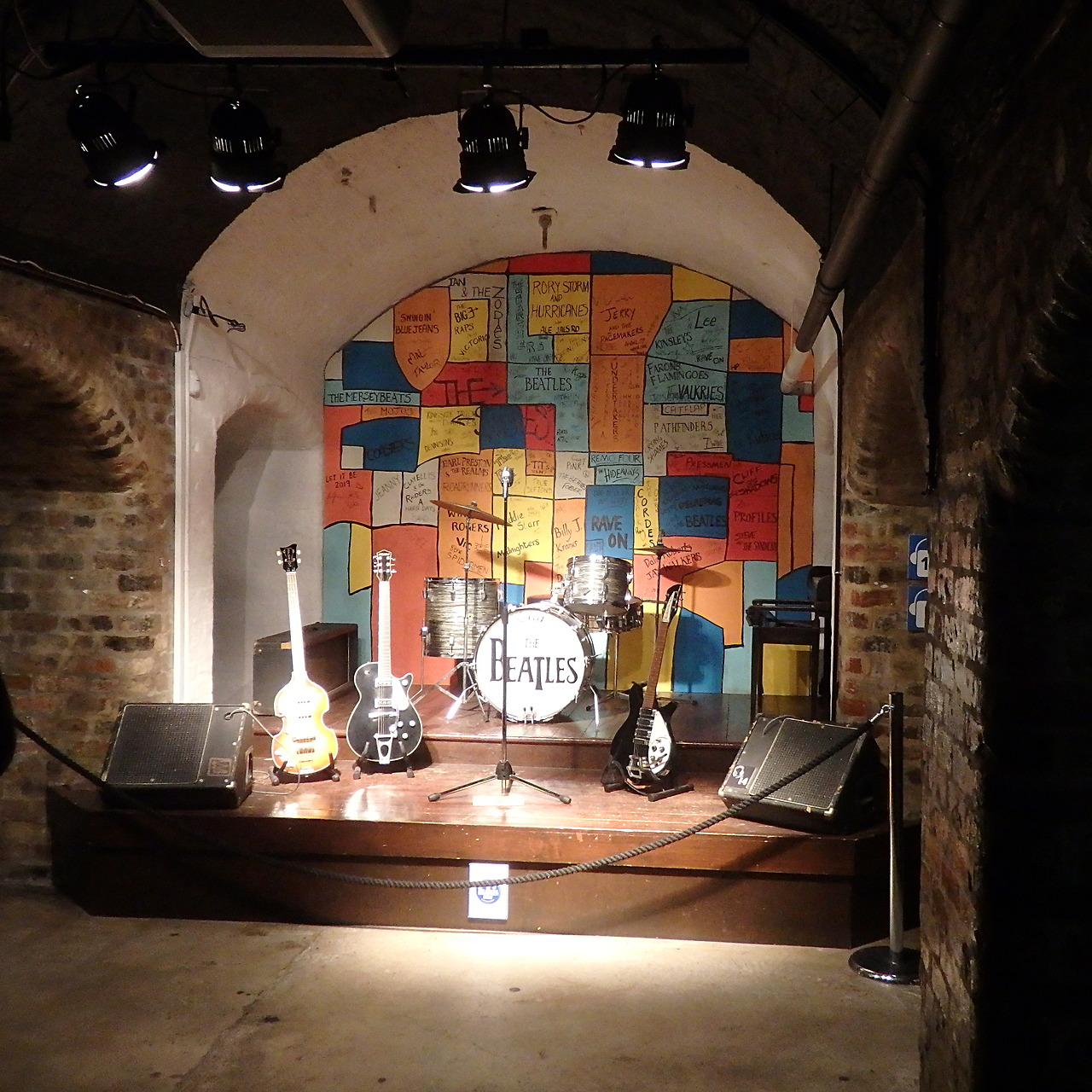
Replica of the stage of the Cavern Club, The Beatles Story, Liverpool (2020)

The club changed hands several more times before eventually being demolished to allow construction of an underground railway ventilation duct, before being used as a car park. A replica of the club was built on "75 per cent of the original site" in 1984, built with 15,000 bricks retrieved from the original club site. On 16 January 1997, a sculpture of Lennon was unveiled outside The New Cavern Club, and on 14 December 1999, McCartney performed there, playing his last concert of the 20th century and publicising his album, Run Devil Run.

== Background ==
Owned by Sytner, the club originally opened on 16 January 1957 as a jazz-only club, which was one of three jazz clubs he managed. He styled the club after the Paris venue, Le Caveau, as the French club was also a cellar. The Cavern was an arched cellar built of bricks, under a seven-storey fruit warehouse. It had previously been used as a wine cellar, and as an air raid shelter during World War II. Because of its position underground, it was well known as being damp, and very hot when the club was full.

In early August 1957, whilst playing golf at the Childwall Golf Club, with Sytner's father, Dr. Joseph Sytner, Nigel Walley—a friend of Lennon's who was an apprentice golf professional at the Lee Park Golf Club—asked Dr. Sytner if his son would book the Quarrymen at The Cavern Club in Mathew Street, Liverpool. Dr. Sytner suggested that the group should play at the golf club first, so as to assess their talent. The group set up in the downstairs lounge of the golf club, and were surprised when nearly one hundred people filed in to listen. The performance was a success, and a hat was later passed around that collected almost £15; significantly more than other groups were paid at the time. Alan Sytner phoned Walley a week later and offered the group an interlude spot on 7 August, playing skiffle between the performances of three skiffle bands at the club: Ron McKay's Skiffle Group, Dark Town Skiffle Group, and The Deltones Skiffle Group.

Before their first Cavern Club performance, the group argued amongst themselves about the set list, as rock 'n roll songs were not allowed at the club, but skiffle was tolerated. After starting with a skiffle song, Lennon told the others to start playing "Don't Be Cruel", by Elvis Presley. Banjo-player Rod Davis warned Lennon that the audience would "eat you alive", which Lennon ignored, starting the song by himself, which forced the others to join in. Halfway through, Sytner pushed his way through the audience and handed Lennon a note which read, "Cut out the bloody rock 'n roll". In 1959, Sytner sold the club to an accountant, McFall, for £2,750. In 1960, the Quarrymen changed their name, initially to the Silver Beetles, and finally to the Beatles, before their initial residency in Hamburg.

The Beatles' history with the Cavern Club is also explored in two documentary films: I Was There: When the Beatles Played the Cavern (2011), directed by John Piper; and Good Ol' Freda (2013), directed by Ryan White. (See note below in "Epstein".)

== Epstein and The Cavern ==
The Beatles' name was first noticed by Epstein in the first issue of Bill Harry's Mersey Beat magazine (which Epstein successfully sold in his NEMS music store), on numerous posters around Liverpool, and on the front page of the second issue of Mersey Beat. before asking journalist Harry who they were.

The Beatles—then consisting of Lennon, McCartney, Harrison, and Best—were due to perform a lunchtime concert in The Cavern Club on 9 November 1961, as part of a residency, for £3, 15 shillings a concert. According to Sytner, Epstein had visited the club quite a few times previously on Saturday nights, once asking Sytner to book a group for his twenty-first birthday party. Epstein asked Harry to arrange for Epstein and his assistant, Alistair Taylor, to watch the Beatles perform, so Epstein and Taylor were allowed into the club without queuing, with a welcome message being announced over the club's public-address system by Wooler, the resident DJ. Epstein later talked about the performance:

I was immediately struck by their music, their beat, and their sense of humour on stage—and, even afterwards, when I met them, I was struck again by their personal charm. And it was there that, really, it all started.

After the performance, Epstein and Taylor went into the dressing room, which he later called "as big as a broom cupboard", to talk to them.

The Beatles, who were all regular NEMS customers, immediately recognised Epstein, but before Epstein could congratulate them on their performance, Harrison said, "And what brings Mr. Epstein here?" Epstein replied with, "We just popped in to say hello. I enjoyed your performance". He introduced Taylor, who merely nodded a greeting, and then said, "Well done, then, Goodbye," and left. Epstein and Taylor went to Peacock's restaurant in Hackins Hey for lunch, and during the meal Epstein asked Taylor what he thought about the group. Taylor replied that he honestly thought they were "absolutely awful", but there was something "remarkable" about them. Epstein waited a long time before saying anything further, eventually saying, "I think they're tremendous!" Later, when Epstein was paying the bill, he grabbed Taylor's arm and said, "Do you think I should manage them?"

The Beatles were scheduled to play at the club over the next three weeks, and Epstein was always there to watch them. Epstein contacted Allan Williams (their previous promoter/manager), to confirm that Williams no longer had any ties to them, but Williams advised Epstein "not to touch them with a fucking barge pole [to stay away]", because of a concert percentage the group had refused to pay him while playing in Hamburg. Epstein later signed singer Cilla Black, who had been working as a hat-check girl in the club. The Beatles were recorded playing live at the club on 22 August 1962, by Granada Television, and their producer at EMI, George Martin, later thought of recording them live there, calling the projected album Off The Beatle Track, but soon realised the club had terrible acoustics.

Brian Epstein at The Cavern Club in 1963

Epstein also hired Beatles secretary Freda Kelly, whose memories of him, the Cavern and the Beatles over the group's duration are detailed in the documentaries noted above and in the 2013 documentary Good Ol' Freda.

=== Dress code ===
Although Epstein had had no prior experience of artist management, he made it clear that he wanted to change the Beatles' early dress-code and attitude on stage, as they wore blue jeans and leather jackets, smoked, ate and swore, stopped and started songs when they felt like it, pretended to hit each other, and turned their backs to the audience. Epstein put a stop to their behaviour, insisting they wear more suitable clothes, and later suggested the famous synchronised bow at the end of their performances. Epstein: "I encouraged them, at first, to get out of the leather jackets and jeans, and I wouldn't allow them to appear in jeans after a short time, and then, after that step, I got them to wear sweaters on stage, and then, very reluctantly, eventually, suits".

McCartney was the first to agree with Epstein's ideas, believing it was due to Epstein's RADA training. Lennon was against the idea of suits and ties, but later said, "Yeah, man, all right, I'll wear a suit. I'll wear a bloody balloon if somebody's going to pay me". According to McCartney, "The gigs went up in stature and though the pay went up only a little bit, it did go up", and that the group was "now playing better places". Epstein pushed McFall to raise the group's fee for a concert at the club from the previous £3, 15 shillings, to £10. Another improvement was that the group was now far more organised; having a single concert diary in which to record bookings, rather than using whoever's diary was to hand.

== Worldwide interest ==
During their "Welcome Home" session at The Cavern in June 1962, the Beatles gave what Wooler described as "one of their finest ever performances", drawing "a feverish reaction" that was equal, Wooler said, to the "Beatlemania" that broke out nationwide a few months later. The Cavern Club's popularity grew; rapidly becoming the most famous club in Britain.

The Beatles' press officer, Tony Barrow, wrote a book called On the Scene at the Cavern, using the pseudonym Alistair Griffin. "On the Scene at the Cavern," a book including text as well as photographs from the crowds and performances at the club, was celebrated at a launch party at The Cavern Club in August 1964. In the book, Barrow described in vivid detail the scene at the Cavern Club in its heyday. "Even on a night when the Beatles weren’t billed to appear there were odds-on chances you’d find Paul or George or one of the other boys propping up the counter of The Cavern’s coke bar and chatting to groups of fans," Barrow tells readers of "On the Scene at the Cavern". "And if you looked in at a lunchtime session Cillia Black would have checked your coat into the cloakroom or spooned out a plate of tomato soup for you." On the Scene at the Cavern" was published by Panther Books, and it was reissued in 1984 with additional pictures and text from the days of the Cavern Club. Barrow also wrote for The Beatles Monthly Book at this time using the pseudonym Frederick James. And a "Cavern trip to Hamburg" was organised, involving a visit to The Star-Club where the Beatles had been a resident group.

International attention became regular at The Cavern Club, with television cameras, radio broadcasters and press representatives from all over Europe visiting the club, along with reporters from the US magazines, Time, Life and Newsweek. It was also visited by numerous international celebrities, including Chet Atkins, Anna Neagle and Arthur Fiedler. When The Cavern grew to incorporate adjacent premises and a recording studio and new stage were built, there was such a great international demand for what the club sold as "Beatleboard" (pieces of wood from the old stage where the Beatles had played so many times), that it took four months to process the orders.

== List of Cavern appearances (abbreviated) ==
According to DJ Wooler, over the course of a two-and-a-half-year period which began when they first played at the venue in February 1961, the Beatles made a total of 292 appearances at the club, although author Barry Miles, in his book The Beatles Diary Volume 1: The Beatles Years states that it was 275 times. Their final performance at the club was on 3 August 1963. During their time at the club, the Beatles also had residencies in Hamburg.

Date	Event
21 February 1961	The Beatles made their first appearance. As a jazz club, it was experimenting with allowing rock 'n roll, at lunchtimes only.
21 March 1961	Second appearance by the Beatles. Tuesday had become "Blue Jeans Guest Night". The evening featured Dale Roberts & The Jay Walkers, The Remo Four and the Beatles.
14 July 1961	The Beatles' "Welcome Home" session (after their second Hamburg residency), which also featured Johnny Sandon and The Remo Four and The White Eagles Jazz Band.
25 July 1961	Another "Blue Jeans Guest Night", when the Beatles performed with Gerry & The Pacemakers and the Remo Four.
2 August 1961	The first of a long series of the Beatles' resident nights.
1 September 1961	During a traditional jazz evening, the Beatles performed in the interval as the only rock group.
23 December 1961	During an all-night session, including jazz, the Beatles performed along with Gerry & the Pacemakers and Johnny Sandon and the Searchers.
28 February 1962	The Beatles appeared along with Gerry & the Pacemakers and Johnny Sandon and the Searchers.
5 April 1962	The Beatles' fan club night, which also featured a performance by the Four Jays.
7 April 1962	Between two sets by the Saints Jazz Band, the Beatles gave a two-hour performance.
9 June 1962	The Beatles "Welcome Home" session after their third Hamburg residency.
1 July 1962	The first Cavern evening with no jazz. Performing are the Beatles, the Swinging Blue Jeans, Gene Vincent, and Sounds Incorporated.
1 August 1962	The Beatles, with Gerry & the Pacemakers and the Merseybeats.
28 August 1962	Another "Blue Jeans Guest Night". The Beatles performed along with the first Birmingham group to feature, Gerry Levene and the Avengers.
9 September 1962	The Beatles, with Billy J. Kramer and the Coasters, and a novelty singer, Clinton Ford.
12 September 1962	A London singer, Simone Jackson, performed with the Beatles as her backing group.
12 October 1962	The Beatles perform along with Little Richard.
5 December 1962	The Beatles, and Gerry & the Pacemakers.
20 January 1963	The Beatles, with the Dennisons, the Swinging Blue Jeans and the Merseybeats.
3 February 1963	The Cavern's "Rhythm & Blues Marathon": the Beatles, the Hollies, the Merseybeats, the Fourmost, the Swinging Blue Jeans and Kingsize Taylor and the Dominoes.
12 April 1963	The Cavern's Good Friday session, headed by the Beatles and featuring seven other local bands, among them the Road Runners, Faron's Flamingos and the Dennisons.
3 August 1963	The Beatles make their final and 292nd appearance at the club. They received a fee of £300 pounds for the performance.

=== New Cavern Club ===
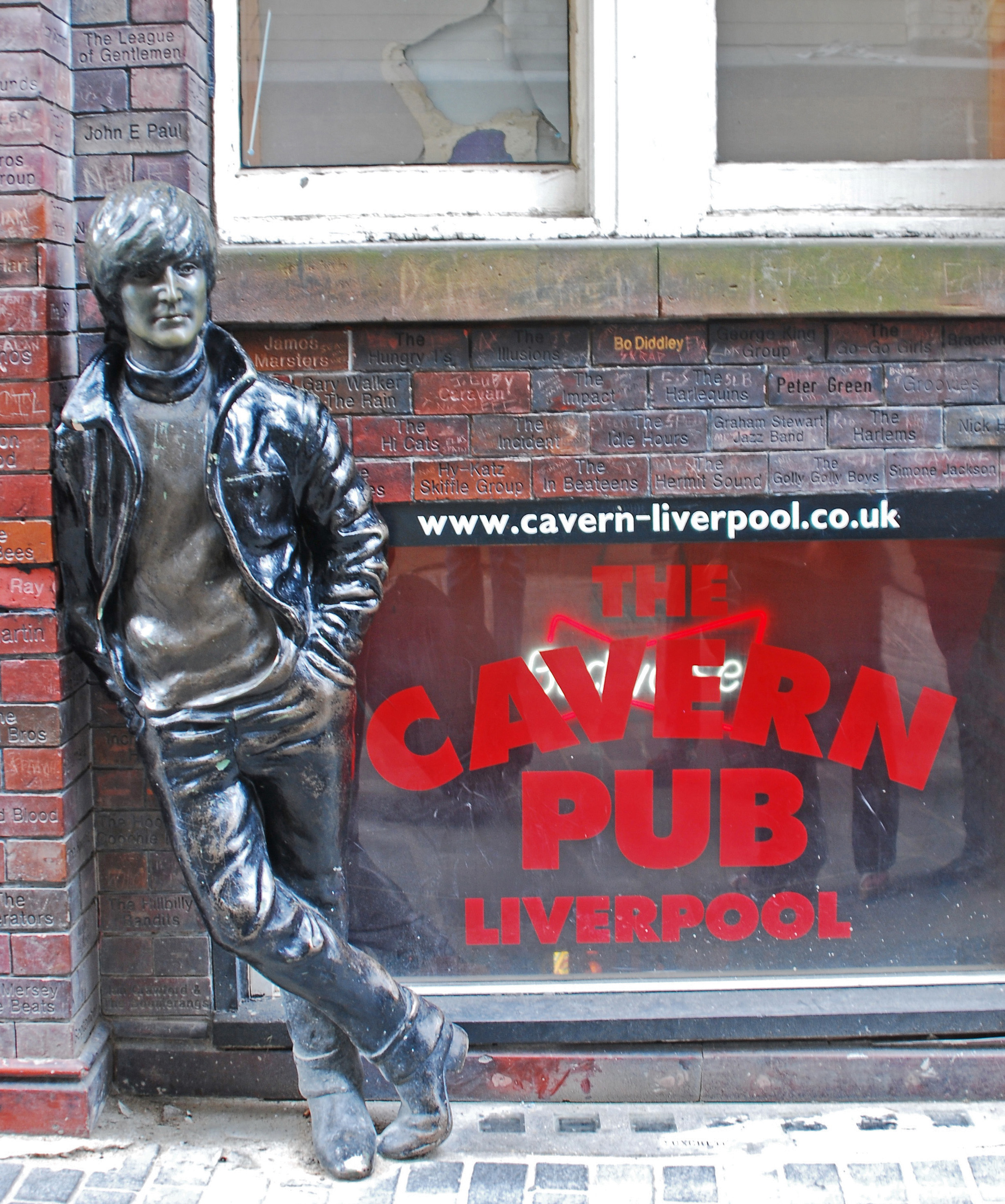
The sculpture of John Lennon outside The New Cavern Club was unveiled on 16 January 1997.

On 3 August 1963, a month after recording "She Loves You", the Beatles performed at the club for the last time. McFall ran the club until 1965, before closing it due to bankruptcy. The fans of the club were incensed at the closure, and barricaded themselves inside. The club changed hands several more times before eventually being demolished in 1973 to allow construction of an underground railway ventilation duct, before being used as a car park. A replica of the club was built on "75 percent of the original site" in 1984, and supposedly built with 15,000 bricks retrieved from the original club site.

On 16 January 1997, a sculpture of Lennon was unveiled outside The New Cavern Club. On 14 December 1999, McCartney performed at the club, playing his last concert of the 20th century and publicising his album, Run Devil Run, with backing musicians David Gilmour, Mick Green, Ian Paice and Pete Wingfield.

== See also ==
- Outline of the Beatles
- The Beatles timeline
