= Come All Ye Faithless =

Studio album by Death of Samantha
- Released: 1989
- Genre: Post-punk
- Length: 49:51
- Label: Homestead
- Producer: Alan McGinty, Chris Burgess

Death of Samantha chronology
Where the Women Wear the Glory and the Men Wear the Pants (1988)	Come All Ye Faithless (1989)	If Memory Serves Us Well (2013)

Come All Ye Faithless is the third and final studio album by post-punk band Death of Samantha, released in 1989 on Homestead Records.

== Release and reception ==
Professional ratings
Review scores
Source	Rating
AllMusic	4.5/5 stars

AllMusic critic Fred Beldin felt that it was an excellent record, writing: "Vocalist John Petkovic has an idiosyncratic snarl that might take getting used to, but once overcome the literary bent of the lyrics emerges and his sneer becomes part of the poetry. Doug Gillard pours out fluid lead guitar melodies that can break into atonal skronk at will without jarring the listener, and the rhythm section of Dave Swanson and Steve-O is tight but loose enough to swing in and out of the beat." He gave it 4.5 out of 5 stars, concluding that "Cobra Verde and Guided By Voices fans owe it to themselves to track down the records of this seminal band." Glenn Kenny of Trouser Press said that while Come All Ye Faithless is noticeably darker and lacks the exuberance of its predecessor, it "presents a terrific set of songs with which to crawl into a dark corner"

== Track listing ==
All tracks are written by Death of Samantha.

No.	Title	Length
1.	"Announcement"	0:27
2.	"Roses Rejoice"	6:22
3.	"Rosenberg Summer"	4:04
4.	"Geisha Girl"	4:50
5.	"Now It's Your Turn (To Be a Martyr)"	4:05
6.	"Looking for a Face"	4:48
7.	"Machine Language"	3:28
8.	"Oh, Laughter"	7:07
9.	"New Soldier, New Sailor"	3:56
10.	"Nostalgically Yours"	1:09
11.	"Come to Me"	8:14
12.	"Amnesia"	1:13

== Personnel ==
Adapted from the Come All Ye Faithless liner notes.

Death of Samantha

- Doug Gillard – guitar, melodica, organ, percussion, piano, vocals
- John Petkovic – vocals, guitar, clarinet, percussion
- Steve-O – drums, percussion, vocals
- Dave Swanson – bass guitar, drums, percussion, guitar, vocals

Additional musicians and production

- Chris Burgess – production
- Carolyn Cull – voices
- Alan McGinty – production
- Scott Savidge – saxophone
- Chedomir Stanisic – cello
- Rudolph Vasalino – illustrations, design
- Jim Wilson – piano, organ

== Release history ==
Region	Date	Label	Format	Catalog
United States	1989	Homestead	CD, LP	HMS 150
