= Phantom Tollbooth (band) =

American post-punk/noise rock band

Phantom Tollbooth was a post-punk/noise rock band from New York City. They played a style of post punk that included elements from jazz, noise rock, and art rock. This allowed Phantom Tollbooth to make sudden starts, stops, and tempo changes in their music. All of their albums were released in a four-year window between 1984 and 1988 on Homestead Records. In 2003, Guided by Voices frontman Robert Pollard created new lyrics and melodies for Phantom Tollbooth's 1988 album Power Toy. The resulting work was released as Beard of Lightning.

In 2025 the band are active again and playing shows including a September 2025 appearance at DromFest in Catskill, NY.

Phantom Tollbooth
Origin	New York City
Label	Homestead Records
Years active	1984 - 1988, 2025 - present

== Members ==
- Dave Rick (guitar/vocals), is a former member of B.A.L.L., Bongwater, King Missile, Shapir-O'Rama, When People Were Shorter and Lived Near the Water, Wide Right, Wonderama, Yo La Tengo. He currently plays with Atlantic Drone, Dew-Claw, The Martinets, Overcat and Stress Test.
- Gerard Smith (bass guitar/vocals), is a former member of The Royal Arctic Institute. He currently divides his time between Phantom Tollbooth and Matt Hunter & The Dusty Fates. Over the years he has played with various artists including Ben Miller (Destroy All Monsters (band)) and with Doug Gillard (Guided By Voices/Death of Samantha) in the group Doug Gillard Electric.
- Paul Andrew (drums)

== Former Members ==
- Jon Coats (drums), currently of Canartic and proprietor of dank disk records.

== Records ==
- Valley of the Gwangi 7" (1986)
- Phantom Tollbooth E.P. (1986)
- One Way Conversation (1987) album cover designed by Dave's sister Jenny
- Power Toy (1988)
- Daylight in the Quiet Zone E.P. (1990)
- Beard of Lightning (2003)
