= Parade On =

Studio album by Doug Gillard
- Released: April 2014
- Genres: Power pop, indie pop
- Length: 43:51
- Label: Nine Mile Records

Parade On
Review scores
| Source | Rating |
|---|---|
| AllMusic | 4/5 stars |

Parade On is a solo album by rock guitarist Doug Gillard, best known as a member of the indie pop and indie punk bands Guided by Voices, Death of Samantha, and Nada Surf, among others. The album was released in 2014 on Nine Mile Records.

== Background ==
Gillard is a New York City-based guitarist and songwriter, originally from Ohio. He has been a member of numerous indie pop and punk bands, most notably including Guided by Voices, Nada Surf, Death of Samantha, Bambi Kino, Cobra Verde, and Gem.

The 2014 album is Gillard's third full-length solo release. Assessing his limited name recognition as a solo artist, the music magazine Blurt quoted Death of Samantha's John Petkovic: "Doug deserves more attention, no doubt. But it's a larger thing — people are able to evaluate the name on the painting more than the painting. Doug has always been pretty dedicated to the painting, and that's a good thing." Petkovic praised Gillard as one "who comes at music and art through imagination ... attracted to sounds and parts. As a result, he's able to synthesize disparate pieces that other people wouldn't imagine fitting together until they saw the completed puzzle."

== Critical reception ==
Blurt wrote that Parade On blends hooks with layers of guitars in a display of diverse examples of "steady, riff-based rock," and the British music magazine Bearded wrote that Gillard's "cup brims over with subtle gems," making Parade On a record "worthy of its own ecstatic praise."

AllMusic's Mark Deming called Parade On an eclectic and superbly crafted album of "guitar-fueled rock & roll with an extra portion of pop hooks" and lyrics in "various degrees of bittersweet snark." Deming praised Gillard as a gifted songwriter, guitarist, producer, and arranger, whose multi-instrumental performances included layers of strong lead and rhythm guitar work melding with "tough yet flexible" bass, in the service of songs ranging from "sparkly jangle" to "sweet but aggressive" hard-rocking power pop.

== Track listing ==
All tracks are written by Doug Gillard.

| No. | Title | Length |
|---|---|---|
| 1. | "Ready For Death" | 3:40 |
| 2. | "Angel X" | 3:45 |
| 3. | "I Shall Not Want" | 4:23 |
| 4. | "Oh My Little Girl" | 5:05 |
| 5. | "Upper Hand" | 2:18 |
| 6. | "Overseas" | 4:34 |
| 7. | "Come Out And Show Me" | 7:09 |
| 8. | "Your Eyes" | 3:15 |
| 9. | "No Perspective" | 2:58 |
| 10. | "On Target" | 3:27 |
| 11. | "Parade On" | 3:23 |

== Personnel ==
- Sally Crewe - backing vocals (tracks 1,4,6)
- George Duron - drums, percussion (tracks 1,3 to 6, 11)
- Ana Morales Gillard - backing vocals (track 10)
- Doug Gillard - composer, vocals, guitar, bass, keyboards, percussion, backing vocals, mixing, producer
- Travis Harrison - drums (tracks 2,7 to 10), engineer, mixing, recording engineer
- Louie Lino - engineer, mixing, recording engineer
- Jeff Lipton - mastering
- Maria Rice - assistant mastering engineer

== Music video ==
In April 2014, a music video by filmmaker Mike Postalakis was officially released for the album track "Ready for Death."
