= Laughing in the Face of a Dead Man =

EP by Death of Samantha
- Released: September 1, 1986
- Genre: Post-punk
- Label: Homestead
- Producer: Chris Burgess, Death of Samantha

Death of Samantha chronology
| Strungout on Jargon (1986) | Laughing in the Face of a Dead Man (1986) | Where the Women Wear the Glory and the Men Wear the Pants (1988) |

Laughing in the Face of a Dead Man is an EP by the post-punk band Death of Samantha, released September 1, 1986 on Homestead Records.

== Release and reception ==
Professional ratings
Review scores
| Source | Rating |
|---|---|
| AllMusic | 2/5 stars |

Although noting that Death of Samantha's sound remained largely the same, Glenn Kenny of Trouser Press found the EP to be more entertaining and worthwhile when compared to the band's debut.

== Track listing ==
All songs written by John Petkovic, except "Werewolves of London" by LeRoy Marinell, Waddy Wachtel and Warren Zevon.

Side one
| No. | Title | Length |
|---|---|---|
| 1. | "Blood & Shaving Cream" |
| 2. | "Werewolves of London" |

Side two
| No. | Title | Length |
|---|---|---|
| 1. | "The Set Up (of Madame Sosostris)" |
| 2. | "Yellow Fever" |
| 3. | "American Horoscope & The Bad Prescription" |

== Personnel ==
Adapted from the Laughing in the Face of a Dead Man liner notes.

Death of Samantha

- Doug Gillard – guitar
- David James – bass guitar, backing vocals
- John Petkovic – vocals, guitar
- Steve-O – drums

Additional musicians and production

- Chris Burgess – production
- Death of Samantha – production
- Rudolph Vasalino – design
- Steve Wainstead – photography

== Release history ==
| Region | Date | Label | Format | Catalog |
|---|---|---|---|---|
| United States | 1986 | Homestead | LP | HMS 071 |
