= Where the Women Wear the Glory and the Men Wear the Pants =

Studio album by Death of Samantha
- Released: 1988
- Genre: Post-punk
- Length: 41:12
- Label: Homestead
- Producer: Chris Burgess

Death of Samantha chronology
Laughing in the Face of a Dead Man (1986)	Where the Women Wear the Glory and the Men Wear the Pants (1988)	Come All Ye Faithless (1989)

Where the Women Wear the Glory and the Men Wear the Pants is the second studio album by post-punk band Death of Samantha, released in 1988 on Homestead Records.

== Release and reception ==
Professional ratings
Review scores
Source	Rating
AllMusic	4.5/5 stars

Glenn Kenny of Trouser Press praised the album, saying it "rocks out with fire, anger and intelligence"

== Track listing ==
All tracks are written by Death of Samantha, except "Sylvia Plath" by Peter Laughner.

Side one
No.	Title	Length
1.	"Harlequin Tragedy"	5:51
2.	"Good Friday"	3:38
3.	"Sylvia Plath"	3:22
4.	"Lucky Dog (Lost My Pride)"	7:51
5.	"Monkey Face"	3:46
6.	"Savior City"	4:09
7.	"Staring Through It Now"	3:17
8.	"That's All That Matters"	2:55
9.	"Blood Creek"	6:23

== Personnel ==
Adapted from the Where the Women Wear the Glory and the Men Wear the Pants liner notes.

Death of Samantha

- Doug Gillard – guitar, backing vocals, musical arrangement
- John Petkovic – lead vocals
- Steve-O – drums, backing vocal
- Dave Swanson – bass guitar, backing vocal

Additional musicians and production

- Chris Burgess – production, recording
- Death of Samantha – production, percussion
- Tom Fallon – maracas (5)
- Scott Savage – saxophone (6)
- Frank Vale – horns
- Ivan Vuckcevich – piano (1)

== Release history ==
Region	Date	Label	Format	Catalog
United States	1988	Homestead	CD, CS, LP	HMS 121
