= Bambi Kino =

American rock band

- Origin: New York
- Genres: Rock and roll, rhythm and blues, rockabilly, girl group, Merseybeat
- Years active: 2010–present
- Label: Tapete Records
- Spinoff of: Nada Surf; Guided by Voices; Cat Power
- Members: Doug Gillard; Ira Elliot; Mark Rozzo; Erik Paparazzi
- Website: bambi-kino.com

Bambi Kino is a band formed by four members of notable American indie rock groups, including Doug Gillard and Ira Elliot, to play music of the early 1960s for a celebration of the fiftieth anniversary of the first Beatles concerts in Hamburg, Germany. The group debuted in 2010 and continues to perform.

== Musical career ==
Bambi Kino was formed in New York in anticipation of 2010's fiftieth anniversary of the Beatles' first shows in Hamburg. The project was created to cover songs from the formative 1960–1962 pre-celebrity era of The Beatles in Hamburg and at the Cavern Club. "Mark and Ira toured through Hamburg in the band Maplewood the previous year and saw that there was nothing planned anywhere to celebrate the 50th anniversary of the Fabs’ life-changing first run in Germany," Gillard said in 2014. "So they brainstormed and came up with the Bambi Kino concept. Let’s play the covers they played in Hamburg, and in their style, nothing written past 1962." In an interview, Rozzo said, "We very consciously didn’t want to be a tribute band. We wanted to be ourselves, and in doing that we thought we were being truer to The Beatles."

The group's name was taken from the Bambi Kino, a movie theater in the St. Pauli district of Hamburg, described as squalid, where the Beatles lived in cramped storerooms.

The founding members were guitarist Mark Rozzo (Maplewood and Champale), guitarist Doug Gillard (Guided by Voices), drummer Ira Elliot (Nada Surf), and bassist Erik Paparazzi (Cat Power). Gillard had previously been a member of Death of Samantha and Cobra Verde, among other notable bands. While performing in Bambi Kino, Gillard plays a 1967 Gibson ES-330 and a Höfner Verithin. Rozzo plays a 1960 Gibson ES-330.

On August 19, 2010, the band debuted with a series of shows at the Indra Club in Hamburg, where the Beatles first played.

In advance of these shows, a debut single — "Some Other Guy" — was released on Hamburg-based Tapete Records. It was produced by Adam Schlesinger (Fountains of Wayne) and engineered by Eli Janney (Girls Against Boys and The 8G Band). In 2011, Tapete released the group's self-titled debut album. The record was praised by AllMusic's James Allen for its authentically "scrappy Merseybeat style," resulting in an album that "also happens to rock on its own merits."

In September 2010, the European network Arte broadcast a Bambi Kino concert film/documentary, filmed at the Indra.

The group has remained active. Shows are typically three or four sets, emulating the style and duration of Beatles performances in Hamburg. They have frequently been joined by guest performers, including David Johansen, Wally Bryson (the Raspberries), Stuart Bogie (Iron and Wine), comedians Neil Hamburger and Dave Hill, producer Don Fleming, and Beatles historian Mark Lewisohn. In 2015, Bambi Kino played the White House Correspondents Jam, in Washington, DC, with Chuck Leavell, keyboardist for the Rolling Stones and The Allman Brothers Band. They have played frequently in New York, appeared at festivals, and have made trips to the West Coast and Midwest of America, and back to Hamburg (including the Come Together Experience festival, in 2023).

== Discography ==
- "Some Other Guy" b/w "Falling In Love Again" (Tapete Records, 2010) — 7" single
- Bambi Kino (Tapete Records, 2011)
- Superhits of the Seventies (WFMU compilation, 2012)
- "What a Crazy World We're Living In," featuring Mark Lewisohn (Tapete Records, 2023) - streaming single (used for end credits in Lewisohn's film Evolver '62)
- Play On: A Raspberries Tribute (Think Like a Key, 2025)
