= Strungout on Jargon =

Studio album by Death of Samantha
- Released: March 1, 1986
- Recorded: Moonliner Recording, Strongsville, OH
- Genre: Post-punk
- Length: 27:52
- Label: Homestead
- Producer: Death of Samantha

Death of Samantha chronology
Strungout on Jargon (1986)	Laughing in the Face of a Dead Man (1986)

Strungout on Jargon is the debut studio album by post-punk band Death of Samantha, released March 1, 1986 on Homestead Records.

== Release and reception ==
Professional ratings
Review scores
Source	Rating
AllMusic	2/5 stars

Glenn Kenny of Trouser Press felt that Death of Samantha showed promise despite sounding too similar to other alternative groups of the era.

== Track listing ==
All lyrics are written by John Petkovic; all music is composed by John Petkovic, except "Couldn't Forget 'Bout That (One Item)" co-written by Doug Gillard.

Side one
No.	Title	Length
1.	"Coca Cola & Licorice"	3:30
2.	"Simple as That"	3:19
3.	"Bed of Fire"	1:51
4.	"Ham & Eggs 99¢"	2:13
5.	"Conviction"	3:22
Total length:		14:15

Side two
No.	Title	Length
1.	"Grapeland (I'm Getting Sick)"	2:32
2.	"Sexual Dreaming"	2:08
3.	"Turquoise Hand"	2:49
4.	"Couldn't Forget 'Bout That (One Item)"	6:05
Total length:		13:37

== Personnel ==
Adapted from the Strungout on Jargon liner notes.

Death of Samantha

- Doug Gillard – guitar
- David James – bass guitar, piano
- John Petkovic – vocals, guitar, clarinet, design
- Steve-O – drums

Additional musicians and production

- Eruk Barth – saxophone
- Chris Burgess – mixing
- Death of Samantha – production
- Scott Hall – recording
- George Peckham – mastering
- Bob Richey – illustrations
- Steve Wainstead – photography

== Release history ==
Region	Date	Label	Format	Catalog
United States	1986	Homestead	LP	HMS 039
