= Tony Booth =

Tony Booth or Anthony Booth may refer to:

- Tony Booth (actor) (1931–2017), British actor and political campaigner
- Tony Booth (artist) (1933–2017), poster artist for The Beatles
- Tony Booth (musician) (born 1943), American country & western singer
- Tony Booth (boxer) (born 1970), British professional boxer.
- Anthony Clarke Booth (1846–1899), recipient of the Victoria Cross
