= Speak Kindly of Your Volunteer Fire Department =

Studio album by Robert Pollard and Doug Gillard
- Released: December 14, 1999
- Studio: Cro-Magnon Studios (Dayton, Ohio)
- Genre: Indie rock
- Length: 38:04
- Label: Fading Captain Series/Luna
- Producer: Robert Pollard; Doug Gillard

Robert Pollard chronology
Kid Marine (1999)	Speak Kindly of Your Volunteer Fire Department (1999)	Choreographed Man of War (2001)

Doug Gillard chronology
Malamute Jute (1999)	Speak Kindly of Your Volunteer Fire Department (1999)	Creative Process 473 (2003)

Robert Pollard and Doug Gillard chronology
Speak Kindly of Your Volunteer Fire Department	Mist King Urth (2003)

Speak Kindly of Your Volunteer Fire Department is a collaboration album between American indie rock musicians Robert Pollard and Doug Gillard released in 1999. For the album, Gillard recorded instrumental tracks for songs Pollard had written (along with contributing four instrumentals of his own), to which Pollard later added vocals.

The fifth track of the album, 'Do Something Real', appeared as the final soundtrack to Steven Soderbergh's 2002 film Full Frontal.

The two would collaborate again in 2003 under the moniker Lifeguards with the album Mist King Urth; this time, however, Gillard composed all the instrumentals himself, with Pollard adding lyrics and vocals.

== Track listing ==
1. "Frequent Weaver Who Burns" – 2:50
2. "Soul Train College Policeman" – 1:39
3. "Pop Zeus" – 2:28 (Pollard, Gillard)
4. "Slick as Snails" – 4:19
5. "Do Something Real" – 2:55
6. "Port Authority" – 4:05 (Pollard, Gillard)
7. "Soft Smoke" – 0:49
8. "Same Things" – 1:19
9. "And I Don't" (So Now I Do) – 2:10
10. "Tight Globes" – 3:07
11. "I Get Rid of You" – 2:50
12. "Life Is Beautiful" – 2:27
13. "Messiahs" – 2:25 (Pollard, Gillard)
14. "Larger Massachusetts" – 2:53 (Pollard, Gillard)
15. "And My Unit Moves" – 1:41

All songs written by Robert Pollard except where noted.

== Reception ==
Professional ratings
Review scores
Source	Rating
Pitchfork	7.4/10
Allmusic	4.0/5.0 stars

Pitchfork gave the album a 7.4/10.
