= Callin' All Dogs =

Studio album by Bodeco
- Released: March 24, 1995
- Recorded: September – October 1994
- Label: Safe House

Bodeco chronology
Bone, Hair & Hide (1992)	Callin' All Dogs (1995)

Callin' All Dogs is the second album by American rock band Bodeco. Released in 1995, it made a considerable impact on the Louisville music scene, finding a place at #80 on WFPK's "top 1000 best albums ever". Trouser Press asserted that the album reinforced "Bodeco's simple genius by turning up the slop right from the get-go".

== Track listing ==
Unless otherwise noted, all tracks composed by Bodeco.

1. "Crazy Sezy Baby" – 3:32
2. "Nut Fuzz" – 2:51
3. "Long Way Down" – 2:42
4. "High Window" – 3:30
5. "Nights Diamond Fingers" – 3:13
6. "Bright Lights at the End of the Road" – 3:09
7. "Hill and Gully Rider" – 3:10
8. "Shaggy's Crawl" – 1:40
9. "Signed Confession" – 2:39
10. "Lucky 13" – 2:19
11. "Chicken Shifter" – 2:21
12. "La Cucaracha" (traditional) – 1:49
13. "Wicked Mean & Evil" – 2:56
14. "Rock & Roll Till the Cows Come Home" – 5:00

== Personnel ==
=== Performance ===
- Jimmy Brown – bass
- Ricky Feather – guitar, vocals
- Matthew "Wink" O'Bannon – guitar
- Gary Stillwell – organ, conga, maracas
- Brian Burkett – trap kit

=== Production ===
- Bodeco – arranger, art direction
- Jeff Carpenter – engineer
- Robbie Cavolina – art direction
- Doug Easley – Engineer
- Howie Gano – Engineer
- Fred Klein – photography
- David McCain – engineer
- Scott Mullins – engineer
