= Bodeco =

American rock band

- Origin: Louisville, Kentucky
- Genres: Rockabilly; country; roots rock
- Labels: Homestead; Safe House
- Members: Ricky Feather; Jimmy Brown; Gary Stillwell; Gene Wickliffe; Freddie Wethington

Bodeco is an American rock band formed in 1984 in Louisville, Kentucky by guitarist, singer and songwriter Ricky Feather and drummer Brian Burkett. It later grew into a full band, with its most famous line-up featuring Feather, Burkett, guitarist Wink O'Bannon, bassist Jimmy Brown and multi-instrumentalist Gary Stillwell. Only Feather, Brown and Stillwell remain from that version.

Titled after a portmanteau of "Bo Diddley" and zydeco, the quintet typically plays a fast-paced country- and blues-tinged rock and roll. The band has recorded four studio albums, including the November 2009 release of "Soul Boost", and a live album.

Bodeco has had a considerable impact on the Louisville music scene, finding a place at No. 80 on WFPK's "top 1000 albums of all time" and inspiring Trouser Press to dub them "[o]ne of the most underappreciated combos in the early-to-mid-'90s indie roots-rock movement".

== Style ==
Bodeco was classified by Trouser Press as "celebratory party rawk". In 1992, The New York Times described the quintet as "a skunky country-rockabilly outfit", noting in 1993 that "[t]here's nothing quaint, cute or five-and-dime about Bodeco's brand of rockabilly. Greasy as a truck-stop burger and bumpier than a high-speed ride in the back of a pickup, this band of Louisville wild men eschews retro contrivances in favor of gristle, marrow and the occasional backwoods yowl".

== Members ==
- Ricky Feather – vocals, guitar
- Jimmy Brown – bass
- Gary Stillwell – percussion, keyboards
- Gene Wickliffe – drums
- Freddy "Southside" Wethington – guitar

=== Former members ===
- Wink O'Bannon – guitar
- Brian Burkett – drums
- Rick Mason – guitar
- Nick Reifsteck – guitar
- Bill Barney - guitar
- Dave Rapp - guitar

== Discography ==
=== Studio albums ===
- Bone, Hair & Hide (1992)
- Callin' All Dogs (1995)
- Crazy Wild (2003)
- Soul Boost (2009)

=== Singles ===
- High Window (1995)

=== Compilation contributions ===
- Wreck Room, Vol. 3 (1996)
- Sourmash (1998)
