= Tony Booth (artist) =

- Born: Anthony Booth; 22 June 1933; Merseyside, England, UK
- Died: 11 January 2017 (aged 83); Upton, Merseyside, England, UK
- Known for: His artwork for The Beatles, Brian Epstein, The Cavern Club and other Merseybeat artists/promoters
- Website: thebeatlesposters.com

Anthony Booth (22 June 1933 – 11 January 2017) was a British commercial artist best known as the original poster artist for the Beatles and other bands in the Merseybeat era. He was known around Liverpool in the early 1960s as Brian Epstein's "right-hand man".

== Early years ==
Born in 1933, Booth grew up in Moreton and was a wartime schoolboy. In 1948, at the age of 15, he won a scholarship in commercial art and design at the Wallasey School of Art and Crafts in Wallasey, Merseyside. After only 18 months at art school, he was offered his first position in a local commercial art studio which was also a printing, sign-writing and poster-writing company.

== Working for the Beatles and Brian Epstein ==
During the early 1960s Booth worked in Liverpool city centre, near the Cavern Club and next door to the Beatles manager Brian Epstein's office. Booth did a lot of business with Epstein, producing posters, printed leaflets and a wide variety of publicity and display material. Booth produced hand-painted gig posters during the early sixties for many promoters, including Epstein, Sam Leach, Allan Williams and Cavern Club DJ -Bob Wooler.

Booth would hand-paint many of the same poster using one-stroke brushes and liners with oil-based colours, mostly on white machine-glazed 'double-crown' 30"x20" poster paper. If Epstein required a larger number of posters for a specific event, then the original artwork would be sent to a local silk-screen printer for bulk printing and distribution and the same artwork was often used for leaflets and press adverts.

Very few of Booth's 1960s original posters have survived, as the posters would normally be disposed of after the event or destroyed during the silk-screen printing process, but today at auction, the printed posters that have survived are sold to collectors for £6,000 or more. Christie's of London sold one of Booth's original hand-painted Cavern Club posters for £27,500, which was double Christie's valuation.

== The Cavern Club ==
During the late 1950s, before his publicity artwork for the Beatles, Booth hand-painted many posters for the Cavern Club on Mathew Street, Liverpool. When it first opened as a jazz club in 1957, 'The Merseysippi Jazz Band' were the big attraction on opening night, supported by The Wall City Jazz Men. He created posters for the club's opening night. The Cavern Club always had plenty of Booth's posters pasted on the walls outside, when the Beatles and other groups were playing there.

In October 2016, Booth was commissioned to produce the artwork for the Cavern Club's 60th anniversary, and this is now on display inside the club.

== Later work ==
In early 2016, BBC1 aired a short documentary on Booth on its Inside Out TV show.

In August 2016, Booth held an exhibition at the View Two Gallery in Liverpool as part of International Beatleweek Festival 2016. This was the very first time all of Booth's posters had been on display under one roof.

== Death ==
Booth died from cancer on 11 January 2017 in Upton, Merseyside, aged 83.
