= Salem 66 =

American indie rock group

Salem 66 was an American indie-rock group formed in 1982 by Judy Grunwald, Elisabeth Kaplan and Susan Merriam. At the time, a serious almost-all-female rock band was somewhat unusual. Through the band's existence, it added and subtracted members, including Robert Wilson Rodriguez, Stephen Smith, Tim Condon, and Jim Vincent. Salem 66 lasted until 1989 and was an important part of the Boston alternative indie music scene. They recorded and released records on Homestead Records, a label founded by Gerard Cosloy. Their music was described as folk punk, but they could be called jangle pop and a loose association can be made with the Paisley Underground and groups such as R.E.M.

== Discography ==
All recordings except Salt were released by Homestead Records:

- 1984 – Salem 66 – Six-song 12-inch EP
- 1984 – "Across the Sea" b/w "Pony Song" – vinyl 7-inch 45 rpm single
- 1985 – "Love & Truth" b/w "Primavera" – vinyl 7-inch 45 rpm single
- 1985 – A Ripping Spin – vinyl LP
- 1987 – Frequency and Urgency – vinyl LP
- 1988 – Natural Disasters, National Treasures – vinyl LP, CD
- 1990 – Down the Primrose Path – vinyl LP, CD
- 2025 – Salt (Don Giovanni) – vinyl LP, CD

In 1987, Homestead released Your Soul Is Mine, Fork It Over, an 18-song retrospective CD combining selections from all the vinyl-only releases.

== See also ==
- Homestead Records
