= Choreographed Man of War =

Studio album by Robert Pollard, Greg Demos, and Jim Macpherson
- Released: 2001
- Studio: Cro-Magnon Studios (Dayton, Ohio)
- Genre: Indie rock
- Label: Fading Captain Series
- Producer: John Shough

Robert Pollard chronology
Speak Kindly of Your Volunteer Fire Department (1999)	Choreographed Man of War (2001)	Motel of Fools (EP) (2003)

Choreographed Man of War is a collaboration album by American indie rock musicians Robert Pollard, Greg Demos, and Jim Macpherson, all members of Guided by Voices. The album features Pollard (vocals, guitar), Demos (bass), and Macpherson (drums) under the name Robert Pollard and his Soft Rock Renegades, a line from the song "A Big Fan of the Pigpen" from the album Bee Thousand. It is the only album by the trio released under this name.

== Track listing ==
1. "I Drove a Tank" – 2:53
2. "She Saw the Shadow" – 2:11
3. "Edison's Memos" – 4:39
4. "7th Level Shutdown" – 3:19
5. "40 Yards to the Burning Bush" – 2:08
6. "Aerial" – 3:15
7. "Citizen Fighter" – 2:24
8. "Kickboxer Lightning" – 3:35
9. "Bally Hoo" – 3:29
10. "Instrument Beetle" – 7:02

== Personnel ==
=== Musicians ===
- Robert Pollard – vocals, guitar
- Greg Demos – bass guitar, lead guitar
- Jim Macpherson – drums

=== Technical ===
- John Shough – engineering
- Mark Greenwald – photography
- Ed Kinsella – photography
- Nick Kizirnis – layout
- Robert Pollard – cover artwork
