= Motel of Fools =

EP by Robert Pollard
- Released: 2003
- Label: Fading Captain Series/Luna

Robert Pollard chronology
Choreographed Man of War (2001)	Motel of Fools (2003)	Fiction Man (2004)

Motel of Fools is an EP by American indie rock musician Robert Pollard, released in 2003.

== Background ==
In a MAGNET interview Pollard stated the album's concept dates back to the Alien Lanes song "Ex-Supermodel" in which he states "I write music for soundtracks now." Motel of Fools is intended to "appear to be a soundtrack" As Pollard stated "since no one contacts me to do soundtracks, I thought I’d do one on my own." Since making this statement Steven Soderbergh tapped Pollard to do songs for his movies Full Frontal and Bubble.

Pollard had a plot in mind but "didn't have enough songs" to fully flesh it out. Pollard took the "soundtrack" concept as far as making posters for the movie he had in his mind. Listening to the album is supposed to bring the listener into a motel filled with "all of these strange characters and fuck-ups."

== Track listing ==
1. "In the House of Queen Charles Augustus" – 4:41
2. "Captain Black" – 3:00
3. "Red Ink Superman" – 5:29
4. "The Vault of Moons" – 3:53
5. "Saga of the Elk" – 2:56
6. "The Spanish Hammer" – 6:55
7. "Harrison Adams" – 4:59
