= Waving at the Astronauts =

Waving At The Astronauts

Studio album by Lifeguards
- Released: 2011
- Genre: Alternative rock, Indie, Lo-fi
- Label: Ernest Jenning, Serious Business Records

Lifeguards chronology
Mist King Urth (2003)	Waving At The Astronauts (2011)

Professional ratings
Review scores
Source	Rating
Allmusic	4/5 stars

Waving At The Astronauts is an album by Lifeguards, a side project of Robert Pollard and Doug Gillard, released in 2011.

== Track listing ==
All songs written by Robert Pollard and Doug Gillard

1. Paradise Is Not So Bad - 4.46
2. Nobody's Milk - 3.35
3. (Doing The) Math - 4.40
4. Product Head - 3.53
5. You're Gonna Need A Mountain - 5.46
6. Sexless Auto - 3.13
7. Trip The Web - 4.01
8. They Called Him So Much - 3.05
9. Keep It In Orbit - 4.01
10. What Am I? - 4.12

=== Personnel ===
- Robert Pollard - lead vocals
- Doug Gillard - Instruments
