= Mist King Urth =

Studio album by Robert Pollard and Doug Gillard
- Released: March 25, 2003
- Studio: Cro-Magnon Studios (Dayton, Ohio); Harpoon House (Unknown location)
- Genre: Alternative rock; indie rock; lo-fi
- Label: Fading Captain Series
- Producer: Robert Pollard; Doug Gillard

Robert Pollard and Doug Gillard chronology
Speak Kindly of Your Volunteer Fire Department (1999)	Mist King Urth (2003)	Waving At The Astronauts (2011)

Lifeguards chronology
Mist King Urth (2003)	Waving At The Astronauts (2011)

Mist King Urth is the second collaboration album between American indie rock musicians Robert Pollard and Doug Gillard under the name Lifeguards released in 2003.

== Track listing ==
All songs written by Robert Pollard and Doug Gillard, except where noted.

1. Gift Of The Mountain (Doug Gillard)
2. Starts At The River
3. First Of An Early Go-Getter
4. Society Dome
5. Shorter Virgins
6. No Chain Breaking
7. Sea Of Dead (Instrumental) (Doug Gillard)
8. Surgeon Is Complete
9. Then We Agree
10. Fether Herd (Doug Gillard)
11. Red Whips And Miracles

== Personnel ==
=== Musicians ===
- Robert Pollard – lead vocals
- Doug Gillard – guitar, backing vocals, drums, bass guitar

=== Technical ===
- Jeff Graham – mastering
- Robert Pollard – cover artwork
