= Beard of Lightning =

Studio album by Phantom Tollbooth
- Released: 2003
- Genre: Alternative rock, Indie rock, lo-fi
- Length: 42:03
- Label: Off Records

Phantom Tollbooth chronology
Daylight in the Quiet Zone E.P. (1990)	Beard of Lightning (2003)

Professional ratings
Review scores
Source	Rating
AllMusic	4/5 stars

Beard of Lightning is an album by Phantom Tollbooth, released in 2003 with Robert Pollard on lead vocals.

== Track listing ==
No.	Title	Length
1.	"Mascara Snakes"	3:15
2.	"Atom Bomb Professor"	6:01
3.	"Asleep Under Control"	3:04
4.	"Iceland Continuations"	3:41
5.	"A Good Looking Death"	1:57
6.	"The Cafe Interior"	3:42
7.	"Capricorn's Paycheck"	3:06
8.	"Gratification to Concrete"	3:38
9.	"Crocodile to the Crown"	8:02
10.	"Janus Pan"	3:50
11.	"Work Like Bullies"	1:47
Total length:		42:03

=== Personnel ===
- Robert Pollard – vocals
- Dave Rick – guitar
- Gerard Smith – bass
- Jon Coats – drums
