= Ray McFall =

British nightclub owner (1926–2015)

Ray McFall (26 November 1926 – 8 January 2015) was a British businessman and music promoter, who owned The Cavern Club in Liverpool.
