= Le Caveau de la Huchette =

Jazz club in Paris, France

Coordinates: 48°51′10″N 2°20′47″E

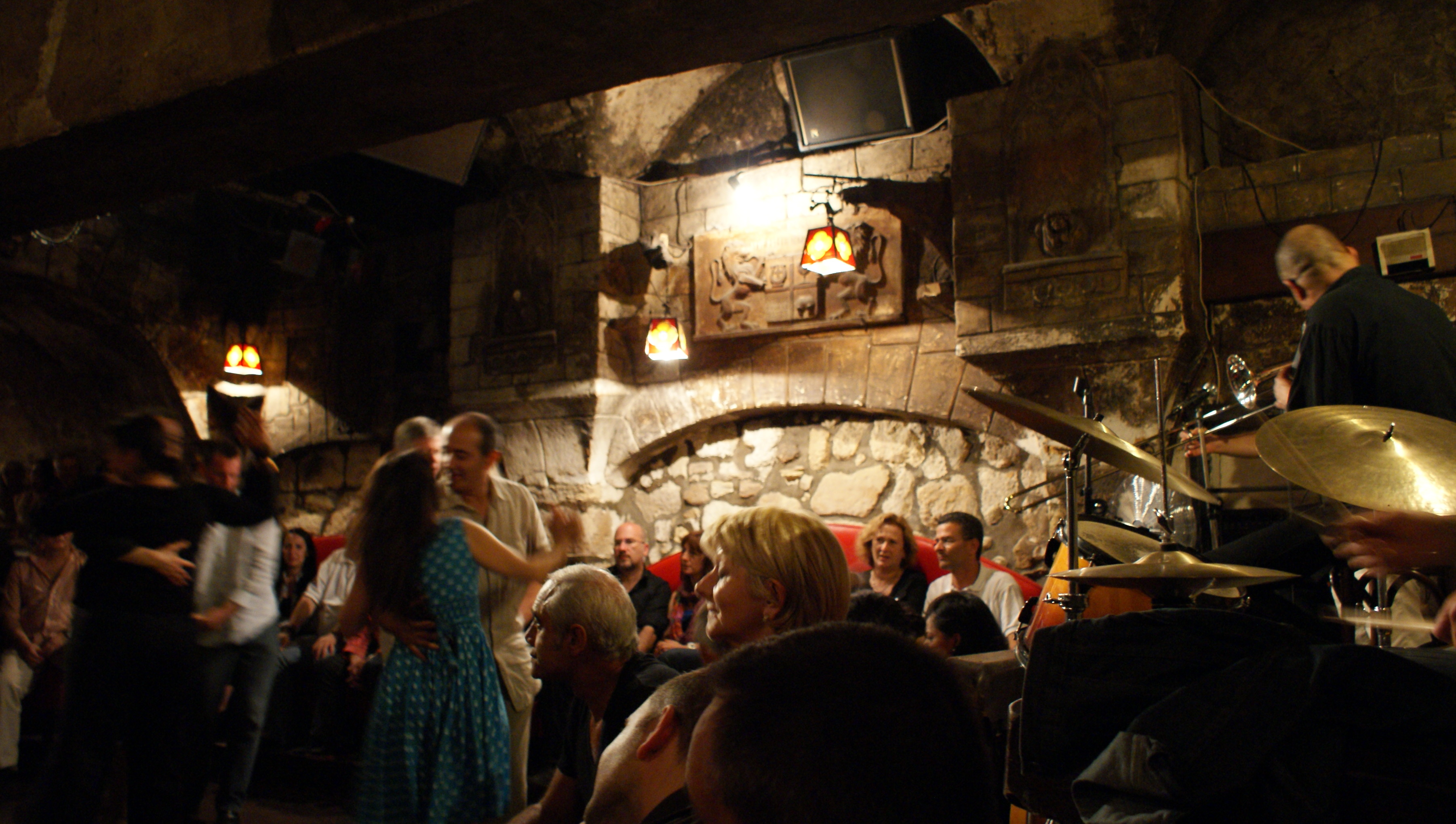
- Inside the Caveau
- Interactive map of Le Caveau de la Huchette
- Location: Paris, France
- Type: Jazz club

Construction
- Opened: 1946

Website
- www.caveaudelahuchette.fr

Le Caveau de la Huchette is a jazz club in the Latin Quarter of Paris. The building dates to the 16th century, but became a jazz club in 1949. The design has been compared to a cellar or labyrinth, and allegedly it was once used by Rosicrucians and by those linked to Freemasonry.

Since becoming a jazz club it has been a venue for American greats like Lionel Hampton, Count Basie, and Art Blakey, as well as leading French jazz musicians like Claude Luter and Claude Bolling. Sidney Bechet and Bill Coleman were American expatriates in France who are also associated with the club.

It was featured in the 1958 film Les Tricheurs by Marcel Carné and Bonjour Tristesse (1958). The club appears briefly in the 2016 film La La Land by Damien Chazelle, and also in other French language films. It is considered an important part of Paris's nightlife in general. At present it is owned by French vibraphonist Dany Doriz.

The club inspired the creation of The Cavern Club, Mathew Street, Liverpool in 1957, where The Beatles performed in their early years. The Cavern was similar inside to Le Caveau with tunnels and thick brick arches.

== See also ==
- List of jazz clubs
