= The Cavern Club =

Music venue in Liverpool, England

Coordinates: 53°24′22″N 2°59′14″W

- The original Cavern Club entrance in 1963
- Interactive map of The Cavern Club
- Location: Mathew Street, Liverpool, England, UK
- Owner: Alan Sytner, Bob Wooler, Ray McFall, Tommy Smith, Bill Heckle, Dave Jones
- Type: Music venue
- Events: Rock 'n' roll, Merseybeat, rock

Construction
- Opened: original 16 January 1957, reopened 23rd July 1966, rebuilt cavern reopened 26 April 1984 and 11 July 1991
- Closed: original! 28th February 1966, 28 May 1973, and rebuilt: 3 December 1989

Website
- www.cavernclub.com

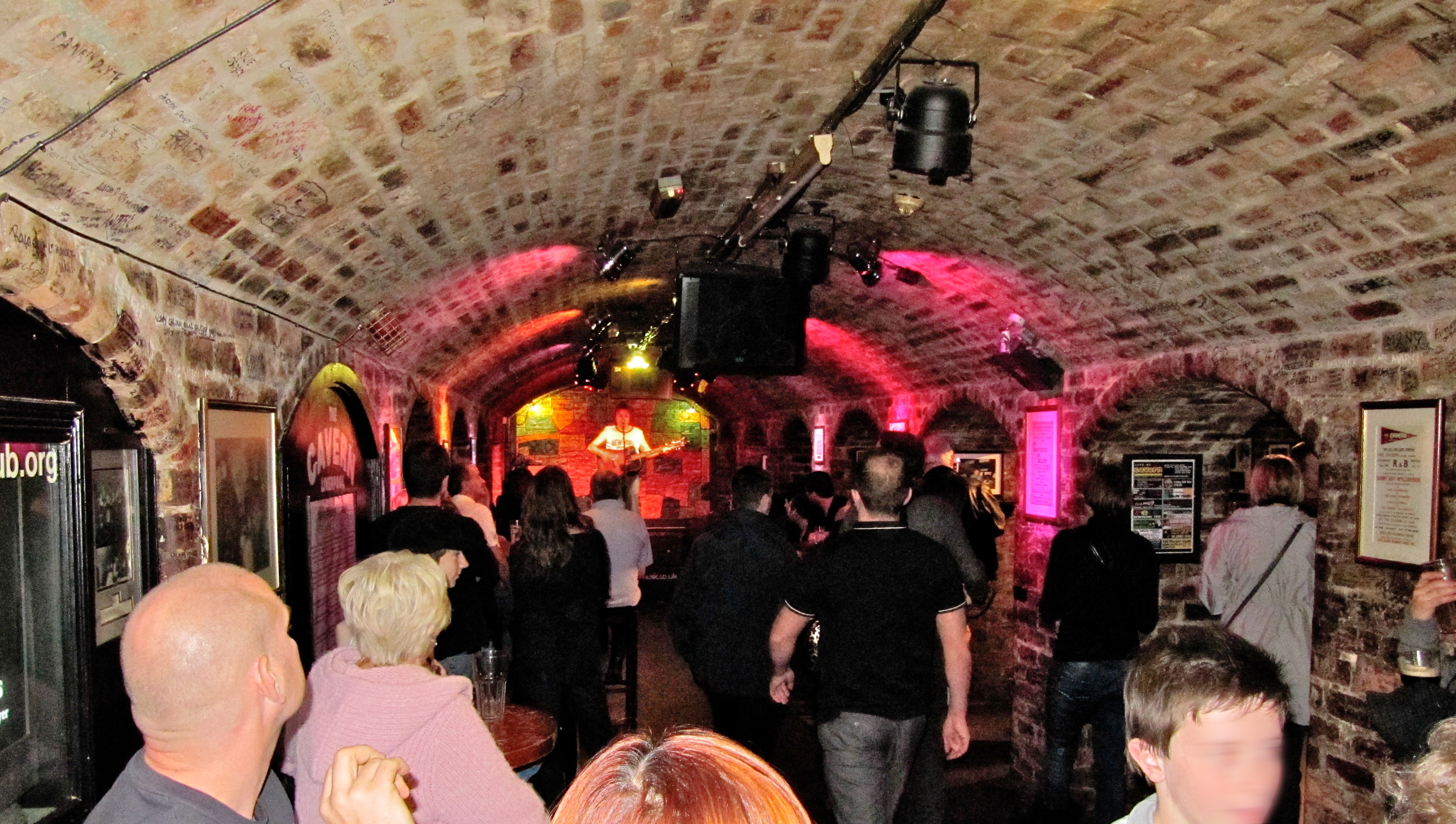
The Cavern of the re-opened Cavern Club (photographed in 2009)

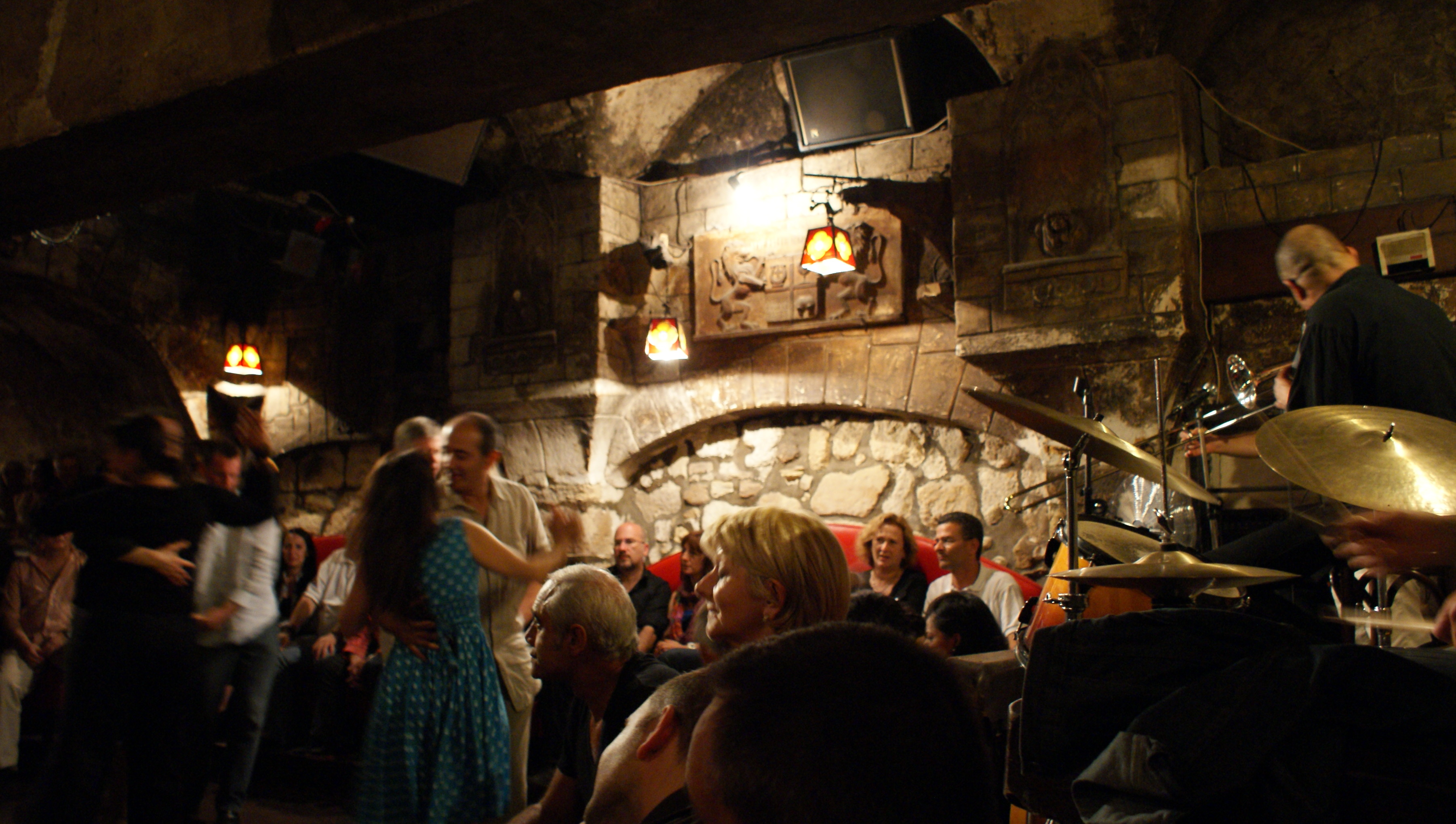
Le Caveau de la Huchette, jazz club in Paris, the model for the Cavern

The Cavern Club is a music venue on Mathew Street, Liverpool, England.

The Cavern Club opened on 16 January 1957 as a jazz club, later becoming a centre of the rock and roll scene in Liverpool in the late 1950s and early 1960s. The club became closely associated with Merseybeat and regularly played host to the Beatles in their early years.

The Cavern Club closed in 1973 and was filled in during construction work on the Merseyrail underground rail loop. It reopened in 1984. It was temporarily closed again from 1989 to 1991, and has been open ever since.

== History of the Cavern Club ==
=== Early history ===
Alan Sytner, having been inspired by the jazz district in Paris where there were a number of clubs in cellars, returned to Liverpool and strove to open a club similar to the Le Caveau de la Huchette jazz club. He eventually found a fruit warehouse where people were leasing the cellar, which had been used as an air raid shelter in World War II. Tropical fruit used to be stored there and during warm months the scent from the ripening fruit was absorbed into the sandstone brickwork. When the club was packed with dancing and smoking teenagers, the heat produced resulted in the bricks sweating and the sweet fruit odour was absorbed into their clothing. After leaving, fans at bus stops could be identified as having visited the club by the pleasant 'Cavern Perfume' on their clothes.

The club opened on 16 January 1957 and the first act to perform there was the Merseysippi Jazz Band. Local commercial artist Tony Booth created the poster artwork for the opening night. He later became the original poster artist for the Beatles.

What started as a jazz club eventually became a hangout for skiffle groups. Whilst playing golf with Sytner's father, Dr. Joseph Sytner, Nigel Walley – who had left school at 15 to become an apprentice golf professional at the Lee Park Golf Club – asked Dr. Sytner if his son could book the Quarrymen at The Cavern, which was one of three jazz clubs he managed. Dr. Sytner suggested that the band should play at the golf club first, so as to assess their talent. Sytner phoned Walley a week later and offered the band an interlude spot playing skiffle between the performances of two jazz bands on Wednesday, 7 August 1957.

Before the performance, the Quarrymen argued amongst themselves about the set list, as rock 'n roll songs were definitely not allowed at the club but skiffle was tolerated. After opening with a skiffle song, John Lennon called for the others to start playing an Elvis Presley song, "Don't Be Cruel". Rod Davis warned Lennon that the audience would "eat you alive", but Lennon ignored this and started playing the song himself, forcing the others to join in. Halfway through, Sytner pushed his way through the audience and handed Lennon a note which read, "Cut out the bloody rock 'n roll". Paul McCartney's first appearance at The Cavern was with the Quarrymen on 24 January 1958. George Harrison first played at the Cavern during a lunchtime session on 9 February 1961.

Sytner sold the Cavern Club to Ray McFall in 1959 and moved to London. Blues bands and beat groups began to appear at the club on a regular basis in the early 1960s. The first Beat Night was held on 25 May 1960 and featured a performance by Rory Storm and the Hurricanes (which included Ringo Starr as drummer). By early 1961, Bob Wooler had become the full-time compère and organiser of the lunchtime sessions.

The club hosted its first performance by the Beatles on Thursday, 9 February 1961. Brian Epstein, the Beatles manager who secured the group's first recording contract, first saw the group perform at the club on 9 November 1961. Inspired by the group, Epstein made moves to take over their management.

=== The Beatles and others ===
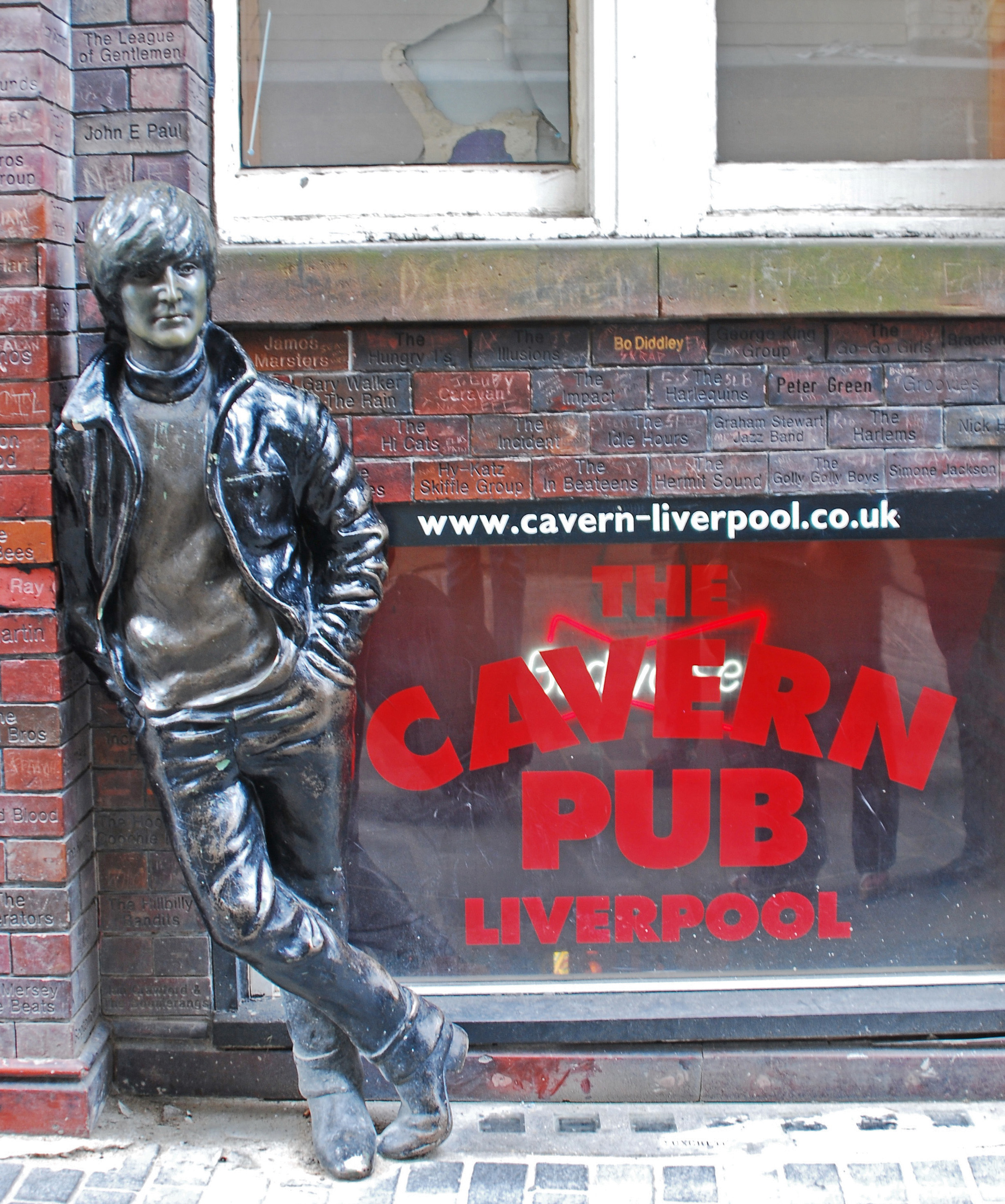
The sculpture of John Lennon outside The Cavern Pub, opposite the Cavern Club, was unveiled on 16 January 1997.

The Beatles made their first appearance at the club on 9 February 1961 after returning to Liverpool from Hamburg, Germany, where they had been playing at the Indra and the Kaiserkeller clubs. Their stage show had been through a lot of changes, with some in the audience thinking they were watching a German band, as they were billed from Hamburg. From 1961 to 1963, the Beatles made 292 appearances at the club, with their last occurring on 3 August 1963, a month after the band recorded "She Loves You" and just six months before the Beatles' first trip to the U.S. By this time "Beatlemania" was sprouting across England, and with girls demanding to see the Beatles and screaming just to get a glimpse of them, the group had to hide or sneak into concerts, and the small club could no longer satisfy audience demand. After the Beatles' farewell gig on 3 August 1963, Bob Wooler gave their future dates to the Mastersounds, a local R&B band, led by Mal Jefferson. The Beatles had graduated from the club and had been signed to EMI's Parlophone label by producer George Martin. The amount of musical activity in Liverpool and Manchester caused record producers who had previously never ventured very far from London to start looking to the north.

In 1963, young local band the Hideaways were signed up to the newly founded Cavern Club agency and became the resident group, often stepping in for last-minute artist cancellations; they also became the first pop group to appear on a nationwide television commercial for Timex Watch Company filmed by the Rank Organisation at the Cavern Club. The band also performed at the Cavern the night prior to the club's closure, making them the last group to perform on stage along with disc jockey Billy Butler and doorman Paddy Delaney, who—with fans—barricaded themselves into the club prior to the authorities' arrival the next morning to gain access. The Hideaways were also proactive along with local MP Bessie Braddock to reopen the Cavern; as a result they were the first group back on stage when the club re-opened on 23 July 1966 with local MP Bessie Braddock and then-Prime Minister Harold Wilson. The Hideaways also hold the official record of over 400 Cavern Club appearances at both old and new venues and are now recognised and named on the wall of fame.

Current townscape of the former warehouse site where the original Cavern Club was located
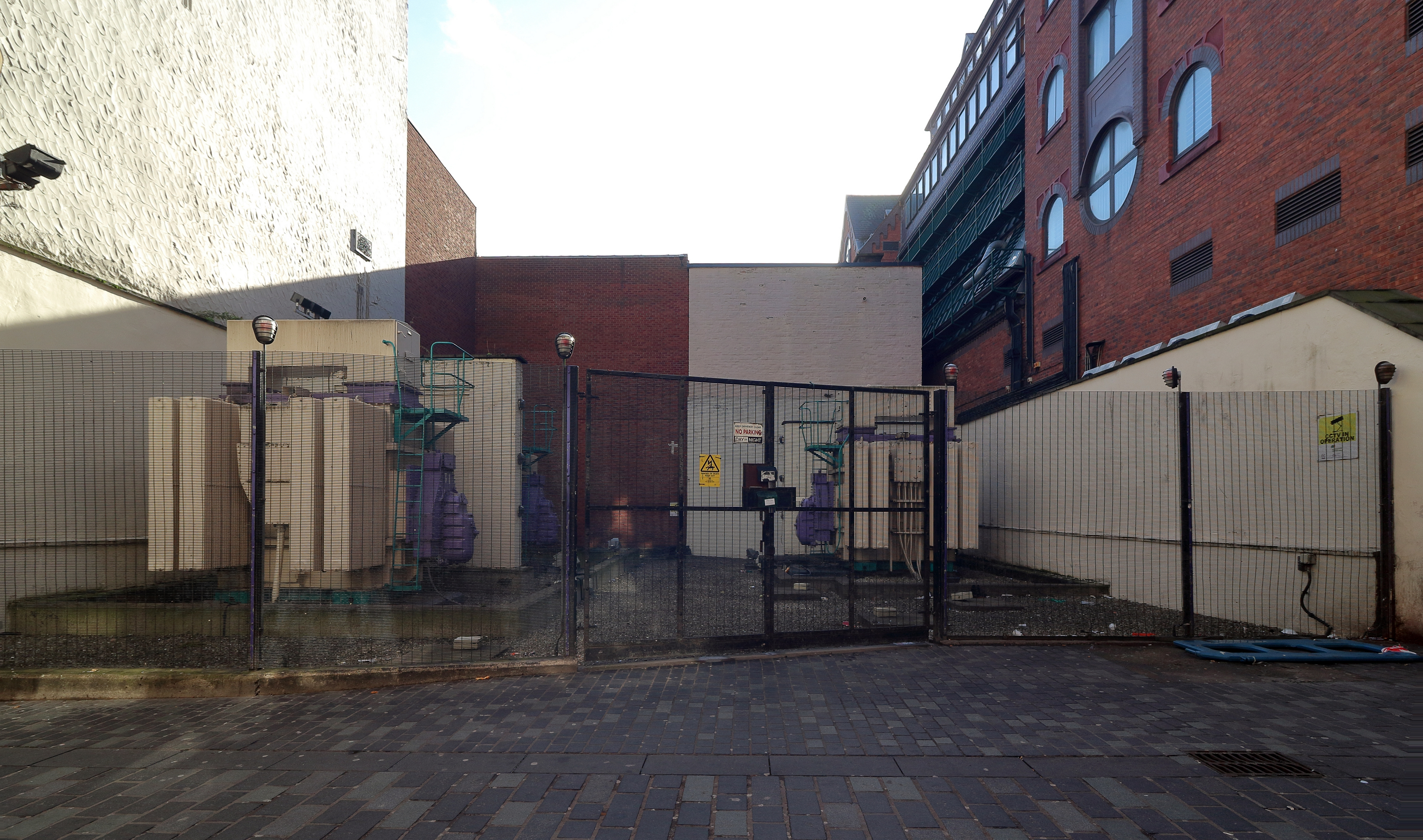
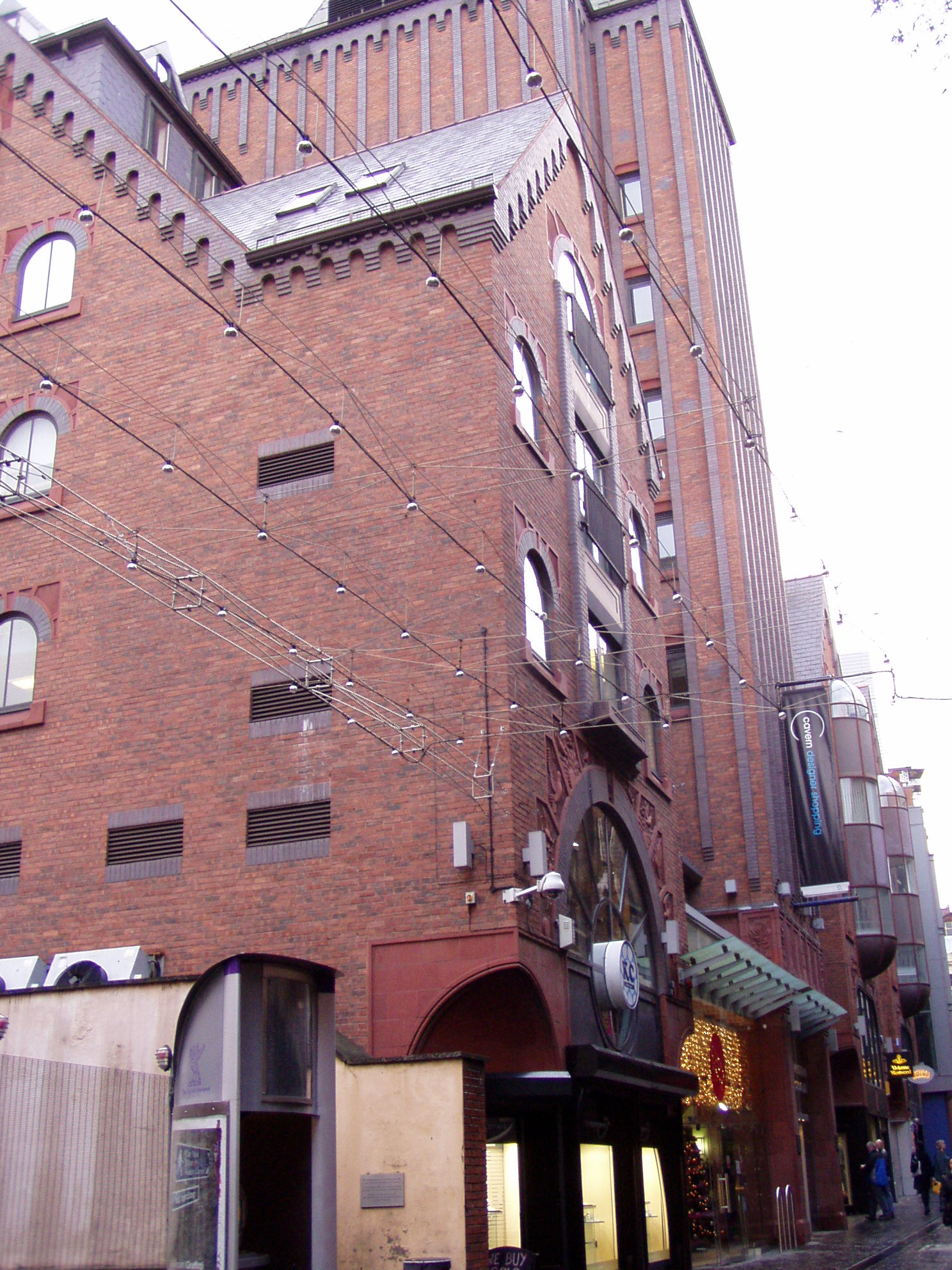
North: Manweb substation was built and was transformed into public art in 1998.
South: The Cavern Walks Boutique Shopping Centre was built in 1984 and the current Cavern Club was opened in it.

In the decade that followed, a wide variety of popular acts appeared at the club, including the Rolling Stones, the Yardbirds, the Hollies, the Kinks, Elton John, Black Sabbath, Queen, the Who and John Lee Hooker.

The song "I Know a Place", a hit for Petula Clark in 1965, twice refers to the club as "a cellar full of noise".

Brian Epstein's 1964 autobiography was entitled A Cellarful of Noise.

Future singing star Cilla Black worked as the hat-check girl there.

=== Closing and today ===
One of the last groups to play at the club was Focus, with Jan Akkerman, Thijs van Leer, Pierre van der Linden and Bert Ruiter. The club closed on 28 May 1973 after British Rail made a compulsory purchase of the warehouses, the basement of which housed the Cavern Club, in order to build a ventilation shaft for the new Merseyrail underground railway. That was never built, however, and the area was turned into a car park.

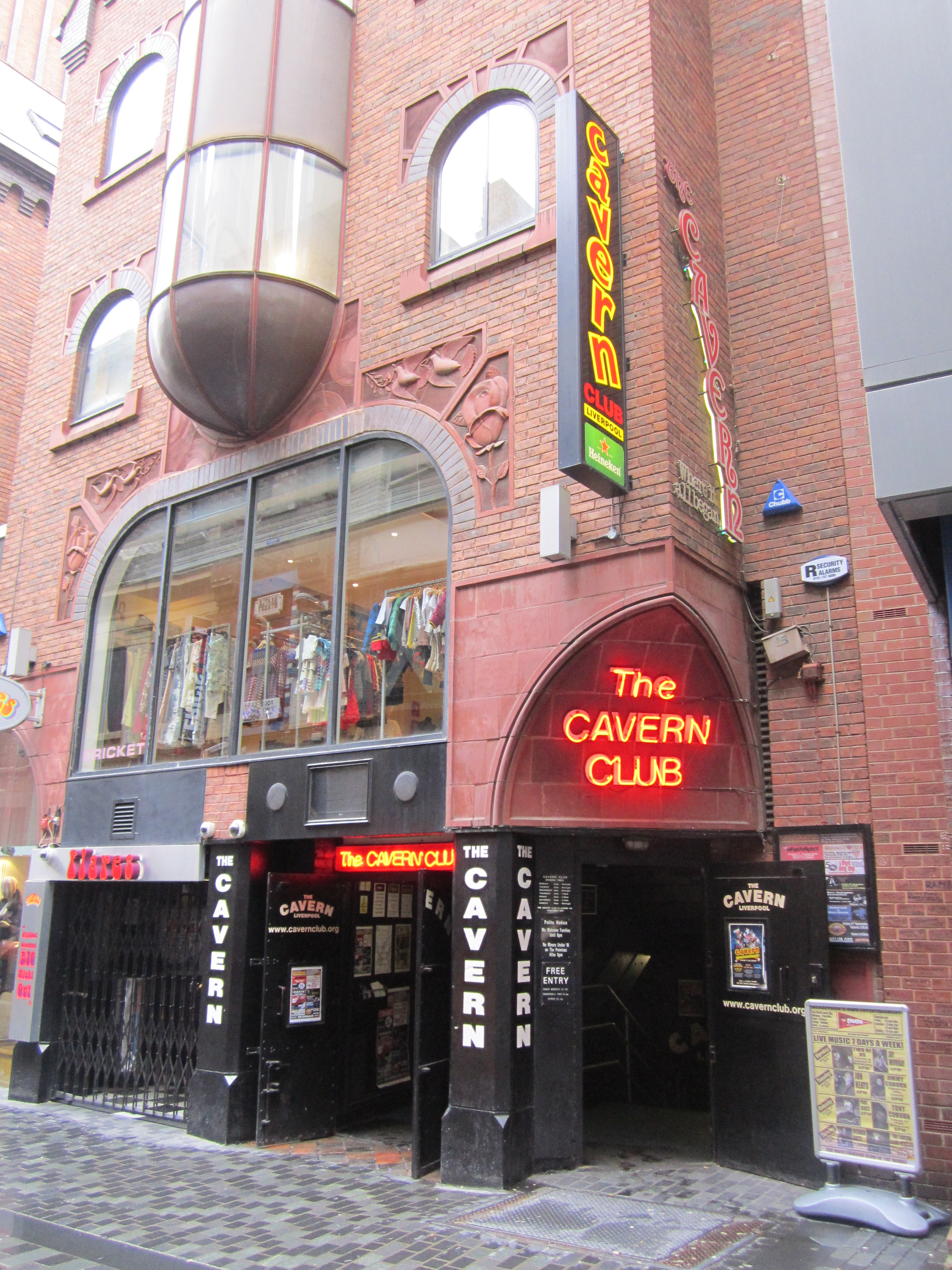
External view of the reopened Cavern Club, October 2012

Soon after the Cavern club closed in 1973, a new Cavern club opened at 7 Mathew Street, later renamed the Revolution Club. This club would later shut down and be reopened as Eric's, which itself became a notable local music venue in the late 1970s.

On 7 December 1981 plans were revealed to excavate the buried remains of the Cavern Club cellar. It would form part of a £7 million redevelopment project of the former warehouse site of 8–12 Mathew Street which had housed the Cavern Club up until its closure in 1973. However, on 23 June 1982, it was announced by the project architect, David Backhouse, that the plans to excavate and re-open the Cavern Club in its original form would be impossible for structural reasons. Tests had revealed that the arches of the old cellar had been too badly damaged during the demolition of the ground floor of the Cavern Club and the warehouses above.

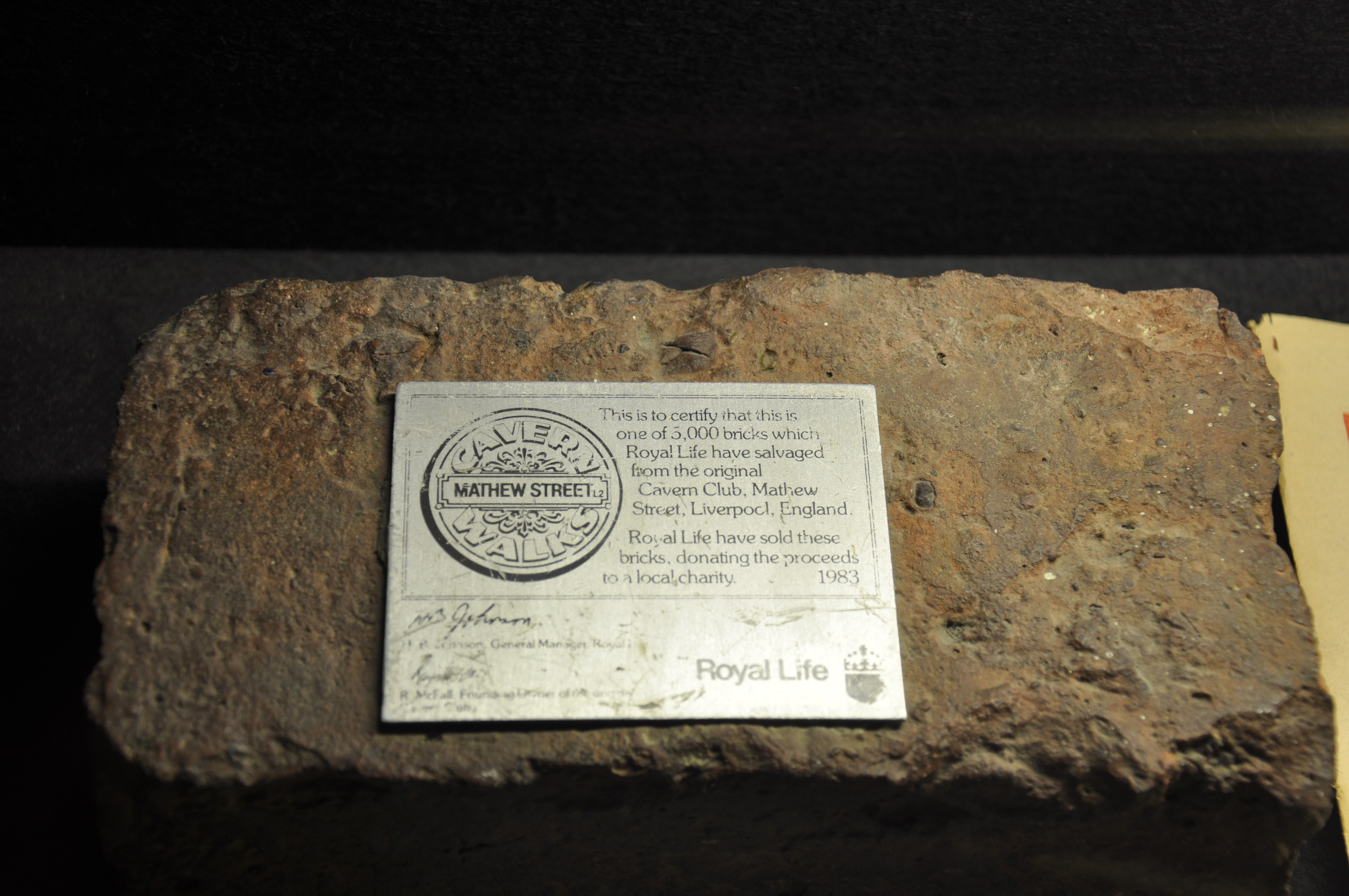
Cavern Club original bricks, one of 5,000, salvaged by Royal Life in 1983

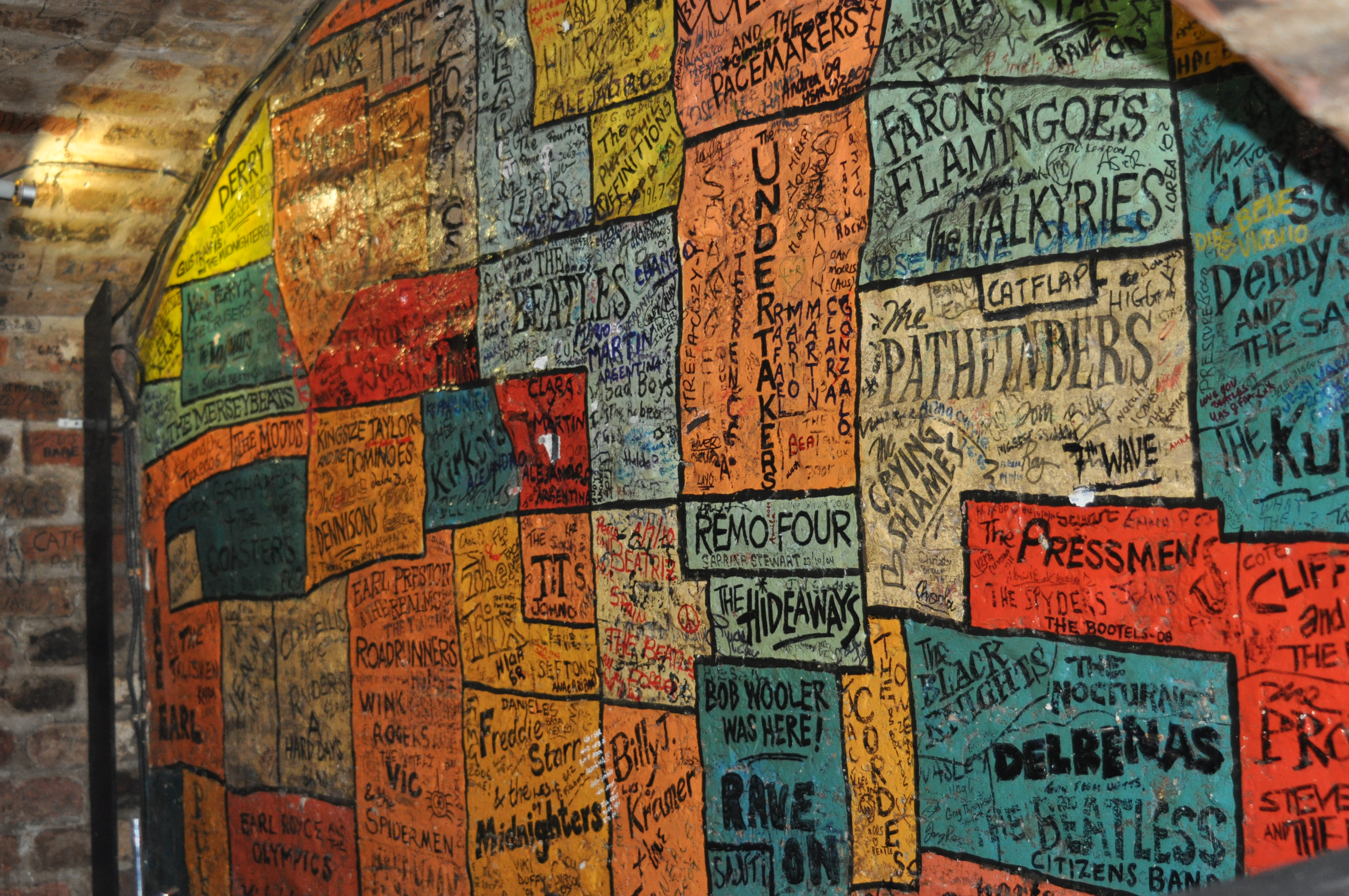
Signed wall at the back of the Cavern's stage

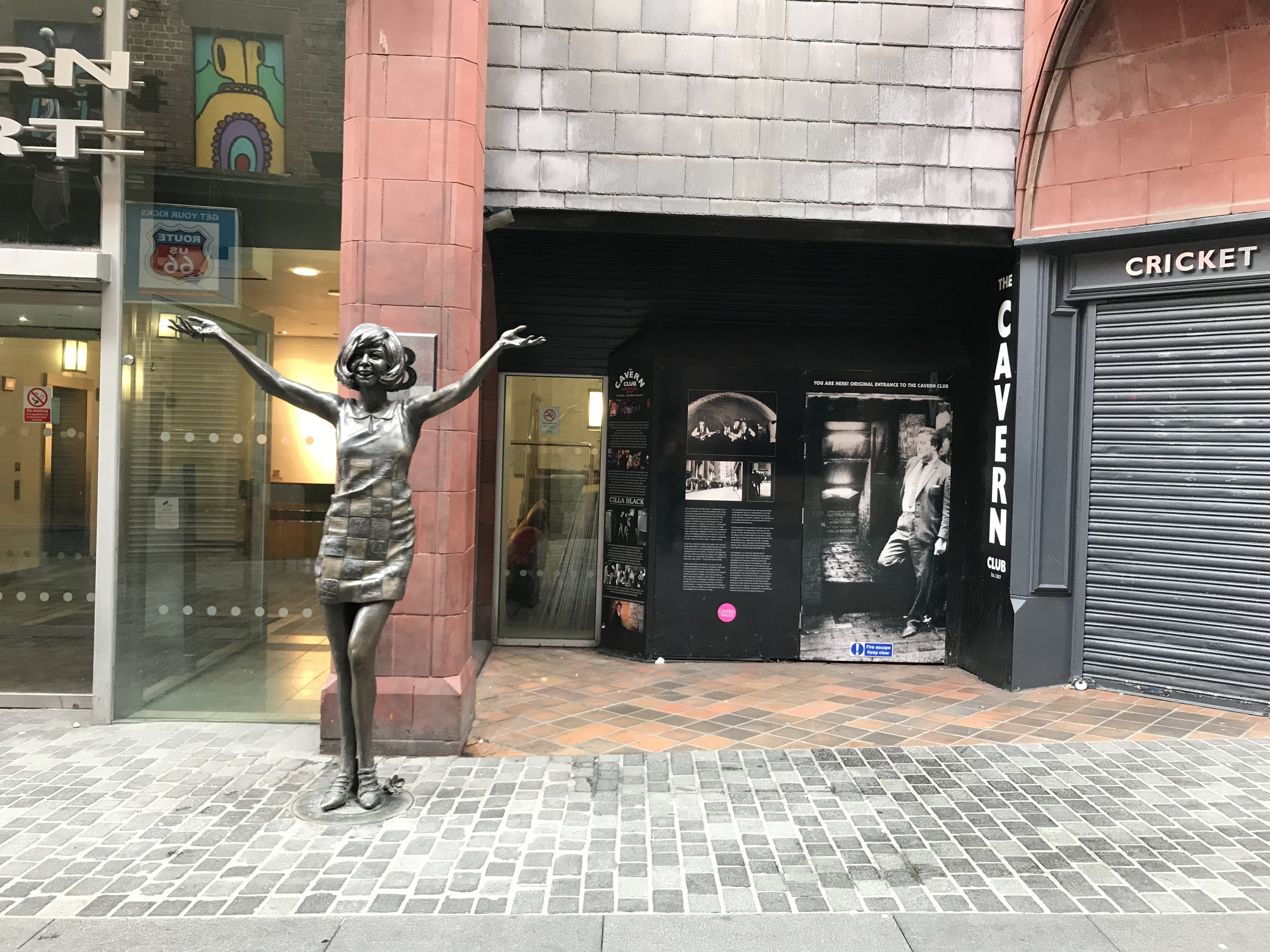
Location of the original entrance, next to the Cilla Black statue

5,000 bricks from the damaged archways of the original cellar area of the Cavern Club went on sale at £5 each, complete with an authentication plate signed by former Cavern Club owner Ray McFall. Proceeds from the sale of the 5,000 bricks went to Strawberry Field Children's home.

Before the Cavern Club's opening ceremony, over 100 musicians from the 1960s Mersey Beat era were invited to sign the wall at the back of the Cavern's stage, a tradition which began in the early days of the Jazz bands in the 1950s and continued through the 1960s and 1970s. A further 15,000 bricks from the Cavern site were used on the authentic reconstruction of the Cavern Club within the redevelopment.

The Cavern Club now sits at a 90-degree angle to the original and covers 70% of the original Cavern footprint, the stage is not far from the original location, and the 'Live Lounge' is an exact replica of the original, using as many of the old bricks as possible.

The fire exit, next to the Cilla Black statue, is the location of the original entrance.

The club was taken over by former Liverpool Football Club player Tommy Smith. The new design was to resemble the original as closely as possible. This coincided with a period of massive economic and political change in and around Liverpool and the club survived only until December 1989, when, following a serious assault on a customer which led to jail sentences for the owners, the Cavern Club lost its licence and was closed by the Licensing Authority. In 1991, two friends—schoolteacher Bill Heckle and taxi driver Dave Jones—reopened it, along with George Guinness on 11 July 1991. They still run the club today and are now the longest-running owners in its history. The club continues to function primarily as a live music venue. The music policy varies from the 1960s, 1970s, 1980s and 1990s classic pop music to indie, rock and modern chart music.

On 14 December 1999, former Beatle Paul McCartney played the New Cavern Club, publicising his new album, Run Devil Run. It has about 40 live bands performing every week; both tribute and original bands, although most perform their own material. The back room of the Cavern is the most frequently used location for touring acts and ticketed events, in more recent times playing host to the Wanted, Adele and Jessie J. The Cavern is also used as a tour warm-up venue with semi-secret gigs announced at the last moment. The Arctic Monkeys did this in October 2005, Jake Bugg in November 2013, as well as Travis and Oasis.

The front room is the main tourist attraction, where people come to have their photograph taken on the stage, with the names of the bands who played there written on the back wall. This room hosts live music from noon to midnight Monday to Thursday, and noon to close on Fridays and weekend. Between November 2005 and September 2007, the front room played host to the Cavern Showcase, an organisation and event started by 1960s star Kingsize Taylor, his wife Marga, and best friend Wes Paul. The night took place every Sunday and featured original 1960s bands such as the Mojos and the Undertakers.

In November 2008, a campaign to have Gary Glitter's brick removed from the wall of fame was successful. A brass plaque near where it was located notes that the bricks of two former Cavern Club performers—Glitter and Jonathan King—have been removed.

In 2017, the Cavern commissioned Tony Booth, the artist who designed all the original posters and signage for the original club, to produce 60th anniversary artwork which portrays bands and musicians who performed there. Also in 2017, a statue of Cilla Black commissioned by her sons was unveiled outside the Cavern's original entrance.

In July 2018, McCartney returned to the Cavern Club. During a Facebook Live Q&A session in the Liverpool Institute for Performing Arts (LIPA), he hinted that he would perform a secret gig the following day. McCartney was expected to play only a 45-minute set, but performed for two hours. He opened the show saying "Liverpool! Cavern! These are words that go together well!" and then played a mixed set featuring songs from his upcoming album, Egypt Station.

== Tributes ==
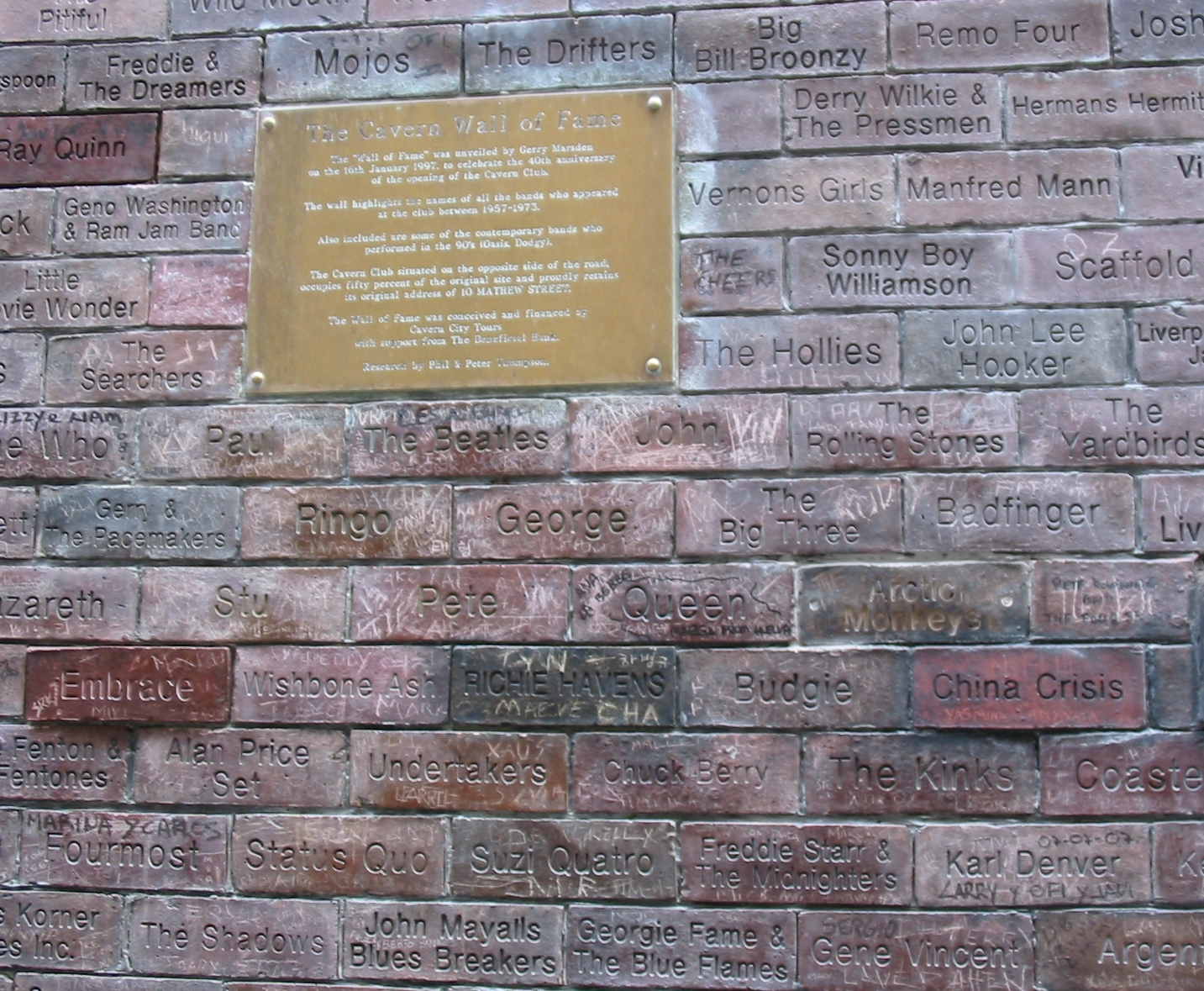
The Cavern Wall of Fame, surrounding the Cavern Pub, opposite the Cavern Club

Tribute clubs exist in Buenos Aires, Wellington, Exeter, Costa Teguise in Lanzarote, and formerly in Dallas, Tokyo and Adelaide. A similar looking club was also featured in the opening sequence of the 2007 film Across the Universe, in homage to the Beatles' beginnings, though the club's name was never mentioned. The footage for this scene was actually shot in the Cavern Club itself. The Cavern Club is the first playable location in the 2009 rhythm game The Beatles: Rock Band.

The Hard Rock Cafe restaurant and hotel chain owns the trademark to the "Cavern Club" name in the US. When the Hard Rock Cafe was built in Boston in 1991, it included a brick Cavern Club cellar that was a reproduction of the Liverpool club, including a stage for local bands. In 2006, the Boston restaurant moved to a new location, and although the new restaurant still has a "Cavern Club" performing area, it bears no resemblance to the Liverpool cellar. In 2014, a lawsuit was filed to revoke Hard Rock's trademark on the Cavern Club name.

It also had a cameo in two John Lennon biopics, 2000's In His Life: The John Lennon Story and 2009's Nowhere Boy, as well as the movie Across the Universe.

Roger McGough mentioned the club in his poem Let Me Die a Youngman's Death: "Or when I'm 104 / and banned from the Cavern / may my mistress / catching me in bed with her daughter / and fearing for her son / cut me up into little pieces and throw away every piece but one."

Norwegian Cruise Lines have Cavern Clubs on four of their liners, the Norwegian Bliss, Norwegian Joy, Norwegian Encore, and the Norwegian Epic, which showcase Beatles tribute bands.

== See also ==
- Cavern Mecca, a museum that was next to the Cavern Club
- Iron Door Club
- List of the Beatles' live performances
