= Bob Wooler =

Background information
- Born: Frederick James Wooler; 19 January 1926; Liverpool, England
- Died: 8 February 2002 (aged 76) Liverpool, England
- Occupation: DJ

Frederick James "Bob" Wooler (19 January 1926 – 8 February 2002) was an English compère and DJ at The Cavern Club, Liverpool from 1961 until 1967. An important figure in the Merseybeat scene, Wooler was instrumental in introducing the Beatles to their manager, Brian Epstein. In later years, Wooler staged annual Beatles conventions in Liverpool with one-time Beatles manager Allan Williams.

== Career ==
While he was living in Garston, he became involved in managing a skiffle group called the Kingstrums. He entered them into a talent contest at the Gateacre Labour Club. The competition was won by a group called the Mars Bars, who later became Gerry & the Pacemakers. The Kingstrums disbanded in 1958, but his experience of the music scene convinced Wooler that he was more suited to being a compère for the shows put on at local jive hives. As a compère/disc jockey he worked, part-time, for promoters such as Wally Hill of Peak Promotions.

Wooler's encyclopaedic knowledge of the local scene soon made him a sought-after figure by promoters and his advice was regularly heeded. Allan Williams offered him a job at the Top Ten Club, but it burned down shortly after opening. Always of smart attire, Wooler then started full-time employment, in his most notable role, as compère at the Cavern Club. Whilst Williams was sorting out his finances, due to his former club burning down, he recommended that Wooler become the Beatles' manager, an offer that he declined. Wooler himself was subsequently instrumental in introducing the Beatles to their future manager, Brian Epstein. His voice was captured on a live EP by the Big Three at the Cavern, saying "We've got the hi-fi high & the lights down low, so here we go, with the Big Three Show!" Wooler became one of the major figures on the Mersey Scene and did much to help the various groups, remaining at the Cavern until 1967. - Famously, Wooler was physically attacked by John Lennon after his visit to Spain with Brian Epstein at Paul McCartney's 21st birthday party in Paul's Aunty Jin's (or Gin's' - short for Virginia's) house in Dinas Lane. Wooler (then 37) reportedly required urgent medical attention after the attack by Lennon (then 22). Possible legal or criminal action against Lennon was avoided by a significant payment to Wooler. Despite the incident, relations between the Beatles organization and Wooler remained cordial enough that Wooler continued to participate in Beatles events in and around Liverpool with the apparent approval of Lennon and Epstein.

Wooler is given credit for creating and being the first to print the familiar Beatles first-name order of John, Paul, George, and Ringo.

In later years, Wooler and Allan Williams staged annual Beatles conventions in Liverpool. Wooler suffered a stroke in the 1980s and died at the Royal Liverpool Hospital on 8 February 2002 following a long illness.

== Woolerisms ==
Wooler's aphorisms are known as Woolerisms.

- "Hi, all you Cavern dwellers; welcome to the BEST of cellars", referring to the cellar in which the original Cavern Club was situated.
- "The Nemperor" for Epstein, was an amalgamation of NEMS, Epstein's record shop in Liverpool, and 'emperor'.
- Others include; "Mr. Showmanship" for Rory Storm, "The Panda-footed Prince of Prance" for Faron, leader of Faron's Flamingos, "The Sheik of Shake" for Karl Terry, of Karl Terry and the Cruisers, and "The Boswell of Beat" for Bill Harry, editor of Mersey Beat.
