= Death of Samantha =

American post-punk band

Background information
- Origin: Cleveland, Ohio, U.S.
- Genre: Post-punk
- Years active: 1984–1990, 1992, 2011–2013, 2018
- Label: Homestead
- Members: Doug Gillard; David James; John Petkovic; Steve-O
- Past members: Marky Ray; Dave Swanson
- Website: deathofsamantha.com

Death of Samantha is an American rock band from Cleveland, Ohio, United States. Founded in 1983, the quartet debuted at a Ground Round family restaurant in Parma Heights. Death of Samantha played a farewell show on December 15, 1990, but later regrouped on December 23, 2012, with its original four-piece lineup: vocalist/guitarist John Petkovic, lead guitarist Doug Gillard, bassist David James and drummer Steven "Steve-O" Eierdam.

The band was signed by Gerard Cosloy to the New York-based Homestead Records. The band performed with contemporaries such as Sonic Youth, along with Nirvana, Jesus and Mary Chain, the Replacements, Smashing Pumpkins, the Gun Club, Leaving Trains and Redd Kross. Death of Samantha released three albums and an EP on Homestead from 1986 to 1990. Prior to signing, they released two critically acclaimed singles on local Ohio label St. Valentine Records.

== History ==
=== Formation and early history: 1983-1985 ===
Originally, the band was a trio, with Petkovic on guitar, James on bass and Steve-o on drums. At the time, all three were living in Parma, a working-class suburb of Cleveland. James and Steve-o were co-founders of hardcore punk fanzine Negative Print. James, 15, and Petkovic, 17, at the time, met at Valley Forge High School in Parma Heights.

Death of Samantha performed its first show on August 24, 1983, at a Ground Round family-style restaurant in Parma Heights. They took their name from a 1973 Yoko Ono song, "Death of Samantha", the night before their debut. The band scored its inauspicious debut because Petkovic worked as a janitor at the restaurant. "We did that show on chicken-wing night, and it was really noisy and awful" said Petkovic, in an interview with the Cleveland Plain Dealer. "People were throwing wings at one another, and other people walked out because they thought it was horrible." He ended up getting fired, but the show became part of punk rock legend, as rumor spread via punk fanzines about this rebellious band that caused a mini riot at a family restaurant.

DOS played its first club show at the Lakefront in downtown Cleveland on January 14, 1984. It played its first show as a quartet with Doug Gillard on lead guitar on May 20, 1984, at the Pop Shop, an underground music club located in the basement of the famed Cleveland Agora. Gillard and Petkovic met, by chance, at an area amusement park.

The four-piece lineup proceeded to release two singles on St. Valentine Records, a local cooperative label formed to document Cleveland's non-hardcore underground.

The band's first 7", "Amphetamine", released on Valentine's Day 1985, quickly sold out of its 1000-copy pressing thanks to critical acclaim in a number of magazines. The band's follow-up single, "Coca Cola and Licorice" (or as it was also called, Porn in the U.S.A.), cemented their status as a rising darling in the underground scene. Featuring an ominous bass groove, brash guitars and noisy clarinets, not to mention liner notes by writer and early DOS supporter Byron Coley, it received rave reviews around the country. The single immediately sold out and Petkovic sold his guitar to print up a second pressing, and for months he borrowed guitars to play, record and tour.

=== Homestead Records era: 1986-1990 ===
The singles landed the band a record contract with Homestead Records; "Coca Cola and Licorice" would be the opening track for the band's debut album, Strungout on Jargon. Released in February 1986, the nine-song album features a cover photo taken in front of the former Leader Drug store in Parma, depicting the quartet and an unidentified fifth person who was walking into the store. Strungout on Jargon became an unlikely breakthrough for Homestead Records, in part because it didn't fit in anywhere in particular in the indie scene. Hailed in the Village Voice, Forced Exposure, Sounds, NME and Creem Magazine, the band also found itself featured in teen rock magazines such as Star Hits.

Creem wrote: "This foursome is merely the most substantial contraction of the trumpeted CLE-vival scene that birthed Pere Ubu and the mighty Pagans. Like that pair, DOS leap outta some aural vacuum with nary a root exposed, but with plenty of bare wires to trip up the unsuspecting. Need a single touchstone? The truly surreal "Coca Cola and Licorice" could successfully play hide 'n' seek on Trout Mask Replica, but the Cap'n isn't the object of any idle worship. Singer John Petkovic testifies in an addled shout that combines the better halves of Tom Waits and Ian Curtis without the caricatured styling of either".

In 1987, Death of Samantha released a follow-up EP, Laughing in the Face of a Dead Man. The cover featured a naked mannequin watching television in an empty lot with the Cleveland skyline in the background, with a baby mask staring into the camera. Like the cover photo, the music of Laughing... has a pastiche quality, with sound effects and pieces of songs assembled and peppered throughout the EP. The pastiche approach influenced Robert Pollard of Guided by Voices, who displayed the record in a photo shoot for a 2008 story in Spin.

Pollard later wrote, in the liner notes to Death of Samantha album If Memory Serves Us Well: "I got into their sense of humor, the snippets, samples, titles and album covers. The fact that they had put out all their albums on Homestead. The way they dressed. Their employment of television and movie culture. The whole package. Plus, they flat out could write songs and play."

By 1987, James had left the band and was replaced by Dave Swanson (who played in fellow St. Valentine and then Homestead recording act the Reactions). This lineup recorded and released two additional full-length albums, Where the Women Wear the Glory and the Men Wear the Pants (1988) and Come All Ye Faithless (1990). Both displayed a big leap in recording and production quality. "The late '80s were Death of Samantha's apex", said journalist Byron Coley. "They were popular in Cleveland and around the states, they pulled off some of their most glorious on-stage antics and they released a pair of "mature" albums".

Where the Women..., described by Pollard as "an arena leap forward", concluded with the doom anthem "Blood Creek." The song closed most of the band's sets and would often descend into noise and free-form chaos. Spin described the song: "an epic Berlin-Wall-of-cans groovebuild encompasses the most grungemungous furnace of Asheton/Laughner powerwah-carnage in centuries, almost".

Come All Ye Faithless continued the expanded instrumentation of Where the Women... Rolling Stone remarked that "DOS cooks with a wiry, more refined guitar clamor and Dylanesque lyric attack", while Pulse! remarked on how the album's "contrarily literate songwriting conjures a near Brechtian vision of 20th America. The result is working-class art-rock for disaffected aesthetes. Not surprisingly, the album sticks out like a sore thumb in the current U.S. indie scene". The band welcomed that position, wrote Option: "Death of Samantha is a collective mass of cultural iconography, symbolism as art, caught somewhere between the myths that make legends out of alternative rock bans, all the while bending the rules of the independent rock game. Psycho-revisionists in an underground music scene, Death of Samantha are myth benders, music blenders, mind fuckers and snazzy rock and roll hooligans who aren't so full of themselves to actually want to put on a show".

The band broke up in the fall of 1990.

=== Reunions ===
The band played an early reunion show in Cleveland at the Empire on March 14, 1992.

On December 23, 2011, the original quartet reunited for a one-off show at Cleveland's Beachland Ballroom with This Moment in Black History opening.

On September 8, 2012, the band played another show in Cleveland at Case Western Reserve University.

On July 6, 2013, the band headlined the inaugural 4th & 4th Fest in Columbus, Ohio.

In 2013, the band released the double album (and single CD) If Memory Serves Us Well on St. Valentine, a live, in-the-studio recording of songs spanning the group's career and featuring liner notes by Mark Lanegan, Thurston Moore and Pollard.

In 2018, the band performed at the final concert at the Phantasy Nightclub in Cleveland.

=== Stage Show ===
Death of Samantha's bizarre debut at the Ground Round became part of the band's legend. It also came to be seen as a larger part of a live show that was called, at times, "wild" and "surreal". Wrote Byron Coley: "There were precious few combos birthed in the '80s to whom THE SHOW was the thing. Paramount amongst this anti-hip elite was Cleveland's own Death of Samantha. With Gillard in place as a visual foil and constantly riffing guitar PRESENCE, Petkovic was freed to spurt around the stage like a big pock of metallic jiz in a low-gravity environment. His mouth jammed full of red licorice, his cheap suit soiled by un-named liquids, Petkovic power-oozed like a Vegas lounge singer on Benzedrine, while the band flared around him. Dave James was a nonpresence visually, but his bass had enough bite to get the boys dancing. Doug Gillard tottered on sky-high platform heels, spuzzing out thick chords of raunch and craning his head around as though someone had told him that the Sensational Alex Harvey had just walked into the room. Steve Eierdam (aka Steve-O) pounded the tubs like a big game hunter, and appeared to be something like an unholy cross between Ubu's Crocus Behemoth and The Meatmen's Tesco Vee - gushing philosophy, jokes, magic tricks and an untaggable brand of bad-vibe weirdness, looking all the while like one of his bandmates' tubby uncles in dire need of electroshock treatment. They were popular in Cleveland and around the states, they pulled off some of their most glorious on-stage antics".

"Most punk bands get their start playing some beer-soaked dive in front of people in black leather. We got ours playing next to a popcorn machine, on chicken wing night, in front of a bunch of people in acid-washed jeans," said Petkovic in Eric Davidson's book, We Never Learn: The Gunk Punk Undergut, 1988-2001. According to We Never Learn: "The initial scam at the Ground Round was the first of many subversive pranks Death of Samantha regularly doled out like chicken wings at a suburban family restaurant. An Elvis funeral on stage, clarinet solos, feather boas -- none of it was party to anything increasingly serious alternative musicians were supposed to be doing in the late-80s.

The "funeral show" featured Steve-O popping out of a coffin to the overture from Jesus Christ Superstar in a Cleveland club called the Phantasy. He had been paraded around the club with pallbearers as part of a funeral procession. After he jumped out and onto the stage, fans grabbed feather-filled pillows in the coffins and engaged in a pillow fight, filling the club with feathers, and earning the band a temporary ban.

Death of Samantha often incorporated non-music performers, including Cleveland late-night horror host The Ghoul and organ grinder and monkey duo Pete and Pop.

Messy shows were also common on tour, according to Jersey City fanzine Away from the Pulsebeat.

The band's outfits matched their props, which were an assortment of whatever junk they could drag on stage. We Never Learn described Doug Gillard as looking like "a Kandinsky doodle of Johnny Thunders (fishnet armbands, glitter platforms), a Weimar-era prostitute (black stockings, lace) and a suburban punk (guitar slash shards and greeeezy hair)". James provided the stability, Petkovic the energy, according to Thurston Moore, writing in the liner notes to If Memory Serves Us Well: "When Sonic Youth first played Cleveland way back in the mid 80s it was at some biker bar that John Petkovic booked and he had his band Death of Samantha open up. I gotta say I was unprepared for the mania this kid brought to the stage".

Steve-O travelled to shows with large wardrobes, often packed in garbage bags, as Petkovic recounted in We Never Learn: "We flew out there and, as usual, our drummer Steve-O packied his 'costumes' (like a multicolored coat made out of shag rug) not in suitcases. but in large garbage bags. You could do that back then. When we were in baggage claim at LAX airport, his stuff eventually rolled out, strewn all over the carousel. We ended up getting to our first show late, at a called Nightmovies in Orange County. Not only did the promoter hate it and not want to pay me, but he hit me over the head with a gun, then pointed it at me and told me to get the fuck out".

While the band's warped style attracted a cult following, it also had its detractors, as indicated by letters to The Plain Dealer in response to a tour diary the Cleveland daily ran by Petkovic documenting a 1989 West Coast tour. One read: "Who cares about the daily diary of these weird musical misfits?" Another: "I was very offended and embarrassed for the city of Cleveland, knowing that its only newspaper had nothing better to feature in its July 9 magazine than the exploits of an obnoxious group of 'musicians.' Their only goal in life seems to be to not eat at Burger King, and to be sarcastic to everyone. Have you ever listened to them? They can hardly play instruments. Be real. Is this the kind of intelligent journalism that Cleveland wants to be known for?".

== Discography ==
Studio albums

- Strungout on Jargon (1986, Homestead)
- Where the Women Wear the Glory and the Men Wear the Pants (1988, Homestead)
- Come All Ye Faithless (1989, Homestead)
- If Memory Serves Us Well (2013, St. Valentine)

EPs

- Laughing in the Face of a Dead Man (1986, Homestead)

Singles

- "Amphetamine"/"Simple as That" (1985, St. Valentine)
- "Coca Cola and Licorice" (aka Porn in the USA) (1986, St. Valentine)
- "Rosenberg Summer" (1989, Homestead)
