= Homestead Records =

Record label

- Parent company: Dutch East India Trading Company
- Founded: 1983; 43 years ago
- Founder: Sam Berger
- Defunct: 1996
- Distributor: Dutch East India Trading
- Genre: Alternative rock; punk rock; experimental
- Country of origin: United States
- Location: New York City, New York, U.S.

Homestead Records was a Long Island, New York–based sublabel of music distributor Dutch East India Trading Company that operated from 1983 to 1996. Artists who worked with the label included Sonic Youth, Big Black, and Dinosaur Jr.

== History ==
Homestead Records was created and named by Sam Berger while he worked as the American Independent buyer at Dutch East India. Berger saw that many bands had already recorded tapes ready to be put out and just needed somebody to press them and distribute them. He came to Dutch East India owner Barry Tenenbaum who agreed to the venture. Tennenbaum had started a mail-order business, called Lord Sitar Records, from his bedroom when he was a teenager, importing records by the Beatles and other artists from England that he could sell for a profit in the States. Tenenbaum had established an extensive distribution network, called Dutch East India Trading, so when the Copyright Act of 1976 curtailed his ability to import artists who already had U.S. labels, he began licensing records for release and created the Homestead Records imprint for this purpose.

Berger left Homestead in 1984 and was replaced by Gerard Cosloy, the creator of the underground art fanzine Conflict. Cosloy would be the sole employee of the label until 1987 when Craig Marks was hired to assist him in running the label. Cosloy and Marks both resigned in 1990. Ken Katkin was the manager from 1990 to 1992, and Steven Joerg from 1992 to 1996. The label closed in 1996 with its last release being Ivo Perelman's Cama de Terra.

== Artists ==
- Antietam
- Babe the Blue Ox
- Bastro
- Beat Happening
- Beat Temptation
- Big Black
- Big Dipper
- Bloodsport
- Bodeco
- Brainiac
- Bratmobile
- Breaking Circus
- Bull
- David S. Ware
- Daniel Johnston
- Death of Samantha
- Dinosaur Jr
- Dredd Foole & the Din
- Einstürzende Neubauten
- Elliott Sharp
- Enrico Curreri
- Fish & Roses
- GG Allin
- Giant Sand
- Great Plains
- Green River
- Happy Flowers
- Honor Role
- Ivo Perelman
- King Kong
- Live Skull
- Love Child
- My Dad Is Dead
- Naked Raygun
- New Radiant Storm King (NRSK)
- Nice Strong Arm
- Nick Cave and the Bad Seeds
- One Plus Two
- OWT
- Phantom Tollbooth
- Pony
- Salem 66
- Screaming Trees
- Seam
- Sebadoh
- Sleepyhead
- Smack Dab
- Sonic Youth
- Sorry
- Soul-Junk
- Squirrel Bait
- Stratotanker
- SSD
- Supreme Dicks
- Swans
- Table
- Tall Dwarfs
- The Blackjacks
- The Cakekitchen
- The Chills
- The Dentists
- The Dogmatics
- The Ex
- The Flies
- The Frogs
- The Hedonists
- The Holy Men
- The Mad Scene
- The Meatmen
- The Membranes
- The Micronotz
- The Outnumbered
- The Pastels
- The Proletariat
- The Verlaines
- Thomas Jefferson Slave Apartments
- Trumans Water
- Tsunami
- U-Men
- Uzi
- Volcano Suns
- Weird Paul Petroskey
- William Hooker
- William Parker
- Wombats

== See also ==
- List of record labels
- Matador Records
