= Doug Gillard =

American guitarist and songwriter (born 1965)

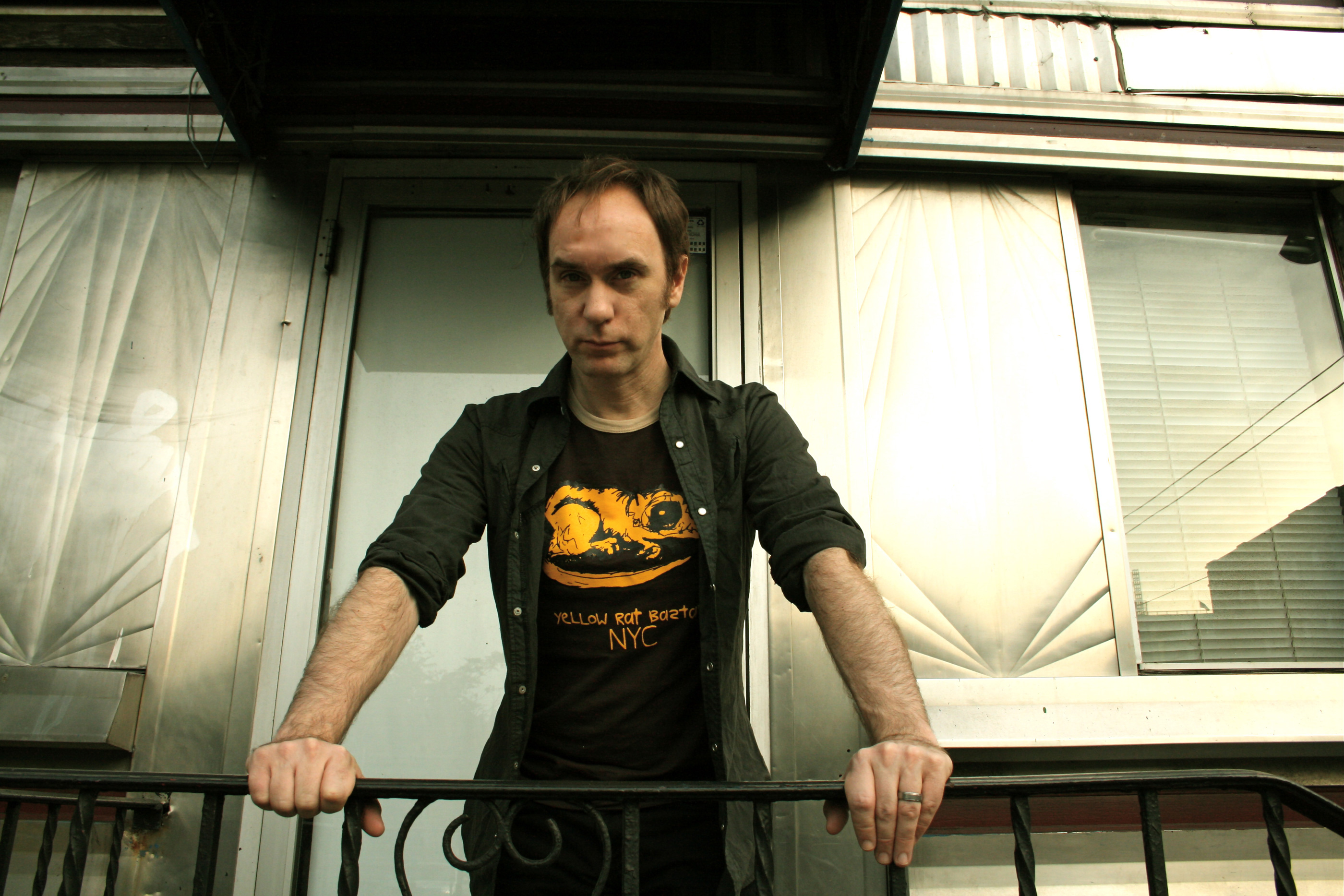

Background information
- Born: December 23, 1965 (age 60); Sandusky, Ohio, U.S.
- Origin: Cleveland, Ohio, U.S.
- Genres: Rock, indie rock, pop
- Instruments: guitar, vocals, bass, piano, keyboards, drums, percussion, melodica
- Years active: 1982–present
- Member of: Bambi Kino, Cobra Verde, Death of Samantha, Gem, Guided by Voices, Lifeguards, Nada Surf
- Website: douggillard.com

Douglas Scott Gillard (born December 23, 1965) is an American guitarist and songwriter. He has been a member of major indie pop and punk bands, most notably Guided by Voices, Nada Surf, Bambi Kino, Death of Samantha, and Cobra Verde.

== Early life ==
Doug Gillard was born in Sandusky, Ohio. His parents were from Colorado, where his father helped construct missile silos, and his mother was a teacher's aide. Gillard grew up on a farm in rural Northeast Ohio, in the town of Huron, and attended schools in Elyria, Ohio.

By age five, Gillard was writing songs, which he recorded on a reel-to-reel tape machine to be mailed by his family to his older sister who lived in Germany.

Gillard moved to Cleveland after graduating high school. In 1984, he was briefly a non-student college radio DJ at Oberlin's WOBC, after which he was a DJ for six years at Cleveland State University's WCSB, concurrent with his musical career in the late 1980s.

== Musical groups ==
Beginning in high school, Gillard began performing with Ohio punk bands such as Suspect Device, Children's Crusade, and Starvation Army. He has also performed and/or recorded with Richard Buckner, Yuji Oniki, My Dad Is Dead, The Mice, Bill Fox, Fence Lions, Zest of Yore, Stewart Pack, The Oranges Band, Mascott, and Sally Crewe and The Sudden Moves.

As a result of Gillard's appearances on Guided by Voices' Suitcase and Suitcase 2 box sets, he is sometimes erroneously credited as a member of a variety of fictitious bands (e.g., Approval of Mice, Champion Hairpuller), due to Robert Pollard's creation of new imaginary band names for nearly every track of his compilations of outtakes and demos.

=== Death of Samantha and Cobra Verde ===
In the 1980s, Gillard was a member of the Ohio-based band Death of Samantha, a "modernist pop troupe" led by John Petkovic. After the breakup of Death of Samantha, Gillard became one of the original members of John Petkovic's 1990s band Cobra Verde.

Robert Pollard, who had been a fan of Gillard's since his Death of Samantha days, asked Cobra Verde in 1996 to be his backing band for Guided by Voices' Mag Earwhig! LP.

=== Guided by Voices ===
After joining forces with Guided by Voices as part of Cobra Verde, Gillard remained a member of Guided by Voices for about seven years, from 1997 to 2004, a period that encompassed six official LPs and numerous other releases.

Gillard's association with Pollard also resulted in three albums in collaboration as a duo: 1999's Speak Kindly of Your Volunteer Fire Department (credited to Robert Pollard and Doug Gillard), and two albums credited to Lifeguards, Mist King Urth in 2003, and Waving at the Astronauts in 2011.

On July 25, 2016, it was announced Gillard rejoined Guided by Voices.

=== Gem ===
In the early 1990s, Gillard launched Gem, his own band, which also included bassist Tim Tobias (later of Guided by Voices). Gem's debut album, Hexed, was recorded in 1994 and released on Restless Records in 1995.

The Cleveland Scene praised the group as a "velveteen rock combo," and the editor of Cleveland's Alternative Press cited Gem's song "Suburban Girl" as "one of the greatest things in the history of Cleveland rock." Trouser Press called Hexed a "tuneful rush of smart, catchy and simple rhythm guitar pop-rock – sort of grown-up Weezer without the anxious pretensions." According to Trouser Press, Gillard's contributions stood out as "crafty," with "the woolly and weird chant of 'Sheep,' the bracing T. Rex borrowings of 'Your Heroes Hate You' and the countryfied pun of 'Only a Loan.'" In 2001, Gem reunited to release another album, Sunglare Serenades.

=== Bambi Kino ===
Gillard was one of the founding members of Bambi Kino, a band formed in anticipation of 2010's fiftieth anniversary of the first Beatles shows in Hamburg, Germany. The band also includes Nada Surf drummer Ira Elliot, Mark Rozzo (guitarist for Maplewood and Champale) and Erik Paparazzi (bass player for Cat Power).

The group covers songs from the formative 1960–1962 pre-celebrity era of The Beatles in Hamburg and at the Cavern Club. The band took its name from the Bambi Kino, a squalid movie theater in Hamburg where the Beatles lived in cramped storerooms.

Working with Hamburg-based Tapete Records, the band debuted with a week of shows in August 2010 at the Indra Club in Hamburg, where the Beatles first played. In 2011, Tapete released the group's self-titled debut album. The record was praised by AllMusic's James Allen for its authentically "scrappy Merseybeat style," resulting in an album that "also happens to rock on its own merits." In an interview, Rozzo said, "We very consciously didn’t want to be a tribute band. We wanted to be ourselves, and in doing that we thought we were being truer to The Beatles."

The group remains active. In May 2014, Bambi Kino played at a benefit concert at Brooklyn's Bell House as well as the White House Correspondents Jam, in Washington, DC, with Chuck Leavell.

=== Nada Surf ===
In 2010, Gillard joined the band Nada Surf, which had been formed in 1992 by Matthew Caws and Daniel Lorca. The line-up of Caws, Lorca, drummer Ira Elliot, and Gillard appeared on Nada Surf's 2012 album The Stars Are Indifferent to Astronomy.

== Solo career ==
In a 2014 article, the music magazine Blurt quoted Death of Samantha's John Petkovic assessing Gillard as a solo artist. Petkovic contrasted Gillard's consistent artistic openness since the 1980s with his limited name recognition:

Some people attribute being open and adventurous with age, youth. But that’s not really true. You can tell who comes at music and art through imagination and who comes at it because they are attracted to some particular style... If you explore your imagination, you’ll never get "old." In that regard, little has changed with Doug when it comes to music – he just approaches it in the same way, attracted to sounds and parts. As a result, he’s able to synthesize disparate pieces that other people wouldn’t imagine fitting together until they saw the completed puzzle....

Doug deserves more attention, no doubt. But it's a larger thing – people are able to evaluate the name on the painting more than the painting. Doug has always been pretty dedicated to the painting, and that’s a good thing.

Gillard has recorded three full-length albums as a solo artist, not including his early cassette releases. Gillard's solo recording career technically began with two self-released cassettes, the four-song Cover Songs with Big Heads EP (1985), and a 1990 release of juvenilia recorded by Gillard at ages 5 to 9.

In 1999, Gillard's serious solo career began with the release of the five-song Malamute Jute EP. This was followed in 2004 by Salamander, his first solo full-length album made as an adult, and the 2008 album Call from Restricted.

=== Parade On ===
Gillard's 2014 solo album, Parade On, was released on Nine Mile Records. Blurt wrote that Parade On blends hooks with layers of guitars in a display of diverse examples of "steady, riff-based rock," and the British music magazine Bearded wrote that Gillard's "cup brims over with subtle gems," making Parade On a record "worthy of its own ecstatic praise."

AllMusic's Mark Deming called Parade On an eclectic and superbly crafted album of "guitar-fueled rock & roll with an extra portion of pop hooks" and lyrics in "various degrees of bittersweet snark." Deming praised Gillard as a gifted songwriter, guitarist, producer, and arranger, whose multi-instrumental performances included layers of strong lead and rhythm guitar work melding with "tough yet flexible" bass, in the service of songs ranging from "sparkly jangle" to "sweet but aggressive" hard-rocking power pop.

In April 2014, a music video by filmmaker Mike Postalakis was officially released for the album track "Ready for Death."

His following solo album, Parallel Stride, is scheduled to release on April 24, 2026.

== Other projects ==
Gillard produced indie band Eternal Summers' third album, The Drop Beneath. He has scored several independent films, including the comedy short film Creative Process 473 (2002), and American Cannibal (2006).

In 2014, Gillard recorded a version of Scott Miller's song "Dripping with Looks," which originally appeared on the 1987 Game Theory album Lolita Nation. Gillard's version, released as a music video in May 2014, was expected to appear on a Scott Miller memorial tribute album.

The song "Say Goodbye", with Gillard on guitar and lead vocals, and Peter Buck on mandolin, appears on the posthumous Game Theory album Supercalifragile (2017). Gillard shares songwriting credit for Miller's previously unfinished song, which Gillard completed.

Gillard presently lives in New York City and continues to perform solo and as a member of Guided by Voices, Nada Surf and other bands.

== Partial discography ==
=== Solo releases ===
==== Albums and EPs ====
- Cover Songs with Big Heads EP (1985)
  self-released cassette – sold mail order by Scat Records
- It'll Be Such a Thrill (1990)
  self-released cassette – sold mail order by Scat Records, contains songs recorded by Gillard at ages 5 to 9
- Malamute Jute EP (1999) (Cushion Records)
- Creative Process 473 (2003)
  contains 10 songs for motion picture soundtrack, plus 3 bonus original songs not on soundtrack
- Salamander (2004) (Pink Frost)
  distributed by Redeye Distribution, Inc.
- Call from Restricted (2008) (347 Records)
  2008 digital release, 2009 physical CD – contains 11 songs recorded in Tennessee, North Carolina, and Brooklyn, NY
- Parade On (2014) (Nine Mile Records)
  contains 11 songs recorded in New York, NY and Austin, Texas

==== Singles ====
- "Breaking in Two" b/w "So Much More" 7" (2011) (347 Records)

==== Videography ====
- "Ready for Death" (April 2014)
- "Dripping with Looks" (May 2014)

=== Collaborations with Robert Pollard ===
==== Albums ====
- Speak Kindly of Your Volunteer Fire Department (1999) – as Robert Pollard with Doug Gillard
- Mist King Urth (2003) – as Lifeguards
- Waving at the Astronauts (2011) – as Lifeguards
- Starting Point of the Royal Cyclopean (2016) - as ESP Ohio

==== Singles ====
- "Product Head" b/w "Naught Windsor" 7" (2011) (Serious Business Records)
