= Nada Surf discography =

- Studio albums: 10
- Extended plays: 5
- Singles: 22

The discography of Nada Surf, a New York-based alternative rock group, consists of ten studio albums, twenty-two singles and five extended play (EPs). Nada Surf was formed in 1992 and consists of Matthew Caws (guitar, vocals), Daniel Lorca (bass, backup vocals), and Ira Elliot (drums, backup vocals).

== Studio albums ==
List of albums, with selected chart positions
| Title | Album details | Peak chart positions | | | | | | | | | |
| Title | Album details | US | AUT | BEL | FRA | GER | NLD | SPA | SWE | SWI | UK |
|---|---|---|---|---|---|---|---|---|---|---|---|
| High/Low | Released: June 18, 1996; Label: Elektra; Formats: CD, Cassette (CS) | 63 | — | 36 | 37 | — | — | — | 31 | — | — |
| The Proximity Effect | Released: September 22, 1998; Labels: Elektra (Europe), MarDev Records (2000); Formats: CD, CS, LP | — | — | — | 45 | — | — | — | — | — | — |
| Let Go | Released: February 4, 2003; Labels: Barsuk; Formats: CD, 2-LP, digital download | — | — | — | 32 | — | — | — | — | — | — |
| The Weight Is a Gift | Released: September 20, 2005; Labels: Barsuk, City Slang (Rough Trade); Formats: CD, LP, digital download | 167 | — | — | 47 | 51 | — | — | — | 59 | — |
| Lucky | Released: February 5, 2008; Labels: Barsuk, City Slang (Rough Trade); Formats: CD, LP, digital download | 82 | — | 97 | 41 | 33 | 98 | — | — | 39 | 193 |
| If I Had a Hi-Fi | Released: June 8, 2010; Label: Mardev Records; Formats: CD, 2-LP, digital download | — | — | — | 153 | — | — | — | — | 86 | — |
| The Stars Are Indifferent to Astronomy | Released: January 18, 2012 (Japan) January 23, 2012 (UK/EU) January 24, 2012 (US); Label: Barsuk Records; Formats: CD, LP, digital download | 86 | 46 | — | 86 | 31 | — (Note: The Stars Are Indifferent to Astronomy did not enter the Dutch Album Top 100, but entered the Dutch Alternative Top 30 chart at number 24.) | — | — | 42 | 190 |
| You Know Who You Are | Released: March 4, 2016; Label: Barsuk Records; Formats: CD, LP, digital download, streaming | — (Note: You Know Who You Are did not enter the US Billboard 200, but peaked at number 88 on the US Current Album Sales Chart.) | 51 | — | 118 | 47 | — | 61 | — | 46 | — |
| Never Not Together | Released: February 7, 2020; Label: Barsuk Records/City Slang; Formats: CD, LP, digital download, streaming | — (Note: Never Not Together did not enter the US Billboard 200, but peaked at number 44 on the US Album Sales Chart.) | — | — | 135 | 49 | — | 41 | — | 63 | — (Note: Never Not Together did not enter the UK Albums Chart, but peaked at number 97 on the UK Album Sales Chart.) |
| Moon Mirror | Released: September 13, 2024; Label: New West; Formats: CD, LP, digital download, streaming | — | — | — | — | — | — | — | — | — | — (Note: Moon Mirror did not enter the UK Albums Chart, but peaked at number 78 on the UK Album Sales Chart.) |

== Extended plays ==
| Year | Title | Label/Type |
|---|---|---|
| 1996 | Karmic (EP) | No.6 Records - CD +++ 2007 reissue on Hi-Speed Soul Records - digital/CD/12" incl. bonus track |
| 2006 | All You Need Is Love (radio only EP) | Barsuk Records - digital/promo CD |
| 2008 | The MySpace Transmissions (EP) | MySpace Records/Barsuk Records - digital/CD Ltd. |
| 2012 | The Dulcitone Files (EP) | Barsuk Records - digital/CD |
| 2021 | Cycle Through (EP) | Barsuk Records - digital |

== Singles ==
List of singles, with selected chart positions and certifications, showing year released and album name
| Title | Year | Peak chart positions | | | | | | | | | | Certifications (sales thresholds) | Album |
| Title | Year | US | AUS | BEL | FRA | JPN | NLD | NZ | SWE | SWI | UK | Certifications (sales thresholds) | Album |
|---|---|---|---|---|---|---|---|---|---|---|---|---|---|
| "Popular" | 1996 | 51 | 43 | 21 | 10 | — | 54 | 40 | 13 | — | 123 | SNEP: Gold | High/Low |
| "Treehouse" | 1996 | — | — | — | — | — | — | — | — | — | — | | High/Low |
| "Deeper Well" | 1996 | — | — | — | — | — | — | — | — | — | — | | High/Low |
| "Why Are You So Mean to Me?" | 1998 | — | — | — | — | — | — | — | — | — | — | | The Proximity Effect |
| "The Way You Wear Your Head" | 2002 | — | — | — | — | — | — | — | — | — | 142 | | Let Go |
| "Inside of Love" | 2002 | — | 95 | — | — | — | — | — | — | — | 73 | | Let Go |
| "Hi-Speed Soul" | 2003 | — | — | — | — | — | — | — | — | — | 87 | | Let Go |
| "L'Aventurier" | 2003 | — | — | — | 86 | — | — | — | — | — | — | | Let Go |
| "Always Love" | 2005 | — | — | — | 57 | — | — | — | — | — | — | | The Weight Is a Gift |
| "Imaginary Friends" | 2005 | — | — | — | — | — | — | — | — | — | — | | The Weight Is a Gift |
| "Whose Authority" | 2007 | — | — | — | — | — | — | — | — | 69 | — | | Lucky |
| "See These Bones" | 2007 | — | — | — | — | — | — | — | — | — | — | | Lucky |
| "I Like What You Say" | 2008 | — | — | — | — | — | — | — | — | 45 | — | | Lucky |
| "Electrocution" | 2010 | — | — | — | — | 65 | — | — | — | — | — | | If I Had a Hifi |
| "The Moon is Calling" | 2011 | — | — | — | — | — | — | — | — | — | — (Note: "The Moon is Calling" did not enter the UK Singles Chart, but peaked at number 100 on the UK Physical Singles Chart.) | | The Stars Are Indifferent to Astronomy |
| "Waiting for Something" | 2012 | — | — | — | — | — | — | — | — | — | — | | The Stars Are Indifferent to Astronomy |
| "Believe You're Mine" | 2015 | — | — | — | — | — | — | — | — | — | — | | You Know Who You Are |
| "Cold to See Clear" | 2015 | — | — | — | — | — | — | — | — | — | — | | You Know Who You Are |
| "Something I Should Do" | 2019 | — | — | — | — | — | — | — | — | — | — | | Never Not Together |
| "Looking For You" | 2019 | — | — | — | — | — | — | — | — | — | — | | Never Not Together |
| "So Much Love" | 2020 | — | — | — | — | — | — | — | — | — | — | | Never Not Together |
| "In Front of Me Now" | 2024 | — | — | — | — | — | — | — | — | — | — | | Moon Mirror |
"—" denotes a recording that did not chart or was not released in that territory.

== Other releases ==
| Type | Year | Title | Label | Info |
|---|---|---|---|---|
| CD | 1999 | North 6th Street | Noneties Music | compilation of demos, 7" versions and French versions of early songs - available only at shows & on www.nadasurf.com |
| CD | 2004 | Live in Brussels | Labels/EMI France | full concert recorded in house at l'Ancienne Belgique, Brussels, 2003-03-31 |
| DVD | 2004 | Live aux Eurockéennes de Belfort | Labels/EMI France | full concert filmed at Eurockéennes de Belfort festival, France, 2003-07-06 |
| Vinyl | 2008 | Vinyl Box Set 1994-2008 | Barsuk/City Slang | first 5 studio albums on 12" vinyl (High/Low only here!) plus repressing of debut 7" single, 24 pages 12" booklet incl. all lyrics, mp3-download code for 16 rare b-sides - limited edition of 1000 copies |
| Digital | 2014 | B-Sides | Barsuk | A compilation of digital rarities, which includes tracks that had previously only been available on limited-edition CDs, including a few [...] covers and tracks that were previously unreleased in the US. |
| CD/Vinyl/Digital | 2015 | Live At The Neptune Theatre | Self-released | Recorded Saturday, March 24, 2012 at the Neptune Theatre in Seattle, WA in the midst of a US tour in support of the album The Stars Are Indifferent to Astronomy. |
| CD/Vinyl/Digital | 2016 | Peaceful Ghosts | City Slang | An album of the band performing with the ORF Radio Symphony Orchestra (Vienna) and the Babelsberg Film Orchestra (Berlin) |

== Compilation and soundtrack appearances ==
- We Will Fall (Iggy Pop tribute) ("I'm Sick of You") - Royalty Records - 1997
- Where Is My Mind? Tribute to the Pixies ("Where Is My Mind?") - Glue Factory - 1999
- This Is Next Year: A Brooklyn-Based Compilation ("Blizzard of '77") - Arena Rock Recording Co. - 2001*
- Future Soundtrack for America ("Your Legs Grow") - Barsuk - 2004*
- Music from the OC: Mix 2 ("If You Leave" [OMD cover]) - WEA - 2004
- For the Kids Too! ("Meow Meow Lullaby") - Nettwerk America - 2004
- Love Rocks ("Inside of Love") - Human Rights Campaign/Centaur Entertainment - 2005
- Friends With Benefit (songs from One Tree Hill) ("Always Love") - 2006
- John Tucker Must Die: Music from the Motion Picture ("I Like What You Say") - Wind-Up - 2006*
- Rails & Ties ("In the Mirror") - Milan Records - 2007*
- Heroes: Original Soundtrack ("Weightless") - NBC Universal Television, DVD, Music & Consumer Products Group - 2008
- Nano-Mugen Compilation 2009 ("Weightless") - Ki/oon Records - 2009
- Nano-Mugen Compilation 2011 ("Mustang" [ ASIAN KUNG-FU GENERATION cover]) - Ki/oon Records - 2011

* All are non-album versions of each song

== Films, TV programs, games and adverts ==
- Nada Surf have been featured several times in the television series One Tree Hill:
  - "Inside of Love" was played in season 1 episode 13.
  - "Always Love" was played in season 3 episode 3.
  - The band make a guest appearance on season 3 episode 11 playing "Concrete Bed" in concert as Peyton (Hilarie Burton) is trying to convince their band manager to agree to be a part of the benefit CD which is later named as Friends with Benefit.
  - "See These Bones", "Here Goes Something", "I LIke What You Say" and "The Film Did Not Go Round" appeared in season 5 episode 10.
  - "Are You Lightning?" was used in season 6 episode 17, which had Matthew Caws as a guest composer for the episode score.
- Nada Surf performed the "Kitty Cat Song" used as the theme tune for the 2006 game Catz, officially titled "Meow Meow Lullaby Remix". The song was written by Matthew Caws, Ira Elliot and Daniel Lorca, with additional vocals from Lianne Smith.
- Nada Surf covered The Beatles' "All You Need is Love" in 2006. The cover was featured in a Chase Bank credit card television commercial in the U.S.
- “Blankest Year” featured in a 2006 TV commercial for the Suzuki Swift in Germany.
- The song "Blonde on Blonde" from Let Go is featured during the opening and end credits to the 2004 German film Sommersturm (Summer Storm). "Blonde on Blonde" is also featured in the 2004 John Travolta film A Love Song for Bobby Long, and in the television series Six Feet Under.
- "What is Your Secret" from The Weight Is a Gift, was featured in "A New Light", episode 3 of the ABC series Six Degrees.
- Nada Surf recorded a cover of "If You Leave" by OMD for the television series The O.C. The song played during a prominent scene in which Seth Cohen (Adam Brody) shares an emotional goodbye with Anna Stern (Samaire Armstrong).
- Nada Surf songs have been played three times in the television show How I Met Your Mother; "Inside of Love" was featured in the first season, "Always Love" was featured in the twelfth episode of the second season, and "Beautiful Beat" was featured in the closing moments of the twelfth episode of the third season.
- "Always Love" is featured on the soundtrack to the 2007 film Disturbia.
- "Zen Brain" is featured in the 2001 German film No Regrets.
- "Hyperspace" is featured in the 2004 German film The Edukators and the 2009 remake of My Bloody Valentine.
- "I Like What You Say" is featured in the 2006 film John Tucker Must Die.
- "Weightless", from the album Lucky, premiered in the 30th episode (season 2, episode 7, "Out of Time") of the NBC television series Heroes, on November 6, 2007, and will appear on its original soundtrack.
- "The Fox", from Lucky, is featured in the closing montage of The Riches episode 204 "Slums of Bayou Hills".
- "Happy Kid" is featured in the opening scenes of an episode of Numb3rs entitled "When Worlds Collide".
