= Moon Mirror (album) =

Studio album by Nada Surf
- Released: September 13, 2024
- Length: 44:06
- Label: New West
- Producer: Ian Laughton; Nada Surf

Nada Surf chronology
Never Not Together (2020)	Moon Mirror (2024)

Moon Mirror is the tenth studio album by American band Nada Surf. It was released on September 13, 2024, by New West Records.

== Critical reception ==
Professional ratings
Aggregate scores
Source	Rating
Metacritic	82/100
Review scores
Source	Rating
AllMusic	4.5/5 stars
The Fire Note	4/5 stars
Glide Magazine	4.5/5 stars
MusicOMH	4/5
Paste	8.1/10 stars
PopMatters	7/10
Rolling Stone	4/4 stars
Stereo Board	3.5/5 stars

Moon Mirror received acclaim from critics. According to the review aggregator Metacritic, Moon Mirror received "universal acclaim" based on a weighted average score of 82 out of 100 from 10 critic scores.

Rob Sheffield of Rolling Stone called it Nada Surf's "most musically and emotionally passionate album in years, on the level of gems like Let Go, The Weight Is a Gift, and The Stars Are Indifferent to Astronomy." In a four-star review, John Murphy of MusicOMH dubbed the album "a fine example of just how consistent one of the USA's most overlooked rock bands have been over the decades."

Reviewing the album for AllMusic, Matt Collar claimed that, "Rather than bemoan the passing of time and youth, Nada Surf lean into their age on Moon Mirror, imbuing each song with a poetic, transcendental quality, one largely centered on the themes of gratitude and being present in the moment."

== Track listing ==
Moon Mirror track listing
No.	Title	Length
1.	"Second Skin"	3:59
2.	"In Front of Me Now"	3:42
3.	"Moon Mirror"	3:05
4.	"Losing"	4:06
5.	"Intel and Dreams"	2:24
6.	"The One You Want"	4:43
7.	"New Propeller"	5:18
8.	"Open Seas"	4:16
9.	"X Is You"	3:50
10.	"Give Me the Sun"	3:34
11.	"Floater"	5:09
Total length:		44:06

== Accolades ==
Publication	Accolade	Year	Rank
Rolling Stone	The 50 Best Indie Rock Albums of 2024	2024	21
Magnet	Top 25 Albums of 2025	2024	4

== Charts ==
Chart performance for Moon Mirror
Chart (2024)	Peak position
US Top Album Sales (Billboard)	46
