= Ewing Mitchell =

American actor

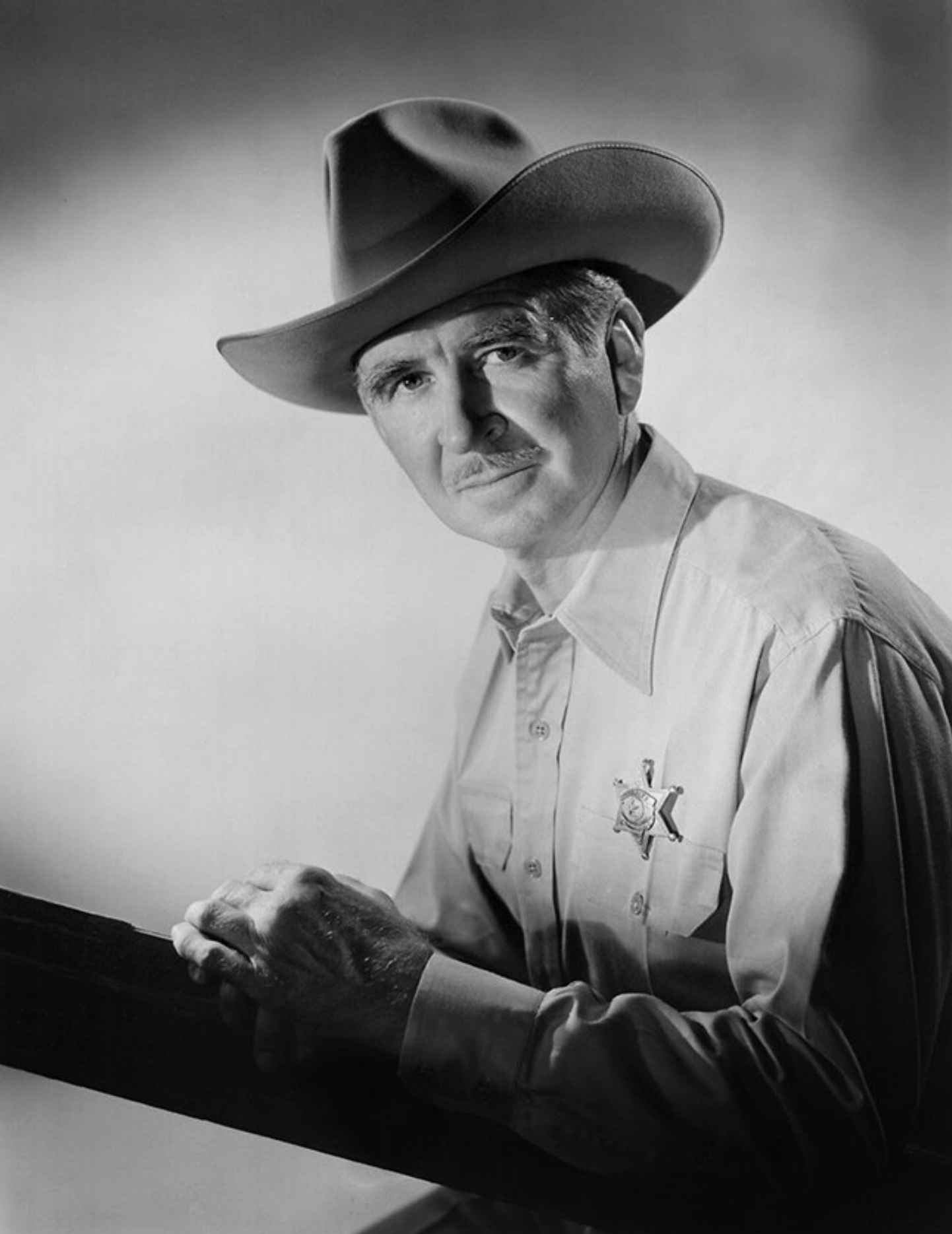
- Mitchell in 1959
- Born: Ewing Young Mitchell; December 29, 1910; Charleston, South Carolina, U.S.
- Died: September 3, 1988 (aged 77); La Jolla, California, U.S.
- Occupation: Actor
- Years active: 1930s–1959
- Children: 2

Ewing Young Mitchell (December 29, 1910 – September 3, 1988) was an American character actor of film and television best known for his role as Sheriff Mitch Hargrove in 26 episodes between 1956 and 1959 of the aviation adventure series with a western theme, Sky King. He also played Sheriff Powers on another western series, The Adventures of Champion.

== Early years ==
Mitchell was born in Charleston, South Carolina. His Episcopal minister father headed Porter Military Academy before he was appointed Episcopal Bishop of Arizona, which took the family to that state. In 1938, Mitchell left Arizona to study singing in Hollywood. He attended Hampden–Sydney College and Sewanee: The University of the South. He appeared and sang baritone on Broadway during the 1930s. He also appeared on Broadway in Song of Norway (1944).

== Acting career ==
Mitchell made his television debut at the age of 40 on January 1, 1951, in the syndicated western series, The Range Rider. On that series through January 1, 1953, he made ten other appearances, mostly as a law-enforcement officer, the genre in which he specialized. He was also cast in 1951 as a waiter in the episode "Bad Man of Brisco" of another syndicated western series, The Adventures of Kit Carson. He appeared in that same series twice in 1952, both times as a marshal, in the episodes "Trouble in Tuscarora" and "Golden Trap". He was cast in April 1952 in the episode "The Case of the Cold Neck" of the CBS crime drama Racket Squad, starring Reed Hadley. In 1953, he appeared as Mr. Collins in the episode "Defense Plant Security" of the syndicated Cold War drama, I Led Three Lives. He also had roles in several films, mostly uncredited, before and after those particular television appearances. By 1965, he had appeared in 20 films.

Ewing was cast in seven episodes each of The Gene Autry Show (1951–1953) and Gene Autry's related The Adventures of Champion (1955–1956). He appeared four times on The Roy Rogers Show and on the syndicated The Adventures of Wild Bill Hickok, with Guy Madison and Andy Devine, and Buffalo Bill, Jr., starring Dick Jones. On May 20, 1955, he played Adam Greer in the first-season episode "Farewell to Fort Apache" of The Adventures of Rin Tin Tin.

In 1956, he was cast in an episode of the CBS fantasy drama, The Millionaire, in the episode "The Jane Carr Story", with Angie Dickinson in the lead guest-starring role. He appeared twice in 1956 as Preacher Homer Wilkins in the CBS western series, The Adventures of Jim Bowie, starring Scott Forbes in the title role. In 1956, he played a Confederate colonel in the episode "Enemies" of Ronald W. Reagan's CBS anthology series, General Electric Theater.

His other appearances, mostly on westerns, include Sugarfoot, Tales of the Texas Rangers, Tales of Wells Fargo, The Lone Ranger, Annie Oakley, and The Life and Legend of Wyatt Earp. He played a sheriff in the Joel McCrea 1954 western film, Black Horse Canyon.

In 1958, he was cast as Fred Gerlock in "The Red Flannel Shirt" of the syndicated anthology series, Death Valley Days, hosted by Stanley Andrews. That same year, he made two appearances on John Payne's NBC western, The Restless Gun, as Dawson in "Gratitude" and as Sheriff Frank Kemper in "Bonner's Squaw".

It was Sky King, a contemporary western which originated on radio, with which Mitchell was most identified. He played the sheriff of fictional Grover County, Arizona. The series starred Kirby Grant as rancher Sky King who spent more time in his plane, the Songbird, than riding his horse.

Gloria Winters played Sky King's niece, Penny, and early in its run, Ron Hagerthy was cast as the nephew, Clipper King. The episodes on which Mitchell appeared began with "Manhunt" and "The Neckerchief" and included "Geiger Detective", "Land o'Cotton", "Rodeo Round-up", "Bad Actor", "A Dog Named Barney", "Sky Robbers", "Bounty Hunters", and "Dead Giveaway", his last appearance having been on March 1, 1959. The series filmed 72 total episodes.

Mitchell was one of the Silver Riders, expert equestrians who appeared in parades throughout the American Southwest. In his later years, Mitchell managed several ranches he owned in Southern California. He died in 1988 at the age of 77 of a stroke caused by a fall from a ladder in La Jolla in San Diego County, where he had resided.

Mitchell was married and had two sons.

== Partial filmography ==
- Shades of Gray (1948) - U.S. Army Soldier
- Life of St. Paul Series (1949) - James the Just
- Tripoli (1950) - Elroy
- The Last Outpost (1951) - Maj. Riordan (uncredited)
- Francis Goes to the Races (1951) - Board Member (uncredited)
- I'll See You in My Dreams (1951) - Doctor (uncredited)
- Rancho Notorious (1952) - Suitor (uncredited)
- Without Warning! (1952) - Mr. Kent (uncredited)
- Sudden Fear (1952) - Bridge Party Guest (uncredited)
- Horizons West (1952) - Poker Player (uncredited)
- Springfield Rifle (1952) - Capt. Spencer (uncredited)
- Above and Beyond (1952) - Gen. Kenneth Bonner Wolfe (uncredited)
- The Blazing Forest (1952) - Walt, a Ranger
- Winning of the West (1953) - Ranger Captain Tom Hickson (uncredited)
- Those Redheads from Seattle (1953) - Mr. Fawcett (uncredited)
- Drums Across the River (1954) - The Colonel (uncredited)
- Black Horse Canyon (1954) - Sheriff
- Man Without a Star (1955) - Ben Johnson (uncredited)
- The Court-Martial of Billy Mitchell (1955) - Court-Martial Judge (uncredited)
- Behind the High Wall (1956) - Judge Robert Pryor (uncredited)
- Band of Angels (1957) - Old Gentleman (uncredited)
- The Restless Gun (1958) - Episode "Gratitude"
- Gunman's Walk (1958) - Mr. Johnson (uncredited)
- The Gunfight at Dodge City (1959) - Townsman (uncredited)
