= Peter Caws =

British American philosopher and administrator (1931–2020)

Peter J. Caws (May 25, 1931 – April 20, 2020) was a British-American philosopher and administrator, and University Professor of Philosophy and Professor of Human Sciences at the George Washington University.

== Biography ==
Peter Caws was born in Southall, Middlesex, England in 1931. He received his B.Sc. in Physics at the University of London in 1952, and his PGCE in 1953. In 1953 he emigrated to the US and received his Ph.D. in Philosophy at Yale University in 1956.

Caws started teaching natural science at Michigan State University in 1956. In 1957 he went to the University of Kansas to teach philosophy, and he chaired the Philosophy Department from 1961 until 1962. From 1962 to 1967 he was an officer and then consultant at Carnegie Corporation of New York. From 1965 to 1982 he worked at the City University of New York, first as chair of the Hunter College Philosophy Department and from 1967 until 1970 as executive officer of the Ph.D. Program in Philosophy at the Graduate Center.In 1982 he was appointed University Professor of Philosophy and subsequently also Professor of Human Sciences at the George Washington University. He was a visiting professor at the University of Costa Rica, New York University and the University of Maryland, College Park.

In 1966-67 he was president of the Society for General Systems Research, now the International Society for Systems Science. In 1967 he was vice-president of the American Association for the Advancement of Science. From 1974 to 1984 he was board member and chair of the Committee on International Cooperation of the American Philosophical Association. In 1988-89 he was president of the Washington Philosophy Club and from 1992 to 1994 he was president of the Société Américaine de Philosophie de Langue Française.

Caws was awarded a Fulbright travel grant in 1953, a fellowship of the American Council of Learned Societies in 1972 and a Humanities Fellowship from the Rockefeller Foundation in 1979-80. He was a National Lecturer at the Society of the Sigma Xi in 1975-77 and a Phi Beta Kappa Visiting Scholar in 1983-84. He gave the first Philip Morris Distinguished Lectures in Business and Society, Baruch College, New York, 1986. He was elected an honorary member of Phi Beta Kappa, Alpha of the District of Columbia in 1992.

Peter Caws was first married to Mary Ann Caws, an American author, art historian and literary critic. They had a daughter, Hilary Caws-Elwitt, and a son, Matthew Caws, lead singer of the band Nada Surf. In 1987 he married Dr. Nancy Breslin, a psychiatrist and now a photographer, and they had a daughter, Elisabeth.

Peter Caws died at home on April 20, 2020.

== Publications ==
Peter Caws wrote or edited the following books and published more than 150 articles.

- 1965, The Philosophy of Science: A Systematic Account. Princeton: Van Nostrand.
- 1967, Science and the Theory of Value. New York: Random House.
- 1972, The Bankruptcy of Academic Policy. (co-author) Washington: Acropolis Books.
- 1979, Sartre: The Arguments of the Philosophers. London: Routledge and Kegan Paul.
- 1980, Two Centuries of Philosophy in America. (editor) Oxford: Blackwell.
- 1988, Structuralism: The Art of the Intelligible. Atlantic Highlands, N.J.: Humanities Press.
- 1989, The Causes of Quarrel: Essays on Peace, War, and Thomas Hobbes. (editor) Boston: Beacon Press.
- 1993, Yorick's World: Science and the Knowing Subject. Berkeley and Los Angeles: University of California Press.
- 1993, The Capital Connection: Business, Science, and Government. New York: Baruch College.
- 1996, Ethics from Experience. (editor, with Stefani Jones) Boston: Jones and Bartlett.
- 2007, Reason and Hope: Knowledge, Belief and the Future of Humanity. Washington, D.C.: River Horse Press.
- 2010, Religious Upbringing and the Costs of Freedom. (editor, with Stefani Jones) University Park, PA: Penn State University Press.
- 2019, The Book of Hylas. (Text by Peter Caws with illustrations by Line Hoven (de); accompanying recording with music by the Parkington Sisters.) Seattle: Barsuk Records.
