= Bill Fox (musician) =

American songwriter

Bill Fox is an American musician from Cleveland, Ohio musician who fronted the garage pop band The Mice and released two solo albums before abruptly leaving the music industry in 1998. After a cult following built over many years, music royalties enticed Fox to semi-reluctantly return to music in 2007. He released a third solo album in 2012.

== Early career ==
Bill Fox was the lead singer and guitarist of the three-piece Cleveland, Ohio garage pop band The Mice from 1984 to 1988. The band released one single, one EP and one LP before Fox unexpectedly and suddenly exited the band, much to the dismay of his brother and bandmate Tommy Fox.

The band was one of the most successful indie bands on the burgeoning Ohio power pop scene at the time, and has been cited as an influence by the Dayton, Ohio band Guided by Voices.

== Solo career and exit from music ==
In the 1990s, Fox released two solo folk albums. The Lo-fi recordings on these albums were often made in his apartment using a 4-track cassette recorder using a microphone box or his thigh as percussion instruments.

After a brief West Coast tour for his second album, Fox promptly quit the music business and remained intentionally disconnected from all media contacts regarding his music for nearly a decade.

== Return to music ==
Fox was the subject of a lengthy article by Joe Hagan in the June/July 2007 issue of The Believer, in which he is referred to as "one of America’s greatest contemporary songwriters." Hagan set out to make contact with Fox and get an answer to the question "Why Did Bill Fox Stop Playing Music?" Though he did not meet Fox, he did get his answer. Hagan's article made a large impact on past and present fans of Fox to rediscover his music. Reportedly the article prompted some iTunes royalties that have inspired Fox to both allow the reissue of his solo albums and begin performing again.

On April 3, 2008, Scat Records announced Fox had agreed to allow them to re-release both of his albums on vinyl and CD. Robert Griffin, owner of Scat Records, told cleveland.com what Fox thinks of the reissues: "He just thinks they're music, and God, if some of these weird people still want to buy 'em, OK, let's print some more up." The reissue of Shelter from the Smoke was released late 2009, adding three tracks from Fox's short-lived early 1990s group The Radio Flyers, as well as both songs from the 1995 Bird of the World 7" single. A reissue of Transit Byzantium has yet to appear.

In 2009, Fox began to perform again in his native Cleveland and surrounding areas. In May 2010, he headlined at the 16th anniversary concerts of Kelp Records, based in Ottawa, Ontario, Canada. Fox headlined anniversary performances in Toronto, Montreal and Ottawa.

On June 8, 2010, alternative rock band Nada Surf released a cover of Fox's song "Electrocution" on an album titled if i had a hifi.

On October 20, 2011, a video entitled "An Anthem For Occupy Wall Street" was uploaded to YouTube. It contains images of the Occupy Wall Street events of that year along with a previously unreleased song by Bill Fox, entitled "Men Who Are Guilty of Crimes." Bill Fox approved the song's use in the video, discussing it in a November 2011 interview.

In 2012, Fox released his first album of new music in 14 years titled One Thought Revealed. He continues to play occasional shows.

In 2016, Fox released his first single since 1995, a split seven inch with Forgotten Souls of Antiquity.

In 2017 a re-issue of his cassette-only album 'Before I Went to Harvard' was pressed onto 12" vinyl through Eleventh Hour Recording Company and a previously unreleased song entitled "Mole in the Ground was included on Sound Asleep Records' "Hit the Hay Vol. 9" compilation.

On April 15, 2025 Fox released a new album entitled Resonance.

== Discography ==
For a discography of The Mice, see The Mice

=== Singles ===
- "Bird of the World" b/w "I May Never Know" (Scat Records, 1996)
- "How It Feels" b/w Forgotten Souls of Antiquity "Your Blues" (Eleventh Hour Split 7", 2016)
- "Alaska" b/w "Pale Blue Eyes" (Eleventh Hour Recording Company 2025)

=== Albums ===
- Shelter from the Smoke (Cherry Pop release 15 tracks, 1996)
- Shelter from the Smoke (SpinArt release 18 tracks, 1997)
- Transit Byzantium (SpinArt, 1998)
- Shelter from the Smoke (Scat Records reissue 23 tracks, 2009)
- Before I Went To Harvard (Treasure Records previously unreleased recordings, 2011)
- One Thought Revealed (Jar Note Records, 2012)
- Resonance (Eleventh Hour Recording Company, 2025)

=== Compilation contributions ===
- I Stayed Up All Night Listening To Records (1998)
  - features "Electrocution" (mislabeled as Eclectrocution)
- Hit The Hay Volume 9 (2017)
  - features "Mole In The Ground" (previously unreleased recording)
