= The Silly Pillows =

American indie pop band

- Origin: United States
- Genres: Indie pop, Twee pop, Power pop, Lo-fi
- Years active: 1986 – 2008
- Labels: Hoppel di Hoy; Little Teddy Recordings; Perfect Pop; Rover Records; Teichiku Records
- Past members: Hilary Caws-Elwitt; Jonathan Caws-Elwitt; Cheryl De Luke; Christopher Earl; Sam Elwitt; Michael E. Fiato; Shauna Guidici; Dave Joachim; Belinda Miller; Linda Smith; Charlie Zayleskie
- Website: https://www.salticid.com/sillypillows/

The Silly Pillows were an American indie pop band formed by Jonathan Caws-Elwitt. They began as a home-recorded duo of Jonathan and his wife Hilary Caws-Elwitt, sharing tapes through the cassette underground. In the 1990s the band evolved into a studio-recorded full lineup, which dissolved in 2000. From 2005 to 2008, Jonathan and Hilary revived their home-recording career as "The Original Silly Pillows."

== History ==
In the early 1980s, Jonathan had been part of punk/psych/experimental group The Killer Asparagus (in the Boston area) and punk pop band The Degrads (in Rochester, NY, along with his brother Sam Elwitt). Jonathan started recording cassettes at home in 1984, and in 1986 he asked his wife Hilary Caws-Elwitt to join him on vocals, with the duo recording as the Silly Pillows.

The first Silly Pillows recordings were circulated on cassette through the growing network of home tapers, spurred by positive reviews in the magazines Option and Sound Choice (who said that "their whole catalog is essential listening"). In 1992, Hilary decided to stop singing, but by then their cassettes had attracted some attention in Europe. The tracks on the Silly Pillows' first vinyl release, "When She Gets Home," were home-recorded. In 1993, Jonathan assembled a group of friends for the Silly Pillows' first studio recordings, which were released as the "Equilibrium" EP on Norway's Perfect Pop label. The first studio lineup included Jonathan, Sam, Cheryl De Luke, and Christopher Earl of Squires of the Subterrain. Over the next few years, more studio recordings were released on vinyl and CD by Perfect Pop and the German label Little Teddy, bringing the band notice such places as Chickfactor ("It just bubbles over with vintage ambience and playfulness.... and it's more than just slightly pretty") and The Village Voice (making Elisabeth Vincentelli's "Pazz & Jop" top-10 list in 1996).

In 1996, the possibility of a Japanese tour led Jonathan to assemble a lineup that could perform live: Jonathan (vocals), Sam (guitar), Michael E. Fiato (bass), Dave Joachim (drums; later a best-selling cookbook author), singer-songwriter/artist Linda Smith (vocals), and Charlie Zayleskie (keyboards). Although the tour never happened, the Silly Pillows performed in New York and a few other locations, opening for acts like The Magnetic Fields. Belinda Miller of the kids' radio show Greasy Kid Stuff later became the co-vocalist; Time Out New York likened the Caws-Elwitt–Miller stage presence to "Mexican jumping beans." In Japan, where a split single (with Citrus) on Rover Records had reached No. 3 on the domestic singles chart, enthusiasm was high enough that a subsidiary of major Japanese label Teichiku released a "best-of" compilation, Pillow Paw Prints, in 1997. New Affections, released in 1998, was the Pillows' last full-length label recording.

In the 2000s, Jonathan began recording at home again, and he and Hilary began making new recordings as the "Original Silly Pillows." In 2007, Jonathan, Charlie, and Hilary made pop-festival appearances as "Silly Piano Pillows."

In 2010, an instrumental rendition of a 1990 Silly Pillows track, "I Remembered What I Was Going to Say," was released by Nada Surf as part of their covers album If I Had a Hi-Fi.

== Style ==
Stylistically, the band's music has been described as "gems replete with incisive hooks, mindblowing harmonies and solos, and varied multilayered instrumentation with creative stylistic unpredictability and arresting rhythms." Jonathan has stated that his goal is to achieve "exuberance, sincerity, and beauty without sadness."

== Other projects ==
- Jonathan and Hilary have collaborated with home-tapers Dreamgirl Stephanie Ashlyn and Ken Clinger.
- Hilary's brother, Matthew Caws, is the singer/guitarist in Nada Surf. Sam played bass for Matthew's first band, The Cost of Living. Jonathan co-wrote a song with Matthew for Because Because Because, a short-lived band between The Cost of Living and Nada Surf, and Matthew later sang backing vocals on the Silly Pillows track "Katy Tongue in Cheek."
- Jonathan co-wrote songs for The Neos, a Binghamton, NY studio project featuring Charlie.
- Jonathan wrote a song for the Norwegian band The Tables.
- Jonathan co-produced "My Picasso Girlfriend" for The Dupont Circles.
- Charlie's song "Space Pilot Astrud Star" (from the Starflower compilation) was co-written by Jonathan and featured performances by Dave and Sam.
- Sam is The Nutley Brass and was a member of Sea Monkeys. He wrote and performed music for the Queer Duck cartoons, and has produced two Miriam Linna albums. A 1990s solo project, The Hazeltones, featured some songs co-written with Jonathan.
- Charlie was part of Stew's Passing Strange show during its developmental phase.
- Michael went on to play with Destroy the Planet.
- Deco Pillow was a techno/dance side project of the Original Silly Pillows.

== Discography ==
=== Albums ===
(The Silly Pillows self-released many cassette-only albums from 1988 to 1993.)

- Look! The Dolby's Off! (MC)/(best-of cassette released to fan club only) – Perfect Pop – 1993
- Strangest of the Strange (LP) – Little Teddy – 1994
- Up in the Air (CD) – Perfect Pop – 1995
- Pillow Image Ltd. (LP) – Little Teddy – 1996
- Out of Our Depth (LP/CD) – Little Teddy/Perfect Pop – 1996
- Pillow Paw Prints ("best of" CD) – Teichiku – 1997
- New Affections (CD) – Little Teddy – 1998
- Silly Image Pillowhead (CD) – Ultraberry/Little Teddy – 1999

=== EPs ===
- "When She Gets Home" (7") – Hoppel di Hoy/Little Teddy – 1993
- "Equilibrium" (7") – Perfect Pop – 1994
- "Lukewarm Weather" (7") – Little Teddy – 1995
- Affectionette (7") – Rover – 1997
- Tomorrow Is Yesterday (online release) – 2000
- Black & White Bathroom (as Jonathan Caws-Elwitt; online release) – 2003
- I, Dentity (as Jonathan Caws-Elwitt; online release) – 2005
- Again with the Silly Pillows (as Original Silly Pillows; online release) – 2008

=== Singles ===
- "I Liked It – What Was It?" / "She's Just Being A Kid" (7", split single with Citrus) – Rover – 1996

=== Compilation albums ===
- USA Goes Pop (cassette) – Lonely Whistle – ca. 1990
- Pop Cult No. 4: Dopey (cassette) – 1992
- Produce (cassette) – Set – 1993
- Smash! Tinkle (LP) – Pico – 1993
- Sassy (cassette) – 1995
- Artfuck for All (cassette) – 1995
- Candybars (double 7") – Little Teddy – 1995
- A Perfect Pop Compilation, 1991–1994 (CD) – Perfect Pop 1995
- As Seen on TV (CD) – Spare Me – 1996
- McBain (cassette distributed with fanzine Runaway Balloon) – 1996
- I've Got It Now...A Popfest Compilation (cassette) – Shelflife – 1997
- Starring Nao (cassette) – Rover – 2000
- Shining Sun (CD distributed with fanzine Sofa 2) – Rewind – 2001
- Bestrummed: Perfect Pop 1995–2001 (CD) – Perfect Pop – 2001
- Woosh! Little Teddy Recordings 1991–2001 (CD) – Little Teddy – 2001
- Snowstorm: A Tribute to Galaxie 500 (double CD) – Elefant – 2001
- Floosh! Little Teddy Recordings 2002 (CD) – Little Teddy – 2002
- I Am a Victim of This Song (CD) – Baka-Poi – 2003
- Happy Happy Birthday to Me: Volume 3 (as Jonathan Caws-Elwitt; CD) – Happy Happy Birthday to Me – 2004
- Rewind and Pause: Cassette Culture Compilation Vol. 1 (double CD) – Cassette Culture – 2006
- Someone to Share My Life With: The Alternative Tribute to the Television Personalities (as Jonathan Caws-Elwitt; LP) – But Is It Art? – 2006
- I Would Write a Thousand Words (as Jonathan Caws-Elwitt; CD) – The Beautiful Music – 2007
- Popfest! New England Fifth Anniversary Suitcase Comp (double CD) – Skipping Stones – 2008
- Tweest and Shout (as Original Silly Pillows; LP) – Perfect Pop – 2011
- This Reminds Me: Songs By Linda Smith Reimagined (cassette) – Lost Sound – 2018
