= Mary Ann Caws =

American art historian

Mary Ann Caws (born 1933) is an American author, translator, art historian and literary critic.

She is Distinguished Professor Emerita in Comparative Literature, English, French, Biography and Memoir, and Women's and Gender Studies at the Graduate School of the City University of New York. She is an expert on Surrealism and modern English and French literature.

== Career ==
Caws has written biographies of Marcel Proust, Virginia Woolf, and Henry James. She works on the interrelations of visual art and literary texts; has written biographies of Pablo Picasso and Salvador Dalí; and edited the diaries, letters, and source material of Joseph Cornell. She has also written on André Breton, Robert Desnos, René Char, Yves Bonnefoy, Robert Motherwell, and Edmond Jabès. She served as the senior editor for the HarperCollins World Reader, and edited anthologies including Manifesto: A Century of Isms, Surrealism, and The Yale Anthology of Twentieth Century French Poetry. Among others, she has translated Stéphane Mallarmé, Tristan Tzara, Pierre Reverdy, André Breton, Paul Éluard, Robert Desnos, and René Char.

She has been president of the Association for Study of Dada and Surrealism (1971–1975), Modern Language Association of America (1983), Academy of Literary Studies (1984–1985), and American Comparative Literature Association (1989–1991).

Caws is a fellow of the American Academy of Arts and Sciences; a life member of Clare Hall, Cambridge University; and a fellow of the New York Institute for the Humanities.

In October 2004, she published her autobiography, To the Boathouse: a Memoir (University Alabama Press), and in November 2008, a cookbook memoir: Provençal Cooking: Savoring the Simple Life in France (Pegasus Books).

Caws has contributed dozens of articles to the Brooklyn Rail.

== Personal life ==
She was married to Peter Caws, and is the mother of Hilary Caws-Elwitt and of Matthew Caws, lead singer of the band Nada Surf. She was married to Dr. Boyce Bennett (d.2023). She lives in New York City.

== Selected bibliography ==
=== As author ===
- Women of Bloomsbury: Virginia, Vanessa, and Carrington (1990, Routledge & Kegan Paul)
- Picasso's Weeping Woman: The Life and Art of Dora Maar (2000, Bulfinch Press)
- Virginia Woolf (Illustrated Lives) (2001, Penguin)
- Marcel Proust (Illustrated Lives) (2003, Overlook Press)
- Henry James (Illustrated Lives) (2006, Overlook Press)
- The Modern Art Cookbook (2013, Reaktion Books)

=== As editor ===
- Joseph Cornell's Theater of the Mind: Selected Journals, Letters, and Files (1994, Thames and Hudson)
- Surrealist Love Poems (2001, Tate Modern Museum)
- Manifesto: A Century of Isms (2001, University of Nebraska Press)
- Surrealism (Themes and Movements; with Jonathan Eburne) (2004, Phaidon)
- The Yale Anthology of Twentieth Century French Poetry (2004, Yale University Press)

=== As translator ===
- Stéphane Mallarmé, Selected Poetry and Prose (1982, New Directions)
- André Breton, Mad Love (1988, University of Nebraska Press)
- Selected Poems of René Char (with Tina Jolas) (1991, New Directions)
