= The Stars Are Indifferent to Astronomy =

Studio album by Nada Surf
- Released: January 18, 2012
- Recorded: 2011
- Genre: Alternative rock
- Length: 38:15
- Labels: Barsuk; City Slang
- Producers: Chris Shaw; Nada Surf

Nada Surf chronology
| If I Had a Hi-Fi (2010) | The Stars Are Indifferent to Astronomy (2012) | You Know Who You Are (2016) |

Professional ratings
Aggregate scores
| Source | Rating |
|---|---|
| AnyDecentMusic? | 6.1/10 |
| Metacritic | 69/100 |
Review scores
| Source | Rating |
| AllMusic | 4/5 stars |
| Alternative Press | 4/5 stars |
| The A.V. Club | B |
| Consequence of Sound | 3.5/5 stars |
| Entertainment Weekly | B |
| Mojo | 3/5 stars |
| Paste | 8.0/10 |
| Pitchfork | 4.4/10 |
| Q | 4/5 stars |
| Uncut | 3/5 stars |

The Stars Are Indifferent to Astronomy is the seventh album by alternative rock band Nada Surf. The album was released by Barsuk Records on January 18, 2012, in Japan, January 23, 2012, in Europe, and January 24, 2012, in the United States. It is their first album of original material since 2008's Lucky.

== Track listing ==
All tracks written by Matthew Caws, Daniel Lorca and Ira Elliot.

1. "Clear Eye Clouded Mind" – 3:40
2. "Waiting for Something" – 3:35
3. "When I Was Young" – 5:18
4. "Jules and Jim" – 4:24
5. "The Moon Is Calling" – 3:08
6. "Teenage Dreams" – 3:47
7. "Looking Through" – 4:00
8. "Let the Fight Do the Fighting" – 3:17
9. "No Snow on the Mountain" – 4:04
10. "The Future" – 3:02

Deluxe edition bonus CD

1. "The Future" (Acoustic) – 2:57
2. "Looking Through" (Acoustic) – 3:43
3. "When I Was Young" (Acoustic) – 4:44
4. "Waiting for Something" (Acoustic) – 3:37
5. "Clear Eye Clouded Mind" (Acoustic) – 3:48

== Personnel ==
Nada Surf

- Matthew Caws
- Daniel Lorca
- Ira Elliot

Additional musicians

- Doug Gillard – lead guitar
- Joe McGinty – keyboards
- Martin Wenk – trumpet, keyboards, xylophone
- Phillip Peterson – cello
- Louie Lino – keyboards
- Chris Shaw – guitar, keyboard

Production

- Chris Shaw – production
- Nada Surf – production
- Chris Shaw – mixing (at Sparky Space)
- Greg Calbi – mastering (for Sterling Sound NYC)
- Steve Fallone – mastering assistance (for Sterling Sound NYC)
- Tom Beaujour – engineering
