= Gary Hunley =

American film and television actor

- Occupation(s): Film and television actor

Gary Hunley is an American film and television actor. He is known for playing Mickey in the final season of the American western television series Sky King.

== Early life and career ==
In 1954 Hunley appeared in the anthology television series The Pepsi-Cola Playhouse. In 1956, he appeared in the "Faro Bill's Layout" episode of the anthology television series Death Valley Days. Hunley appeared in further television programs including Studio 57, Sugarfoot, Leave It to Beaver (1961; S4E19; “Beaver’s Old Buddy”), Dragnet, Alfred Hitchcock Presents (2 episodes), Dr. Kildare, Cimarron City and Wagon Train. In 1959, he made an appearance as Deputy Clay McCord's young brother Brandon McCord in the western television series The Deputy.

Hunley played Little Sanfran in the anthology television series Panic!. In 1959, he played the role of Mickey in the final season of the western television series Sky King. His film credits include The Unholy Wife (as Michael), Carnival Rock, The Big Operator and The Legend of Tom Dooley (as The Kid).

== Selected filmography ==
- Alfred Hitchcock Presents (1955) (Season 1 Episode 12: "Santa Claus and the Tenth Avenue Kid") as Boy
- Alfred Hitchcock Presents (1957) (Season 2 Episode 18: "The Manacled") as Billy
