= Lucky (Nada Surf album) =

2008 album by Nada Surf

Studio album by Nada Surf
- Released: February 5, 2008
- Recorded: March – August 2007
- Studio: Robert Lang (Shoreline, Washington)
- Genres: Alternative rock, indie rock
- Length: 42:35
- Label: Barsuk
- Producers: John Goodmanson, Tom Beaujour

Nada Surf chronology
The Weight Is a Gift (2005)	Lucky (2008)	If I Had a Hi-Fi (2010)

Professional ratings
Aggregate scores
Source	Rating
Metacritic	77/100 link
Review scores
Source	Rating
AbsolutePunk.net	(92%) link
The Album Project	link
AllMusic	link
Crawdaddy!	(favorable) link
NME	(7/10) link
Time Off	link
Slant	link

Lucky is the fifth album by alternative rock band Nada Surf. It was released on Barsuk in 2008.

== Recording ==
Frontman Matthew Caws said, "I feel like it is a pretty heavy record, and that is a product of John Goodmanson, the guy who made it because even the songs that were even moderately rocking – now that they are mixed and mastered, they feel like they are really kickin’ even when they are relatively quiet, so that's thanks to him. I think it is a little heavier than Let Go, but it's not as heavy as The Proximity Effect."

The album is produced, engineered and mixed by John Goodmanson besides some basic track recording work done by Chris Walla. It has been mastered at Sterling Sound by George Marino.

== Release ==
In 2007, the band issued a statement asking for testimonies revolving around the word "Lucky", in order to include them to the album artwork.

The song "See These Bones" premiered on the Anti-Hit List Podcast on October 20, 2007. Due to a misquotation of Matthew Caws, the album was first expected to be called Time for Plan A.

The album was made available for streaming through their Myspace profile on February 4, 2008, and was released through Barsuk Records the following day. It was released in the UK and Japan on February 18, 2008. The original pressing includes a 4-song bonus disc. In March and April 2008, the band embarked on a tour of the US; the first half was supported by the Little Ones, while the second half was covered by What Made Milwaukee Famous.

== Reception ==
The album was met with moderate success and favorable reviews. Lucky reached #82 on the Billboard 200. The single, "See These Bones", was listed by The Times as one of London's Best Songs of 2008, and described it as "2008's most overpoweringly propulsive and gloriously euphoric song".

Scott Hutchison of the band Frightened Rabbit cited the album as one as his favorites:

An album as a whole that I love is Lucky by Nada Surf. "See These Bones," that to me is a person, and an album, and a song. My girlfriend, Courtney, is completely embodied in that album. Every time I listen to it, it's like she's there, and that's really helped me a lot. It's really strange to have an album be a person. It's the first time I've kind of thought about it in that way, but it's true, and that brings a comfort in itself. The music is super comforting because it's got amazing harmonies. The thing I love about Nada Surf is you don't give a shit what year it is, they still sound like 1995. They've done it on their new album (You Know Who You Are) as well. I love that band.

— Scott Hutchison, Podcart (December 15, 2016)

== Track listing ==
All tracks written by Matthew Caws, Daniel Lorca and Ira Elliot, except where noted.

1. "See These Bones" 5:10
2. "Whose Authority" 3:01
3. "Beautiful Beat" 4:38
4. "Here Goes Something" 2:05
5. "Weightless" 3:32
6. "Are You Lightning?" 5:23
7. "I Like What You Say" 3:08
8. "From Now On" 2:35
9. "Ice on the Wing" 3:48
10. "The Fox" 5:40
11. "The Film Did Not Go 'Round" (Greg Peterson) 3:46

The release in France includes an additional track: "Je t'attendais".

Track listing for bonus disc

1. "Whose Authority" (acoustic)
2. "I Like What You Say" (acoustic)
3. "I Wanna Take You Home"
4. "Everyone's on Tour"

== Guest appearances ==
- Juliana Hatfield on "I Wanna Take You Home"
- John Roderick of The Long Winters on "Ice On The Wing"
- Sean Nelson of Harvey Danger on "See These Bones"
- Ed Harcourt, piano parts on "Weightless" and "Beautiful Beat"
- Ben Gibbard of Death Cab for Cutie on "See These Bones"
- Phil Wandscher of Jesse Sykes & the Sweet Hereafter
- Martin Wenk of Calexico, horns on "Ice On The Wing"
- Coralie Clément, high vocals on "The Fox"
- Louie Lino, keyboards
- Joe McGinty
- Lianne Smith, vocals on "The Film Did Not Go Round"
