= Sky King =

American radio and television series

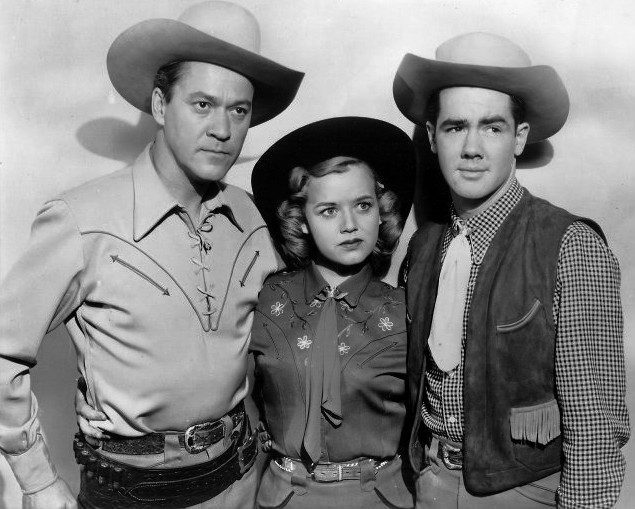
- Left to right: Grant as Sky King with Gloria Winters as his niece, Penny, and Ron Hagerthy as his nephew, Clipper.
- Genre: Western-themed adventure
- Starring: Kirby Grant; Gloria Winters; Ron Hagerthy; Ewing Mitchell; Gary Hunley; Chubby Johnson
- Theme music composer: Milton Raskin; Herbert Taylor
- Composers: Herschel Burke Gilbert; Alec Compinsky; Eve Newman
- Country of origin: United States
- Original language: English
- No. of seasons: 4
- No. of episodes: 72

Production
- Executive producer: Stuart E. McGowan
- Producers: Jack Chertok; Harry Poppe
- Camera setup: Single-camera
- Running time: 25 minutes
- Production companies: Jack Chertok Television Productions; McGowan Productions

Original release
- Network: NBC; ABC, Syndication
- Release: September 16, 1951 – March 8, 1959

Sky King is an American radio and television series. Its main character was Arizona rancher and aircraft pilot Schuyler "Sky" King.

The series had strong Western elements. Cattle rancher King often captured criminals and spies and found lost hikers, doing so with the use of his airplane, the Songbird. Two twin-engine Cessna airplanes were used by King during the course of the television series. The first was a Cessna T-50 and in later episodes a Cessna 310B was used until the end of the series. The 310's make and model type number was displayed prominently during the closing titles.

King and his niece Penny lived on the Flying Crown Ranch, near the fictional town of Grover, Arizona. Penny's brother Clipper also appeared during the first season. Penny and Clipper were also pilots, although they were inexperienced and used their uncle for guidance. Later, Penny became an accomplished air racer, rated as a multiengine pilot, whom Sky trusted to fly the Songbird.

== Radio synopsis ==
The radio show began in 1946 and was based on a story by Roy Winsor, the brainchild of Robert Morris Burtt and Wilfred Gibbs Moore, who also created Captain Midnight. Several actors played the part of Sky, beginning with Roy Engel and including John Reed King and Earl Nightingale. Jack Bivans played Clipper, and Beryl Vaughan portrayed Penny.

Radio premiums were offered to listeners, as was the case with many radio series of the day. For example, the Sky King Secret Signalscope was used on November 2, 1947, in the Mountain Detour episode. Listeners were advised to get their own for only 15 cents and the inner seal from a jar of Peter Pan Peanut Butter, which was produced by the sponsor, Derby Foods. The Signalscope included a glow-in-the-dark signaling device, whistle, magnifying glass, and Sky King's private code. With the Signalscope, one could also see around corners and trees. The premiums were innovative, such as the Sky King Spy-Detecto Writer, which had a decoder (cipher disk), magnifying glass, measuring scale, and printing mechanism in a single package slightly more than two inches long. Other notable premiums were the Magni-Glo Writing Ring, which had a luminous element, a secret compartment, a magnifier, and a ballpoint pen, all in the crown piece of a "fits any finger" ring.

The radio series continued until 1954, broadcasting simultaneously with the early portion of the television version.

== Television synopsis ==
The television version featured Kirby Grant as Sky King, and Gloria Winters as Penny. Other regular characters included Sky's nephew Clipper, played by Ron Hagerthy, and Mitch the sheriff, portrayed by Ewing Mitchell. Mitch, a competent and intelligent law enforcement officer, depended on his friend Sky's flying skills to solve the more difficult cases. Other recurring characters included Jim Bell, the ranch foreman, played in four episodes by Chubby Johnson, as well as Sheriff Hollister played by Monte Blue in five episodes, and Bob Carey, portrayed in ten episodes by Norman Ollestad.

After appearing in the first 19 episodes of the show, Hagerthy was drafted into the Army; the show stated Clipper had joined the Air Force. His army service ending in 1955, he was more interested in motion pictures than rejoining the show. Unlike Grant and Winters, he never made any personal appearances for the show.

Many of the story lines would feature the supporting cast finding themselves in near-death situations and the hero rescuing them with seconds to spare. Penny would particularly often become a captive of spies, bank robbers, and other ne'er-do-wells.

Sky never killed the villains, as with most television cowboy heroes of the time. Sky King was primarily a show for children, although it sometimes broadcast during prime time. The show also became well known among aviation personnel. Many pilots, including American astronauts, grew up watching Sky King and named him as an influence.

Plot lines were often simplistic, but Grant's casual, natural treatment of technical details made his flying ability relatively believable.

Likewise, villains and other characters were often depicted as reasonably intelligent and believable, rather than cartoonish. The antagonists usually had fairly logical motivations as opposed to seemingly random evil as common in many action dramas of the time. The writing was generally above the standard for contemporary half-hour programs, although sometimes critics suggested that the acting was not.

Later episodes of the television show were notable for the dramatic opening with an air-to-air film of the sleek, second Songbird banking sharply away from the camera and its engines roaring, while the announcer proclaimed, "From out of the clear blue of the Western sky comes Sky King!" The short credit roll which followed was equally dramatic, with the Songbird swooping at the camera across El Mirage Lake, California, then pulling up into a steep climb as it departed. The end title featured a musical theme, with the credits superimposed over an air-to-air shot of the Songbird, cruising at altitude for several moments, then banking away to the left.

The show also featured low-level flying, especially with the later Songbird, highlighting the desert flashing by in the background.

== Cast ==
- Kirby Grant as Schuyler "Sky" King
- Gloria Winters as Penny King
- Ewing Mitchell as Sheriff Mitch Hargrove
- Ron Hagerthy as Clipper King
- Gary Hunley as Mickey (final season)

=== Recurring cast ===
- Norman Ollestad as Bob Carey
- Chubby Johnson as Jim Bell
- Monte Blue as Sheriff Hollister
- Terry Kelman as Davey Wilson

=== Guest stars ===
- Stanley Andrews
- John Banner
- Richard Beymer
- James Brown
- Stephen Chase
- Gary Clarke
- Karl Davis
- Mason Alan Dinehart
- Herman Hack
- Darryl Hickman
- Michael Hinn
- Ed Hinton
- I. Stanford Jolley
- Ted Jordan
- Fred Krone

- Walter Maslow
- Gregg Palmer
- James Parnell
- Sammee Tong
- Mike Ragan
- Robert Rockwell
- Frank J. Scannell
- Roy N. Sickner
- Jill St. John
- Boyd Stockman
- Glenn Strange
- Robert Tetrick
- Carol Thurston
- Lee Van Cleef

== Episodes ==
=== Season 1 ===
No. overall	No. in season	Title	Directed by	Written by	Original release date
1	1	"Operation Urgent"	Hollingsworth Morse (as John H. Morse)	David P. Sheppard	April 5, 1952
2	2	"Carrier Pigeon"	John H. Morse	Bill Bruckner Ray Winsor	April 19, 1952
3	3	"Stagecoach Robbers"	John H. Morse	Tom Seller	May 3, 1952
4	4	"Deadly Cargo"	John H. Morse	Sidney Renthal Harry Poppe Jr. Don Tait	May 17, 1952
5	5	"Jim Bell's Triumph"	John H. Morse	David P. Sheppard	May 31, 1952
6	6	"Designing Women"	John H. Morse	Curtis Kenyon	June 14, 1952
7	7	"One for the Money"	John H. Morse	Joe Richardson	June 28, 1952
8	8	"Danger Point"	John H. Morse	Charles Larsen	July 12, 1952
9	9	"Desperate Character"	John H. Morse	Tom Seller	July 26, 1952
10	10	"The Man Who Forgot"	John H. Morse	Tom Seller	August 9, 1952
11	11	"The Threatening Bomb"	John H. Morse	Charles Larson	August 23, 1952
12	12	"Speak No Evil"	John H. Morse	Charles Larson	September 6, 1952
13	13	"Two-Gun Penny"	John H. Morse	Tom Seller	September 20, 1952
14	14	"Formula for Fear"	Paul Landres	Joe Richardson	October 4, 1952
15	15	"The Giant Eagle"	Paul Landres	Curtis Kenyon	October 18, 1952
16	16	"Blackmail"	John H. Morse	David Lang	November 8, 1952
17	17	"Wings of Justice"	John H. Morse	David P. Sheppard	November 22, 1952
18	18	"Destruction from the Sky"	Paul Landres	Harry Poppe Jr. Roy Winsor	December 6, 1952
19	19	"The Porcelain Lion"	John H. Morse	Curtis Kenyon	December 20, 1952

=== Season 2 ===
No. overall	No. in season	Title	Directed by	Written by	Original release date
20	1	"The Neckerchief"	Stuart E. McGowan	Fran van Hartesveldt	January 2, 1956
21	2	"Man Hunt"	Clark L. Paylow	Barney A. Sarecky	January 2, 1956
22	3	"The Plastic Ghost"	Jodie Copelan	Adrian Gendot	January 9, 1956
23	4	"The Rainbird"	Jodie Copelan	Orville H. Hampton	January 9, 1956
24	5	"The Crystal Trap"	Stuart E. McGowan	Burt Sims	January 30, 1956
25	6	"The Red Tentacle"	Clark L. Paylow	Burt Sims	January 30, 1956
26	7	"Boomerang"	Clark L. Paylow	Orville H. Hampton	February 6, 1956
27	8	"The Geiger Detective"	Clark L. Paylow	Ed Erwin	February 6, 1956
28	9	"The Golden Burro"	Jodie Copelan	Burt Sims	February 27, 1956
29	10	"Rustlers on Wheels"	Jodie Copelan	Harry Poppe Jr.	March 5, 1956
30	11	"The Silver Grave"	Jodie Copelan	Burt Sims	March 5, 1956
31	12	"Uninvited Death"	Stuart E. McGowan	Adrian Gendot	March 12, 1956
32	13	"Fish Out of Water"	Jodie Copelan	Adrian Gendot	March 19, 1956
33	14	"Diamonds on a Sky-Hook"	Stuart E. McGowan	Fran van Hartesveldt	March 26, 1956
34	15	"Flood of Fury"	Stuart E. McGowan	Burt Sims	April 2, 1956
35	16	"Rocket Story"	Jodie Copelan	Adrian Gendot	April 2, 1956
36	17	"Rodeo Roundup"	Jodie Copelan	John O'Dea Jerry Thomas	April 23, 1956
37	18	"Showdown"	Stuart E. McGowan	Adrian Gendot	April 23, 1956
38	19	"Land o'Cotton"	Jodie Copelan	Tom Gries	April 30, 1956
39	20	"Dust of Destruction"	Jodie Copelan	Adrian Gendot	April 30, 1956

=== Season 3 ===
No. overall	No. in season	Title	Directed by	Written by	Original release date
40	1	"Mystery Horse"	Stuart E. McGowan	Tom Murray Pat Cherr	December 29, 1957
41	2	"Double Trouble"	Stuart E. McGowan	William Welch	December 29, 1957
42	3	"Note for a Dam"	Stuart E. McGowan	R.F. Maury	January 5, 1958
43	4	"Bad Actor"	Stuart E. McGowan	William Welch	January 5, 1958
44	5	"Fight for Oil"	Oliver Drake	David Karp	January 12, 1958
45	6	"Lost Boy"	Stuart E. McGowan	William Welch	January 12, 1958
46	7	"The Brain and the Brawn"	Ricard C. Kahn	Tom Murray Pat Cherr	January 26, 1958
47	8	"The Feathered Serpent"	Clark L. Paylow	Douglas Johnson	January 26, 1958
48	9	"The Circus Clown Mystery"	Oliver Drake	David Karp	February 22, 1958
49	10	"Dead Man's Will"	Clark L. Paylow	Fran Harris	February 22, 1958
50	11	"Cindy, Come Home"	Clark L. Paylow	William Welch	March 9, 1958
51	12	"Rodeo Decathlon"	Richard C. Kahn	William Welch	March 9, 1958
52	13	"Abracadabra"	Jodie Copelan	William Welch	March 9, 1958
53	14	"Triple Exposure"	Clark L. Paylow	Jack Anson Finke	March 9, 1958
54	15	"The Haunted Castle"	Jodie Copelan	William Welch	March 16, 1958
55	16	"Manhunt"	Herbert L. Strock	Douglas Johnson	March 16, 1958
56	17	"Danger at the Sawmill"	Stuart E. McGowan	Douglas Johnson	March 16, 1958
57	18	"Sleight of Hand"	Clark L. Paylow	Fran Harris	March 23, 1958
58	19	"The Runaway"	Clark L. Paylow	Douglas Johnson	March 23, 1958
59	20	"Stop That Train"	Herbert L. Strock	Fran Harris	March 30, 1958

=== Season 4 ===
No. overall	No. in season	Title	Directed by	Written by	Original release date
60	1	"The Wild Man"	Paul Landres	Alexander J. Wells	December 28, 1958
61	2	"Sky Robbers"	William J. Hole Jr.	John Grey & Del Lord	December 28, 1958
62	3	"A Dog Named Barney"	Paul Landres	Dwight V. Babcock	December 28, 1958
63	4	"Bullet Bait"	Paul Landres	Burt Sims	December 28, 1958
64	5	"Money Has Wings"	Paul Landres	Stanley H. Silverman C. Ray Stahl	January 4, 1959
65	6	"Frog Man"	William Witney	Sherman L. Lowe P.K. Palmer	January 4, 1959
66	7	"Terror Cruise"	Paul Landres	Budd Lesser William Lively	February 1, 1959
67	8	"Runaway Truck"	William Witney	Sherman L. Lowe P.K. Palmer	February 1, 1959
68	9	"Bounty Hunters"	William J. Hole Jr.	C. Ray Stahl P.K. Palmer	February 1, 1959
69	10	"A Mickey for Sky"	William Witney	John Grey C. Ray Stahl Sloan Nibley	February 22, 1959
70	11	"Dead Giveaway"	William Witney	Budd Lesser Sloan Nibley	March 1, 1959
71	12	"Ring of Fire"	Paul Landres	Burt Sims	March 1, 1959
72	13	"Mickey's Birthday"	Clark L. Paylow	John Grey C. Ray Stahl	March 8, 1959

== Production ==
A unique introduction featured the triangular Nabisco logo flying across the screen, accompanied by the sound of the Songbird flying past. Nabisco included plastic figures of characters from the show and the Songbird in packages of Wheat Honeys and Rice Honeys breakfast cereals.

The show's budget was $9,000 per episode.

The series was set in Arizona, but exteriors were actually filmed in the high desert of California at the Iverson movie ranch in Chatsworth and in the desert outside of Indio, California. Interiors were shot at General Service Studios in Hollywood. Grant recalled they filmed two episodes per week on a 2 1/2-day shooting schedule.

The house used for exterior shots of the Flying Crown Ranch was the home of golfer Lloyd Mangrum in Apple Valley, California. It has been extensively remodeled since its use as headquarters of the ranch. Other locations were shot in and around Apple Valley and the nearby San Bernardino Mountains, George Air Force Base, and Naval Air Weapons Station China Lake.

It was expensive for a children's show, but most of the budget went into aircraft, vehicles, fuel, and sets. This meant that some standard production methods had to be abandoned, giving the series a more realistic look. For instance, in some shots, pilot Bill Fergusson actually did taxi the 310B rather than the more common (but time-consuming and costly) method of simulating movement by towing or dolly shots. Plymouth provided several 1951 woodie station wagons for the series.

The show was filmed and shown during three periods as sponsors changed: 1951–1952 (Derby Foods), 1955–1956 and 1957–1962 (Nabisco, though the copyright notices continued to name Derby Foods). It continued in syndication for years afterward, and was a staple on Saturday morning television into the mid-1960s.

The musical score was largely the work of composer Herschel Burke Gilbert

Nabisco sold the series complete with all rights to Kirby Grant in 1959. In later years, Grant considered bringing back the series and even a "Sky King" theme park, but nothing ever happened on either of these projects. At least one writer has boilerplated a Sky King film, but none has been produced.

=== Aircraft ===
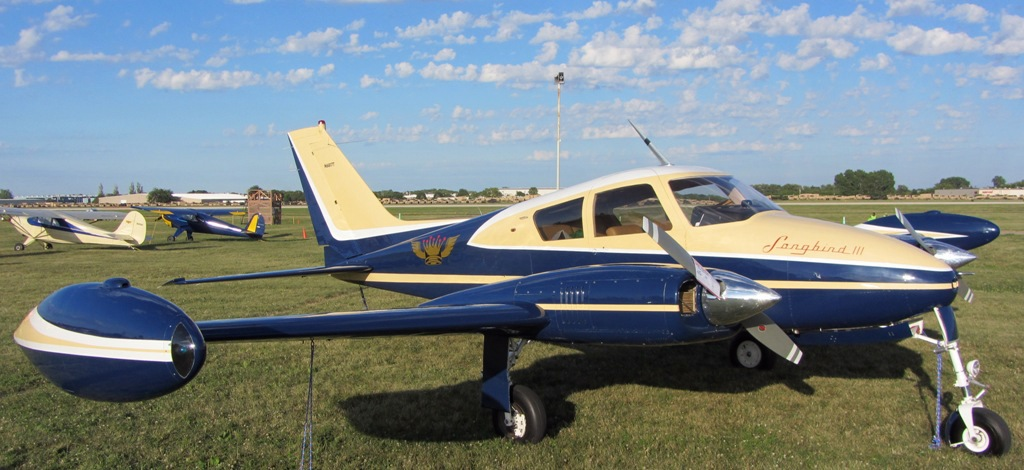
Songbird III, a 1960 Cessna 310D

King originally flew a Cessna T-50 Bobcat, a twin-engine wooden-framed airplane some called the "Bamboo Bomber". The craft was a World War II surplus UC-78B, owned by legendary Hollywood pilot Paul Mantz and flown by employees of his Paul Mantz Aerial Services for filming the flying sequences. At least two other T-50s are known to have been used for on-ground and in-the-cockpit scenes. The T-50 was grounded after episode 39 due to rot in the wooden frame. Songbird I was de-registered by the FAA in March 2018.

The best-known Songbird was a 1957 twin-engine Cessna 310B used in episodes 40 through 72. It was the second production 310B (tail number N5348A), provided by Cessna at no cost to the producers and piloted by Cessna's national sales manager for the 310, Bill Fergusson. Fergusson got the job after the motion picture pilot already selected was deemed unqualified to land the airplane at some of the off-airport sites required. Some months after a library of stock footage had been compiled, additional sequences were filmed using a different airplane. Cockpit sequences were filmed using the static test fuselage, also provided by Cessna. The original 310B was eventually destroyed in a crash at Delano, California, in 1962, which killed its owner-pilot. A 1962 310D took its place. A third 310, "Song Bird III," was used for publicity photos. It is still flying today, making appearances at airshows in a modified Sky King livery.

The budget issue also forced the frequent reuse of aircraft stock footage, sometimes "flopped" (i.e., reversing the flight position) in post-production, to show airplanes banking in the opposite direction. In these cases letters and numbers (especially wing and tail numbers) read backwards.

The monotone black-and-white film disguised the actual color scheme of the Cessna 310B, which was painted in a rich multi-color pattern of Coronado Yellow, Sierra Gold, and White, with a gold interior.

As opposed to rear projection showing the sky outside of the mockup airplane's windows, the show utilised scrim on a metal frame with clouds painted on it that would be rolled past the cockpit windows. Hagerthy claimed that if the scene was long, the same clouds would pass by in the other direction.

== Release ==
=== Broadcast ===
The television show was first broadcast on Sunday afternoons on NBC-TV between September 16, 1951, and October 26, 1952. These episodes were rebroadcast on ABC's Saturday morning lineup the following year from November 8, 1952 through September 21, 1953 when it made its prime-time debut on ABC's Monday night lineup. It was telecast twice a week in August and September 1954, before ABC cancelled it. New episodes were produced when the show went into syndication in 1955. The last new episode, "Mickey's Birthday", was telecast March 8, 1959. Thereafter, Sky King surfaced on the CBS Saturday schedule in reruns until September, 1966.

=== Syndication ===
CBS began airing reruns of the show on early Saturday afternoons (at 12 pm Eastern/Pacific times; late Saturday mornings at 11 am Central/Mountain times) on October 3, 1959, and continued to do so until September 3, 1966. The CBS reruns were sponsored by Nabisco.

=== Home media ===
All 72 episodes of the TV series have been released on DVD in North America, available from Sky King Productions.
