= Linda Smith (musician) =

Home recording singer-songwriter

Linda Smith is an American singer-songwriter, multi-instrumentalist, and home recording artist who began self-releasing cassette albums in the late 1980s. Beginning in the 1990s, some of her recordings were released in vinyl and CD form on indie labels such as Slumberland Records and Harriet Records. In 2021, the Captured Tracks label reissued a selection of her recordings on an album called Till Another Time: 1988–1996. Paste Magazine described the release as a "hidden treasure of America’s pop underground."

In the 1980s, prior to her solo career, Smith was in a New York City band called the Woods. In the 1990s, she was a member of the Silly Pillows, appearing as a vocalist on one album with the band. Other bands that included Smith were the Window Shoppers and Yours Truly.

Smith is a longtime resident of Baltimore.

== Discography ==
- The Space Between the Buildings (MC) – Preference – 1987
- Do You Know the Way...? (MC) – Preference – 1988
- "Gorgeous Weather" (7") – Harriet – 1990
- Put It in Writing (MC) – Preference – 1991
- "Till Another Time" (7") – Slumberland – 1993
- Remember Your Heart (EP) – Hoppel di Hoy – 1993
- Nothing Else Matters (CD) – Feel Good All Over – 1995; (LP) – Captured Tracks – 2024
- I So Liked Spring (MC) – Shrimper – 1996; (LP) – Captured Tracks – 2024
- Preference: Selected Songs, 1987–1991 (CD) – Harriet – 1997
- Emily's House (CD) – Preference – 2001
- Something New! (CD) – Preference – 2001
- All the Stars That Never Were (MC) – Juniper Tree Songs – 2014
- Till Another Time: 1988–1996 (CD) – Captured Tracks – 2021
- Untitled 1–10 Plus 1 (LP) – Almost Halloween Time – 2021
