= Popular (Nada Surf song) =

1996 single by Nada Surf

Single by Nada Surf

from the album High/Low
- B-side: "Pressure Free"; "Oh No"; "Psychic Caramel"
- Released: May 1996
- Studio: Electric Lady (Greenwich Village, New York City)
- Genre: Alternative rock; spoken word; noise pop; post-grunge
- Length: 3:36
- Label: Elektra
- Songwriters: Matthew Caws; Daniel Lorca; Gloria Winters
- Producer: Ric Ocasek

Nada Surf singles chronology
| "Popular" (1996) | "Treehouse" (1996) |

Music video
- "Popular" on YouTube

"Popular" is the debut single by American alternative rock band Nada Surf, released in May 1996 from their debut album High/Low, released the following month. Each verse in "Popular" presents, in spoken-word format, sarcastic advice to teenagers taken from the book Penny's Guide to Teen-Age Charm and Popularity by American actress Gloria Winters.

"Popular" reached number 11 on the US Billboard Modern Rock Tracks chart. It was also a hit in Iceland, topping the country's chart for two weeks, and in France, where it reached number 10 and received a gold certification for sales of over 250,000. The song additionally reached the top 40 in New Zealand, Sweden, and the Wallonia region of Belgium.

== Background and release ==
The whole song, except for the chorus, are parts made up from the 1964 teen advice book Penny's Guide to Teen-Age Charm and Popularity, written by Gloria Winters. The excerpts are spoken in a sarcastic tone by Matthew Caws.

"Popular" proved to be Nada Surf's most successful single. The song was originally scheduled to be serviced to US alternative radio on June 10, 1996, but its growing popularity prompted Elektra Records to move the release date forward to May 1996. After the release of their first album, Caws explained, "After the attention from 'Popular' died down, people seemed to get the impression that we'd somehow fallen from grace."

Nada Surf continue to perform the song live despite the stylistic difference from the band's later material. Caws commented in 2012, "We've tried playing 'Popular' at concerts now. If we don't play it, someone is grumpy. If we do play it, someone else is grumpy. We can't win."

== Music video ==
The music video for the song, directed by Jesse Peretz, was shot at Bayonne High School, with administration approval, and showed football players and cheerleaders, wearing the uniforms of the school, as well as the three members of the band, Matthew as a teacher, Daniel as a security guard, and Ira as the football coach. The video was styled by Andrea Linett, a former editor at Sassy magazine, who went on to be the founding creative director of Lucky magazine.

The plot consists of a female cheerleader taking the teacher's lesson on popularity literally by two-timing two football players behind their backs, under the notion that she deserves "every boy in the whole world" by following that teacher's "teenage guide to popularity". The cheerleader in the music video was portrayed by then 18-year-old Sarah Sebestyen, a student at the time at Professional Children's School in Manhattan.

== Track listings ==
European and Australia CD single

1. "Popular" – 3:36
2. "Pressure Free" – 2:32
3. "Oh No" – 2:08

Australian CD single with slipcase

1. "Popular"
2. "Psychic Caramel"

== Credits and personnel ==
Credits are adapted from the European-Australian CD single liner notes.

Studio

- Recorded at Electric Lady Studios (Greenwich Village, New York City)

Personnel

- Matthew Caws – writing
- Daniel Lorca – writing
- Ric Ocasek – production
- Catherine Talese – Popularspeak
- Bruce Calder – engineering
- George Marino – mastering
- Jim deBarros – art direction and design
- John Kelsey – cover photo

== Charts ==
=== Weekly charts ===
| Chart (1996) | Peak position |
|---|---|
| Australia (ARIA) | 43 |
| Belgium (Ultratip Bubbling Under Flanders) | 7 |
| Belgium (Ultratop 50 Wallonia) | 21 |
| Canada Rock/Alternative (RPM) | 13 |
| Europe (Eurochart Hot 100) | 36 |
| France (SNEP) | 10 |
| Iceland (Íslenski Listinn Topp 40) | 1 |
| Netherlands (Single Top 100) | 54 |
| New Zealand (Recorded Music NZ) | 40 |
| Sweden (Sverigetopplistan) | 13 |
| UK Singles (OCC) | 123 |
| US Radio Songs (Billboard) | 51 |
| US Alternative Airplay (Billboard) | 11 |

=== Year-end charts ===
| Chart (1996) | Position |
|---|---|
| France (SNEP) | 85 |
| Sweden (Topplistan) | 72 |
| US Modern Rock Tracks (Billboard) | 65 |

== Certifications ==
| Region | Certification | Certified units/sales |
|---|---|---|
| France (SNEP) | Gold | 250,000^{*} |
^{*} Sales figures based on certification alone.

== Release history ==
| Region | Date | Format(s) | Label(s) | Ref. |
|---|---|---|---|---|
| United States | May 1996 | Alternative radio | Elektra | |
| United States | July 30, 1996 | Contemporary hit radio | Elektra | |
| Europe | August 1996 | Radio | Elektra | |
| United Kingdom | September 1996 | Radio | Elektra | |
| France | September 26, 1996 | CD | Elektra | |
| United Kingdom | October 14, 1996 | CD; cassette | Elektra | |
| United Kingdom | February 17, 1997 (re-release) | CD; cassette | Elektra | |

== Pom Pom Squad version ==
In December 2021, indie rock band Pom Pom Squad released a cover of "Popular", with Matthew Caws appearing on backing vocals. The accompanying video replicated the 1996 video, with Pom Pom Squad's Mia Berrin playing each of the major characters. The video was filmed at the same location as Nada Surf's video.
