= If I Had a Hi-Fi =

Studio album of cover songs by Nada Surf
- Released: June 8, 2010
- Recorded: 2009–2010
- Studio: various
- Genre: Indie rock
- Length: 41:09
- Label: Mardev
- Producer: Nada Surf

Nada Surf chronology
Lucky (2008)	If I Had a Hi-Fi (2010)	The Stars Are Indifferent to Astronomy (2012)

If I Had a Hi-Fi is the sixth studio album by American alternative rock band Nada Surf. It was released on June 8, 2010, on Mardev Records. It consists only of covers chosen by the band members themselves.

The album title is a palindrome.

Professional ratings
Aggregate scores
Source	Rating
Metacritic	74/100
Review scores
Source	Rating
AllMusic	3.5/5 stars
Billboard	3.5/5
Drowned in Sound	8/10
Slant Magazine	3/5 stars
Under the Radar	7/10 stars

== Track listing ==
No.	Title	Writer(s)	Original artist	Length
1.	"Electrocution"	Bill Fox	Bill Fox	3:13
2.	"Enjoy the Silence"	Martin Gore	Depeche Mode	3:21
3.	"Love Goes On!"	Grant McLennan, Robert Forster	The Go-Betweens	3:02
4.	"Janine"	Arthur Russell	Arthur Russell	1:04
5.	"You Were So Warm"	Dwight Twilley	Dwight Twilley	2:48
6.	"Love and Anger"	Kate Bush	Kate Bush	4:50
7.	"The Agony of Laffitte"	Britt Daniel	Spoon	3:50
8.	"Bye Bye Beauté"	Benjamin Biolay	Coralie Clément	3:37
9.	"Question"	Justin Hayward	The Moody Blues	5:17
10.	"Bright Side"	Matthew Lamkin, Matty McLoughlin	The Soft Pack	3:06
11.	"Evolution"	Joaquín Pascual	Mercromina	5:10
12.	"I Remembered What I Was Going to Say"	Jonathan Caws-Elwitt	The Silly Pillows	1:52

Vinyl edition bonus tracks
No.	Title	Length
13.	"Conquering Fox" (Lino Mix)	6:34
14.	"Conquering Fox" (Dr. Isreal Mix)	6:15
15.	"Lexicon Dub"

== Personnel ==
- Matthew Caws – vocals, guitar
- Daniel Lorca – bass guitar, vocals
- Ira Elliot – drums, vocals

Additional personnel

- Doug Gillard – guitar
- Joe McGinty – keyboards
- Louie Lino – programming
- Philip Peterson & Victoria Parker – string arrangements

Mixed by

- Joe Agnello at Head Gear, Brooklyn on 1, 5 & 10
- John Goodmanson at Bogroll, Seattle on 2, 3, 6, 9 & 11
- Louie Lino at Resonate, Austin on 4, 7, & 12
- Tom Beaujour at Nuthouse, Hoboken on 8

Mastered by George Marino at Sterling Sound, assisted by Ryan Smith.
