= Karmic (EP) =

EP by Nada Surf
- Released: 19 March 1996
- Genre: Alternative rock
- Length: 14:15
- Label: No.6 Records

Nada Surf chronology
Karmic (1996)	High/Low (1996)

Karmic is the debut EP from American rock band Nada Surf, released in 1996. It was recorded in 1993 and 1994. The song "Treehouse" appeared on the band's first album High/Low. In 2007, Karmic was reissued under the Hi-Speed Soul label with bonus track "Pressure Free".

== Track listing ==
1. "Telescope" – 3:04
2. "Sea Knows When" – 3:37
3. "Everybody Lies" – 2:22
4. "Treehouse" – 2:41
5. "Nothing" – 2:31
