= The Mice (band) =

American power-pop band (1984–1988)

- Origin: Cleveland, Ohio, United States
- Genres: Power pop
- Years active: 1984–1988
- Labels: Mouse Tunes, Herb Jackson, St. Valentine, What Goes On, Scat
- Past members: Bill Fox; Tommy Fox; Ken Hall

The Mice were a Cleveland-based rock trio active in the mid-1980s, led by vocalist/guitarist and songwriter Bill Fox. Allmusic described them as "cult legends and mid '80s purveyors of deliriously hooky and energetic power pop."

== History ==
=== Formation and For Almost Ever ===
Bill Fox and his brother, drummer Tommy Fox, played with Bill's high school friends and performed music in various minor and untitled lineups. Together with a friend who would not end up in the band's final lineup, two recordings were made which appeared on a self-released ("Mouse Tunes") 500-copy 7" single, Can You Walk on the Water Baby? An ad was placed in the newspaper that read closely to "Mice seek bassist. No metalheads!" and after the responses came in, Bill Fox chose bassist Ken Hall to complete the trio's lineup.

The six-song For Almost Ever EP was recorded in July 1985 and released later that year on the small indie label, Herb Jackson Records. In a contemporary review of the EP, Option remarked that "the Mice might be favorably compared to the Replacements, bearing the same sort of unformed rock 'n roll raggedness while cranking out Brit-Invasion influenced songs. In fact, the melodies here are more instantly catchy than most of the Replacements' recent output. Six songs, not a turkey among 'em."

The Bob also offered a positive review of For Almost Ever, describing it as "rock as it's meant to be, or at least rock as the '60s shaped it, which is how I think it's meant to be. Music for and by kids; gloriously innocent and amateurish and all that. This band really cooks."

In a retrospective review, The Village Voice described For Almost Ever as "six shockingly fresh-faced blasts," adding that "the undeniable teen energy (liner notes [to the For Almost Ever Scooter reissue] say that Bill's drummer brother Tommy was 15 at the time) is belied by Fox's masterful handling of melody and some particularly astute harmonic and instrumental choices." Trouser Press, also in a retrospective review, called For Almost Ever "a near-perfect rush of giddy, catchy, explosive rock, casting shades of the Who, the Only Ones, Buzzcocks, Jam, and Beatles with the exuberance of a five-year-old who just got his first bicycle for Christmas."

For Almost Ever included the song "Not Proud of the USA", which The Believer later dubbed "a charging power pop anthem." The song would receive considerable airplay years later on free-form station WFMU during the Bush presidential administration.

=== Scooter, breakup, and posthumous releases ===
Scooter, a full-length LP, followed a year later on the St. Valentine record label. It was also released in the United Kingdom on the What Goes On label. A review of Scooter in Option was less glowing than the magazine's previous one for For Almost Ever, stating that "though catchy, the songs are rather same-sounding. Jangling guitars and nice treble harmonies come from this young-looking trio, but the songs don't seem to really go anywhere. It nevertheless has the ring of a sincere effort."

Maximum Rocknroll described Scooter as "less overtly 'punk' than [For Almost Ever], this album contains ten pop-punky tunes with the emphasis on pop, in a style reminiscent of early Shoes. Undeniably catchy, this record is best when guitars take precedence, but there's still a good deal here for fans of cool pop music – though the style does wear thin after a while."

The Village Voice wrote that Scooter "progresses more in terms of sound rather than attitude," when compared to For Almost Ever. Singling out Scooter's "Bye Bye Kitty Kat," the reviewer dubbed it "as bitter a breakup kiss-off as you'll hear."

On the morning the Mice were set to depart on an American and European tour, the band broke up, abandoning their new LP in-progress, Canterbury Bells. Bill Fox went on to release a number of solo recordings in the decades ahead on labels like Scat Records, SpinART and Eleventh Hour.

In August 2004, Scat Records released For Almost Ever Scooter, a compact disc which compiled For Almost Ever and Scooter. That same month, Scat issued Unreleased & Live Recordings in a limited run on CD-R. It gathered nine completed songs from the Canterbury Bells session (eventually mixed in 2002), an outtake from Scooter ("Resurrection Day"), the "Can You Walk on the Water, Baby?" single, and selections from a live performance recorded on June 4, 1988 for WRUW.

== Legacy ==
Pitchfork referred to the Mice as "a short-lived but well-loved band [...] whose brand of catchy, acerbic power pop inspired Elliott Smith and fellow Buckeyes Guided by Voices."

Bandcamp Daily, writing in 2025, noted that the Mice "remain a crucial piece of American underground music history" and that "Not Proud of the USA" "sounds just as relevant in today's political climate as when it was written."

Trouser Press observed that "despite being heard by almost no one during their brief existence, the Cleveland trio influenced indie big shots like Guided by Voices and Superchunk with stunningly good adrenalized power pop records that few ’80s bands could match."

Scooter's "Bye Bye Kitty Cat" was covered by Superchunk on Clambakes Vol. 8: We’d Like To Thank The Homecoming Committee – Live At Duke 1997, a live album made available as a download for those who purchased the 2014 Merge Records reissue of Indoor Living. The live album was subsequently made available for streaming.

== Discography ==
- "Can You Walk on the Water Baby?" / "Little Creatures" (Self-released Mouse Tunes, 1984)
- For Almost Ever (Herb Jackson, 1985)
- Scooter (St. Valentine Records, 1986)
- "Little Rage" (The Mice) / "House Fall Down" (Yo La Tengo) (What Goes On Records, 1987)
- Jim Clevo Presents – Listen (cassette compilation, Label Unknown, 1987)
- For Almost Ever Scooter (Scat Records, 2004)
- Unreleased and Live Recordings (Scat Records, 2004)
