= High/Low (album) =

1996 studio album by Nada Surf

Studio album by Nada Surf
- Released: June 18, 1996
- Recorded: December 1–20, 1995
- Studios: Electric Lady, New York City
- Genres: Alternative rock, power pop
- Length: 36:31
- Label: Elektra
- Producer: Ric Ocasek

Nada Surf chronology
High/Low (1996)	The Proximity Effect (1998)

High/Low is the debut studio album by the American band Nada Surf, released in 1996. It contains the hit single "Popular". High/Low was produced by Ric Ocasek. Nada Surf supported it by touring with Superdrag and the Gravel Pit.

== Critical reception ==
Professional ratings
Review scores
Source	Rating
AllMusic	3/5 stars
Chicago Tribune	3/4 stars
Christgau's Consumer Guide	(dud)
The Encyclopedia of Popular Music	3/5 stars
Entertainment Weekly	B−
Pitchfork	7.4/10

The Baltimore Sun noted that "there's an almost elegant austerity to the album's sound, but what ultimately brings the songs into focus is the band's ultra-efficient playing, which is so sparing you'd think the recording studio charged them by the note." The Ottawa Citizen concluded that Nada Surf "may have been moulded by a superior studio presence, but the root of their sound, guitar-driven and heavy on the backbeat, speaks of an energy that was harnessed and focused, not manufactured."

== Track listing ==
All tracks written by Matthew Caws and Daniel Lorca, except where noted.

1. "Deeper Well" – 3:55 - written by Caws, Lorca and Robert Randall
2. "The Plan" – 4:31
3. "Popular" – 3:48 - written by Caws, Lorca and Gloria Winters
4. "Sleep" – 3:47
5. "Stalemate" – 3:38
6. "Treehouse" – 2:43
7. "Icebox" – 3:17
8. "Psychic Caramel" – 4:00
9. "Hollywood" – 2:20
10. "Zen Brain" – 4:28

== Personnel ==
Nada Surf

- Matthew Caws – guitar, vocals
- Daniel Lorca – bass
- Ira Elliot – drums

Production

- Bruce Calder – engineer, mixer
- George Marino – mastering
- Ric Ocasek – producer
- Andy Salas – assistant engineer

== Charts ==
Album

Year	Chart	Peak position
1996	Billboard 200	63

Singles

Year	Song	Chart	Position
1996	"Popular"	Billboard Modern Rock Tracks	11
