= The Weight Is a Gift =

Studio album by Nada Surf
- Released: September 20, 2005
- Recorded: 2005
- Studio: Hall of Justice, Seattle; Tiny Telephone, San Francisco
- Genre: Alternative rock
- Length: 44:17
- Label: Barsuk
- Producer: Chris Walla, Louie Lino, Nada Surf

Nada Surf chronology
Let Go (2002)	The Weight Is a Gift (2005)	Lucky (2008)

Singles from The Weight Is a Gift
- 1. "Always Love" Released: 2005; 2. "Imaginary Friends" Released: 2005

Professional ratings
Aggregate scores
Source	Rating
Metacritic	73/100 link
Review scores
Source	Rating
AbsolutePunk	87% link
AllMusic	link
Entertainment Weekly	B link
Pitchfork Media	6.4/10 21 Sep 05
Rolling Stone	22 Sep 05

The Weight Is a Gift is the fourth album by American alternative rock band Nada Surf. It was released via Barsuk Records in 2005.

== Recording ==
The album was produced by Death Cab for Cutie guitarist Chris Walla and mixed by Geoff Sanoff, John Goodmanson, John Agnello and Ed Stasium. Tom Beaujour did some guitar overdubs. The album features vocals from the Long Winters frontman John Roderick. It was recorded in two sessions at Hall of Justice in Seattle and Tiny Telephone Studios in San Francisco.

== Release ==
The album was met with moderate success and favorable reviews. Critic Marc Hogan of Pitchfork wrote that the album is "another often-compelling set of melancholic post-Coldplay guitar-pop, made grittily optimistic by the tribulations of post-hipster existence".

In August 2006, Nada Surf appeared at the Lollapalooza festival.

== Details ==
The song "Always Love" was featured in the 2007 film Disturbia.

According to NPR's program All Songs Considered, the band says the album "answers questions of lust and deception, greed and love, joy and regret and the rites of passage you weren't quite ready to pass through." In another interview, Matthew Caws described the imagery in the song "Your Legs Grow", saying: "When a challenge presents itself to you, it is so easy to have a kind of panicky feeling where you think, 'Oh my god – if that happened to me, I would die. If I have to stay in this job I'll die, or if I lose that person, I'll die.' And once in a while, those things you think will kill you happen. You know, someone breaks up with you, or one of your parents gets really sick or something. But you make it through anything, really. And the image that was in my mind was that if you were out at sea, and you were freezing and thought you were going to drown – somehow we have the capacity to get over anything and the image that I had in mind was that your legs would just grow down to the bottom and you'd walk out. We are capable of rescuing ourselves. I was holding onto that thought or being hopeful about it, since I was going through a hard time in a relationship."

== Track listing ==
All tracks written by Matthew Caws, Daniel Lorca and Ira Elliot, except where noted.

1. "Concrete Bed" – 2:29
2. "Do It Again" – 3:39
3. "Always Love" – 3:18
4. "What Is Your Secret?" – 3:26
5. "Your Legs Grow" – 4:00
6. "All Is a Game" – 3:26
7. "Blankest Year" – 2:12
8. "Comes a Time" – 4:58
9. "In the Mirror" – 3:41
10. "Armies Walk" – 3:28
11. "Imaginary Friends" – 4:44
12. "Untitled Instrumental" (hidden track) – 1:57

=== Bonus disc ===
Many albums included a four-track bonus disc.

1. "From the Rooftop Down" – 2:44
2. "Fools" (Peter Perrett) – 2:54
3. "Concrete Bed (Original Version)" – 2:10
4. "Au fond du rêve doré" (Françoise Hardy) – 2:05
