= Ron Hagerthy =

American television actor (born 1932)

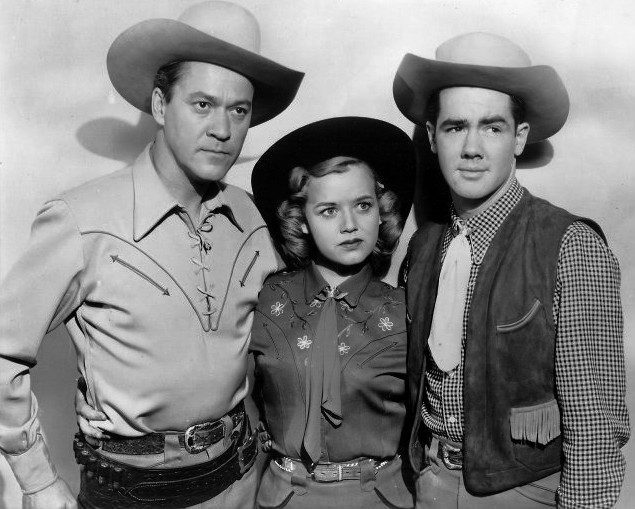
- Hagerthy at right with Kirby Grant and Gloria Winters in Sky King.
- Born: March 9, 1932 (age 94); Aberdeen, South Dakota, U.S.
- Occupation: Actor
- Spouse: Patti Taylor

Ronald F. Hagerthy (born March 9, 1932) is an American actor on television and in films.

== Early years ==
Hagerthy was born in Aberdeen, South Dakota, but moved to Glendale, California, before he started school. He attended Glendale City College and once worked as an ambulance driver. His acting career was interrupted by two years' service in the Army.

== Career ==
On television, in the 1950s, Hagerthy portrayed Clipper King (nephew of the title character) in the modern Western series, Sky King. He also appeared on Matinee Theater, Bonanza, Gunsmoke (as "Blackie" in S1E38's "Unknown Grave" – 1956), Navy Log, Tales of Wells Fargo, and New Comedy Showcase. He also appeared in an episode of Death Valley Days as Felix Bridger, son of mountain man Jim Bridger played by Harry Shannon (1958) and an episode of The Rifleman, "The Deserter" (March 15, 1960, S2E25).

On film, Hagerthy portrayed Dick Cvetic in I Was a Communist for the FBI (1951) and Cpl. Rich Williams in Starlift (1951). He also appeared in Make Haste to Live (1954), Eighteen and Anxious (1957), The Charge at Feather River (1953), City That Never Sleeps (1953), and Force of Arms (1951).

== Personal life ==
Hagerthy married Patti Taylor, who was his sweetheart from his school days.
