= Gloria Winters =

American actress (1931–2010)

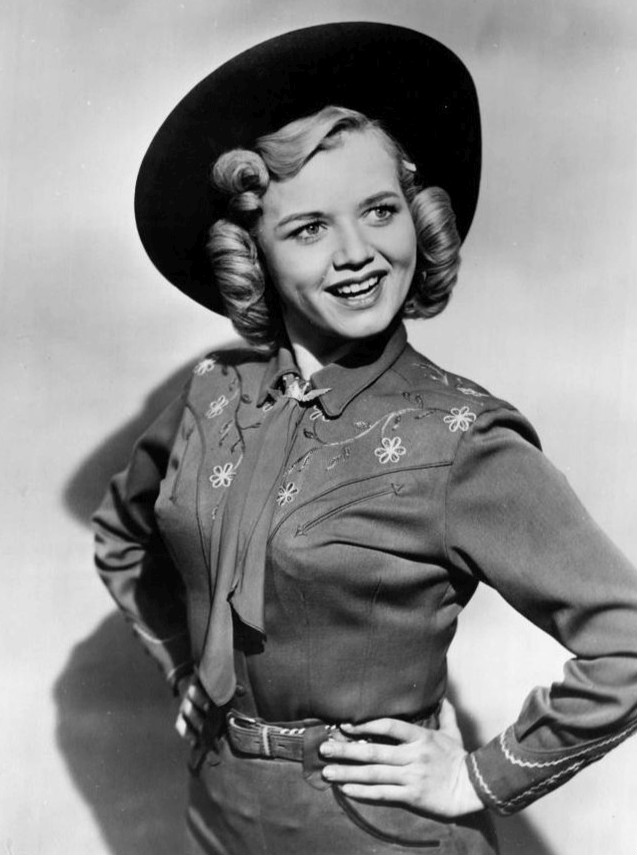
- Winters as Penny King (1952)
- Born: Gloria Carolyn Hirst; November 28, 1931; Los Angeles, California, U.S.
- Died: August 14, 2010 (aged 78); Vista, California, U.S.
- Resting place: Fort Rosecrans National Cemetery, San Diego, California, U.S.
- Occupations: Actress; author
- Spouse: Dean Stevens Vernon

Gloria Winters (November 28, 1931 – August 14, 2010) was an American actress most notable for having portrayed the niece, Penny King, in the 1950s Western television series Sky King.

== Biography ==
=== Early life and career ===
Winters was born Gloria Carolyn Hirst in Los Angeles on November 28, 1931. She grew up in the San Fernando Valley of Los Angeles, and later moved to Hollywood with her family. A child actress, she made her debut, she said in a mid-2000s radio interview, "when I was about five", with a small role in a Shirley Temple movie. "I came running out to Shirley Temple, and she was supposed to help me, like I had just gone to the little girls' room."

Winters went on to a Pete Smith movie short, in a scene of her coming down a slide to the grass, where a black Scottie dog licked her face. She also appeared in an Our Gang feature. She performed onstage, and took tap dance classes, and in the late 1940s and early 1950s was first cast in Western films such as Driftwood (1947) and El Paso (1949), and in such television series as The Lone Ranger, The Range Rider and The Gene Autry Show. Her roughly twenty films, mostly Westerns, include The Lawless (1950) and Gambling House (1951).

She portrayed daughter Babs Riley in the first season of the NBC sitcom The Life of Riley (1949–1950), starring Jackie Gleason and Rosemary DeCamp.

=== Sky King ===
Winters' signature role was in the television drama Sky King, starring Kirby Grant as rancher and pilot Schuyler "Sky" King in Arizona of the 1950s. Winters played the blonde, baby-faced, perky but earnest, and helpful teenage niece, Penny King, who lived with her uncle at the Flying Crown Ranch and often became involved in his varied adventures. She played the role in seventy-two episodes from 1952 to 1959. Ron Hagerthy appeared in nineteen episodes during 1952 as Sky King's nephew and Penny's brother, Clipper. Sky King ran on NBC and ABC, and was filmed from 1951 to 1952 and from 1955 through at least 1959, as sponsors changed. It ran after that in syndication, but the actors received no residuals.

During the run of Sky King, Winters and Kirby Grant performed as a song-and-dance team as headliners on the state fair circuit. Winters recalled a State Fair of Texas in Dallas in which the two signed autographs. Waiting for their signatures were astronauts Gus Grissom, Pete Conrad, Alan Shepard, and Wally Schirra in line with their children. As the magazine publisher Airport Journal noted, the series Sky King inspired several youngsters to take up flying when they became older.

Winters married Dean Stevens Vernon, a sound engineer on Sky King, and gave up acting following a 1960 appearance on Hugh O'Brian's ABC western series, The Life and Legend of Wyatt Earp.

=== Other roles ===
In the interim, Winters had guest roles in series, including the anthology Death Valley Days, The Jack Benny Program, Richard Diamond, Private Detective; Racket Squad; The Gene Autry Show, in which she made her singing debut in the 1951 episode "Warning! Danger!", The Adventures of Wild Bill Hickok, Brave Eagle, Four Star Playhouse, General Electric Theater, Frontier Doctor, Judge Roy Bean (in the episode "Four Ladies from Laredo"), The Roy Rogers Show, and Sheriff of Cochise.

On Jim Davis' Stories of the Century anthology series, Winters played the teenaged bandit Little Britches, opposite James Best as the outlaw Dave Ridley, with whom she is smitten.

During this time, Winters appeared in movies, including Hold That Line (1952), starring the Bowery Boys, and She Couldn't Say No.

== Later life ==
In 1964, Winters wrote Penny's Guide to Teen-Age Charm and Popularity (published by Prentice Hall), an etiquette book aimed at young girls, which later inspired the alternative rock band Nada Surf's 1996 song and video "Popular." As well, Jimmy Buffett's song "Pencil Thin Mustache" contains a reminiscence about being "bucktoothed and skinny ... writin' fan letters to Sky's niece Penny."

When her husband retired, the two moved to Vista, California. He died in 2001, and Winters succumbed nine years later of complications from pneumonia at her home. She was survived by her sister-in-law Phyllis DeCinces and was interred alongside her husband at the Fort Rosecrans National Cemetery in San Diego.

== Awards ==
In 2002, she was awarded the Motion Picture & Television Fund's Golden Boot Award for her work in Western films and television programs.
