= The Proximity Effect (Nada Surf album) =

Studio album by Nada Surf
- Released: September 22, 1998 (Europe); August, 2000 (North America)
- Recorded: 1998
- Genre: Indie rock
- Length: 53:02
- Label: Elektra; MarDev
- Producer: Fred Maher

Nada Surf chronology
High/Low (1996)	The Proximity Effect (1998)	Let Go (2002)

Professional ratings
Review scores
Source	Rating
AllMusic	3/5 stars
Pitchfork Media	5.1/10
Uncut	1.5/5 stars

The Proximity Effect is the second album by the alternative rock band Nada Surf. It was released by Elektra Records in Europe in 1998, and by MarDev in North America in August 2000.

== Recording ==
Finding no radio-friendly single on the album, Elektra asked the band to write a hit, had them record covers of other artists, and tried to push "Why Are You So Mean To Me?" as the first single. The band refused and, after its release in Europe in September 1998, the band did a 30-show tour in France in early 1999. Elektra dropped the band, initially setting a high purchase price for the rights to the album. The band eventually released the album in the United States via their own label, MarDev, in 2000.

== Critical reception ==
AllMusic concluded that "while there are times where The Proximity Effect tries to break out of the limiting corner of the alt-rock universe it's staked for itself (like the power pop rave-up 'Why Are You So Mean to Me?'), more often than not it returns to the familiar, and assumingly comforting, haven of angst-free pop."

== Track listing ==
=== 1998 Elektra version ===
All tracks are written by Nada Surf, except where noted.

No.	Title	Lyrics	Music	Length
1.	"Hyperspace"			4:36
2.	"Amateur"			4:01
3.	"Why Are You So Mean to Me?" (Vitreous Humor cover)	Danny Pound	Vitreous Humor	4:01
4.	"Mother's Day"			3:47
5.	"Troublemaker"			4:21
6.	"80 Windows"			4:25
7.	"Bacardi"			4:01
8.	"Bad Best Friend"			4:10
9.	"Dispossession"			2:53
10.	"The Voices"			3:28
11.	"Firecracker"			4:49
12.	"Slow Down"			4:12
13.	"Robot"			4:29

=== 2000 MarDev version ===
All tracks are written by Nada Surf.

No.	Title	Length
1.	"Hyperspace"	4:36
2.	"Amateur"	4:01
3.	"80 Windows"	4:25
4.	"Mother's Day"	3:47
5.	"Troublemaker"	4:21
6.	"Bacardi"	4:01
7.	"Bad Best Friend"	4:10
8.	"Dispossession"	2:53
9.	"The Voices"	3:28
10.	"Firecracker"	4:49
11.	"Slow Down"	4:12
12.	"Robot"	4:29
13.	"Spooky"	3:52
14.	"Silent Fighting"	3:50

== Details ==
The album's re-issue has the last two tracks take the place of the cover found on the original release.
