= Never Not Together =

Studio album by Nada Surf
- Released: February 7, 2020
- Length: 42:24
- Label: Barsuk
- Producer: Ian Laughton

Nada Surf chronology
You Know Who You Are (2016)	Never Not Together (2020)	Moon Mirror (2024)

Never Not Together is the ninth studio album by American band Nada Surf. It was released on February 7, 2020, under Barsuk Records.

== Critical reception ==
Professional ratings
Aggregate scores
Source	Rating
Metacritic	80/100
Review scores
Source	Rating
AllMusic	4.5/5 stars
Exclaim!	8/10
The Skinny	3/5 stars

Never Not Together was met with generally favorable reviews from critics. At Metacritic, which assigns a weighted average rating out of 100 to reviews from mainstream publications, it received an average score of 80, based on 9 reviews.

== Track listing ==
Never Not Together track listing
No.	Title	Length
1.	"So Much Love"	4:02
2.	"Come Get Me"	4:52
3.	"Live Learn and Forget"	4:22
4.	"Just Wait"	3:58
5.	"Something I Should Do"	4:32
6.	"Looking for You"	5:52
7.	"Crowded Star"	4:36
8.	"Mathilda"	6:10
9.	"Ride in the Unknown"	4:00
Total length:		42:24

== Charts ==
Chart performance for Never Not Together
Chart (2020)	Peak position
French Albums (SNEP)	135
German Albums (Offizielle Top 100)	49
Spanish Albums (Promusicae)	41
Swiss Albums (Schweizer Hitparade)	63
UK Independent Albums (OCC)	34
US Top Album Sales (Billboard)	44
