= Let Go (Nada Surf album) =

Studio album by Nada Surf
- Released: September 17, 2002 (Europe); February 4, 2003 (U.S.)
- Recorded: 2001–2002 at Standard Electrical Recorders
- Genre: Alternative rock
- Length: 52:23
- Label: Barsuk
- Producer: Nada Surf, Chris Fudurich, Louie Lino

Nada Surf chronology
The Proximity Effect (1999)	Let Go (2002)	The Weight Is a Gift (2005)

Singles from Album
- 1. "The Way You Wear Your Head" Released: 2002; 2. "Inside of Love" Released: 2002; 3. "Hi-Speed Soul" Released: 2003

Let Go is the third album by alternative rock band, Nada Surf. It was released on Barsuk in 2002.

== Reception ==
Professional ratings
Aggregate scores
Source	Rating
Metacritic	80/100
Review scores
Source	Rating
AllMusic	4.5/5 stars
Alternative Press	4/5
Blender	3/5 stars
Drowned in Sound	8/10
Entertainment Weekly	A−
No Ripcord	7/10
Pitchfork	3.8/10
Q	4/5 stars
Rolling Stone	4/5 stars
Stylus Magazine	3.5/10

Let Go was met with generally favourable reviews from music critics. At Metacritic, which assigns a normalized rating out of 100 to reviews from mainstream publications, the album received an average score of 80, based on 11 reviews. Entertainment Weekly raved, "A dozen near-perfect pop songs, each one teeming with joyful desperation". Let Go reached No. 31 on Billboard's Top Independent Albums chart, and the single for "Inside of Love" reached No. 73 in the UK Singles Chart.

== Details ==
The album was released with at least two different track lineups, not to mention at least one variation that included bonus tracks. Aside from the track ordering, only one track differs between the two track listings given below. The track “Blonde on Blonde” was featured in the opening credits to the 2004 coming-of-age film Summer Storm (Sommersturm), and other songs from Let Go are occasionally heard in TV commercials and on more obscure radio stations. A brief snippet of "Neither Heaven Nor Space" can be heard in the opening few minutes of the 2006 documentary, The Bridge. "Inside of Love" was used in an episode of Wonderfalls, but it went unaired. The song was later used in an episode of How I Met Your Mother, One Tree Hill (Season 1, Episode "Hanging by a Moment") and Hawaii Five-0 and from there gained a larger following.

== Track listing (U.S. version) ==
All songs written by Matthew Caws, Ira Elliot and Daniel Lorca.

1. "Blizzard of '77"
2. "Happy Kid"
3. "Inside of Love"
4. "Fruit Fly"
5. "Blonde on Blonde"
6. "Hi-Speed Soul"
7. "Killian's Red"
8. "The Way You Wear Your Head"
9. "Neither Heaven nor Space" ++
10. "Là Pour Ça"
11. "Treading Water"
12. "Paper Boats"

++ Only included on American release.

== Track listing (European version) ==
1. "Blizzard of '77"
2. "The Way You Wear Your Head"
3. "Fruit Fly"
4. "Blonde on Blonde"
5. "Inside of Love"
6. "Hi-Speed Soul"
7. "No Quick Fix" ++
8. "Killian's Red"
9. "Là Pour Ça"
10. "Happy Kid"
11. "Treading Water"
12. "Paper Boats"
13. "Run" (limited edition bonus track)
14. "Neither Heaven Nor Space" (limited edition bonus track)
15. "End Credits" (limited edition bonus track)

++ Only available on the European release.
