= You Know Who You Are (Nada Surf album) =

Studio album by Nada Surf
- Released: March 4, 2016
- Recorded: 2015
- Studios: Nuthouse Recording, Hoboken, NJ
- Length: 40:48
- Labels: Barsuk, City Slang
- Producers: Tom Beaujour & Nada Surf

Nada Surf chronology
The Stars Are Indifferent to Astronomy (2012)	You Know Who You Are (2016)	Never Not Together (2020)

Professional ratings
Aggregate scores
Source	Rating
Metacritic	71/100
Review scores
Source	Rating
The 405	8/10
Mojo	4/5 stars
Paste	92/100
Uncut	4/5 stars

You Know Who You Are is the eighth studio album by alternative rock band Nada Surf. It was released on the Barsuk record label on March 4, 2016.

Two songs were co-written with Dan Wilson of the band Semisonic.

== Accolades ==
Publication	Accolade	Year	Rank
Mojo	The 50 Best Albums of 2016	2016	49

== Track listing ==
1. "Cold to See Clear" - 4:04
2. "Believe You're Mine" - 4:35
3. "Friend Hospital" - 4:57
4. "New Bird" - 3:02
5. "Out of the Dark" - 3:44
6. "Rushing" - 4:05
7. "Animal" - 5:14
8. "You Know Who You Are" - 2:22
9. "Gold Sounds" - 4:56
10. "Victory's Yours" - 3:46

mixed by:

- Chris Shaw at Double Dog studios on 1.
- John Agnello assisted by Gabriel Bento at Water Music on 2, 3, 6, 7 & 9.
- John Goodmanson at Studio Bogroll on 4, 5, 8 & 10.

mastered by Chris Athens in Austin, TX.

Personnel:

- Matthew Caws - vocals, guitar
- Daniel Lorca - bass guitar
- Ira Elliot - drums & percussion
- Doug Gillard - guitar

additionel:

- Joe McGinty - keyboards
- Ken Stringfellow - background vocals
- Martin Wenk - trumpet
- Dan Wilson - background vocals

== Charts ==
Chart (2016)	Peak position
Austrian Albums (Ö3 Austria)	51
Swiss Albums (Schweizer Hitparade)	46
