= Nada Surf =

American rock band

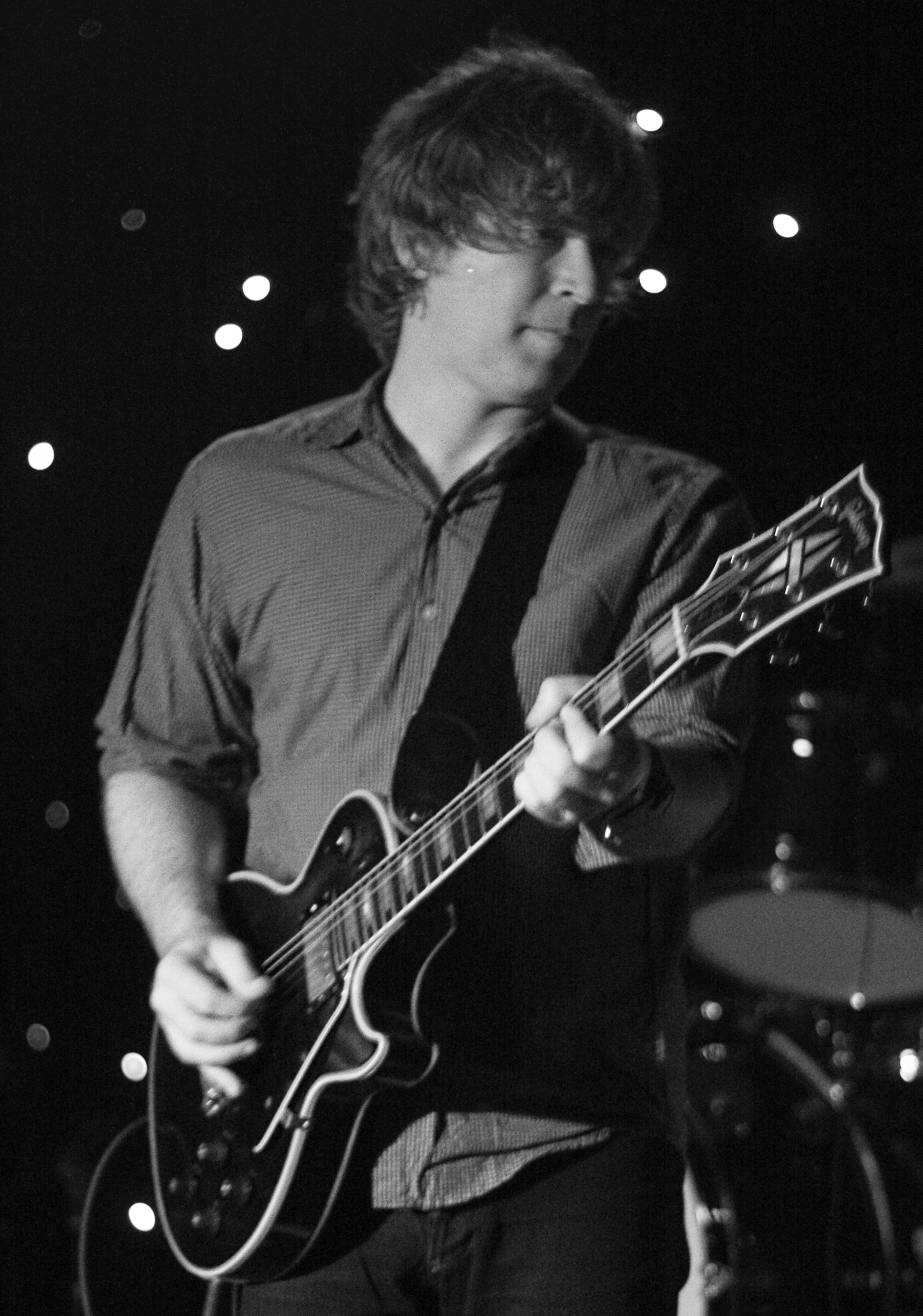
- Frontman Matthew Caws in 2008

Background information
- Origin: New York City, US
- Genres: Alternative rock; indie rock; power pop
- Years active: 1992–present
- Labels: Heavenly (UK), City Slang (GER), Barsuk, Elektra, New West
- Members: Matthew Caws; Daniel Lorca; Ira Elliot; Louie Lino
- Past members: Aaron Conte
- Website: nadasurf.com

Nada Surf is an American alternative rock band formed in New York City in 1992, consisting of Matthew Caws (guitar, vocals), Ira Elliot (drums), and Daniel Lorca (bass, backing vocals).

After initially operating under the name Helicopter, Caws and Lorca switched to Nada Surf. In 1995, Ira Elliot joined on drums, and they met Ric Ocasek, former frontman of the Cars, who produced their debut album, High/Low, in 1996. Despite experiencing significant success with their single "Popular" and touring extensively, their follow-up album, The Proximity Effect, was not well received by their record label, Elektra, resulting in the band being dropped, and they self-released the album.

Throughout the early 2000s, members worked regular day jobs while continuing to create music, leading to the release of the critically acclaimed album Let Go, in 2002. Their subsequent albums included The Weight Is a Gift (2005), Lucky (2008), the covers album If I Had a Hi-Fi (2010), and The Stars Are Indifferent to Astronomy (2012). They issued their eighth studio album, You Know Who You Are, in 2016, and followed it with Never Not Together in 2020. Their tenth studio album, Moon Mirror, was released in September 2024.

== History ==
=== 1990s ===
Nada Surf was formed in 1992 by Matthew Caws and Daniel Lorca. They originally went by the name Helicopter but later changed it to Nada Surf, which Caws said is "actually referring to something much more existential, it's just surfing on nothing. Being lost in your head or in your imagination but you know, whenever I listen to music I always find myself off somewhere. Somewhere in space. You know, in mental space and it's a reference to that." Caws and Lorca met at the Lycée Français de New York; both spent some of their childhood in France and Belgium, and played in many bands, including the Cost of Living and Because Because Because. Their first drummer, Daniel (later alluded to in the song "The Plan", from the album High/Low), was replaced by Aaron Conte, with whom the band recorded their first 7", The Plan/Telescope (1994), as well as the demo tape Tafkans, the raw version of High/Low. Those raw versions were later released on their second 7", Deeper Well/Pressure Free (1995), on the EP Karmic, and on North 6th Street.

In 1995, Conte left the band and was replaced by Ira Elliot, former drummer of the Fuzztones, a band from the 1980s New York scene, and of whom both Caws and Lorca were fans. After a Blonde Redhead show at the Knitting Factory, Nada Surf met former Cars frontman and Weezer producer Ric Ocasek. With little hope, they presented him with a copy of Tafkans. Three weeks later, Ocasek called back with news of his intention to produce the album. Soon after, the band was finalizing a contract with Elektra Records through an executive, Josh Deutsch.

On June 18, 1996, they released their debut album, High/Low, which was recorded and mastered within a nineteen-day period. Prior to this, the band released Karmic on No. 6 Records, a label run by Elektra A&R head Terry Tolkin. That summer, as Nada Surf toured the United States with Superdrag, their song "Popular" became a summer anthem, and the band toured overseas.

In 1998, they released The Proximity Effect, their follow-up album, in Europe. Produced by Fred Maher, the album gained little commercial success in the US. Their record label, thinking the album lacked a hit like "Popular", had the band record several covers, including "Black & White" (The dBs) and "Why Are You So Mean to Me?" (Vitreous Humor), to use as singles. Tired of the requirements of the A&R director, the band judged the album was perfect as-is (even though Elektra suggested the inclusion of an acoustic version of "Popular"), and broke their contract. As a consequence, Elektra did not release the album in the US and dropped the band while they were on a promotional tour in Europe. Despite these events, this album was critically acclaimed in France, where the band did a 30-show tour the following year.

=== 2000s ===
In 2000, Nada Surf released The Proximity Effect in the United States on their own label, MarDev (named after Caws' maternal grandmother, Margaret Devereux Lippitt, daughter of the painter Margaret Walthour Lippitt), after being dropped by Elektra. Subsequently, the band performed at their record release party at Luna Lounge in New York City and toured extensively for several months to rebuild their North American fan base.

From 1999 to 2002, the band members took regular day jobs: Caws worked at a Brooklyn record store called Earwax, Lorca worked on some computer projects, and Elliot did drum and guitar session work for other artists. Caws later referred to these times as a period of luxury, and the record store job as his "favorite job ever."

In 2002, they released Let Go, a critically acclaimed album that included the single "Inside of Love". They went on tour for several months, including many European festivals, in the summer of 2003. Mostly recorded the year before, the album was produced by their friends Louie Lino and Chris Fudurich, who had engineered The Proximity Effect; the band paid them with $1 and $5 bills, the money earned from tour merchandise sales.

In 2005, Nada Surf released The Weight Is a Gift, an album produced by Chris Walla (among others), and finished touring for this album in October of the following year. The record was made during a month spent at John Vanderslice's Tiny Telephone Studios in San Francisco.

In 2008, the band released Lucky, an album made with producer John Goodmanson at the Robert Lang Studios in Seattle, from material recorded the year before. That same year, their song "No Quick Fix" was featured as the Spinner MP3 of the Day, and they were featured on the cover of Beyond Race Magazine for the publication's winter issue.

=== 2010s ===
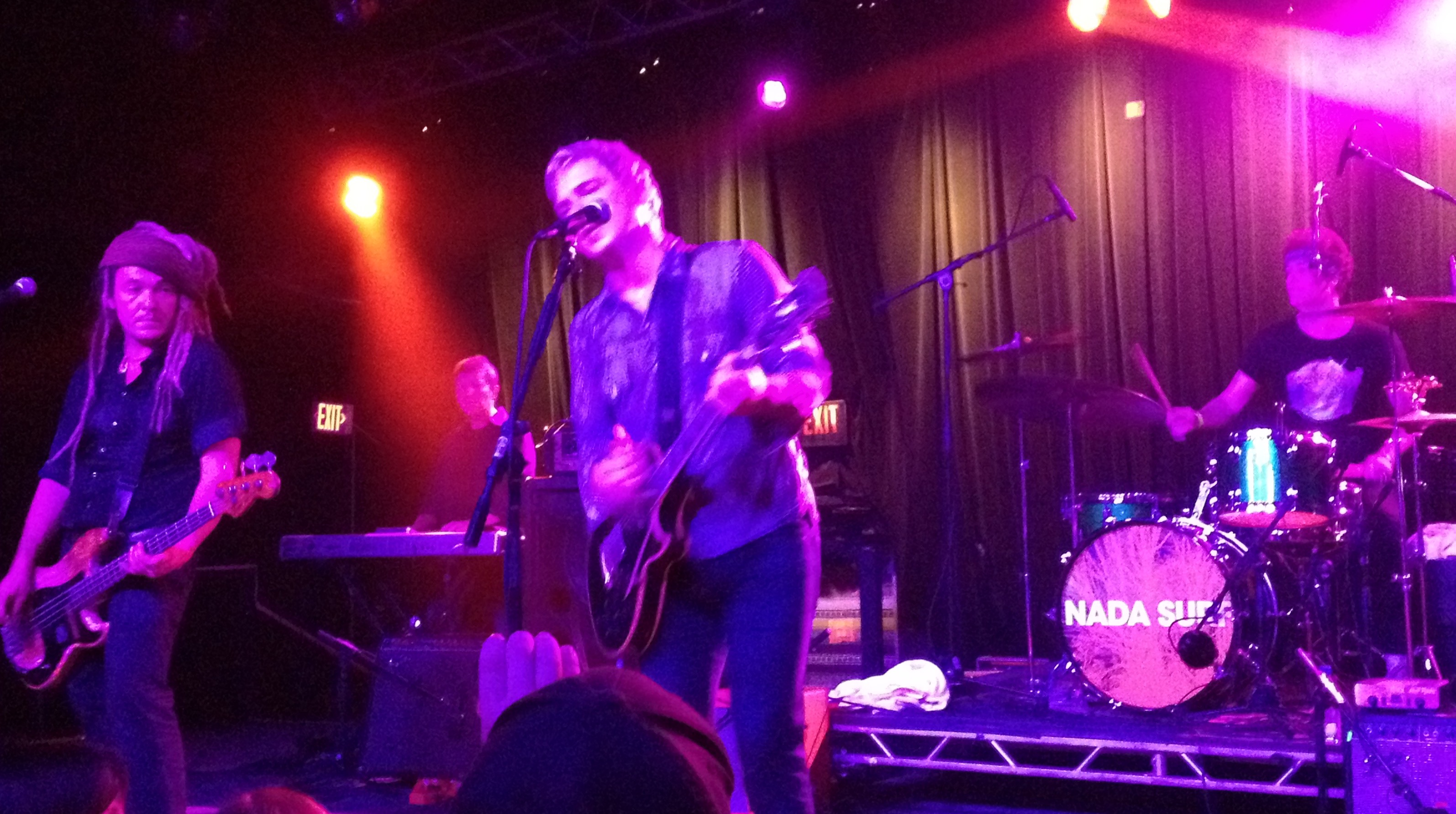
Nada Surf performing in 2012

In 2010, the band released If I Had a Hi-Fi, an album of covers including songs by the likes of Depeche Mode, Kate Bush, Spoon, and The Go-Betweens. Milwaukee noise rock band IfIHadAHiFi reciprocally titled their next album Nada Surf EP+3.

In January 2012, Nada Surf released The Stars Are Indifferent to Astronomy, an album that included the single "Waiting for Something".

Later in 2012, Caws, who had moved to England, recorded acoustic versions of five of the songs from The Stars Are Indifferent to Astronomy as b-sides, in collaboration with record producer Lee Russell. The material was released as The Dulcitone Files EP. The group released a compilation of rarities called B-Sides in 2014.

Nada Surf's eighth studio album, You Know Who You Are, with an official release date of March 4, 2016, was released for streaming in late February 2016.

In 2018, for the fifteenth anniversary of Let Go, the charity album Standing at the Gates: The Songs of Nada Surf's Let Go was released to benefit the ACLU and The Pablove Foundation. It consists of tracks from the band's 2002 album, covered by various artists, including the Long Winters, Ed Harcourt, Ron Gallo, Rogue Wave, Holly Miranda, and Aimee Mann.

=== 2020s ===
In November 2019, Nada Surf announced that their ninth studio album, Never Not Together, would be released via Barsuk Records (US) and City Slang (UK) on February 7, 2020. At the time of the announcement, they released a new single and lyric video, "Something I Should Do". According to the band, their experience while celebrating the 15th anniversary of Let Go in 2017 pushed them into a different creative mindset. They recorded many demos before thinning down the selection in an effort to find focus. The band also announced a major world tour to celebrate the album's release, starting on January 14 in Seattle, before moving through the US and also encompassing dates in the UK, Germany, Spain, Ireland, the Netherlands, Belgium, Austria, Italy, Switzerland, Sweden, Norway, and Denmark. Another single followed in December, entitled "Looking for You", accompanied by a music video directed by the band themselves.

Nada Surf opened the new decade with a single release, "So Much Love", on January 8, the third from Never Not Together. It garnered Rolling Stone's attention, who reviewed the single favorably. Double J in Australia added it and the previous single "Something I Should Do" to their playlist. On January 15, Nada Surf began their Never Not Together world tour at Neptune Theatre in Seattle.

On May 14, 2024, Nada Surf announced that their new album, titled Moon Mirror, would be released on September 13.

== Musical style ==
Nada Surf have been described as both an indie rock and "melodic" alternative rock band, with their lyrics characterized as "witty and literate". They have also been classified as part of "nerd rock revival", along with Weezer, Superdrag, and Cake.

== Band members ==
Current members

- Matthew Caws – lead vocals, guitar (1992–present)
- Daniel Lorca – bass, backing vocals (1992–present)
- Ira Elliot – drums, backing vocals (1995–present)
- Louie Lino – keyboards

Past members

- Aaron Conte – drums (1993–1995)

Contributing/touring members

- Daniel Brummel – bass, backing vocals (2016)
- Martin Wenk – trumpet, keyboards, xylophone
- Doug Gillard – guitar, backing vocals (2012–2019)

== Discography ==
- High/Low (1996)
- The Proximity Effect (1998)
- Let Go (2002)
- The Weight Is a Gift (2005)
- Lucky (2008)
- If I Had a Hi-Fi (2010)
- The Stars Are Indifferent to Astronomy (2012)
- You Know Who You Are (2016)
- Never Not Together (2020)
- Moon Mirror (2024)

== Bibliography ==
- The Hyperspace-Perspective in the Lyrics of Nada Surf, by Christian Auinger. Doctorate in Anglo-American language study, University of Vienna - 2005
