= Matthew Caws =

American singer-songwriter (born 1967)

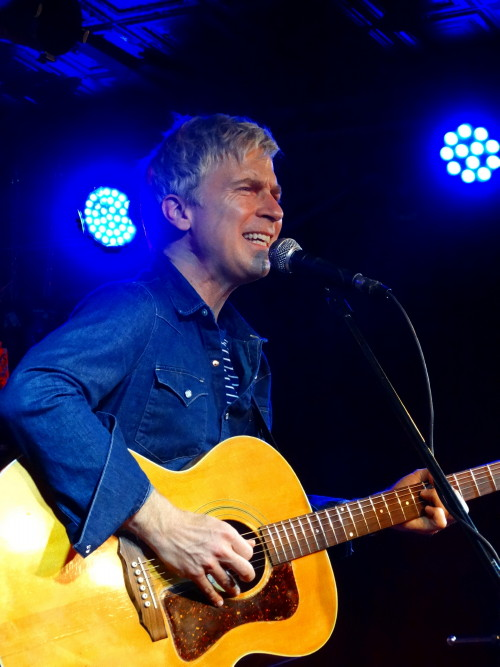
- Matthew Caws performing at The Saint in Asbury Park, NJ, October 2017.

Background information
- Born: 1967 (age 58–59); New York City, U.S.
- Genres: Indie rock, alternative rock
- Occupations: Musician, songwriter
- Instruments: Vocals, guitar
- Years active: 1985 - present
- Labels: Barsuk, Elektra, Heavenly (UK), City Slang (UK)
- Website: Official website

Matthew Rorison Caws (born 1967) is an American singer, songwriter and guitarist. He is most notable as the lead vocalist and guitarist of the alternative rock band Nada Surf. Caws is also a member of the indie rock duo Minor Alps, alongside Juliana Hatfield.

== Early life ==
Caws was born in New York City, the son of Peter James Caws and Mary Ann Caws. Caws' mother was born and raised in Wilmington, North Carolina. His father was born in Southall, Middlesex. Matthew Caws' parents, both university professors, took sabbaticals in France—in Paris, and in the Vaucluse in Provence—which helped Matthew develop early skills in French. Caws' great-grandmother was painter Margaret Walthour Lippitt.

Caws has a half sister from his father's second marriage named Elisabeth Breslin Caws. Caws has an older sister, Hilary Caws-Elwitt. She is married to humorist and playwright Jonathan Caws-Elwitt, who also writes erotica under the pen name Jeremy Edwards. They formed the band The Silly Pillows together and live in Northampton, Massachusetts.

== Musical projects ==
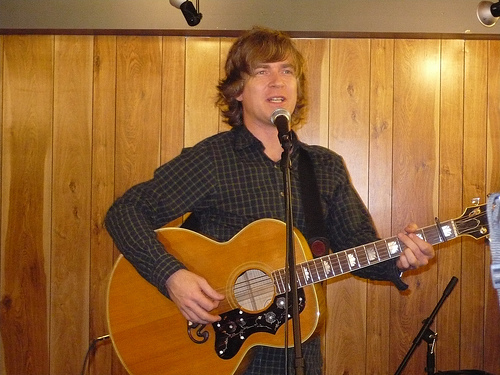
Matthew Caws

When the family returned to New York City, his parents sent him to the Lycée Français de New York. There he joined The Cost of Living in 1982 or 1983, a band formed by a teacher, Patrick Thouron, and a few students, including Daniel Lorca, Stéphane Dehais, and Fabrice Griffoulière-Frère.

The Cost of Living split up in 1990, after having released two records, played in venues such as CBGB, and having a video played on MTV, but Matthew and Daniel joined another band, Because Because Because, with two other musicians. This enterprise was short-lived and they soon split up, despite the recording of a demo for the label Stickboy, which would later release Nada Surf's first single (7"), "The Plan/Telescope", in 1994.

Hilary, Matthew's elder sister, was a college radio DJ. She helped develop and influence her younger brother's musical tastes, lending him records from her impressive collection and cassette tapes of her show. Matthew joined the project initiated by Hilary and her partner, Jonathan, The Silly Pillows, for a few collaborations.

He also wrote and edited for Guitar World, interviewing, among others, Oasis and Mick Jones.

=== Minor Alps ===
In 2013, Caws and singer-songwriter Juliana Hatfield formed the new band Minor Alps. The duo's debut album, Get There, was released on October 29, 2013 on Barsuk Records.

== Personal life ==
In 2016 he married Emily Bidwell. The couple has stated they will split their time between Caws' residence in Cambridge, England, and New York.

In 2022, Caws and his son made a PSA called "Living with a Mild Essential Tremor".
