= Duck tongue =

Type of duck offal

Marinated duck tongue (卤水鸭舌)

Duck tongue is the tongue eaten as food of the domestic duck. A type of offal, duck tongue is particularly eaten in multiple ways in Chinese cuisine.

== Description ==
Duck tongue has a curved internal bone, the hyoid bone, tipped with cartilage: the structure is called the hyoid apparatus. The flesh of the tongue is largely fat, with a strip of muscle along the bone. Duck tongue tastes dissimilar to typical duck meat, and is more comparable in texture to a gelatinous offal meat like braised pig's trotters, while retaining a slight crunch. The cartilage may be consumed as well.

== Preparation and consumption ==
In Samoan cuisine, duck tongue is a popular variety of offal. Being an archipelago with low domestic, meat production offal consumption increased during the period following World War II, along with turkey tail and chicken feet.

Duck tongue was recorded at an 18th century French cuisine banquet, prepared as an hors d'oeuvre alongside artichokes and sweetbreads.

=== China ===
Skewers of duck tongue (right) and pig intestines

In Chinese cuisine, duck tongue (Chinese: 鸭舌, romanized: yā shé) is first blanched, then may be prepared via multiple cooking methods, including stir-frying, braising, pickling, and deep-frying; in the latter, the tongue's skin becomes puffy, akin to chicharróns. The traditional preparation of duck tongue in Cantonese cuisine is braising as lu wei, where the tongue absorbs the strong master stock flavors. Food writer Fuchsia Dunlop describes the method of consumption as, "Using your chopsticks or your fingers, pop the tongue, tip first, into your mouth and close your lips around it. Then use your tongue and teeth to bite and suck away the edible parts." Another preparation of duck tongue that is typical of Cantonese cuisine involves steaming the tongue with a black bean sauce, then serving it as dim sum on a shallow dish.

Wuhan-style duck tongue

Duck tongue is consumed throughout China in different Chinese regional cuisines. Duck tongue is prepared in Sichuan cuisine, a regional cuisine that is particularly amenable to offal. There, as in Hunan, duck tongue is stir-fried with the webs from duck's feet. Tongue is one of the pieces of duck offal used in Wuhan duck, along with neck. Duck tongue is eaten in places like Wenzhou as an appetizer or drinking snack. Duck tongue preparations feature alongside other duck offal dishes in Beijing cuisine, alongside Peking duck banquets. A further preparation is 'crystal duck tongue', a duck tongue aspic. In Shanghai, duck tongue is eaten after undergoing red cooking in a mix of wine and dark soy sauce, while in Fujian, a dish of duck tongue with white and black fungus is among the most recognizable of the region's cuisine.

Being a small and fundamentally limited piece of offal, large preparations of duck tongues are a status symbol in China. A late-19th century report from a traveller to China describes strings of duck tongues available for sale in stores. Today, duck tongues are available in Chinese grocery stores, frozen, to be defrosted before cooking.

== See also ==
- Juewei Duck Neck
- Beef tongue
