= Shock =

Shock may refer to:

== Common uses ==
=== Healthcare ===
- Acute stress reaction, also known as psychological or mental shock
  - Shell shock, soldiers' reaction to battle trauma
- Circulatory shock, a medical emergency
  - Cardiogenic shock, resulting from dysfunction of the heart
  - Distributive shock, resulting from an abnormal distribution of blood flow
    - Septic shock, a result of severe infection
      - Toxic shock syndrome, a specific type of severe infection
    - Anaphylactic shock, a result of severe allergic reaction
    - Neurogenic shock, due to a high spinal cord injury disrupting the sympathetic nervous system
  - Hypovolemic shock, resulting from an insufficient blood volume
    - Hemorrhagic shock, from a large volume lost to bleeding
  - Obstructive shock, resulting from mechanical obstruction of blood flow
- Cold shock response of organisms to sudden cold, especially cold water
- Electric shock
  - Defibrillation, electric shock to restore heart rhythm
  - Electroconvulsive therapy or shock treatment, psychiatric treatment
- Hydrostatic shock, from ballistic impact
- Insulin shock or diabetic hypoglycemia, from too much insulin
  - Insulin shock therapy, purposely induced insulin shock, obsolete therapy
- Osmotic shock, caused by solute concentration around a cell

=== Physical sciences ===
- Shock (mechanics), a sudden acceleration or deceleration
  - Shock absorber
  - Shock mount
  - Shock wave
    - Oblique shock
- Shock (fluid dynamics), an abrupt discontinuity in the flow field
- Bow shock, in planetary science and astronomy
- Electric shock
- Shock chlorination of water to reduce bacteria and algae
- Shocks and discontinuities (magnetohydrodynamics)
- Thermal shock

=== Social sciences ===
- Shock (economics), an unpredicted event that affects an economy
  - Demand shock
  - Supply shock
- Culture shock, in social psychology
- Shock value, in popular psychology

=== Collective noun ===
- Shock, a historic commercial term for a group of 60, see English numerals#Special names
- Stook, or shock of grain, stacked sheaves

== Places ==
- Shock, West Virginia, an unincorporated US community

== People ==
=== People with the given name or nickname ===
- Shock or Harry Del Rios (born 1973), American professional wrestler
- Shock G or Gregory E. Jacobs (1963–2021), American musician and rapper

=== People with the surname ===
- Shock (surname)

== Arts, entertainment, and media ==
=== Categories and genres ===
- Shock art
- Shock jock, deliberately offensive broadcaster
- Shock rock, a genre of rock music
- Shock site, deliberately offensive website

=== Films ===
- The Shock (film), a 1923 silent film
- Shock (1934 film), starring Ralph Forbes
- Shock (1946 film), starring Vincent Price
- Shock (1977 film), an Italian film
- Shock (2004 film), a Tamil film starring Prashanth Thyagarajan
- Shock (2006 film), a Telugu film

=== Music ===
==== Groups and labels ====
- Shock (troupe), an English music/mime/dance group
- Shock Records, an Australian record label

==== Artists ====
- Culture Shock (musician), British producer and DJ
- Minotaur Shock, British electronica musician
- ShockOne, Australian producer and DJ
- Stefie Shock, Canadian singer-songwriter

==== Albums ====
- Shock (The Motels album), 1985
- Shock (Tesla album), 2019

==== Songs ====
- "Shock" (Beast song), a 2010 song by South Korean boy band Beast
- "Shock" (Fear Factory song), a 1998 song by Fear Factory
- "Shock" (The Motels song), 1985
- "Shock", a 1987 song by The Psychedelic Furs from Midnight to Midnight
- "Shock!", a 2022 song by Sakanaction from Adapt
- "Shock!", a 2010 song by the Japanese band Cute
- "Shock (Unmei)", a 2009 song by Meisa Kuroki

=== Other arts, entertainment, and media ===
- Elektra Shock, New Zealand drag performer
- Shock: Social Science Fiction, role-playing game
- Shock Theater, a 1950s and 1960s American television film series
- Shock (novel), a 2001 novel by Robin Cook
- Shock (character), a Marvel Comics supervillain
- Shock (journal), a medical journal
- Shock (musical), a Japanese stage musical series
- The Shock (TV program), an Arabic-language hidden-camera show
- Shock Gibson, a comic book superhero
- "Shock" (The Gentle Touch), a television episode

== Military ==
- Shock and awe, display of force to destroy an opponent's will to fight
- Shock tactics, a close quarter battle tactic
- Shock troops, who apply shock tactics

== Sports and teams ==
- San Francisco Shock, a professional Overwatch League team
- Shock Linwood, American college running back
- Spokane Shock, an arena football team based in Spokane, Washington, US
- Tulsa Shock, a WNBA professional women's basketball team
  - Detroit Shock, previous name of Tulsa Shock

== See also ==
- Schock (disambiguation)
- Shock therapy (disambiguation)
- Shocked (disambiguation)
- Shocker (disambiguation)
- Shocking (disambiguation)
