= Shook (surname) =

Shook is a surname, and may refer to:

- Al Shook (1899–1984), American football player
- Alex Shook (born 1969), American politician from West Virginia
- Alexander MacDonald Shook (1888–1966), Canadian World War I flying ace
- Barbara Ingalls Shook (1938–2008), American philanthropist
- Benjamin L. Shook, American bandleader, singer and composer
- Edwin M. Shook (1911–2000), American archaeologist and Mayanist
- Eric N. Shook, game designer
- Fred Shook (Fredric Warden Shook) (1919–1992), American football player
- Jack Shook (1910–1986), American guitarist
- Karel Shook (1920–1985), American ballet master, choreographer and writer
- Kerry Shook (born 1962), American minister and author
- Kylee Shook (born 1998), American basketball player
- Marcus Boyd Shook (1933–2022), American physician
- Melissa Shook (1939–2020), American documentary photographer, artist and educator
- Ray Shook (1889–1970), American baseball player
- Robert L. Shook (born 1938), American business book author
- Sarah Shook (born 1985), American country singer-songwriter
- Sheridan Shook (died 1899), American businessman and tax collector in New York City
- Teresa Shook (born 1956), American lawyer and founder of the Women's March
- Travis Shook (born 1969), American jazz pianist
- Veda Shook, American flight attendant and labor leader
- Warner Shook, American theatre director and actor

== See also ==
- Shock (surname)
