= Duck as food =

Meat from duck

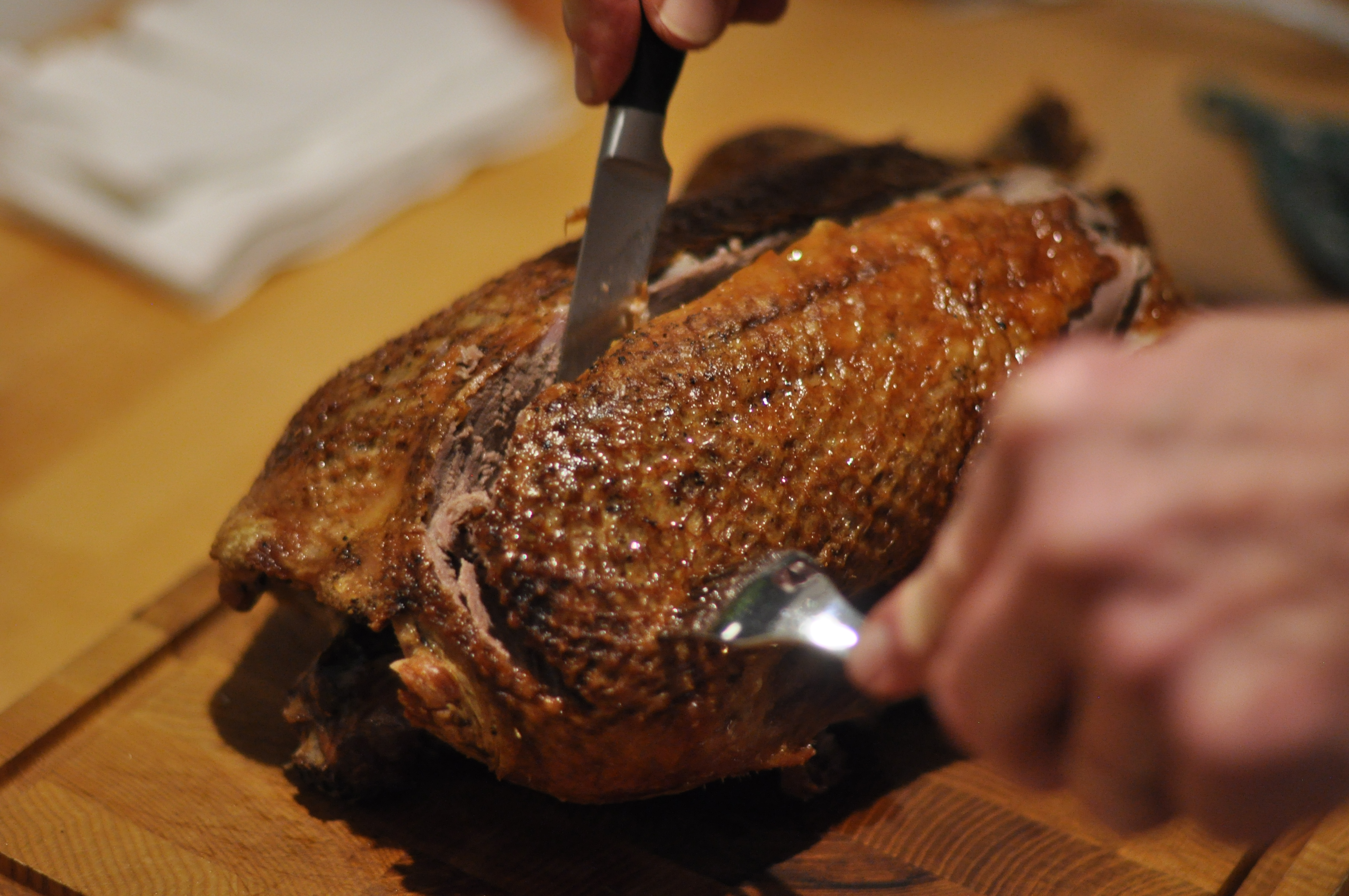

In cooking and gastronomy, duck or duckling is the meat of any of several species of bird in the family Anatidae, found in both fresh and salt water. It is found in domestic and wild forms and is a very calorie dense food, containing high fat, protein, and iron. Duck has been hunted in the wild for thousands of years, and has been domesticated and bred for more than two thousand years, resulting in several breeds with varying characteristics.

Duck is eaten in many cuisines around the world. It features in dishes from many parts of Africa; In Asian cooking it is familiar in Peking duck in China and several Indian dishes and it features in the food of the Near East. In Europe it has an important role in French cuisine, in which there are numerous recipes for cooking it, and is well known in the cuisines of Britain, Poland and Russia. It is less central to the cuisines of Italy and Spain. It is also consumed in Australia and New Zealand.

== History and breeds ==
=== Wild duck ===
Wild duck breeds have been hunted and cooked through thousands of years. They include the mallard – the commonest wild duck (the canard sauvage of France) and the one most eaten worldwide, because it is abundant and generally understood to be of first-class table quality. Other wild ducks commonly eaten in Europe are the pintail (Anas acuta), the teal (Anas crecca), the scaup (Aythya marila), the shoveler (Spatula (or Rhynchaspis) clypeata), the widgeon (Anas penelope) and the pochard (Aythya ferina).

In North America the most highly rated wild duck is the Canvasback (Aythya valisinaria), named for the light canvas colour of its back; it is said to derive its flavour from the wild celery it gets by diving. In addition to the wild ducks familiar in Europe, other breeds highly prized in the Americas are the Black duck (Anas rubripes), the Carolina or Wood duck (Aix sponsa), the Redhead (Nyroca americana), the Ring-neck (Aythya collaris), and the Masked duck (Nomonyx dominicus), from Dominica.

Wild duck is usually served rare – The Oxford Companion to Food (OCF) quotes an old saying that a mallard should walk through the kitchen, a widgeon should run slowly through and a teal should rush through.

=== Domesticated duck ===
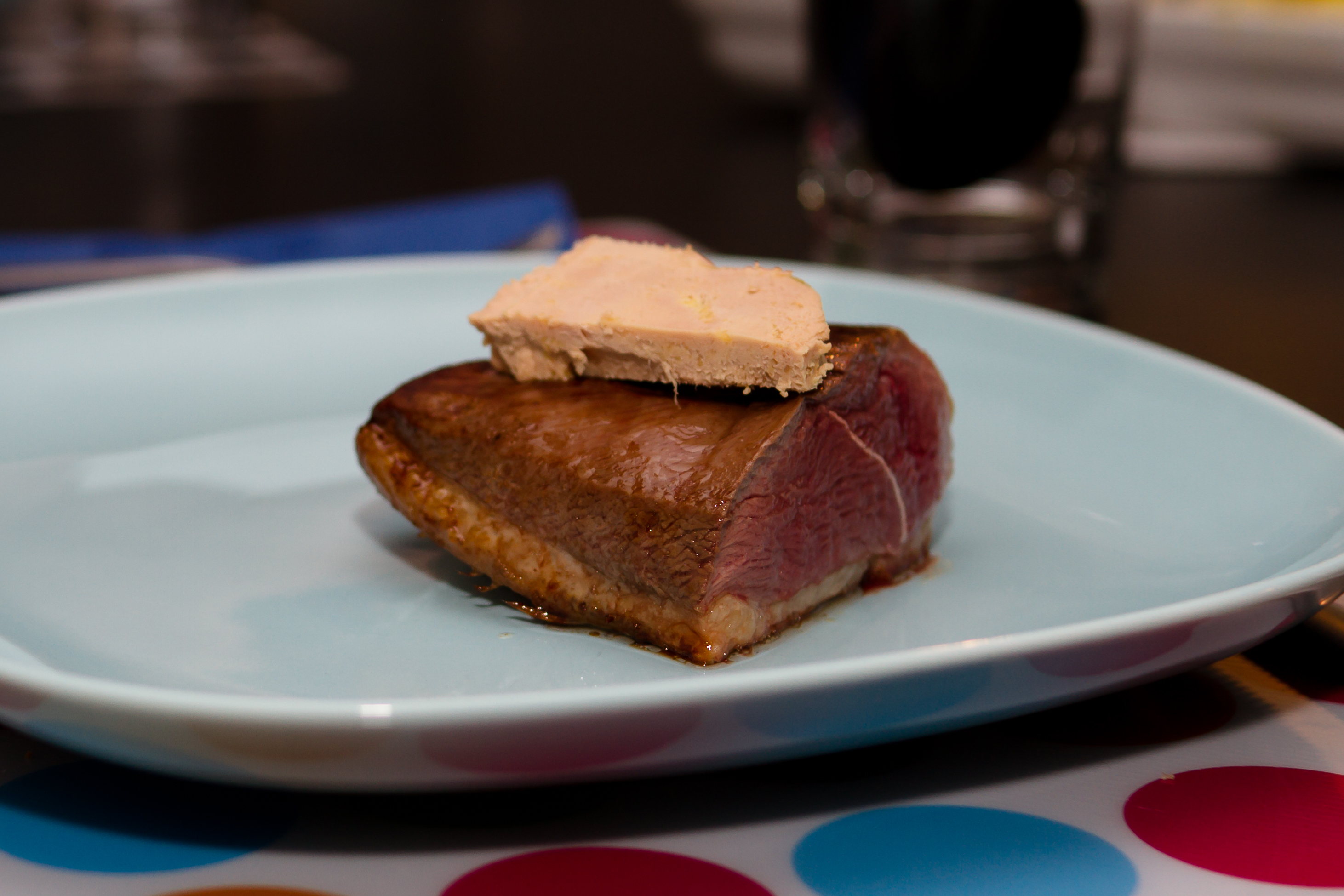
Duck breast topped with foie gras

Domestication began over 2,000 years ago in China, and was practised in classical Rome, recorded by Lucius Columella in the first century AD. In Europe and North America almost all domesticated breeds descend from the mallard duck, although they differ greatly in size and appearance. A duck is usually six months old or more, and a duckling is younger. The French terms are canard and caneton.

Ducks have been domesticated for so long that breeding has altered them greatly from their original form, as they have been selected for special characteristics. Some, such as Indian Runners and Khaki Campbells were bred for egg-laying. The principal breeds for cooking are:

- Aylesbury – named after a town in the English county of Buckinghamshire, which had suitable surroundings for duck-rearing. These are white ducks; their meat is pale and tender. They are similar to Rouen ducks, put on weight rapidly and have dark and tender flesh. They grow to about 2 kg (4–5 Ib) when dressed.
- Long Island – the OCF describes this breed as "the best, best known, and most widely sold of American ducks". The breed is descended from white Peking birds imported from China in the 1870s. It was introduced first to Connecticut and then to Long Island, where the breed flourished. It is believed to be produced in greater numbers than any other duck; it grows to a little under 2kg (3½–4lb) as ducklings and 3kg (5–6 lb) as ducks.
- Muscovy – These are nothing to do with Muscovy and are of the species Cairina moschata, from Central and South America. The OCF states that Muscovy ducks make good eating, especially when crossed with other ducks to diminish their tendency to muskiness. It is the favourite breed in Australia.
- Nantes – From early in the 19th century the small Nantais ducks (strictly speaking, according to the OCF, from Challans – Nantes being the point from which they were dispatched to Paris) enjoyed a high reputation, which grew to rival that of the larger Rouen breed. Nantais ducks are beheaded and bled before sale.
- Norfolk – Most English ducks and ducklings are labelled "Norfolk". The county is the most important British centre of production of birds that meet the requirements of restaurants and conform to the latest hygiene regulations.
- Peking – When first imported to Britain in the 19th century it was crossed with Aylesburys to give the latter breed more vigour. The Peking was later bred on its own account. In the US it gave rise to what has become the most successful breed in the western world.
- Rouen – A famous French breed. To preserve all the blood inside, the birds are traditionally strangled or smothered to death. The well known dish Caneton à la rouennaise requires the carcase of the cooked bird to be squeezed in a special press to extract all its juices.

Production of duck meat

Production of duck meat per animal

== Regional cuisines ==
=== Africa ===
Laurens van der Post recorded a duck dish favoured in East Africa: the bird is browned in the oven and then slowly casseroled with stock made from the minced liver of the duck, stock, chili and cloves. Served with lemon juice and finely chopped red pepper added to a sauce thickened with cassava, accompanied by rice. In some versions of this duck dish, green bananas or plantains are either added to the braising liquid or served separately as a side dish.

Duck tagine with pears is from North African cuisine. Duck breasts are browned before being braised in chicken stock with sliced pears, onions, garlic, cinnamon, saffron and coriander. In a Ghanaian duck dish the bird is stuffed with shredded chicken or other meat, yam or cassava, tomatoes and onions, roast and served with rice. A South African dish of duck stuffed with mixed dried fruit braised in chicken stock and apple juice is thought to have originated with the Malay cooks whom the Dutch settlers employed.

A recipe for wild mallard, Doohwee in plantain poponda sauce, is common to several African countries. The bird may be braised either in coconut milk or stock and the cooking liquid may also contain some or all of plantain, onions, ginger, garlic, tomatoes, sweet peppers, chili peppers, basil (poponda) and mint.

=== Asia ===
==== China ====
===== Peking duck =====
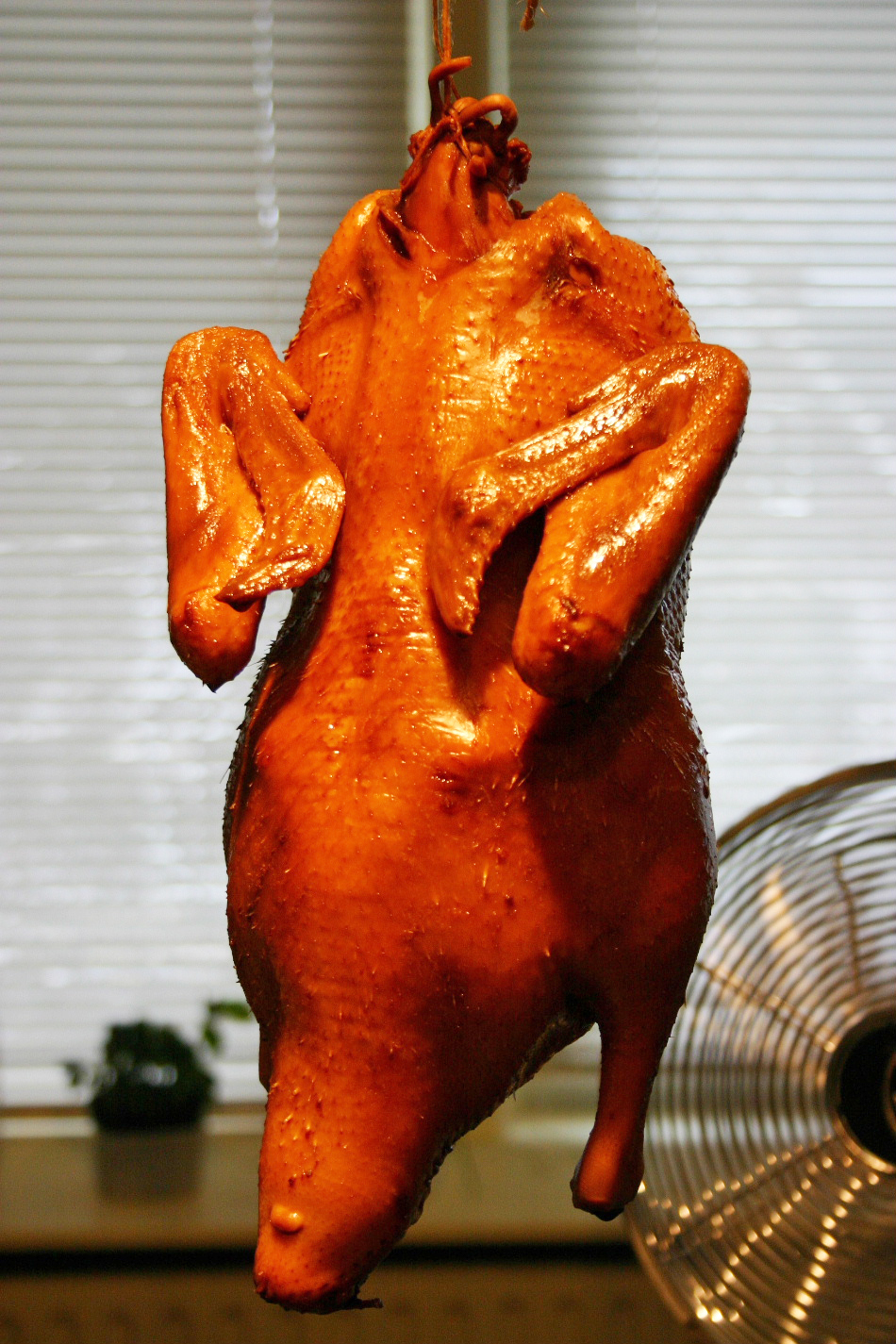
Peking duck

Duck is commonly sold in the style of Peking duck. Found throughout the country, they are displayed hanging after being cooked.

The fattened birds are killed, plucked, gutted and rinsed with water. Air is pumped under the skin through the neck cavity to separate the skin from the fat. The duck is then briefly blanched in boiling water and hung up to dry; this tightens the skin. The duck is glazed with a layer of syrup with honey. A second layer of glaze of soy sauce, five-spice powder, and maltose is applied inside and out, and the duck is left to stand for 24 hours in a cool, dry place (or a refrigerator). It is then roasted in an oven until the skin turns shiny brown.

In the view of Tom Stobart in The Cook's Encyclopaedia (1998):

the trouble the Chinese take with ducks – removing the oil glands in the tail, inflating the animal to separate the skin from the flesh to get a better crackle, or stuffing it with wild mixtures of stir-fried pork, water chestnuts, ginkgo nuts, ham, shrimps and rice wine – makes even pressed Rouen duck seem simple.

===== Wuhan duck =====
Wuhan duck parts at a Juewei Duck Neck shop

Also popular in China is Wuhan duck. Various parts are braised and sold in specialty shops and kiosks around the country. They are traditionally very spicy.

==== India ====
Duck meat is part of Indian cuisine, especially important in Northeast India, such as in the Assamese cuisine. Popular dishes include duck with white gourd, duck with laixak and duck with bamboo shoots. Duck meat and squab pigeon are also cooked with banana blossoms.

==== Korea ====
Oritang is a variety of guk, Korean soup made with duck and various vegetables.

==== Southeast Asia ====
In Bali, duck (bebek) is variously made into duck soup with banana stem (jukut ares bebek), duck parcels wrapped in banana leaf (tum bebek), minced with spices and coconut cream (lawar), or are smoked whole in one of Bali's best-known dishes (bebek betutu).

Balut is a bird embryo boiled and eaten from the shell. It is sold as street food in the Philippines and around Southeast Asia.

Thai cusine includes a roast duck soup, with the meat shredded into a mixture of chicken stock, lime juice, hot chili, lemongrass, Thai basil and fish sauce.

=== Europe ===
==== Britain ====
According to Dorothy Hartley's Food in England, although a chicken with green peas is traditional for Easter Sunday, duck with green peas takes its place for Whitsuntide. She says it is given a delicate sage and onion stuffing, and the roast bird is served with apple sauce, green peas and new potatoes, with possibly small pork sausages or hot boiled bacon served alongside.

In The Art of Cookery Made Plain and Easy (first published in 1747), Hannah Glasse printed a recipe for duck braised in broth or water with bacon and covered with lean beef, with the optional addition of chopped veal sweetbreads, truffles and oysters. From the next century, Elizabeth David cites Lady Llanover's "Welsh Salt Duck": soaked in brine for three days and then poached slowly and served hot with white onion sauce.

Stobart comments, "Many British restaurants go in for a sloppy version of the French Caneton à l'orange, which too often means duck with a dollop of marmalade in the gravy".

==== France ====
Duck plays a major role in French cuisine. Among the dishes traditionally made with it are:

French	English	Contents	Ref
A l'allemande	German style	Stuffed with white bread soaked in milk, mixed with the giblets, chopped parsley, salt and pepper, roasted, the pan juice deglazed with brown stock. Cucumber salad served separately.	
À l'alsacienne	Alsatian style	Braised, cut in pieces, dressed on sauerkraut cooked in white wine, garnished with small boiled potatoes, served with thick gravy.	
A l'ananas	With pineapple	Roast duck garnished with small pineapple slices slightly sautéed in butter, pan juice deglazed with pineapple juice and brandy, boiled up with thick veal gravy.	
À l'ancienne	Ancient style	Braised, served with sauerkraut, sliced bacon, sliced sausage and glazed carrots.	
À l'anglaise	English style	Stuffed with sage and onion, braised or roast. Gravy made with the pan juice.	
À la badoise	Badois style	Braised with mirepoix, ham and mushroom trimmings in Rhine wine, dressed on sauerkraut. Sauce of stock boiled down with demi-glace with truffles and bacon.	
À la Béarnaise	Bearnaise style	Simmered in white stock with bacon, carrots, turnips, cabbage, white and green beans. Served with Parmesan croutons.	
Beaulieu	Beaulieu	Roast, garnished with olives, artichoke hearts and new potatoes; pan juice deglazed with Madeira and boiled down with demi-glace.	
Bigarade	With bitter orange sauce	Rosted rare, deglazed with Seville orange sauce; breast cut into long thin slices and covered with the sauce.	
Bouilli	Boiled	1. Boiled in water with herbs and a larded onion, served with horseradish or onion sauce.; 2. Stuffed with bread soaked in milk, mixed with the chopped liver, parsley, herbs and seasoning, wrapped in a cloth, boiled.	
À la bordelaise	Bordeaux style	Roast, stuffed with bread soaked in milk, chopped liver, parsley, green olives, sautéed mushrooms, eggs and garlic.	
À la bourguignonne	Burgundy style	Braised in red wine and light demi-glace, garnished with glazed button onions, fried button mushrooms and diced fried bacon.	
Carmen (froid)	Carmen (cold)	Roast; when cold, breast and breast bone cut off, cavity filled with goose liver froth, sliced breast placed back into position, decorated with tangerine slices and red cherries, glazed with aspic jelly,	
Aux cerises	With cherries	Rosted rare, deglazed with Madeira breast cut into long thin slices and covered with a cherry sauce.	
Chipolata	Chipolata	Braised, garnished with small pork sausages and braised chestnuts; thickened gravy served separately.	
Au chou	With cabbage	Cut in pieces, browned in butter, braised with cabbage, blanched and cut in quarters, and diced bacon.	
Aux concombres	With cucumbers	Braised, garnished with cucumber balls simmered in butter and croutons fried in butter.	
Confit de canard	Preserved duck	Duck portions, usually the legs, salted and slow cooked while completely submerged in duck fat. One cooked, stored away until wanted for a dish.	
Duclair	Duclair	Stuffed with bread soaked in milk, mixed with chopped giblets and parsley, roasted, deglazed with red wine and orange juice, boiled up with demi-glace.	
Farci a l'allemande	Stuffed, German style	Stuffed with apples, roasted, braised red cabbage, boiled potatoes and served with thick gravy.	
À la fermière	Farm style	Braised in white wine with light demi-glace, small slices of carrots, turnips, celery and onions, with green beans and green peas.	
À la flamande	Flemish style	Braised, garnished with braised cabbage balls, bacon cooked with the cabbage, glazed carrots and turnips and slices of garlic sausage.	
Galantine de caneton	Galantine of duckling	A whole boned duckling, flesh mixed with finely minced pork, truffles, brandy and foie gras, sewn up in the skin of the duck and cooked in the oven, resembling a long fat sausage with the bird's feet protruding at one end.	
A l'italienne	Italian style	Browned in butter, braised with calf's feet, onions, raw ham trimmings and bacon; sauce made of chopped mushrooms, parsley and chives sautéed in oil.	
À la japonaise (cold)	Japanese style	Braised; when cold, coated with brown chaud-froid sauce, glazed with aspic jelly, garnished with small tangerines.	
À la lyonnaise	Lyon style	Braised, garnished with glazed button onions and chestnuts.	
Magret de canard	Duck breast	Bird bred for its foie gras. Breasts widely used in various dishes	
Au Malaga (cold)	Malaga style	Braised with sliced onions and carrots in red wine and brown stock; when cold, breast sliced and put back into position, covered with brown chaud-froid sauce.	
À la maltaise	Maltese style	Braised in white wine, light demi-glace and the juice of blood oranges with mirepoix; sauce mixed with blanched Julienne of blood oranges.	
Marshall Robert (froid)	Marshall Robert (cold)	Roast; when cold, breast cut out and cut into thin slices, each slice spread with goose liver pâté, placed back into position, coated with brown sauce, served garnished with orange quarters.	
À la menthe	With mint	Pot roast and deglazed with thick veal gravy with chopped mint.	
À la moderne	Modern style	Cut into pieces, browned in butter, braised in Port wine and light demi-glace with chopped shallots and anchovies.	
Molière	Molière	Boned, stuffed with liver, pork sausage meat with chopped truffles; wrapped in a cloth and poached in duck stock. Served with Madeira sauce and sliced truffles.	
Mousse de caneton	Mousse of duckling	Boned, meat processed to a paste and mixed with egg whites and whipped cream, poached and served hot.	
Caneton nantais à la choûcroute	Duckling with sauerkraut, Nantes style	Slowly braised in Rhine wine and veal stock, served with sauerkraut and braised salt pork.	
Aux navets	With turnips	Braised in demi-glace, garnished with turnips sautéed in butter and cooked with the duck.	
À la nivernaise	Nevers style	Braised, dressed with Nivernaise sauce (made of dry white wine, shallots, garlic, thyme, bay leaf, peppercorns and parsley)	
À la normande	Normandy style	Browned, flambéd with Calvados, braised in stock and cider boiled down with cream, garnished with apple sautéed in butter.	
À la nordique (cold)	Nordic style (cold)	Stuffed with goose liver forcemeat, braised, when cold coated with brown sauce, glazed with aspic jelly and served with Russian salad.	
Aux olives	With olives	Braised in white wine and light demi-glace, olives added when nearly cooked, sauce flavoured with Madeira.	
A l'orange	With orange	Braised in light demi-glace, sauce finished off with Seville orange juice and lemon juice; served with a fine julienne of orange peel, bordered with orange segments.	
Au porto	With port wine	Roasted very rare, breast cut in long thin slices and kept warm in chafing dish, deglazed with port and thick veal gravy, mixed with the juice crushed out of the carcase in a special duck press and poured over the breast.	
Aux petits pois	With green peas	Roast; when more then half done, green peas, shredded lettuce, diced bacon, button onions and light demi-glace are added.	
À la provençale	Provence style	Cut into pieces, browned, simmered in white wine with diced tomatoes and garlic, anchovies, olives and sweet basil.	
Aux raisins	With grapes	Braised in red wine and veal stock with thin orange peel. Served with rice pilaf and sautéed mushrooms.	
Caneton rouennais à la presse	Pressed duckling Rouen style	The duckling is lightly roasted and the breasts are sliced into thin strips and seasoned. The rest of the carcase is put in a press to extract the juice, which is mixed with red wine and brandy, heated and poured on the strips of breast.	
À la russe	Russian style	Braised; when nearly cooked, sliced pickled cucumbers are added. The stock is boiled down with sour cream.	
À la savoyarde	Savoy style	1. Braised with sliced onions, dressed on a potato and cheese gratin. 2. Browned with diced bacon and button onions, braised in brown stock, tomatoes concassées and sliced mushrooms.	
À la sévillanne (froid)	Seville style (cold)	Boned, stuffed with half gratin and half mousseline forcemeat mixed with thick tomato puree and diced goose liver, wrapped in a cloth and poached in white stock. When cold, the breast cut into thin slices and put back into position, coated with brown sauce flavoured with sherry. Garnished with large olives stuffed with goose liver pâté.	
Simone	Simone	Boned, stuffed with pork forcemeat mixed with diced truffles and braised lightly crushed chestnuts, browned, braised in champagne and veal stock. When nearly cooked, glazed button onions and small raw truffles are added. Morels in cream sauce are served separately.	
Suprême de canard	Suprême of duck	Duck breast sautéed in butter.	
En terrine	Potted	Stuffed with duck forcemeat mixed with goose liver and chopped shallots lightly fried in butter, cooked in tightly closed casserole dish. Served hot or cold.	

==== Italy ====
Duck does not play a major part in the cuisine of Italy, but there are several original Venetian recipes for stuffed duck such as anatra col pien, including in the stuffing veal, sausage, bread soaked in Marsala, bitter-almond biscuits and Parmesan cheese. While roasting, the bird is basted with wine and rosemary. Another traditional Venetian recipe marinates joints of wild duck in vinegar and water, and then browns them together with capers, anchovies, olives, rosemary and sage, to finish cooking slowly in white wine, lemon juice, and grappa. Anatra ripiena is another Venetian recipe for duck, sometimes boned, stuffed with a mixture of breadcrumbs soaked in milk sopressa (a soft local salumi), the bird’s liver, parmesan, parsley, sage, rosemary, nutmeg and sometimes some tuna and roast.

Anatra con le lenticchie, a Genoese dish, is cooked in wine in a casserole with celery, onion, carrot, garlic and bay leaves, and finished with some partly cooked lentils added towards the end of cooking. A duck dish from Basilicata combines a bird braised with black olives, served with penne in a highly seasoned tomato sauce.

==== Poland ====
Duck dishes in Polish cuisine include Kaczka z jabłkami – roast duck stuffed with apples, and Dzika kaczka – wild duck braised with red cabbage and onions. Czernina is a Polish soup made with duck blood, broth and vinegar.

==== Russia ====
In Russian cuisine duck dishes include zharyenaya s vishnyami, zharyenaya s yablokami, and tushonnaya s gribami – respectively, roast with cherries, roast with baked apples and braised with mushrooms.

==== Spain ====
Davidson comments that although ducks are so valued in France, they are much less so in Spain: "Perhaps one reason is that the French roast duck for rather a short time (as the British do with wild duck) and eat it pink though not bloody ... whereas Spanish recipes advocate roasting a duck for 2 hours. They also say that the meat is dry and inferior to chicken, which is not surprising". Spanish recipes for braised duck include Pato estofado, slowly cooked in white wine with onions and bay leaf.

=== Near East ===
Iranian cuisine includes Khoresht-e Fesenjan, described by the food writer Margaret Shaida as "that most aristocratic of all Persia's stews". It consists of a duck casseroled in duck stock with onions, minced walnuts and pomegranate juice or paste. It is customarily served with plain white rice, and may be garnished with meatballs made of minced lamb or veal.

Barvaz be tapooz is a dish eaten in Israel of duck stuffed with oranges and then roast in a very hot oven. It is served with a sauce of white wine, light stock and orange juice.

Sweet potatoes were introduced to Lebanon from Central Africa and have been absorbed into Lebanese cuisine. A local duck recipe braises the bird with carrots, celery and onion and serves it with a sweet-sour sauce of duck stock, honey and vinegar poured over the duck and the sweet potatoes which have been separately boiled and then sautéed.

Ördek dolmasi is a Turkish duck dish: the bird is braised in duck stock and then roast, stuffed with rice, pistachios, cinnamon, cloves and raisins.

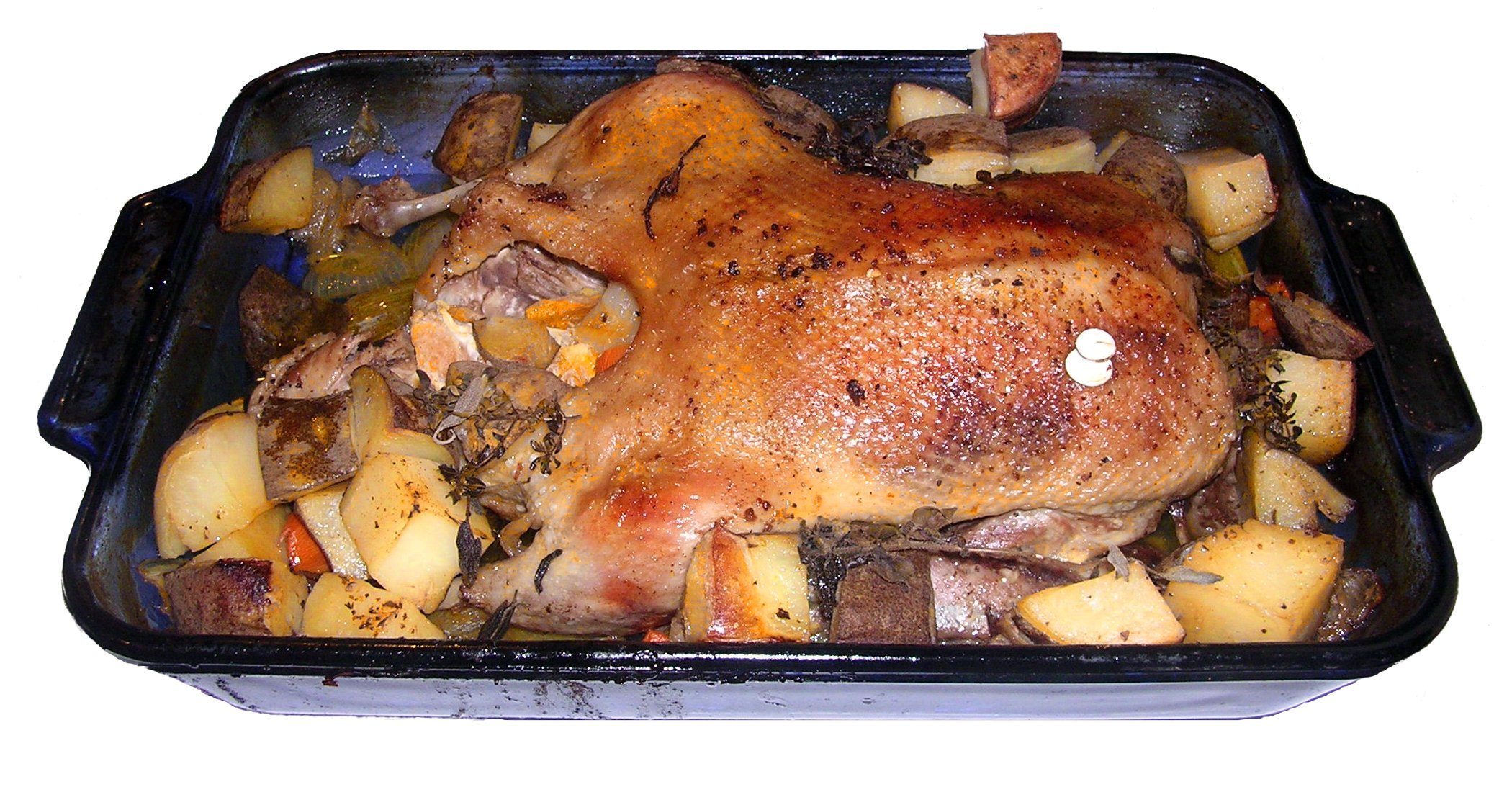
Whole roast duck with potatoes

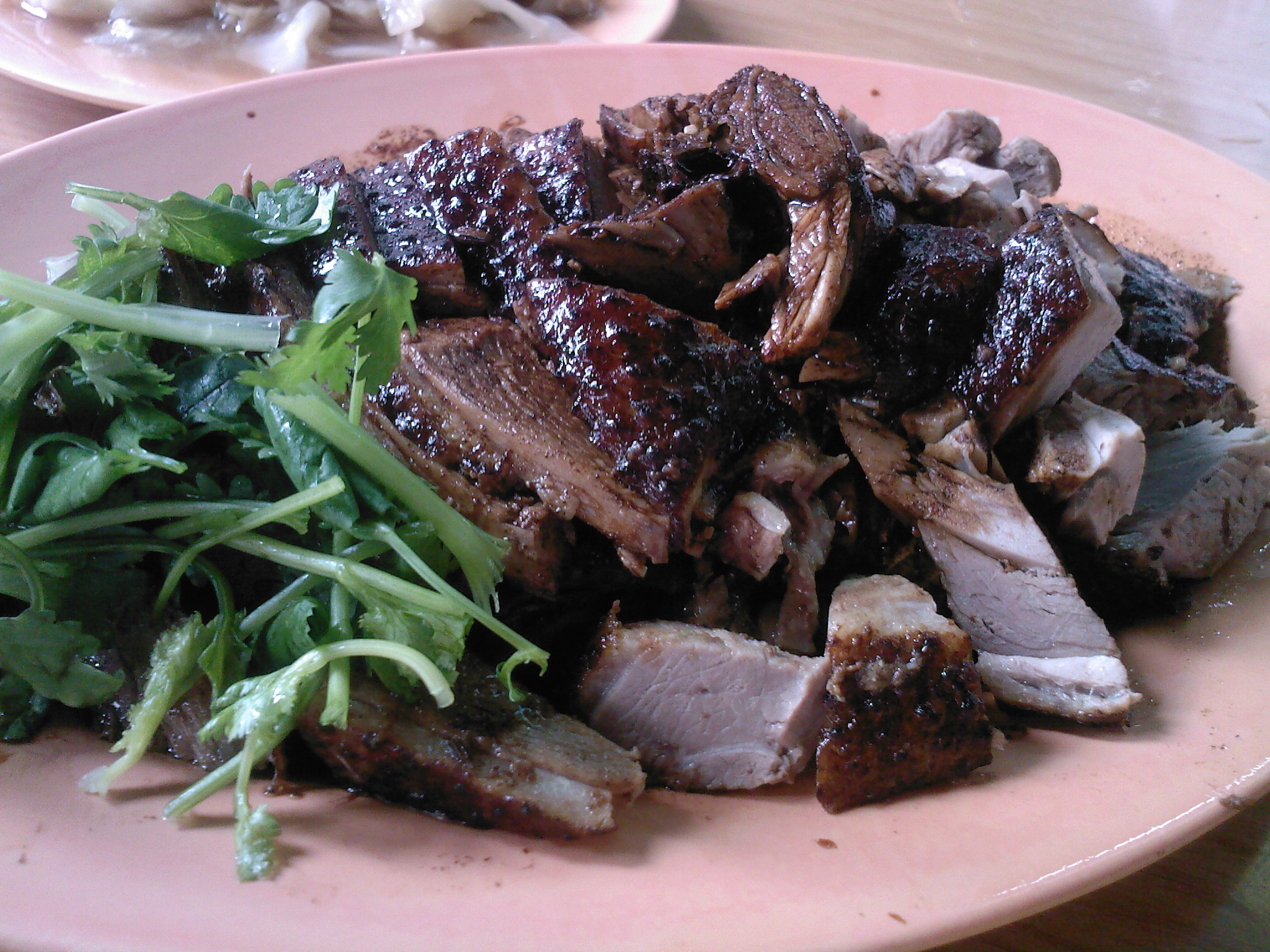
Braised duck Teochew

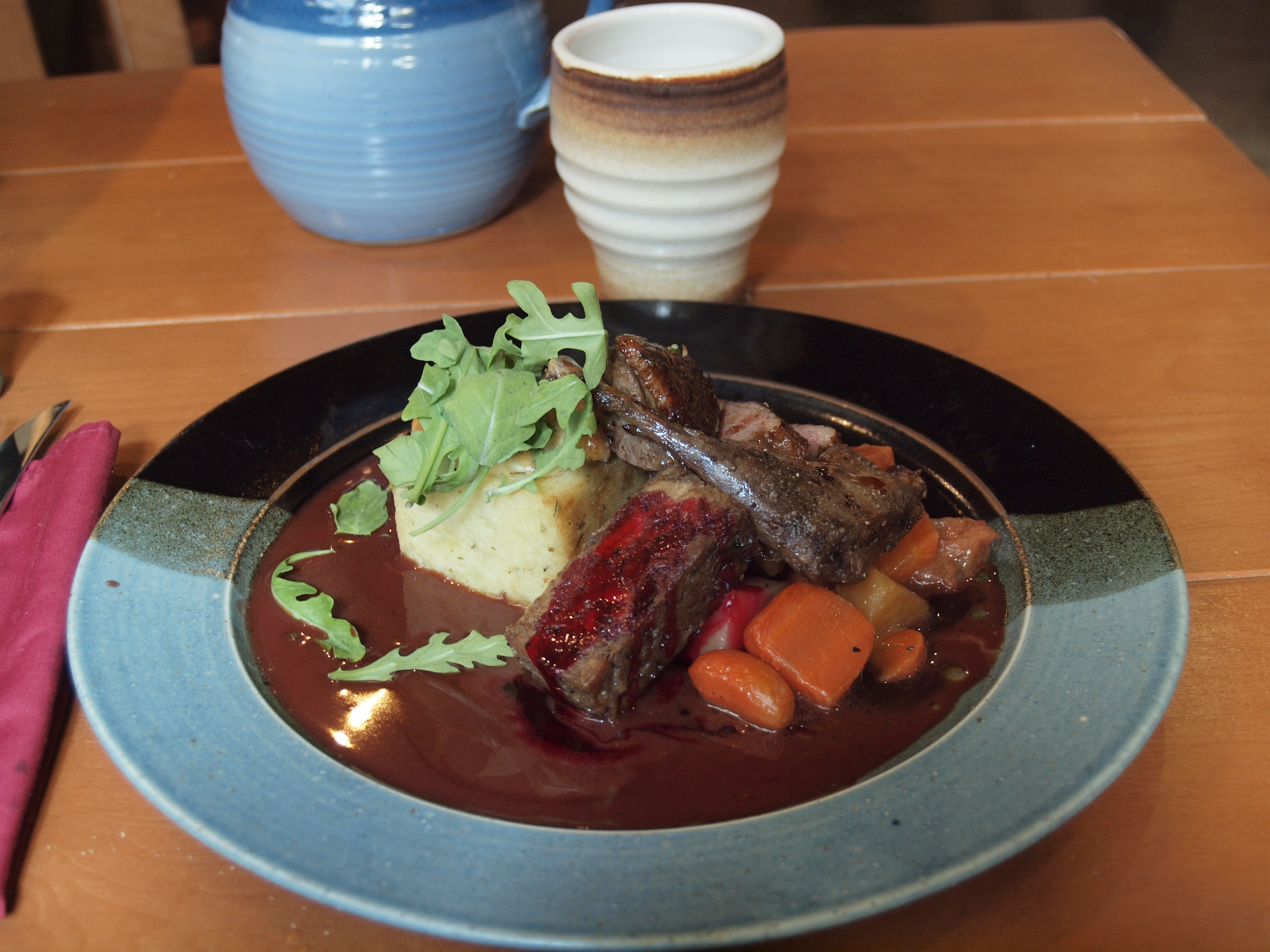
Kolmen nornan sorsa in Helsinki

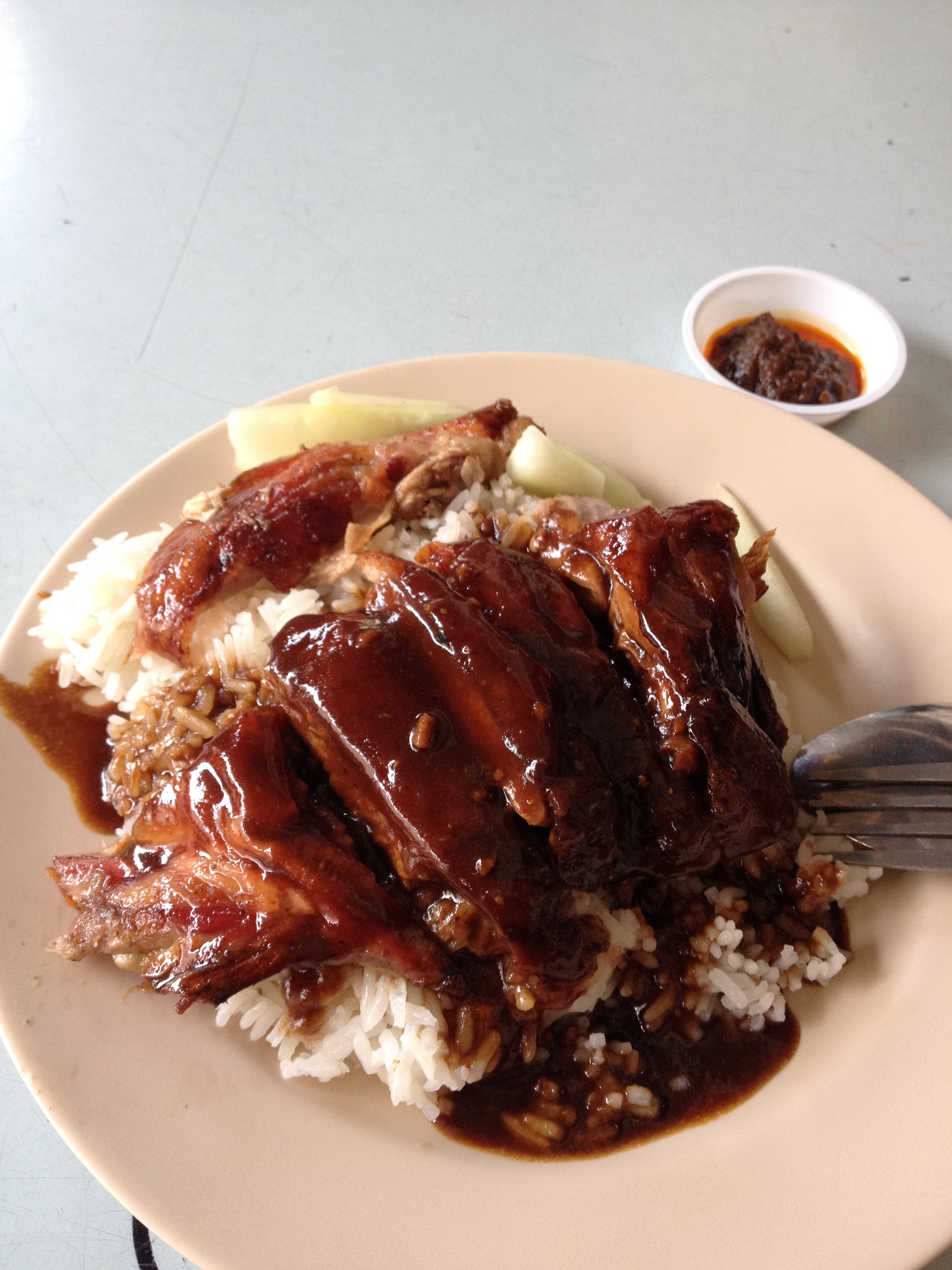
Duck with rice in Singapore

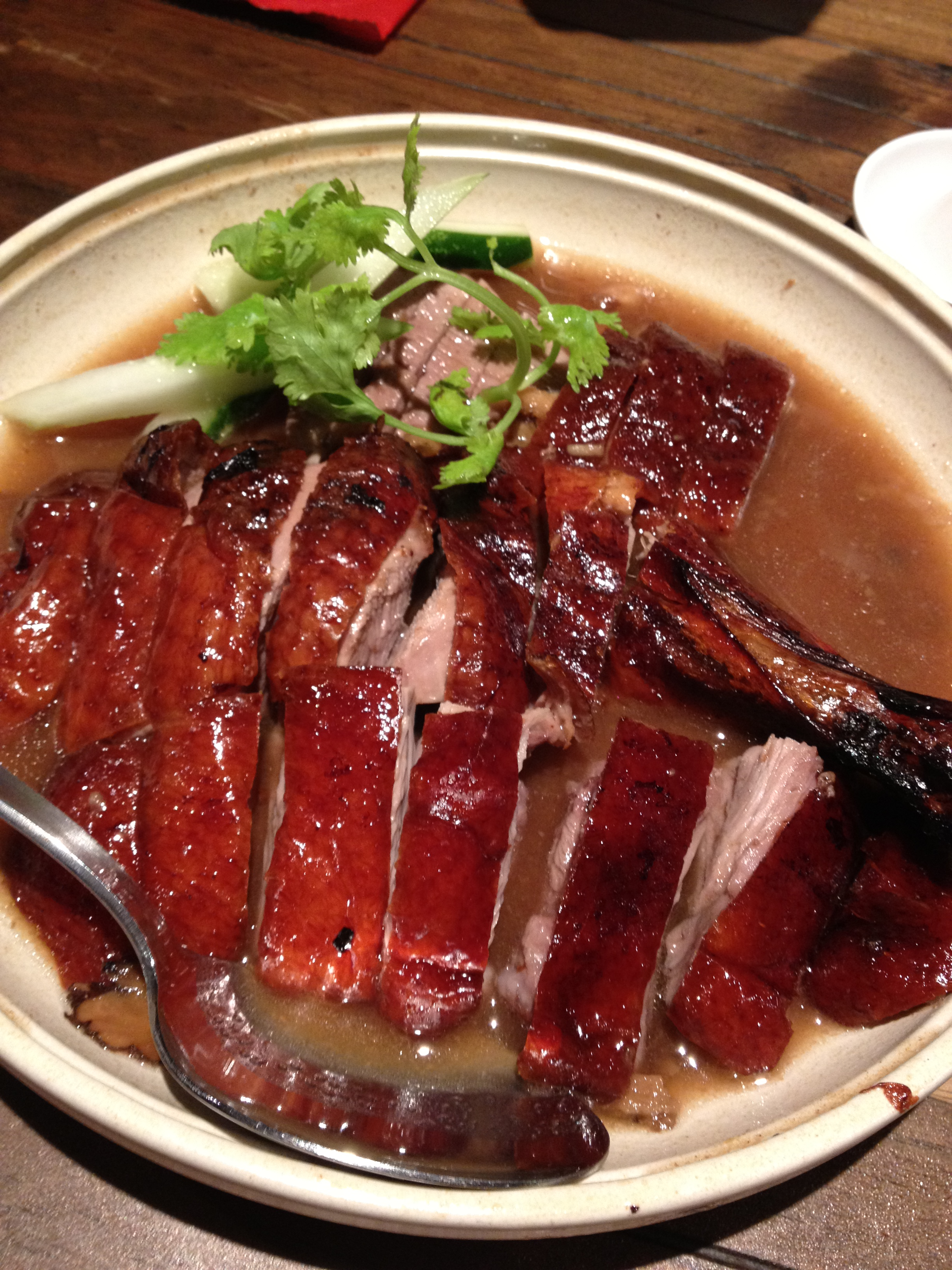
Roast duck with Chinese angelica

== Nutrition and possible health risks ==
Duck meat is very high in cholesterol and fat, particularly saturated fat. It is also very high in protein and iron. An article in The New York Times in 1981 reported that ducks caught in the wild may be contaminated from pollution of rivers and other bodies of water. Other such reports have followed.

== Sources ==
- Algar, Ayla Esen (1999). Classical Turkish Cooking. New York: HarperPerennial. ISBN 0060931639.
- Berlitz staff, unnamed (1982). European Menu Reader. Lausanne: Editions Berlitz. ISBN 978-0-02-964200-9. OCLC 1034663591.
- Bickel, Walter, ed. (1980). Hering's Dictionary of Classical and Modern Cookery (Sixth ed.). London: Virtue. ISBN 3-8057-0232-9.
- Dalrymple, Marya, ed. (1985). Italian Menus. Chicago: Time-Life Books. ISBN 0-86706-252-5.
- David, Elizabeth (1986) [1984]. An Omelette and a Glass of Wine. London: Penguin. ISBN 978-0-14-046721-5.
- Davidson, Alan (1999). The Oxford Companion to Food. Oxford: Oxford University Press. ISBN 978-0-19-211579-9.
- Escoffier, Auguste (1907). Le guide culinaire: aide-mémoire de cuisine pratique (in French). Paris: Émile Colin. OCLC 969508192.
- Fernandez, Doreen (1994). Tikim: Essays on Philippine Food and Culture. Manila: Anvil Publishing. ISBN 9789712703829.
- Glasse, Hannah (1747). The Art of Cookery Made Plain and Easy. London: Glasse. OCLC 561397353.
- Hartley, Dorothy (1999) [1954]. Food in England. London: Macdonald and Jane's. ISBN 978-1-8560-5497-3.
- Kallon, Zainabu Kpaka (2004). Zainabu's African Cookbook. New York: Citadel. ISBN 9780806525495.
- Kime, Tom (2017). Thai Food Made Easy. Sydney: Murdoch Books. ISBN 978-1760522742.
- Ḳornfeld, Lilyan (1962). Israeli Cookery. Westport: Avi Publishing. OCLC 522995.
- Kruger, Vivienne (2014). "10: Bebek Betutu: The Balinese Duck". Balinese Food: The Traditional Cuisine & Food Culture of Bali. Tuttle. ISBN 978-1462914234.
- Mackley, Lesley (1998). The Book of North African Cooking. New York: HP Books. ISBN 1557882959.
- Olaore, Ola (1990). Traditional African Cooking. Slough: Foulsham. ISBN 0572016077.
- Riley, Gillian (2009). The Oxford Companion to Italian Food. Oxford: Oxford University Press. ISBN 978-0-19-538710-0.
- Robinson, Martin (2007). Korea. Footscray and London: Lonely Planet. ISBN 9781741045581.
- Sandler, Bea (1993). The African Cookbook. Secaucus: Carol Publishing. ISBN 0806513985.
- Shaida, Margaret (1992). The Legendary Cuisine of Persia. Henley-on-Thames: Lieuse Publications. ISBN 0951991817.
- Stobart, Tom (1998). The Cook's Encyclopaedia. London: Grub Street. ISBN 1902304004.
- Van der Post, Laurens (1970). African Cooking. New York: Time-Life Books. OCLC 1036832191.
- Van Wyk, Magdaleen (1996). Traditional South African Cooking. Johannesburg: CNA. ISBN 1770074074.
- Ward, Susan (2003). Lebanese Cooking. Dallas: Hackberry Press. ISBN 1931040206.
- Żerańska, Alina (1968). The Art of Polish Cooking. Garden City: Doubleday. OCLC 1147731809.
