= Shock (surname) =

Shock is a surname. Notable people with the surname include:

- Everett Shock, American rock singer and geochemist
- Maurice Shock (1926–2018), British educator
- Molly Shock, American film editor
- Nathan Shock (1906–1989), American gerontologist
- Ron Shock (1942–2012), American comedian and storyteller
- Stefie Shock (born 1969), Canadian musician
- Susy Shock (born 1968), Argentine actress, writer and singer

== See also ==
- Viki Shock, pen name of Viktor Pípal (born 1975), Czech writer and poet
- Shock (disambiguation)
- Schock (surname)
- Shook (surname)
