= Schock =

Schock may refer to:

== People with the surname ==
- Schock (surname)

== Art, entertainment, and media ==
- Schock (album), by the German band Eisbrecher

== Organizations ==
- W. D. Schock Corp, an American sailboat manufacturer

== Money ==
- Schock (coin), historical European coin

== See also ==
- Shock (disambiguation)
