= Shocking =

Shocking may refer to:

== Concepts ==
- Surprise, an emotion
- Shocking (cooking), or putting food into ice water

== Animals ==
- Shocking (horse) (foaled 2005), an Australian horse

== Music ==
- Shocking (Slaughter & the Dogs album), 1991
- Shocking (Tsu Shi Ma Mi Re album), 2012
- "Shocking", a song by Linton Kwesi Johnson from LKJ in Dub (1995)
- "Shocking", a song by Catherine Wheel from Happy Days (album), 1995
