= Shocked =

Shocked may refer to:

- Shocked, to suffer an electric shock
- Michelle Shocked an American singer-songwriter
- Shocked (film), a 1985 film starring Jodie Foster
- "Shocked" (song), a 1990 song by Kylie Minogue
- "Shocked", a 1982 song by Joe Cocker from Sheffield Steel
- "Shocked", a 1988 song by Bros from Push

== See also ==
- Shock (disambiguation)
