= Shocker =

Shocker may refer to:

- Shocker (character), a supervillain in the Marvel Comics universe
- Shocker (wrestler), a Mexican-American professional wrestler
- Shocker (gesture), a hand gesture with a sexual connotation
- The Shocker (band), a musical group led by Jennifer Finch
- Wichita State Shockers, a nickname for Wichita State University athletic teams
- Shocker (film), a 1989 Wes Craven horror film
- Shocker (Kamen Rider), a fictional organization from Kamen Rider
- The Shocker (album), a 1996 hip hop album by American rapper Silkk the Shocker
- Shocker (Dungeons & Dragons), creature in the Dungeons & Dragons series
- "Shocker", a 2014 song by W&W and Headhunterz
- Shock site

== See also ==
- Shock (disambiguation)
