= Shock Treatment (disambiguation) =

Shock Treatment is a 1981 American dark comedy musical film, a follow-up to The Rocky Horror Picture Show.

Shock Treatment may also refer to:

== Film and television ==
- Shock Treatment (1964 film), an American neo noir drama
- Shock Treatment (1969 film), or On the Reeperbahn at Half Past Midnight
- Shock Treatment (1973 film), a French drama
- Shock Treatment (1995 film), a TV film
- Shock Treatment (TV series), a 2005 British reality entertainment documentary

== Music ==
- Shock Treatment (band), a Northern Irish punk band
- Shock Treatment (Don Ellis album), 1968
- Shock Treatment (Edgar Winter album), 1974
- Shock Treatment (Krizz Kaliko album), 2010

== See also ==
- Electroconvulsive therapy
- Shock therapy
