= Wuhan duck =

Chinese dish

Wuhan duck neck, feet, and wing tips

Wuhan duck refers to several dishes from the city of Wuhan, in Hubei Province, China. The dishes are specific parts of a duck, including the tongue, head, feet, liver, kidney, and most popularly, the neck, often referred to as "spicy duck neck". Common to all of these dishes is the colour, a deep reddish-brown, and the extremely spicy flavour. These items are sold in numerous provinces throughout China.

== See also ==
- Hubei cuisine
- List of duck dishes
