= Shocking (cooking) =

Cooking method

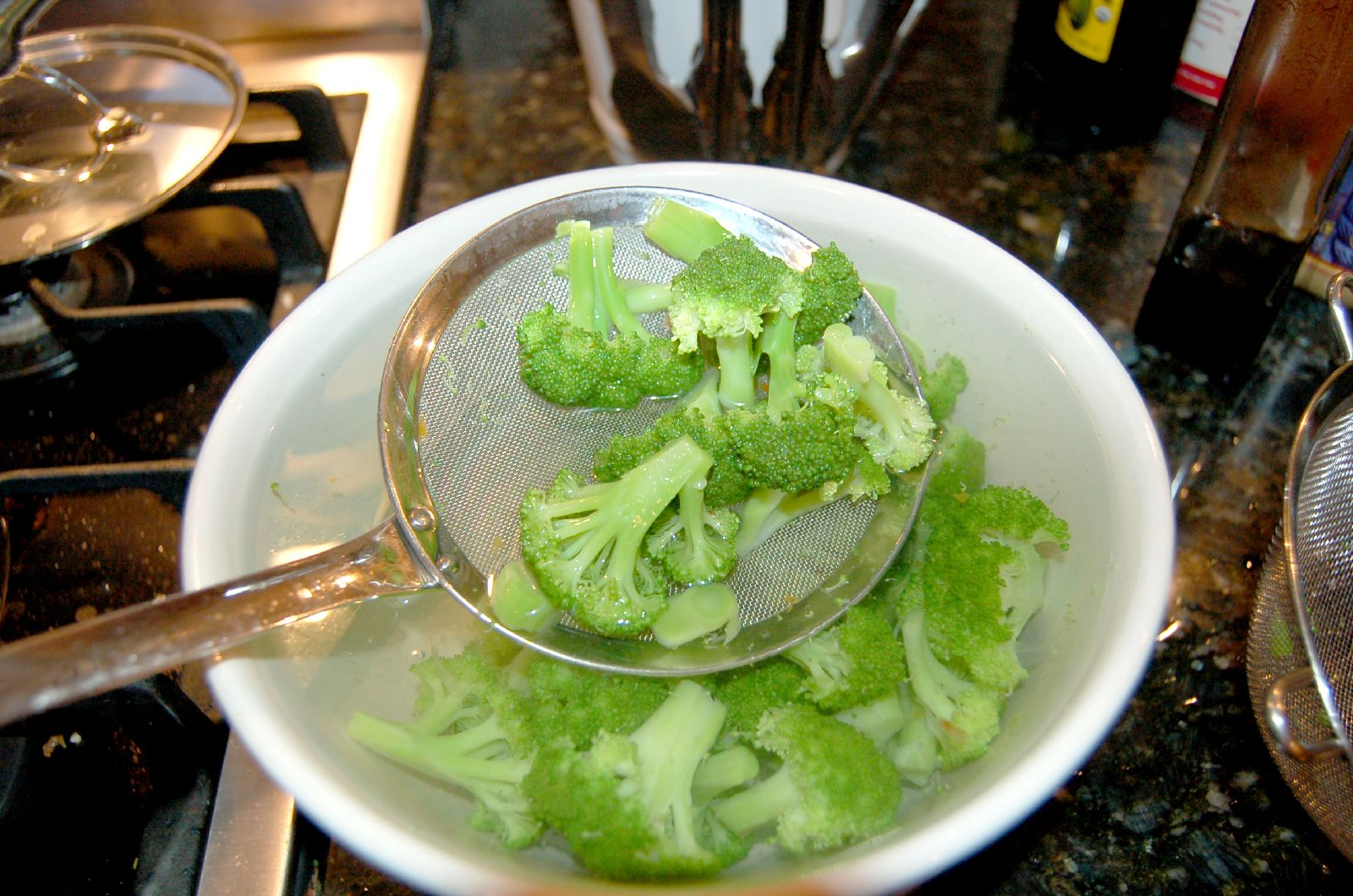
Shocking broccoli in cold water

Shocking is a cooking process wherein the food substance, usually a vegetable or fruit, is plunged into iced water or placed under cold running water to halt the cooking process. This process usually preserves the colour, taste and texture of a fruit or vegetable.

== See also ==
- Blanching
- Parboiling
