= Marcus Boyd Shook =

American physician (1933–2022)

Marcus Boyd Shook, MD, MACP, MBA (1933–2022) was an American physician specializing in internal medicine, and President of the American Society of Internal Medicine (1996-1997). He held various positions in healthcare, ranging from staff physician to medical director, and was recognized as a Master Fellow of the American College of Physicians (ACP).

== Early life and education ==
Marcus Boyd Shook was born on October 9, 1933, in Oklahoma. Before beginning his medical career, Shook served as an electronics technician in the United States Navy from 1951 to 1953. After completing his service, he earned his medical degree from the George Washington University School of Medicine and Health Sciences in Washington, D.C., graduating in 1959.

== Medical training and career ==
Shook completed his internship and residency in internal medicine in Oklahoma and later at Ancker Hospital in St. Paul, Minnesota, where he served as chief resident. He returned to Oklahoma, where he held various roles in healthcare, including as a staff physician and medical director. In 1995, he earned an MBA from Oklahoma City University. He was involved in private practice with OU Medicine in Oklahoma City and founded Fundación Manos Juntas, a free medical clinic in Oklahoma City providing healthcare services to uninsured and underserved communities.

== Awards and recognition ==
In 2000, Shook was awarded the Oscar E. Edwards Memorial Award for Volunteerism and Community Service by the American College of Physicians. In 2004, Shook was recognized the title of Master Fellow of the American College of Physicians. After his death in 2022, he was posthumously honored with the Lifetime Achievement Award by the Oklahoma Universal Human Rights Alliance.

== Death ==
Marcus Boyd Shook died on December 23, 2022. During his final week, he still treated patients at Manos Juntas Free Clinic.
