= Shock therapy =

Shock therapy may refer to:

== Psychiatry ==
- Electroconvulsive therapy, which induces a seizure in the brain to treat disorders
- Graduated electronic decelerator (GED), a device that applies an electric shock to punish undesirable behavior
- Insulin shock therapy, a former schizophrenia treatment
- Convulsive therapy, former use of pentylenetetrazol or other agents to induce seizures

== Economics ==
- Shock therapy (economics)

== See also ==
- Shock Treatment (disambiguation)
- Extracorporeal shockwave therapy
