= Schock (surname) =

Schock is a surname, and may refer to:

- Aaron Schock (born 1981), American politician from Illinois
- Axel Schock (born 1965), German journalist and author
- Barbara Schock-Werner (born 1947), German architect
- Danny Schock (1948–2017), Canadian ice hockey player
- Gerd-Volker Schock (born 1950), German football player and coach
- Gina Schock (born 1957), American drummer
- Harriet Schock (born 1941), American singer-songwriter
- Mitch Schock (born 1971), American professional poker player
- Rudolf Schock (1915–1986), German tenor
- Rolf Schock (1933–1986), Swedish–American philosopher and artist
- Ron Schock (born 1943), Canadian ice hockey player, brother of Danny Schock

== See also ==
- Shock (surname)
