= Shocking (Tsu Shi Ma Mi Re album) =

Studio album by Tsu Shi Ma Mi Re
- Released: 2012
- Genre: Indie rock, art punk

Tsu Shi Ma Mi Re chronology
Giving Blood (2011)	Shocking (2012)

Professional ratings
Review scores
Source	Rating
Boston Bastard Brigade	4.5/5 stars

Shocking is an album by the all-girl Japanese rock band Tsu Shi Ma Mi Re. Their fourth full-length album, it was released in 2012.

== Track listing ==
1. "Hungry and Empty" - 5:38
2. "Darwin" - 3:38
3. "Theme of Sara" - 4:31
4. "Memoirs of Cabbage Wild" - 5:26
5. "Hokka Hoka Day" - 4:06
6. "Fly, Ebi Fried." - 3:26
7. "Shocking" - 2:02
8. "Road of Girl" - 3:55
9. "Hours Carnival" - 4:32
10. "Messiah ~The God of Food~" - 9:40
11. "UFO For You" - 4:05
12. "Space and Big Love" - 7:38
