= Viki Shock =

Czech writer and poet (born 1975)

- Born: Viktor Pípal; 8 April 1975 (age 51); Prague, Czechoslovakia
- Occupations: Writer, artist

Viktor Pípal, better known under the pseudonym Viki Shock (born 8 April 1975), is a Czech writer and poet. He is best known for his avant-garde and experimental writings and his involvement in the Czech underground. His texts draw heavily upon the traditions of pataphysics, Dadaism, Surrealism, and Absurdist fiction.

== Life and work ==
Born and raised in Prague, Shock graduated from a technical school in 1995 and worked successively as a mechanic, sanitary technician, librarian, porter, production assistant at Czech Television, and a proofreader, copywriter, and editor at the media agency Mediafax, while at the same time engaging in numerous artistic and underground pursuits. In addition to having several poetry collections published, he published at his own expense the literary magazine Karpatské příčiny (1994–95), was a member of the music group Ironická mozek (1993–1996 and 2002–2005), operated the samizdat/underground publishing house THC Review from 1997 to 2004, which published some 31 books, in print runs of five to 30 copies, of “cannabis crazypoetry.” In 2008 his drawings and collages were exhibited at the Galerie Smečky in Prague. More recently, he worked for a couple of years as a gardener in the Liboc-Vokovice, Bubeneč and Malvazinky cemeteries in Prague, an experience which formed the basis for his novel Zahradníkův rok na hřbitově, and studied at the Hussite Theological Faculty at Charles University in Prague, from which he earned an M.A. in 2020. In that same year a retrospective collection of his poetry, V předsíni dýchal idiot [In the Vestibule Breathed an Idiot], was published.

Shock also regularly contributes to Czech journals such as Babylon, Dobrá adresa, Přítomnost, Pražský patriot, Psí víno, Reflex and Tvar. His translation of H.P. Lovecraft’s Fungi from Yuggoth was published in 2019.

== Works ==
- Dvacet deka něžností (poetry, 1997)
- Dvakrát opakované ňadro (poetry, 1999; 2nd edition 2003)
- Karel Bodlák – Květy bodláčí (prose and poetry, 2001)
- Pozdrav z Pandemonia (poetry, 2002)
- Negropolis aneb Irracionálno dobyto! (poetry, 2003)
- Poddůstojníky (poetry, 2003)
- Tiché odpoledne na zaprášené půdě (2006)
- Zahradníkův rok na hřbitově (novel, 2014)
- Sněhurka, jakou svět neviděl! (prose and poetry, 2015)
- V předsíni dýchal idiot (selected works and drawings, 2020)
- Půlnoční Rapsódie: Noční můry a jiné živé sny z let 1995–2023 (prose and poetry, 2023)
- Povoláním povaleč (stories, 2025)
