= Blanching (cooking) =

Brief scalding of food in boiling water

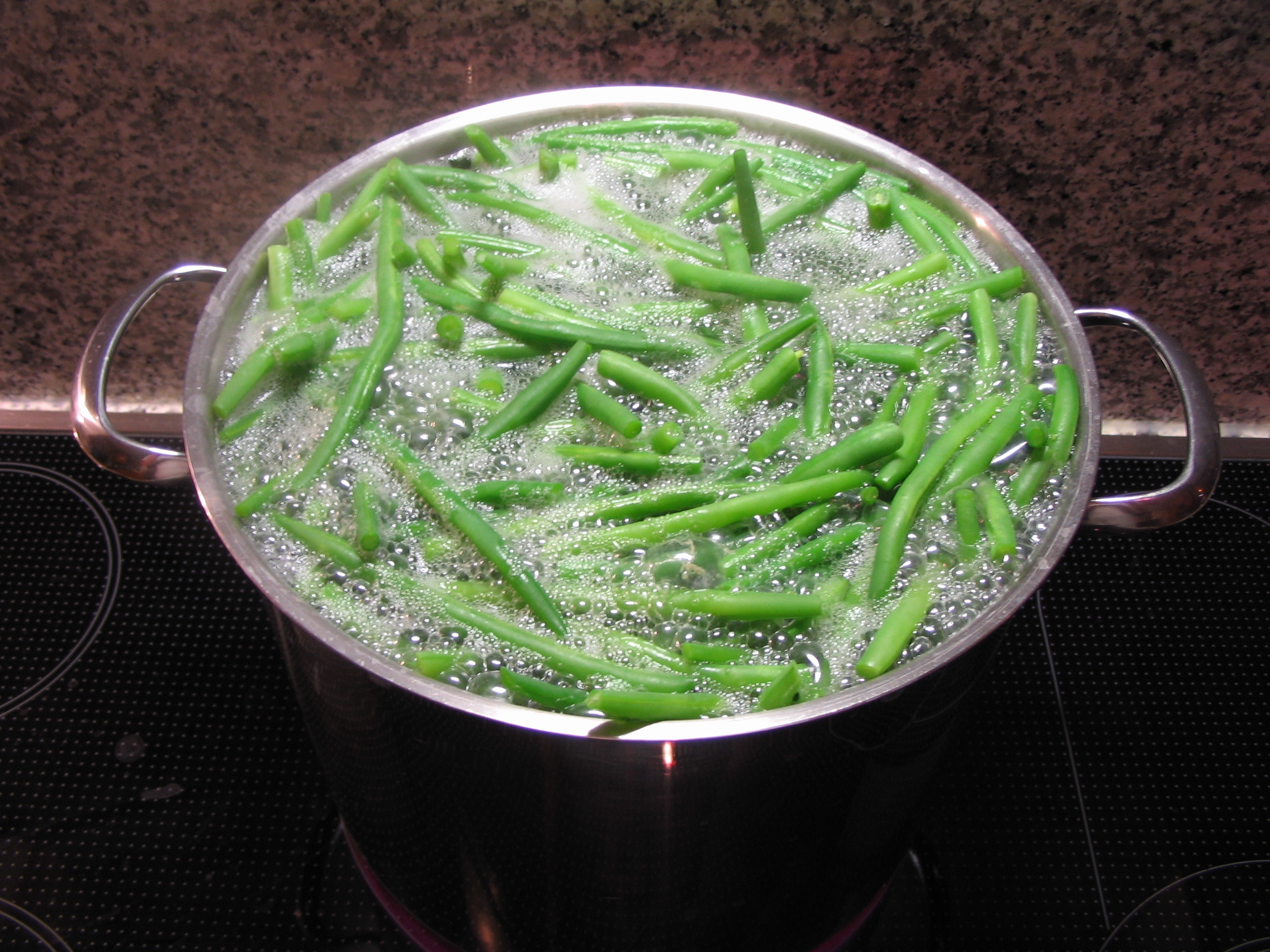
The first step: green beans in boiling water

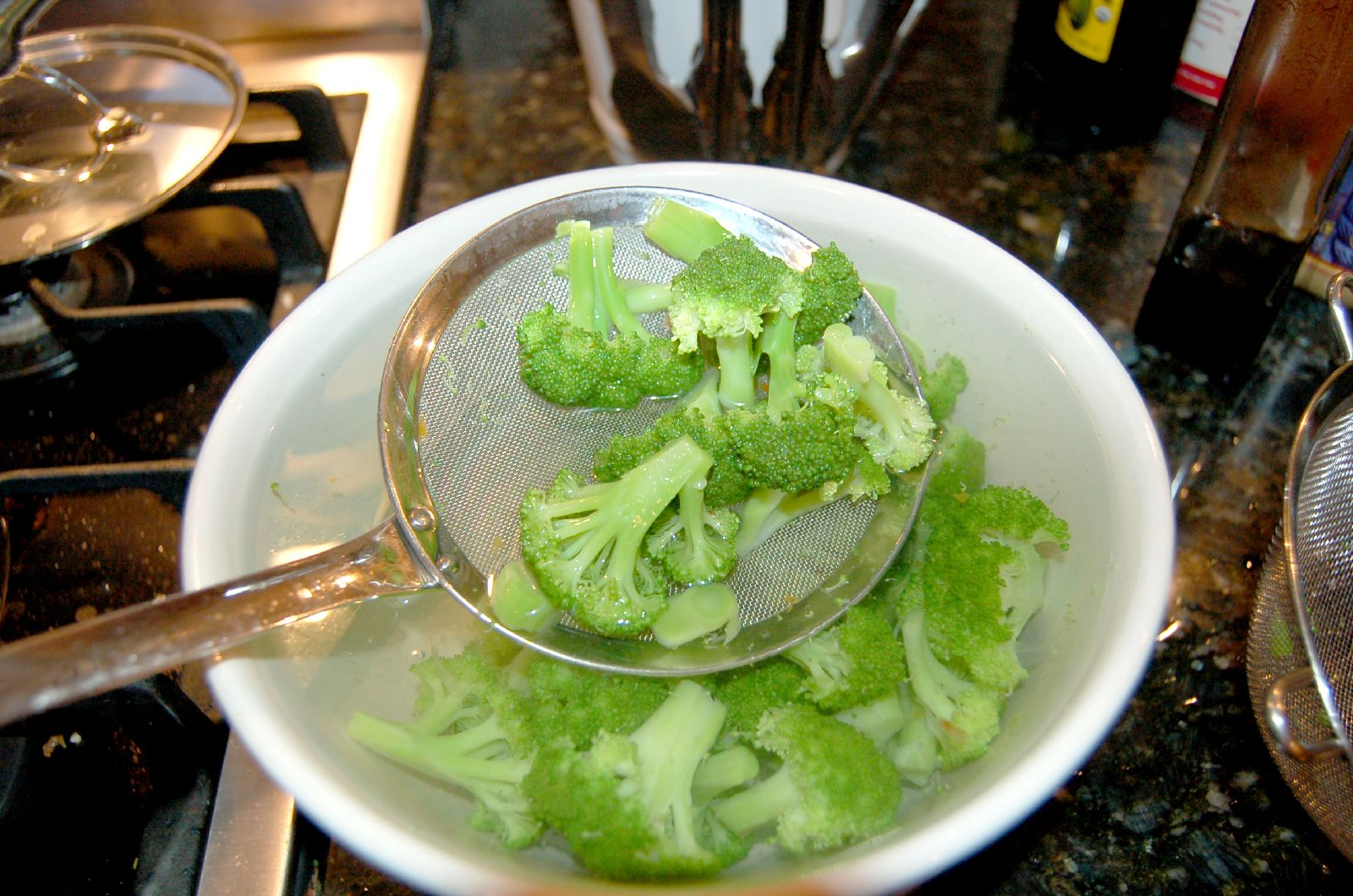
Broccoli being shocked in cold water to complete the blanching

Blanching is a process in which a food, usually a vegetable or fruit, is partially cooked by first scalding in boiling water, then removing after a brief timed interval, and finally plunging into iced water or placing under cold running water (known as shocking or refreshing) to halt the cooking process. Blanching foods helps reduce quality loss over time. Blanching is often used as a treatment prior to freezing, dehydrating, or canning vegetables or fruits to deactivate enzymes, modify texture, remove the peel and wilt tissue. The inactivation of enzymes preserves colour, flavour, and nutritional value. The process has three stages: preheating, blanching, and cooling. The most common blanching methods for vegetables/fruits are hot water and steam, while cooling is either done using cold water or cool air. Other benefits of blanching include removing pesticide residues and decreasing microbial load. Drawbacks to the blanching process can include leaching of water-soluble and heat-sensitive nutrients and the production of effluent.

== Application ==
Blanching is a process used in the home kitchen as well as used as a pre-treatment in the food industry. In both cases, its main purpose is to deactivate enzymes that cause browning as well as textural changes and off-flavors. Enzymes that cause deterioration in fruits and vegetables include lipoxygenase, polyphenoloxidase, polygalacturonase, and chlorophyllase. Catalase and peroxidase are commonly used to determine blanching success, since they are the most thermal-resistant enzymes of concern. These enzymes are responsible for the loss of flavor, color, texture, and nutritional qualities during product storage.

The blanching process expels air trapped inside plant tissues, which is a vital step before canning. Blanching prevents the expansion of air during processing, which reduces strain on the containers and the risk of cans having faulty seams. Moreover, removing gas from foods like pears results in better texture and reduces oxidation of the product. Also, the intercellular gases removed results in better color retention.

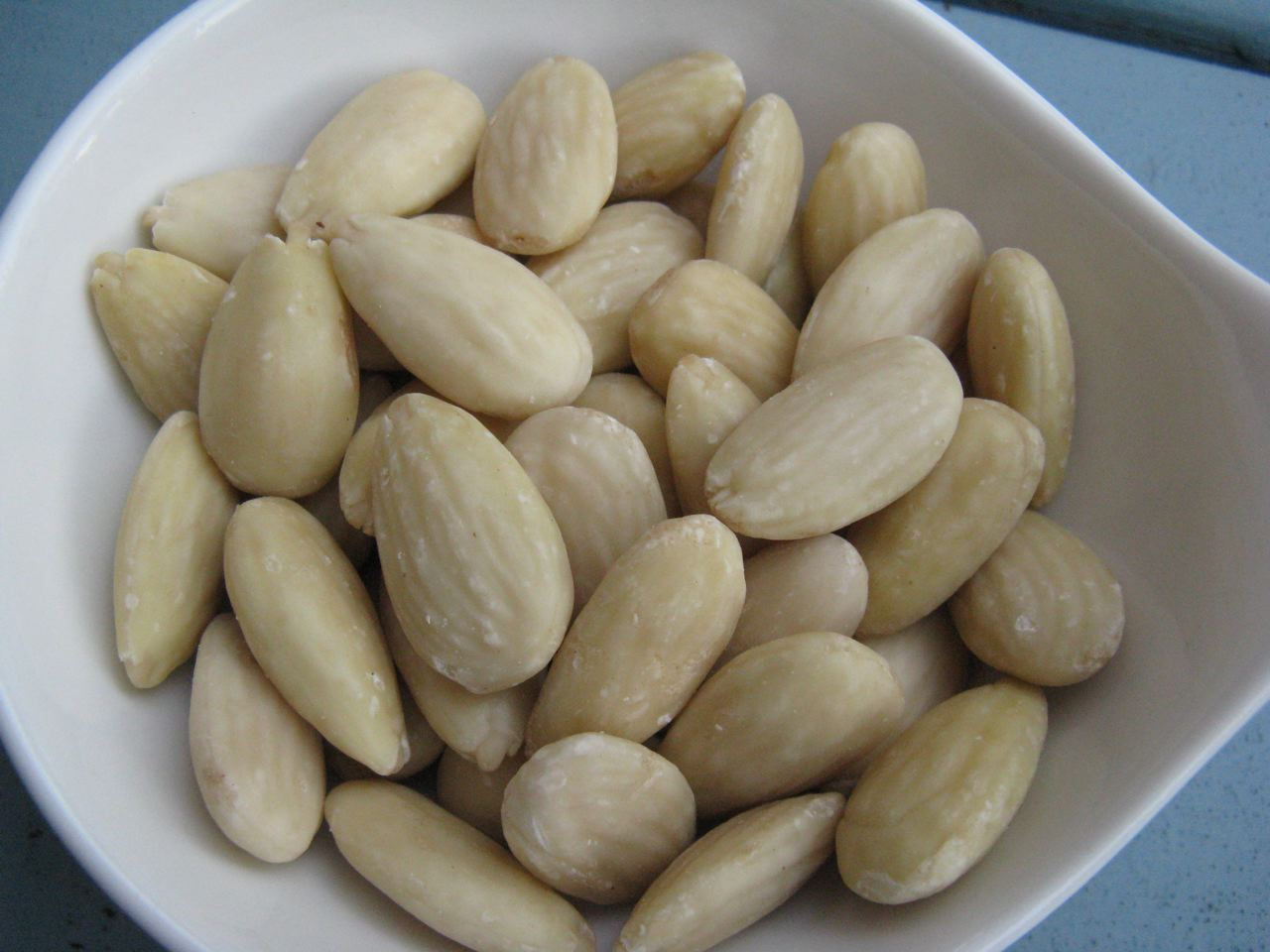
Blanched almonds

Fruit, vegetable, and nut peeling is also important in food processing. When almonds or pistachios are blanched, the skin of the nut (botanically the seed coat surrounding the embryo) softens and can be easily removed later. Steam peeling produces less environmental pollution and peeling losses, as compared to chemical or manual peeling processes.

Other uses of blanching are enhancing drying rate and product quality, decreasing microbial load, removing pesticide and toxic residues, increasing extraction of bioactive compounds, surface cleaning, removing damaged seeds or foreign materials, killing parasites and their eggs, and reducing oil uptake.

== Technology ==
Traditionally, blanching is done using either a water bath or saturated steam. In both methods, the food is heated for a short period of time and then introduced into either cold water or cold air to quickly stop the heating process. At the industrial level, foods move on a continuous conveyor belt through preheating, holding, and cooling.

For hot water blanching, vegetables are immersed under pre-warmed water (70 to 100 °C) for varying amounts of time, depending on type and quantity. When the product is heated by water, greater uniformity of heating is achieved, especially when compared to hot air. This advantage allows hot water blanching at lower temperatures, but requires longer blanching times. Water is heated and cooled using heat exchangers and recirculated for continuous use, reducing costs.

Steam blanching systems inject hot saturated steam (~100 °C) onto food as it passes through the blanching system on a conveyor belt. This method greatly reduces the leaching of water-soluble compounds from the product and is the preferred technique for smaller foods and those with cut surfaces. Steam blanching is more energy-efficient, and the ability for quick heating allows for shorter processing times. This reduced heat exposure preserves color, flavor, and overall quality of the food; however, evaporation may occur leading to lower masses and product yields.

Directly following the heat treatment, vegetables/fruits are quickly chilled by cold water. A common alternative to cooling with cold water is cooling with cold air. This method of cooling prevents the leaching of water-soluble nutrients; however, the air causes evaporation and lowers the mass of the vegetable—a monetary disadvantage for industry.

Emerging technologies include ohmic, infrared, microwave, and radio frequency blanching.

== Time and temperature ==
It is important to consider the recommended times and temperatures for a food product when blanching. Times and temperatures are based on the type of food, size, shape, and other factors. Over-blanching can lead to an excessive loss of nutrients and aromatic compounds, as well as softening of the food. Blanching at temperatures or times lower than those recommended may not effectively inactivate all enzymes. In addition, this may also cause the release of more enzymes from the plant tissue, causing greater overall enzymatic activity and faster spoiling of the product.

== Disadvantages ==
Although blanching is a thermal process, the times and temperatures are not sufficient to effectively destroy all microorganisms. Blanching is often seen as a pre-process to later preservation steps. For example, blanching in the home is often done in combination with freezing; blanching in industry is also used before canning, dehydration, or heat sterilization.

A limitation to hot water blanching is the leaching of water-soluble nutrients and the degradation of thermal sensitive compounds. Vitamins, minerals, and other water-soluble compounds, such as proteins, sugars, and flavor compounds, diffuse out of the food and into the water, lowering the overall quality of the food. The degree to which compounds diffuse out of food depends on the food's composition and characteristics, the water to food ratio, the blanching temperature, and other variables. Ascorbic acid, thiamin, and many aromatic compounds are heat-sensitive.

A complication in the food industry is the production of effluent from water blanching systems. Blanching with reused water can lead to a buildup of water-soluble compounds that are considered pollutants, and therefore must be properly treated before being discharged. This can increase capital costs at the industrial level and has been a main reason for the development of newer blanching technologies.
