= Juewei Duck Neck =

Chinese fast food chain

Juewei Food simplified Chinese: 绝味食品; traditional Chinese: 絕味食品; pinyin: Juéwèi Shípǐn
- A branch of Juewei in Changsha Hunan
- Formerly: simplified Chinese: 绝味鸭脖; traditional Chinese: 絕味鴨脖; pinyin: Juéwèi Yābó
- Type: Listed Company
- Traded as: SSE: 603517
- Industry: Food Service
- Founded: 2006; 20 years ago
- Headquarters: Changsha, Hunan
- Key people: Dai Wenjun (Chairman)
- Products: Prepared duck products
- Website: www.juewei.cn

Juewei Food, operating as Juewei Duck Neck (simplified Chinese: 绝味鸭脖; traditional Chinese: 絕味鴨脖; pinyin: Juéwèi Yābó) in China and King of Braise in Singapore, is a retail snack chain with annual retail sales of RMB5.8 billion in 2015. Its headquarters are in Changsha, Hunan. As of 2021, the company has over 10,000 stores.

Duck neck is its specialty food. Its products consist of mainly braised duck parts or vegetables with specialty flavours such as mala, sweet and spicy, dark soy sauce and five spice.

== History ==
Display case with products for sale

It was established in 2006; previously the company name was Changsha Jueweixuan Business Management Corporation and it was headquartered in Changsha. In 2011 a consortium invested 260 million renminbi (US$40 million) in Juewei Duck Neck. This consortium included Fosun Group and Kunwu Jiuding Capital Co., Ltd.

As of the end of 2025, Juewei had 10,713 outlets, making it the largest of the three major Chinese braised food chains. This was a decrease from down from 14,969 stores in 2024. Its first annual loss, posted in 2025, has been attributed to high expansion costs.
